= Bob Boden =

American game show producer

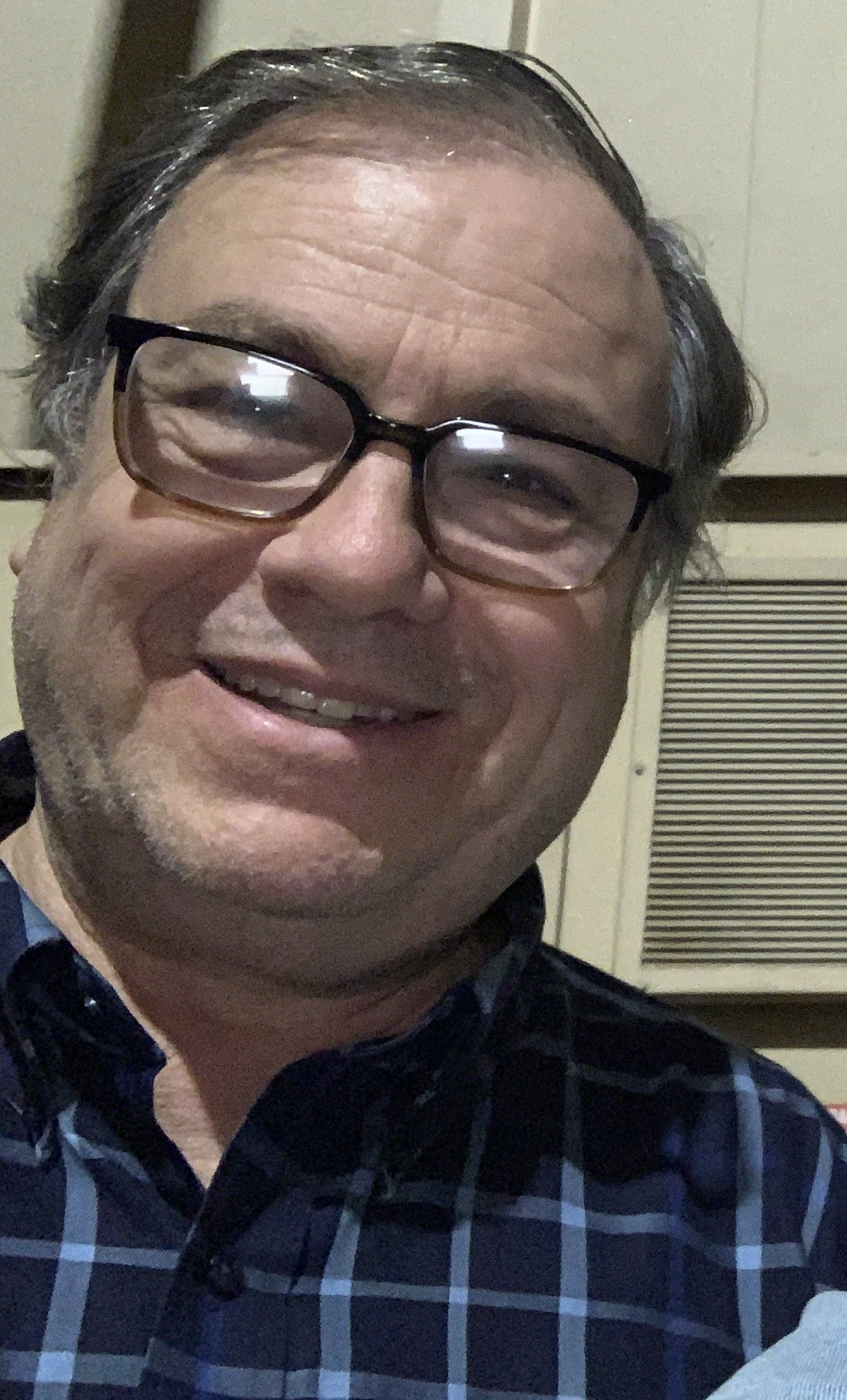
- Boden in 2024.
- Born: January 21, 1959 (age 67); New York, New York
- Other name: TV Bob
- Education: University of California, Los Angeles; California State University, Dominguez Hills
- Spouse: Marla Boden
- Children: 1
- Website: tvbob.com

Bob Boden (born January 21, 1959) is an American television producer. He is known for his work on game shows and reality television and is the executive vice president of production and development for Byron Allen's company Entertainment Studios.

Shows he has developed, supervised and produced include Funny You Should Ask, Family Feud, The $25,000 Pyramid, Press Your Luck, Card Sharks, Home & Family, Family Game Night, The Game of Life, Scrabble Showdown, To Tell the Truth, Don't Forget the Lyrics, Match Game, Solitary, Penn & Teller's Sin City Spectacular, American Idol Extra, Househusbands of Hollywood, The Academy, Paradise Hotel 2, The FOX Reality Channel Really Awards, Lingo, Friend or Foe?, Whammy! The All-New Press Your Luck, Russian Roulette, Cram, Greed (which he co-created), and The Chase, which received a Daytime Emmy nomination.

For Byron Allen's Entertainment Studios, Boden has served as an executive producer of the syndicated game show Funny You Should Ask. In April 2026, CBS announced that Funny You Should Ask would be one of several Allen-produced series replacing The Late Show with Stephen Colbert in the network's late-night lineup.

== Early life and education ==
Boden was born on January 21, 1959, in The Bronx, New York, the only child of Hannah and Kenneth Boden, who were both registered nurses. He grew up in Flushing, Queens, where he graduated from John Bowne High School and moved to Los Angeles, where he graduated from the University of California, Los Angeles in 1981 with a B.A. in Theater Arts. He also has a master's degree from California State University, Dominguez Hills in Negotiation, Conflict Resolution and Peacebuilding.

== Career ==
Boden began his television work as a cue card associate for Barney McNulty, then as a production assistant on the game show Temptation. He then worked at Paramount Television in research. He joined CBS and was selected for the management training program, which resulted in a job as Program Executive in Daytime Programming. Here, he oversaw shows such as Press Your Luck, The $25,000 Pyramid, and Card Sharks. He left CBS to work as Director of Development for Barry & Enright Productions before moving to ABC as Director of Daytime Development. He later worked at Buena Vista Productions and as the vice president of development at Mark Goodson Productions. In 1994, he helped launch the Game Show Network and served as its programming chief between 2001 and 2003. In the late 1990s, he worked as Vice President of Daytime Programming for The Family Channel, where he supervised shows including Shop 'til You Drop, Home & Family, Shopping Spree, and It Takes Two. As Vice President of Development at FX, he oversaw Penn & Teller's Sin City Spectacular and Personal fX: The Collectibles Show. He has also held the titles of Senior Vice President of Product and Development for Dick Clark Productions, as Senior Vice President of Programming for the Fox Reality Channel, and as Senior Vice President of Reality and Game Shows for Hasbro Studios.

In 1999, Boden co-created Greed for FOX with Dick Clark. He then served as its showrunner, executive producer, and writer. The show aired on FOX and was hosted by Chuck Woolery. He was also showrunner and executive producer for The Chase, an adaption of the British game show, on the Game Show Network. The Chase was nominated at the 41st Daytime Emmy Awards for the Daytime Emmy Award for Outstanding Game Show. James Holzhauer appeared on the show in 2014 and the show regained attention after Holzhauer's appearance on Jeopardy!. Boden was featured as a game show expert in several interviews.

In addition to his production work, he is an adjunct professor at Syracuse University's S.I. Newhouse School of Public Communications. In 2022, he gave a TEDx talk at Syracuse.

== Personal life ==
Boden serves as a governor for the Academy of Television Arts & Sciences' reality peer group. He and his wife Marla have a daughter, Rachel.

== Selected credits ==
Year(s)	Title	Role	Episodes	Ref
1984–1985	Jeopardy!	Writer	195	
1986	Press Your Luck	Executive Producer	166	
1990	Home	Executive Producer	10	
1990	Match Game	Executive Producer	22	
1996–1997	Small Talk	Executive Producer	65	
1999	Penn & Teller's Sin City Spectacular	Executive Producer	16	
1999–2000	Greed	Co-Creator/Executive Producer	44	
2000	Double Dare 2000	Consultant	67	
2002	Whammy! The All-New Press Your Luck	Executive Producer	12	
2002–2004	Lingo	Executive Producer/Writer	74	
2003	Cram	Executive Producer	39	
2003	Chuck Woolery: Naturally Stoned	Writer	6	
2005–2007	Reality Remix	Executive Producer	9	
2006–2010	Solitary	Executive Producer	34	
2007	Rob and Amber: Against the Odds	Executive Producer	10	
2007	Are You Smarter than a 5th Grader?	Writer	13	
2007–2008	Don't Forget the Lyrics!	Producer	43	
2007–2009	The Academy	Executive Producer	31	
2008	Paradise Hotel	Executive Producer	16	
2008	Reality Binge	Executive Producer	24	
2008–2009	Battle of the Bods	Executive Producer	36	
2010–2012	Family Game Night	Executive Producer	44	
2011	Scrabble Showdown	Executive Producer	30	
2012–2013	Match Game	Writer	60	
2013–2015	The Chase	Executive Producer	37	
2016	The Ellen DeGeneres Show	Writer	48	
2017	Heads Up!	Executive Producer	50	
2017–2018	Massive Monster Mayhem	Writer	21	
2017–2019	Funny You Should Ask	Executive Producer	206	
