= Dee Bradley Baker filmography =

Performances by American voice actor

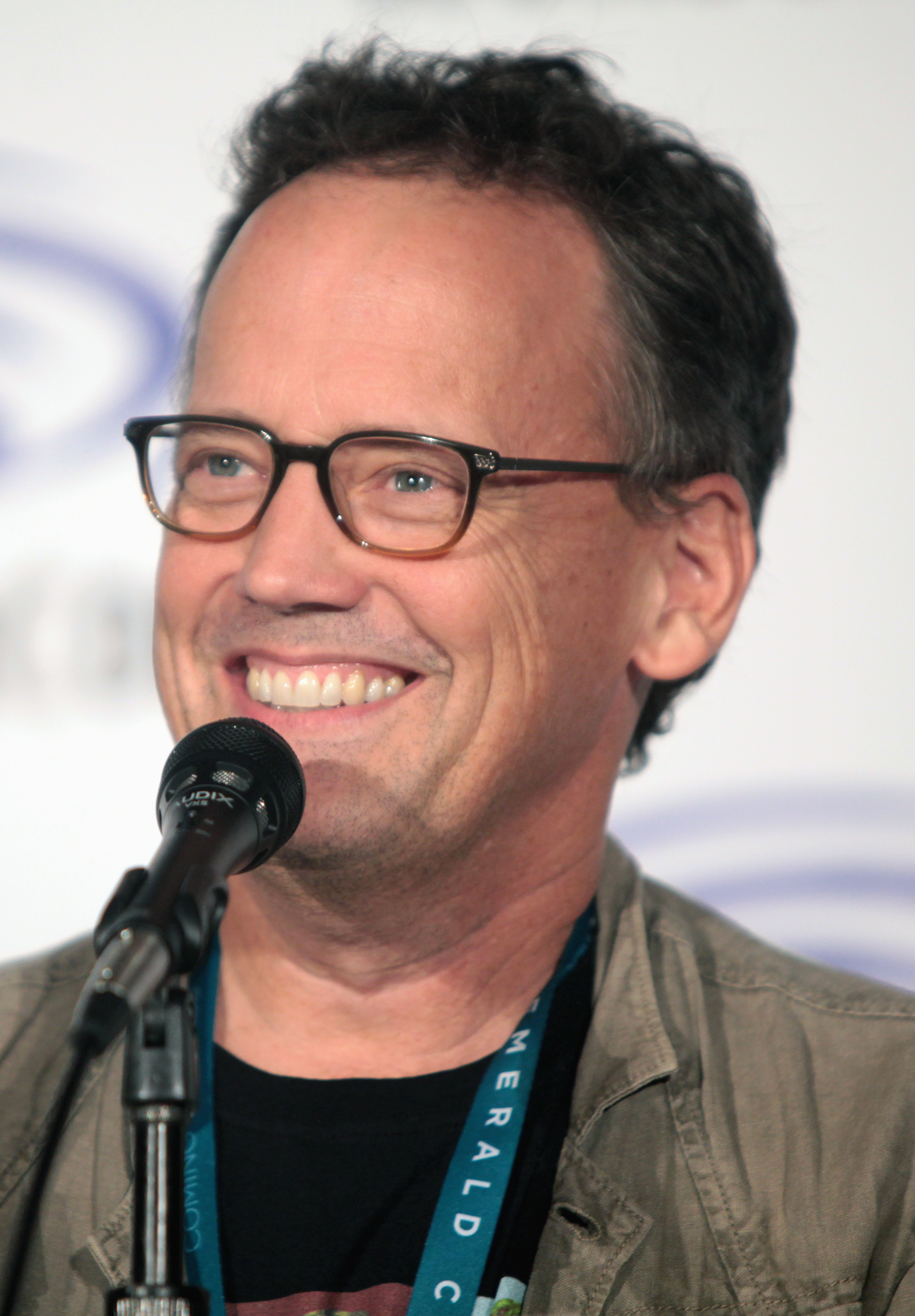
Baker at WonderCon 2016

This is the filmography of American voice actor Dee Bradley Baker.

== As voice actor ==
=== Animated series ===
List of voice performances in animated series
Year	Title	Role	Notes	Source
1995	Timon & Pumbaa	Paperboy/Fronk	Episode: "How to Beat the High Costa Rica"/"Swiss Missed"; Grouped under "With the Voice Talents of"	
1995–2001	What a Cartoon!	Various voices		
1997	The Real Adventures of Jonny Quest	Dr. Vedder, Williams	2 episodes	
1997	Extreme Ghostbusters	Various characters	2 episodes	
1997	Spider-Man	Young Keene Marlow / Destroyer	Episode: "Six Forgotten Warriors Chapter 3: Secrets of the Six"	
1997–99	Cow and Chicken	Dad, others	Main role	
1997–99	I Am Weasel	Jolly Roger, Cow & Chicken's Dad, others	Recurring role	
1997–99	The Angry Beavers	Announcer, Gary the Mongoose, Squirrel, Weatherman	2 episodes	
1997–2004	Johnny Bravo	Various characters		
1997–2003	Dexter's Laboratory	Various characters		
1997–98	Jungle Cubs	Bagheera	Main role; season 2	
1998–2000	The Wild Thornberrys	Various animal characters	Recurring role	
1998–2002	Oh Yeah! Cartoons	Various voices		
1999–2005	The Powerpuff Girls	Various characters	Recurring role	
1999–2001	Mike, Lu & Og	Og, Goat		
1999–present	SpongeBob SquarePants	Squilliam Fancyson, Bubble Bass, Nat Peterson, Harold, others	Recurring role	
2000–03	As Told by Ginger	Mr. Licorice, Mr. Higsby, Emcee		
2000–03	Harvey Birdman, Attorney at Law	Jonny Quest, others	Recurring role	
2001–17	The Fairly OddParents	Elmer, Sanjay, Binky, Remy, Bronze Kneecap, Brass Knuckles, others	Recurring role; Also The Jimmy Timmy Power Hour	
2001	The Zeta Project	Dante	Episode: "Kid Genius"	
2001	What's with Andy?	Dad, Martin	Main role	
2001	Jason and the Heroes of Mount Olympus	Various characters	Grouped under "Featuring the Voices of"	
2001–02	Grim & Evil	Mandy's father, others	Recurring role	
2002–05	Totally Spies!	Various characters	Grouped under "With the Voice Talents of"	
2002–05	What's New, Scooby-Doo?	Recurring role		
2002–04, 2017	Samurai Jack	Various characters		
2002	Jackie Chan Adventures	Kiang Chi, Lam's Assistant	Episode: "The Chi of the Vampire"; Grouped under Also Starring	
2002	Justice League	Synthoid	Episode: "Metamorphosis"	
2002	Invader Zim	Cutest Little Kid, Guy in Crowd, Santa Gerg	Episode: "The Most Horrible X-Mas Ever"	
2002–03	Whatever Happened to Robot Jones?	Mr. Workout, others	Recurring role; Credited as Mr. Rucoat	
2002–03	Poochini's Yard	Billy White, Knucklehead, Bunk, others		
2002–08	Codename: Kids Next Door	Wallabee Beatles / Numbuh 4, Toiletnator, Tommy, Delightful Children from Down the Lane, others	Main role	
2003	Static Shock	Monster	Episode: "The Usual Suspect"	
2003	Stuart Little	Various characters		
2003	Free for All	Angus		
2003	Ozzy & Drix	Father Glop	Episode: "A Growing Cell"	
2003–04	Stripperella	Ozzy, Baby, Businessman		
2003–06	Teen Titans	Cinderblock, Plasmus, Silkie, Gnarrk, André LeBlanc, Wildebeest, Tramm, Larry, additional voices	Recurring role	
2003–06	Dora the Explorer	Animal Sound Effects	Recurring role	
2003–07	The Grim Adventures of Billy & Mandy	Mandy's father, others	Recurring role	
2003–09	My Life as a Teenage Robot	Various characters	Recurring role	
2003–05	Duck Dodgers	Alien Hunter, Phantom Shadow, others	Recurring role	
2003–05	Lilo & Stitch: The Series	David Kawena, Merwin, others	Grouped under "With the Voice Talents of"	
2004–07	Danny Phantom	Prince Aragon, Mikey, Agent K, Thrash, Wulf	Recurring role	
2004–05	Justice League Unlimited	Blockbuster, Woof, young Etrigan	2 episodes	
2004–05	¡Mucha Lucha!	Various characters	Recurring role; Season 3	
2004–05	Megas XLR	Various characters		
2004–08	ChalkZone	Various characters		
2004–08	Higglytown Heroes	Uncle Zooter, Pizza Guy, Egg Farmer Hero		
2004–06	Super Robot Monkey Team Hyperforce Go!	Dr. Jakus Maezono, various characters	Recurring role	
2004–06	W.I.T.C.H.	Martin Tubbs, Cedric, Frost the Hunter, Gargoyle, Khor the Destroyer	Recurring role	
2005–08	Avatar: The Last Airbender	Appa, Momo, various voices	Main role	
2005–08	Ben 10	Stinkfly, Wildmutt, Carl Tennyson, Acid Breath, Eye Guy, Spitter, Porcupine, additional voices	Main role	
2005–07	American Dragon: Jake Long	Various characters	Recurring role	
2005–07	The Life and Times of Juniper Lee	Various characters	Recurring role	
2005–present	American Dad!	Klaus Heisler, Rogu, others	Main role; Nominated – Outstanding Character Voice-Over Performance, episode "Fight and Flight", 69th Primetime Emmy Awards, 2017	
2005	All Grown Up!	Episode: "Dude, Where's My Horse?"		
2005, 2007	Loonatics Unleashed	Otto the Odd, Male Reporter (2)	2 episodes	
2006	The Boondocks		Grouped under "Also starring", episode "Wingmen"	
2006–16	Mickey Mouse Clubhouse	Voice Talent	Recurring role	
2006–13	Handy Manny	Turner		
2006–22	Curious George	Gnocchi, Prof. Pizza, Juicy Jay, others		
2007–10	My Friends Tigger & Pooh	Buster, Woodpecker		
2007	The Emperor's New School	Voice Talent	Episode: "Cool Summer/Prisoner of Kuzcoban"	
2007–15, 2025–present	Phineas and Ferb	Perry the Platypus, additional voices	Main role; Perry was nominated Kids' Choice Award for Best Animal Sidekick, 2014	
2007–09	Back at the Barnyard	Bigfoot, Ryan Earcrust, Announcer, others	Recurring role	
2008	Foster's Home for Imaginary Friends	Reporter, Chichi, Squirrel	Episode: "Mondo Coco"	
2008–09	The Spectacular Spider-Man	Curt Connors / Lizard, Homuncull	Recurring role	
2008–09	Spaceballs: The Animated Series	Dark Helmet	Main role	
2008–09	Random! Cartoons	Various characters	Recurring role	
2008–10	Ben 10: Alien Force	Various Omnitrix aliens, SevenSeven	Main role	
2008–11	The Mighty B!	Happy, others	Main role	
2008–11	Batman: The Brave and the Bold	Clock King, Jason Blood / Etrigan, Brain, Felix Faust, Oberon, Dove, Brother Eye, Fisherman, Professor Milo, Animal-Vegetable-Mineral Man, Haunted Tank, John Wilkes Booth, Chemo, Ace the Bat-Hound, various voices	Recurring role	
2008–14, 2020	Star Wars: The Clone Wars	Clone Troopers, Senator Onaconda Farr, others	Nominated–Annie Award for Voice Acting in a Television Production, 39th Annie Awards	
2009	The Marvelous Misadventures of Flapjack	Cat, Fish Head Monsters, Monkey	2 episodes	
2009	The Secret Saturdays	Georgia Pigman, Honey Island Swamp Monster, Bunyip, Xing Xing	2 episodes	
2009–12	The Penguins of Madagascar	Wild Marlene, Jiggles, others	Recurring role	
2009–12	Jungle Junction	Lance		
2009–14	Fanboy & Chum Chum	Mecha-Tech, Scampers, Precious, others	Recurring role	
2010–13	Scooby-Doo! Mystery Incorporated	Various characters	Recurring role	
2010–18	Adventure Time	Cinnamon Bun, Mr. Cupcake, Chet, others	Recurring role	
2010–12	Ben 10: Ultimate Alien	Heatblast, Wildmutt, Diamondhead, Four Arms, Stinkfly, Cannonbolt, Way Big, Swampfire, Echo Echo, Humungosaur, Jetray, Big Chill, Chromastone, Brainstorm, Spidermonkey, Goop, Nanomech, Water Hazard, Armodrillo, Terraspin, NRG, Fasttrack, Chamalien, Eatle, Clockwork, Juryrigg, various characters	Main role	
2010–12	Generator Rex	Various voices	Recurring role	
2010–11	The Super Hero Squad Show	Annihilus, Devil Dinosaur	2 episodes	
2010–11	Take Two with Phineas and Ferb	Perry the Platypus	Episode: "Seth Rogen"	
2011–16	Jake and the Never Land Pirates	Crocodile	Recurring role	
2011	Hero Factory	Firelord, Fangz, Scorpio	2 episodes	
2011	The Looney Tunes Show	Colonel Frankenheimer	Episode: "Eligible Bachelors"	
2011	Green Lantern: The Animated Series	Larfleeze	Episode: "Larfleeze"	
2011–present	Family Guy	Klaus Heissler, Admiral Ackbar, additional voices	Recurring role	
2011–14	Winx Club	Kiko, Wizgiz, various voices	Recurring role	
2011–12	ThunderCats	Slythe, Kaynar, Ro-Bear-Bill, others	Recurring role	
2011–21	Young Justice	Wolf, Monsieur Mallah, Ultra-Humanite, DeSaad, Felix Faust, Chameleon Boy, Kalibak, Jimmy Olsen, Serifan, Jeremiah, K'arr M'angg, Grayven, Tawky Tawny, Devourer, Teekl	Recurring role	
2012–20	Doc McStuffins	Robot Ray, Sebastian, Squibbles, others		
2012	The Avengers: Earth's Mightiest Heroes	Mister Fantastic / Reed Richards		
2012–14	The Legend of Korra	Pabu, Naga, Tarrlok, additional voices	Recurring role; Nominated–BTVA Voice Acting Award for Best Male Vocal Performance in a Television Series in a Supporting Role-Action/Drama, 2012	
2012–14	Ben 10: Omniverse	Various Omnitrix aliens, Psyphon, Sheriff Wat-Senn, Caitiff, Acid Breath, Inspector 13, Kraab, Slix Vigma, additional voices		
2012–13	Kaijudo	Master Jaha, Artie Underhill, Gargle, Brutelus, Razorhide, others	Recurring role; Nominated–BTVA Voice Acting Award for Best Male Vocal Performance in a Television Series in a Supporting Role – Action/Drama, 2013, Master Jaha	
2012–13	Fish Hooks	Various voices	3 episodes	
2012–15	Randy Cunningham: 9th Grade Ninja	Julian, Sorcerer's Rat	Recurring role	
2012–16	Gravity Falls	Waddles	Waddles was nominated Kids' Choice Award for Best Animal Sidekick, 2014	
2012–17	Ultimate Spider-Man	Sandman, Curt Connors / Lizard, Carnage, Venom, Wendigo King, Zzzax, Sandman, Chitauri, others	Recurring role	
2013–14	Monsters vs. Aliens	Various characters		
2013–14	Hulk and the Agents of S.M.A.S.H.	Wendigos, Brute Monster, Goom	2 episodes	
2013	Bravoman: Super-Unequaled Hero of Excellence	Dr. Bomb, Anti-Bravo	Web series	
2013	Mickey Mouse	Gubbles, Figaro	Episode: "Gasp!"; Grouped under "With the Voice Talents of"	
2013	Beware the Batman	Mutant Ninjas	Episode: "Sacrifice"	
2013	Lego Marvel Super Heroes: Maximum Overload	Venom, Chitauri		
2013–18	Steven Universe	Lion, various corrupted Gems		
2014	Transformers: Rescue Bots	Buster, Poopsie, Wi-Fido	Episode: "Rescue Dog"	
2014	Hot in Cleveland	George Clooney	Episode: "The Animated Episode"	
2014	Blaze and the Monster Machines		Grouped under "Featuring the Voices of"	
2014–16	The 7D	Dopey, Squire Peckington, Giselle		
2014–18	Star Wars Rebels	Captain Rex, Kassius Konstantine, Commander Wollfe, Captain Gregor, Old Jho, others	Recurring role	
2015	Niko and the Sword of Light	Chompsky, Swamp Kittens		
2015	Goldie & Bear	Worm		
2015	The Mr. Peabody & Sherman Show	Mozart	Episode: "Mozart"	
2015–17	Penn Zero: Part-Time Hero	Various characters		
2015–17	Be Cool, Scooby-Doo!	Various characters		
2015–17	Dawn of the Croods	Squawk, various voices	Recurring role	
2015–18	Miles from Tomorrowland	M.E.R.C., Mr. Xylon, others		
2015–20	Shimmer and Shine	Nahal, Tala and Nazboo, various voices		
2015–20	New Looney Tunes	Squeaks the Squirrel, Daffy Duck, others	Main role	
2016	Transformers: Robots in Disguise	Bludgeon, Clout	Episode: "Misdirection"	
2016	Wander Over Yonder	Bitties	Episode: "The Sky Guy"	
2016	TripTank	Velociraptor, CMN Announcer, Robot	Episode: "Sick Day"	
2016	Home: Adventures with Tip & Oh	Kreegle, Gorg Babies, Gorgantua		
2016–19	The Lion Guard	Baboon Leader, Baby Baboon, Tano, Pim, others	Recurring role	
2016–19	The Powerpuff Girls	Barbarus Bikini, various voices		
2016–20	Elena of Avalor	Various characters	Episode: "Finders Leapers"	
2016–17	Regular Show	Various characters		
2016–17	Lego Star Wars: The Freemaker Adventures	Boba Fett, Ben Quandinaros, Trandoshan Guard		
2016–21	Ben 10	Rath, King Koil, Jetray, additional voices	Main role	
2017	Little Witch Academia	Alcor	Episode: "Blue Moon"	
2017	Bunnicula	Mumkey, Mr. Person	2 episodes	
2017	Teenage Mutant Ninja Turtles	Various voices	Recurring role	
2017	Billy Dilley's Super-Duper Subterranean Summer	Bat, Spider	Episode: "Calzones/Crab Hands"	
2017–present	The Loud House	Charles, Cliff, Walt, Cleopawtra, Nepurrtiti, additional voices	Recurring role	
2017–20	Rapunzel's Tangled Adventure	Various voices		
2017–21	Vampirina	Wolfie, various	Main role	
2018	Supernatural	Phantasm (shared with Fred Tatasciore)	Episode: "Scoobynatural"	
2018	Legend of the Three Caballeros	Ari the Aracuan Bird, various voices		
2018	Clarence	Mr. Cookies, Barkbark, Duncan	Episode: "Dog King Clarence"	
2018–20	Star Wars Resistance	Grevel, Grem, various voices		
2018–20	Big Hero 6: The Series	Nega-Globby, various voices	Recurring role	
2018–20	Harvey Girls Forever!	Various voices		
2018–22	Muppet Babies	Animal, Sweetums, additional voices	Main role	
2019–20	Infinity Train	Ghoms, Monster Atticus		
2019–22	T.O.T.S.	Paulie the Parrot		
2019–22	Amphibia	Bessie, Archie	Recurring role	
2019–22	The Casagrandes	Lalo, Froggy 2, Nico, Keyon, Bitsy, additional voices	Recurring role	
2019–21	Scooby-Doo and Guess Who?	Fish Monster, others	Recurring role	
2019	DC Super Hero Girls	Krypto, Ace, Dog Show Commentator	Episode: "#BeastInShow"	
2019	DuckTales	Bubba the Caveduck, Benjamin Frankloon	Episode: "Timephoon!"	
2019	Robot Chicken	Clone Troopers, Arnold Ernst Toht	Episode: "Musya Shakhtyorov in: Honeyboogers"	
2019	Green Eggs and Ham	Chickeraffe, others		
2019	Milo Murphy's Law	Diogee	2 episodes	
2020	Kipo and the Age of Wonderbeasts	Mandu		
2020	The Mandalorian	Voice Performer – Frog Lady	Episode: "Chapter 10: The Passenger" (Note: For The Mandalorian, Baker also voiced Frog Lady at the beginning of "Chapter 11: The Heiress" but was not credited)	
2020	Glitch Techs	Miko's Dad, various voices		
2020	Animaniacs	Theatrical Minstrel	Episode: "How to Brain Your Dragon"	
2020	The Boss Baby: Back in Business	Various voices	Recurring role	
2020–21	Adventure Time: Distant Lands	Centipede, Crab, Molto Larvo, Waffle Cone Trolls, Snow Golem	3 episodes	
2020–21	Cleopatra in Space	Xerxes, Kek, Assecula		
2021–24	Star Wars: The Bad Batch	The Bad Batch, Clone Troopers, others		
2021–24	Star Trek: Prodigy	Murf, various voices	19 episodes	
2021–24	Kamp Koral: SpongeBob's Under Years	Bubble Bass, Perch Perkins, Kevin C. Cucumber, Craig Mammalton, Kidferatu, various voices	Recurring role	
2021–present	Spidey and His Amazing Friends	Trace-E, CAL the Octobot	Recurring role	
2021–present	The Patrick Star Show	Tinkle, Bubble Bass, Perch Perkins, various voices	Recurring role	
2021	The Croods: Family Tree	Sandy, Belt, Sash		
2021	Maya and the Three	Chiapa, Colibri		
2021	Monsters at Work	Winchester/Banana bread	3 episodes	
2021	Masters of the Universe: Revelation	Teela (Baby), Savage He-Man	2 episodes	
2021–22	Dota: Dragon's Blood	Slyrak, Sagan, various voices		
2022–25	Peacemaker	Voice Performer – Eagly	Recurring role	
2022	Star Wars: Tales of the Jedi	Clone Troopers	2 episodes	
2023	Agent Elvis	Stanley Kubrick	Episode: "Cocaine Tuesdays"	
2023	I Am Groot	Terma Birds	Episode: "Are You My Groot?"	
2023–present	SuperKitties	Sam, Eddie, Budgies, Various	Recurring role	
2023–25	Star Wars: Young Jedi Adventures	Nubs, various voices	Main role	
2024	Star Wars: Tales of the Empire	Clone Trooper	Episode: "Devoted"	
2024	Lego Star Wars: Rebuild the Galaxy	Sgt. "Salty" Sharp, Sullustan X-Wing Pilot, Darth Nubs, Wicket W. Warrick	4 episodes	
2025	Goldie	Romeo, Harold the Yeti		
2025–present	RoboGobo	Wingo, Gill, Hector, Bravo, Polonious		
2025–present	Talon	Luck, Additional Dinosaurs		
2025–present	Mickey Mouse Clubhouse+	Little Helper		
2026	Star Wars: Maul – Shadow Lord	Various (Alien Mechanic, Bully Alien #1, Bully Alien #2, Customer, Henchman #1)	2 episodes	
2026-present	Avatar: Seven Havens	Geet, Ruhi	Main role	

=== Feature films ===
List of voice performances in feature film
Year	Title	Role	Notes	Source
1996	Space Jam	Daffy Duck, Tazmanian Devil, Bull		
1997	A Rat's Tale	Monty Mad-Rat Jr.		
1999	My Brother the Pig	Pig George	live-action animal dub	
2001	The Trumpet of the Swan	Louie		
2001	Shrek	Seventh Dwarf		
2001	Jimmy Neutron: Boy Genius	NORAD Officer		
2003	Pirates of the Caribbean: The Curse of the Black Pearl	Mr. Cotton's Parrot		
2004	Dawn of the Dead	Zombies		
2004	Scooby-Doo 2: Monsters Unleashed	10,000 Volt Ghost, Zombie, Red Eye Skeleton		
2004	The SpongeBob SquarePants Movie	Various voices		
2006	Asterix and the Vikings	Dogmatix, SMS Pigeon		
2006	Happy Feet	Maurice		
2008	Star Wars: The Clone Wars	Clone Troopers		
2009	G-Force	Mooch		
2009	The Haunted World of El Superbeasto	Nazi Zombie		
2009	Astro Boy	Trashcan		
2010	Furry Vengeance	Animal Voice Effects		
2011	Thru the Moebius Strip	Talking Head		
2012	Dino Time	Tyra		
2013	Khumba	Meerkat Father, Dassies		
2014	Postman Pat: The Movie	Pat Wannabe		
2014	The Boxtrolls	Fish, Wheels, Bucket	Nominated-Annie Award for Outstanding Achievement, Voice Acting in an Animated Feature Production, 42nd Annie Awards	
2014	The Snow Queen 2	Luta	Vocalizations, both Russian and English version	
2014	The Hobbit: The Battle of the Five Armies	Creatures		
2015	The Snow Queen 2: Magic of the Ice Mirror	Luta		
2015	The SpongeBob Movie: Sponge Out of Water	Perch Perkins, others		
2015	Star Wars: The Force Awakens	Ilco Munica		
2016	The Snow Queen 3: Fire and Ice	Luta	Vocalizations, both Russian and English version	
2017	Smurfs: The Lost Village	Monty		
2017	All I Want For Christmas Is You	Jack		
2018	The Nun	Demons		
2019	Dora and the Lost City of Gold	Boots		
2019	Charming	Illy, Guards, Unconquerable Beast		
2020	Phineas and Ferb the Movie: Candace Against the Universe	Perry the Platypus, Mama, additional voices	Disney+ exclusive	
2020	Alien Xmas	X	Netflix original film	
2021	The Suicide Squad	Sebastian the Rat		
2021	Shang-Chi and the Legend of the Ten Rings	Morris		
2021	The SpongeBob Movie: Sponge on the Run	Perch Perkins		
2024	The Casagrandes Movie	Lalo		
2024	Saving Bikini Bottom: The Sandy Cheeks Movie	Video Voice		
2024	Spellbound	Flink		
2024	The Wild Robot	Racoons, Squirrels, Badgers		
2025	Plankton: The Movie	Perch Perkins, additional voices		
2025	The King of Kings	Willa the Cat		
2025	Wicked: For Good	Chistery		
2026	Avatar Aang: The Last Airbender	Appa, Momo		
2027	Ice Age: Boiling Point	Jurassic Scrat		
2027	Bad Fairies	Groundbeef		
2028	Untitled Third Phineas and Ferb Movie	Perry the Platypus		

=== Direct-to-video and television films ===
List of voice performances in direct-to-video and television films
Year	Title	Role	Notes	Source
1998–2003	The Wacky Adventures of Ronald McDonald	Sundae, TV Monitor	Also cast in multiple pilot shows and videos for Klasky Csupo	
1998	Men in White	Voice of Subordinate Alien		
1998	The Jungle Book: Mowgli's Story	Bee, Elephant, Turtle 3, Mandrill 2		
1998	An All Dogs Christmas Carol	Additional Cast		
1999	Alvin and the Chipmunks Meet Frankenstein	Tour Guide		
2000	Tom Sawyer	Rebel		
2003	Abra-Catastrophe	Sanjay, Bippy, Binky, Fairy Private, Kid #2		
2003	Stitch! The Movie	David Kawena		
2003	George of the Jungle 2	Water Buffalo, Little Monkey		
2004	Channel Chasers	Big Kid		
2005	Aloha, Scooby-Doo!	Various characters		
2005	Here Comes Peter Cottontail: The Movie	Chunk		
2006	Holly Hobbie and Friends: Surprise Party	Willy Scranton, Bud Cartwright, Cheddar, Doodles, Bonnet		
2006	Codename: Kids Next Door - Operation Z.E.R.O.	Numbuh 4, Delightful Children From Down the Lane, Tommy Gilligan, Toilenator, Mr. Fibb, Joaquin		
2007	Ben 10: Secret of the Omnitrix	Gluto, Wildmutt, Eye Guy, Robotic Lieutenant, Alien Prisoner, Automated Security		
2007	Pooh's Super Sleuth Christmas Movie	Buster, Frost		
2007	Ben 10: Race Against Time	Wildmutt		
2007	The Grim Adventures of the KND	Numbuh 4, Delighful Children From Down the Lane		
2008	Dragonlance: Dragons of Autumn Twilight	Erik, Porthios, Pyros		
2009	Tigger & Pooh and a Musical Too	Buster		
2009	Bionicle: The Legend Reborn	Bone Hunter, Skrall, Vorox		
2009	Ben 10: Alien Swarm	Big Chill		
2010	Scooby-Doo! Abracadabra-Doo	Sherman		
2010	Scooby-Doo! Camp Scare	Ranger Knudsen, Woodsman, Fishman, Specter		
2011	Phineas and Ferb the Movie: Across the 2nd Dimension	Perry the Platypus, Platyborg, Pinky the Chihuahua, Goozim		
2011	Fright Night	Vampires		
2011	Beethoven's Christmas Adventure	Animal Sounds		
2011	Ben 10/Generator Rex: Heroes United	Various characters		
2012	Justice League: Doom	Officer in Charge		
2012	Ben 10: Destroy All Aliens	Stinkfly, Wildmutt, Cash, Carl Tennyson		
2012	Superman vs. The Elite	Atomic Skull		
2012–13	Batman: The Dark Knight Returns	Don	2-part	
2013	Scooby-Doo! Mask of the Blue Falcon	Hideous Hyde Hound, Horten, Minotaur		
2013	Iron Man & Hulk: Heroes United	Zzzax, Dr. Cruler		
2013	Scooby-Doo! Adventures: The Mystery Map	Ye Phantom Parrot, Stu		
2013	Justice League: The Flashpoint Paradox	Etrigan, Top, Canterbury Cricket		
2013	A Monsterous Holiday	Mold Monster, Football Player		
2013	Toy Story of Terror	Mr. Jones	TV special	
2014	Justice League: War	Parademons		
2014	Son of Batman	Man-Bats		
2014	Postman Pat: The Movie	Pat Wanna Be 1		
2014	Scooby-Doo! Frankencreepy	Mr. Burger, Ci Magnus		
2014	Tom and Jerry: The Lost Dragon	Buster, Elf Boy		
2014	Iron Man & Captain America: Heroes United	Dr. Cruler, Hydra Trooper		
2014	Lego DC Comics: Batman Be-Leaguered	Aquaman, Man-Bat		
2014	We Wish You a Merry Walrus	Yarr, Enrique, Puffles		
2015	Justice League: Gods and Monsters	Ray Palmer		
2015	Lego DC Comics Super Heroes: Justice League: Attack of the Legion of Doom	Martian Manhunter, Man-Bat		
2015	Robot Chicken DC Comics Special III: Magical Friendship	Ra's al Ghul		
2016	Lego Scooby-Doo! Haunted Hollywood	Sea Creature, Malt Shop Walt, Zombie		
2016	Legends of the Hidden Temple	Olmec		
2018	Lego DC Comics Super Heroes: Aquaman – Rage of Atlantis	Aquaman, Dex-Starr, Fishy		
2018	Lego DC Comics Super Heroes: The Flash	Aquaman, Captain Boomerang		
2018	Marvel Rising: Secret Warriors	Lockjaw, Tippy-Toe		
2019	Trouble	Nutty Squirrel, Squirrel Pack		
2019	Curious George: Royal Monkey	El Fuego, Fernando		
2020	Lego DC Shazam! Magic and Monsters	Doctor Sivana, Crocodile Man, Jeepers		
2020	The Lego Star Wars Holiday Special	Clone troopers, Grogu, Max Rebo		
2020	Curious George: Go West Go West	Billy, Frick, Frack, Ricochet, Prairie Dog, Sadie, Spitroon		
2021	Arlo the Alligator Boy	Seagull, Purple-Shirted Man		
2021	The Witcher: Nightmare of the Wolf	Creatures		
2021	Curious George: Cape Ahoy	Sea Pup		
2022	Lego Star Wars: Summer Vacation	Boba Fett, BV-RJ, Wicket		
2022	Trick or Treat Scooby-Doo!	Esteban, Mr. Wickles, Cat Man		
2022	Night at the Museum: Kahmunrah Rises Again	Dexter		

=== Video games ===
List of voice performances in video games
Year	Title	Role	Notes	Source
1996	Down in the Dumps	Second-in-Command, Eskimo, Genie, Little John		
1998	Arthur's Math Carnival	Mr. Ratburn		
1998	Baldur's Gate	Caldo, Garrick, Niklos	Grouped under Cast	
1999	Arthur's Thinking Games	Mr. Ratburn		
2000	Arthur's Reading Games	Mr. Ratburn		
2000	Alundra 2	Mephisto, Ratcliffe/Belgar, Mutox, Pirate D		
2000	Ground Control	Deacon Stone, Squad & Dropship Voices		
2000	Spider-Man	Carnage, Rhino, J. Jonah Jameson, Daredevil, Lizard		
2000	Ground Control: Dark Conspiracy	Deacon Stone		
2001–03	JumpStart educational software	Frankie, Edison		
2001	Fallout Tactics: Brotherhood of Steel	VO Talent		
2001	Spider-Man 2: Enter Electro	Electro, Lizard, Hammerhead, Beast, Computer 3, Thug		
2001	Metal Gear Solid 2: Sons of Liberty	SEAL		
2002	Soldier of Fortune II: Double Helix	Alex 'Skip' Larson		
2002	Kingdom Hearts	Wakka		
2002	Treasure Planet: Battle at Procyon	Arcturian Crew, Human Crew, Robot Crew		
2002	Metal Gear Solid 2: Substance	SEALs		
2002	Shrek 2	Bandits, Knights, Peasants		
2002	The Powerpuff Girls: Relish Rampage	Male Children, Monkey Man, Picklord Soldier, Robber	Uncredited	
2002	Star Trek: Starfleet Command III	Romulan Officer		
2003	Tenchu: Wrath of Heaven	English Voices – Actors		
2003	Arc the Lad: Twilight of the Spirits	Densimo		
2003	Lionheart: Legacy of the Crusader	Voiceover Cast		
2003	Extreme Skate Adventure	Voice Talent		
2003	Hunter: The Reckoning – Wayward	Devin Montgomery Lucien, Nephrack, Werewolf		
2003	Star Wars Jedi Knight: Jedi Academy	Jedi 2, Reborn 3, Rockettrooper Officer, Noghri		
2003	Viewtiful Joe	Joe		
2003	The Haunted Mansion	Voice Talent		
2003	SOCOM II U.S. Navy SEALs	Euro Merc, others		
2003	The Hobbit	Gollum		
2003	Final Fantasy X-2	Lord Braska, Benzo, Ayde Ronso		
2003	I-Ninja	Sensei		
2004	Fallout: Brotherhood of Steel	Ching Tsun, Wasteland Man, City Ghoul Civilian		
2004	Champions of Norrath: Realms of EverQuest	Cast		
2004	Onimusha Blade Warriors	Gogandantess		
2004	Onimusha 3: Demon Siege	Heihachiro Honda, Gargant		
2004	Spider-Man 2	Puma, Mysterio, MysterioBot, Train Conductor, Bank Teller, Scientist		
2004	Shellshock: Nam '67	Psycho, US Soldiers, Pilots and Prisoners		
2004	Call of Duty: United Offensive	Private Koppel, Van Dyke, German Soldier		
2004	X-Men Legends	Multiple Man, Nightcrawler, Mutant Prisoner, Morlock Guard, Cyborg Sentinel		
2004	Shark Tale	Additional Tenant Fish		
2004	Halo 2	Gravemind		
2004	Vampire: The Masquerade – Bloodlines	Bertram Tung	Grouped under Voice Over Actors	
2004	Viewtiful Joe 2	Joe, Host of the Award		
2004	The Lord of the Rings: The Battle for Middle-earth	Voice Actors		
2005	Robots	Voices		
2005	Ape Escape: On the Loose	Specter		US English dub
2005	Madagascar	Mort, Little Boy		
2005	Samurai Western	Keeler, Kyril, Nathanael, Nathan		
2005	Destroy All Humans!	Chicken, Cow		
2005	Tak: The Great Juju Challenge	Crug, Dark Juju		
2005	X-Men Legends II: Rise of Apocalypse	Nightcrawler		
2005	The Nightmare Before Christmas: Oogie's Revenge	Barrel, Clown with the Tear Away Face, Hanging Tree	Grouped under "With the Voice Talents of"	
2005	Codename: Kids Next Door – Operation: V.I.D.E.O.G.A.M.E.	Numbuh Four, Delightful Children from Down the Lane (DCFDTL), Toiletnator		
2005	SpongeBob SquarePants: Lights, Camera, Pants!	Squilliam Fancyson, Kevin C. Cucumber, Bubble Bass, Don the Whale, Cannonball Jenkins		
2005	Kingdom of Paradise	Gikyo		
2005	Teen Titans	Cinderblock, Plasmus, Ternion		
2006	The Lord of the Rings: The Battle for Middle-earth II	Voice Actor		
2006	Neopets: Petpet Adventures: The Wand of Wishing	Deep Male NPC, Cyodrake, Dragoyle King, others		
2006	The Da Vinci Code	VO Cast		
2006	X-Men: The Official Game	Additional VO		
2006	Viewtiful Joe: Red Hot Rumble	Viewtiful Joe		
2006	Avatar: The Last Airbender	Appa, Momo, others	Grouped under Voice Talent and under Additional Characters	
2006	Marvel: Ultimate Alliance	Nightcrawler		
2006	Gears of War	Locust Drone A, Theron Guard, Berserker, RAAM	Performed at Video Games Live at San Diego Comic-Con 2008	
2006	Happy Feet	Elephant Seal #2, Alpha Skua, Maurice		
2007	Gurumin: A Monstrous Adventure	Rocko, Digby, Puchi		
2007	The Darkness	Insane Darkling		
2007	Halo 3	Gravemind		
2007	Avatar: The Last Airbender – The Burning Earth	Appa, Momo		
2007	Cars Mater-National Championship	Otto von Flasenbottom	Grouped under Featuring the Voice Talents Of:	
2008	No More Heroes	Letz Shake, Weller		
2008	Spore	Creature vocal effects		
2008	De Blob	Blob, The Prof, Dif, INKYs		
2008	Avatar: The Last Airbender - Into the Inferno	Appa		
2008	SpongeBob SquarePants Featuring Nicktoons: Globs of Doom	Bubble Bass, Globulous Maximus, Old Hermit Crab		
2008	Ben 10: Alien Force	Humungousaur, Jet Ray, Swampfire, Big Chill, Spidermonkey, Pickaxe Alien, DNAlien		
2008	Gears of War 2	RAAM, Theron Guard, Locust Drone, Sires		
2009	Star Wars: The Clone Wars - Republic Heroes	Clone Troopers		
2009	Cars Race-O-Rama	Voice Talent		
2009	Ben 10 Alien Force: Vilgax Attacks	Psyphon, various Omnitrix aliens		
2009	Left 4 Dead 2	Infected		
2009	The Secret Saturdays: Beasts of the 5th Sun	Various Cryptids		
2009	Cartoon Network Universe: FusionFall	Numbuh 4, Toilenator, Echo Echo, Swampfire, Humungousaur, AmpFibian		
2010	Dante's Inferno	Death		
2010	Batman: The Brave and the Bold – The Videogame	Clock King, Copperhead	Grouped under Cast	
2010	Ben 10 Alien Force: The Rise of Hex	Various Omnitrix aliens		
2010	Ben 10 Ultimate Alien: Cosmic Destruction	Various Omnitrix aliens, SevenSeven, Psyphon		
2010	Star Wars: The Force Unleashed II	Boba Fett, Baron Merillion Tarko		
2010	Marvel Super Hero Squad: The Infinity Gauntlet	Annihilus		
2010	SpongeBob and the Clash of Triton	Perch Perkins	Grouped under Special Thanks	
2011	Lego Star Wars III: The Clone Wars	Clone Troopers		
2011	Portal 2	Atlas, P-Body		
2011	Shadows of the Damned	Demons		
2011	Gears of War 3	Theron Guard, Locust Drone		
2011	Rage	Voice Talent		
2011	Batman: Arkham City	Ra's al Ghul	Grouped under Voice-Over Actors	
2011	Ben 10: Galactic Racing	Swampfire, Ultimate Cannonbolt, Ultimate Humongousaur, Big Chill, Spidermonkey, Fasttrack, Ultimate Echo Echo, AmpFibian, HeatBlast		
2012	Kinect Star Wars	Fode & Beed, Boba Fett, Trandoshan Commando, Felucian Farmers, Battle Droids		
2012	Diablo III	Monster Voice Effects		
2012	Ben 10: Omniverse	Psyphon, Wildmutt, Wildvine, Queen Ant		
2013	Dota 2	Techies		
2013	Kingdom Hearts HD 1.5 Remix	Wakka		
2013	Lego Marvel Super Heroes	Mister Fantastic, Sandman, Doctor Octopus	Grouped under VO Talent	
2013	Ben 10: Omniverse 2	Astrodactyl, Big Chill, Crashhopper		
2013	Phineas and Ferb: Quest for Cool Stuff	Perry the Platypus	Grouped under VO Talent	
2014	The Legend of Korra	Naga, 3 Spirits, others		
2014	Lego Batman 3: Beyond Gotham	Brainiac		
2014	World of Warcraft: Warlords of Draenor	Voice Over Cast		
2015	Saints Row: Gat out of Hell	Demons		
2015	Destiny	Variks, the Loyal		
2015	Heroes of the Storm	Murky		
2015	Minecraft: Story Mode	Reuben		
2015	Batman: Arkham Knight	Ra's al Ghul	Season of Infamy DLC	
2015	Disney Infinity 3.0	Boba Fett, Perry the Platypus	Grouped Under "Featuring the Voice Talents"	
2016	Gears of War 4	Swarm		
2017	Star Wars Battlefront II	Clone troopers		
2018	Overwatch	Hammond	Introduced in July 2018 update	
2018	Lego DC Super-Villains	Clock King, DeSaad		
2019	Gears 5	Swarm Drones, RAAM		
2019	Star Wars Jedi: Fallen Order	Clone Troopers		
2020	Destiny 2: Beyond Light	Variks	Expansion pack to Destiny 2	
2020	Rocket Arena	Leef	Season 2	
2022	Lego Star Wars: The Skywalker Saga	Clone Troopers, Jango Fett		
2023	SpongeBob SquarePants: The Cosmic Shake	Citizens, Herald, Sanitation Police Officer		
2023	Avatar: The Last Airbender - Quest for Balance	Hei Bai		
2023	Dead Space (2023)	Creature Vocalizations		
2024	Star Wars Outlaws	Nix		
2025	Nicktoons & The Dice of Destiny	Momo, Enemies		
2025	SpongeBob SquarePants: Titans of the Tide	Squilliam Fancyson, Citizens		
2026	Gears of War: E-Day	RAAM	The Coalition audio lead, Edward Bauman, confirmed Baker’s involvement in the game via his Instagram page.	
2026	Star Wars: Zero Company	Trick, Clone Troopers		

=== Other voice-over roles ===
- California Screamin' (2003–10) theme park attraction – Original host
- Pirates of the Caribbean theme park attraction – Parrot
- Star Tours: The Adventures Continue theme park attraction – Boba Fett
- Video Games Live with the San Diego Symphony (San Diego Comic-Con 2008 performance only) – Performer
- Shelf Life (2011–14) – Samurai Snake – web series by Yuri Lowenthal and Tara Platt
- Special Relativity (2015) radio series – Prince of the Pigeon People, General Fith

== As actor ==
=== Television ===
List of live-action acting performances in television
Year	Title	Role	Notes	Source
1993–95, 2021–22	Legends of the Hidden Temple	Olmec	Also announcer	
1996	Night Stand with Dick Dietrick	Grant	Episode: "The Unwed Mothers Show"	
1997–2000	The Journey of Allen Strange	Phil Berg		
1999–2003 (Note: The dates shown on Shop 'til You Drop are for the Pax broadcast of the show from 1999 to 2003 according to Brooks & Marsh. Stanley Entertainment lists his work range from 1997 to 2002.)	Shop 'til You Drop	Announcer, Co-Host	Aired on Pax Network	
1999	G vs E	C. Arthur Troust	Episode: "Cliffhanger"	
2010	Big Time Rush	Mr. Smitty	Episode: "Big Time School of Rocque"	
2026–present	Avatar: The Last Airbender	Appa, Momo		

=== Film ===
List of live-action acting performances in film
Year	Title	Role	Notes	Source
2013	I Know That Voice	Himself	Documentary	
