= Reality Remix =

Reality Remix is a daily, half-hour American television show that recaps events in the world of reality television.

It was one of the original shows on the Fox Reality Channel. Reality Remix was hosted by former MTV veejay Lisa Kennedy Montgomery, and featured a number of correspondents. These included Mark Long, Amanda Avila, Todd Newton, Lynn Warren & Alex Ali, JD Roberto and Nathan "Nate" Gonzalez. There was also a round table interview segment with Erin Murphy, Anna David and B-side.

The daily edition of Reality Remix aired Monday through Friday at 7:30/4:30 PM ET/PT (the show was pre-empted on Thursdays during the American Idol Extra in season 2). An hour-long Weekend Edition aired on Saturdays at 10:00/7:00 PM ET/PT, and episodes were also available on the show's website.

The 500th episode aired on July 12, 2007.

Reality Remix was canceled in 2008, and eventually replaced by Reality Binge which took on a more cynical look at reality TV.
