= The Avant-Garde (duo) =

American psychedelic pop duo

- Origin: United States
- Genres: Psychedelic pop
- Years active: 1967–1968
- Labels: Columbia
- Past members: Elkin "Bubba" Fowler; Chuck Woolery

The Avant-Garde was an American psychedelic pop duo formed by Chuck Woolery and Elkin "Bubba" Fowler in 1967. They released three singles on Columbia Records in 1967 and 1968, backed by different session musicians on each release: "Yellow Beads", "Naturally Stoned" (which hit No. 40 on the Billboard Hot 100 chart in mid-1968), and "Fly with Me!". Despite the success of "Naturally Stoned", the group disbanded after "Fly with Me!" and never released a full album.

== Careers after The Avant-Garde disbanded ==
=== Fowler ===
After The Avant-Garde disbanded, Fowler went on to a career as a folk singer. Columbia released his LP And Then Came Bubba in 1970. He played guitar on albums by Bob Dylan and Leonard Cohen.

Fowler played on the track "Avalanche" by Leonard Cohen, featured on the album Original Seeds: Songs That Inspired Nick Cave and The Bad Seeds. Ron Cornelius and Charlie Daniels also played on the track.

=== Woolery ===
Woolery became a country music artist on Warner Bros. Records and later Epic Records, charting twice with two distinct selections but never releasing an actual full-length album. He subsequently became a game show host, appearing on Wheel of Fortune for its first years on the air, Scrabble, the dating shows Love Connection and The Dating Game, Greed, and Lingo. The Avant-Garde's song "Naturally Stoned" was also used as the theme for a reality television series on GSN that starred Woolery, titled Chuck Woolery: Naturally Stoned in 2003. This series was short-lived, lasting only six episodes.

Woolery died on November 23, 2024, at the age of 83.
