= Dee Bradley Baker =

American voice actor (born 1962)

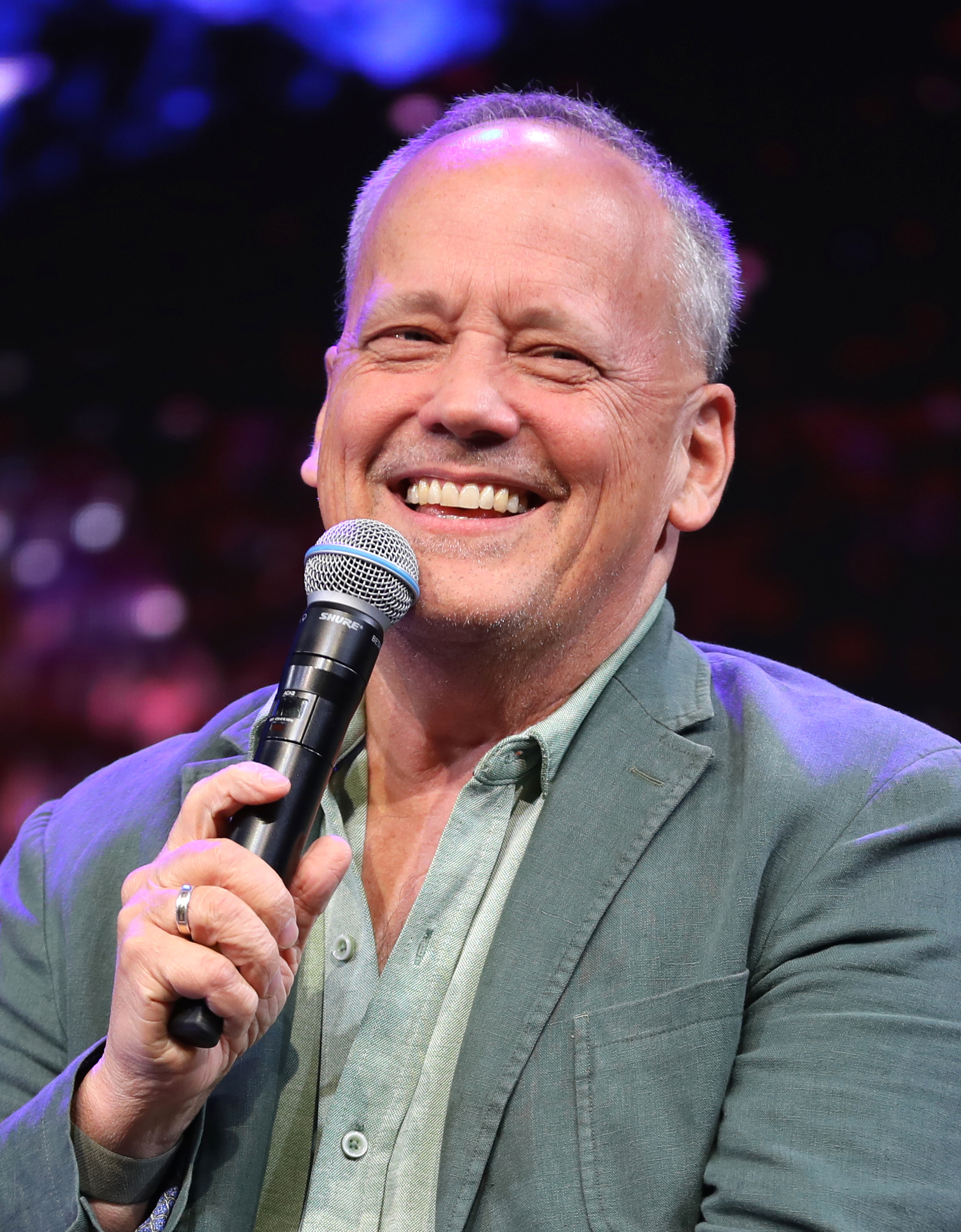
- Baker in 2024
- Born: August 31, 1962 (age 64); Bloomington, Indiana, U.S.
- Education: Colorado College (BA)
- Occupation: Voice actor
- Years active: 1989–present
- Works: Full list
- Spouse: Michelle Brown (m. 1990)
- Children: 2
- Website: deebaker.com

Dee Bradley Baker (born August 31, 1962) is an American voice actor. Much of his work has consisted of vocalizations of animals and monsters. Baker's roles include animated series such as Adventure Time, Avatar: The Last Airbender, Ben 10, Codename: Kids Next Door, Gravity Falls, Phineas and Ferb, SpongeBob SquarePants, and Steven Universe. His voice work in live-action series includes Legends of the Hidden Temple and Shop 'til You Drop, as well as films such as Space Jam and The Boxtrolls.

Baker is especially known for his work on various Star Wars television series, mainly as the voice of Captain Rex and other clone troopers in Star Wars: The Clone Wars, Star Wars Rebels, and Star Wars: The Bad Batch as well as multiple characters in Star Wars: Maul – Shadow Lord. He has also voiced characters in video games including Halo, Gears of War, Destiny, Overwatch, Dota 2, Left 4 Dead 2 and Portal 2.

== Early life ==
Baker was born on August 31, 1962, in Bloomington, Indiana, United States, to Nancy Ann (née McCaslin; 1935–2007) and Edwin Dee "Buddy" Baker (1932–2023), and grew up in Greeley, Colorado. He has one sister and one brother. He started performing at the age of nine and steadily worked in musicals, operas, plays, and stand-up comedy. As a child, he was a fan of Star Trek, Star Wars, Planet of the Apes, and the music of Frank Zappa; he also had an interest in insects, arthropods, and dinosaurs. He graduated from University High School in 1981 and received a Boettcher Scholarship.

Baker attended Colorado College in Colorado Springs, Colorado, where he studied philosophy, biology, fine arts, and German, the last of which he studied overseas for a year at the University of Göttingen. He was involved in local theater productions and singing groups. After graduating with a BA in philosophy in 1986, he was involved in many community theater projects, including a sketch comedy movie that aired on local public television.

== Career ==
=== Legends of the Hidden Temple ===
In 1989, Baker moved to Orlando, Florida, where he worked on an improv sketch comedy show titled The Anacomical Players at EPCOT Center's Wonders of Life pavilion and joined various projects for Disney and Universal Studios. His first major experience on national television was on the Nickelodeon game show Legends of the Hidden Temple from 1993 to 1995, where he was not only the announcer, but also the giant talking rock-god Olmec. He portrayed Olmec with a "big, booming, loud, god-like voice". During parts of the show, he would narrate a legend, and then ask the kid contestants related trivia questions. The show lasted three seasons and 120 episodes. When host Kirk Fogg moved to Los Angeles, he was encouraged to move there as well. In 2016, he and Fogg reprised their roles for a live action television movie adaptation of the show. He reprised his role of Olmec again when Legends was revived in 2021 on The CW.

=== Early voice acting career ===
Baker moved to Southern California about a year before the 1994 Northridge earthquake. He got involved in voice-over work; his first major character was Cow & Chicken's dad in the Cow & Chicken and I Am Weasel cartoons. His first feature film voice-over was on the basketball-themed Looney Tunes film Space Jam where he voiced Daffy Duck, Taz and Toro. He did voice work for various episodic and recurring cartoon characters in The Real Adventures of Jonny Quest, Johnny Bravo, Dexter's Laboratory, SpongeBob SquarePants, and The Powerpuff Girls. He voiced starring characters Og in Mike, Lu & Og and Bagheera in the second season of Jungle Cubs. In 2001, he added voice roles for Sanjay, Binky and other characters for The Fairly OddParents and co-starred as Mandy's father on Billy and Mandy. He had a lead role as Numbuh 4 in Codename: Kids Next Door.

On the live-action front, he became the co-host and announcer for the game show Shop 'til You Drop which spanned several hundred episodes when it resumed broadcasting on the Family Channel (of which he was their announcer in 1999) and on the Pax television network, until a series retool in 2003; it was produced by Stone Stanley Entertainment, which had earlier co-produced Legends of the Hidden Temple. He also had an on-screen recurring role as Phil Berg in the Nickelodeon sitcom series The Journey of Allen Strange where he plays a crazed journalist who tries to expose Allen's identity as a space alien.

=== Animal and creature characterizations ===
Starting with gigs on The Wild Thornberrys, he voiced an assortment of animal characters, which would become one of his specialties. He voiced Pig George in the live action animal film My Brother the Pig. Baker has also been involved with television shows for younger children including: Dora the Explorer where he provided animal sounds; Mickey Mouse Clubhouse where he voices Boo Boo Chicken; Curious George where he voices Gnocchi, My Friends Tigger & Pooh where he voices Buster the dog and Jake and the Neverland Pirates (airing on Disney Junior) where he voices Tick-Tock the crocodile. In Avatar: The Last Airbender where he voiced the creatures Appa and Momo and would soon voice many other creatures in the series as well as its sequel, The Legend of Korra, where he voices Naga, Pabu and Oogi. He voiced in the American Dragon: Jake Long and Ben 10 series, the latter of which he voiced many alien creatures such as Stinkfly and Wildmutt. Baker also appeared in the Ben 10 sequel series Ben 10: Alien Force, Ben 10: Ultimate Alien and Ben 10: Omniverse, as well as its live-action adaptations and the show's reboot. In Alien Force and Ultimate Alien, Baker voiced a majority of the Omnitrix aliens. Omniverse art director Derrick J. Wyatt noted that the production team had to allow other voice actors to do some of the aliens in the later series because Baker was doing almost all of them and some of the characters were putting a strain on his throat. Outside of television, he provided the voice of Captain Jack Sparrow's talking parrot in the refurbished Pirates of the Caribbean rides at Disneyland and the Magic Kingdom.

In 2007, Baker got the role of Perry the Platypus in the Disney series Phineas and Ferb. At the 2013 San Diego Comic-Con panel, Baker mentioned that when he auditioned, he was asked to provide three different creature sounds, regardless of whether it actually sounded like a platypus, of which one was selected as Perry's characteristic sound. Perry has become a breakout character for the series, with Baker appearing at multiple Comic-Con panels for the show. In 2014, Perry was nominated for a Nickelodeon Kids' Choice Award for Best Animal Sidekick. Coincidentally, another one of Baker's voiced characters, Waddles the pet pig in Gravity Falls, was nominated for the same category. He provides the voice of Eagly, the eagle, in HBO's TV series Peacemaker.

=== Further animation voice-over work ===
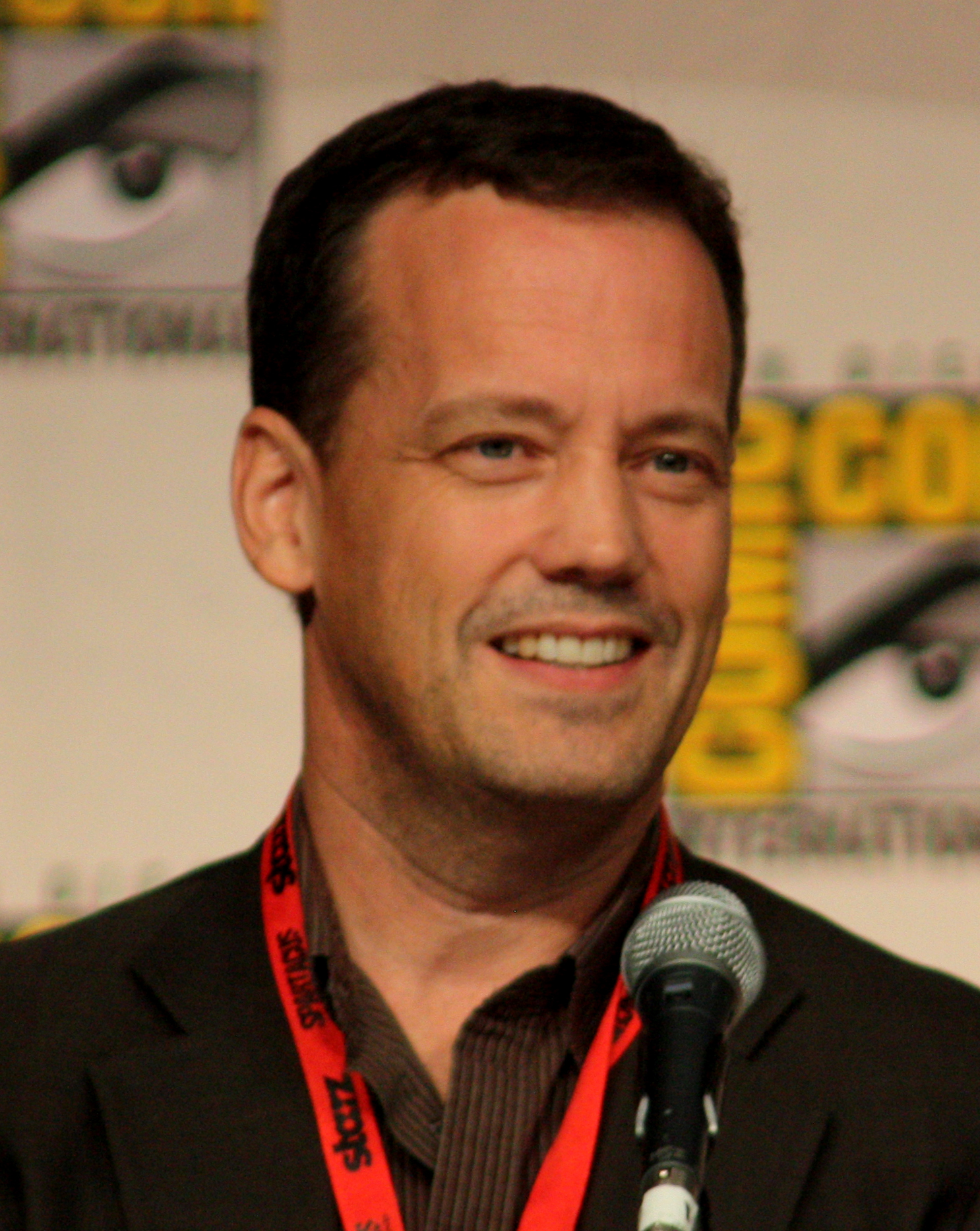
Baker at the 2009 San Diego Comic-Con

In 2005, Baker landed a role as Klaus Heisler, an Olympic ski jumper from (East-)Germany who was body-swapped into a goldfish, in the primetime cartoon sitcom American Dad! The series has run for 20 seasons on Fox and TBS. In an interview with Pop Break, Baker said that he liked playing Klaus because he loves the German language, the part was well written, and it is not stressful on his voice. He compared the rehearsals to being on The Carol Burnett Show. He participated in American Dad panels at San Diego Comic-Con in 2010, 2012, and 2014; and the New York Comic Con in 2014. In 2017, he received a nomination for the Primetime Emmy Award for Outstanding Character Voice-Over Performance for Klaus in the episode "Fight or Flight". He also voices other characters on the show, most notably Rogu, a homunculi tumor that came off of Roger.

His voicing of council member Tarrlok in Korra garnered a nomination for the Behind the Voice Actors (BTVA) Voice Acting Award in 2012. In addition to television shows, Baker voiced characters in many animated and live action animation films, including some of the classic ghost monsters in Scooby-Doo 2: Monsters Unleashed, and Maurice in Happy Feet. He also had roles in the Scooby-Doo! Mystery Incorporated TV series and its direct-to-video releases.

Baker was involved in the Star Wars: The Clone Wars film released in 2008 and its television series afterwards which ran for seven seasons. He provided the voices for not only the characters Captain Rex and Commander Cody, but also all the supporting clone troopers, the last of which he received an Annie Award nomination for Voice Acting in a Television Production in 2012. He has also reprised the role of Captain Rex in Star Wars Rebels, beginning with its second season. He also provided the voice of Boba Fett for Star Tours – The Adventures Continue. In the 2011 Family Guy episode "It's a Trap!", a parody of the Star Wars film Return of the Jedi, he voiced Klaus as Admiral Ackbar. In 2021, he reprised the role of the clones in the Clone Wars spin-off The Bad Batch, including the titular group of experimental clones. In 2023, he was announced as a voice actor in the Star Wars Outlaws video game, playing Nix, Kay Vess's loyal companion.

=== Video games, more voice acting, and other projects ===
In the video game world, Baker reprised his roles in Cartoon Network and Nickelodeon's multitude of show-related game releases. He provided the voice for Otto Von Fassenbottom, a German race car in the 2007 video game, Cars Mater-National Championship. He also voiced Gravemind in Halo 2 and Halo 3, and the title character Joe in the Viewtiful Joe series released from 2003 to 2005. He provided the creature sounds for the Spore video game which allows players to create and evolve their own creatures.At the 2008 San Diego Comic-Con opening night, he was a featured performer at the Video Games Live concert, where he voiced characters from Gears of War and other series. He provided voices for two Blizzard Entertainment characters – Murky, a baby murloc in Heroes of the Storm, and Hammond, a genetically engineered hamster in Overwatch. He voiced multiple characters from the De Blob series. He is also the voice of Jockey, Charger, Spitter and the common infected in Left 4 Dead 2, released in 2009, of the Death in Dante's Inferno, released in 2010, and Atlas and P-body in Portal 2, released in 2011. He also voiced Reuben the pig in Minecraft: Story Mode in 2014.

In 2014, Baker continued participating in American Dad, Gravity Falls, and a fourth season of The Legend of Korra. He voiced Dopey in the Disney XD series The 7D; and Fish, Wheels and Bucket in The Boxtrolls film, in which he was nominated for an Annie Award for voicing Fish. In the Lego Batman 3: Beyond Gotham video game, he voiced Brainiac. He voiced George Clooney and his dog in "The Animated Episode" of the TV Land series Hot in Cleveland. In 2020, he voiced the hero Leef in Rocket Arena.

Baker has appeared on various panels at Comic-Con and other conventions where he talks about voice acting in general. He also created a website called IWantToBeAVoiceActor.com, where he answers frequently-asked questions about voice acting and gives advice. The site has been cited by fellow voice actors Steve Blum and Rob Paulsen as a valuable resource for getting into voice acting.

== Personal life ==
Baker met his wife Michelle Brown when they were doing children's theatre at the Colorado Springs Fine Arts Center. They married in 1990, and have two daughters. They live in Los Angeles.

Outside of voice acting, Baker enjoys photography, mostly taking pictures of small flowers and insects. He is fluent in German.

== Awards and nominations ==
Year	Organisation	Category	Project	Result	Ref.
2017	Primetime Emmy Awards	Outstanding Character Voice-Over Performance	American Dad! (for "Fight and Flight")	Nominated	
2025	Children's and Family Emmy Awards	Outstanding Voice Performer in a Preschool Animated Program	Star Wars: Young Jedi Adventures	Nominated	
