= Eric Toms =

American stand-up comedian, writer, actor and television personality

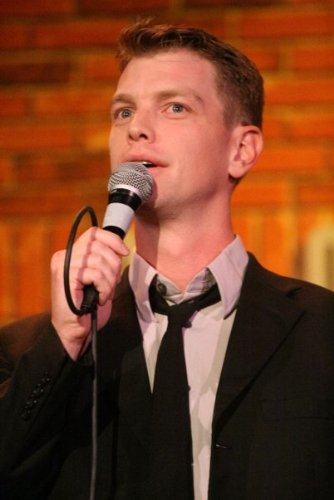
- Toms performing at the Improv in San Jose, CA
- Born: August 17, 1979 (age 46) San Jose, California, USA
- Education: San Jose State University (drop-out)
- Occupations: Actor, Comedian, Writer, Producer
- Years active: 1999-present
- Spouse: Heather (m. 2005)
- Children: Nicholas (b. 2010), Fletcher (b. 2012)

Eric Toms (born August 17, 1979 in San Jose, California) is an American stand-up comedian, writer, actor and television personality, who most notably was the host of Fox Reality Channel’s Reality Binge.

== Early life ==
Toms was born in San Jose, California, to Dottie Toms, a florist and high school lunch lady, and James Toms, a mutual funds broker. His parents divorced when he was eight and although his parents had joint custody, Toms was primarily raised by his mother and two sisters, Stephanie and Nicole.

Toms attended various schools, including Laurelwood Elementary, Peterson Middle School, and Wilcox High School, where his mother worked as a lunch lady. He excelled in high school and starred in a number of plays, but his grades and SAT scores were not very attractive to colleges, despite being in honors classes. Toms applied to but was rejected from UC Santa Cruz, UCLA, and Santa Clara University. At the suggestion of his father, Toms applied and gained entree to San Jose State University. He attended classes for 9 months before dropping out.

== Career ==
After dropping out of San Jose State University in 1998, Eric joined the theater group Big Lil’s in downtown San Jose. Two years after joining, the group created a sketch troupe called “SUTN” and Toms became a cast member, head writer and video producer. The group was signed to a television deal with KRON4 and produced over 50 shows before moving to UPN in San Francisco to produce another 12. Making the leap to stand-up comedy Eric traveled the world and by 25 had already worked with some of his comedy heroes, such as Kevin Pollak, Norm Macdonald, Lewis Black, Tracy Morgan and Bobby Slayton. In 2008, Toms won the host role and became a story producer for the comedy clip show Reality Binge on Fox Reality Channel. Working on Reality Binge later led to a guest appearance on Good Day LA and a number of other panel shows. He guest starred as Gilroy Smith in the Sonny With a Chance season 1 finale "Sonny: So Far". Since then Eric’s writing has won recognition with The Academy of Arts and Sciences. Eric has also written and performed commercial campaigns for brands such as 7-11, Netflix, and Cholula Hot Sauce.

== Film roles ==
In 2001 Toms began his film career in the low-budget indie film Pins and Needles. He went on to perform in the historical drama Valley of the Heart’s Delight with the late Pete Postlethwaite. In 2008 Toms performed in Growing Out, a film by childhood friends, Graham and Garett Ratliff. Most recently Toms starred in the raunchy college comedy DisOrientation distributed by Spotlight Pictures, in which Eric was nominated for the Jury Award at the New Haven Film Festival.

== Personal life ==
Toms married his long-time girlfriend Heather Plep, an advertising and marketing specialist, on October 15, 2005 in Santa Cruz, California. Toms's high school friend and former roommate Mike Hogan was the best man at his wedding. The couple has two children together, Nicholas (b. 2010) and Fletcher (b. 2012).

Toms's mother briefly appeared on his late night sketch show Seriously Unusual Television Network which aired in Toms's home town of San Jose in the early 2000s.

== Kidney donation ==
In the fall of 2011 Toms's long time friend, Michael Hogan, was diagnosed with kidney failure. After months of searching for a donor, Toms volunteered to give his kidney to his friend. What followed was several months of testing for both for Hogan and Toms. In early 2012 it was determined that Toms was a match and that both men were physically capable of surviving the surgery.

The transplant took place on May 4, 2012 at the Connie Frank Transplant Center at UCSF. It was hailed as a success and both men began their road to recovery. In the months to come, Hogan contracted meningitis, common in transplant recipients. Despite the early detection and treatment, Hogan died on March 9, 2013.
