= The Chuck Woolery Show =

American television talk show

- Genre: Talk show
- Presented by: Chuck Woolery
- Narrated by: Randy West
- Country of origin: United States
- Original language: English
- No. of seasons: 1
- No. of episodes: 65

Production
- Executive producers: Eric Lieber; Chuck Woolery
- Producers: Charles Colarusso; Jake Tauber; Bruce McKay; Eric Lieber
- Production locations: Hollywood Center Studios, Hollywood, California
- Running time: 60 minutes with commercials
- Production companies: Eric Lieber Productions; Charwool Productions

Original release
- Network: broadcast syndication
- Release: September 16 – December 13, 1991

The Chuck Woolery Show is an American talk show hosted by television personality Chuck Woolery. The show frequently featured Woolery conducting interviews with various celebrities. Randy West served as the show's announcer; this was among his first handful of national series, his second announcing assignment for a Group W syndicated show, following Hour Magazine.

The Chuck Woolery Show premiered in daytime syndication on September 16, 1991, and was a joint production of Eric Lieber Productions and Charwool Productions, Inc. (the latter a joint venture between Woolery and Charles Colarusso, who served as one of the show's producers). The program was distributed by Westinghouse Broadcasting through its Group W Productions subsidiary and was based at Hollywood Center Studios in Los Angeles.

== Personnel ==
In addition to his duties as host, Woolery served as a co-executive producer with Eric Lieber, who was also producing Love Connection in syndication with Woolery hosting. Charles Colarusso, a veteran television producer, was one of the show's producers with former Goodson-Todman Productions producer Jake Tauber and former Divorce Court and Tomorrow producer Bruce McKay joining him and Lieber.

== Opening ==
Each episode of The Chuck Woolery Show opened with a skateboard positioned somewhere on the Hollywood Walk of Fame. A person wearing blue Chuck Taylor All-Stars would run up to it and jump on it, with the camera panning up to reveal Woolery riding the skateboard.

As the show's theme song played, Woolery (or, to be precise, a stunt double) rode the skateboard along the sidewalk, doing tricks and dodging pedestrians on his way into the studio, making it inside just before the door to the stage closed behind him.

== Format ==
The Chuck Woolery Show, like some other shows of the day, was a celebrity-driven show. Each episode featured four celebrities, and Woolery would spend several minutes talking with each one individually. The interview area was set up much like the way the stage was set up on The Arsenio Hall Show, with a lounge chair for Woolery to sit in and a couch for the guests as opposed to the usual desk and chair setup so many other celebrity talk shows have used.

Also, like many talk shows of its ilk, The Chuck Woolery Show employed a live band to play in the studio. The ensemble was led by the show's music director Dana Robbins, who at the time was a widely regarded session player whose specialty is the saxophone and who currently is the lead saxophone player in Delbert McClinton's backing band.

The show would sometimes feature a studio audience member ask questions to each of the four guests for a particular day.

== Further information ==
The Chuck Woolery Show was sold in 70 percent of the United States by the time the 1991 NATPE convention, during which many syndicated programs are pitched and sold to stations, was held. The show's pilot featured Mark Hudson, who had previously led the band for Fox's Late Show, as the bandleader, Dean Goss as announcer, and guests Bob Saget, James Garner, Kim Coles, and Jack Hanna.

Orion Television was set to distribute the series with Group W handling advertising sales. As such, every station that Westinghouse Broadcasting owned (with the exception of KDKA-TV in Pittsburgh) cleared the show as did KCAL-TV in Los Angeles, which the company had been trying to purchase (ultimately failing). Many NBC affiliates, where audiences had familiarity with Woolery due to his years hosting the game shows Wheel of Fortune and Scrabble on the network, also signed on, including WPXI in Pittsburgh and WMAQ-TV in Chicago, which the network owned. In New York City, the nation's largest media market, NBC's competitor CBS bought Woolery's show for its flagship station WCBS-TV.

Despite the clearances, trouble plagued the production from the start. First, the show lost its distributor shortly after the NATPE convention. Orion Pictures, the parent company of Orion Television, had been in significant financial trouble for much of the previous year and suspended all of its operations in early 1991. Group W was forced to step in and assume distributorship as well, but some prospective affiliates decided to drop the program and some markets never picked it up.

The Chuck Woolery Show was one of five talk shows that made their debut for the 1991-92 season, joining shows hosted by Jenny Jones, Jerry Springer, Maury Povich, and Montel Williams. Of those five, the lowest ratings belonged to Woolery, but Group W decided to put its support behind him and gave the show a commitment for a full season.

However, a significant turn of events took place several weeks into the run that ultimately proved fatal for the program. New York, WCBS was facing off against the popular Live with Regis and Kathie Lee on WABC-TV with Woolery, which put the show up against an established daytime presence that aired live in the Eastern United States in many of its markets. As such, the show was struggling to make a mark in the ratings. However, WCBS was not willing to give up yet as it was still early in the season, and there was still the full season commitment from Group W to consider.

In an anecdotal story that was shared by show announcer Randy West, Lieber was talking with the program director at WCBS during this time over the telephone. The two men got into a heated discussion over the show's performance, and the program director was said to be so angered by Lieber's conduct that he decided to retaliate by exiling The Chuck Woolery Show to its overnight lineup within days of the phone call. WCBS' decision was the first in what would be a long line of affiliates choosing to move Woolery off of their daytime lineups, if not dropping it altogether, and Group W reversed its decision; the syndicator announced it would be ceasing production shortly thereafter, with only sixty-five episodes over thirteen weeks being produced.

Woolery continued hosting Love Connection while his talk show was in production; once the talk show was canceled, he was able to focus primarily on his position there and would remain as host of the show until it ended its run in 1994.
