= Greed (British game show) =

- Genre: Game show
- Presented by: Jerry Springer
- Voices of: Greg Burns
- Composer: Graham Ness
- Country of origin: United Kingdom
- Original language: English
- No. of series: 1
- No. of episodes: 11

Production
- Production location: Fountain Studios
- Running time: 60 minutes (inc. adverts)
- Production company: Grundy

Original release
- Network: Channel 5
- Release: 18 May – 9 June 2001

Greed (stylised as Gr££d) is a British television game show based on the American version of the same title. The series, which was very short-lived in the UK, offered a £1,000,000 top prize; it was hosted by Jerry Springer.

The series was announced on 8 March 2001, and aired from 18 May to 9 June of that year. It was officially cancelled on 24 October 2001.

== Gameplay ==
Qualifying game

At the start of each game, 6 contestants entered the studio and stood behind a desk which rose from the floor as they approached. Jerry Springer then asked a question which had a numerical answer. Each contestant then keyed in an answer. The player who was the closest to the correct answer became the team leader. The player furthest from the correct answer left immediately, while the other 4 players formed the team.

Main game

The main game has 8 rounds. Each round has one or multiple answers, to be selected from a list of choices. To complete the round and win the money, the team must select all correct choices, otherwise they lose and leave with nothing. After each round, the team is given the choice to leave with the money won or risk it on the next round. The leader has the rights to make the decision.

=== Round 1: £5,000 ===
A multiple choice question with 4 choices was asked to the first player on the team (not the team leader), in which only one was correct. The team leader could then choose to accept or change it accordingly. The money won at this stage (and any other stages) is shared equally between all players. This continued for:

=== Round 2: £10,000 ===
Played the same way as Round 1; the second player on the team answers.

=== Round 3: £25,000 ===
Played the same way as the last two rounds; the third player on the team answers.

=== Round 4: £50,000 ===
Played the same way as the last three rounds; the last player on the team answers.

After each round starting from round 4, the Terminator game became active. A light would flick between the players and stop on one random player. This player then had a choice, either to:

A) continue on as normal or,

B) take on a head-to-head buzzer question against a player of their choice. The loser is out of the game and the winner takes the share of the loser, ultimately winning more than other active players. By doing this they are also given a guaranteed £5,000 no matter what happens after that point.

=== Round 5: £100,000 ===
The question had 4 correct choices from 6. Each remaining player gave an answer. The team leader could then change only one of them.

Starting from this round, the team leader could use the freebie card to eliminate an incorrect answer if needed, and Springer explain the matter of the question.

Also, the Terminator comes into play prior to asking question 5.

=== Round 6: £250,000 ===
Similar to round 5, a question was asked and each player gave one answer they thought was correct. At this stage there were 7 possible choices, 4 of which were correct. Starting from this round, if there were fewer than 4 players remaining, the team leader could give the remaining answers or request another player to answer.

=== Round 7: £500,000 ===
In this round, there would be 4 correct choices from 8. Similar to the USA version, a "bailout" option would be offered if 3 correct answers are revealed, in which the team leader is given a substantial amount of money to end the game; however, by accepting this the other players lost all of their money up to that point, leaving with nothing.

=== Round 8: £1,000,000 ===
The final question would have 9 choices, 4 of which are correct. The "bailout" option would be offered again, much like round 7.
