= Chuck Woolery: Naturally Stoned =

American reality television show

- Genre: Reality
- Starring: Chuck Woolery
- Country of origin: United States
- Original language: English
- No. of seasons: 1
- No. of episodes: 6

Production
- Producer: Phil Gurin
- Running time: 20–22 minutes
- Production companies: Laurelwood Entertainment; Red Skies Entertainment; Game Show Network Originals

Original release
- Network: Game Show Network
- Release: June 15 – July 27, 2003

Chuck Woolery: Naturally Stoned is an American reality television show that starred American game show host Chuck Woolery. Six episodes aired on Game Show Network (GSN) between June 15 and July 27, 2003.

The series is centered around Woolery and his family, specifically his personal life and his work as host of GSN's original game show Lingo. The show placed strain on both Woolery's workload and his marriage, and was met with generally negative reception.

== Format ==
The show focuses on the life of Chuck Woolery, at the time host of the Game Show Network (GSN) series Lingo. The series' title, "Naturally Stoned", is derived from a Billboard Top 40 song from 1968 by Woolery's former music group The Avant-Garde. The show uses the song in its opening credits. Each half-hour episode combines elements from Woolery's personal life and a behind-the-scenes look at Lingo. The show also introduces viewers to the Woolery family's new residence in Park City, Utah, having moved there from Los Angeles in August 2002. When discussing how the show is produced, Woolery explains, "There's no script. There's no beginning, there's no middle and there's no end. There's no plot. So when do you have enough? Never. It's the job that never ends."

== Production ==
The series was green-lit on December 1, 2002, under the preliminary title Chuck Woolery: Behind the Lingo. Game Show Network chief executive Rich Cronin explained, "We felt our fans loved Chuck, and if we did a reality show (about him), we'd have something that appealed to our current audience and bring in new viewers." Cronin added that it was important for the network to air original programming beyond game shows themselves: "We may get fans for this show who love reality series or love Chuck Woolery, but either way, it's important for us to break out of just doing studio-based game shows." The series was GSN's first attempt at producing a reality or documentary series. Over 400 hours of footage were recorded for the show.

Woolery was at first hesitant at being the show's subject. "I really wasn't in favor of it because I was looking at the Osbournes and Anna Nicole Smith, and I don't have a life like these people at all. I personally think watching me is kind of like having lunch with Pat Boone. It doesn't exactly rivet you to your chair." He later told the producers, "Maybe it will work if you edit it together and make it funny."

The series premiered on June 15, 2003, airing six episodes.

== Episodes ==
| No. | Title | Original release date | Production code |
|---|---|---|---|
| 1 | "Behind the Chuck" | June 15, 2003 | 01-001 |
Chuck's early life and career are summarized; his wife and kids are also introduced to the viewers.
| 2 | "A Tale of Two Chucks" | June 22, 2003 | 01-002 |
Chuck's desire to spend more time with his family is made difficult due to his hectic schedule with Lingo.
| 3 | "Reinventing the Cheese Wheel" | June 29, 2003 | 01-003 |
Chuck travels to a discount store in search of his favorite cottage cheese.
| 4 | "The Road to QVC" | July 6, 2003 | 01-004 |
Chuck sells a bass fishing lure product on QVC.
| 5 | "Chuck and the Common Man" | July 13, 2003 | 01-005 |
Chuck's relationships with his Lingo co-workers are detailed.
| 6 | "The Reality Behind Reality" | July 27, 2003 | 01-006 |
Chuck's issues with his marriage are brought to attention.

== Reception ==
PopMatters' Cary O'Dell opined, "This too-much-Chuck is a problem. Without a built-in curiosity factor...Chuck Woolery: Naturally Stoned is left with Woolery mugging for the camera or behind the scenes hijinks at Lingo. Neither is interesting enough to fill 30 minutes of TV." In his book Television Game Show Hosts: Biographies of 32 Stars, David Baber noted that "taping the reality series put tremendous pressure on Woolery's already troubled marriage." Woolery separated from his then-wife Teri Nelson while the series was airing. When previewing Carnie Wilson: Unstapled (a similar series that aired on GSN in 2010), CNN's James Dinan recalled the network's lack of success with reality television in the past, writing, "Anyone remember the horse racing-themed American Dream Derby or the Chuck Woolery-centric Naturally Stoned? Neither lasted long."
