= JD Roberto =

American game show host

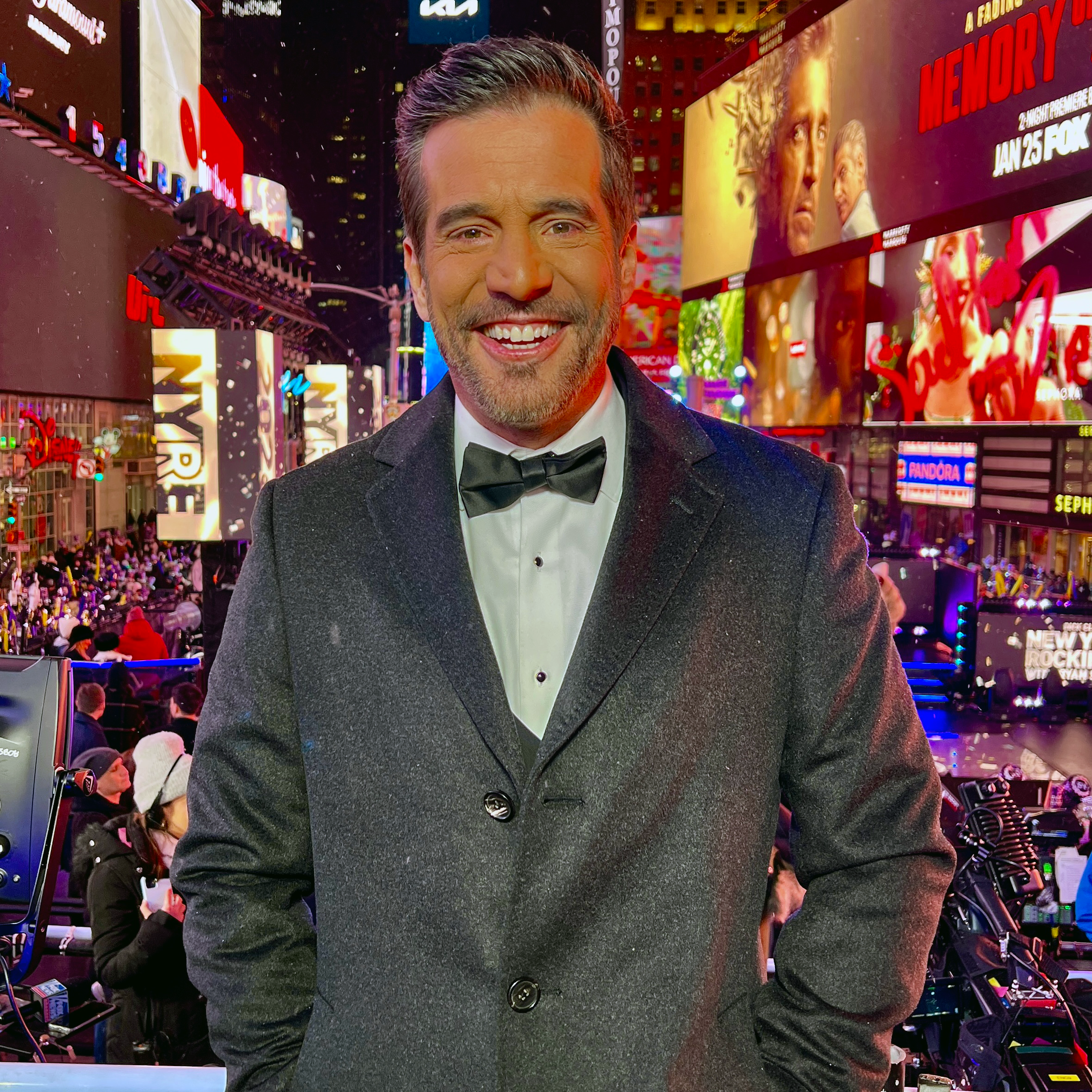
- Roberto at the ball drop in Times Square on December 31, 2025
- Born: October 23, 1969 (age 56); New York, U.S.
- Education: NYU's Tisch School of the Arts (Bachelor of Fine Arts degree in Acting), University of British Columbia (Master of Fine Arts degree in Writing for Stage and Screen)
- Occupations: Television personality, writer, host, producer
- Known for: Hosting Battle of the Ages, Daily Burn 365, Better, How to Get the Guy, Are You Hot?, Outback Jack, The Alaskan Adventure Challenge, Shark Chasers, American Idol Extra, The Search for the Next Elvira, Reality Remix, Shop 'til You Drop, You Lie Like a Dog, Food Fight, Cut to the Chase, Flamingo Fortune, The Price Is Right Live!, The Pyramid
- Awards: Two-time Emmy nominated, SAG Award Nominated
- Website: https://www.jdroberto.com

John David "JD" Roberto is an American television personality, writer, host, and producer.

== Biography ==
Born in White Plains, New York, Roberto went to the NYU's Tisch School of the Arts where he graduated with a Bachelor of Fine Arts degree in acting. He also attended the University of British Columbia, earning a Master of Fine Arts degree in Writing for Stage and Screen.

=== Television show hosting ===
JD is currently in his 8th year as on-air talent for Amazon Live, streaming to hundreds of millions of Amazon shoppers with reviews of the latest tech and deals. For the past two years, JD has helped people all over the USA ring in the new year from Times Square as the NYC host of the nationally syndicated Coast 2 Coast Countdown. Roberto also appears as a regular guest co-host and field correspondent for New York Living, a live morning news and lifestyle program on WPIX in NYC. Roberto also serves as the Supervising Producer for branded content at PIX11.

Roberto hosted of Battle of the Ages, a family-oriented game show airing on BYUtv. He also served as the Executive Producer, writer, and host of Daily Burn 365, a live, daily fitness program, being nominated for a Daytime Emmy Award. Prior to DB365, Roberto was the host of Better, a syndicated morning talk show for which he was nominated for a Daytime Emmy Award as host of the show.

Roberto hosted the prime-time reality TV shows How to Get the Guy and Are You Hot? (ABC), the relationship show Outback Jack (TBS), The Alaskan Adventure Challenge (Discovery Channel), the adventure travel show Shark Chasers (Travel Channel) American Idol Extra, the finale of The Search for the Next Elvira and Reality Remix (Fox Reality Channel). He has also been a recurring guest host of E! News Live.

Roberto's game show hosting credits include two seasons of Shop 'til You Drop from 2003 to 2005 (succeeding Pat Finn), You Lie Like a Dog, (Animal Planet), Food Fight (Food Network), Cut to the Chase (TBS) and the Florida State Lottery game show, Flamingo Fortune.

Roberto is one of the hosts of The Price Is Right Live!, a live version of the long-running TV game show presented at the Bally's Casino in Las Vegas. He was a guest announcer on the actual show itself for its 39th season, which premiered September 20, 2010, shortly after previous announcer Rich Fields left the show (who was eventually replaced by George Gray). Roberto is also the announcer of Game Show Network's The Pyramid.

=== Acting ===
As an actor, Roberto has appeared on All My Children (ABC), Passions (NBC), General Hospital (ABC), The New Adventures of Robin Hood (NBC) and the sitcoms Frasier(NBC), Family Matters (ABC) and Step by Step, (ABC). Film appearances include 'Til Night, Strippers, the short film Moment of Silence and Nautilus with Richard Norton.

Stage credits in New York and Los Angeles include performances at Theatre for the New City, Soho Rep, PS 122 and the title role in of Steve Martin's Picasso at the Lapin Agile at the Laguna Playhouse.

=== Stunt performances ===
Roberto was a stunt performer in such feature films as Flicka, Charlie's Angels, The Green Hornet, Galaxy Quest, The Mask of Zorro The Amazing Spider-Man, The Amazing Spider-Man 2 and in the web series The Bannen Way.

Roberto received a SAG Award nomination for Best Stunt Ensemble as part of the stunt team on The Amazing Spider-Man.

=== Writer ===
Roberto is the author of The Hands on Dad blog and has written for The Huffington Post, The Bump, Parents Magazine, and LA Parent Magazine. His travel writing has been featured on the World Hum. Roberto has been a contributing writer to the Los Angeles Times in the field of love and relationships. His writing has also appeared on the Imperfect Parent web site. In 2011, Roberto's screenplay Heavy Water was named a Top 10 Finalist in the American Zoetrope Screenwriting Competition.
