= You Lie Like a Dog =

- Genre: Game show Family
- Created by: John Kalish; Judy Meyers
- Based on: To Tell the Truth by Bob Stewart
- Directed by: Bob Loudin
- Presented by: JD Roberto
- Starring: Steve Marmel
- Narrated by: Carlos Alazraqui
- Composer: Daniel Stein
- Country of origin: United States
- Original language: English
- No. of seasons: 2

Production
- Executive producers: John Kalish; Judy Meyers
- Producers: Amy Di Dominico; Debbie Mitchell
- Running time: 30 minutes
- Production company: J Walking Productions

Original release
- Network: Animal Planet
- Release: January 31 – December 1, 2000

Related
- To Tell the Truth

You Lie Like a Dog is a family game show which aired on Animal Planet for two season in 2000. It is a variation of To Tell The Truth with a canine theme, in which a panel of three celebrities have to decide who among the contestants is the real owner of the featured pet.

== Premise ==
Round one introduces three people who all claim to own the same pet. It's up to the panel to determine who's "lying like a dog" by quizzing them about their day-to-day life with their pet. Locating the true owner will earn the panelist 10 points.

In Round two, two "pet professionals" try to convince the panel that they are the true experts. The celebrity panelists know that only one is real and can ask questions, request demonstrations and look anything else that will help them ferret out the fake. Similar to round one, a correct guess in this round earns the panelist 25 points.

In the final round, each celebrity panelist is teamed up with one of the liars. If a panelist can get a liar to say an animal-related phrase in thirty seconds, then the panelist receives 50 points while the liar received $200.
