= American Idol Extra =

- Directed by: Keith Hobelman; Terry Donohue
- Presented by: Ty Treadway (2006); Mikalah Gordon (2006–2007); Matt Rogers (2006–2007); JD Roberto (2007–2008); Gina Glocksen (2008); Constantine Maroulis (2008); Jillian Reynolds (2009); Ace Young (2009)
- Opening theme: American Idol Theme
- Ending theme: A song sung by that week's eliminated contestant.
- Country of origin: United States
- Original language: English
- No. of seasons: 4
- No. of episodes: 42

Production
- Executive producers: Dug James; Cindy Clark; Bob Boden
- Running time: 60 minutes
- Production companies: 19 Entertainment; FremantleMedia

Original release
- Network: Fox Reality Channel
- Release: March 15, 2006 – May 21, 2009

American Idol Extra is a television show that was shown on the Fox Reality Channel and Star! and billed as a show that would reveal "the backstage drama of what really happens" on American Idol. The program featured the first full-length interview with the most recent eliminated contestant and various behind-the-scenes material.

It was hosted by Jillian Reynolds and co-hosted by Ace Young, a former contestant of the show. Jillian interviewed each week's eliminated contestant as well as Idol contestants from years past. The show included exclusive behind the scenes packages from the Idol show as well as live, in studio, performances by former Idols. Judges Simon Cowell, Randy Jackson, Paula Abdul and Kara DioGuardi were periodically interviewed after the results show tapings.

The show premiered in 2006 and was shown on both Fox Reality Channel and The 101 Network (the DirecTV owned and exclusive programming service). Ty Treadway was the host that season and Mikalah Gordon and Matthew Rogers served as cohosts.

The second season (2007) brought some changes. JD Roberto became the host and the show became exclusive to Fox Reality Channel. In addition, the show is now taped on a stage of CBS Television City adjacent to the Idol studio in front of a live studio audience (the stage was also used for The Price is Right).

In season 3 (2008), Gina Glocksen and Constantine Maroulis replaced Gordon and Rogers as the co-hosts of the show.

In season 4 (2009), Jillian Reynolds replaced Roberto as host and Ace Young replaced Glocksen and Maroulis as co-host.

The program did not return in 2010 because Fox Reality was in transition to National Geographic Wild. The exit interview moved to The Ellen DeGeneres Show, hosted by DeGeneres, who was a judge that season. DeGeneres has since left the show and the first exit interview is now conducted on Live with Regis and Kelly. No other elements of this program have survived.

== Show rundown ==
Weekly segments include interviews with audience members who watched the performance show, interviews with past Idol contestants, a trivia contest, and a viewer question submitted by text messages from AT&T (formerly Cingular) subscribers.

== Season 1 ==
=== Episode 1 ===
- Airdate: March 21, 2006
- Eliminated Contestant: Melissa McGhee
- Other features:
  - Previous contestants Nikki McKibbin and Anthony Fedorov ask trivia questions.
  - Season 1 runner-up Justin Guarini talks about his new album.
  - Season 4 runner up Bo Bice shows viewers the making of his music video for "The Real Thing".
  - Mikalah catches everyone up on the careers of Amy Adams, George Huff and Kimberley Locke.
  - Some of the top 12 talk about what they do to warm up before their performance.
- Ending Theme: "Lately"

=== Episode 2 ===
- Airdate: March 22, 2006
- Eliminated Contestant: Kevin Covais
- Other features:
  - Ty interviews the guest coach for the week, Barry Manilow, and later Jasmine Trias, about their opinions on the performances.
  - Footage of season 4 winner Carrie Underwood after she went backstage to talk to the top 16.
  - Mikalah talks to wardrobe supervisor Miles Siggins about what each of the top 11 were wearing for the performance show.
- Ending Theme: "When I Fall in Love"

=== Episode 3 ===
- Airdate: March 29, 2006
- Eliminated Contestant: Lisa Tucker
- Other Features:
  - Season 3 runner-up Diana DeGarmo shows some of her childhood performances and talks about how she got a part in the Broadway musical Hairspray.
  - Mikalah talks to music director Ricky Minor.
  - Matt gives season 3 top 5 finalist George Huff some prized mementos, as he lost most of his possessions in Hurricane Katrina.
  - The top 10 talk about the first concert they went to.
- Ending Theme: "Because of You"

=== Episode 4 ===
- Airdate: April 5, 2006
- Eliminated Contestant: Mandisa
- Other Features:
  - Ty talks to guest coach Kenny Rogers
  - The final 8 talk about what country means to them, and also how they would sum up Mandisa.
  - Mikalah talks to hairstylist Teena Allen, makeup artist Mezghan Hussainy, and Patricia Clark of craft services.
  - Garet Johnson, the Wyoming cowboy eliminated in the Hollywood rounds, travels to New York City, gets to see Frenchie Davis in Rent, and meets with students at LaGuardia Performing Arts High School.
- Ending Theme: "Any Man of Mine"

=== Episode 5 ===
- Airdate: April 12, 2006
- Eliminated Contestant: Bucky Covington
- Other Features:
  - Season 1 top 3 finalist Nikki McKibbin previews her new video and single.
  - Mikalah talks to hairstylist Dean Banowetz and makeup artist Mezhgan Hussainy about their styling of the top 8.
  - A look at Kevin Covais after his return home.
  - The top 7 are asked to describe Simon Cowell, what they think about when they sing a love song, and how they would describe Bucky Covington.
- Ending Theme: "Fat Bottomed Girls"

=== Episode 6 ===
- Airdate: April 19, 2006
- Eliminated Contestant: Ace Young
- Other Features:
  - The top 6 are asked to give their first thoughts on Rod Stewart, asked what they were doing a year ago, what 3 words they would use to describe Randy Jackson, and how they would describe Ace.
  - Ty interviews executive producer Nigel Lythgoe.
  - Mikalah talks to director Bruce Gowers.
  - Season 2 semifinalist Jennifer Fuentes shows viewers around her job as the lead presenter at the Ringing Brothers, Barnum & Bailey circus.
- Ending Theme: "That's All"

=== Episode 7 ===
- Airdate: April 26, 2006
- Eliminated Conetstant: Kellie Pickler
- Other Features:
  - Behind the scenes footage of the top 6 Ford commercial.
  - Ty interviews guest coaches Andrea Bocelli and David Foster.
  - The top 6 are asked what title they'd use if they had to write a love song about their life. The top 5 are asked 3 words to describe their time on American Idol, and for their opinion on Kellie.
  - Mikalah talks to stage manager Debbie Williams.
  - Ty interviews Paula Abdul.
- Ending Theme: "Unchained Melody"

=== Episode 8 ===
- Airdate: May 3, 2006
- Eliminated Contestant: Paris Bennett
- Other Features:
  - The top 4 talk about the worst birthday present they could ever get, a CD people would be surprised they own, and their thoughts on Paris.
  - Season 2 top 6 finalist Carmen Rasmusen talks about her struggles to get a record deal and her first album.
  - Mikalah talks to wardrobe stylist Miles Siggins about the clothes worn for the top 5 performance show.
  - Ty talks to season 1 runner-up Justin Guarini and season 5 top 10 finalist Lisa Tucker, and Lisa returns to the children's theater where she got her start.
- Ending Theme: "Be Without You"

=== Episode 9 ===
- Airdate: May 10, 2006
- Eliminated Contestant: Chris Daughtry
- Chris Daughtry announced that he had been offered 5 record deals in 30 minutes.
- Ending Theme: "Suspicious Minds"

=== Episode 10 ===
- Airdate: May 17, 2006
- Eliminated Contestant: Elliott Yamin
- Other Features:
  - Kellie returns to her hometown to big fanfare.
  - Mikalah does a recap of all the backstage crew she has talked to over the season.
  - Ty talks to Nigel Lythgoe.
  - The making of the top 3 Ford commercial.
  - The top 3 talk about how they've changed since they started American Idol, and various contestants talk about their feelings for Elliott.
- Ending Theme: "I Believe to My Soul"

=== Episode 11 ===
- Airdate: May 24, 2006
- Winner and Runner Up: Taylor Hicks and Katharine McPhee

== Season 2 ==
=== Episode 12 ===
- Airdate: March 15, 2007
- Eliminated Contestant: Brandon Rogers
- Other Features:
  - Season 5 Top 10 finalist Lisa Tucker performs.
  - The show looks back on Carrie Underwood and her visit with the top 12 of this year.
  - Brandon talks about his elimination and his plans for the future.
  - His final performance is seen in its entirety at the episode's end. It had not been shown on the original Fox broadcast due to time constraints.
- Ending Theme: "You Can't Hurry Love"

=== Episode 13 ===
- Airdate: March 22, 2007
- Eliminated Contestant: Stephanie Edwards
- Other Features:
  - Paris Bennett, a Top 5 finalist from last season, visits the Idol Extra stage and performs.
  - A look back on Taylor Hicks and his successes after Idol.
  - Edwards' family stops by
  - Edwards' final performance is shown completely; as with Rogers' the previous week, it had not been shown on the Fox broadcast as time had expired.
  - The top 10 give their thoughts on how Stephanie will succeed in the future.
- Eliminated: "You Don't Have to Say You Love Me"

=== Episode 14 ===
- Airdate: March 29, 2007
- Eliminated Contestant: Chris Sligh
- Ending Theme: "Every Little Thing She Does Is Magic"

=== Episode 15 ===
- Airdate: April 5, 2007
- Eliminated Contestant: Gina Glocksen
- Ending Theme: "Smile"

=== Episode 16 ===
- Airdate: April 12, 2007
- Eliminated Contestant: Haley Scarnato
- Other Features:
  - Mandisa performs "True Beauty" and talks about her new book and her career after American Idol.
- Ending Theme: "Turn the Beat Around"

=== Episode 17 ===
- Airdate: April 19, 2007
- Eliminated Contestant: Sanjaya Malakar
- Ending Theme: "Something to Talk About"

=== Episode 18 ===
- Airdate: April 26, 2007
- Eliminated Contestant: None
- Note: All six of the remaining contestants were interviewed at separate points in the broadcast: Melinda Doolittle and Jordin Sparks, Blake Lewis and Chris Richardson, Phil Stacey and LaKisha Jones.

=== Episode 19 ===
- Airdate: May 3, 2007
- Eliminated Contestants: Phil Stacey, Chris Richardson
- Other features:
  - Ace Young (season 5) performed a song from his new album
  - Haley Scarnato's return to her hometown of San Antonio, Texas is chronicled
- Ending Theme: "Blaze of Glory" and "Wanted Dead or Alive"

=== Episode 20 ===
- Airdate: May 10, 2007
- Eliminated Contestant: LaKisha Jones
- Ending Theme: "Stayin' Alive"

=== Episode 21 ===
- Airdate: May 17, 2007
- Eliminated Contestant: Melinda Doolittle
- Ending Theme: "I'm a Woman"

=== Episode 22 ===
- Airdate: May 24, 2007
- Winner and Runner Up: Jordin Sparks and Blake Lewis

== Season 3 ==
=== Episode 23 ===
- Airdate: March 13, 2008
- Eliminated Contestant: David Hernandez
- Other Features:
  - Melinda Doolittle performed
  - Sanjaya Malakar made a special appearance and had an interview.
- Ending Theme: "I Saw Her Standing There"

=== Episode 24 ===
- Airdate: March 20, 2008
- Eliminated Contestant: Amanda Overmyer
- Other Features:
  - Chris Richardson performed
  - Gina Glocksen had an exclusive one-on-one interview with Kellie Pickler.
- Ending Theme: "Back in the U.S.S.R."

=== Episode 25 ===
- Airdate: March 27, 2008
- Eliminated Contestant: Chikezie
- Other Features:
  - Ruben Studdard performs single from his new album.
  - Haley Scarnato performed, and did an in-depth interview about life after Idol.
- Ending Theme: "If Only for One Night"

=== Episode 26 ===
- Airdate: April 3, 2008
- Eliminated Contestant: Ramiele Malubay
- Other Features:
  - Ace Young performs single from his new album.
- Ending Theme: "Did I Ever Cross Your Mind"

=== Episode 27 ===
- Airdate: April 10, 2008
- Eliminated Contestant: Michael Johns
- Other Features:
  - Blake Lewis performs single from his new album.
- Ending Theme: "Dream On"

=== Episode 28 ===
- Airdate: April 17, 2008
- Eliminated Contestant: Kristy Lee Cook
- Other Features:
  - Kristy Lee Cook stated her song choice for Andrew Lloyd Webber week had she not been eliminated had already been selected and would have been "Don't Cry for Me, Argentina" from Evita
  - Kristy announced she is engaged to boyfriend
  - Bo Bice performs single "I'm Gone" from his new album.
- Ending Theme: "Forever"

=== Episode 29 ===
- Airdate: April 24, 2008
- Eliminated Contestant: Carly Smithson
- Other Features:
  - Michael Johns made a special surprise for Carly Smithson. He also interviewed about his thoughts from the judges, his previous appearances, his upcoming appearance for the White House Correspondents' Dinner, and his song choices that he should have sung after he got eliminated.
  - Constantine Maroulis had an exclusive one-on-one interview with Jordin Sparks.
  - Gina Glocksen performs single from her new album.
- Ending Theme: "Jesus Christ Superstar"

=== Episode 30 ===
- Airdate: May 1, 2008
- Eliminated Contestant: Brooke White
- Other Features:
  - Like Michael Johns, Kristy Lee Cook made a special surprise for Brooke White. She also interviewed about her previous appearances, and her song choices that she should have sung after she got eliminated.
  - JD Roberto had an exclusive interview with Paula Abdul about the controversy between her and Jason Castro after the first performance.
- Ending Theme: "I Am...I Said"

=== Episode 31 ===
- Airdate: May 8, 2008
- Eliminated Contestant: Jason Castro
- Other Features:
  - Judges; Paula Abdul, Randy Jackson and Simon Cowell make a guest appearance on the show and they comfort Jason. Plus the remaining 3 finalists; David Cook, Syesha Mercado and David Archuleta via video only.
  - JD Roberto interviews Castro's mother and brother.
  - Today's show also goes through several past great performances that Jason Castro had sung. Among them; Hallelujah and Over the Rainbow.
  - LaKisha Jones performs her Gospel single.
- Ending Theme: "Mr. Tambourine Man"

=== Episode 32 ===
- Airdate: May 15, 2008
- Eliminated Contestant: Syesha Mercado
- Other Features:
  - The 10 eliminated finalists were congratulated to David Archuleta and David Cook for being the Final 2, and JD Roberto finally interviewed Syesha Mercado as the last eliminated finalist on the show.
  - Sanjaya Malakar and Diana DeGarmo performed.
- Ending Theme: "Fever"

=== Episode 33 ===
- Airdate: May 22, 2008
- Winner and Runner-Up: David Cook and David Archuleta
- Other Features:
  - JD Roberto had last interviews with the eliminated Top 12 Finalists about their finale performances and feedbacks for the Final 2. He also had an exclusive one-on-one interview separately with David Archuleta and David Cook.

== Season 4 ==
=== Episode 34 ===
- Airdate: March 26, 2009
- Eliminated Contestant: Michael Sarver
- Ending Theme: "Ain't Too Proud to Beg"

=== Episode 35 ===
- Airdate: April 2, 2009
- Eliminated Contestant: Megan Joy
- Ending Theme: "Turn Your Lights Down Low"

=== Episode 36 ===
- Airdate: April 9, 2009
- Eliminated Contestant: Scott MacIntyre
- Ending Theme: "The Search Is Over"

=== Episode 37 ===
- Airdate: April 16, 2009
- Eliminated Contestant: None
- Note: All seven contestants were interviewed

=== Episode 38 ===
- Airdate: April 23, 2009
- Eliminated Contestants: Lil Rounds and Anoop Desai
- Ending Theme: "I'm Every Woman" and "Dim All the Lights"

=== Episode 39 ===
- Airdate: April 30. 2009
- Eliminated Contestant: Matt Giraud
- Ending Theme: "My Funny Valentine"

=== Episode 40 ===
- Airdate: May 7, 2009
- Eliminated Contestant: Allison Iraheta
- Ending Theme: "Cry Baby"

=== Episode 41 ===
- Airdate: May 14, 2009
- Eliminated Contestant: Danny Gokey
- Ending Theme: "You Are So Beautiful"

=== Episode 42 ===
- Airdate: May 21, 2009
- Winner and Runner Up: Kris Allen and Adam Lambert
