= Chuck Woolery =

American game show host (1941–2024)

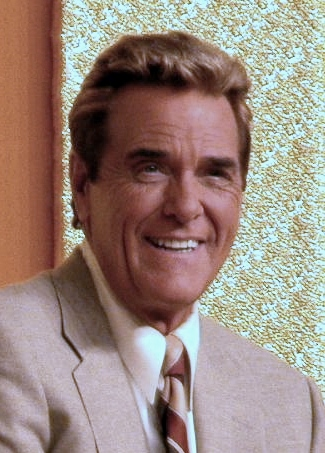
- Woolery in 2004
- Born: Charles Herbert Woolery; March 16, 1941; Ashland, Kentucky, U.S.
- Died: November 23, 2024 (aged 83); Horseshoe Bay, Texas, U.S.
- Occupations: Television host; singer; actor
- Years active: 1963–2024
- Notable credits: Wheel of Fortune (1975–1981); Scrabble (1984–1990, 1993); Love Connection (1983–1994)
- Political party: Republican
- Spouses: Margaret Hayes (m. 1961; div. 1971); Jo Ann Pflug (m. 1972; div. 1980); Teri Nelson (m. 1985; div. 2004); Kim Barnes (m. 2006; div. 2016)
- Children: 5
- Relatives: David Nelson (former-father-in-law)
- Musical career
- Genres: Psychedelic pop; country
- Instruments: Vocals; guitar
- Labels: Columbia; Warner; Epic
- Formerly of: The Avant-Garde

Charles Herbert Woolery (March 16, 1941 – November 23, 2024) was an American television host, actor, and musician. He had long-running tenures hosting several game shows. Woolery was the original host of the original daytime Wheel of Fortune from 1975 until 1981, when he was replaced by Pat Sajak.

After leaving Wheel of Fortune, Woolery hosted a number of other game shows including Love Connection (1983–1994), Scrabble (1984–1990, 1993), Greed (1999–2000), and Lingo (2002–2007). Woolery's musical career includes several advertising jingles, a top-40 pop hit with the psychedelic pop duo The Avant-Garde, and a number of country music releases. In the 2010s, Woolery also hosted a political podcasting series.

== Early life ==
Charles Herbert Woolery was born in Ashland, Kentucky, on March 16, 1941, the son of Katherine, a homemaker, and Dan Woolery, who owned a fountain supplies company.

Woolery attended University of Kentucky for two years prior to joining the Navy. Woolery served two years in the U.S. Navy, aboard the USS Enterprise (CVN-65). After his Navy service he attended Morehead State University.

In 1963, Woolery worked as a wine consultant for Wasserstrom Wine and Import Company in Columbus, Ohio.

== Career ==
=== Music career ===
In the early 1960s, Woolery sang and played the double bass with a folk song trio called The Bordermen. He also sang in a duo called The Avant-Garde who were in the psychedelic pop genre. The other half of the duo was Bubba Fowler. They signed to Columbia Records and had a Top 40 hit with "Naturally Stoned" in 1968, bringing the duo one-hit wonder status. It reached #30 in Canada, October 21, 1968.

In the late 1970s, Woolery returned to his singing career. Woolery charted on Hot Country Songs with "Painted Lady" and "The Greatest Love Affair". Between 1977 and 1980, Woolery recorded for Warner Bros. Records and Epic Records as a solo artist, with two low-charting singles on Hot Country Songs. Woolery also co-wrote "The Joys of Being a Woman" on Tammy Wynette's 1971 album We Sure Can Love Each Other.

=== Acting and television show host ===
As an actor, Woolery appeared with Stephen Boyd, Rosey Grier, and Cheryl Ladd in the mid-1970s film The Treasure of Jamaica Reef.

Woolery performed as Mr. Dingle on the children's television series New Zoo Revue in the early 1970s. During that time, he made his first game show appearance on an episode of Tattletales in 1974, alongside then-wife Jo Ann Pflug. Starting as a singer, Woolery appeared on an episode of Your Hit Parade. On January 6, 1975, he began hosting Wheel of Fortune at the suggestion of creator Merv Griffin, who had seen Woolery sing on The Tonight Show.

Woolery hosted the show for six years. In 1978, he was nominated for a Daytime Emmy Award for Outstanding Host or Hostess in a Game or Audience Participation Show. In 1981, he was involved in a salary dispute with the program's producers. He said in a 2007 interview that he demanded a raise from $65,000 a year to about $500,000 a year because the program was drawing a 44 viewership share at the time, and other hosts, such as Richard Dawson and Bob Barker, were making that much.

Griffin offered Woolery $400,000 a year, and NBC offered to pay the additional $100,000, but after Griffin threatened to move the program to CBS, NBC withdrew the offer. Woolery's contract was not renewed. His final episode aired on December 25, 1981. Pat Sajak replaced him.

Woolery hosted Love Connection (1983–1994), The Big Spin (1985), Scrabble (1984–1990, 1993), Home & Family (1996–1998, co-host), The Dating Game (1997–1999), Greed (1999–2000), TV Land Ultimate Fan Search (1999–2000), and Lingo (2002–2007). He was the subject of a short-lived reality television, Chuck Woolery: Naturally Stoned (originally titled Chuck Woolery: Behind the Lingo) in 2003.

In 1991, he hosted his own talk show, The Chuck Woolery Show, which lasted for only a few months. He hosted The Price Is Right Live! at Harrah's Entertainment casinos, and appeared in the live stage show "$250,000 Game Show Spectacular" at the Westgate Las Vegas until April 2008.

On April 21, 2023, it was announced that Woolery would be featured in an upcoming four-episode documentary by ABC News titled The Game Show Show, covering the history of game shows in America over the last eight decades. The four-part documentary premiered on May 10, 2023. Woolery later hosted '80s Quiz Show, a game show based on trends and norms of the 1980s, which streamed on Fox Nation on June 7, 2024.

=== Radio and podcast host ===
From 2012 to 2014, Woolery hosted a nationally syndicated radio commentary show, Save Us Chuck Woolery, which grew out of his YouTube videos. In 2014, the show became a long-format podcast, and was retitled Blunt Force Truth. Before his death the show could still be heard on about 60 radio stations across the country. With co-host Mark Young, Woolery expanded on his conservative political ideals and current events, often inviting guest experts to join the conversation.

== Political views ==
Woolery spoke in favor of American conservatism. He was an active supporter of the Republican Party, and had mainly donated to Republican and conservative causes. He was a gun rights activist.

Woolery was accused of antisemitism after a series of tweets in May 2017, including this message: "Believe it or not. Karl Marx and Vladimir Lenin were both Jewish. I was shocked to find, most of the original Soviet Communists were Jewish." The claim that communism is Jewish in origin forms the core of the antisemitic trope called Judeo-Bolshevism. The tweet led to accusations of antisemitism against Woolery. In response to the criticism, Woolery tweeted: "Amazing to me, I point out that Marx and Lenin were Jewish, Fact of history, and now I'm being called anti-Semitic? Why do people do this?"

On July 12, 2020, Woolery tweeted that the Centers for Disease Control and Prevention (CDC), doctors, the media, and the Democratic Party were lying about the COVID-19 pandemic. President Donald Trump retweeted Woolery's claims. The following day, Woolery tweeted that his son had tested positive for the virus and that the "COVID-19 pandemic is real". His Twitter account was later made private before later being made public again.

== Personal life and death ==
Woolery was a Christian who volunteered in ministry. He was married five times and was the father of five children. Woolery and his first wife, Margaret Hays, had two children together, Katherine and Chad. Chad was killed in a motorcycle accident in January 1986.

In 1972, he married actress Jo Ann Pflug and had a daughter, Melissa. They divorced in 1980.

With third wife Teri Nelson, who is the adopted daughter of actor David Nelson and granddaughter of Ozzie and Harriet Nelson, he had two sons, Michael and Sean. In 2006, he married Kim Barnes. At the time of his death, it was reported that he was married to a woman named Kristen.

In Woolery's later years, he lived in Horseshoe Bay, Texas, and died at home on November 23, 2024, at the age of 83.

== Filmography ==
=== Acting ===
Year	Title	Role	Notes
1972	New Zoo Revue	Mr. Dingle	
1973	Love, American Style	Mr. Thompson	1 episode, segment: "Love and the Cozy Comrades"
1973	ABC Saturday Morning Cartoons	Superman	For full preview special Sneak Peek
1974	Sonic Boom	Pilot Rogers	Short film
1975	The Treasure of Jamaica Reef	Detective	a.k.a. Evil in the Deep
1978	A Guide for the Married Woman	Tennis Pro	Television film
1979	$weepstake$	Tyler	Episode 4
1982	Romance Theatre		"Marisol" Parts 1–5
1982	Six Pack	TV Commentator #2	
1989	227	Himself	Episode: "A Date to Remember"
1989	Cold Feet	Himself	Love Connection host on TV
1997	Hey, Hey, It's the Monkees	Chuck	Cameo as the nightclub owner
2004	Scrubs	Himself	Season 4 Episode 6

=== Television/radio ===
Year	Title	Notes
1975–1981	Wheel of Fortune	Replaced by Pat Sajak
1983–1994	Love Connection	Host
1984–1990, 1993	Scrabble	Host
1991	The Chuck Woolery Show	65 episodes
1996	Home & Family	Co-host with Cristina Ferrare
1997–1999	The Dating Game	Host
1999–2000	Greed	Host, 44 episodes
1999–2000	TV Land Ultimate Fan Search	
1999	Biography	Episode: Bob Barker: Master of Ceremonies
2002–2007	Lingo	succeeded by Bill Engvall in 2011
2008	Think Like a Cat	Host
2012–2014	Save Us Chuck Woolery (radio show)	Host
2014–2024	Blunt Force Truth (podcast)	Co-host with Mark Young
2023	The Game Show Show	Game show documentary
2024	'80s Quiz Show	Host

== Discography ==
=== Singles ===
Year	Single	Peak positions
Year	Single	Hot Country Songs
1977	"Painted Lady"	78
1977	"Take 'Er Down, Boys"	—
1980	"The Greatest Love Affair"	94
"—" denotes releases that did not chart

== See also ==
- List of game show hosts
