= American Dream Derby =

- Genre: Reality
- Presented by: Steve Santagati
- Country of origin: United States
- Original language: English
- No. of seasons: 1
- No. of episodes: 8

Original release
- Network: GSN
- Release: January 10 – February 21, 2005

American Dream Derby is an American horse racing-themed reality show that aired on GSN. Eight one-hour episodes were produced, with the first two airing on January 10, 2005; the show then aired weekly through the February 21, 2005, finale. The series, hosted by Steve Santagati, featured twelve contestants competing for a grand prize of $250,000 and a stable of eight thoroughbred horses. Much of the horse racing in the series took place at Santa Anita Park.

The general episode format involved three segments. First, an "Owner's Challenge" took place; the winner of the challenge got to sleep that night in the show's mansion rather than in the stables with the horses; the winner also got to choose some of the other contestants to join them. Those who did not make it to the mansion then competed in a "Stable Hands' Challenge." The winners of each of the two challenges then got to choose one of their opponents (from their own sleeping arrangement) to face the "Guts Match". each chosen contestant then picked a horse from the stable to represent them in a heads-up match; the contestant who chose the losing horse was eliminated.

The penultimate episode saw the final six trimmed to three via three Guts Matches, then a fourth Guts Match was run to determine which of the final three contestants got first pick for the final race. The live finale saw the three finalists, plus the five eliminated contestants who had received the highest viewers' call-in votes, choosing from the eight horses for the final race that determined the champion.

The series' theme song was "You Take Me Home" by LeAnn Rimes, who appeared in the series finale.
