= Greed (game show) =

American television game show

- Genre: Game show
- Created by: Dick Clark; Bob Boden
- Written by: Eric Peterkofsky; Joseph Kaufmann III; Hilary Schacter; Mandel Ilagan; Bob Boden; Jeffrey Mirkin
- Directed by: Bob Levy; Chris Donovan
- Presented by: Chuck Woolery
- Announcer: Mark Thompson
- Composer: Edgar Struble
- Country of origin: United States
- Original language: English
- No. of seasons: 1
- No. of episodes: 44

Production
- Executive producers: Dick Clark; Bob Boden
- Production location: Los Angeles
- Editor: Floyd Ingram
- Running time: 42–44 minutes
- Production company: Dick Clark Productions

Original release
- Network: Fox
- Release: November 4, 1999 – July 14, 2000

Greed (Note: The show's full title was Greed: The Series as reflected in its title card and occasionally in print media.) is an American television game show that aired on Fox for one season. Chuck Woolery was the show's host while Mark Thompson was its announcer. The series format consisted of a team of contestants who answered a set of up to eight multiple-choice questions (the first set of four containing one right answer and the second set of four containing four right answers) for a potential prize of up to $2,000,000 (Note: The top prize was temporarily raised during the first several episodes to as high as $2,550,000 as part of a progressive jackpot.) (equivalent to $3,865,000 in 2025).

Dick Clark and Bob Boden of Dick Clark Productions created the series in response to the success of ABC's Who Wants to Be a Millionaire. Production was rushed in an effort to launch the show before Millionaire's new season, and the show premiered less than two months after it was initially pitched. A pilot episode was omitted, and Fox aired its first episode of Greed on November 4, 1999.

While its Nielsen ratings were not as successful as those of Who Wants to Be a Millionaire, Greed still improved on Fox's performance year-to-year in its timeslots. The show's critical reception was mixed; some critics saw it as a rip-off of Who Wants to Be a Millionaire, while others believed Greed was the more intriguing and dramatic of the two programs. Its final episode aired July 14, 2000, and Greed was abruptly canceled following the conclusion of its first season as Fox's leadership shifted the network's focus to scripted programming. The top prize was never awarded; only one contestant advanced to the eighth and final question, failing to win the prize.

== Gameplay ==
=== Qualifying round ===
Six contestants are asked a question with a numerical answer. After all six submit a number, the answer is revealed and the contestant whose numerical guess is farthest from the exact answer is eliminated. The remaining contestants are stationed at podiums based upon the proximity of their guess to the correct answer, and the contestant who had the closest guess becomes the team's captain. If two or more contestants give the same guess or guesses that are of equal distance from the correct answer, the one who locks in their answer before the other(s) receives the higher ranking.

Starting with the Super Greed episodes (see below), the qualifying question was eliminated and only five contestants were introduced at the start of each new game, with positions already assigned.

=== Question round ===
The team attempts to answer a series of eight questions worth successively higher amounts, from $25,000 up to $2,000,000. Each of the first four questions has one correct answer to be chosen from several options (four for questions one and two, five for questions three and four). The host reads the question and possible answers to one contestant, who has unlimited time to select one of them. The captain can either accept that answer or replace it with a different one. If the final choice is correct, the team's winnings are increased to the value of that question; the captain can then choose to either quit the game or risk the money on the next question. If the captain quits after any of these four questions, the money is split evenly among all five team members. Giving or accepting a wrong answer ends the game and forfeits all winnings. The team member in the lowest position (farthest from the correct answer when a qualifying question was played) gives the answer to the first question, and each question after that is answered by the member in the next higher position.

The remaining four questions each have four correct answers to be chosen from several options, starting with six for question five and increasing by one for each question after that. Before asking a question, the host reveals its category to the captain and offers a chance to end the game, with the prize money being divided among the remaining players according to their shares. If the captain chooses to continue, a "Terminator" round is played prior to the question being asked. The captain is given a single "Freebie" lifeline prior to question five and can use it once to eliminate a wrong answer from a question.

For questions five through seven, answers are given one at a time by the remaining contestants with the captain answering last, then (if necessary) choosing to either give enough additional answers to make four or delegate the choices to other members. Once all the answers are in, the captain may either approve the choices as they stand or change one of them if desired. Answers are revealed individually as correct or incorrect; if three correct answers are found, the host offers a buyout to quit the game. Ten percent of the question value is offered on questions five and six ($20,000 and $50,000 respectively), to be split evenly among the remaining players, and the team's decision is entirely up to the captain. On question seven, each team member can choose to take an individual buyout consisting of a luxury automobile and $25,000 cash (approximately $100,000 total value). (Note: The total value referenced reflects the value at the time of the show's release in 1999.)

If the captain (at questions five and six) or at least one team member (at question seven) chooses to continue with the game, the fourth answer is revealed. If it is correct, the team splits the cash award for the question at that level. If an incorrect answer is revealed at any point, the game ends and the team leaves with nothing (any member of the team got to keep any terminator winnings won).

Payout structure
Question	Value	
Question	Greed	Super Greed
8	$2,000,000	$4,000,000
7	$1,000,000	$2,000,000
6	$500,000	$1,000,000
5	$200,000	
4	$100,000	
3	$75,000	
2	$50,000	
1	$25,000	

=== Terminator ===
A Terminator challenge is played before each question starting at question five. One contestant is chosen at random and given the option to challenge a teammate (including the team captain) to a one-question showdown for their share of the team's collective winnings. If the selected contestant issues a challenge, they are given a guaranteed $10,000 in cash to keep regardless of the outcome of the Terminator or the overall game. If the selected contestant does not wish to issue a challenge, the team remains as it was and the host proceeds to the next question.

The two contestants face each other across podiums at center stage, and the host reads a toss-up question with a single answer. The first contestant to buzz in and answer correctly eliminates the other contestant from the game and claims their share of the collective winnings. If a contestant buzzes in and provides an incorrect response or does not immediately respond, their opponent wins by default. If the team captain is eliminated, the contestant who wins the challenge becomes the new captain.

=== $2,000,000 question ===
Before the $2,000,000 question, each team member can decide to quit with their share of the team's collective winnings or continue playing. If any team members choose to continue, a question with nine possible answers is presented, of which four are correct. Contestants who reach this level are given 30 seconds to select four answers. If they fail to do so within the time limit, the game ends and they leave with nothing (but keeps all terminator winnings won up to that point). Following the selection of answers, correct responses are revealed individually. None of the answers can be changed and no buyout is offered following the reveal of the third correct answer. If all four chosen answers are correct, the contestant (or team) wins $2,000,000.

Only one contestant played the final question throughout the show's run. On the episode that aired on November 18, 1999, Daniel Avila chose to risk his $200,000 individual winnings to play for the top prize (which had been increased to $2,200,000 as it was during Greed's progressive jackpot shows). However, Avila missed the question based on a Yale University study about the four smells most recognizable to the human nose (peanut butter, coffee, Vicks VapoRub, and chocolate). Avila correctly guessed peanut butter, coffee, and Vicks VapoRub but incorrectly guessed tuna instead of chocolate, and left with nothing.

=== Rule changes ===
==== Top prize ====
For the first six episodes of Greed's run, aired November 4, 1999, until December 2, 1999, the top prize started at $2,000,000 and increased by $50,000 after every game in which it went unclaimed. As no team had reached the jackpot question and provided the necessary correct answers, the jackpot reached $2,550,000 in the first month. When the program was picked up as a regular series in Fox's weekly lineup, the top prize was changed to a flat $2,000,000.

==== Greed: Million Dollar Moment ====
In February 2000, eight previous Greed contestants were brought back for a "Million Dollar Moment" at the end of each of four episodes. The contestants were all players who had gotten close to the $2,000,000 jackpot question. Two contestants faced off with a Terminator-style sudden-death question, and the winner was given a $1,000,000 question with eight possible choices. The contestant had up to 30 seconds to study the question, then 10 seconds to lock in the four correct answers to win the money. Correct answers were revealed one at a time (as on the jackpot question, no buyout was offered after the third correct answer), and if all four were correct, the contestant won an additional $1,000,000.

Curtis Warren became Greed's only Million Dollar Moment winner when he successfully answered a question about movies based on television shows on the episode that aired on February 11, 2000. Warren was the program's biggest winner with $1,410,000 and briefly held the title of biggest U.S. game show winner in history; combined with an earlier six-figure winning streak on Sale of the Century in 1986 and an appearance on Win Ben Stein's Money, his total game show winnings stood at $1,546,988. Warren's record was broken shortly thereafter by David Legler, who won $1,765,000 on Twenty-One. He has since been surpassed by others, including Jeopardy! champions Ken Jennings, Brad Rutter, and James Holzhauer.

==== Super Greed ====
From April 28 to May 19, 2000, the show was known as Super Greed. The qualifying question was eliminated, and the values for the top three questions were doubled, making the eighth question worth a potential $4,000,000. The cash buyout on the sixth question ($1,000,000) was increased to $100,000, and any team that got this question right and continued past it was guaranteed to receive $200,000 (independent of any Terminator winnings) regardless of the outcome of the game. In addition, the value of the individual buyout on the seventh question ($2,000,000) was increased to $150,000, first by offering $75,000 cash in addition to the luxury automobile, then later by offering the entire amount in cash. During this period, Phyllis Harris served as captain of a team that answered seven questions correctly and shared a $2,000,000 prize, though she and her teammates elected to leave the game before attempting the final $4,000,000 question.

== Production ==
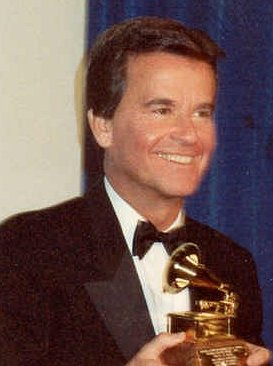
Television personality Dick Clark (pictured in 1990) co-created the series with Bob Boden and served as an executive producer.

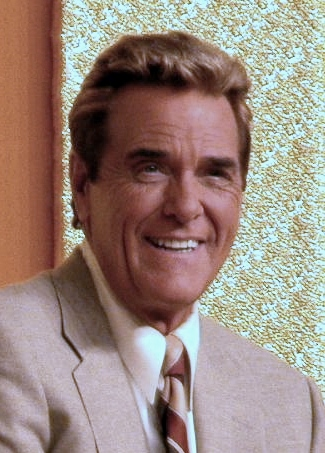
Chuck Woolery (pictured in 2004) hosted the series throughout its entire run.

Greed was created by Dick Clark and Bob Boden of Dick Clark Productions. An hour-long program, it was considered by television critics and network producers to be Fox's response to ABC's Who Wants to Be a Millionaire, while Fox executive Mike Darnell later confirmed that Fox was "inspired by the success of Millionaire." Boden had initially pitched a similar format that he called All for One to NBC, but the network passed on the idea as they already had a revival of Twenty-One in development. Clark, meanwhile, wanted a more "provocative" title; when Boden told Clark "the core of the show is greed," Clark responded, "Let's just call it Greed."

Clark and Boden pitched the show to Fox in September, and six episodes were ordered, which began taping less than three weeks later. The series was only given about a month of preparation before it was set to premiere in November 1999. Fox had set the target premiere date of November 4, because it was three days before Millionaire was set to return to ABC, and by mid-October, one Fox executive was concerned the network might not have the show ready in time.

Producers considered many potential hosts in the selection process, including veteran game show hosts Chuck Woolery and Bob Eubanks, as well as Keith Olbermann and Gordon Elliott. On October 13, 1999, The Philadelphia Inquirer's Gail Shister reported that Olbermann was close to being named host, while also noting Phil Donahue was Fox's first choice, though he proved to be too expensive for the network. Woolery was ultimately selected as the show's host due to his game show experience. The production team omitted taping a pilot, allowing the series to be ready in time for its premiere on November 4. Mark Thompson served as the announcer, Bob Levy and Chris Donovan directed the program, and Edgar Struble composed the soundtrack. It was initially subtitled "Greed: The Multi-Million Dollar Challenge". The tagline for the series was "the Richest, Most Dangerous Game in America." In January 2000, Fox brought Greed back to its schedule by airing it three nights in a row before it began airing weekly on Fridays, in order to avoid competing head-to-head with Millionaire on Thursdays.

The majority of Greed's contestants during its first couple of months were hand-picked and recruited by the show's producers after a multiple-choice qualification test. Many of them had already appeared on other trivia-based game shows, including Avila and Warren, who were previously winning contestants on Jeopardy! and Win Ben Stein's Money respectively. The window between Avila's test and when his episode taped was only three days, as he took the test on a Saturday and taped the show the following Tuesday. Once the show became a regular series, Fox began a more nationwide search for contestants, and any legal resident of the U.S. was invited to call or mail in an entry for a chance to audition. Some travel and accommodations were provided by Priceline.com.

Like Millionaire, Greed's basic set was atypical of the traditional game show, giving the show a more dramatic feel. The New York Times' Julia Chaplin compared the set to a video game, saying it was "painted to look like stone blocks, reminiscent of the torch-lighted medieval castles in games like Doom and Soul Calibur." Greed's set designer, Jimmy Cuomo, noted the inspiration from science fiction in his set, specifically from Star Trek and various castle settings in video games.

Fox abruptly canceled the program on July 14, 2000. By 2001, Fox executives Sandy Grushow and Gail Berman had led a shift in the network's focus through a greater emphasis on scripted programming. In December 2000, Clark stated that he was working on a revised version of Greed that he would initially pitch to Fox and then propose to other networks. While this proposed revival was never launched, Greed's original 44-episode run was acquired by Game Show Network (GSN) for reruns in January 2002, and in Australia on Fox8 in 2006.

=== International versions ===
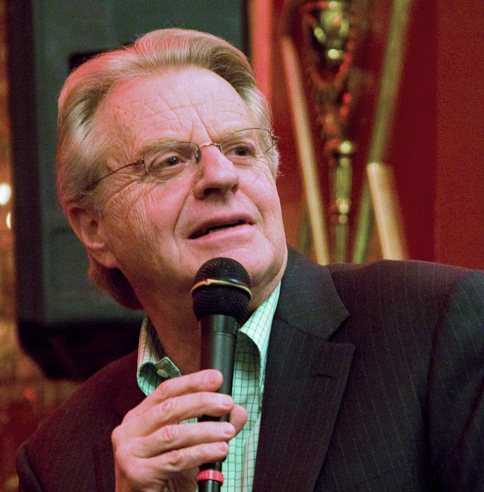
Jerry Springer (pictured in 2011) hosted the British adaptation of the series for Channel 5.

Following Greed's success in the United States, the show was adapted and recreated in several other countries as a worldwide franchise. American talk show host Jerry Springer hosted a British adaptation of the series on Channel 5 in 2001. Other versions of Greed have existed in Argentina, Australia, Denmark, Finland, France, Germany, Israel, Italy, Lebanon, Poland, Portugal, Russia, South Africa, Spain, Sweden, Turkey, and Venezuela. Additionally, the original American series aired in Canada on Global.

== Reception ==
Greed received mixed critiques. At the beginning of the show's run, some critics saw Greed as little more than a bad attempt to capitalize on ABC's success with Millionaire. Scott D. Pierce of Deseret News called the series "a rip-off" of Millionaire, adding "just how liberally Fox and Dick Clark Productions stole from the ABC hit is a bit of a shocker". Dana Gee of The Province wrote "Greed fails to entertain" while also criticizing the difficulty of the questions. Joyce Millman of Salon added, "a stench of desperation surrounds the show" and referred to it as "Fox's last hope" for a primetime hit that television season. Millionaire host Regis Philbin was unsurprised Fox launched a competing show, saying, "It's so Fox, isn't it?" In comparing Greed to Millionaire, New York Daily News's David Bianculli wrote that the former "doesn't have heart" as it allowed contestants to duel with each other, while also arguing Woolery lacked "warmth and empathy" as host compared to Philbin on Millionaire. Joanne Weintraub of the Milwaukee Journal Sentinel called Greed "a glum affair" and added that the show seemed "more tedious than tense." Alan Pergament of The Buffalo News shared the sentiment that Greed was little more than a Millionaire rip-off, though he conceded its Nielsen ratings "were good by Fox standards."

Others were more favorable of Greed, particularly due to its elements of drama. Writing for The New York Times two weeks after the show's debut, Caryn James believed Greed was a more dramatic show than Millionaire, comparing it to "blood sport" and saying it "evokes uglier sentiments and brings in less conventional contestants". Time's James Poniewozik gave the series a more positive review, arguing that "Greed Trumps Millionaire" based on its lack of lifelines and ability to pit teammates against each other. In December, United Media columnist Kevin McDonough stated that he also preferred Greed over the ABC game show, while Bill Carter (also of The New York Times) wrote that the series "has fared passably well".

Jeopardy! champion Bob Harris, who won $200,000 on an episode of Super Greed, compared the two trivia-based game shows in his 2006 book Prisoner of Trebekistan, saying, "If Jeopardy! was a relationship, Greed was a tawdry affair: quick, flashy, loud, and kind of confusing." Harris also recalled a conversation with Woolery years later where the Greed host himself admitted that the show's rules were "complicated." In 2019, Forbes's Marc Berman wrote an article titled "20 Years Later: I Still Feel The Need For Greed", arguing that the show could eventually be rebooted due to the "current era of [game show] revivals".

=== Ratings ===
Greed premiered with a 4.0 rating in adults 18–49 and a total of 9.9 million viewers, improving on Fox's Thursday night performance from its other shows that season. The rating gave Fox an improvement of more than 100 percent in that time slot over the previous week, marking the network's best Thursday ratings in more than six months. By mid-January 2000, Greed brought in around 12 million viewers, which marked Fox's best performance in the time slot since the debut of Millennium, although the number totaled less than half of Millionaire's audience of more than 28 million. Alan Johnson of the Chicago Tribune wrote that Greed's producers would occasionally have to displace the show and change its schedule to avoid going head-to-head against Millionaire. The July 14, 2000, episode (which would ultimately be the series finale) earned 6.7 million viewers.
