= Reality Binge =

- Reality Binge title card
- Starring: Eric Toms
- Country of origin: United States

Production
- Running time: 60 Minutes

Original release
- Network: Fox Reality Channel
- Release: July 10 – December 18, 2008

Reality Binge is a weekly Fox Reality Channel original series which features reality TV clips & reality commentary every week. The show is hosted by Eric Toms.

== History ==
Reality Binge premiered on July 10, 2008 on Fox Reality Channel.

It aired its last episode on December 18, 2008.

== Format ==
Reality Binge features the host, Eric Toms, on a green screen set. The show incorporates various segments that focus on reality television shows on all television networks, both broadcast and cable.
