= Shop 'til You Drop =

American game show

- Genre: Game show
- Directed by: Jeff Goldstein (1991–92); Bob Loudin (1992–94, 1996–97, 2000–02); Steve Grant (1997–98, 2000–02, 2003–05)
- Presented by: Pat Finn; JD Roberto
- Announcer: Mark L. Walberg; Jason Grant Smith; Dee Bradley Baker; Don Priess
- Country of origin: United States
- No. of seasons: 10
- No. of episodes: 980

Production
- Executive producers: David G. Stanley; Scott A. Stone
- Producers: David M. Greenfield, David Sittenfeld, Stephen Brown
- Production locations: Hollywood Center Studios (1991–93, 1996–98, 2000–02, 2003–05); Universal Studios Hollywood (1993–94)
- Running time: 22–26 minutes
- Production company: Stone Stanley Entertainment

Original release
- Network: Lifetime (1991–94); The Family Channel (1996–98); PAX (2000–05)
- Release: July 8, 1991 – May 27, 2005

Shop 'til You Drop is an American game show that was on the air intermittently between 1991 and 2005. Four different series were produced during that time, with the first premiering on Lifetime on July 8, 1991, and the fourth series airing its final episode on May 27, 2005, on PAX.

Pat Finn hosted the first three editions of Shop 'til You Drop, beginning in 1991 and ending in 2002. The announcers for those series were Mark L. Walberg, who announced from 1991 to 1994 and served as an on-air assistant, Jason Grant Smith, who was the original announcer for the second series in 1996 and 1997, and Dee Bradley Baker, who announced and co-hosted from 1997 to 1998 and again from 2000 until 2002.

The fourth series, which saw the show undergo a significant overhaul and format switch, was hosted by JD Roberto with Don Priess announcing.

== Broadcast history ==
Shop 'til You Drop aired on Lifetime from July 8, 1991 to September 30, 1994, with reruns airing until May 31, 1996. The show was produced by Stephen Brown. On June 17, 2015, GSN began airing reruns of this version, starting with episodes from 1993.

In December 1993, a one-hour Christmas special aired featuring celebrities playing for charity. Four teams competed instead of two, and gameplay was modified so that after the stunt round, the two lower-scoring teams were eliminated and the remaining two teams competed in the Shoppers' Challenge Round to determine a winner, where each correct answer was worth $500 and the time limit was increased to two minutes. Teams also played for money instead of points. In the Shop 'til You Drop round, the target was raised to $5,000 with a $10,000 bonus for reaching or exceeding that goal.

In 1996, The New Shop 'til You Drop was developed for The Family Channel as part of its afternoon game show block. The revival debuted on September 30, 1996, and ran until August 14, 1998.

Reruns of the 1996 series, as well as of the final season of the Lifetime edition, aired on PAX TV from April 5, 1999 to March 31, 2000, as part of an hour block of game show reruns with the final season of Supermarket Sweep. GSN reran the entire 1997–98 season in 2015.

PAX commissioned a new Shop 'til You Drop series that began airing on April 3, 2000. This series ran for two seasons and ended on May 24, 2002. Reruns of this 2000 series were picked up by GSN and began airing on December 2, 2013. Reruns continued through 2015.

The warehouse store edition of Shop 'til You Drop premiered on October 6, 2003, and ran until May 27, 2005. Reruns continued until August 11, 2006, by which time PAX had been rebranded as i: Independent Television (later changed to Ion Television).

Masters of episodes from the Family Channel and PAX versions as well as the unaired pilot episode can be viewed on the Game Show Vault's YouTube channel.
