= Rocket Arena (video game) =

2020 video game

- Developer: Final Strike Games
- Publisher: Electronic Arts
- Engine: Unreal Engine 4
- Platforms: Microsoft Windows; PlayStation 4 Xbox One
- Release: July 14, 2020
- Genres: Third-person shooter Hero shooter
- Mode: Multiplayer

Rocket Arena was a third-person shooter online video game developed by Final Strike Games and published by Electronic Arts. It was released for Windows, PlayStation 4 and Xbox One on July 14, 2020. The game received mixed to positive reviews, with praise for the gameplay, characters and visuals, while the lack of content received criticism. It was delisted from digital storefronts on November 18, 2023, and shut down on March 21, 2024.

== Gameplay ==
Rocket Arena is a 3v3 competitive multiplayer game played from a third-person perspective. At launch, the game features 10 maps and 10 playable characters, each of whom have different abilities. The player's main weapon is a rocket launcher, though there are items that the players can pick up in the arena. The game does not feature a health system and instead relies a system named Blast Meter. Whenever a player is hit by a rocket, their blast meter will fill up. A player with a full blast meter, when being hit by a rocket, will ricochet and fly out of the map, resulting in death. The player character is very mobile and has the ability to dodge other rockets, triple jump, and rocket jump.

The game was released with 5 modes at launch: Knockout and Megarocket are variants to standard team deathmatch and Capture the Flag mode. Rocketball sees players attempting to blast a ball using rockets into another team's goal. In Treasure Hunt, a treasure chest will spawn in the middle of the map and once a player picks up the chest, their teammates need to defend them so that the chest would not be stolen by other players. The game also features a cooperative multiplayer mode named Rocketbot Attack in which three players fend off waves of bots controlled by artificial intelligence.

== Development ==
Rocket Arena is the debut title for Final Strike Games, whose core team previously worked at 343 Industries and contributed to the multiplayer of Halo 5: Guardians. Initially the game was designed to be first-person, but the team switched it to third-person after implementing the dodge moveset. The game was showcased in May 2019 with it being a first-person shooter and had a closed beta from May 23 to May 29. It was originally due to be published by Nexon, but the publisher and developer Final Strike Games agreed to mutually part ways in July 2019. In June 2020, the game was announced to be coming out in July 2020. Electronic Arts published the game under its EA Originals program. It was released for Microsoft Windows, PlayStation 4 and Xbox One on July 14, 2020, with cross-platform play enabled. In September 2021, when Season 4 ended, some quality of life improvements were released. However, the game stopped getting updates and new seasons.

Rocket Arena was delisted from digital storefronts without prior warning on November 18, 2023. On December 14, 2023, EA and Final Strike Games announced that Rocket Arena would be shutting down its servers on March 21, 2024, whilst also announcing in-game events leading up to that date.

== Reception ==
Reception

Aggregate scores
| Aggregator | Score |
|---|---|
| Metacritic | PC: 73/100; PS4: 68/100; XONE: 71/100 |
| OpenCritic | 44% recommend |

Review scores
| Publication | Score |
|---|---|
| Game Informer | 7/10 |
| GameSpot | 6/10 |
| GamesRadar+ | 4/5 |
| PC Gamer (US) | 78/100 |
| PCGamesN | 7/10 |
| Push Square | 5/10 |
| USgamer | 3/5 |

Rocket Arena received generally mixed reviews upon release according to review aggregator Metacritic. Fellow review aggregator OpenCritic assessed that the game received fair approval, being recommended by 44% of critics.
