= NBC Daytime =

Daytime programming block on NBC

NBC Daytime was the daytime programming block of NBC. It historically featured many soap operas, game shows, and talk shows. Its main competitors were CBS Daytime (Skydance) and ABC Daytime (Disney).

Game shows were removed from NBC Daytime's lineup in 1994 and soap operas were largely dropped between the 1980s and the 1990s. By the 2000s, NBC Daytime had been reduced to only two shows: Days of Our Lives and Passions.

Passions was moved to DirecTV's now-defunct 101 Network in 2007. With Days of Our Lives being the only remaining daytime program on the network's schedule, the NBC Daytime branding was phased out entirely. In 2022, the network ultimately announced that Days of Our Lives would move exclusively to streaming on NBCUniversal's Peacock, and be replaced by an NBC News-produced news program. This resulted in the ending of traditional daytime programming on NBC and the turning over of daytime network controlled programming to NBC’s news division.

== Former shows on NBC Daytime ==
=== Soap operas ===
NBC has aired more than 30 soap operas for nearly 75 years. As of 2022, NBC no longer programs soap operas.

- Another World (1964–1999)
- Ben Jerrod (1963)
- The Bennetts (1953)
- Bright Promise (1969–1972)
- Concerning Miss Marlowe (1954–1955)
- A Date With Life (1955–1956)
- Days of Our Lives (1965–2022)
- The Doctors (1963–1982)
- Fairmeadows USA (1951–1952)
- First Love (1954–1955)
- From These Roots (1958–1961)
- Generations (1989–1991)
- Golden Windows (1954–1955)
- The Greatest Gift (1954–1955)
- Hawkins Falls (1951–1955)
- Hidden Faces (1968–1969)
- The House on High Street (1959–1960)
- How to Survive a Marriage (1974–1975)
- Kitty Foyle (1958)
- Lovers and Friends (1977–1978)
- Miss Susan (1951)
- Modern Romances (1954–1958)
- Moment of Truth (1964–1965)
- Morning Star (1965–1966)
- One Man's Family (1954)
- Our Five Daughters (1962)
- Paradise Bay (1965–1966)
- Passions (1999–2007)
- Return to Peyton Place (1972–1974)
- Santa Barbara (1984–1993)
- Search for Tomorrow (1982–1986)
- Somerset (1970–1976)
- Sunset Beach (1997–1999)
- Texas (1980–1982)
- These Are My Children (1949)
- Three Steps to Heaven (1953–1954)
- A Time to Live (1954)
- Today is Ours (1958)
- Way of the World (1955)
- Young Doctor Malone (1958–1963)

=== Game shows ===
NBC ended its game show block in 1991. They briefly revived the format with three game shows in the 1993–94 season but has not returned since. Some of NBC's local stations now program daytime game shows in their station-controlled blocks via syndication. All network-based game shows since 1993 have been weekly or semi-weekly primetime game shows.

- All Star Secrets (1979)
- Baffle (1973–1974)
- Battlestars/The New Battlestars (1981–1982, 1983)
- The Big Payoff (1951–1953)
- Blank Check (1975)
- Blockbusters (1980–1982, 1987)
- Break the Bank (1953)
- Caesars Challenge (1993–1994)
- Call My Bluff (1965)
- Card Sharks (1978–1981)
- Celebrity Sweepstakes (1974–1976)
- Chain Letter (1966)
- Chain Reaction (1980)
- Charge Account (1960–1962)
- Concentration (1958–1973; 1987–1991 as Classic Concentration)
- County Fair (1958–1959)
- Dough Re Mi (1958–1960)
- Dream House (1983–1984)
- Eye Guess (1966–1969)
- Family Secrets (1993)
- Fantasy (1982–1983)
- Feather Your Nest (1954–1956)
- 50 Grand Slam (1976)
- Fractured Phrases (1965)
- The Fun Factory (1976)
- Go! (1983–1984)
- The Gong Show (1976–1978)
- Haggis Baggis (1958–1959)
- High Rollers (1974–1976, 1978–1980)
- Hit Man (1983)
- The Hollywood Squares (1966–1980)
- Hot Potato (1984)
- I'll Bet (1965)
- It Could Be You (1956–1961)
- It Pays to Be Married (1955)
- It Takes Two (1969–1970)
- It's Anybody's Guess (1977)
- It's in the Bag (1952)
- Jackpot (1974–1975)
- Jeopardy! (1964–1975 and 1978–1979)
- Just Men! (1983)
- Knockout (1977–1978)
- Las Vegas Gambit (1980–1981)
- Ladies Choice (1953)
- Let's Make a Deal (1963–1968 and 1990–1991)
- Let's Play Post Office (1965–1966)
- Letters to Laugh-In (1969)
- Lucky Partners (1958)
- The Magnificent Marble Machine (1975–1976)
- The Match Game (1962–1969)
- The Match Game-Hollywood Squares Hour (1983–1984)
- Memory Game (1971)
- Mindreaders (1979–1980)
- Missing Links (1963–1964)
- Name That Tune (1974–1975; 1977)
- Name Droppers (1969)
- On Your Account (1953)
- Password Plus (1979–1982)
- People Will Talk (1963)
- Personality (1967–1969)
- Play Your Hunch (1959–1963)
- The Price Is Right (1956–1963; not to be confused with the current version, which premiered in 1972)
- Queen for a Day (1956–1960)
- The Ralph Edwards Show (1952)
- Reach for the Stars (1967)
- Remember this Date (1950–1951)
- Sale of the Century (1969–1973, 1983–1989)
- Say When!! (1961–1965)
- Scattergories (1993)
- Scrabble (1984–1990, 1993)
- Showdown (1966)
- Shoot for the Stars (1977)
- Snap Judgment (1967–1969)
- Split Personality (1959–1960)
- Stumpers! (1976)
- Super Password (1984–1989)
- Three for the Money (1975)
- Three on a Match (1971–1974)
- Tic-Tac-Dough (1956–1959)
- Time Machine (1985)
- To Say the Least (1977–1978)
- To Tell the Truth (1990–1991)
- Treasure Hunt (1957–1959)
- Truth or Consequences (1956–1965)
- Twenty-One (1956–1958)
- What's This Song? (1964–1965)
- Wheel of Fortune (1975–1989, 1991)
- The Who, What, or Where Game (1969–1974)
- Win, Lose or Draw (1987–1989)
- Winner Take All (1952)
- Winning Streak (1974–1975)
- The Wizard of Odds (1973–1974)
- Word for Word (1963–1964)
- Wordplay (1986–1987)
- Words and Music (1970–1971)
- You Don't Say! (1963–1969)
- Your First Impression (1962–1964)
- Your Number's Up (1985)
- You're Putting Me On (1969)

=== Talk, informational, variety, and magazine shows ===
- America Alive! (1978–1979)
- The Arlene Francis Show (1957–1958)
- Ask Washington (1954)
- The Betty White Show (1954)
- The Bill Goodwin Show (1951–1952)
- The Bob Smith Show (1954)
- Breakfast in Hollywood (1954)
- Breakfast Party (1952)
- Bride and Groom (1953–1954, 1957–1958)
- The Bunch (1952)
- Close-Up (1957–1958)
- A Closer Look with Faith Daniels (1991–1993)
- Club 60 (1957–1958)
- The Court of Human Relations (1959)
- Cover to Cover (1991)
- Dave and Charley (1952)
- The David Letterman Show (1980)
- Dinah's Place (1970–1974)
- Dr. Dean (1992–1993)
- The Ernie Kovacs Show (1955–1956)
- Glamour Girl (1953–1954)
- A Guest in Your House (1951)
- Here's Hollywood (1960–1962)
- Hollywood Today with Sheilah Graham (1955)
- Home (1954–1957)
- It's a Problem (1952)
- It's Time for Ernie (1951)
- The Jane Whitney Show (1994)
- John & Leeza from Hollywood (1993)
- The Johnny Dugan Show (1952)
- The Kate Smith Hour (1950–1954)
- Kovacs on the Corner (1952)
- Later Today (1999–2000)
- Leeza (1993–1999)
- Life With Linkletter (1969–1970)
- The Marsha Warfield Show (1990–1992)
- Matinee in New York (1952)
- The Merv Griffin Show (1962–1963)
- NBC Bandstand (1956)
- One on One with John Tesh (1991)
- The Other Side (1994–1995)
- Parent's Time (1955)
- The Pat Boone Show (1966–1967)
- The Ransom Sherman Show (1950–1951)
- The Regis Philbin Show (1981–1982)
- Ruth Lyons 50 Club (1951–1952)
- The Search for Beauty (1955)
- Straw Hat Matinee (1951)
- The Swift Home Service Club (1947–1948)
- Take My Advice (1976)
- Ted Mack Matinee (1955)
- The Tennessee Ernie Ford Show (1955–1956)
- Trialwatch (1991)
- Welcome Travelers (1952–1954)
- The World at Home (1955)

== Executives ==
Head of writer development

- Madeline David (1975–1979)
- Linda Line (1979–1987)

Name	Title	Years	Notes
Lin Bolen	Vice President of Daytime Programming	1972–1976	Served as head of writer development from 1968 to 1975. Bolen was appointed Vice President of Daytime Programming in 1972. She became the first female Vice President of Programming at a TV network and took NBC to #1 in the national Nielsen ratings. In 1975, Bolen expanded Days of Our Lives and Another World to an hour-long, which attracted new viewers and became hits with young women. Bolen cancelled the 15-year run of game show Concentration in early 1973 to replace it with game show Baffle, which ran one year, in order to increase ratings of younger female audiences as daytime and late-night were seen as NBC's profit center at that time, and advertisers wanted programs that attracted young women. Bolen also ended the eleven-year run of Jeopardy!, feeling its demographics were old. The show's creator and producer Merv Griffin did not wish to change the show's format making Bolen commission a new game show from Griffin, Wheel of Fortune, which debuted on January 6, 1975, and was an immediate ratings hit; Jeopardy! would later be revived in 1984. Bolen departed NBC Daytime in Spring 1976 while it was still #1 to form her own Production Company, "Lin Bolen Productions, Inc.".
Madeline B. David	Vice President of Daytime Programming	1976–1977	
Michael Brockman	Vice President of Daytime Programming	1977–1981	Responsible for overseeing the development of Card Sharks, the first game show produced by Goodson-Todman Productions in 9 years since the cancellation of The Match Game, and a revival of High Rollers, turned NBC's fortunes around after a series of struggling shows.
Fred Silverman	President of Daytime Programming	1978–1982	Retooled Lovers and Friends and replaced it with For Richer, For Poorer – which lasted a short while; L&F/FRFP was a replacement for the cancelled Somerset; changed the line-up consisting of three soaps, Days of Our Lives, The Doctors and Another World; expanded Another World to 90 minutes which coincided with the death of character John Randolph (Michael M. Ryan); had to cut back AW to 60 minutes (from 90 minutes) to make room for another one of Another World's spinoff shows, Texas; canceled Password Plus to make room for the relocating Search for Tomorrow, and canceled The Doctors along Texas on December 31, 1982, right before he left NBC.
Earl Greenburg	Vice President of Daytime Programming	1981–1983	
Susan D. Lee	Senior Vice President of Daytime Programming	1983–2000	Began in 1983 while having second-in-command vice presidents working alongside of her throughout her tenure with NBC Daytime. In 1996, there was uproar when Another World killed off the character of Frankie Frame. Word had it that both Susan Lee and then-Executive Producer Jill Farren Phelps chose Frankie as the next victim in the show's stalker storyline while then-head writer Margaret DePriest ran with the idea and crafted the excessively violent murder for Frankie.
Brian Frons	Vice President of Daytime Programming	1983–1991	Under his leadership of NBC Daytime, he brought in several new game shows such as Dream House, GO!, Hit Man, Hot Potato, The Match Game – Hollywood Squares Hour, Time Machine, Your Number's Up, and Wordplay – all were canceled due to low ratings and neither lasted more than just one season. The only games that would make it pass season 1 or more were Sale of The Century (1983–1989; revival of the 1969–73 original, which also aired on NBC), Super Password (1984–1989), Classic Concentration (1987–91) and Scrabble (1984–1993). He canceled the long running daytime version of Wheel of Fortune (1975–1989). He also added a new soap opera Santa Barbara (1984–1993). He canceled Search for Tomorrow in December 1986, after it was on NBC for four years. Frons previously work for Search For Tomorrow, while working as the head for CBS Daytime. Frons appeared as God on Santa Barbara in a dream sequence involving Mason Capwell (Lane Davies). He helped Santa Barbara garner three daytime Emmys for Best Drama series and brought the soap Generations (1989–1991).
John Rohrbeck	Vice President of Daytime Programming	1991–1996	Gave Another World another shot to improve ratings and offered them an extension on their contract and instead first, Generations was canceled in 1991 and then Santa Barbara, two years later in 1993.
Don Ohlmeyer	Vice President of Daytime Programming	1996–1999	Brought soap opera Sunset Beach, canceled Another World and replaced it with Passions in July 1999.
Sheraton Kalouria	Vice President of Daytime Programming	2000–2005	Appointed in the spring of 2000 to replace outgoing longtime Senior Vice President Susan Lee. Kalouria had previously worked on ABC Daytime as Vice President of marketing and promotion of daytime since 1998. Kalouria new job with NBC Daytime was to head development and strategic planning for Days of Our Lives and Passions.
Jeff Zucker	President of Daytime Programming	2000–2007	Canceled the soap Passions and sent it to Direct TV's 101 Channel in 2007. Made a statement about Days of Our Lives in 2007 that the show would most likely not "continue past 2009".
Annamarie Kostura	Vice President of Daytime Programming	200?–2007	Still in the position by June 2007
Bruce Evans	Senior Vice President of Daytime Programming	2007–2021	Promoted to Senior Vice President on Monday, February 4, 2007. Mr. Evans had already been working at NBC in different positions for several years by the time of his promotion. Mr. Evans previously served as Vice President, Current Series, since July 2000. Among the shows he oversaw included Heroes, Law & Order, Medium, Crossing Jordan, and Just Shoot Me. He served as a Director of Primetime series since July 1998 and a manager of Primetime since August 1997. In August 1996, he began his program executive career at NBC as an Entertainment Associate after his job as a coordinator in the same department. In his new position, Evans handles many of NBC's current series as well as having responsibility as head of the daytime programming that is included under Current Series, while also serving as a liaison for Paula Madison, Executive Vice President, Diversity, NBC Universal & Company Officer, General Electric, and her staff as they look to increase more diverse in front of as well as behind the camera on NBC's shows. At the time of his promotion, NBC was a month away from deciding on whether to keep or drop Days of Our Lives, however the opportunity was seen as the ticket to installing new life in the show. Days was renewed and remains on air to date while Evans decided to cancel lowest rated soap Passions. As part of a content restructure, Bruce Evans was let go from NBC in February 2021. The daytime division was folded into current programming under the supervision of Jeff Meyerson, President of Scripted Content.

== Proposed series ==
- Coming of Age: created by Bill Bell Jr.
- Days of Our Lives spin-offs
- House of Hope (Spinoff of The Doctors; passed over in favor of Somerset)

== See also ==
- ABC Daytime
- CBS Daytime
