= Ralph Andrews Productions =

American television production company

- Formerly: Andrews-Spears Productions (1958-1961); Andrews-Yagemann Productions (1961-1967); MC Productions (1972)
- Company type: Private
- Industry: Television production
- Founded: 1958; 68 years ago
- Founder: Ralph Andrews
- Fate: Library owned by Mark Phillips Philms and Telephision
- Headquarters: Los Angeles, California
- Owner: Meredith Corporation (1970-1972)

Ralph Andrews Productions is a television production company that was founded in 1958 by Ralph Andrews, and initially partnered with Harry Spears and Bill Yagemann. The company was better known for Lie Detector, You Don't Say, It Takes Two, Liar's Club, It's Your Bet and Lingo.

Most of the library and formats was held today was Mark Phillips Philms and Telephision.

== History ==
In 1958, Ralph Andrews, a small television producer, partnered with director Harry Spears and distributor David L. Wolper formed Andrews-Spears-Wolper Productions. Its first projects were Divorce Hearing, a syndicated television series, and Ex-Convict, also made for syndication. Another project the trio had was a unsold syndicated pilot Stranger Than Fiction. Wolper later leave to form an independent production company, Wolper Productions in 1959, leaving Andrews and Spears in charge under a new name Andrews-Spears Productions.

The company continued to produce shows for local television stations in Los Angeles, such as that of KTLA and KTTV. One of them was Lie Detector, which was hosted by Andrews himself. He briefly worked for Trojan Productions and again with Wolper Productions themselves.

In 1961, the company entered into a partnership with Desilu, the company later broke off in the mid 1960s. The company continued to produce local shows made for KTLA, such as Zoom, By the Numbers, You Don't Say, Show Me and I'll Bet. Two of its properties were adapted nationally by NBC, mainly You Don't Say and I'll Bet, although You Don't Say was a hit that made the company a breakthrough, and was a success.

In 1967, Yagemann sold his stock to Andrews, as Bill Yagemann made a desire to produce feature films, ending the partnership with Yagemann, as the company becoming Ralph Andrews Productions. In 1969, the company made Liar's Club for Metromedia stations, as well as It's Your Bet, mostly for NBC television stations.

In 1970, he briefly sold his company to television broadcaster Meredith Corporation, and briefly becoming MC Productions in 1972, before reacquiring the rights to the game shows in late 1972, which resulted in a civil action lawsuit in the late 1970s. In 1974, the company briefly sold Celebrity Sweepstakes to Burt Sugarman shortly after its debut, only to be reacquired in 1976. In 1978, the rights to Liar's Club was sold to Golden West Broadcasters. In 1979, the company entered bankruptcy.

From 1980 to 1986, Andrews and his production company had an office at Columbia Pictures' lot located at the Burbank Studios in Burbank, California. Andrews had a deal with Columbia Pictures Television to present projects to the studio. If CPT wasn't interested, Andrews had the right to pass on the project to other studios as long as he was properly credited; the provisions in the contract led to a lawsuit filed against Paramount Television by Andrews over the 1984 game show Anything for Money, which had originated in Andrews' production company.

In 1989, the company entered into a partnership with IDTV to form IDRA Global Entertainment (IDRA was short for IDTV, and Ralph Andrews), mainly to sell formats for Europe and the United States. The library and its formats was later sold to Mark Phillips Philms and Telephision in the mid 1990s.

== Programs ==
=== Television programs ===
Title	Year	Network	Notes
Divorce Hearing	1958-1959	Syndication	co-production with Wolper Productions
Lie Detector	1961; 1983	KHJ-TV; KTTV; Syndication	co-production with Columbia Pictures Television (1983) and Sandy Frank Film Syndication (1983)
You Don't Say	1962-1969; 1975; 1978-1979	KTLA; NBC; ABC; Syndication	co-production with Desilu Productions (1962-1967), Paramount Television (1968-1969), Carruthers Company (1975), Warner Bros. Television (1975) and Viacom Enterprises (1978-1979)
Zoom	1962	KTLA	co-production with Desilu Productions
By the Numbers	1962-1963	KTLA	co-production with Desilu Productions
Show Me	1964	KTLA	co-production with Desilu Productions
I'll Bet	1964-1965	KTLA; NBC	
Mickie Finn's	1966	NBC	as The Finns-A-Y Company
Wedding Party	1968	ABC	co-production with Art Stark Productions
It Takes Two	1969-1970	NBC	
It's Your Bet	1969-1973	Syndication	co-production with NBC Films (1969-1970) and Rhodes Productions (1970-1973)
Liar's Club	1969; 1974-1979	Syndication; KTLA	co-production with Metromedia Producers Corporation (1969), Golden West Broadcasters (1974-1979), 20th Century Fox Television (1976-1978) and Sandy Frank Syndication (1978-1979)
Celebrity Sweepstakes	1974-1977	NBC; Syndication	co-production with Burt Sugarman Productions (1974-1976), Carbie Productions (1974-1975) and 20th Century Fox Television (1976-1977)
50 Grand Slam	1976	NBC	
Lingo	1987-1988	Syndication	co-production with Bernstein/Hovis Productions, CCR Video Corporation and ABR Entertainment Company
Yahtzee	1988	Syndication	co-production with Peter Marshall Enterprises, Bernstein/Hovis Productions, CCR Video Corporation and ABR Entertainment Company

=== Films ===
Title	Year	Distributor	Notes
Silent Treatment	1968	N/A	
Wild in the Sky	1972	American International Pictures	
