= Jack Narz =

American radio personality, television host, and singer (1922–2008)

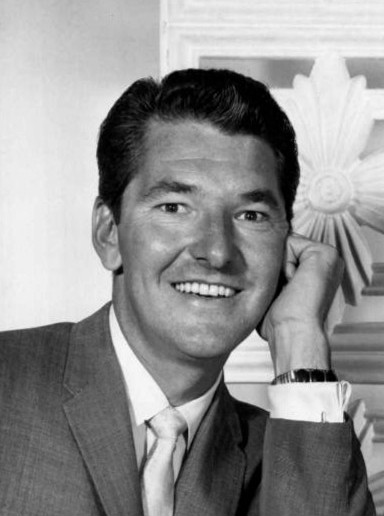
- Narz in 1960
- Born: John Lawrence Narz Jr. November 13, 1922; Louisville, Kentucky, US
- Died: October 15, 2008 (aged 85); Los Angeles, California, US
- Occupations: TV presenter; radio personality; game show host; singer
- Years active: 1949–1987
- Notable credit(s): Now You See It; Concentration; Beat the Clock; Dotto; Seven Keys; Video Village
- Spouses: Mary Lou Roemheld (m. 1947; div. 1961) Barbara Bricker (m. 1964; div. 1966) Dolores Vaichsner (m. 1969)
- Children: 4
- Relatives: Tom Kennedy (brother)

John Lawrence Narz Jr. (November 13, 1922 – October 15, 2008) was an American radio personality, television host, and singer.

== Early years ==
Narz was born to John and Ado Narz, in Louisville, Kentucky, of Lithuanian descent, along with sister Mary and younger brother James Edward (1927–2020). James later changed his name to Tom Kennedy and went on to have his own career as a television host.

Narz served as a military fighter pilot during World War II, receiving the Distinguished Flying Cross for missions flown in the China-Burma theater.

== Career ==
=== Radio ===
After his military service, Narz attended the Don Martin School of Radio Arts in Hollywood, where he received his broadcasting diploma in June 1947. He worked as an announcer at California radio stations KXO-AM, El Centro; KWIK-FM, Burbank; KIEV, Glendale; and KLAC-AM, Los Angeles.

=== Television ===
==== Voice-over ====
Narz broke into television doing commercials for a men's store as "Jack Narz, the man from Barr's". It led to early voice work as one of the narrators for Adventures of Superman. Narz also made appearances in local Los Angeles television and served as the announcer on one of TV's first nationally broadcast children's shows, the 1950s science-fiction program Space Patrol.

Narz first achieved television fame in 1952 as the on-camera announcer and narrator of the syndicated sitcom Life with Elizabeth starring Betty White. He returned to his role as on-camera announcer and narrator for a restaging of Life with Elizabeth (along with Betty White) for KCOP-TV's 50th anniversary special 13 at 50 in 1998.

In 1955, as he did on radio, Narz served as the announcer-sidekick of bandleader Bob Crosby on The Bob Crosby Show on daytime TV. That same year, he also worked as announcer on Place the Face, a game show hosted by Bill Cullen and earlier by Jack Bailey.

By the end of 1957, Narz's success led him to relocate with his family from Southern California to the suburbs of New York City.

==== Dotto ====
In January 1958, Narz began hosting his own game show, presiding over CBS's Dotto. Within a brief time the show became very popular, with Dotto running five days a week on CBS and, beginning in the summer of 1958, weekly in prime time on NBC. Dotto was later part of the 1950s quiz show scandals and was the first popular quiz show to be abruptly cancelled as a result. Narz was not involved in the deception and cheating on Dotto, and was immediately absolved of any responsibility when the story broke.

==== Game-show host ====
Narz soon went on to host Dotto's replacement, Top Dollar, succeeding its first host, Warren Hull, as part of an arrangement made with CBS and the ad agency representing the Colgate-Palmolive Company and General Mills, with whom Narz was under contract at the time. In 1960, he guest-hosted for a month on The Price Is Right, while regular host Bill Cullen took a vacation. Later that year, he was the host of Video Village, but asked producers to let him leave the show for personal reasons; Monty Hall succeeded him.

After relocating to Los Angeles, Narz hosted Seven Keys, which started as a local show, but then moved to ABC (1961–1964). It later returned as a local show on KTLA in Los Angeles until January 1965. It was followed by a 13-week run on a new NBC game show titled I'll Bet. In 1969, Narz began an association with Mark Goodson-Bill Todman Productions that lasted the remainder of his career. That year, Narz began hosting the syndicated revival of Beat the Clock, doing so until 1972 when the show's announcer, Gene Wood, replaced him.

In 1973, Narz started hosting Concentration. It aired in syndication until 1978 and was his longest-running job as host. He also emceed Now You See It on CBS from 1974 to 1975. In 1979, Narz served as the announcer and an associate producer for the CBS revival of Beat the Clock which was hosted by Monty Hall. Narz also was used as a sub-announcer for Gene Wood on the NBC version of Card Sharks.

In 1981, Narz hosted a pilot for Paramount called Phrase It, which did not sell. His final game show work was hosting You've Got to Be Kidding, which was broadcast in the Los Angeles/metropolitan area on station KDOC-TV in Anaheim, California during the 1987–1988 season.

==== Joint appearances ====
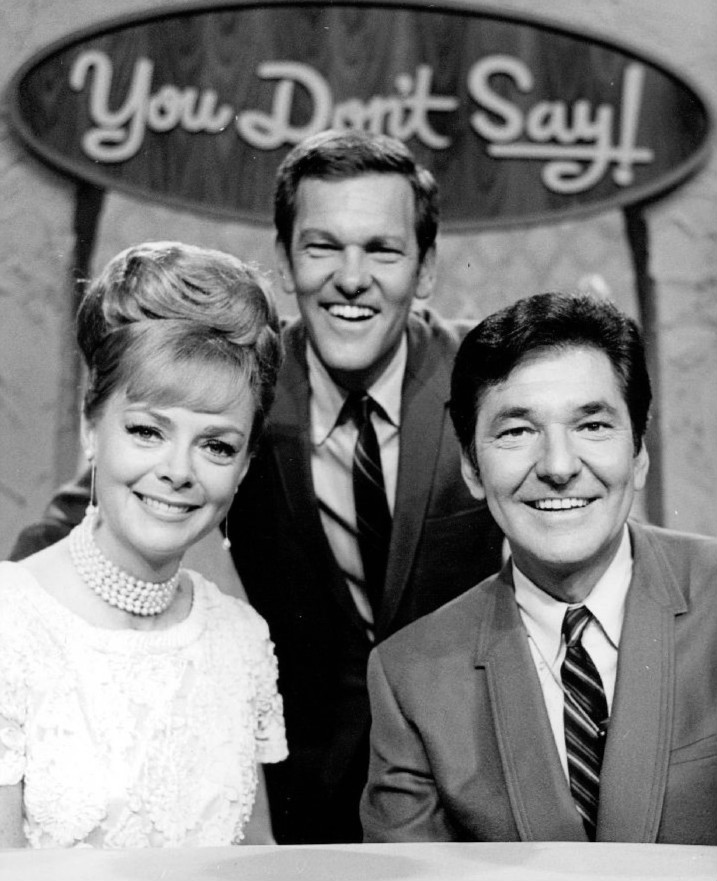
Narz with brother Tom Kennedy and actress June Lockhart, 1968

While Narz and his brother Tom Kennedy forged successful individual careers as broadcasters and hosts, they also made occasional joint appearances.

Kennedy guest-starred on Narz's Beat the Clock, and Narz appeared on Kennedy's You Don't Say! during its NBC run, and on the syndicated It's Your Bet. Narz also appeared on the Password Plus panel while Kennedy was hosting, and even switched with his brother to host for half of an episode. On the March 5, 1982, episode of Password Plus, Narz appeared as a celebrity guest for the week, along with Steven Ford; following a discussion between Kennedy and Narz about how easy it is to be unable to recall good clues under pressure, Narz offered to switch places with Kennedy, which (with the contestants' permission, as Kennedy had not been informed of the clues beforehand) they did for the remainder of the episode.

Both brothers also appeared on To Tell the Truth as celebrity panelists.

=== Singing ===
Narz occasionally sang on The Bob Crosby Show while serving as its announcer. He also recorded an album, Sing the Folk Hits With Jack Narz (Dot Records DLP-3244 (monaural)/Dot DLPS-25244 (stereophonic), which was released in 1959.

== Personal life ==
Narz's first wife was Mary Lou Roemheld, daughter of Oscar-winning composer Heinz Roemheld and the sister of Bill Cullen's wife, Ann. They had three sons, John, Michael, and David, and a daughter, Karen. They divorced in 1961.

On November 14, 1964, Narz married radio station program director Barbara Bricker, a former model and television actress. They divorced in 1966.

In 1969, he married Dolores "Doe" Vaichsner. She was the number one flight attendant for TWA for nearly 50 years. Jack and Dolores remained married for 39 years, until his death.

== Death ==
On October 15, 2008, Narz died at Cedars-Sinai Hospital in Beverly Hills, California, following two strokes and complications from kidney failure. He was 85.

== See also ==
- List of people from the Louisville metropolitan area

Media offices
Preceded by Bud Collyer	Host of Beat the Clock; 1969–1972	Succeeded by Gene Wood
Preceded by Bob Clayton	Host of Concentration; 1973–1978	Succeeded by Alex Trebek on Classic Concentration (1987–1991)
Preceded by None	Host of Now You See It; 1974–1975	Succeeded by Chuck Henry in 1989
