= Love handles =

"Love handles" is an informal term for the sides of deposits of excess fat at the side of one's waistline, and may also refer to:

- Love Handles (game show), a Canadian television game show
- Love Händel, a fictional band in Phineas and Ferb
