= Lie Detector (TV series) =

2005 American television series

- Created by: Ralph Andrews
- Developed by: Mark Philips
- Directed by: Rick Davis
- Starring: Rolonda Watts; Ed Gelb
- Country of origin: United States
- No. of seasons: 1
- No. of episodes: 13

Production
- Executive producer: Mark Philips
- Production companies: Mark Phillips Philms & Telephision

Original release
- Network: Pax TV
- Release: March 8 – June 28, 2005

Lie Detector is a television series broadcast in 2005 on Pax TV. Hosted by Rolonda Watts with assistance from polygraph administrator Dr. Ed Gelb, the show claims to "[examine] the truth behind real-life stories ripped from the headlines." It premiered on March 8, 2005 and ended after one season. Other versions under the same title have aired under various arrangements in the past, as described further below.

Its first episode featured a polygraph examination of Paula Jones, a woman who had accused Bill Clinton of sexual harassment.

Two earlier versions of the shows were hosted by Ralph Andrews in 1961 on KHJ-TV and later on KTTV, and produced by Andrews-Spears Productions and then hosted by F. Lee Bailey in syndication in 1983, produced by Ralph Andrews Productions, Columbia Pictures Television and Sandy Frank Film Syndication, also involving Gelb, which included appearances by Caril Ann Fugate, Melvin Dummar and Ronald Reagan's barber.

== Episodes ==
Series #	Guests	Original airdate
1	Paula Jones with Clinton allegations; a man who possibly profited from a donated kidney	March 8, 2005
2	Enoch Lonnie Ford with allegations of having a homosexual affair with televangelist Paul Crouch; a man accused of killing three men; and a woman possibly suffering from Munchausen syndrome	March 15, 2005
3	A man who believes that government records support the existence of UFOs; a woman who allegedly pushed an elderly patient; a woman accused of robbing a woman at gunpoint	April 19, 2005
4	Man accused of pushing wife; two hunters	April 26, 2005
5	Former doctor who wants medical license back; a woman with a money laundering scam; Matthew Lesko, who writes books on how to get free money from the government	May 3, 2005
6	Man with prescription marijuana; woman accused of stealing; woman who claims that baseball's Gary Sheffield is the father of her daughter	May 10, 2005
7	Employee wants to prove that her pay was legitimate; a man who wants to prove he did not murder his girlfriend; a man who claims he was in a gorilla suit in 1967 Bigfoot short film	May 17, 2005
8	A man who argues Congress could have prevented the 9/11 attacks; man claims mistaken identity; woman wants to know if 10 year girlfriend ever will marry her	May 24, 2005
9	Jeff Gannon defends White House briefings; man wants to prove to girlfriend he no longer smokes pot; man threatened by police operative	May 31, 2005
10	Man wrongfully sentenced for having crack; owner of Mickey Mantle's Deli; college roommate of Wal-Mart heiress Elizabeth Paige Laurie tries to show that she was paid to write her school papers	June 7, 2005
11	Ben Rowling wants to show that he is the real-life inspiration for the famous character from Harry Potter; a woman who wants to show that her lover confessed to murdering his ex-wife; woman wants to prove she was not involved in a kidnapping	June 14, 2005
12	David Lander wants to prove that his reputation as a drunk is unfounded; school teacher claims she never threatened to kill principal; man who wants to prove he was falsely convicted of cocaine possession.	June 21, 2005
13	A woman who claims to have had contact with extraterrestrials; a woman who wants to prove that former Venezuelan dictator Marcos Pérez Jiménez is the father of her daughter.	June 28, 2005
