= Relatively Speaking (game show) =

US television program

Relatively Speaking is an American game show that aired in first-run syndication from September 5, 1988, to June 23, 1989.

The series was hosted by comedian John Byner, with John Harlan announcing (though Dean Goss filled in for Harlan during the next-to-last week). The object of the game was for four celebrities to identify a famous person who is related to an in-studio contestant.

Playing on Byner's comedic skills, before each day's first game began, a video clip was shown of Byner impersonating a famous character (e.g., Indiana Jones) or person while explaining the rules of the game.

== Production ==
Relatively Speaking was produced in Los Angeles. The series' production firms Kushner-Locke and The Maltese Companies. The show has a runtime of 30 minutes. John Byner hosted the show and John Harlan announced. Each time Byner tells contestants the game's rules, he humorously conveys it in a unique way by mimicking celebrities like Bing Crosby and John Wayne. Relatively Speaking aired in 96 markets.

== Gameplay ==
=== First Rounds ===
In the first two (later three) rounds, the celebrity panel asked yes or no questions to the contestant. The panelist in control kept asking questions until receiving a "no" (similar to What's My Line? and the later series Figure it Out). Early in the run, the host gave a clue as to the famous person's identity, but not the cast later in the run The contestant won a growing prize package for each "no". If the panel received eight "no" answers, they were stumped and the contestant won a grand prize package (dubbed the "Super Stumper Jackpot").

=== Final Round (Celebrity Round) ===
In the final round of the day, the final contestant appeared along with another celebrity guest with his/her children, all of whom were hidden away from the panel. The contestant still won an accumulating prize package. Regardless if the panel was stumped or named the celebrity relative, the celebrity's winnings were donated to charity.
