= Lin Bolen =

American television executive and producer (1941–2018)

- Born: March 21, 1941; Benton, Illinois U.S.
- Died: January 19, 2018 (aged 76); Santa Monica, California U.S.
- Other name: Lin Bolen Wendkos
- Occupations: Vice President of Daytime Programming, NBC (1972–1976); Television producer
- Years active: 1972–late 1990s
- Spouse: Paul Wendkos (m. 1983; died 2009)

Lin Bolen (March 21, 1941 – January 19, 2018) was an American television executive and producer. She was most noted for her role at NBC daytime television programming as the first female vice president of a TV network, a position she held from 1972 until 1976. In this role, Bolen was responsible for commissioning the long-running game show Wheel of Fortune and is credited with bringing successful long form to network soap operas. Bolen was mentioned in Who's Who in America as a trailblazer for women in television.

== Early life and education ==
Bolen was born in Benton, Illinois. Her father was a United Mine Workers union organizer. Her sister Marilyn Bolen was notable for being the first woman stockbroker to work on the St. Louis exchange floor.

Bolen graduated from Benton Consolidated High School. She attended Miss Hickey's School in St. Louis. From 1961 to 1963, she attended City College of New York, where she studied advertising and communications media.

== Career ==
In 1961, Bolen began her career producing commercials. She then worked on documentaries about Twiggy, and then as a writer and producer of documentary films, which included Crisis in America – Welfare for ABC-TV and Stravinsky's Requiem to Martin Luther King with the New York City Ballet.

Bolen was appointed Vice President of Daytime Programming at NBC in 1972. In September 1975, she was the first female Vice President of Programming at a TV network and took NBC to #1 in the national Nielsen ratings. She developed an expanded format for Days of Our Lives and Another World, changing both to an hour-long running time. The expanded shows attracted new viewers and became hits with young women.

Although NBC was airing the successful game shows Hollywood Squares, Concentration, Jeopardy!, and Sale of the Century at the time, Bolen's mandate was to increase ratings of young women ages 18–34. Daytime and late-night were seen as NBC's profit center at that time, and advertisers wanted programs that attracted young women. In late 1972, Bolen ended Concentration 's fifteen-year run and replaced it with the Heatter-Quigley Productions game show Baffle. Baffle failed to compete with CBS's new game show, The $10,000 Pyramid, and was canceled on March 29, 1974.

Bolen also ended its run of Sale of the Century after just four years, and it was replaced by The Wizard of Odds, which marked the American hosting debut of Alex Trebek. However, it did not last long and it was replaced by High Rollers. Bolen later ended its runs of The Who, What, or Where Game and Return to Peyton Place in favor of giving the greenlight to Jackpot and How to Survive a Marriage. Bolen also ended their runs of the talk show Dinah's Place and the game show Three on a Match, being respectively replaced by a new version of Name That Tune and Winning Streak. Both did not last long past January 3, 1975.

Bolen also decided to end the eleven-year run of Jeopardy!, feeling that its demographics were old. The show's creator and producer Merv Griffin did not wish to change the show's format, so Bolen commissioned a new game show from Griffin called Wheel of Fortune. Two pilots were produced before the network was satisfied that young women would love the show, although Bolen risked being fired if the show failed. Wheel of Fortune debuted on January 6, 1975, and was an immediate ratings hit.

In the spring of 1976, while NBC was still the #1 network in daytime, Bolen left the network to become an independent TV producer. She formed her own production company called Lin Bolen Productions. The new company created and developed game shows, movies of the week, and theatrical films for networks and studios.

Bolen created the game show Stumpers! hosted by Allen Ludden, which was produced exclusively by Bolen's production company. The show was a word game with game elements similar to Password, which had also been hosted by Ludden. The show lasted 13 weeks before being canceled by new NBC vice president of daytime programming Madeline B. David.

One series which Bolen's company produced for NBC was loosely based on her own career, taking a serious look at the men who ran network television. W.E.B. was scheduled against ABC's hit series Charlie's Angels and did not perform well. It was canceled after 13 weeks. In 1982, Bolen was hired as head of creative affairs at InterMedia Entertainment, which was owned by Fred Silverman.

Bolen's company produced the television movie The Christmas Coal Mine Miracle, starring Kurt Russell and Melissa Gilbert, which became the highest rated movie of the year for NBC. Other films followed, including Good Against Evil starring Kim Cattrall and Dan O'Herlihy for ABC; Golden Gate starring Perry King, Melanie Griffith, and John Saxon; A two-hour pilot for ABC called Farrell for the People starring Valerie Harper and Ed O'Neill; a comedy pilot for NBC called The Ann Jillian Show, and an NBC summer variety pilot called Live From the South Seas starring John Rowles.

== Network ==
Bolen's career as a network executive provided an inspiration in the creation of Faye Dunaway's role as network executive Diana Christiansen in the 1976 satirical film about television, Network. However, in an interview with UPI in 1978, Bolen had said that the Network character was nothing like her.

== Personal life and death ==
After leaving NBC, Bolen married director Paul Wendkos in 1984. They remained married until his death on November 12, 2009.

Bolen died on January 19, 2018, at a hospital in Santa Monica, California, and was survived by her son, Jordan Wendkos.

== Selected filmography ==
- Crisis in America – Welfare
- Stravinsky's Requiem to Martin Luther King
- 1976: Stumpers! (TV Series) – Creator, executive producer, writer (1 episode)
- 1977: Good Against Evil (TV Movie) – Executive producer
- 1977: Christmas Miracle in Caufield, U.S.A. aka Christmas Coal Mine Miracle (TV Movie) – Producer
- 1978: W.E.B. (TV Series) – Executive producer (3 episodes)
- 1981: Golden Gate (TV Movie) – Producer
- 1982: Farrell for the People (TV Movie) – Producer
- 1984: Comedy Club (TV Movie) – Executive producer
- 1989-1990: Ann Jillian
- Live From the South Seas
