= Tom Kennedy (television host) =

American game show host (1927–2020)

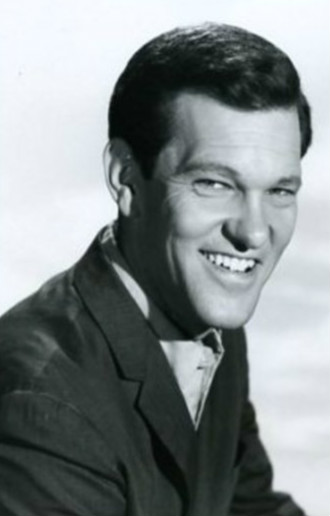
- Kennedy in the 1960s
- Born: James Edward Narz; February 26, 1927; Louisville, Kentucky, U.S.
- Died: October 7, 2020 (aged 93); Oxnard, California, U.S.
- Occupation: Game show host
- Years active: 1958–1989
- Notable credit(s): You Don't Say! (1963–69, 1975); Name That Tune (1974–1981); Whew! (1979–1980); Password Plus (1980–1982); Body Language (1984–1986); The Price Is Right (1985–1986, nighttime); Wordplay (1986–1987)
- Spouse: Betty Gevedon (m. 1952; died 2011)
- Children: 4
- Relatives: Jack Narz (brother)

James Edward Narz (February 26, 1927 – October 7, 2020), known professionally as Tom Kennedy, was an American television host best known for his work in game shows. Game shows Kennedy hosted included Password Plus, Split Second, Name That Tune, and You Don't Say!

== Early years ==
Born in Louisville, Kentucky, James Edward Narz was the son of John Lawrence Narz Sr., and the younger brother of host Jack Narz (1922–2008), whose son, David, related about his uncle's name change that the brothers wanted to avoid the perceived conflict of having two announcers with the same last name promoting competing products. "After a lunch meeting with his agent," he said, "... he emerged as Tom Kennedy."

Kennedy attended the University of Missouri and the University of Kentucky.

Kennedy did TV commercial spots for Regal Beer on Ozark Jubilee (later Jubilee USA), an ABC series which ran from 1955 to 1960. He introduced himself as Jim Narz in the commercials.

== Radio ==
While attending the University of Missouri, Kennedy worked at KFRU in Columbia, Missouri. While in Lexington, Kentucky, he worked at WKLX. After moving to Los Angeles, he worked for five years at KPOL and had a part-time job at KGIL.

== Shows ==
Kennedy's biggest hit series were You Don't Say! which aired on NBC from 1963 to 1969, and on ABC in 1975; Split Second (1972–1975); Name That Tune (1974–1981); and Password Plus, which he hosted from 1980 to 1982 following the illness (and later death) of original host Allen Ludden. His other hosting credits include The Big Game (1958), Dr. I.Q. (1958–59), It's Your Bet (1971–72), Break the Bank (1976), 50 Grand Slam (1976), To Say the Least (1977–78), Whew! (1979–80), Body Language (1984–1986), a syndicated nighttime version of The Price Is Right (1985–86) and Wordplay (1986–87). He briefly hosted a talk show, The Real Tom Kennedy Show, in the early 1970s, and appeared as a guest panelist on To Tell the Truth, Hollywood Squares, Liar's Club and other game shows. As an actor, he made guest appearances on such shows as The Ghost & Mrs. Muir, Rowan & Martin's Laugh-In, Cannon, That Girl, and Hardcastle and McCormick.

== Retirement and death ==
Kennedy retired in 1989 after several game show pilots produced by his production company failed to sell. In 2003, he appeared on Hollywood Squares during "Game Show Week Part 2".

After a period of ill health, Kennedy died at his home in Oxnard, California, on October 7, 2020, at the age of 93.

== Awards ==
In July 2005, Kennedy and his brother Jack Narz were co-recipients of the Game Show Congress's Bill Cullen Award for Lifetime Achievement. Cullen was a brother-in-law of Narz and Kennedy.

== See also ==
- List of people from the Louisville metropolitan area
