= Sing the Folk Hits With Jack Narz =

Studio album by Jack Narz
- Released: 1959
- Recorded: 1958–1959
- Genre: Folk; world; country
- Length: 24:41
- Label: Dot Records

Sing the Folk Hits With Jack Narz is a studio album by radio and television personality Jack Narz and featuring the Mort Lindsey orchestra. It was released by Dot Records in 1959.

== Track listing ==
No.	Title	Writer(s)	Length
1.	"Rovin' Gambler"	Mort Lindsey	1:50
2.	"Wreck of the John B"	Bob Kitsis	1:58
3.	"10,000 Miles"	Mort Lindsey	2:12
4.	"Goodnight Irene"	Huddie Ledbetter, John Lomax	2:02
5.	"Tom Dooley"	Bob Kitsis	2:14
6.	"Jimmy Brown the Newsboy"	A.P. Carter	2:01
7.	"A Worried Man"	Tom Glazer, Dave Guard	2:32
8.	"Clementine"	Mort Lindsey	2:26
9.	"Erie Barge Canal"	Thomas S. Allen, Dickinson, Copeland	1:58
10.	"Skip to My Lou"	Mort Lindsey	1:32
11.	"On Top of Old Smokey"	Lou Savarese	2:13
12.	"Highly Hope-Up"	Hood, Copeland	1:43
