= John Harlan (announcer) =

American television announcer (1925–2017)

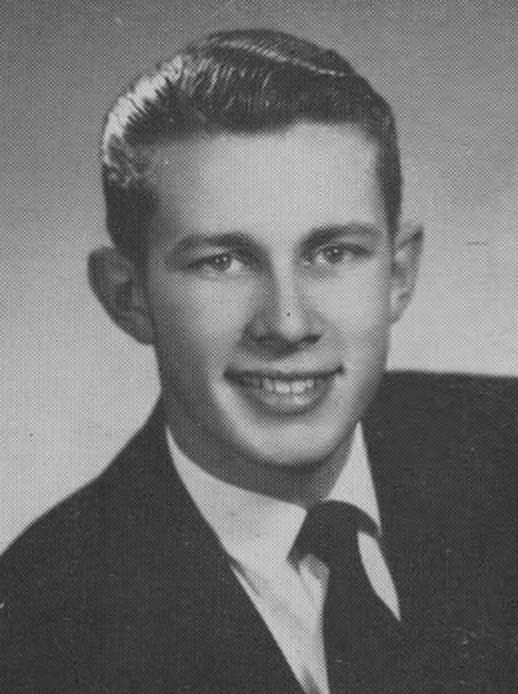
- Born: John Henry Harlan; December 21, 1925; Sonoma County, California, U.S.
- Died: February 27, 2017 (aged 91); Los Angeles, California, U.S.
- Education: California State University, Fresno
- Occupation: TV announcer

John Henry Harlan (December 21, 1925 – February 27, 2017) was an American television announcer who worked on television projects for over 40 years, particularly game and variety shows. He was from Sonoma County, California.

His work included You Don't Say!, Name That Tune, All-Star Blitz, Jeopardy! (1978 revival) produced between 1974 and 1985.

From 1990 to 1993, Harlan was the announcer on American Gladiators. He retired from announcing in 1993 and the Gladiators took turns announcing until 1996.

Harlan attended California State University, Fresno, graduating in 1948. He served as class president for the fall term. At school he was friends with Wendell Bell, serving as his best man at his 1947 wedding. He married Beverly Christensen, who was a model on Queen for a Day where Harlan was an announcer.

Harlan died on February 27, 2017, at the age of 91.

== Shows announced ==
- Golden Globe Awards
- People's Choice Awards
- Comic Relief (first special only; HBO, 1986)
- The Muppets: A Celebration of 30 Years (CBS special, 1986)
- Password (ABC, 1971–75)
- Tattletales (CBS, 1974)
- The Flip Wilson Show
- The Merv Griffin Show (when based in Los Angeles)
- You Don't Say! (all versions)
- Face the Music (1980–81)
- Queen for a Day
- The Cross-Wits
- Catchphrase
- Jeopardy! (NBC, 1978–79)
- The Krypton Factor
- American Gladiators (Syndicated, 1990–93)
- Press Your Luck (as a fill-in for Rod Roddy)
- Password Plus (as a fill-in for Gene Wood)
- Name That Tune; he also served as one of the show's associate producers
- Your New Day with Vidal Sassoon
- Lucky Numbers (pilot similar to High Rollers in 1985)
- 50 Grand Slam
- Wipeout
- All Star Blitz
- Celebrity Sweepstakes
- It Takes Two
- Relatively Speaking
- Sports Challenge (final season)
- Book of Lists
- General Hospital
- Jackpot! (Syndicated, 1989–90)
- UHF (Film, 1989; voice of in-film promos for U-62)
- Make Me Laugh (1979)

Harlan worked on occasional TV specials up until his death in 2017. He was also president of Pacific Pioneer Broadcasters.
