= Stumpers (game show) =

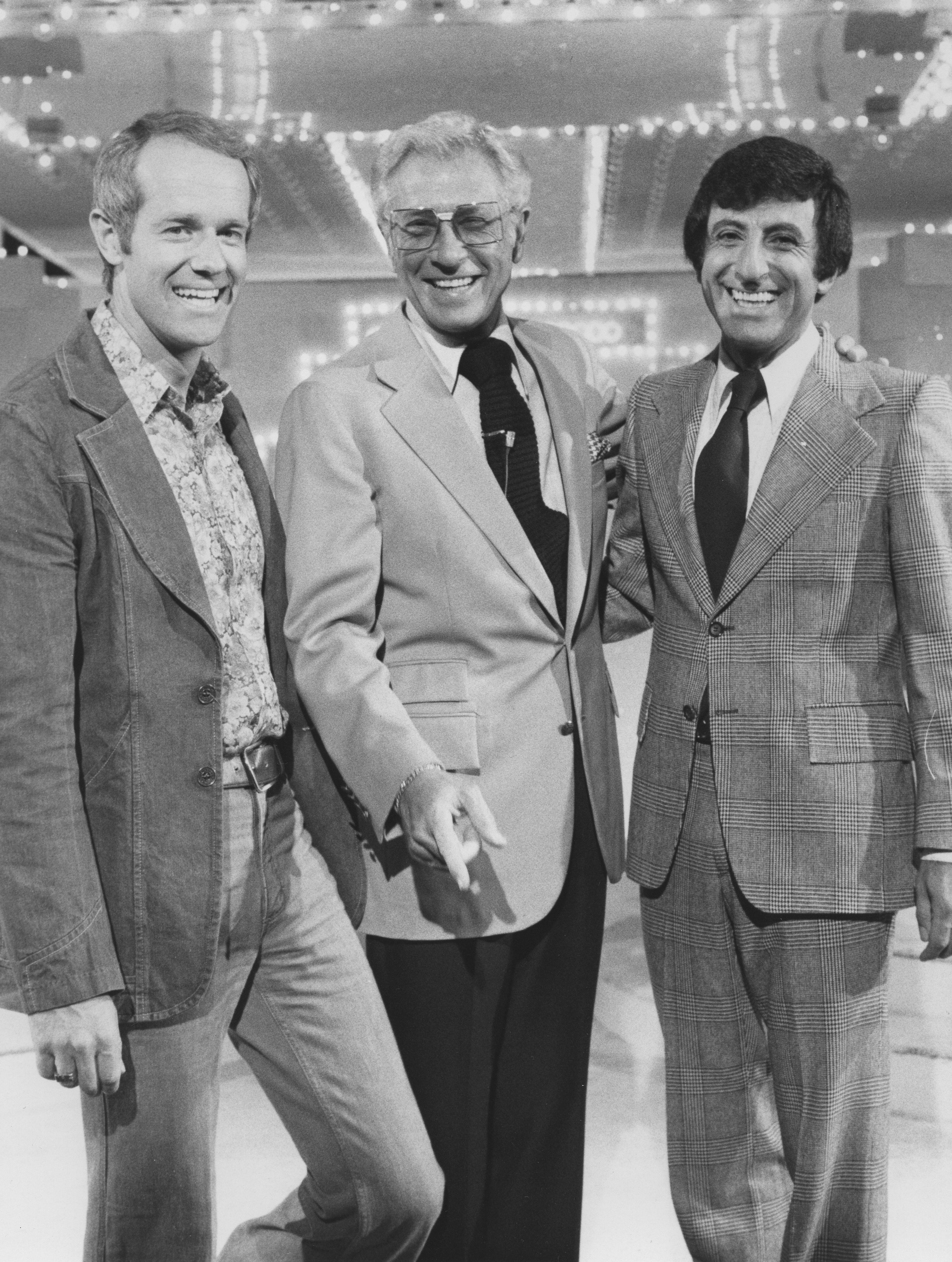
- Allen Ludden (center) with M*A*S*H stars Mike Farrell (left) and Jamie Farr (right).
- Created by: Bill Barr; Lin Bolen
- Directed by: Marty Pasetta; Jeff Goldstein
- Presented by: Allen Ludden
- Announcer: Bill Armstrong; Charlie O'Donnell
- Country of origin: United States
- No. of seasons: 1
- No. of episodes: 64

Production
- Executive producer: Lin Bolen
- Producer: Walt Case
- Running time: 26 minutes
- Production company: Lin Bolen Productions

Original release
- Network: NBC
- Release: October 4 – December 31, 1976

Stumpers! is a game show hosted by Allen Ludden that aired on NBC from October 4 to December 31, 1976. Lin Bolen, former head of NBC Daytime Programming, developed the show. Bill Armstrong was the program's regular announcer, with Charlie O'Donnell filling in for several episodes. The show featured game play similar to Password, with two teams (consisting of one celebrity and one contestant) attempting to guess the subject of puzzles based on clues provided by their opponents.

The series premiered and ended on the same dates as 50 Grand Slam, which immediately followed Stumpers! on the NBC schedule and was hosted by Tom Kennedy.

== Main game ==
Two rounds were played, with the objective being to solve a “stumper”—a puzzle consisting of three clues referring to a person, place, or thing. In the first round, each team member gave clues to their opposing counterpart (contestant to contestant, celebrity to celebrity). The clue-giver was shown the three clue words but not the answer, and selected the one they believed would be least helpful in identifying the stumper.

After each clue, the opposing player had five seconds to make as many guesses as possible. If they failed, a second and then a third clue could be given. A correct answer earned 15 points on the first clue, 10 on the second, and 5 on the third. If the stumper remained unsolved after all three clues, the clue-giver and their partner could score 15 points by answering it correctly.

The first round featured four stumpers, with each contestant and celebrity providing clues for one. In the second round, two stumpers were played with all point values doubled, and either member of the receiving team could respond after each clue. The team with the higher score at the end of the two rounds advanced to the Super Stumpers bonus round.

In the event of a tie, a final stumper was used as a tiebreaker. The host revealed clues one at a time, and any player could buzz in to answer. A correct response won the game, while an incorrect answer allowed the opposing team an opportunity to respond. If the stumper remained unsolved after three clues, a new one was introduced.

== Bonus round ("Super Stumpers") ==
The contestant had 60 seconds to solve 10 stumpers in a particular general category, based on clues given by the celebrity. The clues were displayed on a screen above the contestant's head, and the celebrity gave one at a time, trying to give the most helpful clues first. After hearing a clue, the contestant had to say "clue" in order to receive the next one; if the celebrity gave a clue without being thus prompted, the stumper was thrown out and the team forfeited their chance at the top prize. The contestant could offer multiple guesses, and could pass on a stumper and return to it after playing through all 10 if time permitted.

The contestant won $10,000 for guessing all 10 stumpers, or $100 per correct answer otherwise.

Two complete games were played per episode. Contestants could stay on the show until they were defeated or won Super Stumpers twice.

== Episode status ==
Due to NBC's practice of wiping, the status of the entire series is unknown. The premiere and finale exist, along with another episode from December 1976.
