= Allen Ludden's Gallery =

- Genre: Talk show
- Created by: Allen Ludden
- Presented by: Allen Ludden, Betty White, H. B. Barnum
- Theme music composer: H. B. Barnum
- Country of origin: United States
- Original language: English
- No. of seasons: 1
- No. of episodes: 60

Original release
- Network: Syndication
- Release: 1969 – 1969

Allen Ludden's Gallery is an American television talk show (1969) hosted by Allen Ludden. Sixty episodes were taped and syndicated to 22 markets. His co-hosts were his wife, actress Betty White, and musical director H. B. Barnum, "a black man, but he's not on this show as a token Negro. He's here because we have the right chemistry and he's talented and a good friend," Ludden told The Boston Herald Traveler. Ludden also said he hoped the show would attract younger viewers, but it proved to be a failure.
