= Blair Murdoch =

Canadian television producer

Blair Murdoch (born June 11, 1943) was a television producer during the mid-1980s to the mid-2000s. He independently produced many television series, mainly game shows, for Global Television Network in Canada and for MGM Television in Los Angeles. His work included Acting Crazy, The Next Line, The New Liar's Club, Kidstreet, Richard Deacon's Micro Magic, Celebrity Microwaves with Pete Barbutti, Men in Action, Love Me, Love Me Not, Fibi's Funny Bones, Money Court, Love Handles, An Evening with Casey Stengel and Sea Hunt. Many of Murdoch's shows were cast at the CKVU-TV studios in Vancouver, British Columbia. His other place of production was CFAC-TV in Calgary, Alberta.
