= Liar's Club =

American game show

- Created by: Ralph Andrews
- Presented by: Rod Serling; Bill Armstrong; Allen Ludden; Eric Boardman
- Announcer: Jim Isaics (1976–79); Bill Berry; Joe Seiter (closing logo only, 1976–79); Bill Armstrong (1988); Ted Friend (1969, 1989)
- Countries of origin: United States (1969–79); Canada (1988–89)

Production
- Executive producers: Ralph Andrews (1969–79); Blair Murdoch (1988–89)
- Producer: Larry Hovis (1976-79)
- Running time: approx. 26 Minutes
- Production companies: Ralph Andrews Productions (1969-1979); Northstar Productions (1988); Blair Murdoch Productions (1989)

Original release
- Network: Syndicated (United States, 1969, 1976–79); Global (Canada, 1988-89)
- Release: 1969 – 1989

Liar's Club was a television game show originally produced in America by Ralph Andrews, and later in Canada by producer Blair Murdoch. The show featured a panel of celebrity guests who offered explanations of obscure or unusual objects. Contestants attempted to determine which explanation was correct in order to win prizes.

Liar's Club was first seen during the 1969–70 season with Rod Serling as host, and returned for a three-season run from 1976 to 1979, after airing as a local series on Los Angeles' KTLA during the 1974–75 season. Bill Armstrong hosted the KTLA version, which aired on Saturday nights at 7:30 pm, and briefly hosted the program in syndication during the first season in 1976–77, but was soon replaced by Allen Ludden. Bill Berry and Joe Seiter shared the announcing duties. Celebrity attorney/actress/producer Vicki Roberts was a regular researcher on the show, and she herself brought in many of the strange or unusual objects on the show, many of which were found by scouring antique shops in the Los Angeles area. In 1978, Andrews sold the series to its producer, Golden West Television. In 1996, C3, a Comcast-backed firm acquired the property for a remake, intended to be hosted by Ed McMahon, but never materialized.

Another version of the show aired during the 1988–89 season as The New Liar's Club; Eric Boardman hosted the program, and former emcee Bill Armstrong originally served as announcer, but was later replaced by Ted Friend. This version was produced by Blair Murdoch at CKVU-TV in Vancouver, British Columbia.

== Game play ==
A panel of four celebrity guests was presented with an unusual object, and each panelist gave an explanation of its use; one was correct, while the other three were bluffing. Contestants then attempted to guess which panelist was providing the accurate description. Two contestants competed on the 1969 version, while the first season of the 70s version and the 1988 revival featured four contestants, and the two seasons (1977–79) with Ludden had three.

On the 1969 version, the contestant who made the most correct guesses during the episode won $100. For all later versions, contestants began the game with a set amount of money and made wagers before attempting to guess the correct object, which were then paid out at various odds if the contestant was successful.

From 1976 to 1977, contestants were spotted with $100 at the start of the game, and wagered up to $100 (in $10 increments) for each prediction. Correct predictions were paid out at odds of 1:1 in Round 1, 2:1 in Round 2, 5:1 in Round 3, and 10:1 in Round 4. When Ludden took over as host in 1977, the game format largely remained the same, but the maximum wager in each round was changed from $100 to half of the contestant's current bank. On the 1988–89 version, contestants played for points, wagering between 10 and 90 points in multiples of 10. For the first three rounds, contestants could bet no more than half their total; for the final round, they could bet up to 90 points or their entire score, whichever was lower.

Except from 1977 to 1979, the last round of the game featured artwork (or a very large device on occasion during the 1988-89 run) presented before the panel and contestants. Each celebrity would then offer his/her own title for the art, and contestants attempted to predict which title was correct. During the 1977–78 season, the final round consisted of each celebrity describing his/her own unusual item instead of just a single object or piece of art. During the last Ludden season, as a reversal in the rules of the first three rounds, contestants attempted in the final round to predict which of the four celebrities was lying in his/her description; the betting limit was removed for this round only.

The contestant with the highest score won the game and a bonus prize, with (from 1977 to 1989) an additional prize awarded to any contestant who made a correct prediction in all four rounds. If two or more contestants were tied at the end of the game, they were originally all awarded the prize. Starting early in the 1988-89 version, ties were broken first by the amount wagered in round four. Starting in 1989, if contestants were tied in that criterion, the winner was determined by the number of correct predictions during the game. If this did not break the tie, the contestants then revealed predictions each had made regarding their final score prior to the start of the game. The contestant with the prediction that was closest to his or her final score without going over was declared the winner.

== Panelists ==
Regular panelists on the Rod Serling version included Jonathan Harris and Betty White. Frequent panelists on the 1970s version included White (then Allen Ludden's wife), Joey Bishop, Dick Gautier, Fannie Flagg, David Letterman and Larry Hovis, who also produced this version.

Canadian television host and comedian John Barbour was a regular panelist throughout the 1980s version, and the three other panelists originally changed from week to week. Jimmie Walker, Shannon Tweed and Pete Barbutti later joined Barbour as permanent panelists.

== The Next Line ==
In 1991, a show titled The Next Line, hosted by Kevin Frank, was produced in Canada. The format had many similarities to The New Liar's Club: both shows were taped at the same studio, and featured similar gameplay elements. However, contestants instead attempted to predict which celebrity was providing the correct next line in a video clip or song. Like The New Liar's Club, the show was produced by Blair Murdoch and featured Pete Barbutti as a regular panelist.

== Music ==
During the Rod Serling series, stock music was used throughout the show. For the KTLA version, the Jack Shaindlin production music piece "Mad Square Rock" was used as its theme. When Liar's Club re-entered syndication in 1976, new music by Stan Worth was used. Gary Peterson composed the music for the 1988-89 version.

== Syndication and episode status ==
The 1969 Rod Serling series was syndicated through Metromedia Producers Corporation; all episodes of this version are lost except for two, one of which was included as an extra in a DVD collection of The Twilight Zone, and the other, episode 89, was posted on YouTube in 2012 by Matt Andrews (son of series creator Ralph Andrews).

The KTLA version, although videotaped, exists only in film transfers. Its complete episode status is unknown, although several episodes were part of a resyndication package of the Armstrong series in 1986 by Four Star International.

20th Century Fox Television handled daily syndication of the 1976 series through 1978, with Sandy Frank Television Distributors taking over for its final season. Although episodes of the Armstrong version aired in repeats on the USA Network from April 26, 1986, to June 26, 1987, its complete episode status remains unknown, as does the status of the Allen Ludden episodes (although a few examples of both are available for viewing on YouTube).

Four Star International syndicated The New Liar's Club in the U.S. during its 1988-89 season; all episodes exist and were first rerun in Canada on Prime during 1999-2000, then by Game TV from 2012 to 2015 and again since 2022.
