= 50 Grand Slam =

- Genre: Game show
- Created by: Ralph Andrews
- Directed by: Dick McDonough
- Presented by: Peter Haskell (pilot); Tom Kennedy
- Announcer: John Harlan
- Country of origin: United States
- No. of episodes: 64

Production
- Executive producer: Ralph Andrews
- Producer: George Vosburgh
- Running time: 30 minutes
- Production company: Ralph Andrews Productions

Original release
- Network: NBC
- Release: October 4 – December 31, 1976

50 Grand Slam is a game show from Ralph Andrews Productions that aired on NBC from October 4 to December 31, 1976. Tom Kennedy hosted the show (although Peter Haskell served as emcee for the unaired pilot), with John Harlan as the announcer.

It premiered and ended on the same day as the show that preceded it on the NBC schedule, Stumpers!, which was hosted by Allen Ludden, who appeared at the beginning of the premiere to wish Kennedy luck (Kennedy also appeared on the first episode of Stumpers! to wish Ludden luck). Name That Tune, also hosted by Kennedy, took over the time slot previously occupied by 50 Grand Slam on NBC the following Monday.

== Format ==
Eight contestants competed on each show, with two competing at a time. Contestants were selected and matched up based on a specific category or area of expertise; there was also a "general knowledge" category.

The two contestants, in turn, were read a (usually) four-part question in their category. The current champion, or the winner of a coin toss, decided whether to play first or second; while the first player heard the question and answered it, the second would be placed in an isolation booth. After the first contestant had answered, the isolated player was given the same question. Whoever answered more parts of the question correctly won (see below for the money scale), and had the option to either quit with the amount of money they'd just won, or face another opponent on the next episode with the risk of losing all the money if they failed. In the event of a tie, both contestants won money, but there was no option to stop playing; both were forced to continue. In order to actually win the money, however, the winner needed to answer at least two questions correctly, regardless of category.

Although primarily a quiz show, there were occasional digressions; for example, on the premiere episode two contestants playing in a golf category, in lieu of answering questions, were asked to make a specific shot on a miniature driving range that had been set up in the studio. Each player was given five balls, and the winner was the one who had made the most shots out of the five (with a minimum of two required to advance). Among the more conventional categories were General Knowledge and Shakespeare, while another focused on The Beatles. One contestant in this category, Steve Zisk, defeated all participants, including a well known writer for Rolling Stone magazine, only to eventually lose to the "house", whose odds he largely had been responsible for raising to 3 out of 3 correct responses.

| Win | Amount |
| First | $200 |
| Second | $500 |
| Third | $1,000 |
| Fourth | $2,000 |
| Fifth | $5,000 |
| Sixth | $10,000 |
| Seventh | $20,000 |
| Eighth | $50,000 |

With the exception of general knowledge, each category remained in play until all nine contestants had played it or someone won $50,000. During the brief run of 50 Grand Slam, a total of five contestants were able to achieve this feat.

== Episode status ==
The premiere and finale of 50 Grand Slam are known to exist as off-air recordings among collectors and traders of television game shows, while the pilot and an episode with a $50,000 win also survive. The status of the remaining episodes is unknown, due to NBC's then-standard practice of wiping its daytime series.
