= Desilu =

American production company

Coordinates: 34.089777°N 118.334722°W

Desilu Productions, Inc.
- Type: Subsidiary
- Industry: Television production
- Founded: 1950; 76 years ago
- Founders: Desi Arnaz; Lucille Ball
- Defunct: December 29, 1967; 58 years ago
- Fate: Purchased by Gulf+Western and amalgamated into Paramount Television
- Successors: Paramount Television (first incarnation); CBS Studios; Paramount Television Studios; Lucille Ball Productions; Desilu Too; Desilu Corporation
- Headquarters: Los Angeles, California, United States
- Parent: Desilu Corporation

Desilu Productions, Inc. (/ˈdɛsiluː/) was an American television production company founded and co-owned by husband and wife Desi Arnaz and Lucille Ball. The company is best known for shows such as I Love Lucy, The Lucy Show, Mannix, The Untouchables, Mission: Impossible and Star Trek. Until 1962, Desilu was the second-largest independent television production company in the United States, trailing only MCA's Revue Studios. However, MCA acquired Universal Pictures, transforming Desilu into the undisputed number-one independent production company. This status remained unchallenged until Ball sold Desilu to Gulf and Western Industries, which was then the parent company of Paramount Pictures, in 1968.

Ball and Arnaz jointly owned the majority stake in Desilu from its inception until 1962, when Ball bought out Arnaz and ran the company by herself for several years. Ball had succeeded in making Desilu profitable again by 1968, when she sold her shares of Desilu to Gulf+Western for $17 million (valued at $164 million in 2025). Gulf+Western then transformed Desilu into the television production arm of Paramount Pictures, rebranding the company as the original Paramount Television.

Desilu's entire library is owned by Skydance Corporation through two of its subsidiaries. The CBS unit owns all Desilu properties that were produced and concluded before 1960, which were sold to CBS by Desilu itself. Its CBS Studios unit owns the rights to everything Desilu produced after 1960 as successor in interest to Paramount Television.

There is a street named after Desilu in San Antonio, Texas.

== History ==
Desilu Productions was founded in 1950 using the combined names of the husband-and-wife production team of "Desi Arnaz" and "Lucille Ball". It was created to produce Lucy and Desi's vaudeville act as a television series and sell it to Columbia Broadcasting System (CBS) executives. Arnaz and Ball wanted to adapt Ball's CBS radio series My Favorite Husband to television. The television project eventually became I Love Lucy. (Desilu also produced the TV version of My Favorite Husband.) During the show's first few years, Desilu rented space at General Service Studios (now the Sunset Las Palmas Studios) at Santa Monica Boulevard and North Las Palmas Avenue. They used Stage Two, which was named Desilu Playhouse. Later, a special entrance was added at 6633 Romaine Street, on the south side of the lot, to allow direct access to it.

=== Ball's role in the company ===
Ball approved original production concepts (such as The Untouchables and Star Trek) for development into broadcast series. This created continuous revenue streams from the programs through reruns, which were necessary to recover their high development and production costs. Even decades after the absorption of Desilu Productions and the production end of all original series Desilu approved for development, some series have achieved enduring success and, in some cases, redevelopment into feature-length movie franchises in their own right. Examples are The Untouchables, Star Trek and Mission Impossible.

=== Arnaz's role in the company ===
Much of Desilu Productions' early success can be traced to Arnaz's unusual business style in his role as producer of I Love Lucy. For example, lacking formal business training, he knew nothing of amortization and often included all the costs incurred by the production into the first episode of a season rather than spreading them across the projected number of episodes in the year. As a result, by the end of the season, episodes were nearly entirely paid for, at preposterously low figures.

At that time, most television programs were broadcast live, and as the largest markets were in New York, the rest of the country received only images derived from kinescopes. Karl Freund, the cameraman on I Love Lucy, and Arnaz himself have been credited with the development of the linked multifilm camera setup using adjacent sets in front of a live audience that became the standard production method for situation comedy. The use of film enabled every station around the country to broadcast high-quality images of the show. Arnaz was told it was impossible to allow an audience onto a sound stage, but he worked with Freund to design sets that accommodated audiences, allowed filming, and adhered to fire, health, and safety codes.

Network executives considered the use of film an unnecessary extravagance. Arnaz persuaded them to allow Desilu to cover all additional costs associated with filming, rather than broadcasting live, under the stipulation that Desilu owned and controlled all rights to the film prints and negatives. Arnaz's unprecedented arrangement is widely considered to be one of the shrewdest deals in television history. As a result of his foresight, Desilu reaped the profits from all reruns of the series.

=== Early years ===
Desilu soon outgrew its first space and in 1954 bought its own studio, the Motion Picture Center on Cahuenga Boulevard in Hollywood, what is now Red Studios Hollywood. Most of the I Love Lucy episodes were produced there.

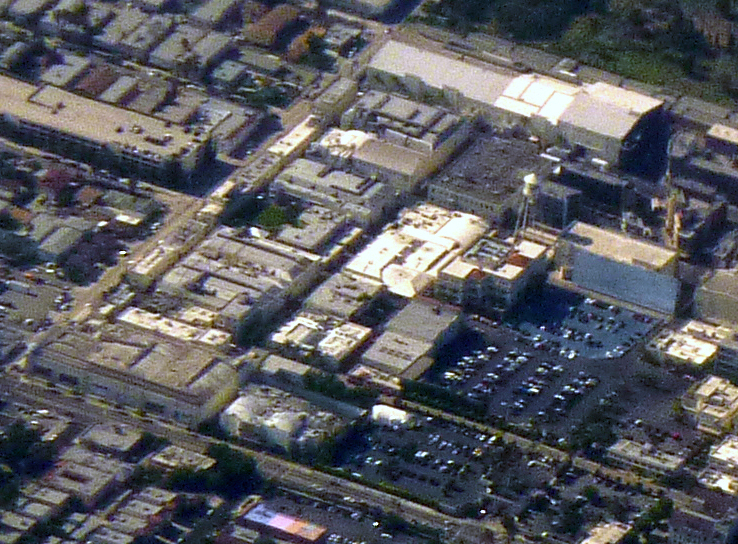
Former Desilu Studios area in 2009

In late 1957, the company bought the RKO Pictures production facilities for $6 million from General Tire and Rubber, including RKO's main facilities on Gower Street in Hollywood and the RKO-Pathé lot (now Culver Studios) in Culver City. This purchase included Forty Acres, the backlot where exteriors for Mayberry were filmed. These acquisitions gave the Ball-Arnaz TV empire a total of 33 sound stages — four more than Metro-Goldwyn-Mayer and eleven more than Twentieth Century-Fox had in 1957.

The studio's initial attempt to become involved in film production was the film Forever, Darling (1956), Arnaz and Ball's followup to their highly successful MGM release The Long, Long Trailer (1954), but it was a box-office failure. It was produced at Desilu, but under the banner of Zanra Productions (Arnaz spelled backward). Most subsequent attempts to bring projects to the big screen were aborted until Yours, Mine and Ours (1968) with Ball and Henry Fonda. This film was a critical and financial success.

In 1960, Desi Arnaz sold the pre-1960s shows to CBS. Desilu Productions retained ownership of those shows that premiered after 1960, and were still in production.

=== Ball as sole owner ===
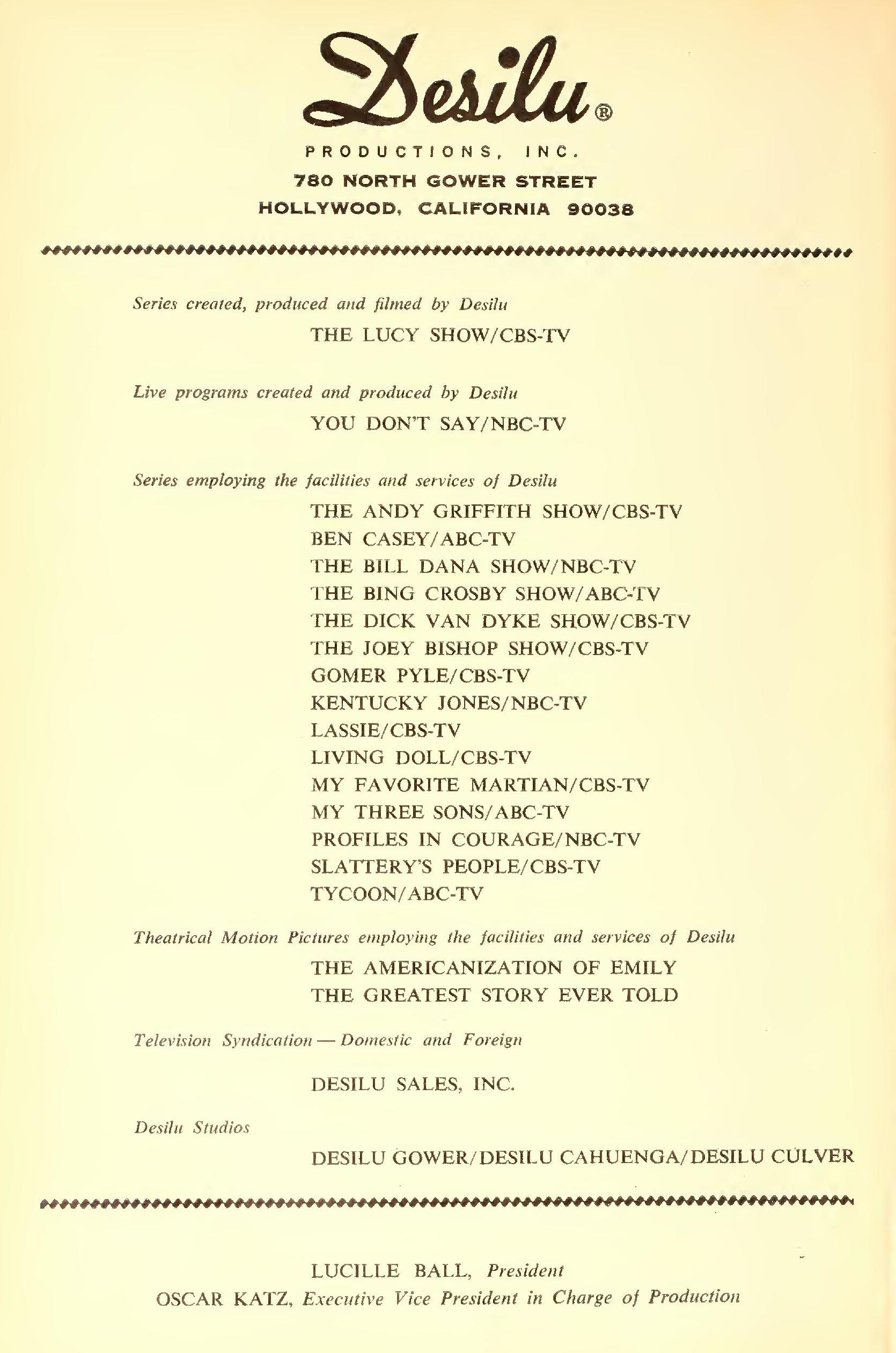
"Desilu Productions, Inc." ad with Lucille Ball as President in the Radio Annual and Television Year Book, 1964

Ball and Arnaz divorced in 1960. In 1961, the company entered into an alliance with producers Ralph Andrews and Bill Yageman, where they developed game show formats for Desilu for produce, notably the game show You Don't Say! and unscripted shows, the partnership broke out in 1964 and became an independent entity. In November 1962, Arnaz resigned as president when his holdings in the company were bought out by Ball, who succeeded him as president. Ball served as president and chief executive officer of Desilu while at the same time starring in her own weekly series. This made her the first woman to head a major studio and one of the most powerful women in Hollywood at the time. Ball founded Desilu Sales, Inc., for syndication which distributed Jay Ward Productions' Fractured Flickers in 1964. Today, Desilu Sales is part of CBS Media Ventures (formerly CBS Television Distribution).

During Ball's time as sole owner, Desilu developed popular series such as Mission: Impossible (1966), Mannix (1967), and Star Trek (1966). It has been falsely rumored that a Desilu loss during this time was Carol Burnett, who declined to star in a sitcom for the studio in favor of The Carol Burnett Show, a weekly variety show that lasted 11 seasons. In truth, Here's Agnes was offered to Burnett by CBS executives who attempted to dissuade her from having a variety show because they felt that men were better suited for them. Burnett and Ball, however, remained close friends, often guest-starring in each other's series.

In 1967, Ball agreed to sell her television company to Gulf+Western, which had only recently acquired Paramount Pictures. The company was renamed Paramount Television, and the former RKO main lot on Gower Street was absorbed into the adjacent Paramount lot. The old RKO globe logo is still in place. The company is now called CBS Studios (formerly CBS Television Studios). Perfect Film purchased Desilu Studios' other lot in Culver City in 1968.

=== Independent Arnaz ===
Arnaz left television production for a few years but returned in 1966 when he formed his own company, Desi Arnaz Productions, based at Desilu. Desi Arnaz Productions, along with United Artists Television, co-produced The Mothers-in-Law for the National Broadcasting Company (NBC). Arnaz attempted to sell other television pilots, including a comedy with Carol Channing and an adventure series with Rory Calhoun. Neither series sold. Arnaz also tried to create a law drama called Without Consent, with Spencer Tracy as a defense attorney, but after several attempts at developing a suitable script failed and because of insurance concerns regarding Tracy's heavy drinking, the project was abandoned.

=== Independent Ball and Desilu Too ===
After selling Desilu, Ball established her own new production company, Lucille Ball Productions (LBP), in 1968. The company went to work on her new series Here's Lucy that year. The program ran until 1974 and enjoyed several years of ratings success. Ball returned to network television in 1986 with the short-lived Life with Lucy. It lasted eight episodes before it was cancelled—a first for Ball—because of poor ratings. LBP continues to exist, and its primary purpose is residual sales of license rights for Here's Lucy.

Desilu-Paramount TV's holdings are owned by Paramount Skydance (formerly ViacomCBS and Paramount Global), the owner of the pre-1960s shows. Desilu Productions Inc. was reincorporated in Delaware in 1967, by Paramount Pictures and still exists as a legal entity. Desilu Too LLC was later created by Lucie Arnaz mostly as a licensee for I Love Lucy-related merchandise. Desilu Too also partners with MPI Home Video and Lucille Ball Productions (formed by Ball and second husband Gary Morton) on the video releases of Here's Lucy and other material Ball and Arnaz made independently of each other. Desilu Too officials have worked with MPI Home Video for the home video reissue of The Mothers-In-Law. Paramount Home Entertainment (through CBS DVD) continues to hold DVD distribution rights to the CBS library. In November 2019, CBS Studios registered the DESILU trademark again to protect its previous Common Law trademark usage. Syndication rights for Here's Lucy were sold by Ball to Telepictures, which later merged with Lorimar Television and ultimately was folded into Warner Bros. Television. Warner Bros. Television is the show's current distributor, although MPI now holds home video rights under license from Lucille Ball Productions and Desilu Too.

== Technological innovations ==
Desilu began the creation of productions using conventional film studio materials, production, and processing techniques. The use of these materials and techniques meant that the 35 mm negatives (the source material for copyright purposes) were immediately available for production and distribution of prints when the Lucy series went into syndication at local stations around the country. As such, no "lost" episodes of programs occurred, and no programs were recorded by kinescope from the television broadcast.

Through the use of film-studio production techniques, the content and quality of Desilu productions displayed a high standard relative to peers in television of the 1950s and '60s. Moreover, they were readily adaptable to both comedy and drama formats and were able to handle special effects or feature interior or exterior sets and locations with equal ease.

== Television shows produced by or filmed at Desilu ==
=== Produced by Desilu ===
Title	Genre	Years	Network	Notes
I Love Lucy	Sitcom	1951–57	CBS	distributed by CBS Television Film Sales
Our Miss Brooks	Sitcom	1952–56	CBS	distributed by CBS Television Film Sales
Willy	Sitcom	1954–55	CBS	
Shower of Stars	Variety	1954–58	CBS	
December Bride	Sitcom	1954–59	CBS	distributed by CBS Television Film Sales (renamed CBS Films in 1958)
The Life and Legend of Wyatt Earp	Western	1955–61	ABC	co-production with Wyatt Earp Enterprises
The Adventures of Jim Bowie	Western	1956–58	ABC	co-production with Jim Bowie Enterprises
The Sheriff of Cochise	Western	1956–60	Syndication	co-production with National Telefilm Associates
Whirlybirds	Adventure	1957–60	Syndication	distributed by CBS Films/Viacom
Official Detective	Anthology	1957–58	Syndication	co-production with National Telefilm Associates
The Walter Winchell File	Anthology	1957–58	ABC	co-production with National Telefilm Associates
The Lucy–Desi Comedy Hour	Variety	1957–60	CBS	distributed by CBS Television Film Sales (renamed CBS Films in 1958)
The Texan	Western	1958–60	CBS	co-production with Rorvic Productions
Westinghouse Desilu Playhouse	Anthology	1958–60	CBS	
The Ann Sothern Show	Sitcom	1958–61	CBS	co-production with Anso Productions currently owned by 20th Television
This Is Alice	Sitcom	1958–59	NTA Film Network	co-production with National Telefilm Associates
The Untouchables	Police drama	1959–63	ABC	co-production with Langford Productions Inc.
Guestward, Ho!	Sitcom	1960–61	ABC	
Angel	Sitcom	1960–61	CBS	co-production with Burlingame Productions and CBS Films
Harrigan and Son	Sitcom	1960–61	ABC	
Fair Exchange	Sitcom	1962–1963	CBS	co-production with Cy Howard Productions
The Lucy Show	Sitcom	1962–68	CBS	Desilu produced up to its sale to Gulf+Western (during season six)
You Don't Say!	Game show	1963–69	NBC	co-production with Ralph Andrews-Bill Yagemann Productions; Desilu produced up to its sale to Gulf+Western (during season five)
The Greatest Show on Earth	Drama	1963–64	ABC	co-production with Ringling Bros., Barnum and Bailey Television, and Cody Productions
Glynis	Sitcom	1963	CBS	
Star Trek	Science fiction	1966–68	NBC	co-production with Norway Corporation; Desilu produced up to its sale to Gulf+Western (during season two)
Mission: Impossible	Secret agent drama	1966–68	CBS	Desilu produced up to its sale to Gulf+Western (during season two)
Mannix	Crime drama	1967–68	CBS	Desilu produced up to its sale to Gulf+Western (during season one)

=== Filmed at Desilu ===
Some of these programs were created and owned by Desilu; others were other production companies' programs that Desilu filmed or to which Desilu rented production space.

- The Jack Benny Program (CBS; 1950–1964 / NBC; 1964–1965)
- Make Room for Daddy/The Danny Thomas Show (ABC; 1953–1957 / CBS; 1957–1964)
- Private Secretary (CBS; 1953–1957)
- The Lineup (CBS; 1954–1960)
- The Adventures of Jim Bowie (ABC; 1956–1958)
- Wire Service (ABC; 1956–1957)
- Meet McGraw (NBC; 1957–1958)
- The Eve Arden Show (CBS; 1957–1958)
- The Real McCoys (ABC; 1957–1962 / CBS; 1962–1963)
- Man with a Camera (ABC; 1958–1960)
- Yancy Derringer (CBS; 1958–1959)
- The Andy Griffith Show (CBS; 1960–1968)
- The Barbara Stanwyck Show (NBC; 1960–1961)
- Here's Hollywood (NBC; 1960–1962)
- Harrigan and Son (ABC; 1960–1961)
- My Three Sons (ABC; 1960–1965 / CBS; 1965–1972)
- The Joey Bishop Show (NBC; 1961–1964 / CBS; 1964–1965)
- The Dick Van Dyke Show (CBS; 1961–1966)
- My Favorite Martian (CBS; 1963–1966)
- The Bill Dana Show (NBC; 1963–1965)
- The Bing Crosby Show (ABC; 1964–1965)
- My Living Doll (CBS; 1964–1965)
- Slattery's People (CBS; 1964–1965)
- Gomer Pyle, U.S.M.C. (CBS; 1964–1969)
- I Spy (NBC; 1965–1968)
- Hogan's Heroes (CBS; 1965–1971)
- Family Affair (CBS; 1966–1971)
- That Girl (ABC; 1966–1971)
- The Guns of Will Sonnett (ABC; 1967–1969)
- Rango (ABC; 1967)
- Accidental Family (NBC; 1967–1968)
- The Mothers-in-Law (NBC; 1967–1969)
- Good Morning World (CBS; 1967–1968)
