= Love Handles (game show) =

Canadian television game show

Love Handles is a Canadian television game show produced by Blair Murdoch from 1996 to 1998 on the Global Television Network, and hosted by Stu Jeffries. The show's announcer was David Kaye.

The series had the same premise as the United States show The Newlywed Game: Three married couples or mates competed, including occasional same gender couples, to determine which couple knew each other the best. Like many of Murdoch's shows, Love Handles was taped at U.TV in Vancouver, British Columbia without a studio audience. The set had each team sitting on a love seat.

Many episodes of Love Handles were rerun from 1999 to 2002 on Prime, and were later seen on GameTV, beginning in 2007. Episodes featuring same sex couples were also re-aired on OutTV (formerly PrideVision TV), while episodes can also be seen on the Canadian game show streaming service BonusRound.

== Gameplay ==
=== Rounds 1 and 2 ===
For the first round, one member of each team was offstage in a soundproof room. The three remaining players were asked questions about themselves or their partners. The first player to buzz in after a question was read answered first, then the other two answered. If players buzzed in before the question was completed, they had to answer without hearing the rest of the question or any multiple choice options, if there were any. Three questions were asked in this manner.

When the partners returned, they had to match answers. Each match was worth five points, except for the team whose partner rang in first, which earned a seven-point bonus if they matched. The second round was played identically, with the partners switching roles. Each match was worth 10 points, with the bonus still worth an additional seven.

On some episodes, the first player's answer was shown to the viewers as a lower third graphic while the partner made a guess. In either case, the first player simply told the partner what the initial response was.

=== Rounds 3 and 4 ===
The host showed a written word to one member of a couple; that person then had to come up with a verbal question or clue which allowed the second member to say the exact word (synonyms were not accepted). The guessing partner had to push a buzzer to respond. This was repeated with a different word for each couple. However, until the guessing partner sounded the buzzer, the guessing partners from the other two teams could say "steal" and try to respond themselves. If the team giving the clue answered correctly, they earned 25 points; a steal was worth 15.

The fourth round was played the same, with the partners again switching roles. The teams were encouraged to come up with personalized clues to keep the other teams from recognizing the word.

== Prize ==
The team with the most points at the end of the game won a vacation. If the team played a perfect game, including stealing all four of their opponent's words in rounds three and four, they also received a bond worth $100,000 at maturity. In the event of a tie, the Newlywed Game tiebreaker determined the winner.
