= It Takes Two (game show) =

- Created by: Ralph Andrews
- Presented by: Vin Scully; Dick Clark
- Announcer: John Harlan; Burton Richardson
- Country of origin: United States
- No. of episodes: 345 (1969–1970); 60 (1997)

Production
- Running time: 30 minutes
- Production companies: Ralph Andrews Productions (1969–1970); Mark Phillips Philms & Telephision (1997); MTM Enterprises (1997)

Original release
- Network: NBC
- Release: March 31, 1969 – July 31, 1970
- Network: The Family Channel
- Release: March 10 – May 30, 1997

It Takes Two is a game show in which contestants gave numerical answers to questions (which usually entail stunts and/or demonstrations). The original program was created and produced by Ralph Andrews and aired on NBC from March 31, 1969, to July 31, 1970, at 10:00 AM Eastern. A second version, produced by Mark Phillips Philms & Telephision, aired on The Family Channel (now Freeform) in 1997.

Vin Scully hosted the NBC version with John Harlan as announcer and on-camera assistant. The Family Channel version was hosted by Dick Clark.

== Gameplay ==
=== NBC ===
Three celebrity couples competed in this version. For each question, both spouses of each celebrity couple gave individual numerical answers which were averaged into their combined answer. After the celebrity couples gave their answers, a studio audience member guessed which couple was the closest. A correct answer won $100 for the audience member. By the fall of 1969, each win awarded a prize instead of cash. In 1970, audience members who won four prizes in a row also won a new car.

=== The Family Channel ===
Gameplay remained similar in this version with three teams each with two civilian contestants competing. Once again, both contestants on each team gave individual numerical answers to make one averaged answer. However, each question was worth money for the team who was the closest, and the second-closest team won a smaller amount of money.

Round	Closest team	Second-closest team
Question #1	$100	$75
Question #2	$200	$100
Question #3	$300	$150
Question #4	$400	$200
Question #5	$1,000	$500

The second-place prize for question one was originally $50. If a two-way tie occurred, both teams received the first or second place money. If a three-way tie occurred, all three teams received the first-place money. If at any point a team member gave an exact answer they also won a prize in addition to the first place money.

The team with the most money won the game, kept their cash, received bonus prizes and played one last question called the "Brainteaser". If two or all three teams tied for the lead they all played the "Brainteaser".

==== Bonus round (Brainteaser) ====
A question based upon an act or demonstration that was already used during the show was presented to the team and each member gave a verbal response. If the correct answer was within a predetermined range based upon the team's response, the team won a grand prize (usually a trip).

The winning range varied between episodes. At times the correct answer had to be within twenty high or low of their averaged guess. At other times the winning range had to be within the two individual guesses or within a different varied range.

==== Guests ====
Many episodes featured a guest celebrity that came on to either perform a task related to a question or for a question related to their work.

- Vicki Lawrence appeared on the premiere for a question on ironing.
- Christina Ferrare and Michael Burger of Home & Family appeared on the second episode for a question about Ferrare's modeling career.
- Ed McMahon, Clark's co-host on TV's Bloopers & Practical Jokes came by on the third episode for two questions: one was related to his role as Johnny Carson's sidekick, and the other was for his American Family Publishers sweepstakes.
- Rod Roddy and Janice Pennington of The Price Is Right appeared during the second week for one of the questions as well as the "Brainteaser".
- Betty White appeared for a question in the second week of the series.
- Ruta Lee of High Rollers fame stopped by to roll dice for one question based on the number of times she would be able to roll sevens or elevens during the remainder of the episode.
- Ron Pearson from Shopping Spree appeared on an episode to juggle for one of the questions.
- Bowzer from Sha Na Na appeared on an episode to play piano for two questions
- Audrey and Judy Landers appeared on an episode for a question about trees

== Broadcast history ==
=== NBC ===
The original series replaced the Ed McMahon game show Snap Judgment and ran against reruns of The Lucy Show on CBS. Some NBC affiliates tape-delayed or preempted the show in favor of local homemaker's shows or syndicated programming, although the series ran over a full year due to its popularity. On Monday, August 3, 1970, the show was replaced by Dinah's Place, a women's talk/variety/homemaker's half-hour hosted by entertainer Dinah Shore.

=== The Family Channel ===
The revival ran on The Family Channel from March 10 to May 30, 1997, and was hosted by Dick Clark (who appeared on the NBC series with his wife) with Burton Richardson announcing.

The series was produced by Mark Phillips Philms & Telephision (who had the rights to the Ralph Andrews library) with Phillips serving as Executive Producer. Rich de Michele was producer while Gary Jonke was the writer and was also the last game show to premiere under The Family Channel until the network became FOX Family Channel in August 1998.
