= I'll Bet =

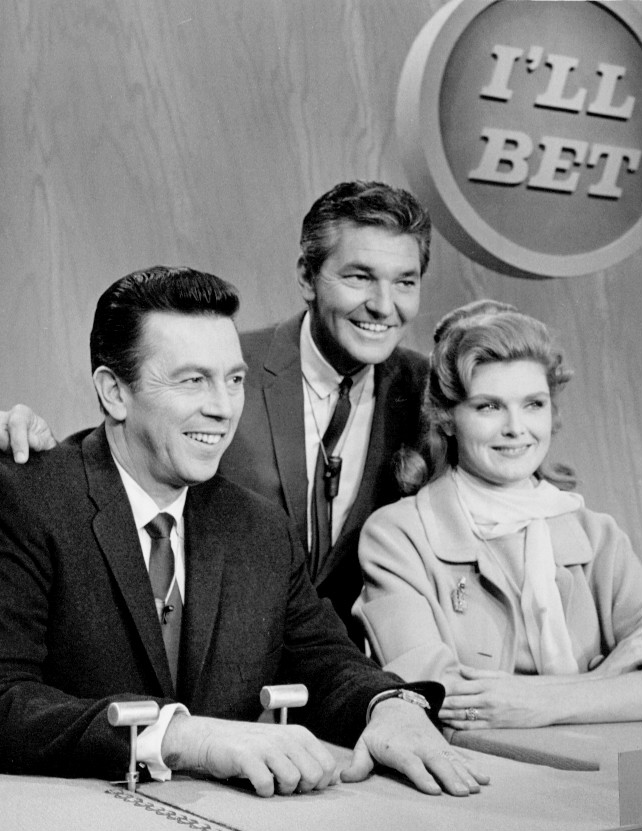
- Jack Narz with celebrity couple Patricia Blair and Martin Colbert
- Created by: Ralph Andrews
- Directed by: Dick McDonough
- Presented by: Jack Narz
- Country of origin: United States

Production
- Executive producers: Ralph Andrews; Bill Yagemann
- Running time: 22 minutes
- Production company: Ralph Andrews-Bill Yagemann Productions

Original release
- Network: NBC
- Release: March 29 – September 24, 1965

I'll Bet is an American game show that ran on NBC from March 29 to September 24, 1965. The series was created by Ralph Andrews, and hosted by Jack Narz. The series was a precursor to It's Your Bet.

The series originated on KTLA, but adapted into a national series on NBC, replacing reruns of Make Room for Daddy on the daytime lineup, in a schedule switch with Truth or Consequences. It was cancelled in mid 1965, replacing it in the timeslot with Let's Play Post Office.

== Gameplay ==
Two celebrity couples played. Before taping, one member of each couple drew a name of whom they were playing for, but only the TV station of where that person watches the show was revealed until the end.

A separating wall first divided the couple so they could not see what the other bet. One half of the couple (starting with the wife) was told a question through an earpiece. Afterward, he/she made a bet (from $10–$100) on whether their partner would answer the question right or wrong (a lever was pulled which either lit up the phrase "CAN" or "CAN'T").

Narz then read the question to the other half of the couple. The amount of dollars won or lost depended on the bet and the number of dollars risked. After this, the other couple (again, starting with the wife) went through the same process; the men then took their turns at hearing the question, and so on.

A couple won either by scoring $200 themselves, or if their opponents lost $200 (shown as -200).

== Episode status ==
I'll Bet is presumed to have been wiped, much like all NBC daytime shows of the period. One episode, with guest stars Richard Long, his wife actress Mara Corday and fellow actress Beverly Garland, circulates among collectors as a black-and-white kinescope. A color episode from September 6, featuring Denise Darcel and Robert Culp, was discovered in February 2009.
