= Wordplay (game show) =

- Logo
- Genre: Game show
- Presented by: Tom Kennedy
- Announcer: Charlie O'Donnell
- Theme music composer: David Reilly & John Devereaux (Pilot theme); Level 22/Joel Jaffe (Series theme)
- Opening theme: Hitting Home (Pilot theme)
- No. of episodes: 176

Production
- Production locations: NBC Studios; Burbank, California
- Running time: 22 minutes
- Production companies: Fiedler-Berlin Productions; Rick Ambrose Television; Scotti Bros.-Syd Vinnedge Television

Original release
- Network: NBC
- Release: December 29, 1986 – September 4, 1987

Wordplay is an American game show which ran on NBC from December 29, 1986 to September 4, 1987. It was hosted by Tom Kennedy (with Jamie Farr substituting for one week) and announced by Charlie O'Donnell. The show was produced by Scotti Bros.-Syd Vinnedge Television in association with Fiedler/Berlin Productions and Rick Ambrose Television. The show features a panel of three celebrity guests providing possible definitions of unusual words to two contestants, who must then determine which celebrity's definition for a word is the correct one.

== Main game ==
Two contestants, one usually a returning champion, competed for cash by guessing the definitions of unusual words found in the dictionary. The game was played on a computer-generated board with nine words arranged in a 3x3 grid; the middle column was shifted one level above the outer ones. The contestant in control chose a word, and each member of the celebrity panel provided a possible definition of the word along with a humorous anecdote (panelists were provided with the actual definitions of all nine words before the show.). If the contestant chose the correct definition, he/she scored the money associated with that word, but an incorrect choice gave his/her opponent a free chance to steal that money with a correct guess from one of the two remaining definitions.

The game was played in three rounds, with two words played per round (one word per player). The champion (or the contestant on the left if there were two new contestants) played first in round one, the challenger in round two, and the trailing contestant (or, in case of a tie, the left contestant) in round three. Words were worth $25, $50, or $75 in round one; these values were doubled in round two and again in round three. Each word on the board was vertically and horizontally connected to its immediate neighbor(s), and the cash value of each word was only revealed if a contestant correctly guessed its definition. Doing so not only scored the money associated with that word, but also the total of all the cash amounts connected to it. For example, a $75 word connected to an already-defined $50 word would award $125 to the contestant who won it ($75 + $50). If a $150 word connected to either of these two values was guessed in a later round, it would award $275 ($150 + $75 + $50). If both contestants missed the same word, it was covered with a block and all connections to it were broken.

One word per episode was designated as the day's bonus word. A contestant who chose this word and correctly guessed its definition won a bonus prize.

The contestant in the lead at the end of round three won the game, and advanced to the Double Definitions round. If the game ended in a tie, a seventh word was played, selected by the champion (or the contestant on the left). Each celebrity gave a brief definition with no anecdote, and the champion had the option to either play the word or pass it to the challenger. A correct guess won the game while an incorrect guess gave the opponent the game. Both players kept their money and bonus prizes.

== Double Definitions ==
The champion played the Double Definitions round for a progressive cash jackpot which started at $5,000 and increased by $2,500 each day it was not won. The Double Definitions game board consisted of 24 connected numbered squares arranged in a 6x4 grid, and behind each square were two definitions for one word (ex: "Writing Implement/Animal Enclosure" for the word "pen"). To win the jackpot, the champion had to complete a connected path of squares from left to right within 45 seconds (à la Blockbusters' Gold Rush/Gold Run bonus round) by selecting one square at a time and correctly guessing the word for each square. A green dollar sign appeared in a square if its word was guessed correctly, but if the champion passed on a word, its square was blocked and he/she had to work their way around it by selecting another square. Multiple guesses were allowed on any square without penalty; however, the champion could only move to another square by correctly guessing the word or passing on it.

Contestants who failed to make the proper connection in time won $100 for every word they got right. The highest jackpot ever won in the Double Definitions round was $27,500, which occurred during Wordplay's final week.

On the series premiere, the bonus round was called "Speedword", but from the second episode onward, it was called "Double Definitions" after the show's producers realized that fellow NBC game show Scrabble had been using the term for more than two years at the time.

Contestants were allowed to keep playing until they were defeated or until they won three episodes in a row, whichever happened first; three-time champions were retired undefeated.

== Broadcast history ==
When Wordplay premiered on December 29, 1986, it was slotted in the 12:30 pm/11:30 am timeslot following Super Password. That slot had been occupied by the soap opera Search for Tomorrow for over four and a half years on NBC; the serial had aired continuously, first on CBS, since 1951 and was the longest running daytime program in history at the time of its cancellation.

The series faced off against the first half-hour of the highly-rated The Young and the Restless on CBS and Loving on ABC, but did not perform well against both soap operas; the show was also prone to being preempted by some NBC affiliates, in order to continue to broadcast syndicated programming in its timeslot. NBC announced the cancellation of Wordplay in the summer of 1987 in order to make room for Win, Lose or Draw on the network's schedule; the final episode of the series aired on September 4, 1987. Three days after the final episode aired, Scrabble was moved to the 12:30 pm Eastern timeslot.

The series would be the last one hosted by Tom Kennedy. He was attached to a couple of game show pilots in 1988 and 1989, but none of them got off the ground, and he officially retired by the end of 1989.

=== Pilot episode ===
The pilot episode, shot in October 1986 for NBC, featured Peter Tomarken as host. According to Tomarken, he was replaced as host because the producers wanted him to alter the style in which he hosted, which created a negative reaction from test audiences. This episode presented the main-game board in a different format, with nine words and three blocks arranged in a 4-by-3 rectangular grid.

=== Episode Status ===
The show is believed to be fully intact, as NBC stopped the practice of wiping by this point, but it has never been seen in reruns.
