= You Don't Say! =

American television game show

- Created by: Ralph Andrews; Bill Yagemann
- Presented by: Jack Barry; Tom Kennedy; Clark Race; Jim Peck
- Announcer: Jay Stewart; John Harlan
- Country of origin: United States
- No. of episodes: 103 (ABC; 1975)

Production
- Running time: 22–26 minutes
- Production companies: Ralph Andrews-Bill Yagemann Productions (1962-1967); Ralph Andrews Productions (1967-1969); Desilu Productions (1963–1967); Paramount Television (1968–1969); Warner Bros. Television (1975)

Original release
- Network: KTLA (1962–1963, 1975); NBC (1963–1969); ABC (1975); Syndicated (daily, 1978–1979)
- Release: November 25, 1962 – March 22, 1963; April 1, 1963 – September 26, 1969; April 27, 1975 – June 29, 1975; July 7, 1975 – November 26, 1975; September 18, 1978 – March 1979

You Don't Say! is an American television game show. Two teams competed to guess the names of famous people and places, by using verbal clues that hinted at similar-sounding words. The first version aired on NBC daytime from April 1, 1963, to September 26, 1969, with revivals on ABC in 1975 and in syndication from 1978 to 1979. The last two incarnations were executive produced by Ralph Andrews and produced (with Gary Hunt) and directed by Bill Carruthers.

NBC broadcasts were produced by Ralph Andrews-Bill Yagemann Productions (later Ralph Andrews Productions) in association with Desilu Productions (later Paramount Television). Ralph Andrews Productions produced both of the 1970s versions, with the ABC series produced in association with the Carruthers Company and Warner Bros. Television and the syndicated series produced in association with Viacom Enterprises.

Tom Kennedy hosted the original You Don't Say! and the 1975 revival while Jim Peck hosted the 1978 series. John Harlan was the announcer for almost the entire run of the series in its various incarnations, except for part of 1963 when Jay Stewart announced.

Similar to the announcer's function on Password, either Stewart or Harlan would whisper the name being guessed, along with a description.

== Gameplay ==
=== NBC ===
Two teams competed, each composed of a celebrity and a contestant. The object was to convey the name of a famous person or character by giving clues, leading to words that sounded like part of the person's name (near the end of the run, places were also used as subjects). The contestant then had to sound the words out to figure out the person in question. The celebrities were not allowed to use anything that might give away the answer or to give a clue that would lead to the proper name of the person. They also could not give the clue to the contestant, with the penalty being loss of control for any violation. Each correct guess won a point, with three points winning the game.

For example:

- Clue #1: The part of the car that contains fuel is the gas... (Tank)
- Clue #2: The automobile is more commonly called a... (Car)
- Clue #3: George Washington is on the one-dollar... (Bill)
- Tank + Car + Bill = Tinker Bell

Or:

- Clue #1: A person who can't hear is... (Deaf)
- Clue #2: The fifth letter of the alphabet is... (E)
- Clue #3: When you park your boat, you tie it to the ... (Dock)
- Deaf + E + Dock = Daffy Duck

Proper names could not be used as clues, such as "Our president who was married to Jackie Onassis was named John F..." for "Kennedy". Clue-givers were also not allowed to describe a word that is spelled as part of the name.

The winning contestant played the Bonus Board for a chance at $300. A famous name (sent in by a home viewer) was given to the celebrity, who tried to convey the name to the contestant by way of clues. Guessing the word on the first clue won $300. Each additional clue reduced the value by $100. The celebrity could help with all three clues.

If the contestant won the front game 3–0, winning the Bonus Board on the first clue awarded $300 plus a new car, usually a Pontiac. In this situation, the celebrity was not allowed to help on the first clue.

Home viewers whose Bonus Board clue led to a car win also won a special prize. At one point this was 100,000 Top Value trading stamps, then one million stamps.

Players on the daytime version stayed until losing twice or winning seven times (NBC's limit at the time). On the primetime version, two new players competed for the entire show with a trip awarded to whoever won the most cash.

=== ABC ===
When the show returned in 1975, it also returned with a new format influenced largely by the success of CBS's Match Game. The two teams were replaced by two individual players competing with the assistance of four celebrities on a panel.

The celebrities once again tried to convey the identity of a famous person or place to the contestants. One celebrity gave a clue to the controlling contestant, who had five seconds to guess who it was with a correct word guess. If it wasn't guessed, the next celebrity in line gave a clue to the next contestant. This continued until one player guessed the word, with a maximum of four clues. A correct guess on the first clue was worth $200 and decreased in $50 increments for each clue needed afterward. 500 won the game and a chance to win $10,000 more at the Bonus Board.

At the Bonus Board, the contestant had to give a maximum of six (originally five) clues to four famous names or places to the celebrities. If a celebrity guessed one name correctly, the contestant won $500, which doubled to $1,000 if two names were guessed correctly, and then $2,000 if three names were guessed correctly. If all four names were guessed correctly, the contestant won $5,000. However, if each of the celebrities guessed the name after only one clue (four clues in total), the contestant won $10,000.

Players competed until either losing twice or exceeding ABC's winnings limit of $20,000 (but were allowed to keep winnings of up to $25,000).

=== Syndicated ===
Peck's version was played very similar to the ABC version, but with a few changes to accommodate the syndicated series (since the then-standard process of "bicycling" tapes shuffled the airings from city to city and made returning champions impractical). Two contestants played on Monday and Tuesday of a particular week, while two more played on Wednesday and Thursday. In a tournament fashion, the highest scorers from those games played each other on Friday. Instead of cash being awarded on a scale for each correct answer, every answer scored only one point, regardless of the number of clues necessary, with five winning the game. Correct answers were worth $100 on the Monday–Thursday shows and $200 on Fridays, but these payouts were not reflected in the scoring.

If the game ended in a tie due to time running out, the player who needed fewer clues during the game was declared the winner.

The Bonus Board was played the same as the ABC run for $5,000 in cash on Monday–Thursday shows. The Friday game, which was harder than the rest of the week, was played for $10,000 in prizes. This time, the player was allowed a maximum of five clues.

== Broadcast history ==
=== KTLA (1962–1963) ===
You Don't Say! began as a local series on Los Angeles station KTLA in November 1962 with Jack Barry, still in exile from the networks in the wake of the 1950s quiz show scandals, as host.

=== NBC (1963–1969) ===
You Don't Say! moved to NBC's afternoon lineup on April 1, 1963, at 3:30 PM Eastern (2:30 Central) with Tom Kennedy replacing Barry as host. For most of its run, the show placed a solid second against the CBS soap The Edge of Night and numerous ABC game shows and soap operas. A nighttime version in 1964 was not as successful, running from January 7 to May 12.

The game became the first national hit series of Ralph Andrews Productions after years of exclusively producing local series.

On July 15, 1968, One Life to Live debuted on ABC at 3:30/2:30 and was a ratings success. In what may have been the largest housecleaning of its daytime schedule ever, NBC dropped You Don't Say! and three other games (Personality, Eye Guess, and The Match Game) on September 26, 1969. Replacing You Don't Say! on the lineup was the serial Bright Promise, which ran until 1972.

=== KTLA (1975) ===
The 1975 revival was also given a trial run on KTLA, airing on Sunday nights from April to June 1975. Originally hosted by local radio personality Clark Race with Kennedy as a regular panelist, these roles were reversed later in the show's brief run.

=== ABC (1975) ===
With CBS' revival of Match Game bringing celebrity games back into popularity, Andrews managed to interest ABC in a similar revival of You Don't Say! Kennedy was called upon to reassume his role as the show's host, doing so ten days after ending a three-year stint on ABC's Split Second; the show entered ABC's schedule on July 7 at 4:00 PM (3:00 Central), replacing The Money Maze. However, many affiliates either tape-delayed the network feed until the next morning or preempted the 4:00/3:00 slot entirely, garnering low ratings for the revival despite facing NBC's soap opera Somerset and two CBS games, Musical Chairs and Give-n-Take.

Meanwhile, CBS' The Edge of Night had been its lowest-rated soap opera since a move in 1972 to 2:30/1:30. With As the World Turns set to expand to a full hour, the network decided to oust the nineteen-year-old show (which debuted on the same day As The World Turns did in 1956 and packaged by the same company). In the first instance of a daytime serial moving to another network, Procter and Gamble Productions agreed to CBS' terms and moved The Edge of Night to ABC. ABC, desperate to get some affiliates back on board, banked on the show's instant familiarity and decided that the only viable slot for that show was 4:00/3:00.

On November 28, You Don't Say! ended its five-month run, giving way to The Edge of Night the next Monday; as a result, a special Christmas week of shows with children playing, which Tom had plugged on-air during the last few weeks and would have continued the tradition from the NBC era, was never seen. According to an ABC press release dated November 6, 1975, You Don't Say! was slated to return to ABC's daytime schedule at a later time, but for unknown reasons, this never occurred.

=== Syndicated (1978–1979) ===
You Don't Say! returned on September 18, 1978, as a daily syndicated series, with Viacom Enterprises serving as the co-producer. However, due to Tom Kennedy hosting Name That Tune, the hosting reins were taken instead by Jim Peck.

This version did not sell to many markets, and those who ran it tended to do so in non-peak slots (save for WPIX in New York, which aired it at 8:30 PM as part of a primetime syndicated game show block with the premiering Tic Tac Dough and reruns of the syndicated editions of Let's Make a Deal and To Tell the Truth, as did KHJ-TV in Los Angeles). With little to no promotion, the show ended its run completely before even making it through the first half of 1979.

== Music ==
Composer Rex Koury was the musical director for the 1960s version, leading a small combo in the studio consisting of organ, xylophone and harp. Koury would play appropriate music after each name was guessed, or a generic "win cue" when a game was won.

Stan Worth composed the theme for the 1970s versions, called "Downwind".
