= Ralph Andrews =

American television producer (1927–2015)

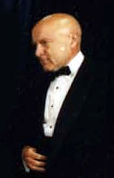
- Born: Ralph Herrick Andrews; December 17, 1927; Saginaw, Michigan, United States
- Died: October 16, 2015 (aged 87); Ventura, California, United States
- Occupations: Television producer, television host
- Years active: 1960s–1988
- Spouse: Margaret (Belt) Andrews (m. February 5, 1951; div. June 1977) Aleksandra Andrews
- Children: 7

Ralph Herrick Andrews (December 17, 1927 – October 16, 2015) was an American television producer best known for producing the 1960s game show You Don't Say!, the 1970s game show Celebrity Sweepstakes, and the original 1987 version of Lingo.

== Early years ==
Born and raised in Saginaw, Michigan, Andrews worked as a radio disc jockey before becoming a studio page at NBC and working as an apprentice to Ralph Edwards. He also briefly worked for producers Don Fedderson, John Guedel and Warner Bros. Television.

== Television ==
In 1958, he started his own production company Ralph Andrews Productions (originally Andrews-Spears Productions with Harry Spears then Andrews-Yagemann Productions with Bill Yageman), and originally in partnership with Wolper Productions, to produce unscripted shows. One of the most notable was in 1961 when KHJ-TV premiered a show he hosted, called Lie Detector, and the show later aired on KTTV after KHJ-TV dropped it.

In 1961, the company entered into a partnership with Desilu, the company later broke off in the mid 1960s, and made its first national hit, You Don't Say! in 1963. In 1967, Yagemann sold his stock to Andrews, as Bill Yagemann made a desire to produce feature films, ending the partnership with Yagemann, as the company becoming Ralph Andrews Productions.

He also produced the Vin Scully edition of It Takes Two, Liar's Club, and 50 Grand Slam in the 1970s, as well as I'll Bet in 1965, and its revival which had a healthy four-year run from 1969 called It's Your Bet. One of his final productions was a syndicated game show called Yahtzee.

In 1968 Andrews gained his sole director credit, for a documentary about early film history, Silent Treatment. He was executive producer of the film Wild in the Sky in 1972.

In 1970, he briefly sold his company to television broadcaster Meredith Corporation, and briefly becoming MC Productions in 1972, before reacquiring the rights to the game shows in late 1972, which resulted in a civil action lawsuit in the late 1970s.

From 1980 to 1986, Andrews and his production company had an office at Columbia Pictures' lot located at the Burbank Studios in Burbank, California. Andrews had a deal with Columbia Pictures Television to present projects to the studio. If CPT wasn't interested, Andrews had the right to pass on the project to other studios as long as he was properly credited; the provisions in the contract led to a lawsuit filed against Paramount Television by Andrews over the 1984 game show Anything for Money, which had originated in Andrews' production company. Andrews had a partnership with IDTV to form Idra Global Entertainment in 1989.

== Politics ==
After an approach by Senator Bob Dole, Andrews joined the Republican National Committee as Director of Education and Training, with responsibility for providing media and television training to Republican candidates. In 1977, he was one of three candidates in a special election for the legislative seat from California's 22nd State Senatorial District.

From 1998 to 2001 Andrews wrote an opinion blog expounding on his mostly conservative-Republican views. This followed on from similar print columns, originally in a local newspaper and then in a paper he purchased and published himself (The Harbor News, Ventura, California). He was also active in promoting nuclear energy as a solution to global warming.

== Film ==
Andrews' films included Wild in the Sky and The Silent Treatment. In 1984 Andrews obtained the movie rights to the life story of the Polish union leader and human rights activist, Lech Wałęsa, whom he met and became friends with. No film resulted, but Wałęsa and his wife stood as godparents to Ralph's son in 1988.

== Other professional activities ==
Andrews was involved in education at UCLA Extension and Rio Hondo College, teaching television and film production courses at both institutions.

Andrews was a co-founder of the Entertainment Industries Council, which helps people combat abuse of drugs and alcohol.

== Death ==
On October 16, 2015, Andrews died of Alzheimer's disease in Ventura, California at the age of 87. He was survived by his wife, five sons, two daughters, 15 grandchildren and 20 great-grandchildren.

== Notes and references ==
Preceded by Michael Reagan	Host of Lingo; 1988	Succeeded by Chuck Woolery
