= Allen Ludden =

American radio and television personality (1917–1981)

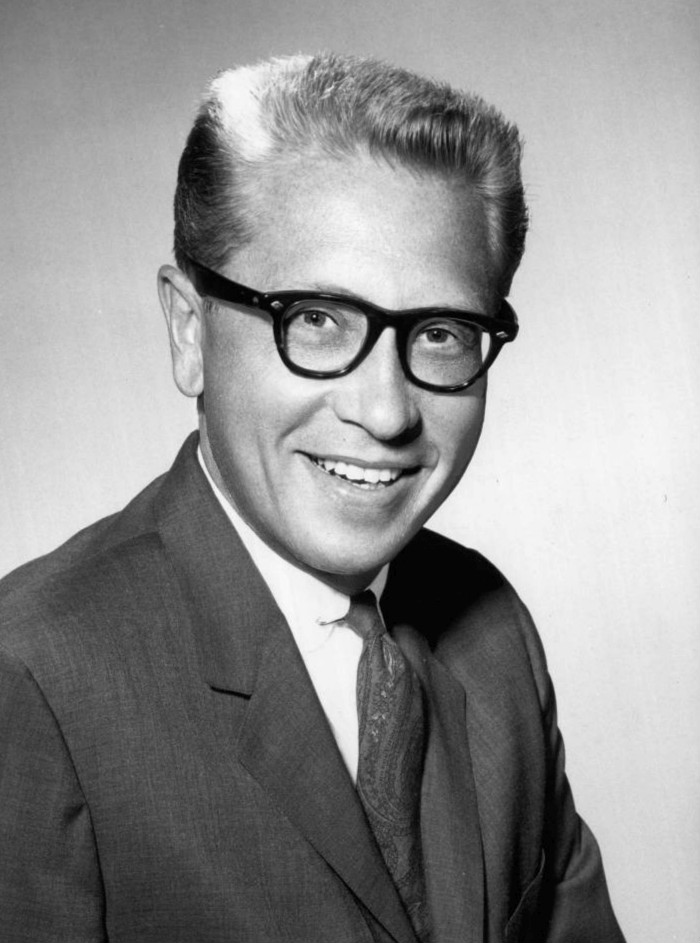
- Ludden in 1961
- Born: Allen Packard Ellsworth; October 5, 1917; Mineral Point, Wisconsin, U.S.
- Died: June 9, 1981 (aged 63); Los Angeles, California, U.S.
- Resting place: Graceland Cemetery, Mineral Point, Wisconsin, U.S.
- Education: University of Texas
- Occupations: Game show host; television personality; actor; singer
- Years active: 1949–1981
- Spouses: Margaret McGloin (m. 1943; died 1961); Betty White (m. 1963)
- Children: 3

Allen Ellsworth Ludden (born Allen Packard Ellsworth; October 5, 1917 – June 9, 1981) was an American television personality, actor, singer, emcee, and game show host. He hosted various incarnations of the game show Password between 1961 and 1980.

== Early years ==
Ludden was born on October 5, 1917, in Mineral Point, Wisconsin, the first child of Elmer and Leila M. (née Allen) Ellsworth. Elmer was a Nebraska native who worked as an ice dealer, while Leila was a Wisconsin native and housewife. Elmer Ellsworth died on January 6, 1919, at age 26, from the Spanish flu.

When Ludden was about five years old, his mother married Homer J. Ludden, an electrical engineer. Homer J. Ludden was the son of Franklin C. Ludden, a merchant and then the superintendent of the electric plant in Mineral Point, Wisconsin. Allen was given his adoptive father's name and became Allen Ellsworth Ludden. The family lived briefly in the Wisconsin cities of Janesville, Elkhorn, Antigo, and Waupaca before moving to Texas when Ludden was nine years old.

== Education and career ==
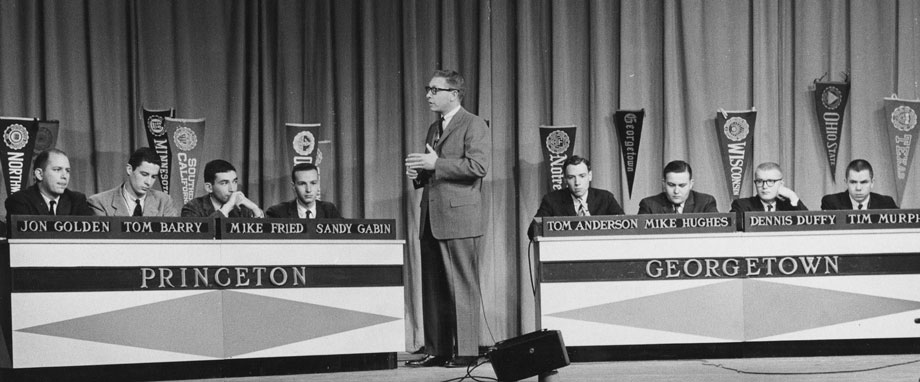
Ludden hosting a match between Princeton and Georgetown University on the General Electric College Bowl in 1959

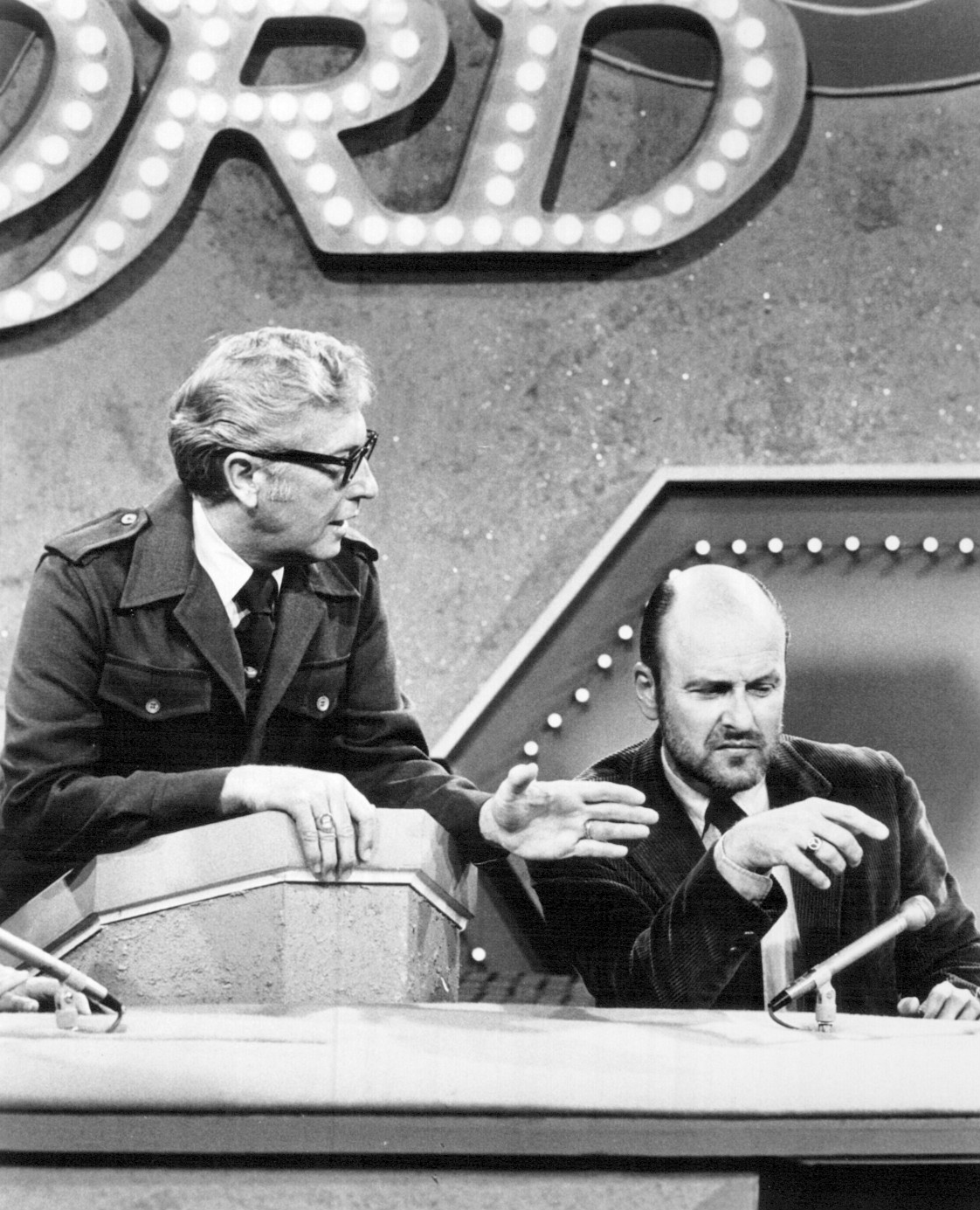
Ludden with Werner Klemperer on Password in 1971

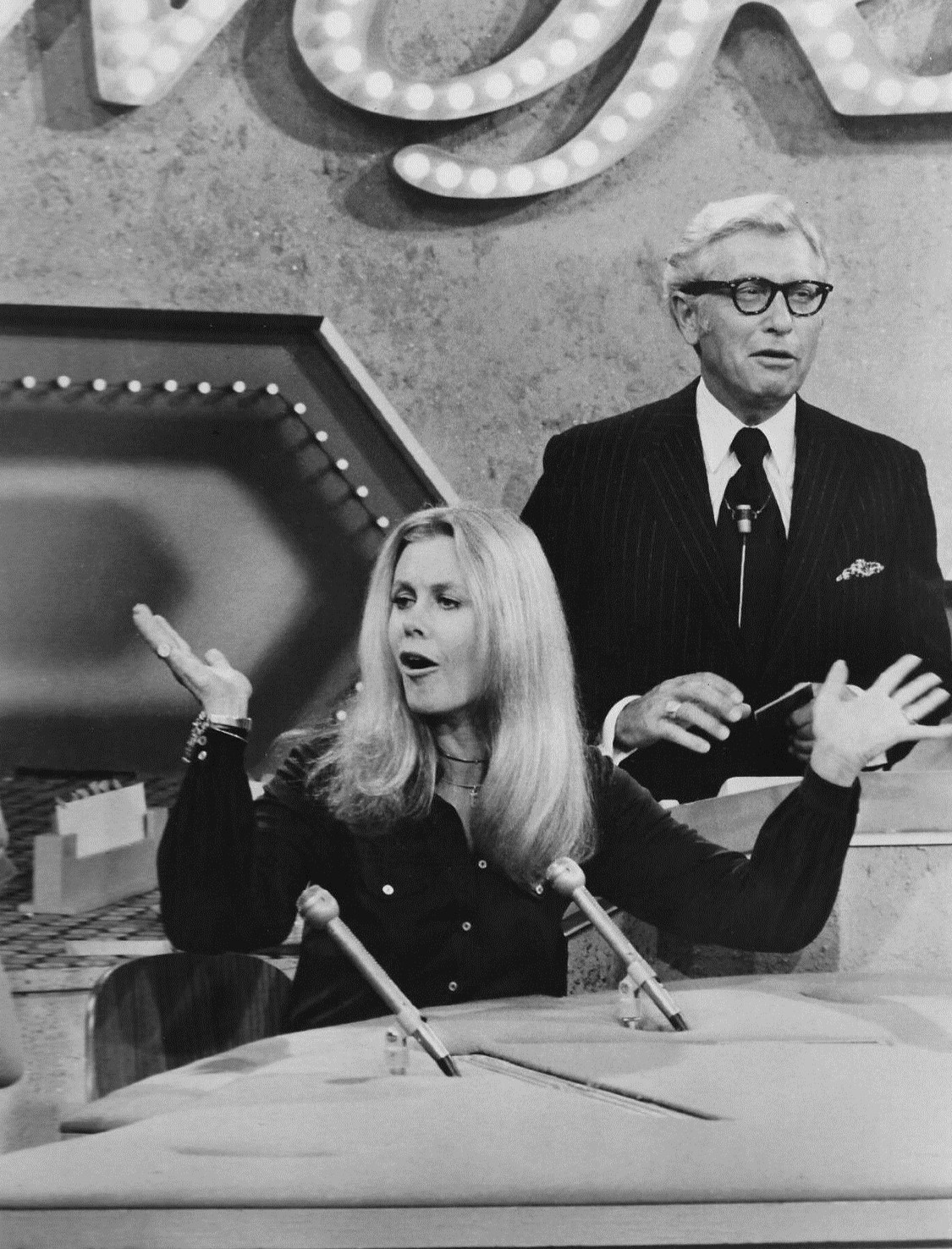
Ludden with Elizabeth Montgomery on Password in 1972

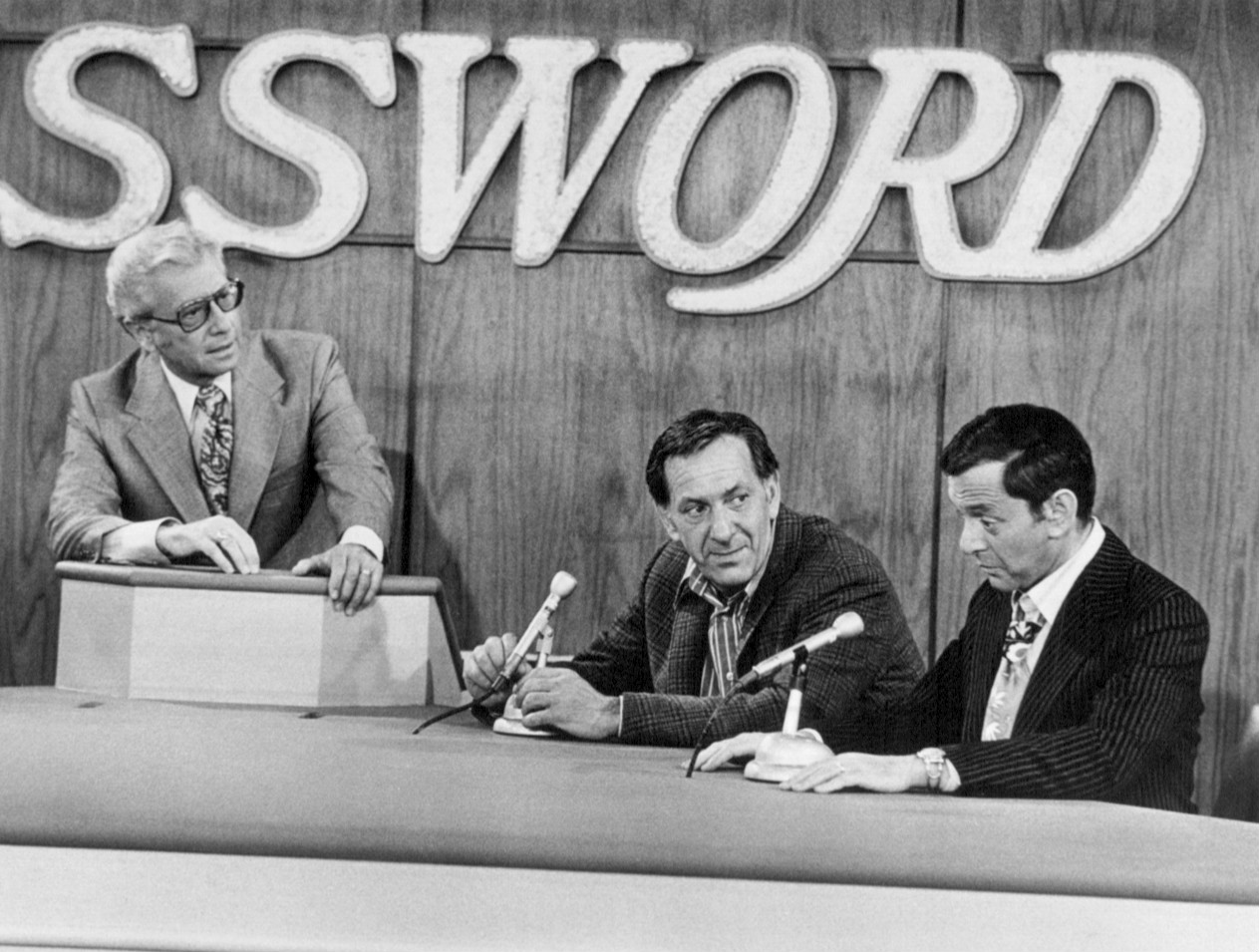
Ludden with Jack Klugman and Tony Randall of The Odd Couple on Password in 1973

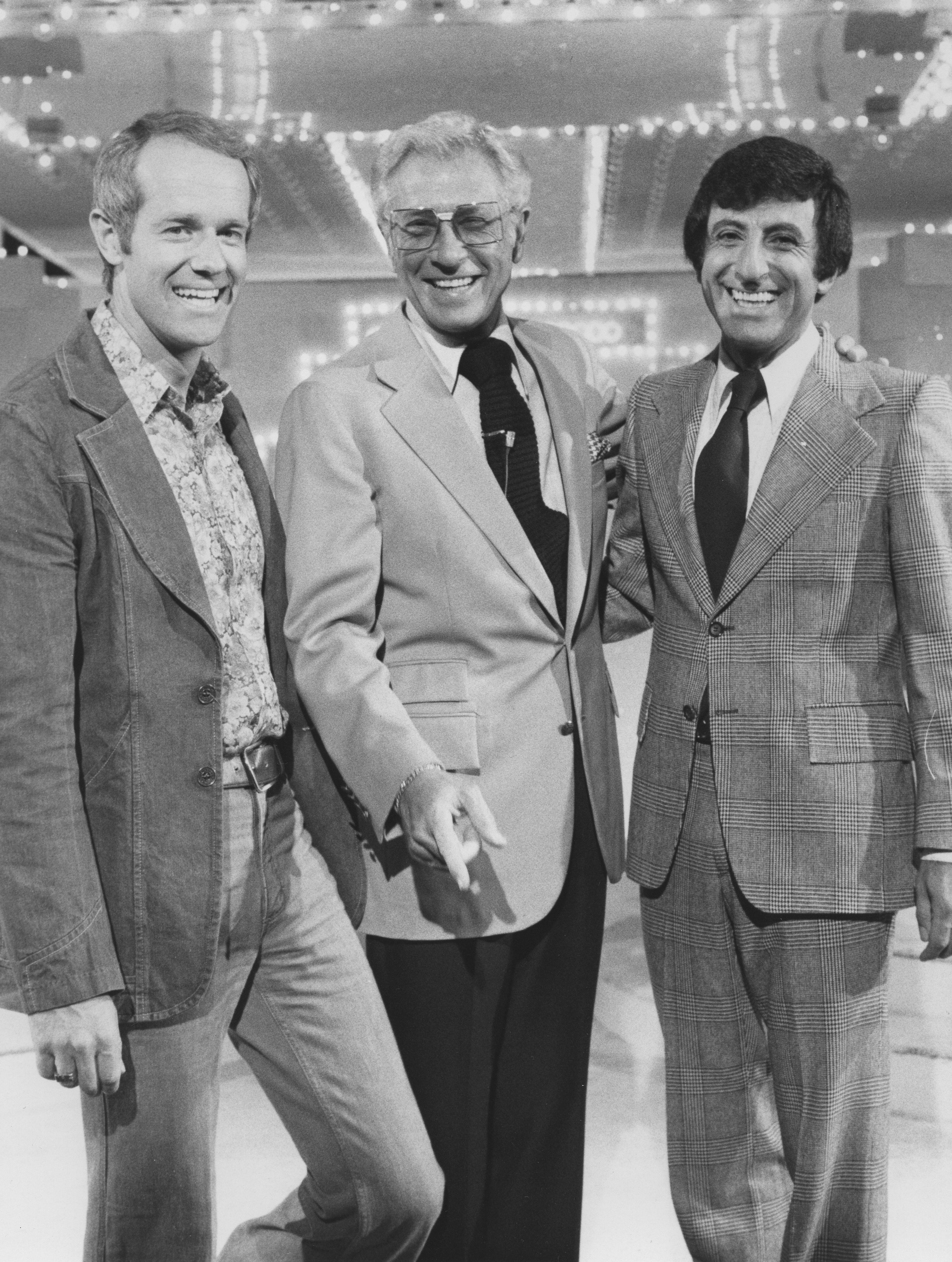
Ludden (center) with M*A*S*H stars Mike Farrell (left) and Jamie Farr (right) on the game show Stumpers in 1976.

An English and dramatics major at the University of Texas (now known as the University of Texas at Austin), Ludden graduated with Phi Beta Kappa honors in 1940 and received his Master of Arts in English from the same university in 1941. He served in the United States Army as officer in charge of entertainment in the Pacific theater, received a Bronze Star Medal for meritorious service, and was discharged with the rank of captain in 1946.

In 1948, Ludden became the program director at radio station WCBS in New York City. He left that position in June 1959 to become program coordinator for all CBS owned-and-operated radio stations. During the late 1940s and early 1950s he began his career as an adviser for youth in teen magazine columns and on radio. His radio show for teenagers, Mind Your Manners, received an honorable mention Peabody Award in 1950.

Ludden hosted many game shows, including the College Bowl, but he was most well-known for hosting both the daytime and prime time versions of Password on CBS and ABC between 1961 and 1975. His opening TV catch phrase, "Hi doll," was directed toward his mother-in-law, Tess White, the mother of his wife, actress and television personality Betty White.

Ludden began hosting an updated version of the game, Password Plus, on NBC, in 1979, but chemotherapy treatments for stomach cancer forced him off the show in late October 1980. Other shows hosted by Ludden include Liar's Club, Win with the Stars, and Stumpers! He also hosted the original pilot for The Joker's Wild and hosted a talk-variety show, Allen Ludden's Gallery.

At the request of the publishers Dodd, Mead & Co., Ludden wrote and published four books of "Plain Talk" advice, plus a youth novel, Roger Thomas, Actor (1959), all for young readers. He received the 1961 Horatio Alger Award. He released an album called Allen Ludden Sings His Favorite Songs on RCA Records in 1964.

== Family ==
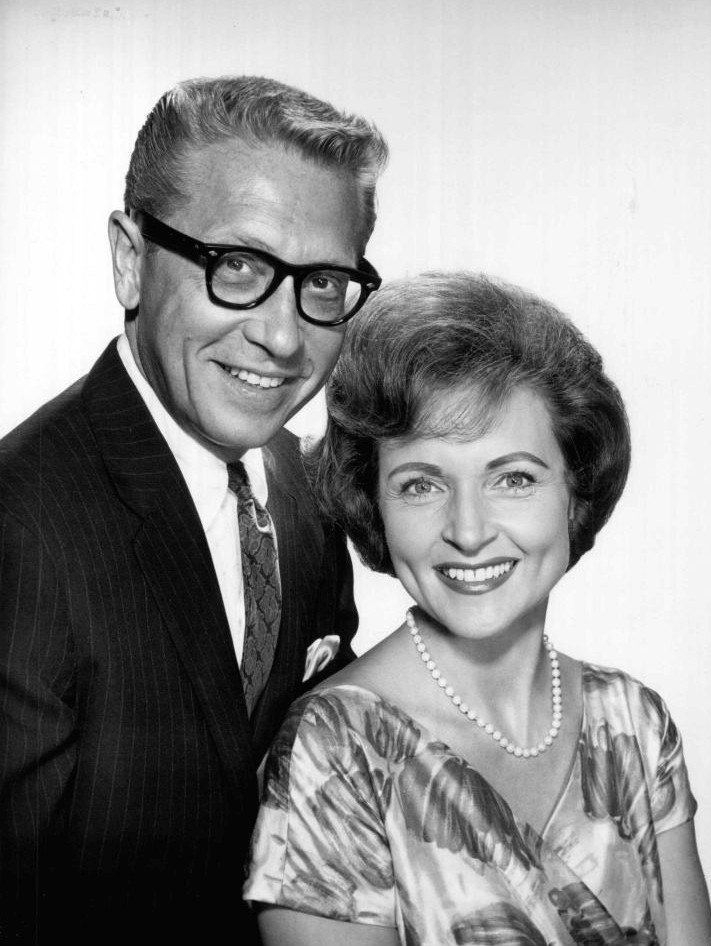
Ludden with Betty White (1963)

Ludden married Margaret McGloin on October 11, 1943. She died of cancer on October 30, 1961. They had a son, David, and two daughters, Martha and Sarah.

He proposed to Betty White, whom he had met on Password, at least twice before she accepted. Their romance blossomed when they played summer stock theatre together, in the play Critic's Choice in 1962. They also appeared together in the romantic comedy Janus in 1963. They were married on June 14, 1963, and remained together until Ludden's death.

They appeared together in an episode of The Odd Couple in which Felix and Oscar appeared on Password and also as a couple on a season 4 episode of The Love Boat.

== Death ==
After Ludden was diagnosed with stomach cancer in early 1980, he took a month-long leave of absence from Password Plus for chemotherapy treatment, with Bill Cullen filling in as host. On October 7, 1980, he slipped into a coma while on vacation in Monterey, California. It was initially reported that he had a stroke, but the coma was actually caused by high levels of calcium from medication taken to help fight the cancer. Tom Kennedy assumed duties as host of Password Plus, and although Ludden hoped to return to the show, his cancer grew worse and he never returned. He died in Los Angeles on June 9, 1981, at age 63. Ludden is buried beside his biological father in the Ellsworth family plot in Graceland Cemetery in his hometown of Mineral Point, Wisconsin.

== Legacy ==
A walkway at the Los Angeles Zoo was named in his memory (Betty White was a board member at the zoo), as was an artificial lake in Mineral Point, named Ludden Lake. Betty White also donated a Labrador retriever named "Ludden" to Guide Dogs for the Blind in San Rafael, California, in memory of her late husband.

Ludden's star on the Hollywood Walk of Fame is located on the north side of the 6700 block of Hollywood Boulevard, next to Betty White's. White accepted Ludden's posthumous star on April 19, 1987, during an appearance on This Is Your Life. The star was formally unveiled in a ceremony on March 31, 1988.

When Betty White was asked in an interview on Larry King Live whether she would remarry, she said, "Once you've had the best, who needs the rest?" She never remarried and died in 2021 at age 99.

== Archive ==
The Allen Ludden Papers collection is located at the Free Public Library in his native Mineral Point, Wisconsin. The items include letters written or received by Ludden, typed radio scripts, newspaper and magazine clippings by or about Ludden, publicity photographs and personal photographs, and a broken pair of horn-rimmed glasses. The collection was donated by Betty White.

== Awards and honors ==
=== Military ===
- Bronze Star Medal 1946

=== Television ===
- Daytime Emmy Award for Outstanding Game Show Host 1976

=== Other ===
- Hollywood Walk of Fame 1988 (posthumous)
