= Celebrity Sweepstakes =

American game show

- Created by: Ralph Andrews
- Presented by: Jim McKrell
- Announcer: Bill Armstrong; Dick Tufeld (substitute); John Harlan (substitute); Charlie O'Donnell (substitute)
- Composers: Stan Worth; Alan Thicke
- Country of origin: United States
- No. of episodes: 645 (NBC)

Production
- Production locations: NBC Studios; Burbank, California
- Running time: 25 minutes (April 1, 1974-January 3, 1975 NBC episodes); 30 minutes
- Production companies: Ralph Andrews Productions; Burt Sugarman Productions

Original release
- Network: NBC
- Release: April 1, 1974 – October 1, 1976
- Network: Syndication
- Release: September 20, 1976 – May 23, 1977

Celebrity Sweepstakes is an American television game show that aired on NBC's daytime schedule from April 1, 1974, to October 1, 1976. The show also had two separate weekly syndicated runs from September 9, 1974, to September 1975 and again from September 20, 1976, to May 23, 1977.

Jim McKrell hosted the show. Bill Armstrong was the main announcer, with Dick Tufeld, Charlie O'Donnell and John Harlan substituting. Joey Bishop and Carol Wayne were the regulars who appeared most often. Other panelists included Betty White, Clifton Davis, Buddy Hackett, George Hamilton, Jim Nabors, JoAnn Pflug and Freddie Prinze. CS was produced jointly by Ralph Andrews and Burt Sugarman. The first theme song was composed by Stan Worth, and the second by Alan Thicke.

== Gameplay ==
The game used a horse racing motif as its premise. Two contestants (originally three in the early weeks) competed for the entire show, and started the game with $20 (sometimes $50) each, trying to predict which of six celebrities could correctly answer questions posed by the host. Some questions were based on biographical information provided by the celebrities, but they did not receive any of the questions in advance. Information on their strengths and weaknesses was given to the audience and contestants in the form of tip sheets, akin to actual horse racing forms.

=== Round 1 ===
The host asked a question, and the celebrities wrote down their answers while the audience members each voted for a celebrity they believed could answer correctly. The results were used to set payout odds on the celebrities, displayed on totalizator panels at their desks. Odds ranged from 1:1 (even money) or 2:1 for the celebrity who received the most votes, to as high as 99:1 for the one who received the fewest; these two were dubbed the "favorite" and "longshot" respectively. During the final 13 weeks of the show, the host announced the category, allowed the audience time to vote, then read the question.

The contestant in control placed a bet on one celebrity, based on the following rules:

- Up to $100 or the contestant's entire total on the favorite, whichever was less (later changed to $10 less than the contestant's total)
- Either $2, $5, or $10 on anyone other than the favorite, if he/she had more than $10
- $2 only, if he/she had $10 or less

A correct answer multiplied the bet by the relevant odds and added it to the contestant's total (e.g. a $10 bet at 4:1 awarded $40), while a miss deducted the bet and allowed the opponent to place one on any of the five remaining celebrities. If no one had the correct answer, the question was thrown out ("scratched") and a new one was asked. If either contestant's score dropped to $1 or zero, both contestants were given $1 or $2 respectively so they could still make the minimum bet.

Contestants alternated control on successive questions, and the round lasted for an unspecified time limit.

Near the end of the show's run, the celebrities simply gave their answers aloud when called on instead of writing them down first.

=== Home Stretch ===
In this round, celebrities always wrote down their answers, and a contestant who won a bet could double the payout by picking a second celebrity who had the correct answer. During the earliest and latest portions of the series run, an incorrect second pick cost the contestant all the money he/she had won on the first one, but he/she could opt not to play for double winnings. If only one celebrity gave the correct answer, a bell would ring and any bets placed on him/her would pay out at double odds. Each contestant received one turn.

=== The All or Nothing Question ===
The host announced a category, and the odds for each celebrity were set based on how well he/she had performed up to that point: 1:1 for no more than one wrong answer, 2:1 for two, 3:1 or for three, and so on. Once the odds were set, the celebrities wrote down their answers, and each contestant secretly chose one and decided whether to bet his/her entire total ("all") or no money ("nothing").

Both contestants kept any money they had left after this question; in addition, any contestant who bet "all" and lost received a large prize worth approximately $1,000. The contestant with the higher total returned as champion on the next show; in the event of a tie, both contestants returned. Champions remained on the show until defeated, and won a car after every third victory.

Later changes to the round were as follows:

- Odds were set by audience vote, and could run as high as 8:1 (later reduced to 5:1).
- If both contestants lost all their money, neither of them returned as champion.
- Champions were retired after three days, then five, with the car awarded only after the fifth win at first and the third win later.

=== Syndication rule changes ===
On the syndicated versions, two new contestants played each week and the overall winner received a bonus prize. There were no returning champions.

Later in this run, contestants were occasionally given the chance to win a prize package (the "exacta") by guessing how many celebrities had correctly answered the current question. They made their guesses in secret, and could both win the package for being correct. The exacta was added to the NBC version during its last 13 weeks, but with an added requirement that contestants make different guesses.

== Promotions ==
The program was involved in NBC's first cross-game promotion, held on St. Patrick's Day in 1975 and called "Shamrock Sweepstakes". Players from NBC's six daytime game shows at the time (Sweepstakes, High Rollers, Wheel of Fortune, Hollywood Squares, Jackpot!, and Blank Check) answered a set of questions dealing with Ireland and Irish/Irish-American people; the one who got the most correct won $100,000.

A later promotion, lasting a week, gave home viewers a chance to win. Two celebrities played the game each day; many of these were actors from NBC soap operas, but Chuck Woolery and Susan Stafford of Wheel of Fortune played on the last day. Each celebrity was paired with a viewer who had sent in their name and telephone number. In order to be eligible to win, a viewer had to answer their phone when a call from the show came in. At the end of the week, the eligible viewers paired with the three highest-scoring celebrities received whatever totals they had won, with an additional $75,000 for first place, $20,000 for second, and $5,000 for third.

== Episode status ==
The episode status of Celebrity Sweepstakes is unclear. It is possible that the series was destroyed as per network policy at the time. The pilot and finale both circulate among collectors, and a 1975 episode from the Warhol collection is held by The Paley Center for Media in New York, as well as two other episodes. The final episode can also be currently viewed on YouTube. In addition, the last 30 seconds of the January 6, 1975 show exist on audio tape, which features Chuck Woolery promoting the premiere of Wheel of Fortune. Additionally, about 2 minutes and 20 seconds of the March 18, 1975 episode recorded off WAVE in Louisville and featuring a clip of the Shamrock Sweepstakes mentioned above has surfaced and can be viewed at the FuzzyMemories YouTube channel.

The status of the syndicated versions is also unclear. It had been assumed by traders that these episodes, along with the daytime episodes, were in the possession of producer Burt Sugarman. On January 9, 2013, host Jim McKrell was interviewed on the Shokus Radio program "Stu's Show" and seemed to contradict this, saying that the entire run of Celebrity Sweepstakes was destroyed due to the issues of dual ownership between Sugarman and Ralph Andrews.

The YouTube channel “Game Show Vault” started streaming episodes from the second nighttime syndicated run in 2026.

Andrews briefly sold the program to Burt Sugarman in 1974, only to be sold back to Andrews in 1976.

== Foreign versions ==
=== United Kingdom ===
The Sweepstakes Game, using a similar format with Bernard Braden as host, ran for 13 weeks on LWT from July 3 to September 25, 1976. A fourteenth episode later aired as a Christmas special.

=== Japan ===
Quiz Derby, with similar rules but only five celebrities, was a much more popular version than both its American and British counterparts. It ran weekly from 1976 to 1992.

=== Australia ===
In September 1977, ATV-0 in Melbourne premiered All-Star Sweepstakes with John Newman as host. The series lasted until January 1978.
