= List of American game shows =

The following is a list of game shows in the United States. Ongoing shows are in bold type.

== General game and quiz shows ==
=== # ===
- 1 vs. 100 (2006–2008, 2010–2011)
- **The 1% Club** (**2024–present**)
- 2 Minute Drill (2000–2001)
- 3 for the Money (1975)
- 10 Seconds (1993–1994)
- 20Q (2009)
- **25 Words or Less** (**2019–present**; began as a test run in 2018)
- 50 Grand Slam (1976)
- **99 to Beat** (**2025–present**)
- 100 Grand (1963)
- 100% (1999)
- 101 Ways to Leave a Game Show (2011)
- 500 Questions (2015–2016)
- $1,000 Reward (1950)
- The $10,000 Pyramid (1973–1976; began as a 1973 pilot called Cash on the Line)
  - The $20,000 Pyramid (1976–1980)
  - The $25,000 Pyramid (1974–1979, 1982–1987, 1988)
  - The $50,000 Pyramid (1981)
  - **The $100,000 Pyramid** (1985–1988, 1991, **2016–present**)
  - Pyramid (2002–2004)
  - The Pyramid (2012)
- The $1,000,000 Chance of a Lifetime (1986–1987)

=== A ===
- About Faces (1960–1961)
- Across the Board (1959)
- Add a Line (1949)
- Adivinelo con Señas (1988–1990; Spanish-language game show)
- All About Faces (1971–1972)
- All About the Opposite Sex (1990)
- All-Star Blitz (1985)
- All Star Secrets (1979)
- Almost Anything Goes (1975–1976; page links to British version, which mentions the American one in detail)
  - All-Star Anything Goes (1977–1978)
- The Almost Impossible Gameshow (2016)
- Alumni Fun (1963–1966)
- The Amazing American (1940)
- America Says (2018–2022)
- The American Bible Challenge (2012–2014)
- American Gladiators (Syndicated, 1989–1996)
  - American Gladiators (NBC, 2008)
  - **American Gladiators** (**Prime Video, 2026-present**)
- Americana (1947–1949)
- **American Ninja Warrior** (**2009–present**)
- Amne$ia (2008)
- Animal Crack-Ups (1987–1989, 1990)
- Answer Yes or No (1950)
- Anybody Can Play (1958)
- Anyone Can Win (1953)
- Anything for Money (1984–1985)
- Anything You Can Do (1971–1974)
- Are You a Genius? (1942–1943)
- Are You Smarter than a 5th Grader? (2007–2009, 2009–2011, 2015, 2019)
  - **Are You Smarter than a Celebrity?** (**2024–present**)
- The Art Ford Show (1951)
- The Art Linkletter Show (1963)
- The Ask-It Basket (1939–1941)
- Auction Quiz (1941–1942)
- Auction-Aire (1949–1950)
- Awake: The Million Dollar Game (2019)

=== B ===
- Baby Game (1968)
- Baffle (1973-1974)
- Balance Your Budget (1952–1953)
- Balderdash (2004–2005)
- Bank on the Stars (1953–1954)
- Bargain Hunters (1987)
- The Baron and the Bee (1953–1954)
- Battle Dome (1999–2001)
- Battle of the Ages (1952)
- Battle of the Ages (2019; unrelated to above)
- Battle of the Network Stars (1976–1985, 1988, 2003, 2017)
- Battle of the Sexes (1938–1943)
- Battlestars (1981–1982) and its revival, The New Battlestars (1983)
- Beach Clash (1994–1995)
- **Beat Shazam** (**2017–present**)
- Beat the Band (1940–1941, 1943–1944)
- **Beat the Bridge** (**2024–present**)
- Beat the Clock (1950–1961, 1969–1974, 1979–1980, 2002–2003)
- Beat the Geeks (2001–2002)
- Beat the Odds (1968–1969; also an unsold 1975 pilot hosted by Chuck Henry)
- Ben Bernie's Musical Quiz (1938–1940)
- The Better Half (1942–1950)
- The Better Sex (1977–1978)
- Bid 'N' Buy (1958)
- Big Fan (2017)
- The Big Game (1958)
- The Big Moment (1999)
- The Big Payoff (1951–1959, 1962)
- The Big Showdown (1974–1975)
- The Big Surprise (1955–1957)
- Binge Thinking (2016)
- **Bingo Blitz** (**2025–present**)
- Black Card Revoked (2018)
- Blackout (1988)
- Blade Warriors (1994–1995)
- Blank Check (1975)
- Blankety Blanks (1975)
- Blank Slate (2024)
- Blockbusters (1980–1982, 1987)
- Boardwalk and Baseball's Super Bowl of Sports Trivia (1988–1989)
- Bobcat's Big Ass Show (1998)
- Boggle: The Interactive Game (1994)
- Boom! (2015)
- Born Lucky (1992–1993)
- Bowling for Dollars (circa 1970s; many local versions)
- Bowling Headliners (1948–1950)
- Braingames (1983, 1984–1985; pilot, five episodes, and a "Best Of" special)
- Brain Games (2019–2022, had previously been an educational series with no game show elements from 2011 to 2016)
- Brains and Brawn (1958)
- Break the Bank (1945–1957)
- Break the Bank (1976–1977)
- Break the Bank (1985–1986)
- Broadway to Hollywood (1949–1954; also called Headline Clues and Broadway to Hollywood Headline Clues)
- Broke Ass Game Show (2015–2016)
- Bruce Forsyth's Hot Streak (1986; began as a 1983 pilot titled Party Line with Gene Rayburn hosting)
- Bullseye (1980–1982; called Celebrity Bullseye beginning in December 1981)
- Bumper Stumpers (1987–1990)

=== C ===
- Caesars Challenge (1993–1994)
- Call My Bluff (1965)
- Calling All Detectives (1945, c.1947–1950)
- Camouflage (ABC, 1961–1962; Syndicated, 1980)
- Camouflage (GSN, 2007)
- Can Do (1956)
- Candy Crush (2017)
- Candy Land (2020)
- Card Sharks (1978–1981, 1986–1989, 2001, 2019–2021)
- The Carnation Family Party (1938, 1942, 1950–1951)
- Cash and Carry (1946–1947; first "network" television game show)
- Cash Cab (New York) (2005–2012; 2017–2020)
  - Cash Cab: After Dark (2007)
  - Cash Cab: Chicago (2011)
- Catch Me if You Can (1948)
  - Hit the Jackpot (1948–1949, 1950)
- Catchphrase (1985–1986; also an unsold 2006 pilot titled All-New Catch Phrase)
- CBS Television Quiz (1941–1942)
- Celebrity Billiards (1967–1968)
- Celebrity Bowling (1969, 1971–1978, 1987–1988, 2008)
- The Celebrity Game (1964–1965; also an unsold 1968 pilot hosted by Bert Parks)
- Celebrity Golf (1960–1961)
- Celebrity Lanes (1961–1962)
- Celebrity Name Game (2014–2017)
- Celebrity Sweepstakes (1974–1977)
- Celebrity Tennis (1973–1974)
- Chain Letter (1966)
- Chain Reaction (1980, 1986–1991, 2006–2007, 2015–2016, 2021–2022)
- The Chair (2002)
- The Chamber (2002)
- Chance for Romance (1958)
- Chance of a Lifetime (1949–1952)
- Charade Quiz (1947–1949)
- Charge Account (1960–1962; also known as Jan Murray's Charge Account)
- The Chase (2013–2015, 2021–2023)
- The Cheap Show (1978–1979)
- Child Support (2018)
- Child's Play (1982–1983)
  - Dame la Pista (2008; Spanish version)
- Choose Up Sides (1940–1941)
- Cinderella Inc. (1946–1947)
- Clash! (1990–1991)
  - Vs. (1999)
- College Bowl (CBS/NBC/Syndicated; 1953–1955, 1959–1970, 1978–1979, 1984, 2021–2022; 1970s and 1980s versions were specials)
  - College Bowl (Disney Channel; 1987)
  - Honda Campus All-Star Challenge (1990–1995; continues to be held)
- College Mad House (1989–1990; college version of Fun House)
- Come Closer (1954)
- Comedy of Errors (1949–1952)
- Common Knowledge (2019–2021)
- Concentration (1958–1978)
  - Classic Concentration (1987–1991)
- Coronet Quick Quiz (1944–1945)
- Correction Please (1943–1944, 1945)
- Couch Potatoes (1989)
- County Fair (1945–1950, 1958–1959)
- Cram (2003)
- Crossword (1966; two unsold pilots hosted by George Fenneman)
  - The Cross-Wits (1975–1980) and its revival, The New Cross Wits (1986–1987)
  - Merv Griffin's Crosswords (2007–2008)
- The Cube (2021–2023; began as a 2010 unsold pilot hosted by Neil Patrick Harris)

=== D ===
- Daily Dilemmas (1946–1948)
- Dance Machine (2008)
- Darts for Dough (1940s)
- Deal or No Deal (NBC, 2005–2009)
  - Vas o No Vas (2006–2007; Spanish version)
  - Deal or No Deal (Syndicated, 2008–2010)
  - Deal or No Deal (CNBC, 2018–2019)
- Dealer's Choice (1974–1975)
- Debt (1996–1998)
- Detect and Collect (1945–1946)
- The Diamond Head Game (1975)
- Dirty Rotten Cheater (2003)
- Distraction (2005–2006)
- Divided (2017–2018)
- Do You Trust Your Wife? (1956–1957)
  - Who Do You Trust? (1957–1963; called Do You Trust Your Wife? until 1958)
- Dr. I.Q. (1939–1950, 1953–1954, 1958–1959)
  - Dr. I.Q., Jr. (1941, 1948–1949; spinoff with children playing, as well as a 1953 unsold pilot)
- Dog Eat Dog (2002–2003)
- Dollar a Second (1953–1956, 1957; also a 1981 pilot hosted by Bob Eubanks)
- Don Adams' Screen Test (1975–1976)
- Don't (2020)
- **Don't Forget the Lyrics!** (Fox, 2007–2009, **2022–present**)
  - Don't Forget the Lyrics! (Syndicated, 2010–2011)
- Dotto (1958; aired on CBS daytime and NBC primetime)
- Double Dare (CBS, 1976–1977)
- Double Exposure (1961)
- Double or Nothing (1940–1954)
- Dough Re Mi (1958–1960)
- Downfall (2010)
- Draw Me a Laugh (1949)
- Draw to Win (1952)
- Dream Girl of '67 (1966–1967)
  - Dream Girl USA (1986–1987)
- Dream House (1968–1970, 1983–1984)
- Duel (2007–2008)
- Dueling for Playmates (1983–1988)

=== E ===
- Earn Your Vacation (1949–1950, 1954)
- Ellen's Game of Games (2017–2021)
- Emogenius (2017)
- Estate of Panic (2008)
- Every Second Counts (1984–1985)
- Everybody Wins (1948)
- Everybody's Talking (1967)
  - Hollywood's Talking (1973)
- Everything Goes (1981–1988)
- Everything's Relative (1965; also an unsold 1980 pilot hosted by Jim Peck)
- Exit (2013)
- Extreme Dodgeball (2004–2005)
- Eye Guess (1966–1969)

=== F ===
- The Face Is Familiar (1966)
- Face the Facts (1961)
- Face the Music (1980–1981)
- Face to Face (1946–1947)
- **Family Feud** (1976–1985, 1988–1995, **1999–present**)
  - **Celebrity Family Feud** (1978–1984, 2008, **2015–present**; first version was a sporadic series of primetime specials)
  - ¿Qué Dice La Gente? (2006–2008; Spanish version)
  - **100 Latinos Dijeron** (**2013–present**; Spanish version)
- The Family Game (1967)
- Family Game Fight! (2021–2022)
- Family Secrets (1993)
- Fandango (1983–1989)
- Fast Draw (1968)
- Feather Your Nest (1954–1956)
- The Final Straw (2022)
- Finders Keepers (1944–1945)
- Fish Pond (1944)
- **Flip Side** **(2024–present)**
- **The Floor** (**2024–present**)
- **Floor is Lava** (**2020–present**)
- Follow the Leader (1953)
- For Love or Money (1958–1959)
- Fractured Phrases (1965)
- Free 4 All (1994)
- Freedom Rings (1953)
- Friend or Foe? (2002–2003)
- The Fun Factory (1976)
- Fun For All (1952–1953)
- Fun in Print (1940)
- Funny You Should Ask (1968–1969)
- **Funny You Should Ask** (**2017–present**)

=== G ===
- Gambit (1972–1976) and its revival, Las Vegas Gambit (1980–1981)
  - Catch 21 (2008–2011, 2019–2020)
- Gamble on Love (1954)
  - Time Will Tell (1954)
- The Game Game (1969–1970)
- The Game of Life (2011–2012)
- The Game Plane (2014–2015)
- Game On! (2020)
- Game Show in My Head (2009)
- Game of Talents (2021)
- Gameshow Marathon (2006)
- Geeks Who Drink (2015)
- General Electric Guest House (1951)
- The Generation Gap (1969)
  - My Generation (1998)
- Generation Gap (2022–2023)
- Genius Junior (2018)
- Get a Clue (2020-2021)
- Get Rich Quick (1948)
- Get the Message (1964)
- Give and Take (1944–1945, 1951–1953)
- Give-n-Take (1975)
- Glamour Girl (1953–1954)
- Go! (1983–1984)
- Go for the House (1948–1949)
- Go Lucky (1951)
- Golf for Swingers (1972)
- Good Listening (1943)
- Grand Slam (1946–1953)
- Grand Slam (2007; unrelated to above)
- Grandstand (1988–1989)
- The Great Day (1952–1953)
- Great Getaway Game (1990–1991)
- Greed (1999–2000)
- The Grudge Match (1991–1992)
- Guess Again (1951)
- Guess What (1952)
- Guess Where? (1939–1940)
- The Guinness Game (1979–1980)

=== H ===
- Haggis Baggis (1958–1959)
- Have a Heart (1955)
- He Said, She Said (1969–1970)
  - Tattletales (1974–1978, 1982–1984)
    - About Last Night (2022)
- Head Games (2009)
- Headline Chasers (1985–1986)
- Heart's Desire (1946–1948)
- Hellevator (2015–2016)
- Hey Yahoo! (2023)
- Hidden Agenda (2010)
- High Finance (1956)
- High Rollers (1974–1976, 1978–1980, 1987–1988)
- History IQ (2000–2001)
- Hit Man (1983)
- Hold Everything! (1990)
- Hold It Please (1949)
- Hold That Camera (1950; changed from a game show to a variety series shortly into the run)
- Hold That Note (1957)
- Hole in the Wall (2008–2009, 2010–2012)
- Holey Moley (2019–2022)
- Hollywood Calling (1949–1950)
- Hollywood Connection (1977–1978; pilot taped in 1975)
- The Hollywood Game (1992; began as a 1991 pilot hosted by Peter Allen)
- Hollywood Game Night (2013–2020)
- Hollywood Jackpot (1946–1947)
- **Hollywood Squares** (1966–1981, 1986–1989, 1998–2004, **2025–present**)
  - Storybook Squares (1976–1977)
  - Hip Hop Squares (2012, 2017–2019)
  - Nashville Squares (2019)
  - Celebrity Squares (2023–2024)
- Home Run Derby (1960, 2003–2004)
- Home Shopping Game (1987)
- The Honeymoon Race (1967)
- Hot Ones: The Game Show (2020)
- Hot Potato (1984)
- How Do You Rate? (1958)
- How Much Is Enough? (2008)
- How'm I Doin'? (1942)
- How's Your Mother-in-Law? (1967–1968)
- Hurl! (2008)
- The Hustler (2021)

=== I ===
- I Can See Your Voice (2020–2024)
- I Can't Believe You Said That (1998–1999)
- I'd Do Anything (2002–2005)
- Identify (1949)
- Identity (2006–2007)
- Idiot Savants (1996–1997)
- Idiotest (2014–2017)
- I'll Bet (1965)
  - It's Your Bet (1969–1973)
- I'll Buy That (1953–1954)
- Inquizition (1998–2001)
- Instant Recall (2010)
- It Could Be You (1956–1961)
- It Takes Two (1969–1970, 1997)
- It's About Time (1954)
- **It's Academic** (**1961–present**)
- It's Anybody's Guess (1977)
- It's a PCOVCAK (2014)
- It's in the Bag (WABD/NBC; 1950–1951, 1952)
- It's Up to You (1939)
- It's Worth What? (2011)
- It's Your Chance of a Lifetime (2000)
- It's Your Move (1967)
- IWitness (2017)

=== J ===
- Jackpot! (1974–1975, 1985–1988, 1989–1990; also two 1977 pilots titled The Riddlers and a 1984 pilot hosted by Nipsey Russell)
  - Hollywood Showdown (2000–2001)
- Jackpot Bowling (1959–1961)
- Jay Stewart's Fun Fair (1949, 1950–1951)
- **Jeopardy!** (1964–1975, 1978–1979, **1984–present**)
  - Super Jeopardy! (1990)
  - Rock & Roll Jeopardy! (1998–2001)
  - Sports Jeopardy! (2014–2016)
  - **Celebrity Jeopardy!** (**2022–present**)
  - **Pop Culture Jeopardy!** (**2024–present**)
- Joe Garagiola's Memory Game (1971)
- The Joker's Wild (1971, 1972–1975, 1977–1986, 1990–1991, 2017–2019)
- Judge for Yourself (1953–1954)
- Jumble: The Interactive Game (1994)
- Just Men! (1983)

=== K ===
- Kay Kyser's Kollege of Musical Knowledge (1939–1950) and its revival, College of Musical Knowledge (1954)
- Keep It in the Family (1957–1958)
- Keep Talking (1958–1960)
- Kelly's Courthouse (1944)
- Killer Karaoke (2012–2014)
- King of the Mountain (1990; one-off FOX special, American version of Takeshi's Castle)
  - Storm the Castle (1993; one-off CBS special)
- Knights and Warriors (1992–1993)
- Knockout (1977–1978)
- The Krypton Factor (1981)
- Kwik Witz (1995, 1996–1999; 1995 version was a "pilot season")

=== L ===
- Ladies Be Seated (1943–1950)
- Ladies Before Gentlemen (1951)
- Ladies Fair (1950, 1951–1954)
- The Last Word (1989–1990)
- Late Night Liars (2010)
- Lawyer Q (1947)
- Legends of the Hidden Temple (2021)
- Let's Ask America (2012–2015)
- Let's Bowl (circa 1998, 2001–2002)
- Let's Go Back (1991–1993)
- **Let's Make a Deal** / **Let’s Make a Deal Primetime** (1963–1977, 1980–1981, 1984–1986, 1990–1991, 2003, **2009–present**)
  - Big Deal (1996)
  - Trato Hecho (2005; Spanish version)
- Let's Play Reporter (1943)
- Let's Play Post Office (1965–1966)
- Let's Talk Hollywood (1948)
- Liars (1995)
- Liar's Club (1969, 1976–1979, 1988–1989)
- Lie Detectors (2015)
- Life Begins at Eighty (1950–1956; spinoff of Juvenile Jury)
- Life with Linkletter (1950–1952)
- **Lingo** (1987–1988, 2002–2007, 2011, **2023–present**)
- Lip Service (1992–1994)
- Lotería Loca (2023)
- Love Me, Love Me Not (1986–1987)
- Lucky 13 (2024)

=== M ===
- Made in America (1964)
- The Magnificent Marble Machine (1975–1976)
- Majority Rules (1996–1997)
- Make a Face (1961)
- Make Me Laugh (1958, 1979–1980, 1996–1998)
- Make That Spare (1960–1964, 1988)
- Mall Masters (2001)
- Master Minds (2019–2023; titled Best Ever Trivia Show in Season 1)
- **Match Game** (1962–1969, 1973–1979, 1979–1982, 1990–1991, 1998–1999, 2016–2021, **2025–present**)
  - Match Game PM (1975–1981)
- Match Game-Hollywood Squares Hour (1983–1984)
- Matches 'n Mates (1967–1968)
- Meet Your Match (1949–1950, 1952–1953)
- Melody Puzzles (1937–1938)
- Mental Samurai (2019–2021)
- Midnight Money Madness (2006)
- Midway (1952)
- Million Dollar Mile (2019)
- Million Dollar Mind Game (2011)
- Million Dollar Money Drop (2010–2011)
- The Million Second Quiz (2013)
- Mind of a Man (2014)
- Mindreaders (1979–1980)
- Minute to Win It (2010–2011, 2013–2014)
- The Misery Index (2019–2021)
- Missus Goes a Shopping (1941–1948)
  - This is the Missus (1948–1951)
- Mr. Adam and Mrs. Eve (1942–1943)
- The Moment of Truth (2008)
- **Money Hungry** (**2021–present**)
- The Money Maze (1974–1975; pilot titled The Moneymaze)
- Monopoly (1990)
  - Monopoly Millionaires' Club (2015–2016)
- Mother Knows Best (1949–1950)
- Mother's Day (1958–1959)
- The Movie Game (1969–1972)
- Movieland Quiz (1948)
- Murder Will Out (1945–1946)
- Music Bingo (1958–1960)
- Musical Chairs (CBS, 1975)
- My Dad Is Better Than Your Dad (2008)
- My GamesFever (2006–2007)
- My Kind of Town (2005)
- Mystery File (1950–1951)
  - QED (1951)

=== N–O ===
- Name Droppers (1969–1970)
- Name That Movie (1949)
- **Name That Tune** (1952–1959, 1970–1971, 1974–1981, 1984–1985, **2021–present**)
  - Name That Video (2001)
- Name the Place (1939)
- National Bingo Night (2007)
  - Bingo America (2008–2009)
- National Lampoon's Funny Money (2003)
- The Neighbors (1975–1976)
- Nitro! (1995)
- Noah Webster Says (1942–1943, 1945)
- Now You See It (1974–1975, 1989; also a 1985 pilot hosted by Jack Clark)
- Number Please (1961)
- Números Rojos (2000; Spanish-language game show)
- The Object Is... (1963–1964)
- Oblivious (2002–2004)
- Oh My Word (1965–1967) and its revival, Take My Word For It! (1982–1983)
- Okay, Mother (1948–1951)
- On the Beat (2001)
- On the Cover (2004–2005)
- On Your Account (1953–1956)
- On Your Way (1953–1954; became a variety show later in its run)
- One Minute Please (1954–1955)

=== P ===
- Paging the Judge (1953–1954)
- Pantomime Quiz (1947–1959)
  - Stump the Stars (1962–1963, 1964, 1969–1970)
  - Celebrity Charades (1979, 2005)
- Paranoia (2000)
- The Parent Game (1972–1973)
  - Wait 'til You Have Kids! (1996–1997)
- Party Line (1947)
- Pass the Buck (1978)
- Password (1961–1967, 1971–1975; called Password All-Stars from 1974 to 1975; **2022–present**)
  - Password Plus (1979–1982)
  - Super Password (1984–1989)
  - Million Dollar Password (2008–2009)
- Pawnography (2014–2015)
- Pay Cards! (1968–1969) and its revival, Super Pay Cards! (1981–1982)
- Pay It Off (2009–2010)
- Payroll Party (1952)
- PDQ (1965–1969)
  - Baffle (1973–1974; called All-Star Baffle toward the end of the run)
- Penny to a Million (1955)
- People are Funny (1942–1960, 1984; radio-only until 1954, TV-only from 1960)
- People Puzzler (2021–2023)
- People Will Talk (1963)
- The People's Rally (1938–1939)
- **The Perfect Line** (**2025–present**)
- The Perfect Match (ESPN, 1994)
- Personality Puzzle (1953; began as a prime time special)
- Person, Place or Thing (2023–2025)
- The Phrase That Pays (1953–1955)
- Pick a Date (1949–1950)
- Pictionary (Adults)
  - Pictionary (1997–1998)
  - Pictionary (2022–2025)
- Picture This (1963)
- Pitfall (1981–1982)
- Place the Face (1953–1955)
- Play for a Billion (2003)
- Play the Game (1946, 1948)
- Play the Percentages (1980)
- Play Your Hunch (1958–1963)
- Play2Win (2006–2007)
- PlayCafe (2007–2008; originally called LiveFire until October 2007)
- PlayMania (2006–2007)
  - 100 Winners (2007)
  - Quiznation (2007)
- Plugged (2002–2007)
- The Pop 'N Rocker Game (1983–1984)
- Pop Quiz Hotshot (2015)
- Pot o' Gold (1939–1941, 1946–1947)
- Power of 10 (2007–2008)
- Pressure Cooker (1998)
- The Price Is Right (NBC/ABC, 1956–1965)
  - **The Price Is Right** (CBS, **1972–present**)
    - The (Nighttime) Price Is Right (Syndicated; 1972–1980, 1985–1986)
    - The New Price Is Right (1994–1995)
    - **The Price Is Right at Night** (**2019–present**)
- Prime Games (1994–1997)
- Pro-Fan (1977)
- Professor Quiz (1936–1941, 1946–1948; broadcasting's first true quiz show)
- Professor Yes 'n' No (1953)
- Public Prosecutor (1951)

=== Q–R ===
- Queen for a Day (1945–1964, 1969–1970; radio-only until 1948, TV-only from 1957)
- Quick as a Flash (1944–1951, 1953–1954; radio-only through 1951)
- Quick on the Draw (1952)
- Quicksilver (1939–1940)
- Quicksilver (1994–1995; unrelated to above)
- Quixie Doodles (1939–1941)
- The Quiz Kids Challenge (1990; loosely based on Quiz Kids)
- The Quiz of Two Cities (1944–1947)
- **The Quiz with Balls** (**2024–present**)
- Quizzer's Baseball (1941)
- **Raid the Cage** (**2023–present**)
- Random Acts of Comedy (1999–2001)
- Rate Your Mate (1950–1951)
- Reach for the Stars (1967)
- Ready... Set... Cook! (1995–2001)
- The Rebus Game (1965)
- Red Benson's Movie Matinee (1946–1947, 1948–1949)
- The Reel Game (1971)
- The Reel-to-Reel Picture Show (1998)
- Remember This? (1996–1997)
- Remember this Date (1950–1951)
- RFD America (1947–1948, 1949)
- Remote Control (1987–1990)
- Repo Games (2011–2012)
- Rhyme and Reason (1975–1976)
- The Rich List (2006) and its revival, The Money List (2009)
- Rodeo Drive (1990; began as a 1981 pilot for CBS with Peter Tomarken hosting)
- Rumor Has It (1993)
- **RuPaul's Drag Race** (**2009–present**)
  - **RuPaul's Drag Race: All Stars** (**2012–present**)
- Russian Roulette (2002–2003)

=== S ===
- Sábado Gigante (1962–2015; Spanish-language game show, moved to Miami in 1985)
- Sale of the Century (1969–1974, 1983–1989)
  - Temptation (Syndicated, 2007–2008)
- Sandblast (1994–1996)
- Save to Win (2016–2017)
- Say It with Acting (1951–1952)
- Say When!! (1961–1965)
- Scattergories (1993)
- **Scrabble** (1984–1990, 1993, **2024–present**)
- Scramby Amby (1943–1945, 1946–1947; only broadcast on the West Coast until 1944)
- Second Chance (NBC Radio, 1953–1955)
- Second Chance (ABC-TV, 1977)
  - **Press Your Luck** (1983–1986, **2019–present**)
    - Whammy! The All-New Press Your Luck (2002–2003)
- Second Honeymoon (1987–1988)
- Separation Anxiety (2016)
- Set for Life (2007)
- Seven Keys (1960–1965; KTLA-only from 1960 to 1961 and 1964 to 1965)
- Sex Wars (2000–2001)
- Shoot for the Stars (1977; filmed two pilots in 1976 called Shoot the Works)
  - Double Talk (1986; called Celebrity Double Talk towards the end of the run)
- Shop 'til You Drop (1991–1994, 1996–1998, 2000–2002, 2003–2005)
- Shopper's Casino (1987)
- The Shopping Game (circa 1982)
- Shopping Spree (1996–1998)
- Show Me the Money (2006)
- Show Us Your Wits (2009)
- Showdown (1966)
- Showoffs (1975)
  - Body Language (1984–1986)
- Shuffle: The Interactive Game (1994)
- Silent Library (2009–2011)
- Sing for Your Dough (1942)
- Sing for Your Supper (1949)
- Sing It Again (1948–1951)
- The Singing Bee (2007, 2009–2012)
- Singo (1944)
- Small Talk (1996–1997)
- Small Fortune (2021)
- The Smarter Sex (1995)
- Smush (2001)
- Snake Oil (2023)
- Snap Decision (2017–2019)
- Snap Judgment (1967–1969; adapted Password's format in late 1968)
- So You Think You Know Music (1939–1941, 1945–1946)
- South of Wilshire (2016)
- Sparring Partners (1949)
- Spend a Million (1954–1955)
- Spin-Off (1975)
- Spin the Picture (1949–1950)
- Spin the Wheel (2019)
- Spin to Win (1949)
- Split Personality (1959–1960)
- Split Second (1972–1975, 1986–1987, 2023–2024)
- Sports Challenge (1971–1979)
- Sports Snapshot! (1993)
- Star Games (1985–1986)
- Starcade (1982–1984)
- Starface (2006)
- Stop or Go (1944–1945)
- Stop That Villain (1944)
- Stop the Music (1949–1956)
- Street Smarts (2000–2005)
- Strike It Rich (CBS/NBC, 1947–1958; radio-only until 1951, TV-only from 1957)
- Strike It Rich (Syndicated, 1986–1987; called The All-New Strike It Rich in-show)
- Strip Poker (1999–2000)
- Studio 7 (2004)
- Stump the Schwab (2004–2006)
- Stumpers! (1976)
- Super Bingo (1967)
- Super Ghost (1952–1953)
- Supermarket Sweep (1965–1967, 1990–1995, 2000–2003, 2020–2022)
- Surprise Package (1950)
- Switch (2023–2024)

=== T ===
- Taboo (2002)
- Tag the Gag (1951)
- Take a Card (1943)
- Take a Chance (1950)
- Take a Number (1948–1955)
- Take the Cake (2007)
- Take It or Leave It (1940–1952; renamed The $64 Question in 1950)
  - The $64,000 Question (1955–1958) and its spin-off, The $64,000 Challenge (1956–1958)
    - The $128,000 Question (1976–1978)
- Take It All (2012)
- Take Two (1963)
- Talent Jackpot (1949)
- Talk About (1989–1990)
- Temptation (KTLA/ABC; circa 1960–1962, 1967–1968)
- Texaco Star National Academic Championship (1989–1994)
- Thanks to the Yanks (1942–1944)
  - The Bob Hawk Show (1943–1953)
- That **** Quiz Show (1982)
- That's My Dog (1991–1995)
- **That's My Jam** (**2022–present**)
- That's the Question (2006–2008)
- There's One in Every Family (1952–1953)
- They're Off (1949)
- Think Twice (1994)
- This Amazing America (1940)
- Three for the Money (1948)
- Three on a Match (1971–1974)
- **Tic-Tac-Dough** (1956–1959, 1978–1986, 1990–1991, **2025–present**)
- Time Machine (1985)
- Time's a Wastin' (1948)
  - Beat the Clock (c. 1949; unrelated to above)
- The Titan Games (2019–2020)
- Title Tales (1940)
- To Say the Least (1977–1978)
- TKO: Total Knock Out (2018)
- Top Card (1989–1993)
- Top Dollar (1958–1959)
- Total Blackout (2012–2013)
- Trashed (1994)
- Treasure Hunt starring Jan Murray (1956–1959)
  - The New Treasure Hunt (1973–1977, 1981–1982; latter version was simply called Treasure Hunt)
- Treasure Isle (1967–1968)
- Triple Threat (1988–1989, 1992–1993; latter version was called BET's Triple Threat)
- Trivia Track (1997–1998)
- Trivia Trap (1984–1985)
- Trivia Unwrapped (2003–2005)
- **Trivial Pursuit** (**2024–present**)
- Trivial Pursuit: The Interactive Game (1993)
  - ESPN Trivial Pursuit (2004)
  - Trivial Pursuit: America Plays (2008–2009)
- True or False (1938–1943, 1948–1949, 1950–1951, 1953–1956)
- Trump Card (1990–1991)
- Truth or Consequences (1940–1975, 1977–1978, 1987–1988; radio-only until 1950 [except for a one-time experimental TV broadcast]; TV only from 1956)
- Try and Do It (1948)
- Tug of Words (2021–2023)
- Turn It Up! (1990)
- TV Land's Ultimate Fan Search (1999–2000)
- TV Powww (circa 1980s; many local versions)
- Twenty-One (1956–1958, 2000; also a 1982 pilot hosted by Jim Lange)
- Two for the Money (1952–1957)

=== U–V ===
- Ultimate Fan League (1998)
- Ultimate Tag (2020)
- Uncle Jim's Question Bee (1936–1941)
- Uno Nunca Sabe (1988–1990)
- Up To Paar (1952)
- USA Gonzo Games (1991–1992)
- Video Village (1960–1962)
- The Video Game (1984–1985)

=== W ===
- **Wait Wait... Don't Tell Me!** (**1998–present**; radio series aired on NPR)
- Walk a Mile (1952–1954)
- **The Wall** (**2016–present**)
- **Weakest Link** (2001–2003, **2020–present**)
- webRIOT (1999)
- Wedding Day (1981)
- Wedding Party (1968)
- What Do You Have in Common? (1954)
- (Guess) What Happened? (1951)
- What Makes You Tick? (1948–1949, 1950–1951)
- What Would You Have Done? (1940)
- What's My Name? (1938–1949)
- What's the Name of That Song? (1943–1948)
- What's This Song? (1964–1965)
  - Win With the Stars (1968–1969)
- What's Your Bid? (1953)
- The Wheel (2022)
- Wheel of Fortune (1952–1953)
- Wheel of Fortune (NBC/CBS; 1975–1991; began as a 1973 pilot called Shopper's Bazaar hosted by Chuck Woolery, then a pair of 1974 pilots hosted by Edd Byrnes)
  - **Wheel of Fortune** (Syndicated, **1983–present**)
  - **Celebrity Wheel of Fortune** (**2021–present**)
- Whew! (1979–1980; called Celebrity Whew! beginning in November 1979)
- Which is Which? (1944–1945)
- Whiz Quiz (1948)
- **Who Wants to Be a Millionaire** (1999–2002, 2002–2019, **2020–present**)
  - Who Wants to Be a Super Millionaire (2004)
  - Who Wants to Be a Millionaire? 10th-Anniversary Celebration (2009)
- The Who, What, or Where Game (1969–1974)
  - The Challengers (1990–1991)
- Who-Dun-It? (1948)
- Whodunnit? (1979)
- Whose Line Is It Anyway? (1999–2004, 2005–2007, **2013–present**; continuation of the British version)
  - Drew Carey's Green Screen Show (2004, 2005)
  - Drew Carey's Improv-A-Ganza (2011)
  - Trust Us with Your Life (2012; currently on hiatus)
- Who Knows You Best (2000)
- Who's Still Standing? (2011–2012)
- Wild West Showdown (1994–1995)
- Win Ben Stein's Money (1997–2003)
- Win, Lose or Draw (1987–1990)
- Win with a Winner (1958)
- Window Shopping (1962)
- Wingo (1958)
- Winner Take All (1946–1952)
- Winning Lines (2000)
- Winning Streak (1974–1975)
- Winsanity (2016–2018)
- WinTuition (2002–2004)
- Wipeout (Syndicated, 1988–1989)
- Wipeout (ABC, 2008–2014)
- **Wipeout** (TBS, **2021–present**)
- The Wizard of Odds (1973–1974)
- Word for Word (1963–1964)
- Wordplay (1986–1987)
- Words and Music (1970–1971)

=== Y ===
- Yahtzee (1988)
- You Bet Your Life (1947–1961, 1980–1981, 1992–1993, 2021–2023; radio-only until 1950, TV-only from 1960)
  - Tell It to Groucho (1962)
- You Deserve It (2011)
- You Don't Know Jack (2001)
- You Don't Say! (1963–1969, 1975, 1978–1979; began as a local series on KTLA in 1962, hosted by Jack Barry)
- Your Lucky Clue (1952)
- Your Number's Up (1985)
- Your Surprise Package (1961–1962)
- Your Surprise Store (1952)
- You're on Your Own (1956–1957)
- You're the Expert (1951)
- Yours for a Song (1961–1963)
- Youth vs. Age (1939–1940)

== Panel games ==
=== #–H ===
- The $1.98 Beauty Show (1978–1980)
- 3rd Degree (1989–1990)
- @midnight (2013–2017)
- The Ad-Libbers (1951)
- Are You Positive (1952)
- Author, Author (1939–1940)
- Back That Fact (1953)
- Can You Top This? (1940–1954, 1970)
- The Cliché Club (1950)
- Down You Go (1951–1956; one of the few shows to air on the then-four major broadcast networks [ABC, CBS, DuMont, NBC])
- The Eyes Have It (CBS, 1948–1949; also called Stop, Look and Listen and Riddle Me This during its run)
  - Celebrity Time (1949–1952)
- The Eyes Have It (NBC, 1948–1949)
- General Electric Guest House (1951)
- The Gong Show (1976–1980, 1988–1989, 2017–2018)
  - Extreme Gong (1998–1999)
  - The Gong Show with Dave Attell (2008)
- Happy Hour (1999)
- High-Low (1957)

=== I–O ===
- Information Please (1938–1948, 1952)
- It Pays to Be Ignorant (1942–1950, 1951, 1973–1974)
- It's News to Me (1951–1953, 1954)
- I've Got a Secret (1952–1967, 1972–1973, 1976, 2000–2003, 2006)
- Laugh Line (1959)
- Let's See (1955)
- Let's Talk Hollywood (1948)
- Letters to Laugh-In (1969)
- Life Begins at Eighty (1950–1956; spinoff of Juvenile Jury)
- Lucky Partners (1958)
- Majority Rules (1949–1950)
- Make the Connection (1955)
- Masquerade Party (1952–1960, 1974–1975)
- Missing Links (1963–1964)
- The Movie Masters (1989–1990)
- Musical Chairs (NBC, 1953–1955)
- The Name's the Same (1951–1955)
- The News Hole (1994)
- No Relation (1996)
- On the Spot (2014–TBD)
- One in a Million (1967)
- One Minute Please (1954–1955)

=== P–S ===
- Personality (1967–1969)
- QED (1951)
- Quizzing the News (1948–1949)
- Relatively Speaking (1988–1989)
- Riddle Me This (1948–1949)
- Says You! (1988)
- So You Think You Got Troubles?! (1982–1983)
- S.R.O. (1953)
- Stop Me If You've Heard This One (1939–1940, 1947–1949)

=== T–Y ===
- Tag the Gag (1951)
- Take a Good Look (1959–1961)
- Take a Guess (1953)
- Think Fast (ABC, 1949–1950)
- To Tell the Truth (1956–1968, 1969–1978, 1980–1981, 1990–1991, 2000–2002, 2016–2022)
  - You Lie Like a Dog (2000; Animal Planet version of To Tell The Truth)
- Transatlantic Quiz (1944–1945)
- Twenty Questions (1946–1955; also a 1975 pilot hosted by Jack Clark)
- Wanna Bet? (2008)
- We Interrupt This Week (1978–1979)
- **We Are Family** (**Premieres in 2024**)
- We Take Your Word (1950–1951)
- What in the World? (1951–1955)
- What's Going On (1954)
- What's It For? (1957–1958)
- What's My Line? (1950–1967, 1968–1975)
- What's the Story (1951–1955)
- Where Have You Been? (1954–1955)
- Where Was I? (1952–1953)
- Who Said That? (1948–1954, 1955)
- Who's the Boss? (1954)
  - Who Pays? (1959)
- Who's There (1952)
- Who's Whose (1951)
- Why? (1953)
- With This Ring (1951)
- Without Prejudice? (2007)
- Would I Lie to You? (2022)
- Your First Impression (1962–1964; began as a 1961 pilot called First Impressions)
- You're in the Picture (1961)
- You're Putting Me On (1969)

== Dating/relationship ==
=== #–B ===
- 3's a Crowd (1979–1980) and its revival, All-New 3's a Crowd (2000–2002)
- The 5th Wheel (2001–2004)
- 12 Corazones (2004–2017)
  - 12 Corazones: Rumbo al Altar (2006–2012)
- **12 Dates of Christmas** (**2020–present**)
- **90 Day Fiancé: Love Games** (**2020–present**; competitive spinoff of 90 Day Fiancé)
- Age of Love (2007)
- The Amateur's Guide to Love (1972)
- Anniversary Game (1969–1970)
- Anything for Love (2003)
- **Are You the One?** (**2014–present**)
- **Are You the One: All-Star Challenge** (**2017–present**)
- Average Joe (2003–2005)
- **The Bachelor** (**2002–present**)
  - **The Bachelorette** (2003–2005, **2008–present**)
  - Bachelor Pad (2010–2012)
  - **Bachelor in Paradise** (**2014–present**)
  - The Bachelor Winter Games (2018)
- Baggage (2010–2012)
- Bedroom Buddies (1992)
- Bedtime Stories (1979)
- The Big Date (1996–1997)
- Big Man on Campus (2004–2005)
- The Bill Gwinn Show (1951–1952)
- The Blame Game (1999–2000)
- Blind Date (1943–1946, 1949–1951, 1952)
  - Your Big Moment (1953)
- **Blind Date** (Syndicated/Bravo; 1999–2006, 2019–2020)
- The Boot (2008)
- Boy Meets Boy (2003)
- Bridal Bootcamp (2010)
- Bride and Groom (1945–1950, 1951–1954, 1957–1958)
- Burt Luddin's Love Buffet (1999–2001)
- Bzzz! (1996–1997)

=== C–E ===
- Catching Kelce (2016)
- CelebriDate (2011–2012)
- Chains of Love (2001)
- Chance for Romance (1958)
- Change of Heart (1998–2003)
- The Choice (2012)
- The Cougar (2009)
- **The Courtship** (2022)
- Coupled (2016)
- Crush (2000)
- Cupid (2003)
- Date My Mom (2004–2006)
- Date Plate (2003–2004)
- Dating Factory (2006)
- The Dating Game and The New Dating Game (1965–1973, 1973–1974, 1978–1980, 1986–1989, 1996–1999)
- Dating in the Dark (2009–2010)
- Dating Naked (2014–2016)
- Disaster Date (2009–2011)
- DisMissed (2001)
- Driven to Love (2016–2017)
- ElimiDate (2001–2006)
  - ElimiDate Deluxe (2001)
- Ex on the Beach (2018–2023)
- Ex-treme Dating (2002–2004)
- Excused (2011–2013)
- Exposed (2006–2007)

=== F–G ===
- Fake-A-Date (2004)
- Farmer Wants a Wife (2008)
- Finding Prince Charming (2016)
- Fire Island (2017)
- First Dates (2017)
- Flavor of Love (2006–2008)
  - I Love New York (2007–2008)
    - Real Chance of Love (2008–2009)
- Flirty Dancing (2019–2020)
- For Love or Money (2003–2004)
- For the Love of Ray J (2009–2010)
- Four Weddings (2009–2014)
- Foursome (2006–2011)
- Frank The Entertainer...In A Basement Affair (2010)
- Friends or Lovers (2000)
- Game of Clones (2019)
- The Game of Dating (2017)
- Gay, Straight or Taken? (2007)
- Get the Hook-Up (2004)
- Girl Meets Cowboy (2007)

=== H–K ===
- Hell Date (2007–2008)
- Here Come the Newlyweds (2008–2009)
- Honeymoon in New York (1945–1947)
- The Hook Up (2013)
- Hot Seat (1976)
- I Wanna Date a Race Car Driver (2004)
- I Wanna Marry "Harry" (2014)
- Infatuation (1992–1993)
- Is She Really Going Out with Him? (2009–2010)
- It Pays To Be Married (1953–1955)
- It Takes a Church (2014–2015)
- Joe Millionaire (2003, 2022)
- The Joe Schmo Show (2003–2004, 2013)
- Kiss and Make Up (1946)

=== L–M ===
- Labor of Love (2020)
- The Last Resort (2002–2003)
- The Littlest Groom (2004)
- Love at First Sight (1992)
- Love Between the Sexes (1992–1993)
- Love Connection (1983–1994, 1998–1999, 2017–2018)
- Love Cruise (2001)
- The Love Experts (1978–1979)
- Love Games: Bad Girls Need Love Too (2010–2013, spinoff of Bad Girls Club)
- Love in the Wild (2011–2012)
- **Love is Blind** (**2020–present**)
- **Love Island** (**2019–present**)
- Love Story (1955–1956)
- Love Triangle (2011)
- Lover or Loser (2000–2001)
- The Man (2012–2013)
- Married by America (2003)
- Match Made in Heaven (2015–2016)
- Match Mistress (2008)
- The Match Off (2010)
- Matchmaker (1987–1988)
- Meet My Folks (2002–2003)
- Meet or Delete (2006–2007)
- Mr. Personality (2003)
- Momma's Boys (2008–2009)
- More to Love (2009)
- Moving In (2010)
- My Antonio (2009)
- My Own (2006–2007)

=== N–R ===
- Next (2005–2008)
- The Newlywed Game and The New Newlywed Game (1966–1974, 1977–1980, 1984, 1985–1989, 1996–1999, 2009–2013)
- Night Games (1991–1992)
- Ochocinco: The Ultimate Catch (2010)
- Outback Jack (2004)
- Paradise Hotel (2003, 2008)
  - Forever Eden (2004)
- Parental Control (2005–2010)
- The Perfect Match (1967–1968)
- Perfect Match (1986; unrelated to above)
- A Perfect Score (1992)
- Perfect Score (2013; unrelated to above)
- Personals (1991–1992)
- The Pickup Artist (2007–2008)
- Playboy's Love & Sex Test (1992–1994)
- The Player (2004)
- Playing It Straight (2004)
- The Proposal (2018)
- Ready for Love (2013)
- Rendez-View (2001–2002)
- Rock of Love with Bret Michaels (2007–2009)
  - Daisy of Love (2009)
  - Megan Wants a Millionaire (2009)
- Room Raiders (2003–2009)

=== S–Y ===
- Score (2005–2007)
- Second Honeymoon (1948–1950; began as a test run on WAAT in 1947)
- Seducing Cindy (2010)
- She's Got Game (2015)
- Shipmates (2001–2003)
- A Shot at Love with Tila Tequila (2007–2008)
  - That's Amore! (2008)
  - A Double Shot at Love (2008–2009; third season of A Shot at Love)
- Singled Out (1995–1998)
- Star Dates (2002–2003)
- Straight to the Heart (1989)
- Street Match (1993)
- Studs (1991–1993)
- Swaps (1995–1996)
- Sweet Home Alabama (2011–2014)
- Sweethearts (1988–1989)
- TailDaters (2002–2003)
- Take Me Out (2012)
- Temptation Island (2001, 2003)
- That's Amore (1992–1993)
- Three Blind Dates (1996–1997)
- **Too Hot to Handle** (**2020–present**)
- Tough Love (2009–2013)
- Transamerican Love Story (2008)
- Two in Love (1954)
- The Ultimate Love Test (2004)
- Wanna Come In? (2004–2005)
- Wedding Party (1968)
- Who Wants to Date a Comedian? (2011–TBD)
- Who Wants to Marry a Multi-Millionaire? (2000; one-off special)
- Who Wants to Marry My Dad? (2003–2004)
- A Wicked Offer (2015)
- With This Ring (1951)
- The X Effect (2006–2008)
- You Rock, Let's Roll (2008)

== Kids and teens ==
=== A–C ===
- Adventure Camp (2003, 2008)
- Animal Planet Zooventure (1997–1998)
- Baby Races (1993–1994)
- Beat the Clock (2018–2019)
- Best Friend's Date (2004–2005)
- Bet on Your Baby (2013–2014)
- Bible Bowl (1970s–1980s)
- BrainRush (2009)
- Brains & Brawn (1993)
- BrainSurge (2009–2011; became Family BrainSurge in 2011)
- Campus Hoopla (1946–1947)
- Choose Up Sides (1953, 1956)
- Chopped Junior (2015–2019)
- Click (1997–1999)
- Contraption (1983–1988, 1989)
- The Crystal Maze (2020)

=== D–E ===
- Dance Revolution (2006–2007)
- Design Squad (2007–2009)
- Destroy Build Destroy (2009–2011)
- Discovery Kids Zap It! (1998–2000)
- Do You Know? (1963–1964)
- The Dr. Fad Show (1988–1994)
- Dr. I.Q. Jr. (1941, 1948–1949; children's version of Dr. I.Q.; also a 1953 pilot)
- Double Dare (Nickelodeon, 1986–1990, 2018–2019)
  - Super Sloppy Double Dare (1987, 1989)
  - Family Double Dare (1988, 1990–1993)
  - Super Special Double Dare (1992)
  - Double Dare 2000 (2000)
- Double Up (1992; children's variant on The Dating Game)
- Endurance (2002–2008)

=== F–H ===
- Family Challenge (1995–1997; renamed The New Family Challenge for Season 2)
- Family Game Night (2010–2014)
- Fetch! with Ruff Ruffman (2006–2010)
- Figure It Out (1997–1998, 2012–2013)
  - Figure It Out: Family Style (1998)
  - Figure It Out: Wild Style (1999)
- Finders Keepers (1987–1989)
- Food Network Star Kids (2016)
- Fort Boyard: Ultimate Challenge (2011–2012)
- Fun House (1988–1991)
- Funny Boners (1954–1955; children's version of Truth or Consequences)
- The Game of Life (2011–2012)
- Game Parade (1942–1943)
- Genius Junior (2017–2018)
- Get the Picture (1991)
- Giant Step (1956–1957)
- Girls v. Boys (2003–2005)
- Gladiators 2000 (1994–1996; children's version of American Gladiators)
- Go For It! TV (2001, 2002)
- Grand-Prix All Star Show (1982–1983)
- Great Pretenders (1999–2001)
- Hail the Champ (1952–1953)

=== I–M ===
- I'm Telling! (1987–1988)
- It's a Hit (1957)
- Jep! (1998–1999; children's version of Jeopardy!)
- Joker! Joker! Joker! (1979–1981; children's version of The Joker's Wild)
- Junior Almost Anything Goes (1976–1977)
- Junior Junction (1946–1952)
- The Junior Pyramid (1979; one-week children's version of The $20,000 Pyramid)
  - All-Star Junior Pyramid (1979; ABC primetime special)
  - Junior Partner Pyramid (1979; six-week daytime version)
  - Celebrity Junior Pyramid (1979; one-week event directly following the Junior Partner era)
- Juvenile Jury (1947–1954, 1970–1971, 1983–1984, 1989–1991)
- Keep It Spotless (2018)
- Kids Baking Championship (2015–)
- Kids BBQ Championship (2016–2017)
- Kids on the Move (1998–2000)
- The Krypton Factor (1990–1991)
- Legends of the Hidden Temple (1993–1995, 2021-2022)
- Mad Libs (1998–1999)
- Make a Face (1962)
- Make the Grade (1989–1991)
- The March of Games (1938–1941)
- Masters of the Maze (1994–1996)
- Maximum Drive (1994)
- Moolah Beach (2001)

=== N–R ===
- Nick Arcade (1992–1993; Season 1 taped in December 1991)
- Nick or Treat! (1985–2002)
- Nickelodeon Guts (1992–1994)
  - Global Guts (1995)
  - My Family's Got Guts (2008–2009)
- The Noise (2017–2018)
- Off the Wall (1998–1999)
- On Your Mark (1961)
- Operation Junkyard (2002–2003)
- Peer Pressure (1997–1998; reran as Pressure 2 from 1999 to 2000)
  - Pressure 1 (1999–2000; mostly unrelated to Pressure 2)
- Pick Your Brain (1993–1994)
- Pictionary (1989)
- Pictureka! (2010–2011)
- The Pop 'N Rocker Game (1983–1984)
- Puttin' on the Kids (1986–1987; children's version of Puttin' on the Hits)
- Quiz Kids (1940–1953, 1956, 1978, 1981–1982; radio-only until 1949, TV-only from 1953)
- Rachael Ray's Kids Cook-Off (2015)
- Runaround (1972–1973)

=== S–V ===
- Scaredy Camp (2002–2003)
- Scrabble Showdown (2011–2012)
- Scramble (1993–1994)
- Secrets of the Cryptkeeper's Haunted House (1996–1997)
- Skedaddle (1988)
- Slime Time (1988; usually paired with Treasure Mall during its run)
- Slime Time Live (2000–2003)
- Sponk! (2001–2003; children's version of Whose Line Is It Anyway?)
- Storybook Squares (1969; children's version of Hollywood Squares)
- Teen Win, Lose or Draw (1989–1992)
- Think Fast (Nickelodeon, 1989–1991)
- Thousand Dollar Bee (2004–2007)
- Tooned In (2021)
- Top Chef Junior (2017–2018)
- Treasure Mall (1988; usually paired with Slime Time during its run)
- Video Power (1991–1992; had previously been a live-action/cartoon hybrid with no game show elements from 1990 to 1991)
- Video Village Jr. (1961–1962; children's version of Video Village)
  - Shenanigans (1964–1965)
- Virtual Memory (2000–2011)

=== W–Y ===
- Way Out Games (1976–1977)
- Webheads (2014)
- What Would You Do? (1991–1993)
- Wheel 2000 (1997–1998; children's version of Wheel of Fortune)
- Where in the World Is Carmen Sandiego? (1991–1995)
  - Where in Time Is Carmen Sandiego? (1996–1998)
- Wild & Crazy Kids (1990–1992, 2002)
- Wild Animal Games (1995–1996)
- **WOW: The CatholicTV Challenge** (2004–2007, **2008–present**)
- You're On! (1998–1999)

== Reality television ==
=== #–A ===
- 13: Fear is Real (2009)
- 30 Seconds to Fame (2002–2003)
- 72 Hours (2013)
- **Alter Ego** (**2021–present**)
- **The Amazing Race** (**2001–present**)
- American Inventor (2006–2007)
- American Tarzan (2016)
- America's Best Dance Crew (2008–2012, 2015)
- **America's Funniest Home Videos** (**1989–present**)
  - America's Funniest People (1990–1994)
  - The Planet's Funniest Animals (1999–2008)
    - Funniest Pets & People (2006–2008)
- **America's Got Talent** (2006–present)
  - America's Got Talent: The Champions (2019–2020)
  - America's Got Talent: Extreme (2022)
  - America's Got Talent: All-Stars (2023)
  - America's Got Talent: Fantasy League (2024)
- The Apprentice (2004–2007, 2010)
  - The Apprentice: Martha Stewart (2005)
  - The Celebrity Apprentice (2008–2010, 2011–2017)
  - The Ultimate Merger (2010–2011)

=== B–C ===
- Battle of the Bods (2007–2009)
- Beat the Chefs (2012)
- Beauty and the Geek (2005–2008)
- The Benefactor (2004)
- Best Time Ever with Neil Patrick Harris (2015)
- **The Big Big Show** (**2015–present**)
- **Big Brother** (**2000–present**)
  - Celebrity Big Brother (2018–2019, 2022)
- The Biggest Loser (2004–2016, 2020)
- Billion Dollar Buyer (2016–2018)
- Boot Camp (2001)
- Bridalplasty (2010–2011)
- Bullrun (2007–2010)
- By Popular Demand (1950)
- Cannonball Run 2001 (2001)
- Caroline & Friends (2018)
- Castaways (2018)
- Catch It Keep It (2009)
- **The Challenge** (**1998–present**; formerly Real World/Road Rules Challenge)
- Chance of a Lifetime (1952–1956)
- The Code Room (2004–2006)
- Combat Missions (2002)
- The Contender (2005–2009)
- Culinary Genius (2017–present)

=== D–H ===
- Dance 360 (2004–2005)
- Dance Fever (Syndicated, 1979–1987)
  - Dance Fever (ABC Family, 2003)
- **Dancing with the Stars** (**2005–present**)
  - Dancing with the Stars: Juniors (2018)
  - Dance War: Bruno vs. Carrie Ann (2008)
- **Deal or No Deal Island** (**2024–2025**)
- **Destination X** (**2025–present**)
- **Domino Masters** (**2022–present**)
- Drop the Mic (2017–2019)
- Escape the Night (2016–2019)
- Fake Off (2014–2015)
- Fame (2004)
- Family Food Fight (2019)
- The Family (2003)
- Fantasy (1982–1983)
- Fear Factor (2001–2006, 2011–2012, 2017–2018)
- Food Network Star (2005–2018)
- Games People Play (1980–1981)
- Gana la Verde (2004–2005; Spanish-language game show)
- The Girl in My Life (1973–1974)
- The Greatest Man on Earth (1952–1953)
- Guilty or Innocent (1984)
- Guinness World Records Primetime (1998–2001)
- **Hell's Kitchen** (**2005–present**)
- Hip Hop Hold 'Em (2006)

=== I–N ===
- I Bet You (2007–2008; third season recorded, but not aired)
- I Survived a Japanese Game Show (2008–2009)
- I'd Do Anything (2004)
- I'm a Celebrity...Get Me Out of Here! (2003, 2009)
- King of the Jungle (2003–2004)
- **Lip Sync Battle** (**2015–present**)
- Live Like a Millionaire (1950–1953)
- Lost (2001)
- Mad Mad House (2004)
- Making It (2018–2021)
- The Masked Dancer (2020–2021)
- **The Masked Singer** (**2019–present**)
- **MasterChef** (**2010–present**)
- **MasterChef Junior** (**2013–present**)
- **Million Dollar Secret** (**2025–present**)
- Model Citizens (2004)
- The Mole (2001–2004, 2008, 2022; changed to Celebrity Mole from 2003 to 2004)
- Murder in Small Town X (2001)
- My Big Fat Obnoxious Fiance (2004)
  - My Big Fat Obnoxious Boss (2004)
- The Next Great Champ (2005)
- **Next Level Chef** (**2022–present**)

=== O–S ===
- The Original Amateur Hour (1948–1954, 1955–1957, 1959–1970, 1992)
- Pirate Master (2004)
- Pussycat Dolls Present (2007–2008)
  - Pussycat Dolls Present: The Search for the Next Doll (2007)
  - Pussycat Dolls Present: Girlicious (2008)
- Puttin' on the Hits (1984–1988)
  - Puttin' on the Kids (1986–1987)
- **Rat in the Kitchen** (**2022–present**)
- The Real Gilligan's Island (2004–2005)
- Reality Bites Back (2008)
- Road Rules (1995–2004, 2007)
- The Runner (2016)
- **RuPaul's Drag Race** (2009–present)
  - **RuPaul's Drag Race: All Stars** (2012–present)
- **Scared Famous** (**2017–present**)
- Shear Genius (2007–2010)
- Siberia (2013)
- Skin Wars (2014–2016)
  - Skin Wars: Fresh Paint (2015, 2016)
- **The Snake** (**2025–present**)
- Solitary (2006–2010)
- Songs for Sale (1950–1952)
- Star Search (1983–1995, 2003–2004)
- Superstar USA (2004)
- **Survivor** (**2000–present**)
- The Swan (2004)

=== T–Y ===
- Talent Jackpot (1949)
- The Talent Shop (1951–1952)
- Top Shot (2010–2013)
- **The Traitors** (**2023–present**)
- Treasure Hunters (2006)
- **The Trust: A Game of Greed** (**2024–present**)
- **The Ultimate Fighter** (**2005–present**)
- The Ultimate Surfer (2021)
- Unan1mous (2006)
- Under One Roof (2002)
- Wanna Bet? (2008)
- Who Wants to Be a Superhero? (2006–2007)
- Who Wants to Be Governor of California: The Debating Game (2003; one-off GSN special)
- Whodunnit? (2013)
- The Will (2005)
- Work of Art: The Next Great Artist (2010–2011)
- World of Dance (2017–2021)
- The World's Best (2019)
- **The World's Funniest Moments** (**2008–present**)
- The X Factor (2011–2013)
- **Yes, Chef!** (**2025–present**)
- You Write the Songs (1986–1987)
- Your All-American College Show (1968–1970)
- Your Big Break (1999–2001)

== Shows local to a particular state ==
Note: See List of televised academic student quiz programs for a listing of televised local student quiz bowl game shows.

=== California ===
- America's Low Budget Superstar (2006)
- Beat the Genius (1955–1959)
- Beat the Odds (1961–1963)
- The Big Spin (1985–2009)
- By the Numbers (1962–1963)
- Claim to Fame (c. Late 1980s)
- Copycat (1963–1964)
- Jackpot Bingo (1985–1990)
- Lucky Pair (1969–1971)
- Make Me a Millionaire (2009–2010)
- You've Got To Be Kidding (1987–1988)
- Zoom (1962)

=== Florida ===
- Flamingo Fortune (1995–1999)

=== Hawaii ===
- Jan Ken Po! (1990s)

=== Illinois ===
- $100,000 Fortune Hunt (1989–1994)
- Beer Money! (2008, 2014–present, "Gas Money 2012–2013")
- **Game On!** (**2016–present**)
- Illinois Instant Riches (1994–1998)
  - Illinois' Luckiest (1998–2000)
- Let's Face It (1967–1968)

=== Indiana ===
- Hoosier Know It Alls (1997–1998)
- Hoosier Millionaire (1989–2005; also a 2014 "25th-Anniversary" special)

=== Louisiana ===
- N.O. It Alls (1993–1996)
- We Play Baton Rouge (1982–1983)

=== Maryland ===
- High Stakes (circa 1976)
- Kids Baffle (1981–1987)
- Shadow Stumpers (1949–1956)

=== Massachusetts ===
- Bonus Bonanza (1995–1998)
- Candlepin bowling (1958–1996)
- Pocket Money (2009)
- Sox Appeal (2007–2008)

=== Michigan ===
- Fame and Fortune (1989–1991)
  - Megabucks Giveaway (1991–1996)
  - Road To Riches (1996–2000)
- Make Me Rich (2009–2012)

=== Minnesota ===
- 21 Cards (2009)

=== Missouri ===
- D. B.'s Delight (1977–1988)
- Fun & Fortune (1996–2002)

=== Nebraska ===
- The Council of Bluffs (1989; aired on WOWT, the NBC affiliate in Omaha)

=== New York ===
- Beer Money! (2008–TBD)
- Bingo at Home (1958)
- Know Your New York (1947–1948)
- Long Island Challenge (1990s-2000s)
- NY Wired (1997–1999; originally had a "flagship station" of WNBC, which changed to WNYW for the second and final season)
- Public Prosecutor (1951–1952)
- Sense and Nonsense (1951–1954; aired on Mondays, Wednesdays, and Fridays)
- Steampipe Alley (1988–1993)
- Teletruth (1940s)
- You Be the Judge (1946–TBD)

=== North Carolina ===
- Sqrambled Scuares (circa 1999, 2002–2011; called Scrambled Squares until circa 2006)

=== Ohio ===
- Across the Board (1977; pilot aired live for the interactive Warner QUBE)
- **Cash Explosion** (1987–2006, **2007–present**; named Cash Explosion Double Play from 1989 to 2009)
- Flippo's Screen Test (1980; live game show for the interactive Warner QUBE)
- How Do You Like Your Eggs? (1977; four pilots aired live for the interactive Warner QUBE)
- Make Me Famous, Make Me Rich (2006–2007; replaced Cash Explosion, which in turn replaced it a year later)

=== Oklahoma ===
- The Oklahoma Lottery Game Show (2007–2009)

=== Oregon ===
- The Money Game (1988–1990)
  - Oregon Lottery Live (1990)
- On the Spot! (1984–1988)
  - The On the Spot! High School Challenge (1985–1987)

=== Pennsylvania ===
- Philly Pheud (2013–TBD; localized version of Family Feud)
- The Pennsylvania Game (1996–2006)

=== South Carolina ===
- Sqrambled Scuares (2012–2017)

=== Tennessee ===
- Spellround (1960s)

=== Texas ===
- Family Knows Best (2012–2014)
- **Yuck Game Show** (**2005–present**)

=== Virginia ===
- Klassroom Kwiz WDBJ/Channel 7 (1964–1979, 1993–1996)

=== Washington ===
- The Great American Game (1970s)

=== Wisconsin ===
- The Bowling Game (1975–1993; a continuation of Bowling for Dollars)
- Wisconsin Lottery Moneygame (1989–2002)
  - Super Moneygame (2002–2003)

=== Powerball Lottery states ===
- Powerball: The Game Show (2000–2002)
  - Powerball Instant Millionaire (2002–2004)
