= List of programs broadcast by USA Network =

This is a list of television programs formerly or currently broadcast by USA Network.

== Current programming ==
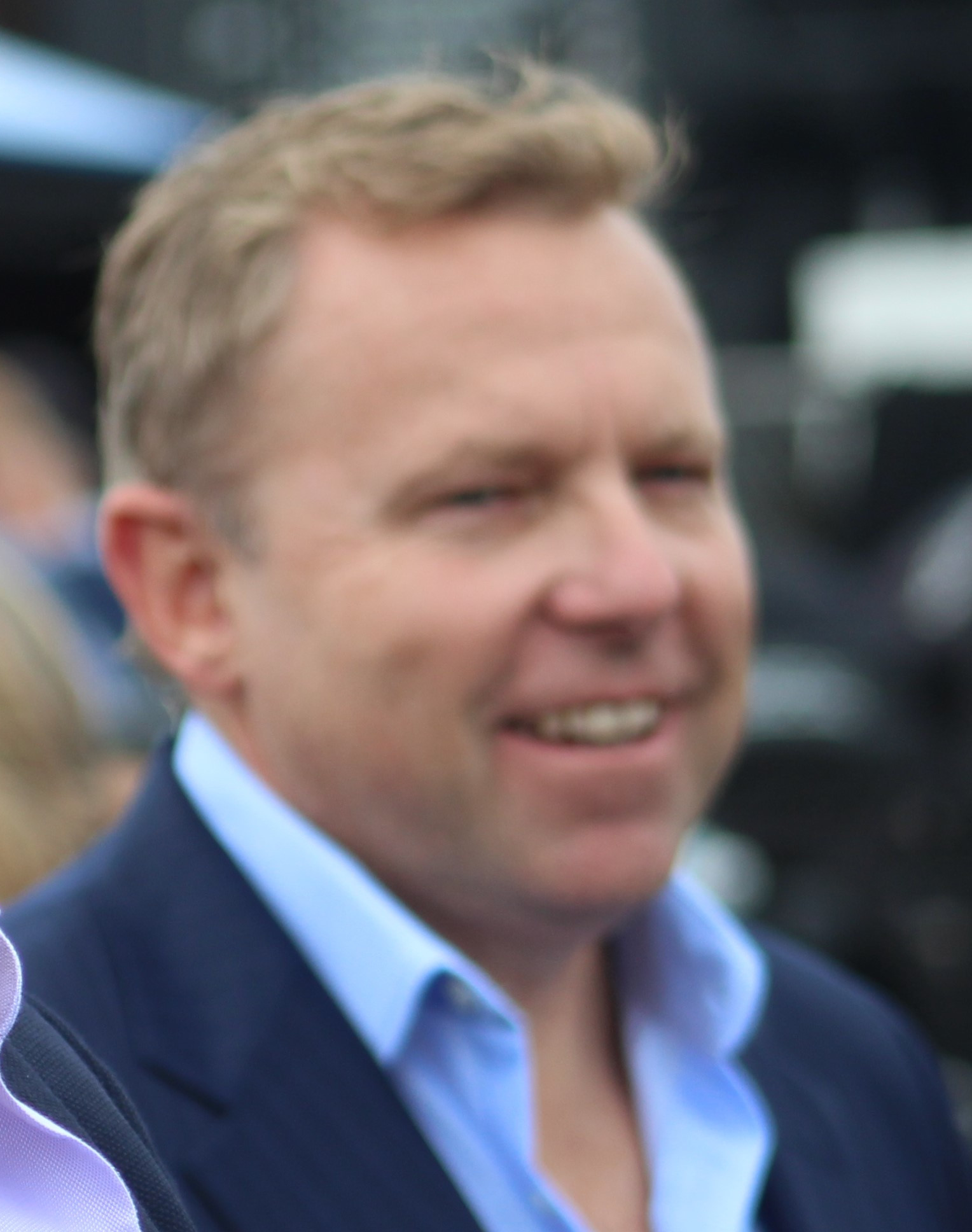
Leigh Diffey – commentator for NASCAR on NBC

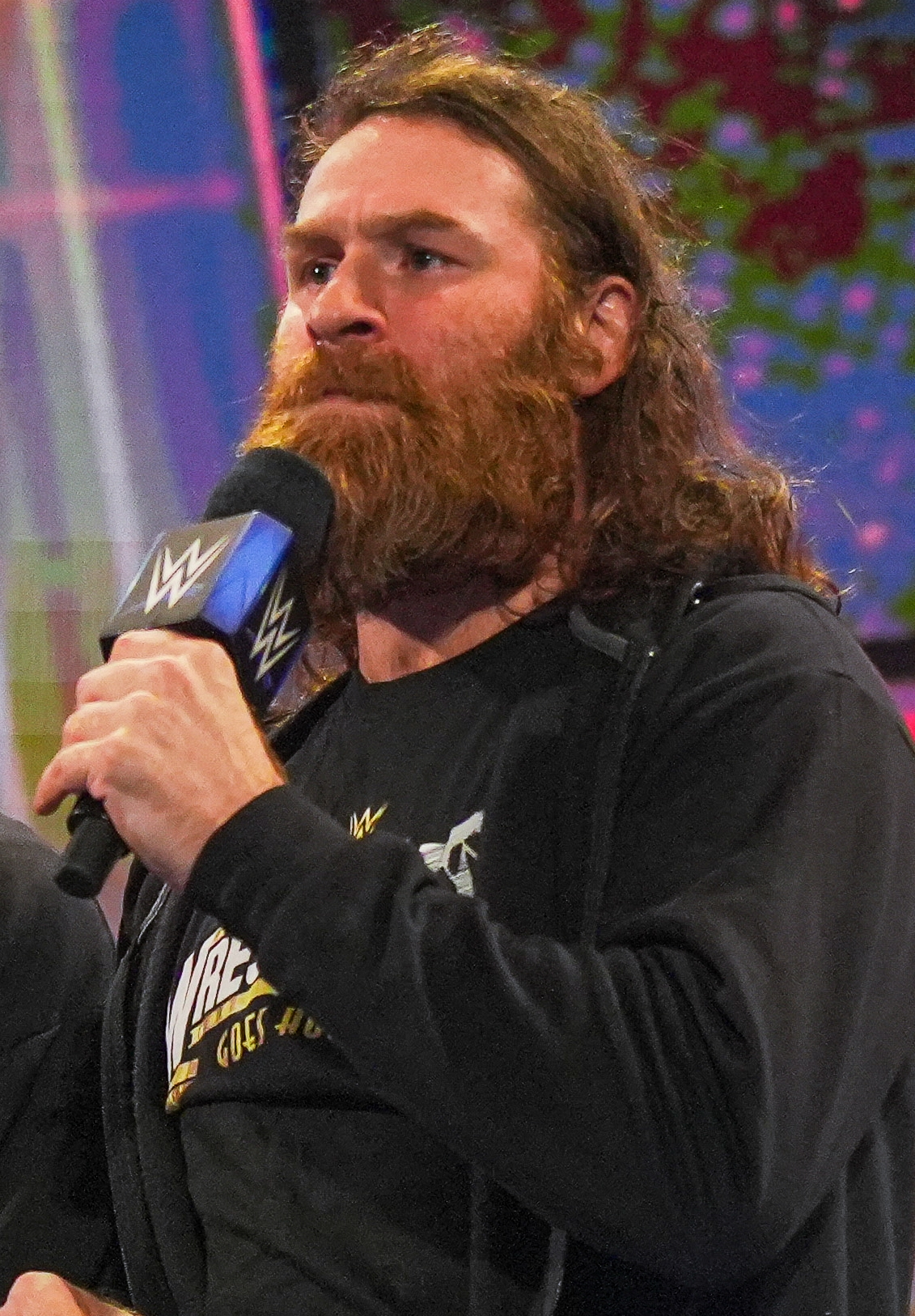
Sami Zayn – WWE wrestler and star of WWE SmackDown

=== Original programming ===
==== Drama ====
Title	Genre	Premiere	Seasons	Length	Status
The Rainmaker	Legal drama	August 15, 2025	2 seasons, 20 episodes	42 min	Season 2 ongoing

==== Unscripted ====
===== Reality =====
Title	Genre	Premiere	Seasons	Length	Status
Everything on the Menu with Braun Strowman	Food reality television	October 24, 2025	2 seasons, 20 episodes	25–26 min	Pending

=== Co-productions ===
Title	Genre	Partner/Country	Premiere	Seasons	Runtime	Status
Anna Pigeon	Crime drama	Crave/Canada	August 7, 2026	1 season, 10 episodes	42 min	Renewed

=== Sports programming ===
- Golf on USA (1982–2007; 2009–2010; 2022)
  - LPGA Tour
  - PGA of America
  - The R&A
  - U.S. Open
  - U.S. Women's Open
- College Basketball on USA (1982–1986; 2022)
  - Atlantic 10 Conference men's and women's basketball
  - Pac-12 Conference men's and women's basketball
- College Football on USA (1980–1986; 2026)
  - Pac-12 Conference men's football
- Olympics on USA (2004)
  - Summer Olympics
  - Winter Olympics
- AMA Supercross Championship (2022)
- AMA Motocross Championship (2022)
- IMSA on USA (2022)
- NASCAR on USA (2022)
- Premier League on USA (2022)
- World Figure Skating Championship (2022)
- Malaysian Cub Prix (2023)
- Nike Hoop Summit (2025)
- FIS Alpine Ski World Cup (2025)
- LOVB Pro (2026)
- WNBA on USA (2026)
- Bundesliga (2026)
- Pro Padel League (2026)
- Tennis on USA (2026)
  - World TeamTennis

==== Pro wrestling ====
- WWE SmackDown (2016–2019; 2024)

=== Syndicated ===
- Law & Order: Special Victims Unit (1999)
- NCIS: Los Angeles (2011)
- Chicago P.D. (2017)
- Dateline (2017)
- Chicago Fire (2022)
- 9-1-1 (2022)
- 911 Crisis Center (2023)
- Shark Tank (2023)
- How I Met Your Mother (2026)
- The Goldbergs (2026)

== Upcoming programming ==
=== Original programming ===
==== Drama ====
Title	Genre	Premiere	Seasons	Length	Status
Diplomatic Immunity	Medical drama	TBA	TBA	TBA	Series order

=== In development ===
==== Drama ====
- Sherlock's Secretary

== Former programming ==
=== Original programming ===
==== Drama ====
- The Ray Bradbury Theater (1987–1992; seasons 3–6)
- Airwolf (1987; season 4)
- The New Alfred Hitchcock Presents (1987–1989; seasons 2–4; moved from NBC)
- The Hitchhiker (1989–1991; seasons 5–6)
- Silk Stalkings (1993–1999; seasons 3–8; moved from CBS)
- TekWar (1994–1996; four TV movies and series)
- Pacific Blue (1996–2000)
- The Big Easy (1996–1997)
- Johnnytime (1997)
- La Femme Nikita (1997–2001)
- The Net (1998–1999)
- Sins of the City (1998)
- Cover Me: Based on the True Life of an FBI Family (2000–2001)
- The Huntress (2000–2001)
- The Dead Zone (2002–2007)
- Monk (2002–2009)
- Peacemakers (2003)
- Touching Evil (2004)
- The 4400 (2004–2007)
- Kojak (2005)
- Psych (2006–2014)
- Burn Notice (2007–2013)
- Law & Order: Criminal Intent (2007–2011; moved from NBC)
- In Plain Sight (2008–2012)
- The Starter Wife (2008)
- Royal Pains (2009–2016)
- White Collar (2009–2014)
- Covert Affairs (2010–2014)
- Fairly Legal (2011–2012)
- Suits (2011–2019)
- Necessary Roughness (2011–2013)
- Common Law (2012)
- Graceland (2013–2015)
- Rush (2014)
- Satisfaction (2014–2015)
- Dig (2015)
- Complications (2015)
- Mr. Robot (2015–2019)
- Colony (2016–2018)
- Motive (2016; seasons 3–4; moved from ABC)
- Queen of the South (2016–2021)
- Falling Water (2016–2018)
- Eyewitness (2016)
- Shooter (2016–2018)
- The Sinner (2017–2021)
- Damnation (2017–2018)
- Unsolved (2018)
- The Purge (2018–2019)
- Pearson (2019)
- Treadstone (2019)
- Dare Me (2019–2020)
- Briarpatch (2020)
- Dirty John (2020)
- Chucky (2021–2024)
- Resident Alien (2025; season 4)

==== Comedy ====
- Check it Out! (1986–1988)
- Sanchez of Bel Air (1986)
- Duckman (1994–1997)
- Weird Science (1994–1998)
- Campus Cops (1996)
- Lost on Earth (1997)
- Claude's Crib (1997)
- G vs E (1999; moved to Sci Fi Channel)
- Manhattan, AZ (2000)
- The War Next Door (2000)
- Sirens (2014–2015)
- Playing House (2014–2017)
- Benched (2014)
- Donny! (2015)

==== Game shows ====
- Smush (2001–2002)

==== Miniseries ====
- Moby Dick (1998)
- Attila (2001)
- Helen of Troy (2003)
- Spartacus (2004)
- Traffic (2004)
- The Starter Wife (2007)
- Political Animals (2012)

==== Unscripted ====
- Black Entertainment Television (1980–1983)
- Alive and Well! (1981–1986)
- You! Magazine (1981–1984)
- Are You Anybody? (1982–1983)
- Co-Ed (1982–1984)
- Hot Spots (1982–1984)
- Scholastic Sports Academy (1982–1984)
- Sonya (1982–1985)
- Woman's Day USA (1982–1983)
- Radio 1990 (1983–1986)
- Cover Story (1984–1989)
- Westminster Kennel Club Dog Show (1984–2003)
- The Dick Cavett Show (1985–1986) (Note: Returned to ABC)
- Jackpot (1985–1988) (Note: Moved to syndication)
- Chain Reaction (1986–1991)
- Love Me, Love Me Not (1986–1987)
- Bumper Stumpers (1987)
- Camp Midnite (1989)
- USA Updates (1989–2000)
- USA Gonzo Games (1991–1992)
- Case Closed (1992–1994)
- Free 4 All (1994–1995)
- Quicksilver (1994–1995)
- CNET Central (1995–1999)
- USA Live (1995–1997)
- The Big Date (1996–1997)
- WWF LiveWire (1996–2000) (Note: Moved to TNN)
- Grill Me (1996) (Note: 1 episode)
- Reel Wild Cinema with Sandra Bernhard (1996–1998)
- Cool Tech (1998–1999)
- The New Edge (1998–1999)
- The Web (1998–1999)
- Strip Poker (1999–2000)
- Farmclub (1999–2000)
- Happy Hour (1999)
- Crush (2000)
- Eco-Challenge: The Expedition Race (2000–2002)
- Friends or Lovers (2000)
- World's Nastiest Neighbors (2000)
- Lover or Loser (2000–2001)
- Cannonball Run 2001 (2001)
- Smush (2001)
- Combat Missions (2002)
- Nashville Star (2003–2007) (Note: Moved to NBC)
- House Wars (2003)
- Made in the USA (2005)
- Dr. Steve-O (2007)
- WWE Tough Enough (2011, 2015; originally aired on MTV from 2001 until 2003, later moved to UPN in 2004)
- The Moment (2013)
- Chrisley Knows Best (2014–2023)
- First Impressions (2016)
- According to Chrisley (2017)
- American Ninja Warrior: Ninja vs. Ninja (2017) (Note: Moved from Esquire Network and was formerly titled Team Ninja Warrior)
- Big Star Little Star (2017)
- The Cromarties (2017)
- Real Country (2018)
- Miz & Mrs. (2018–2022)
- Growing Up Chrisley (2019–2022)
- The Radkes (2019)
- Straight Up Steve Austin (2019–2021)
- Temptation Island (2019–2023) (Note: Moved to Netflix)
- The Biggest Loser (2020)
- Cannonball (2020)
- The Rev (2021)
- She's The Boss (2021)
- America's Big Deal (2021)
- The Courtship (2022)
- Mud, Sweat & Beards (2022)
- Austin Dillon's Life in the Fast Lane (2022)
- Snake in the Grass (2022)
- Race for the Championship (2022)
- Barmageddon (2022–2024)
- The Big D (2023)
- Race to Survive (2023–2024)
- The Anonymous (2024)
- Scare Tactics (2024; season 6) (Note: Seasons 1–5 originally aired on Syfy.)
- NASCAR Americana (2026)

==== Children's programming ====
- Calliope (1978–1993)
- USA Cartoon Express (1982–1996)
- Dance Party USA (1986–1992)
- American Bandstand (1989)
- Tattooed Teenage Alien Fighters from Beverly Hills (1994–1995)
- USA Action Extreme Team (1995–1998)
- USA High (1997–1999)

==== Pro wrestling ====
- WWF on MSG Network (1976–1977)
- Southwest Championship Wrestling (1982–1983)
- WWF All American Wrestling (1983–1994)
- WWF Tuesday Night Titans (1984–1986)
- WWF Prime Time Wrestling (1985–1993)
- WWF Royal Rumble (1988)
- WWF Mania (1993–1996)
- WWE Raw (1993–2000, 2005–2024; moved to Netflix)
- WWF Action Zone (1994–1996)
- WWF Superstars of Wrestling (1996–2000; previously in syndication, moved to TNN)
- WWF Sunday Night Heat (1998–2000; moved to MTV)
- A.M. Raw (2005–2014)
- WWE Tribute to the Troops (2005–2018)
- WWE Hall of Fame Induction Ceremony (2006–2018)
- WWE NXT (2019–2024; moved to The CW)

==== Sports ====
- USA Thursday Game of the Week (1979–1983)
- NBA on USA (1979–1984)
- NHL on USA (1979–1985; 2020)
- MISL on USA (1980–1982)
- College Football on USA (1980–1986; 2020)
- USA Tuesday Night Fights (1982–1998)
- U.S. Open tennis championship (1984–2008)
- World League of American Football (1991–1992)
- PGA Tour on USA (1982–2007; 2010)
- Boost Mobile MLG Pro Circuit (2006)
- IndyCar Series on USA (2022–2024)
- Indy NXT on USA (2022–2024)
- USFL (2022–2023)
- Thoroughbred Racing on NBC (2022–2025)

==== Film presentations ====
- New Wave Theatre (1981–1983)
- Night Flight (1981–1988)
- Kung Fu Theatre (1983–1985)
- USA Saturday Nightmares (1984–1994)
- Commander USA's Groovie Movies (1985–1989)
- USA World Premiere Movie (1989–1996; movies produced, or co-produced by, USA Network)
- USA Up All Night (1989–1998)

=== Syndicated programming ===
- Coronation Street (1982–1983)
- Adventures in Paradise (1983–1984)
- The Alfred Hitchcock Hour (1983–1993)
- Dragnet (1983–1990)
- Bob & Carol & Ted & Alice (1984)
- Bridget Loves Bernie (1984)
- Candid Camera (1984–1988)
- The Flying Nun (1984)
- Gidget (1984)
- The Gong Show (1984–1987)
- Lancer (1984–1986)
- Make Me Laugh (1984–1986)
- Tales of the Unexpected (1984–1985)
- The Virginian (1984–1987)
- Bullseye (1985–1987)
- Chain Reaction (1985–1991)
- The Edge of Night (1985–1989)
- He & She (1985–1987)
- The Joker's Wild (1985–1987, 1991–1994)
- The Master (1985, 1989)
- Peyton Place (1985)
- The Prisoner (1985)
- Room 222 (1985–1988)
- All-Star Blitz (1986)
- Anything for Money (1986–1988)
- The Girl with Something Extra (1986–1988)
- Good Morning World (1986)
- Let's Make a Deal (1986–1988)
- Liar's Club (1986–1987)
- Madame's Place (1986–1991)
- The Monroes (1986)
- Mr. Merlin (1986–1988)
- Oh Madeline (1986–1988)
- Riptide (1986–1988)
- The Second Hundred Years (1986–1987)
- That Girl (1986–1988)
- Wanted: Dead or Alive (1986–1987)
- The Benny Hill Show (1987)
- Code Red (1987–1988)
- The Great Space Coaster (1987)
- Hot Potato (1987–1990)
- The New Mike Hammer (1987–1992)
- Play the Percentages (1987–1989)
- Press Your Luck (1987–1995)
- Search for Tomorrow (1987–1989)
- Temperatures Rising (1987–1988)
- Tic-Tac-Dough (1987–1990, 1993–1994)
- $25,000/$100,000 Pyramid (1988–1995)
- Diamonds (1988–1991)
- Bustin' Loose (1988–1991)
- Double Trouble (1988–1991)
- High Rollers (1988–1991)
- Miami Vice (1988–1991)
- Murder, She Wrote (1988–1997)
- Otherworld (1988)
- Private Eye (1988–1991)
- Street Hawk (1988–1991)
- Tales of the Gold Monkey (1988–1990)
- The Equalizer (1989–1991)
- Face the Music (1989–1990)
- Hollywood Squares (1989–1993)
- It's Your Move (1989–1992)
- Land of the Giants (1989–1992)
- The Law & Harry McGraw (1989–1992)
- Lost in Space (1989–1991)
- My Sister Sam (1989–1993)
- Name That Tune (1989–1991)
- Philip Marlowe, Private Eye (1989–1990)
- The Three Stooges (1989)
- Werewolf (1989–1991)
- Wipeout (1989–1991)
- Counterstrike (1990–1993)
- Divorce Court (1990–1993)
- Dog House (1990–1993)
- Just the Ten of Us (1990–1996)
- MacGyver (1990–1997)
- The Partridge Family (1990)
- Swamp Thing: The Series (1990–1993)
- Win, Lose or Draw (1990–1992)
- Beyond Reality (1991–1993)
- Darkroom (1991)
- The Judge (1991–1993)
- My Two Dads (1991–1995, 2002)
- Scrabble (1991–1995)
- Superior Court (1991–1993)
- Welcome Back, Kotter (1991–1994)
- American Gladiators (1992–1996)
- Bosom Buddies (1992–1995)
- First Business (1992–1996)
- Quantum Leap (1992–1996)
- Sale of the Century (1992–1994)
- The Facts of Life (1993–1998)
- Major Dad (1993–1997, 1999)
- The Odd Couple (1993–1994)
- Parker Lewis Can't Lose (1993–1996)
- Swans Crossing (1993–1994)
- Talk About (1993)
- Wings (1993–2002, 2008–2011)
- Bloomberg Television (1994–2004)
- Caesars Challenge (1994)
- Knight Rider (1994–1996)
- Magnum, P.I. (1994–1999)
- Forever Knight (1995–1996)
- Highlander: The Series (1995–1998)
- Love Connection (1995–1997)
- The People's Court (1995–1997)
- Renegade (1995–2001)
- America's Most Wanted (1996–1997)
- Hercules: The Legendary Journeys (1996–2001)
- Top Cops (1996–1997)
- Walker, Texas Ranger (1996–2011)
- Xena: Warrior Princess (1996–2001)
- Baywatch (1997–2001)
- Gimme a Break! (1997–1998)
- Perfect Strangers (1997–1998)
- Saved by the Bell: The New Class (1997–2001)
- Sirens (1997)
- Webster (1997–1998)
- Boston Common (1998–2000)
- America's Funniest Home Videos (1998–2001)
- The Jeff Foxworthy Show (1998–1999)
- New York Undercover (1998–2001)
- The Single Guy (1998–2000)
- Something So Right (1998–2001)
- Almost Perfect (1999–2002)
- Fired Up (1999–2002)
- JAG (1999–2011)
- The Naked Truth (1999–2000)
- Ned and Stacey (1999–2001)
- Viper (1999–2001)
- Working (1999–2001)
- Carol Burnett and Friends (2000–2001)
- Doctor Doctor (2000–2001)
- Hearts Afire (2000–2001)
- Jesse (2000–2002)
- The John Larroquette Show (2000–2002)
- Martin (2000–2004)
- Nash Bridges (2000–2006)
- Veronica's Closet (2000–2002)
- Living Single (2001–2003)
- Coach (2004–2007)
- The District (2004–2006)
- House M.D. (2006–2018)
- Becker (2008–2011)
- NCIS (2008–2023)
- CSI: Crime Scene Investigation (2011–2020)
- Cheers (2012)
- Modern Family (2013–2021)
- Las Vegas (2020)
- New Amsterdam (2020)
- Sex and the City (2020)
- Zoey's Extraordinary Playlist (2020)
- Law & Order: Organized Crime (2021)
- Ordinary Joe (2021)
- Resident Alien (2021)
- Young Rock (2021)
- Last Man Standing (2021–2023)
- Killing It (2023)
- The Irrational (2023)
- Found (2023)

==== USA Action Extreme Team ====
- Adventures of Sonic the Hedgehog (1995–1997)
- Exosquad (1995–1996)
- Highlander: The Animated Series (1995–1996)
- The Savage Dragon (1995–1998)
- Sonic the Hedgehog (SatAM) (1995–1997)
- Street Fighter (1995–1998)
- Wild C.A.T.s (1995–1996)
- Action Man (1996–1997)
- Double Dragon (1996–1998)
- Mario All Stars (The Super Mario Bros. Super Show! and Super Mario World) (1996–1997)
- Mighty Max (1996–1998)
- Mortal Kombat: Defenders of the Realm (1996–1998)
- Street Sharks (1996–1997)
- Ultraforce (1996–1998)
- Wing Commander Academy (1996–1998)
- Gargoyles (1997–1998)
- Sailor Moon (1997–1998)
