= Outburst (game) =

Party game

- Designers: Brian Hersch
- Publishers: Hersch and Company; Parker Brothers; Hasbro; Mattel
- Publication: 1986; 40 years ago
- Genres: Party games; Trivia games
- Players: 2–99
- Playing time: 60 minutes
- Age range: 18+

Outburst (subtitled The Game of Verbal Explosions!) is a trivia party game designed by Brian Hersch and first published in 1986. Two teams compete over multiple rounds to reach 60 points by guessing items listed on a Topic Card within a time limit.

== Publication history ==
Outburst was originally created in 1986 by Brian Hersch and published by his Los Angeles game company Hersch and Company. In an interview for The Game Inventor's Guidebook, Hersch claimed the idea for the game came to him while listening to a historical radio program on the drive to a dinner party. Outburst was later licensed by Parker Brothers, now a division of Hasbro. From 2004–2015, it was produced by Mattel before being licensed back to Hasbro in 2016.

=== Alternate versions ===
Under its various publishers, the Outburst received different changes to its design and topics. Outburst Junior, a version of the game for children aged 4–10, was released in 1989 and featured colour-coded trivia cards with different levels of difficulty. In 1997, a CD-ROM version was released which added additional variations and the ability to play over the internet. The newest edition, published in 2017, does not use a game board like previous editions in order to make the game less dependant on luck.

== Gameplay ==
The game is played with two teams using Topic Cards with topic headings printed on each side, followed by a list of 10 items that fall under the given topic. The object is to guess the items that were chosen for inclusion on the card, given the topic.

Each round, one of the two teams, with all of its players free to speak at the same time, attempts to guess as many of the 10 listed items as it can before the timer runs out. The team receives as many points as successful guesses, and one item on each card is worth a bonus determined by a roll of dice if guessed. Most editions of the game use game board to keep track of points, with each team moving their Scoring Peg on the point track after each of their turns. The first team to reach 60 points wins.

A special viewer is used that prevents the card from being read (other than the topic heading) until it is placed in the viewer, which allows a team to pass. A team has the option before playing or passing on the first topic offered up to three times during the game. If the team chooses to pass, they must then accept the next topic drawn, while the other team will have to play the passed-on topic on their next turn.

== Reception ==
In a review for Issue 89 of Games, Scott Marley praised Outburst for its clever topics and team-based gameplay. The game was also featured Games's Best Games of 1988, where Marley concluded that "though Outburst is easy to learn, many topics are too hard—and occasionally too spicy—for children."

Outburst had sold 2.5 million copies by 1990.

== See also ==
- Talk About (game show)
