= All Star Secrets =

Television series

- All Star Secrets title logo.
- Created by: Hill-Eubanks Productions
- Presented by: Bob Eubanks
- Announcer: Charlie O'Donnell; Tony McClay
- Country of origin: United States
- No. of episodes: 155

Production
- Production locations: NBC Studios; Burbank, California
- Running time: 30 minutes

Original release
- Network: NBC
- Release: January 8 – August 10, 1979

All Star Secrets is an NBC daytime game show that aired from January 8 to August 10, 1979. A Hill-Eubanks Production, the show was hosted by co-creator Bob Eubanks and announced first by Charlie O'Donnell, but due to conflicts with his announcing duties on Wheel of Fortune, he was later replaced by Tony McClay. For one week of shows during April 1979, the announcer was Bill Baldwin.

== Game play ==
Three contestants were told some interesting secrets about a panel of five stars. The secrets were given to the producers beforehand in an interview, and the contestants' job was to match the secret to the celebrity that gave that secret.

On each secret, a randomizer shuffled money amounts ranging from $120 to $300, stopping when a player pressed a button. After the secret was read, one celebrity whom the secret did not pertain to (just for fun) offered his/her opinion on which star had the secret. The contestants then secretly chose which star had the secret, and a correct answer won money according to how many contestants got it right: if two or all three players were correct, they split the money (1/3 for all three, and 1/2 for two), but if only one player got it, he/she got the whole pot.

Money values doubled for the third and fourth secrets. In the final round, all three players would attempt to identify one final secret, called the "Blind Item", which was worth $1,500. In the final round, no stars were able to guess who they thought was the person who had the secret. The player with the most money at the end of the game was the winner and received a bonus prize, while the other two contestants got to keep whatever money they earned, with a guaranteed $100 minimum, and also received parting gifts. A sudden death secret was played if two or three players were tied.

In the final segment, and during the end credits, Eubanks would sometimes bring in someone that was related to a secret one of the celebrities had or bring in an item mentioned by a celebrity during the game.

== Notable celebrities ==
A number of people who rarely made television game show appearances participated in the show, including Wilt Chamberlain and Arnold Schwarzenegger.

== Pilots ==
The show was originally going to be called Celebrity Secrets, but was changed at the last minute; had its planned 1989 revival made it to air (see below), it would have used said title.

A syndicated revival was planned for the 1989–1990 season (as part of a game show block that included Jackpot!, Talk About, and The Last Word), but was scrapped after the show's distributor ran into financial problems.

== Episode status ==
The episode status is unknown. Eight episodes are known to exist, including the August 1978 pilot episode, as well as a Studio Master, among private collectors. GSN aired the June 5, 1979, episode on Sunday, October 5, 2014, as part of their Time Capsule and aired the same episode on Thursday, October 9, 2014, as part of Throwback Thursday.

== Foreign adaptations ==
A version of All Star Secrets was produced by LWT for the United Kingdom as part of a one-off Bruce Forsyth's Big Night special that aired in April 1980 on ITV. The celebrity panel consisted of Joan Collins, Reginald Bosanquet, Carol Channing, Jimmy Tarbuck, and Susan George.

The series returned to British television as a regular series four years later, in 1985. Hosted by Michael Parkinson, it ran until 1986.
