= Instant Recall =

American television series

- Created by: Adam Tyler; Gary Dawson; Ron Deutsch
- Written by: Gabe Abelson; Morgan Beck; Nicholas Diaz; David Franzke; Tommy James
- Presented by: Wink Martindale
- Starring: Angela Daun
- Theme music composer: Alan Ett
- Country of origin: United States
- No. of seasons: 1
- No. of episodes: 8

Production
- Executive producers: Adam Tyler; Ron Deutsch; Gary Dawson; David Franzke
- Producers: Kelly Lecastre; Brion Inman
- Editors: Jeff Fisher; Maui Tauotaha; Jason Fisher
- Running time: 21–22 minutes
- Production company: Title Card Productions

Original release
- Network: Game Show Network
- Release: March 4 – April 23, 2010

Instant Recall is an American hidden camera game show hosted by Wink Martindale. It premiered on Game Show Network (GSN) on March 4, 2010, with a new episode airing each Thursday for eight weeks, concluding on April 23. The show features contestants who are placed in unusual situations and are filmed with a hidden camera. The contestants are then tested on what they just experienced to see how good their memories are. The more correct answers they provide, the more cash and prizes they win. While one writer was optimistic about the show's performance, another was skeptical, and poor television ratings led to only one season being produced. It was the last game show that Martindale hosted.

== Gameplay ==
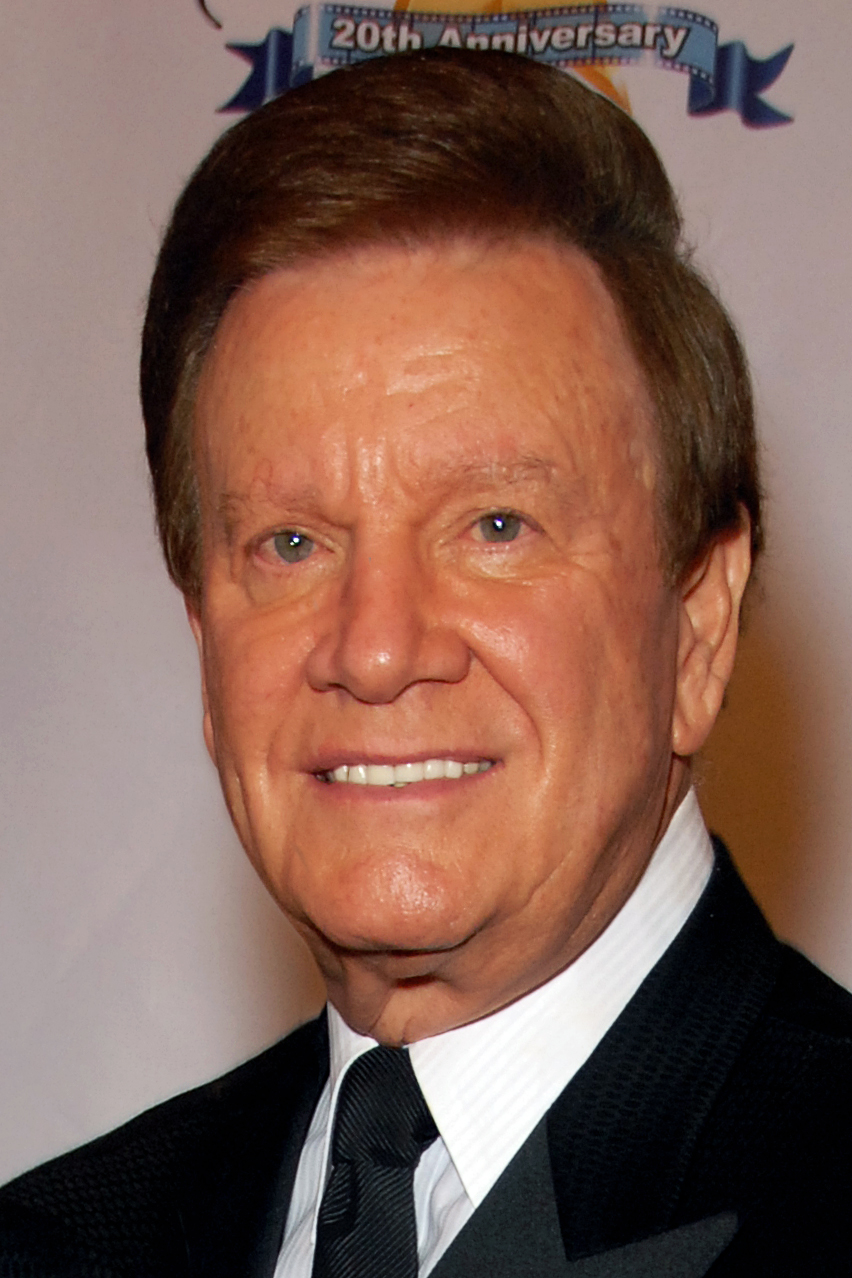
Wink Martindale (pictured in 2010), a co-host of the series

Hosted by Wink Martindale with Angela Daun, both of whom appear in every segment of the show, Instant Recall features several additional main cast members who serve as actors in the first segment of the game. Each episode is filmed in two segments, with the first being shot with hidden cameras. At this point, the contestant does not know he or she is being filmed or even on the show itself. The actors enter the scene to make the contestant a witness in an "outrageous situation."

At the end of the scenario, one of the actors asks the contestant, "Do you like game shows?", after which Martindale enters to inform the contestant that he or she is on a hidden camera game show. The second segment of the game is then played, in which the contestant must answer questions relating to what he or she just witnessed, testing his or her memory. The contestant begins with $500 and can earn up to an additional $3,000 depending on how many questions are answered correctly.

== Production ==
Instant Recall was first announced on February 5, 2010. Adam Tyler, Ron Deutsch, Gary Dawson, and David Franzke (who had previously been involved with the hidden camera show Punk'd) served as executive producers. The series premiered on March 4, 2010, at 8:30 PM ET. The series aired a new episode in that time slot every week, concluding with its eighth and final episode on April 23, 2010.

== Reception ==
Before the series premiered, About.com game show writer Carrie Grosvenor was optimistic about the show's potential success, arguing that it would likely be an improvement over GSN's previous hidden camera show, Hidden Agenda. She also applauded GSN for hiring Martindale to host, saying, "It'll be great to see him back on television." Instant Recall's ratings were below average for GSN, with CNN's James Dinan describing them as "ratings woes". The series' debut episode's ratings were lower than those of its lead-in, Carnie Wilson: Unstapled, though they picked up slightly in April.
