= Slime Time =

- Genre: Game show
- Presented by: Marty Cohen
- Narrated by: Dean Goss
- Country of origin: United States

Production
- Producers: Gary Hunt; Barry Jaffe
- Running time: 30 Minutes
- Production companies: Hunt-Jaffe Productions; OKT, Inc.

Original release
- Network: Syndication
- Release: June 11 – September 3, 1988

Slime Time is a syndicated game show, running on Saturdays from June 11 to September 3, 1988. It was created to cash in on the success of Double Dare, and was very similar to that show. The host was comedian Marty Cohen, who hosted each episode dressed as a referee and the show was announced by Dean Goss.

Slime Time was commonly paired with the kids game show Treasure Mall in syndication. Both shows premiered on June 11 and were cancelled 13 weeks later.

== Gameplay ==
Two teams competed, each consisting of three students and one teacher representing their school. To begin round 1, a tossup stunt was played involving both teams. The winner of the stunt received $25.

After this, one kid from each team faced off to answer a tossup question. Buzzing in with the right answer won $25 and the right to pick the next stunt, but a wrong answer gave the money and the choice of stunt to the other team. Each stunt was represented by a flashing body part on a giant head on center stage, dubbed "Mr. Slimehead." Kids could pick either eye, ear, or nostril, and a card with the stunt's description would pop out of its mouth. Some stunts had prizes hidden behind them; those prizes would be the team's to keep, win or lose.

Round #1: The first round ended after the kids had selected and completed two stunts.

Round #2: In the second round, the money values doubled and new stunts were placed on Mr. Slimehead. Different, nicer prizes were up for grabs as well. Play continued until a buzzer sounded.

Round #3: The final round saw the teachers placed underneath the show's infamous slime faucet, which hovered back and forth ominously over each teacher's head, as all of the kids were asked tossup questions that anyone could buzz in to answer. Getting a question right won $100, but a wrong answer gave the $100 to the other team. The first team to accumulate $1,000 or more won the game. The faucet would then stop hovering right above the losing team's teacher, and dump gallons of thick green slime all over them.

In the first show that was filmed (though not the first to air), the three boys representing Lawrence Junior High School (of Chatsworth, California) and Chamanade easily disposed of the three private school girls by dominating the final round 10-0, thus dumping the dreaded green slime all over their teacher Ms. Lindstrom.

Winners received a large prize package. Both teams kept their money, whilst the runners-up also won a smaller prize package.

== Stunts ==
Stunts used on Slime Time included:

- Meat-A-Balls: Each team member had a large plate of spaghetti, with one meatball inside. When Cohen gave the signal, each one stuck their face in the spaghetti, trying to pick up the meatball with their teeth. The first team to find all their meatballs wins.
- Thread The Needle: The kids had to throw slime-filled balloons to their teacher, who would catch them and place them in a bucket. The catch was that each balloon had to go through a large hoop, the inside rimmed with nails. The hoop was of course positioned right above their teacher's head. The team with the most balloons in 20 seconds won.
- Through The Looking Glass: Each kid was given a handheld mirror and a measuring cup full of slime. They had their backs to their teachers, who were sitting on the floor with a large bowl on their head. The kids had to pour the slime into the bowl without turning their heads or bodies, using the mirror to see where the slime was going. The team with more slime in their bowl after 20 seconds won, and got to dump their slime bowl over the losing teacher's head.
- Other games included; Fortune Cookie, Butterflies are Free, Bobbing for Worms, Peanut Butter Sandwich, Stitch in Time, Leave it to Beaver, Cymbal of my Love, Fly in my Soup, Dumbo Meets Pinocchio, Pie in the Sky, Chicken Little, Save the Spider, Can You Top This?, Snake Pit, Up To Your Elbows, and fan favorite Tanks-A-Lot.

Unless otherwise noted, timed stunts were always 20 seconds long.
