= Your Lucky Clue =

American TV game show (1952)

Your Lucky Clue is an American television game show that was broadcast on CBS from July 13, 1952, until August 31, 1952, at 7:30 p.m. Eastern Time as a summer replacement for This Is Show Business.

== Format ==
Two teams — one composed of two professional detectives and the other composed of two actors who portrayed detectives — competed to solve crimes based on clues contained in a dramatic sketch. The sketch was stopped to allow participants time to record their answers, after which the drama concluded to reveal the solution. Prizes were given to participants who solved the crime successfully.

== Personnel and sponsor ==
Basil Rathbone was master of ceremonies, drawing on his identification with the fictional detective Sherlock Holmes after he had portrayed that character in a series of films. (At least one newspaper picked up on that theme when it ran a picture of Rathbone with the caption, "An old sleuth himself, Basil Rathbone will be host of a new mystery-quiz TVer, Your Lucky Clue ...".)

The premiere episode's professional panel consisted of W. Sherman Burns of the Burns Detective Agency and Patrick King, assistant chief investigator for Saks Fifth Avenue. The amateur team was made up of Walter Greaza, who starred in the TV show Treasury Men in Action, and John Larkin, who had the title role on the radio version of Perry Mason.

The announcer was Andre Baruch. Perry Lafferty was the producer and director, and Henry Kane was the writer. John Gart directed the music. Lucky Strike cigarettes sponsored the program.

== Reception ==
Critic Jack Gould, in a review of the first episode in The New York Times, noted that the failure of both teams to find a correct solution "didn't make for a notably exciting half hour". He added that Rathbone "sounded both hurried and harassed, which made him all even with the audience at home".

Newspaper columnist Walter Winchell also criticized Rathbone's work on the show, writing that the actor was "as jittery as a bridegroom while presiding over the panel".

A review in the trade publication Billboard commended the acting of the cast that presented the sketch. It said that Rathbone "makes a good moderator", but "he appeared to be rushing thru [sic] his script to the extent that it was at times difficult to keep up with him."
