= Treasure Mall =

- Genre: Game show
- Created by: Ellen Levy
- Directed by: Rob Fiedler
- Presented by: Hal Sparks
- Narrated by: Ed MacKay
- Theme music composer: Andrew Dimitroff
- Country of origin: United States
- No. of episodes: 13

Production
- Executive producers: Haim Saban; Robert Unkel; Peter R. Berlin; Rob Fiedler
- Producer: Peter R. Berlin
- Production locations: Chris Craft TV; Los Angeles, CA
- Running time: 30 minutes
- Production companies: Saban Productions, Inc. Feidler-Berlin Productions, Inc. OKT Inc.

Original release
- Network: Syndicated (weekly)
- Release: June 11 – September 3, 1988

Treasure Mall is a kids game show which aired in weekly syndication from June 11 to September 3, 1988. Hal Sparks was the host, with Ed MacKay announcing.

It was commonly paired with the kids game show Slime Time, also in syndication. The two shows debuted and were cancelled on the same dates. Treasure Mall was considered to be the first ever children's shopping game show.

== Gameplay ==
Two teams, each consisting of one boy and one girl, competed. In round 1, teams heard survey questions with three possible answers. (For example: "We asked sixth graders what they would do if they saw a bug on their friend's shoulder. Would they brush it off, tell their friend, or wait and see what happens?") Each teammate locked in what they believed was the most popular answer. A right answer won a point for their team (if both teammates agreed and were correct, they score two points). The first team to reach 5 points or more won the right to enter a store in the Treasure Mall. If there was a tie on 5 or more, the round continued until one team had the lead outright.

Every store in the mall had a theme; Toy Store, Fashion Boutique, etc. The stores were divided into four distinct sections, with 4 coins hidden in each section; each teammate searched two areas, taking alternating turns to do so. One teammate had 25 seconds to search the first section for coins, dropping them into a bucket Sparks was holding. The coins had to go into the bucket for them to count. When time ran out (indicated by a bell), the clock reset to 25 and the other teammate began the next section immediately. After the final buzzer, the coins were counted up. The team won a prize package depending on how well they did; the more coins they collected, the better the package. Two valuable prizes were won if a team managed to find all 16 coins.

Round 2 was played exactly the same way, except that the team won the right to enter a different store. The team who had more coins at the end of this round (or the team who won both rounds) won the game and advanced to the bonus round. If both teams have the same amount of coins, another survey question is played.

=== Bonus Round ===
In the bonus round, a series of gift boxes sat center stage in front of a large golden treasure chest. Inside the gift boxes were keys, and the team had 30 seconds to go through the boxes and collect as many keys as they could. The keys had to go into the bucket Sparks was holding in order to count.

After time ran out, Sparks tried each key out in the treasure chest. If one of the keys opened the chest, the team won a large prize package. Upon the chest being open, balloons would come out and confetti would be shot. If none of them did, the team still won a $50 gift certificate for each key they found.

=== Cancellation ===
On September 3, 1988, Treasure Mall was cancelled after four months on the air.
