= Hidden Agenda (game show) =

American hidden camera game show

- Presented by: Debi Gutierrez
- Theme music composer: Philippe Boveste; Ronny Marley
- Country of origin: United States
- Original language: English
- No. of seasons: 1
- No. of episodes: 7

Production
- Executive producers: Michael Davies; Avi Nir; Elad Kuperman; Ran Telem
- Running time: 21–22 minutes
- Production companies: Embassy Row; Keshet Broadcasting; Kuperman Productions; Sony Pictures Television

Original release
- Network: Game Show Network
- Release: January 14 – February 25, 2010

Hidden Agenda is an American hidden camera game show hosted by comedian Debi Gutierrez. The series premiered on Game Show Network (GSN) on January 14, 2010, airing new episodes once a week for seven weeks. The show uses with hidden cameras to record couples playing as contestants. One member of the couple knows they are on the show and must convince their partner to complete a series of challenges. The series was canceled after its first season primarily due to poor ratings.

== Gameplay ==
The series is shot with hidden cameras and features couples playing together as contestants. Only one member of the couple knows they are being filmed, and must convince their partner to complete a variety of "outrageous and comedic challenges." The couple wins a monetary prize dependent on how many challenges they complete.

== Production ==
Hidden Agenda was first announced on December 10, 2009. Television comedian Debi Gutierrez was chosen to host the show, other actors were also employed to add "fun and excitement" to the challenges. Michael Davies' production company Embassy Row served as the series' producers. The show premiered on January 14, 2010. After seven episodes, the series was dropped from GSN's schedule and eventually canceled.

== Reception ==
An editor for Hollywood Junket drew comparisons between the series and Ashton Kutcher's hidden camera show Game Show in My Head, which debuted on CBS a year earlier. The series' ratings were below average for GSN (CNN's James Dinan described them as "ratings woes"), falling over time, and by April, the show was absent from GSN's schedule entirely.

== See also ==
- Game Show in My Head
- Instant Recall
