= PlayCafe =

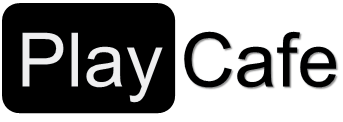
- Genre: Interactive game show
- Created by: Mark Goldenson; Dev Nag
- Presented by: Daniella Martin (Aug. 2007 - Aug. 2008); Chad Mosher (Aug. 2008 - Dec. 2008)
- Theme music composer: Positively Dark _{(Aug. 2007 - Aug. 2008)} Collin Seaman (Aug. 2008 - Dec. 2008)
- Opening theme: "Burn" (Aug. 2007 - Aug. 2008) "My Name is Chad" (Aug. 2008 - Dec. 2008)
- Country of origin: United States
- Original language: English
- No. of episodes: 326

Production
- Producers: Collin Seaman (Oct. 2007 - Aug. 2008)
- Running time: 60 minutes

Original release
- Release: April 2007 – December 18, 2008

Related
- LiveFire (May—Oct. 2007)

PlayCafe (formerly LiveFire) was an interactive Internet game show network which billed itself as "the first online game show network." PlayCafe was founded in April 2007 by Dev Nag and Mark Goldenson, funded by angel investors. PlayCafe produced over 300 hour-long episodes, which were broadcast live from Redwood City, California and hosted by Daniella Martin from August 2007 to August 7, 2008, then by Chad Mosher in Flint, Michigan from August 14, 2008 to December 18, 2008.

PlayCafe broadcast two shows daily, Monday through Friday, at 6:00 pm and 7:00 pm Pacific Time (UTC -7) until May 30, 2008. On the last daily show, it was announced that the broadcast schedule would change to one show a week, starting the following week. On June 5, 2008, PlayCafe broadcast its first weekly shows on Thursday at the same time as the daily shows until its final show on December 18, 2008.

== History ==
Under the name "LiveFire," the show premiered in May 2007, which featured twenty players invited by the co-founders. Production of one show a day, Monday through Friday, commenced on October 29, 2007 and expanded to two shows a day on December 31, 2007. The name changed to PlayCafe in late October 2007. However, on May 30 of 2008, the show's format shifted from daily shows (Monday-Friday) to once a week shows on Thursday. On October 30, it was announced that remaining investor money had been returned, no prizes would be given after the previous week's shows (and as such, the raffle tickets earned in the previous week's shows were null and void), and live PlayCafe broadcasts would be ending. The final broadcast was held on December 18, 2008, culminating with a three-hour special.

Live shows were no longer produced after December 18, 2008. Users could host their own shows using the site's interface, some of which differed from those that PlayCafe ran. On January 30, 2009, the game user interface was replaced with a redirect to the PlayCafe blog, which stated:

"...[W]e have decided to hold off on producing shows for now. We are thrilled with the enthusiasm of so many of you.... Unfortunately in these challenging times, it has been difficult to continue our growth. We are exploring partnerships with companies that can use PlayCafe's technology and give our shows wider distribution.... Thank you all for your enthusiasm and support and we hope to see you again soon!"

== Interface ==
Every user that watches PlayCafe during a live show is a contestant on the show: players enter answers via an Adobe Flash interface, which displays the question, answer choices, statistics of the user, and a leaderboard after each question. PlayCafe is currently streamed through Stickam.

== Format ==
Each hour-long episode consists of three segments with a choice of six different formats: Media Mash-up, Predict the Poll, Mix and Match, Either-Or, Missing Links, and Letter Perfect. Players may also participate in Live Call-ins, which take place during the fourth question of each segment. Before the last question of the third segment, a Bonus Round is played.

=== Media Mash-up ===
In Media Mash-up, a video, image, or audio clip is shown, and players answer three questions about the media played. Each question has four answer choices unique to each question. Players are awarded points for each correct answer, the value of which is determined by how fast the player answers each question. The point counter starts at 3,500 points at the start, but continuously decreases to 0 at a rate of 100 points per second. Players may change their answers after answering each question, but each time a player changes their answer, the points possible for that question is changed to reflect the lower number of points on the timer.

=== Either-Or ===
In Either-Or, players match four items in a list to one of two choices. Some examples of these choices, which were used so far, include "Play (Shakespeare character) or Plague (disease)" and "Dead or Canadian". Scoring and game play are identical to Media Mash-up.

=== Mix and Match ===
A "Mix and Match" round in progress.

In Mix and Match, players match four different parts of question to one of five answer choices, common to each part of the question. Scoring and game play are identical to Media Mash-up.

A previous version of this round featured seven answer choices.

=== Predict the Poll ===
A "Predict the Poll" game in progress.

In Predict the Poll, players have ten seconds to answer one question. Players either type their answer or drag-and-drop a blue triangle to represent their answer to the question. Points are awarded depending on how close guesses come to the actual answer.

There are two types of questions in the Predict the Poll round. The original (and more common) format of questions featured in the Predict the Poll round ask players to try and accurately predict the findings of opinion polls, which are either national polls from polling organizations, such as The Gallup Organization, or in-house polls conducted online. An exact guess awards players 10,000 points. Players may guess within a thirty-percent range above or below the correct answer to receive points. Points gradually decrease over the thirty-percent range, as shown in the table below:

Percent Incorrect	0	1	2	3	4	5	6	10	15	16	17	20	25	29	30+
Points Awarded	10,000	9,666	9,333	9,000	8,666	8,333	8,000	6,666	5,000	4,666	4,333	3,333	1,666	333	0

The second format of the Predict the Poll round is also known as Name That Number, which asks players to accurately predict a numerical quantity, such as a population of a country or calories in a food. Like the traditional format of Predict the Poll, this format awards 10,000 points for a correct guess. Players must guess within thirty percent of the entire range above or below the correct answer. For example, in a range between zero and 200 calories, the margin allowed would be 60 calories above and below the correct answer.

=== Missing Links ===
In Missing Links, players link words together to form a chain, each word being part of a two-word term, connected by common words. Four of those words are to be picked by the players, with other words already given. Occasionally, there is no given word between the two answers, meaning the two answers themselves link together, potentially raising the difficulty. Scoring and game play are identical to Media Mash-up.

=== Letter Perfect ===
In Letter Perfect, players are given a clue to a 6-, 7-, or 8-letter mystery word, then must fill in the missing letters to complete the word. Essentially, for each correct letter a player selects within the time limit, they are awarded points. Scoring and game play are identical to Media Mash-up.

This game was debuted on PlayCafe on May 15, 2008, and is the first user-created game to be featured on the show.

=== Live Call-ins ===
Before the fourth question of each segment, a phone number is displayed and players are encouraged to participate in a Live Call-in and interact directly with the studio crew during question five. Only one player may participate in a Live Call-in each segment. No additional game points are won for calling in, but if the call-in player earns more than 5,000 points during the question, he or she wins a $5 Amazon.com gift certificate.

Originally, players were awarded five raffle tickets, as call-ins were done more frequently. Call-ins are no longer done.

=== Bonus Round ===
Before the final question of each show, the Bonus Round is played. For each 10,000 points players earn in a segment, they earn a key. Unlike points earned in each segment, keys are kept until the end of each show, when they are redeemed in the bonus round. Players choose a number of treasure chest icons from a field of 30 equal to the number of keys they have, with a limit of 6 keys. After 45 seconds, icons that were "inside" the chests are revealed. If a player matches a certain number of identical icons, they win the prize indicated by the icon. Some prizes available in the bonus round include raffle tickets to the next week's drawing, Reactee T-shirts, Amazon gift cards, Audible audiobooks, ITunes songs, Wiis, and US$1,000. A player needed to find all six "cash" icons to win the $1,000, the odds of which were 1 in 593,775. The final bonus round was October 23, 2008. The $1,000 was never awarded, although two players did win Wiis.

=== Weekly Raffle ===
The Weekly Raffle segment occurred during the second hour of every show. Originally, raffles were done during the Monday show based on the tickets awarded the previous week. As PlayCafe no longer broadcasts daily from Monday through Friday, raffles for one Thursday show were done in the following Thursday show.

As players answer questions in a segment, they accumulate points based on the objective of the round. If players have one of the ten highest point totals at the end of the segment, they earn between one and ten "Raffle Tickets:" ten tickets to the first-place finisher, nine to the second-place finisher, all the way down to one ticket for the tenth-place finisher. Should an equal score between two or more players result at the end of a segment, each tied player is given the same number of tickets. In the following show, three tickets are randomly selected from the tickets of the previous week, winning prizes such as Amazon.com or iTunes Store gift certificates.

A team raffle and an invite raffle were done in addition to the individual raffle. Teams, as a whole, were awarded tickets based on their point totals, and in the following show, one ticket would be drawn, awarding $5 Amazon.com gift certificates to every member on the team, up to 50. The invite raffle was based on the number of invites a user sent during the week, through social networking websites such as MySpace and Facebook. The winner of the invite raffle won a $10 Amazon.com gift certificate.

As of the July 24, 2008 show, the team and invite raffles were discontinued in favor of larger individual prizes. The second October 23, 2008 show was the last program to have an individual raffle, although a condensed raffle did appear on the December 4 and 11, 2008 programs.
