= You Write the Songs =

American television music competition

- Created by: Al Masini
- Developed by: Bob Banner
- Presented by: Ben Vereen
- Starring: Monica Page, Cat Adams, Kenny James
- Country of origin: United States
- No. of seasons: 1
- No. of episodes: 26

Production
- Running time: 30 minutes
- Production companies: Bob Banner Associates; Television Program Enterprises

Original release
- Network: Syndicated
- Release: 1986 – 1987

You Write the Songs is an American music competition television series. It aired in syndication from 1986 to 1987 for a total of 26 episodes. The show featured amateur songwriters competing to have one of their songs recorded. Ben Vereen hosted the show, with a panel of rotating judges and a house band that included Monica Page, Cat Adams, and Kenny James.

== Format ==
You Write the Songs features songwriters competing to have their works judged by a panel of judges. All songs in the competition are required to be original works that had not appeared within the top 50 of any music industry record chart. Every show features three different songwriters, whose songs are performed by the show's in-house band. The judging panel ranks the song's quality on a scale of one to ten, with the highest-scoring songwriter earning a $1,000 cash prize and the right to compete against two new songs on the next episode. At the end of twelve weeks, the top-scoring songs compete in a final competition with a grand prize of $100,000. The winning song was "Everybody Needs a Dream" which was written by Tom Grose.

== Production ==
Ben Vereen was the show's host. The show's house band included vocalists Monica Page, Cat Adams, and Kenny James. Each episode also featured a guest appearance from a singer, including Smokey Robinson, Whitney Houston, Melissa Manchester, and Neil Sedaka. The show was taped at the Aquarius Theatre (last known as the Earl Carroll Theatre) in Hollywood.

== Critical reception ==
David Hinkley of the New York Daily News was mixed toward the show. He considered Vereen's hosting style uninspired and the show's format derivative of Star Search and other music competitions, although he also thought that the show's focus on songwriters over performers had the potential to make it stand out.
