= Sqrambled Scuares =

American game show

- Directed by: Buzz Berry
- Presented by: Buzz Berry; Katie Haas (2012-January 2015); Delilah Christie (October–December 2013); Lisa Jean (February–March 2017)
- Country of origin: United States
- No. of seasons: 4
- No. of episodes: 160

Production
- Producer: BZB Productions
- Running time: 30 Minutes

Original release
- Network: HTC Digital Cable, Channel 4 (South Carolina only)
- Release: December 16, 2012 – March 14, 2017

Sqrambled Scuares (sic; originally known as Scrambled Squares) is a game show airing on HTC Digital Cable in South Carolina. It had been hosted by local personality Buzz Berry since its inception, and produced by Berry's production company BZB Productions. The show taped from Barefoot Landing in Myrtle Beach on Thursdays at 7:00 PM.

Originally, Berry handled nearly all of the hosting duties himself. Delilah Christie became co-host on Episode #MB38 (October 7, 2013), with her duties consisting of some opening banter with Berry, introducing the players, and announcing each round's category, number of words, number of letters, and number of Missers. Christie was not present onstage during the rest of the show, and last appeared on December 16 (#MB47).

Episodes can be viewed on the show's website, as well as the show's official YouTube page.

An official Blip page contained the current Myrtle Beach shows, along with most of the former Boone and Hickory versions, which remained until the site was shut down in August 2015.

Posts from the Sqrambled Scuares Facebook page since late May 2020 indicate the show is returning in a "virtual television game show" format.

== Gameplay ==
Two contestants compete; each is spotted 100 points to start the game.

Players take turns picking squares from a game board of 16. If the player reveals a letter, it is placed on the descrambler board in its proper word, but in the order it was found, and the player is awarded points and a chance to unscramble the squares; consonants are worth 10 points, while vowels are worth 20.

Once both players have found a letter during a round, they may ask for revealed letters to be placed in their proper positions for a cost of 10 or 20 points (consonants and vowels, respectively). All letters placed in this way are covered with a transparent yellow card, whether by spending points or finding a "Placer" (below).

=== Special Squares ===
As the game is played, players may find various special items that will help or hinder them as the game progresses:

- Bonus Points: In addition to the points for the letter, the player is awarded the points noted on the card; generally, this is either "Bonus 10" or "Bonus 20".
- Doubler: The point value of the letter is doubled to 20 for a consonant or 40 for a vowel.
- Double Doubler: The point value of the letter is quadrupled to 40 for a consonant or 80 for a vowel.
- Placer: The letter is placed in its proper position on the board, with other letters being moved as necessary. The player does not lose points for this.
- Twofer: The player may take an extra turn.
- Prize: The player is credited with a prize, typically a $20–$25 gift certificate to a local business. The player only keeps his or her prizes by unscrambling the squares for that round. Occasionally, a prize is coupled with additional points or a Placer.
- Misser: The player loses their turn without a chance to unscramble the squares, and no letters are placed. Prior to the start of the round, the host will announce the number of Missers on the board (always the difference between 16 and the number of letters in the solution); typically, there will be no more than three Missers.

=== Solving ===
After finding a letter, or placing one, a player has five seconds to state "I'd like to unscramble the squares". The host will then give the player a chance to give the solution; if the solution given is correct, that player picks up an additional 100 points, while his or her opponent loses 100 points. Scores can never go below zero.

Players can also ask to unscramble the squares before picking or placing a letter; this is generally not done if there are no more Missers on the board, although it has happened on occasion.

If nobody has unscrambled the squares after all of the letters have been found or five minutes have elapsed (whichever comes first), the players alternate turns placing letters only until one of them unscrambles the squares. Players still lose points for each letter placed.

On at least one episode, the winner of each round also had the first chance at a bonus question called the "Sqrambled Scuestion". The question had four multiple-choice options, read in a random order. If the player gave the correct answer, they won a $25 Wal-Mart gift card and a 50-point bonus. An incorrect answer gave the opponent a chance at the points and gift card.

=== Winning ===
The game is played in two rounds, each with one puzzle. The player with the most points at the end of the game wins $50 and first chance to play the "Super Sqramble"; in the event of a tie (the most recent being Episode #392 on October 26, 2009), both players win the game and $50, and play Super Sqramble together.

== Super Sqramble ==
The day's winner has 60 seconds to unscramble a 9 or 10-letter word, two letters of which are on a yellow background. Once 15 seconds have elapsed, the host tells the player the location of one of the yellow letters, and once 30 seconds have elapsed, the host tells the player the location of the other yellow letter. Players may move letters around as they wish during the round.

At any point during the round the player may press a button to stop the clock and indicate that they know the word. If they are correct, they win an additional $100 "Super Stash of Cash" ($500 on every 100th show). If not, the time resumes and they may continue moving letters and guess again.

Should the first contestant fail, their opponent (who watches the proceedings from a "second try" chair) is given a third letter to move into its proper position and ten seconds to unscramble the word for $50.

In the event of a main-game tie, the contestants work together in the Super Sqramble and split $200 if they win.

=== Changes ===
Originally, only the day's winner could try Super Sqramble. When the "second try" rule was first implemented, the runner-up had only five seconds to unscramble the word.

== Home Scramble ==
During the commercial breaks, short three-second clips appear with different letters on-screen. During the show, the host gives the location of one of the letters. The letters unscramble to form a word pertaining to a particular category, and viewers who call or e-mail the show with the correct word are entered into a drawing for prizes.

Typically there are three winners each week, and each wins a gift certificate to the local Golden Corral.

== Set ==
The show's set is very basic, with sixteen four-sided boxes in the center of the stage; each box consists of the number, a "bonus card" side (if applicable), the hidden letter (if applicable), and a blank side. On each side of the border are six "blank" colored boxes.

The score displays use an orange seven-segment readout on a black background; the episode's sponsor (currently Auntie Anne's) has a card located between the contestants.

The puzzle board has two lines of holders for the letters, with two TV monitors showing the category; the entire board flips around for the Super Sqramble, with the monitors changing to a 60-second clock.

=== Changes ===
The original score displays used a rotating designation for "One Hundred", "Two Hundred", etc. written in script over a two-digit number with the contestant nameplates underneath; the current score displays (and nametag placements) debuted on March 31, 2003 (Episode #26).

For at least the first 100 episodes, the show used twenty-five boxes at center-stage; this presumably allowed for longer puzzles, more Missers, or both. In addition, the puzzle board had no category displays.

The plaque showing the main sponsor's logo (the sponsor that provided the bonus money) was added between the contestants' scores on June 7, 2004 (Episode #84). Two weeks later (June 21), an oversized $100 bill was placed underneath the show's sponsor plaque between the contestants. This was changed to a single picture with a wad of money on October 6, 2008.

The lights to denote the current contestant's turn debuted on July 3, 2006, as did a more colorful backdrop behind the contestants. The lights bordering the contestant podium (also to denote turns and winners) first appeared on July 31, 2006, and remained through 2011.

The contestant nameplates were given a much larger font beginning on June 9, 2008 (#284), which was also used for the last seven Hickory episodes. The current style, which debuted when the show moved to Myrtle Beach, has colored squares behind each name, which themselves are composed of individual letters.

The first sponsor shown on the contestant podium was High Country Bank from June 7, 2004, to May 2, 2005; from May 9 to June 20, the Scrambled Squares logo was seen instead of a sponsor, suggesting that BZB was paying the winnings out-of-pocket. On June 27, 2005, Piedmont Federal began sponsoring the "Super Stash of Cash", with United Community Bank sponsoring the "Big Bundle of Bucks" beginning on January 19, 2009 (#337) and alternating with Piedmont; occasionally, a second sponsor's plaque would be adjacent to that of the primary sponsor. United Community became the sole sponsor beginning on December 7, 2009 (#400), when the show returned to airing one new episode per week; the "Super Stash" plaque was also retired.

When the show returned to airing two new episodes per week on May 30, 2011, United Community sponsored both episodes; the following week (June 6), TCBY began sponsoring the Big Bundle of Bucks on each episode. While no official reason was given for the abrupt change, United Community's last two episodes had very fast Bonus Sqramble solves (two seconds on #438, five seconds on #439).

A computerized game board debuted on Myrtle Beach episode #120. Concurrent with this new board, Missers now have X's in the background, and Placers are now green letters on a white background. In addition, the winning contestant stands at a lectern equipped with a mouse for Super Sqramble and uses the mouse to drag and drop the letters on two large screens.

== Production notes ==
- The series was originally called Scrambled Squares. At some point between Episode #136 (June 20, 2005) and Episode #200 (January 22, 2007), the logo was redesigned to switch the "C" and "Q", becoming Sqrambled Scuares; the switched letters are, in their new positions, somewhat dislodged.
- The first Boone episode (September 2, 2002) had Jamie Vines playing against Andrew Puckett; Puckett won, 290–230.
- Host Buzz Berry has only missed one show – the February 20, 2006 episode (#168); Christopher Wilkinson filled in for him. Berry thanked Wilkinson, among many others, during the 400th episode in 2009.
- The first contestant to be brought back was Brandon Lewter; on his first appearance (June 27, 2005), he lost to Cindy Lilly by 70-440. He was brought back three weeks later on July 11 and won the game.
- The highest winning score was 960 by John Patterson on March 3, 2003. His opponent, Jenny Koehn, scored 580.
- The first tie game occurred on October 7, 2002: John Ballard and Olivia Church finished with 310 points.
- The Bonus Sqramble record is two seconds, set by Mike Wood on May 30, 2011 (#438).
- From the show's debut in 2002 through January 7, 2008, and again from December 7, 2009, through December 6, 2010, new episodes were taped on Thursday nights at 7:00 PM then aired once per week.
- There are no returning champions; aside from special circumstances, two new contestants compete on each show. Further, and aside from special circumstances, contestants are chosen through free applications available on the show's website.

=== Former versions ===
Sqrambled Scuares
- Also known as: Sqrambled Scuares (Boone)
- Directed by: Julie Houck
- Presented by: Buzz Berry
- Country of origin: United States
- No. of episodes: 459

Production
- Producer: BZB Productions
- Running time: 30 Minutes

Original release
- Network: Charter Cable (North Carolina only)
- Release: September 2, 2002 – September 19, 2011

Sqrambled Scuares
- Also known as: Sqrambled Scuares (Hickory)
- Directed by: Julie Houck
- Presented by: Buzz Berry
- Country of origin: United States
- No. of episodes: 18

Production
- Producer: BZB Productions
- Running time: 30 Minutes

Original release
- Network: Charter Cable (North Carolina only)
- Release: March 17 – July 28, 2008

Scrambled Squares began on November 5, 1999, as a brief series airing in the Greensboro market. The Boone version (which, in addition to Charter Cable, aired on WLNN-LP) aired from 2002 to 2011 with a version for the Hickory market running for a brief time in 2008.

From January 14, 2008, to November 16, 2009, and from May 27, 2011, through the end of the Boone era, the show taped on Tuesdays at 6:00 and 7:00 PM. For the latter period, the second taping was Sqrambled Scuares Squared (two teams of two), which only lasted 11 episodes.

Beginning with the 200th Boone episode on January 22, 2007, each new episode of Sqrambled Scuares was available for viewing on the show's website. Although thumbnails and pages were viewable, the first 199 Boone episodes (through January 15, 2007) – plus Episode #209 – were not available for unknown reasons.

The show's Blip page contains all Boone episodes from #264 (March 22, 2008) onward and all Hickory episodes except the first.

=== Anniversary episodes ===
The show's 100th episode aired on October 4, 2004; its 200th episode aired on January 22, 2007; and its 300th episode aired on August 11, 2008. In all three instances, the top prize was increased from $100 to $500.

On the 400th episode (December 7, 2009), after randomly selecting contestants from the audience, each contestant was paired with a randomly assigned second person known as a "box buddy"; the box buddy did not play, but received $50 if their contestant partner won the game and an additional $100 if their partner won the Super Sqramble (which was worth the usual $100). In addition, at the end of the show, one additional number was drawn; the holder of that number won $50. The contestants automatically won $50 each just for playing; only one round was played on this episode, and unlike other episodes, both contestants kept their prizes.

The difference in the time between the 200th and 300th episodes (18 months) as opposed to the 100th and 200th (28 months) is due to the adoption of the twice-weekly format; this began with Episode #246 on January 14, 2008.

=== Special episodes ===
Sqrambled Scuares has done many special shows, including couples playing against each other (first happening on March 8, 2004); however, a second "couples" episode would not be held until January 30, 2006.

A "Western Youth Network" edition was broadcast on February 27, 2006, and again on February 11, 2008; a similar "Father & Son Edition" was aired on March 13, 2006.

Similar "themed" shows have also been done, beginning with Episode #37 on June 16, 2003 – a "Horn In The Wests" battle between Darrell King and Jenny Cole-Reed; it was also one of the lowest-scoring episodes in the series' history, with the final scores being 270 to 180.

Several episodes have been done for charity, including a "Watauga County Crimestoppers" edition (April 2, 2007) in which two games were played with two sets of contestants, the winners playing the Super Sqramble together. Another was an "American Red Cross: Watauga County Chapter" match on March 14, 2005.

== Plans for revival ==
Posts from the Sqrambled Scuares Facebook page since late May 2020 indicate the show is returning in a "virtual television game show" format. At least two pilot episodes have been produced since June 2020 with "temporary faux prizes".
