= Professor Yes 'n' No =

American television series

Professor Yes 'n' No is a syndicated television game show which aired in the United States in 1953, in which viewers at home were the contestants. Its main claim to notability is that it was hosted by Bill Cullen, who was very popular with viewers from the 1950s to 1980s. Aired in a 15-minute time-slot (11.5 minutes excluding prizes announcements and commercials; by comparison, the usual running time for 15-minute series was at least 12 minutes excluding ads), the series was set in a classroom, with Cullen dressed up as a teacher. He would ask a series of true or false questions, and asked viewers to write down their response. He would ask a total of 13 questions, with one additional question asked by an announcer on the station airing the show. Viewers wrote down a 15th question of their own, which was used as a tie-breaker.

The show tried to avoid being "radio with pictures" by using a blackboard in some of the questions (in one episode, Cullen slammed his hand, covered in chalk, on the blackboard during a question about mafia symbolism), and by sometimes having Cullen hold props related to the question.

A total of 26 episodes were produced, which were distributed by Screen Gems.

== Reception ==
Billboard, in its October 3, 1953 edition, reviewed the series and said "Altho the show is not as jolly as one might expect from Cullen, it is interesting and simple and ought to pull in some tangible audience response."
