= This Amazing America =

American old-time radio musical and quiz program

- Genre: Quiz and music
- Country of origin: United States
- Language: English
- Syndicates: NBC-Blue
- Starring: Bob Brown
- Original release: February 16 – June 28, 1940

This Amazing America is an American old-time radio musical and quiz program that ran from February 16, 1940, to June 28, 1940, on NBC-Blue. A different program with the same title was broadcast later on NBC-Red.

== Format ==
The quiz portion of the program featured audience participation as members of the studio audience attempted to answer questions about America that had been sent in by listeners. Participants formed two three-person teams to answer questions Members of the winning team received $25 each, and the grand prize was $169.50 (equal to the ticket price for a Grand Circle Tour by the sponsor, Greyhound bus company. Most of the questions dealt with American geography.

== Personnel and schedule ==
Bob Brown was the host and quizmaster. The Ranch Boys sang, accompanied by Roy Shields and his orchestra. This Amazing America was initially broadcast on NBC-Blue on Fridays from 8 to 8:30 p.m. Eastern Time. On May 3, 1940, it was moved to 9:30 - 10 p.m. ET, still on Fridays.

== Reception ==
A review of This Amazing America in the trade publication Billboard found its advertising to be the best part of the show. The reviewer thought that questions in the quiz were too difficult, and the program was summarized by saying, "In last analysis, it isn't a quiz show but a travelog in question and answer form." The reviewer complimented the music, saying that the show would be more entertaining if the Ranch Boys performed for all of it.

== Later program ==
By 1942 This Amazing America was the title of a different type of program on NBC-Red. Tom Terris narrated and provided voices for parts in stories in the 10:30-10:45 a.m. ET Sunday show. Bob Hamilton provided organ music.

== Film ==
A Technicolor film, This Amazing America was produced by Greyhound in 1940. It was related to the radio program only in that it had the same title and sponsor. The film featured a tour of the United States with stops at sites including Yellowstone National Park, Niagara Falls, and the Grand Canyon. By 1943, it had been seen by more than 7 million people in the United States. In that year, the U. S. Office of War Information released prints for distribution in Russia, with the title changed to North America by Bus.
