= Smush =

American game show

- Genre: Game show
- Presented by: Ken Ober; Lisa Dergan
- Country of origin: United States
- Original language: English

Production
- Running time: 30 minutes
- Production companies: Diplomatic Productions; Greengrass Productions; Jellyvision

Original release
- Network: USA Network
- Release: December 3, 2001 – June 21, 2002

Smush is an American game show which aired on the USA Network on December 3, 2001, to June 21, 2002. Hosted by Ken Ober and Lisa Dergan, the show features contestants competing to form a portmanteau given clues.

== Gameplay ==
The show, set in a basement party atmosphere, featured four contestants trying to "smush" the answers to clues together to create a portmanteau. For example, the clue "A New England state + 'Flying Circus' man" would result in an answer of "Vermonty Python," formed by combining "Vermont" and "Monty Python". Smushes did not have to use the exact spelling of both words. For example, "Belly Lafghanistan" could be a combination of "belly laugh" and "Afghanistan".

=== Rounds 1 and 2 ===
Ober read toss-up sets of clues whose answers had to be smushed together. A correct buzz-in answer scored points, while a miss gave the opponents a chance to steal. Round 1 used pairs of clues worth one point each; the clues were read aloud during the first part of the round, then both read and presented visually near its end.

Questions in Round 2 were worth two points each. Most of these were asked as "Smush Tri's," with three answers to be smushed together, but some involved participation by stage crew members and had only two clues. The final question was a "Smush Quad," requiring four answers and awarding three points.

The lowest scorer at the end of each round was eliminated from the game.

=== Round 3 (Smush Chain) ===
Ober read seven toss-up clues, one at a time; after each one, a contestant had to buzz in and smush together the answers to all clues up to that point in order to score. The answer to the first clue was always a standalone word or phrase and was not smushed with anything else. An example of a completed chain might be "Leap Yeardrum Major Tommy Thompson Twin Cities," by combining "Leap Year," "eardrum," "drum major," "Major Tom," "Tommy Thompson," "Thompson Twins," and "twin cities." The first clue was worth one point, the second clue was worth two points, and so on up to seven for the last clue. The high scorer at the end of this round won the game and advanced to the Money Round.

=== Money Round ===
Dergan wrote a word or phrase on a mirror with lipstick, which served as one half of five smushes that the champion had to solve in 45 seconds. Ober read one clue at a time, whose answer had to be smushed onto either the beginning or ending of the given word. (For example, given the word "inbred" and the clue "Tom Sawyer's partner and star of his own Mark Twain book," the correct answer would be "Huckleberry Finbred," obtained by smushing "Huckleberry Finn" ahead of "inbred.") The champion could pass on a clue and return to it after playing through all five if time allowed, but a miss put the clue out of play. He/she won $8,000 for solving all five smushes before time ran out, or $1,000 per correct answer otherwise.

== Critical reception ==
Noel Holston of Newsday gave the show a mostly-positive review. He praised the show for increasing the difficulty in later rounds, and for mixing pop culture and "broader knowledge". Although he was critical of the show's "low budget" visuals and payments to winners, and critical of Dergan's role in the show, he ultimately described it as "contagiously enjoyable if you're the sort who loves puns and wordplay." Writing for a Dallas Morning News article which was reprinted in The News Tribune, Kevin McDonough said that the show "has the casual feel of a game played during a long car ride or at a party."
