= Second Honeymoon (game show) =

Canadian game show

- Genre: Game show
- Created by: Wink Martindale
- Directed by: William G. Elliot
- Presented by: Wayne Cox
- Announcer: Doc Harris
- Composer: Ed Lojeski
- Country of origin: Canada
- Original language: English
- No. of seasons: 1

Production
- Executive producer: Wink Martindale
- Producer: Jerry Gilden
- Production locations: Vancouver, British Columbia
- Camera setup: Multi-camera setup
- Running time: 22 minutes
- Production companies: Northern Lights Media Corporation; Martindale/Gilden Productions

Original release
- Network: Global Television Network; CBN (United States)
- Release: September 2, 1987 – September 2, 1988

Second Honeymoon (spelled as 2nd Honeymoon on its titlecard) is a Canadian game show that was hosted by Wayne Cox. Wink Martindale created and produced the show with his then-business partner Jerry Gilden, and radio personality Doc Harris was the announcer.

The Vancouver-based show aired on CBN from September 2, 1987, to May 1988 (with reruns aired until September 2, 1988) in the US, and on the Global Television Network in Canada.

== Gameplay ==
Modeled on The Newlywed Game, three couples and their children (comprising three teams of four to eight people) answered questions to win (as the title says) a second honeymoon. The children were asked a series of multiple-choice questions in the style of Newlywed to see how much they knew their parents.

The game was played in three rounds, with the first two rounds having two multiple-choice questions and the last round having a single free-response question.

=== Round 1 ===
In round one, the kids were asked two questions to see how much they knew their mothers. They predicted how their mothers would answer the same questions. A correct match on the first question was worth 20 points, while a correct match on the second question was worth 40 points.

=== Round 2 ===
In round two, the kids were asked two more questions except they predicted how their fathers would answer the questions. A correct match on the first question was worth 60 points, while a correct match on the second question was worth 80 points.

=== Round 3 ===
In the final round, the kids along with their mothers independently predicted how the fathers would answer one last question, with the responses written on sheets of paper provided to the family. Each match was worth 100 points (for a possible total of 300 points & a possible overall grand total of 500 points).

The family with the most points at the end of the game won the grand prize - the second honeymoon. If two or all three teams were tied, another question was asked, with first family getting a match being declared the winner.
