= USA Gonzo Games =

1991 American game show

USA Gonzo Games is a game show that aired on the USA Network from October 6 to December 29, 1991. Mark L. Walberg made his debut as a game show host on this series. The show was produced by Stone Stanley Productions.

== Premise ==
Ten contestants (5 male and 5 female) competed in various stunts that tested their endurance.

Each episode was set up in a tournament format, with the top 2 male and female contestants being announced as the winners. Unlike most game shows, USA Gonzo Games did not offer prizes.
