= Crush (American game show) =

- Presented by: Andrew Krasny
- Country of origin: United States
- Original language: English

Production
- Running time: 30 minutes
- Production companies: Zoo Productions; Love You Productions

Original release
- Network: USA Network
- Release: March 2000 – August 2000

Crush is a game show which aired on USA Network from March to August 2000. The series was also broadcast in Canada on YTV's teen-oriented "Limbo" block. It was hosted by Andrew Krasny and was known as "The show that begs for an answer to the question, "Should friends try love?".
