= Talk About (game show) =

Canadian television series

- Genre: Game show
- Created by: Mark Maxwell-Smith
- Directed by: Michael Watt
- Presented by: Wayne Cox
- Announcer: Dean Hill; Doc Harris
- Country of origin: Canada
- Original language: English
- No. of seasons: 2
- No. of episodes: 260

Production
- Executive producers: Pat Ferns; Don Taffner
- Producers: Deborah Sanderson (1988–1989); Chris Paton (1988–1989); Steven Glassman (1989–1990); Lawrence McDonald (1989–1990)
- Production locations: CBC Studios; Vancouver, British Columbia
- Camera setup: Multi-camera
- Running time: 22–26 minutes
- Production company: Comedia Productions

Original release
- Network: CBC
- Release: October 17, 1988 – March 16, 1990

Talk About is a game show produced in Canada by CBC Television, which bears some similarities to the board game Outburst. Originally produced by CBC for the 1988–89 season, it was later picked up for American television syndication, airing from September 18, 1989, to March 16, 1990, with repeats later airing on the USA Network from June 28 to December 31, 1993; on GameTV from January 3, 2011, to September 2015; from July 1, 2019, to September 12, 2021; and since February 28, 2022; and on Buzzr starting May 30, 2022. Taped at stage 40 at the CBC Vancouver studios via local station CBUT in Vancouver, British Columbia, the show was hosted by Wayne Cox with local radio personality Dean Hill as announcer, while Doc Harris (announcer on Cox's previous show Second Honeymoon) filled in for Hill during Season 1.

During its original run on CBC, a concurrent prime time edition titled Celebrity Talk About was also added, which premiered on January 10, 1989.

== Gameplay ==
Two teams of two people, one team usually returning champions, played.

Control of the game alternated between teams, starting with the champions. The team not in control for a particular round was stationed at a desk to the side of the play area, wearing headphones and standing with their backs to the opponents so they could neither see nor hear anything. The captain of the playing team chose one of two subjects offered by Cox and decided which member would play first.

Each team member was given 20 seconds to describe the subject, attempting to match as many keywords as possible in a list of 10 secretly chosen by the show's producers. If the team said every word, they scored 10 points and received a CA$500 bonus. Otherwise, the opposing team was shown the words that had not been said and could offer one guess as to the subject. A correct guess scored one point for each word that had been said, while a miss awarded the points to the first team.

Play continued in this manner until one of the teams reached 15 points. The first team to do this won the game and CA$100, and advanced to the bonus round, while the losing team received parting gifts. During Season 2, all players received a copy of the Talk About home game.

Games could straddle from the end of one episode to the start of the next. This rule was changed for celebrity specials; when time ran out at the end of an episode, the team in the lead won the game and received prizes for the charity sponsoring them; any tie would result in teams playing sudden-death rounds.

If a team managed four wins, they would play a fifth and final match called the Grand Game; if they won, they would receive the Grand Game Jackpot and retire undefeated. The jackpot was a prize package worth CA$1,000 in the first season; during the second season, it began at this value and a prize was added every time a champion team was defeated, to a maximum of CA$10,000.

== Bonus round ==
The winning team played the bonus round for a bonus prize and up to CA$2,000 in cash.

The team captain chose one of two prizes to play for and one of two topics to discuss. They then decided which member would speak first, and their partner entered an isolation booth. As in the main game, the talking player had 20 seconds to say as many keywords as possible from a list of 10. Each word awarded CA$100; if the talking player said all of them, the team immediately won CA$2,000 and the prize.

If the first player did not get all ten words on the list, the remaining words were shown on the screen and they were given a choice to either stop and take the money from the words that were said, or try and double the money and win the prize. In order to do that, their partner would be tasked with saying one of the words they had not said. The partner was given one second for every word the first player had correctly said, and if they managed to say one of the remaining words within that time, the team won the prize and doubled their money. If not, they lost everything.

== Foreign adaptations ==
A UK version of the show hosted by Andrew O’Connor ran for three years on ITV from 1990 to 1993. The only difference was in the bonus round, where each word was worth £20, and at the end, the player had two options: "doubling", by having their partner say any unsaid word or "double-doubling" (4 times the pounds) by having them say a specific word within a time limit of 1 second per word already said.

Lars Gustafsson hosted a Swedish version called Prata på! which ran briefly on TV4 in the mid-1990s. In the bonus round, each word was worth 500 kronor, and the "doubling" option required the partner to say any one of the unsaid words within a time limit of one second per word already said.

An Irish version of the show was broadcast by RTÉ in the early 1990s on Saturday nights, presented by Ian Dempsey. The show was brought back to RTÉ in the mid-1990s and was this time presented by Alan Hughes. After each team took two turns at talking, the higher scoring team played the bonus round in which each word earned £10 and one second for the other player to say one of the remaining words if the first player took the double-or-nothing option.

A Japanese version of the show was broadcast on Fuji TV titled 『クイズ!早くイッてよ』 (lit. "Quiz! Hurry and Go") from May 28, 1989, until September 27, 1992, hosted by Sekine Tsutomu. During the run of the show, there were two co-hosts: Tanaka Misako and Ayako Arana. The series worked slightly differently than the original show. When a team plays they keep what they earn, while if an opponent steals, they receive the remaining points available. During the second year of the show onward, the team picked a lucky monitor and if that team revealed an answer from there during their turn, they received two bonus points. Whichever team earned the most points at the end of round one battled against two celebrities (usually a comedic duo). The losing team goes home with 1,000 yen times the number of points they earned. During the celebrity round, the co-hosts played with both teams. The team that receives the most points after that round goes on to the bonus. The bonus round was played usually for a vacation. The first person that went earned seconds with each answer on the board; if their partner guessed one of the remaining answers within the time limit they won the trip, and if not, they went away with parting gifts.
