= The Big Date =

- Presented by: Mark L. Walberg
- Country of origin: United States

Production
- Running time: 25 minutes
- Production company: Lighthearted Entertainment

Original release
- Network: USA Network
- Release: June 17, 1996 – September 19, 1997

The Big Date is an American dating show hosted by Mark L. Walberg, which aired on the USA Network from June 17, 1996, to September 19, 1997. Notably, the series featured a young Jon Hamm as a contestant on one episode. Susan Powter and Hank Steinberg also appeared as participants.

== Round 1 ==
One bachelor/bachelorette chose one of three members of the opposite sex to try & hook up with. Host Walberg asked up to three questions to the potential couple, all of which have two choices marked "A" or "B". They made their choice individually by pressing a button corresponding to one of those letters (in earlier episodes, there were hands marked with those letters). The objective was to match their answers, and it took two matches to become a couple. If the possible couple mis-matched twice, they sat back at their own chairs. Along the way (after one match), one player could stay with the current possible mate, trade one possible mate for another, or can choose to take the "mystery man"/"mystery woman" (whoever was behind a door on either side of the set). Sometimes when choosing the door, out would come Bert Dinkel (in case of the guy, he became Fern Dinkel); if that happened, that player was out of the game and another player stepped in. As soon as two players made the two matches, they became a couple and they moved on to round two. As soon as two couples were formed, that is when round two began.

== Round 2 (Me or Not Me) ==
The two formed couples played the next round to see who's more compatible than the other. Host Walberg read a series of statements in which the answers were always either "Me" or "Not Me". A typical question would go like this: "Me or Not Me, I've eaten a bug." or like this "Me or Not Me, I never got along with my parents." Like in the first round, the idea was to match answers with each other and the couple with the most matches won the game and advanced to the bonus round.

== Bonus Round ==
In the bonus round, host Walberg read true/false questions to the winning couple and each correct answer won $50.

The bonus went through two different formats in its year-plus-long run.

=== Format 1 ===
In the first format, Mark read six true/false statements about the mates and their behaviors (three for each mate), the mates themselves replied to those questions before the show. Now it is up to the partner to guess if the statement is either true or false. After the partner gave his/her answer, the mate whom the question was about announced the answer he/she gave beforehand. A correct match earned the couple $50 and matching on four questions invited the couple back on Friday's show for a trip to Jamaica.

=== Friday Jamaica Drawing ===
On Friday shows, the couples who made the required four matches were entered in a drawing. Their names were put into a hat and whoever couple's names were drawn first won the Jamaican vacation.

=== Format 2 ===
In this bonus format, host Walberg gave statements about dating. Some were real facts, some were from opinion polls, others were just made up. On each statement, the couple decided whether the statement was either true or false. Each correct answer was worth $50 and if the couple got six right in 60 seconds or less they won $300 and a trip.
