= Jay Wolpert =

American television producer and screenwriter (1942–2022)

- Born: Jay Sheldon Wolpert; January 29, 1942; The Bronx, New York City, New York, U.S.
- Died: January 3, 2022 (aged 79); Los Angeles, California, U.S.
- Occupations: Television producer; Screenwriter
- Years active: 1969–2020
- Spouse: Roslyn Granowitter (m. 1967)
- Children: 2

Jay Sheldon Wolpert (January 29, 1942 – January 3, 2022) was an American television producer and screenwriter.

== Early life ==
Wolpert was born in The Bronx, New York City.

== Career ==
=== Early career ===
His first television appearance came as a contestant on the original version of Jeopardy! in 1969. He competed in the Jeopardy! Tournament of Champions that year and won. Wolpert's upset win was notable for defeating the two highest-winning contestants in regular Jeopardy! play up to that point, Jane Gschwend and Elliot Shteir.

=== Game show production ===
Wolpert began his game show-producing career working for Dan Enright in Canada. He later worked as a producer and creator of game shows for Chuck Barris Productions and Goodson-Todman Productions. While at Goodson-Todman, he served as producer of The Price Is Right with Bob Barker from 1972 until 1978 and also created the game show Double Dare with Alex Trebek for CBS, which ran for a short time in 1976 (not to be confused with the later, unrelated show that premiered a decade later on Nickelodeon with Marc Summers).

Wolpert left Goodson-Todman to form his own production company Jay Wolpert Productions, and his first game show was the 1979 series Whew! for CBS with Tom Kennedy. Wolpert produced the series with Burt Sugarman for most of its run. Whew! was canceled in May 1980 after a thirteen month run, and Wolpert did not return to television with a series until January 1983, despite shooting several pilots in the interim. Briefly, he was VP of program development at Metromedia after Whew! got cancelled. On January 3, 1983, Wolpert's Hit Man debuted on NBC with Peter Tomarken as its host. Hit Man lasted thirteen weeks on the air.

Five years later in 1987, and after a failed syndication pilot based on the board game Trivial Pursuit with Steve Morris (the game would get two other shows based on it, one in 1993 and one in 2008, both incorporating interactive elements), Wolpert returned to daytime television with the series Blackout for CBS. Debuting on January 4, 1988, in place of The $25,000 Pyramid with Dick Clark, the Bob Goen-hosted Blackout ended after thirteen weeks of episodes and was replaced by a revival of Family Feud with Ray Combs (which began airing on July 4, 1988); new episodes of The $25,000 Pyramid aired for thirteen weeks after Blackout's cancellation.

In 1990, Wolpert launched a new series on the Lifetime network based on a pilot he had shot in 1981 with Tomarken as host. On February 5, 1990, Rodeo Drive debuted with comedian Louise DuArt hosting. Rodeo Drive ended its run on August 31 of that year; the show had aired twelve weeks of new episodes prior to that and had been in reruns until the program was removed from Lifetime's lineup.

After a hiatus, Wolpert returned to the Goodson Productions team in 1993 after serving as president of Jay Wolpert Enterprises, and produced a new The Price Is Right series for Goodson and Paramount Television. The New Price Is Right with Doug Davidson debuted in syndication in September 1994, with Wolpert producing. Ratings for The New Price Is Right were lacking, resulting in a cancellation after sixteen weeks in January 1995.

In 1996, Wolpert and The Family Channel teamed up for two series. One was Wait 'til You Have Kids with Tom Parks, a series based on The Parent Game with Clark Race. The other was Shopping Spree with Ron Pearson, which ran for nearly two years and was Wolpert's longest-running game show in his company's history. After Shopping Spree went off the air in August 1998, Wolpert's company stopped producing programming. He was executive producer of the 1998 version of Match Game with Michael Burger.

Wolpert was listed as a consultant during the credits of Who Wants to Be a Millionaire? with Chris Harrison during the 2015–16 season, and had some input in that season's format changes.

=== Screenwriting and acting ===
Wolpert turned to screenwriting, penning the script for The Count of Monte Cristo (2002) and receiving a story credit for all films of the Pirates of the Caribbean series.

His minimal acting experience included playing the OB-GYN in Father of the Bride Part II who tells Diane Keaton's character Nina Banks (née Dickerson) that she is pregnant.

== Death ==
Wolpert died in Los Angeles from complications of Alzheimer's disease on January 3, 2022, at the age of 79.

== See also ==
- List of notable Jeopardy! contestants
