= Beat the Clock =

American television game show

- Genre: Game show
- Presented by: Bud Collyer; Jack Narz; Gene Wood; Monty Hall; Gary Kroeger; Paul Costabile
- Narrated by: Bern Bennett; Dirk Fredericks; Gene Wood; Nick Hollinrake; Jack Narz; John Cramer
- Country of origin: United States
- No. of seasons: 8 (1950–1958); 3 (1958–1961); 5 (1969–1974); 1 (1979–1980); 1 (2002–2003); 1 (2018–2019)
- No. of episodes: 910 (1969–1974); 93 (1979–1980); 93 (2002–2003); 40 (2018–2019)

Production
- Running time: 22–26 minutes
- Production companies: Mark Goodson-Bill Todman Productions (1950–1961, 1969–1974, 1979–1980); Clock Productions (1969–1974); The Clock Company (1979–1980); Fremantle (2002–2003, 2018–2019); Paxson Entertainment (2002–2003); Tick Tock Productions, Ltd. (2002–2003)

Original release
- Network: CBS Primetime
- Release: March 23, 1950 – February 23, 1958
- Network: CBS Daytime
- Release: September 16, 1957 – September 12, 1958
- Network: ABC
- Release: October 13, 1958 – January 27, 1961
- Network: Syndication
- Release: September 15, 1969 – May 24, 1974
- Network: CBS
- Release: September 17, 1979 – February 1, 1980
- Network: Pax TV
- Release: September 2, 2002 – September 4, 2003
- Network: Universal Kids
- Release: February 6, 2018 – July 8, 2019

Beat the Clock is an American television game show. Contestants attempt to complete challenges such as physical stunts within a time limit in order to win prizes. The show was a creation of Mark Goodson-Bill Todman Productions.

The show began on radio as Time's A-Wastin' in 1948, hosted by Bud Collyer, and changed its name to Beat the Time on January 5, 1949. The show moved to television on the CBS nighttime schedule starting on March 23, 1950. On September 16, 1957, CBS premiered an afternoon version of the show as well, which ran for a year. The nighttime show was cancelled on February 16, 1958, and the afternoon program followed on September 12, 1958.

Soon, the show moved to ABC's daytime schedule, and ran from October 13, 1958 to January 27, 1961. A brief revival aired on CBS from September 17, 1979 to February 1, 1980.

From 2002 to 2003, another revival which was filmed at Universal Studios Hollywood, aired on PAX TV, with Gary Kroeger hosting.

In 2006, the show made up the third segment of Gameshow Marathon, a seven-part summer series that aired on CBS, with Ricki Lake as host and Rich Fields as announcer.

The most recent revival aired on Universal Kids from February 6, 2018 to July 8, 2019.

== 1950–1961 ==
The first edition of Beat the Clock was a production of CBS and aired there until 1958. The show then moved to American Broadcasting Company where it stayed until 1961. Bud Collyer emceed the original series.

Contestants were required to perform tasks (called "problems" by Collyer) within a certain time limit which was counted down on a large 60-second clock. If they succeeded, they were said to have "beaten the clock"—otherwise, "the clock beat them". The show had several sponsors over its run, with the most longstanding being the electronics company Sylvania.

=== On-air personalities ===
Substitute hosts on the original version included Bill Hart (1951), John Reed King (1952), stunt creator Frank Wayne (1953), Bob Kennedy (1954), Win Elliot (1955), and Sonny Fox, who became Collyer's permanent substitute from 1957 to 1960. Collyer was referred to in the introductions as "America's number one clockwatcher", and the fill-in hosts were each named "America's number two clockwatcher".

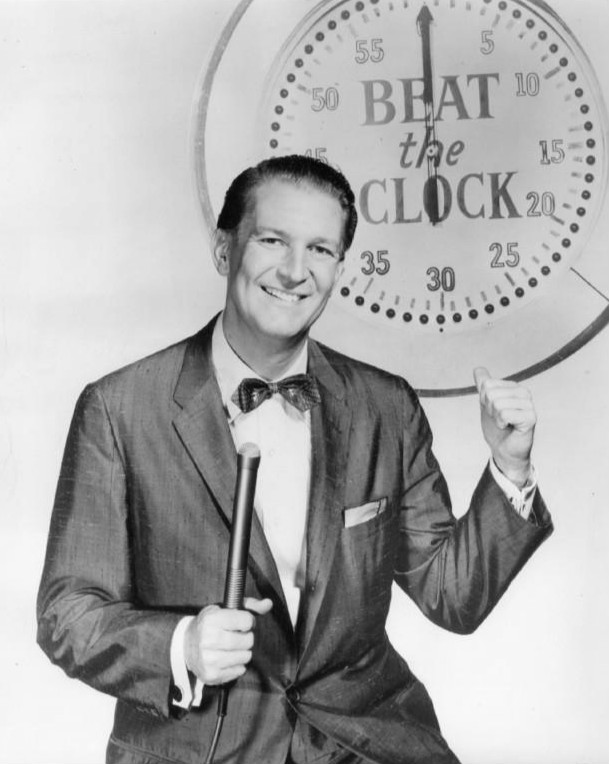
Bud Collyer as the show's host, 1958.

The show had several female on-air assistants. The original hostess was Roxanne (née Delores Evelyn Rosedale). Roxanne was replaced by Beverly Bentley in August 1955. Bentley's departure in 1956 coincided with Hazel Bishop's sponsorship and a period of having no main assistant (see production changes below). She reappeared as one of the models on the original version of The Price Is Right for its entire run.

The announcer for the show's run on CBS was Bernard ("Bern") Bennett until 1958. In October 1957, Beat the Clock ran a contest inviting viewers to submit drawings of what Bennett, who was never shown on camera, might look like. Over 20,000 viewers participated, and winner Edward Darnell, of Columbus, Indiana, was flown in to appear with Bennett on the December 2, 1957, show. When Beat the Clock moved to ABC, Dirk Fredericks became the announcer. Substitute announcers included Lee Vines, Bob Sheppard, Hal Simms, and Dick Noel.

=== Contestants ===
Contestants were chosen from the studio audience and usually were married couples. Other pairs were engaged, dating, or had a familial relationship. Collyer would ask them general questions (usually including where they were from and how long they'd been married) and usually asked if they had children, their ages and genders. Sometimes the couple would bring children on the show.

Occasionally, if there was going to be a messy stunt, the husband would come out dressed in a plastic jumpsuit. Similarly, wives would sometimes play in their "street clothes", but sometimes the women would appear in a jumpsuit because their own clothing might be too cumbersome or perhaps fragile.

=== Game format ===
==== Main Game ====
One couple competed against the clock to win a prize in stunts that required one or both members of the couple. The stunt was described and the time limit was set on a giant onstage clock. The time limit was always a multiple of 5 seconds, usually at least 30 seconds. At one point Collyer said that a 55-second time limit was the maximum, but later on, stunts occasionally had 60-second limits. On the primetime edition, the first stunt was called the $100 clock. If the couple beat the $100 clock, they moved on to the $200 clock and the same rules applied. If they failed to beat the $100 clock, they received a consolation prize worth less than $100. If they failed to beat the $200 clock, they got a prize worth more than $100. On the daytime versions, couples continued playing as long as they kept beating the clock, with various prizes awarded for each victory.

==== Jackpot Clock ====
On the primetime version, if the couple beat the $200 clock, the wife would play the jackpot clock in which the words of a famous saying or quote were scrambled up on a magnetic board and that phrase had to be unscrambled in 20 seconds or less. If successful, then the couple won the Jackpot Prize. If not, they got a prize worth more than $200. Occasionally, when the wife of the couple did not speak English very well, the husband was allowed to perform the jackpot clock.

The jackpot clock and the Bonus Stunt would provide the templates for the traditional quiz show bonus round, which would become a TV staple, starting in 1950 with the bonus question round on You Bet Your Life.

In the show's earliest set design in available episodes, there was a round display near the contestants mirroring the clock. This display had three rings of light like a target. The outer ring would light during the $100 clock, the middle ring for the $200 clock, and the center circle would light during the jackpot clock. This feature was removed in later set designs.

==== Bonus Stunt ====
Some time during every episode (between normal stunts), a bell would sound. The couple playing at the time would attempt the Bonus Stunt for the Bonus Prize that started at $100 in cash. If the stunt was not beaten, it would be attempted the next week with $100 added to the prize. When it was beaten, it was retired from the show and a new Bonus Stunt began the next week at $100. The bonus (as the name suggests) did not affect the regular game, and win or lose the couple continued the regular clocks wherever they left off. Beginning in August 1954, the starting amount for each Bonus Stunt was raised to $500, still increasing $100 each week.

Bonus Stunts were harder than the usual $100 and $200 clocks and sometimes reached $2,000 and even $3,000 on rare occasions. The first time the Bonus reached $1,000 was on February 28, 1953, when it was won for that amount. In 1956, the Bonus Stunt was replaced by the Super Bonus.

==== Super Bonus Stunt ====
In response to the big money prizes on other networks' game shows, CBS talked Mark Goodson into increasing the stakes on Beat The Clock. Ultimately the plan was unsuccessful as the ratings never did improve much, perhaps leading to the end of the Super Bonus. Starting on February 25, 1956, after the last regular Bonus Stunt had been won, it was replaced by the super bonus which started at $10,000 and went up by $1,000 every time a couple failed to beat the clock. Unlike with the regular bonus stunt and the "Big Cash Bonus Stunt" that followed it, the Super Bonus was attempted by every couple who qualified by beating the $200 clock. Originally the stunt was played at the end of the show by each couple that qualified, and "because of the high prize value" a special timing machine made by the Longines company was used, which was touted as the most accurate portable timer available. Probably realizing that seeing the same stunt a few times in a row was a bit boring, they moved the Super Bonus right after the $200 clock and before the jackpot clock on March 17, dropping the Longines clock.

Partway through the run of the second Super Bonus, a rolling desk/table with dollar value of the bonus printed on it was used to roll out the props for the stunt. This carried over to the Big Cash Bonus Stunt. It is notable that in the earliest surviving episodes from 1952 that air, the original bonus had a similar desk with the value of the bonus on it. The desk was done away with for several years until the idea was reused in 1956.

==== Big Cash Bonus Stunt ====
Starting on September 22, 1956, the bonus reverted to the original Bonus Stunt format (attempted once per episode by whatever couple heard the "bonus bell" ringing). The Jackpot started at $5,000 and increased $1,000 every week it was not won. If successful, the couple left the show with the top prize. Otherwise, they continued on with the regular game.

==== Bonus Cash and Prize Stunt ====
Featured on the daytime version. A lucky couple had a chance to win a bundle of cash and their choice of a new car or boat. To win, they had to successfully complete their Bonus Stunt. Like the original Bonus Stunt, the cash value started at $100, going up each time the stunt was not successfully completed. The largest cash bonus won on the daytime edition was $20,100 during its years on ABC, setting a record for daytime TV winnings in the post-scandal era.

=== Stunts ===
The stunts performed on the show were mostly created by staff stunt writers Frank Wayne and Bob Howard. In the early days of the show, playwright Neil Simon was also a stunt writer. The stunts were usually aimed towards fun with difficulty being secondary. The stunts would usually be constructed out of common household props such as cardboard boxes, string, balloons, record players, dishes, cups, plates, cutlery, and balls of almost every type. As was the case with many other game shows during television's infancy, the budget was low. Before he became famous, actor James Dean was a stunt tester on the show.

The stunts performed varied widely, but there were some common themes. Most stunts in some way involved physical speed or dexterity. Contestants often had to balance something with some part of their body, or race back and forth on the stage (for example, releasing a balloon, running across the stage to do some task, and running back in time to catch the balloon before it floated too high). Often the challenge was some form of target practice, in terms of throwing, rolling, bowling, etc.

The setup for the stunt was often designed to look easy but then have a complication or gimmick revealed. For example, Collyer would say "All you have to do is stack four plates", check the clock to see how much time they had to do it, and then add "Oh, and one more thing...you can't use your hands". Common twists included blindfolding one or both contestants, or telling them they could not use their hands (or feet or any body part that would be obvious to use for whatever the task was).

The other common element in the stunts was to get one of the contestants messy in some way often involving whipped cream, pancake batter, and such (usually limited to the husband of the couple).

=== Prizes ===
Prizes varied depending on the era of the show and the sponsor at the time. During Sylvania's tenure as sponsor (which began in March 1951), consolation prizes for losing the $100 clock were usually a Sylvania radio.

- $100 clock prizes included Michael C. Fina silverware sets, a collection of four Knapp-Monarch small kitchen appliances, or a Hoover upright, among others.
- $200 clock prizes included International-Harvester refrigerators, air conditioning units (usually in the summer), a Tappan range/oven, a James dishwasher, Speed Queen washers and dryers (they were only offered separately) and small Sylvania TVs. All of these prizes, except the Sylvania radio, were shown on "art cards" and not actually brought out on the show.
- The Jackpot Prize during Sylvania's tenure was always a Sylvania television set. Sometimes a hi-fi stereo/phonograph (with "famous surround sound") was included with the television, and it was noted that the Jackpot Prize was "worth more than $500". A notable (and often pointed out) feature of Sylvania's TVs at the time was the "halo light", which was an illuminated "frame" around the image which was supposed to have made watching the image easier on the eyes, similar to the "AmbiLight" feature on some modern television sets.

From 1956 and for the rest of the show's run on CBS, the Jackpot Prizes usually consisted of a Magnavox Color TV, Fedders air conditioners (usually awarded as a pair), Westinghouse washer and dryer pairs, and refrigerators, Hardwick ranges, Whirlpool freezers, and Easy "Combomatic" combination washer-dryers.

== 1969–1974 ==
On September 15, 1969, Beat the Clock returned to television in five-day-a-week syndication. This series continued to air until September 20, 1974. For the first season (1969–1970), the show was taped at The Little Theatre on Broadway in New York City, sharing the stage with The Merv Griffin Show and The David Frost Show. After that, taping moved to Montreal, Quebec as a cost-saving measure. This was the only time Goodson-Todman taped a series in Canada that was not for a Canadian-specific audience. The show was broadcast by CTV in Canada.

Jack Narz hosted the first three seasons of the series before leaving and his announcer, Gene Wood, replaced him for the remainder of the run. Wood's announcer position was filled by Nick Hollinrake.

The music for this version of Beat the Clock was played live on the organ by keyboardist and arranger Dick Hyman.

=== Jack Narz (1969–1972) ===
In early episodes, couples, now aided by a weekly celebrity guest, played for points simply by completing stunts. The first couple to reach 100 points won a prize package. This was subsequently changed to the couples receiving a prize every time they won, which was later replaced by the winning couple facing a "cash board" with "BEAT THE CLOCK" spelled out on three levels, each letter concealing a money amount: either $25 (4), $50 (5), $100 (2), or $200. The couple would agree on a letter, select it, and the winnings would be revealed.

In addition, if a couple completed a stunt in less than half the time, the remaining time would be used for awarding a cash bonus. Anywhere from $10 to $50 would be awarded for each time the stunt was completed in the time remaining.

At some point during the show, the celebrity would perform a "Solo Stunt" (which seemed to have supplanted the Bonus Stunt on the original show). The couples won $50 if they guessed correctly whether the star could beat the clock or vice versa. Towards the end of Narz's tenure as host, stunts would be replaced in the second half of the show with the celebrity playing a game of intuition with the couples, who would play for a cash prize that was divided among them.

During this time, the show was syndicated through 20th Century Fox Television. One curious aspect of this version of the show was that Narz's suit jackets sported an embroidered patch of the show's Beat The Clock logo sewn onto the left breast. This practice was similar to hosts Jim Lange and Bob Eubanks' wearing logo patches from The Dating Game and The Newlywed Game respectively, and also the scrambled "mystery logo" seen on Hugh Downs' (and later Bob Clayton's) blazer when they hosted Concentration.

=== Gene Wood (1972–1974) ===
Jack Narz left the show in 1972. At the time, he made no announcement and gave no reason for his departure. In a 2007 Internet radio interview, Narz finally explained that the show's budget did not include his personal travel expenses. Narz had to pay for his travel, and the cost of airline fare between his Los Angeles home and Montreal became prohibitive. His travel costs were essentially equal to his earnings, and even a successful appeal to Mark Goodson for more money was not enough.

Announcer Gene Wood hosted the show for the next two seasons. Wood had also been hosting a similar stunt game titled Anything You Can Do, a battle of the sexes competition which was also recorded in Canada. CFCF-TV Montreal staff announcer Nick Hollinrake became the show's announcer (he had previously announced for a week during Narz's final season in which Wood was the celebrity guest). At this time, the show also changed syndicators to Firestone Syndication Services, which syndicated another Goodson-Todman show, To Tell the Truth, which had originally been hosted by Bud Collyer.

The show was now called The New Beat the Clock (although the logo still read simply "Beat the Clock"), and the set was refreshed with a new color scheme and a redesigned clock. Like his predecessor, Wood also wore suit jackets with the show's logo sewn on the pockets.

The only changes in the format were that couples were introduced separately and played two stunts, win or lose (a win still getting a trip to the Cash Board), and both couples competed simultaneously in a final stunt, with the winning couple receiving a prize. Celebrity guests were retained in the new format, once again aiding the contestants, and performing the Solo Stunt as well as "co-judge" with Wood in the final stunt of the day. Another throwback to the Collyer era (when the show was seen in the daytime) was the revival of "Ladies' Day", where women only (not counting the celebrity for that week) would play the game.

Despite continued popularity on local stations in both daytime and prime time access timeslots, Goodson-Todman decided to discontinue production of Beat the Clock in 1974 when the Canadian government asked the company for half of the proceeds from advertisers awarding their wares as contestant consolation prizes. Wood returned to voice-over work, and went on to a 20-year career announcing Los Angeles-based shows for Goodson-Todman and occasionally other packagers.

== 1979–1980 ==
In 1979, CBS elected to bring the series back as All-New Beat the Clock for its daytime schedule. Production moved to CBS Television City, taping in Studio 31 and marking the first time a Beat the Clock series originated from Los Angeles. The series premiered on September 17, 1979, at 10:00 a.m., replacing reruns of All in the Family in the time period, preceding Whew!. Monty Hall, who had not hosted a game show his company did not produce since he was host of Heatter-Quigley's Video Village, was the emcee for the series while former host of the 1970s syndicated series, Jack Narz (who Hall replaced on Video Village) served as his announcer and a series producer. The show faced competition from NBC's Card Sharks. (ABC did not start programming until 11:00 a.m.)

There were two theme songs used (both composed by Score Productions). The second one was performed live in the studio by a small band led by Arthur B. Rubinstein.

Two couples, one usually a returning champion, competed against each other and the clock. The champion couple (or champion-designate if the previous episode had ended with a retiring champion couple) wore red sweaters while the opposing couple wore green.

=== Rounds 1 and 2 ===
The first two rounds began with the couples competing against each other in a stunt worth $500 for the winner. One stunt usually featured the women of the couples, while the other featured the men, though the other partner sometimes had to help as well. The stunts were conducted for 60 seconds and were either races against the clock to perform an objective or competitions to outscore the opponent in the stunt before the clock ran out. In the former case, the clock was run as a fail safe, and if neither couple managed to complete the stunt, the team furthest along won.

Hall would then bring the winning couple across the stage to compete in a stunt by themselves for an additional $500. After Hall described the stunt and what both partners had to do, the clock was set and the couple had to complete the stunt in the allotted time. Doing so won the $500, but failure to do so did not.

=== Bonus Shuffle ===
After the first two rounds, both teams squared off in a modified table shuffleboard game called the "Bonus Shuffle".

The teams took turns throwing pucks down the shuffleboard table. The team leading had the advantage of throwing three pucks and going first, followed by the other team with two pucks. If there was a tie, a coin was tossed with the winners going first and there were two pucks per side. The table had eight stripes on it, and each stripe had a higher dollar amount on it. The first stripe was worth $300 and each subsequent stripe was worth $100 more, with the stripe at the very end of the table worth $1,000. There was just enough space in between the stripes where a puck could land and not score any money. Pucks had to remain on the table to count, and if a puck failed to reach the first stripe it was taken off the board and discarded. The teams were allowed to try to knock each other's pucks off the board if they so desired but did so at their own risk, as they could just as easily knock their own puck off the board or push a puck up the board and onto a higher value.

The team whose puck was furthest along on the board after all pucks had been thrown won the money attached to the space their puck was touching and became the day's champions. They then moved on to play the Bonus Stunt for ten times the amount of their Bonus Shuffle total. In the event of a tie, each team threw one puck. The first puck's landing spot was marked and the other team had to beat the mark to win.

=== Bonus Stunt ===
The Bonus Stunt round was conducted the same way as the solo stunts were. Hall would give the objective of the Bonus Stunt to the champion couple, then the clock would be set and the couple had to complete the stunt before time ran out. If they did so, as previously mentioned, they won ten times their Bonus Shuffle score for a maximum of $10,000 and a new Bonus Stunt would be played on the next show. If a Bonus Stunt was played five consecutive times without a couple managing to complete it, the stunt would be replaced with a new one.

Couples continued to appear until they were either defeated or surpassed $25,000 in total winnings.

=== The All-New All-Star Beat The Clock ===
On November 5, 1979, the show switched to an all-celebrity format. The changes that were made included:

- Celebrity pairs played for designated rooting sections (a la Tattletales, another Goodson-Todman game of the 1970s) of the audience which split the winnings.
- Both rooting sections could be seen on-camera.
- Stunts in the first two rounds were only worth $250 for the rooting sections.
- If the winning team completed the bonus stunt, $1,000 went to their rooting section while the remaining money went to their favorite charity.
- Both star teams remained on the show for a week. The pairings stayed the same on four of the five days, with the teams changing colors (the red team on Monday and Thursday was the green team on Tuesday and Friday). On Wednesdays, the teams switched, although still one man and one woman per team. There was one exception: on January 17, 1980, after Charile Brill had won all six head-to-head stunts against Bobby Van (four with his wife, Mitzi McCall, and two with Bobby's wife, Elaine Joyce), Bobby and Charlie competed on the same team against Elaine and Mitzi.
- In case of a tie going into the Bonus Shuffle, a coin toss determined who went first.
- In the last two weeks of the run, after each head-to-head stunt, both teams got to perform the next stunt, with the losing team from the previous stunt going first. If both teams performed this stunt within the time limit, whoever finished faster received the $250.
- The theme song was now an upbeat version of the first one used in its run (it was previously used going into and out of the commercials of the earlier episodes), and was performed live in the studio.
- Monty Hall stopped using a handheld microphone and started using a clip on microphone.

== 2002–2003 ==
This version, the show's previous appearance other than the Gameshow Marathon special, aired daily from September 2, 2002, to September 4, 2003, on PAX TV (the first week of shows was called a "preview week"). Taped in Universal Studios Florida, and hosted by former Saturday Night Live cast member Gary Kroeger (who was also busy announcing Whammy! The All-New Press Your Luck), three couples with a pre-existing relationship, competed in this version with no returning champions. The couples were distinguished by color—red, blue, and gold.

=== Round 1 ===
To start the game, all three couples faced off in a stunt. The first couple to complete the stunt got 10 points and the advantage of having to play a 30-second solo stunt first, as well as the ability to assign the stunts to the other teams—prior to gameplay the couple was shown 3 items on a tray that represented the stunts themselves, picked one for themselves to play, and divided the other two among the remaining players.

Before the playing of each stunt, a two-part trivia question was asked. (In some episodes partners must answer the question both individually without conferring with their partner, in other episodes couples were allowed to confer on both answers.) Answering it correctly gave the team 10 extra seconds to complete the stunt and both parts had to be answered correctly, in order to get those 10 seconds. 10 points were given for completing the stunt with one additional point for each second remaining on the clock (for example, if a couple completed a stunt with three seconds remaining, they scored 13 points for the round).

=== Round 2 ===
The second round consisted of two parts. The first part was another face-off stunt, i.e. trying to throw a ring around a pole the other player is wearing on their head. In a stunt like this, the first place couple's ring tosser would be closest to their partner, the second place couple would be slightly further back, and the third place couple would be the furthest back (the first place couple was always given an advantage, with the second having less of one and the third the least). Play continued until two of the couples completed the stunt, with those two teams continuing on.

The two remaining couples were then shown the stunt they would have to attempt. After the stunt was described, another trivia question was asked. In this case, the female half of the couple was given the option to answer it, have her partner answer it, or pass it to the other team to make them answer. If the couple answered correctly they would be given control, but if they did not the opponents did. The two couples then bid down from a base time of two minutes to see who could complete the stunt in the fastest amount of time, and bidding continued until one team challenged the other to beat the clock. The stunt was then played, and if the challenged couple completed it they won the game and advanced to the bonus game. If they were not successful, the challenging couple won the game.

=== Bonus Round ("The Swirling Whirlwind of Cash and Prizes") ===
The winning couple played the "Swirling Whirlwind of Cash and Prizes", which took place inside a machine similar to a vertical wind tunnel. $25,000 in cash was inside the machine, as well as several "prize vouchers" (coloured slips of paper with the names of prizes written on them). Several more vouchers would be tossed into the machine by Kroeger prior to the start of the round.

Once inside the machine, both players tried to grab as much money and prize vouchers as they could within a 1-minute time limit. For protection, the couple was equipped with goggles and gloves that they wore while in the machine. There were three rules that had to be followed at all times. One, only items that were in the air could be grabbed and neither teammate could bend over and pick anything up from the ground; however, if any vouchers or cash had somehow gotten stuck in a pile they were permitted to kick the pile to get it loose. Two, each item that they grabbed had to be placed in a bag which the male partner wore around his waist in order to be counted. Three, once the clock stopped the couple both had to stop whatever they were doing and raise their hands in the air. Later in the run, several gold certificates were added to the machine and if the couple picked one up, the cash they had grabbed would be doubled. (If the couple somehow picked up more than one, only one was counted.)

The "swirling whirlwind" was previously used in the bonus round of The Diamond Head Game, a show hosted by Bob Eubanks in 1975.

=== Pilot ===
The pilot version featured a slightly different format. Also, no trivia questions were asked at all. Three couples competed (red, blue and gold), however instead of competing for points, teams competed to add time to their score. Each team was given a consolation of thirty seconds to start with. Likewise with the later regular format, teams competed in an opening stunt, which the winning team will receive ten seconds to their score. The team who won the opening stunt, likewise with the standard format, chose out of a group of items represented to each challenge, to assign to each team. The teams would win twenty seconds for completing the challenge, and also would get bonus time added to their score, for how much time left (if any) was on the clock when they completed the challenge. (if a team finished with ten seconds left on the clock, they would win ten seconds). The next round would feature something unique to the pilot version, and would have the teams predicting whether a random person in the studio audience would successfully, or unsuccessfully beat the clock, in addition to how much of their time they are willing to wager, with a correct prediction adding time, and an incorrect prediction losing time. The two teams with the most time would proceed. The final two teams, likewise with the regular format, would bet on a challenge, from a base time of three minutes. With the team who beat the challenge, or successfully bid the other team to not complete the challenge, going onto the bonus round. Also unlike in the regular format, if the team who made it to the bonus round, whether it was the team who participated in the challenge and won, or the team that successfully bid, they were given an additional thirty seconds added to their score. The bonus round featured the "swirling whirlwind" machine, and depending on how much time a team received in the game, was how much time they would be allowed inside the machine. However unlike in the regular format where both team members were allowed to grab cash except from directly off the ground onto the cash bag of the male partners belt, one partner was suspended from the top of the machine in a harness and is the only one allowed to grab anything in the machine, and must put whatever they grab into the other partners bag, with the other partner not being allowed to touch anything but the cash bag. Teams would win whatever cash and prizes were in the bag.

=== Specials ===
During the 2002/2003, PAX TV run of Beat The Clock, several special episodes were done.

One hour long $100,000, special episode, featured a massive amount of eight teams of two couples (sixteen contestants altogether), competing. Although a similar format and setup was used, there were slight changes. The opening stunt, which was performed outside the studio at Universal City Walk, eliminated two of the teams, leaving six. The six remaining teams then went inside the regular studio, and were put into three of the standard teams (red, blue and gold), but with four members each. Each team would compete in an un-timed challenge, competing against the other members in their team, with the winning couple of that team moving on. So essentially three more teams would be eliminated, leaving three. At this point a standard episode with an identical format would be played with the three remaining teams. One major change however, would be that the bidding challenge would require one team to complete the challenge, while riding Popeye & Bluto's Bilge-Rat Barges. The team that made it to the bonus round, would go onto the "swirling whirlwind" where cash and prizes were upgraded to total $100,000. During the program, vintage clips of previous incarnations of Beat The Clock throughout the decades would be played as well.

== 2018 ==
On October 12, 2017, Universal Kids announced that it had ordered a revival of Beat the Clock from FremantleMedia North America, which premiered on February 6, 2018. The new version (taped in Los Angeles, making it the second version taped there) features children and adults competing as teams and was hosted by Paul Costabile.

=== Game Format ===
Two teams of two kids or one kid and their adult relative, one dressed in purple and the other dressed in green, compete in a race against time filled with stunts & challenges. There are three rounds of stunts.

The first round is worth $100/stunt and the second round is worth $150/stunt. The third and final round is a head-to-head challenge for $300 for a possible grand total of $550. Both teams get to keep the cash, but the team with the most money at the end of round three wins the game and goes on to try to Beat The Big Clock for over $2,000. In the event of a tie, whoever completes the task first, or does the most tasks within the time limit in the head-to-head wins. If neither teams complete the challenge and are still tied, whoever has the most money wins.

=== The Big Clock ===
The winning team has 60 seconds to complete one final four-part stunt. Each part completed is worth $250, and completing all four parts wins the team $2,000, along with a $1,000 donation to a children's charity of the team's choice.

== International versions ==
Country	Local name	Host	Channel	Year aired
Australia	Free for All	Ugly Dave Gray	Nine Network	1973
Canada	Beat the Clock^{1}	Jack Narz (1969–1972); Gene Wood (1972–1974)	CTV	1969–1974
Germany	Nur Nicht Nervös Werden	Joachim Fuchsberger	ARD	1960–1961
New Zealand	Beat the Clock	Rodney Bryant	TV2	1975–1976
United Kingdom	Beat the Clock; Segment on Sunday Night at the London Palladium	Tommy Trinder (1955–1958); Bruce Forsyth (1958–1960, 1961–1962); Don Arrol (1960–1961); Norman Vaughan (1962–1965); Jimmy Tarbuck (1965–1967)	ITV	1955–1967
United Kingdom	Beat the Clock	Jim Dale	ITV	1973–1974
United Kingdom	Beat the Clock; Segment on Seaside Special '87	Mike Smith	BBC1	1987
United Kingdom	Beat the Clock	Bruce Forsyth	ITV	2000

^{1}Aired in both U.S. and Canada for both markets

== See also ==
- Minute to Win It
