= Anything You Can Do =

Anything You Can Do may refer to:

- "Anything You Can Do" (Desperate Housewives), an episode of Desperate Housewives
- "Anything You Can Do" (I Can Do Better), a song by Irving Berlin
- Anything You Can Do (game show), a Canadian game show hosted by Gene Wood
- Anything You Can Do (novel), a 1963 science fiction novel by Randall Garrett, writing as Darrel T. Langart
