= Isolation booth =

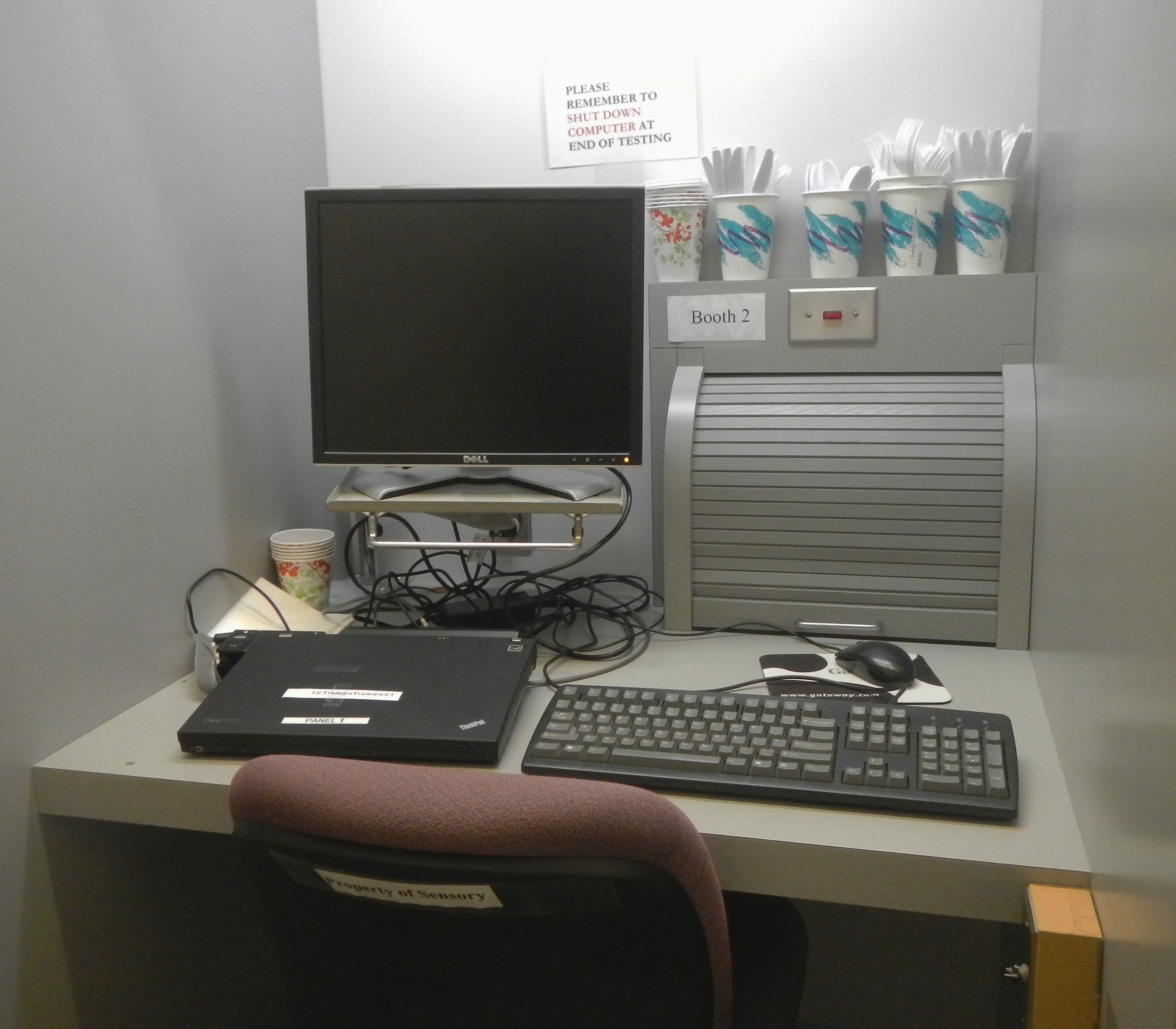
Isolation booth of a blind taste test lab

An isolation booth is a cabinet used to prevent a person or people from seeing or hearing certain events, usually for television programs or for blind testing of products.

Its most visual use is on game shows, where an isolation booth (either portable or built into the show's set) is in use to prevent a contestant from hearing their competitor's answers, or in the case of Family Feud, their fellow family member/friend's response to the "Fast Money" survey questions. Examples of the former include Twenty-One, Win Ben Stein's Money, 50 Grand Slam, Raise the Roof, The $64,000 Challenge, Scrabble, Whew!, Solitary and Double Dare (the 1976 version entitled as such unrelated to the children's game show). Another use is to prevent the audience from shouting the answer to them, as seen on The $64,000 Question, The $1,000,000 Chance of a Lifetime, and Name That Tune.

Further measures may be taken to prevent the occupant from seeing/hearing anything that occurs outside the booth, such as a blindfold or sleep mask, or headphones that play music or are equipped with noise-cancelling technology.

The isolation booth concept has been used for comic effect at times. One example is the "Cone of Silence" used as a running gag on the comedy series Get Smart. This was a clear plastic device that fitted over the heads of Maxwell Smart and the Chief, intended to let them discuss sensitive issues without being overheard, but which often malfunctioned. Another variation appeared on the game show Idiot Savants, as the "Cylinder of Shush," a plastic tube lowered over the contestant's head that muffled the host's questions somewhat.

== Recording studios ==
In sound recording, an isolation booth is a small, acoustically separated room within or adjacent to a studio's live room that allows one sound source to be recorded with minimal leakage (spill) from other sources being played or recorded at the same time. Booths are commonly used to isolate a vocalist, a guitar amplifier, or a drum kit so that each signal can be captured on its own track and processed independently during mixing. Their internal acoustic treatment varies with purpose: some are made relatively "dead" with absorptive material to reduce reflections, while others retain a degree of natural ambience.

== Use as punishment ==
Some schools in the United Kingdom use "isolation booths" as a place of detention, being a small room in which a disruptive child is forced to sit alone and in silence, as part of a policy known as "occupy and ignore". In some cases, children have been punished in this manner for 22 hours in one week. In 2019, a child attempted suicide through overdosing, while confined to such a booth.

== See also ==
- Acoustic board
- Recording studio
