= Home & Family =

US television program

- Genre: Talk
- Presented by: Chuck Woolery; Cristina Ferrare; Michael Burger; Paige Davis; Mark Steines; Debbie Matenopoulos; Cameron Mathison
- Country of origin: United States
- No. of seasons: 9
- No. of episodes: 1609

Production
- Running time: 104–108 minutes
- Production companies: H and F Productions; Woody Fraser Productions

Original release
- Network: The Family Channel (1996–98); Hallmark Channel (2012–21)
- Release: April 1, 1996 – August 4, 2021

Home & Family (formerly The Home and Family Show) is an American daytime talk show. The series originally premiered on April 1, 1996, on The Family Channel, and was dropped by the network immediately prior to its 1998 relaunch as the Fox Family Channel. In 2012, Hallmark Channel picked up a revival of the series, airing as a two-hour program on weekday mornings.

The show premiered on April 1, 1996, on The Family Channel and ran until August 14, 1998. It was hosted by Cristina Ferrare and Chuck Woolery, and featured numerous recurring and regular personalities known as "the family" who share tips on beauty, crafts, cooking, and the like. Originally among the family were Jamie Gwen (chef), Candace Garvey (lifestyles), Mayita Dinos (gardening), Bob Golic, and the Carey brothers (carpentry and home repairs).

In December 1996, Woolery was fired due to complaints about the show being two hours and was replaced by Family Challenge host Michael Burger.

Home & Family was revived in 2012 on the Hallmark Channel, unique with the daily guest star being asked to remain for the entire episode, providing a broader view of the star's personality and interests. Crew members are often seen, as well.

The revived show's ninth season became its last, following cancellation by Hallmark Channel in March 2021. The final episode aired on August 4, 2021, with hosts Debbie Matenopoulos and Cameron Mathison.

== History ==
Home & Family is a two-hour daily Hallmark series that was recorded before a studio audience on Tuesdays and Thursdays, in Los Angeles, California. Steines said that the decision for that was made to encourage actors to be on the show, without having to wake at 4:00 a.m. The focus of the show is simply entertainment and tips within a "wholesome image". Discussions on current events or politics are avoided and speech is censored; as an example, the word "breast" was forbidden.

The series originally aired on The Family Channel but ended on August 14, 1998, one day before the channel became Fox Family Channel, which included a major restructuring of the network's programing. Its revival began on October 1, 2012, and moved to its current home, the Hallmark Channel. Mark Steines and Paige Davis co-hosted the show but Davis left after six weeks on November 16, 2012, with her final episode being taped the day before she was replaced by Cristina Ferrare, who in turn was replaced by Debbie Matenopoulos.

The show continued on to season two where it premiered on September 30, 2013. Then on April 30, 2014, Home & Family was renewed for a third season, which premiered on September 15 of that same year. It was announced on April 14, 2015, that season four was approved and along with that notice they announced that the show would air new episodes weekly throughout the entire year.

Ferrare's departure was abrupt and the audience was not given any explanation nor any notice prior to her departure. On June 21, 2016, Hallmark Channel confirmed that Ferrare would no longer co-host the show with Steines; former co-host of The View Debbie Matenopoulos was named as her replacement. In a statement via Facebook, Ferrare addressed her exit: "It's really very simple, Home and Family will have a season 5 which I am so happy for and the Network decided that they want a new co-host and that will be Debbie. She will do a great job!"

In late May 2018, Steines was fired abruptly from the series. On May 31, 2018, Hallmark announced the news via a Twitter post that they had "parted ways," and at the end of the following day's episode, while surrounded by team members, Matenopoulos gave an emotional, vague and praise-filled announcement to the viewing audience of Steines being "no longer with" the series. It was later reported that there were no complaints about Steines' behavior and that the show was merely taking a different creative direction. Steines' contract had not expired and he was not informed until after he had taped what was his last show. On July 26, 2018, Cameron Mathison was named as Matenopoulos' new co-host, to assume his position in September with the launch of the seventh season.

On July 26, 2019, the series was renewed for an eighth season. Production of the series and all other Hallmark Channel original content was suspended on March 13, 2020, due to the COVID-19 pandemic. The series returned for a ninth season in September 2020, before production was suspended again in December 2020 per recommendations by Los Angeles County health officials (with repeats of the program and Hallmark Channel original movies airing in its timeslot). In March 2021, it was reported that Home & Family would resume production on March 29, with first-run episodes resuming on April 5 in a new one-hour format, airing on Monday, Tuesday and Wednesday mornings. On March 23, Hallmark Channel announced that Home & Family had been cancelled, and would air its final episode on August 4, 2021.

== Hosts ==
=== Final hosts ===
- Debbie Matenopoulos (2016–2021)
- Cameron Mathison (2018–2021)

=== Former hosts ===
- Chuck Woolery (1996)
- Michael Burger (1996; 1997–1998)
- Cristina Ferrare (1996–1998, 2012–2016)
- Paige Davis (2012)
- Mark Steines (2012–2018)

== Final "family" ==
- Kym Douglas (lifestyle/beauty expert)
- Orly Shani (sewing, crafts, and style)
- Ken Wingard (decor, DIY)
- Shirley Bovshow (gardening)
- Lawrence Zarian (fashion)
- Paige Hemmis (DIYs, Lifestyle Design Expert)
- Ali Fedotowsky (Lifestyle & DIY expert)
- Larissa Wohl (Pet adoption expert)
- Maria Provenzano (DIY Expert)
- Tamera Mowry-Housley (Lifestyle Expert, DIYs, recipes & more)
