= Gene Wood =

American game show announcer (1925–2004)

- Gene Wood in an on-camera appearance on the finale of Card Sharks in 1981.
- Born: Eugene Edward Wood; October 20, 1925; Quincy, Massachusetts, U.S.
- Died: May 21, 2004 (aged 78); Boston, Massachusetts, U.S.
- Occupations: Television personality; announcer; game show host
- Years active: 1951–1998
- Spouse: Carleen Anderson (m. 1960)
- Children: 3

Eugene Edward Wood (October 20, 1925 – May 21, 2004) was an American television personality, known primarily for his work as an announcer on various game shows. From the 1950s to the 1990s, he announced many game shows, primarily Mark Goodson–Bill Todman productions such as Family Feud, Classic Concentration, Card Sharks, Password, and Beat the Clock. Wood also served a brief stint as a host on Beat the Clock, and on another show, Anything You Can Do. After retiring from game shows in 1996, Wood worked as an announcer for the Game Show Network until his retirement in 1998.

== Early life ==
Wood was born in Quincy, Massachusetts. He served in the Army Air Forces during World War II. Wood majored in speech and theater at Emerson College.

== Career ==
=== Early career ===
Wood wrote one episode for The Arlene Francis Show in 1958. His early career included stand-up comedy, television commercials, and writing for Bob Keeshan of Captain Kangaroo fame. This work included a Terrytoons-produced cartoon series, The Adventures of Lariat Sam, which aired on the Captain Kangaroo show. Wood also supplied voices and sang the theme song. Wood also had a comedy career, often pairing with partner Bill Dana, performing their comedy act at nightclubs. Wood with Jay Burton wrote one episode for When Things Were Rotten, "The French Dis-connection", in 1975.

=== Announcing ===
Wood's first role as a game show announcer came as a substitute on the ABC version of Supermarket Sweep and The Soupy Sales Hour in 1966. In 1969, he began working for the first time as an announcer for Mark Goodson-Bill Todman Productions on their show Beat the Clock. He was previously known to have worked for Goodson & Todman as an audience warm-up man for Password in 1967.

Wood also simultaneously hosted the 1971–72 season of the Don Reid-produced Anything You Can Do, which featured teams of men competing against teams of women in stunts similar to Beat the Clock. In 1972, Wood left that show and ascended to host of Beat the Clock after the departure of Jack Narz, with Nick Holenreich serving as Wood's announcer. The show ended production in 1974.

Wood then became a regular announcer for Goodson–Todman in Los Angeles, working as voice-over for many of the company's game shows. In addition to his role as announcer, he regularly served as a warm-up act for the audiences on these shows, and often performed a series of comedy skits. His work in 1974 for Goodson-Todman included Now You See It (CBS, 1974–75) and Tattletales (CBS, 1974–78); he also appeared as a celebrity panelist on one week of Match Game that year.

Perhaps Wood's most famous role was as announcer on the original version of Family Feud. The original version, hosted by Richard Dawson, ran on ABC from 1976 to 1985. When Family Feud was revived in 1988 with Ray Combs as host, he announced on that version as well through the 1994–1995 season, during which Dawson returned as host. Wood guest-starred as himself during a Feud-themed episode of the ABC sitcom Angie in 1979, and would also be heard as Feud's announcer on a similar episode of the NBC sitcom Mama's Family in 1983.

Wood frequently announced multiple versions of the same show; the next such instance was Card Sharks. The show's first incarnation, starring Jim Perry, ran from 1978 to 1981 on NBC, while two concurrent revivals (one on CBS and another in syndication, hosted by Bob Eubanks and Bill Rafferty, respectively) ran from 1986 to 1989. Wood also served as the main announcer for Password Plus and Super Password from 1979-82 and 1984-89, respectively; and for Match Game-Hollywood Squares Hour from 1983-84 and for a revival of Match Game in 1990-91.

After the 1985 death of the original announcer Johnny Olson on the Bob Barker version of The Price Is Right, Wood was one of four interim announcers on that show, until Rod Roddy was chosen as Olson's successor. At that same time, he also announced on the nightly syndicated version hosted by Tom Kennedy that ran for the season. According to former producer Roger Dobkowitz, between Barker, Goodson, and Dobkowitz himself, they felt that his voice was a little on the harsh side and was unsuitable for the show, despite his experience. He also filled in for Olson during the final weeks of Body Language. (Wood returned to Price briefly in 1998 to read the summer rerun fee plugs.)

Other shows on which Wood served as a regular announcer were Double Dare (CBS, 1976–77), Showoffs (ABC, 1976–78), The Better Sex (ABC, 1977–78), Child's Play (CBS, 1982-83), Trivia Trap (ABC, 1984–85), Love Connection (Syndication, 1985–1988), Bruce Forsyth's Hot Streak (ABC, 1986), Classic Concentration (NBC, 1987–91), Win, Lose or Draw (Syndicated, 1987–90), Baby Races (Family Channel, 1993–94), and Family Challenge (1995–96). Prior to his retirement in the late 1990s, Wood also did voiceovers for the Game Show Network.

== Personal life and death ==
Wood married Carleen Anderson in 1960. They had two daughters, Sasha and Mia, together. He had one son, Timothy, from a previous marriage. Wood retired to Adamsville, Rhode Island in the 1990s. In June 1991, Wood underwent gallbladder surgery which forced him to miss several tapings of Classic Concentration and Family Feud and as a result, Art James subbed for Wood on both Concentration and Feud.

Wood was actually close friends with his fellow game show colleagues, especially Bert Convy, Richard Dawson and Ray Combs. After Combs' suicide in 1996, Wood felt devastated over the loss and chose not to return to Family Challenge for its second season when Michael Burger became host out of respect of Combs' family. Wood even spoke at Combs' funeral. On Thanksgiving 1996, Game Show Network aired a Family Feud marathon with Richard Dawson and Wood as hosts, at the end of the marathon, Wood appeared and delivered an emotional tribute to Combs.

Wood was a heavy smoker and in 1999, Wood was diagnosed with lung cancer. Wood died on May 21, 2004 at the age of 78.

Preceded by New television show	Family Feud announcer 1976–1995	Succeeded by Burton Richardson (1999–2010)
Preceded by Rich Jeffries on Super Password	Super Password announcer 1984–1989	Succeeded by End of series
Preceded by Rod Roddy	Announcer on Love Connection; 1985–1988	Succeeded by Rich Jeffries (1988)
Preceded by New television show	Card Sharks announcer 1978–1989	Succeeded by Gary Kroeger (2001)
