= Fred Travalena =

American comedian (1942–2009)

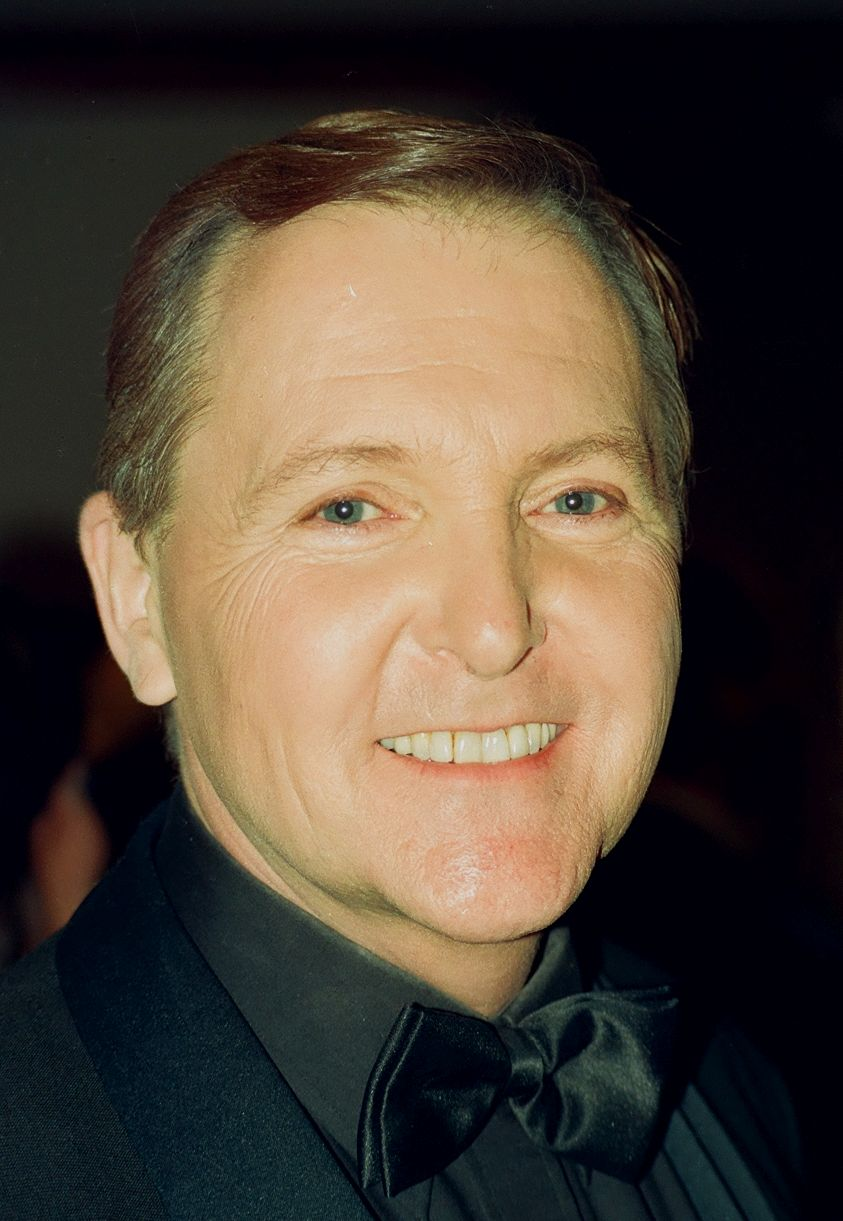
- Travalena in 1999
- Born: Frederick Albert Travalena III; October 6, 1942; Bronx, New York, U.S.
- Died: June 28, 2009 (aged 66); Encino, California, U.S.
- Spouse: Lois Travalena (m. 1970)
- Children: Cory James and Frederick Albert IV

Comedy career
- Years active: 1962–2009
- Medium: Stand-up, television
- Genre: Observational comedy
- Subjects: Impersonations, pop culture

Frederick Albert Travalena III (October 6, 1942 – June 28, 2009) was an American entertainer, specializing in comedy and impressions.

== Early life ==
Bronx, New York-born and Long Island-raised, Travalena moved to Los Angeles and developed a multifaceted career with his characterizations of visible public figures.

== Career ==
His television credits began in the 1970s, as a regular performer on The ABC Comedy Hour, where he once did a split screen impression of John Lennon on one side and Paul McCartney on the other, and the Dean Martin roasts. He had several voice credits on cartoons, as well as appearances on nationally broadcast children's programs.

Travelena made many guest appearances on game shows and dramatic programs in the 1970s, 1980s and 1990s. In the mid-1980s he hosted the game show Anything for Money (1984–85), a game where contestants attempted to guess how much money it would take an ordinary, unsuspecting person to participate in a silly stunt.

In 1978, Travalena portrayed Top-40 DJ "Mad Man" Mancuso in The Buddy Holly Story, starring Gary Busey in the title role.

Among his guest appearances on game shows, he was on Password Plus, hosted by Tom Kennedy, with Dallas star and The Huggabug Club star Audrey Landers, as well as Super Password and Body Language, hosted by Tom Kennedy and Bert Convy, and appeared on Match Game and Match Game-Hollywood Squares Hour several times.

In 1982, Travalena played Bogey Orangutan (in his Humphrey Bogart voice) from Shirt Tales. He also voiced Dreamy Smurf on The Smurfs.

In 1989, Travelena played Elvis Presley and Mr. Gibbel of the Chippie Chipmunks group in a comedy sketch as part of The Super Mario Bros. Super Show!. For the Macy's Thanksgiving Day Parade later that year, he portrayed the Joker. He guest starred in the series premiere of the short-lived 1991 sitcom Good Sports with Ryan O'Neal and Farrah Fawcett. After an actor impersonated Michael Jackson during the 1992 MTV Video Music Awards to accept the Best Alternative Music Video award on behalf of Nirvana, presenter Dana Carvey bemusedly joked, "Fred Travalena does an amazing Michael Jackson!"

In 1993, Travalena hosted the game show Baby Races, which aired on the Family Channel for 26 episodes from September 12, 1993 to March 6, 1994.

Between 1998 and 2000, he voiced Julius Caesar (with a voice that was an impression of Frank Sinatra), William Clark, Marc Antony (both with an impression of Dean Martin), President Gerald Ford and many others on the Kids' WB's animated series Histeria!.

He appeared at casino theaters in Las Vegas, Reno, and Atlantic City, as well as performing arts theaters, cruise ships, and private "in-concert" performances. He took part in a U.S.O. tour to entertain troops overseas, and was honored in 2004 by Club Italia with a Merit Achievement Award for his contributions to society. Also in 2004, he appeared on Bananas Comedy.

On February 3, 2005, he received a star on the Hollywood Walk of Fame at 7018 Hollywood Blvd.

== Death ==
Travalena was diagnosed with non-Hodgkin lymphoma in 2002 and prostate cancer in 2003. Following five years' remission, the lymphoma returned in 2008. Travalena died on June 28, 2009, at his home in Encino, California.

During his life, he and his wife credited his battle with cancer as a challenge of their Christian faith and a way to help others overcome the same conditions.
