= Burt Sugarman =

American film and television producer (born 1939)

- Born: Burton Roy Sugarman; January 4, 1939 (age 87); Los Angeles, California, U.S.
- Occupations: Film and television producer, businessman- founder of Burt Sugarman Productions, part company owner of Barris Industries
- Spouses: Pauline Schur (m. 1957; div. 1961) Carol Wayne (m. 1975; div. 1980) Mary Hart (m. 1989)
- Children: 2

Burton Roy Sugarman (born January 4, 1939) is an American film and television producer best known for creating and producing the iconic 1970s/early '80s variety series The Midnight Special, which served as a showcase for popular musical groups of the time.

Sugarman also produced the 1970s game shows Celebrity Sweepstakes, Whew! and The Wizard of Odds, and the short-lived series The Richard Pryor Show. During 1979, Sugarman also owned shares in Old Tucson Corporation, which owned the Old Tucson and Old Vegas amusement parks in Arizona and Nevada.

In the 1980s, he produced the motion pictures Kiss Me Goodbye, Extremities and Children of a Lesser God. He was the executive producer of the film Crimes of the Heart in 1986 and television series The Newlywed Game 1988. He was also part owner of Barris Industries (later known as the Guber-Peters Entertainment Company) before it was sold to Sony in 1989. During the late 1980s, he was a member of The Giant Group, which had investments in media firms like Reeves Entertainment Group and television broadcaster/cable system operator/newspaper owner Media General.

== Personal life ==
Sugarman married television personality and talk show host Mary Hart in 1989; they have one son. He had previously been married to Pauline Schur and to the late actress Carol Wayne, and was engaged to actresses Ann-Margret and Myrna Hansen.

== Producer (as EP) ==
Year	Title
1969	Dionne Warwick: Souled Out (TV special)
1970	The Switched On Symphony (TV special)
1970	Changing Scene (TV Special)
1970	Changing Scene II (TV Special)
1971	Changing Scene III (TV special)
1971	Changing Scene IV (TV Special)
1971	Stand Up and Cheer (TV series) (EP: 2 episodes)
1971	The Manipulator
1972	The Jud Strunk Show (TV special)
1972–1981	The Midnight Special (TV special, then series; producer)
1973	The Wizard of Odds (TV series)
1974–1976	Celebrity Sweepstakes (TV series; co-produced with Ralph Andrews Productions)
1977	The Richard Pryor Special? (TV special)
1977	The Richard Pryor Show (TV series)
1977	Billboard No. 1 Music Awards (TV special)
1979–1980	Whew! (TV series; co-produced with Jay Wolpert Productions; previously a Bud Austin production)
1982	Kiss Me Goodbye
1986	Extremities
1986	Children of a Lesser God
1986	Crimes of the Heart (EP)
1988	The Newlywed Game (TV series)
1990	Mary Hart Presents Love in the Public Eye (TV special)

== Himself ==
Year	Title
1974	Rock Concert (TV series)
1983	The Last Fight
1988	The 2nd Annual American Comedy Awards (TV Special)
2008–2010	Entertainment Tonight (TV series)
