= Tonight at the London Palladium =

British TV variety show (since 1955)

- Also known as: Sunday Night at the London Palladium; The London Palladium Show; Sunday Night at the Palladium
- Genre: Variety show
- Created by: Val Parnell
- Presented by: Original series: Tommy Trinder (1955–1958); Bruce Forsyth (1958–1960, 1961–1964, 1998, 2000); Don Arrol (1960–1961); Norman Vaughan (1962–1965, 1974); Jimmy Tarbuck (1965–1967); Jim Dale (1973–1974); Ted Rogers (1974); Revived series: Bradley Walsh (2014–2017); Stephen Mulhern (2014); Jason Manford (2014–2015); Jack Whitehall (2014–2015); Rob Brydon (2014); Alexander Armstrong (2014–2015); Jimmy Carr (2014–2015)
- Country of origin: United Kingdom
- Original language: English
- No. of episodes: 418 (1 unaired) (Note: The edition, scheduled for 6 January 1974 was never broadcast due to a bomb scare with cuts from previous shows being used to fill in the time) (1955–1974); 27 (2014–2017)

Production
- Production location: London Palladium
- Running time: 55–60 minutes (inc. adverts)
- Production companies: ATV (1955–1974); LWT (1998, 2000); ITV Studios (2014–2017)

Original release
- Network: ITV
- Release: 25 September 1955 – 2 February 1969
- Release: 28 October 1973 – 14 April 1974
- Release: 15 March 1998
- Release: 21 April – 18 June 2000
- Release: 14 September 2014 – 14 June 2017

Related
- Live from...

Tonight at the London Palladium is a British television variety show that is hosted from the London Palladium theatre in the West End. Originally produced by ATV for the ITV network from 1955 to 1969, it went by its original name Sunday Night at the London Palladium from 25 September 1955 until the name was changed to The London Palladium Show from 1965 to 2 February 1969.

It underwent three revivals, first from 28 October 1973 to 14 April 1974 where it brought back its original name Sunday Night at the London Palladium title, second in 2000 under the title Tonight at the London Palladium, and third from 2014 until 2015 under the title Sunday Night at the Palladium, dropping London. From 2016, the show is called Tonight at the London Palladium and is presented by Bradley Walsh.

A one-off Sunday Night at the London Palladium was screened to mark Bruce Forsyth's 70th birthday in February 1998.

== History ==
The regular hosts of the show were Tommy Trinder (1955–1958), Bruce Forsyth (1958–1960 and 1961–1964), Don Arrol (1960–1961), Norman Vaughan (1962–1965, 1974), Jimmy Tarbuck (1965–1967), Jim Dale (1973–1974) and Ted Rogers (1974). Other guest comperes were: Hughie Green, Alfred Marks, Robert Morley, Arthur Haynes, Dickie Henderson, Dave Allen, Des O'Connor, Bob Monkhouse and Roger Moore.

The first ever show was compered by Tommy Trinder with Gracie Fields and Guy Mitchell being the night's big guests. The programme was one of ITV's most watched, reaching its biggest audience in January 1960 while Bruce Forsyth was the host, in an edition featuring Cliff Richard and the Shadows, watched by more than 20 million people.

However, according to the book Television's Greatest Hits written and researched by Paul Gambaccini and Rod Taylor the biggest viewing audience was 9.7 million in 1964 (although this would have been homes, rather than viewers, as this was the way British television viewing figures were recorded at the time). This was on Sunday 19 April when Bruce Forsyth introduced the Bachelors, Hope and Keen and Frank Ifield with the Pamela Devis Dancers.

After the Tiller Girls and the lesser acts in the first part was a game show imported from America, Beat the Clock, the format of which was rather like Bruce Forsyth's later hit in The Generation Game. It featured couples having to perform a trick or stunt, like even changing clothes (previously put on, on top of their ordinary clothes) with each other within a set time. If a couple could complete both stunts, the wife must rearrange words stuck to a magnetic board and people had to "arrange them into a well known phrase or saying" in 30 seconds. If she succeeded, the couple won a major prize. Whenever a bell rang, the couple who played at that time would play a jackpot stunt for a cash bonus worth £100 for each week since the last jackpot win.

The second part of the show was where the big stars shone. It featured many top people over the years including Bill Haley rocking around the clock, Chubby Checker who introduced the "new dance" the Twist to the country with a whole stage full of people dancing the Twist and Sammy Davis Jr. met the Tiller Girls in 1961. Other star guests included: Judy Garland, Bob Hope, Johnnie Ray, Liberace, Petula Clark, the Seekers, the Beatles and the Rolling Stones. Italian mouse puppet Topo Gigio came back a number of times.

The Beatles' publicist Tony Barrow said that after the band's first appearance on the show on 13 October 1963, Beatlemania took off in the UK.

The show always ended using the huge revolving stage where the Tiller Girls, the compere and that night's guests stood on it as it slowly turned around to the familiar end tune of the show.

A famous episode took place in 1961 during a strike by the British acting union Equity, who refused to allow its performers to appear that week. Exempt from this, Bruce Forsyth and comedian Norman Wisdom performed the entire show themselves.

In 1967, the head of ATV, Lew Grade, axed the show. The reasons for this remain obscure, but Grade later said that axing the series was a mistake.

== Revivals ==
=== First revival (1973–1974) ===
This revival was hosted by Jim Dale, with each episode being broadcast live. The 30 December 1973 edition was cancelled mid-broadcast due, apparently to a reported bomb scare. The scheduled 6 January 1974 edition, hosted by Jim Dale, was broadcast for the first time on Talking Pictures UK on Sunday 3 May 2020. At the end a caption stated that this episode was never broadcast and was missing most of the graphics due to a bomb scare with cuts from previous shows being used to fill in the time. When it was originally broadcast on ITV, the scheduled slot was replaced by a 1964 musical film Robin and the 7 Hoods

After 17 February 1974 edition, Jim Dale was dropped from the show and his presenting role was replaced by Ted Rogers, Ted's first edition was on 3 March 1974 and continued up until its finale on 14 April.

Series	Start date	End date	Episodes
1	28 October 1973	14 April 1974	22 (1 unaired)

=== Second revival (1998) ===
A one-off edition of Sunday Night at the London Palladium was broadcast on 15 March 1998, to celebrate Bruce Forsyth's 70th birthday. It included appearances by Diana Ross and Joe Longthorne.

=== Third revival (2000) ===
The format of Sunday Night at the London Palladium was revived in 2000 as Tonight at the London Palladium and was fronted by Bruce Forsyth. It was pre-recorded and aired on Friday evenings. The series was not a ratings success.

Series	Start date	End date	Episodes
1	21 April 2000	18 June 2000	6

=== Fourth revival (2010) ===
On 29 August 2010, Gareth Parnell's Sunday Night at the London Palladium was performed by the staff of the theatre as a one-off commemorative show for the centenary of the Palladium.

=== Fifth revival (2014–2017) ===
Sunday Night at the Palladium title card (2014)

A further revival in 2014, called Sunday Night at the Palladium began airing on ITV from 14 September 2014. The series aired for six episodes. On 19 October 2014, it was announced that the show had been recommissioned for a second revived series. This series began airing on 3 May 2015 for five episodes. Presenters of the revived series have included Bradley Walsh, Jimmy Carr and Alexander Armstrong.

From the third series onwards, it was renamed as Tonight at the London Palladium. The third series began airing on 13 April 2016. Episodes aired on Wednesday evenings and were presented by Bradley Walsh. Comedian Joe Pasquale featured in the series. Peter Andre also appeared in all episodes during the series. This series featured two old lady puppet characters called Alice and Audrey who worked at the venue's kiosk, which were designed and built by Puppets Magic Studio for ITV. Following the ratings success of the series, Tonight at the London Palladium returned for a fourth series on 19 April 2017: the puppets were in the Royal Box and called Ruby and Pearl.

==== Transmissions ====
Series	Start date	End date	Episodes
1	14 September 2014	19 October 2014	6
2	3 May 2015	7 June 2015	5
3	13 April 2016	8 June 2016	8
4	19 April 2017	14 June 2017	8

==== Episodes ====
===== 2014 =====
Episode	Original air date	Guest presenter	Guest performers
1	14 September 2014	Stephen Mulhern	Bryan Adams, Little Mix, Alfie Boe, Alan Davies, Les Beaux Freres and David and Dania
2	21 September 2014	Jason Manford	Maroon 5, Earth, Wind and Fire, Ella Henderson, Madalena Alberto, Henri White and Les 7 Doigts de la Main
3	28 September 2014	Jack Whitehall	Lionel Richie, The Script, Gemma Arterton and The Umbilical Brothers
4	5 October 2014	Jimmy Carr	Nicole Scherzinger, Kaiser Chiefs, Tommy Tiernan, Paul Heaton, Jacqui Abbott, Enra and the cast of Cats
5	12 October 2014	Bradley Walsh	Art Garfunkel, The Pierces, Sol3 Mio, Sarah Millican, Jimeoin, Jimmy Tarbuck, Diversity, Catwall Acrobats and the cast of Memphis, starring Beverley Knight, Killian Donnelly
6	19 October 2014	Rob Brydon	Neil Diamond, Paloma Faith, Texas, Milton Jones, Daniel Sloss, Kenichi Ebina, Dany Daniel and Edina and the cast of Jersey Boys

===== 2015 =====
Episode	Original air date	Guest presenter	Guest performers
1	3 May 2015	Bradley Walsh	Madness, Olly Murs, Olate Dogs, Jo Brand, Men in Coats, Alfie Boe and the cast of Billy Elliot
2	10 May 2015	Alexander Armstrong	Josh Groban, Meghan Trainor, Lee Nelson, André Rieu, Rod Woodward and the cast of The Commitments
3	17 May 2015	Jimmy Carr	Markus Feehily, Rebecca Ferguson, Deacon Blue, Vincent Simone, Flavia Cacace, Rob Beckett, Hans Klok and the cast of The Carole King Musical
4	24 May 2015	Jason Manford	Will Young, David Gray, LeAnn Rimes, Joe Lycett, The Chinese Disabled People's Performing Arts Troupe, Norman Barrett, Lang Lang, 2 Cellos and the casts of Bugsy Malone and The Producers
5	7 June 2015	Jack Whitehall	Simply Red, Jess Glynne, EL Squad, Jack Dagger, The Unkillable Jenny, Leona Lewis, Sara Pascoe and Jack Carroll

===== 2016 =====
Episode	Original air date	Guest performers
1	13 April 2016	Andrea Bocelli, Birdy, Tommy Tiernan, Globe of Death and the cast of Motown: The Musical
2	20 April 2016	Cyndi Lauper, Ronan Keating, Diversity, Diablo Troupe, the Royal British Legion Band & Corps Of Drums Romford and the cast of Kinky Boots
3	27 April 2016	The Corrs, Meghan Trainor, Jarlath Regan, Go West, Tony Hadley, Uzeyer Novruzov and the cast of Aladdin: The Musical
4	4 May 2016	Billy Ocean, Ben Hanlin, Rachel Platten, Julian Ovenden, Gamarjobat and Paul Sinha
5	11 May 2016	Jack Savoretti, The Vamps, Kevin Tellez, Gabrielly Palacio, Al Murray, Beverley Knight, the cast of The Lion King and STOMP
6	18 May 2016	ABC, Nathan Sykes, Gregory Porter, Milos, the Sons Company Teeterboard and aeralists, Steve Williams and the cast of Guys and Dolls
7	1 June 2016	Craig David, Caro Emerald, Attraction, Nadiya Hussain, Alistair McGowan, Seann Walsh, Denis Lock, the cast of The Comedy About a Bank Robbery and the cast of Matilda the Musical
8	8 June 2016	Pixie Lott, Simply Red, Dane Baptiste, Attraction, Caravan Palace, Naked Lunch and the cast of Charlie and the Chocolate Factory: The Musical

===== 2017 =====
Episode	Original air date	Guest performers
1	19 April 2017	Emeli Sandé, Pete Firman, Steps, Ben Forster, the Chinese State Circus and The Techtonics
2	26 April 2017	James Blunt, Louisa Johnson, Jennifer Hudson, Adam Hess, Samurai Hayashi, Notorious and the cast of Half a Sixpence: The Musical
3	3 May 2017	Rick Astley, Lea Michele, Mark Watson, the Yamato drummers and the cast of 42nd Street
4	10 May 2017	Bananarama, Barry Manilow, the Chinese State Circus and Pippa Evans
5	17 May 2017	James Arthur, Prodijig, Tom Allen, TLC, Cor y Cwm, Les Dennis, Samantha Womack and the cast of The Addams Family
6	24 May 2017	Brian Conley, The Clairvoyants, Joe McElderry, Fever Formation, Elkie Brooks and the cast of Annie: The Musical
7	7 June 2017	Olly Murs and Louisa Johnson, Paul Zerdin, Imelda May, Blondie and the cast of Bat Out of Hell The Musical
8	14 June 2017	Clean Bandit, James More, James Acaster, The Noise Next Door, the cast of School of Rock and the cast of Les Misérables

== Archive status ==
Very few episodes survive of the earliest versions of this series, including the 1973–1974 revival, though surviving episodes of Sunday Night at the London Palladium were repeated by Talking Pictures TV in 2020 and 2021. (For a general overview of the potential reasons for this, see Wiping.)
