= Straight to the Heart (game show) =

1989 American dating game show

Straight to the Heart is an American game show that aired in first-run syndication from March 20 to September 8, 1989. The program was hosted by Michael Burger and co-hosted by Barbara Lee Alexander.

== Game format ==
Each episode features three men and three women looking for love, trying to find out which one of the three members of the opposite sex they are most compatible with.

Prior to the show, each team of men and women was asked three intimate questions about themselves. While on the air, three statements made by the team (one for each member) were revealed to the opposite sex. Each one decided which one pertains to him/her. Then the first team revealed who gave what statement. Each contestant got $50 for each opposite sex who said his/her statement. What makes this game different from other shows using money as a score is that money was not used as a score. It was all about how compatible they are with each other. The man and the woman who matched each other's answers the most win the game and become a couple.

=== Bonus round ===
The now-formed couple played a bonus round for more money or a trip. They each held letters "A" and "B"; they are what they would use to answer a series of either/or questions (all marked A or B). Also, the couple wore special heart-shaped blindfold glasses to prevent them from seeing each other's answers. Host Burger asked questions about vacationing on a trip they were going for, for the duration of 45 seconds. After each question was read, the couple each held up one of the two letters indicating the one s/he liked best. The studio audience will keep them informed of how many matches they have made. Each match was worth $50. If the couple matched five times before the 45 seconds ran out, the couple won a choice of either $500 in cash each or the trip.
