= The Midnight Special (TV program) =

American late-night musical variety television series

- Genre: Music variety show
- Created by: Burt Sugarman
- Presented by: Various guest hosts (1972–1975, 1976–1981); Helen Reddy (1975–1976)
- Announcer: Wolfman Jack
- Opening theme: "Midnight Special" performed by Johnny Rivers
- Ending theme: "I Am Woman" performed by Helen Reddy (1975–1976)
- Country of origin: United States
- Original language: English
- No. of episodes: 350

Production
- Executive producer: Burt Sugarman
- Producers: Stan Harris; Dick Ebersol
- Production location: NBC Studios in Burbank, CA
- Running time: 90 min
- Production company: Burt Sugarman Productions

Original release
- Network: NBC
- Release: August 19, 1972 – March 27, 1981

Related
- Tomorrow

The Midnight Special is an American late-night musical variety show originally broadcast on NBC from 1972 to 1981, created and produced by Burt Sugarman. It premiered as a TV special on August 19, 1972, hosted by John Denver and then began its run as a regular series from February 3, 1973, to March 27, 1981. The 90-minute program aired on Saturday mornings at 1 a.m. ET/PT after the Friday night edition of The Tonight Show Starring Johnny Carson.

Like its syndicated late-night cousin Don Kirshner's Rock Concert, the show typically featured guest hosts, except for a period from July 1975 through March 1976 when singer Helen Reddy served as the regular host. Wolfman Jack served as the announcer and frequent guest host. The program's theme song, a traditional folk song called "Midnight Special", was performed by Johnny Rivers.

== Format ==
The Midnight Special featured a collection of live performances, spanning the breadth of popular music of the 1970s, including pop, rock, folk, soul, dance (disco) and nostalgia/oldies acts along with stand-up comedy routines and sketch comedy troupes. Each new episode would be hosted, usually, by one of the artists performing during that program.

Occasional episodes would be shot on location, including two-part episodes shot in London and at Willie Nelson's 4th of July Picnic, and an episode shot at the Tulsa State Fair. The show presented The 1980 Floor Show, the last performance of David Bowie as Ziggy Stardust, on November 16, 1973, from specially-commissioned performances taped a month earlier at the Marquee Club in Soho, London. Select episodes carried themes, such as the "Million Sellers" (clip shows of previous episodes' performances with no host, played in lieu of straight reruns) and genre-specific nights such as "The Midnight Top 40 Special," "The Midnight Comedy Special," "The Midnight Special Country Edition" and the Don Cornelius-hosted "Midnight Disco Special."

== History ==
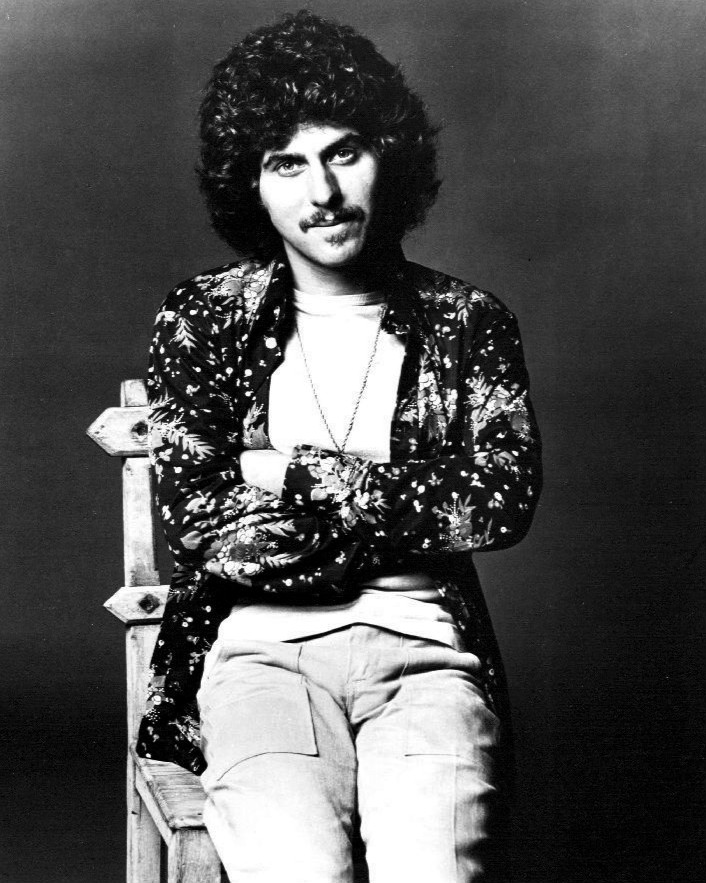
Johnny Rivers (pictured in 1975) performed the theme song for The Midnight Special, which is a rendition of Midnight Special (recorded in 1965), which the show is named after.

In 1972, producer Burt Sugarman pitched the program as a means for NBC to capitalize on a potential audience. "Our aim was to reach for the 18-33 age bracket, the young married and daters who attend concerts and movies but don't watch much television," Sugarman said. At the time, NBC's main late-night tentpole, The Tonight Show Starring Johnny Carson, generally limited its musical guests to those who played lighter music, as Carson believed that most television viewers at that hour were attempting to go to sleep and would not appreciate raucous music.

At the time, none of the Big Three television networks had programming on after 1:00 am Eastern time, as common practice by most stations was to sign off after the final program. Despite a lack of competition in that timeslot, NBC initially rejected the idea. The rejection led Sugarman to buy the air time for the premiere on his own as a brokered show, convincing Chevrolet to become the show's first sponsor. It premiered with ratings high enough for NBC to reconsider its decision, and the network subsequently bought the program. NBC also reasoned that the additional weekly hour and a half of programming would allow NBC to recoup some revenue lost as a result of the Public Health Cigarette Smoking Act, which banned the advertising of tobacco on television effective January 1, 1971.

The pilot for the series aired on August 19, 1972. It was presented as a 90-minute special encouraging young people to vote in the upcoming Presidential election. Nielsen ratings for the premiere episode were a success, with 4.4%, or approximately 5 million television sets "tuned in", and 32% of those watching TV during that time period were watching The Midnight Special. Several months later, on February 3, 1973, it premiered as a weekly series. Initially, it was scheduled to run 26 consecutive weeks. Within eight months of its premiere, The Midnight Special had proven that programming in the later time period was viable, and NBC would expand its programming in the time slot to five days a week with the addition of the talk show Tomorrow, hosted by Tom Snyder, the other four nights.

The Midnight Special's original time slot was on Saturdays from 1:00 to 2:30 a.m. in the Eastern and Pacific time zones (Midnight to 1:30 a.m. Central and Mountain). When The Tonight Show's run time was shortened from ninety to sixty minutes in September 1980, The Midnight Special was moved to 12:30 a.m. (ET/PT)/11:30 p.m. (CT/MT), maintaining its 90-minute run time.

In 1978, at the height of the disco craze, the set was changed to resemble a disco nightclub complete with a platform dance floor. Wolfman Jack stood behind an elevated DJ booth. By fall 1979, as the genre's popularity waned, the disco set was replaced. The show was canceled in March 1981 and remained on air in reruns until May 1981.

== Guest stars ==
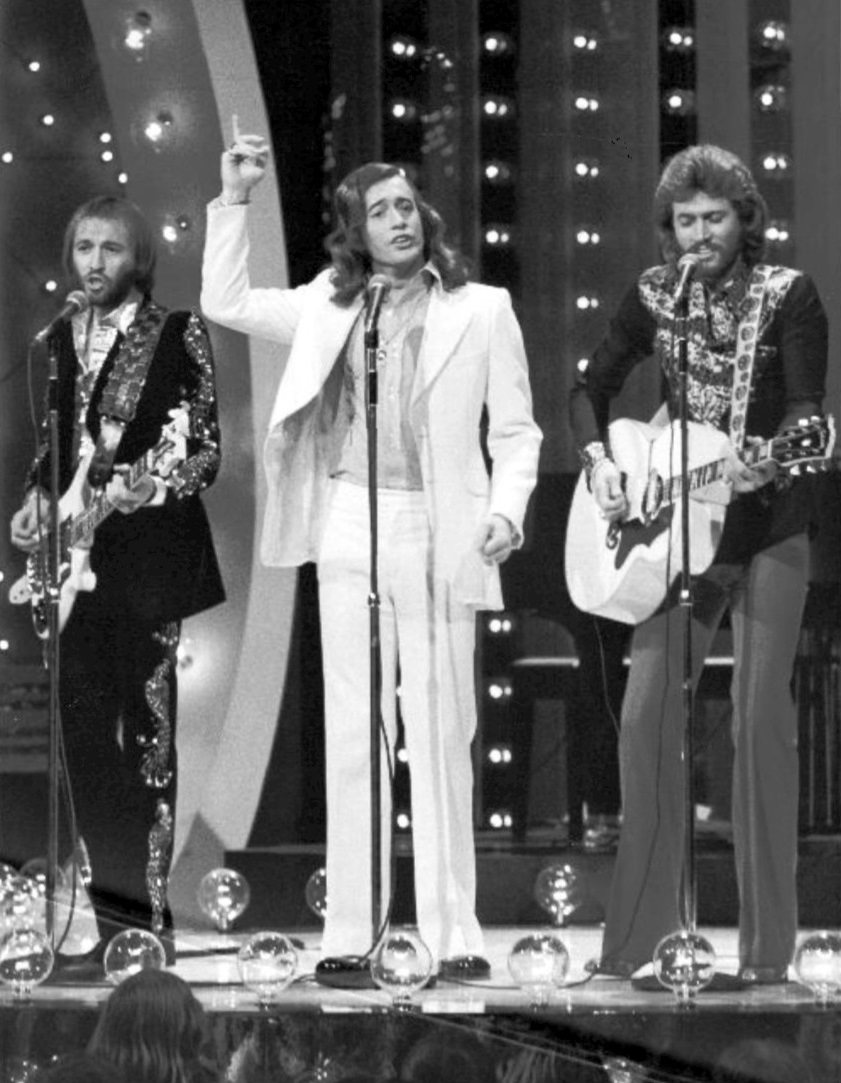
The Bee Gees performing on The Midnight Special, 1973.

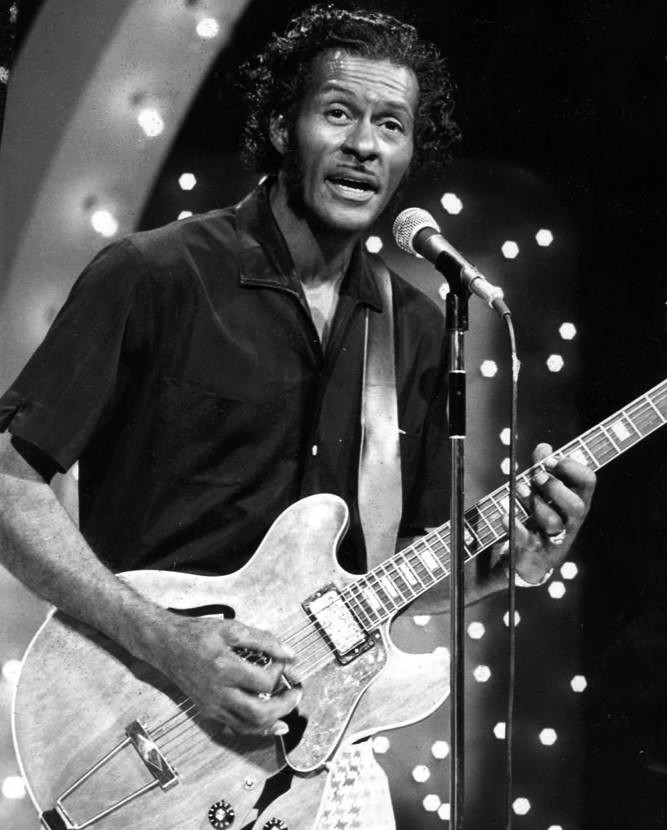
Chuck Berry as guest host, November 2, 1973.

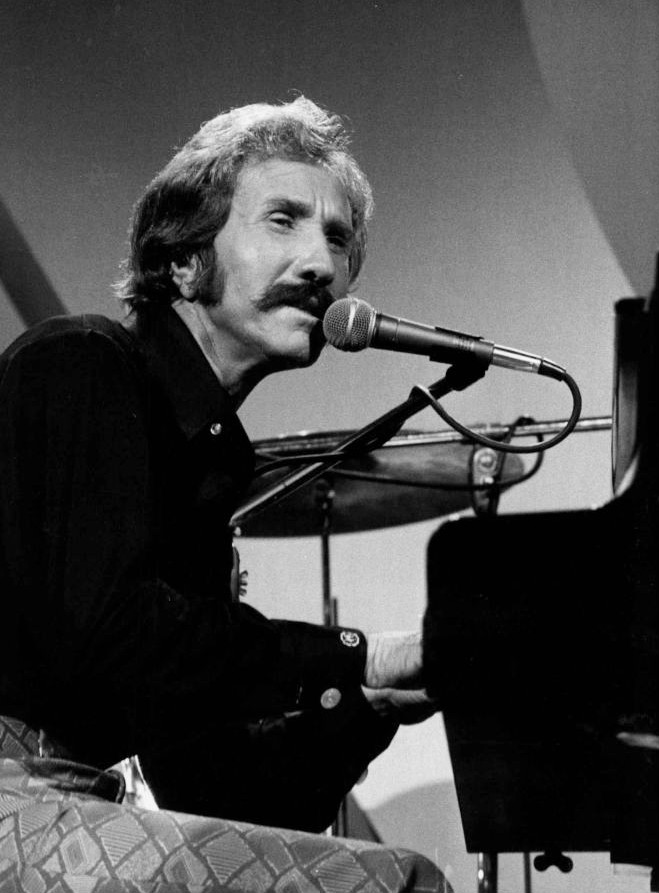
Marty Robbins performing on The Midnight Special, 1973.

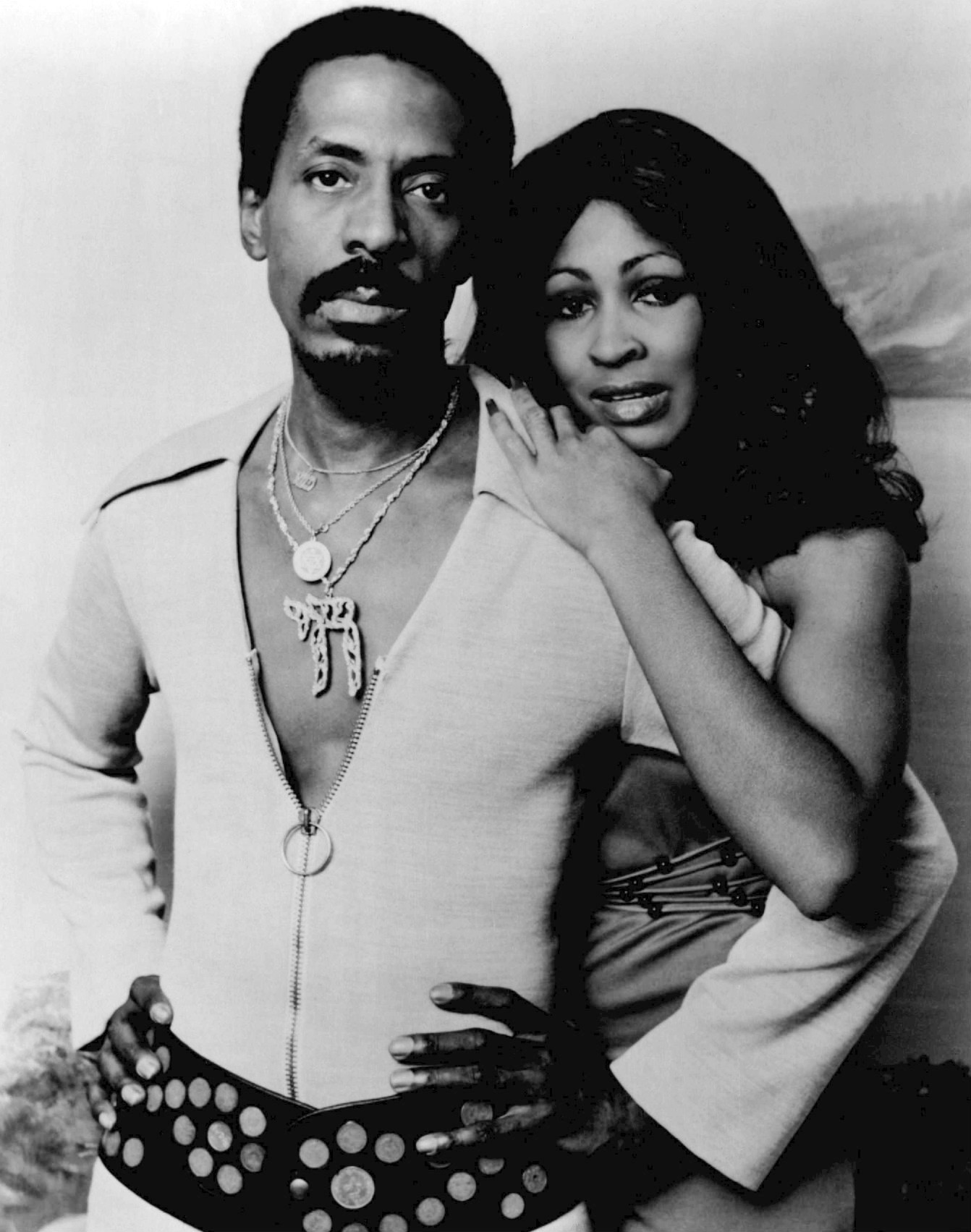
Ike & Tina Turner (pictured in 1973) hosted The Midnight Special in 1974.

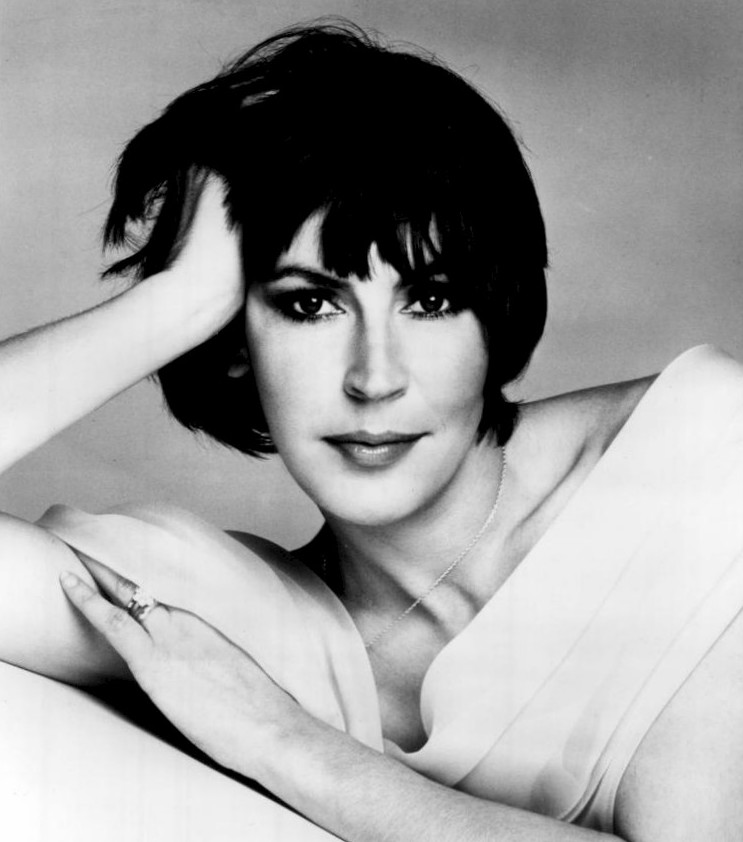
Helen Reddy in a promotional image for The Midnight Special, 1975.

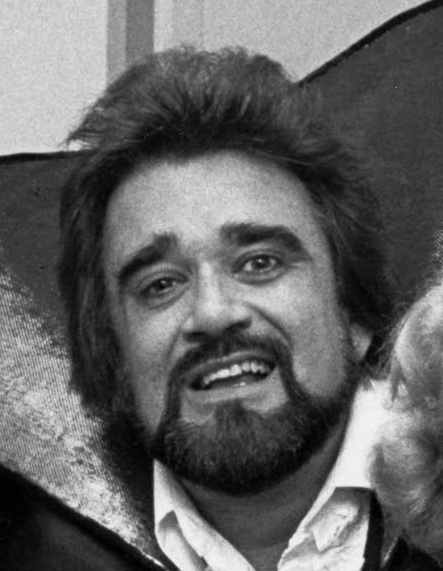
Announcer Wolfman Jack in 1979.

Some notable guest stars and hosts included:

- ABBA
- AC/DC
- Aerosmith
- America
- Lynn Anderson
- Hoyt Axton
- New Birth
- Badfinger
- Joan Baez
- The Bay City Rollers
- The Beach Boys
- The Bee Gees
- Jerry Bell
- Chuck Berry
- Bobby Bland
- Blondie
- David Bowie
- Bread
- Brooklyn Dreams
- James Brown
- John Denver
- The Cars
- The Chambers Brothers
- Ray Charles
- Curtis Mayfield
- Cheap Trick
- Lou Christie
- Petula Clark
- Alice Cooper
- Jim Croce
- Billy Crystal
- Bo Diddley
- The Doobie Brothers
- Earth, Wind & Fire
- Electric Light Orchestra
- Mama Cass Elliot
- Jose Feliciano
- Firefall
- Fleetwood Mac
- Flo & Eddie
- Focus
- Frankie Valli and the Four Seasons
- Peter Frampton
- Aretha Franklin
- Robert Fripp
- Marvin Gaye
- Genesis
- Andy Gibb
- Lesley Gore
- Gladys Knight & the Pips
- Golden Earring
- Goldstar
- Al Green
- The Guess Who
- Heart
- John Lee Hooker
- Janis Ian
- The Jackson 5
- Rick James
- Billy Joel
- Elton John
- Journey
- KC and the Sunshine Band
- Andy Kaufman
- B.B. King
- King Crimson
- The Kinks
- Kiss
- Kris Kristofferson
- Les Variations
- Jerry Lee Lewis
- The Lennon Sisters
- Gordon Lightfoot
- Little Feat
- Loggins & Messina
- Barry Manilow
- Steve Martin
- Seals and Crofts
- Eddie Money
- Van Morrison
- Anne Murray
- Randy Newman
- Olivia Newton-John
- The New York Dolls
- Ted Nugent
- The O'Jays
- Dolly Parton
- PFM (Premiata Forneria Marconi)
- Prince
- Richard Pryor
- Helen Reddy
- REO Speedwagon
- Minnie Riperton
- Linda Ronstadt
- Rare Earth
- Roxy Music
- Diana Ross
- T. Rex
- Rufus
- Todd Rundgren
- Neil Sedaka
- The Shadows of Knight
- Shirley and Lee - (nb * below)
- The Spinners
- The Sylvers
- Status Quo
- Steely Dan
- Steppenwolf
- Rod Stewart
- Sugarloaf
- Donna Summer
- Tom Petty and the Heartbreakers
- The Three Degrees
- Thin Lizzy
- Big Mama Thornton
- The Tubes
- Ike & Tina Turner Revue
- Village People
- War
- Jennifer Warnes
- Muddy Waters
- Weather Report
- Barry White
- Paul Williams
- Wishbone Ash
- Wolfman Jack
- Gary Wright
- XTC
- Wayne Fontana & The Mindbenders
  Comedian Billy Braver appeared nine times on the program, the most of any act.
  Shirley and Lee were introduced in 1974 singing 'Let the Good Times Roll', when actually 'Lee' wasn't on stage; 'Shirley' was singing with Steeltown Records Founder and Hollywood Shuffle actor Lou 'Ludie' Washington.

== Parody ==
The show was parodied with a song by comedian Ray Stevens in 1974 called "The Moonlight Special" playing Mr. Sheepdog (Wolfman Jack), whose guest included Mildred Queen and the Dipsticks (Gladys Knight & the Pips), Agnes Stoopa (Alice Cooper and his pet chicken (From the 1969 "Chicken incident" in Toronto)), and Jerry Joe Henly Jimmy (Jerry Lee Lewis).

== Cancellation ==
The show was successful from 1972 thru 1977, but in 1978 ratings began steadily declining. The series was finally canceled in 1981 by NBC at the request of Dick Ebersol as part of a deal for him to take over the then-ailing Saturday Night Live. Because there was no time for NBC to develop a new show from scratch in light of the urgent SNL situation, The Midnight Special was replaced by SCTV, a weekly Canadian sketch comedy series performed by members of the Toronto satellite of Chicago's The Second City improvisational troupe. That program, in turn, would later be replaced with another music show, Friday Night Videos, in 1983, also produced initially by Ebersol.

== Home video release ==
In 2006, a DVD collection entitled Burt Sugarman's Midnight Special was made available by Guthy-Renker through television and radio infomercials. In 2014, an 11-DVD collection entitled The Midnight Special was released by Star-Vista through standard retail channels.

In 2023, as a celebration of the series' 50th anniversary, full episodes of the series began rerunning on YouTube, with one archival episode released each week in order of production. The YouTube channel also carries select individual performances from the series and a subscription option to gain access to select episodes before their free release.

== See also ==
- List of late night network TV programs
- The Midnight Special (radio)
