= Shopping Spree =

US television game show in 1996 and 1997

- Genre: Game show
- Created by: Jay Wolpert
- Directed by: Randall Neece
- Presented by: Ron Pearson
- Narrated by: Burton Richardson
- Composer: Mark Northam
- Country of origin: United States
- Original language: English
- No. of seasons: 2
- No. of episodes: 130

Production
- Executive producer: Jay Wolpert
- Producer: Shannon Dobson
- Production locations: Hollywood Center Studios; Hollywood, California
- Running time: 30 minutes
- Production companies: Jay Wolpert Enterprises; MTM Enterprises

Original release
- Network: The Family Channel
- Release: September 30, 1996 – December 26, 1997

Shopping Spree is a game show that aired on the Family Channel (now Freeform) for two seasons from September 30, 1996, to December 26, 1997, with reruns airing until August 14, 1998. Two teams of two unacquainted players went on a shopping spree at six stores, each with four prizes, on a fictional street on stage. The object of the game was to match the desired prizes with visual clues given by the contestant in the quickest amount of time. The show was hosted by Ron Pearson, announced by Burton Richardson and produced by Jay Wolpert Enterprises and MTM Enterprises.

In 1996, it was one of four new weekday game shows on the Family Channel, along with Shop 'til You Drop, Wait Till You Have Kids, and Small Talk.

== Main Game ==
Prior to the show, one contestant from each team was shown the six stores, and from each store chose one prize they would like to have. At the beginning of the round, one player was isolated while the other stood on a pedestal in the "town square" at center stage wearing various objects on his/her body that would give clues to their partner about the prizes he/she selected. The player and host Pearson went over the items the contestant was wearing.

At that point, a randomly selected member of the studio audience helped to reveal the six stores for that day's show. This audience member was always referred to as "Denise DuJour" or "Dennis DuJour", depending on their gender. After the prizes and stores were revealed, the contestant was asked to strike a pose, after which the contestant's partner was brought out. The partner was given 20 seconds to analyze the items on the posing contestant. When the 20 seconds expired, the contestant was released from his/her pose and met his/her partner for the first time. However, if the dressed contestant made a gesture or other action that led to a hint, that team was assessed a 10-second penalty.

On Pearson's cue, the partner ran to the first store, chose one of the four prizes and ran back with it to show what prize he/she chose. If the prize the partner chose matched the first contestant's choice, a bell rang, the partner put the prize in the over-sized shopping bag and moved on to the next store. If the partner was wrong, a buzzer sounded, he/she had to listen to a clue posed by Pearson, then returned to that store and chose another prize. The first team established a time for the second team to beat, and the clock stopped after all six stores were completed.

After a commercial break, the second team attempted to beat the first team's time in the manner described. The runner on the winning team received a gift certificate for his/her own $500 shopping spree, and their partner kept the prizes they chose. In addition, the winning team advanced to the Birthday Party.

In season two, if the runner on the team made it through all six stores without making a mistake, they won a $500 bonus.

== Bonus round ==
In the bonus round, titled "the Birthday Party", the contestants chose from among a selection of "gifts" for which celebrities might have a particular use. The game was played for a vacation package and a cash prize.

=== Double Up Derby ===
Beginning halfway through the first season, the winning team played a game called "Denise/Dennis DuJour's Double Up Derby" to determine how much money they would play for at the Birthday Party. Before the show, that day's Denise/Dennis selected a prize from one of the six stores. The team was given a brief description of Denise/Dennis, and was then asked to guess which prize they believe Denise/Dennis had chosen. If the team guessed correctly, Denise/Dennis won that chosen prize and the team played for $2,000 in addition to a vacation package at the Birthday Party. If they were unsuccessful, the team played for $1,000 and the package. Regardless of the outcome, Denise/Dennis received a $100 salary for the day.

=== Birthday Party ===
A contestant sliding a gift toward a celebrity.

After the team listened to a description of the potential bonus prize, the three pieces of the set rotated 180 degrees to reveal the Birthday Party. The left panel revealed the playing area, the center piece held a large representation of a birthday cake, and the rightmost panel held a wall of 12 to 14 items labeled the "Birthday Board".

One team member shopped for gifts and the other had to wrap and deliver them to the celebrities. Pearson showed the contestants and the home audience each item on the Birthday Board. The game began with a caricature of a famous celebrity (real or fictional, past or present) appearing at the end of a table. The shopper took down an item from the board that he/she thought was connected to the celebrity in some way (a chef's hat would be connected to Wolfgang Puck) and threw it to the wrapper. The wrapper then placed it in the box and slid it down the table to the celebrity. If the team was correct, the gift was accepted and another celebrity appeared. If not, the celebrity "rejected" the gift and pushed it back. Teams could pass and go back to that celebrity if there was any time remaining. Each correct gift was worth $100, and getting all seven gifts within 75 seconds awarded each team member a vacation package and $1,000 ($2,000 if the team won the Double Up Derby).

During the second season, the shopper could not cross a line on the floor when throwing gifts to the wrapper. If this occurred, a five-second penalty was assessed.
