= Baby Races =

- Genre: Game show
- Written by: Joseph Neustein
- Directed by: George Choderker
- Presented by: Fred Travalena
- Narrated by: Gene Wood
- Country of origin: United States
- No. of episodes: 26

Production
- Executive producer: Robert Sherman
- Running time: 30 minutes
- Production companies: Robert Sherman Productions; Family Productions

Original release
- Network: The Family Channel
- Release: September 12, 1993 – March 6, 1994

Baby Races is an American game show that aired on the Family Channel from September 12, 1993, to March 6, 1994. After the last episode aired, the show went into reruns until August 27, 1994. It was hosted by Fred Travalena, and the announcer was Gene Wood. The executive producer was Robert Sherman. It was also filmed at the Disney-MGM Studios at Walt Disney World in Florida (now Disney's Hollywood Studios).

== Gameplay ==
The contestants on the show were young children who came with their parents to play in a series of seven events. Two teams play on each show.

=== Events ===
Some of the events were:

- Sandbox Golf - the children play miniature golf. They try to put a golf ball into a hole using miniature golf clubs.
- Cow Catcher - the children ride on their parents' back and try to round up some toy cows and place them in a corral.
- Paint by Numbers - the children throw number shaped sponges dipped in paint at their parents.
- Sit On It - The parents make sandcastle towers using buckets, and the children demolish the towers by, as the name suggests, sitting on them.
- Spill the Beans - the children carry plates of beans on their heads and dump the beans in a bowl held by one of their parents. At the end of the round, the bowl is placed on a scale to determine the score, with the result always rounded up to the next whole number.
- Wacky Woodpecker - the children, wearing a cone-shaped paper "beak," used the beak to pick additional beaks out of two on-stage "trees."
- Worm Toss - the children toss worms one at a time across a mat (representing water) into oversized pants worn by their parents.
- Anteater Antics - the children tried to pick up magnetic ants using a magnetic beak.
- Thermometer Ball - the parents picked up their children, lifting them up and down so that the children could "slam dunk" small basketballs into a large tube.

Games were played in a 45-second time limit (with the exception that the first game, the only one where the children competed directly, sometimes lasted for 30 seconds), and each item in each game was worth one point (occasionally two), with each kid's last game being played for two points an item.

=== The toy store ===
At the end of the final event, a whistle sounded which indicated that the game was over, and the children and parents went over to a "toy store" in front of a video wall. Each child received a certificate showing his or her total score, and selected a prize from a pile of toys on a rotating platform. In addition, each child received a $300 gift certificate and participating adults also received prizes.

== Critical reception ==
Evan Levine of the Houston Chronicle called the show "mostly silly." Writing for the Chicago Tribune, criticized Travalena's hosting style as "lame" but thought that some of the stunts were "relatively creative."
