= Michael Burger =

American television personality, actor and comedian (born 1957)

- Born: June 10, 1957 (age 69); Long Beach, California, U.S.
- Occupations: Actor, comedian, game show host, talk show host
- Years active: 1980–present

Michael Burger (born June 10, 1957) is an American actor, comedian, game show host and television presenter.

== Game shows ==
Burger was hired by Reg Grundy Productions to host a pilot for a show called Matchmates in 1985. The show, which was taped at NBC's Burbank Studios and intended to air on the network's daytime schedule, did not sell.

Two years later, Burger also hosted another Grundy pilot called Late Night Lotto in 1987, which also did not sell.

Approximately four years later, in March 1989, Burger was picked to host Straight to the Heart, an adult-themed dating game show that ran in syndication with co-host (and soap opera actress) Barbara Lee Alexander (now Barbara Niven) until September 1989. Then in September 1991, he was picked to host Personals, another adult-themed dating game show that ran on CBS' late night schedule until December 1992. Burger also hosted Man O' Man based on a German game show format of the same name as a one-hour special for UPN in 1995.

In 1996, Burger was called upon to replace Ray Combs as the host of The Family Channel's Family Challenge (renamed The New Family Challenge), a position that became open after Combs' departure from the series and (later) suicide. Following the cancellation of that series in 1997, Burger was hired to host a new version of Match Game, which premiered in 1998 and ran for one season.

Burger later had a stint hosting the live stage show The Price Is Right Live! and also served as the play-by-play commentator on the short-lived series Iron Chef USA.

In 2008, Burger hosted the unsold pilot based on the online single and multi-player game that combined elements of slots and bingo called Slingo.

== Other shows ==
In 1994, Burger and Maty Monfort were hired by ABC to host a new daytime series to replace their long running program The Home Show. Premiering on April 11, 1994, Mike and Maty aired for just over two years and ended on June 7, 1996. After the show's cancellation, Burger replaced Chuck Woolery as Cristina Ferrare's co-host on The Home and Family Show on the Family Channel and stayed on until its 1998 cancellation. Since then, he's acted in other television shows such as Less than Perfect, 8 Simple Rules, Shasta McNasty, and American Dreams.

Burger was the warmup comedian for the original TV Land sitcom Hot in Cleveland until its series finale in 2015.
