= Anything You Can Do (game show) =

Canadian television game show

- Directed by: Lorne Freed
- Presented by: Gene Wood; Don Harron
- Announcer: Bill Luxton
- Country of origin: Canada
- Original language: English
- No. of seasons: 3

Production
- Executive producer: Don Reid
- Producers: Lorne Freed; Alan J. Shalleck
- Running time: 30 minutes
- Production company: Don Reid Productions

Original release
- Network: CTV (Canada); Syndicated (US)
- Release: September 13, 1971 – September 1974

Anything You Can Do is a Canadian stunt-based game show that aired on that country's CTV network and in syndication in the United States from 1971 to 1974. The host in the show's first season was Gene Wood, who at the time was also the announcer on Beat the Clock originally hosted by Jack Narz from 1970 to 1972 then later Wood himself and announced by Nick Hollinrake from 1972 to 1974. For the last two seasons, Don Harron was the host. Bill Luxton was the announcer for the series, which was taped at the studios of CJOH-TV in Ottawa, Ontario.

The game was billed as a "battle of the sexes" and was played by two teams of three, men against women.

The shows' title is a reference to a 1946 song called Anything You Can Do (I Can Do Better) from the classic Broadway musical Annie Get Your Gun (composed by Irving Berlin) as a battling duet where one male singer and one female singer try to outdo each other in increasingly complex task.

== Rules ==
Two teams of three, men against women, competed. Center stage was a board containing the names of occupations that are (or were, at the time) generally performed by men, and occupations generally performed by women. The men picked from the women's side of the board; the women, from the men's. The object was to complete a stunt related to the chosen occupation in 90 seconds or less. The time required to complete the stunt was added to the times for completing previous stunts; the team with the least total time at the end of the show won and received prizes, while the losing team received prizes of lesser value.

There was also a "brain game" about midway through the show; the teams would have to complete some activity such as spelling or unscrambling a word, reciting a tongue twister, etc. The time taken to complete the task was added to the team's overall time.

== Schedule ==
In Canada, the series aired as a daily daytime show as well as a weekly nighttime show. Some U.S. stations aired it daily while others only showed it once a week.

== Reruns ==
After a 56 year absence, reruns of the show began on August 31, 2026 airing every morning on GameTV.
