= Don Arrol =

Scottish comedian

- Born: Donald Angus Campbell; 8 November 1927; Glasgow, Scotland
- Died: 13 May 1967 (aged 39); London, England
- Occupations: Comedian, entertainer, compere

Donald Angus Campbell (8 November 1927–13 May 1967), known professionally as Don Arrol, was a Scottish comedian and television variety show entertainer.

== Life and career ==
He was born in Glasgow, the son of a part-time comedian in local clubs. He started performing when in his teens, first appearing in Blackpool in 1946 as one half of a double act with comedian Ralph "Dump" Harris, performing Laurel and Hardy sketches. He appeared regularly in pantomimes and shows in Scotland and throughout Britain, and in the early 1950s developed a double act with another comedian, Norman Meadows. By the late 1950s he was working as a solo comedian. According to Meadows, Arrol "...often wore an oversized raincoat with squared shoulders. As he reached centre stage, he somehow 'stepped out' of it, revealing the interior. The coat's 'walls' contained an assortment of pots, pans, cutlery, bone china and the bric a brac you'd expect to find in a suburban semi....it was his house, during the time he took to perform his stage routine."

By 1960 he had begun to make occasional radio appearances, as well as compering tours by pop musicians such as Conway Twitty and Adam Faith. After appearing in shows in Blackpool and Newquay, but while still little-known nationally, he was recruited by Val Parnell to host the 1960/61 season of the popular television show Sunday Night at the London Palladium, replacing at short notice Bruce Forsyth who was ill with a suspected duodenal ulcer. Forsyth returned to the show for later seasons, but Arrol remained active in television work during the 1960s, hosting shows including Thank Your Lucky Stars, The Black and White Minstrel Show and the British edition of Candid Camera.

Arrol's first wife died in a car crash in 1961; he later remarried. He died, aged 39, from a heart attack in 1967, during a theatre season of the Black and White Minstrel Show in London.
