= Family Challenge =

American game show

- Logo of The New Family Challenge (1996–1997).
- Created by: Dave Thomas; Woody Fraser
- Directed by: Bob Loudin (1995–1996); Bob Levy (1996–1997)
- Presented by: Ray Combs; Michael Burger
- Announcer: Gene Wood; Charlie Glaize
- Theme music composer: Wendy DeAugustine
- Country of origin: United States
- No. of seasons: 2
- No. of episodes: 144

Production
- Executive producers: Dave Thomas; Woody Fraser; David M. Greenfield (1995–1996)
- Producers: Dave Garrison; David M. Greenfield (1995–1996); Damian Sullivan (1996–1997)
- Production locations: Glendale Studios, Glendale, California (1995-1996); Universal Studios Hollywood (1996–97)
- Running time: 60 minutes
- Production companies: MTM Enterprises; Woody Fraser Enterprises; Maple Palm Productions

Original release
- Network: The Family Channel
- Release: October 2, 1995 – September 7, 1997

Family Challenge is an American game show that aired on The Family Channel from October 2, 1995 to September 7, 1997, lasting for two seasons. Reruns aired on Game Show Network from April 3 to September 25, 1999.

The show was created by comedian Dave Thomas and veteran television producer Woody Fraser, and was originally produced as a pilot for ABC. Thomas and Fraser were executive producers on the show for its entire run.

== Personnel ==
=== Ray Combs and Gene Wood ===
The first season of Family Challenge was hosted by Ray Combs, with Gene Wood serving as announcer. Combs was in the midst of a series of physical and emotional injuries that resulted in a significantly large accumulation of debt, foreclosures, chronic pain, and a divorce at the time he hosted Family Challenge, and the new series had given Combs a renewed sense of optimism about his career prospects after his dismissal from Family Feud, the show he had hosted from 1988 to 1994. After the first season was completed, Combs eventually made two attempts at suicide. The latter of the two attempts was successful, as Combs hanged himself in a closet at a Glendale, California hospital on June 2, 1996.

During the final two weeks of season 1, Gene Wood was ill and Randy West took over as announcer. Out of respect for Ray Combs and his family, Wood decided not to return for season 2 (the pair had also worked together on Feud).

=== Michael Burger and Charlie Glaize ===
When the show returned for a second season, the name was changed to The New Family Challenge. Michael Burger, who had just joined The Family Channel as a co-host for Home & Family after Chuck Woolery left the show, took over for Combs as host; voice actor Charlie Glaize replaced Wood as the show's announcer.

== Premise ==
Two teams of six family members competed. Each team usually consisted of two adults and four children (commonly the parents' own children, plus nieces and/or nephews). Usually six stunts were played, and each stunt was worth a varying number of points. The stunts varied in each show; the following are a few stunts used on the show during the first season.

=== Stunts ===
- Tug of war: All six members of the first team competed against American Gladiator Hawk, with a tank full of green "gunk" set up at the center point. The team won one point for each second they could stay up. They won 60 points if they stayed up for 30 seconds or pulled Hawk into the gunk. This process would be repeated for the second team.
- Backwards relay race: Three members of each team competed. The first team started at a table with various items on it. The first teammate ran backwards to a board and read a short message written backwards on it, which corresponded to an item on the table. He then ran backwards to the starting position and do something with the item. (For example, "This Icy Sensation Causes A Gyration" means they must pour a pitcher of water down their pants, and "Simple Simon Met A Pie Man" means they must smosh a pie into their face.) This continued until all three teammates had a chance to do two things. After the first family finished, the second family was brought out of isolation to try to beat their time. The family who could do it in the fastest time won 100 points.
- Kissing contest: One event involved three doors and one member of each team. The player on the first team would pick a door, behind which was a live animal, which the contestant would have to kiss on the lips. If the player kept contact with it for 5 seconds, that family won 10 points. The player on the second team then picked a second door, and had to kiss whatever was behind it. After this, each player could elect to kiss whatever was behind the unpicked door, but had to do it blindfolded for 10 seconds. Doing this won 20 points.
- Pearl diving: Two members of each team had two minutes to wade in a giant tank of gunk looking for large balls that represented pearls. Each white "pearl" collected won 10 points, and each black "pearl" won 50.
- Family Quiz: In a manner similar to The Newlywed Game, one family member from each team is asked questions about one of their teammates (e.g. parents answering questions about one of their kids). Each correct answer is worth 10 points, while each incorrect answer results in a messy penalty for the player answering the questions, like a pie in the face.
- Pie Device Relay: Teams played individually. One family member had to run around to several pie devices where their teammates were placed. First, the runner must run to the Pie Pendulum, where they must lower the 1st family member into a large pie. Next, they run to the Pie Roulette to launch a pie at the next teammate, usually the father. Then, they run to the Pie Guillotine to drop a pie on the next teammate, then launch another pie from the Pie Roulette. Afterward, they must pop a gunk balloon above their next teammate, usually the mother, then it's back to the Pie Roulette to launch another pie. Next, they run to the Pie Cannon to launch whipped cream at the next teammate, returning to the Pie Roulette for one last pie. Afterward, the runner must go up the stairs and down the slide into the Gunk Tank. The runner then must wade through the Gunk Tank, where they must put one last pie in their face to stop the clock. Fastest time won.

Both the Pie Pendulum and Pie Roulette were previously used on the Nickelodeon game show What Would You Do?, which was also created by Woody Fraser.

At the end of the final event, the team with the most points was the winner. That team won two prizes (such as a new living room group and a ceiling fan), and a trophy called "The Family Challenge Championship Cup" and during the closing credits, Gene Wood announced that all of the food used on the show was no longer edible.

== Season two changes ==
Besides the new host and announcer, the show was re-titled The New Family Challenge and given a new set. It was taped at Universal Studios Hollywood. The game was played the same as before, except that only four stunts were played. Burger also played games with the audience, filling the time previously used for the fifth and sixth stunt. Each team this season had 5 players, usually 2 adults and 3 children, and the team colors changed every episode whereas in Season 1 it was always red team versus blue team.

Towards the end of the run, all Friday shows consisted solely of audience participation games.

The second season premiere was dedicated to the memory of Ray Combs, as acknowledged during the credits.
