= Ray Combs =

American game show host (1956–1996)

- Combs in a publicity photo for Family Feud in 1988
- Born: Raymond Neil Combs Jr. April 3, 1956; Hamilton, Ohio, U.S.
- Died: June 2, 1996 (aged 40); Glendale, California, U.S.
- Occupations: Stand-up comedian; actor; game show host
- Spouse: Debbie Combs (m. 1977; sep. 1995)
- Children: 6

Comedy career
- Years active: 1979–1996
- Medium: Stand-up; film; television
- Genres: Improvisational comedy; observational comedy

Raymond Neil Combs Jr. (April 3, 1956 – June 2, 1996) was an American stand-up comedian, actor, and game show host. He began his professional career in the late 1970s. His popularity on the stand-up circuit led to him being signed as the second host of the game show Family Feud in its second run and first revival. The show aired on CBS from 1988 to 1993 and was in syndication from 1988 to 1994. From 1995 to 1996, Combs hosted another game show, Family Challenge.

== Early life ==
Raymond Neil Combs Jr. was born in Hamilton, Ohio, on April 3, 1956. He graduated in 1974 from Garfield High School, where he was an actor, senior class president, and Boys State delegate. He declined a nomination to the United States Military Academy and served as a missionary from the Church of Jesus Christ of Latter-day Saints for two years in Arizona.

== Career ==
Combs began performing comedy at Cincinnati's Red Dog Saloon, where he developed his best-known shtick of audience sing-alongs of sitcom theme songs. In 1979, Combs sent a letter to David Letterman, asking for advice; Letterman encouraged him to continue in comedy. In 1982, convinced that he was better than the comedians whose acts he saw on The Tonight Show, Combs left his job as an Indianapolis furniture salesman and moved with his family to Los Angeles. He did well in a competition with more than 200 other young comedians, and began doing audience warm-ups for NBC sitcoms such as The Golden Girls, The Facts of Life and Amen. He became so popular that other sitcoms changed their production schedules just so they could have him warm up their audiences. Johnny Carson heard the audience's laughter and then invited Combs to perform on The Tonight Show in October 1986; the audience gave him a standing ovation.

In 1985, he appeared on an episode of The Facts of Life as a background character. Around this time, he also guest-starred on an episode of The Golden Girls. In 1987, he appeared as a celebrity panelist on the John Davidson version of Hollywood Squares, and had a small role in the comedy film Overboard starring Kurt Russell and Goldie Hawn (he was the local cop in the beginning hospital sequence).

=== Family Feud ===
In 1988, game-show producers Mark Goodson and Howard Felsher gave Combs a seven-year contract to host a new version of Family Feud. The program premiered on July 4, 1988, on CBS's daytime lineup, and a syndicated version was launched on September 19. According to Family Feud announcer Gene Wood, Combs also toured extensively around the United States to promote the show, and made guest appearances on Card Sharks and The Price Is Right to discuss the new version of Family Feud with respective hosts Bob Eubanks and Bob Barker. While most stations were ready to carry the new Family Feud, Combs was publicly "very, very embarrassed" by one station who did not choose to carry the daytime version of show: then-CBS affiliate KSL in Salt Lake City, a station owned by Bonneville International Corporation (Note: Bonneville International Corporation is a media and broadcasting company, wholly owned by the Church of Jesus Christ of Latter-day Saints (LDS Church) through its for-profit arm, Deseret Management Corporation.) elected to air community information in its place; KSL's competitor, then-NBC affiliate KUTV, picked up the syndicated version of Family Feud in September 1988. On June 29, 1992, CBS expanded the daytime show from 30 minutes to one hour. A new "Bullseye" round was added and the show was retitled Family Feud Challenge. On September 14, 1992, the Bullseye round was integrated into the syndicated run, which remained 30 minutes in length, but was renamed as New Family Feud. Combs was one of the most seen hosts on television during the 1992–93 season, with an hour and a half of Family Feud airing five days a week.

While Combs enjoyed hosting Family Feud, he grew increasingly frustrated by the rigid formula of the show. He pressured his agent to find new opportunities for him in acting and comedy.

Midway through the 1992–93 season, ratings for the show began to plummet. CBS canceled the daytime version in early 1993, with the final new episode airing March 26 (reruns aired through September 10), as many CBS affiliates had dropped the show entirely by that time. The syndicated version was also on the verge of cancellation (as many stations had also dropped that or moved it into overnight time slots). Jonathan Goodson, who had become chairman of Mark Goodson Productions after the death of his father, Mark Goodson, in 1992, decided to replace Combs with original host Richard Dawson in the hopes of spiking ratings (Dawson's return season initially drew good ratings, but was unable to sustain this strength long-term, and Family Feud's second incarnation ended after the 1994–95 season). By all accounts, Combs was hurt by his dismissal from the show.

=== Other appearances ===
Combs also made an appearance for the World Wrestling Federation (WWF) as a guest ring announcer at WrestleMania VIII, where he amused the capacity crowd at Indianapolis' Hoosier Dome by lashing into the team of the Nasty Boys, The Mountie, and Repo Man with various scathing insults before being ultimately chased out of the ring. He later served as a guest commentator alongside Vince McMahon and Bobby Heenan at Survivor Series 1993 in a match of the Hart Family against Shawn Michaels and his Knights.

In addition to these two appearances, he appeared in various WWF/WBF celebrity editions of Family Feud. Heenan and Combs also struck up a friendship, which Heenan recounted in his autobiography, noting that he believed Combs felt pigeonholed by being a game-show host.

Combs portrayed himself in episodes of In Living Color and 227 in Family Feud sketches and made an appearance on the TNN television series The Statler Brothers Show, where he did a stand-up comedy routine. In October 1993, a Family Feud video game featuring Combs' likeness was released for both the Super NES and the Sega Genesis.

Combs was the master of ceremonies of the annual StarGaze charity events produced by Jim Kelly from 1993 to 1995.

== Personal life ==
In July 1994, Combs was involved in a serious car accident along the SR 134 portion of the Ventura Freeway. He sustained an injury in one of his spinal discs, leaving him in severe and continuous pain. Combs also struggled with financial problems after the failure of two of his comedy clubs (Caddy Combs and the Cincinnati Comedy Connection) and his home in Hamilton, Ohio, went into foreclosure. In September 1995, he separated from Debbie, his wife of 18 years (with whom he had six children). The couple attempted to reconcile, but later refiled for divorce. It was never finalized.

Combs made several attempts to resurrect his television career. He taped a pilot for a talk show called The Ray Combs Show, but it was ultimately not picked up. Combs also hosted Family Challenge on The Family Channel from 1995 to 1996, and made a number of appearances on the Game Show Network.

== Death ==
On June 1, 1996, police were called to Combs' home at 1318 Sonora Avenue in Glendale, California, over reports of a disturbance. Combs had reportedly destroyed most of the inside of his house, and had also been banging his head against the walls, though Combs later told the police that he fell in the jacuzzi. Shortly after police arrived, Combs' estranged wife Debbie arrived and informed them that Combs was suicidal and had spent the previous week in the hospital for a suicide attempt. He was taken by police to Glendale Adventist Medical Center, where he was assessed by a medical doctor and placed on a 72-hour psychiatric observation hold. On June 2, at around 4:10 a.m., hospital personnel discovered Combs hanging by his bed sheets in the closet of his room. He was taken to the emergency room, where he was pronounced dead, aged 40. His death was ruled a suicide.

On June 7, 1996, Combs' funeral was held at the Church of Jesus Christ of Latter-day Saints in Glendale. His remains were flown back to his hometown of Hamilton, Ohio, where he was interred at the Greenwood Cemetery. His Family Feud and Family Challenge announcer Gene Wood (who was a very close friend of Combs) attended the funeral and delivered a eulogy. On Thanksgiving 1996, Game Show Network aired a special Family Feud marathon hosted by Wood and Richard Dawson with Wood closing the marathon with an emotional tribute to Combs.

== Filmography ==
=== Film ===
Year	Title	Role	Notes
1987	Overboard	Cop at Hospital	
1995	Vampire in Brooklyn	Game show host	Alternative title: Wes Craven's Vampire in Brooklyn

=== Television ===
Year	Title	Role	Notes
1985	The Facts of Life	Technician	Episode: "Doo-Wah"
1986	You Again?	Various roles	3 episodes
1987	The Golden Girls	Bob Henderson	Episode: "And Then There Was One"
1988	Amen	Harold Buckner	2 episodes
1988	227	Himself	Episode: "And the Survey Says..."
1988–1994	Family Feud	Host	
1989	Miss Hollywood Talent Search	Host	
1992	WrestleMania VIII	Himself	
1992	The Larry Sanders Show	Himself	Episode: "Hey Now"
1993	In Living Color	Himself	Episode: "Forever Silky"
1993	Survivor Series	Himself	
1995–1996	Family Challenge	Host	

== Notes ==
Media offices
Preceded by Richard Dawson	Host of Family Feud; 1988–1994	Succeeded by Richard Dawson
