= Whew! =

American game show

- Created by: Jay Wolpert
- Directed by: Bill Carruthers; Chris Darley; Tom Trbovich
- Presented by: Tom Kennedy
- Announcer: Rod Roddy
- Theme music composer: Alan Thicke
- Country of origin: United States
- No. of episodes: 273

Production
- Executive producers: Bud Austin; Burt Sugarman
- Producer: Jay Wolpert
- Production locations: CBS Television City; Hollywood, California
- Running time: Approx. 25 minutes (with commercials)
- Production companies: The Bud Austin Company; Jay Wolpert Productions; Burt Sugarman Inc.

Original release
- Network: CBS
- Release: April 23, 1979 – May 30, 1980

Whew! is an American television game show that aired on CBS from April 23, 1979, until May 30, 1980. Contestants compete to correct "bloopers," factual statements in which one word has been changed, on a game board to win cash.

The game was created by Jay Wolpert, with Tom Kennedy as host and Rod Roddy as announcer. Production was initially credited to the Bud Austin Company, then later changed to Jay Wolpert Productions in association with Burt Sugarman Inc. The animated opening sequence, featuring a woman evading an array of villains, was produced by Hanna-Barbera. In September 2021, TV network Buzzr began reruns of Whew!

== Gameplay ==
=== Main game ===
The main game is played on a game board between two contestants. One is the "charger", attempting to reach the top of the game board, and the other is the "blocker", who attempts to prevent the charger from reaching the top.

The gameboard consists of five rows of five squares each, with values from $10 to $50 in $10 increments, and a sixth level of three squares with values of $200, $350, and $500. Levels are numbered from the bottom of the board, working upward. Two contestants (or during the later half of the run, two teams of a celebrity and a civilian) are told the categories for the first two rounds of play at the start of the match. The current challenger (or the winner of a coin toss, if there is no returning champion) decides whether to play as the charger or the blocker for the first round, and the champion takes the other role. The charger is led offstage to a soundproof booth, and the blocker then places six blocks on the board. Up to three blocks can be placed on any of the first five levels, and no more than one on the sixth.

The charger is brought back onstage and given 60 seconds to advance through all six levels by correcting "bloopers," or factual statements in which one word is changed. The charger starts on level one by choosing one of its squares. If a blooper is hidden there, it is revealed on that space's trilon and read out by Kennedy. The incorrect word is marked with an underline, and is the only part that the charger needed to correct. (Example: "The B&O was the first American passenger smell," with "railroad" as the correct answer.) A correct answer adds the value to the charger's score for the match and allows them to move to the next level, while a miss or failure to respond within three seconds requires them to choose another square. Uncovering a block adds the amount to the blocker's score and incurs a five-second penalty before the charger can continue. If the charger reveals all the squares on a level without a correct answer, the level is "exhausted" and the charger is allowed to advance.

If the charger believes that they are running short on time, and has not yet reached level six, they can call a "Longshot." The clock is stopped, the charger immediately advances to level six, and the blocker hides one secret block on that level in addition to the one that may have already been placed there. The charger then selects one square and attempts to correct its blooper if one is hidden there. The charger wins by either clearing all six levels or successfully completing a Longshot. If the charger runs out of time, or either hits a block or fails to correct a blooper after calling a Longshot, the blocker wins the round.

The contestants trade roles for the second round; if a third one is needed, Kennedy announces its category at that time and the champion decides who will take which role.

The first contestant to win two rounds wins all the money they have accumulated, and advances to the Gauntlet of Villains bonus round. The runner-up receives consolation prizes.

=== The Gauntlet of Villains ===
The contestant stands at the beginning of a path lined with ten cardboard caricatures of stereotypical villains, each with one arm raised as a barrier. They have 60 seconds, plus one extra second for every $100 earned in the main game, to reach the end of the path by correcting bloopers as they are read out by the host. A correct response lowers the villain's arm and allows the contestant to proceed to the next one. If the contestant answers incorrectly or fails to respond within two seconds, the correct answer is displayed on a screen set into the villain's chest and Kennedy reads a new blooper.

The contestant wins $100 for each villain passed, or $25,000 for completing the path. Since CBS had a $25,000 winnings limit in place for its game shows at the time, any contestant who completed the Gauntlet would retire as an undefeated champion.

Originally, champions could remain on the show until they either lost in the main game or completed the Gauntlet. A rule change in August 1979 forced champions to retire after failing to complete the Gauntlet five times.

The villains in the Gauntlet were, from start to finish:

1. Alphonse the Gangster
2. Bruno the Headsman
3. Mr. Van Louse the Landlord
4. Nero the Fiddler
5. Count Nibbleneck the Vampire
6. Frank and his little friend Stein
7. Kid Rotten the Gunslinger
8. Jeremy Swash the Pirate
9. Dr. Deranged the Mad Scientist
10. Lucretia the Witch

== Production information ==
Whew! was taped in Hollywood, California at CBS Television City, with production alternating between Studios 31 and 33.

== Broadcast history ==
Whew!'s debut was part of a shakeup of the overall CBS Daytime schedule. The show was given the spot on the schedule that had previously belonged to Match Game 79. At the time, the long-running Match Game 79 had been airing at 4:00 pm Eastern in the last network-programmed daytime slot of the day. (Note: The 4:00 pm timeslot proved to be unfavorable as many CBS affiliates chose to preempt network programing airing at that slot in favor of local or syndicated programming; CBS returned the 4:00 pm time slot to its affiliates in September 1986 after the last program on that slot, Press Your Luck, ended its run.)

CBS’s morning lineup featured All in the Family reruns at 10:00 am, the hour-long game show The Price Is Right at 10:30 am, and the veteran soap opera Love of Life at 11:30 am. The network added Whew! to its morning lineup and placed it at 10:30 am, following reruns of All in the Family. The Price Is Right moved thirty minutes later to 11:00 am (which it still occupies today) and relegated Love of Life to the 4:00 pm slot for Match Game 79, which resulted in the soap's cancellation months later. Whew!'s actual run time, with commercials, was 25 minutes. The remaining time (in between the show and The Price Is Right) was taken up by the five-minute CBS Mid-Morning News with Douglas Edwards.

Its network competition was restricted to NBC’s daytime lineup, as ABC did not program the 10:00 AM hour at the time (ABC affiliates chose their own programs). From its premiere, Whew! went up against All Star Secrets until that series was cancelled. NBC then relocated Hollywood Squares, which it had been shuffling around the schedule for some time by 1979 (where it aired in three separate time slots that year alone). Both programs faced each other head to head for the remainder of the run of Whew!. Incidentally, Hollywood Squares was cancelled shortly after Whew! aired its finale.

After the final episode of Whew! aired, the series was replaced the following Monday by reruns of Alice, which remained in the 10:30 am timeslot until September 1982 (when Child's Play premiered).

=== Celebrity Whew! ===
On November 5, 1979, in an attempt to increase the show's ratings, Whew! changed its format to accommodate the addition of celebrities to the game. Originally conceived as a three-week special series of episodes, the change instead became permanent on December 5 and the show adopted the title Celebrity Whew! to reflect it.

Each contestant was paired with one of the two celebrities. One member from the charging team played at a time, passing control to his/her partner after either clearing or exhausting the current level. The two shared blocking duties, with one member placing the first three blocks and the other one placing the last three. The rules were otherwise unchanged except that, toward the end of the series, any team that won the first two rounds of a match could play the third one unopposed for additional money and time with a randomly generated set of blocks.

In the Gauntlet of Villains, one member of the team took the first half and the other took the second half. As before, each $100 earned in the front game was worth one additional second on top of the base 60-second time, and completing the Gauntlet won $25,000 which retired the player immediately upon winning it.

== Theme Music ==
The theme song was composed by Alan Thicke. Original recordings of the theme were presumed to have been lost until 2012, when they were discovered by the Museum of Television Production Music.

== Episode status ==
All episodes exist in the possession of Burt Sugarman, the current copyright holder of the Whew! program and format.

On August 10, 2021, it was announced that Whew! would air on Buzzr beginning September 5, 2021, with previously unaired episodes set to air weekdays beginning the following day. The show's return to TV marks the end of a 41-year absence after CBS canceled the series in 1980. Wink Martindale and game show producer John Ricci Jr. both played a role in bringing the show to Buzzr.
