= Richard S. Kline =

American television director (1940–2020)

Richard S. Kline (March 24, 1940 – March 21, 2020) was an American television producer and director whose most notable work was in game shows. He directed and produced programs for Barry & Enright Productions until 1984, after which he formed his own production company, Kline & Friends.

== Early work ==
Prior to breaking into game shows, Kline worked as a producer for CBS News in the 1960s, then for The Dick Cavett Show in the early 1970s.

== Jack Barry Productions ==
One of Richard S. Kline's early shows where he worked as a director was on Jack Barry's The Joker's Wild on CBS, starting in 1972. He also served as an associate producer, and did both jobs until the series ended in 1975.

== Barry & Enright Productions ==
After Jack Barry and Dan Enright revived their partnership, Kline was assigned to direct a new series for them called Break the Bank, which aired on ABC in 1976 and in syndication in 1976-77.

Kline also directed syndicated revivals of both The Joker's Wild and Tic-Tac-Dough (the latter was originally revived for CBS' daytime schedule in the Summer of 1978 just before entering syndication that Fall), and a brand new B&E creation, Bullseye, in 1980, also in syndication. In 1984, he directed another new creation for B&E: Hot Potato, which ran 23 weeks on NBC.

== Jack Barry's death and the formation of Kline and Friends ==
Jack Barry died in May 1984, not too long after completing production of the 1983-84 season of Joker. Upon his death, Dan Enright immediately succeeded his longtime producing partner and began making many changes that Kline and other staffers opposed, including the choice of Bill Cullen (of Hot Potato) as the successor to Barry on Joker, as opposed to fill-in host Jim Peck, who Barry had intended to succeed him permanently for the 1984-85 season. Not long after this, Kline and some B&E staff members – including Jack Barry's two sons, Jon and Douglas, as well as composer Hal Hidey and set designer John C. Mula – left the company and formed Kline and Friends. Producer Gary Cox also joined Kline briefly, but soon left to work for Reg Grundy Productions, while Ron Greenberg became an independent producer once again.

With Kline running his own company, Break the Bank (completely unrelated to the earlier game) premiered in the fall of 1985, with Gene Rayburn as host. By year's end, Rayburn was let go due to conflict with Kline over the show's format and replaced by Joe Farago. After that, Kline tried again with Strike it Rich (unrelated to the 1950s game show) in the fall of 1986, with Joe Garagiola as host. That show did not see success either, but was exported to Britain as Strike It Lucky, which ran until 1994; it was revived in 1996, now as Michael Barrymore's Strike it Rich (to coincide with far better prizes) and ran until 1999; Australian and South African versions also ran.

After that show ended, he teamed up with Bert Convy, Burt Reynolds, and Buena Vista Television to produce Win, Lose or Draw beginning in 1987. This series had concurrent runs on both NBC and in syndication, with Vicki Lawrence hosting the network version and Convy hosting the syndicated series. Win, Lose or Draw ended its run in 1989 on NBC and in 1990 in syndication. Convy left the syndicated series at the beginning of its final season to preside over another co-production with Kline, 3rd Degree, and Robb Weller took over for him at Win, Lose or Draw. 3rd Degree was Convy's last show before his death from a brain tumor in 1991.

In March 1990, Kline and Friends began production of their only non-game show project, The Marsha Warfield Show for NBC. Later that same year in September, the company put together a new version of The Joker's Wild for syndication that was hosted by Pat Finn. The new series, which made several significant changes to the original series' format, did not succeed due to a crowded syndication market and was cancelled just past the midway point of the 1990-91 season.

In 1994, two years after Enright's death, Kline produced and directed the children's game show, Masters of the Maze, hosted by J. D. Roth, then Mario Lopez, for The Family Channel. The show used innovative technology for the time to create the titular maze, including chroma-key and CGI animation. 1997 saw Kline produce Pictionary, a television version of the board game of the same name, hosted by Alan Thicke, which used a nearly identical format to that of Win, Lose or Draw a decade earlier. This was Kline and Friends' last game show.

== Death ==
Kline died on March 21, 2020, at the age of 79 at his home in Connecticut following a long illness.
