= List of Western Washington University alumni =

This is a list of alumni and attendees of Western Washington University, a public university in Bellingham, Washington.

== List ==
=== Business ===
- Hoby Darling, business executive and president of Riot Games
- Julie Larson-Green, businesswoman and former CXO of Qualtrics

=== Government and law ===
- Richard Barlow, intelligence analyst
- Michael Farris, lawyer and founder of Patrick Henry College
- Kelli Linville, politician and former mayor of Bellingham, Washington
- Ralph Munro, former secretary of state of Washington
- Larry Springer, member of the Washington House of Representatives

=== Music and entertainment ===
- Tori Black, adult film actress and AVN Hall of Fame member
- Carrie Brownstein, musician and actress
- Dan Erickson, creator of Severance
- Ben Gibbard, musician and vocalist of Death Cab for Cutie
- Nick Harmer, member of Death Cab for Cutie
- Clayton Knight, musician and member of Odesza
- TJ Martin, film director and Academy Award winner
- Harrison Mills, member of Odesza
- Heidi Grant Murphy, operatic soprano
- Erin Wall, operatic soprano
- Hiro Yamamoto, bassist for Soundgarden

=== Science and academia ===
- Peter Kalivas, neuroscientist and speaker
- Douglas Massey, sociologist at Princeton University
- Joseph Mougous, microbiologist at Yale University
- Sarah Myhre, climate scientist
- Michael E. Phelps, developer of the positron emission tomography scanner

=== Sports ===
- Ryan Couture, professional mixed martial artist
- Sarah Crouch, long-distance runner
- Ben Dragavon, professional soccer coach
- Breezy Johnson, skier and Olympic gold medalist
- Brian Fairbrother, high school soccer coach
- Brian Holsinger, college basketball coach
- Daulton Hommes, professional basketball player
- Matt Overton, professional football player
- Bob Robertson, sports broadcaster
- Tilali Scanlan, Olympic swimmer

=== Writers ===
- William Dietrich, novelist, journalist, and Pulitzer Prize winner
- Darril Fosty, author and documentarian
- Gregg Olsen, true crime author
- Ijeoma Oluo, writer
- Zoa Sherburne, author

=== Other ===
- Robert Angel, creator of Pictionary
- Mike Duncan, history podcaster
- John Michael Greer, druid and writer
- Agnes Martin, abstract painter
- Elizabeth Peratrovich, civil rights activist
- Heather Purser, Native American LGBT rights advocate
