= The Cheers =

US musical group

The Cheers were an American vocal group who had a string of novelty hits for Capitol Records in the mid-1950s starting with "(Bazoom) I Need Your Lovin'" which hit number fifteen on the U.S. chart in 1954. This was the first hit written by Jerry Leiber and Mike Stoller to chart on the pop chart in the United States, and it was one of the first rock and roll hits by a white group (after The Crew Cuts and Bill Haley and the Comets). The following year, they followed it with "Black Denim Trousers and Motorcycle Boots" (also written by Leiber and Stoller), a song about a wild-living leather-jacketed motorcyclist, which went to number six on the charts.

The Cheers' members included Bert Convy, who would later serve as host of several daytime television game shows such as Tattletales, Super Password, Win, Lose or Draw and 3rd Degree; Perry Botkin, Jr., who would later become a successful composer/arranger winning a Grammy Award for Nadia's Theme; Susan (Sue) Allen, and Gil Garfield. All three were living in Los Angeles at the time they began making records: Garfield was attending the University of Southern California and Convy had just graduated from UCLA when they teamed up with vocalist Allen. Leiber and Stoller wrote and produced "Chicken" (1955) for The Cheers, parodying the central sequence from James Dean's film Rebel Without a Cause.

Garfield remained with the Cheers for about three years before leaving the music industry and going into the real estate business. He died of cancer in 2011 at age 77. Convy died of a brain tumor in 1991 at age 57. Sue Allen continued to record into the 1960s, providing vocals for performers such as Ray Conniff and Mel Tormé.
