= Hollywood Connection =

American game show

- Genre: Game show
- Directed by: Richard S. Kline
- Presented by: Jim Lange
- Announcer: Johnny Gilbert; Jay Stewart
- Country of origin: United States
- No. of episodes: 90

Production
- Producer: Ron Greenberg
- Running time: approx. 22 minutes
- Production companies: Jack Barry-Dan Enright Productions; Golden West Broadcasters

Original release
- Network: Syndicated (daily)
- Release: September 5, 1977 – March 3, 1978

The Hollywood Connection is an American game show that ran in syndication from September 5, 1977 to March 3, 1978. Jim Lange hosted the series, while Jay Stewart (Johnny Gilbert in earlier episodes) announced. The series was produced by Barry & Enright Productions in association with Golden West Broadcasters.

== Premise ==
Two contestants faced a panel of six celebrities in a game of answering questions about the stars themselves, a concept similar in format to Match Game. As in Match Game, the contestants' goal is to match the stars' answers in order to score points; this is classified as "making a connection".

== Main game ==
=== Round 1 ===
The player who won the coin toss chose which row of celebrities (either the top or bottom) to play with. Lange then read a question to the celebrities with two possible answers, after which the stars wrote down their response. When finished, the player in control chose one of the answers that they think the star would say (unlike Match Game, the contestant gave an answer for each individual panelist, rather than the entire panel). Each time the player made a connection, they earned 1 point. After the first player was done, their opponent then had a chance to play with the other row of three celebrities.

=== Round 2 ===
Played in the same manner as Round One, except the player who did not start the last round went first in this round. That player chose to either play with the male stars or the female stars. Each question had three choices, and each connection was worth 2 points.

=== Round 3 ===
In Round Three, whoever was behind or, in case of a tie, did not go first in the previous round, went first. Each question still had three choices and each connection was worth 3 points. Whoever scored more points at the end of the game won, receives some prizes, and played the bonus round. In the event of a tie, sudden death was played to determine the champion.

A perfect score is 18 points.

== Bonus round ==
=== Format #1 (first week only) ===
The celebrities and the champion were shown a picture of a famous person, place or thing, then the celebrities wrote down a word or phrase associated with the picture. The champion wrote down three answers of his/her own and placed them next to the values of $300, $200 and $100, with the answer marked at $300 the one the contestant thought the panel would be most likely to write down.

The champion called on the stars one-by-one and tried to match what they had written. Each time the panelist's answer matched one of the champion's, the champion won the money attached to that answer. After all the stars have shown their answers, if the champion reached at least $1,000, he/she won $2,000 and a trip.

=== Format #2 ===
The champion still wrote down three key words as above, except each connection was worth $250 instead of the original scoring format. Three connections won the champion $750 and a trip. After winning the trip, the champion earned a chance to make two more connections; each one doubled the contestant's money, meaning that the first one doubled to $1,500, and one more doubled to the maximum amount of $3,000.

If at any time the champion was unable to make a connection, the bonus round ended and the money was lost (although the trip was not in jeopardy). The champion had the option before each double round to stop and take the money already won, as well as the trip. But they get a special bonus with the trip.

== Music ==
- The theme song used on the show is "Virgo" by Robert Ascot. It was previously the theme music for an earlier Jack Barry game show, Hollywood's Talking (albeit with a slightly different arrangement).
- The think music which plays while the stars write down their responses ("Gamineries" by Jean Leroi) would later be heard as the category reveal music on another Barry & Enright game show, The Joker's Wild.
- The think music played during the bonus round was "Gentleman Jim" by Bert Kaempfert.

== Episode status ==
The series has been rerun on GSN.
