= Matt Deitke =

American AI researcher and entrepreneur

- Born: 2001 (age 24–25); United States
- Education: University of Washington (BS)
- Occupations: AI researcher, entrepreneur
- Employer: Meta Platforms
- Known for: Vercept, Allen Institute for AI, Meta Superintelligence Lab
- Website: mattdeitke.com

Matt Deitke (born 2001) is an American artificial intelligence researcher and entrepreneur. As of August 2025, he works at Meta Platforms’s Superintelligence Lab, after accepting a $250 million employment offer, following earlier public attention around declining a $125 million offer from the same company. He is also known for his work at the Allen Institute for AI and as the co-founder of the AI startup Vercept.

== Early life and education ==
Matt Deitke was born around 2001 in suburban Chicago, Illinois, United States. He developed an early interest in computer vision and AI technologies. Deitke enrolled in a Ph.D. program in Computer Science at the University of Washington, where he began research into embodied AI and machine learning, but ultimately dropped out to focus on industry research and entrepreneurship.

== Career ==
=== Allen Institute for AI ===
After leaving academia, Deitke joined the Allen Institute for AI (AI2), based in Seattle, Washington, where he contributed to multimodal reasoning systems and vision-language models. There he was involved in the development of an AI chatbot named Molmo, a project that uses images, sound, and text.

=== Vercept ===
In November 2024, Deitke co-founded an AI startup called Vercept, which aimed to develop autonomous agents capable of performing open-ended tasks in real-world environments. Despite having only about ten employees at launch, the startup reportedly secured $16.5 million in venture capital funding.

=== Meta Superintelligence Lab ===
In mid-2025, Deitke received a job offer from Meta Platforms to join their Superintelligence Lab, initially worth $125 million. He declined the initial offer. After a personal meeting with Meta CEO Mark Zuckerberg, the offer was revised and doubled to a reported $250 million across four years. Deitke accepted the updated offer and officially joined Meta as a lead researcher within its Superintelligence Lab at age 24.

== Awards ==
Outstanding Paper Award at NeurIPS 2022.
