= Hanna Hajishirzi =

Iranian-American computer scientist

Hannaneh Hajishirzi is an Iranian-American computer scientist specializing in natural language processing. She is Torode Family Professor in Computer Science & Engineering in the Paul G. Allen School of Computer Science and Engineering at the University of Washington, head of the H2Lab in the Allen School, and a senior director of natural language processing in the Allen Institute for AI.

== Education and career ==
After a bachelor's degree from the Sharif University of Technology, Hajishirzi completed her Ph.D. in computer science in 2011, at the University of Illinois Urbana-Champaign. Her dissertation, Action-Centered Reasoning for Probabilistic Dynamic Systems, was supervised by Eyal Amir.

After postdoctoral research at Disney Research in Pittsburgh, Hajishirzi joined the University of Washington in 2012, as a research scientist in electrical engineering. In 2015 she became a research assistant professor in electrical engineering. She obtained a regular-rank assistant professorship in 2018, at the same time becoming an AI Fellow in the Allen Institute for AI, where she became a senior director of research in 2021. She was promoted to associate professor in 2022 and to full professor in 2025.

== Recognition ==
In 2021, Hajishirzi was a recipient of an NSF CAREER award. Hajishirzi was named as a Fellow of the Association for Computational Linguistics in 2025, "for significant contributions to question answering, scientific applications, multimodal artificial intelligence, and fully open language models".

== Personal life ==
Hajishirzi is married to Ali Farhadi, the CEO of the Allen Institute for AI.
