= Michel Robbe =

French actor and television host

Michel Robbe (born 3 June 1946) is a French film and theater actor and television host.

Robbe began his career by working in restaurants. He was first an actor (Circulez, y'a rien à voir, Bête mais discipliné), then went on to host Wheel of Fortune (La Roue de la Fortune) on TF1, as well as Break the Bank (La Porte Magique) in 1987 on La Cinq and En route pour l'aventure, a program for children on the same channel. He also played the role of Nans le Berger in the series directed by Roland Bernard, brother of Jean-Paul Rouland and Jacques Rouland.

He also played the role of Jean-Paul in the series Les Vacances de l'amour, and that of Armand Denardin in the series Cinq Sœurs.

== Theater ==
- 1971: La Nuit des rois by William Shakespeare, Théâtre de l'Ouest Parisien
- 1972: Le Cid by Pierre Corneille, Théâtre de la Ville
- 1975: Tutti-Frutti by Francis Perrin, Théâtre de l'Atelier
- 1981: Le Jardin d'Eponine by Maria Pacôme, Gérard Vergez, Comédie des Champs-Élysées
