= Bert Convy =

American actor, singer, game show panelist and host (1933–1991)

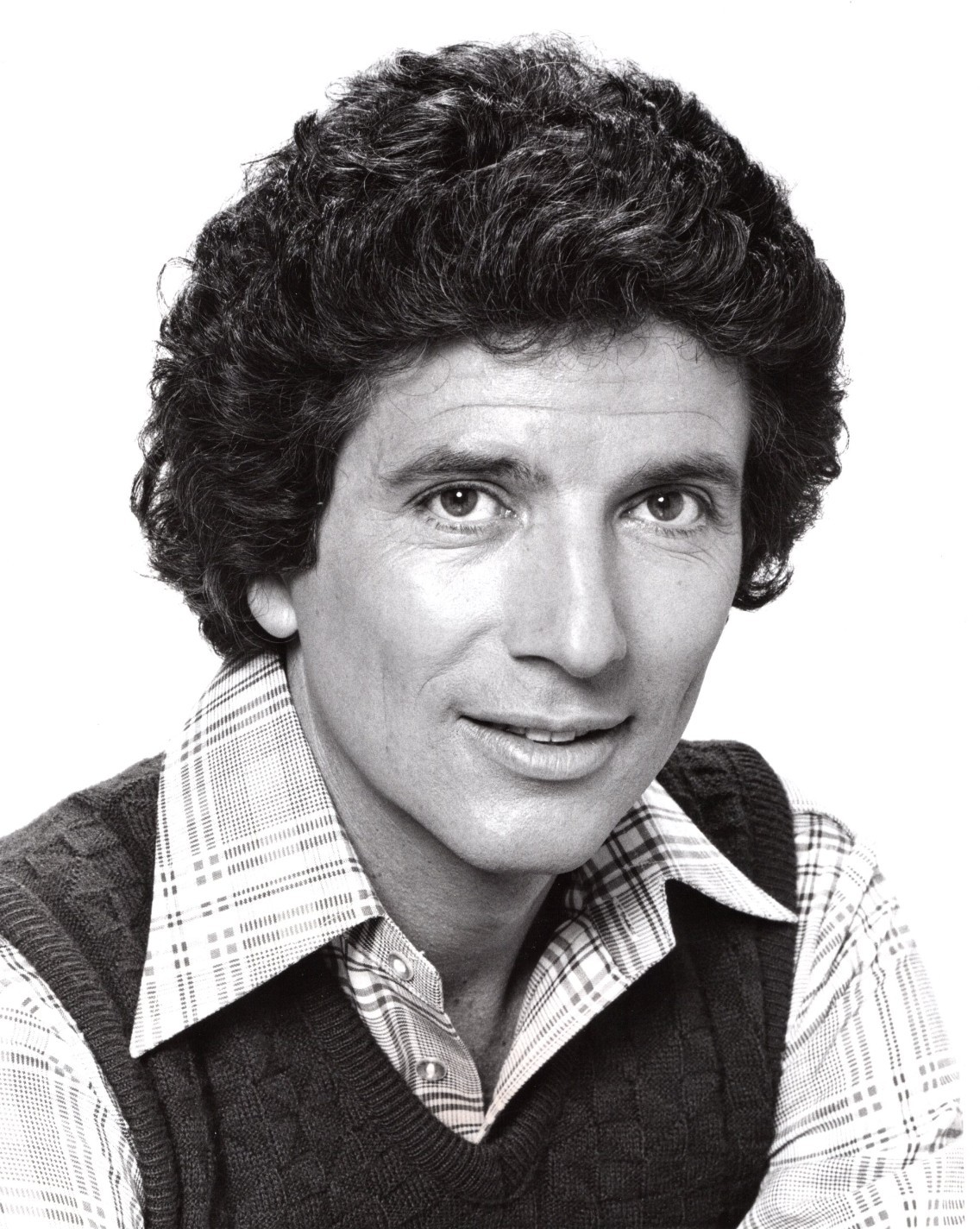
- Convy in 1976
- Born: Bernard Whalen Convy; July 23, 1933; St. Louis, Missouri, U.S.
- Died: July 15, 1991 (aged 57); Brentwood, Los Angeles, California, U.S.
- Resting place: Forest Lawn – Hollywood Hills Cemetery
- Education: UCLA School of Theater, Film and Television
- Occupations: Actor; singer; game show host
- Years active: 1955–1990
- Spouse(s): Anne Anderson (m. 1959; div. 1991) Catherine Hills (m. 1991)
- Children: 3

Bernard Whalen "Bert" Convy (July 23, 1933 – July 15, 1991) was an American actor, singer, game-show panelist, and host known for Tattletales, Super Password and Win, Lose or Draw.

== Early life ==
Convy was born in St. Louis, Missouri, the son of Bernard Fleming and Monica (née Whalen) Convy. Convy's family moved to Los Angeles when he was 7 years old. He later attended North Hollywood High School, where he was an all-around athlete. The Philadelphia Phillies offered him a contract when he was just 17 and he played two years of Minor League Baseball in 1951–52. He later joined the 1950s vocal band The Cheers, who had a top-10 hit in 1955 with "Black Denim Trousers and Motorcycle Boots".

Convy attended UCLA School of Theater, Film and Television, where he received a bachelor's degree.

== Career ==
=== Early years ===
After a two-season stint in the Philadelphia Phillies' minor league system with the Klamath Falls Gems, Miami Eagles and Salina Blue Jays, Convy began his career in the entertainment business as a featured performer and singer in the Billy Barnes Revues of the 1950s and 1960s. Bert portrayed a CBS usher on Art Linkletter's House Party in 1956. He appeared in the 1961 Warner Bros. drama Susan Slade, playing Troy Donahue′s rival for the affections of Connie Stevens. Convy went on to become a Broadway actor, starring as Perchik in the original cast of Fiddler on the Roof (1964), appearing in The Impossible Years (1965), and creating the role of Cliff Bradshaw in Cabaret (1966). He also appeared in the Roger Corman film A Bucket of Blood, playing Lou Raby, and in the soap opera Love of Life, playing Glenn Hamilton, a rapist. He also appeared on The Partridge Family, playing the role of politician Richard Lawrence in the 1972 episode "A Likely Candidate".

=== Game shows ===
In the 1960s and 1970s, Convy was a popular semi-regular panelist on several game shows, including What's My Line?, To Tell the Truth, Match Game (he later starred as the host of the pilot for Match Game '90 in 1989), and Password. He soon took the podium himself as host of several game shows, including the fourth edition of Password (called Super Password, which ran from 1984–1989) and Tattletales (1974–1978, 1982–1984), for which he won a Daytime Emmy Award for Outstanding Game Show Host in 1977. In 1979, he appeared on Password Plus with fellow celebrity contestants such as Elizabeth Montgomery, Carol Burnett, Phyllis Diller, Judy Norton Taylor, Marcia Wallace and Elaine Joyce.

Convy and Burt Reynolds formed their own production company, Burt and Bert Productions, during the 1980s. Their first production was a game show titled Win, Lose, or Draw, which made its debut in 1987 as part of the NBC daytime lineup and in nightly syndication. Convy hosted the syndicated edition of Win, Lose, or Draw for its first two seasons, then left the show to host another of his company's productions, the syndicated 3rd Degree.

When 3rd Degree went to pilot, Peter Marshall was brought in to be the host. When the series was picked up for syndication, however, Convy decided to leave his position as the host of the syndicated edition of Win, Lose, or Draw and take Marshall's place on 3rd Degree. Marshall filed a lawsuit against Convy for the action, but later dropped it after Convy's cancer diagnosis was made public.

In 1989, Convy was called upon by Mark Goodson Productions again to host a week's worth of pilot episodes for a revival of Match Game that Goodson was attempting to sell to ABC. Convy was supposed to have been the host when the series made it to air in 1990, but had to drop out after being diagnosed with brain cancer. He was replaced by Ross Shafer.

=== Acting ===
Convy turned to acting full-time in 1956 and was in the musical The Billy Barnes Revue in Los Angeles before moving to New York City. He appeared in 10 Broadway shows, including Nowhere to Go but Up, Cabaret (in which he originated the role of Cliff, a fictionalized Christopher Isherwood), and The Impossible Years. He played reporter Hildy Johnson in a 1969 Broadway revival of The Front Page, which starred Robert Ryan. In the original Broadway cast of Fiddler on the Roof with Zero Mostel, Convy played Perchik the Student and sang "Now I Have Everything". He filled in for Raul Julia in the lead role of Guido Contini in the Broadway musical Nine when Julia went on vacation.

Convy was one of the candidates considered for the role of Bert in Mary Poppins but Convy turned down the offer and the role was given to Dick Van Dyke.

Convy guest-starred in an April 1960 episode of Perry Mason titled "The Case of the Nimble Nephew". In the 1960–1961 season, Convy guest-starred on Pat O'Brien's short-lived sitcom Harrigan and Son and the series 77 Sunset Strip in the role of David. In 1961, he appeared in the Alfred Hitchcock Presents episode "Museum Piece". He portrayed Roxy in the pilot episode of The New Phil Silvers Show in 1963, although the role went to Pat Renella for the remainder of the series' run. He was also cast on an episode of The Mary Tyler Moore Show as Mary's friend Jack Foster, alongside future Alice star Beth Howland. In 1973, Convy was a guest star in two episodes of Hawaii Five-O.

In 1974, Convy portrayed Lieutenant Steve Ostrowski, the police officer nephew of elderly amateur sleuths on the short-lived series The Snoop Sisters.

Convy attempted a short-lived variety series called The Late Summer Early Fall Bert Convy Show in 1976. In 1979, he appeared with the Dallas Cowboys Cheerleaders in their eponymous television movie, Dallas Cowboys Cheerleaders. Throughout his career, Convy was a frequent guest star on series such as Bewitched, Hawaii Five-O, The Partridge Family, Mission: Impossible, The Silent Force, The New Phil Silvers Show, Fantasy Island, Charlie's Angels, and Murder, She Wrote (including the pilot episode). On The Love Boat, Season 2 Episode 11: "Legal Eagles" (1978), he played Danny Holt, a divorced man who falls for his ex-wife's lawyer. In 1983, Convy was cast as Neil Townsend on the sitcom It's Not Easy, playing opposite Ken Howard. Convy had joined the project when it was recast after its intended premiere in the 1982–83 season was delayed; he earned the role originally given to Larry Breeding, who was killed in a car accident in September 1982 after the first pilot had been shot.

Convy also starred in several movies, perhaps most memorably Semi-Tough (1977), in which he played a caricature of Werner Erhard named Friedrich Bismark. His other film credits included A Bucket of Blood (1959), Susan Slade (1961), Philippe de Broca's Les Caprices de Marie (1970), SST: Death Flight (1977), the horror film Jennifer (1978), Hanging by a Thread (1979), Racquet (1979), The Man in the Santa Claus Suit (1979), Hero at Large (1980), The Cannonball Run (1981), and the television movie Help Wanted: Male (1982). Convy tried his hand at directing with the comedy Weekend Warriors (1986). In 1980, Convy produced and directed the Goodspeed Musicals premiere of Zapata, with music and lyrics by Harry Nilsson and Perry Botkin Jr. and libretto by Allan Katz.

== Personal life ==
Convy was married twice. He married Anne Anderson in 1959; together they had three children: Jennifer, Joshua, and Jonah. Convy and Anderson separated sometime before their divorce in 1991. Despite suffering from brain cancer, Convy then married his girlfriend Catherine Hills.

== Death ==
In April 1990, Convy was admitted to Cedars-Sinai Medical Center after collapsing while visiting his mother, who had been hospitalized for a stroke. He was diagnosed with glioblastoma, an aggressive and extremely deadly brain cancer, which forced him into retirement.

On July 15, 1991, Convy died at his home in Brentwood, Los Angeles, with Catherine by his side, eight days before his 58th birthday. He is buried at Forest Lawn Memorial Park in the Hollywood Hills of Los Angeles.

== Partial filmography ==
- Gunman's Walk (1958) as Paul Chauard
- A Bucket of Blood (1959) as Lou Raby
- One Step Beyond (March 15, 1960) (Season 2 Episode 26: "The Explorer") as Professor Andersson
- Perry Mason (1960) (Season 3 Episode 21: "The Nimble Nephew") as Harry Thompson
- Alfred Hitchcock Presents (1961) (Season 6 Episode 25: "Museum Piece") as Ben Hollister
- Susan Slade (1961) as Wells Corbett
- Act One (1961) as Archie Leach
- 77 Sunset Strip (April 7, 1961) (Season 3 Episode 30: "Vamp 'til Ready") as Pianist David Todd
- The New Phil Silvers Show (1963) (Season 1 Episode 5: "Harry Today, Gone Tomorrow") as Roxy
- Bewitched (1970) (Season 7 Episode 6: “Paul Revere Rides Again”) as Paul Revere
- Give Her the Moon (1970) as Broderick MacPower
- Death Takes a Holiday (TV movie, 1971) as John Cummings
- Night Gallery (1971) (Season 1 Episode 6a: "They're Tearing Down Tim Riley's Bar") as Harvey Doane
- Keep the Faith (1972) as Rabbi Miller
- Mission: Impossible (1972) (Season 6 Episode 22: "Trapped") as Doug Stafford
- The Mary Tyler Moore Show (1972) (Season 3 Episode 10: "Have I Found a Guy for You") as Jack Foster
- Lady Luck (TV movie, 1973) as Clay
- The Girl on the Late, Late Show (TV movie, 1974) as F.J. Allen
- Shakespeare Loves Rembrandt (TV movie, 1974)
- Hawaii Five-O (1975) (Season 7 Episode 17: "Small Witness, Large Crime") as Hubbard
- The Love Boat II (TV movie, 1977) as Ralph Manning
- SST: Death Flight (TV movie, 1977) as Tim Vernon
- Semi-Tough (1977) as Friedrich Bismark
- Jennifer (1978) as Jeff Reed
- Thou Shalt Not Commit Adultery (TV movie, 1978) as Bill Dent
- Dallas Cowboys Cheerleaders (TV movie, 1979) as Lyman Spencer
- Hanging by a Thread (TV movie, 1979) as Alan Durant
- Racquet (1979) as Tommy Everett
- Charlie's Angels (1979) (Season 4 Episode 1: "Love Boat Angels") as Paul Hollister
- Ebony, Ivory and Jade (TV movie, 1979) as Mick Jade
- The Man in the Santa Claus Suit (TV movie, 1979) as Gil Travis
- Hero at Large (1980) as Walter Reeves
- The Cannonball Run (1981) as Brad
- Jacqueline Susann's Valley of the Dolls (TV mini-series, 1981) as Tony Polar
- Help Wanted: Male (TV movie, 1982) as Skip McCullough
- Love Thy Neighbor (TV movie, 1984) as Mike Wilson

== See also ==
- List of notable brain tumor patients
