= Ali Farhadi =

American computer scientist (born 1982)

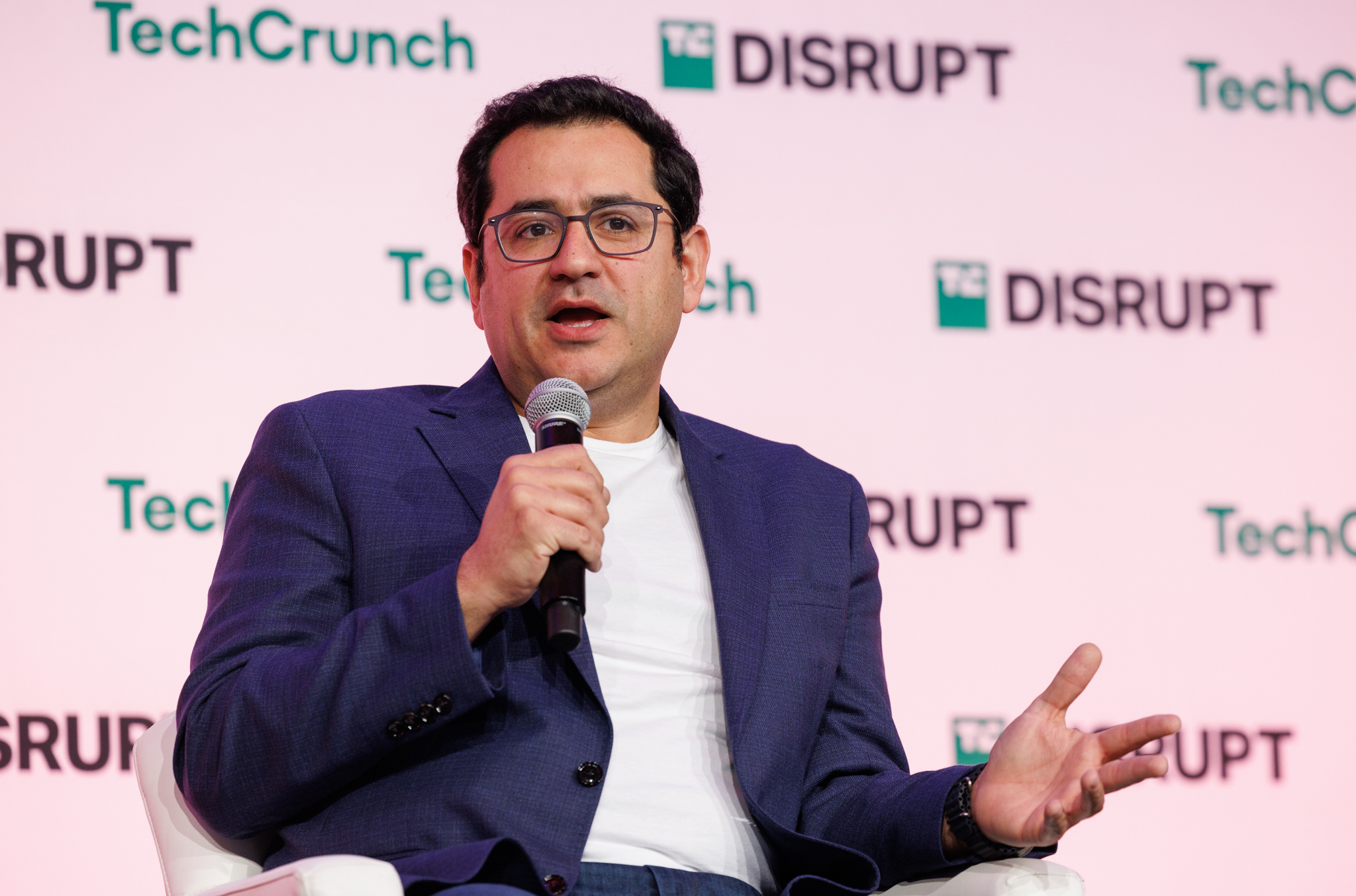
- Ali Farhadi at TechCrunch Disrupt 2024
- Born: 1982 (age 43–44)
- Occupation: CEO

Ali Farhadi is a professor of computer science and the CEO of the Allen Institute for Artificial Intelligence (AI2).

== Career ==
Farhadi is an AI professor in the Paul G. Allen School of Computer Science & Engineering at the University of Washington in Seattle.

== Recognitions ==
Among other awards and recognitions, Farhadi was one of the winners of the 2017 Sloan Research Fellowship granted by the Alfred P. Sloan Foundation.

== Personal life ==
Farhadi is married to Hanna Hajishirzi, a computer science professor at the University of Washington and senior director at the Allen Institute who studies natural language processing.
