= The Pop 'N Rocker Game =

- Genre: Game show
- Directed by: Arthur Forrest
- Presented by: Jon Bauman
- Narrated by: Phil Hartman; M. G. Kelly
- Theme music composer: Bruce Gary; Berton Averre
- Country of origin: United States

Production
- Executive producers: Ron Greenberg; Alan Landsburg
- Producer: David Yarnell
- Production locations: ABC Television Center; Los Angeles, California
- Running time: approx. 22–26 minutes
- Production companies: Ron Greenberg Productions; Alan Landsburg Productions

Original release
- Network: Broadcast syndication
- Release: September 17, 1983 – September 1984

The Pop 'N Rocker Game is an American game show and variety show produced by Ron Greenberg Productions and Alan Landsburg Productions. The program premiered on September 17, 1983, and aired through September 1984 and combined musical trivia with in-studio performances. Two bands were featured on every episode; as such, the show was touted at the opening of each show as a "Game in Concert".

Jon Bauman was the show's host, and both Phil Hartman and M. G. Kelly served as announcers. Some notable bands that appeared on The Pop 'N Rocker Game were Mötley Crüe, Huey Lewis and the News, Culture Club, Oingo Boingo, and The Commodores. The very first televised appearance of the Bangles with new bassist Michael Steele happened on The Pop 'N Rocker Game.

== Gameplay ==
Three teenagers competed. Five or six pop music trivia questions were asked; some of them having to deal with visual clues (such as pictures or clips from music videos). Each question was worth $50. After the final question was asked, the performer mentioned in the question would come out and perform a song (hence why the show was billed as "a game in concert" in its intro).

After this performance, the Countdown Round was played. The questions started at $50, and increased by $10 for every question. This continued for 60 seconds. The contestant in the lead won the game and moved on to the Superstar Round. If the game ended in a two-way tie for first place, or if all three tied, Bauman read one last question, with the person ringing in and answering correctly winning the game.

In the Superstar Round, the contestant had to unscramble the names of bands. Jon would read a clue to every one. If they could unscramble three in 30 seconds, they won a prize package worth over $2,000. After the bonus round, one of the bands mentioned in the bonus round would come out and perform a song.

The show would end with one final song by the first performer.
