= The Challengers (game show) =

1990–1991 US television program

- The Challengers opening logo.
- Genre: Game show
- Created by: Ron Greenberg
- Based on: The Who, What, or Where Game
- Directed by: Morris Abraham, Chris Darley
- Presented by: Dick Clark
- Judges: Gary Johnson
- Announcer: Don Morrow
- Composers: Joel Hirschhorn; Al Kasha; Michael Lloyd
- Country of origin: United States
- No. of episodes: 240

Production
- Production locations: The Prospect Studios; Hollywood, California (1989 pilot); Hollywood Center Studios; Hollywood, California (1990-1991)
- Running time: approx. 22-24 minutes
- Production companies: Ron Greenberg Productions; Dick Clark Productions; Buena Vista Television

Original release
- Network: Syndicated
- Release: September 3, 1990 – August 2, 1991

The Challengers is an American game show that aired in syndication during the 1990-91 television season. The series was created by Ron Greenberg and was based largely on his 1969 production The Who, What, or Where Game. Dick Clark presided over the show with Don Morrow announcing. The Challengers was a joint production of Ron Greenberg Productions and Dick Clark Productions, with Buena Vista Television (now Disney–ABC Domestic Television) as distributor.

The Challengers premiered on September 3, 1990, and aired new episodes until August 2, 1991. A series of reruns filled out the remainder of its broadcast run, which ended on August 30, 1991. The program was one of five syndicated game shows to premiere in the fall of 1990 and had the longest run of the five due to its production schedule, but like the others it was not renewed for a second season.

== Gameplay ==
Three contestants, one a returning champion, competed on each show.

=== Challengers Sprint Round ===
Clark asked a series of rapid-fire toss-up questions for 60 seconds, with each question worth $100. Each question could only be answered by one contestant, with the value of the question added for a correct answer and deducted for an incorrect answer. Beginning on September 24, 1990, and continuing for the remainder of the run, contestants were staked with $200 to start the game.

Once the round ended, the contestant in the lead gained initial control of the board for the first round. In the event of a tie, one more question was asked; the contestant that answered it correctly started the first round, but answering incorrectly gave that privilege to the other contestant.

For several weeks in the early portion of the run, the Challengers Sprint was not played. Instead, one $100 toss-up question was asked and the contestant who answered it correctly was given control of the first round board.

=== Round 1 ===
Six categories, each containing three questions, were displayed on a video wall. The contestant in the lead after the Challengers Sprint (or the one who answered the single toss-up correctly when the Sprint was not in use) chose one to begin the round. The contestants were then given clues to the subjects of the three questions, valued at $150, $200, and $250 in order of increasing difficulty (later reduced to $100, $150, and $200). Correct answers added the value of the question to the contestant's score, while incorrect answers subtracted the same value.

Each contestant secretly chose one of the three questions using buttons on their podiums, and their choices affected the gameplay as follows:

- Each contestant chose a different question. The three questions were asked in increasing order of value, with each contestant answering his/her own question.
- Two contestants chose one question; the third contestant chose a different one. The two questions were asked in increasing order of value. The solo contestant had to answer his/her own question, while the two who chose the same question used their buzzers. If the first contestant of the two who chose the same question answered incorrectly, the other could either pass or try to answer.
- All three contestants chose the same question. All three question values were immediately doubled, and the chosen question was asked as a toss-up open to all three contestants. The same toss-up rules as above applied. A contestant who answered correctly could either end the category or attempt either of the remaining two questions unopposed. Correctly answering this second question again gave the contestant the option to stop or try the third question. An incorrect answer on either the second or third question subtracted its doubled value from the contestant's score and ended the category.

In each case, the category was eliminated from play and the last contestant to give a correct answer chose the next one. Play continued until all six categories were played or time ran out.

=== Round 2 ===
Six new categories were introduced and play continued as described above, with all question values doubled ($300/$400/$500, later $200/$300/$400).

As in round one, play continued until all six categories were played or time ran out. Any contestants who finished the round with a zero or negative score were eliminated from the game.

=== Final Challenge ===
One final category was presented, with three question choices, each of which offered different payout odds of 1:1, 2:1, or 3:1 ranked by increasing difficulty. The contestants had 15 seconds to secretly choose a question and decide how much of their score they wanted to wager on it. If multiple contestants chose the same question, only the one who placed the largest wager was allowed to answer it; the others were locked out of the round.

Answering a question correctly won the value of the wager multiplied by the odds, while a miss deducted only the value of the wager. The contestant in the lead after this round won the game and returned as champion the next day, although all contestants kept what they had earned. Contestants could choose to receive their winnings in cash or have them deposited into a Citibank Visa account that would be opened in their name. Later, they were given the additional option of opening a MasterCard account instead. Champions remained on the show until they were defeated.

If only one contestant finished the second round with a positive total, he/she had the option to skip the Final Challenge. If he/she decided to play it, the contestant was shown the category and the question choices. He/she then selected one and made a wager. Giving an incorrect answer deducted the wager and ended the game. Answering correctly, as before, won the value of the wager times the odds attached, and the contestant was given the choice to stop or continue playing. The round continued until all three questions had been attempted, or if the contestant either gave an incorrect answer or decided to stop.

=== Ultimate Challenge ===
The Ultimate Challenge served as a bonus round for contestants. Played in two different formats, the Ultimate Challenge was eventually done away with by the end of the season.

==== Format #1 ====
The initial Ultimate Challenge format saw the round played for an accumulating cash jackpot. The difference between it and most other game show bonus rounds was that a champion had to qualify to play the round by winning three consecutive matches. When a champion qualified, the round would be played at the start of the next episode, and the first round of the main game would be shortened to accommodate it.

Two categories were presented to the champion at the beginning of the round, and each one had three different question subjects. The champion selected a category and was then shown the question subjects in the order in which they would be asked, and was given five seconds to think before answering each question. Answering all three questions correctly won the Ultimate Challenge and the jackpot, while an incorrect answer at any point ended the round and awarded nothing.

Originally, the jackpot had a starting value of $50,000 and was to increase in value by $5,000 for each time the Ultimate Challenge was played and not won. The series began with the jackpot at $55,000, since the round had been played on a special preview episode prior to its actual premiere and was not won. During the first two weeks of episodes, however, no champion won enough games to play the Ultimate Challenge. Therefore, two changes were made to the format beginning on the September 17, 1990 episode of The Challengers. One change took effect immediately, adding $1,000 to the jackpot every day it went unclaimed whether a champion had played for it or not. The other took effect once the jackpot was won, as the starting value was cut to $25,000.

The first Ultimate Challenge played after the preview episode was on September 24, 1990, and successfully completed for $60,000. The last Ultimate Challenge under its original format was played on November 20, 1990, and was successfully completed for $31,000. In between those dates, the round was played three additional times and won twice.

==== Format #2 ====
Beginning on November 21, 1990, the Ultimate Challenge was played daily at the end of the program for $10,000. Once the category was given to the champion (originally, there was a choice of two as before), he/she was asked one question that could (and often did) require multiple answers. To win the $10,000 prize, the champion had to correctly answer all parts of the question.

== Tournaments ==
=== Tournament of Champions ===
For the first two months that The Challengers was on the air, contestants were not only competing to win money but were also trying to earn spots in the show's Tournament of Champions. The tournament was conducted the week of November 12, 1990, and its structure was similar to the one employed by Jeopardy! during its own tournaments.

The nine highest winning contestants through November 9, 1990 qualified for the tournament. They competed three at a time over the first three days of the tournament. The winners advanced to the finals, which began on November 15 and were a two-day, cumulative score match. The contestant with the highest total score after those two days won a $25,000 bonus. All participants kept whatever money they had earned.

=== Teachers Tournament ===
Nine teachers competed, using the same format as the Tournament of Champions and awarding a $10,000 bonus to the overall winner.

=== Invitational Tournament ===
The Challengers invited nine more champions back for a tournament, which was held the week of March 18, 1991 and followed the same structure as the two previous ones. A $10,000 bonus was awarded to the winner as in the Teachers Tournament.

== Questions ==
Many questions were related to current events, an aspect that the producers saw as a selling point. Episodes were taped shortly before their airdate, which was prominently displayed in the opening and on a screen behind Clark; generally, a week of episodes were taped on the Friday of the previous week, which allowed such categories as "This Week On TV" and "Today At The Movies" to be used frequently.

Most of the current event questions and answers were taken from, or verified by, Newsweek; this was announced on-air at the midpoint of each episode.

The series was also unique in its payout structure: contestants received their winnings on a Citibank Mastercard or Visa credit card, although Clark referenced in some episodes that contestants had the option of converting the balance to cash.
