= ISketch =

Defunct online drawing game (1999-2019)

iSketch
- Developer: Robert Wahlstedt
- Release: June 15, 1999; 26 years ago
- Genres: Casual, browser game
- Modes: Single-player, multiplayer

iSketch was a drawing browser game that was similar to Pictionary. It was launched by Robert Wahlstedt on June 15, 1999, and was written in Adobe Shockwave. As of April 9, 2019, support for Adobe Shockwave was discontinued, and the game ceased to function correctly and has not been updated.

== Gameplay ==
The objective of iSketch is to score points by guessing words. Each player gets a turn as the "artist", in which they draw a word or phrase while the other players attempt to guess it. The artist can use a mouse or graphics tablet to draw, and is given a set of on-screen drawing tools including pens, brushes, an eraser, a fill tool, and a color palette. When another player successfully guesses the word or phrase, both that player and the artist score points. The artist scores additional points for each additional player who also successfully guesses the phrase before time runs out, while each additional player scores one point less than the player before them.

iSketch provides word lists in more than twenty languages, multiple difficulty levels, and numerous themes. There are several game variations, including Blitz (in which the round ends immediately as soon as a player guesses the word), Tandem (where two artists work together), Big Picture (in which two unrelated words must be combined into a single drawing), Connections (where the previous word must be somehow incorporated into the current drawing), and 5 Strokes (where the artist has just five pen strokes to express his/her subject).

In addition to the game's predefined rooms, players may create either custom rooms, where they tailor the game settings and choose from all of the available word lists, or chat rooms.

== Moderation ==
In most circumstances, the rules forbid players from writing letters or words in the puzzle, using various forms of code to spell out the words, etc. Established iSketch users (players who have been on the site for a predetermined amount of time) are given the ability to help moderate the game in order to ensure fairness and adherence to the rules. Players who see the artist writing or drawing inappropriately may vote against the player, and if enough votes are sent, the artist is skipped and any points gained from the round are cancelled. Players may also report other players for cheating or engaging in inappropriate behavior.

Administrators are notified whenever votes are cast and behavior reports are sent for site-provided rooms. They may monitor games visibly or invisibly, and may choose to support the vote by kicking offensive players out of the game or even banning them from the site. Alternatively, an administrator can also suspend a player's ability to vote if he/she feels it is being abused. Users who create their own rooms have full administrative powers in those rooms, similar to IRC Operators.
