= The Joker's Wild =

American television game show

- Also known as: Joker! Joker!! Joker!!! (1979–1981); Snoop Dogg Presents: The Joker's Wild (2017–2019)
- Created by: Jack Barry
- Directed by: Richard S. Kline; D.A. Diana; Rich DiPirro
- Presented by: Jack Barry; Jim Peck; Bill Cullen; Pat Finn; Snoop Dogg; Howie Mandel
- Announcer: Johnny Jacobs; Jay Stewart; Charlie O'Donnell; Ed MacKay; Dave Burchell
- Theme music composer: Perrey and Kingsley; Hal Hidey; Alan Thicke; Joe Manolakakis
- Opening theme: "The Savers" by Perrey and Kingsley (1972–74; 1977–78)
- Country of origin: United States
- Original language: English
- No. of seasons: 3 (CBS; 1972–75); 9 (syndication; 1977–86); 1 (weekly syndication 1979–80); 1 (syndication; 1990); 2 (TBS/TNT; 2017–19)
- No. of episodes: 686 (CBS); 130 (syndication; 1990); 30 (TBS/TNT)

Production
- Producer: Justin Edgerton; Ron Greenberg; Gary Cox; Allen Koss; Eric Warner
- Running time: 25 minutes
- Production companies: Jack Barry Productions (1972–1975, 1977–1986 (copyright only), 1990–1991); Barry & Enright Productions (1977–1986); Kline & Friends, Inc. (1990–1991); Sony Pictures Television (2017–2019, 2027); Snoopadelic Films (2017–2019); SMAC Entertainment (2017–2019); Studio T (2017)

Original release
- Network: KTLA
- Release: 1971 – 1971
- Network: CBS
- Release: September 4, 1972 – June 13, 1975
- Network: Syndication
- Release: September 5, 1977 – May 23, 1986
- Release: September 10, 1990 – March 8, 1991
- Network: TBS
- Release: October 24, 2017 – June 17, 2018
- Network: TNT
- Release: January 23 – March 27, 2019

The Joker's Wild is an American television game show that aired at different times between 1972 and 2019. Contestants answer trivia questions based on categories determined randomly by a mechanism resembling a slot machine. The show's title refers to the game's slot-machine mechanism also having jokers, which may be used to represent any category.

The show was billed as "the game where knowledge is king and lady luck is queen", and was notable for being the first successful game show produced by Jack Barry after his company's role in the quiz show scandals during the late 1950s. The success of the series led in part to the reformation of Barry & Enright Productions in the 1970s, which reunited Barry with his partner Dan Enright. It aired on CBS from 1972 to 1975, and from 1977 to 1986 in broadcast syndication. A children's version, titled Joker! Joker!! Joker!!!, aired from 1979 to 1981, also in syndication. Barry also served as host of The Joker's Wild until just before his death in 1984, and was replaced by Bill Cullen afterward. Jim Peck also filled in for both Barry and Cullen at various points.

Barry's sons, Jonathan and Douglas Barry, were co-executive producers for a revival of the series that aired in 1990 and 1991, which was produced in association with Richard S. Kline and billed as "a Kline and Friends production in association with Jack Barry Productions". Pat Finn hosted this version of the show. The series returned in 2017 on TBS, with Snoop Dogg as host, appropriately titled Snoop Dogg Presents The Joker's Wild. He was also co-executive producer with Michael Strahan. In December 2018, it was announced that the show would be moving to TNT in 2019.

The show is once again set to return in fall 2027, with Howie Mandel serving as host.

== Personnel ==
Series creator Jack Barry hosted the show from 1972 to 1984.

Jack Barry, who created the show and eventually used it to revive his partnership with longtime producer Dan Enright, hosted all versions of the show up until his death in May 1984.

Barry was not the original choice to host, due to his past involvement in the 1950s quiz show scandals. As a result, Allen Ludden hosted the first two pilots for CBS. Barry hosted the local KTLA series in 1971, but CBS was still hesitant to let him host the network run in 1972. Tom Kennedy, Wink Martindale, and Ludden were the three top choices to host, but each was already committed to other shows (Kennedy was tied to Split Second for ABC, Ludden had just started hosting a revival of Password, and Martindale was to host Gambit, which premiered the same day as Joker on CBS). They even offered it to Dennis James, who had originally been the favorite to land the host job for the upcoming Mark Goodson–Bill Todman Productions' game show The New Price Is Right. When CBS agreed to a weekday daytime version of The New Price Is Right, Vice President of Daytime Programming B. Donald "Bud" Grant wanted 15-year Truth or Consequences host Bob Barker to host New Price instead of James. Barker originally said he would gladly host Joker, but Grant convinced him to take the hosting role on Price instead. With no alternatives after Grant pushed Barker to The New Price Is Right (a position he would hold for 35 years) and James was hired by Goodson to host a nighttime syndicated version of the same program, Barry was given the green light to host. Barry's contract, however, was only for sixty-five episodes (thirteen weeks, a standard run for a daytime game show).

By January 1973, with no complaints from the viewers or the network and good ratings, Barry signed a regular contract to host the program and continued in that role up to its cancellation in June 1975. Enright was brought on as executive producer of Joker during its final CBS season, and was mentioned by Barry himself on the program's final CBS episode.

In 1981, Barry hired Jim Peck to serve as a regular substitute host for when he was unavailable. Peck subbed for Barry several times between 1981 and 1984, and the original plan set forth by Barry and producer Ron Greenberg was to have Barry end the 1983–84 season as host, announce his retirement on the first episode of the next season, and hand the show over to Peck on a permanent basis. When Barry died of cardiac arrest in May 1984, Enright posthumously overruled his partner and selected Bill Cullen, who had just completed five months of hosting the cancelled NBC game show Hot Potato for the company, to take over the series. Cullen hosted for the final two seasons and Peck subbed for him for one week in 1986. Pat Finn hosted the 1990–91 version, and Calvin "Snoop Dogg" Broadus helmed the 2017–2019 version.

=== Announcers ===
Johnny Jacobs, a longtime friend of host Jack Barry, was the original announcer of The Joker's Wild. Jacobs served through most of its CBS run, with Johnny Gilbert and Roy Rowan filling in for Jacobs on occasion. When the series returned to first-run syndication in 1977, Jacobs, Gilbert, and Jay Stewart alternated the primary announcer position. Stewart became the exclusive announcer for The Joker's Wild (as well as for all Barry & Enright-produced game shows at the time) during the 1978–79 season; Bob Hilton and Art James were substitutes for Stewart for the 1980–81 season whenever he was unavailable. In 1981, Stewart was replaced as Barry & Enright lead announcer by Charlie O'Donnell, who announced for the remainder of the series' run. Johnny Gilbert filled in for O'Donnell on occasion.

Ed MacKay, a local Los Angeles radio DJ and one-time overnight news anchor at KNX radio, announced the 1990–91 revival.

=== Other personnel ===
Richard S. Kline served as the director on all incarnations of the show.

=== Music ===
The first two seasons of the CBS version, as well as the opening of the first season of the syndicated version, used "The Savers" by Perrey and Kingsley from their 1967 album Kaleidoscopic Vibrations: Electronic Pop Music from Way Out as the program's theme music. The final CBS season instead utilized an original composition, "Joker's Jive," composed by Alan Thicke; this was also used as the closing theme during the 1977–78 syndicated season. The second syndicated season introduced a brand-new music package by Hal Hidey, including a re-recording of "The Savers" that was utilized as the opening theme.

== Gameplay ==
=== Main game ===
Two contestants, one a returning champion, played. The challenger began the game by pulling a lever to set a slot machine in motion. The game's slot machine consisted of three slide projectors that had been modified to use discs loaded with slides for the categories and jokers, similar to the wheels used in ViewMaster toys. The discs were spun by electric motors, and unused categories were removed from the board by shutting off the projectors for those windows.

The wheels on the machine each contained five different categories, which were revealed to the contestants before the game, as well as jokers that could represent any category. After the wheels stopped, the contestant chose one of the displayed categories and was asked a question in it. If the contestant answered correctly, the dollar value of the question was added to their score. An incorrect response or a failure to answer within an unspecified time limit allowed the opponent a chance to answer and steal the money. Certain special categories gave the contestant in control a chance to win extra money, by either increasing the question value or allowing multiple questions on that turn, or involved the participation of both contestants.

==== Question values ====
The values of the questions were determined by the spin. Categories were worth $50, $100, or $200 if they appeared in one, two, or all three windows, respectively. A correct answer on an individual category (a "single") awarded the contestant only $50. A "pair" (without a joker), if chosen, was played for $100. A "natural triple" (three of a kind with no jokers) required the contestant to answer a question in that category for $200.

In addition, beginning in 1974, spinning a natural triple awarded a bonus, which the contestant kept whether or not they answered the question correctly or won the game. The bonus initially consisted of a single prize worth approximately $300-$500, but by late 1983, it had been changed to a jackpot of prizes that increased in value after every show in which it was not won. Under these rules, the largest single jackpot award totaled $26,550, won in the 1983-84 season after going unclaimed for 46 consecutive days.

==== Special categories ====
- Mystery: This category was always played for double normal value ($100 as a single, $200 as a pair or $400 as a triple). The contestant selected one of seven numbered question cards in a rack mounted on the host's podium; each card was in a different category, none of which were the same as any of the other four in play.
- Pot Luck / Grab Bag: Questions could be about any topic, not necessarily one of the other four in play.
- Alphabet Soup: All answers began with the same letter of the alphabet, stated by the host at the start of the game.
- Stumpers: This category consisted of questions that were missed by both contestants in previous episodes. After the host read the question, the contestant could choose to hear the two previous wrong answers and play for the normal value, or decline the help and play for double value. When first introduced, this category consisted merely of straightforward questions and was played for an extra $100.
- Fast Forward: The contestant could answer multiple questions if desired, each worth the amount spun, and stop after any correct answer. Missing a question forfeited all money earned on that turn and gave the opponent a chance to claim the money for only that question.
- Bid: The contestant had to decide at the outset how many questions they wanted, with a minimum of two. Completing the bid awarded the full value of all questions answered (for example, three questions at $100 each awarded $300), but a miss gave the opponent a chance to take control with a correct answer and complete the bid themself. If the champion selected this category but did not bid enough questions to tie or surpass a challenger who had already reached $500, the champion immediately forfeited the game.
- Fact or Foto: The contestant could either hear one or more facts about a subject or see a photograph of it, then try to identify it. If they were wrong, the opponent got both the fact(s) and the photo.
- Just One More: Given a question with multiple answers, the contestants bid back and forth as to how many they could name. The high bidder won control; if they gave an incorrect answer, the opponent could steal the money with one correct response.
- How Low Will You Go?: A question and one clue were read to the contestants. Seven more clues were available, and the contestants bid back and forth as to how few clues they would need. The low bidder won control, but if they answered incorrectly, the opponent got to hear all the clues before responding.
- Take a Chance: After hearing the question, the contestant could either answer it or pass it to the opponent. An incorrect answer awarded the money to the contestant who did not receive the question.
- Choose the Clues: The opponent decided whether the contestant would receive one clue and play for double value, or two clues for the normal value. If the contestant was given only one clue and missed, the opponent got both clues and played for the normal amount.

==== Jokers ====
A three-joker spin, allowing the contestant in control to win the game by correctly answering a question in the category of their choice.

When one or two jokers came up during a spin, a contestant could use them to match any displayed category and create a pair or triple, increasing the value of the question. They could also substitute a joker for a category in play but not displayed on the wheels (referred to as going "off the board") for $50 with one joker showing, or for either $50 or $100 with two. In addition, if a natural pair and a joker came up, the contestant could discard the pair but use the joker to go off the board in that same category for $50.

Spinning three jokers allowed the contestant to choose any of the categories in play during the game. A correct answer automatically won the game, regardless of the contestant's score or whether a full round had been played or not. The winner received either $500 or the total amount they had accumulated to that point, whichever was greater. If unsuccessful, however, the opponent could not steal and the game continued as normal.

Using jokers was optional, and contestants occasionally declined to use them if enough money was at stake for their opponent to win the game or take the lead (e.g., spinning a natural pair and a joker, then playing the pair for $100 instead of turning it into a $200 triple). By playing this way, the opponent had less of an advantage if the contestant missed the question and the opponent answered it correctly.

==== Winning the game ====
The game was played in rounds, with each contestant guaranteed one turn per round unless the outcome of the challenger's turn made it unnecessary for the champion to take their own. The first contestant to accumulate $500 or more won the game and kept the money. If the challenger reached or surpassed $500 on the first turn of the round, the champion had one last chance to spin either three jokers or a combination that would tie or beat that score. Either contestant could win the game by reaching $500 with a correct answer to a question missed by the other, or by spinning three jokers and correctly answering a question in any category. If a round ended with the scores tied at $500 or more, the game continued until the tie was broken.

As was common practice on Barry & Enright’s productions during this period, champions received a new car after every fifth victory and remained on the show until they were defeated. There was one exception to this practice, though.

===== Winnings cap =====
During the CBS run, the show had a winnings cap of $25,000, the network's absolute limit at the time. At least one champion, Debbie Palmer, won exactly $25,000 and was retired after her sixth game.

At the time that The Joker’s Wild was airing in syndication, most syndicated programs had what was referred to as a “network of record”. This meant that one of the three major television networks at the time would subject the show to the same standards and practices that were in force for its own productions, even if the network was not affiliated with every station airing the program.

In 1981, CBS became the network of record for The Joker's Wild after Barry and Enright agreed to a contract for the show to be carried by some of the network's owned and operated stations. CBS, at the time, had a winnings cap for all of its game shows and it was enforced in one of two ways; one of these ways was for the champion to keep any winnings up to the limit and donate any overage to charity, which was employed by The Joker's Wild. After the 1983-84 season, Barry & Enright and CBS did not renew their arrangement and thus the cap on winnings was no longer necessary.

In the three years of the arrangement, one contestant was retired because of the limit. In 1983, clinical psychologist Joe Dunn appeared on nine consecutive programs and won 16 games, amassing a total of $66,200 in cash and prizes; his total was the highest in show history in regular, non-tournament play.

On Dunn's tenth and final appearance, Barry opened the program by explaining the rules set upon the show by CBS, including an agreed-upon cap of $35,000 in winnings. As Dunn continued to win games, Barry and the production staff went to CBS and requested that the limit be increased for him. During the negotiations, Dunn was allowed to continue playing after he passed $35,000 in winnings and was retired as champion after an agreement was made. CBS agreed to allow Dunn to keep $50,000 of his total winnings, and the $16,200 overage was donated to United Cerebral Palsy at his request.

=== Bonus Round ("Face the Devil") ===
The wheels now contained 12 slides displaying various money cards ($25, $50, $75, $100, $150, and $200, respectively), and one wheel contained a card with a picture of the devil. To win the bonus round, the champion had to score $1,000 or more without spinning the devil card, and as long as money cards appeared in all three windows on each spin, the total amount of the cards spun was added to the champion's running total, and he/she could either continue spinning and risk the money earned thus far or stop and take the money. If the devil card appeared during any of the champion's spins, the bonus round ended and he/she lost their money, but if the champion scored $1,000 or more without spinning the devil card, he/she won the money accumulated plus a prize package valued between $3,000 and $5,000. Spinning a natural triple was worth an automatic win, along with either $1,000 or the total in the pot plus the value of the triple, whichever was greater depending on the champion's total at that point (ex: if a contestant scored $850 and then spun a $100 natural triple, he/she won the bonus round with $1,150). Contestants who chose to stop and take the money were often allowed to take an unofficial spin to see if the devil would have come up next. For the 1974–75 CBS daytime episodes, as well as the first six syndicated seasons, the same prize package was at stake for the entire show until won, but this was changed to a different prize package in each bonus round for the final three seasons.

In late 1974 on CBS, a special "Lucky $100" symbol appeared on each of the bonus reels. If a contestant spun all three of these symbols in one turn, they won not only the prize package and the $1,000, but also a $3,000 cash bonus and a trip around the world worth approximately $7,000. The bonus increased by $100 per day until it was won or the combined value of the bonus and trip reached $15,000. After the extra prizes were claimed, the Lucky $100 symbols were removed and the bonus game reverted to its standard format. It was also during this time that audience members were selected to play the bonus game.

== Tournament of Champions ==
From 1977 until 1980, The Joker's Wild conducted an annual tournament of champions where contestants from the previous season returned to compete for an additional series of cash and prizes.

The format of the tournament matches differed in several ways from the regular matches. Each question was played for points instead of dollars, and each round was played to its conclusion to allow both participants an equal amount of turns; this meant that if the first contestant was to reach 500 points, even if he/she had spun three jokers, the opposing contestant would get one more spin to try and match or beat that total. The first to reach 500 or more points advanced in the tournament, and no Face the Devil round was played. Once the tournament was down to its final two contestants, they would face off in a best-of-three match to determine the champion.

The first tournament was held during the series' first season and featured sixteen former contestants that had appeared on the original series on CBS. Frank Dillon was the victor and earned a total of $50,000 in cash and prizes. He also earned an invite to the next tournament in 1978, which was conducted with eight of the highest winning contestants from the syndicated series to that point competing to face him in the final match; there, Dillon successfully defended his championship and won an additional $100,000.

1979's tournament was slightly adjusted. The field was still set at eight, with the penultimate match played as a best-of-three with the winner to face two-time defending tournament champion Dillon in a best-of-five match. Eileen Jayson made it to the final, where she defeated Dillon to win the top prize of $250,000.

The 1980 tournament featured a prize pool of $1 million, the largest in television history to that point. The field for the tournament consisted of the sixteen highest winning contestants over the course of the series at the time. Each of them was guaranteed a cash prize for competing, with the prize increasing depending on how far they advanced; the participants would receive half of that prize in cash, with the other half donated to a charity of choice.

Below is the prize structure.

- Eliminated in first (preliminary) round: $15,000
- Eliminated in quarterfinals: $25,000
- Eliminated in semifinals: $40,000
- Runner-up, finals: $200,000
- Winner, finals: $500,000

Rob Griffin won the tournament, and Cassandra "C.D." Dooley was the runner-up. They each received their share of the prize money as a ten-year annuity, and respectively donated the balance to the March of Dimes and Big Brothers Big Sisters of America.

== Broadcast history ==
In the late 1960s, Jack Barry pitched the concept of Joker to Goodson-Todman Productions. The company was not impressed, and Barry continued tinkering with the format over the next few years.

The Joker's Wild debuted on CBS September 4, 1972, incidentally on the same Labor Day when both the modern incarnation of The Price Is Right (which debuted after Joker) and the Wink Martindale hosted show Gambit (which debuted after Price) premiered. It ran until June 13, 1975, on that network, airing at 10:00 a.m. Eastern (9:00 Central). A total of 686 episodes were produced.

For the first two years, it faced NBC's Dinah's Place, the talk vehicle for singer/actress Dinah Shore, which gave way in July 1974 to the Dennis James revival of Name That Tune, which Joker easily defeated in the ratings. However, when NBC moved its panel game Celebrity Sweepstakes to 10:00/9:00 in January 1975, Joker went into steep decline, ending a nearly three-year run in the summer.

However, some big-market independent stations gave the game another chance the next year. After a syndicated rerun cycle of the last CBS season proved successful in 1976, the show returned in first-run syndication on September 5, 1977. The new series ran until May 23, 1986 and, beginning in 1978, would usually be paired with a syndicated revival of another Barry & Enright game show, Tic-Tac-Dough on stations carrying it.

Additionally, repeats of the CBS era were also seen on KTLA in Los Angeles from March 6 to September 8, 1978, in a double-run with the concurrent first-run syndicated episodes, replacing another Barry & Enright series, Hollywood Connection.

A second revival for syndication was one of five game shows sold to local stations for the 1990–91 season. Premiering on September 10, 1990, the new Joker ran into the same ratings trouble that the other four series did and was the third, following a revival of its sibling show Tic-Tac-Dough and The Quiz Kids Challenge, to be canceled before the end of the television season. The last new episode aired on March 8, 1991.

=== Taping locations ===
From 1972 to 1975, the program taped at CBS Television City. From 1977 until 1986—with the exception of the 1984–85 season, which taped at the Production Group Studios near Columbia Square in Hollywood—the taping location was moved to the La Brea Avenue studios of KCOP-TV. Taping returned to CBS Television City for the 1990–91 version. The 2017–19 version of the show taped at Sony Pictures Studios in Culver City, California.

== Versions ==
=== 1971: KTLA ===
A tryout series aired locally on Los Angeles' KTLA for about three months and was hosted by Jack Barry. The rules were similar to the 1972–86 versions with the following changes:

Three contestants competed in each game, with the champion spinning first to begin the game. Spinning three different categories and answering a question in any of the three categories was worth $25, while pairs were worth $50 and triples were worth $100. $250 was the goal to win, with an equal number of turns for each contestant. A three-joker spin resulted in an automatic win with a correct response to a question from any of the five categories in play.

In the event of a tie, play continued until one was ahead after each round. The bonus round was similar to that of the Ludden pilots but had more elaborate prizes.

Highlights of this version were shown during promos of the eventual series, which began production on CBS in 1972.

=== 1972–75 ===
For the first two weeks, triples were worth $150 and a three-joker spin resulted in an automatic win for a contestant without having to answer a question. From the premiere until around May 1974, the champion went first in each round; afterwards, the challenger did.

==== Bonus Round ====
The bonus round went through a few different iterations:

- Prize Round #1: The wheels were loaded with various prizes. The champion spun once and could either keep the prizes that came up, or decline them in favor of a second spin; in the latter case, they automatically received the prizes from that spin. Some prizes were marked with circles; if three circled prizes came up in a single spin, the contestant won a car in addition to those items. This format was only used on the first two episodes.
- Prize Round #2: Beginning with the third aired episode, the circles were eliminated and the car was added to the prize wheels, in addition to other high-value items such as boats and trips. This format lasted through the second week.
- Jokers and Devils: Beginning with the third week, the wheels contained only jokers and devils (see above for description). The contestant took up to three spins, receiving a prize of increasing value every time three jokers came up. If a devil appeared at any time, the round ended and they lost all prizes accumulated to that point. The contestant could end the round after any safe spin and keep the prizes they had won. Originally, the contestant was given up to four spins, with a large prize such as a car or trip at stake on the last one. For a brief period, the prize for a spin was not revealed until after the wheels had stopped. In 1973, to avoid confusion between the wheels used in the main game and bonus round, the jokers on the bonus round wheels were marked with the word "Joker" instead of the word "Wild".
- Face the Devil: Starting around May 1974, the "Face the Devil" bonus round described above had been implemented.

==== Joker's Jackpot ====
Early in the show's run, returning champions were competing for a chance to win the Joker's Jackpot, an accruing cash jackpot that started at $2,500. Contestants won this jackpot if they won three (originally four) consecutive games. After the "Jokers and Devils" bonus round stopped offering a fourth prize, a new automobile was added to the jackpot instead. After every game, the champion decided whether to play on for a chance to win the jackpot, or keep all their winnings and leave the show; however, if the champion decided to play on and was defeated, all of their cash winnings were forfeited to the jackpot, though prizes won in the bonus round were theirs to keep. The jackpot continued to build until it reached $25,000, which was at the time CBS's winnings limit for game show contestants.

Originally, after winning the Joker's Jackpot, the champion retired undefeated, but in February 1973 the rules were changed to allow champions to continue playing until either being defeated or reaching the $25,000 winnings limit. Once a champion won the Joker's Jackpot, that money (and the car, once it was added) was theirs to keep even if they lost a subsequent game.

Upon implementation of the "Face the Devil" bonus round, the Joker's Jackpot was discontinued. Contestants kept whatever they earned, while still retiring after winning $25,000, and received a car after every fifth victory.

==== Audience Game ====
An audience game was played beginning with the 1981–82 season. Three members of the studio audience were selected to win money and a chance to spin against the devil. Each audience member had one spin to get as much money as possible. The wheels contained money amounts ($10, $20, $30, $40, $50, and $100), with $300 the highest amount possible in one spin. All three audience members kept whatever totals they spun; the high scorer went on to play "Face the Devil" for a bonus prize and cash, using the same rules and dollar amounts as the onstage contestants. Ties were broken with an additional spin, and the tied members kept the money they scored on this spin in addition to their previous winnings.

When Bill Cullen began hosting in fall 1984, two audience members were chosen along with a home viewer who played by pressing a key on their touch-tone telephone to spin the wheels. The game was played onstage instead of in the audience as Barry and Peck had done to accommodate Cullen's limited range of motion on the stage.

When the audience game was first introduced, it was played at least once every week (usually on the Friday episode). Each audience member was allowed a maximum of two spins, and could either stop after the first or decline that score in hopes of improving it on the second. These rules were later changed to those described above, and the feature began appearing daily halfway through the 1981–82 season.

=== Joker! Joker!! Joker!!! (1979–81) ===
Joker! Joker!! Joker!!! was a special once-weekly version of The Joker's Wild, with Barry hosting, in which children competed with appropriately-themed subject matter. Prior to its debut, beginning in 1973, The Joker's Wild featured children playing every year around Easter.

The format was essentially the same, with some slight alterations. In the main game, the children played for points instead of money, with 500 points needed to win. The winning contestant received a $500 education bond, while the loser received a $100 bond. The special categories "Mystery" and "Fast Forward" were not used in this version, but "Multiple Choice" was. As before, full rounds were played, and the contestant who reached 500 points or more after each completed round won; if the score was tied at 500 or more, additional rounds were played to break the tie. A three-joker spin still was worth an automatic win with one correct answer from any of the five categories in play. More jokers were also added to the wheels, which Barry himself pointed out during one episode.

The joker cards contained a more juvenile-looking animated joker performing a handstand (with the word Joker written below the design), and the children played the "Face the Devil" round under the same rules as the adults on The Joker's Wild, except that members of their families joined them onstage for assistance. During the CBS era, the "Jokers and Devils" round was in play; however, prizes already won were not at risk when going for future prizes. Also, both the winner and loser got to spin for prizes; the loser got to spin one time, while the winner got to spin up to three times. Additionally, children were allowed to confer with their parents/relatives when choosing categories, but were required to answer questions themselves.

=== 1990–91 ===
Game play was changed dramatically when the series returned to syndication in 1990. In particular, the regular questions were replaced with terms that the contestants had to define. This version lasted only one season and was hosted by Pat Finn. A memorial plaque was placed on the slot machine as a tribute to Jack Barry, and the wheels were replaced by video monitors that simulated the appearance of spinning.

==== Format #1 ====
===== Round 1 =====
In the first round, three contestants (one a returning champion) competed to be the first to reach $500. The game began with a toss-up clue, and whoever buzzed in first with the correct answer gained control of the machine. The wheels contained cash amounts from $5 to $60 in multiples of $5, and the far right wheel also held a joker.

If the contestant spun only cash amounts, they were read a series of rapid-fire clues and had to identify the subject to which each one referred. Each correct response awarded the total showing on the wheels, but a miss or a failure to respond within three seconds allowed either opponent a chance to buzz in and steal both the money and control of the next spin. If the joker came up, the contestant had 15 seconds to answer as many clues as possible, each one worth triple the total on the other two wheels. A miss immediately forfeited any remaining time and gave the opponents a chance to steal, while answering every clue correctly (including any that might be in play when time ran out) allowed the contestant to keep control. If no one answered a clue correctly, control reverted to the contestant who had spun last.

The round ended as soon as any contestant reached or exceeded $500, and the low scorer was eliminated from the game and received parting gifts.

===== Round 2 =====
The two remaining contestants retained their scores from Round 1, and the high scorer had initial control. For this round, the dollar values ranged from $10 to $75 in multiples of $5, and the contestant chose one of two categories after spinning. Play proceeded as in Round 1, with one change: if an "Opponent's Choice" card came up on the far right wheel, the opponent selected the category for that turn.

The first contestant to reach or exceed $2,000 won the game, kept the money, and became champion. The losing contestant left with parting gifts.

==== Format #2 ====
On January 7, 1991, the front game format was reworked to incorporate elements of the version hosted by Jack Barry and Bill Cullen. Although the game was still played with the definition format, the wheels were loaded with categories and jokers and the contestant in control selected a displayed category after spinning. Correct answers awarded $25, $50, or $100 for a single, pair, or triple respectively. As in the first format, a miss or failure to respond gave either opponent a chance to buzz in and steal the money and control. Spinning three jokers immediately added $250 to the contestant's score, set the question value at $100, and revealed a category in each window for them to choose on that turn. It was possible for the same category to appear on more than one wheel after such a spin.

The options to discard jokers or go off the board with them were removed; if one or two came up on a spin, they all had to be matched to a displayed category. In addition, no bonus was awarded for spinning a natural triple.

The winning score for Round 1 was increased to $1,000, while $2,000 was still needed to win Round 2 and the game. A new set of categories was loaded onto the wheels for Round 2. The pace of gameplay was changed to allow games to straddle between episodes, if an episode ended without enough time to play the bonus round.

==== Tiebreaker ====
In both formats, a second-place tie at the end of Round 1 was resolved by allowing each contestant to answer as many clues unopposed as they could, with their turn ending at the first miss. The contestant who gave more correct answers advanced to Round 2.

==== Bonus Round ====
The champion had 60 seconds to identify as many words as possible, all starting with the same letter of the alphabet. The host read a maximum of three definitions per word, and the champion could offer multiple guesses at any time without penalty. The host would only move on to a new word once the contestant either identified the current one or passed after hearing its last definition. Each correct response awarded one spin of the machine, whose wheels were now loaded with prizes, jokers, and cash amounts. After each spin, the champion could freeze one or more wheels, putting them out of play for the rest of the round. If one or two jokers came up, they had to be matched immediately to a displayed prize.

If the champion got the same prize showing on all three wheels before running out of spins, they won it. If three jokers came up in a single spin, the champion won the Joker Jackpot, a cash award that started at $5,000 and increased by $500 every day it went unclaimed. The largest Joker Jackpot won was $36,000 in 1991.

==== 1990s audience game ====
As in the Barry/Cullen version, the revival gave audience members a chance to win money, but only in situations where a game ended sooner than expected. One audience member at a time was chosen to spin the machine up to three times, under the same rules as the bonus round. They won $100 for getting three of the same prize or three Jokers, or a Joker's Wild T-shirt for failing to do so.

==== Final week change ====
During the final first-run week of this version (March 4–8, 1991), the format reverted to the original format without categories.

=== 2017 ===
On May 17, 2017, it was announced that TBS would reboot the show with Calvin "Snoop Dogg" Broadus acting as host and serving as the executive producer along with Michael Strahan appropriately titled here as Snoop Dogg Presents The Joker's Wild. The revival premiered on October 24, 2017. In January 2018, the show was renewed for a second season. On December 21, 2018, Broadus announced that the show would be moving to fellow WarnerMedia network TNT starting with its third season premiering in 2019. Jeannie Mai served as hostess in the first season. Beginning in the second season, there is no co-host.

Each episode is self-contained, with no straddling games or returning champions. The front game consists of two rounds, each of which uses a separate set of five categories. Both contestants receive four spins in the first round and three in the second. In the first round, singles, pairs, and triples are worth $100, $200, and $300 respectively; spinning three jokers earns the contestant a separate question worth $500. Dollar values are doubled for the second round, with the trailing player or, in case of a tie, the player that went last, spinning first. Jokers may not be used to go off the board, but must be matched to a displayed category, and the game can end early if one contestant attains an insurmountable lead. If one contestant misses a question, their opponent is not given a chance to steal. If the scores are tied after two rounds, each player takes one last spin and the high scorer becomes the champion.

In the second season, the game is played in three rounds. Both players get two spins in each round, with all values doubled for the second round and tripled for the third. New categories are only introduced at the start of the second round. Additionally, in the third round, a player may challenge their opponent to answer the question ("Slang That Thang"); the opponent receives the money with a correct response, while the player scores on a miss. If the scores are tied after three rounds, each player chooses one of three face-down cards and the one with the higher draw becomes the champion; if the cards match, further tiebreakers are played until there is a winner.

The winner plays Face the Devil, with values from $300 to $1,500 and jokers worth $2,000 on the wheels. If the player either spins three jokers or accumulates at least $10,000 without seeing the Devil, their total is increased to $25,000 in season 1 or $50,000 in season 2, in addition to the money won in the main game. In season 2, the host occasionally offers extra cash in addition to the accumulated total as an incentive for the player to quit the round.

==== Gettin' Wild with Snoop Dogg ====
Prior to the shows' premiere, an all-exclusive six episode documentary series aired on the TBS app, TBS social media handles including the Facebook Watch tab along its very own website at TBS.com. Directed by Rory Karpf, the show chronicles Snoop Dogg's transition to a game show host as it explores his creative processes behind the show's reboot. The six episodes were posted on the official Facebook and YouTube page every Friday at 4:20 p.m. ET.

=== 2027 ===
On November 16, 2026, it was announced that the show would once again be rebooted for syndication, with Howie Mandel set to host the show. Production is set to begin in November 2026, with the show itself premiering in fall 2027.

== Merchandise ==
Board-game manufacturer Milton Bradley produced three editions of The Joker's Wild home game from 1973 to 1975, as well as a kids’ version of Joker! Joker!! Joker!!! in 1979. The standard editions of the game included the “Jokers and Devils” bonus round, while the kids’ edition replicated the “Face the Devil” bonus.

Plans for an Atari 2600 and Mattel Intellivision version of The Joker's Wild were announced by The Great Game Company in 1983, but due to the video game crash of 1983, it was never released for either console.

In 1994, Philips produced two editions for its CD-i platform based on The Joker's Wild, licensed by Sony Pictures Entertainment, who owned the franchise at that point. These games featured television game show hosts and were based more or less on the first syndicated series, while the sets on both games resembled the 1990 version. Wink Martindale hosted the first edition, while Marc Summers could be found on a special "Junior" edition of the game. Charlie O'Donnell served as the announcer for both games. Martindale was among the first candidates to host the original series when CBS was still not entirely sold on Jack Barry as host, due to his involvement in the quiz show scandals of the 1950s. However, Martindale already chose to host Gambit, another of the three game shows that premiered on the same day in 1972 on CBS (The New Price Is Right also debuted that day). O'Donnell was an announcer on the series. The theme music in these games was a remix of the 1977–86 theme.

In 2003, a mobile game based on The Joker's Wild was released by Sony Pictures Digital Entertainment.

In 2005, 2007, 2008 and 2009, IGT released video slot machines based on the 1970s version of the show.

=== Snoop Dogg Presents: The Joker's Wild ===
A Snapchat video lens was released on October 18, 2017, where Snoop would dance in the lens next to the snapchat user who would act as the dancing joker. The lens features custom green screen footage of Snoop Dogg that was shot exclusively for the lens experience.

An online game was released on October 24, 2017, where fans of the show can play along via the TBS Android and iOS apps, or on TBS.com.

In 2020, a slot machine game based on the show was released by Everie.

== Episode status ==
The status of the KTLA series is unknown; only brief footage is known to survive through 1972 CBS promos.

For many years, only the third season of the CBS run was known to exist, as the first two seasons were presumed to be wiped due to network practices of the era (although CBS was far less prone to master tape wiping than ABC and NBC).

In 2000, a search of New York's WCBS-TV found the original master tapes of both the first two seasons (restoring the full 686-episode run of the original CBS daytime series) and the entire series of Spin-Off (which replaced Joker in 1975) in a tape storage room.

A clip from a January 1974 celebrity week was used during the network's anniversary special CBS At 75. This version of the show is currently held by Sony Pictures Television & CBS Television Distribution.

The 1977–1986 syndicated episodes exist, and were rerun (with the exceptions of the 1980–81, 1981–82, 1983–84, and 1984–85 seasons) on Game Show Network, as were the first few months of the CBS era.

USA Network reran episodes of the Cullen era from April 1985 to April 1987. The network also aired the 1990 revival from December 30, 1991 to September 11, 1992 and March 29, 1993 to June 24, 1994.

In 2006, Sony Pictures Television and King World attempted to develop a new version for syndication, paired with a new show called Combination Lock; however, neither project was picked up. On December 4, 2023, Wink Martindale uploaded a run-through for this version, hosted by producer Mark Maxwell-Smith and featuring Charlie O'Donnell as announcer, to his YouTube channel.
