= 3rd Degree (game show) =

- Genre: Game Show
- Created by: Bert Convy; Burt Reynolds
- Directed by: Richard S. Kline
- Presented by: Bert Convy
- Announcer: Bob Hilton
- Country of origin: United States
- Original language: English
- No. of episodes: 195

Production
- Executive producers: Richard S. Kline; Burt Reynolds; Bert Convy
- Producer: Burt Wheeler
- Camera setup: Multi-camera
- Running time: 22–24 minutes
- Production companies: Kline and Friends Productions; Burt and Bert Productions; Lorimar Television

Original release
- Network: Syndication
- Release: September 11, 1989 – June 8, 1990

3rd Degree! is an American game show that aired in syndication from September 11, 1989, to June 8, 1990, with repeats continuing until September 7, 1990. The show was a panel game much in the vein of an earlier game show called Make the Connection, where two people with a specific connection would play against the panel.

3rd Degree was hosted by Bert Convy, who co-created and produced the series along with his production partner Burt Reynolds. Bob Hilton was the announcer, with Don Morrow and Michael Hanks substituting for brief periods. The series was taped at Television City Studios in Hollywood, California. John C. Mula was the art director.

3rd Degree was a production of Burt and Bert Productions and Kline & Friends Productions, the same team behind the game show Win, Lose or Draw. The series was produced in association with Lorimar Television and distributed by Warner Bros. Television Distribution. This was the last game show Convy would host, as he was diagnosed with an aggressive form of brain cancer toward the end of 3rd Degree's run and died in July 1991.

== Premise ==
A panel of four celebrities who were split into two teams (two men, two women) faced a team of two or more contestants who have a special relationship between them. Two rounds were played for each civilian team; in each round, each team of celebrities had a limited time to question the contestants (or give them "the third degree", hence the name of the show). In the first round, each team of celebrities had one minute to question the contestants, and in the second round, the time was cut to 30 seconds.

When the time was up, the celebrity team in control then got to guess the relationship (or when Bert Convy asked the question, "What's the relationship?" when they were getting close to the correct relationship). An incorrect guess awarded $250 to the contestants, and stumping the panel completely won $2,000 total, which includes a $1,000 bonus.

== Notable contestants ==
- I Love Lucy writers Madelyn Pugh Davis and Bob Carroll, Jr. appeared as contestants on the show's premiere, and successfully stumped the panel to win the $2,000 top payoff.
- Later in the premiere week, famed film composers Richard M. Sherman and Robert B. Sherman appeared as contestants and completely stumped the panel, who failed to identify them as having written "Supercalifragilisticexpialidocious" (from the 1964 Disney film Mary Poppins).
- Michael Burger, then host of Straight to the Heart, and David Ruprecht of Supermarket Sweep appeared on the show as contestants.
- Don Messick and Lucille Bliss appeared as contestants on the show, and the panel knew after the first minute that they were voice actors from the Smurfs. Don and Lucille had to settle for parting gifts on the show, but did the voices of Papa Smurf and Smurfette, respectively, when heading off to a commercial break.
- Henry Corden and Jean Vander Pyl were featured as contestants, with the panel successfully identifying them as the voices of Fred Flintstone and Wilma from The Flintstones, respectively. The panel figured out their relationship halfway through the second round, after the pair had won $500.
- Thurl Ravenscroft, who did the voice of Tony the Tiger for Frosted Flakes cereal commercials, was a contestant on the show, and he and his teammate stumped the panel and won $2,000.
- Betty Ann Bruno and Joan Kenmore, both of whom played Munchkins in the classic 1939 film The Wizard of Oz when they were children, appeared as contestants in 1990.
- Sergio Aragones and two other MAD Magazine cartoonists appeared on the program.

== Dispute ==
When 3rd Degree went to pilot, Peter Marshall was brought in to be the host. After the series was picked up for syndication, however, co-producer Bert Convy decided to leave his position as the host of the syndicated edition of Win, Lose or Draw and take Marshall's place on 3rd Degree without informing Marshall. Marshall filed a lawsuit against Convy for the action, but later dropped it after Convy's cancer diagnosis was made public.
