= Break the Bank (1985 game show) =

- Genre: Game show
- Created by: Richard S. Kline
- Written by: Kim Kapin; Rob Lloyd; Bruce Starin; Bruce Sterten
- Directed by: Richard S. Kline
- Presented by: Gene Rayburn; Joe Farago
- Starring: Kandace Kuehl; Julie Hayek
- Announcer: Michael Hanks
- Theme music composer: Hal Hidey
- Country of origin: United States
- No. of episodes: Approximately 180

Production
- Executive producer: Richard S. Kline
- Producer: Gary Cox
- Production locations: Hollywood Center Studios; Hollywood, California
- Running time: 24 minutes
- Production companies: Kline and Friends; Storer Communications; Hubbard Broadcasting; Blair Entertainment

Original release
- Network: Syndicated (daily)
- Release: September 16, 1985 – May 23, 1986

Break the Bank is a game show created by Richard S. Kline. It aired in syndication from September 16, 1985, to May 23, 1986, with repeats airing until September 12. It was not related to two previous shows by the same name.

The series debuted with Gene Rayburn as host, with Joe Farago taking over in December 1985. Kandace Kuehl was the co-host for the first three shows and was then replaced afterward with the 1983 Miss USA winner Julie Hayek. Voice-over artist Michael Hanks was the announcer.

Originally, Rayburn was supposed to host a revival of Match Game, in order to be paired up with The Price Is Right hosted by Tom Kennedy, but it was scrapped and reruns of the 1979–82 daily version aired in its place instead.

Break the Bank was the first game show produced by Kline's production company Kline & Friends. Kline and many of the show's production staff members had previously worked for Barry & Enright Productions, which had seen significant changes made after company founder Jack Barry died in 1984. Kline and his staff broke away from the company in protest against changes made by co-owner Dan Enright shortly thereafter.

== Format #1 ==
Two couples, one of whom was typically the returning champions, competed.

The object of the game was to solve a series of puzzles with six clues each. The host asked a series of toss-up questions whose answers served as the clues to the puzzle's subject. A correct answer awarded time and a chance to guess the puzzle, while a miss gave the opponents a chance to answer. If neither team answered correctly, the answer was put on the board and the game continued with the next question. The couple who gave the correct answer could choose not to guess the puzzle, as an incorrect guess would lock them out of the next question.

The first question of a puzzle awarded five seconds, followed by 10, 20, 40, 80, and 100 seconds for each of the next five. If neither team had solved the puzzle after the sixth clue, a seventh question was asked whose answer was the solution.

The first couple to solve two puzzles won the game and advanced to the Prize Vault in an attempt to break the bank. If both couples solved one puzzle, a third was played with no questions; the clues were revealed one at a time, and the first couple to solve it won the game and an additional 30 seconds.

The maximum potential time that a couple could accumulate was 540 seconds, obtained by answering every question correctly on the first two puzzles, solving one of them but not the other, and then winning the tiebreaker.

=== Prize Vault ===
The winning couple used their accumulated time to win prizes and "bank cards" by completing various stunts, such as answering riddles, identifying smells or noises while blindfolded, reciting a tongue twister, or hanging laundry on a clothesline while a large fan blew wind over them. Eight stunts were available per episode, each awarding a prize and card if completed; one gave a chance to win up to five additional cards. A total of 45 cards were available to new champions.

The couple began the round while standing at a lectern equipped with a card reader slot and chose a stunt, and one or both members (depending on the rules) ran to that station to play it. Completing it successfully allowed them to choose one card from a rack of five; they then returned to the podium and inserted the card into the slot to add the value of the prize to their total. One stunt was secretly paired with a random number generator called the Number Jumbler, which flashed numbers from zero to five. If the couple chose this stunt, an alarm sounded and one member had to run to the device and press a button to stop it, taking the displayed number of cards from a separate set of five. That member then inserted the cards into the slot on the podium and returned to the chosen stunt. The couple continued to choose and play stunts until time ran out. Originally, the clock ran continuously through the entire round; during the seventh week, the rules were changed to stop the clock while the host explained the rules of each new stunt. Cards acquired by completing stunts had to be inserted into the slot on the podium before time ran out in order for the couple to keep them and win the associated prizes.

Once time had expired, the couple took their cards to a vault cage and tried them in its key slot, one at a time. Each card generated a different six-digit code when inserted; one of the 45 cards would then generate the message "BREAK BANK!!", while the others displayed "WRONG CODE." During this portion of the round, the host would offer cash and/or prizes to surrender any untested cards after each failure to break the bank and would test them in the slot if the couple accepted. Breaking the bank awarded a jackpot that started at $20,000 in cash and prizes, including a car. For every day it went unclaimed, $500 cash and one or more prizes were added. When returning champions played this round, any cards they had previously used were put out of play and any they had sold back became available again.

Couples remained on the show until they lost the main game, accrued at least $75,000 in total winnings, or played the Prize Vault five times.

== Format #2 ==
The format was adjusted shortly after Farago took over as host.

The game was now played in three rounds, with the couples trying to earn cash instead of time. Questions were worth $100 in the first round and $200 in the second, and the couple who solved each puzzle also won a bonus prize.

In the third round, a series of toss-up puzzles worth $400 apiece were played, with no more questions. Clues were revealed one at a time, and the first couple to buzz in with the right answer won the money. The first couple to reach or exceed $2,000 won the game and advanced to the Prize Vault. Both couples kept their accumulated cash and prizes, and the defeated couple received consolation prizes as well.

Under this format, the maximum potential winnings total for the main game was $2,300.

=== Prize Vault ===
The stunt round was done away with in favor of the couple facing another puzzle. There were a total of six clues, which would be revealed one at a time in a clockwise manner. The clues were worth a total of 10 bank cards, and their individual values (one, two, or three) were shuffled until the couple hit a plunger to stop them. The couple received one bank card for winning the game, plus the cards associated with any unrevealed clues when they solved the puzzle.

Inside the Prize Vault were 40 bank cards, arranged on a rack. Thirty-eight of the cards awarded prizes or cash, one broke the bank, and one was a "Bankrupt" card that would immediately end the round and forfeit all Prize Vault winnings for that day. After finding any card that awarded cash or a prize, the couple could opt to stop playing for the day if they had not yet used all of their choices, with no cash/prizes offered by the host to do so as in the first format. In the case of returning champions, cards for already-won prizes were removed from the rack; however, the Bankrupt card was always in play.

Couples remained on the show until they lost the main game, played the Prize Vault five times, or broke the bank. Under this format, a car was originally offered as one of the 38 bank card prizes; it was later moved into the jackpot awarded for breaking the bank.

Under this format, the largest bank ever broken was worth $53,323.

== Winnings limit ==
During the first few months, couples stayed on the show until they won $75,000 or until they were defeated, with anything over $75,000 donated to a charity of the couple's choice. After the switch to the second bonus round format, couples were retired after successfully breaking the bank.

== International versions ==
Despite its failure in America, the 1980s Break the Bank found success in France as La Porte Magique ("The Magic Door") from September 14, 1987 until November 12, 1988 on the now-defunct network La Cinq ("The Five"). The series was hosted by Michel Robbe, and used a set similar to that of the American series with the original bonus round format for at least part of the run. The number of seconds earned per correct answer also used the 5-10-20-40-80-100 layout. Beginning on November 14, 1988, the series was renamed Ali Baba until its end on December 31, 1988.

In addition, a kids version of the series titled En route pour l'aventure ("On the road to adventure"), also hosted by Michel Robbe, aired from 1988 to 1991.

Country	Title	Broadcaster(s)	Presenter(s)	Premiere	Finale
France	La Porte Magique; Ali Baba	La Cinq	Michel Robbe	14 September 1987; 14 November 1988	12 November 1988; 31 December 1988

== Reruns ==
After being fired from the show 13 weeks into the run, Rayburn negotiated that his episodes would never be rerun. Only Farago's episodes have been rerun.

== See also ==
- Break the Bank (1948 game show)
- Break the Bank (1976 game show)
