= Pictionary (1997 game show) =

- Genre: Game show
- Directed by: Richard S. Kline
- Presented by: Alan Thicke
- Announcer: Joe Cipriano
- Country of origin: United States
- Original language: English
- No. of seasons: 1
- No. of episodes: 192

Production
- Executive producers: Richard Gill; Richard Kline; Robert S. Angel; Terry R Langston
- Producer: Richard S. Kline
- Production locations: CBS Television City; Los Angeles, California
- Running time: 22–24 minutes
- Production companies: Kline & Friends Productions; Pictionary Incorporated

Original release
- Network: Syndication
- Release: September 8, 1997 – June 12, 1998

Related
- Win, Lose or Draw

Pictionary is a half-hour American television game show which aired in syndication during the 1997–1998 season. The game was based on the board game of the same name where contestants guessed words and phrases based on drawings. Alan Thicke hosted the show with Joe Cipriano announcing. The series was a production of Kline and Friends and was distributed by Worldvision Enterprises.

Pictionary had a similar format to the earlier Win, Lose or Draw, which Kline's company also produced. The game mechanic was virtually identical, with two teams consisting of two celebrities and a civilian contestant competing.

The series was recorded at CBS Television City in Hollywood.

== Round 1 ==
Initially, both celebrities were each given two phrases to relay to their partners by drawing. There was a connecting word in both phrases (e.g., "Red Necks, White Socks, and Blue Ribbon Beer" and "Little Red Riding Hood," "red" being the connector). If they were both successfully guessed, the civilian contestant won $200. After both teams had taken a turn, a second set of phrases was played.

Later in the series' run, the round was modified slightly. This time, the celebrities drew as many phrases as they could in the time limit of 45 seconds and each correct guess paid off at $100.

== Round 2 ==
Players took turns drawing a series of puzzles for three minutes. This time, each puzzle had a different connecting word. Correct answers were worth $100, and if the team was stumped the player at the drawing board could pass the marker off to one of his/her teammates. The team in the lead played first, followed by the opposing team.

The team with the most money at the end of the round won the game and advanced to the bonus round. If both teams were tied, Thicke would draw a tie-breaking puzzle, with the first team to answer correctly becoming the winner. Regardless, both teams kept their money.

== Bonus round ==
In the bonus round, one team member was selected by his teammates to draw single-word puzzles instead of phrases for this 90-second round. Each word was connected to the word before it in chain fashion, such as Peanut-Butter-Bread-Basket-etc.

The first four (originally three) words were worth $100 each. The next three that followed would be worth $300. Every word after that was worth an additional $1,000. Play stopped when the timer ran out and the civilian player won whatever money the team had accumulated.

Originally, there were returning champions, who remained on the show until they were defeated or reached the Friday show of any given week (due to weeks airing out of sequence from when they were taped). Within two months, however, they were dropped altogether, and two new contestants competed on each show.

== See also ==
- Pictionary
- Pictionary (1989 game show) - There was an early child version of Pictionary during the late 1980s, but with different rules.
- Pictionary (2022 game show) - A version hosted by Jerry O'Connell, has its own rules different from both of its predecessors.
- Win, Lose or Draw, a similar game show also produced by Richard S. Kline.
