= Susan Slade =

1961 film by Delmer Daves

- Directed by: Delmer Daves
- Screenplay by: Delmer Daves
- Based on: The Sin of Susan Slade; 1961 novel by Doris Hume
- Produced by: Delmer Daves
- Starring: Connie Stevens; Troy Donahue
- Cinematography: Lucien Ballard
- Edited by: William H. Ziegler
- Music by: Max Steiner
- Distributed by: Warner Bros. Pictures
- Release date: November 8, 1961
- Running time: 116 minutes
- Country: United States
- Language: English
- Box office: $2.5 million (US/Canada)

Susan Slade is a 1961 American Technicolor drama film directed by Delmer Daves and starring Troy Donahue, Connie Stevens, Dorothy McGuire and Lloyd Nolan. Based upon the 1961 novel The Sin of Susan Slade by Doris Hume, concerns a well-to-do teenage girl who secretly has a baby out of wedlock. With cinematography by Lucien Ballard, the film was released by Warner Bros. Pictures.

It was the third collaboration between Donahue and Daves.

== Plot ==
After working for ten years in an isolated desert in Chile, mine manager Roger Slade (Lloyd Nolan) returns to the United States with his wife Leah (Dorothy McGuire) and their beautiful but naive 17-year-old daughter, Susan (Connie Stevens). During the journey, Susan has a shipboard romance with Conn White (Grant Williams), a wealthy young mountain climber. Susan and Conn make love in secret and plan to marry, but Conn wants to hold off making any announcement to their families until after he returns from his scheduled trip to Alaska to climb Mount McKinley (Denali). He travels on to Anchorage, while Susan and her parents go to Monterey and move into a home provided by Roger's grateful employer and longtime friend, Stanton Corbett (Brian Aherne). Roger has a serious heart condition which he has kept from his wife and daughter so as not to worry them; he has confided only in Stanton, who gave him a house, laboratory and life income so that Roger could rest and recover while giving his wife and daughter social opportunities.

Susan waits eagerly for letters from Conn, but he does not write and the one time he calls, she is out and misses the call. She soon discovers that she is pregnant with Conn's child, but keeps this a secret while urgently trying to contact Conn. Her parents attempt to take her mind off Conn by encouraging her to date the Corbetts' son Wells (Bert Convy) and buying her a horse, which is kept at the stables run by Hoyt Brecker (Troy Donahue). Hoyt is shunned by the local community because his father, an executive with Corbett's company, was convicted for stealing from his employer, and later committed suicide in his prison cell. Compared to Susan's family and friends, Hoyt is relatively poor and lives on what he can earn from his stables (which have lost many customers due to the scandal involving his father) and as a struggling writer. Despite all this, Hoyt and Susan gradually become friends and he confides in her his determination to not run away in the face of local disapproval, but to instead become a renowned writer and redeem his family name.

Susan finally receives a telephone call from Conn's father, whom she has never met, informing her that Conn had told his parents of his love for her and that Conn died climbing Mt. McKinley. Susan has a breakdown and tries to drown herself in the bay, but is rescued by Hoyt. In her delirium, she lets slip to her mother that she is pregnant by Conn. Roger and Leah decide the only way to avoid disgrace and protect Susan is for the family to move to remote Guatemala, where Roger has been offered a two-year job running a mine. Susan can then finish her pregnancy and have her baby in secret, and Leah and Roger will pass it off as their own. All goes according to plan, but after the baby (named "Rogie" after Susan's father) is born, Susan has difficulty setting aside her maternal feelings and treating the baby as her brother rather than her son.

Roger's heart condition worsens due to the stressful work at the mine, and he suddenly dies. Leah, Susan and baby Rogie return to their Monterey home, which Susan is dismayed to find has now been fixed up by the unsuspecting Corbetts to give her an apartment of her own, separated from the baby's room. Hoyt and Susan, who have been writing to each other regularly, renew their friendship and Hoyt professes his love for Susan, but Wells Corbett also begins to court Susan and soon proposes. Leah pushes Susan to accept Wells' proposal, but warns her never to tell Wells or anyone else the truth about Rogie's parentage, for fear that Rogie, Susan and the family name will be disgraced. Susan is reluctant to marry anyone because she would not be able to be honest with her future husband, but finally decides to marry Wells, just as Hoyt sells his first book to a publisher and rushes to tell Susan the good news.

Hoyt and Susan argue over her decision to marry Wells, as Hoyt has a grudge against the Corbetts and also thinks Susan does not really love Wells. As they argue, baby Rogie accidentally sets himself on fire while playing with a cigarette lighter. Rogie is rushed to the hospital and the Corbetts, Slades and Hoyt all wait to hear the outcome. The doctor finally announces that Rogie will survive, but is seriously hurt and only his mother can see him. Susan, unable to hold back any longer, reveals that she is Rogie's true mother, which causes Wells to rescind his marriage proposal, although his father Stanton praises Susan for her honesty. However, Hoyt's feelings for Susan have not changed. Susan professes her true love for Hoyt, and they embrace.

== Cast ==
- Troy Donahue as Hoyt Brecker
- Connie Stevens as Susan Slade
- Dorothy McGuire as Leah Slade
- Lloyd Nolan as Roger Slade
- Brian Aherne as Stanton Corbett
- Grant Williams as Conn White
- Natalie Schafer as Marion Corbett
- Kent Smith as Dr. Fane
- Bert Convy as Wells Corbett

== Production ==
Film rights to the novel were originally bought by Edward Small who announced he intended to film it in February 1960. He subsequently sold the rights to Warner Bros. who allocated the project to Delmer Daves; he used Troy Donahue and Dorothy McGuire, who had just appeared in Daves' A Summer Place. (In the finished film, the theme from A Summer Place plays in the background during a scene where Susan and Conn embrace.) Filming started on 10 November 1960, with Bert Convy in his first significant role.

== Reception ==
Variety wrote that it amply illustrated Stevens' acting, but that it "weighs in as little more than a plodding and predictable soap opera" and the "yarn has a chicken way of evading its real issues by ushering in devastatingly convenient melodramatic swerves at key moments."

Film director John Waters later praised the film:

Susan Slade was a financially successful, critically panned, early Sixties teen melodrama that I remembered from my youth for the one big shock scene: Connie Stevens’ character’s illegitimate baby catches on fire. Excitedly fast-forwarding the taped-off-TV video to the burning infant, clutching my cheap camera like a guerrilla unit-photographer, I was shocked to see how fake the scene looked today. Now it was even more amazing. I realized Delmer Daves, the director, could be my new favorite auteur, a talent no one in the world had yet praised. If I could “high-concept” his movie in mock storyboards, much like Cliff-Notes or “coverage” prepared by assistants for lazy studio executives...I could advance the director’s reputation without ever having to force the audience to see his actual movies.

== See also ==
- List of American films of 1961
