= Don Morrow =

American actor (1927–2020)

- Born: Donald Gordon Morrow; January 29, 1927; Stamford, Connecticut, U.S.
- Died: October 27, 2020 (aged 93); Danbury, Connecticut, U.S.
- Occupations: Announcer, actor, voiceover artist
- Years active: 1949–2020

Donald Gordon Morrow (January 29, 1927 – October 27, 2020) was an American announcer, television presenter, and voiceover artist.

Morrow was the announcer for the 1950s game show On Your Way. In the 1960s, Morrow voiced the trailers for the first four movies made by Sergio Leone. He was the host of the ABC-TV game show Camouflage, which aired from 1961 to 1963. From the 1950s through the 1980s, Morrow either appeared on camera as a commercial spokesperson or provided voiceovers for numerous brands, from Sinclair Oil to True cigarettes to Ford vehicles.

In 1988, Morrow replaced announcer Jay Stewart on NBC's Sale of the Century, and remained there until it ended in 1989, when he started announcing Now You See It. He was also the announcer of The Challengers in 1990. In the 1990s, Morrow landed a job with film director James Cameron voicing commercials for the movie Titanic (1997). Morrow died in October 2020 at the age of 93.
