= Robert Angel =

American board game designer

- Born: Vancouver, British Columbia, Canada
- Education: Western Washington University
- Occupations: Board game designer, Non profit board member
- Known for: Pictionary

Robert Angel is a Canadian-born American board game inventor who created the word guessing game Pictionary in 1985. Since selling Pictionary, he has invented other board games and products. Angel later became involved with non profit companies.

== Career ==
In 1982, following his graduation from Western Washington University with a degree in Business Administration and while working as a waiter, Angel invented Pictionary. After work, Angel would gather with friends to play a version of the game that required each player to randomly locate a word in the dictionary, then sketch it for his teammates.

Two years later in 1984, Angel moved to Seattle and found his old notes on the game. After a few positive play tests with family he decided to go into the games production business. Angel compiled the original word list, and business partners Terry Langston and Gary Everson joined the company to design it. They produced the first 1,000 games in Angel's apartment.

Angel first published Pictionary in 1985 through Angel Games, they sold 6,000 copies in one year at $35 each.

They licensed the game in 1986 in a joint venture between The Games Gang and Western Publishing. Then in 1994, Hasbro took over publishing after acquiring the games business of Western Publishing.

In 2001, Pictionary was sold to Mattel. At that time they were in 60 countries and 45 languages, with 11 versions just in the US and a total of 32 million games sold worldwide.

Angel developed another game adult board game called ThinkBlot. While the game was not as successful as Pictionary, it was still a hit for 2 years.

Angel has also worked as a film and television producer on Finding Hillywood (2013) (aka Film Festival: Rwanda), the 1997 game show Pictionary, and It Snows All the Time in 2015.

== Personal life ==
Angel is the board president for Inspire Youth Project, an organization that provides emotional support programs and stability for children and teens affected by HIV/AIDS.

=== Published games ===
- Pictionary
- Pictionary: Hong Kong Golden Edition
- Pictionary: Party Edition
- Pictionary Junior
- ThinkBlot
