= Allen Institute for AI =

U.S. research institute for computer science

- Formation: 2014; 12 years ago
- Founder: Paul Allen
- Type: Non-profit research institute
- Tax ID no.: 82-4083177
- Location: Seattle, Washington, U.S.
- CEO: Peter Clark (interim)
- Key people: Chris Bretherton, Peter Clark, Yejin Choi, Oren Etzioni, Hannaneh Hajishirzi, Ani Kembhavi, Jes Lefcourt, Noah Smith, Dan Weld
- Website: allenai.org

The Allen Institute for AI (abbreviated Ai2) is a 501(c)(3) non-profit scientific research institute founded by late Microsoft co-founder and philanthropist Paul Allen in 2014. The institute seeks to conduct high-impact AI research and engineering in service of the common good. Ai2 is based in Seattle, and also has an active office in Tel Aviv, Israel.

== History ==
Oren Etzioni was appointed by Paul Allen in September 2013 to direct the research at the institute. After leading the organization for nine years, Etzioni stepped down from his role as CEO on September 30, 2022. He was replaced in an interim capacity by the leading researcher of the company's Aristo project, Peter Clark. On June 20, 2023, Ai2 announced Ali Farhadi as its next CEO starting July 31, 2023. On March 10, 2026, Ai2 announced that Ali Farhadi would be stepping down as CEO after 2.5 years in the role, to be replaced by Peter Clark, again in an interim capacity.

== Teams ==
- Aristo: Aristo is a flagship project of Ai2. Its original project goal was to design an artificially intelligent system that could successfully read, learn, and reason from texts and ultimately demonstrate its knowledge by successfully passing an 8th-grade science exam – the team achieved this objective in 2018. It was inspired by a similar project called Project Halo carried out by Seattle-based investment company Vulcan. The current focus of the team is to build the next generation of systems that can systematically reason, explain, and continually improve over time.
- PRIOR: The PRIOR team seeks to advance the field of computer vision by creating AI systems that can see, explore, learn, and reason about the world. The team released the open embodied AI platform AI2-THOR in 2016, supporting the training of AI agents in simulated environments. In February 2018, the team released the game Iconary as a demonstration of an AI that can understand and produce situated scenes from a limited set of icons.
- Semantic Scholar: Semantic Scholar tool is an artificial-intelligence backed search engine for academic publications publicly released in November 2015. It uses advances in natural language processing to provide features such as summaries for scholarly papers, contextual information about inline citations, and the ability to create libraries of papers and receive paper recommendations.
- AllenNLP: The AllenNLP team works on research to improve NLP systems' performance and accountability, and advance scientific methodologies for evaluating and understanding NLP systems. The team produces its own research as well as open-source tools to accelerate NLP research.
- MOSAIC: The Mosaic project is focused on defining and building common sense knowledge and reasoning for AI systems.
- AI for the Environment: These teams seek to apply artificial intelligence solutions to the prevention of poaching and illegal fishing in locations around the world, as well as environmental problems like climate modeling and wildfire management. The teams in this group include EarthRanger, Skylight, Climate Modeling, and Wildlands.

== Generative AI ==
Ai2 has been actively involved in the development of open-source artificial intelligence through the release of fully open large language models, datasets, and model training assets.

=== Olmo model family ===
On May 11, 2023, Ai2 announced they were developing OLMo, an open language model aiming to match the performance of other state-of-the-art language models. In February 2024, 1B and 7B parameter variants of the model were open-sourced, including code, model weights with intermediate snapshots and logs, and contents of their Dolma training dataset (a three-trillion-token English corpus drawn from web text, academic publications, code, books, social media, and encyclopedic sources), making it the most open state-of-the-art model available.

In September 2024, Ai2 released OLMoE, the first mixture-of-experts model in the OLMo family, developed jointly with Contextual AI. The sparse model has roughly 7 billion total parameters, of which about 1 billion are active per input token, and was trained on 5 trillion tokens. As with other OLMo releases, the model weights were accompanied by the training data, code, logs, and intermediate training checkpoints.

In November 2024, Ai2 released the second iteration of Olmo, OLMo 2, with the initial release including 7B and 13B parameter models. In March 2025, Ai2 released a 32B variant of OLMo 2, claiming to have released "the first fully-open model (all data, code, weights, and details are freely available) to outperform GPT3.5-Turbo and GPT-4o mini".

In November 2025, Ai2 released their Olmo 3 set of models (now styled with a lowercase "L" and "M"). These included the Olmo 3 Think (7 and 32B), Olmo 3 Base (7 and 32B), Olmo 3 Instruct (7B) and Olmo 3 RL Zero (7B). In December 2025, Ai2 announced an update to the 32B model, Olmo 3.1.

=== Tulu models and post-training recipes ===
In addition to the fully-open Olmo family of models, Ai2 has also developed Tulu, a family of instruction-tuned models and open post-training recipes that build on open-weights base models (e.g., Meta's Llama) to provide fully transparent alternatives to proprietary instruction-tuning methods. AI2 released the first iteration of Tulu in June 2023, with subsequent iterations being released in November 2023 (Tulu 2) and November 2024 (Tulu 3).

== See also ==
- Allen Institute for Brain Science
- Allen Institute for Cell Science
- Artificial intelligence
- Glossary of artificial intelligence
- List of large language models
