= Befudiom =

Board game

Merriam-Webster's Befudiom is a word game where teams are challenged to guess selected idioms by acting, shouting, drawing, or spelling them out.

Points are awarded when teammates guess the correct idiom. The number of points awarded for a correct answer is determined by rolling a traditional die numbered from one to six. The various ways of expressing the idiom (acting, spelling, drawing, shouting) are also determined by the roll of a separate die with icons corresponding to the various means of expressing the idioms.

The name "Befudiom" combines the words "befuddled" and "idiom," alluding to the game's root in mixed-up meanings. Idioms are phrases and slang terminology whose meanings cannot be understood when taken literally. These expressions, such as "holy cow" and "kick the bucket" carry meanings and cultural implications that only a native speaker would understand.

The game was invented by Wendy Hampton, a single mother from Atlanta, Georgia, who was looking to entertain her bored daughter. The idea of the game was pitched at a casting call for the national PBS show, Everyday Edisons. Everyday Edisons then documented the creation and overall evolution of the game.
