= Black Denim Trousers and Motorcycle Boots =

1955 song performed by The Cheers

Single by The Cheers
- B-side: "Some Night in Alaska"
- Released: 1955
- Recorded: 1955
- Genre: Pop
- Length: 2:10
- Label: Capitol
- Songwriter: Jerry Leiber and Mike Stoller

The Cheers singles chronology
"I Must Be Dreaming" (1955)	"Black Denim Trousers and Motorcycle Boots" (1955)	"Chicken" (1955)

"L'Homme à la moto"

Single by Édith Piaf
- Released: 1956
- Label: Columbia
- Songwriters: Jerry Leiber and Mike Stoller; French adaptation: Jean Dréjac

Music video
- "L'Homme à la moto" (French TV, 1956)

"Black Denim Trousers and Motorcycle Boots" is a song by Jerry Leiber and Mike Stoller. Recorded by The Cheers, it went to #6 on Billboard's Best Seller and Jockey charts in the fall of 1955, becoming Leiber and Stoller's first top-ten pop hit. Veteran performer Vaughn Monroe covered the record, going to #38 on the Billboard charts. The song also rose to a top-10 chart appearance on the Cash Box chart (which counted songs, not records, and thus counted all cover versions of a song as one). In 1956, French chanteuse Edith Piaf recorded a French translation of the song titled "L'Homme à la moto," which became one of her biggest selling singles.

The song tells the story of a motorcycle rider, described as "the terror of Highway 101," and his loyal but oft-neglected girlfriend Mary Lou. In the song she pleads with him not to ride one night: "I've got a feeling if you ride tonight I'll grieve" she tells him, but he ignores her and "hit a screamin' diesel that was California bound." When investigators arrive at the scene of the collision, they find no trace of the motorcycle or rider except for his clothes. Featuring a catchy tune and the chorus of "He wore black denim trousers and motorcycle boots and a black leather jacket with an eagle on the back," the song was the second big hit for the Cheers, after "Bazoom (I Need Your Lovin')." It was also the first song to chart about motorcycles and the "new" motorcyclists, earning it the reputation as the first biker song. Its popularity coincided with the death of teen idol James Dean in an automobile crash in the week following the record's release, and the disappearance and presumed death of the song's subject made the song an important forerunner of the teenage tragedy song phenomenon that emerged in the early 1960s.

The sound of a bell warning of an oncoming train at a railroad crossing can be heard in the song's middle and end.

This song is excerpted in the Buchanan and Goodman novelty single "Buchanan and Goodman on Trial" (1956).

This song was also recorded by Canadian group The Diamonds for the Coral Records label; the Diamonds later achieved fame later with "Little Darlin'." In 1994, Chris Spedding recorded a new version of the song. It has also been recorded by Joan Morris and William Bolcom, and has become a staple of their concert repertoire.

In 1959, Dodie Stevens became famous with her parody of "Black Denim Trousers," "Pink Shoelaces", which uses a different, less tragic storyline.

== French song ==
The text of "Black Denim Trousers and Motorcycle Boots" is adapted into French by Jean Dréjac, and entitled "L'Homme à la moto" : "It was the film The Wild One with Marlon Brando that inspired me, as well as all those young people in leather jackets who appeared in the suburbs," confides Jean Dréjac in 1963. The French lyrics are a literal translation of the original lyrics. Edith Piaf sang it for the first time at the Olympia in 1956.

The French version is covered in particular by Nicoletta, Vince Taylor, Renaud, Michèle Torr, Bernard Lavilliers, Mireille Mathieu, Florent Pagny, Brigitte Fontaine, Norma Loy and Beth Ditto.

== References and further reading ==
- Stan Cuesta. L'homme à la Moto: Le Chef-d'Œuvre d'Edith Piaf. (Paris: Scali, 2007).
