= Joe Farago =

American actor and stuntman (1948–2025)

Joseph Michael Farago (January 28, 1948 – March 23, 2025) was an American actor, stuntman, game show host, and television personality. His movie roles include The Terminator and The Abyss (directed by James Cameron) and The Rookie (directed by Clint Eastwood). Stunt work included Star Trek VI: The Undiscovered Country, and I, the Jury. Farago also costarred in Seinfeld, Married... with Children, and Coach.

In 1985, he replaced Gene Rayburn as the host of the game show Break the Bank, having previously appeared as a celebrity guest three times during the show's first two weeks. He hosted more than 160 episodes as well as the 1990-91 HBO comedy show Night Rap with guests including Timothy Leary, Ed Koch, G. Gordon Liddy and Mel Brooks.

Farago appeared as a host for QVC as well as acting/hosting roles and voice work for dozens of radio/TV commercials including McDonald's, GT Xpress, Xpress Redi Set Go, Q Grill The True Sleeper, T-Fal cookware and The Bissell Big Green Clean Machine. He hosted 35 infomercials seen in more than 70 countries around the world, topping over 1 billion in infomercial sales.

In 2001, after the September 11 attacks, Farago became a firefighter in Idaho. When asked why he left Hollywood to become a firefighter, Joe simply responded, ‘Well, I never pulled up to a burning building and had someone say, “Thank God, an actor showed up!"

As a member of a Type II incident management team, Farago deployed to Hurricanes Katrina and Rita and served as a Public Information Officer on several large western wildfires. Farago taught at the Florida Fire College and as a member of the Emergency Management Institute instructor team, involved in the Master Public Information Officer course pilot programs for FEMA.

With his experience as a radio news director, as well as careers in public relations and mass marketing, he was a mentor to many along his path.

Joe Farago was married to Sheri Farago, until his passing in Florida on March 23, 2025, at the age of 77.

== Filmography ==
Joe Farago Film resume included The Terminator (1984), The Abyss (1989), The Rookie (1990), Guilty as Charged (1991), Silent Rage (1982) and acting/stunt work in I, the Jury (1982) and Star Trek VI: The Undiscovered Country (1991).

Farago also appeared in television series such as Seinfeld (1991), Coach (1990) and Married... with Children (1989). He anchored the comedy series Night Rap from 1990-1991 and costarred in T. J. Hooker (1985). Other television appearances include Quantum Leap (1989), L.A. Law (1991), Adam-12 (1990), Perry Mason, From the Earth to the Moon (1998) and Knots Landing.

Year	Title	Role	Notes
1981	Raider Stone		
1982	Silent Rage	Emergency Room Doctor	
1982	I, the Jury	Assistant Director	Stunts
1984	The Terminator	TV Anchorman	
1989	The Abyss	Anchorman	
1990	The Rookie	Anchorman	
1991	Star Trek VI: The Undiscovered Country	Excelsior crewmember	Stunts
1991	Guilty as Charged	Packing Plant Manager	
