= Peter Kalivas =

American neuroscientist

Peter W. Kalivas
- Occupations: Neuroscientist, author and academic

Academic background
- Education: BSc., Biology; PhD., Pharmacology
- Alma mater: Western Washington University; University of Washington

Academic work
- Institutions: Medical University of South Carolina

Peter W. Kalivas is an American neuroscientist, author, and academic. He is a Distinguished University Professor in the Department of Neuroscience at the Medical University of South Carolina.

Kalivas has published research articles and books, focusing on neuroadaptations in addiction and stress, such as relapse mechanisms, comorbid PTSD, and therapeutic strategies using advanced experimental approaches. He is the recipient of awards including the 1993 Smith-Kline-Beecham Award for Research Excellence, the American College of Neuropsychopharmacology (ACNP)'s Daniel Efron Award in 1996, a 2001-2010 Merit Award from the National Institute of Drug Abuse, the 2008 Foundation IPSEN Neuronal Plasticity Prize, the 2011 Governor's Award for Excellence in Scientific Research from the South Carolina Academy of Sciences and the ACNP Julius Axelrod Mentorship Award in 2021.

Kalivas is a fellow of the American Society for Pharmacology and Experimental Therapeutics and past president of the American College of Neuropsychopharmacology.

== Education and early career ==
Kalivas earned a BSc in Biology from Western Washington University in 1974. He then enrolled at the University of Washington, and completed his PhD in 1980. That same year, he became a postdoctoral fellow at the University of North Carolina at Chapel Hill until 1982.

== Career ==
Kalivas continued his academic career as an assistant professor of Pharmacology at Louisiana State University Medical Center from 1982 to 1984. In 1984, he joined Washington State University, initially as an assistant professor in the Department of Comparative Anatomy, Pharmacology, and Physiology, later becoming associate professor in 1987 and Professor in 1991. From 1990 to 1998, he directed the university's Alcohol and Drug Abuse Program and was a Fogarty Senior Fellow in 1996. In 1998, he was appointed professor and chair of the Department of Physiology at the Medical University of South Carolina, where he co-founded and chaired the Neuroscience Institute (2000–2003) and later the Department of Neuroscience (2005–2019). Since 2005, he has held the title of distinguished university professor in the Department of Neuroscience. He has served as the director of the Kalivas Laboratory. Additionally, he has been named an honorary professor at Nanjing Medical University, the University of Cordoba, and Ningbo Medical University.

From 2006 to 2012, Kalivas was the founding editor of Neuropsychopharmacology Reviews. He held the presidency of the American College of Neuropsychopharmacology in 2014, and was on the board of directors for the American Brain Coalition from 2015 to 2020.

Kalivas co-organized the IBRO African Addiction School in Nairobi, Kenya (2018) and Rabat, Morocco (2022). He also co-directed an annual school on the neurobiology and therapeutics of neuropsychiatric disorders in collaboration with the African College of Neuropsychopharmacology, the American College of Neuropsychopharmacology, and the Brain and Mind Institute at Aga Khan University in Nairobi.

== Research ==
Kalivas has contributed to neuroscience by investigating dopamine regulation, behavioral sensitization to addictive drugs, neurocircuits involved in drug and stress relapse, the glutamate homeostasis hypothesis, and the role of astroglia and extracellular matrix restructuring in conditioned behaviors. He has served as the lead experimentalist and lab director for studies including over 400 peer-reviewed publications, over 120 editorials and book chapters and 6 books as editor. His research has received funding from the National Institutes of Health, and he directed a National Institute of Drug Abuse sponsored Research Center from 2003 to 2024.

=== Neuropeptide regulation of dopamine systems ===
Between 1980 and 1993, Kalivas discovered that administering neuropeptides such as neurotensin, CRF, and enkephalin into the ventral tegmental area (VTA) regulates dopamine transmission. He also revealed that daily stimulation of these peptide systems in the VTA induces behavioral sensitization, accompanied by enhanced dopamine release in the nucleus accumbens and prefrontal cortex. These findings provided insights into the role of neuropeptides in influencing addictive behaviors.

=== Biology of behavioral sensitization to addictive drugs ===
From 1987 to 1995, Kalivas characterized how addictive drugs act in the ventral tegmental area (VTA) to initiate locomotor sensitization and in dopamine terminal fields, particularly the nucleus accumbens, to sustain behavioral sensitization. His work established an anatomical distinction between the initiation of drug-induced plasticity in the VTA and the expression of plasticity in the accumbens, forming a foundation for subsequent electrophysiological studies on synaptic plasticity.

=== Neurocircuits regulating drug and stress relapse ===
Since 1996, Kalivas has focused on the neurocircuitry underlying reinstated drug seeking, displaying the critical role of glutamate transmission in the nucleus accumbens. He initially utilized microdialysis and pharmacological inactivation to explore glutamatergic circuitry and later incorporated advanced techniques such as optogenetics, DREADD technology, and Ca²⁺ imaging to map brain circuits regulating drug- and stress-induced reinstatement of cocaine seeking. This research was thereafter extended to heroin, nicotine, and cannabis seeking, consistently identifying the cortico-accumbens glutamate transmission as central to reinstated behavior. Additionally, he highlighted the ventral pallidum's role, particularly enkephalin co-released from accumbens D2 neuron afferents, and demonstrated functional D1 afferents into the ventral pallidum regulating cue-induced reinstatement using combined optogenetic and slice electrophysiology approaches.

=== Glutamate homeostasis and glial role in plasticity ===
After determining the role of glutamate transmission in reinstated drug seeking, Kalivas led research into the functions of glial glutamate transporters and antiporters in regulating synaptic plasticity at cortico-accumbens synapses. His group was the first to characterize the cystine-glutamate antiporter's role in controlling extracellular glutamate in vivo and observed that drug-induced downregulation of glial transporters (GLT-1) contributes to synaptic glutamate spillover during reinstated drug seeking. He also indicated that restoring glial glutamate transporter levels prevents glutamate spillover and inhibits reinstated cocaine, heroin, cannabis, and nicotine seeking, which led to his proposal of the glutamate homeostasis hypothesis of addiction. Moreover, his studies identified small-molecule drugs that restore GLT-1 function, including N-acetylcysteine (NAC), which he facilitated into clinical trials. In collaboration with clinical colleagues at MUSC, he showcased NAC's partial efficacy in reducing cravings for cocaine, cannabis, and cigarettes through pilot double-blind trials. To address the limitations of NAC in translating between animal models and human substance use disorder, his group introduced the use of nonlinear stochastic block modeling to evaluate multiple addiction-like behaviors simultaneously in rodents and better reflect the nonlinear evaluation of substance use disorder in humans.

=== Synaptic remodeling and tetrapartite synapses ===
Kalivas' team discovered that reinstated drug seeking and stress-cue reinstated stress coping behaviors are mediated by plasticity not only in traditional neuronal synapses, but also in astroglia and the extracellular matrix proximal to the synapse, a configuration termed the tetrapartite synapse. He found that the transient synaptic potentiation (t-SP) at cortico-accumbens and accumbens-pallidal synapses required for cue-induced relapse also required morphological changes in astroglial processes near synapses, as well as digestion of the extracellular matrix by matrix metalloproteinases (MMP) activation and signaling through integrin receptors.

== Recognition ==
2008 - 19th annual Neuronal Plasticity Prize, awarded by the Forum of the European Neuroscience Societies
2012 - South Carolina Governor's Award for Excellence in Scientific Research
2024 - College of Medicine Research Excellence Award
