= Pictionary =

Word guessing game

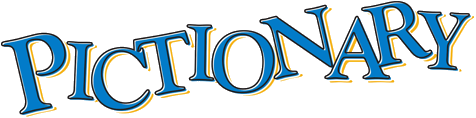

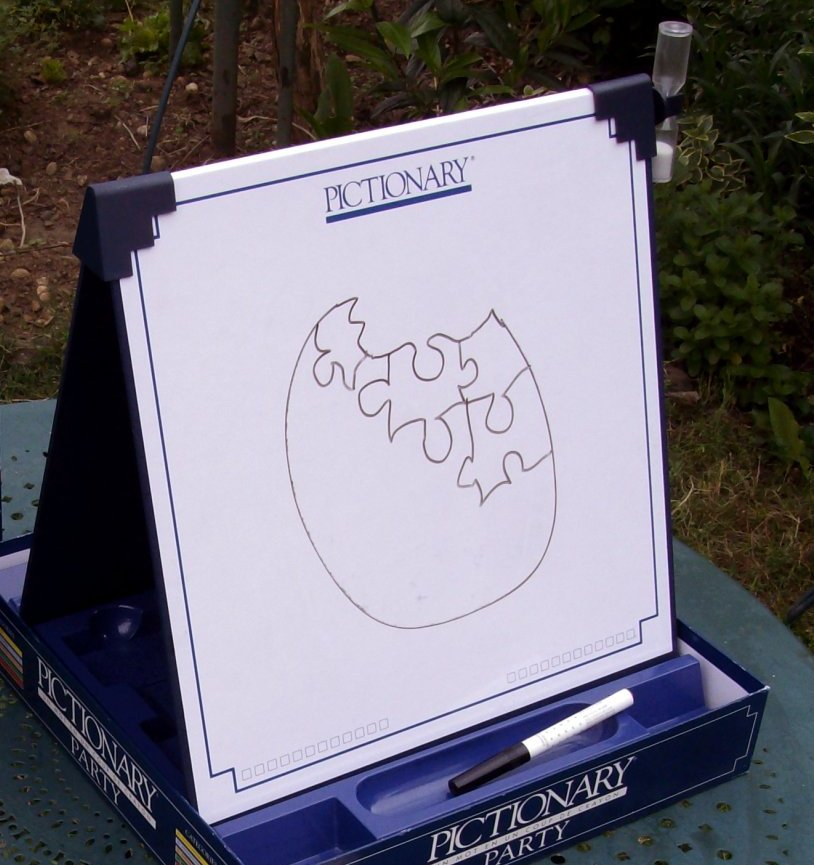
- A game of "Pictionary Party"
- Designers: Robert Angel
- Publishers: Angel Games; Western Publishing; Hasbro; Mattel
- Publication: 1985; 41 years ago
- Years active: 1985–present
- Genres: Board game
- Players: 3–16
- Setup time: <1 minute
- Playing time: 90 minutes
- Chance: Medium
- Age range: +12
- Skills: Drawing, image recognition, wordplay, vocabulary

Pictionary (/ˈpɪkʃənəri/, US: /-ɛri/, PIK-shuh-NER-ee) is a charades-inspired word-guessing game invented by Robert Angel with graphic design by Gary Everson and first published in 1985 by Angel Games Inc. Angel Games licensed Pictionary to Western Publishing. Hasbro purchased the rights in 1994 after acquiring the games business of Western Publishing. The game is played in teams with players trying to identify specific words from their teammates. Its name is a portmanteau of "picture" and "dictionary".

== History ==
The concept of Pictionary was first created by Robert Angel and his friends in 1981. Angel and his roommates came up with the concept of the game, which proved to be very popular between them. While originally hesitant to pitch the idea, Angel was inspired by Trivial Pursuit, the gameplay of which was similar to his concept and proved to him that such gameplay could work and be successful.

Angel and his business partners Terry Langston and Gary Everson first published Pictionary in 1985 through Angel Games. They gathered $35,000 and a thousand copies were printed. A week before Pictionary was first launched, Angel Games' printing company called to inform them that they could not sort through the 500,000 cards they had printed out. Angel and his partners had to sort through the cards themselves over the course of six days. They managed to sell 6,000 copies in one year at $35 each.

Angel Games licensed the game in 1986 in a joint venture between The Games Gang and Western Publishing. Pictionary's sales rose drastically the next year - during which it also started being marketed nationally. By the end of 1987, 3 million copies of Pictionary had been sold; the game's retail sales were worth 75 million dollars in 1987. It was rated the United States' second best-selling diversion in November 1987 by Toy and Hobby World magazine. Except a three-week national television advertising campaign, publicity for the board game was spread by word of mouth and news stories. By the end of 1988, nearly 10 million copies had been sold. By the end of 1989, 13 million copies had been sold.

In 1994, Hasbro took over publishing after acquiring the games business of Western Publishing.

At that time they were in 60 countries and 45 languages, with 11 versions just in the US and a total of 32,000,000 games sold worldwide.

== Objective ==
Each team moves a piece on a game board consisting of a sequence of squares. Each square has a letter or shape indicating the type of picture to be drawn. To advance to a new square, a player must guess the word or phrase being drawn by their partner. If a player lands on an "all play" square, one player from each team attempts to illustrate the same concept simultaneously, with both teams racing to guess first. The first team to land on the last square and guess correctly wins.

== Components ==
- A cardboard gameboard with 55 colored squares.
- A box full of cards, each with 5 or 6 subjects (depending on the version).
- Four playing pieces of different colors.
- Four notepads or two whiteboards.
- Four pencils with an eraser (for notepads) or two markers (for whiteboards).
- A one-minute hourglass.
- A die.

== Gameplay ==
Teams must first be formed; between two and four teams can be formed, with no limits on the number of player per team. Once formed, the teams must choose a colored playing piece. An odd amount of players may play; in which case one person always draws for both teams. Each team rolls the die, and the team with the highest roll plays first.

The team chooses one person to begin drawing ("the picturist"); this position rotates with each word. The drawer chooses a card out of a deck of special Pictionary cards, examine it for up to five seconds and tries to draw pictures which suggest the word printed on the card. The pictures cannot contain any numbers or letters, nor can the drawers use spoken clues about the subjects they are drawing. One may not point or gesture to an object. The teammates try to guess the word the drawing is intended to represent. A one-minute timer, usually a sand timer, is used to compel players to rapidly complete their drawing and guessing.

If the sand timer expires before the team guesses the word, the team does not advance and the turn passes to the team on the left. If the team successfully guesses the word, they roll the dice, advance and pick a new card. To win, a team must reach the Finish square on the gameboard and correctly guess the word in the ensuing round.

There are five types of squares on the board, and each Pictionary card has a list of five words printed on it. Players must then draw the word which corresponds to the square their playing piece landed on:

	Name	Subject
P	Person/Place/Animal	Self-explanatory. Includes proper names.
O	Object	Nouns - things that can be touched or seen.
A	Action	Verbs - things that can be performed.
D	Difficult	Words which are difficult to represent in a drawing.
AP	All Play	All the teams sketch and guess the word. The team that guesses first rolls the die, advance, and chooses a new word. If none of the teams guess the word, the turn passes to whichever team should have been next.
	Appears in certain versions.	Player may pick a card and choose which word they wish to draw.

== Television series ==
- Pictionary (1989 game show)
- Pictionary (1997 game show)
- Pictionary (2022 game show)

== Reception ==
Games included Pictionary in its top 100 games of 1986, saying, "The frequent All Play rounds, in which all teams try to identify the same word, are especially exciting. Artistic talent is not a requirement; ingeniously simple drawings almost always win. The 2,500 color-coded words provide real tests of imagination."

== Reviews ==
- Jeux & Stratégie #53
- Family Games: The 100 Best

== See also ==
- Befudiom, a game in which players guess idioms that are acted, shouted, drawn, or spelled out
- Charades, a game that inspired Pictionary, in which players act out words or phrases
- Draw Something, an asynchronous mobile game with a similar concept
- Fast Draw, a 1968 game show with a similar concept to Win, Lose or Draw and Pictionary
- iconary, a Pictionary-like online game where players partner with an AI player
- iSketch, a Pictionary-like online game
- Pictionary (video game), a video game based on Pictionary released for the Nintendo Entertainment System in 1990
- Win, Lose or Draw, a game show with a similar concept to Pictionary
