= Ron Greenberg =

American television game show producer (born 1940)

Ron Greenberg (born 1940?) is an American television game show producer who worked on numerous networks and syndicated programs of that genre from the 1960s through the 1990s.

His credits include Camouflage, Word for Word, Let's Play Post Office, Reach for the Stars, Dream House, Sale of the Century, The Money Maze, The Joker's Wild, Tic-Tac-Dough, Hollywood Connection, Play the Percentages, and Bullseye.

He packaged five games: The Who, What or Where Game (1969–1974); The Big Showdown (1974–1975); The Pop 'N Rocker Game (1983–1984); a remake of The Who, What, or Where Game titled The Challengers (1990–1991); and a remake of Let's Make a Deal (1990–1991).

Greenberg created and hosted a weekly quiz radio show on Shokus Internet Radio titled Anyone Can Play ... But Don't Call Us, We'll Call You. However, Greenberg has since relinquished hosting duties to game show veteran Larry Anderson.
