= Win, Lose or Draw =

American television game show

- Genre: Game show
- Created by: Burt Reynolds; Bert Convy
- Directed by: Richard S. Kline (NBC, syndication); Dan Diana (Teen); Jeffrey L. Goldstein (Teen)
- Presented by: Vicki Lawrence (1987–89, NBC); Bert Convy (1987–89, synd.); Robb Weller (1989–90, synd.); Marc Price (1989–92, Teen)
- Narrated by: Bob Hilton (NBC and Syndication); Dean Goss (substitute on NBC); Gene Wood (syndication); Brandy Brown, Chase Hampton, Tiffini Hale, Mark L. Walberg (Teen)
- Country of origin: United States
- Original language: English
- No. of seasons: 3 (Syndication); 2 (Teen)
- No. of episodes: 535 (NBC); 585 (syndication); 65 (Teen)

Production
- Executive producers: Burt Reynolds; Bert Convy
- Producers: Richard S. Kline (NBC, synd.); Jay Wolpert (Teen); Deborah Williams (Teen)
- Production locations: Television City Studios; Los Angeles, California
- Running time: 22–24 minutes
- Production companies: Burt & Bert Productions; Kline & Friends; Buena Vista Television

Original release
- Network: NBC (1987–89); Syndication (1987–90); Disney Channel (1989–92)
- Release: September 7, 1987 – September 26, 1992

Win, Lose or Draw is an American television game show that premiered in 1987 and ran in syndication and on NBC. It was taped at CBS Television City in Los Angeles and was created by Burt Reynolds and Bert Convy, who co-produced the series with Richard S. Kline for Buena Vista Television. The game was similar to Pictionary, a popular board game at the time. Reynolds, however, said that the game evolved from a weekly charades game that he had been hosting at his home, and that there are some differences in how Pictionary and Win, Lose or Draw are played.

The network version of Win, Lose or Draw was hosted by Vicki Lawrence and ran from September 7, 1987 until September 1, 1989. The syndicated series premiered on the same day, ran until June 1, 1990, and was hosted by Convy and later Robb Weller. A version for teenagers was produced for Disney Channel from 1989 to 1992 with Marc Price as host; it was revived for a brief run in 2014, which was produced by Convy's daughter Jennifer.

== Development and broadcast history ==
Burt Reynolds would have a weekly charades party in his living room and various celebrities would participate from week to week. As he recalled in 1987, one of the frequent participants was Fred Astaire. Reynolds said that Astaire was incredibly shy and would rather draw pictures than act out words, and so he brought out a chalkboard one night for him to use and the game that would eventually become Win, Lose or Draw was born.

Eventually, Reynolds was convinced to try to make a television series out of the weekly game night after Merv Griffin had told him of the success he had garnered with the launch of Jeopardy! in syndication in 1984. In November 1986, a pilot episode was staged at CBS Television City with Bert Convy hosting. Reynolds and his then-wife Loni Anderson played the game along with Tony Danza and Betty White, with Rod Roddy announcing. The set was modeled after Burt Reynolds' living room. The pilot, produced by Reynolds and Convy, garnered interest from both NBC and local station ownership groups, so much so that Reynolds and Convy, through their company Burt & Bert Productions and a partnership with Richard S. Kline of Kline and Friends Productions, decided to produce one edition for NBC's daytime schedule and another for syndication.

On September 7, 1987, both editions of Win, Lose or Draw launched. Vicki Lawrence hosted the edition produced for NBC, while the syndicated edition was hosted by Bert Convy. Bob Hilton served as the announcer for the daytime edition; Gene Wood was the initial announcer for the syndicated series but was eventually replaced by Hilton as the series progressed.

The daytime Win, Lose or Draw inherited the spot previously occupied by Wordplay on NBC's morning schedule and was scheduled at 11:30 a.m., which displaced the show that had been airing there, Scrabble; that show moved to the 12:30 p.m. timeslot that Wordplay had been occupying. Paired in the hour with the daytime version of Wheel of Fortune, both shows faced off against CBS' The Price Is Right, with Win, Lose or Draw competing with the second half of the long running hit. The show lasted just under two years on NBC, airing its finale on September 1, 1989.

The syndicated series, meanwhile, was renewed for a third year which began on September 4, 1989 with a significant amount of changes made. Coinciding with the return of the syndicated series was a new Burt & Bert/Kline and Friends production, a panel game titled 3rd Degree!. After the series was sold with Peter Marshall as the host of its pilot, the producers decided to have Convy leave Win, Lose or Draw to host 3rd Degree!; Robb Weller, who had been a reporter and host for Entertainment Tonight, replaced him for what would prove to be the last season for Win, Lose or Draw. The final new episode aired on June 1, 1990; reruns of the series continued to air until the show was withdrawn from syndication on August 31, 1990.

Reruns of the syndicated version aired on the USA Network from January 1, 1991, to December 24, 1992, and on Game Show Network from April 15, 2002, to March 14, 2004.

During its run, the syndicated Win, Lose or Draw made several road trips, including Hawaii, Central Park in New York City, Burt Reynolds' ranch in Jupiter, Florida, Walt Disney World, Disneyland and Navy Pier in Chicago.

== Gameplay ==
The idea is similar to the game Pictionary. Two teams, men versus women, each composed of two celebrities and one contestant (or a celebrity and two college students in the College Tournament in 1988), took turns guessing a phrase, title or thing, and one teammate was drawing on a large pad of paper with markers. Each team sat on a couch on a set designed after Burt Reynolds' actual living room at the time. The team member doing the drawing could not speak about the subject in his or her drawing and could not use letters, numbers, or symbols. If one of these illegal clues was used, any money won in that puzzle was split between the two teams. However, if a non-drawing team member mentioned a word that was part of the answer, their teammate at the sketch pad was then allowed to write it down.

In the first three rounds, each team had one minute to solve a puzzle, earning $200 ($250 in the pilot) for a correct guess. At the thirty-second mark, a doorbell sounded (or various sounds, like a fanfare during the College Tournament in 1988), and the drawing player had the option of handing the marker off to one of his/her teammates, but the puzzle value would then be cut in half. If the team did not guess within the time limit, the opposing team was given one chance to confer and guess. If they gave the correct answer, they were awarded the money; if not, no money was awarded. By 1989, the first round was later changed to have the drawing contestant sketch a series of clues to a puzzle, one clue at a time. If the team guessed the puzzle from the identified clues, they scored $200.

Following round three, one player for each team was nominated to draw clues in a 90-second speed round. The topics for drawing were simpler for this round compared to those in previous rounds. Each correct guess was worth $100, and the team could only pass twice. The speed round started with the team that was ahead. The team with the most money at the end of the game won, and the contestant on the winning team received $1,000 in addition to the money they had already earned. If both teams were tied at the end of the speed round, each contestant earned $500.

=== Gameplay changes ===
==== Daytime ====
Toward the end of the daytime series' run in 1989, several significant changes were made. First, matches were played with two civilian contestants per team. Second, the speed round was reduced to sixty seconds from ninety.

Third, the $1,000 bonus for the winning team was done away with and a speed round was introduced. It was played for ninety seconds, with the first correct guess paying $50. Each subsequent answer doubled the winnings, but if the team passed the bank was reset to zero and the process started over.

Originally, the round was played until time ran out or the team got ten consecutive correct guesses, which would win them $25,600. After a few playings, the rules changed to where if the team managed to correctly identify seven subjects, regardless of how many passes were used, they won $5,000.

==== Syndication ====
For the third and final syndicated season, several other changes were made.

First, the show introduced returning champions for the first time on either series. A champion could return for up to ten consecutive matches.

Second, the format for the first two rounds underwent significant changes. The two players on each team who were not drawing were not permitted to offer a guess at the puzzle until twenty-five seconds had passed, and the player who was drawing was not allowed to pass. If the team was able to guess the puzzle before the clock hit thirty seconds, the contestant won $200. If the puzzle was guessed correctly after that point, it was worth $100. If time ran out, the opposing side was able to win $50 for coming up with the correct answer.

The shortened speed round introduced on the daytime series was then played. The team in the lead when the round was over won the game and advanced to the bonus round, which was carried over from the daytime series. In the event of a tie, the team that forced the tie was given the choice of two words and set a time for the other team to beat with the second word; the team that did so in the fastest time won.

In the bonus round, which was played for sixty seconds as opposed to ninety, the same rules were otherwise in place. Any passes reset the bank to zero, and seven correct guesses won the contestant $5,000.

=== Audience game ===
If there were extra time at the end of the show, an audience member would be called on stage and given the opportunity to sketch a subject for either the men's or women's team to guess in 60 seconds, much like the main rounds, with $100 awarded if the chosen team was able to identify the subject.

== Disney Channel versions ==
=== Teen Win, Lose or Draw ===
From April 29, 1989, to April 28, 1990, and again from September 10, 1990, to September 26, 1992, Disney Channel aired a version called Teen Win, Lose or Draw. This version was hosted by Marc Price. Jay Wolpert produced the first season, which taped at the Disney-MGM Studios in Orlando, with Stone-Stanley Productions taking over for the rest of the run, at which time production also moved to Hollywood Center Studios in Los Angeles. Originally the show aired on Saturdays at 6:30 p.m. and Sunday mornings at 11:30 a.m. Rotating as announcers during the first season were Brandy Brown, Chase Hampton and Tiffini Hale from The Mickey Mouse Club, with Mark L. Walberg taking over that duty for the final two seasons. Teams were made up of two teenage contestants (one each of two boys and two girls), and a teenage celebrity. Gameplay was largely identical to the original run, with the following differences:

- Round 1 – The Clue Round: A player from each team draw as many words within 60 seconds. Each of the words was a clue to a puzzle – a person, place, thing, event, etc. The team in control had the first chance to answer, if they were unable to give the correct answer, the opposing team could guess to win the points.
- Round 2 – The Phrase Round: The team is given a category, with the phrase based in that category. As in the original, the clue-giver could hand off to a teammate after 30 seconds.
- Round 3 – The Speed Round: Played identically to the adult version, with the trailing team going first (or the team that went first in round one playing first if the score was tied). A grand prize was given to the winning team, with the losing team getting a consolation gift.
- If the score was tied following the Speed Round, each team would play another speed round with 20 seconds on the clock. The team that got more in the 20 seconds won. If the tie persisted after this overtime round, each team would try to guess one word as fast as possible (with a maximum of 60 seconds), and the team that was faster won.

=== Disney's Win, Lose or Draw ===
In April 2013, the Disney Channel announced a new version of Win, Lose or Draw, to be hosted by Justin Willman, which premiered on January 17, 2014. As with Teen Win, Lose or Draw, the two teams on each program are made up of two young contestants plus a teenage celebrity (this time, from a Disney Channel or Disney XD program). New motion-control technology is featured.

== Home versions ==
=== Board game ===
Milton Bradley Company created its version in 1987. It could be played like the TV show, or a variation of the game with pawns and a game board. Party, Junior, and Travel Junior editions were produced, plus a Refill Pack for the game. All contestants who appeared on the show received a copy of the Party edition, as did select audience members. It sold 1 million copies in 1987 alone.

=== Computer and video games ===
Hi Tech Expressions released two editions of the MS-DOS version of the game in 1988, as well as a "Junior" version, followed by a version for the Nintendo Entertainment System in 1989. Both versions of this party game featured a scene set in a living room, with the game contestants (representing real-life players) seated on opposite couches, much like the television show. While the game system drew a picture on the screen, one of the players would have a limited amount (60 seconds for the main game, and 90 for the speed round) of time to type in the word or phrase represented by the image. If the player typed in the incorrect answer, a player on the opposing team would have an opportunity to type the correct answer (in single-player games, the game system would type a random incorrect answer). The team that typed the correct answer would win money for that round, and the team that earned the most money at the end of the game won.

== International versions ==
Country	Name	Host(s)	TV station	Premiere	Finale
Canada ( (Quebec) Québec)	Fais-moi un dessin	Yves Corbeil	TVA	May 23, 1988	August 30, 1991
France	Dessinez, c'est gagné !	Patrice Laffont	Antenne 2	1989	1990
France	Dessinez, c'est gagné ! Junior	Eric Galliano	Antenne 2	1993	1993
Scotland (Gaelic)	De Tha Seo?	Neen Mackay	STV	July 25, 1990	1993
Scotland (Gaelic)	De Tha Seo?	Cathy MacDonald	STV	July 25, 1990	1993
Scotland (Gaelic)	De Tha Seo?	Norman Maclean	STV	July 25, 1990	1993
United Kingdom	Win, Lose or Draw	Danny Baker	ITV	January 30, 1990	February 27, 1998
United Kingdom	Win, Lose or Draw	Shane Richie	ITV	January 30, 1990	February 27, 1998
United Kingdom	Win, Lose or Draw	Bob Mills	ITV	January 30, 1990	February 27, 1998
United Kingdom	Teen Win, Lose or Draw	Darren Day	GMTV	January 2, 1993	February 20, 1993
United Kingdom	Win, Lose or Draw Late	Liza Tarbuck	ITV	April 14, 2004	October 22, 2004

== See also ==
- Fast Draw, a 1968 game show with a similar concept to Win, Lose or Draw and Pictionary
