= Barry & Enright Productions =

Former American television production company

Stafford-Enright Productions
- Formerly: Barry & Enright Productions (1947–1953, 1955–1960, 1975–1991); Barry, Enright & Friendly Productions (1953–1955); Jack Barry Productions (1960–1975)
- Industry: Television production
- Founded: 1947; 79 years ago
- Founders: Jack Barry; Dan Enright
- Defunct: 1991; 35 years ago
- Headquarters: New York City, New York, United States
- Area served: Worldwide
- Products: Television series Game shows

Barry & Enright Productions (also known as either Jack Barry-Dan Enright Productions or Jack Barry & Dan Enright Productions and first known as Barry, Enright & Friendly Productions) was an American television production company that was formed in 1947 by Jack Barry and Dan Enright.

== History ==
Jack Barry and Dan Enright first met at radio station WOR in New York, where Barry was a staff announcer. Their first collaborations were Juvenile Jury, a show which featured a panel of children, who came up with their takes on everyday problems and situations, which were submitted by listeners. This would be followed with Life Begins at Eighty, which was essentially a geriatric version of the former. Both shows made their way to television in 1950.

Another children's show from Barry & Enright was Winky Dink and You, which engaged the young viewers to use their imaginations, as well as a special "magic slate"—a sheet of durable plastic that stuck to the TV screen via static electricity, which enabled the viewer to use crayons to "draw along" with Mr. Barry, as he told stories to the children. A kinescope of this series is available on the tape-trading circuit.

In 1953, Barry & Enright created their first game show, Back That Fact, hosted by Borscht Belt comedian and syndicated columnist Joey Adams. Also that year, the company teamed up with Ed Friendly, a former ABC executive, so the company was renamed to Barry, Enright & Friendly Productions, only to sell back its stock in 1955, back to the old Barry & Enright Productions name.

In 1956 Barry & Enright created the game shows Twenty-One, which was created in response to the highly successful The $64,000 Question, and Tic-Tac-Dough. The company, along with Robert Noah, also created and produced the original version of Concentration. Two years later Twenty-One was cancelled as part of the quiz show scandals, when it was revealed that the producers pre-arranged outcomes. The scandal led to federal legislation against the rigging of game shows and every form of competition show. In 1959 Tic-Tac-Dough was also canceled. Barry & Enright were forced to sell their game shows to NBC, including Concentration, Twenty-One, Dough Re Mi and Tic-Tac-Dough. The company later ceased to exist. Enright formed Aladan Productions, while Barry continued, forming Jack Barry Productions.

=== Comeback to television ===
The pair, blacklisted in the United States, developed several game shows in Canada in the 1960s.

In 1963, Jack Barry Productions worked for Paramount Television Productions to develop game show pilots, mainly for KTLA-TV. He produced pilots, and almost sold its pitch Where Are You From? to CBS, but it was dropped out due to the failure of ABC's 100 Grand.

In 1967, Barry created a daytime game show Everybody's Talking which ran for 26 weeks on ABC. But because of his reputation, he received no public credit; it would be revived in 1973, with a slightly altered format, and re-titled Hollywood's Talking. It ran for 13 weeks on CBS. In 1971, Dan Enright came back to television as executive producer for All About Faces.

After an unsuccessful stint working with former rivals Mark Goodson and Bill Todman, Jack Barry first staged a comeback as an emcee, replacing Dennis Wholey on the short-lived game show The Generation Gap in 1969. Barry then formed his own production company, which he named Jack Barry Productions, partnering with Four Star International until divorced in early 1972, and first made a revival of the earlier game show Juvenile Jury, and in 1971 he sold The Reel Game, which he also hosted, to ABC.

Then in 1972, Barry resurrected his career by selling The Joker's Wild to CBS; the Barry-hosted series became a hit and lasted for three seasons on the network's daytime schedule before its 1975 cancellation. The series had been developed while Barry was still working for Goodson-Todman Productions and two pilots had been shot with Allen Ludden as host, but the series did not sell until Barry gained the rights to the series and took over as host. Barry's production company, however, did not put out any other hit series during this time, as evidenced by the short-lived Hollywood's Talking and Blank Check.

In 1974, Dan Enright came back to the company after nearly a decade of working at Screen Gems, who worked on Canadian projects, worked as a staff executive. In 1975, the company, under Enright's supervision, pitched two pilots to CBS and ABC, but neither sold to series.

=== Barry & Enright Productions reformed ===
In 1975, Barry hired Enright as a producer for The Joker's Wild, who was just employed after working for nearly a decade at Screen Gems. After the series' cancellation the partnership was renewed and Barry & Enright Productions was reformed using the team of the old Jack Barry Productions company, although the name Jack Barry Productions existed as in-name-only.

The first series produced by the revived production company was Break the Bank, a celebrity game show that originally aired on ABC in the spring of 1976 and later that year in syndication with Tom Kennedy (ABC) and Barry hosting. The company formed a partnership with Colbert Television Sales to syndicate most of the series output, started a long-running partnership that lasted nearly a decade.

Barry and Enright then relaunched The Joker's Wild for first-run syndication in 1977, and the following year they licensed the rights to their old 1950s series Tic Tac Dough from NBC, who owns the trademark, for CBS and syndication. Although TTD was cancelled by CBS, the syndicated version became a hit and ran until 1986. Barry & Enright also produced Bullseye and Play the Percentages for syndication in 1980 and Hot Potato for NBC in 1984, which was their last series for a network.

Although the production company was primarily known for game shows, it also worked on other projects such as the comedy films, Private Lessons (1981) and Making Mr. Right (1987) as well as CBS's Jake's Way, a 1980 unsold Western drama series pilot starring Robert Fuller as Fox County Sheriff Jake Rudd, and the short-lived 1982–1983 syndicated investigative newsmagazine Jack Anderson Confidential.

In 1984, the company stepped up their own motion picture activity in order to launch and develop various several projects, and had option rights for two novels in order to adapt to screen.

=== Aftermath ===
In early 1984, Barry was preparing to retire from The Joker's Wild and hand the show over to Jim Peck, his substitute host, as well as take a less active role in the production company (as he was 65 when the year began). However, on May 2, 1984, he suffered a massive heart attack while jogging in New York's Central Park and died. With control of the company now solely in his hands, Enright decided to make several changes to Barry's policies and practices that he and several other staffers did not agree with. One of the bigger changes was to hire Bill Cullen, who had just finished hosting Hot Potato, in place of Peck to host The Joker's Wild.

Enright's changes dissatisfied several longtime employees, including producer Richard S. Kline and Barry's sons, Jon and Douglas. Kline left to form his own production company, Kline and Friends, and took Barry's sons and several other staffers with him including set designer John C. Mula and music composer Hal Hidey. Enright continued to run the company for several years after Barry's death and Kline's departure.

But after both Joker and Tic Tac Dough went off the air in 1986, Barry & Enright Productions failed to produce another hit series in America (although Enright and Wink Martindale co-produced a Canadian-based hit in Bumper Stumpers for the Global Television Network, which also aired in America on USA Network and in the UK, a series called Chain Letters co-produced by Action Time and Tyne Tees Television the same year for ITV).

On July 23, 1986, the company teamed up with television movie producer and book packager Les Alexander to start Barry & Enright & Alexander Productions to produce made-for-television movies and two-hour miniseries, and Les Alexander took a number of projects with them. On July 30, 1986, the company had bought out First Media, which was a distributor-publisher of electronic press kits, and producer-coordinator of press conferences that are conducted via satellite hookups, and the company would be folded into Barry & Enright Productions in order to serve as a division of the studio.

The last program under the Barry & Enright name was a short-lived revival of Tic Tac Dough hosted by Patrick Wayne in 1990. In 1991, the company was renamed Stafford-Enright Productions. Dan Enright died on May 22, 1992. Under the name Stafford-Enright, Susan Stafford executive produced a PBS documentary special The Natural Solutions: Freedom of Choice and the FDA in 1993.

=== Common practices ===
Barry & Enright game shows were known for certain practices that typically were the same across all shows produced by the company regardless of format. For instance, on The Joker's Wild, Tic-Tac-Dough, and Bullseye, all contestants played until they were defeated (although in The Joker's Wild's case, when it aired on CBS, the network had imposed a $25,000 limit on winnings—this ruling was inclusive to all other game shows airing on CBS at the time) as well as for a brief period in the 1980s, where a winnings limit was in place where a contestant could be retired if they reached it. Five consecutive match wins meant the contestant would win a new car, and since contestants could continue until losing it was possible to win multiple cars (an example being Thom McKee, Tic-Tac-Dough's all-time winningest contestant, who won eight cars during his 43-match winning streak). Successor company Sony Pictures Television later used both practices on their Jeopardy! game show; from 1997 to 2003, contestants who retired after winning five consecutive matches won a car; that was abandoned in 2003 when the show adopted the rule allowing winning contestants to continue until losing, leading to 74, 32, and 20 game winners in the 16 years of that format. In 2009 Family Feud adopted the same format, families who win 5 consecutive shows in a row would receive a new car, regardless if they won every Fast Money round in their games or not. In addition, all combined winnings were in increments of $50 (with the exception of The Joker's Wild, whose bonus game featured cash amounts beginning at $25).

Most of the Barry & Enright series featured bonus games that were games of chance. Although the objective was different on each show that employed one of these chance games a similarity existed, where a contestant would have to avoid a hazard element that would cause the contestant to lose the round and all bonus winnings. If the contestant was able to complete the objective they would be rewarded with whatever cash they earned and a package of prizes that typically was worth at least double the cash amount they would win in the round.

Examples of these objectives:

- The Joker's Wild: Avoid "The Devil". To win the player had to accumulate $1,000 or more or spin three of the same dollar amounts in one turn (referred to as a "natural triple"). The "Avoid the Devil" format was abandoned by Barry's children, who produced the 1990 version.
- Tic-Tac-Dough: Avoid a dragon. Depending on the series, a round could be won by either completing a tic-tac-toe line, accumulating over $1,000 or finding the words TIC and TAC, or by finding a dragon slayer.
- Bullseye: Avoid a bolt of lightning. A win could be accomplished in two ways: either by collecting three bullseyes in one spin or a combination of multiple spins, or by surviving a set number of spins without uncovering the lightning; the amount of cash a contestant won would vary from round to round, with a maximum payoff of $10,000 in cash by spinning three bullseyes on one spin.
- 21 (1982 unaired pilot): Accumulate a higher score than the "computer" in a game of computerized blackjack without busting or the computer hitting 17 or above (according to Las Vegas blackjack rules) to win $2,000 and a prize package.
- Break the Bank (1976 syndicated series): Accumulate $2,000 or more from cards held by nine celebrities without finding the card that reads "BUST"; doing so augments cash total to $5,000.
- Bumper Stumpers: (1987–1988) Accumulate $1,000 or more without finding a Stop sign.

Note that Play the Percentages (avoid the answer that was not in the top five answers), the 1990 The Joker's Wild (60-second round, and players spun to match windows based on how many spins were won in the first half), and later years of Bumper Stumpers (solve multiple plates) did not use the practice.

== Employees ==
Employees have included Susan Stafford who was vice president for public relations and Enright's love interest. Another noted staffer was Louis M. Heyward, who was vice president for development. Heyward is the father of Andy Heyward, who was chairman and chief executive officer of DIC Entertainment (now WildBrain) and is currently the CEO of Genius Brands. Barry's sons Jonathan and Douglas Barry, his daughter Barbara Barry, Dan Diana, Chris Sohl, Gary Cox, Mark Maxwell-Smith (who co-created Bumper Stumpers), Mark Phillips and Ron Greenberg (who, on and off, was also an independent producer; he may be best known for The Who, What, or Where Game) were prominent employees of Barry & Enright.

Robert Noah and Howard Felsher, who were producers of Twenty-One and Tic-Tac-Dough respectively, saw their careers revived several years after the quiz show scandals faded from the public's memory, with Noah first working for Mark Goodson and Bill Todman, as producer on the original Match Game, then working for many years with Heatter-Quigley Productions, as executive producer on several of their shows, beginning with the original version of The Hollywood Squares. From there, he finished his career with Reg Grundy Productions, on shows like Scrabble. Noah also wrote a novel, a fictionalized account of the quiz show scandals, All The Right Answers, in 1988. Felsher also went to work for Goodson-Todman, where he was the producer for the second version of Password, which aired on ABC-TV. In 1976, he was executive producer of the original version of Family Feud, where at times during the show's run, he and host Richard Dawson clashed.

As mentioned above, Barry & Enright producer (and frequent director) Richard S. Kline, set designer John C. Mula, music composer Hal Hidey (even though Tic-Tac-Dough and The Joker's Wild would continue to use his music package), and Barry's sons Jon and Douglas would leave the company, following Jack Barry's death, to form Kline & Friends, where they would co-produce the game shows, Win, Lose or Draw and 3rd Degree, with Burt Reynolds and Bert Convy. Gary Cox left following Barry's death to join Reg Grundy Productions, which was adjacent to Barry & Enright in Century City, as an associate producer of Sale of the Century. Ron Greenberg departed Barry & Enright a year before to produce other game show projects. Barry's sons, Jon and Douglas, also worked for Kline & Friends following their father's death, helping to produce Break the Bank (unrelated to B&E's earlier show of the same name; this show suffered numerous backstage issues regarding Kline and the show's original host Gene Rayburn, who quit 14 weeks in), Strike it Rich and the 1990 revival of The Joker's Wild. Mula would return to the company during the summer of 1989 to design the set for Pictionary and again in 1990 for the Tic Tac Dough revival.

Longtime Chuck Barris game show announcer Johnny Jacobs, a longtime friend of Jack Barry's, was the primary announcer of all Jack Barry-produced and Barry & Enright produced-game shows from 1972 to 1977, while working on Barris' The Newlywed Game, The Dating Game and The Gong Show, among others. In 1977, a year after Let's Make a Deal went off the air, its announcer Jay Stewart replaced Jacobs as its primary announcer for four years, and was also its primary spokesman for all Barry & Enright projects outside of the game show world. Jacobs, who died in 1982, did fill in for a few months during the 1978–79 season of The Joker's Wild, and in addition, Johnny Gilbert was also used as a fill-in. Bob Hilton was also used as a fill-in announcer towards the final weeks of the 1979–80 season.

In 1981, Stewart left Barry & Enright Productions following his daughter's suicide. He was replaced by Charlie O'Donnell, who at the time had just finished a five-year run as announcer for Wheel of Fortune. O'Donnell announced for The Joker's Wild, Bullseye, Tic Tac Dough, and Hot Potato during his time with the company, and left after the 1985–86 season. Again, Johnny Gilbert filled in for O'Donnell on occasion, as well as John Harlan.

Besides Barry, some of the hosts Barry & Enright Productions employed during its existence were:

- Jim Peck: frequent substitute host for Barry on The Joker's Wild, was originally intended to become host following Barry's retirement.
- Geoff Edwards: host of Hollywood's Talking and Play the Percentages.
- Bill Cullen: host of Hot Potato, took over for Barry on The Joker's Wild after his death in place of Peck, who remained part of the show as Cullen's substitute from time to time.
- Wink Martindale: host of Tic Tac Dough, later co-produced Bumper Stumpers with company for broadcast on Global Television Network in Canada and on USA Network.
- Art James: Original announcer and substitute host on "Concentration" (1958–60); host of Blank Check, later an announcer for The Joker's Wild and Tic Tac Dough.
- Hugh Downs: Original host of Concentration.
- Gene Rayburn: Jack Barry's substitute host of original daytime Tic Tac Dough until 1958, when he became host of Dough Re Mi.
- Bill Wendell: Replaced Jack Barry as host of Tic Tac Dough after Barry removed himself as host of both it, and Twenty-One.
- Jim Lange: host of Hollywood Connection and Bullseye, plus hosted a 1982 pilot for a revival of Twenty-One.
- Tom Kennedy: host of original version of Break the Bank.
- Nipsey Russell: host of two separate revivals of Juvenile Jury.
- Jim Caldwell: hosted final season of Tic-Tac-Dough after Martindale's departure.

In addition, Jim Perry, Peter Tomarken, Patrick Wayne and Bill Rafferty were given auditions for future game show pilots, none of which were produced. Wayne was eventually chosen to host the aforementioned short-lived 1990 version of Tic Tac Dough, which was the last Barry & Enright production prior to Enright's folding of the company in 1991.

== Ownership of properties ==
On December 2, 1992, Sony Pictures Entertainment made a deal to acquire the Barry & Enright game show library. The deal was completed on December 7, 1992.

Today, the pre-scandal library is owned by NBCUniversal Television Distribution and the post-scandal library is owned by Sony Pictures Television.

There are a few exceptions: the 1950s version of Tic-Tac-Dough is owned by NBCUniversal, the 1950s version of Winky Dink and You is owned by its creators, Harry W. Pritchett and Edwin Brit Wyckoff, the 1958–1973 original version of Concentration is co-owned by Fremantle, and the 1989 kids' version of Pictionary is held by NBCUniversal Television Studio through their ownership of the MCA library. The Walt Disney Company owns the global rights to the 1980 unsold television Western crime drama series pilot Jake's Way on behalf of Disney Television Studios via 20th Television.

== Titles by Barry & Enright Productions ==
=== Owned by NBCUniversal Television ===
- Juvenile Jury (1947–1955)
- Life Begins at Eighty (1950–1956) NBC, DuMont, and ABC
- The Joe DiMaggio Show (1950)
- Wisdom of the Ages (December 1952 – June 1953) 29-episode panel show on DuMont combining panels of Juvenile Jury and Life Begins at Eighty
- Back That Fact (1953)
- You're on Your Own (1956–1957)
- Tic-Tac-Dough (1956–1959)
- Twenty-One (1956–1958)
- High-Low (1957)
- Concentration (1958–1973)
- Dough Re Mi (1958–1960)
- 21 (1982 unsold pilot)
- Pictionary (1989; co-produced by QMI and distributed by MCA TV)

=== Owned by Sony Pictures Television ===
==== Jack Barry Productions ====
- The Joker's Wild (1968–1970 pilots and 1972–1975 Jack Barry Productions, 1977–1986 Barry & Enright Productions distributed by Colbert Television Sales, 1990–1991 Jack Barry Productions distributed by Orbis Communications) (This series was a property of Jack Barry Productions throughout the entire run)
- The Honeymoon Game (1970 unsold pilot) (In association with Metromedia Producers Corporation)
- Juvenile Jury (1970–1971)
- The Reel Game (1971) (in association with Four Star Television and ABC)
- Make the Scene (1972 unsold pilot)
- Hollywood's Talking (1973)
- Countdown (1974 unsold pilot)
- Blank Check (1975)
- People Are Funny (1975 unsold pilot) (in association with Jim Victory Television)
- Hollywood Connection (1975 pilot Jack Barry Productions, 1977 Barry & Enright Productions in association with Golden West Broadcasters distributed by Colbert Television Sales)
- We've Got Your Number (1975 unsold pilot)

==== Barry & Enright Productions ====
Note: Denotes series (*) distributed by Colbert Television Sales

- Double Cross (1975 game show unsold pilot)
- Break the Bank (1976–1977)* (served as both network and syndication)
- Way Out Games (1976–1977) (In association with MGM Television) (co-owned by Warner Bros. Television and Turner Entertainment Co.)
- Tic-Tac-Dough (1978–1986* and 1990 only; 1990 version distributed by ITC Entertainment)
- People Watchers (1970s unsold pilot) (In association with Corinthian Broadcasting Corporation)
- Decisions, Decisions (1978 unsold pilot)
- Joker, Joker, Joker (1979–1981) (Children's edition of The Joker's Wild)*
- Play the Percentages (1980)*
- The Bert Convy Show (1980)*
- Bullseye (1980–1982)*
- Soap World (1982-1984)*(In association with King World Productions)
- Hot Potato (1984)
- All About Us (1985) daily magazine show hosted by Ron Hendren, part of the INDAY package distributed by LBS Communications
- Bumper Stumpers (1987–1990) (In association with the Global Television Network, Wink Martindale Enterprises, and the USA Network)
- Chain Letters (1987–1997) (In association with Tyne Tees Television and Action Time (Barry & Enright 1987–1990, Columbia TriStar International Television 1995–1997))
- Juvenile Jury (1983–1984 and 1989–1991)
- All About the Opposite Sex (1990)
- Hold Everything! (1990)

=== Other productions ===
- Winky Dink and You (1953–1957)
- Search and Destroy (1979 Canadian film) [not to be confused with the 1995 film of the same name]
- Jake's Way (1980 unsold Western drama series pilot) (co-production with 20th Television)
- Private Lessons (1981 feature film) (A Jensen Farley Pictures Release) (co-owned by Paramount Pictures and Lions Gate Entertainment)
- Jack Anderson Confidential (1982-1983) (This was Barry & Enright's first and only syndicated television investigative newsmagazine hosted by Jack Anderson)
- Mama Malone (1984)
- Making Mr. Right (1987 feature film) (An Orion Pictures Release) (Now owned by MGM)
- Next of Kin (1989 feature film) (Distributed by Warner Bros.)
- Caroline? (1990 TV Movie)
