= High-Low (game show) =

- Created by: Jack Barry; Dan Enright
- Directed by: Charles S. Dubin
- Presented by: Jack Barry
- Announcer: Don Pardo
- Composer: Paul Taubman
- Country of origin: United States

Production
- Executive producer: Robert Noah
- Producer: Albert Freedman
- Running time: 30 minutes
- Production companies: Barry & Enright Productions; NBC Productions

Original release
- Network: NBC
- Release: July 4 – September 19, 1957

High Low is an American game show that aired on NBC from July 4 to September 19, 1957. The series was a summer replacement for the variety show The Ford Show. Jack Barry was the emcee and Don Pardo was the announcer.

High Low was broadcast from Studio 6A at NBC Studios in the Rockefeller Center in Manhattan.

== Game play ==
One contestant, stationed in an isolation booth, competed against a three-member panel of celebrities in a test of knowledge inspired by the game High-Low Poker. On his or her first appearance, the contestant was staked $500 of betting money. Barry posed a question containing multiple answers to both the contestant and the panel. Each member of the panel would secretly bid on how many correct answers he or she could give to the question. The panel, studio audience, and home audience could see the bids, but the contestant could not due to the way the booth was situated.

After being told the amount of the "high" bid, the contestant would be given a choice:

- To double his/her winnings by matching the undisclosed "lowest" bid.
- To triple his/her winnings by matching the disclosed "high" bid.

After making his or her choice, the contestant's booth was turned off and the corresponding panelist attempted to complete his/her bid. Once the panelist successfully completed his/her bid, the contestant's booth was turned back on. The contestant must then give as many correct answers as the panelist gave. If the contestant successfully matched the panelist, he or she won the game and the champion's winnings were multiplied accordingly. The contestant also earned the right to return on the next show to decide whether to play another game or walk away with his/her winnings; if at any point a contestant failed to match the panelist's bid, the contestant lost the game and departed with 10% of all previous winnings.

Contestants could continue playing with their current winnings for up to five games. At that point, if the contestant decided to try for a sixth game, he or she started a new set of five games with another $500 stake. Contestants remain until they walk away or are defeated.

Among the celebrities who appeared as panelists on High Low were actor/singer Burl Ives, actresses Patricia Medina and Arlene Dahl, actor Walter Slezak, John Van Doren (Charles Van Doren's brother), and former Twenty-One champ Hank Bloomgarden.

== Episode status ==
Only one episode is known to exist, and has been seen on the trading circuit. All other episodes are believed to have been destroyed due to network policies of the era.
