= Blank Check (game show) =

- Created by: William T. Naud, Rich Jeffries
- Directed by: Richard S. Kline
- Presented by: Art James
- Starring: Judy Rich
- Announcer: Johnny Jacobs
- Theme music composer: Alan Thicke
- Country of origin: United States
- No. of episodes: ~130

Production
- Producer: Mike Metzger
- Production locations: NBC Studios; Burbank, California
- Running time: approx. 26 minutes
- Production company: Jack Barry Productions

Original release
- Network: NBC
- Release: January 6 – July 4, 1975

Blank Check is an American game show that aired on NBC from January 6 to July 4, 1975. It was promoted as "television's first ESP game". Art James was the host, with Johnny Jacobs as the announcer (Johnny Gilbert filled occasionally).

Packaged by Jack Barry, this show was the first produced by Barry on NBC following the quiz show scandals of the 1950s, and the first of three games Barry produced at NBC in Burbank, California (the other two were Bullseye and Hot Potato, both produced by Barry & Enright).

In 1986, Barry & Enright threatened to sue Mark Goodson Productions for copyright infringement regarding the name of a game on The Price Is Right at the time also titled "Blank Check". The game was renamed "Check Game".

== Format ==
Six contestants competed for an entire week of shows, attempting win money by filling out checks for amounts in whole dollars that could run up to four digits.

At any given time, one contestant was the "Check Writer," standing in front of a display that represented a giant blank check and facing the other five who sat in a gallery on the opposite side of the stage. He/she pressed a plunger to freeze five randomizers which each displayed a different nonzero digit, and won a bonus prize if a straight appeared (e.g. 1-2-3-4-5 or 8-7-6-5-4). The host then asked a toss-up question to the gallery, asking for the common thread between two items (e.g. "suspension" and "card game" leading to the response "bridge"). The first gallery member to buzz-in with the correct answer earned the right to challenge the Check Writer, who then secretly chose one of the five digits. The challenger tried to predict this digit; if he/she was incorrect, it was entered onto the check in the rightmost available position and put out of play, and another round was played. If the challenger correctly predicted the chosen digit, the two contestants traded places, the deposed Check Writer won the amount for which the check had been written (if any), and a fresh set of digits was generated to start a new game.

If a Check Writer successfully filled in three digits (ones through hundreds), a member of the studio audience was chosen at random to play against him/her for prizes. The member was shown four prizes and their values, and secretly chose one that the Check Writer had to predict. An incorrect guess awarded the prize to the member and led to another round being played, but a correct guess at any time ended the challenge. If the Check Writer missed on three consecutive guesses, he/she won the amount of the check and the audience member received all four prizes. A toss-up was them played to select a Check Writer from the gallery for a new game, and the defeated one took that contestant's seat. If the Check Writer won the audience challenge, he/she played one last round against the gallery in an attempt to fill out the fourth (thousands) digit. Any Check Writer who completely filled out a check won its amount, and a new Check Writer was selected as in the audience challenge.

All contestants kept the total of the amounts for which they filled out checks during the week, and the one with the largest single check won a bonus prize.

== Broadcast history ==
Blank Check debuted at 12:30 p.m. Eastern time, replacing a daytime version of Name That Tune hosted by Dennis James. At this point, the program had to end five minutes before the half-hour in order to accommodate an NBC News bulletin anchored by Edwin Newman. Blank Check was the eleventh program to air in the 12:30 p.m. slot since the newscast began in October 1960. The Who, What, or Where Game ran the longest, from 1969 to 1974. NBC discontinued the five-minute newscast—its last daytime newscast—on December 31, 1976. The series was replaced on July 7 by The Magnificent Marble Machine at 12:00 p.m. Eastern, which was also hosted by Art James.

James and staff members disliked the format and sometimes referred to it as "Blank Mind" because they thought that it "was dumb luck, a guessing game".
