= Hot Potato (game show) =

- Also known as: (Celebrity) Hot Potato
- Genre: Game show
- Written by: Scott Wyant
- Directed by: Richard S. Kline
- Presented by: Bill Cullen
- Announcer: Charlie O'Donnell
- Theme music composer: Hal Hidey
- Country of origin: United States
- No. of episodes: 115

Production
- Executive producers: Jack Barry; Dan Enright
- Producer: Allen Koss
- Production locations: NBC Studios; Burbank, California
- Running time: 30 Minutes
- Production company: Barry & Enright Productions

Original release
- Network: NBC
- Release: January 23 – June 29, 1984

Hot Potato is a television game show that was broadcast on NBC in the United States from January 23 to June 29, 1984. From April 23 until its conclusion, the show was known as Celebrity Hot Potato.

Bill Cullen was the show's host, his final hosting job for a network series, and Charlie O'Donnell was the announcer. Cullen remarked that he had been chosen to host largely by default, since the originally intended host had flopped during an early run-through of the game and neither Barry & Enright nor NBC could think of anyone else to ask. He also noted that this scenario had occurred repeatedly during his career, resulting in many of his credits as a game show host.

The series was produced by Barry & Enright Productions, the company's first for NBC since the company was a central figure in the 1950s quiz show scandals. Hot Potato was the first game mounted for a network by Barry & Enright since 1976's Break the Bank aired on ABC, the last one the company did not produce exclusively for syndication, and the last original production Jack Barry was a part of; he died on May 2, 1984, a little more than a week after Hot Potato made the switch to the celebrity format.

Hot Potato took over the noon ET timeslot from Go and did not perform well in the ratings, beaten by Family Feud on ABC and frequently pre-empted for local newscasts in some markets. Reruns of Diff'rent Strokes took over that time slot for the rest of the summer before ultimately being replaced by Super Password in September.

== Gameplay ==
Two teams of three players competed, one of which consisted of the previous game's champions. The members of each team shared a common trait (hobby, occupation, etc.). All questions used during the main game had at least seven correct answers. Some were trivia questions with a set number of factual answers – for example, naming the Seven Wonders of the Ancient World – while others required the players to guess the most common responses to a survey, similar to Family Feud.

In each round, Cullen asked a question and stated the number of acceptable answers. One member of the team with initial control started by either giving an answer or challenging an opponent to do so. If the player gave a correct answer, control passed to the next team member in line. An incorrect response sent the player to a bench behind the team's podium, where he/she had to sit out the rest of the round, and gave control to the opposing team. If an opponent responded correctly after being challenged, his/her team took control and the challenging player was eliminated. If not, the opponent was eliminated and control passed to the player after the one who issued the challenge.

As the players gave correct answers, they were displayed on-screen for the viewers' benefit. Once five answers had been given, Cullen would read them back to the players. A player would be cautioned if he/she repeated a previous answer; doing so twice on the same turn sent him/her to the bench.

A team could win a round either by giving the seventh correct answer (regardless of who gave the first six), or by eliminating all three opponents through successful challenges and/or their own mistakes. The first team to win two rounds won $1,000, took/retained the championship, and advanced to the bonus round. The champions started the first round (and the third, if necessary), while the challengers started the second.

Beginning on February 6, 1984, a "Seven Straight Jackpot" was offered to any team that gave seven correct answers in a row without making a mistake or challenging. The jackpot started at $500 and increased by that amount for each match it was not won.

Celebrity Hot Potato followed the same rules, but teams were composed either of three celebrities, or two celebrities and one civilian contestant. In the former case, teams that lost in the main game received $500 for a chosen charity; in the latter, all winnings went to the contestant. The Seven Straight Jackpot was discontinued for all episodes played under this format.

=== Bonus game ===
The winning team was given a subject of comparison (e.g., which weighs more, who has been married more times, etc.) and shown two possible choices. The team discussed the choices and then selected one of them. Each correct response awarded $500; a mistake at any time ended the round and forfeited the accumulated money. The team could pass on one question, and could stop after any question and keep the money. If they answered five questions correctly, they won a jackpot that began at $5,000 and increased by that amount for every game in which it went unclaimed. The jackpot reset to $5,000 when collected or whenever a defending champion team was defeated in the main game.

Teams continued to appear on the show until they either lost the main game or had played the bonus round five times.

On Celebrity Hot Potato, the jackpot was a flat $5,000 and did not increase. All-celebrity teams that lost in this round received $1,000 for their charity.

== Episode status ==
The series reran on CBN, USA Network and Game Show Network in the past and is currently airing on GameTV in Canada. A studio master of the first episode is available for viewing on YouTube.
