= Pictionary (disambiguation) =

Pictionary is a word guessing game. The term can also refer to several derivatives of the original game:

- Pictionary (1989 game show)
- Pictionary (1997 game show)
- Pictionary (2022 game show)
- Pictionary (video game)
