= Juvenile Jury =

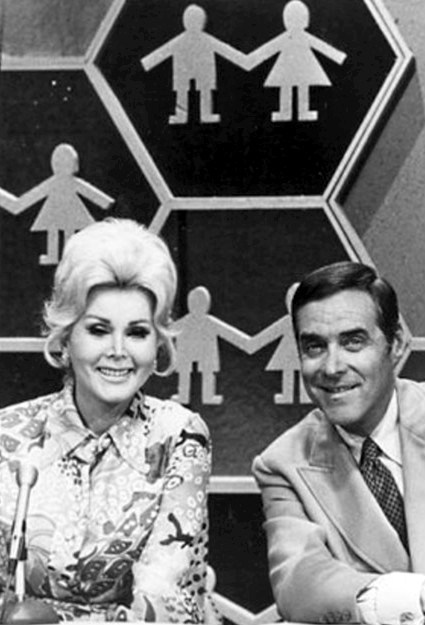
- Jack Barry with guest Zsa Zsa Gabor (from the 1970–71 syndicated version)
- Genre: Game show
- Presented by: Jack Barry; Nipsey Russell
- Country of origin: United States

Production
- Running time: 23–25 minutes

Original release
- Network: NBC (1947–1953); CBS (1954); BET (1983–1984); Syndicated (1970–1971, 1989–1991)
- Release: April 3, 1947 – August 1, 1954

Related
- Life Begins at Eighty; Wisdom of the Ages

Juvenile Jury is an American children's game show that originally ran on NBC from April 3, 1947, to August 1, 1954. It was hosted by Jack Barry and featured a panel of children aged ten or less giving advice to solve the problems of other children. Celebrity guests appeared on the show, including Eddie Cantor, Red Skelton and Milton Berle.

The show began in 1946 as a radio program on WOR in New York, Beginning on June 15, 1946, it was carried on the Mutual Broadcasting System, after which it made the transition to television. It continued to be broadcast as a radio program until 1953.

== Controversy ==
In a 1953 episode, four-year-old panelist Michelle Fogel claimed that she was told the questions/"problems" the night before, and further claimed that her answer to the first problem was what "my mommy told me to say"; Barry then, and again several times during the remainder of the episode, tried to assure the audience that what Fogel said was not the case.

Barry was later involved in the quiz show scandals, and in 1958 testified before a congressional committee about his involvement.

== Legal cases ==
In the late 1940s, Juvenile Jury was the subject of two court cases. The jury in a New York Federal Court rejected William Evans's suit for $600,000 damages. He said that when Barry and other defendants began Juvenile Jury on WOR, the program's concept was one that he had created but was rejected after he submitted it to WGN a few months prior to Juvenile Jury's debut. Meanwhile, a New York Supreme Court case had Carol Marshall suing for piracy, saying that she created an unproduced radio program, Junior Judges, on which Juvenile Jury infringed.

== Revivals ==
The show was revived twice in syndication, once from 1970-1971 hosted again by Barry, and again from 1989-1991 (renamed The New Juvenile Jury) hosted by Nipsey Russell. Incidentally, Russell hosted another version in 1983 under the title Nipsey Russell's Juvenile Jury created specifically for broadcast on cable network BET, who co-produced the show with Barry & Enright Productions. This rendition, though short-lived, was the first original game show for the fledgling network, and one of the few in game show history to feature a predominantly African-American audience. As its theme song, Nipsey Russell's Juvenile Jury utilized the theme music of another short-lived Barry & Enright game show, Play the Percentages from 1980.

== Episode status ==
The NBC version is believed to have been destroyed, as per network practices. Two episodes (including the aforementioned 1953 episode) have been released on DVD, while two others are held by The Paley Center for Media.

Game Show Network aired most of the 1970s version (including the premiere) and 1980s Nipsey Russell version during the network's "Dark Period", from fall 1997 to spring 1998. Clips from both were also used occasionally on the late 1990s GSN original series As Seen On.
