= Sociogenomics =

Academic discipline focused on effects of social factors on genome activity

Sociogenomics, also known as social genomics, is the field of research that examines why and how different social factors and processes (e.g., social stress, conflict, isolation, attachment, etc.) affect the activity of the genome. Social genomics as a field is very young (< 20 years old) and was spurred by the scientific understanding that the expression of genes to their gene products, though not the DNA sequence itself, is affected by the external environment. Social genomics researchers have thus examined the role of social factors (e.g. isolation, rejection) on the expression of individual genes, or more commonly, clusters of many genes (i.e. gene profiles, or gene programs).

== History ==
In the early 2000s, initial work on this topic was conducted in animal model systems, such as zebra finch, honeybee, and cichlid, by Gene E. Robinson at the University of Illinois among others. In 2007, Steve Cole at UCLA published the first study of social factors, in this case social connection, on the immune cell gene expression among healthy older adults. Shortly thereafter, a series of papers were published by Youssef Idaghdour and his colleagues looking at the role of environmental factors on gene expression throughout the genome where they found that only 5% of the variation in genomic expression was attributable to genetic factors (i.e. sequence variation in the genome) whereas, as much as half was due to the living environment of the individual, either urban or rural. These studies set the stage for looking at environmental modulation of gene expression including social influences.

== Biological pathways ==
The 23 pairs of DNA molecules called chromosomes contain the approximately 21,000 genes comprising the “human blueprint.” For this blueprint to have any biological affect however, it must be transcribed to RNA and then into proteins. This process of translation, or “turning on” of a gene to its final gene products is termed gene expression. Genetic expression is far from random, allowing the differentiation and specialization of different cell types with identical genomes. Transcription factors are the proteins which control gene expression, and they can either increase (i.e. an activator) or decrease (i.e. a repressor) expression. Multiple transcription factors exist that are responsive to the internal environment of the cell (e.g. to maintain cell differentiation), but several also appear to be responsive to external factors including several hormones, neurotransmitters, and growth factors. The sum total of genes expressed into RNA in a particular population of cells is referred to as the transcriptome.

Research has shown that the activity of gene profiles or gene programs can be affected by the physical and social environments that humans inhabit. The pattern of social stress-related changes in gene expression has been termed by Steve Cole and George Slavich at UCLA as a conserved transcriptional response to adversity (CTRA). In healthy situations, the human immune system is biased towards anti-viral readiness. However under conditions of social stress there appears to be a shift towards pro-inflammatory immunological processes including the production of various pro-inflammatory cytokines including IL-1β and IL-6. Simultaneously, social stress is associated with the down-regulation of anti-viral gene products including interferon type 1 and specific antibody isotypes (e.g. immunoglobulin G). This pattern of up-regulated pro-inflammatory transcription coupled with down-regulated anti-viral transcription challenged the previously held belief that social stress was generally immunosuppressive.

An evolutionary explanation for the origin of the CTRA, characterized by increased pro-inflammatory gene expression and a suppression of anti-viral gene expression, has been proposed. From an evolutionary perspective, the frequent social contact of homo-sapiens increases the probability of viral infection. Thus a bias towards anti-viral readiness would be adaptive. In conditions of social stress however, the up-regulation of pro-inflammatory gene expression prepares the body to better deal with bodily injury and bacterial infection which is more likely under conditions of social stress either through hostile human contact, or increased predatory vulnerability due to separation from the social group. In the modern age however, the chronic elevation of pro-inflammatory gene expression produced by social stress is more likely to result in inflammation-related diseases including various cancers, cardiovascular disease and rheumatoid arthritis. Concurrently, the down-regulation of anti-viral gene expression leaves the individual more vulnerable to viral infection such as the flu and the common cold.

Social signal transduction is the process through which social factors influence the transcriptome. This process is mediated by the central nervous system via changes in hormonal and neurotransmitter signals. For example catecholamines, the class of neurotransmitters that includes dopamine and norepinephrine, have been linked with responses to acute stressors including the fight-or-flight response, and also appear to modulate the transcription of multiple transcription factors that impact inflammatory and anti-viral genes. Norepinephrine release, for example, results in the activation of the transcription factor CREB, via the activity of β-adrenergic receptors. CREB then is able to up-regulate the transcription of many different genes. Thus, through effects of canonical neurotransmitter systems such as catecholamines, social stressors are able to penetrate the nucleus of various cell types and alter the gene transcription profiles within these cells.

Other transcription factors that have been known to respond to social factors include some factors broadly related to the neurobiology of threat including NF-κB (which, in addition to CREB, is a widely implicated transcription factor affecting pro-inflammatory gene expression), cyclic adenosine monophosphate (cAMP), glucocorticoids (in particular glucocorticoid insensitivity, where inflammatory pathways are unusually insensitive to negative regulation by glucocorticoids), and interferon transcription factors (which mediate the depression of anti-viral immunity).

Epigenetic factors including DNA methylation and histone modification have also been proposed as possible biological mechanisms. For example, childhood maltreatment in rodent models and humans has been shown to alter the epigenetics of the glucocorticoid receptor gene. The epigenetic influences on social genomic outcomes are still largely unknown at present and require additional research.

== Longitudinal effects ==
While the majority of experimental social genomics research has elucidated the role of acute social stress on the CTRA, it has been proposed that social factors can, under some circumstances, promote more persistent modulation of the human transcriptome. Several pro-inflammatory gene products, including multiple cytokines, exist in a recursive system wherein their presence promotes their own transcription. From a psychological standpoint, the experience of social stressors can, in certain individuals, promote the experience of future social stressors, as in the stress-generation theory of depression, wherein depressive symptoms increase the likelihood of future stressful events. Future studies are needed to test whether individual differences in the magnitude of the CTRA are biologically related to stress-generation.

Recent studies suggest that childhood adversity, including financial hardship, family instability, and exposure to abuse, is associated with lasting changes in DNA methylation across development. These epigenetic differences are most pronounced when adversity occurs during sensitive developmental periods, particularly early childhood, and may emerge later in adolescence. In addition to site-specific methylation changes, childhood adversity has also been linked to accelerated epigenetic aging, a biomarker predictive of later morbidity. Notably, supportive caregiving environments may buffer these effects, with positive parenting associated with reduced epigenetic age acceleration among exposed children. Together, these findings provide consistent evidence that early-life social adversity can shape long-term health through epigenetic mechanisms.

== Relationship with health ==
Epidemiological research has demonstrated that social factors including social isolation can have large effects on various diseases and all-cause mortality. Social genomics represents a plausible mechanism subserving this link between the social environment and disease risk. For example, individuals who have chronic social isolation have different transcriptome profiles for genes related to immune system factors including elevated expression of pro-inflammatory cytokine genes and depressed expression of anti-viral genes. Chronically isolated individuals are also more likely to develop inflammation-related diseases thus providing a plausible biological connection between social variables (e.g. isolation, rejection, social stress, and socioeconomic status) and disease risk and mortality, namely heightened inflammation mediated by differential gene expression. Though this line of research is relatively young, acute and chronic social stressors have been linked with altered gene expression in various tissues in addition to immune cells including breast tissue, lymph nodes, and brain cells, and in diseased tissues including ovarian, prostate, and breast cancer.

Simultaneously, chronic social stressors results in the individual being more susceptible to viral infection as a consequence of the down-regulation of anti-viral gene expression. The enhanced susceptibility to various viral infections maintained the hypothesis that social stress was generally immunosuppressive and only recently, through social genomic research, has the immunosuppressive hypothesis been challenged.

One consistent observation in social genomics research is that the perception of social stressors is a stronger and more reliable predictor of the CTRA than the objective presence of social stressor. For example, the subjective perception of isolation is a stronger predictor of pro-inflammatory gene expression than is the objective size of one's social network. This neurocognitive control of the CTRA suggests that altering one's perception of their social situation, for example by utilizing skills honed in cognitive therapy may be able to alleviate the negative consequences of the social stress and the CTRA.

== See also ==
- Eugenics
- Dysgenics
- Genoeconomics
- Human reproductive ecology
- Income and fertility
- Intelligence and fertility
- Psychogenomics
