= Bob Hilton =

American television personality

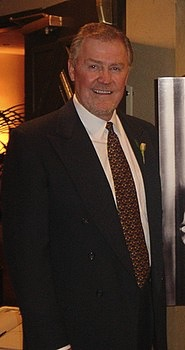
- Born: July 23, 1943 (age 83)
- Occupations: Announcer, game show host
- Years active: 1977–present
- Spouse: Joni Hilton
- Children: 4

Bob Hilton (born July 23, 1943) is an American television game show personality. He hosted The Guinness Game, a revival of Truth or Consequences, and the 1990 revival of Let's Make a Deal for two seasons, and announced many other shows. He's the Bob of "Bob, tell 'em what they've won" fame.

== Biography ==
Hilton has announced numerous game shows, such as Card Sharks; Child's Play; Trivia Trap; The $25,000 Pyramid; The $100,000 Pyramid; Blockbusters; Double Talk; The New Newlywed Game; The All-New Dating Game; Strike It Rich; Win, Lose or Draw; and Body Language. His first game show announcing assignment was in 1980 on Tic-Tac-Dough (filling in for regular announcer Jay Stewart), followed by The Joker's Wild and Play the Percentages, after he began a contract with Barry & Enright Productions, that same year. Hilton also announced The Price Is Right following the death of its original announcer, Johnny Olson. According to former producer Roger Dobkowitz, he did extremely well. However, Hilton was already working on several other shows at the time, so the job was given to Rod Roddy.

Hilton's non-game show announcing work included the 1988 CBS specials Live! Dick Clark Presents and the ABC daytime program Home in the early 1990s.

Hilton got his start in Louisiana at station KPLC-TV. He traveled around to various stations as news anchor/reporter, such as in Honolulu, Hawaii, KTRK-TV in Houston, KGAN-TV in Cedar Rapids, WNAC-TV in Boston (The Bob Hilton Show), and KHJ-TV in Los Angeles. He later went on to KOVR in Sacramento, California.

Hilton is a Latter-day Saint. On one occasion he turned down a television show job because he and his wife Joni felt that it was "too titillating."

== Wife ==
Hilton is married to the former Joni Pennock. She was Miss California USA in 1976. She has also been a TV talk show host. More recently she has written 23 books, many of them novels. She has also worked as a magazine correspondent and writer for the Tabernacle Choir at Temple Square program Music and the Spoken Word. She is also an award-winning playwright.
