= Dough Re Mi =

American game show (1958–1960)

- Created by: Jack Barry; Dan Enright
- Directed by: Ted Nathanson; Dick Schneider; Dick Auerbach
- Presented by: Gene Rayburn
- Announcer: Roger Tuttle; Wayne Howell
- Composer: Paul Taubman (Music Director)
- Country of origin: United States
- No. of episodes: 620

Production
- Executive producers: Robert Noah; Ed Pierce
- Producers: Hugh Branigan; Fred Stettner
- Production locations: NBC Studios; New York, New York
- Running time: 30 minutes
- Production companies: Barry & Enright Productions (1958); NBC Productions (1958-1960)

Original release
- Network: NBC
- Release: February 24, 1958 – December 30, 1960

Dough Re Mi is an American game show that aired on NBC from February 24, 1958, to December 30, 1960. The series was hosted by Gene Rayburn and was somewhat of an answer to CBS' Name That Tune, which began in 1953.

Among those who substituted for Rayburn during the run were Jack Barry (prior to the scandals pushing him out of television), announcer Roger Tuttle, Dayton Allen, Keefe Brasselle, and Fred Robbins.

== Game play ==
Three contestants competed to identify song titles using the first few notes. Each game consisted of three songs worth $100, $300, and $500, respectively (originally $100, $200, and $400). The contestants were each given a $200 bankroll to start the game. In each round, each contestant was given one opportunity to guess the title of the song after the first three notes were played. If the song title was guessed correctly, the contestant won the value of the song.

If nobody could identify the song, the fourth note was then put up for bid in a similar format to The Price is Right. Each player, one at a time, would take turns bidding any amount of their bankrolls until either a bell rang or all players had stopped bidding.

The contestant with the highest bid immediately had that amount deducted from their bankroll, and the first four notes were then played for the contestant with the highest bid. If the song title was guessed correctly, the contestant won the value of the song. If the title was guessed incorrectly, the contestant could recoup by challenging their opponents. If the challenged player could not guess the title of the song, the challenger recovered half of their bid and bidding started for the fifth note, and so on. However, if the challenged player correctly guessed the title, the challenger lost their entire bid and the challenged player won the value of the song.

The player with the most money in their bankroll following the third song won the game. The winner could leave with whatever money they had won at that point if they wished; if they chose to play another game, their $200 stake for the next game came out of their winnings.

This show also had a home audience participation segment wherein on Mondays two notes were played for the home audience to try to guess the song and send in a postcard with that title. On Tuesday they would play three notes for the same purpose and continue through the week. The following week a prize was awarded by selecting a winning postcard.

== Celebrities ==
Occasionally, celebrities would appear and play the game for charity. Among the celebrities who appeared were Lou Costello, Florence Henderson, Tony Bennett, Lu Ann Simms, Jaye P. Morgan, and Peter Marshall.

== Scandal ==
Partly due to being owned by Jack Barry and Dan Enright, Dough Re Mi was one of the games caught in the quiz show scandals. Like Barry & Enright's Concentration, Twenty One and Tic Tac Dough, the shows were bought by NBC and became in-house productions.

== Home game ==
A board game, complete with an eight-key xylophone, was released in 1960 by Lowell Toy Mfg. Since its release, the game has become very hard to find – a copy complete with the xylophone is both very rare and, when a complete copy surfaces, very expensive.

== Episode Status ==
Dough Re Mi is believed to have been wiped due to network policies of the era; however, this is uncertain since Concentration has been reported to be intact. The only existing episode is the third episode from February 26, 1958.
