= Georgiana Carhart =

American opera singer (1865–1959)

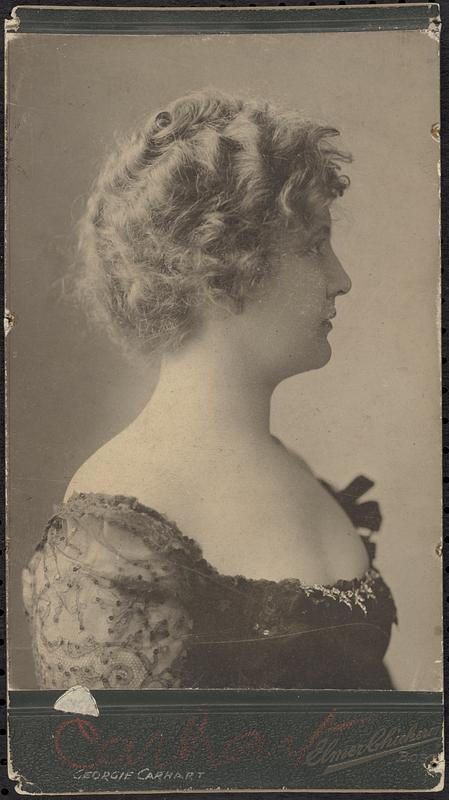
- Born: May 17, 1865; Baltimore
- Died: March 2, 1959 (aged 93); Manhattan
- Occupation: Concert singer, opera singer, radio personality

Georgiana Powers Carhart (May 17, 1865 – March 2, 1959) an American mezzo soprano opera singer and later radio and television personality, best known as a panelist on Life Begins at Eighty.

She was born Georgiana Powers on May 17, 1865 in Baltimore, Maryland. She made her New York stage debut in 1893 opposite Guy Standing in La Folote at the Casino Theatre. She also appeared in productions of Gilbert and Sullivan's H.M.S. Pinafore and Patience. From 1901 to 1911 she lived and performed in Dresden, Germany. She returned to the United States and retired from the stage in 1911.

Starting in 1947, Carhart became a regular on the radio show and later television show Life Begins at Eighty. Jack Barry hosted a panel of octogenarians who offered frank and uninhibited talk about numerous topics. On the show, Carhart was known for her quick wit and flirtatiousness, which brought her a degree of celebrity.

Georgiana Carhart died at the Mary Manning Walsh Home in Manhattan on 2 March 1959.

== Personal life ==
In the 1870s, she married Carrington E. Carhart of the Kansas City Times, who died in 1917. In the 1890s, she had an affair with the married music critic James Gibbons Huneker, who wrote that she "was the only female voice I've ever heard that could bring tears to my eyes."
