= Jay Stewart =

American game show announcer

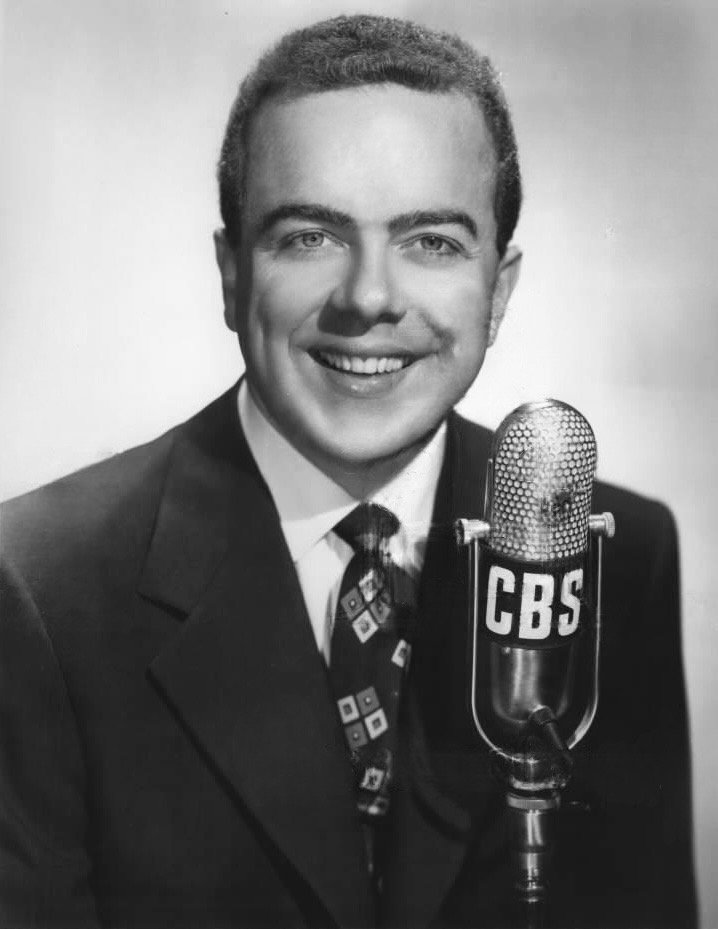
- Stewart in 1950
- Born: Jay Stewart Fix; September 6, 1918; Summitville, Indiana, U.S.
- Died: September 17, 1989 (aged 71); Los Angeles, California, U.S.
- Occupations: Television and radio announcer
- Years active: 1943–1989
- Spouse: Phyllis Kiser
- Children: 2

Jay Stewart Fix (September 6, 1918 – September 17, 1989) was an American television and radio announcer known primarily for his work on game shows. He was probably best known as the announcer on the long running game show Let's Make a Deal, in which he appeared throughout the 1960s and 1970s. Other shows for which he announced regularly include the Reg Grundy productions Scrabble and Sale of the Century, as well as the Jack Barry–Dan Enright productions The Joker's Wild, Tic-Tac-Dough and Bullseye. Stewart died by suicide in 1989.

== Education and early career ==
Born in Summitville, Indiana, Stewart broke into show business as a saxophone player. He attended Butler University and won a 1939 award as one of the outstanding Sigma Chi graduates in the United States. After graduation he landed radio announcing jobs at WBOW in Terre Haute and WLW in Cincinnati. In 1943 Stewart moved to Los Angeles, where he continued his career as a radio announcer. In 1953 Stewart became the host of NBC Radio's It Pays To Be Married.

Stewart was one of the hosts for Town Hall Party, a Los Angeles–based country music program airing from 1952 to 1961 and carried by KFI radio and KTTV-TV television. He was also an announcer for The Mike Douglas Show when production moved to Los Angeles in 1978.

Stewart was originally married to Beverly Barnes Fix. The two had two daughters, Jamie and Julie Fix (now Julie Bratspis). After divorcing, he later married Phyllis Kiser. Later in life, youngest daughter, Julie had two children, Emily Bratspis (now Liebenberg) and Andrew Bratspis.

== Career highlights ==
Stewart was perhaps best known for his work on Let's Make a Deal and in the 1980s on Sale of the Century and Scrabble. Let's Make a Deal host Monty Hall called Stewart "the best second banana you ever found in your life" and said that "it was a very, very good feeling between us." On Let's Make a Deal Stewart participated onstage as well as announcing, often seen modeling the show's "zonk" prizes (a practice also used by current announcer Jonathan Mangum).

Stewart was also the primary announcer for all Barry & Enright game shows from 1977 until 1981, including The Joker's Wild, Tic-Tac-Dough, and Bullseye. Stewart was even the announcer in the trailers and TV spots for the company's controversial 1981 sex comedy Private Lessons. Charlie O'Donnell took over the role on the Barry-Enright shows starting in the 1981–82 season, when Stewart left due to his daughter's suicide.

In 1981, Jay was selected by Mark Goodson to announce approximately four to six weeks worth of episodes on Card Sharks, pairing him with future Sale of the Century host Jim Perry. It was Stewart's only announcing assignment for Mark Goodson Productions, occurring while he was still employed with Barry & Enright. Both Stewart and Johnny Olson were brought in to substitute for regular announcer Gene Wood, who was recovering from a serious automobile accident.

Besides his duties on the NBC and syndicated versions of $ale of the Century, Stewart announced the first year of Scrabble before being replaced by Charlie Tuna in 1985. A year later, in 1986, he made a cameo appearance on the series finale of The All-New Let's Make a Deal alongside original LMAD prize model Carol Merrill; Stewart's appearance, like many of his on-screen appearances on the original series, was modeling a zonk a player had just won (although that time, he wore a business suit rather than a zonk-related costume as he did on the original series). In addition, between his stints with Barry & Enright and Reg Grundy Productions, Stewart was the voice-over for National Enquirer commercials, which he continued to do until around 1986.

Stewart left Sale of the Century in 1988. His final announcing position was on Blackout shortly after his departure from Sale, where he filled in for an ill Johnny Gilbert as the show's announcer for its final two weeks.

== Later work and declining health ==
In late 1981, Stewart's daughter Jamie died by suicide. During this time, he took a year-and-a-half respite from announcing and found religion, appearing on The 700 Club to proclaim his newfound faith, which led to him doing voiceover promos for host Pat Robertson's CBN Cable Network (formerly CBN Satellite Service and now Freeform). He returned to the game show arena in 1983 as the announcer of $ale of the Century, which he held for five years. Stewart participated in several Instant Bargains during the course of his tenure on Sale.

Stewart could not overcome the pain of his daughter's death and turned to alcohol, which ultimately led to his departure from $ale of the Century in January 1988. During this time, he moved into the managerial field; one of his clients was Harry Stevens, who announced the syndicated version of Finders Keepers and the 1989 version of Pictionary.

== Death ==
On September 17, 1989, Stewart died by suicide by shooting himself in the carport of his home 11 days after his 71st birthday. An explanatory note and a last will and testament was discovered in his possession. He had been experiencing severe depression and he also suffered from chronic, intractable back pain for years, reportedly due to frequent heavy lifting during his work on Let's Make a Deal (Stewart had to carry prize display tables to and from the audience area whenever a game on Let's Make a Deal called for them; he would bring out the prizes, announce them, then take them back offstage when done). Stewart is buried at Forest Lawn Memorial Park in Hollywood Hills.
