= Bullseye (1980 American game show) =

- Also known as: Celebrity Bullseye
- Created by: Jack Barry & Dan Enright
- Presented by: Jim Lange
- Announcer: Jay Stewart; Charlie O'Donnell
- Theme music composer: Hal Hidey
- Country of origin: United States
- No. of episodes: 390

Production
- Production locations: NBC Studios; Burbank, California (1980–1981); CBS Television City; Hollywood, California (1981–1982)
- Running time: 22 minutes
- Production company: Barry & Enright Productions

Original release
- Network: Syndication
- Release: September 29, 1980 – June 25, 1982

Bullseye is an American game show that aired in syndication from September 29, 1980, to June 25, 1982, with reruns continuing until September 24, 1982. Jim Lange was the host, and the program was produced by Jack Barry and Dan Enright. Jay Stewart was the announcer for the first season, and Charlie O'Donnell announced for the second season. The series' executive producer was Ron Greenberg.

== Gameplay ==
=== Main game ===
Two contestants competed, one a returning champion who had initial control of the game. The gameboard consisted of three circular windows arranged in an upside-down triangle. Eight different categories were available per game, four in each of the top two windows, while the bottom window displayed numbers from one to five as well as a bullseye.

The windows were covered up and spun to randomize the contents, and the contestant in control hit a button (with a target decorated on it) on his/her podium to freeze and reveal them. Each top window displayed a category and a dollar amount from $50 to $200 in increments of $50, and the bottom window indicated the number of questions in a "contract" that had to be completed in order to claim any money. After choosing a category/value pair, the contestant answered one question at a time; each correct response added the value to a pot. The bullseye represented an open-ended contract, which allowed a contestant to continue answering questions as long as he/she desired and stop after any correct response. If a contestant missed a question at any point, the opponent was given a chance to take control of the contract with a right answer; if a bullseye had been spun, the opponent could then either end the contract or take more questions. If both contestants missed the same question, whether on a bullseye or not, it was thrown out and control reverted to the contestant who had originally tried to answer it. Once a contract was completed or ended, the contestant who did so could choose to bank the money in the pot and give up control of the next spin to the opponent, or leave the money in the pot and spin again.

Originally, the first contestant to bank $1,000 or more won the game. During the two-week period of November 24 to December 5, 1980, the same amount won by a champion in the main game would also be donated to a children's charity. To ensure the charities would receive more money, the question values were doubled to $100 to $400, with a total of $2,000 or more needed to win, and these increased amounts remained in place for the rest of the series. Towards the end of 1981 when it became a celebrity format instead of contestants, a $500 value was added to the main game.

Contestants kept any money banked during a game, regardless of the outcome, making Bullseye one of the few Barry & Enright shows to allow losing contestants to keep winnings from the game.

Since the champion always spun first, it was possible for him/her to win without giving the challenger an opportunity to play. If this happened, the challenger returned to play again in the next game.

As was the case with most Barry & Enright game shows, a contestant won a new car after every fifth victory, and players competed until beaten in the main game.

=== Bonus Island ===
The champion advanced to play the bonus round, referred to as "Bonus Island," playing for cash and a prize package. Once again, he/she hit a button (again with a target decorated on it) to stop the spinning windows. For this round, however, the windows contained various dollar amounts ($100–$150–$200 originally, later increased to $100–$200–$300 during the fifth week). All three windows also contained bullseyes, and one contained a lightning bolt.

After each safe spin, any dollar amounts appearing in the windows were added to the pot for this round. Originally, if any bullseyes appeared, the champion had the option to freeze those windows and put them out of play; this option was later removed and any windows showing bullseyes were automatically frozen. The champion could choose to stop at any time and keep the accumulated money, but if the lightning appeared, the round ended and he/she forfeited the money. The location of the lightning was not revealed until after the round was over, so the champion had no way of knowing whether it had been put out of play behind a bullseye.

In order to win the round, the champion had to either spin three bullseyes or survive a set number of spins (originally ten, but reduced to seven beginning in the second season). If the champion spun three bullseyes, the amount of money in the pot was doubled; if the champion managed to survive the allotment of spins without hitting lightning, he/she won either $5,000 or all the money in the pot, whichever was greater. If three bullseyes were spun in one turn, the champion won $10,000 in cash in addition to the prize package (originally $5,000).

Except for the Celebrity Bullseye episodes, which did not offer prizes, the same prize package was at stake throughout a particular episode until won.

== Production information ==
The show featured a bombastic music package from Barry and Enright's in-house music composer Hal Hidey, including a main theme strongly reminiscent of the Santa Esmeralda disco hit "Don't Let Me Be Misunderstood," which had been used itself on the pilot. An eerie sound effect was used while the swirls were in motion, as well as during the window reveals following a bonus round win. The game board itself was run by slide projectors, similar to other game shows such as The Joker's Wild, Blockbusters, and Press Your Luck.

Bullseye first originated from NBC Studios in Burbank, California, taping in stages 2, 3, and 4 at different times. In 1981, production of Bullseye moved to Studio 31 of CBS Television City in Los Angeles, California. Later that same year, production of Bullseye was moved to Television City's Studio 33; the show briefly returned to Studio 31 in early 1982, but returned to Studio 33 for the remainder of its run.

=== Celebrity Bullseye ===
On December 7, 1981, the show changed its name to Celebrity Bullseye and featured celebrity contestants playing for their favorite charities. The celebrities played a best two-out-of-three game. The categories were no longer announced by Lange before the game began and most questions were multiple-choice, containing three possible answers. Otherwise, gameplay was unchanged; the first celebrity to win two games became champion and continued playing until beaten.

Celebrities who played included Daryl Anderson, F. Lee Bailey, Meredith Baxter, Ernest Borgnine, Jim Brown, Jack Coleman, Doug Davidson, Phyllis Diller, Max Gail, Lynda Goodfriend, Shecky Greene, Rosey Grier, Richard Kline, Harvey Korman, Diane Ladd, Gloria Loring, Tina Louise, Jerry Mathers, Rue McClanahan, Brian S. Mitchell, Rita Moreno, Greg Morris, Donna Pescow, Lynn Redgrave, Roxie Roker, Nipsey Russell, Lilibet Stern, Fred Travalena, Patrick Wayne and Jo Anne Worley.

=== Episode status ===
All episodes exist, with reruns airing on CBN Cable (1982–1984) and USA Network (April 1, 1985 – June 26, 1987) with Game Show Network doing so in more recent years (as recent as November 2007 for a "Viewers' Choice" marathon).
