= Back That Fact =

- Created by: Jack Barry; Dan Enright
- Directed by: Mickey Trenner
- Presented by: Joey Adams; Hope Lange (Assistant); Al Kelly (Assistant)
- Narrated by: Carl Caruso
- Composer: John Gart
- Country of origin: United States

Production
- Producers: Jack Barry; Dan Enright; Ed Friendly; Jack Farren
- Running time: 30 Minutes
- Production companies: Barry & Enright Productions (as Barry-Enright-Friendly Productions); American Broadcasting Company

Original release
- Network: ABC
- Release: October 22 – November 26, 1953

Back That Fact is an American game show that aired on ABC from October 22 to November 26, 1953. This was the first TV game show for creator/producers Jack Barry and Dan Enright. Borscht Belt comedian and syndicated columnist Joey Adams was the emcee, with actress Hope Lange and actor Al Kelly as his assistants and Carl Caruso as the announcer.

== Game play ==
At the beginning of the show, a panel of judges was chosen from members of the studio audience. Adams interviewed members of the audience about their life, family, job, hobbies and other parts of their background. If at any time during the interview the contestant made a positive assertion on an answer, Caruso interrupted to ask the player to "Back That Fact". At that point, the player would attempt to prove, to the best of their ability, that the assertion was true. The judges would then decide if the player successfully justified or verified their explanation. If the judges agreed, the player won a modest prize. If not, the player lost the game and another player is interviewed.

Two or three audience members were chosen to be interviewed during the course of the show.

== Episode status ==
Back That Fact is believed not to have been recorded on kinescope. No episodes are known to exist.

== Production ==
Back That Fact was broadcast live from New York City on Thursdays from 9 to 9:30 p.m. Eastern Time.
