= Everybody's Talking =

US television program

- Created by: Jack Barry; Jerome Schnur
- Presented by: Lloyd Thaxton
- Announcer: Wink Martindale; Charlie O'Donnell
- Country of origin: United States

Production
- Running time: 30 minutes
- Production company: Jerome Schnur Productions

Original release
- Network: ABC
- Release: February 6 – December 29, 1967

Everybody's Talking is an American game show which aired on ABC from February 6 to December 29, 1967. Lloyd Thaxton was the host; Wink Martindale and Charlie O'Donnell were the announcers. Thaxton typically closed each episode by saying, "Keep watching, and keep listening, because everybody's talking!"

Veteran producer Jack Barry created this show during a brief period working for Goodson-Todman. Due to lingering bad publicity concerning his possible involvement in the rigging of Twenty-One and Tic-Tac-Dough in the late 1950s, he asked that his name be kept off the credits. Jerome Schnur Productions packaged the show instead. It was the last American daytime television program aired in black and white, despite the "Big 3" commercial networks having converted to color by September 1967.

== Gameplay ==
The object of the game was for three contestants to watch a film of people on the street making short descriptions of a person, place, or object. The point value of each round started at 100, then counted down one point approximately every second. The first player to buzz in with a guess as to what "everybody's talking" about froze the point value of the round. If the other two players had a guess, they had to buzz in and make it before the subject was revealed (and with the point value frozen, they didn't know when this would be). The player with the correct guess (if any) got the points, and subsequent rounds were played in the same manner until one player scored at least 100 points. That player received $1 for every point earned and went on to play the bonus round, in which a correct guess could add $2 times the point value, which again started at 100.

By Summer, the contestants were replaced by three celebrities playing for viewers at home. The program opened with each drawing a postcard backstage before entering the studio. The object remained the same, with the first to reach 100 points also winning a prize for that home viewer (the other two home viewers received a consolation prize).

== Revival ==
In 1973, Barry revived the show as Hollywood's Talking with three contestants trying to guess what a number of celebrities were talking about. A contestant who made a correct guess during the first one-third of the film won $150; during the second third, $100; and during the last third, $50. The first player to score $200 went on to a bonus round, identifying short descriptions for additional prize money.
