= Hollywood's Talking =

- Logo from the first episode of Hollywood's Talking.
- Created by: Jack Barry
- Presented by: Geoff Edwards
- Announcer: Johnny Jacobs
- Country of origin: United States
- No. of episodes: 65

Production
- Production locations: CBS Television City; Hollywood, California
- Running time: 30 minutes
- Production company: Jack Barry Productions

Original release
- Network: CBS
- Release: March 26 – June 22, 1973

Hollywood's Talking is an American game show based on the 1960s quizzer, Everybody's Talking, and produced by Jack Barry. It ran on CBS for three months in 1973, debuting on March 26 (alongside The $10,000 Pyramid and The Young and the Restless) and ending on June 22 to make room for a new version of Match Game.

It was hosted by Geoff Edwards, with Johnny Jacobs announcing. The series was the first national game show hosted by Edwards.

The program aired at 3:30 p.m./2:30 Central time, opposite ABC's One Life to Live (then still a 30-minute show) and NBC's Return to Peyton Place.

Edwards once said that while hosting this series, he had a tenuous working relationship with Jack Barry. Edwards recalled Barry saying, "You know, you have a really annoying voice. Can you do something about that?" Edwards responded with, "Jack, I have a contract for 13 weeks. At the end of 13 weeks, don't renew it and don't come into my dressing room again." It was not until 1980 that Edwards would host another Barry & Enright game, Play the Percentages.

== Gameplay ==
In this game, three contestants viewed videos of celebrities, all of them talking about different subjects, and the contestants had to buzz-in and identify what subject they were talking about. Correct answers won money for the players according to how long the video was played, while incorrect answers disqualified a contestant from answering for the remainder of that round. The value of each round started at $150, and decreased by $50 for every 1/3 of videotape it took to take a guess. The first player to reach $200 or more won the game, with all players keeping their money.

=== Short Subjects ===
The winner played "Short Subjects", in which 15-second videotapes of celebrities were shown one by one. Unlike the main game, there was no penalty for an incorrect answer, and contestants could buzz-in and answer as much as they wanted on each clip. Each correct answer won the same amount of money won in the main game, and solving five subjects won an extra $1,000.

Later in the run, Short Subjects was eliminated in favor of giving contestants who won three consecutive games a new car and a handful of cash; however, the car was not won until the final week of the series.

== Theme ==
A slightly different arrangement of the theme music for the show was used for a later Barry & Enright game, Hollywood Connection, which aired four years later in syndication.

== Episode status ==
As of 2026, is not clear if all sixty-five of the episodes exist. The studio master tape of the March 26 premiere is known to exist and the March 28, April 2, and April 9 episodes have also surfaced. The remaining sixty-one episodes are unaccounted for, and host Geoff Edwards was quoted as saying he believed they disappeared “into thin air”. Although CBS did begin scaling back their use of wiping to save videotape beginning in 1972, some game shows that aired on the network after Hollywood’s Talking also have uncertain statuses (such as Musical Chairs, Gambit, and the daytime edition of Tic-Tac-Dough).
