= John C. Mula =

American art director and production designer

John C. Mula (December 31, 1942 – February 25, 2018) was an American art director and production designer known for his work on television shows, including Barney Miller, Charles in Charge, and Boy Meets World. In 1991, Mula won a Primetime Emmy Award for art direction for his work on the ABC and Jim Henson Productions comedic television series, Dinosaurs.

Mula was born on December 31, 1942, in Brooklyn, New York. His career in television art director began on the set of the game show The Joker's Wild in 1972. Mula worked on the production of a variety of television game shows during the 1970s and 1980s, including Family Feud, Liar's Club, Win, Lose or Draw, Tic-Tac-Dough, Break the Bank, and Face the Music.

John Mula worked on the set design of the ABC police sitcom, Barney Miller, for the series' first six seasons from 1975 to 1980. He then worked on Charles in Charge from 1984 until 1990 from seasons one through five, as well as its transition to syndication.

John C. Mula died on February 25, 2018, in Fort Lauderdale, Florida, at the age of 75 following a short illness. He was survived by his husband, Sergio, and two daughters, Joanna and Jodi.
