= The Reel Game =

American television game show

- Genre: Game show
- Directed by: Marty Pasetta
- Creative director: Gene Lukowski (technical director)
- Presented by: Jack Barry
- Announcer: Jack Clark
- Country of origin: United States
- Original language: English
- No. of seasons: 1
- No. of episodes: 16

Production
- Producers: Ken Johnson; John Macker
- Running time: 30 minutes each
- Production companies: Jack Barry Productions; Four Star Television; ABC

Original release
- Network: ABC
- Release: January 18 – May 3, 1971

The Reel Game is an American game show that aired on Monday nights on ABC from January 18 to May 3, 1971. The series was hosted by Jack Barry and announced by Jack Clark.

This show marked Barry's return to producing shows for national television after his 13-year hiatus from television after the quiz show scandals of the 1950s.

== Gameplay ==
Three contestants competed in a quiz game in which the answers come from film clips.

The contestants were given $250 to start, then they were given a subject after which they wagered any part of their current score (all wagers had to made in $25 increments). Once the bets were placed, host Barry posed a question, after which the contestants wrote down their answers. When the answers were written down, a film clip was shown to reveal the correct answer. When the clip was finished, the contestants then showed their answers. A correct answer won the contestant the amount wagered whereas an incorrect answer deducted the wager.

=== $25 Toss-up round ===
Four film clips were played and after each one, host Barry read three toss-up questions in which players buzz-in to answer. A correct answer added $25 to the player's score, while an incorrect incurred no penalty, but gave the other players a chance to answer.

==== Celebrity toss-up ====
After the fourth clip was played, a celebrity from that clip came in to ask the three toss-up questions. Correct answers were still worth $25.

=== Grand finale ===
In the Grand Finale one last film clip was played but without toss-ups. For this round, the bets were written in secret by the players before writing down their answers, after the final question was asked. Then the film clip was shown with the correct answer to the question. When the clip was finished, the players showed their bets & answers.

All players kept their cash, but the player with the most money won the game and returned the following week to play again. Players who went broke at the end of the game were always guaranteed $25.

== Episode status ==
Copies of three episodes are known to exist: the 1970 pilot, the March 8 episode, and the Finale. All three are held by the UCLA Film and Television Archive; however, the Finale has also been found among private collectors.

In June 2024, the premiere episode was found on audio tape.
