= The Doris Day Show (radio program) =

American old-time radio musical program

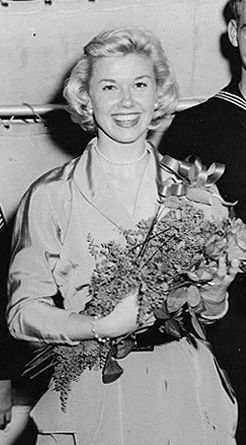
- Doris Day (about a year before her radio program)
- Genre: Musical
- Running time: 30 minutes
- Country of origin: United States
- Language: English
- Syndicates: CBS
- Starring: Doris Day
- Announcer: Don Wilson; Johnny Jacobs; Roy Rowan
- Directed by: Sam Pierce
- Produced by: Sam Pierce
- Original release: March 28, 1952 – May 26, 1953
- Opening theme: "It's Magic"
- Sponsored by: Rexall; CBS-Columbia

The Doris Day Show was an American old-time radio musical program. It was broadcast on CBS from March 28, 1952, to May 26, 1953.

== Format ==
Star Doris Day's singing highlighted the show, and each episode usually featured a guest star.

The program was sponsored initially by and later by the Rexall drug company as a summer replacement for Amos 'n' Andy. It was later sponsored by CBS-Columbia, Incorporated, the manufacturing subsidiary of CBS.

"It's Magic" was the theme.

== Personnel ==
As the show's title implies, Doris Day was the star. Les Brown and his orchestra provided instrumental music. The announcers were Don Wilson, Johnny Jacobs and Roy Rowan. Sam Pierce was the producer and director.
