= Bumper Stumpers =

Canadian television game show

- Bumper Stumpers title card
- Genre: Game show
- Created by: Wink Martindale
- Developed by: Mark Maxwell-Smith
- Directed by: William G. Elliott
- Presented by: Al Dubois
- Announcer: Ken Ryan
- Composer: Ed Lojeski
- Country of origin: Canada
- No. of seasons: 3

Production
- Executive producers: Dan Enright; Wink Martindale
- Producer: Doug Gahm
- Production locations: Global Television Studios; Toronto, Ontario
- Running time: 22–24 minutes
- Production companies: Global Television Network; Barry & Enright Productions; Wink Martindale Enterprises; USA Network

Original release
- Network: Global Television Network; USA Network
- Release: June 29, 1987 – December 28, 1990

Bumper Stumpers is a Canadian game show. Two teams of two players competed to decipher letter puzzles presented as fictional vanity licence plates.

The show was a joint production of Canada's Global Television Network and the United States' USA Network, in association with Barry & Enright Productions and Wink Martindale Enterprises. This was one of three original series that USA and Global co-produced in the 1980s, with a 1985 revival of Jackpot and 1986's The New Chain Reaction preceding it; of the three, Bumper Stumpers was the only one that was not a revival of a previous series, and was ordered by Global without a pilot.

Bumper Stumpers started taping on June 10, 1987, premiered on June 29, 1987, and aired concurrently on Global and USA until December 28, 1990. It was created by Wink Martindale, the second creation of his to make air (Headline Chasers, which Martindale launched in syndication in 1985 in the United States with himself as host, was the first) and developed by Mark Maxwell-Smith. Al Dubois, who at the time was a weather forecaster for Global, hosted the show with Ken Ryan serving as the announcer. The show was taped at the Global Television Studios in Toronto, Ontario and it was also the last USA Network game show to be taped in Canada.

Reruns of the series were seen on Global in Ontario and in syndication elsewhere in Canada from 1990 to 1995 and on Game Show Network in the United States in 1994–95 and 2000. Bumper Stumpers later aired on the Canadian specialty channel GameTV from October 1, 2012, until 2017, from January 8 to February 25, 2018, and again from February 4, 2019, to March 1, 2019.

== Main game ==
Bumper Stumpers featured two teams, one usually a returning champion pair. The teams' goal was to correctly solve the Super Stumper, a puzzle designed to resemble a vanity licence plate that consisted of seven spaces and was said at the beginning of each game to belong to someone or something. After host Dubois relayed that information to the teams, the first space in the Super Stumper was revealed.

Each space concealed either a letter or a number, which was only revealed after the team chose a space. In order to fill in the spaces, the teams played a series of toss ups with different vanity plates. For each toss up, two different plates were displayed, one of which fit a specific description. One team member would buzz in and select one of the two plates, and if correct his/her teammate got ten seconds to decipher it; if unsuccessful, the opposing team received ten seconds to guess. The first team to correctly decipher the plate selected a space on the Super Stumper to fill in.

If all seven spaces were filled and the team that filled the last one could not solve the Super Stumper, the opposing team was given one last chance to solve. If it was still unsolved after that, a speed-up round was played with a new Super Stumper. Control started with the team that gave the last correct answer, and they chose a space and were given five seconds. If they could not solve, the other team chose its own space to fill. The teams took turns filling in the blanks until one of them solved the Super Stumper.

The first team to solve the Super Stumper won the game. The first team to solve Two Super Stumpers won the match, along with CA$1,000, and advanced to the bonus round for a chance to win more money.

Originally, solving a Super Stumper won the team that did so CA$500 and the right to play the bonus round. If a Super Stumper went unsolved, the next one was played for an additional CA$500, and play continued in this manner until a Super Stumper was solved. Also, the team who correctly buzzed in first was able to play or pass; this was dropped relatively early in the run after many more contestants elected to play.

=== Plates ===
The writers on Bumper Stumpers had various methods they used to relay the necessary information to lead the contestants to how to read the plate.

For instance, a plate belonging to swashbucklers might read PYR88, with the solution being "pirates" ("pyr" + "eights"). Another plate belonging to Bill Cosby might read IIPI, with the solution being his television series I Spy ("I's" + "pi"). In both these cases, pairs of letters and numbers are read as plurals instead of “eighty-eight” or “eye-eye”. This was the case in most uses of pairs, but not all.

In other instances Roman numerals might be used, such as in the plate IVTHST8. This plate reads “fourth estate”, with the number four represented by the IV at the beginning of the plate. Any plate that had “H2O” in it would have something to do with water, as that is its chemical symbol.

Other plates simply required the contestants to figure out proper pronunciation, such as for the plate TPRT (tea party), CUNL (see you in Hell), or TYRDFHM (tired of him). In most cases the use of vowels implied that the long pronunciation of the letters was being sought, such as in the plates “ARAD” or “SPRARAD”, which translate to “air raid” and “spray Raid”.

== Bonus round ==
This show had three bonus rounds throughout the run.

=== Bonus round #1 ===
The first bonus round was split into two halves, with the objectives being different depending on the outcome of the first portion.

In the first half, the team was given 30 seconds to identify up to seven plates. Correctly doing so won the top prize of CA$2,000 and ended the round immediately. If the team fell short, they advanced to the second half of the round, "The Final Stumper," for a chance to win some money. This portion was played in two different ways.

==== Format #1 ====
The seven game board monitors each displayed a letter in the word “STUMPER”, and each letter concealed something underneath. For each plate the team correctly solved, money amounts were added to the board. The first amount added was CA$500, and depending on how many plates were solved up to five additional amounts would be added. CA$100 was added to the board first, CA$200 second, CA$300 third, CA$400 fourth, and an additional CA$500 space was added last. Any letter that did not receive a money amount instead concealed a stop sign.

The team could keep choosing as long as they kept revealing dollar amounts and could stop at any point. Revealing a stop sign ended the round and froze the team's winnings. If they managed to find at least $500, the money was doubled and the round ended. A team could win a maximum of $1,800 in this portion of the round (CA$100, CA$300, CA$500 = CA$900, multiplied by two).

==== Format #2 ====
In the second format, the goal became to accumulate $1,000 or more. This time, in addition to the five dollar amounts one of the letters in STUMPER hid a space marked “WIN.” That space was added first, then the rest of the dollar amounts.

If the team managed to accumulate $1,000 or more or find the WIN space, their bonus total was augmented to $2,000. This time, finding one of the stop signs cost the team all of their bonus winnings.

=== Bonus round #2 ===
In the second bonus round, the team was given 30 seconds and up to five plates to solve. They were required to solve four of them before time ran out. If they did so, they were rewarded with CA$200; otherwise, the round ended there and they won nothing additional.

If the team did correctly solve the necessary four plates, they were presented with a chance to take their winnings and quit or risk the money to try and double it by solving another plate. If they decided to take the risk, they were shown the plate and given seven seconds to solve it.

Up to three additional plates could be played, and the team could win up to CA$1,600 for correctly solving all three. They could also stop at any time and take their winnings, and the same double-or-nothing principle was in play for every word.

=== Bonus round #3 ===
The third Bumper Stumpers bonus round consisted of a series of five plates connected to a subject, with each plate serving as a clue to the subject's identity.

This time, only one player from the winning team played the first half of the round. That player was given 30 seconds to decipher the plates, with CA$100 given for each. Unlike the previous bonus round formats, Dubois did not give out clues to the plates. After the time was up, the player was given a choice: either stop with whatever money he/she had accumulated, or risk it to see if the other player, isolated backstage, could come up with the owner of the plates. If the team took the risk and the second player was able to identify the subject using the solved plates, the team's winnings would be tripled. Thus, the maximum amount a team could win was CA$1,500.

Winning teams could stay on the show until defeated or winning five matches. Under the original format, where the bonus round was played after each game rather than each match, a team could also be retired by being defeated twice in the front game.

== Tournament of Champions ==
Near the end of the show's run, airing on USA in September 1990 and repeated in December of that year, a "Tournament of Champions" was held, with 16 undefeated teams returning to compete. The winning team received an additional $10,000, while $5,000 was awarded to the runners-up.
