= Play the Percentages =

- Directed by: Richard S. Kline
- Presented by: Geoff Edwards
- Narrated by: Jay Stewart; Bob Hilton
- Theme music composer: Hal Hidey
- Country of origin: United States
- No. of seasons: 1
- No. of episodes: 130

Production
- Executive producer: Dan Enright
- Producer: Ron Greenberg
- Production locations: KCOP-TV/Chris-Craft Studios, Los Angeles, California
- Running time: approx. 22-26 Minutes
- Production company: Barry & Enright Productions

Original release
- Network: Syndicated
- Release: January 7 – September 12, 1980

Play the Percentages is an American game show hosted by Geoff Edwards which aired in syndication from January 7 to September 12, 1980. Jay Stewart announced for the first six weeks, after which Bob Hilton became the permanent announcer.

The game changed format several times over its short run, but all forms involved some variation on asking questions with percentage answers or statistics.

== Gameplay ==
=== Couples format ===
Two married couples competed. One contestant from each couple was asked to estimate what percentage of 300 people answered a specific question correctly. Whoever was closest to the actual percentage, high or low, scored the actual percentage points. If both contestants guessed the same percentage, either contestant was given the option to change their estimate.

The contestant who scored the points could then either answer the question (without conferring with his or her spouse) or challenge his or her opponent to answer. A right answer or a successful challenge added the remaining percentage points to the couple's score. For example, if 53% answered the question correctly, a team earned 53 points for the closer guess and could earn an additional 47 points from a correct answer to the question or a successful challenge.

If the contestant with the initial control missed the question, the opponent could steal the points. Originally, a successful challenge also allowed the contestant to answer the question for the same number of points. The first couple to reach 300 points won the game and $300.

Originally, if a team guessed the percentage exactly right, they won the game automatically. A week later, in addition to winning the game, the team won a cash jackpot that started originally at $25,000 and then $10,000 and increased by $1,000 for every game in which it went unclaimed. Any couple who won five consecutive games received a new car.

=== Solo contestant format ===
On March 3, 1980, the format was overhauled. Two individual contestants, one a returning champion, competed in a straight quiz. Three categories were in play in each game. Two of the categories were selected by the players before the game, with each player selecting one that they felt they knew the most about. The third category consisted of random general knowledge questions and was called Potluck.

A round started with a category being determined by a randomizer, and two questions were asked in that category. The challenger chose a value from ten to ninety points in ten point increments for the first question with the points based on the percentage of the people surveyed who answered the question incorrectly, rounded to the nearest ten. Answering correctly earned the challenger the points, but the champion could steal them if the challenger did not answer correctly. The second question was played the same way, but with the champion determining the value.

If one of the two preselected categories was chosen, both questions would be asked in turn. If Potluck was chosen, both questions were toss-ups and could be answered by either player by buzzing in. Later, every question became a toss-up.

The first contestant to reach 250 points won the game and $500 and advanced to the bonus round. If there was no winner after five rounds, a final toss-up question decided the winner (the player who is in the lead getting to choose the category), who then advanced to the bonus round. Any contestant who won five consecutive games won a new car.

=== Bonus round ===
First format

The couple gave a target percentage that was larger than zero. The host read a question and three possible answers. One answer (usually the correct one) was the most popular and awarded the most points. Another choice was a less popular answer, and the third answer received no response and scored zero points. The couple chose an answer and scored points based on the percentage of the poll that also gave that response.

If the couple chose an answer which scored 0%, the bonus round ended immediately. The couple could also choose to end the bonus round at any time and take $10 per point earned. However, if a couple accumulated 100 points or more, the couple won $2,500. Also, if a couple chose an answer with a percentage that matched exactly the percentage stated at the start of the bonus round, the couple won a cash jackpot that started at $25,000 and increased by $1,000 each day.

Starting the week of January 14, the format was changed to remove the jackpot. Also, the couple was required to choose both scoring answers before moving to the next question.

Second format

Starting on the show’s fifth week, a single question was presented with a list of six possible answers. Five of the answers were given by the survey respondents, and one answer was not given. Contestants chose answers one-at-a-time, winning $10 per point or $2,500 for guessing all five actual responses and avoiding the answer with 0%. As before, selecting the answer with 0% ended the game and forfeited all bonus winnings up to that point. The $2,500 cash prize was later replaced with a prize package worth between $3,000 and $4,000 (which included $1,000 in cash).

When the format changed from couples to individual contestants, the champion was permitted to bring a spouse, other relative or friend onstage, but only for moral support—the champion was the only person who selected answers. (The supporter was permitted to suggest answers, but it was the champion's decision.)

To ensure that the percentage points in this format always added up to 100%, the points awarded were based on the percentage of the people who responded with that answer in relation to the five most popular answers of that survey, not the actual number of people who gave that answer.

From February 18 until the program's cancellation, the same prize package was at stake for the entire show until won.

== Episode status ==
USA Network reran the series from April 27, 1987, to June 23, 1989. Game Show Network has aired episodes sporadically over the years.
