= Brian Bedol =

American television executive

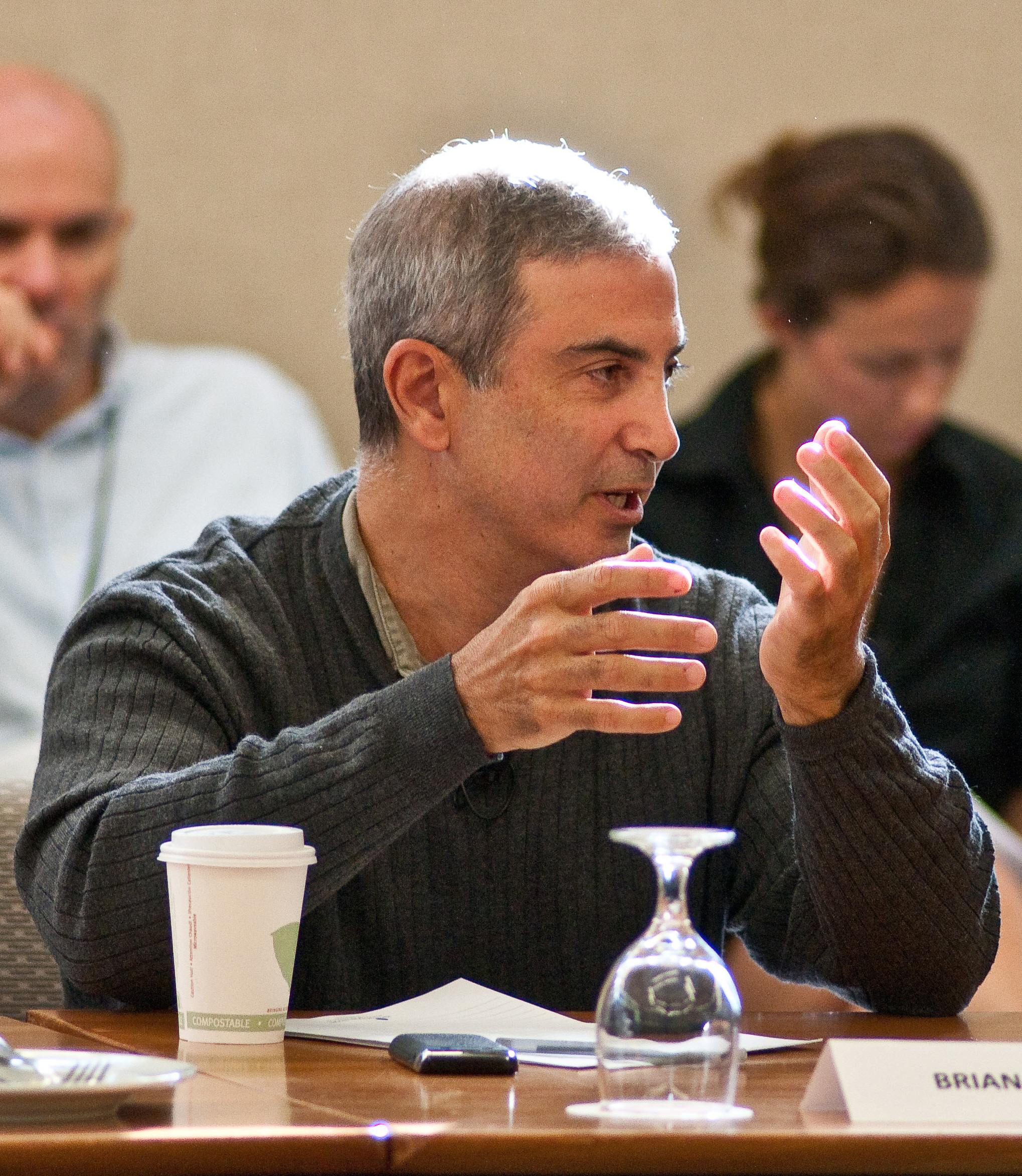
Brian Bedol at Fortune Brainstorm TECH at the Aspen Institute Campus, in July 2011

Brian Bedol is an American television executive, entrepreneur, and founder of the sports television channels Classic Sports Network and College Sports Television. Bedol owned CSN from 1995 to 1997 and CSTV from 2003 to 2006.

Bedol has since sold off both channels, to ESPN and CBS respectively, who have renamed the channels ESPN Classic and CBS Sports Network. He served as president and CEO of both companies. He left CSTV Networks in January, 2008. In 2009 he announced the formation of Bedrock Venture Partners to invest in early-stage media and technology businesses. In addition, in August 2010, Major League Soccer announced it had hired Bedol as a consultant to help the league determine what to do with its media rights. In 2012, he founded Bedrocket in partnership with Huffington Post co-founder Ken Lerer. Bedol currently serves as the company's president and CEO.

== Early career ==
Brian Bedol is a "maverick entrepreneur in an increasingly mature industry dominated by conglomerates", according to Mediaweek. He began his career as an advertising writer in Chicago writing McDonald's commercials, but soon after moved to New York as an on-air promotion producer for the not-yet-launched MTV. After returning to Harvard Business School he continued to work with MTV's parent company, Warner-Amex Satellite Entertainment, and during the summer of 1984 was part of a small team that developed the business concept for Nickelodeon's evening programming block, Nick at Nite. After receiving his MBA from Harvard University, Bedol joined MTV founder Bob Pittman, as a partner overseeing television and home video at Quantum Media Ventures, where he created and executive-produced the ground-breaking and controversial Morton Downey Jr. Show. He was also the creator and executive producer of the Fox Network's first reality show, Totally Hidden Video. His other television credits include creator and co-executive producer of the television game show Pictionary, hosted by Brian Robbins and creator of the 1990 Fox comedy show Haywire. He also executive produced the home video of Hagler vs. Leonard: The Superfight, the top-selling sports home video of the year.

While an executive at Quantum, Bedol, Pittman, and another partner, Mayo Stuntz, developed and launched Court TV with Steven Brill's American Lawyer Media. He also served on the board of directors of Quincy Jones Entertainment, the creator and producer of the hit television show, The Fresh Prince of Bel-Air. In 1986, Bedol, along with his partners, also led a secret effort to buy the J. Walter Thompson advertising agency. Although ultimately outbid by Martin Sorrell, Quantum had accumulated enough stock to earn over $10 million for two weeks of effort.

In 1990, Quantum was sold to Time Warner, and Bedol, Pittman, and Stuntz became the executive team for Time Warner Enterprises, the company's entrepreneurial ventures unit. The division's highest profile activity was its purchase of Six Flags Theme Parks from Wesray Capital Corporation, the pioneering leveraged buyout firm started by William E. Simon and Ray Chambers. Bedol joined the board of Six Flags, and oversaw the company's marketing, advertising, promotion, and creative operations. He developed the company's controversial national advertising strategy that compared Six Flags to Disneyland. During this period, Six Flags broke its all-time attendance and revenue records.

== Classic Sports Network ==
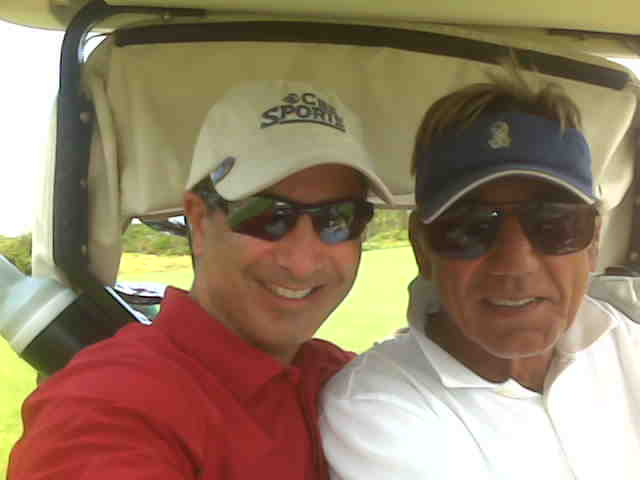
Brian Bedol and Joe Namath

He left Time Warner at the end of 1992 to strike out on his own. While working on the launch of Nick at Nite, Bedol wanted to show classic sporting events alongside the classic sitcoms. Convinced by his associates that this was a bad idea for Nick at Nite, he decided to resurrect it as a stand-alone channel over a decade later. In 1995, Bedol launched his "Nick at Nite of sports" creation, Classic Sports Network. Partnered with Stephen Greenberg, former Deputy Commissioner of Major League Baseball and son of Baseball Hall of Famer Hank Greenberg, the pair raised venture capital funding from Allen & Company, sports and business tycoon Wayne Huizenga, Paul Tudor Jones's Tudor Capital, and others. The network launched May 6, 1995 with a critically acclaimed programming stunt, "Float like a butterfly, sting like a bee, 24 hours of Muhammad Ali." Bedol and Greenberg successfully negotiated programming agreements with all of the major leagues, including the NFL, the NBA and Major League Baseball. They also licensed the boxing library of Bill Cayton that included many of the most important fights in boxing history, including those of Ali, Sonny Liston, Sugar Ray Robinson, Jack Dempsey, and Rocky Marciano. Additionally, they broadcast cult classics like Home Run Derby and the Joe Namath Show, a short-lived weekly variety show co-hosted by sportscaster Dick Schaap.

Unfortunately for the company, very few people could see the network. Because it was independently owned and not part of a media conglomerate, the roll-out of the network was slow. But Bedol persevered, and raised an additional $20 million from Warburg Pincus to keep the company afloat. An innovative marketer, Bedol recognized the value of using some of the greatest names in sports history to help grow the network. Since he couldn't afford to pay them in cash at the time, he formed the Classic Sports Network "Board of Champions", and gave each of its members a slice of equity in exchange for helping to promote the channel. The board's members included Joe Namath, Magic Johnson, Mary Lou Retton, Wilt Chamberlain, Gale Sayers, Ernie Banks, and Ted Williams.

The strategy was successful, and Classic Sports Network attracted a lot of attention and favorable publicity. It also attracted some unfavorable attention. After the company rejected Cablevision's approach to acquire the network in 1997, Cablevision decided to launch a competitive service called "American Sports Classics". In March, 1997, Bedol and Greenberg filed the first complaint with the Federal Communications Commission (FCC) under the 1992 Cable Act.

Bedol's aggressive response succeeded, as American Sports Classics never launched, and Classic Sports Network was sold to ESPN later that year for around $175 million. Bedol oversaw the integration and transition to ESPN Classic (originally ESPN Classic Sports), and left the company in early 1999.

== College Sports Television (CSTV) ==
After a hiatus of a few years where he was primarily an investor in early-stage media businesses (See Other Business Ventures), in 2002 Bedol announced that he was returning to the cable industry with a new network featuring primarily college sports, called (at the time) NCSN, or National College Sports Network. It was the first sports network that recognized the power of sports to help promote the cable industry's recently introduced digital programming tiers. Bedol was quoted as saying "It's a marketing tool disguised as a programming service.

Similar to the Classic Sports strategy, CSTV acquired the television and internet rights to thousands of collegiate sporting events from over a dozen athletic conferences, including the Big Ten, the Southeastern Conference, and Conference USA.

Although the events CSTV acquired were not big enough for ESPN or Fox Sports, Bedol was one of the first media executives to recognize the value that could be created from aggregating niches using the internet. CSTV brought the long-tail theory to the internet. The creation of CSTV led to Bedol's selection by Sports Business Journal as one of the "20 Most Powerful People in College Athletics" in 2004.

Later that year, acquired the internet sports division from Student Advantage. This became the centerpiece of the broadband distribution strategy that set apart from all the other players in sports, and established the company as a pioneer in the broadband distribution of live sports. This led to the selecting to distribute the national Men's Basketball Championship over the internet in 2005. The tournament has since become the internet's largest annual online sporting event.

Business Week named Bedol to its list of Best Leaders of 2005, Sports Business Journal named him one of the 20 most influential people in online sports, and Sporting News named him to its "Power 100" list.

CSTV was acquired by CBS in 2006 for $325 million, and Bedol was named the president and CEO of the division.

== Bedrocket and Sportsrocket ==
In 2012, Bedol founded Bedrocket, to invest in, and incubate, digital media properties. Through Bedrocket, Bedol co-founded NowThis News with Ken Lerer. Bedrocket also incubated Sportsrocket, a provider of strategy, technology, and operations to sports rights holders. Sportsrocket created KickTV, in partnership with Major League Soccer, and helped build it into the leading YouTube channel for North American soccer fans. KickTV was sold to Copa90 in 2015. The company also created and operates Network A, a leading global, multi-platform action sports property.

Bedrocket has also collaborated on several projects including the digital destination, Flama, with Univision, the first comedy channel on Spotify, Mike Birbiglia's film Sleepwalk With Me and an interactive interview with Jon Hamm for ESPN.

== Other business ventures ==
Bedol also helped pioneer the trend of sports teams owning their own regional sports networks. As a minority shareholder in the New Jersey Nets, he was a central participant in the negotiation of the deal that led to the formation of YankeeNets, the co-ownership of the New York Yankees and the Nets. He also worked very closely with Allen & Company to develop the media strategy and structure that led to the launch of the YES Network.

He also was head of the American-based venture capital group Fusient Media Ventures; Fusient is known primarily for an aborted deal to purchase World Championship Wrestling in 2001. In October 2010, he joined the Series A round financing of ticket management software firm Spotlight Ticket Management.

Bedol earned his bachelor's degree from Boston University, and received an MBA from the Harvard Business School.
