= Rick Zumwalt =

American arm-wrestler and actor (1951–2003)

- Born: Richard Lee Zumwalt Jr. September 24, 1951; St. Louis, Missouri U.S
- Died: March 19, 2003 (aged 51); Desert Hot Springs, California U.S.
- Occupations: Actor, Professional arm-wrestler
- Years active: 1987–2003

Richard Lee Zumwalt Jr. (September 24, 1951 – March 19, 2003) was an American professional arm-wrestler and actor. He is known for playing the character of Bob "Bull" Hurley in the 1987 Sylvester Stallone movie Over the Top.

== Career ==
In addition to his role in Over the Top, Zumwalt appeared in several other films. In 1988, he had a small but memorable role fighting Sean Connery in a bar in The Presidio. In 1992, he played a tattooed strongman, one of the Penguin's henchmen, in Batman Returns.

Zumwalt also appeared on TV. He co-starred as "Judge Mental" on the kids' gameshow Pictionary and also had a supporting role in a 1990 episode of Night Court.

In the mid-1990s, Zumwalt began appearing as a strongman in the popular theatrical production Alegría by Cirque du Soleil.

Zumwalt guest starred on Perfect Strangers in the episode titled: """Eyewitless Report"""

Zumwalt became an alcoholic in his early thirties. Ten years later, he became an active member in a clean and sober fellowship and spent a great deal of time and effort serving others suffering from substance abuse.

== Death ==
According to his former wife, he died on March 19, 2003, after suffering a major heart attack.

== Partial filmography ==
- Over the Top (1987) - Bob "Bull" Hurley
- Disorderlies (1987) - Huge Cop
- Penitentiary III (1987) - Joshua
- The Presidio (1988) - Bully in Bar
- The Big Turnaround (1988) - Turk
- Criminal Act (1989) - Tiny
- Liberty & Bash (1989) - Ace
- Rockula (1990) - Boom Boom
- Ragin' Cajun (1990) - Lou
- Perfect Strangers (1990)
- Missing Pieces (1991) - Mountain Man
- Prime Target (1991) - Potsy
- Under Surveillance (1991) - Doorman
- Batman Returns (1992) - Tattooed Strongman
- Father Hood (1993) - Burly Guy
- Full House (1993) - Leonard Schulz (Season 7, episode 11: "The Bicycle Thief")
- In Quiet Night (1998) - Prisoner
- I Love You, But (1998) - Coach Andrews
- Skippy (2001) - Biker with Bandana (final film role)
