= Life Begins at Eighty =

American radio and television panel discussion series

- Genre: Radio and television panel show
- Presented by: Jack Barry
- Country of origin: United States
- Original language: English

Production
- Running time: 25 minutes

Original release
- Network: Radio: Mutual (1948-1949); ABC (1952-1953) Television: NBC (1950); ABC (1950–52); DuMont (1952–55); ABC (1955–56)
- Release: July 4, 1948 – February 25, 1956

Life Begins at Eighty, also stylized as Life Begins at 80, is an American radio (and later television) panel discussion series which aired from July 1948 to February 1956.

== Broadcast history ==
=== Radio ===
Prior to its television run, the show had an initial run on radio from July 4, 1948 until September 24, 1949 on the Mutual radio network. It also had a second run on radio from October 1, 1952 until May 6, 1953 on ABC radio.

Both the radio and the television versions of the show were hosted by Jack Barry, and consisted of viewers at home writing questions for the octogenarian panel to answer. There were usually four panelists; the two permanent spots on the panel were given to Broadway actress Georgiana Carhart, and Fred Stein, cousin of writer and poet Gertrude Stein.

=== Television ===
The television version premiered several months after the radio show ended its initial run in 1949. It first aired on NBC on January 13, 1950, running until August 1950. It then aired on ABC from October 1950 to March 1952, then on DuMont from March 21, 1952, to July 24, 1955, and finally back on ABC from August 1955 to February 25, 1956. At the beginning of its Fall 1955 run on ABC, Life Begins at Eighty was aired opposite two anthology series, Appointment with Adventure on CBS and The Loretta Young Show on NBC.

Life Begins at Eighty was a spin-off of the popular panel discussion series Juvenile Jury, in which young children answered questions from the viewers at home. A follow-up panel show, Wisdom of the Ages, solicited opinions from a range of ages and ran on DuMont from December 6, 1952 to June 30, 1953.

The series was parodied in a Sesame Street game show sketch starring Guy Smiley titled, Happiness Begins at 40.

A pilot for a possible revival was taped in 1991, with Shadoe Stevens as host, but did not sell.

== Episode status ==
One episode is in the collection of the Paley Center for Media, and two episodes are held in the J. Fred MacDonald collection at the Library of Congress.

== See also ==
- List of programs broadcast by the DuMont Television Network
- List of surviving DuMont Television Network broadcasts
