= Paul Taubman =

American economist

Paul James Taubman (1939 – 1995) was an American economist who taught at the University of Pennsylvania. He conducted a prominent twin study on the heritability of income, which was published in 1976. This study has been cited as a pioneering one in the field of genoeconomics. Subsequently, Arthur Goldberger published a paper critiquing Taubman's study, noting that heritability estimates were highly sensitive to assumptions about the degree of overlap between genetic and environmental variables. During the 1970s, Taubman also researched the effect of schooling on individual earnings among World War II veterans.

== Biography ==
Taubman received his Ph.D. from the University of Pennsylvania. He became an assistant professor at Harvard University in 1964, and left Harvard to become a staff member of the Council of Economic Advisers in 1965. He served as an associate professor at the University of Pennsylvania from 1966 until 1972, when he was promoted to full professor there. He was elected a fellow of the Econometric Society in 1977. He continued to serve as professor of economics at the University of Pennsylvania until his death on May 4, 1995.
