= Pictionary (2022 game show) =

2022 American game show

- Genre: Game show
- Directed by: Hans Van Riet
- Presented by: Jerry O'Connell
- Announcer: Natalie Peyser; Tammi Mac; Headkrack
- Country of origin: United States
- Original language: English
- No. of seasons: 3
- No. of episodes: 537

Production
- Executive producers: David A. Hurwitz; Noah Bonnett; Richard Brown
- Production locations: Quixote Studios (season 1–2); Georgia Public Broadcasting (season 3)
- Running time: 19 minutes
- Production companies: Fox First Run; Bill's Market & Television Production; Mattel Television; CBS Media Ventures

Original release
- Network: First-run syndication
- Release: September 12, 2022 – May 30, 2025

Pictionary is an American television game show based on the board game of the same name hosted by Jerry O'Connell that premiered in first-run syndication on September 12, 2022 and concluded on May 30, 2025.

== Production ==
In December 2021, Deadline reported that after a successful test run in the summer, the show would get a full season on Fox Television Stations and other stations in fall 2022. The show is produced by Fox First Run and Bill Market & Television Production in association with Mattel Television and distributed by CBS Media Ventures (successor of Worldvision Enterprises, which previously distributed the 1997 version of the show). In May 2022, it was reported that in the show cleared in 90% of the country. On Fox-owned stations, Pictionary joined programming blocks that include Fox First Run’s You Bet Your Life with Jay Leno and 25 Words or Less hosted by Meredith Vieira.

In January 2023, it was announced that the show along with 5 other shows were renewed for the 2023–24 television season by Fox First Run which premiered on September 11, 2023.

In July 2024, it was announced that the show would return for season 3 starting September 9 of the same year.

In January 2025, it was announced that Pictionary was cancelled after three seasons by Fox First Run.

== Gameplay ==
With the other two Pictionary game shows, they mostly kept the same rules and gameplay, but in this version, they made their own rules.

=== Quick Draw ===
Seasons 1-2 only. The show starts with a quick draw for 100 points. A video is shown of someone drawing an item. Contestants have to buzz in when they know the answer.

=== Sketch or Steal ===
Teams alternate with each other drawing images of answers. One member draws while their two teammates must give the correct answer in 15 seconds for 100 points. If they don't, the other team gets a chance to steal the points. This goes for two rounds and in the second round, answers are worth 200 points.

=== Choose Your Words ===
During the commercial break, each team chooses three words for their opponents to draw; their goal is to choose words that will trip the other team up. Each team gets 60 seconds to draw all three words, and each word is worth 1,000 points. Words are allowed to be passed, and will be drawn again if time allows.

Whichever team with the highest score advances to the bonus round. In case of a tie, a sudden death word will be drawn, and whichever team guesses it correctly advances.

=== Final Sketch ===
The winning team chooses a player from their team to draw. They are given five classic Pictionary words or phrases; they will pick and draw any three of these five to draw in 45 seconds. The first two are worth $1,000 a piece and if the team gets 3 correct answers in 45 seconds, they win $2,000 and a trip. (The destination is announced at the beginning of the show.)

== Reception ==
Stephanie Morgan of Common Sense Media gave the show 2 out of 5 stars, calling it a bland game show and comparing it unfavorably to Hollywood Game Night and ending her review saying "Considering there's a whole host of better celebrity game show options out there, this is one to skip."

== Ratings ==
The shows' Nielson rating was a 0.5/4 for the second straight week in January 2023.

== Streaming ==
The series is available for free online through Fox's own Tubi, Pluto TV, and the show's channel on YouTube.

== International versions ==
Country	Title	Air date	Network	Production companies	Host	Top prize
United Kingdom	Pictionary	23 December 2024 – 5 February 2025	ITV	Whisper North in association with Paramount Global Content Distribution	Mel Giedroyc	£1,000 and a trip
United States [original version]	Pictionary	12 September 2022 – 30 May 2025	syndication	Fox First Run and Bill Market & Television Production in association with Mattel Television and CBS Media Ventures	Jerry O'Connell	$2,000 and a trip

== See also ==
- Pictionary
- Pictionary (1989 game show) - There was an early child version of Pictionary during the late 1980s, but with different rules.
- Pictionary (1997 game show) - The second version hosted by Alan Thicke, has its own rules different from the new version.
- Win, Lose or Draw, a similar game show also produced by Richard S. Kline
