= Dan Enright =

American television producer

- Born: Daniel Ehrenreich; August 30, 1917; New York City, New York, U.S.
- Died: May 22, 1992 (aged 74); Santa Monica, California, U.S.
- Occupation: Television producer
- Years active: 1942–1991
- Spouse: Stella Enright
- Partner: Susan Stafford (1983-1992)
- Children: 2

Daniel Enright (né Ehrenreich; August 30, 1917 – May 22, 1992) was an American television producer, primarily of game shows. Enright worked with Jack Barry from the 1940s until Barry's death in 1984. They were partners in creating programs for radio and television. Their company was called Barry & Enright Productions.

Enright, who grew up in British Palestine and New York City, met Barry when the latter was working in stand-up comedy. After a stint at WOR radio, they developed several early TV shows, including the seminal "interactive" show Winky Dink and You, as well as Juvenile Jury, Life Begins at Eighty, and Wisdom of the Ages.

The duo produced network game shows in the 1950s, including Back That Fact, You're on Your Own, Tic-Tac-Dough, Twenty-One, Concentration and Dough Re Mi.

== Quiz show scandal ==
Capitalizing on the success of the 1950s big-money quiz The $64,000 Question on CBS, Barry and Enright developed their flagship show, Twenty-One, a quiz which had a scoring system based loosely on blackjack. Contestants were placed in twin isolation booths and asked questions ranging in value from one to 11 points — the higher the point value, the more difficult the question. Enright described the initial broadcast of Twenty-One as "a dismal failure. It was just plain dull." Contestants repeatedly missed questions and, in Enright's own words, "It lacked all drama; it lacked all suspense. The next morning the sponsor (Geritol) called my partner, Jack Barry, and me and told us in no uncertain terms that he never wanted to see a repeat of what happened the previous night. And from that moment on, we decided to rig Twenty-One." Even with rigging, initial ratings were unimpressive.

Enright believed they needed to find heroes and villains — contestants the audience would either root for or root against. Though not illegal at the time, Enright and his assistant producer Albert Freedman went beyond merely finding appealing players by actually manipulating them: providing certain contestants with answers in advance, and scripting games and the players' mannerisms in the isolation booth. It was a process the producers duplicated for Tic-Tac-Dough.

Enright's most famous contestant protégé was Twenty-One's Charles Van Doren, who went on to win for 14 weeks and became a cover subject for Time, thus causing the show's popularity to soar. Van Doren replaced Herb Stempel, who himself had been given answers over his extended run on the show, but was eventually forced to lose (so that the more telegenic Van Doren might replace him). After waiting for Enright to fulfill his promise of a job in exchange for throwing the match, Stempel realized it would never come and went to the authorities. Only when other contestants came forward about game show rigging did they take Stempel seriously.

As the press was publishing allegations by former contestants of quiz rigging, NBC purchased from Barry and Enright the shows Twenty-One and Tic-Tac-Dough, along with two new daytime entries, Concentration and a musical quiz Dough Re Mi, all of which aired on NBC, for $1 million. Eventually the truth came out, and Enright admitted to rigging the show and giving contestants the questions and answers in advance.

As Twenty-One's emcee and co-producer, Jack Barry did not directly rig the shows himself (even quiz-show scandal investigator Joseph Stone questioned his involvement, and Herb Stempel has said in interviews that he believes Enright hid the rigging from Barry until it was exposed), yet he admitted in interviews given in the 1970s and 1980s his role in covering up the rigging for Enright.

== Exile ==
Barry and Enright's careers went into eclipse after the scandal broke, though Barry did get some hosting and acting gigs and briefly collaborated on projects with game show packager Goodson-Todman Productions. Barry purchased a radio station in Redondo Beach, California, and in 1969 he made his first network comeback as an emcee, replacing Dennis Wholey on a short-lived prime-time game, The Generation Gap on ABC. Two years later he sold his first post-scandal game show, also to ABC, called The Reel Game, which he emceed as well.

Slowly, Enright managed to work his way back into television, having to go to Canada to do so, working first at his new company Aladan Productions in 1959, then at Screen Gems in 1964. He was a producer of the early-70s syndicated game show All About Faces with Richard Hayes. Barry and Enright collaborated on other small Canadian-produced quiz shows including Line 'em Up, Photo Finish shot in Montreal, and It's a Match which was taped in Toronto. It was on these shows that a number of young American and Canadian producers and directors got their start, including John Kastner, Sidney M. Cohen, Mark Phillips and Jay Wolpert.

== Return to success ==
In 1972, after two failed attempts to sell a pilot, CBS bought from Barry the game show that would permanently revive his career as a host and producer: The Joker's Wild. One of the original pilots of The Joker's Wild was produced in 1969 during Barry's collaboration with Mark Goodson and Bill Todman and was emceed by Allen Ludden. Although credited as "A Jack Barry Production", there had been speculation that ex-partner Enright was somehow involved with the show, and indeed Enright was credited as executive producer in the show's final year on CBS. Nonetheless, Joker proved to be a success. In 1974, after working for a decade at Screen Gems, he returned to Jack Barry's company which was later reincorporated as a new version of the Barry & Enright company. In 1975 it was canceled by CBS but reruns of Joker did so well on local Los Angeles and New York TV stations that in 1977 a whole new series was produced for syndication. The syndicated Joker ran until 1986 (with Bill Cullen succeeding Barry after his death).

By 1977, Barry and Enright had resumed their partnership full-time. In the spring of 1976 they sold a revival of Break the Bank to ABC. Despite promising early ratings, the daytime network version hosted by Tom Kennedy was canceled. A weekly first-run syndication version aired from September 1976 to September 1977, hosted by co-packager Barry.

Barry and Enright later found their longest-lasting success with syndicated versions of Joker and the revived Tic-Tac-Dough with Wink Martindale and, later, Jim Caldwell hosting.

In early 1981, Enright started a seven-year relationship with Bullseye's all-time cash and prize winner, former child actress Donna Birke (née Boyce), who had appeared on Bullseye in 1980. The two shared a penthouse apartment in Century City, then in Marina del Rey from 1985 through 1987, when they separated. Enright reportedly paid Boyce $276,000 in a quasi-"palimony" settlement at the time of their separation.

== Ventures in film ==
In 1981, Barry and Enright crossed over into the field of motion picture production with the release of their first film, Private Lessons, a coming-of-age comedy featuring erotic film star Sylvia Kristel.

== Later years and death ==
Following Jack Barry's sudden death in 1984, Enright continued to run Barry & Enright Productions completely, retaining the B&E name, as opposed to renaming the company "Dan Enright Productions." Barry's death resulted in the departure of key Barry & Enright figures, including producers Ron Greenberg and Gary Cox and director Richard S. Kline, all three of whom were not in favor of Enright taking over the company. Kline went on to form his own production company, Greenberg returned to producing his own programs, and Cox joined Reg Grundy Productions in 1985.

Enright went on to produce a few other game shows on his own, including Bumper Stumpers (a joint venture with Wink Martindale Productions, which taped in Canada and aired on USA Network) and a short-lived revival of Tic-Tac-Dough, as well as a few projects with former Wheel of Fortune co-host Susan Stafford, who was then Vice President of Public Relations for Barry & Enright Productions. Enright and Stafford shared a penthouse in Santa Monica, California.

Enright died of cancer on May 22, 1992, at age 74, and was buried at the Forest Lawn, Hollywood Hills Cemetery in Los Angeles.

He was survived by his wife, Stella, and two children: daughter Erica, and son Don.
