= Break the Bank (1976 game show) =

- Genre: Game Show
- Directed by: Richard S. Kline
- Presented by: Tom Kennedy (ABC); Jack Barry (Syndicated)
- Announcer: Johnny Jacobs (ABC); Ernie Anderson (ABC & Syndicated)
- Theme music composer: Stuart Levin
- Country of origin: United States
- No. of episodes: 104

Production
- Producer: Dan Enright
- Production locations: ABC Television Center; Hollywood, California
- Running time: 22–26 minutes
- Production company: Barry & Enright Productions

Original release
- Network: ABC (1976); Syndicated (1976–77)
- Release: April 12, 1976 – September 11, 1977

Break the Bank is an American game show created by Jack Barry and Dan Enright and produced by their production company, Barry & Enright Productions. It was the first game show packaged by Barry and Enright as a tandem since their fall from grace following the 1950s quiz show scandals.

The show aired in the spring and summer of 1976 as an ABC daytime series hosted by Tom Kennedy, and in weekly syndication during the 1976–1977 season, hosted by creator-producer Barry.

== Game play ==
Break the Bank featured nine celebrities, and pitted one male and one female contestant against one another (similar to The Hollywood Squares). The contestants took turns calling out numbers on a large board with 20 numbered trilons, laid out in four rows of five. The celebrities sat in positions along the top and left edges of the board, so that every number was in one celebrity's row and another's column.

=== Board ===
- Money Box: There were three sets of three money boxes; each box in a set was horizontally and/or vertically connected to its neighbor(s). The daytime show used values of $100–$200–$300, while the syndicated run used $100–$300–$500.
- Wild Card: Only one was on the board, identified by a large "W" on a rainbow background. Once claimed, it could be used to count as any dollar amount or a Money Bag.
- Money Bag: Five were scattered across the board, not necessarily connected to each other. If a money bag was uncovered, the contestant could keep it (and end his/her turn) or reject it and select another box. Collecting three money bags, or two bags and the Wild Card, broke the bank for an automatic win.
- Blank: Five of these were hidden on the board, not touching each other. A contestant's turn ended if he/she uncovered a blank.

When either a money box or the Wild Card was uncovered, a question was asked to the two celebrities connected to that number. Both of them gave an answer, but only one was correct. (On rare occasions, both celebrities would give a bluff answer, forcing the question to be discarded for a new one.) If a contestant chose the correct answer, he/she claimed the box (marked with the proper symbol, a mustache for the male contestant or a pair of lips for the female contestant) and kept control; if not, his/her turn ended. Originally, a space would return to a neutral position when the contestant missed a question. The rules were later changed to speed up gameplay by awarding it to the opponent unless it would lead to a win by default.

=== Winning ===
There were two ways to win a game:

- Claiming three money boxes of the same value, or two matching boxes and the Wild Card, awarded triple the amount ($300, $600, $900, or $1,500) and a bonus prize.
- Claiming three money bags (or two and the Wild Card) broke the bank, winning the contestant a jackpot of cash and/or prizes. On the ABC version the bank was a progressive cash jackpot starting at $5,000 and increasing by $500 (later $250) per game until won. On the syndicated version, the bank was a prize package worth at least $10,000, always including a car, and did not increase from one game to the next. The bank could be broken more than once on any given episode, depending on how quickly games progressed.

On the ABC version, champions stayed either until defeated or until they surpassed the network's winnings limit of $20,000. However, champions were allowed to keep up to $25,000. In addition, the first contestant could win the game before the opponent had the chance to select a number. When this happened, the opponent remained on the show for the next game.

On the syndicated version, whoever broke the bank first won the match and advanced to the bonus round. If no one broke the bank before time ran out, the player who had won more games was declared the winner. Both players kept their winnings from individual games. If time ran short at the start of a game or while one was in progress, the host stopped asking questions and the players took turns choosing one number at a time; the first to uncover three of a kind won.

=== Bonus round ===
The bonus round was only played on the syndicated version and was similar to such rounds on other Barry and Enright games. Each celebrity held a card, eight with various amounts of money (in $100 increments from $200 to $1,000) and one that read "BUST." The contestant selected one celebrity at a time, and had the option to stop at any time and keep the total of all the revealed amounts. The round ended if the contestant either found the "BUST" card, which forfeited the accumulated money, or reached a total of $2,000 or more, in which case his/her winnings were increased to $5,000.

== Broadcast history ==
Break the Bank had two separate runs on American television. The first was as a daily series that aired from April 12 to July 23, 1976, on ABC, airing at 2:30 p.m. Eastern/1:30 Central. Although the series was popular, the network canceled it in order to expand the soap operas One Life to Live and General Hospital, both of which followed it on the daytime schedule, from 30 minutes to 45 minutes. The show quickly returned as a weekly syndicated game from September 18, 1976, to September 11, 1977.

On the daytime show, games straddled episodes, meaning that game play would stop when time ran out and would be completed on the next episode. On the syndicated version, each episode was self-contained due to syndication practices of the era; two contestants competed for the entire episode, with multiple games per show, and the contestant who broke the bank first or won the most games became champion and played the bonus round. If time ran short in the middle of a game, the contestants alternated choosing squares without questions, and the first contestant to get three of anything won.

== International versions ==
Country	Title	Broadcaster(s)	Presenter(s)	Premiere	Finale
Greece	Εσεіς זi λέזε Eseís zi léze Τηλεμπλόφες; Tilemplofes	ERT (1987–1988); Mega Channel (1989–1990)	Kostas Rigopoulous; Vasilis Tsivilikas	20 September 1987 (ERT); 25 November 1989 (Mega)	19 June 1988 (ERT); 1990 (Mega)

== Home edition ==
Milton Bradley released a home edition of the game in 1977. The rules and materials were based on the syndicated version of the show, with the $100–$300–$500 cash cards and the Bonus Round. Basic gameplay had three players participate in three full games, each taking a turn as emcee and two as a contestant, with the player who won the most money being named overall champion.
