= Genoeconomics =

Interdisciplinary field of molecular genetics and economics

Genoeconomics is an interdisciplinary field of protoscience that aims to combine molecular genetics and economics. It is based on the idea that economic indicators have a genetic basis—that a person's financial behaviour can be traced to their DNA and that genes are related to economic behaviour. As of 2023, the results were inconclusive. Some minor correlations may have been identified between genetics and economic preferences.

== History ==
The word "genoeconomics" was coined in 2007.

The field of economics and the economic indicators used by economists predate the empiricist age. Genoeconomics adds biological foundations to these traditional economic indicators.

Quantitative genetic data was not available to researchers until the year 2000, when the human genome was sequenced as part of the Human Genome Project. Genetic milestones of the late 20th and early 21st century, such as the sequencing of the human genome, have spurred interest in research combining economics and genetics.

== Background ==
Genoeconomics involves the study of single-nucleotide polymorphisms (SNPs). The field of genoeconomics uses genetic data to infer economic preferences such as time preference, risk aversion, and educational attainment, as well as macroeconomic data such as per-capita income. For example, genoeconomic methodology was used in a 2012 study of tobacco taxes in the United States, where such taxes vary across jurisdictions, to look at "the interaction of a single nicotinic receptor and state-level tobacco taxes to predict tobacco use". Additionally, genoeconomic research in 2013 found that two-fifths of the "variance of educational attainment is explained by genetic factors".

Some genoeconomic researchers claim that the economic success of a country can be predicted by its genetic diversity. The American economist Enrico Spolaore says that genoeconomic work could "reduce barriers to the flows of ideas and innovations across populations".

== Criticism and limitations ==
Genoeconomic research is prone to the public misconception that genetically-influenced behaviours are separate from environmental factors. The authors of a 2012 paper said that their work "is not about a nature or nurture debate".

Nature published an online article written in 2012 about the various reactions on the subject. The field is criticized by biologists for lacking methodological rigour, drawing conclusions about causation based on causal correlation, and working with small sample sizes. The political implications of the field are also a concern for some scientists; anticipating the publication of a genoeconomics article in the journal American Economic Review, a group of scientists and social scientists wrote an open letter which said that "the suggestion that an ideal level of genetic variation could foster economic growth and could even be engineered has the potential to be misused with frightening consequences to justify indefensible practices such as ethnic cleansing or genocide".

As with other genetic-association research, the reproducibility of genoeconomic experiments is troublesome to the field. The small sample sizes used in genoeconomic research are also a problem. Commonly cited by scientists as a way to improve genoeconomic research is the use of more statistically homogeneous samples.

== Sources ==
- Beauchamp, Jonathan P; Cesarini, David; Johannesson, Magnus; van der Loos, Matthijs J. H. M; Koellinger, Philipp D; Groenen, Patrick J. F; Fowler, James H; Rosenquist, J. Niels; Thurik, A. Roy; Christakis, Nicholas A; et al. (2011). "Molecular Genetics and Economics". Journal of Economic Perspectives. 25 (4): 57–82. doi:10.1257/jep.25.4.57. PMC 3306008. PMID 22427719.
- Benjamin, Daniel J.; Cesarini, David; Chabris, Christopher F.; Glaeser, Edward L.; Laibson, David I.; Guðnason, Vilmundur; Harris, Tamara B.; et al. (2012). "The Promises and Pitfalls of Genoeconomics" (PDF). Annual Review of Economics. 4 (1): 627–662. doi:10.1146/annurev-economics-080511-110939. PMC 3592970. PMID 23482589.
- Callaway, Ewen (12 October 2012). "Economics and genetics meet in uneasy union". Nature. 490 (7419): 154–5. Bibcode:2012Natur.490..154C. doi:10.1038/490154a. eISSN 1476-4687. ISSN 0028-0836. PMID 23060165. S2CID 4313926.
- Entine, Jon (14 October 2012). "Genoeconomics: Is Our Financial Future In Our Chromosomes?". Science 2.0.
- Fletcher, Jason M. (28 August 2018). "Economics and genetics". Oxford Research Encyclopedia. Oxford University Press. doi:10.1093/acrefore/9780190625979.013.14. ISBN 9780190625979.
- Li, A; Meyre, D (2012). "Challenges in reproducibility of genetic association studies: Lessons learned from the obesity field". International Journal of Obesity. 37 (4): 559–567. doi:10.1038/ijo.2012.82. PMID 22584455.
- Navarro, Arcadi (2009). "Genoeconomics: Promises and Caveats for a New Field". Annals of the New York Academy of Sciences. 1167 (1): 57–65. Bibcode:2009NYASA1167...57N. doi:10.1111/j.1749-6632.2009.04732.x. PMID 19580553. S2CID 25894881.
- Neyfakh, Leon (13 May 2012). "In search of the money gene". The Boston Globe.
- Rietveld, Cornelius A.; et al. (2013). "GWAS of 126,559 Individuals Identifies Genetic Variants Associated with Educational Attainment" (PDF). Science. 340 (1467): 1467–1471. Bibcode:2013Sci...340.1467R. doi:10.1126/science.1235488. ISSN 1095-9203. PMC 3751588. PMID 23722424.
- Ward, Jacob (16 November 2018). "The 'Geno-Economists' Say DNA Can Predict Our Chances of Success". The New York Times Magazine.
