= Pictionary (1989 game show) =

- Created by: Robert Pittman; Brian Bedol
- Based on: Pictionary
- Presented by: Brian Robbins
- Starring: Julie Friedman (as Felicity); Rick Zumwalt (as Judge Mental)
- Announcer: Harry Stevens
- Music by: John Hodian
- Country of origin: United States
- No. of seasons: 1
- No. of episodes: 65

Production
- Production companies: Barry & Enright Productions; Quantum Media Incorporated; MCA Television

Original release
- Network: Syndication
- Release: June 5 – September 8, 1989

Pictionary is an American children's game show based on the picture-drawing board game of the same name. This was the first of three game shows based on the board game, with later editions for adults launched in 1997 and 2022. The show was hosted by Brian Robbins, with assistance from Julie Friedman as "Felicity", and Rick Zumwalt as "Judge Mental".

Pictionary ran from June 5, 1989, until September 8, 1989, in syndication and was a joint production of Barry & Enright Productions and QMI Television. The program was distributed by MCA Television.

== Gameplay ==
Two teams of three competed against each other, drawing pictures on a telestrator.

=== Round one ===
One player at a time drew a picture for his/her teammates to guess. Once the picture was guessed or 20 seconds had elapsed, the next player in line began to draw. Each team had 60 seconds to guess as many pictures as possible, and the high scorers received 10 points. If the round ended in a tie, both teams scored.

=== Round two ===
One player drew pictures for 60 seconds, attempting to get his/her teammates to guess up to seven words that were clues to a puzzle. If the team solved the puzzle once time was up, they scored 10 points; if not, the opposing team was given 30 seconds to draw more clues and could then offer a guess to steal the points. Both teams were given one turn.

=== Round three ===
Each team chose one player to draw for the entire round. These two players took turns, with a maximum of 20 seconds per picture, and the teammates of the drawing player could buzz in and respond. A correct guess scored the picture, but a miss allowed the opposing team to offer unlimited guesses for the remainder of the 20 seconds, based only on whatever had been drawn to that point. After 90 seconds, the team with more pictures scored 30 points; in the event of a tie, both teams scored.

Near the end of the run, guest stars from children's entertainment took over drawing duties during this round, and all three members of each team attempted to guess the pictures.

=== Winning ===
At the end of the three rounds, the team with the most points won the game and advanced to the Waterworks bonus round for a chance at the grand prize. If the game ended in a tie, one final picture was played and the first team to buzz in and solve it was declared the winner.

A team could score up to 60 points during the game by winning the first/third rounds and solving both puzzles in the second, and any team that did so won an additional prize.

=== Bonus Round (Waterworks) ===
The object of the bonus round was to guess a famous person depicted in a caricature drawing, which was hidden behind a tank filled with plastic balls and divided vertically into five compartments.

Each team member took on one of three roles. One member had to hold two hoses together so that water would flow from a pump into an overhead dispenser. A second member stood under the dispenser, holding a pitcher above his/her head to catch the water as it ran out through a spout in the bottom. The third member, wearing diving flippers, had to carry the filled pitcher across the stage and pour the water into the tank. As each compartment filled with water, the balls would rise and spill out to reveal portions of the caricature. The team had 90 seconds to reveal as much of the picture as possible.

Once the time had expired, the team studied the picture for 10 seconds and then made one guess at its subject, winning the day's grand prize if they were correct.

== Personnel ==
Actor Brian Robbins, who at the time was starring on the sitcom Head of the Class, was the host of this edition of Pictionary. He was assisted by Julie Friedman, who was referred to on air as “Felicity” and whose duty consisted largely of keeping score, which she did using an apparatus resembling a faucet which dispensed colored balls into a tank.

Harry Stevens, who had just finished announcing for the syndicated version of the Nickelodeon game show Finders Keepers, filled the same role on Pictionary while arm wrestler Rick Zumwalt served as the game's rules enforcer and judge as the character of “Judge Mental”.

== International versions ==
Country	Name	Host	Network	Date premiered
Spain	Pictionary	Jordi Hurtado	TVE 1	1991
