= Charlie O'Donnell =

American journalist and television announcer (1932–2010)

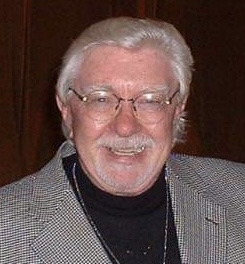
- O'Donnell in 2003
- Born: Charles John O'Donnell; August 12, 1932; Philadelphia, Pennsylvania, U.S.
- Died: November 1, 2010 (aged 78); Sherman Oaks, Los Angeles, California, U.S.
- Occupations: Radio and television announcer
- Years active: 1956–2010
- Known for: Announcer on Wheel of Fortune (1975–1980, 1989–2010)
- Spouses: Jane Ryan (m. 1952; died 1984) 1 Ellen Lerner (m. 1990)
- Children: 4

Charles John O'Donnell (August 12, 1932 – November 1, 2010) was an American radio and television announcer, primarily known for his work on game shows, and his distinctive baritone voice. Among them, he was best known for Wheel of Fortune, where he worked from 1975 to 1980, and again from 1989 until his death. O'Donnell was also known for announcing American Bandstand.

== Early career ==
O'Donnell, a Philadelphia native, began his career as a teenager at WCHA in Chambersburg, Pennsylvania. In 1956, he worked as program director at WHAT, a 250-watt R&B station in Philadelphia, where he discovered and launched the career of future Philadelphia radio personality Hy Lit. When WIBG became top-40 in 1957, O'Donnell was named news director. In 1958, he became the sidekick of Dick Clark on WFIL-TV's afternoon dance program, American Bandstand.

This led to several stints as a disc jockey on Los Angeles radio (most notably on Pasadena station KRLA, 1964–67), and later as news anchorman and staff announcer on Los Angeles television station KCOP-TV, where he performed double duty and often introduced his own newscasts with the self-referential cue "and now Charlie O'Donnell with the news." Additionally, Barry & Enright Productions taped The Joker's Wild and Tic-Tac-Dough at KCOP during its initial syndicated runs, which O'Donnell announced for. It was also in this period that he voiced the newscaster on the Simon & Garfunkel recording "7 O'Clock News/Silent Night."

He made a full-time career as an announcer on many television shows throughout the decades, with such series as The Joker's Wild, Tic-Tac-Dough, Bullseye and The $100,000 Pyramid (again working with Dick Clark). He also served as announcer for the American Music Awards, the Emmy Awards, and the Academy Awards.

== Wheel of Fortune and other game shows ==
O'Donnell was perhaps best known as the announcer of the game show Wheel of Fortune. He filled this role from 1975 to 1980 (including two unaired pilots hosted by 77 Sunset Strip actor Edd Byrnes), acted as a substitute for his successor, Jack Clark, and returned to the show permanently several months after Clark's death in 1988. Between Clark's death and O'Donnell's return, disc jockey M.G. Kelly announced the show for most of its 1988-89 season. O'Donnell also contributed to the 2010 video game based on Wheel of Fortune, which was released just a day after his death.

Among the game show companies O'Donnell worked for as a primary announcer were Merv Griffin Enterprises/Sony Pictures Television (1975–87 and 1989–2010), Barry & Enright Productions (1981–86), and Barris Industries/The Guber-Peters Entertainment Company (1986–89) He also announced game shows for Mark Goodson-Bill Todman Productions (including Card Sharks, Trivia Trap, To Tell the Truth), Bob Stewart Productions (The $100,000 Pyramid), Hill-Eubanks Group's All Star Secrets and The Guinness Game, and Scotti Bros.-Syd Vinnedge's Wordplay.

He and John Harlan filled in for Rod Roddy on different occasions on Press Your Luck. He also announced on the game show version of Monopoly, and re-voiced the credits tags for episodes of Jeopardy!, Wheel, and Headline Chasers (and several other library game shows acquired by Sony) airing on Game Show Network produced before 1994, when Columbia TriStar Television became the new name of what is now Sony Pictures Television, and its new closing credits card replaced those of Coca-Cola Television, Columbia Pictures Television, and King World Productions (now CBS Media Ventures). He also performed voice acting and host duties off-screen on most of the Wheel of Fortune video games which came out after 1992, either along with Vanna White, or entirely by himself, as Pat Sajak would not participate in any of the video games until his children were grown.

In addition to announcing on The All-New Dating Game, he appeared as a bachelor during the show's 1987-88 season.

O’Donnell’s other, non-game show work includes, in addition to his duties on American Bandstand, the music variety series Dance Fever, talk shows The Toni Tennille Show and America, and weekly music countdown series Solid Gold.

== Death ==
O'Donnell died in his sleep at his Sherman Oaks, California, home on November 1, 2010 of congestive heart failure at the age of 78. He was survived by his second wife, Ellen Lerner, 4 children and two grandchildren. O'Donnell's funeral was held on November 11, 2010, at St. Charles Catholic Church in North Hollywood. O'Donnell's body was also cremated, with his ashes given to his family.

After his death, the show began rotating announcing duties among several guests, including Jeopardy! announcer Johnny Gilbert and former Price Is Right announcer Rich Fields who voiced some 55 episodes. Wheel of Fortune host Pat Sajak described O'Donnell as "the perfect voice of the show." O'Donnell's last announced episode aired on October 29, 2010, three days before his death. O'Donnell was succeeded by veteran L.A. radio announcer Jim Thornton, who remained with the show until his dismissal shortly before the 2026–27 season. He can still be heard on Wheel of Fortune slot machines.

The Broadcast Pioneers of Philadelphia posthumously inducted O'Donnell into their Hall of Fame in 2011.
