= Jack Barry (game show host) =

20th-century American television personality

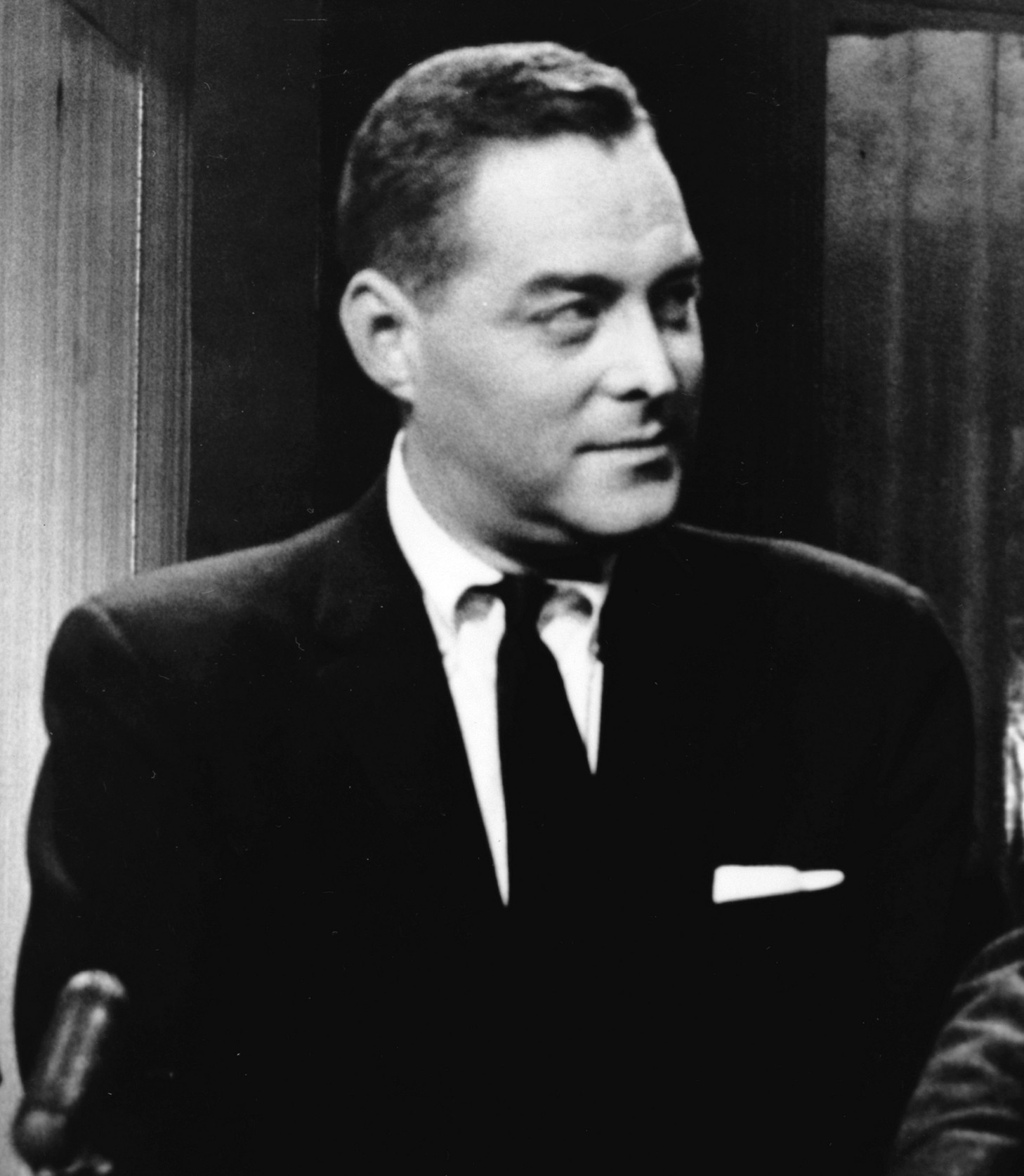
- Barry hosting Twenty-One, 1957
- Born: Jack Barasch; March 20, 1918; Lindenhurst, New York, U.S.
- Died: May 2, 1984 (aged 66); Manhattan, New York City, U.S.
- Education: University of Pennsylvania (BS)
- Years active: 1942–1984
- Spouses: Marcia Van Dyke (m. 1952; div. 1958); Patte Preble (m. 1960)
- Children: 4 (2 with each spouse)

Jack Barry (born Jack Barasch; March 20, 1918 – May 2, 1984) was an American game show host, television personality and executive who made a name for himself in the game show field. Barry served as host of several game shows in his career, many of which he developed along with Dan Enright as part of their joint operation Barry & Enright Productions.

Barry's reputation became tarnished due to his involvement in the 1950s quiz show scandals and the ensuing fallout affected his career for over a decade.

== Early life and career ==
Barry was born and raised in Lindenhurst, New York, on Long Island. His family was Jewish. He graduated from Lindenhurst Senior High School and the University of Pennsylvania's Wharton School, in Philadelphia. In the 1940s, he began hosting programs on radio, including AM 710 WOR. Through his radio work, he met his eventual business partner Dan Enright.

== Quiz show scandal ==
In 1956, Barry and Enright launched Tic-Tac-Dough and Twenty-One, the latter sponsored by Geritol. Both quiz shows were hosted by Barry. In a 1992 PBS documentary, Barry's partner, Dan Enright, said that after the first unrigged broadcast of Twenty-One, sponsor Geritol complained to Barry and Enright the following day about the dullness of that episode (the two contestants repeatedly missed questions). According to Enright, "from that moment on, we decided to rig Twenty-One." The show was then meticulously choreographed, right down to how contestants comported themselves on the air, making them complicit in the deception.

In 1958, a match between challenger Charles Van Doren and champion Herb Stempel was found to have been rigged, with Van Doren's victory having been pre-determined by the producers. (The 1994 movie Quiz Show was based on the Stempel-Van Doren contests.) Within three months of the published revelation, Twenty-One was cancelled. Dough Re Mi and three other shows were taken over by NBC. Another Barry-Enright production, Tic Tac Dough, was cancelled as well. Barry next hosted the nighttime version of a new show Barry and Enright created with Robert Noah and Buddy Piper, Concentration. With the quiz show scandal heating up, Barry left Concentration after four weeks. Barry and Enright were forced to sell all rights of their shows to NBC.

Though Enright and producer Albert Freedman actually carried out the rigging of Twenty-One, Barry admitted in the 1970s and 1980s his role in covering up for the partners.

== After the scandal ==
In the fall of 1961, Barry moved to Hollywood, Florida, where he and Dan Enright still owned a small AM radio station, WGMA (now WLQY), which they had purchased in 1957; Barry ran the station for nine months and used it as a base of operations for a new production company to create game shows. He developed a game show called Hole in One, which he hosted for station WLBW-TV (now WPLG) in Miami in the spring of 1962. The show combined a word game with golf and offered a prize of $5,000 to anyone able to sink nine holes-in-one in a row. The show was cancelled after thirteen weeks.

=== Move to Los Angeles ===
Barry also hosted the game shows By the Numbers, Addograms, and Pick 'n' Choose, as well as a two-hour talk show titled L.A. Today. In 1963, while being employed by KTLA, he was optioned by CBS for a game show Where Are You From?, but it was never materialized due to the failure of ABC's 100 Grand. In 1964, KTLA-TV was purchased from Paramount by an investment group headed by Gene Autry, which later controlled the California Angels (now the Los Angeles Angels) baseball team and Channel 5. Autry overhauled the station's schedule and dropped most of the game and variety shows, and Barry lost his job with the station in August 1964. Barry spent the next two years working primarily as a game show consultant to other producers. Barry even dabbled in acting, playing a newsman on the premiere of the mid-1960s TV series Batman. He also assisted with directing several episodes of Batman in 1966. He also did a guest reporter spot on the TV series The Addams Family.

== Working in Canada ==
In 1966, Barry accepted an offer from Dan Enright, who was working for Screen Gems in Canada, to collaborate on small Canadian-produced quiz shows. Barry hosted Photo Finish, shot in Montreal, and It's a Match and The Little People, taped in Toronto. It was on these shows that a number of young American and Canadian producers and directors got their start, including Mark Phillips and Sidney M. Cohen. Rather than move to Canada, Barry commuted from his home in Los Angeles working for 10 days at a time taping several episodes of his shows. By 1968, the commute was wearing on Barry and his wife, Patte, threatened to walk out on him with their two small children if he did not find work closer to home. With the family's finances in dire straits, Barry briefly moved his family to Southern Spain to find an inexpensive place to live. It was here that Barry's savings finally ran out.

== Comeback ==
Barry borrowed $40,000 from his father-in-law and put a down payment on a Los Angeles-area radio station (KKOP 93.5 FM, Redondo Beach, later renamed KFOX, now KDAY). In later interviews, he stated that he bought the station specifically because it would require him to have a license from the FCC, and that if the FCC would be willing to grant him a license, it would decisively demonstrate that his reputation was no longer "tainted" by the game show scandals. "Slowly," said a 1984 article in TV Guide that discussed game show hosts, "he began to receive calls: Would he fill in for five weeks on this game show? Yes. Of course."

In December 1968, Barry embarked on an idea that would launch his national comeback, and eventually become the most successful game show project of his career. He developed and produced two pilots for The Joker's Wild emceed by Allen Ludden. CBS held off on picking up the series at first. Finally, in 1969 Barry became a host again, for ABC's The Generation Gap, replacing original host Dennis Wholey for the final weeks of its series. In mid-1969, Barry entered into a limited association with Goodson-Todman Productions to collaborate on new game show creations, but the partnership was short-lived.

Barry even brought Dan Enright back as The Joker's Wild's executive producer toward the end of its first network run, mentioning Enright at the end of the final CBS installment. The two renewed their working partnership full-time in 1976, launching Break the Bank, hosted by Tom Kennedy, on ABC's daytime lineup. When ABC cancelled the show despite decent ratings, Barry himself hosted and produced the show for weekly syndication during the 1976–77 season.

Barry also started a specialty TV company named Jack Barry Cable, which served customers in the Los Angeles area.

== Death ==
On Wednesday, May 2, 1984, Barry collapsed in New York's Central Park after suffering a massive heart attack during a morning jog, near 64th Street and Fifth Avenue. He was rushed to Lenox Hill Hospital where he was pronounced dead at 1:20 p.m.

At the time of his death, Barry and his wife had just returned from visiting their daughter in Spain. He had planned to retire as host of The Joker's Wild by the end of the summer.

Barry was buried at Forest Lawn Memorial Park in Glendale, California.

== Aftermath ==
Following Barry's sudden death, his partner Dan Enright continued to run Barry & Enright Productions completely, retaining the B&E name, as opposed to renaming the company "Dan Enright Productions." Barry's death resulted in the departure of key Barry & Enright figures, including producers Ron Greenberg and Gary Cox and director Richard S. Kline, all three of whom were not in favor of Enright taking over the company. Barry's sons joined Kline and other Barry loyalists in a walkout, forming a new company, Kline & Friends.

== In popular culture ==
Barry was portrayed by Christopher McDonald in the 1994 film Quiz Show.
