= Playgirl =

American women's magazine

- June 1973 cover (issue 1, number 1)
- Categories: Women's magazines
- Frequency: Monthly (1973–2009); Quarterly (2010–2016)
- Publisher: Douglas Lambert (1973–1976); Ira Ritter (1977–1986); Drake Publishers, Inc. (1986–1993); Crescent Publishing Group, Inc. (1993–2001); Blue Horizon Media, Inc. (2001–2011); Magna Publishing Group, Inc. (2011–2016)
- Founded: 1973
- First issue: June 1973
- Final issue: Winter 2016
- Company: Magna Publishing Group
- Country: United States
- Based in: Paramus, New Jersey
- Website: playgirl.com
- ISSN: 0273-6918

Playgirl is an American magazine that historically featured pictorials of nude and semi-nude men alongside general interest, lifestyle, celebrity journalism, and original fiction. For most of its history, the magazine printed monthly and was marketed mainly to women, though it developed a significant gay male readership.

Since its founding, Playgirl has existed as a monthly and quarterly publication, in print-only, digital-only, and hybrid formats. From 1973–2009, the magazine was issued in a monthly print format, before transitioning to a quarterly print publication in 2009. Regular print operations were paused from 2016–2020, with only an online presence maintained. In November 2020, the magazine relaunched with a 10,000-print run in the United States and United Kingdom, before selling out and returning to press for a second printing. After that relaunch, the magazine resumed monthly releases as an online, digital publication.

== History ==
Playgirl magazine was founded in 1973 by Los Angeles-based nightclub owner Douglas Lambert, who'd initially explored creating a men's lifestyle magazine featuring nude women to compete with Hugh Hefner's Playboy. At the suggestion of his wife, and inspired by the success of Helen Gurley Brown's use of male nudes in Cosmopolitan magazine (including a shoot featuring film star Burt Reynolds), Lambert refashioned his idea as a feminist response to Playboy and Penthouse instead. In partnership with William Miles Jr., an area advertising executive, Lambert founded Playgirl in Century City, California, in 1973 with a $20,000 investment.

=== The Lambert years ===
After two test issues (featuring race car driver Mike Hiss and the Hager Twins, country singers and stars of TV's Hee Haw, in seminude centerfolds), the magazine, initially styled as Playgirl: The Magazine for Women formally debuted in June 1973, featuring television and film star Lyle Waggoner as centerfold and an interview and nude photoshoot with actor Ryan McDonald. Editorial in the issue included a travel pictorial on Hong Kong, long-form interview with actress Cloris Leachman, original fiction by Jillian Charles, and a guide to selecting artwork for the home. The first issue sold out quickly, selling 600,000 copies in four days, and for the rest of the 1970s, the magazine would sell, on average, 1.5 million copies each month.

From its inception, Playgirl has featured full frontal nude and semi-nude (rear and obscured frontal) pictorials of men, except for a 10-month period in 1986 and 1987, when following the sale and reorganization of the magazine, new ownership mandated a new approach in the hopes of appealing to a wider readership in an increasingly politically and culturally conservative time. Editorially, the magazine covered hot-button sociopolitical issues like abortion and equal rights for the majority of its print run. In the magazine's first decade, it typically did so via long-form journalism, commentary, and feature interviews from well-regarded staff and freelance writers. Through the mid-1980s, in-depth interviews with A-list celebrities and newsmakers, including Maya Angelou, Larry Flynt, Barbra Streisand, and Jane Fonda, were frequently paired with commentary from cultural essayists such as Angelou, and original fiction from both emergent and established writers, including Erica Jong and Truman Capote.

=== The Ritter years ===
In 1977, Lambert sold Playgirl to Ira Ritter who took over as publisher, continuing the magazine's editorial style and direction (including male nude pictorials) but leaning more publicly into the magazine's feminist and journalistic bona fides. Covers in Ritter's first years centered women, often alone, to highlight female perspectives on politics and other cultural issues, deemphasizing the nude photography and erotic themes still central to the magazine, in terms of magazine's public-facing image and newsstand presence. Results were mixed and in 1986, with readership declines compounded by bad investments by the owners (including the launch of an unsuccessful spin-off publication, Playgirl Advisor, with a more direct focus on sex, sexuality, and couples), Playgirl filed for Chapter 11 bankruptcy protection and was subsequently acquired by Drake Publishers, Inc.

=== Drake Publishers, Inc. ===
Until the 1986 change of ownership, Playgirl's interviews, journalism, and original fiction were central to the magazine's identity and featured and promoted as such. After Drake's acquisition of the title, the restructured magazine began featuring simplified beefcake-style covers (usually highlighting a model from the issue in underwear or speedo-style swimwear), and implemented changes to cut costs and expand readership in an increasingly conservative and less feminist-friendly cultural environment of the late Reagan era. This resulted in substantial reductions in the in-depth, substantive journalism, political and social feminist commentary the magazine was known for, a decrease in non-pictorial pages, and an increase in advertising space.

Ultimately, the 1986-87 reorganization of the magazine failed to significantly increase general readership or improve the magazine's cultural palatability in the new environment, but did have the effect of eroding the magazine's credibility as a substantive mainstream publication that blended erotic content with substantive journalism, repositioned as a niche, adult-oriented publication.

=== Crescent Publishing Group and Blue Horizon Media ===
The 1993 acquisition of Drake by Crescent Publishing Group, the owner of hardcore magazine like High Society and other pornographic titles, cemented Playgirl's reputation as an adult title and, as a result, the number of celebrities and newsmakers sitting for interviews or pictorials rapidly decreased.

Crescent's experiments in the 1990s with the publication of celebrity nudes acquired from external sources—including art nudes alleged to be actor Antonio Banderas and intrusive paparazzi photos of actor Brad Pitt (both presented as cover stories), proved short-lived after a series of expensive legal losses and settlements with Banderas, Pitt, and others. Actor Leonardo DiCaprio successfully sued to stop publication of photographs taken without his knowledge, and the pressure from Crescent to publish the photos led to the resignation of Editor-in-Chief, Ceslie Armstrong, who called the photographs "an invasion of privacy [that] I can't be associated with."

By the 2000s, Crescent had fully repositioned the title as an adult brand, relaunching Playgirl's website as a pay site primarily featuring co-branded hardcore straight pornography, and increasing explicit content in the print magazine. In August 2000, Crescent was charged by the Federal Trade Commission with over $180 million of online credit card fraud, some of which was alleged by the FTC to have taken place on their new Playgirl website. In November 2001, Crescent agreed to pay $30 million in refunds and subsequently changed its name to Blue Horizon Media, Inc.

In August 2008, the magazine announced that it would cease publication of its print edition as of the January 2009 issue. The last print issue of the magazine's initial print run was published as a January/February issue and sold on newsstands through March 2009. Playgirl was then published online through February 2010, when print publication resumed with a March issue featuring political celebrity Levi Johnston, shot by longtime Playgirl photographer Greg Weiner.

=== Blue Horizon ===
In 2011, Blue Horizon sold the print rights for Playgirl and other titles to Magna Publishing Group, Inc. of Paramus, New Jersey, and the magazine continued to publish as a print title, approximately quarterly, until 2016, when with print subscriptions dwindling to approximately 3,000 the title ceased regular print operations.

=== 2020 relaunch and current era ===
In 2020, new owner Jack Lindley Kuhns, a gay man, revived the title, relaunching the "New Playgirl Magazine" with a special print edition, featuring a pregnant and nude actress Chloe Sevigny on the cover (a nod to both Playgirl's feminist roots and the magazine's early issues, which often featured women on the cover), edited by Skye Parrott. The issue, described by Kuhns as "part political magazine and part art magazine" featured images of nude bodies of all ethnicities and genders, as well as writing about racial injustice, trans empowerment, and body positivity and sold out immediately.

Since the 2020 relaunch, the magazine has moved to a regular publishing cycle as an online-only title split across two domains: Playgirl.com, a free site featuring a mix of news, features, and photo essays, and PlaygirlPlus.com, a subscription site where access to the publication's archives and the magazine's traditional "Man of the Month" nude photospread, modernized with additional video and multimedia content, are hosted. Nicole Caldwell, a former editor-in-chief during the magazine's print run, oversees the online iteration in the same capacity. Under the direction Caldwell, Boardman, and production director Daniel McKernan, the brand has refocused on the traditional male physique and art nude composition the magazine is historically known for, incorporating additional video and multi-media content, moving away from the more explicit depictions of the print magazine's final years and reembracing the magazine's roots. Both domains highlight the decades of substantive journalism, commentary, fiction, and pictorials from the magazine's archives, presenting them in newly digitized formats.

== Celebrities and public figures nude in Playgirl ==
Many celebrities and public figures have posed nude or semi-nude for Playgirl during the magazine's initial print and digital incarnations, with "posed" defined as appearing as a model for a shoot for the magazine specifically (versus merely appearing clothed and/or shirtless in the magazine or nude in photos acquired from external sources).

Playgirl featured the highest number of A-list celebrities in nude photoshoots in the 1970s, in the wake of the American sexual revolution and early feminist positioning of the magazine, and 1980s. While many celebrities, such as football legend and actor Jim Brown, World Series MVP Steve Yeager, and actors Lyle Waggoner and Christopher Atkins, posed nude at the height (or near height) of their fame, some, including actors Sam J. Jones and Steve Bond, and country singer Keith Urban, posed earlier in their careers, going on to greater professional success in the years immediately following. Others, like teen idol singer and actor Fabian, Skid Row musician Phil Varone, and supermodel Tim Boyce posed nude for the magazine after the height of their fame, introducing themselves to new generational audiences. On rare occasions, as with fallen 9/11 firefighter Vincent Princiotta, Playgirl models came to national prominence posthumously.

With dozens of celebrities and public figures posing for the magazine over the five-decade print runs, circumstances and experiences varied. Many of the early celebrity centerfolds elected to pose in support of the feminist and gender equality aims of the magazine, particularly in response to male-oriented titles like Playboy, which already featured nude female celebrities. NFL player Dan Pastorini first posed for the magazine to help pay off a legal settlement, but positive reception to his shoot led to a second appearance shortly after. While film star Atkins told UPI columnist Vernon Scott he'd posed to "stir up some controversy" in his young career, Olympian Greg Louganis disclosed in his autobiography that he hadn't wanted to do his shoot, but felt pressured to do as a marketing vehicle (to bolster the heterosexual "heartthrob" appeal of the then-closeted diver). Singer Johnny Mathis, unhappy with the results of his shoot, requested his feature not run (the magazine agreed), while NFL player Bob Chandler, who posed shortly after his team won the Super Bowl, was pleased with his layout, and displayed a framed shot in his home.

Actor Marcus Patrick claimed then-editors' use of photos more explicit than agreed cost him his role on the daytime soap opera Days of Our Lives, and singer Urban jokingly called posing pre-superstardom a "career regret", finding the photos, which featured him posing nude and in underwear with his guitar, embarrassing. Conversely, musician Peter Steele expressed strong regret for his unusually explicit shoot, reportedly repulsed by the attention he garnered from gay fans. Others, like straight soap opera actor John Gibson, found the attention from male and female fans equally flattering, with Gibson specifically crediting the positive attention from his Playgirl appearance for his career shift and subsequent success as an actor, model, and dancer.

While celebrities and public figures from many walks of life—including the military, circus arts, and politics—have posed nude for Playgirl, the majority of the magazine's high-profile nude models have come from the worlds of film and television acting, professional and world-class athletics (mostly professional baseball, football, and Olympic athletes), and music, including well-known pop, rock, metal, and rap artists. Historically, famous athletes and musicians have posed fully, frontally nude at the highest rates, while actors, generally required to more carefully manage public image and perception, have been more likely to pose for obscured or rear-only nude pictorials (with some notable exceptions).

The number of mainstream celebrities appearing nude in the magazine slowed steadily following a 1986 restructuring (which saw significant cuts to the budget for original features and an end to the high fees previously paid out to celebrity models), and as a result of increasing cultural conservatism at the end of the Reagan Administration and concurrent rise of cultural movements like the Moral Majority, which called for the censorship and restriction of nudity as non-"family friendly" content in American media. With top publicists and representatives for A-list actors and professional athletes more wary of associating with the magazine, celebrity appearances (including A-list interviews) grew rarer. This trend hastened in the final years of the magazine's print run, when the magazine's owners moved the publication in a more explicit direction. (As a general rule, explicit celebrity photoshoots, featuring erections or sexually suggestive poses with a female model, were exceptionally rare; most exceptions—including Steele, Varone and reality stars Nick Hawk and Joey Kovar—came during this later period in the title's history.) In the final years of the print run, celebrity appearances were limited exclusively to personalities from the world of reality television.

In February 2024, the newly relaunched, and no longer explicit, Playgirl announced the first celebrity pictorial of its new era—featuring actors Bryan Dattilo, Emmy Award-nominee Paul Telfer, Robert Scott Wilson, and Emmy Award-winner Eric Martsolf, stars of the long-running soap opera Days of Our Lives, along with their former co-star, Hawai'i 5-0 and Star Wars: Resistance actor Christopher Sean would be released in April. Actor Christopher Atkins once again graced the cover of the July 2025 issue. A new Greg Gorman photoshoot with Atkins was conducted for the issue.

Celebrities and notable public figures who posed for Playgirl pictorials
Year	Issue	Type	Style	Name	Field/Notability
1973	January (preview issue)	centerfold	obscured full nude	Mike Hiss	professional race car driver
1973	February/March (preview issue)	centerfold	obscured full nude	The Hager Twins	singers, variety show stars (Hee Haw), actors (The Bionic Woman, Twin Detectives)
1973	June	centerfold	obscured full nude	Lyle Waggoner	actor (The Carol Burnett Show, Wonder Woman)
1973	June	celebrity nude	obscured full nude	Ryan McDonald	actor (The Odd Couple, Days of Our Lives)
1973	July	centerfold	frontal nude	George Maharis	Emmy Award-nominated actor (Route 66, The Most Deadly Game), singer
1973	August	centerfold	obscured full nude	Gary Conway	actor (Burke's Law, Land of the Giants) and screenwriter
1973	August	feature	rear, obscured nude	Alan Landers	actor, model (The Winston Man)
1973	September	centerfold	obscured full nude	Fabian Forte	singer, actor (The Longest Day), Emmy Award-nominated producer
1973	October	centerfold	obscured full nude	Fred Williamson	professional football player, actor (Black Caesar, Julia)
1973	November	centerfold	frontal nude	Don Stroud	actor (The Amityville Horror, Mrs. Colombo), stuntman
1973	June	centerfold	obscured full nude	Cristopher George	actor (Grizzly)
1973	December	centerfold	frontal nude	Jean-Paul Vignon	French singer, TV host, actor (The French Atlantic Affair, The Rockford Files)
1974	January	celebrity nude	rear, obscured full nude	John Ericson	actor (Honey West, Stalag 17 original Broadway cast)
1974	January	feature	frontal nude	Sonny Landham	actor (48 Hours, Predator), politician
1974	April	centerfold	frontal nude	Peter Lupus	actor (Mission: Impossible), champion bodybuilder
1974	June	group feature	frontal nude	San Diego State Rugby Team	athletic team
1974	June	feature	frontal nude	Angie Reno	world champion professional surfer
1974	July	feature	frontal nude	Lou Zivkovich	professional football player
1974	August	centerfold	frontal nude	Greg Rogers, Ron Rogers	Australian swimmers, Olympians, Olympic medalist (Gregg)
1974	September	centerfold	frontal nude	Jim Brown	professional football player (Pro Football Hall of Fame), actor (The Dirty Dozen, 100 Rifles), Emmy Award-nominated broadcaster
1974	September	feature	frontal nude	Mike Purpus	champion professional surfer
1974	November	centerfold	frontal nude	Phil Avalon	Australian actor and producer
1975	April	centerfold	frontal nude	John Gibson	actor (The Young and the Restless, The Warriors) and dancer
1975	June	centerfold	frontal nude	Sam J. Jones	actor (Flash Gordon, The Highwayman) and professional football player
1975	September		frontal nude	Jaime Moreno Galvez	Mexican telenovela actor, singer
1975	October	feature	frontal nude	Steve Bond	actor (General Hospital, Picasso Trigger)
1976	January	centerfold	frontal nude	Jimmy Cavaretta	celebrity trapeze artist, television personality
1977	February	centerfold	frontal nude	Dick Baney	professional baseball player
1980	November	group feature	frontal nude	Eric Martin and Kid Courage	musician, rock band
1980	December	centerfold	rear, obscured full nude	Dan Pastorini #1	professional football player
1981	July	feature	obscured full nude	Dan Ford	professional baseball player
1981	December	feature	rear, obscured full nude	Bob Chandler	professional football player (Rose Bowl MVP, Super Bowl XV winner)
1982	January	return feature	rear, obscured full nude	Dan Pastorini #2	professional football player (Super Bowl XV winner)
1982	July	feature	rear, obscured full nude	Leon Isaac Kennedy	actor (Body and Soul, Lone Wolf McQuade), disc jockey, playwright
1982	September	feature	frontal nude	Christopher Atkins	actor (The Blue Lagoon, Dallas)
1982	October	feature	rear, obscured full nude	Steve Yeager	professional baseball player (World Series MVP)
1982	December	feature	rear, obscured full nude	John Matuszak	professional football player and actor (The Goonies)
1983	January	feature	rear, obscured full nude	Tommy Chong	actor (Cheech & Chong, That 70s Show), Grammy Award-winning comedian
1983	January	feature	frontal nude	Don Williams	professional football player
1983	April	feature	obscured full nude, underwear	Bubba Smith	professional football player
1983	June	feature	rear, obscured full nude	Warren Cuccurullo #1	musician (Duran Duran, Missing Persons)
1983	July	feature	rear, obscured full nude	Steve Stone	professional baseball player (Cy Young Award), Emmy Award-winning broadcaster
1984	January	feature	obscured full nude	Glenn Morrissey	actor (Emerald Point N.A.S., Force: Five)
1985	October	feature	rear, obscured full nude	Héctor Camacho #1	Puerto Rican boxing champion
	December	feature	obscured full nude, underwear	Eric Dickerson	professional football player
1986	March	feature	rear, obscured full nude	Brian Pockar	Canadian Olympic figure skater, national champion
1986	August	cover story	rear nude	David Lee Roth	singer (Van Halen)
1986	August	feature	frontal nude	Steven Pearcy	singer and musician (Ratt)
1987	August	feature	rear, obscured full nude	Greg Louganis	diver, Olympic medalist
1987	April	feature	rear nudity	Jeff O'Haco	actor (Return to Lonesome Dove, Dr. Quinn, Medicine Woman), stuntman
1989	April	cover story	underwear	Frank Dicopoulous	actor (Guiding Light, Forever and a Day)
1991	May	cover story	obscured full nude, underwear	Kip Winger	Grammy Award-nominated musician (Winger)
1991	June	feature	rear, obscured full nude	Big Daddy Kane	Grammy Award-winning rapper, producer
1994	January	feature	frontal nude	Frank Sepe #1	fitness celebrity, author, model
1994	September	cover story	obscured full nude, underwear	Chayanne	Grammy Award-nominated Puerto Rican singer and actor
1994	November	group feature	frontal nude	Vincent Princiotta	NYC firefighter (fallen 9/11 first responder)
1995	October	feature	frontal nude	Hermann Eastmond	Pan-American Games medalist, national team athlete
1995	August	cover story	frontal nude (explicit)	Peter Steele	musician (Type O Negative)
1996	August	feature	frontal nude	Father MC	rapper, Grammy Award-nominated producer
1996	October	cover story	obscured full nude	Shawn Michaels	professional wrestler (world champion)
1998	January	feature	frontal nude	Frank Sepe #2	professional bodybuilder, author, model
1998	May	feature	frontal nude	Robert John Burk	celebrity street performer (The Naked Cowboy), model
1998	Digital	PG Extras	frontal nude (explicit)	Warren Cuccurullo #2	musician (Duran Duran, Missing Persons)
2000	October	cover story	obscured full nude	Christian Boeving	actor (Kingdom of Heaven, When Eagles Strike), extreme athlete (Battle Dome)
2000	January	cover story	rear, obscured full nude	Victor Webster	actor (Days of Our Lives, The Matchmaker Mysteries)
2000	May	cover story	rear, obscured full nude	Winsor Harmon	actor (All My Children, The Bold and the Beautiful)
2002	September	cover story	underwear	James Hyde	actor (Passions, Monarca)
2001	April	cover story	obscured full nude	Keith Urban	Grammy Award-winning singer
2003	May	feature	rear, obscured full nude	Darryl Worley	CMA-nominated singer
2006	April	feature	obscured full nude	Brendon Small	actor, comedian, musician (Metalocalypse)
2006	June	feature	frontal nude	Danny Lopes	actor (Desecration, Satan's Playground)
2007	April	feature	rear, obscured full nude	Vito LoGrasso	professional wrestler
2007	September	cover story	frontal nude	Marcus Patrick	actor (Days of Our Lives, All My Children)
2010	Winter #1	feature	rear, obscured full nude	Levi Johnston	political celebrity
2010	Summer	cover story	frontal nude	Ronnie Kroell	actor, politician, reality TV star (Make Me a Super Model)
2010	Summer	return feature	frontal nude	Héctor Camacho #2	Puerto Rican boxing champion
2010	Winter #2	cover story	frontal nude (explicit)	Phil Varone	musician (Skid Row)
2011	Spring	cover story	frontal nude	Tim Boyce	supermodel
2011	Fall	cover story	frontal nude	Joey Kovar	reality TV star (The Real World), bodybuilder
2013	Spring	cover story	rear, obscured full nude	Filippo Giove	reality TV star (Jerseylicious)
2013	Summer	cover story	frontal nude (explicit)	Nick Hawk	model, reality TV star (Gigolos)
2013	October	digital feature	rear, obscured full nude	Mike Shouhed	reality TV star (Shahs of Sunset)
2024	March	digital feature	underwear	Maluma	Grammy Award-winning singer
2024	April	digital feature, video	underwear (all), obscured full nude (Telfer, video only)	Bryan Dattilo, Eric Martsolf, Paul Telfer, Robert Scott Wilson, Christopher Sean	actors (Days of Our Lives - all, Hawaii Five-0, Star Wars: Resistance - Sean, Emmy Award-winner - Marsolf)
2024	August	digital feature	underwear	Lucky Daye	Grammy Award-nominated singer and songwriter
2024	December	digital feature, video	rear, obscured full nude (video only)	Gleb Savchenko	professional dancer (Dancing with the Stars)
2025	January	digital, feature	underwear, rear nude	NLE Choppa	rapper
2025	July	digital feature, cover story	—N/a	Christopher Atkins	actor

== Readership and gay following ==
Though the magazine was mainly marketed to heterosexual women, it developed a substantial gay male following. In 2003, then-editor-in-chief Michele Zipp acknowledged the magazine's gay readership, noting "it's 'Entertainment for Women' because there's no other magazine out there that caters to women in the way we do [but]...we love our gay readers as well, and the gay readership [of the magazine] is about 30%."

Dirk Shafer, one of the gay men featured, later produced a comic mockumentary titled Man of the Year in which he discussed balancing his own homosexuality with his role as Playgirl's "Man of the Year", a seemingly heterosexual sex symbol. While the magazine always presented its models as heterosexual, openly gay models have appeared in the magazine, including Scott Merritt, Playgirl's 30th-anniversary centerfold, who came out publicly in an interview with The Advocate. Some models featured over the magazine's print run also posed for gay-focused publications or worked in the gay adult entertainment industry.

== Playgirl in popular culture ==
- In the 1976 episode "Archies Operation (Part I) of the classic American sitcom All in the Family, lead character Edith Bunker reads Playgirl magazine while her husband Archie stresses over an upcoming surgical procedure.
- At the start of the 1980 horror film The Shining, Jack Torrance, played by Jack Nicholson, reads the January 1978 issue of Playgirl while waiting for the tour of the Overlook Hotel to begin.
- The third episode of MTV's Jackass season six (airing in 2002) is entitled "Playgirl Pontius" and features cast member Chris Pontius shooting nude photographs for Playgirl magazine.
- Cal Naughton Jr, a fictional race car driver played by John C. Reilly in the 2006 film Talladega Nights: The Ballad of Ricky Bobby, reveals he'd previously posed as Mike Honcho for Playgirl
- A 2010 "April Fools" episode on Smosh, an American comedy YouTube channel, entitled "Anthony Poses for Playgirl?!" pranked viewers with a fake announcement that one of the channel's co-hosts had posed for the magazine
- In the 2019 episode of the sitcom Modern Family, the discovery of Mitchell Pritchett's old Playgirl magazine makes his husband, Cameron Tucker, comically jealous.
- During the 2011 season of reality series A List: New York, cast member Austin Armacost shoots test photos and considers posing for Playgirl
- The protagonist of the 2017 film Lady Bird, portrayed by Saoirse Ronan, celebrates turning 18 years old by purchasing a Playgirl magazine.
- The 2022–2023 television dramedy Minx, followed the creation and running of a Playgirl-like magazine in the mid-1970s (the same time period the real-life magazine was founded)

== Other versions ==
Playgirl is available in English and has been published in a number of other languages and international English-language editions during its history:

- Germany (1978–1980 and 1989–2003)
- France (1978)
- Australia (1985–88) and as Interlude in 1991
- Netherlands (1987–88)
- United Kingdom (1992–93, 2011)
- Spain (1992–93)
- South Africa (1995)
- Brazil (1985)
- Russia (2004–09)
- Japan (1986–2015)

When the Russian version of Playgirl was launched in June 2004, it contained photographs of nude, circumcised American men despite circumcision's being less common outside the United States, being practiced mainly by Muslims and Jews in Russia.

Playgirl UK's brief 2011 relaunch was accompanied by an announcement that it would feature no below-the-waist nudity, and would focus on attractive male celebrities rather than models and pornography actors. It was a failure, and ceased circulation soon after it began.

== See also ==
- Feminist pornography
- Sex-positive movement
- Sexual revolution
- G Magazine
- Cosmopolitan Magazine
