= Sepe =

Sepe may refer to:

- Sepe (surname)
- Sepé Tiaraju, Brazilian Guaraní tribe leader
- Sepe, a form of Kurdish dance
- São Sepe River, Brazilian river
- São Sepé, Brazilian town
