= Vanna White =

American game show personality (born 1957)

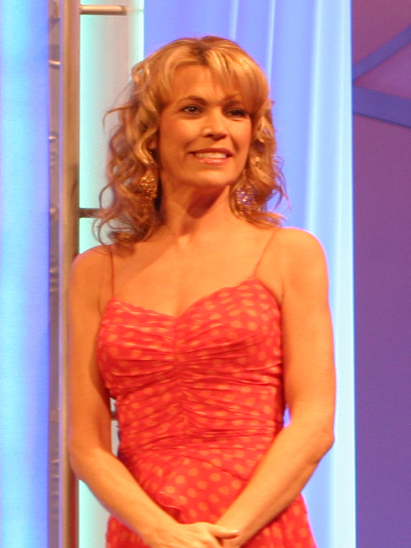
- White next to the puzzle board during a recording of Wheel of Fortune on February 8, 2006
- Born: Vanna Marie Rosich; February 18, 1957 (age 69); North Myrtle Beach, South Carolina, U.S.
- Occupations: Game-show co-host, television personality, model, actress
- Years active: 1980–present
- Known for: Wheel of Fortune
- Spouses: George Santo Pietro (m. 1990; div. 2002); John Donaldson (m. 2026)
- Partner: John Gibson (m. 1981; died 1986)
- Children: 2
- Awards: Hollywood Walk of Fame

Vanna Marie White (née Rosich; born February 18, 1957) is an American television personality. She is best known as the co-host of the game show Wheel of Fortune, a position she has held since 1982. She began her career as a model while studying fashion, competing in Miss Georgia USA in 1978. In addition to her work on Wheel of Fortune, she has played minor characters or appeared as herself in many films and television series, and is the author of the 1987 autobiography Vanna Speaks. She also participates in real-estate investment, owns the yarn brand Vanna's Choice, and is a patron of St. Jude Children's Research Hospital.

== Early life ==
Vanna Marie Rosich was born on February 18, 1957, near North Myrtle Beach in Horry County, South Carolina. She is the daughter of Joan Marie Nicholas and Miguel Angel Rosich. According to census records, her paternal great-great-grandparents, the Rosiches, were Spanish immigrants from Mallorca who settled in Ponce, Puerto Rico. When Vanna was an infant, her parents divorced. She was raised by her mother Joan and by Joan's second husband, Herbert White Jr. (1925–2022), a former real estate broker, in North Myrtle Beach. Vanna took White's surname. After graduating from high school, White moved to Atlanta, Georgia, where she attended the Atlanta School of Fashion and Design and worked as a model. White headed to Los Angeles in 1979 to pursue an acting career, but in the summer of 1980, she returned briefly to South Carolina to see her mother, who was dying of ovarian cancer.

== Career ==
=== Television, motion picture, and other media appearances ===
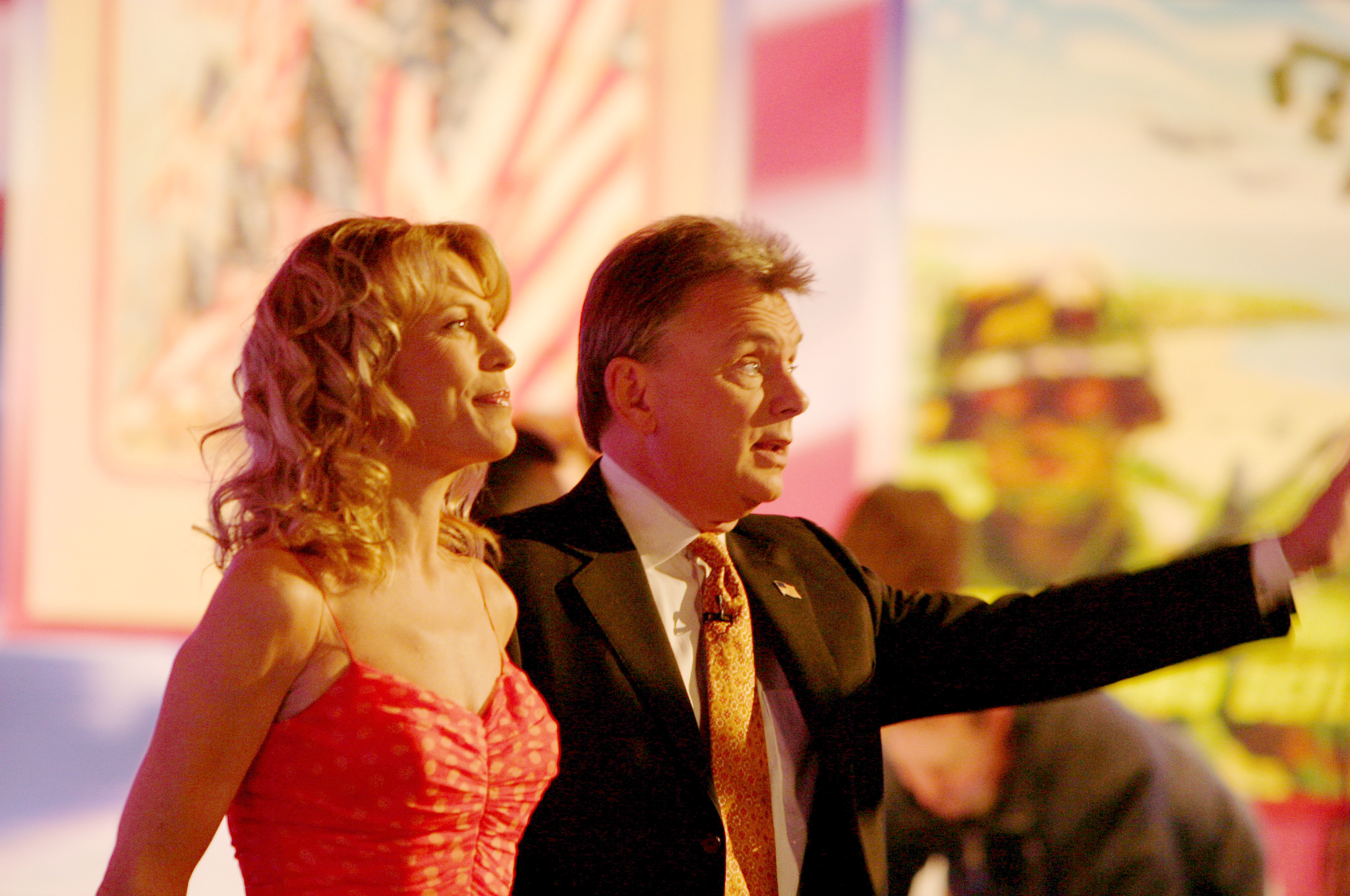
White with Pat Sajak in 2006

Before her appearance on TV, White was a contestant in the Miss Georgia USA 1978 pageant.

White's first appearance on a game show was as a 23-year-old contestant on the June 20, 1980, episode of The Price Is Right. She was among the first four contestants. White did not make it on stage, but the clip of her running to Contestants' Row was rebroadcast as part of The Price Is Right 25th Anniversary Special in August 1996 and The Price Is Right Celebrates 50 Years in September 2021 (in which she also appeared as a Guest Model during the show), and also was featured on the special broadcast Game Show Moments Gone Bananas.

In 1980, White acted in a film that was not completed; it was subsequently edited and released in June 1990 as Gypsy Angels. In 1981, she got a bit part in the film Looker and also appeared as Doris in the horror movie Graduation Day, an American slasher film directed by Herb Freed and produced by Troma Entertainment.

White's 1987 autobiography, Vanna Speaks!, was a best-seller. That same year, she was featured in a Playboy pictorial, showing photos taken of her before her career on Wheel of Fortune, wearing see-through lingerie. White starred as the title character, Venus, in the 1988 television movie Goddess of Love.

White guest-starred on Married... with Children; in a gender swap parody of the film Indecent Proposal, she had the Robert Redford role while Al Bundy had that of Demi Moore. White served as guest timekeeper and provided interviews from the backstage area throughout the evening for WrestleMania IV. In 1996, she was the main narrator and singer in the CD release of Leslie Bricusse's "Santa's Last Ride."

On April 20, 2006, White was honored with a star on the Hollywood Walk of Fame, with Pat Sajak, Merv Griffin, and Alex Trebek as key witnesses.

White presented a set of luggage in a special guest appearance on The Price Is Right Celebrates 50 Years in September 2021.

In May 2022, White appeared as a special guest in the seventh season of RuPaul's Drag Race: All Stars where the contestants did a runway in tribute to her past looks.

On April 21, 2023, it was announced that White would be featured in a four-episode documentary by ABC News titled The Game Show Show, covering the history of game shows in America over the last eight decades. The four-part documentary premiered on May 10, 2023.

=== Wheel of Fortune television game show ===
After Wheel of Fortune co-host Susan Stafford left in October 1982, White was selected as one of three substitutes (along with Vicki McCarty and Summer Bartholomew) to co-host the show. On December 13, 1982, White became the regular co-host. White missed a week of episodes on the daytime show in June 1986, with Stafford returning in her place, due to her taking a bereavement leave after her fiancé, John Gibson, died in a plane crash.

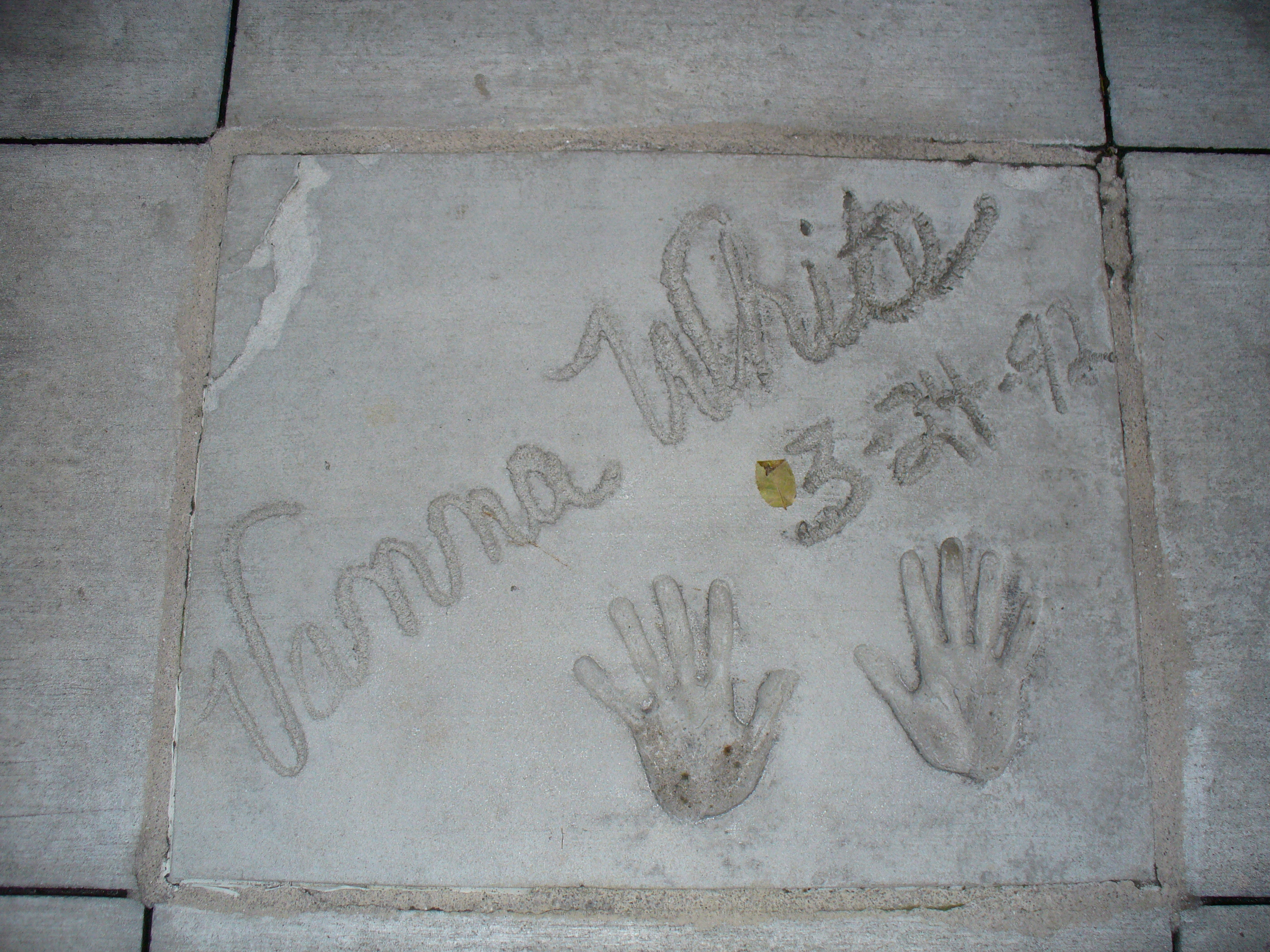
The handprints of Vanna White in front of Hollywood Hills Amphitheater at Walt Disney World's Disney's Hollywood Studios theme park

White temporarily took over hosting Wheel of Fortune as master of ceremonies starting with the week of episodes that were slated to air starting on December 9, 2019. The announcement was made after a taping day was postponed when Sajak was hospitalized with a blocked intestine and needed emergency surgery to clear it. White hosted that taping day and the subsequent rescheduled taping the next day. Guest letterer activators were used during her shows hosting; the weeks of December 9 and 16 had Mickey Mouse and Minnie Mouse during the Secret Santa Holiday Giveaway. Subsequently, the show went on hiatus during Christmas week (December 23, 2019) and then a week of previously taped "America's Game" episodes (Wheel tapes six episodes per day, with each studio audience receiving three shows each; the third show in the afternoon session is an "America's Game" episode) that Sajak hosted, before White returned to hosting on January 6, 2020, for a final week; she was assisted by a "special guest", Pat Sajak's daughter Maggie. Fully recovered from his surgery, Sajak returned to the show on December 5, 2019, with episodes airing on January 13, 2020.

White missed filming five episodes in August 2023 after contracting COVID-19. She was temporarily replaced by Bridgette Donald-Blue but returned in October 2023. Filming on additional episodes was delayed until after her recovery. This marked the first time that White had missed an episode since 1991.

Since 2021, White hosted Celebrity Wheel of Fortune on ABC with Sajak and later Ryan Seacrest beginning in September 2025. Later in the year it was announced that both Sajak and White had been signed on to continue as hosts of Wheel of Fortune through the 2023–24 season. She extended her contract on Celebrity Wheel of Fortune again in July 2023. In September 2023, White extended her contract as host of Wheel of Fortune through the 2025–26 season.

In May 2023, White competed as a contestant on a celebrity edition of Wheel of Fortune against Jeopardy! hosts Ken Jennings and Mayim Bialik. With her competing, Maggie Sajak filled in for White at the puzzle board.

=== World record ===
On the May 24, 2013, episode of Wheel of Fortune, White was presented with a Guinness World Record certificate for most frequent clapper. As of January 31, 2013, she had clapped an estimated 3,480,864 times across the show's 30 seasons. White had appeared in all but 10 of Wheel's 5,754 episodes to that point, during the show's modern syndicated run, which began on September 19, 1983. That works out to an average number of 606 claps per show.

== Personal life ==
In the 1980s, White dated and became engaged to soap opera actor John Gibson, a Playgirl magazine centerfold and Chippendales dancer. Gibson died in a 1986 airplane crash. In 1990, White married restaurant owner George Santo Pietro. She first became pregnant in September 1992. An episode of Wheel of Fortune contained "Vanna's pregnant" as the answer to a puzzle. She miscarried shortly after the episode's taping (thus causing the segment to be cut for sensitivity). White gave birth to a son, Nicholas, on June 11, 1994 and a daughter, Giovanna, on July 1, 1997 from her marriage to Santo Pietro. The couple divorced in November 2002. From 2004 to 2006, she was engaged to Southern California businessman Michael Kaye. The two never wed. Since 2012, White has been in a relationship with contractor John Donaldson, whom she met through mutual friends. The couple married in January 2026.

White is a Baptist.

White is sometimes described as the "niece" of actor Christopher George. While George is not a biological relation, White's mother grew up with him, and George and his wife took White "under their wing" in Los Angeles. In an interview with Larry King, White said that her children often come to Wheel of Fortune tapings.

== Litigation ==
In 1993, White sued Samsung Electronics over an advertisement featuring a robot turning letters on a game show, alleging a violation of her personality rights. The lower court's decision in Samsung's favor was reversed by the United States Court of Appeals for the Ninth Circuit, which denied a rehearing, but Judge Alex Kozinski issued a dissent. The U.S. Supreme Court denied certiorari. A jury awarded White $403,000 in damages.

== Filmography ==
=== Film ===
Year	Title	Role
1981	Graduation Day	Doris
1981	Looker	Reston Girl
1994	Naked Gun 33 1/3: The Final Insult	Herself
1994	Double Dragon	Herself

=== Television ===
Year	Title	Role	Notes
1981	Midnight Offerings	Devona	TV Movie
1982–present	Wheel of Fortune	Co-host	
1988	Goddess of Love	Venus	TV Movie
1988	Totally Minnie	Herself	TV Special
1989	The Super Mario Bros. Super Show!	Roxanne	Live Action Segment
1992	Captain Planet and the Planeteers	Laurie Saunders (Voice)	The Guinea Pigs (Season 3, Episode 7)
1993	Married... with Children	Coco/Helen Granowinner	Guest (season 7, episode 26)
1994	Full House	Herself/Mrs. Moffat	Guest (Season 7, Episode 15)
2021–present	Celebrity Wheel of Fortune	Co-Host	Contestant (Season 3, Episode 14)
2022	RuPaul's Drag Race: All Stars 7	Herself	Guest (season 7, episode 3)

== Publications ==
- White, Vanna (1987). Vanna Speaks. New York: Warner Books. ISBN 0-446-51366-0.

Media offices
Preceded by Susan Stafford	Wheel of Fortune Co-host; December 13, 1982 – present (Note: White temporarily replaced Pat Sajak as host during December 9, 2019–December 20, 2019, and January 6, 2020–January 10, 2020, while Sajak was recovering from surgery; rotating Disney personalities and Maggie Sajak filled in for White during this time)	Incumbent
