= Maggie Sajak =

American country music singer (born 1995)

- Born: Maggie Marie Sajak; January 5, 1995 (age 31); Baltimore, Maryland, U.S.
- Occupations: Television personality, singer
- Father: Pat Sajak
- Musical career
- Origin: Baltimore, Maryland, U.S.
- Genres: Country, country pop
- Instruments: Guitar, vocals
- Years active: 2011–present
- Label: AO Recordings

Maggie Marie Sajak (born January 5, 1995) is an American television personality and country music singer. She is the daughter of former Wheel of Fortune host Pat Sajak and photographer Lesly Brown Sajak. She is the on-air social media correspondent for the game show, and a special Super Bowl correspondent for Inside Edition.

== Early life ==
Maggie Marie Sajak was born on January 5, 1995, to television host Pat Sajak and his wife, Lesly. She has an older brother, Patrick, who is a doctor. She grew up near Severna Park, Maryland. She began playing the guitar at age 12. In 2012, Sajak graduated from Severn School, a college preparatory day school. In 2013, Sajak began her freshman year at Princeton University. She graduated from the university in 2016 did an additional postgraduate program at Columbia University in New York City. In May 2023, she graduated from the Georgetown University Law School.

== Career ==
=== Music career ===
In 2011, she released her first single, "First Kiss". The music video for "First Kiss" was directed by Trey Fanjoy in Nashville. Sajak's video was featured on the January 3, 2012, episode of Wheel of Fortune on her 17th birthday. In 2013, Sajak recorded a song in Nashville called "Live Out Loud" to honor Muriel Walters, a teenage girl in Maryland who was suffering from cancer. Soon afterward, one of her songs was featured in the season finale of a TV show, Sweet Home Alabama.

=== Media career ===
In 2013, Sajak was featured in a fashion shoot for Teen Vogue.

Since 2023, Sajak has been a special Super Bowl correspondent for Inside Edition.

=== Wheel of Fortune ===
In January 2020, Maggie Sajak took over for Vanna White for a week of episodes of Wheel of Fortune, with White filling in as host at the same time when then-current host Pat Sajak was undergoing surgery. Beginning with the 2021–2022 season, Maggie joined Wheel as a social media correspondent. In May 2023, she filled in for Vanna White for a Celebrity Wheel of Fortune episode in which White was a contestant herself. Sajak began work on Wheel of Fortune during her father's last couple of years with the show.

In April 2023, Sajak appeared on Windy City Weekend on WLS-TV for a special episode to promote the show's Great American Cities Week in which she shared some insights into her role as a social correspondent and received a surprise taste of local cuisine from Portillo's.

In November 2025, Sajak collaborated with the stars of Days of Our Lives to promote a crossover tied to Wheel of Fortune to commemorate the soap opera's 60th anniversary. Sajak made a surprise appearance on the set in Salem, Massachusetts where she announced the "Friday Funday" giveaway, which offered fans prizes like walk-on roles on the soap opera and themed experiences, which also spinning a custom wheel alongside the show's cast members Deidre Hall and Jackee Harry.

== Personal life ==
Sajak has been in a relationship with Savannah Bananas player Jackson Olson since April 2026.

Sajak is an advocate for animal welfare, having promoted shelter adoptions on social media which encourages others to do the same. In 2022, she adopted a dog named Jak from a local shelter.

== Discography ==
- First Kiss (AO Recordings, 2011)

=== Music videos ===
Year	Video	Director
2012	"First Kiss"	Trey Fanjoy
2013	"Wild Boy"	Jenny Gage & Tom Betterton

=== Television ===
- Wheel of Fortune (5 episodes in 2020, social media correspondent since 2021)
- Celebrity Wheel of Fortune (1 episode in 2023)
- Inside Edition (special Super Bowl correspondent since 2023)

== Soundtracks ==
- "Sweet Home Alabama" on CMT, episode 1.08: "Finale" – with "First Kiss"
