= Susan Stafford =

American actress

- Born: January 27, 1944 (age 82); Lynn, Massachusetts, U.S.
- Occupations: Game show co-host; author; clinical psychologist; chaplain; former model
- Years active: 1970–present
- Spouses: Gordon McLendon (m. 1973; div. 1975); Dick Ebersol (m. 1976; ann. 1981)
- Partner: Dan Enright (1983–1992; his death)

Susan Stafford (born January 27, 1944) is an American former model, actress and television host. She is best known as the original hostess of Wheel of Fortune whom she hosted alongside Chuck Woolery and later Pat Sajak from 1975 to 1982.

== Early life ==
Stafford was born on January 27, 1944 in Lynn, Massachusetts. She grew up in Missouri and won several beauty contests as a teenager in Kansas City.

== Career ==
Stafford was the original daytime hostess of the American game show Wheel of Fortune from January 6, 1975 until her departure on October 22, 1982. She returned to Wheel of Fortune in 1986 to substitute for Vanna White.

Stafford returned to television in 1988 as host of Alive, which aired on the Christian Broadcasting Network and in syndication. In 2003, Stafford made her first game show appearance since Wheel of Fortune, appearing on Hollywood Squares Game Show Week (Part 2).

=== Other work ===
In 2011, Stafford published her first book, Stop the Wheel, I Want to Get Off.

In 2020, during the COVID-19 pandemic, Stafford started hosting a podcast entitled Out of the Box with Susan Stafford where she interviewed celebrities and industry figures of topics which ranged from career challenges to personal growth and wellness.

== Personal life ==
In 1973, Stafford married radio pioneer Gordon McLendon, and was then married to Dick Ebersol of NBC Sports and Saturday Night Live in 1976. Ebersol and Stafford were married on a beach in Malibu. Their wedding was attended by John Belushi, Chevy Chase, and SNL producer Lorne Michaels. After they exchanged vows, Chase jokingly grabbed Stafford and threw her into the ocean. According to People magazine, "[they] parted 18 months later." Their marriage was annulled in 1981. Stafford later was a companion of game show producer Dan Enright from 1983 until his death in 1992.

== Accolades ==
In 2005, a Golden Palm Star on the Palm Springs, California, Walk of Stars was dedicated to her.
