= Hager Twins =

American country music singers (1941-2008, -2009)

- Born: August 30, 1941; Chicago, Illinois, U.S.
- Died: Jim Hager: May 1, 2008 (aged 66); Jon Hager: January 9, 2009 (aged 67); Nashville, Tennessee, U.S. (both)
- Other names: Hager Brothers; The Hagers
- Occupations: Country music singers and comedians

The Hager Twins, also known as the Hager Brothers and The Hagers, were a duo of American country music singers and comedians who gained fame on the TV series Hee Haw. They were identical twin brothers James Henry Hager (August 30, 1941 – May 1, 2008) and John William Hager (August 30, 1941 – January 9, 2009).

== Biography ==
The brothers were born on August 30, 1941, in Chicago, Illinois, and adopted by Jack and Frances Hager, a Methodist minister and a schoolteacher.

They first sang in the church choir. As teenagers they sang on a Saturday morning WGN-TV series targeting others in their age group. Both brothers served in the United States Army and performed at officers' and non-commissioned officers' clubs in the United States and Europe.

They attended Maine Township High School in Park Ridge (Class of 1959), one year ahead of Harrison Ford and a few years ahead of Hillary Clinton.

After leaving the military, the Hager brothers moved to California and performed at the Ledbetter's Night Club in Los Angeles with The Carpenters, The New Christy Minstrels, John Denver, Steve Martin, and Kenny Rogers. They also worked at Disneyland, where Buck Owens saw them perform and signed them to contracts. The brothers served as opening acts for Owens, Tex Ritter, Wynn Stewart, Billie Jo Spears, and Lefty Frizzell.

They first came to national prominence on the CBS television series Hee Haw, on which both were cast members from 1969 to 1986. In 1979 they appeared on the nationally-syndicated New Soupy Sales Show, singing "Pizza Man."

The Hager brothers signed with Capitol Records in 1969 and hit the country charts with "Gotta Get To Oklahoma ('Cause California's Gettin' To Me)". They also charted Merle Haggard's "Silver Wings", which was the B-Side of Haggard's "Working Man Blues." In all, they recorded seven albums—three for Capitol, two for Elektra-Asylum, one for Barnaby Records, and one for Book Shop Records.

The brothers were featured in the second preview issue of Playgirl, February 1973.

Their TV appearances also include the original The Bionic Woman, in which Jim and Jon played cloned detectives Verm and Dier in the February 11, 1978, episode "Sanctuary Earth."

In 1976, the brothers starred as private detectives opposite Lillian Gish in the TV-movie Twin Detectives. They also appeared in TV commercials and with Florence Henderson in Country Kitchen on TNN.

The Hager Brothers also contributed to numerous charities.

Jim Hager collapsed in the parking lot of a Nashville coffee shop. He died of an apparent heart attack at a hospital on May 1, 2008, in Nashville, Tennessee, at age 66. Jon Hager died in his sleep on January 9, 2009, also in Nashville, at age 67.

== Discography ==
=== Albums ===
Year	Album	Label
1970	The Hagers	Capitol
1970	Two Hagers Are Better Than One	Capitol
1971	Motherhood, Apple Pie and the Flag	Capitol
1972	Music on the Country Side	Barnaby
1974	The Hagers	Elektra
1986	The Hagers	Book Shop International

=== Singles ===
Year	Single	Chart Positions		Album
Year	Single	US Country	CAN Country	Album
1969	"Gotta Get to Oklahoma ('Cause California's Gettin' to Me)" - songwriters: Rodney Lay & Buck Owens	41	9	The Hagers (1970)
1970	"Loneliness Without You" - songwriters: Shannon Lindell & Jim Hager	74	—	The Hagers (1970)
1970	"Goin' Home to Your Mother" - songwriter: Ted Anderson	50	—	The Hagers (1970)
1970	"Silver Wings" - songwriter: Merle Haggard	59	—	Two Hagers Are Better Than One
1971	"I'm Miles Away" - songwriter: Robert McCoy	47	38	Two Hagers Are Better Than One
1971	"White Line Fever" - songwriter: Merle Haggard	—	—	Motherhood, Apple Pie and the Flag
1972	"Ain't No Sunshine" - songwriter: B. Withers	—	—	Music on the Country Side
1972	"The Cost of Love Is Getting Higher" - songwriters: Jim McBride & Roger Murrah	—	—	Music on the Country Side
1972	"I Just Don't Feel at Home" - songwriter: Jim McBride	—	—	Music on the Country Side
1973	"A Fool Such as I" - songwriter: Bill Trader	—	—	single only
1974	"Love My Life Away" - songwriter: Gene Pitney	—	—	The Hagers (1974)
1974	"All Your Love" songwriters: Jim Hager & Stan House	—	—	The Hagers (1974)
1975	"Heartaches by the Number" - songwriter: Harlan Howard	—	—	singles only
1975	"Hot Lips" - songwriter: George Tomsco	—	—	singles only
