= Ryan MacDonald (American actor) =

American actor (1930–2020)

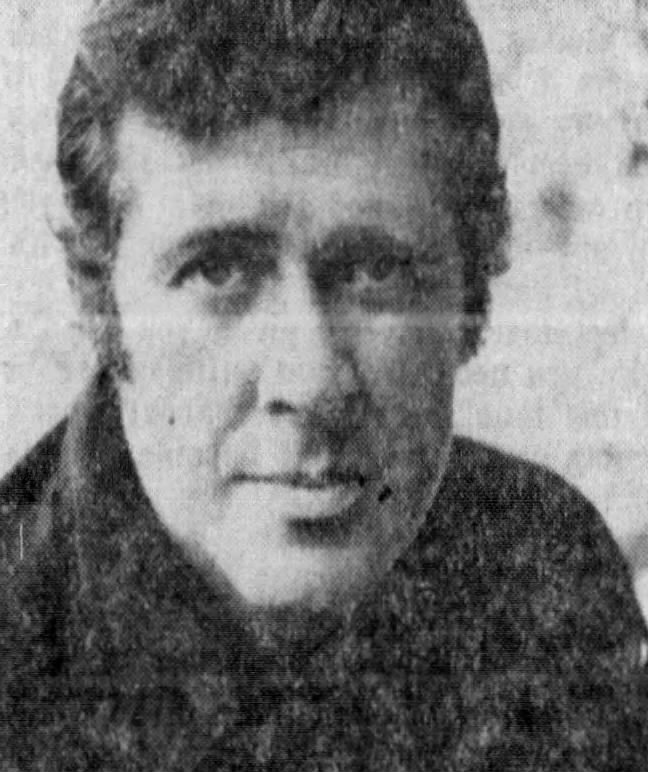
- MacDonald in 1973
- Born: Adam Machunas; September 4, 1930; Philadelphia, Pennsylvania, U.S.
- Died: February 13, 2020 (aged 89); Hollywood, California, U.S.
- Education: John Bartram High School
- Occupation: Actor
- Years active: 1954–2012
- Spouses: Alberta Nelson (m. 1961; div. ?); Barbara Andrews m. 1965; div. 1969

Ryan MacDonald (né Machunas; September 4, 1930 – February 13, 2020) was an American film, television, and stage actor. He was best known for playing the recurring role of Roy in the first season of the American sitcom television series The Odd Couple, and was also known for playing Scott Banning in the NBC soap opera television series Days of Our Lives, a performance whose popularity would, in turn, lead to MacDonald being the subject of a seven-page photo spread in the inaugural issue of Playgirl Magazine.

== Early life and career ==
Born Adam Machunas in Philadelphia, Pennsylvania, MacDonald was the brother of stage actress Florence Alberta Machunas, the son of Lithuanian-American U.S. Army Captain Adam William Machunas, and his Lithuanian-born wife, the former Mrs. Victoria Wosinko (as well as the half-brother of the latter's children by her previous marriage).

As of 1940, it appears that the Machunas family had become, at least intermittently, a single-parent household. In this light, an unrelated news story reveals that Capt. Machunas—who would die just three years later with no cause of death disclosed—had, as early as November 1938, been reported to be residing at Philadelphia's Naval Hospital, "suffering with a heart condition." MacDonald's own recollection, as reflected in comments made in 1973 by his then-press agent, Bobby Karp, does nothing to contradict that picture, apart, perhaps, from suggesting an even earlier onset.

Ryan was raised in a houseful of women. His dad was gone while he was growing up. He lived with his mother and many sisters.

MacDonald—as Ryan Machunas—began acting no later than 1945, when, at age 14, he performed on an episode of Science Is Fun, a weekly radio program airing on Philadelphia's WFIL. He later attended John Bartram High School, graduating in 1948.

On October 3, 1952, in Hopewell, Virginia, he was one of "five new faces" whose local stage debut was deemed front page news by that day's Hopewell News. All five performers are prominently displayed in the photo accompanying the story, characterized as "veteran performers with experience in little theater, summer theater, and radio."

In 1954, having by then adopted his better known stage name, MacDonald began his screen acting career, playing the role of Professor Paul Britton #4 in the soap opera The Secret Storm. Later in his career, he appeared in three Broadway plays, Toys in the Attic, Any Wednesday, and Catch Me If You Can.

In March 1963, having just taken Scott McKay's place for 14 performances in the Chicago production of Jean Kerr's Mary, Mary, MacDonald was called to replace an ailing Donald Harron in the London production, appearing alongside Maggie Smith and fellow import Ron Randell. Regarding his performance in particular, Bolton News theatre critic G.F.T. was especially appreciative.

This is a very funny play mainly concerning the strained reunion of a divorced couple, played by Smith and a very good trans-Atlantic actor, Ryan MacDonald, who was flown over from the States to replace Donald Harron [...] Mr. Harron, I believe, was excellent. I did not see him; but Ryan MacDonald is splendid and a good foil to Miss Smith. He certainly eclipses the Hollywood film star, Ron Randell, who gives a very limp performance as a Hollywood film star.

In 1970 MacDonald was cast as Roy, Oscar Madison's accountant and one of his poker cronies in the television series The Odd Couple, only appearing in the first season. The following year, he became the fourth and final actor—following Bob Carraway, Mike Farrell, and Robert Hogan—cast as Scott Banning on the daytime soap opera Days of Our Lives, playing the part from 1971 through 1973, when the character was "killed off".

In 1973, in the wake of Scott Banning's demise and a subsequent poll whose voters deemed MacDonald the man most American women would wish to see unclothed, the actor obliged by becoming one of two celebrities whose in-the-buff photo spreads adorn the debut issue of the women's magazine Playgirl.

MacDonald guest-starred in numerous television programs including Nanny and the Professor, The Rockford Files, Police Woman, Mannix, The Doris Day Show, Quincy, M.E., Columbo, Hart to Hart, Emergency!, The Greatest American Hero, The Facts of Life, Barnaby Jones, The Six Million Dollar Man, Here's Lucy, The Streets of San Francisco, Remington Steele, Quantum Leap, Knots Landing, and Newhart. He later appeared in another recurring role in Days of Our Lives, as shady lawyer Chauncey Powell from 1991 to 1992.

== Personal life and death ==
Both of MacDonald's marriages ended in divorce; first, to actress Alberta Nelson, and, from 1965 to 1969, to Dean Martin dancer Barbara Andrews.

MacDonald died on February 13, 2020 in Hollywood, California, at the age of 89.
