= Lou Zivkovich =

Canadian football player

Lou Zivkovich was a defensive end for the Calgary Stampeders in the Canadian Football League (CFL). He is widely known for appearing as the July 1974 centerfold in Playgirl at the age of 33.

== Early life ==
Zivkovic is the son of Canadian immigrants. He attended the University of Miami where he received a degree in Physical Education and English.

== Playgirl pictorial ==
In this photo spread, (taken during an expense paid trip to Hawaii), the muscular and hirsute Zivkovich displayed his 6'4" 216 lb. physique—46" chest and 35" waist—in a series of shots which consistently featured full-frontal nudity.

Copies of the magazine quickly became something of a collector's item and even sparked brief talk of an acting career for Zivkovich. (He played a supporting role in an episode of McMillan and Wife, which aired on October 26, 1975.)

However, there were unfortunate ramifications. The high school in Apple Valley, California, where Zivkovich worked as a physical education teacher fired him, charging that his appearance in a nude centerfold showed he was not a proper role model for students. Many students as well as fellow teachers then came to the defense of Zivkovich, who stated: "I don't see anything wrong with a nude body that is a work of art." The case went to a state appeals panel which admonished Zivkovich for a "mistake in judgment" but ruled in March 1975 that he could not be fired.

One year later, in March 1976, Zivkovich—along with a bevy of musclemen—appeared with Mae West in a TV special titled "Dick Cavett's Backlot USA." Mae West's biographer, Simon Louvish, describes Zivkovich at this point as being Mae West's "frequent escort."
