= Wheel of Fortune (American game show) =

American television game show

- Also known as: Wheel
- Genre: Game show
- Created by: Merv Griffin
- Directed by: Jeff Goldstein; Dick Carson; Mark Corwin; Bob Cisneros; Robert Ennis; Alex Van Wagner
- Presented by: Chuck Woolery; Pat Sajak; Rolf Benirschke; Bob Goen; Susan Stafford; Vanna White; Ryan Seacrest
- Announcer: Charlie O'Donnell; Jack Clark; M. G. Kelly; Jim Thornton
- Theme music composer: Alan Thicke; Merv Griffin; Steve Kaplan; Frankie Blue; John Hoke; Bleeding Fingers Music
- Ending theme: "Changing Keys"
- Country of origin: United States
- Original language: English
- No. of seasons: syndication: 43
- No. of episodes: 3,686 (NBC; 1975–1989) syndication: ca. 8000

Production
- Executive producers: Merv Griffin (1975–2000); Harry Friedman (1999–2020); Mike Richards (2020–2021); Steve Schwartz (2021–2022) (Note: Uncredited as Executive Producer, credited as Supervising Producer.); Bellamie Blackstone (2022–present)
- Producer: See below
- Production locations: NBC Studios, Burbank, California (1975–1989); Television City, Los Angeles, California (1989–1995); Sony Pictures Studios Stage 11, Culver City, California; (1995–present)
- Running time: approx. 22 minutes
- Production companies: Merv Griffin Enterprises (Note: As Merv Griffin Productions from 1973 to 1984.) (1984–1994); CBS Media Ventures (Note: Broadcast prints only; CBS Broadcasting was the temporary broadcast distributor from 2024 to 2025.) (Note: As CBS Television Distribution from 2007 to 2021.) (2006–present); Sony Pictures (Note: As Columbia TriStar Television from 1994 to 2001, Columbia TriStar Domestic Television from 2001 to 2002, Sony Pictures Television from 2002 to 2020 and 2023 to 2026, and Sony Pictures Television Studios from 2020 to 2023) (1994–present)

Original release
- Network: NBC
- Release: January 6, 1975 – June 30, 1989
- Network: Syndication
- Release: September 19, 1983 – present
- Network: CBS
- Release: July 17, 1989 – January 11, 1991
- Network: NBC
- Release: January 14 – September 20, 1991

Related
- Wheel 2000; Celebrity Wheel of Fortune

Wheel of Fortune (often known simply as Wheel (Note: The simplified title was often used by former host Pat Sajak on-air and has been used instead of the full title in numerous promotional materials for the show.)) is an American television game show created by Merv Griffin. The show has aired continuously since January 6, 1975. Contestants solve word puzzles, similar to those in hangman, to win cash and prizes determined by spinning a giant carnival wheel. The current version of the series, which airs in nightly syndication, premiered on September 19, 1983. Since September 9, 2024, the show has been hosted by Ryan Seacrest and Vanna White.

The original version of Wheel was a network daytime series that ran on NBC from January 6, 1975, to June 30, 1989, and subsequently aired on CBS from July 17, 1989, to January 11, 1991; it returned to NBC on January 14, 1991, and was cancelled that year, ending on September 20, 1991. The network daytime and syndicated nighttime versions aired concurrently from 1983 until the former's conclusion. Chuck Woolery and Susan Stafford were the original hosts of the daytime network version. Woolery left in 1981, and was replaced by Pat Sajak. Sajak left the network version in January 1989 to host his own late-night talk show. Succeeding Sajak on the daytime version was Rolf Benirschke, who was in turn replaced by Bob Goen when the network show moved to CBS. Stafford left in 1982 and was replaced by Vanna White, who remained on the network show for the rest of its run. Sajak and White hosted the nighttime Wheel together from its premiere until June 2024, when Sajak retired and was replaced by Seacrest. Charlie O'Donnell, Jack Clark, and M.G. Kelly all served as announcers prior to Jim Thornton taking over in 2011; Thornton was fired from the show in September 2026.

Currently in its 44th season, Wheel of Fortune ranks as the longest-running syndicated game show in the United States, with 8,000 episodes taped and aired as of June 7, 2024. In addition, Wheel of Fortune is the second longest-running game show in the United States, behind The Price is Right, which has aired continuously since September 1972 and is now in its 55th season. TV Guide named Wheel of Fortune the "top-rated syndicated series" in a 2008 article, and in 2013, the magazine ranked it at number two in its list of the 60 greatest game shows ever. The program has also come to gain a worldwide following with 60 international adaptations. Two spin-off versions have existed as well: a children's version called Wheel 2000, which aired simultaneously on CBS and Game Show Network in 1997 and 1998; and Celebrity Wheel of Fortune, which began airing on ABC in 2021 and features a modified version of the format.

== Gameplay ==
=== Main game ===
Wheel of Fortune is based on hangman. In each round, players compete to be the first to guess the answer to a word puzzle. At the start of each round, the host reveals the category. Most puzzles are common figures of speech. In general, puzzles must be read exactly when solved, except for crossword puzzles (which were added to the show in 2016) where the host gives a clue linking the words and contestants may give the words in any order, so long as all words are given without repeating or adding any. Most matches consist of three contestants, although some variants feature three teams of two people each. (Note: If a contestant cannot spin the wheel due to a physical limitation or disability, they are accompanied by a "designated spinner", a friend or family member who spins for them but is otherwise not involved in the game.) Puzzles come in two varieties: "toss-up" puzzles and regular rounds of gameplay.

"Toss-up" puzzles reveal the letters randomly, one at a time, and allow contestants to ring in with a buzzer when they think they know the answer. Each episode begins with a series of toss-up puzzles collectively known as the "Fortune Frenzy". All puzzles in this round have the same category and are played against a 30-second clock. Ringing in with a correct answer during the "Fortune Frenzy" awards $1,000 cash, while an incorrect answer discards the puzzle. More puzzles are played until time expires, and answers given after the buzzer are counted if the contestant still rings in before time expires.

After the Fortune Frenzy is finished, regular rounds of gameplay begin, using the show's titular wheel. The device is a roulette-style wheel with 24 wedges. Most are labeled with dollar amounts ranging from $500 to $900, with a top value in each round: $2,500 in round 1, $3,500 in rounds 2 and 3, and $5,000 for round 4 and any subsequent rounds. The wheel also features two Bankrupt wedges and one Lose a Turn wedge. Landing on either forfeits the contestant's turn, with the Bankrupt wedge also eliminating any cash or prizes the contestant has accumulated within the round. The contestant who gave the last correct answer during the Fortune Frenzy begins the first round of regular gameplay. Landing on a dollar amount and calling a correct consonant results in the co-host revealing every instance of that letter, and awards the value of the spin multiplied by the number of times the letter appears in the puzzle. After a correct consonant, a contestant may choose to spin again, buy a vowel for a flat rate of $250 (until no more remain in the puzzle), or attempt to solve the puzzle. Control passes to the next contestant clockwise if the contestant lands on Lose a Turn or Bankrupt, calls a letter not in the puzzle, calls a letter already called in that round, attempts unsuccessfully to solve the puzzle, or takes too much time to call a letter or decide on their next action. Two more rounds are then played, each started by the next two contestants clockwise from whichever contestant began the first round. Games typically last to a minimum of four rounds outside the toss-ups, with more played if time permits.

In Rounds 1-3, one wedge on the wheel also contains a Wild Card. A contestant who claims the Wild Card by calling a correct consonant may use it after any following correct consonant to call a second one for the same value as the last spin; alternatively, the Wild Card may also be retained for use in the bonus round. Also featured on the wheel is a "Million Dollar Wedge" which is also acquired by calling a correct consonant and allows the chance to play for a $1,000,000 cash prize in the bonus round.

The second round is the Mystery Round. Two of the wedges on the wheel are obscured with "mystery wedges". Upon landing on one and calling a correct consonant, the contestant may choose to take the mystery wedge's face value of $1,000 per correct consonant, or forfeit that amount to turn over the wedge and see if it contains a Bankrupt or $10,000 cash prize. If one has been flipped over, then the other may not be flipped if it landed on later in the round. In the third round, the wheel features an "express" wedge. After calling a correct consonant on Express, a contestant may choose to "hop on Express" and call consonants for $1,000 per occurrence, while also retaining the ability to buy vowels, but at the risk of an incorrect consonant at any point acting as a Bankrupt. Round 3 is also the Prize Puzzle, awarding a trip to the contestant who solves.

After the third round, the contestants play another set of toss-up puzzles, collectively known as the "Triple Toss-Up". Three consecutive toss-up puzzles are played, all with the same category. Unlike the Fortune Frenzy, giving a wrong answer does not discard the puzzle, but instead allows any remaining contestants to attempt to ring in. The contestant who solves the final Triple Toss-Up spins first in the following round. A correct answer awards $2,000 cash; solving all three augments total winnings for the round to $10,000.

The last round is always played at least in part as a "speed-up". The contestant in control of the wheel at the start of the speed-up round spins the wheel once (known as a "final spin"). Prior to season 39, the final spin was performed by the host. If the final spin lands on something other than a dollar amount, it is typically edited out and another final spin performed until the wheel lands on a cash value. The amount on which the final spin lands has $1,000 added, and becomes the value of correct consonants (still multipled per occurrence) for the rest of the game, while vowels are free. Contestants call one letter at a time and, after the co-host clears the board, are given three seconds to attempt to solve. Time expiring is indicated by a buzzer sounding, and a contestant may make multiple guesses during the three seconds, with a correct answer being accepted so long as it is begun on or before the buzzer without hesitation.

A contestant must solve a puzzle in order to keep any cash, prizes, or extras accumulated during that round except for the Wild Card. Bankrupt does not affect score from previous rounds or prizes from previous rounds, but it takes away the Wild Card and/or the Million Dollar Wedge if either was claimed in a previous round. Contestants who solve a round for less than $1,000 in cash and prizes ($2,000 on weeks with two-contestant teams) have their scores increased to that amount. After the "speed-up" round is solved, the contestant with the highest total proceeds to the bonus round. If a tie for first place occurs after the speed-up, an additional Toss-Up worth $1,000 is played to break the tie.

=== Bonus round ===
Before the bonus round, the winning contestant is presented one of three categories to play in the bonus round; prior to 2017, the category was pre-determined. After doing so, the contestant spins a smaller wheel with 24 envelopes to determine the prize. The puzzle is revealed, as are every instances of the letters R, S, T, L, N, and E. The contestant provides three more consonants and one more vowel, plus a fourth consonant if the contestant has retained the Wild Card. After any instances of those letters are revealed, the contestant has ten seconds to solve the puzzle; as in the speed-up round, multiple guesses are allowed, so long as the answer is started before the time expires. Whether or not the contestant solves the puzzle, the host opens the envelope at the end of the round to reveal the prize at stake. Prizes include cash amounts ranging from $40,000 to $100,000, along with a vehicle which is typically changed out every week.

If the contestant has the Million Dollar Wedge, the $100,000 envelope is replaced with a $1,000,000 envelope. On the syndicated version, contestants who win the $1,000,000 may receive it in installments over 20 years, or in a lump sum of that amount's present value. As of October 2025, four contestants have won the $1,000,000 prize on the syndicated version: Michelle Loewenstein, Autumn Erhard, Sarah Manchester, and Christina Derevjanik. The latter also achieved the show's biggest overall winnings record of $1,035,155 in October 2025. In addition to these, Melissa Joan Hart won the top prize on Celebrity Wheel of Fortune on October 17, 2021.

=== Previous rules ===
Originally, after winning a round, contestants used their winnings to purchase prizes in showcases that were presented onstage, referred to as a "shopping round". At any time during a shopping round, a contestant could choose to put winnings either on a gift certificate or "on account" for use in a later shopping round. Money put "on account" was lost if the contestant hit Bankrupt or failed to solve another puzzle. The shopping element was eliminated from the syndicated version on the episode that aired October 5, 1987, both to speed up gameplay and to ameliorate the taxes paid by contestants. However, the network version continued to use shopping until the end of its first NBC run on June 30, 1989.

Before the introduction of toss-up puzzles in 2000, the contestant at the red arrow always started the first round, with the next contestant clockwise starting each subsequent round. In addition, ties for first place were broken by another speed-up round. If a tie for first place occurred on the daytime version, all three players returned to continue the game on the next episode, and it counted as a single appearance. The wheel formerly featured a Free Spin wedge, which automatically awarded a token that the contestant could turn in after a lost turn to keep control of the wheel. It was replaced in 1989 with a single Free Spin token placed over a selected cash wedge. Free Spin was retired in 2009. From 2009 to 2021, it was replaced by Free Play, a wedge that allowed a contestant to call any consonant or a free vowel, with no penalty if the letter was not in the puzzle or had already been called in the round.

Between September 16, 1996 and 2013, the show featured a progressive Jackpot wedge, which had been in several different rounds in its history. (Note: The jackpot wedge was originally in round 3, was moved to round two at the start of the season in 2000, and after that moved to round one from 2009 to 2013.) The jackpot began at $5,000 and had the value of every spin within the round added to it. To claim the jackpot, a contestant had to land on the wedge, call a correct letter, and solve the puzzle all in the same turn. In later years, it also offered $500 per correct letter and $500 to the jackpot, regardless of whether or not it was won in that turn.

The network version allowed champions to appear for up to five days originally, which was later reduced to three. The syndicated version, which originally retired contestants after one episode, adopted the three-day champion rule in 1989. In 1996, this was changed to have the top three winners from the week's first four shows return to compete in the "Friday Finals". When the jackpot wedge was introduced, it began at $10,000 instead of $5,000 on Fridays. The rules allowing returning champions were eliminated permanently beginning with the syndicated episode aired September 21, 1998, and contestants appear on only a single episode, reverting to the pre-1989 rules. The Friday Finals are occasionally used for special themed weeks, such as in nighttime season 40, using teams consisting of contestants and WWE Superstars as part of WrestleMania 39.

Before December 1981, the show did not feature a bonus round. However, two experimental bonus rounds were attempted before then. In 1978, some episodes featured a round known as the "Star Bonus", where a star-shaped token was placed on the wheel. Contestants who picked up the token played an additional round at the end of the game to win one of four prizes, whose value determined the difficulty of the puzzle. The contestant provided four consonants and a vowel, and was given fifteen seconds to attempt solving. In one week of episodes airing in March 1980, contestants who won the main game were given 30 seconds to attempt solving a puzzle for a chance to win a luxury automobile, in a week called "Super Wheel Bonus Week". When the current bonus round was introduced in 1981, no letters were provided automatically. Contestants chose five consonants and a vowel, and then had fifteen seconds to attempt solving the puzzle after their letters were revealed. Also, bonus prizes were selected by the contestant at the start of the round. The current time limit and rules for letter selection were introduced on October 3, 1988. In the nighttime version, from season 7 to season 19 (September 4, 1989 to October 19, 2001), bonus prizes were selected by the contestant choosing from one of five envelopes labeled W, H, E, E, and L. One prize was always $25,000 in cash, and the rest were changed weekly, though one prize was usually a car. Any prize that was won was taken out of rotation for the rest of the week. From 1998 to 2001, the $25,000 remained in-place for each episode during the entire week, regardless if it was won. In 2001, three car envelopes and two $25,000 envelopes were available the entire week of shows. The five-envelope format was replaced by the current bonus wheel on October 22, 2001. From season 19 to 27, the minimum cash value was $25,000. From season 28 to 31, the minimum cash value was $30,000. From season 32 to 39, the minimum was $1,000 multiplied by the season number.

== Conception and development ==
Merv Griffin conceived Wheel of Fortune using inspiration from hangman, which he would play with his sister on family road trips. After he discussed the idea with Merv Griffin Enterprises' staff, they thought that the idea would work as a game show if it had a "hook". He decided to add a roulette-style wheel because he was always "drawn to" such wheels when he saw them in casinos. He and Merv Griffin Enterprises' then-president Murray Schwartz consulted an executive of Caesars Palace to find out how to build such a wheel.

When Griffin pitched the idea for the show to Lin Bolen, then the head of NBC's daytime programming division, she approved, but wanted the show to have more glamour to attract the female audience. She suggested that Griffin incorporate a shopping element into the gameplay, and so, in 1973, he created a pilot episode titled Shopper's Bazaar, with Chuck Woolery as host and Mike Lawrence as announcer. The pilot started with the three contestants being introduced individually, with Lawrence describing the prizes that they chose to play for. The main game was played to four rounds, with the values on the wheel wedges increasing after the second round. Unlike the show it evolved into, Shopper's Bazaar had a vertically mounted wheel, which was spun automatically rather than by the contestants. This wheel lacked the Bankrupt wedge and featured a wedge where a contestant could call a vowel for free, as well as a "Your Own Clue" wedge that allowed contestants to pick up a rotary telephone and hear a private clue about the puzzle. At the end of the game, the highest-scoring contestant played a bonus round called the "Shopper's Special" where all the vowels in the puzzle were already there, and the contestant had 30 seconds to call out consonants in the puzzle.

Edd Byrnes, an actor from 77 Sunset Strip, served as host for the second and third pilots, both titled Wheel of Fortune. These pilots were directed by Marty Pasetta, who gave the show an aesthetic that more closely resembled the look and feel that the actual show ended up having, a wheel that was now spun by the contestants themselves, and a lighted mechanical puzzle board with letters that were now manually turnable. Showcase prizes on these pilots were located behind the puzzle board, and during shopping segments a list of prizes and their price values scrolled on the right of the screen. By the time production began in December 1974, Woolery was selected to host, the choice being made by Griffin after he reportedly heard Byrnes reciting "A-E-I-O-U" to himself in an effort to remember the vowels. In his autobiography, Byrnes acknowledged being intoxicated during the pilot's taping. Susan Stafford turned the letters on Byrnes' pilot episodes, a role that she also held when the show was picked up as a series.

== Personnel ==
=== Hosts ===
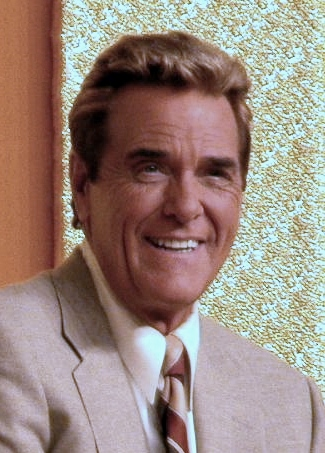
Chuck Woolery was the original host of the daytime version of Wheel of Fortune, holding this position from 1975 to 1981

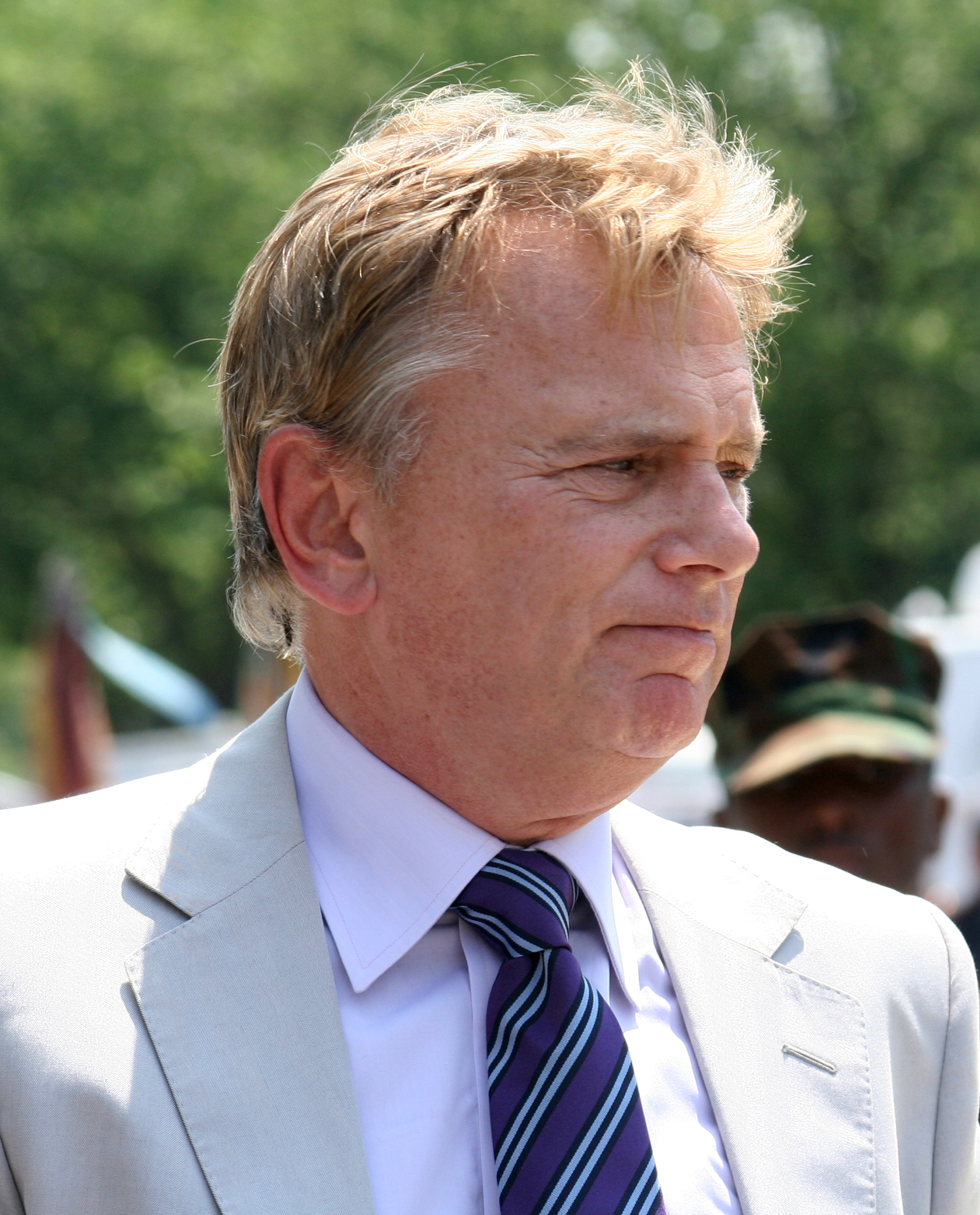
Pat Sajak hosted the daytime version from 1981 to 1989 and the nighttime version of the show from 1983 to 2024, and hosted the celebrity spin-off from 2021 to 2025

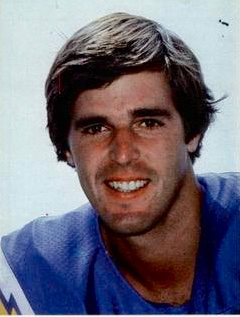
Rolf Benirschke took over hosting duties on the daytime version in January 1989

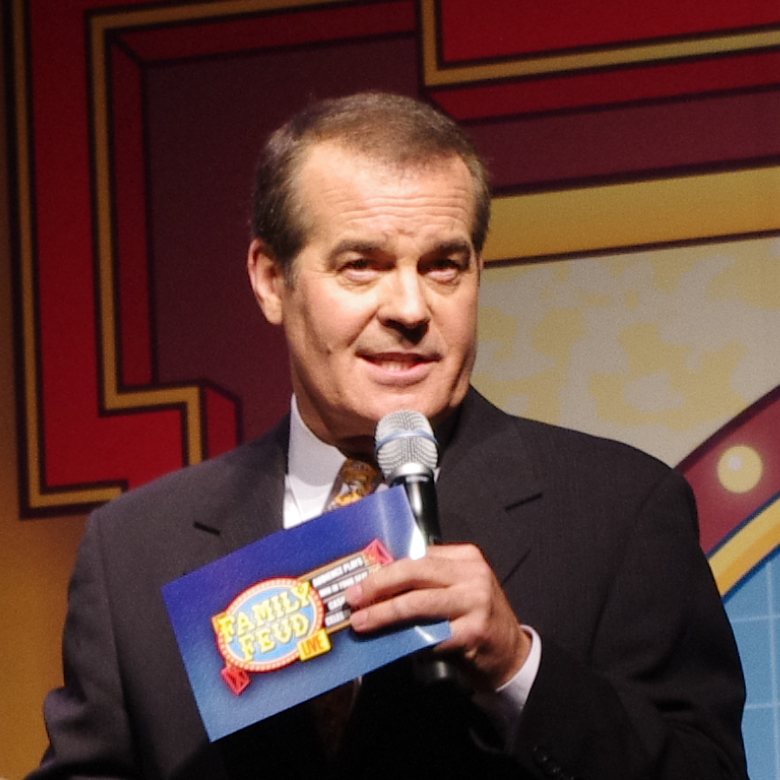
Bob Goen hosted the daytime version from mid-1989 until its cancellation in 1991

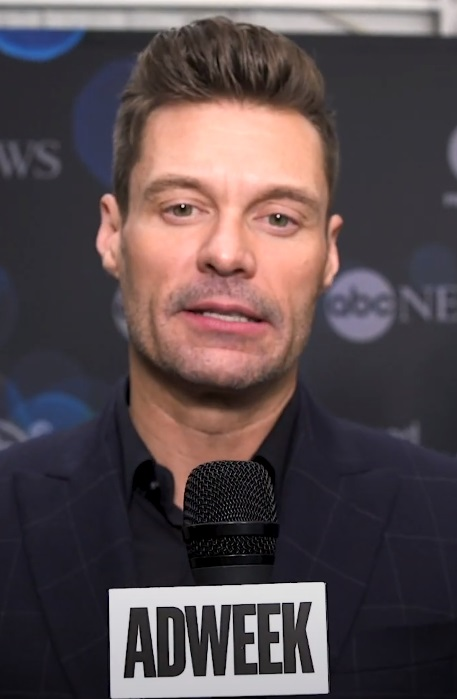
Ryan Seacrest replaced Pat Sajak as the host of Wheel of Fortune beginning with its 42nd syndicated season in 2024 and hosts the celebrity spin-off from 2025 to present

The original host of Wheel of Fortune was Chuck Woolery, who hosted the series from its 1975 premiere until December 25, 1981, save for one week in August 1980 when Alex Trebek hosted in his place. Woolery's departure came over a salary dispute with show creator Merv Griffin, and his contract was not renewed. On December 28, 1981, Pat Sajak made his debut as the host of Wheel. Griffin said that he chose Sajak for his "odd" sense of humor. NBC president and CEO Fred Silverman objected as he felt Sajak, who at the time of his hiring was the weather forecaster for KNBC, was "too local" for a national audience. Griffin countered by telling Silverman he would stop production if Sajak was not allowed to become host, and Silverman acquiesced.

Sajak hosted the daytime series until January 9, 1989, when he left to host a late-night talk show for CBS. The show's producers auditioned a number of potential successors upon his departure. These potential replacements included Michael Reagan, John Davidson, Bert Convy, and Tim Brando. Eventually, in December 1988, it was announced that Rolf Benirschke, a former placekicker in the National Football League, was chosen as Sajak's replacement. Benirschke hosted the program from a little more than five months, as his term as host came to an end due to NBC's cancellation of the daytime Wheel after fourteen years, with its final episode airing on June 30, 1989. When the newly formatted daytime series returned on CBS on July 17, 1989, Bob Goen became its host. The daytime program continued for a year and a half on CBS, then returned to NBC on January 14, 1991, and continued until September 20, 1991, when it was cancelled for a second and final time.

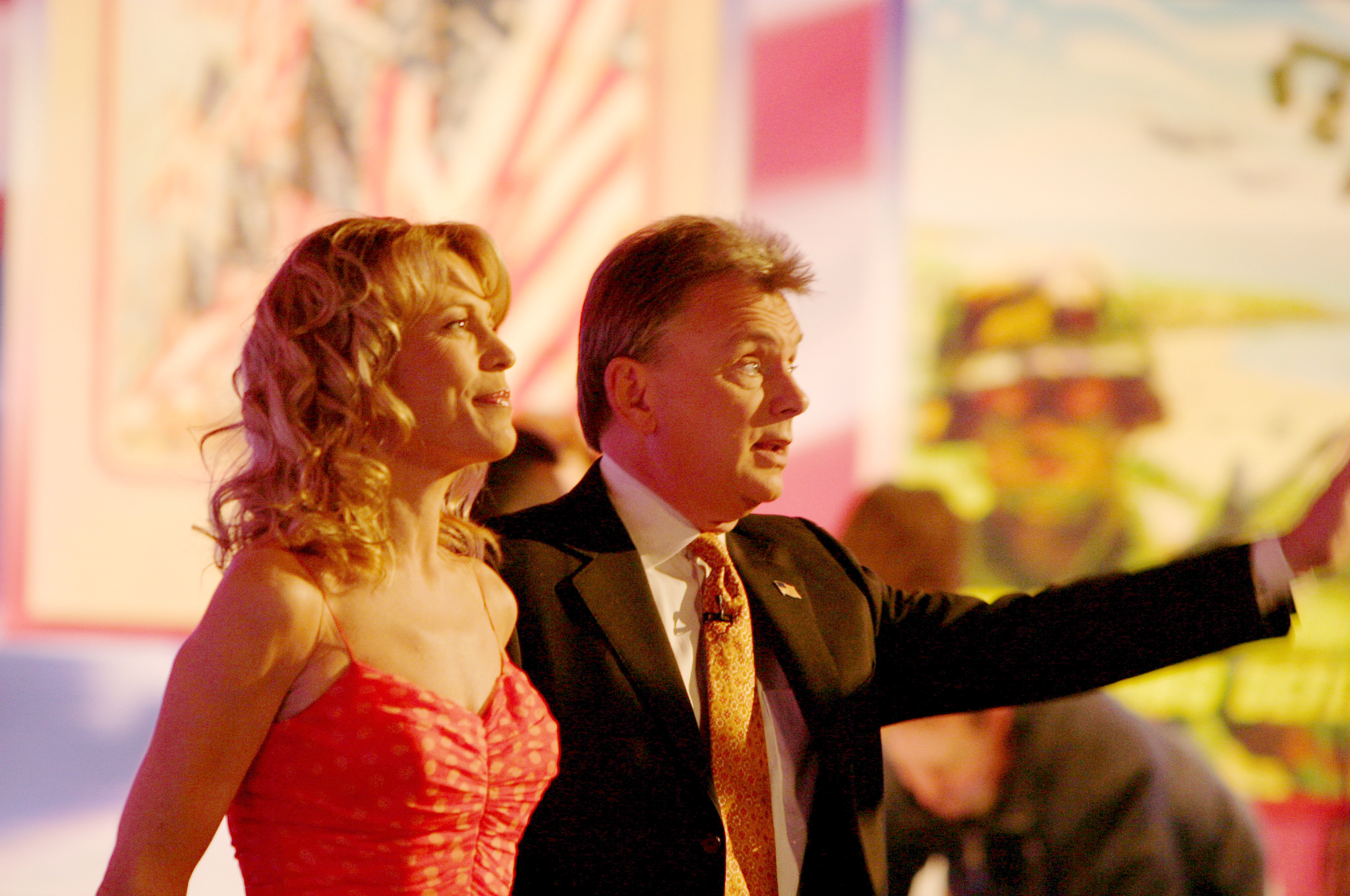
Vanna White (left, with Pat Sajak at right) has been the show's co-host since 1982.

Susan Stafford was the original co-host, serving in that role from the premiere until October 1982. Stafford was absent for two extended periods, once in 1977 after fracturing two vertebrae in her back and once in 1979 after an automobile accident. During these two extended absences, former Miss USA Summer Bartholomew was Stafford's most frequent substitute, with model Cynthia Washington and comedian Arte Johnson also filling in for Stafford.

After Stafford left to become a humanitarian worker, over two hundred applicants signed up for a nationwide search to be her replacement. Griffin eventually narrowed the list to three finalists, which consisted of Summer Bartholomew, former Playboy centerfold Vicki McCarty, and Vanna White. Griffin gave each of the three women an opportunity to win the job by putting them in a rotation for several weeks after Stafford's departure. In December 1982, Griffin named White as Stafford's successor, saying that he felt she was capable of activating the puzzle board letters (which is the primary role of the Wheel co-host) better than anyone else who had auditioned. White became highly popular among the young female demographic, and also gained a fanbase of adults interested in her daily wardrobe, in a phenomenon that has been referred to as "Vannamania". White also hosted the daytime version until its cancellation in 1991, except for one week in June 1986 when Stafford returned so that White could recover after her fiancé, John Gibson, died in a plane crash.

Sajak and White were host and co-host of the syndicated version until 2024, with a small number of exceptions. During two weeks in January 1991, Tricia Gist, the girlfriend and future wife of Griffin's son Tony, filled in for White when she and her new husband, restaurateur George San Pietro, were honeymooning. Gist returned for the week of episodes airing March 11 through 15, 1991, because White had a cold at the time of taping. On an episode in November 1996, when Sajak proved unable to host the bonus round segment because of laryngitis, he and White traded places for that segment. On the March 4, 1997 episode, Rosie O'Donnell co-hosted the third round with White after O'Donnell's name was used in a puzzle.

On April 1, 1997, Sajak and Alex Trebek traded jobs for the day. Sajak hosted that day's edition of Jeopardy! in place of Trebek. Trebek presided over a special two-contestant Wheel celebrity match between Sajak and White, who were playing for the Boy Scouts of America and the American Cancer Society, respectively. Lesly Sajak, Pat's wife, was the guest co-host for the day. In January and February 2011, the show held a "Vanna for a Day" contest in which home viewers submitted video auditions to take White's place for one episode, with the winner determined by a poll on the show's website. The winner of this contest, Katie Cantrell of Wooster, Ohio (a student at the Savannah College of Art and Design), took White's place for the second and third rounds on the episode that aired March 24, 2011.

In November 2019, three weeks of episodes were taped with White hosting in Sajak's place while he recovered from intestinal surgery. While White hosted, several guests appeared at the puzzle board, including costumed performers of Mickey and Minnie Mouse, and Pat Sajak's daughter, Maggie Sajak, who later appeared on Celebrity Wheel of Fortune on May 10, 2023, due to White as a celebrity contestant, playing for the St. Jude Children’s Research Hospital, with Jeopardy! hosts, Ken Jennings and Mayim Bialik, as her opponents. Maggie joined the show as a special correspondent, making appearances similar to the "Clue Crew" on companion program Jeopardy!, in September 2021.

On June 12, 2023, Sajak announced he would be leaving Wheel at the end of the 41st season. A few weeks later, Ryan Seacrest was announced to be the new host, starting in September 2024. Seacrest further stated that he looked forward to working alongside White. On September 19, 2023, Sony announced that White had extended her contract for additional two years to continue as co-host through the 2025–26 season. White was absent from the week of episodes airing October 2 through 6 due to her testing positive for COVID-19; taking her place for these episodes was schoolteacher Bridgette Donald-Blue, who was named Teacher of the Year for 2023 by the California Teachers Association. Sajak's final syndicated episode aired on June 7, 2024. It was announced on July 11, 2024, that because of American Idol auditions likely to occur that would take up Ryan Seacrest's time, Sajak would host the fifth celebrity season on ABC. Sajak's final episode as host of the celebrity edition aired on June 10, 2025.

=== Announcers ===
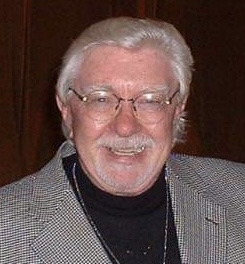
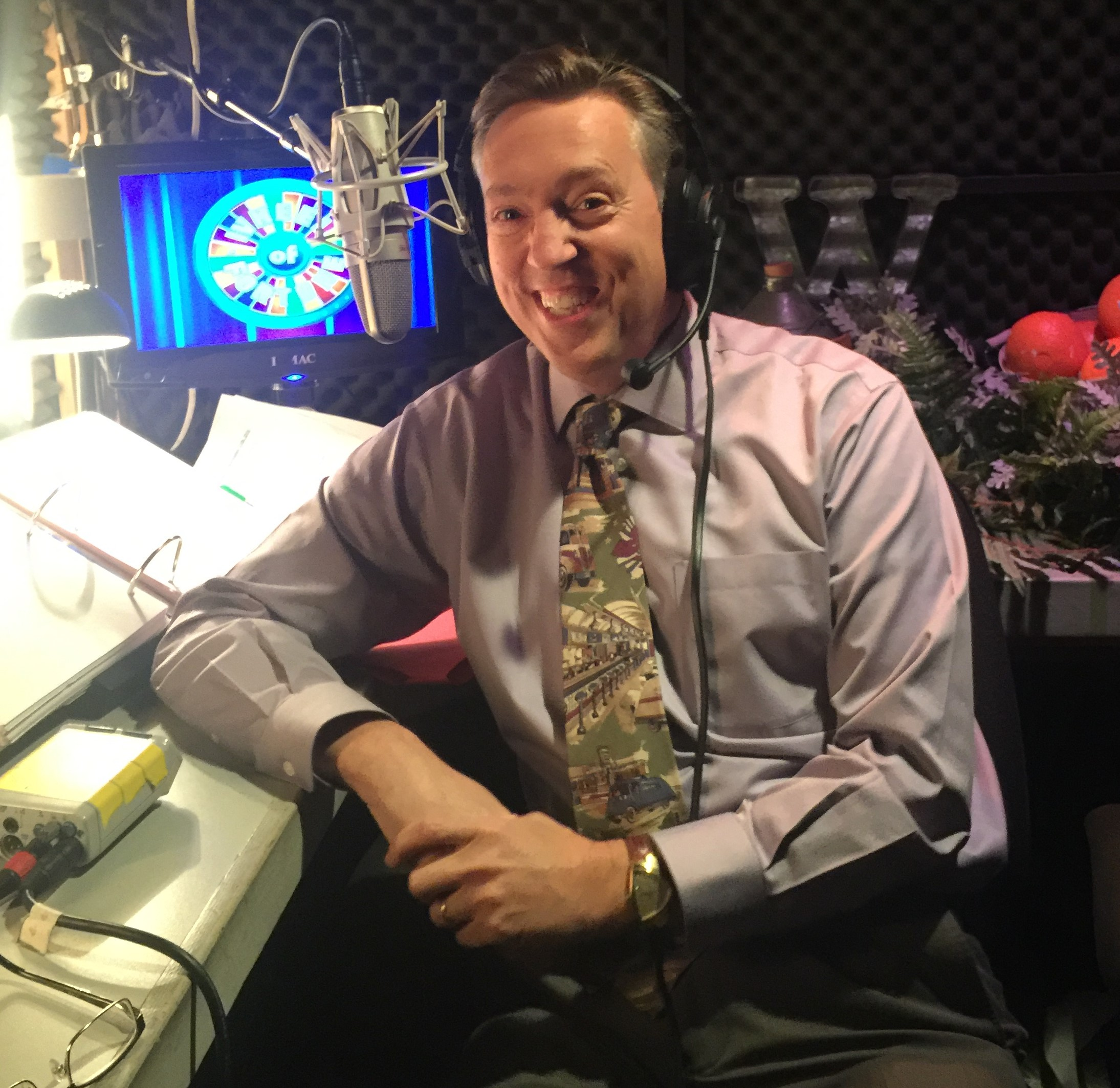
Charlie O'Donnell (left) was the show's longest-tenured announcer, holding this position from 1975 to 1980 and again from 1988 until his 2010 death. He was succeeded by Jim Thornton (right) in 2011, who served until being fired in 2026.

Charlie O'Donnell was the program's first and longest tenured announcer. In 1980, NBC was discussing cancelling Wheel and O'Donnell agreed to take the position as announcer on The Toni Tennille Show. The network decided against the cancellation but O'Donnell decided to honor his commitment and left the series. His replacement was Jack Clark, who added the syndicated series to his responsibilities when it premiered in 1983 and announced for both series until his death in July 1988. Los Angeles radio personality M. G. Kelly was Clark's replacement, starting on the daytime series in August 1988 and on the syndicated series a month later. Kelly held these positions until O'Donnell was able to return to the announcer position, doing so after his duties with Barris Industries came to an end at the end in 1989. O'Donnell remained with the series until shortly before his death in November 2010. Don Pardo, Don Morrow, and Johnny Gilbert have occasionally served as substitute announcers.

After O'Donnell's death, the producers sought a permanent replacement, and a series of substitutes announced, including Gilbert, John Cramer, Joe Cipriano, Rich Fields, Lora Cain, and Jim Thornton. In 2011, Thornton was chosen to be the show's fourth announcer. In season 39, Thornton appeared on-camera at the start of every episode. On September 4, 2026, Thornton was fired from the show amid pedophilia allegations stemming from a commercial flight that had occurred earlier in the year. The role is set to be recast, and he was edited out of episodes he had taped in Season 44. Brittany Sims of TV Insider reported that the season premiere week featured a substitute announcer who was uncredited, leading to fan speculation that the voice was either that of Jimmy McGuire (the show's stage manager, and a former member of the Jeopardy! Clue Crew), or that it was generated through artificial intelligence. Sims later stated that the substitute announcer was "believed to be" Marc Elmer.

=== Production staff ===
Wheel of Fortune typically employs a total of 100 in-house production personnel, with 60 to 100 local staff joining them for those episodes that are taped on location. Griffin was the executive producer of the network version throughout its entire run, and served as the syndicated version's executive producer until his retirement in 2000. Harry Friedman took over the role after Griffin retired, having earlier served as a producer starting in 1995.

On August 1, 2019, Sony Pictures Television announced that Friedman would retire as executive producer of both Wheel and Jeopardy! at the end of the 2019–20 season. On August 29, 2019, Sony Pictures Television announced that Mike Richards would replace Friedman at the start of 2020–21 season. Following Richards' earlier resignation as permanent host of Jeopardy!, he was fired on August 31, 2021, from his executive producer position at both Jeopardy! and Wheel. A Sony memo indicated that Michael Davies from Embassy Row would serve as interim executive producer of both Wheel and Jeopardy!; however, Davies was not credited on any episodes of Wheel, and Deadline subsequently reported that supervising producer Steve Schwartz oversaw the balance of the show's 39th season. Sajak was named a consulting producer in September 2021. On March 23, 2022, Bellamie Blackstone was announced to be a permanent executive producer for Wheel, with Schwartz getting promoted to co-executive producer.

John Rhinehart was the program's first producer, but departed in August 1976 to become NBC's West Coast Daytime Program Development Director. Afterwards, his co-producer, Nancy Jones, was promoted to sole producer, and served as such until 1995, when Friedman succeeded her. In 1997, Karen Griffith and Steve Schwartz joined Friedman as producers. They were later promoted to supervising producers, with Amanda Stern occupying Griffith's and Schwartz's former position.

The show's original director was Jeff Goldstein, who was succeeded by Dick Carson (a brother of Johnny Carson) in 1978. Mark Corwin, who had served as associate director under Carson, took over for him upon his retirement at the end of the 1998–99 season, and served as such until he himself died in July 2013 (although episodes already taped before his death continued airing until late 2013). Jeopardy! director Kevin McCarthy, Corwin's associate director Bob Cisneros, and Wheel and Jeopardy! technical director Robert Ennis filled in at various points, until Cisneros became full-time director in November 2013. Ennis returned as guest director for the weeks airing October 13–17 and November 17–21, 2014, as Cisneros was recovering from neck surgery at the time of taping. On September 14, 2015, Ennis was promoted to full-time director. Ennis retired at the end of the 2022–23 season and was replaced by Alex Van Wagner.

== Production ==
Wheel of Fortune is owned by Sony Pictures (previously known as Columbia TriStar Television, (Note: As Columbia TriStar Domestic Television from 2001 to 2002.) the successor company to original producer Merv Griffin Enterprises). The production company and copyright holder of all episodes to date is Califon Productions, Inc., which like SPT has Sony Pictures for its active registered agent, and whose name comes from a New Jersey town where Griffin once owned a farm. The rights to distribute the show worldwide were owned by CBS Media Ventures from its absorption of original distributor King World Productions in 2007, until sister company CBS Broadcasting temporarily took over distribution rights in 2024, but later reverted to CBS Media Ventures in 2025. Sony terminated CBS' distribution rights in 2025 due to a lawsuit claiming that CBS was engaging in preferential treatment of its wholly owned programming that prevented it from meeting its obligations to maximize the value of the Griffin game show on the syndicated market; starting on February 10, 2025, SPT now distributes the program itself. CBS Broadcasting, followed by CBS Media Ventures, will continue to distribute the show following the termination.

Wheel of Fortune was originally taped at NBC Studios in Burbank. The first fourteen years of the daytime series, as well as the first six of the syndicated series, were taped in Studio 4.

At the conclusion of the 1988–89 television season, which saw NBC drop the daytime series from its lineup, Wheel left Burbank and production moved to CBS Television City in Los Angeles. Both the nightly series and a relaunched daytime series taped in Studio 33 upon the move. The daytime series remained in production until 1991, by which point it had returned to NBC, while continuing to tape at Television City, the syndicated series remained there until 1995. After that, the show moved to its current home at Sony Pictures Studios in Culver City, where it occupies Stage 11. Some episodes are also recorded on location, a tradition which began with two weeks of episodes taped at Radio City Music Hall in late 1988. Recording sessions usually last for five or six episodes in one day.

=== Set ===
A screen shot of the show's puzzle board from a 2026 episode

Various changes have been made to the basic set since the syndicated version's premiere in 1983. In 1997, a large video display was added center stage, which was then upgraded in 2003 as the show began the transition into high-definition broadcasting. In the mid-1990s, the show began a long-standing tradition of nearly every week coming with its own unique theme (such as a holiday or other concept), with associated decorations on the set.

The most recent set design introduced during season 42 in 2024 was conceived by production designers J.P. Connelly and Renee Hoss-Johnson, coinciding with the debut of Ryan Seacrest as host. It was designed to feature nods to past eras of the show and Merv Griffin's original concept of a "grand" atmosphere, using an Art Nouveau-influenced style including gold-tinted circles and spokes evoking the wheel itself (including a new puzzle board backdrop inspired by an earlier "wagon wheel" design), and a new video wall that can now slide open for the host's entrance.

Shopper's Bazaar used a vertically mounted wheel which was often difficult to see on-screen. Ed Flesh, who also designed the sets for The $25,000 Pyramid and Jeopardy!, redesigned the wheel mechanism, in which the wheel lays flat while a camera zooms in from above. The first incarnation of the wheel was mostly made of paint and cardboard, and has since seen multiple design changes. Until the mid-1990s, the wheel spun automatically during the opening and closing of the show. The current incarnation, in use since 2003, is framed on a steel tube surrounded by Plexiglas panels and contains more than 200 lighting instruments. It is held by a stainless steel shaft with roller bearings. Altogether, the wheel weighs approximately 2,400 pounds (1,100 kg). The wheel, including its light extensions, is 16.5 ft (5.0 m) in diameter.

The show's original puzzle board had three rows of thirteen manually operated trilons, for a total of 39 spaces. On December 21, 1981, a larger board with 48 trilons in four rows (11, 13, 13, and 11 trilons) was adopted. This board was surrounded by a double-arched border of lights which flashed at the beginning and end of the round. Each trilon had three sides: a green side to represent spaces not used by the puzzle, a blank side to indicate a letter that had not been revealed, and a side with a letter on it. While the viewer saw a seamless transition to the next puzzle, with these older boards in segments where more than one puzzle was present, a stop-down of taping took place during which the board was wheeled offstage and the new puzzle loaded in by hand out of sight of the contestants. On February 24, 1997, the show introduced a computerized puzzle board composed of 52 touch-activated monitors in four rows (twelve on the top and bottom rows and fourteen each on the middle rows). During regular gameplay, when a contestant chose a letter that is in the puzzle, the monitors at those positions became illuminated and the hostess touched the right edge of each one to reveal the letter. The puzzle board was refurbished for season 40 in 2022, replacing the individual monitors for each letter with a singular video board, and using lidar sensors for touch input.

Although not typically seen by viewers, the set also includes a used letter board that shows contestants which letters are remaining in play, a scoreboard that is visible from the contestants' perspective, and a countdown clock. The used letter board is also used during the bonus round, and in at least one case, helped the contestant to see unused letters to solve a difficult puzzle.

==== COVID-19 accommodations ====
In March 2020, Sony suspended production of the show due to the COVID-19 pandemic. In August 2020, taping resumed with new safety measures. These new episodes began airing September 14, 2020. When production began again after shutting down, new episodes taped without studio audiences with only essential staff and crew allowed onstage.

At tapings during that time, personal protective equipment was provided to everyone off-camera and behind the scenes. All staff and crew underwent testing on a regular basis, while contestants were tested before they stepped onto the set. Additionally, social distancing measures were enforced both on the set and offstage, and Sajak's and the players' podiums were widened to allow for greater physical distance between contestants during gameplay. Contestants spun the wheel with a white flat bicycle handlebar grip to fit over the wheel's pegs so they did not have to touch the wheel directly, and no longer handed lost prizes back to the host, instead placing them in a receptacle behind their podium.

In July 2022, the show's producers announced that live studios in-person audiences would return for season 40. At the start of season 40, most other COVID era protocols had also been lifted, with the contestants standing closer together, no longer using the grips to spin the wheel, and Sajak, later Seacrest, walking up and down the podium to shake hands/hug contestants at the end of the game.

=== Music ===
Alan Thicke composed the show's original theme, which was titled "Big Wheels". In 1983, it was replaced by Griffin's own composition, "Changing Keys", to allow him to derive royalties from that composition's use on both the network and syndicated versions. Steve Kaplan became music director starting in 1997, and served as such until killed in a plane crash in 2003. His initial theme was a remix of "Changing Keys", but by 2000, he replaced it with a composition of his own, which was titled "Happy Wheels". Since 2006, music direction has been handled by Frankie Blue and John Hoke. Themes they have written for the show include a remix of "Happy Wheels" and an original rock-based composition. A rearranged version of "Changing Keys" composed by Hoke and performed by Bleeding Fingers Music has been used as the main theme music starting in 2021.

In addition to "Changing Keys", Griffin also composed various incidental music cues for the syndicated version which were used for announcements of prizes in the show's early years. Among them were "Frisco Disco" (earlier the closing theme for a revival of Jeopardy! which aired in 1978 and 1979), "A Time for Tony" (whose basic melody evolved into "Think!", the longtime theme song for Jeopardy!), "Buzzword" (later used as the theme for Merv Griffin's Crosswords), "Nightwalk", "Struttin' on Sunset", and an untitled vacation cue.

=== Audition process ===
The most recent design of the Wheelmobile at the Jackson Rancheria Casino Resort near Jackson, California

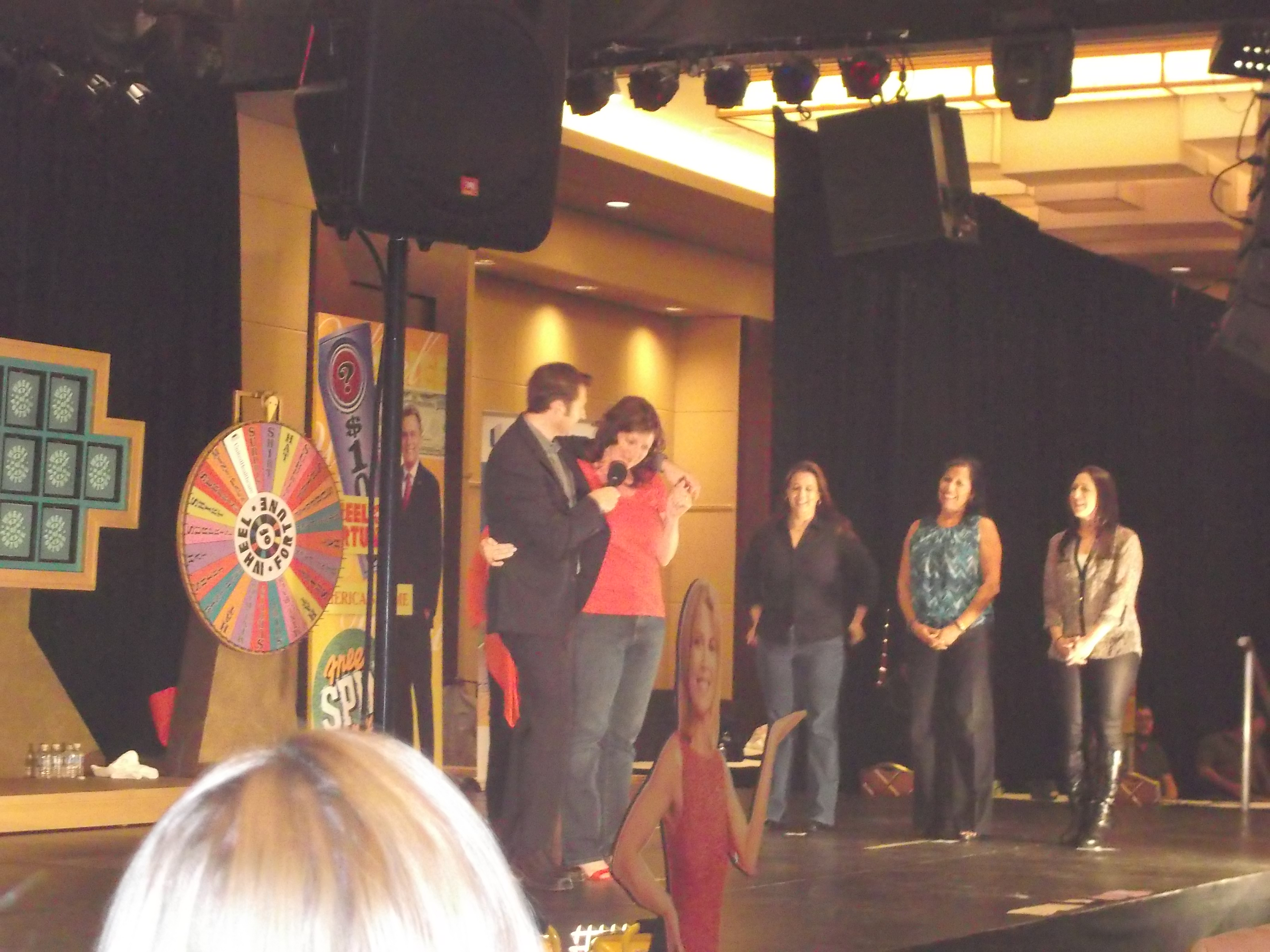
Marty Lublin interviews a potential contestant during an audition at Morongo Casino, Resort & Spa, Cabazon, California.

Anyone at least 18 years old has the potential to become a contestant through Wheel of Fortune's audition process. Exceptions include employees and immediate family members of Paramount Skydance, Sony Pictures Entertainment, or any of their respective affiliates or subsidiaries; any firm involved in supplying prizes for the show; and television stations that broadcast Wheel and/or Jeopardy!, their sister radio stations or newspapers (if any), and those advertising agencies that are affiliated with them. Also ineligible to apply as contestants are individuals who have appeared on a different game show within the previous year, three other game shows within the past ten years, or on any version of Wheel of Fortune itself, including the 1997–98 children's version, Wheel 2000.

Throughout the year, the show uses a custom-designed Winnebago recreational vehicle called the "Wheelmobile" to travel across the United States, holding open auditions at various public venues. Participants are provided with entry forms which are then drawn randomly. Individuals whose names are drawn appear on stage, five at a time, and are interviewed by traveling host Marty Lublin. The group of five then plays a mock version of the speed-up round, and five more names are selected after a puzzle is solved. Everyone who is called onstage receives a themed prize, usually determined by the spin of a miniature wheel. Auditions typically last two days, with three one-hour segments per day. After each Wheelmobile event, the "most promising candidates" are invited back to the city in which the first audition was held, to participate in a second audition. Alternatively, a participant may submit an audition form with a self-shot video through the show's website to enter an audition. Contestants not appearing on stage at Wheelmobile events have their applications retained and get drawn at random to fill second-level audition vacancies. At the second audition, potential contestants play more mock games featuring a miniature wheel and puzzle board, followed by a 16-puzzle test with some letters revealed. The contestants have five minutes to solve as many puzzles as they can by writing in the correct letters. The people who pass continue the audition, playing more mock games which are followed by interviews.

Since the show's hiatus due to COVID-19 ended, all auditions have been conducted online.

== Broadcast history ==
Wheel of Fortune premiered on January 6, 1975, at 10:30 am (9:30 Central) on NBC. Lin Bolen, then the head of daytime programming, purchased the show from Griffin to compensate him for canceling the original Jeopardy! series, which had one year remaining on its contract. Jeopardy! aired its final episode on the Friday before Wheel's premiere. The original Wheel aired on NBC, in varying time slots between 10:30 am and noon, until June 30, 1989. Throughout that version's run, episodes were generally 30 minutes in length, except for six weeks of shows aired between December 1975 and January 1976 which were 60 minutes in length. NBC announced the cancellation of the show in August 1980, but it stayed on the air following a decision to cut the duration of The David Letterman Show from 90 to 60 minutes. The network Wheel moved to CBS on July 17, 1989, and remained there until January 11, 1991. After that, it briefly returned to NBC, replacing Let's Make a Deal, but was canceled permanently on September 20 of that year.

The daily syndicated nighttime version of Wheel premiered on September 19, 1983. From its debut, the syndicated version offered a larger prize budget than its network counterpart. The show came from humble beginnings: King World chairmen Roger, Michael, and Robert King could initially find only fifty stations that were willing to carry the show, and since they could not find affiliates for the syndicated Wheel in New York, Los Angeles, or Chicago, Philadelphia was the largest market in which the show could succeed in its early days. Only nine stations carried the show from its beginning, but by midseason it was airing on all 50 of the stations that were initially willing to carry it, and by the beginning of 1984 the show was available to 99 percent of television households. Soon, Wheel succeeded Family Feud as the highest-rated syndicated show, and at the beginning of the 1984–85 season, Griffin followed up on the show's success by launching a syndicated revival of Jeopardy!, hosted by Alex Trebek. The syndicated success of Wheel and Jeopardy! siphoned ratings from the period's three longest-running and most popular game shows, Tic-Tac-Dough, The Joker's Wild, and Family Feud, to the point that all three series came to an end by the fall of 1986. At this point, Wheel had the highest ratings of any syndicated television series in history, and at the peak of the show's popularity, over 40 million people were watching five nights per week. The series, along with companion series Jeopardy!, remained the most-watched syndicated program in the United States until dethroned by Judge Judy in 2011. The program has become America's longest-running syndicated game show and its second-longest in either network or syndication, second to the version of The Price Is Right which began airing in 1972. In 1992, the show began airing on most of the owned-and-operated stations for ABC, currently known as the ABC Owned Television Stations. By the end of 2012, the syndicated Wheel had been recognized by over 90 million Americans, and had awarded a total of over $200 million in cash and prizes to contestants. In most TV markets, Wheel airs on the same station as Jeopardy! with many affiliates airing the two shows back-to-back. Like Jeopardy!, Wheel airs internationally on the American Forces Network and Canada's Yes TV, NTV, and CHEK-DT. Starting with the 43rd season, the show became available on Hulu, which was also available on Disney+ through the Hulu hub, and Peacock in the United States and Crave in Canada, with the five most recent episodes being available, all of which are available the next day after its airing, as well as select classic episodes that are always available.

The popularity of Wheel of Fortune has led it to become a worldwide franchise, with over forty known adaptations in international markets outside the United States. Versions of the show have existed in such countries as Australia, Brazil, Czech Republic, Denmark, France, Germany, Italy, Malaysia, New Zealand, the Philippines, Poland, Russia, Spain, the United Kingdom, and Vietnam. The American version of Wheel has honored its international variants with an occasional theme of special weeks known as "Wheel Around the World", the inaugural episode of which aired when the 23rd syndicated season premiered on September 12, 2005.

Between September 1997 and January 1998, CBS and Game Show Network concurrently aired a special children's version of the show titled Wheel 2000. It was hosted by David Sidoni, with Tanika Ray providing voice and motion capture for a CGI hostess named "Cyber Lucy". Created by Scott Sternberg, the spin-off featured special gameplay in which numerous rules were changed. For example, the show's child contestants competed for points and prizes instead of cash, with the eventual winner playing for a grand prize in the bonus round.

== Celebrity Wheel of Fortune ==
Celebrity Wheel of Fortune
- Genre: Game show
- Based on: Wheel of Fortune by Merv Griffin
- Directed by: Robert Ennis; Alex Van Wagner
- Presented by: Pat Sajak; Vanna White; Ryan Seacrest
- Announcer: Jim Thornton
- Theme music composer: Merv Griffin; John Hoke; Bleeding Fingers Music
- Ending theme: "Changing Keys"
- Country of origin: United States
- Original language: English
- No. of seasons: 7
- No. of episodes: 80

Production
- Executive producers: Mike Richards (2021); Bellamie Blackstone; Genna Gintzig
- Production location: Sony Pictures Studios Stage 11, Culver City, California
- Running time: approx. 45 minutes
- Production company: Sony Pictures (Note: As Sony Pictures Television Studios in seasons 1 to 3, and Sony Pictures Television in seasons 4 to 6, as well as certain episodes of season 7)

Original release
- Network: ABC
- Release: January 7, 2021 – present
- Network: Disney+ / Hulu
- Release: June 12, 2026 – present

Related
- Wheel of Fortune; Wheel 2000

In November 2020, ABC ordered a prime time spin-off show, Celebrity Wheel of Fortune, with Sajak and White as hosts and initially with Richards as executive producer, which premiered on January 7, 2021. Each hour-long episode consists of two complete games; in addition to toss-ups (with triple toss-ups now worth $5,000, for a total of $15,000, while the seventh season replaces the $1,000 and $2,000 toss-ups with the "Fortune Frenzy" round) and the bonus round, the first game has three regular rounds, while the second has at least three regular rounds, with the last round being a speed-up round. Scores are reset between games, and celebrities' charities are guaranteed a minimum of $30,000 for the hour.

Game play proceeds as in regular games with three notable changes. First, a bonus cash prize is awarded in every regular round: $5,000 in Round 1, $10,000 in Round 2, and $20,000 in Round 3 (and subsequent rounds in the second game). Second, starting from the second round of each game, there are four Million Dollar Wedges that occupy a full space (on the regular version, a single wedge occupies the central third of a space with the other two thirds as Bankrupt spaces); if a player lands on one when they already hold one, it counts as a $1,000 space. Third, the bonus round features four $100,000 envelopes, but a minimum of $25,000; a Million Dollar Wedge replaces one of the four $100,000 envelopes with a $1,000,000 one. Original airings of the show feature giveaways to home viewers in certain rounds, most notably $10,000 in the second round of each game in the first four seasons and a vacation package (or $10,000 on certain episodes in the fifth and seventh seasons) in the third round of the first game starting in the third season.

In May 2021, ABC renewed Celebrity Wheel of Fortune for a second season, which premiered on September 26, 2021. In May 2022, ABC renewed Celebrity Wheel of Fortune for a third season, which premiered on September 25, 2022. In May 2023, ABC renewed Celebrity Wheel of Fortune for a fourth season, which premiered on September 27, 2023 by which point Blackstone had taken over as executive producer. In July 2023, White had signed a new deal to return as hostess of the show. In May 2024, ABC renewed the series for a fifth season, which was originally supposed to premiere on October 14, 2024, but after ABC announced more Monday Night Football games, the show was shelved and ABC announced that the new season would air in 2025. A Christmas episode premiered on December 2, 2024, with Sajak returning for one final season following his retirement from hosting the regular version back in June of the same year. The remaining episodes of the season began airing on April 30, 2025, with Sajak's final episode as host airing on June 10.

In May 2025, ABC renewed Celebrity Wheel of Fortune for a sixth season, with Seacrest taking over as host. It premiered on September 26, 2025. On November 28, 2025, it was announced that the sixth season would continue on January 9, 2026, with the remaining two episodes of the season's first half. In May 2026, Celebrity Wheel of Fortune was renewed for a seventh season on ABC, which removed the announcer role, due to Jim Thornton being fired, which premiered on October 2, 2026. The second half of season 6 began streaming on Disney+ and Hulu, with all episodes being available on June 12, 2026 and started airing on ABC on Wednesday nights starting November 4, 2026, albeit without Thornton, with Season 7 continuing to air on Fridays.

== Reception ==
The success of Wheel of Fortune itself is somewhat of a mystery. Everyone knows that it's a colossal hit, but no one is quite sure why ... I once asked [Merv Griffin] why he thought Wheel of Fortune was such a big success, and his reply was, "I could give you an answer, but I honestly have no idea." ... When I queried Sajak about the appeal of Wheel of Fortune, his cryptic answer was: "We're not doing MacBeth."

— Bob Greene, 1986

Wheel of Fortune has long been one of the highest-rated programs on American syndicated television. It was the highest-rated show in all of syndication before it was dethroned by Two and a Half Men in 2010. The syndicated Wheel shared the Daytime Emmy Award for Outstanding Game Show with Jeopardy! in 2011, and Sajak won three Daytime Emmys for Outstanding Game Show Host – in 1993, 1997, and 1998. In a 2001 issue, TV Guide ranked Wheel number 25 among the 50 Greatest Game Shows of All Time, and in 2013, the magazine ranked it number two in its list of the 60 greatest game shows ever, second only to Jeopardy! In August 2006, the show was ranked number six on GSN's list of the 50 Greatest Game Shows.

Wheel was the subject of many nominations in GSN's Game Show Awards special, which aired on June 6, 2009. The show was nominated for Best Game Show, but lost to Are You Smarter than a 5th Grader?. Sajak and White were nominated for Best Game Show Host, but lost to Deal or No Deal's Howie Mandel; and O'Donnell was considered for Best Announcer but lost to Rich Fields from The Price Is Right (Fields later was a Wheel substitute announcer after O'Donnell's death). One of the catchphrases uttered by contestants, "I'd like to buy a vowel", was considered for Favorite Game Show Catch Phrase, but lost to "Come on down!", the announcer's catchphrase welcoming new contestants to Price. The sound effect heard at the start of a new regular gameplay round won the award for Favorite Game Show Sound Effect. The sound heard when the wheel lands on Bankrupt, known as the "slide whistle", was also nominated. Despite having been retired from the show for nearly a decade by that point, "Changing Keys" was nominated for Best Game Show Theme Song. However, it lost to its fellow Griffin composition, "Think!" from Jeopardy!

A hall of fame honoring Wheel of Fortune is part of the Sony Pictures Studios tour, and was introduced on the episode aired May 10, 2010. Located in the same stage as the show's taping facility, this hall of fame features memorabilia related to Wheel's syndicated history, including retired props, classic merchandise, photographs, videos, and a special case dedicated to White's wardrobe. Two years later, in 2012, the show was honored with a Ride of Fame on a double-decker tour bus in New York City.

== Merchandise ==
Numerous board games based on Wheel of Fortune have been released by different toy companies. The games are all similar, incorporating a wheel, puzzle display board, play money and various accessories like Free Spin tokens. Milton Bradley released the first board game in 1975. In addition to all the supplies mentioned above, the game included twenty prize cards to simulate the "shopping" prizes of the show, with prizes ranging in value from $100 to $3,000. Two editions were released, the only difference being the box art and the included books of puzzles. Other home versions were released by Pressman Toy Corporation, Tyco/Mattel, Parker Brothers, Endless Games, and Irwin Toys.

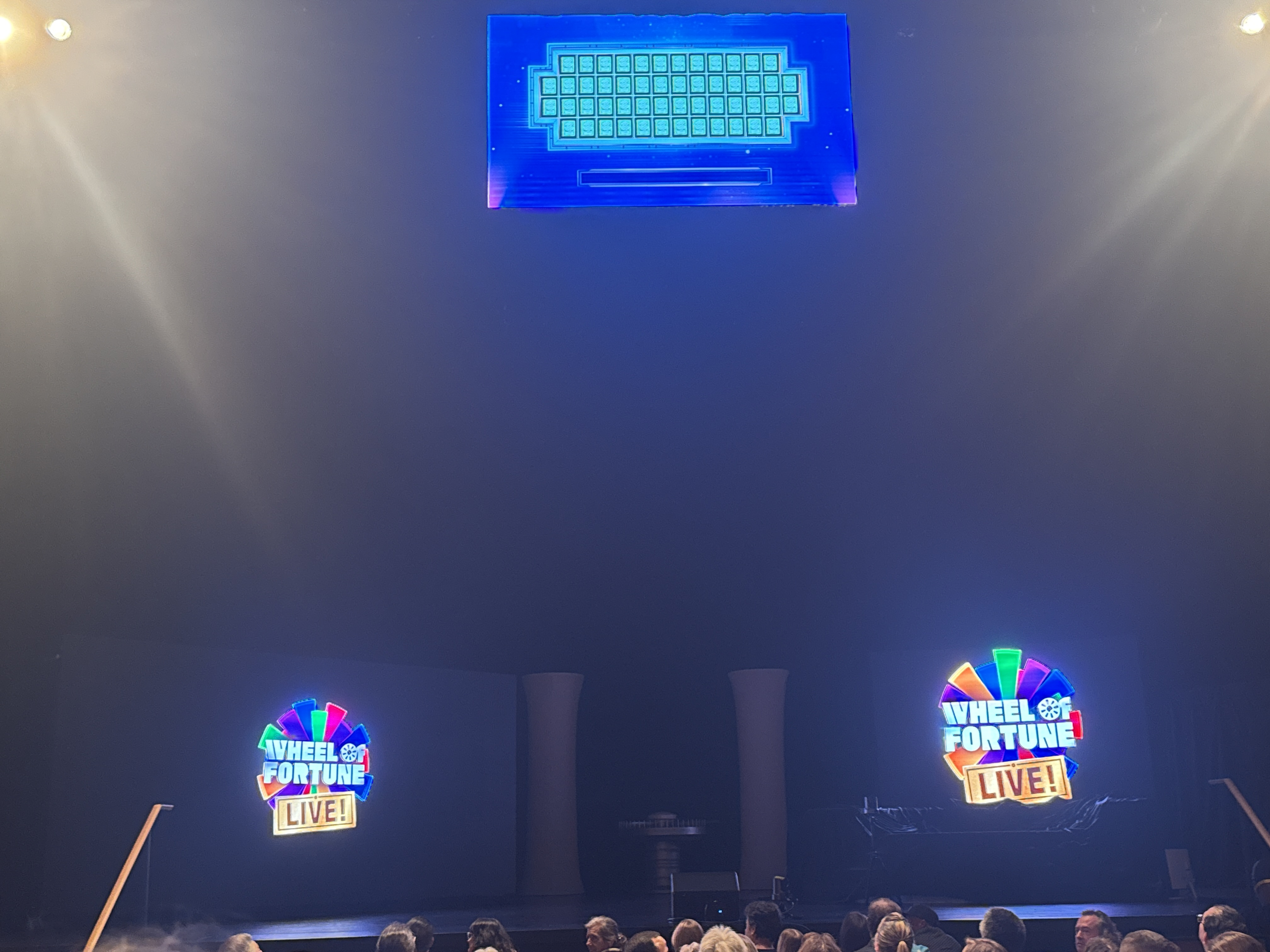
Wheel of Fortune Live! in Fort Lauderdale, Florida

Additionally, several video games based on the show have been released for personal computers, the Internet, and various gaming consoles spanning multiple hardware generations. Most games released in the 20th century were published by GameTek, which produced a dozen Wheel games on various platforms, starting with a Nintendo Entertainment System game released in 1987 and continuing until the company closed in 1998 after filing for Chapter 11 bankruptcy protection. Subsequent games were published by Hasbro Interactive and its acquirer Infogrames/Atari; Sony Online Entertainment, THQ and Ubisoft. A game for mobile devices titled Wheel of Fortune Daily, developed by Frosty Pop, was released for iOS, macOS and tvOS via Apple Arcade in 2024.

In 1996, gaming company International Game Technology (IGT) first licensed Wheel for a line of slot machines based on the show; it later became one of the company's longest-running and most popular lines of slot machines.

In May 2022, a touring staged production show, Wheel of Fortune Live!, was announced, with an initial run of over 60 dates from September to December 2022. The show is produced by Right Angle Entertainment in partnership with Sony and United Talent Agency. Similar to The Price Is Right Live!, the touring version features alternate hosts, which have included former daytime host Bob Goen, but not Sajak, Seacrest, or White.
