= Greg Weiner =

Greg Weiner is a professional photographer. He is well known for his erotic images of nude male models.

According to Weiner, he started his photography career as an assistant in New York City in the late 1980’s. And from there, he moved to Milan, Italy to pursue fashion, but quickly discovered that he did not enjoy that, and so concentrated on portraits and physique work.

He reveled that he began shooting for exercise magazines, which led to working for Playgirl and Playboy magazines, and had many corporate and entertainment clients.

== Biography ==
Weiner has been one of Playgirl's primary photographers since the early 1990s. Greg also shoots for Paragon Men, a monthly web-zine featuring "artistic male physique imagery and erotica." Among the male models he has shot nude are actor Joe Zaso, Anthony Catanzaro, Levi Johnston, actor and human rights activist Ben Patrick Johnson, and former Menudo Angelo Garcia.
