= Sepe (surname) =

Sepe is an Italian surname originating from the dialectal word sepe, meaning 'hedge, fence, enclosure'.

Notable people with the surname include:

- Angelo Sepe, (1941–1984) Italian-American gangster
- Crescenzio Sepe (born 1943), Italian cardinal
- Daniele Sepe (born 1960), Italian musician
- Frank Sepe (born 1971), American fitness author
- Luigi Sepe (born 1991), Italian footballer
- Majda Sepe, (1937–2006) Slovenian singer
- Michele Sepe (born 1986), Italian rugby player
- Mimmo Sepe (1955–2020), Italian comedian
