= John Gibson (actor, born 1948) =

American actor, dancer, centerfold (1948–1986)

- Born: July 15, 1948; Michigan, US
- Died: May 17, 1986 (aged 37); Los Angeles, California, US
- Occupations: Actor; model; dancer
- Years active: 1975–1986
- Partner: Vanna White (1981–1986)

John Gibson (July 15, 1948 – May 17, 1986) was an American actor, model, and dancer, known for The Warriors, The Young and the Restless, One Life to Live, and his national profile as a Chippendales dancer.

He was engaged to television personality Vanna White at the time of his death in a plane crash on May 17, 1986.

== Life and career ==
Born near Detroit in 1948, Gibson attended Northville High School, earned a degree from the University of Michigan, then married his girlfriend from college. Feeling constrained and listless working at his father's used car lot, Gibson left both the job and marriage, and following a year as a self-described "ski bum" in Aspen, Colorado, he moved to West Palm Beach, Florida, where he worked as a carpenter and waiter as he pursued a real estate license.

=== Modeling and Chippendales fame ===
While in Florida, Gibson sent photos of himself to the newly introduced Playgirl for consideration. The magazine flew him to California for a shoot and selected him to be the magazine's April 1975 centerfold, a move he credits with "[turning] my life around" and giving shape to a new career path, rooted in his looks and personality. Gibson moved to Los Angeles and began working as a model for catalogs and advertisements, and he had small roles in film and television.

Gibson came to international prominence in 1980 as one of the highest-profile members of the Chippendales. At the height of the group's fame, Gibson made talk show and personal appearances on behalf of the troupe, he appeared regularly in the press, and his name and likeness were featured on posters, calendars, board games, and other merchandise. In 1982, he was selected as the cover model for the troupe's annual calendar, embarking on another national press tour in support of it.

=== Acting ===
Shortly after arriving in Los Angeles, Gibson began taking acting classes, and in 1979, he was cast as one of the "baseball furies" in the film The Warriors. Gibson continued to act, primarily in television, appearing on Three's Company, Eight Is Enough, and CHiPS.

In December 1980, he started as Jerry 'Cash' Cashman on the daytime show The Young and the Restless, a role he played until March 1982. Cashman owned a gentleman's club on the show and occasionally performed himself, something the producers tailored to Gibson's background. In 1983, he returned to daytime television, playing Tom 'Hawk' Haney on One Life to Live and appearing on The Fall Guy. Gibson's final acting appearance before his death was in 1984's The Cartier Affair with David Hasselhoff and Joan Collins.

=== Engagement to Vanna White ===
Gibson's long relationship with, and engagement to, model and Wheel of Fortune hostess Vanna White made him a regular fixture in tabloids and celebrity journalism of the day.

This coverage led to intense media attention after his death, causing a grieving White, on a leave of absence from the show, to condemn tabloid publications for their intrusive and sensationalized coverage of the tragedy. White has since cited her relationship with Gibson, and the support she received from fans in the wake of his death, as a particularly formative time in her life and career, directly impacting her perspective on both.

=== Death ===
Gibson died in a plane crash on May 17, 1986 near Van Nuys Airport in Los Angeles. He was piloting a rented Socata Trinidad TB20 plane when it crashed and caught fire after hitting a curb on Roscoe Boulevard. Officials from the National Transportation Safety Board attributed the crash to turbulence, finding Gibson's plane struck the prop wash from a C-130 military transport plane that was landing ahead of him.

The crash, one of two fatal incidents near the airport that weekend, left Gibson's body so severely burned that identification required dental X-ray comparison.
