= Tim Boyce =

American model

- Born: Timothy Shane Boyce; July 9, 1968 (age 58); San Francisco, California, USA
- Occupation: Model
- Years active: 1993–present
- Modelling information
- Height: 1.94 m (6 ft 4 1/2 in)
- Hair colour: Brown
- Eye colour: Brown

Timothy Shane Boyce is an American fashion and fitness model regarded as a male supermodel of the 1990s.

Boyce has worked with photographers Peter Lindbergh and Bettina Rheims in advertising campaigns for high fashion designers such as Giorgio Armani, Gianfranco Ferre and brands such as Levi's. He appeared on the covers of Arena Homme + and L'Uomo Vogue alongside a new generation of top male models of the 1990s, including Marcus Schenkenberg and Tyson Beckford, who attained celebrity status in the global fashion, movie, music, and media markets.

In 1995, Out Magazine featured Boyce on its cover, photographed by Guy Aroch. The Out Magazine cover story lead the Los Angeles Times to single out Boyce and other notable figures such as Gore Vidal and Candace Gingrich as out leaders contributing to the increasingly vibrant market of the gay press that was notable for changing the landscape of mainstream media in the 1990s.

== Early life ==
Boyce was born in San Francisco, California of Italian and Irish ancestry. He moved to New York City, excelling in high school track and field, baseball and other sports before graduating from NYU with a degree in Communication Sciences in 1991.

== Career ==
In 1993, Boyce was photographed by Steven Meisel on the October issue of L’Uomo Vogue with a style team that included Garren and Lori Goldstein. Boyce continued working in the fashion editorial pages of such magazines as British GQ, Interview, New York Times Magazine, Arena, Vogue Hommes, Details, and Italian Vogue as well as on the runway in fashion shows for Calvin Klein, Giorgio Armani, Issey Miyake, Gianfranco Ferre, and Donna Karan.

In 1994, for the Autumn/Winter issue of Arena Homme +, a spin-off of the bi-monthly Arena, Boyce was photographed by master fashion photographer Albert Watson for the cover with four other top male models of the era, including Tyson Beckford and Marcus Schenkenberg. The two-page fold-out cover included the headline “High Five the New Supermodel Army - Tyson, Tim, Marcus, Gregg and Larry photographed by Albert Watson” and a quote by Boyce: “If I was a female supermodel I'd be Kate Moss – so I could be cute and tiny instead of big and ugly.” The magazine celebrated the five men, foretold their pop-cultural notoriety, and with Boyce's words quoted as a headline on the cover, signaled a skill that he would demonstrate later in life as a writer. The accompanying profile on Boyce stated that he had been modeling for just 18 months, was represented by Ford Models and Select Model Management, and included details on how he was discovered by fashion consultant Wayne Scot Lukas in New York where he attended NYU. Lukas asked Boyce to test for a Levi's commercial which launched his career. On the following pages, he is featured in ads for Gianfranco Ferre photographed by Bettina Rheims, Giorgio Armani Occhiali photographed by Peter Lindbergh, and in a fashion editorial photographed by Stephane Sednaoui with grooming by Michael Boadi.

For the September 1996 issue of Interview, Boyce conducted a one-on-one interview with rock singer Pat Benatar, discussing the origins and legacy of her MTV era rock and roll image. Boyce joined Molly Haskell who interviewed Jeanne Moreau, Danny Glover who interviewed Harry Belafonte, and Mark Marvel who interviewed Joan Didion as a contributing writer of the magazine.

=== Out Magazine Cover (1995) ===
In the midst of his career, Boyce was featured on the October 1995 cover of Out with the headline: “Gay Model - Hanging Out with Supermodel Tim Boyce.” The cover was accompanied by an article titled, “‘This Model's Life...24 hours on the trail of male supermodel Tim Boyce” which covered aspects of Boyce's career, romantic life, and fitness regimen set against the streets of New York City. The article, which also charted the course of the male modeling industry from the 1970s, noted that another gay male model pulled out of being included in the article despite recent advancements made by female gay and bisexual models such as Jenny Shimizu, Rachel Williams and Patricia Velasquez who made it safer to come out with less risk to their careers.

Three years after Boyce's public disclosure in Out Magazine, the nation's leading gay and lesbian media platform, he was mentioned in a 1998 article of another leading gay publication, The Advocate, that called out the fashion world for still not being a safe place for a gay model to come out and that being publicly gay was not perceived as an option. In 2018, the reluctance of male models to come out remained an issue among fashion industry leaders, when the editor of British Vogue, Edward Enninful, explained that the Hollywood ideal of the “perfect man” prevented many gay male models from discussing their sexual preferences, that doing so may hinder their careers. “It's like...this old notion of what it meant to be a man and that this perfect man couldn't be gay. We know that's wrong,” Enninful said, adding that more models are beginning to feel comfortable coming out, a sign that the fashion industry is progressing in a positive way.
