= Frank Sepe =

American fitness model and TV personality

- Born: December 28, 1971 (age 54); Rosedale, New York
- Occupations: Fitness author fitness model fitness trainer bodybuilder photographer
- Modeling information
- Height: 1.88 m (6 ft 2 in)

Frank Sepe (born December 28, 1971, in Rosedale, New York) is an American fitness author, magazine editor, TV personality, and a fitness model of Italian and German descent.

== Biography ==
Sepe has been featured on more than 100 magazine covers all over the world, on romance book covers, in hundreds of bodybuilding magazine articles, and on such television programs as Inside Edition, the Late Show with David Letterman, The Howard Stern Show, Late Night with Conan O'Brien, and Hard Copy. Sepe was fitness host for ESPN2 Cold Pizza. Frank appeared in two movies: Carlito's Way and Shortcut to Happiness. He also hosted a call-in fitness radio show called The Truth on HayHouseradio.com in 2006.

Sepe is a columnist in fitness magazines and has contributed to dozens of magazines such as Good Housekeeping, Cosmopolitan, MuscleMag and American Health & Fitness. He was the managing editor for magazines AXL, HealthSmart Today and Healthwatchers. He currently is the editor and chief of the MET-Rx Fitness Magazine and owned magazine MAQ -Men's Athletic Quarterly (www.maqmag.com) which he sold in 2009.

Sepe also is a photographer. He has photographed celebrities, pro athletes and fitness model. He has shot covers for dozens of magazines and ad campaigns for METRX and WW Nutrition. He has published three books in the health & fitness/nutrition fields, in what became a series based on his first book, The Truth (Hay House, 2004).

In 2009, Sepe launched his own brand of health and fitness products on the Home Shopping Network in the United States, "Frank Sepe Fitness as a Lifestyle". His debut on the network was on July 28, 2009, and sold out all his product in record time. He will be featured regularly on HSN selling health-based products. Sepe wrote two new books for HSN, Fitness as a Lifestyle and a companion book, 100 Questions and Answers about Training and Nutrition.

Sepe is 6 ft 2 in (188 cm) tall and weighs 220 pounds (100 kg).

== Books ==
- The Truth (Hay House, 2004)
- Frank Sepe's Abs-Olutely Perfect Plan for A Flatter Stomach (Hay House, 2005)
- TRUTH Body Solutions: Truthful Nutritional Strategies for a Better Body and a Better Life (Hay House, 2006)
- "100 Questions and Answers about Training and Nutrition.(HSN, 2009)
- "Fitness as a Lifestyle (HSN, 2009)

== Writing and publishing ==
He contributed as a monthly columnist or fitness source to numerous men's and women's fitness publications, including American Health and Fitness, MMI, Oxygen, Cosmopolitan, and Good Housekeeping magazines. He wrote 144 fitness and nutrition columns for MuscleMag International magazine from 1996 to 2008. He was a co-founder of Nigel Media inc and consultant for Star76 Designs – a design company specializing in creating strong branding for social and environmentally-conscious companies.

He was a co-founder and editor-in-chief of Men's Athletic Quarterly Magazine. MAQ is a nationally distributed magazine that is celebrity and pro athlete driven. The content of the publication includes, fitness, music, fashion, pop culture, sports, girls, etc. He was a Group Editor for Intra-Media Publishing, in charge of editorial for women's magazines Health-Smart Today and Health-Watchers. He was also in charge of AXL magazine, a 350,000 circulation men's fitness magazine. The three publications had a combined yearly circulation of 4.6 million.

== Bodybuilding ==
- NPC Eastern USA Bodybuilding Heavyweight Champion
- NPC Metropolitan Bodybuilding Championships – Overall Champion
- IFBB North American Championships, 5th Heavyweight
- Pro IFBB Women's and Men's Fitness, Figure, Bikini and Bodybuilding judge
- NPC Fitness, Figure, Bikini and Bodybuilding judge
- 2003 NPC Long Island Classic Men's Bodybuilding judge

=== TV, film and radio ===
- Hosted live fitness segments for ESPN2 Cold Pizza (a sports variety show)
- Featured on ESPN- American Muscle Magazine (7 times)
- Fitness and Nutritional Expert for various TV news channels
- Appeared on Fox Business News, Good Morning America Health, Regis and Kelly, Conan O'Brien, Inside Edition, Hard Copy
- Hay House Radio Host: Hosted live one-hour call in Q and A radio show based on fitness, nutrition and motivation
- Guest on dozens of radio shows over the last ten years. Most recently Cosmo radio show on Sirius Xm radio (topic: bikini season)
- Featured in national TV commercials for MET-Rx
- Appeared in movies: Carlito's Way, Shortcut to Happiness

=== Radio host ===
Hosted (2006) The Truth, a one-hour call-in radio program about Fitness and nutrition for Hay House Radio.

=== Model ===
- Sepe appeared on over 100 magazine covers domestic and international (i.e., Muscle and Fitnes, Ironman, Muscular Development, Popular Mechanics, etc.)
- Named Top Fitness Model and most photographed bodybuilder in the world by TV show Hard Copy, ESPN-American Muscle Magazine and MuscleMag International magazine
- Featured and have appeared in hundreds of fitness magazines and publications over the last 12 years
- Appeared on dozens of romance novels. (Harlequin)
- Fashion model (i.e., Versace ads). Appeared in Flaunt, ID fashion magazines. Photographed by David Lachapelle
- Spokesperson for MET-Rx 1995–2008 appearing in National Print Advertising campaigns and commercials
- Featured on the cover of the Muscle Mag Encyclopedia of Bodybuilding.
- Featured inside the Arnold Schwarzenegger Encyclopedia of Bodybuilding
- Featured in additional fitness books etc.

=== Trainer ===
- Named Top 5 Trainers in New York City by Hollywood Shape magazine
- Fitness/Personal Trainer expert on TV's ESPN Cold Pizza show
- Sat on board of directors for World's Greatest Personal Trainer
- Fitness personal trainer expert on The Howard Stern Show (2 episodes)

== See also ==
- List of 21st-century writers
