= Albert Freedman =

American television producer

- Born: March 27, 1922; Taunton, Massachusetts, U.S.
- Died: April 11, 2017 (aged 95); Greenbrae, California, U.S.
- Education: Boston College; University of Southern California; Institut des hautes études cinématographiques
- Known for: 1950s quiz show scandals
- Spouses: Esther Katz; Nancy
- Children: 6, including 2 stepchildren

Albert Freedman (March 27, 1922 – April 11, 2017) was an American television producer who was involved with the 1950s quiz show scandals. He became a central figure in the cheating scandals and was the first person indicted. He was arrested for perjury after lying about giving contestants questions, and then recanted his grand jury testimony which led to the arrests of 14 former contestants. After the quiz show investigations concluded, Freedman moved to London to work in pornography publications.

== Early life ==
He was born on March 27, 1922, in Taunton, Massachusetts. During World War II he enlisted in the U.S. Marines and was sent to the Pacific Theater. After the war Freedman went to study at Boston College, and later at the University of Southern California. He also studied in Paris at the Institut des hautes études cinématographiques. He was married to Esther Katz and had four children with her.

== Career ==
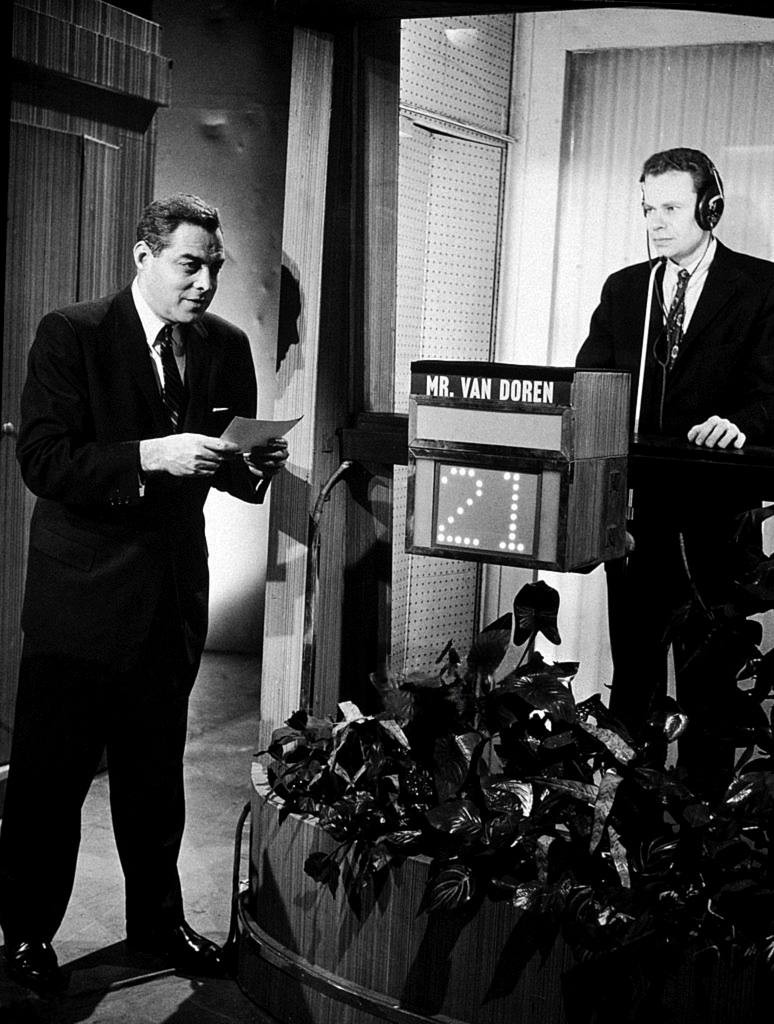
Twenty-One host Jack Barry (left) and Charles Van Doren (right) on an episode of Twenty-One in 1957.

In the 1950s television was just becoming popular, and Freedman moved to New York and got a job with a Groucho Marx show called You Bet Your Life before becoming a television producer. He produced a show called Tic-Tac-Dough and The Big Surprise. Quiz shows also gained popularity: CBS started a show called The $64,000 Question and it was immediately very popular. Dan Enright started a show called Twenty-One to compete, it was produced by Entertainment Productions Inc. Freedman took over producing Twenty-One in 1956. At the time, the show Twenty-One had a contestant named Herb Stempel who seemed unstoppable. The continuing success of Stempel caused the show's ratings to fall. In response, Geritol (the show's sponsor) sought a new contestant to rival Stempel.

=== Scandal ===
In 1956 Freedman found a teacher from Columbia University named Charles Van Doren who he thought could be a rival to Stempel. He planned to do this by helping Van Doren cheat. In a 2008 New Yorker Magazine article Van Doren stated that Freedman told him, "I've thought about it, Charlie, and I've decided you should be the person to beat Stempel. And I'll help you do it." In speaking to the Archive of American Television in 2000, Freedman would only admit that he told Van Doren what to study prior to the shows. Van Doren debuted on the show November 28, 1956.

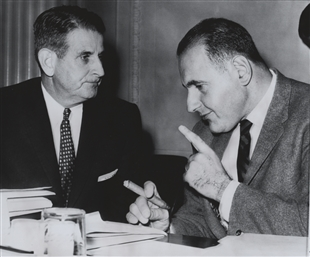
November 4, 1959, Representatives Oren Harris (left) and Steven Derounian (right) confer during the House Subcommittee on Legislative Oversight investigation of quiz shows

in 1958 another contestant on Twenty-One (Elfrida von Nardroff) went on to have a long run on the show and earned $220,500 in winnings. Shortly after her appearance on the show, an investigation into quiz shows was begun by Manhattan District Attorney, Frank Hogan. The investigation was prompted by a standby contestant who had hoped to be on the television show Dotto. The contestant complained to the New York District Attorney's office about irregularities.

The Manhattan district attorney's investigation discovered that Twenty-One had been paying some contestants to lose. The trouble began when a losing contestant did not receive compensation that was promised to him. The man went to the media and revealed the game show's scheme. A grand jury was convened on September 17, 1958, to look into allegations which were made regarding quiz shows. The Grand Jury heard from more than 200 witnesses over a nine-month period. On November 7, 1958, Freedman became the first person indicted and arrested in the quiz show scandal. He became the central figure in the quiz show scandals. When Freedman was previously before the grand jury he had denied that he supplied contestants with answers, and when he was led out of court after his testimony he stated, "Everything I told the grand jury is the truth." Van Doren stated that Freedman tried to extort $5000 from him as payment for Freedman helping him win: a charge which Freedman denied.

In September 1959 Freedman admitted he had lied to the grand jury and he was indicted for perjury. He was arrested and then recanted his testimony to the grand jury in order to avoid a conviction. He was facing two counts of perjury and 10 years in prison. Faced with the prospect of prison, he finally admitted that he had given contestants answers. On October 7, 1959, he testified before the House Subcommittee on Legislative Oversight and admitted that he assisted contestants on the show "21" about 50% of the time. In 1962, von Nardroff pleaded guilty to second-degree perjury and Van Doren pleaded guilty to perjury. Twelve other former contestants were also arrested in the scandal.

== Later life ==
Freedman relocated in London and worked for Penthouse and other pornography publications. In 1981 Freedman went on to earn a Ph.D. from the Institute for the Advanced Study of Human Sexuality. He later remarried to his second wife, Nancy Blumberg, and took on her two children as stepchildren. Freedman died of heart failure on April 11, 2017. At the time of his death he lived in Greenbrae, California.

== Popular culture ==
In 1994, the film Quiz Show was released and it depicted the events of the 1950s quiz show scandal. It was directed and produced by Robert Redford and Albert Freedman was portrayed by Hank Azaria. Freedman said he did not enjoy the movie, because it made it seem as if there was more cheating than there actually was on "Twenty-One".
