= Herb Stempel =

American game show contestant (1926–2020)

- Stempel in 1956
- Born: Herbert Milton Stempel; December 19, 1926; New York City, New York, U.S.
- Died: April 7, 2020 (aged 93); New York City, New York, U.S.
- Education: City College of New York (attended)
- Occupations: Soldier, examiner before trial, New York City Dept of Transportation; former television game show contestant.
- Years active: 1944–2010
- Known for: 1950s quiz show scandals
- Spouse(s): Toby Stempel (deceased); Ethel Stempel
- Children: 1

Herbert Milton Stempel (December 19, 1926 – April 7, 2020) was an American television game show contestant and subsequent whistleblower on the fraudulent nature of the industry, in what became known as the 1950s quiz show scandals. His rigged six-week appearance as a winning contestant on the 1950s show Twenty-One ended in an equally rigged defeat by Columbia University teacher and literary scion Charles Van Doren.

== Early life ==
Stempel attended P.S. 89 in Queens, and was a self-described "avid reader" who was "interested in everything". He was skipped ahead several classes in school, so much so that his mother worried he was being pushed too far. When he was seven, his father died, and Stempel, his mother, and his older sister Harriet moved to what he describes as a "poorer part of the Bronx". It was in the midst of the Depression, and the struggling family was on public assistance for years.

Twenty-One was not Stempel's first quiz show. At a very young age, Stempel realized he had what he called a "retentive memory", in that he could read a page about a subject and summarize that page months later. He represented his elementary school, P.S. 6, on a radio quiz show, Americana History, where he remained undefeated for several weeks. He was one of the "Kid Wizards", a three-man team who represented The Bronx High School of Science in competitions against New York high schools, remaining undefeated throughout the year. He claimed his IQ was measured at 170.

Stempel graduated from the Bronx High School of Science in January 1944 and briefly attended classes at City College of New York (CCNY) before enlisting in the United States Army. He served in the 311th Regiment of the 78th Infantry Division and was on the front lines in Europe for a month before the war ended. Stempel remained in the Army for the next seven years, attending counterintelligence school in Baltimore, Maryland and serving as "an agent" until 1952, when he began work in the United States Post Office as a clerk. He married his wife, Toby, in 1954 and returned to CCNY on the G.I. Bill.

== Twenty-One ==
In 1956, after tuning in to a new program, Twenty-One, he was intrigued by the questions and wrote to Dan Enright, the show's producer, asking to be a contestant. The qualifying trivia test took three-and-a-half hours; Stempel got 251 out of 363 questions right, which he claimed was the highest score ever achieved.

At a time when the top five highest-rated programs on television were quiz shows, Twenty-One was a mainstay for Barry & Enright Productions and NBC, which aired the show:

It was the most impactful show we've ever had. The show went on the air in 1956 and we felt that it had such great quality and content to it that we would not have to rig it. In fact, the first show of Twenty-One was not rigged and the first show of Twenty-One was a dismal failure. It was just plain dull. Neither contestant was able to answer the questions, and the score remained at zero. It lacked all drama, it lacked all suspense. And next morning, the sponsor called my partner, Jack Barry, and me and told us in no uncertain terms that he never wanted to see a repeat of what happened the previous night. And from that moment on, we decided to rig Twenty-One.

— Dan Enright

Contestants on Twenty-One were given the questions and answers in advance and were coached as if they were actors, receiving instructions on which questions to answer correctly or incorrectly and how to behave during the game.

Several weeks later, Enright paid Stempel a visit while his wife was out at the theater and he was looking after their young son, and posed the fateful question: "How would you like to make $25,000?" Stempel immediately understood the implications; Enright was not going to pay him just for appearing on the show, when he could be easily defeated.

Once I said "Who wouldn't?," I became part of the game show hoax.

— Herb Stempel

Stempel was not only provided with coaching on the answers and directions on how to deliver them, but on his physical appearance as well. Stempel was married to a woman whose family had money and the couple was not suffering financially, but Enright decided that the image of an underdog, a penniless GI working his way through school, would appeal to the American public. Enright personally selected his wardrobe: an oversized, baggy double-breasted suit that had belonged to Stempel's late father-in-law, a blue shirt with a frayed collar, "terrible looking" tie, and an old "Timex watch that ticked like an alarm clock", the sound of which would be picked up by the studio microphone and thus help build suspense.

The whole idea was to make me appear like an ex-G.I. working his way through college. The reason I had been asked to put on this old, ill-fitting suit and get this Marine-type haircut was to make me appear as what you would call today, a nerd, a square. ... I was never to call the Master of Ceremonies, Jack Barry, "Jack." I was always to call him "Mr. Barry" and be very, very humble and very sheepish. On the first program I was on, I was on for approximately four minutes and I won approximately $9,000. I had never had that much money in my life and I was absolutely flabbergasted.

— Herb Stempel

Enright later explained the reasons behind this:

You want the viewer to react emotionally to a contestant. Whether he reacts favorably or negatively is really not that important. The important thing is that he reacts. He should watch a contestant, hoping that the contestant will win or he should watch the contestant, hoping the contestant will lose. And Herb, I felt, was the type of personality who instilled the latter. Viewers would watch him and pray for his opponent to win. ... When he applied to the show and he took the test, he scored a very, very high score. He was the type of contestant who could very well antagonize viewers.

Stempel ostensibly won $69,500, which was presented to him as an unnotarized "settlement" agreement.

As weeks went by, people began to recognize me more and more. I got more and more fan mail. My classmates at college were very proud of me. My professors were proud of me. I just couldn't hold this inside of me, though, because I was overjoyed about being a celebrity, winning and so forth. I was overwhelmed. ... Then, Dan Enright said to me, "You know, Herb, you're not going to get all the money that you've won so far or are going to win." I said, "What? What do you mean?" He says, "No," he says, "We have to look out for ourselves, so I have a paper here which you're going to have to sign." I realized that if I didn't sign, I might not find myself on the program too much longer, so I decided to sign.

— Herb Stempel

Even though Stempel agreed to take less money, that actually made no difference: his ratings were dropping and the producers decided he had to go. A new contestant was selected to challenge him and knock him off. He was an English instructor at Columbia University, Charles Van Doren. Van Doren was persuaded to go along with the fraud by an appeal that his appearance would help glamorize information and intellectualism. His impact was immediate and his name quickly became synonymous with quiz shows. For week after week, the two men battled it out, tying with scores of 21–21, as tens of millions of Americans tuned in to see if their new hero would beat Stempel.

I told Herb Stempel that he was going to be losing that night to Charles Van Doren. He asked me whether he could not forgo the losing and whether he could not play against Van Doren clean [suggesting it could be touted as a duel between Columbia University and CCNY] and I said "no" and I reminded him he had given me his word that when I would ask him to lose, he would lose.

— Dan Enright

Enright promised Stempel a subsequent television job if he would finish the performance they had started, but the final act, as choreographed by Enright, was particularly humiliating to Stempel. The question was, "What motion picture won the Academy Award for 1955?"

I knew that the answer was Marty, but Dan Enright specifically wanted me to miss that question. This hurt me very deeply because this was one of my favorite pictures of all times and I could never forget this. A few seconds before that as I was trying to come up with the answer, I could have changed my mind. I could have said, 'The answer is Marty,' instead of On the Waterfront. I would have won. There would have been no Charles Van Doren, no famous celebrity. Charles Van Doren would have gone back to teaching college and my whole life would have been changed. ... On the day I was due to lose to Van Doren, I sat home, watching television in the morning. Every few minutes, an announcement would break in on WNBC, saying, "Is Herb Stempel going to win over $100,000 tonight?" And I said, "No, he's not going to win $100,000. He's going to take a dive."

— Herb Stempel

Years later Dan Enright stated in the WGBH documentary American Experience: The Quiz Show Scandal interview:

This man was taken from obscurity—he came from rather impoverished circumstances—taken from obscurity and then exposed to the light of celebrity, became for some six weeks a celebrity and then just as quickly was cast back into obscurity. And we, at the time deluded ourselves into believing that what we were doing was not that wrong and I bear a tremendous guilt to Herb Stempel and I was sorry. I should have been far more mindful and far more sensitive.

— Dan Enright, 1991

[Do I believe it?] No. I believe he feels bad that I exposed his show. That's my real belief.

— Herb Stempel, 2004

On December 5, 1956, Van Doren defeated Stempel before 15 million viewers. Van Doren went on to become the single most popular contestant in the quiz show's early history, while Stempel became the forgotten man. (In the closing minutes of his last Twenty-One appearance, asked what he would do with his winnings, a subdued Stempel said that after provisions were made for his family, he would donate a modest sum to the City College Fund “to repay the people of the city of New York for the free education they have given me”.) After his loss, Stempel overheard one backstage technician say to another: "At least, we finally have a clean-cut intellectual on this program, not a freak with a sponge memory." Enright's promise to find Stempel a panel show slot after his college graduation went unfulfilled. When Stempel, who by then had gone through his winnings, later demanded Enright follow through on his original promise, Enright demanded he first sign a statement affirming he had never been coached on Twenty-One. Again, no show materialized.

=== Exposure ===
When Enright subsequently told him the promise could not be kept because he had sold his shows to NBC itself, Stempel called Jack O'Brian, a columnist who covered television for the New York City Journal-American. Although O'Brian found the story hung together, the paper's syndicate, fearing a libel suit, refused to print the allegation without further corroboration. Stempel later testified to Congress that in February 1957 he had spoken with a reporter from the New York Post, but that paper had the same reservations as the Journal-American. There were no corroborating witnesses or hard evidence to back up Stempel's accusations, and Enright dismissed them as being rooted in jealousy over Van Doren's success.

It took Ed Hilgemeier, a contestant-in-waiting who found a notebook full of answers belonging to Marie Winn, another contestant on the new quiz show Dotto, airing on CBS, to convince authorities and the Journal-American that Stempel should be taken seriously.

Manhattan Assistant District Attorney Joseph Stone, who directed two grand jury probes into the case, states that Enright described Stempel to him as "a disturbed person and a blackmailer" and denied ever giving Stempel advance questions and answers. Three days after Twenty-One contestant Richard Jackman, a writer from Oneonta, New York, told Stone that he, too, had been coached in advance of his appearance on October 3, NBC had canceled Twenty-One. The investigation of the 1950s quiz show scandals then began in earnest. Jackman only realized the game was fixed the night he appeared, when the questions he was asked were identical to the ones Enright had reviewed with him in a "practice session" that afternoon.

Enright quickly countered, denying any wrongdoing or fraud had taken place, suing the Journal-American, and mounting a campaign to discredit Stempel. At a sensational press conference, he attempted to demonstrate that Stempel was mentally unstable by playing a recording of a conversation with him that Enright had secretly taped. To further discredit him, Enright also produced the statement that Stempel had signed earlier, declaring that Twenty-One was an honest program, that Barry and Enright were beyond reproach, and that no rigging had taken place.

I was a damn fool to have signed such a thing, to have agreed to such a thing, but they again held out the prospects of jobs and money and this and that to me and I succumbed to that.

— Herb Stempel

Jack O'Brian felt there was an "undercurrent" of coercion going on. Not only did some of the producers lie to the grand jury, they also had urged contestants to perjure themselves. In lower Manhattan, the grand jury was convened for nine months and heard testimony from more than 150 contestants. It is estimated that more than 100 lied under oath. Stempel continued telling the truth to anyone who would listen, but it was his unsubstantiated word against everyone else's; there was still no hard corroborating evidence. His testimony to the DA and the grand jury implicated Van Doren in the fraud, but there was massive resistance in accepting this accusation.

Suddenly, to everyone's astonishment, the grand jury testimony was sealed from the public by Judge Mitchell Schweitzer, for reasons that to this day are still not clear. This was almost an unprecedented move in New York State; in the no fewer than 497 grand jury presentments that had been filed in New York county since 1869, not one had ever been sealed. Afraid that the public might never learn what the grand jury had uncovered, Frank Hogan, the New York County District Attorney (and a former classmate of Judge Schweitzer), filed a protest in the court of general sessions, spelling out why it was in the public interest to make the findings known. Suspicious of a cover-up, Congress called an immediate investigation. Once just a trivial form of entertainment, quiz shows were now the subject of investigation at the highest level of government.

Stempel told the U.S. House Subcommittee on Legislative Oversight what he told Stone. Particularly jarring was Stempel's revelation that he was strong-armed into incorrectly identifying what was, in fact, one of his favorite films:

This was supposed to be the twist of the Twenty-One program. In other words, the omniscient genius was supposed to know all the hard answers, but miss on the easy ones, because the public would figure one of two things. Either in his very, very erudite studies he had either glossed over this and missed it, or it was intended as a sop to the public at large to make them say, 'See, I knew the answer to this and the great genius, so and so, didn't.' That is about the effect of it.

— Herb Stempel

The kinescope that has survived of that episode shows that the round in which Stempel was ordered to provide the wrong answer actually ended in a tie. Stempel and Van Doren went on to yet another game during the same show. This time, Stempel failed to recall the name of William Allen White's popular editorials, What's the Matter with Kansas? "It just wouldn't help to guess," Stempel said softly in the booth, "I just don't know." The miss kept Stempel at zero, and Van Doren answered the questions in the category "Kings" successfully. Stempel drew the evening's biggest laugh when he was asked the fate of four of Henry VIII's wives and answered, "They all died." Stempel answered the question correctly, but when offered their standard opportunity to stop the game, Van Doren stopped it and became the new Twenty-One champion.

As the investigation progressed, Charles Van Doren, now a host on The Today Show, was under pressure from NBC to testify. To avoid the committee's subpoena, he went into hiding. It was another former Twenty-One contestant, an artist named James Snodgrass, who finally provided indisputable supporting proof that the show had been rigged. Snodgrass had documented every answer he was coached on in a series of registered letters he mailed to himself before the show was taped.

One month after the hearings began, Van Doren emerged from hiding and confessed before the committee that he had been complicit in the fraud.

=== Life after the scandal ===
Following the scandal, Stempel finished college on the G.I. Bill. He went to work for the New York City Transportation Department for the next two decades, performing examinations before trial, which meant he represented the Department in depositions by opposing counsel, testifying to various records in the city's possession.

It was not until he was approached, some thirty years later, by the producers of the documentary The Quiz Show Scandals for PBS's American Experience, that he finally agreed to be interviewed on the subject. Julian Krainin, who co-produced the film, also co-produced the 1994 feature film Quiz Show, in which Stempel was portrayed by John Turturro. Stempel actually made an uncredited film debut in that movie, portraying a different contestant being interviewed by the congressional investigator Dick Goodwin, played by Rob Morrow. When Quiz Show was released, in spite of being "a little miffed by the portrayal", which he thought was "an over-the-top sort of portrayal of me", Stempel embraced the renewed public interest in him, giving interviews on radio and television (notably appearing on Late Night with Conan O'Brien, taped in the same NBC studio Twenty-One once occupied), as well as lecturing at some colleges about the quiz scandals.

Every time Quiz Show is shown on television, invariably the phone rings and some character at the other end says, "What picture won the Academy Award in 1955?"

— Herb Stempel, 2004

In 2008, Charles Van Doren broke his long silence, and in an article in The New Yorker described the overtures Robert Redford's production company made to him to cooperate with the filming of Quiz Show. He claimed that Barry & Enright Productions staffer Albert Freedman was actually responsible for scripting the entire Stempel–Van Doren competition, and rejected the image of Stempel as a penurious CCNY student:

In fact, he was a Marines [Stempel was actually in the U.S. Army] veteran married to a woman of some means who once appeared on the set wearing a Persian-lamb coat and was quickly spirited away so that she wouldn't blow his cover.

Van Doren wrote that until he viewed WGBH's American Experience documentary The Quiz Show Scandals he was ignorant of the fact that the show had once been honest—at least for one episode—and that: "Herb Stempel was the first to agree to the fix".

This latter remark is debatable. Dan Enright has stated that due to the sponsor's displeasure he began to rig the show immediately after the premiere episode debuted on September 12, 1956. Whether the contestants in the five weeks before Stempel's choreographed October 17 appearance unwittingly received the answers in "practice sessions" the way Richard Jackman described, or were openly coached the same way Stempel was, is unclear. According to Jackman, an earlier contestant than Stempel, Enright was extremely nervous before his appearance on the show and stated, to Jackman's bewilderment: "You are in a position to destroy my career." After Jackman, a struggling author, told Enright he could not continue on a rigged show, Enright tried various types of persuasion and offers of money to persuade him to change his mind. Jackman finally accepted a check for $15,000, and for continuity's sake promised to appear again so he could publicly choose to take his "winnings" and depart at the beginning of the show. Kent Anderson portrays Enright as someone who would make certain his next contestant would cooperate. Enright is described as deliberately targeting Stempel's emotions, as he did with other contestants, leaving no angle overlooked when trying to gain their full participation.

I had been a poor boy all my life, and I was sort of overjoyed, and I took it for granted that this was the way things were run on these programs ... I was stunned, I didn't know what to say ... I told him I would do it.

— Herb Stempel

Stempel died April 7, 2020, almost exactly one year after the death of his rival Charles Van Doren, and at the same age. His death was not publicly announced until nearly two months later.
