= House Subcommittee on Legislative Oversight =

U.S. Government subcommittee investigating the broadcasting industry

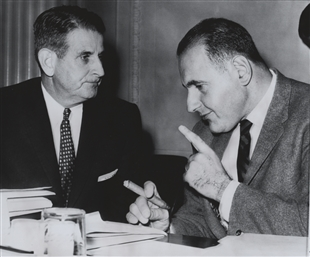
November 4, 1959 Representatives Oren Harris (left) and Steven B. Derounian confer during the investigation of quiz shows

The House Subcommittee on Legislative Oversight was a special subcommittee of the House Committee on Interstate and Foreign Commerce, responsible for the oversight of federal regulatory agencies such as the Federal Communications Commission. During the 86th Congress in 1959, the subcommittee was chaired by Representative Oren Harris, a Democrat from Arkansas. The subcommittee is famous for its hearings regarding payola and the quiz show scandals of the 1950s. The investigations conducted led to regulation in the broadcast industry.

== Proceedings ==
The special subcommittee investigated the quiz show scandals and the issue of payola. The aforementioned scandal involved rigged televised quiz shows which were portrayed as legitimate throughout the 1950s, while payola is the act of paying radio stations or disc jockeys to get them to play or promote certain songs. The investigations began in 1959 and continued into 1960. The subcommittee was led by Oren Harris, who first ordered an investigation into quiz shows in October 1959. The hearings attracted much interest from the media and the public. First, the subcommittee sent attorney Richard N. Goodwin to serve subpoenas to central figures in the quiz show scandals. Goodwin was said to have terrorized and threatened those he was serving.

=== Quiz show hearings ===
Harris was rumored to have been embroiled in a conflict of interest regarding his financial ties to a television station in his home state of Arkansas. According to speculation, Harris started his pursuit of such stations to clean up his image. The hearings were "standing room only" political theatre.

In 1959 the subcommittee began hearings on the irregularities regarding quiz shows. Charles Van Doren testified at the hearing and admitted that he cheated, explaining that it made for better entertainment. Van Doren stated that he was coached in how to make his behaviors more dramatic. He also admitted that he was given questions in order to beat the reigning champion Herb Stempel on Twenty-One. Van Doren also said that the show allowed him to lose after 15 weeks at his request.

=== Payola hearings ===
The subcommittee's first hearings into payola in the music industry were held from February to May 1960. The subcommittee concluded that 255 disc jockeys spanning 42 cities collected a combined $263,000 in bribes. President Eisenhower called it "an issue of public morality". The Federal Communications Commission proposed to make it a crime to be involved in payola.

Wesley Hopkins, a Cleveland DJ, admitted that he had received $12,000 from record companies in 1958 and 1959. The main concern of the subcommittee was a matter of public trust. In another form of payola, DJs would get a songwriting credit, allowing them to receive royalties so that they would be encouraged to play the song. The reputation of Cleveland DJ Alan Freed was damaged by the hearings.

== Outcome ==
As a result of the quiz show investigations, Charles Van Doren pled guilty to perjury. In 1962, Elfrida von Nardroff pled guilty to second-degree perjury. Twelve other former quiz show contestants were also arrested in the scandal.

Payola was made illegal in 1960. In December 1962, after being charged on multiple counts of commercial bribery, DJ Alan Freed pled guilty to two counts of commercial bribery and was fined $300 and given a suspended sentence.

The investigations led to federal regulation of the broadcasting industry. The Communications Act Amendments of 1960 (S 1898) called for more regulation of the broadcasting industry. The rigging of game shows was made a federal crime and the FCC was given greater authority. Additionally, any payola had to be disclosed.

Some artists claim that the practice of payola still exists. Jacob Slichter, the drummer for the band Semisonic, said in 2006 that payola was how they turned their song "Closing Time" into a hit. Slichter stated: "It cost something close to $700,000 to $800,000 to get 'Closing Time' on the air." In a 2019 Rolling Stone article, Elias Right reported that payola never went away and has instead become more sophisticated. The investigation found that to get songs on the air, companies pay by other means than cash, such as plane tickets, sports tickets and shoes. Record companies also pay for advertising time on the radio and purchase billboards for those radio stations and merchandise like T-shirts. Payola also takes the form of artist appearances and or performances.
