= Robert E. Kintner =

American journalist (1909–1980)

Bob Kintner

Personal details
- Born: Robert Edmonds Kintner; September 12, 1909 Stroudsburg, Pennsylvania, U.S.
- Died: December 20, 1980 (aged 71) Washington, D.C., U.S.
- Party: Democratic
- Education: Swarthmore College (BA)

Robert Edmonds Kintner (September 12, 1909 – December 20, 1980) was an American journalist and television executive who served as president of both the National Broadcasting Company (NBC) and the American Broadcasting Company (ABC).

== Early life ==
The son of Albert H. Kintner and the former Lillian M. Stofflet, Robert grew up in Stroudsburg, Pennsylvania, and graduated from Stroudsburg High School in 1927. Kintner next attended Swarthmore College, where he served as editor of the college newspaper, the "Phoenix", during his senior year until graduating in 1931. Following his graduation, he spent the three months of the summer of 1931 doing publicity for the Buck Hill Falls, where he started a weekly newspaper called "The Breeze". The experience inspired him to forego his previous plans to attend law school and instead seek employment in news. However, no jobs were forthcoming, and he instead took a job as a researcher and editorial assistant to writer William S. Dutton.

== Reporter and columnist ==
About a year later, fellow Swarthmore alumnus C. Norman Stabler helped Kintner obtain a job as a financial reporter for the New York Herald Tribune. This was fortuitous timing for Kintner, as former New York chief assistant district attorney Ferdinand Pecora was appointed chief counsel to the U.S. Senate Committee on Banking and Currency in January 1933 to head up what became known as the Pecora Commission, given wide remit to investigate all the many financial abuses and crimes that had caused the Great Depression. In 1935, Kintner was transferred to the Washington bureau of the Herald Tribune.

From 1937 to 1941, he paired with Joseph Alsop to write a nationally syndicated column called "The Capital Parade". Alsop, a fellow reporter for the Herald Tribune, had arrived in Washington the year after Kintner. The North American Newspaper Alliance had approached Alsop in the fall of 1937, suggesting that he start a column with Turner Catledge, with whom Alsop had written a series of articles for The Saturday Evening Post. Catledge, the Senate Reporter for The New York Times, declined, so Alsop approached Kintner. The Capital Parade first appeared in November 1937.

In 1941, after it had become clear that the United States would soon enter World War II, Alsop and Kintner suspended their column and volunteered for the armed forces; Alsop to the Navy, and Kintner the Army.

== Military service ==
During World War II, Kintner served in the U.S. Army Air Force, leaving the service in 1944 with the rank of lieutenant colonel. He was discharged on medical grounds in 1944, having been injured in an airplane crash. Upon his discharge he joined ABC, which had been created in 1943 following the divestiture of NBC's Blue Network.

== Network executive ==
Kintner was hired straight out of the Army as a vice president of the Blue Network by candy magnate Edward J. Noble, whom Kintner had known from his days as a columnist, to do both public service and public relations work. In early 1945, Kintner was named vice president of news and news features. He rose rapidly at the then-small network, becoming an executive vice president in November 1946, and its president in 1949.

Kintner is credited with making ABC more competitive with the older and better-established networks NBC and CBS who also had radio networks. ABC forged partnerships with Warner Bros. Television and Walt Disney to offer a diverse range of programming to viewers. The network played a crucial role in broadcasting the Army-McCarthy hearings and showcased popular shows such as Disneyland, which featured a blockbuster hit with Davy Crockett. Another success was Cheyenne, the pioneering hour-long television Western that sparked a trend in Western-themed entertainment dominating the medium's lineup through 1963.

On February 16, 1956, Kintner resigned as president of ABC. He was forced out due to differences with Leonard H. Goldenson, who was president of American Broadcasting-Paramount Theatres, the company formed when Paramount Theatres merged with ABC in February of 1953. Goldenson took oversight of the ABC network.

Quickly snatched up by NBC, Kintner became an executive vice president on November 2, 1956, initially overseeing the network's color television operations. In July 1958, NBC President Robert W. Sarnoff was elevated to chairman of the board, and Kintner replaced him as president.

Kintner then led NBC from 1958 to 1965. His NBC tenure was marked by his aggressive effort to push NBC News past CBS News in rankings and prestige. The news department was given more money, leading to notable coverage of the 1960 presidential election campaign and the prominence of the Huntley-Brinkley Report.

=== Quiz-show scandals ===
Kintner was forced to defend NBC at the height of the late 1950s quiz show scandals, testifying to the United States Congress that NBC and the other networks were victims of the quiz-show rigging just as viewers were, and that the networks were working to wrest production control of programming from advertisers, whose pressure had been seen as a key influence driving the scandals.

== Cabinet secretary ==
Kintner returned to Washington, D.C. in 1966 after President Lyndon B. Johnson named him to be his White House Cabinet Secretary. However, Kintner's failing eyesight forced him to resign the following year.

== Private life ==
Kintner was married twice. He married Daisy Jean Nancy Andrews on January 20, 1934, but it ended in divorce in June 1939. On March 11, 1940, he married Jean Elaine Rodney, with whom he had three children: daughter Susan and sons Michael and Jeffrey. Kintner died from a heart ailment on December 20, 1980, in Washington, D.C.

== Cultural references ==
Kintner was portrayed by Allan Rich in Quiz Show, the 1994 film about the quiz-show scandal.
