= Steven Derounian =

American politician (1918–2007)

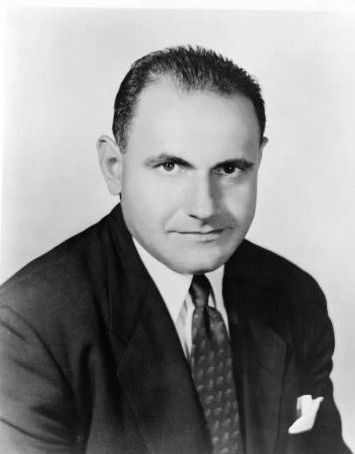

Member of the U.S. House of Representatives from New York
- In office January 3, 1953 – January 3, 1965
- Preceded by: Leonard Hall
- Succeeded by: Lester L. Wolff
- Constituency: 2nd district (1953–1963); 3rd district (1963–1965)

Personal details
- Born: Steven Boghos Derounian; April 6, 1918 Sofia, Kingdom of Bulgaria
- Died: April 17, 2007 (aged 89) Austin, Texas, U.S.
- Party: Republican
- Spouse: Emily Ann Kennard Derounian
- Education: New York University; Fordham University Law School
- Profession: Attorney; Professor

Military service
- Allegiance: United States
- Branch/service: United States Army
- Years of service: 1941–1946
- Rank: Captain
- Unit: 101st Airborne Division; 327th Infantry Regiment
- Battles/wars: World War II; Operation Overlord; Operation Market Garden; Battle of the Bulge; Western Allied invasion of Germany

Steven Boghos Derounian (April 6, 1918 – April 17, 2007) was a Bulgarian-born Armenian-American politician. A member of the Republican Party, Derounian served as a member of the United States House of Representatives from 2nd and later 3rd district, covering parts of Long Island from 1953 until 1965.

== Early life and education ==
Derounian was born in Sofia in the Kingdom of Bulgaria to Armenian parents Boghos Derounian and Eliza Aprahamian. When he was three, his family left Bulgaria with his two other brothers (one of whom was the journalist Avedis Boghos Derounian, better known as John Roy Carlson) to the United States and settled in Mineola, New York.

As a young man, Derounian helped at his father's store. In an anecdote recounted from this time, a customer complained that the 20-year-old Derounian overweighed a shipment of cheese, and his father rebuked him. The young Derounian apologized, but his father shot back:

"You made a mistake, and you're sorry. That's what every dishonest person says when he's caught. Sure, I know you didn't mean to do the wrong thing, but who else knows it? A reputation for honesty is one thing money can't buy. It can be preserved only by not making mistakes, not by making apologies. You remember that, boy, as long as you live."

He attended the public schools and graduated from New York University in 1938 and from Fordham University Law School in 1942.

== Career ==
He was admitted to the New York bar in 1942 and began practice in Mineola the same year. Derounian entered the United States Army as a private in July 1942 and graduated from officers school as an Infantry officer and was assigned to the 327th Infantry. He served overseas from October 1944 to March 1946 and separated from the service as a captain in May 1946. He was awarded the Purple Heart and the Bronze Star with oak leaf.

=== Politics ===
He was elected as a Republican to the Eighty-third and to the five succeeding Congresses (January 3, 1953 – January 3, 1965).

As a Congressman, Derounian was part of the Congressional Subcommittee that investigated the 1950s Quiz show scandals. This event is presented in Robert Redford's 1994 film Quiz Show, where Derounian is shown harshly criticizing Charles Van Doren, after he admits to cheating on the TV game show Twenty-One. When his fellow Congressmen praised Van Doren for his statement, Derounian dissented, saying:

"Mr. Van Doren, I am happy that you made the statement, but I cannot agree with most of my colleagues who commended you for telling the truth, because I don't think an adult of your intelligence ought to be commended for telling the truth."

Derounian voted in favor of the Civil Rights Acts of 1957, 1960, and 1964, as well as the 24th Amendment to the U.S. Constitution.

A staunch conservative and Barry Goldwater supporter, Derounian was narrowly defeated in New York's Third Congressional District on Long Island during the LBJ landslide of 1964 Democrat Lester Wolff won 96,503 (50.7%) votes to Derounian's 93,883 (49.3%). In 1966 Derounian defeated future CIA Director William Casey in the Republican primary, but was again defeated by Rep. Wolff in November, though by an even more narrow tally of 81,959 (50.3%) to 81,122 (49.7%).

Thereafter, he served as justice of the New York Supreme Court from 1969 to 1981.

== Retirement ==
He retired to Austin, Texas, saying "I think New York has gotten a little too crowded. Austin is an attractive, educational city." Derounian was additionally a professor of law at the University of Texas.

U.S. House of Representatives
Preceded by Leonard Hall	Member of the U.S. House of Representatives from New York's 2nd congressional district 1953–1963	Succeeded by James R. Grover, Jr.
Preceded by Frank J. Becker	Member of the U.S. House of Representatives from New York's 3rd congressional district 1963–1965	Succeeded by Lester L. Wolff
