= Princeton: A Search for Answers =

1973 film

- Directed by: Julian Krainin; DeWitt Sage
- Written by: DeWitt Sage
- Produced by: Julian Krainin; DeWitt Sage
- Cinematography: Ted Haimes; Julian Krainin
- Edited by: Sarah Stein
- Production company: Krainin/Sage Productions
- Distributed by: Princeton University
- Release date: 1973
- Running time: 30 minutes
- Country: United States
- Language: English

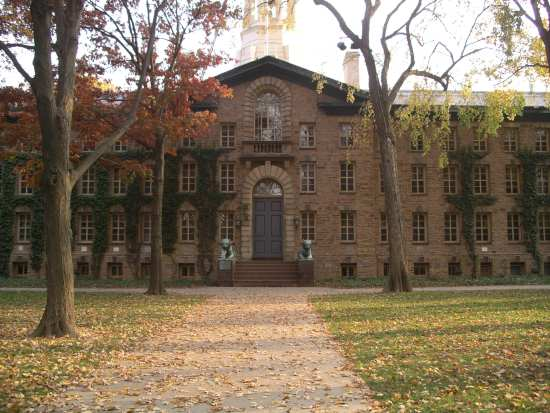
Nassau Hall at Princeton University

Princeton: A Search for Answers is a 1973 American short documentary film, directed by Julian Krainin and DeWitt Sage, and produced for the Princeton University Undergraduate Admissions Office as a recruiting film. In 1974, it won the Academy Award for Best Documentary (Short Subject) at the 46th Academy Awards.

== See also ==
- List of American films of 1973
