= Art Is... =

1971 film

- Directed by: Julian Krainin; DeWitt Sage
- Written by: Julian Krainin; DeWitt Sage
- Produced by: Julian Krainin; DeWitt Sage; Henry Strauss
- Cinematography: Julian Krainin
- Production company: Henry Strauss Productions for Associated Councils of the Arts
- Distributed by: Association Films
- Release date: 1971
- Country: United States
- Language: English

Art Is... is a 1971 American short documentary film directed by Julian Krainin. It was nominated for an Academy Award for Best Documentary Short.

Appearing are Leonard Berstein, Richard Serra, Jerome Roberts, Paper Bag Players (NYC), Ilse R. Johnson, Clifford Elder, and others. Funded by The Sears-Roebuck Foundation.

== See also ==
- List of American films of 1971
