= Richard N. Goodwin =

American lawyer and presidential advisor (1931–2018)

Dick Goodwin
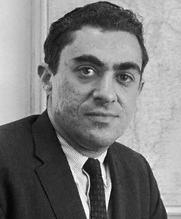
- Goodwin in 1965
- Born: Richard Naradof Goodwin; December 7, 1931; Boston, Massachusetts, U.S.
- Died: May 20, 2018 (aged 86); Concord, Massachusetts, U.S.
- Education: Tufts University (BA); Harvard University (LLB)
- Political party: Democratic
- Spouses: Sandra Leverant (m. 1958; died 1972) Doris Kearns (m. 1975)
- Children: 3

Richard Naradof Goodwin (December 7, 1931 – May 20, 2018) was an American writer and presidential advisor. He was an aide and speechwriter to Presidents John F. Kennedy and Lyndon B. Johnson, and to Senator Eugene McCarthy and Senator Robert F. Kennedy. He was married to historian Doris Kearns Goodwin for 42 years until his death in 2018 after a brief diagnosis of cancer.

== Early life and education ==
Goodwin was born on December 7, 1931, in Boston, Massachusetts, the son of Belle (née Fisher) and Joseph C. Goodwin, an engineer and insurance salesman. Goodwin was raised Jewish. Goodwin graduated from Brookline High School, and in 1953 graduated summa cum laude from Tufts University, where he was elected to Phi Beta Kappa.

He enlisted in the U.S. Army in 1954, and served as a private in post-World War II France. After returning to the United States, he studied at Harvard Law School, graduating in 1958, summa cum laude. He was first in his class and president of the Harvard Law Review.

== Career ==
=== Early career ===
After clerking for Justice Felix Frankfurter of the U.S. Supreme Court, Goodwin became counsel for the House Committee on Interstate and Foreign Commerce where Goodwin was involved in investigating quiz show scandals, particularly the Twenty-One scandal. This affair provided the story for the 1994 movie Quiz Show, in which Goodwin was portrayed by actor Rob Morrow.

=== Kennedy administration ===
Goodwin joined the speechwriting staff of John F. Kennedy in 1959. Fellow Kennedy speechwriter Ted Sorensen became a mentor to Goodwin. Goodwin was one of the youngest members of the group of "New Frontiersmen" who advised Kennedy; others included Fred Dutton, Ralph Dungan, Kenneth O'Donnell, and Harris Wofford, all of whom were under 37 years old.

In 1961, after Kennedy became president, Goodwin became assistant special counsel to the President and a member of the Task Force on Latin American Affairs. Later that year, Kennedy appointed him Deputy Assistant Secretary of State for Inter-American Affairs; Goodwin held this position until 1963. Goodwin reportedly opposed the Bay of Pigs invasion and unsuccessfully tried to persuade Kennedy not to order the operation.

In August 1961, Goodwin was part of a delegation headed by U.S. Treasury Secretary Douglas Dillon that was sent to Uruguay to attend a conference of Latin American finance ministers. The topic under discussion was the Alliance for Progress, which was endorsed by all countries representatives excepting Cuban representative Che Guevara. However, Guevara had no intentions of going home empty handed; he noticed that Goodwin smoked cigars during the meetings, and through an intermediary challenged him, suggesting he wouldn't dare smoke a Cuban cigar. Goodwin accepted the challenge, and subsequently, a gift of cigars in an elaborate polished mahogany box arrived from Guevara. Guevara expressed his desire to talk informally with Goodwin, and Goodwin received permission from Treasury Secretary Dillon. However, during the last day of the conference, Guevara had critical words for the press concerning the Alliance for Progress, and being the only representative to do so, speaking passionately on the topic, was upstaging the business-like, pin-striped, former-Wall-Street-banker Dillon. Dillon retracted his agreement for Guevara and Goodwin's meeting. However, Guevara persevered, and Goodwin agreed to listen, but he stressed that he had no real negotiating power.

Later that evening at a party, Brazilian and Argentinian officials acted as intermediaries; Guevara and Goodwin were introduced, and went to a separate room so they could talk. Jokingly, Guevara "thanked" Goodwin for the Bay of Pigs invasion that had occurred only a few months earlier, as it had only solidified support for Castro. The ice was broken between the two men. Although they understood their countries were not destined to be friendly allies, they focused on what they could accomplish for the sake of peace. Ultimately, they came to the non-binding conclusion that if Cuba would be willing to desist from forming any military alliances with the USSR, and not try to aid revolutionaries in other Latin American countries, America would be willing to stop trying to remove Castro by force and lift the trade embargo on Cuba, and vice versa. They agreed to reveal their conversation to only their respective leaders, Castro and Kennedy. Despite agreeing to detail to Castro what he discussed in their meeting, Guevara afterward contacted Goodwin through the Argentine participant of the meeting Horatio Larretta to express his appreciation.

After returning from Uruguay, Goodwin wrote a memo for Kennedy on the meeting, where he stated how successful he was in convincing Guevara that he was a member of Guevara's "newer generation" and how Guevara also sent another message to Goodwin where he described their meeting "quite profitable." While the meeting prompted a "minor political furor," President Kennedy was ultimately satisfied with the outcome of Goodwin's efforts, and was the first to smoke one of the contraband Cuban cigars Goodwin had brought back. "'Are they good?' the president asked. 'They're the best,' Goodwin replied, prompting Kennedy to immediately open Guevara's gift and sample one of the Havanas."

In July 1962, Goodwin met President Kennedy and U.S. Ambassador Lincoln Gordon and began assisting in plans for the eventual 1964 Brazil coup against then-Brazil President João Goulart.

Goodwin also did significant work in the Kennedy White House to relocate ancient Egyptian monuments that were threatened with destruction in the building of the Aswan Dam, including the Abu Simbel temples. Historian Arthur M. Schlesinger Jr., in his book A Thousand Days: John F. Kennedy in the White House, called Goodwin:

the supreme generalist who could turn from Latin America to saving the Nile Monuments, from civil rights to planning a White House dinner for the Nobel Prize winners, from composing a parody of Norman Mailer to drafting a piece of legislation, from lunching with a Supreme Court Justice to dining with [actress] Jean Seberg — and at the same time retain an unquenchable spirit of sardonic liberalism and unceasing drive to get things done.

Following the assassination of John F. Kennedy, Goodwin, at the request of Jacqueline Kennedy, arranged for an eternal flame to be placed at Kennedy's grave at Arlington National Cemetery.

=== Johnson administration ===
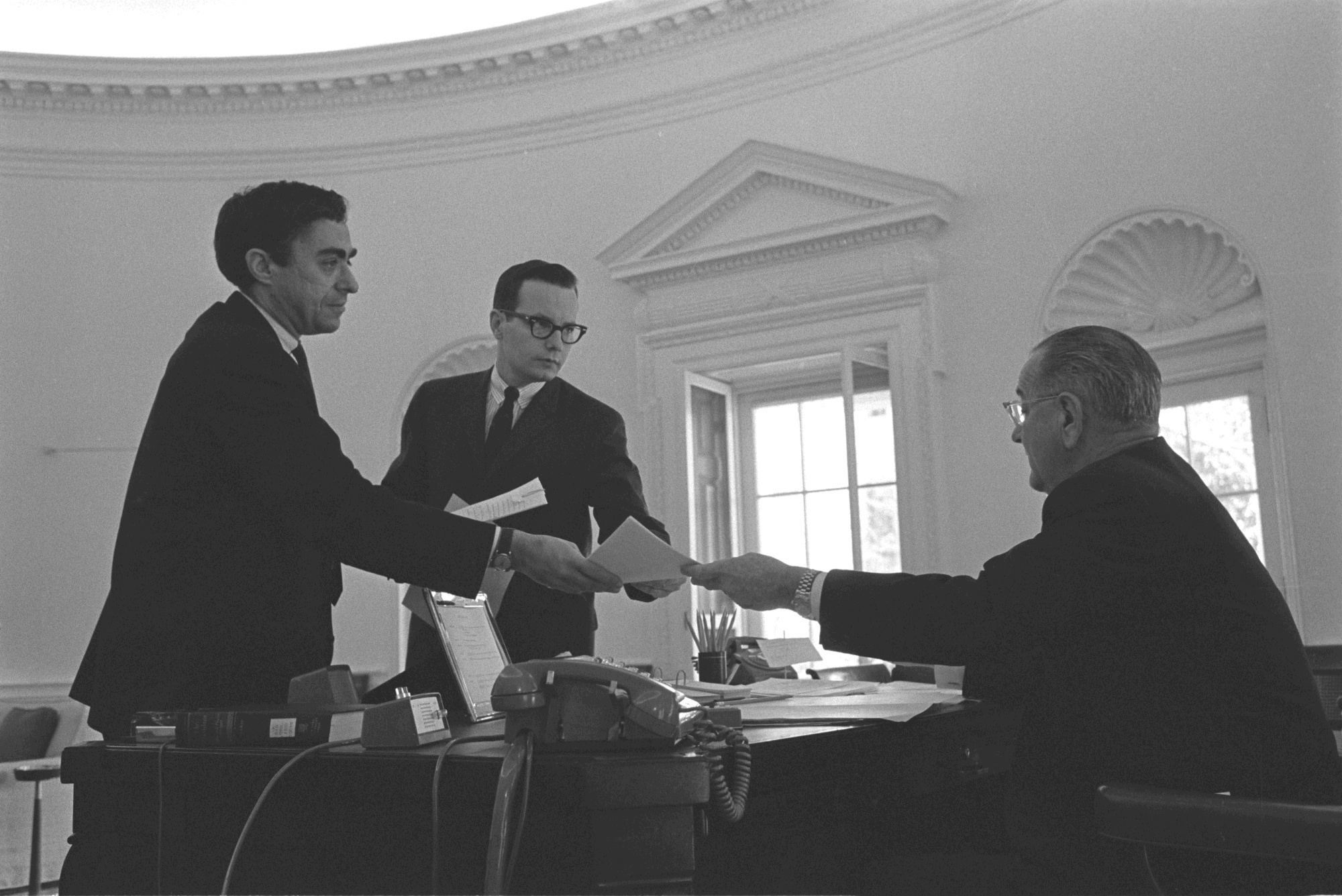
Goodwin in 1965 (left), with Bill Moyers and President Johnson in the Oval Office.

From 1963 to 1964, Goodwin served as the secretary-general of the International Peace Corps Secretariat. In 1964, he became special assistant to the president in the Lyndon B. Johnson administration. Goodwin has been credited with naming Johnson's legislative agenda "the Great Society", a term first used by Johnson in a May 1964 speech. Although Goodwin contributed to a speech for Johnson outlining the program, Bill Moyers, another Johnson advisor, was the principal author of the speech.

Goodwin wrote speeches for Johnson reacting to Bloody Sunday, the violent police suppression of civil rights marchers on the Edmund Pettus Bridge (1965) and calling for passage of the Voting Rights Act of 1965. Goodwin was also one of the writers of Robert F. Kennedy's Day of Affirmation Address (1966), the "ripple of hope" speech in which Kennedy denounced apartheid in South Africa. Goodwin was a key figure in the creation of the Alliance for Progress, a U.S. program to stimulate economic development in Latin America, and wrote a major speech for Johnson on the subject.

=== Career after government ===
In September 1965, Goodwin resigned from his White House position over his disillusionment with the Vietnam War. After his departure, Goodwin continued to write speeches for Johnson occasionally, the last being the 1966 State of the Union Address. In 1975, Time magazine reported that Goodwin had resigned after Johnson, who wanted to oust people close to Robert F. Kennedy from the White House, had asked FBI Director J. Edgar Hoover to investigate him. The next year, Goodwin publicly joined the antiwar movement, publishing Triumph or Tragedy: Reflections on Vietnam (1966), a book critical of the war. He also published articles criticizing the Johnson administration's actions in Vietnam in The New Yorker under a pseudonym.

After leaving government, Goodwin held teaching positions; he was a fellow at Wesleyan University's Center for Advanced Studies in Middletown, Connecticut, from 1965 to 1967 and was visiting professor of public affairs at the Massachusetts Institute of Technology in 1968. In 1968, Goodwin was briefly involved in Eugene McCarthy's presidential campaign, managing McCarthy's campaign in the New Hampshire primary, in which McCarthy won almost 42% of the vote, which was considered a moral, though not actual, victory over Johnson. Goodwin left McCarthy's campaign and worked for Senator Robert F. Kennedy after he entered the race.

Goodwin served briefly as political editor of Rolling Stone in 1974. He wrote a memoir, Remembering America: A Voice from the Sixties (1988). In 2000, he contributed some lines to the concession speech Al Gore wrote with his chief speechwriter Eli Attie following the Supreme Court's controversial decision in Bush v. Gore.

His work was published in The New Yorker and he wrote numerous books, articles and plays. In 2003, the Yvonne Arnaud Theatre in Guildford, England, produced his new work The Hinge of the World, which took as its subject matter the 17th-century conflict between Galileo Galilei and the Vatican. Retitled Two Men of Florence (referring to Galileo and his adversary Pope Urban VIII, who as Cardinal Maffeo Barberini had once been Galileo's mentor), the play made its American debut at the Huntington Theatre in Boston in March 2009.

== Awards and honors ==
Goodwin received the Public Leadership Award from the Aspen Institute and the Distinguished American Award from the John F. Kennedy Library.

== Personal life ==
Goodwin was married to Sandra Leverant from 1958 until her death in 1972. They had one son, Richard. On December 14, 1975, he married writer and historian Doris Kearns, with whom he had two children: Michael and Joseph. Goodwin died at his home in Concord, Massachusetts, on May 20, 2018, after a brief case of cancer. He was 86 years old.

== See also ==
- List of law clerks for the second seat of the Supreme Court of the United States
- Path to War
- Richard N. Goodwin Official Website

== Books ==
- Goodwin, Richard N. (1998). The Hinge of the World: In Which Professor Galileo Galilei, Chief Mathematician and Philosopher to His Serene Highness the Grand Duke of Tuscany, and His Holiness Urban VIII Battle for the Soul of the World. Farrar Straus & Giroux. ISBN 0-374-17002-9. OCLC 37854192.
- Goodwin, Richard N. (1988). Remembering America: A Voice From the Sixties. HarperCollins. ISBN 0-06-097241-6.
- Goodwin, Richard N. (1974). The American Condition. Doubleday. ISBN 0385004249.
- Goodwin, Richard N. (1992). Promises to Keep. Random House. ISBN 0-8129-2054-6.
