= International Secretariat for Volunteer Service =

Former U.S. program

The International Secretariat for Volunteer Service (ISVS; formerly the International Peace Corps Secretariat), was created by the United States to encourage and assist other countries interested in replicating the Peace Corps idea for their own country.

== History ==
In October 1962, the United States hosted forty-three nations at a conference on volunteer service (the International Conference on Middle Level Manpower) chaired by Vice-President Lyndon Johnson in Puerto Rico. At the conference, the Secretariat was called for and forty-one of the forty-three countries at the conference joined. It commenced operations soon thereafter in January 1963. On May 9, 1963, the Directors and Chief Administrators of the International Peace Corps Secretariat met in the White House Cabinet Room and President John F. Kennedy shared his hope that the exchange of ideas between the members of different countries will strengthen the Peace Corps and stimulate humanitarian work in developing nations. Eventually eighteen countries had volunteers serving abroad.

When more countries began to fund the work of the Secretariat in 1964, it was renamed the International Secretariat for Volunteer Service (ISVS) with a focus on promoting volunteer services for development around the world. William A. Delano served as the first Secretary General of ISVS.

== Leadership ==
From 1962 to 1964, Richard N. Goodwin served as the Director of the Secretariat.
