= Elfrida von Nardroff =

American game show contestant (1925–2021)

- Born: July 3, 1925; Northampton, Massachusetts, U.S.
- Died: November 11, 2021 (aged 96); Westhampton Beach, New York
- Known for: Game show contestant

Elfrida von Nardroff (July 3, 1925 – November 11, 2021) was an American game show contestant. In 1958, she won $220,500 (equivalent to $2,403,119 in 2024) on the game show Twenty-One, more money than any other contestant on the show. Later, it was revealed that there was cheating on the game show and von Nardroff committed perjury in Grand Jury proceedings.

== Early life ==
Elfrida von Nardroff was born on July 3, 1925, in Northampton, Massachusetts, to Robert (1895–1966), a physics professor at Columbia University, and Elizabeth von Nardroff.

She went to the college-preparatory school, Dwight-Englewood School in Englewood, New Jersey. She graduated from Duke University, earning an AB degree. From 1959 to 1963 she achieved ABD status in sociology from Columbia University Graduate School. She also studied literature at Oxford and Cambridge universities in England.

== Career ==
After graduation, from 1951 to 1958, she worked in personnel positions including two years for Northwest Airlines. In 1956 she received a call from a talent scout with the company who produced the game show Twenty-One. In 1958, she won $220,500 on the show, more money than any other contestant, and ($2,127,191.73) in 2021 dollars. She planned to use the money to attend school for a PhD in psychology.

She appeared on the game show in 1958 and then took a job in the advertising industry from 1963 to 1980. She completed her working career retiring from a New York City real estate broker.

=== Game show scandal ===
Shortly after her win, the game show was under investigation by the Manhattan district attorney, Frank S. Hogan, following a revelation that one of the contestants had been coached. Von Nardroff had claimed that she had done research at the New York Public Library filling notebooks, but Hogan's investigation found that claim to be false.

It was discovered that Twenty-One had been paying some contestants to lose. The trouble began when a losing contestant did not receive compensation that was promised to him. The man went to the media and revealed the game show's scheme.

von Nardroff was called to testify before a grand jury on November 12, 1958. She denied receiving any assistance. In 1958 she was also quoted in Life speaking about other contestants on the show, "They were respectable and intelligent people, it is inconceivable they could have been fixed." The investigation prompted ratings for all quiz shows to fall and by October 1958, Twenty-One was off the air.

She appeared before another grand jury in January 1959 to explain her multiple phone calls with the game show's producer Albert Freedman. She testified that she was only telling Freedman about her location.

In 1962, von Nardroff pleaded guilty to second-degree perjury along with 12 other former contestants. She received a suspended sentence.

== Death ==
von Nardroff died of a stroke on November 11, 2021, in a hospice in Westhampton Beach, New York.
