= Julian Krainin =

American film producer (born 1941)

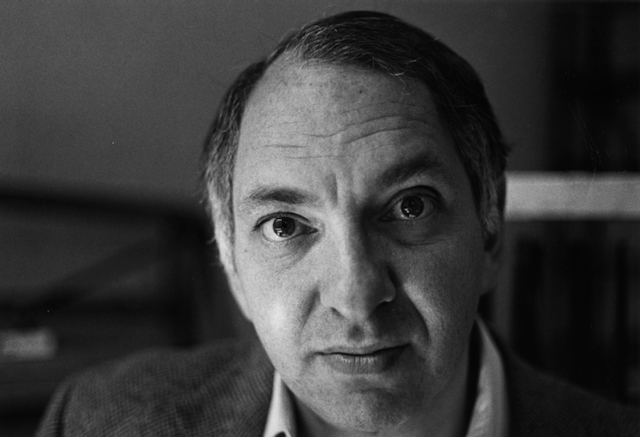
- Occupation: Filmmaker
- Years active: 1965–present
- Known for: Quiz Show
- Notable work: Princeton: A Search for Answers
- Awards: Academy Award for Best Documentary (Short Subject)

Julian Krainin (born January 24, 1941) is an American film producer, director, cinematographer, and scriptwriter. Notable films during his fifty-year career include Quiz Show, George Wallace, and Princeton: A Search for Answers, for which he has won an Academy Award, four Academy Award nominations, a Golden Globe, and two Emmy Awards.

== Life and career ==
Krainin was born in New York City, He was the son of David and Anne Krainin. After graduating from Forest Hills High School, he earned his bachelor’s degree from Allegheny College. Inspired by Lawrence of Arabia, he dropped out of Columbia University College of Physicians and Surgeons to pursue a career in film.

At Columbia film school, he produced The March, a chronicle of Martin Luther King’s Selma to Montgomery, Alabama march for civil rights. “We marched from that little town, Selma, at first with 500 to a thousand people. The next day it doubled and soon there were tens of thousands getting on planes, in cars, even coming from foreign countries to march,” recalled Krainin.

In 1995, he shared an Academy Award nomination as co-producer with Michael Jacobs, Michael Nozik and Robert Redford for Quiz Show (1994). Earlier, he had produced a documentary about the quiz show scandal for PBS's American Experience series, basing the story on interviews with participants who had not been interviewed in 30 years.

== Filmography ==
- Something the Lord Made (2004) (producer)
- The John Glenn Story: A Return to Space (1998)
- George Wallace (1997) Golden Globe Award, Best Television Mini-series and Best Television Movie
- Quiz Show (1994) Academy Award nomination for Best Picture
- American Experience: The Quiz Show Scandal (1993)
- Memory and Imagination! (1990)
- Disaster at Silo 7 (1988)
- Verdict: The Wrong Man (1986)
- The Smithsonian - A View from the Castle (1985)
- CBS Reports: Don’t Touch That Dial! (1983)
- Heritage: Civilization and the Jews (1981 - 1985) Emmy Award
- Opening Night: The Making of an Opera (1980)
- Luciano Pavarotti in Italy (1979)
- The World of James Michener (1977)
- To Communicate is the Beginning (1976)
- To America (1975)
- Princeton: A Search for Answers (1973) Academy Award, Best Documentary Short Subject
- Oceans: The Silent Crisis (1972)
- Art Is... (1971) Academy Award nomination for Documentary Short Subject
- The Other Americans (1969) Emmy Award
- The March (1965)
