= Geritol =

Dietary supplement brand

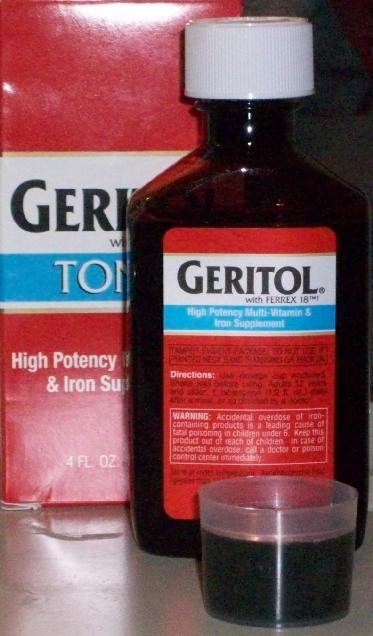
- A four-ounce bottle of Geritol tonic with a child-resistant safety cap
- Product type: Dietary supplement
- Current owner: Viatris
- Country: United States
- Introduced: 1950
- Previous owners: Pharmaceuticals, Inc. J.B. Williams; Beecham Group; SmithKline Beecham; GlaxoSmithKline; Meda Consumer Healthcare (Mylan)
- Website: www.geritol.com

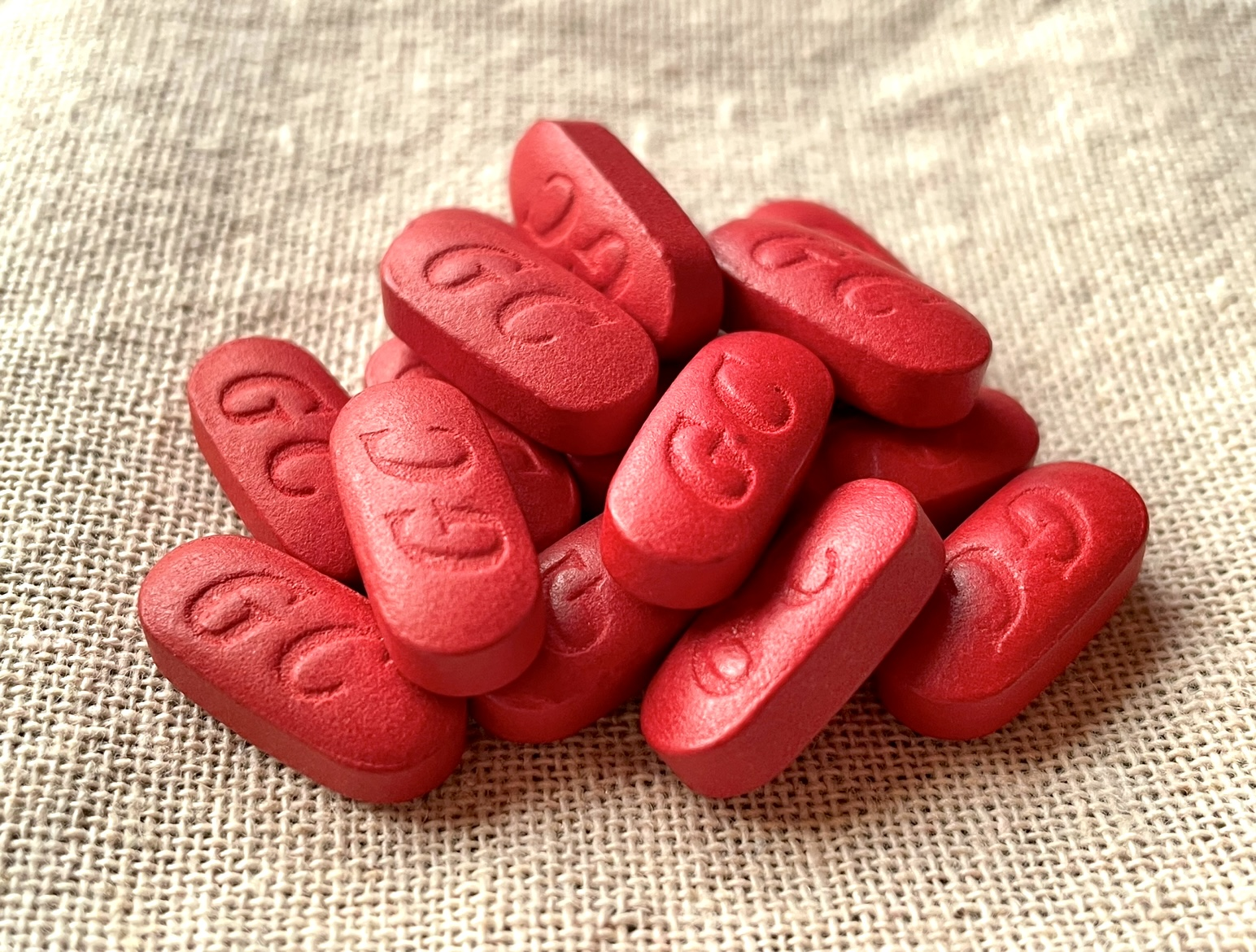
Geritol tablets

Geritol is a United States trademarked name for various dietary supplements, past and present. Geritol is a brand name for several vitamin complexes plus iron or multimineral products in both liquid form and tablets containing from 9.5 to 18 mg of iron per daily dose. The name conveys a connection with aging, as in "geriatric". The product has been promoted from almost the beginning of the mass media era as a cure for "iron-poor tired blood".

== History ==
Geritol was introduced as an alcohol-based, iron and B vitamin tonic by Pharmaceuticals, Inc., in August 1950 and primarily marketed as such into the 1970s. Geritol was folded into Pharmaceuticals' 1957 acquisition of J. B. Williams Co., founded in 1885. J. B. Williams Co. was bought by Nabisco in 1971. In 1982, the Geritol product name was acquired by the multinational pharmaceutical firm Beecham (later GlaxoSmithKline). Geritol was acquired by Meda Pharmaceutical in 2011. Meda was acquired by Mylan in 2016.

The earlier Geritol liquid formulation was advertised as "twice the iron in a pound of calf's liver", and daily doses contained about 50–100 milligrams of iron as ferric ammonium citrate. The Geritol tonic contained about 12% alcohol and some B vitamins.

== Federal Trade Commission investigation ==
Geritol was the subject of years of investigation starting in 1959 by the Federal Trade Commission (FTC). In 1965, the FTC ordered the makers of Geritol to disclose that Geritol would relieve symptoms of tiredness only in persons who suffer from iron deficiency anemia, and that the vast majority of people who experience such symptoms do not have such a deficiency. Geritol's claims were discredited in court findings as "conduct amounted to gross negligence and bordered on recklessness", ruled as a false and misleading claim, and heavily penalized with fines totaling $812,000 (equivalent to $5.89 million in 2025 dollars), the largest FTC fine up to that date (1973). Although subsequent trials and appeals from 1965 to 1973 concluded that some of the FTC demands exceeded its authority, Geritol was already well known and continued to be the largest U.S. company selling iron and B-vitamin supplements through 1979.

A 1976 settlement agreement between J.B. Williams & Co. and the FTC had the company agreeing to pay $125,000 ($707,237 in 2025 dollars).

Since then, supplemental iron products, including Geritol, have been contraindicated because of concerns over hemochromatosis, and serious questions raised in studies for men, postmenopausal women, and nonanemic patients with liver disease, heart disease, type 2 diabetes, or cancer.

== Media sponsorships ==
One of Geritol’s first brand ambassadors was Betty White on The Betty White Show in the 1950s.

In the early days of television, the marketing of Geritol was involved in the quiz show scandal, as the sponsor of Twenty-One. For many years after that, Geritol was largely marketed on television programs that appealed primarily to older viewers, such as The Lawrence Welk Show, What's My Line?, The Red Skelton Show, To Tell the Truth, Hee Haw, and Ted Mack's Original Amateur Hour, as well as Arthur Godfrey's daily show. It was also one of the sponsors of the original Star Trek series.

== In popular culture ==
Geritol is famous for a controversial 1972 television commercial tag line, "My wife, I think I'll keep her." The line was the inspiration for Mary Chapin Carpenter's 1993 song "He Thinks He'll Keep Her".

In the 2001 movie Out Cold, John Majors tells Rick Rambis he will take a Geritol to keep up with Rick on a tour of the mountain.

== See also ==
- Hadacol
