= Twenty-One (game show) =

American quiz show

- Intertitle for the program. From left to right, Charles Van Doren, Jack Barry, and Herb Stempel can be seen in the background, prior to the game that led to the show's cancellation.
- Created by: Jack Barry; Dan Enright; Robert Noah
- Presented by: Jack Barry; Maury Povich
- Country of origin: United States

Production
- Production locations: NBC Studios; New York, New York (1956–1958); NBC Studios; Burbank, California (2000)
- Running time: approx. 22–26 minutes (1956–1958) approx. 44 minutes (2000)
- Production companies: Jack Barry-Dan Enright Productions (1956–1958); The Fred Silverman Company (2000); The Gurin Company (2000); NBC Studios (2000)

Original release
- Network: NBC
- Release: September 12, 1956 – October 16, 1958
- Network: NBC; PAX
- Release: January 9 – May 28, 2000

Twenty-One is an American game show originally hosted by Jack Barry that initially aired on NBC from September 12, 1956 to October 16, 1958. Produced by Jack Barry-Dan Enright Productions, the show featured two contestants playing against each other in separate isolation booths, answering general knowledge questions to earn 21 total points. The program became notorious when it was found to be rigged as part of the 1950s quiz show scandals, which nearly caused the demise of the entire genre in the wake of United States Senate investigations. The 1994 film Quiz Show is based on these events. A new version of the show aired on NBC and PAX from January 9 to May 28, 2000 with Maury Povich as host.

== Gameplay ==
Two contestants, typically a returning champion and a challenger, entered separate isolation booths and donned pairs of headphones. The arrangement of the booths and the studio lighting prevented the contestants from seeing or hearing each other or the audience. At any given moment during the game, one booth would be "open", meaning that the occupant could hear the host in the headphones and could speak using the booth's microphone. The other booth would be "closed", with its microphone disabled and the headphones playing music to prevent the contestant from hearing the game. After each question, sounds of laughter and applause were played through the headphones of the contestant in the closed booth to prevent him or her from learning the outcome of the opponent's turn.

The game was played in rounds, with Barry announcing the category for each round as it was dispensed from a machine on his podium; there were over 100 possible categories. The challenger played first in each round, with their booth open and the champion's closed, and selected a point value from 1 to 11. Higher-value questions were more difficult, and questions often had several parts. If the challenger answered correctly, the points were added to their score; a miss subtracted the points, but the score could never go below zero. The challenger's booth was then closed and the champion's opened so that the champion could take a turn. Barry would not tell either contestant about the other's score or performance.

The goal was to earn a total of 21 points. If the challenger reached this score first, their booth was left open to hear the champion's turn, but the challenger would be cautioned not to speak or give away any information. Barry would not tell the champion that the challenger had already reached 21 unless the champion asked for a question that would tie the score if answered correctly. If the champion failed to match that score, the challenger won. The champion won by reaching 21 first on their turn. If a round ended in a 21–21 tie, the scores were erased and a new game was played. Contestants were given extra time to think about any question that would bring them up to 21.

After two rounds, both booths were opened and the contestants were given a chance to stop the game. If either asked to do so, the contestant in the lead would be declared the winner. The game was automatically stopped after five rounds.

The winner of the game received $500 for each point of the margin of victory (e.g., a 21–15 win paid $3,000). Whenever a game ended in a tie, the stakes were raised by $500 per point and a new game was played. After each victory, the champion could choose to leave the show with all winnings earned up to that point or to play again, basing the decision on a small amount of information about the next challenger. Leaving after a tie game was not permitted. If the champion was defeated, the winnings of the victorious challenger were deducted from their total. Contestants stayed on the show until they either chose to leave or were defeated.

=== 2000 version ===
Questions were still worth 1 to 11 points, but all main-game questions were multiple-choice, with no multiple-part questions. Questions worth six or fewer points had one correct answer out of three choices. Questions worth seven to ten points had one correct answer out of four choices; for ten-point questions, "all/none of the above" was an option. Questions worth 11 points had two correct answers out of five, and both were required. As with the original series, host Povich did not tell either contestant about the other's score or performance.

Incorrect answers no longer deducted points from a contestant's score. Instead, contestants received a strike for each incorrect response (or for failing to provide both correct responses on the 11-point questions); accumulating three strikes resulted in an automatic loss. This rule change meant that games could end without a winner, as the rounds were played to completion. If one contestant had struck out on their turn and the second contestant had two strikes the latter could also lose the game on an incorrect answer. However, a contestant did not know how an opponent had struck out unless explicitly told so by the host.

Each contestant could call for a "Second Chance" once per game, allowing an opportunity to receive help from a friend or family member before answering. An incorrect response on a Second Chance penalized the contestant with two strikes instead of one. If the challenger struck out, and the champion had either one or two strikes and had not yet used their Second Chance, the round was played to completion because the champion could still strike out. In the event of a challenger's strikeout, the champion automatically won if that player had no strikes, or had one strike and had already used the Second Chance.

Games were still played to a maximum of five rounds, and beginning with the second episode, contestants had the option to stop the game after the second round if neither contestant had reached 21. If time ran out during a game and at least two complete rounds had been played, the contestant in the lead was declared the winner and advanced to the Perfect 21 bonus round at the beginning of the next episode.

Unlike the 1950s version, if the game ended in a tie, no new game was played. Instead, the contestants would be asked one question, and the first to ring in could answer. A correct response won the game and the opportunity to play the bonus round; an incorrect answer gave the opponent a chance to respond. If both contestants missed the question, a new one was asked, with play continuing until a winner was determined.

==== Payoff ====
Losing challengers received $1,000 as a consolation prize. Rather than receiving a dollar value multiplied by the point difference after winning each game, champions received progressively larger amounts for each opponent defeated.

Game number	Prize	
Game number	January 2000	February–May 2000
1	$100,000	$25,000
2	$200,000	$50,000
3	$300,000	$100,000
4	$400,000	$250,000
5	N/A	$500,000
6	N/A	$750,000
7	N/A	$1,000,000

All amounts are cumulative; in the first playout structure, winning four games would be worth $1,000,000. After winning a fourth game, the contestant started the chain again at $100,000 for defeating a fifth opponent, $200,000 for defeating a sixth, and so on. After a few early episodes, the number of matches required to win $1,000,000 increased; winning seven games would now be worth at least $2,675,000. As before, any contestant who defeated a seventh opponent started from the beginning of the chain.

When the new prize structure was adopted, the returning champion had won one game and $100,000 in his appearance on the final show under the old one. Instead of being "grandfathered" under that structure, he played and won his second game for $250,000 (the next amount after $100,000), and played but lost his third game for $500,000.

Under both prize structures, champions remained on the show until being defeated, as in the original version. However, unlike the original show, new champions' winnings were not deducted from the totals of dethroned ones.

==== Contestant selection ====
During the first six episodes, the audience chooses the winner's next opponent. The audience would be presented with two potential challengers to face the current champion, and the audience would vote for an opponent using keypads. The person who received the higher vote played against the champion; the other person would be one of the two potential challengers to be voted upon for the next game. In the first episode, there were three potential opponents to face the champion. After the sixth episode, the process was changed to a random selection. At the beginning of the show, six potential challengers would be introduced and would be selected randomly from that group for each new game. People who had not been selected by the end of the show were not guaranteed to return on the following show, although some did appear on the show multiple times before being selected to play.

==== Bonus round: Perfect 21 ====
The champion was asked a maximum of six true/false questions in a single category, starting at one point and increasing by one per question, to a maximum value of six. After any correct answer, the champion could stop playing and receive $10,000 per point; an incorrect answer ended the round and forfeited this money. Correctly answering all six questions won the top prize of $210,000.

=== Big winners ===
Under the first payoff structure, Rahim Oberholtzer was the biggest winner, collecting $1,120,000 (at the time, the all-time game show winnings record) over four victories, three of which were the result of his opponents having struck out.

David Legler won $1,765,000 over six wins with the new payout structure, and was the top winner in American game show history until 2001; as of 2025, he is the 12th-highest winner.

== Broadcast history ==
Twenty-One was originally conceived by host Jack Barry and producing partner Dan Enright as a weekly half-hour program for CBS' 1956–1957 schedule. The show was ultimately picked up by NBC and ran from September 12, 1956, to October 9, 1958, under the sponsorship of Pharmaceuticals, Inc., the makers of Geritol. The series finished at #21 in the Nielsen ratings for the 1957–1958 season. In 1958, Elfrida von Nardroff won $220,500 on the game show Twenty-One, more money than any other contestant on the show. After starting the 1958–59 season with an 8:30 Thursday night time slot, Twenty-One ran on October 2 and on October 9 before being abruptly canceled. An announcement broadcast a few hours before the scheduled October 16 program informed viewers that it would not be seen. A spokesman for Pharmaceuticals said, "Twenty-One was dropped because of a decline in ratings. We must admit that the investigation had something to do with this decline," after the October 9 show had the lowest rating in its history. A prime-time version of Concentration was introduced in the 8:30 time slot on October 30, with Barry as the host and Pharmaceuticals' Geritol as the sponsor.

NBC revived the show in 2000 with talk show host Maury Povich as host, and, like the original version, a live orchestra, after ABC's Who Wants to Be a Millionaire, FOX's Greed, and CBS' Winning Lines proved that big-money game shows had once again become viable prime-time network fare. NBC aired first-run episodes through the end of May sweeps, after which the network declined to renew the series.

=== Scandal ===
The initial broadcast of Twenty-One was played honestly, with no manipulation of the game by the producers. That broadcast was, in the words of Enright, "a dismal failure"; the first two contestants were not successful at answering questions. Show sponsor Geritol, upon seeing this opening-night performance, reportedly became furious with the results and demanded improvements.

As a result, Twenty-One became not only rigged, but almost completely choreographed as well. Contestants were cast almost as if they were actors, and in fact were active and (usually) willing partners in the deception. They were given instructions as to how to dress, what to say to the host and when, which questions to answer correctly or miss, and even when to mop their brows. The producers could shut off the air conditioning to either booth in order to make the contestants sweat more, making them appear to be under great stress.

==== Charles Van Doren ====
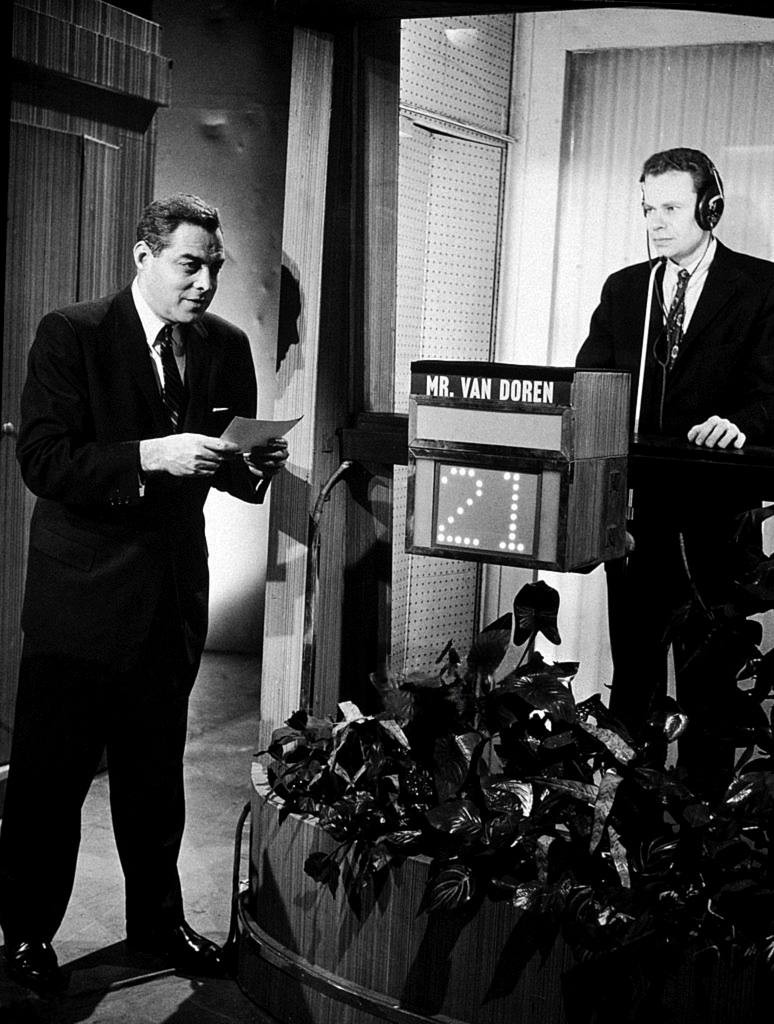
Charles Van Doren in the isolation booth on the quiz show Twenty-One, with host Jack Barry (1957)

College professor Charles Van Doren (1926–2019) was introduced as a contestant on Twenty-One on November 28, 1956, as a challenger to champion Herbert Stempel (1926–2020), a dominant contestant who had become somewhat unpopular with viewers and eventually the sponsor. Van Doren and Stempel played a series of four 21–21 games, with audience interest building with each passing week and each new game, until Van Doren eventually prevailed.

The film Quiz Show depicts the turning point as a question for Stempel, asking him to name the film that won the Academy Award for Best Motion Picture for 1955. Stempel knew the correct answer to be Marty, as it was one of his favorite films. The producers ordered him to answer the question with 1954's Best Motion Picture winner, On the Waterfront. Stempel later recalled that there was a moment in the booth when his conscience and sense of fair play warred with his sense of obligation. He almost disrupted the scripted outcome by giving the correct answer. Stempel answered incorrectly as he was instructed, but redeemed himself by staying in the game and earning enough points to tie Van Doren's score, unlike the depiction of events in Quiz Show. Stempel was finally defeated in the next game. The surviving kinescope of the broadcast shows Stempel failing to come up with the title of William Allen White's August 15, 1896 editorial in the Emporia Gazette titled "What's the Matter with Kansas?" After the missed question, Van Doren quit with 18 points, which was enough to win. Van Doren's victory began one of the longest and most storied runs of any champion in the history of television game shows. His popularity soared as a result of his success, earning him a place on the cover of Time magazine and even a regular feature spot on NBC's Today show; at one point, the program even surpassed CBS' I Love Lucy in the ratings. He was finally unseated as champion by Vivienne Wax Nearing (1926–2007) on March 11, 1957, after having won a total of $129,000.

In the meantime, Stempel, disgruntled over being ordered to lose, attempted to blow the whistle on Twenty-One, even going so far as to have a federal investigator look into the show. Initially, little came of these investigations and Stempel's accusations were dismissed as jealousy because there was no hard evidence to back up his claims. While a congressional investigation did affect Twenty-One during this period, the much larger ongoing investigation was the HUAC hearings into possible communists in entertainment; the show's director, Charles S. Dubin, was fired by NBC in June 1958 after he refused to answer whether he had ever been a member of the Communist Party USA.

In August 1958, the popular CBS daytime game show Dotto was abruptly canceled after a contestant found a notebook containing the answers to every question that was to be asked to the show's current champion, future journalist Marie Winn. Stempel's allegations about Twenty-One began to gain credibility. A grand jury was convened in the autumn of 1958 to investigate Dotto and other possible game-show fixings, investigated by Joseph Stone, the assistant district attorney of New York. Stone said in his book Prime Time and Misdemeanors that question writer Glorianne Rader was instructed by Dan Enright and associate producer Albert Freedman, who had chosen the categories for the next broadcast earlier in the week, to place the questions in Barry's dispensing machine a few minutes before airtime; this was done to avoid any slip-ups in the planned outcome. Stone contacted former Twenty-One contestants, including Richard Jackman, who confessed to the fixing of the show. Three days after Jackman's confession, and without advance public warning, Twenty-One was canceled after its broadcast on October 17, 1958, amid plummeting ratings. A nighttime version of Concentration took over its time slot the following week.

Further eroding Barry and Enright's claims of honesty, another former contestant, James Snodgrass, came forward with corroborating proof that the show had been rigged: using a series of registered letters that he had mailed to himself, Snodgrass documented every answer for which he was coached before airtime. He testified before Congress in 1959.

The scandal forced producers Barry and Enright into virtual exile. Barry did not host another national TV show for more than a decade, and Enright moved to Canada to continue his production career.

==== Aftermath ====
The scandal also caused the Federal Communications Commission to mandate the sale of Barry-Enright's radio station in Hollywood, Florida, WGMA (now WLQY). The station was purchased by its general manager, C. Edward Little, who promptly affiliated the station with the Mutual Broadcasting System. After serving for a time as the head of Mutual's Affiliates Association, Little became the president of Mutual from 1972 to 1979. During this time Little created the Mutual Black Network, the first U.S. broadcast network catering exclusively to African-Americans, in addition to the Mutual Spanish Network and the Mutual Southwest Network. Under Little's administration, Mutual became the first commercial broadcasting entity to use satellite technology for program delivery. During his tenure as head of Mutual, Little hired Larry King to host an all-night phone-in talk show Little had created. King was a one-time announcer for Little at WGMA. King, who had previously hosted a similar morning show on Miami radio station WIOD, went on to national fame on both radio and television, winning a coveted Peabody Award along the way.

Barry would be able to acquire another radio station in the late 1960s: a Los Angeles-area radio station (KKOP 93.5 FM, Redondo Beach, later renamed KFOX, now KDAY). Barry would later say he bought the station specifically because it would require him to have a license from the FCC, and that if the FCC were willing to grant him a license, it would decisively demonstrate that his reputation was no longer "tainted" by the game show scandals. Soon after he acquired KKOP, Barry finally returned to network game-show hosting in 1969, succeeding Dennis Wholey on ABC's The Generation Gap, for which he publicly thanked the producers and ABC for giving him a chance for a comeback. In 1971, he sold ABC his first new game show, The Reel Game, which he also hosted; it ran for 13 weeks. He became a success again as a producer-host with The Joker's Wild, which ran on CBS from 1972 to 1975 and in syndication from 1977–1986 (Barry died in May 1984 and was replaced by Bill Cullen for the final two years); it also saw a revival in syndication for one season in 1990. Enright would work as Joker's executive producer in the show's final year on CBS, and the two revived their partnership full-time in 1976, reviving Tic-Tac-Dough in 1978, which ran until 1986. It was revived once more in 1990 but was canceled after a few months. Enright died in 1992.

=== 1982 pilot ===
An unsold pilot was made in 1982 with Jim Lange as host and Charlie O'Donnell announcing, but it was not picked up. In the pilot, a bonus round was introduced, which consisted of a flashing display showing random numbers between 1 and 11. The contestant would decide whether he or she wanted the number or preferred that the computer take it, with the object of the game to either score 21 exactly first (or be closest to 21 without going over), or get the computer to bust by going over 21. Once the computer hit 17 or more, its score froze for the rest of the game, but this rule did not apply to the contestant. The bonus-round prize was $2,000 and a trip.

== Licensed merchandise ==
A board game based on the original 1956–1958 version was released by Lowell in 1957.

A paperback quiz book featuring 1–11 point questions in each of the 45 categories was released by Pyramid in 1958.

== International versions ==
Twenty-One is one of only three Barry & Enright game shows known to have foreign adaptations, the others being Tic-Tac-Dough and Concentration.

Country	Name	Host	Channel	Year aired
Australia	The Big 9	Athol Guy	Nine Network	1969–1970
Austria	Einundzwanzig	Rudolf Hornegg; Elmar Gunsch	ORF	September 1958 – 1974 late 1980s
Austria	das Quiz 21	Karin Resetarits and Thomas Schuttken	ORF	1998
Brazil	Vinte e Um	Silvio Santos	SBT	2007
Canada (French)	Vingt-et-un	Guy Mongrain	TVA	September 6, 2004 – May 20, 2005
Germany	Hätten Sie's gewußt?	Hans (Heinz) Maegerlein	ARD	June 22, 1958 – 1969
Germany	Quiz Einundzwanzig	Hans Meiser	RTL	July 2000 – September 2, 2002
Poland	Dwadzieścia jeden	? Rafał Rykowski	TVP1	1965–1966; 2000–2002
Sweden	Tjugoett	Karl-Axel Sjöblom; Lennart Hyland; Arne Weise	TV1	1967–1983
Turkey	Yarışma 21	Beyazıt Öztürk	Star TV	2000–2001
United Kingdom	Twenty-One	Chris Howland	ITV	July 3, 1958 – December 23, 1958
United States (original format)	Twenty-One	Jack Barry	NBC; PAX (2000)	September 12, 1956 – October 16, 1958
United States (original format)	Twenty-One	Maury Povich	NBC; PAX (2000)	January 9, 2000 – May 28, 2000

== Episode status ==
Thirty-two episodes are held by the Library of Congress. The episode on which Van Doren defeated Stempel was released as part of a retail home-video compilation featuring other game-show episodes.
