= 1950s quiz show scandals =

Secret collusion between contestants and producers

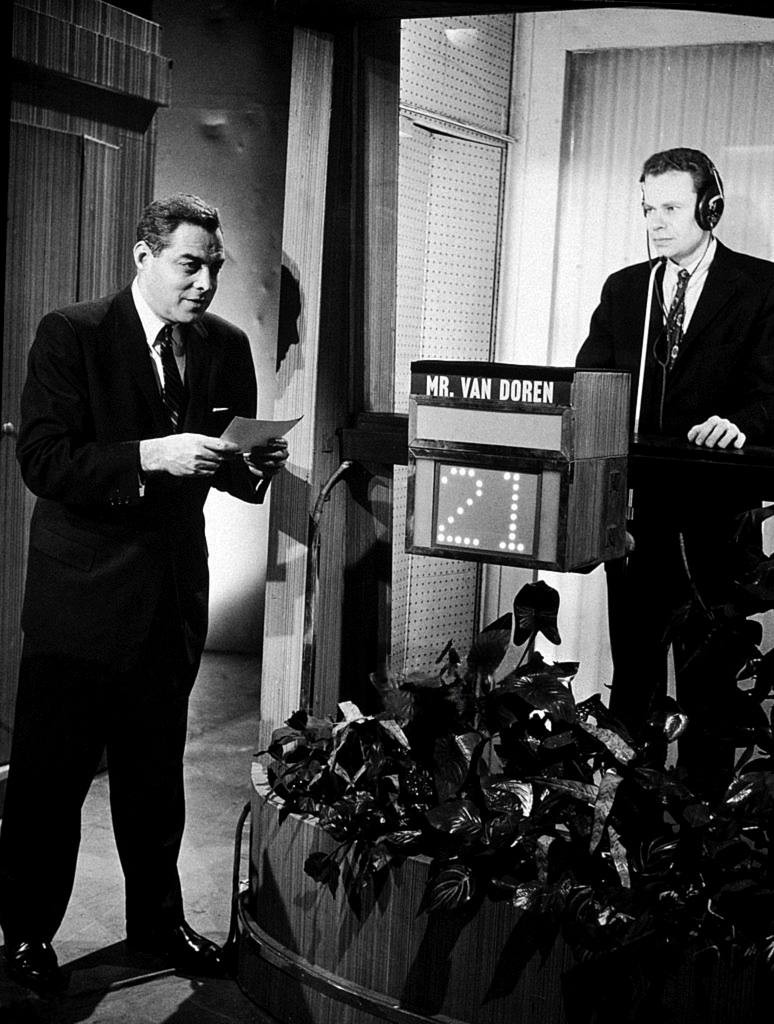
Conspirators in the rigging of Twenty-One, host Jack Barry and contestant Charles Van Doren, on set in June 1957

From 1956 to 1958, numerous quiz shows airing on CBS and NBC, two of the three American TV networks at the time, were revealed to have prearranged outcomes, such as certain contestants winning after being given the answers by producers before filming. These shows had claimed to be objective and fair competitions, and often involved high-stakes money rewards. These revelations shocked the public, and led to numerous changes in television, which was a new and growing medium.

Executives of the networks claimed that, along with the public, they too were victims of the scandals, and that the shows' producers and contestants were responsible. The U.S. Congress investigated the scandals, and amended the Communications Act of 1934 to prohibit TV networks from prearranging the outcomes of quiz shows.

Certain conspirators were not able to work in television ever again. All of the shows involved—including The $64,000 Question and The $64,000 Challenge, The Big Surprise, Dotto, For Love or Money, Tic-Tac-Dough, and Twenty-One—were canceled. The TV quiz show format gained a stigma among the public which only went away after Jeopardy!, a legitimate show, debuted in 1964. It became standard practice for quiz shows' networks and producers to monitor the competitions for cheating. The Twenty-One scandal was portrayed in the 1994 film Quiz Show.

== Background ==
CBS

NBC

From the mid-1950s to the 1980s, there were three commercial broadcast television networks (the "Big Three") in the United States: ABC, CBS, and NBC. All three started out as broadcast radio networks, and by 1948, were broadcasting TV programs to multiple U.S. cities. DuMont Television Network was a fourth broadcaster from 1946 to 1956. In the 1950s, these networks adapted their popular radio programs, such as quiz shows, for the growing TV audience. The radio quiz show Take It or Leave It, for instance, was turned into The $64,000 Question for CBS's TV channel. Competitions between contestants on early radio and TV quiz shows were relatively low-stakes, as the networks did not give out money or other prizes to the winners; the legal matter as to whether these shows would constitute gambling had not been settled. In 1954, the U.S. Supreme Court ruled in FCC v. American Broadcasting Co., Inc. that they did not; if the prize was money, the contestants could not wager their personal funds. Soon, quiz shows involved high-stakes money rewards.

== Scandal ==
=== Twenty-One ===
In September 1956, the game show Twenty-One, hosted by Jack Barry, premiered on NBC. Its first show was played legitimately, with no manipulation of the game by the producers at all. This initial broadcast was, in the words of co-producer Dan Enright, "a dismal failure", as the two contestants were so lacking in the required knowledge that they answered a large number of the questions incorrectly. Further, show sponsor Geritol, upon seeing this opening-night performance, reportedly became furious with the results and said that they did not want to see a repeat performance.

Herb Stempel

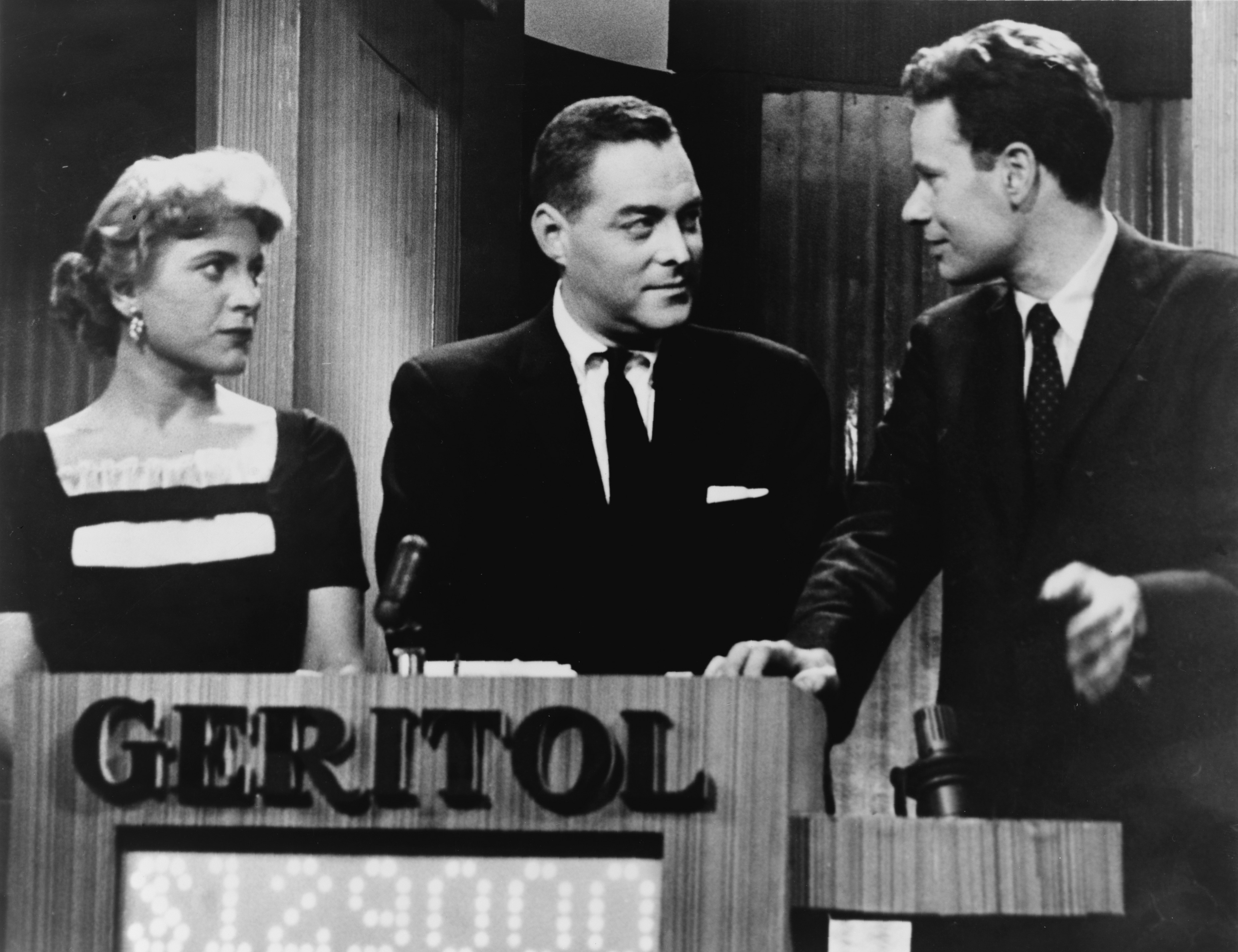
A taping of Twenty-One in March 1957, with Jack Barry (center), and Charles Van Doren (right)

Three months into its run, Twenty-One featured the contestant Herb Stempel. While Stempel was in the midst of his winning streak, both of the $64,000 quiz shows (The $64,000 Question and its spin-off, The $64,000 Challenge) were in the top-ten rated programs, but Twenty-One did not have the same popularity. Enright and his partner, Albert Freedman, were searching for a new champion to replace Stempel to boost ratings. They soon found what they were looking for in Charles Van Doren, an English teacher at Columbia University. Van Doren decided to try out for the NBC quiz show Tic-Tac-Dough. Enright, who produced both Tic-Tac-Dough and Twenty-One, saw his tryout and was familiar with his prestigious family background that included multiple Pulitzer Prize-winning authors and highly respected professors at Columbia. As a result, Enright felt that Van Doren would be perfect as the new face of Twenty-One.

Stempel was then asked to allow his new opponent, Van Doren, to win the game, and Stempel was coached by Enright on how to make it happen. After achieving winnings of $69,500, Stempel's scripted loss to Van Doren occurred on December 5, 1956. One of the questions Stempel answered incorrectly involved the winner of the 1955 Academy Award for Best Motion Picture. The correct answer was Marty, one of Stempel's favorite movies. As instructed by Enright, however, he gave the incorrect answer On the Waterfront, which had won the previous year. Although the manipulation of the contestants helped the producers maintain viewer interest and ratings, the producers had not anticipated the extent of Stempel's resentment at being required to lose the contest against Van Doren.

A year later, Stempel told the New York Journal-American's Jack O'Brian that his winning run as champion on the series had been choreographed and that the show's producer had then ordered him to purposely lose his championship to Van Doren. With no proof, an article was never printed.

James Snodgrass was another contestant on the show who became a whistleblower. He had made lists of all the questions and answers on which he was coached and mailed them to his own home in a series of letters before his games aired. The dates on these letters served as indisputable proof that the show had been rigged, and Snodgrass testified before Congress on this matter in 1959.

=== The Big Surprise ===
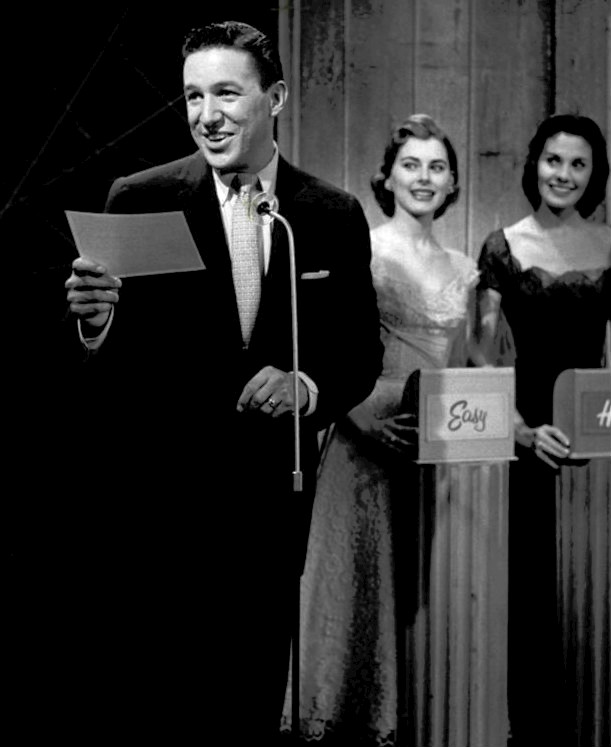
Mike Wallace hosting The Big Surprise in March 1956

In December 1956, Dale Logue, a contestant on NBC's The Big Surprise, filed a lawsuit against the show's production company, Entertainment Productions, Inc., seeking either $103,000 in damages or reinstatement on the show as a contestant. Her claim was that, after being asked a question she did not know the answer to in a "warm-up" session, she was asked the same question again during the televised show. Her assertion was that this was done intentionally with the express purpose of eliminating her as a contestant. At the time Logue's lawsuit was filed, Steve Carlin, executive producer of Entertainment Productions, Inc., called her claim "ridiculous and hopeless". Assertions that Logue had been offered $10,000 to settle in January 1957 were called baseless. Charles Revson, head of Revlon and The Big Surprise's primary sponsor, asked the producers if Logue's accusation was true, and was told that it was not.

=== Dotto ===
In August 1958, Stempel and Logue's credibility was bolstered when Edward Hilgemeier, Jr., a stand-by contestant on the game show Dotto three months earlier, sent an affidavit to the FCC claiming that while backstage, he had found a notebook on set containing the answers contestant Marie Winn was to deliver.

== Backlash ==
In April 1957, Time magazine published an article detailing the depths to which producers manipulated game shows, just short of involving the contestants themselves. In August, Look magazine ran the article "Are TV Quiz Shows Fixed?", which concluded "it may be more accurate to say they are controlled or partially controlled."

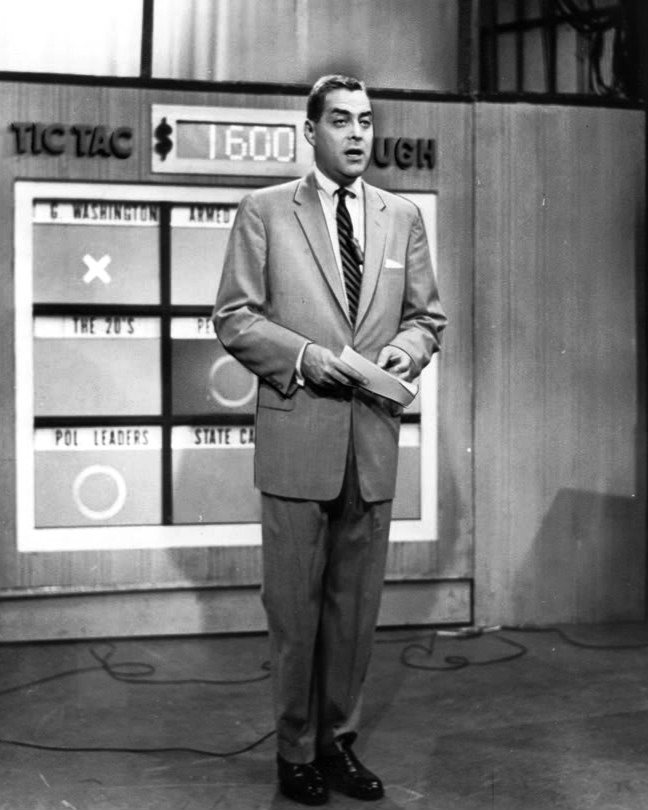
Jack Barry hosting Tic-Tac-Dough in 1957

The American public's reaction was swift and dramatic when the fraud became public; between 87% and 95% knew about the scandals as measured by industry-sponsored polls. Through late 1958 and early 1959, quiz shows implicated by the scandal were quickly canceled. Among them, with their last-aired dates, were:

- The Big Surprise (April 2, 1957)
- Dotto (August 15, 1958)
- The $64,000 Challenge (September 7, 1958)
- Twenty-One (October 16, 1958)
- The $64,000 Question (November 2, 1958)
- Tic-Tac-Dough, prime time edition (December 29, 1958)
- For Love or Money (January 30, 1959)

In late August 1958, New York prosecutor Joseph Stone convened a grand jury to investigate the allegations of the fixing of quiz shows. At the time of the empaneling, neither being a party to a fixed game show nor fixing a game show in the first place were crimes in their own right. Some witnesses in the grand jury acknowledged their role in a fixed show, while others denied it, directly contradicting one another. Many of the coached contestants, who had become celebrities due to their quiz show success, were so afraid of the social repercussions of admitting the fraud that they were unwilling to confess to having been coached, even to the point of perjuring themselves to avoid backlash. Producers who had legally rigged the games to increase ratings, but did not want to implicate themselves, their sponsors, or the networks in doing so, categorically denied the allegations. After the nine-month grand jury, no indictments were handed down and the judge sealed the grand jury report in August 1959. In October 1959, the House Subcommittee on Legislative Oversight, under Representative Oren Harris's chairmanship, began to hold hearings to investigate the scandal. Stempel, Snodgrass, and Hilgemeier all testified.

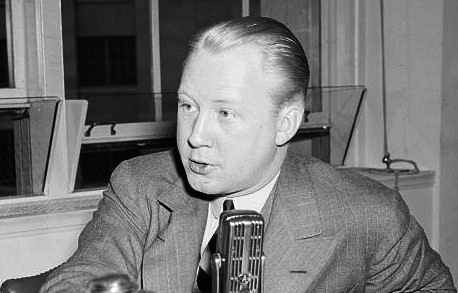
Frank Stanton

The expansion of the probe led CBS president Frank Stanton to immediately announce cancelation of three more of its large-prize quiz shows between October 16 and October 19, 1959: Top Dollar, The Big Payoff, and Name That Tune, explaining that this decision was made "because of the impossibility of guarding against dishonest practice". On November 2 when Van Doren said to the Committee in a nationally televised session:

"I was involved, deeply involved, in a deception. The fact that I, too, was very much deceived cannot keep me from being the principal victim of that deception, because I was its principal symbol."

== Aftermath ==
=== Law and politics ===
All of the regulations regarding television in the late 1950s were defined under the Communications Act of 1934, which dealt with the advertising, fair competition, and labeling of broadcast stations. The act and regulations written by the FCC were indefinite in regard to fixed television programs. Because no specific laws existed regarding fraudulent behavior in quiz shows, it is debatable whether the producers or contestants did anything illegal. Instead, one inference could be that the medium was ill-used. After concluding the Harris Commission investigation, Congress amended the Communications Act to prohibit the fixing of televised contests of intellectual knowledge or skill.

U.S. president Dwight D. Eisenhower signed the bill into law on September 13, 1960. The legislation allowed the FCC to require license renewals of less than the legally required three years if the agency believed it would be in the public interest; prohibited gifts to FCC members, and declared illegal any contest or game with intent to deceive the audience.

=== Contestants ===
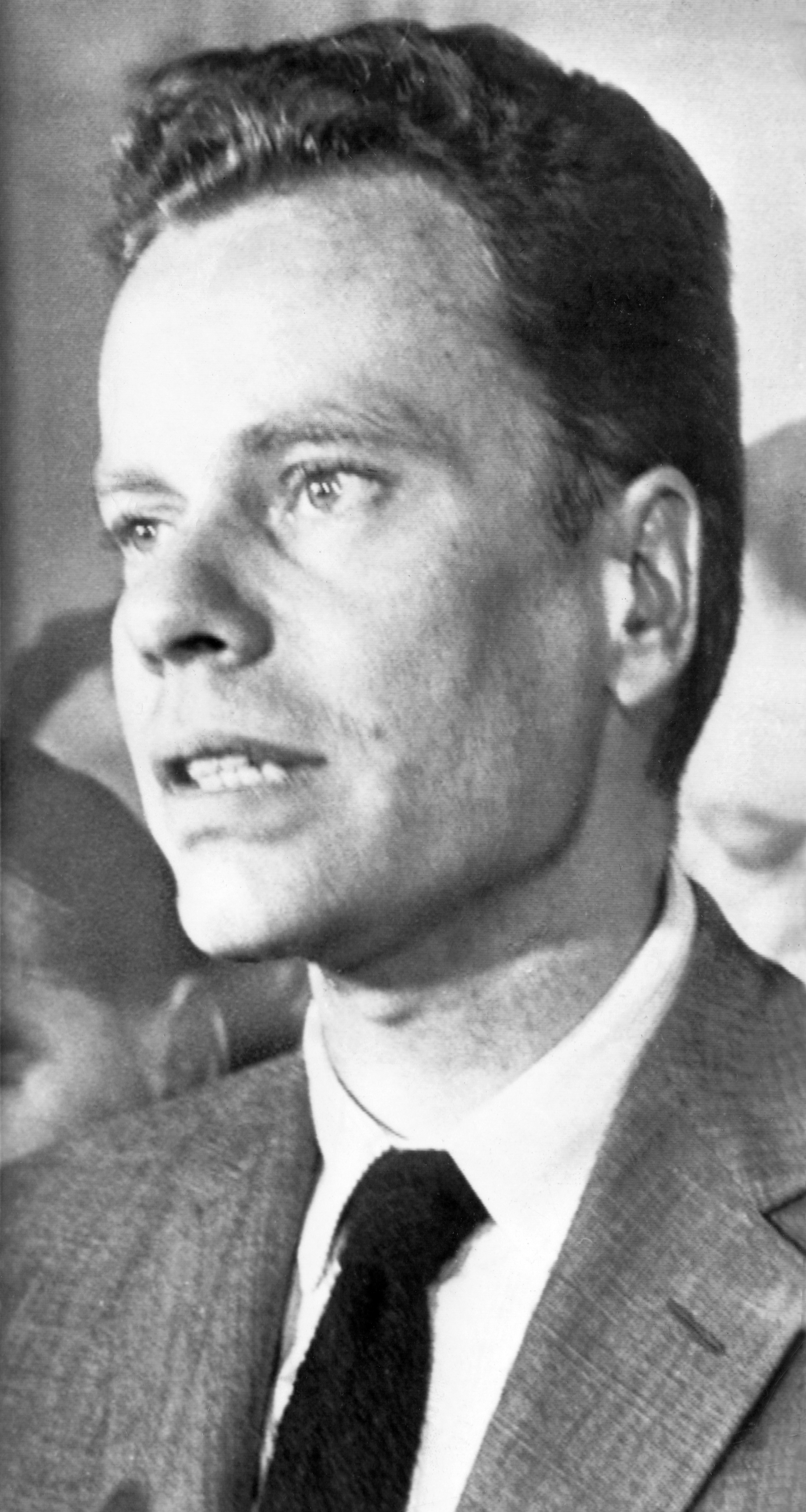
Charles Van Doren

Charles Van Doren, who had become a regular on NBC's Today, lost his job in the television industry. He was also forced to resign his professorship at Columbia University. Van Doren took a job as an editor at Encyclopædia Britannica and continued working as an editor and writer until his retirement in 1982. He refused requests for interviews for more than three decades and chose not to participate in the production of The Quiz Show Scandal, a 1992 one-hour documentary aired on PBS. He later (after discussing the matter with family members, who, with the exception of his son John, were against his participation) turned down an offer of $100,000 to act as a consultant on the 1994 feature film Quiz Show directed by Robert Redford (on which Stempel was a consultant). In 2008, Van Doren broke his silence, describing his quiz show experience in an essay-length memoir published in The New Yorker.

Teddy Nadler, whose $264,000 haul on The $64,000 Challenge stood as a record for two decades, resorted to applying for a temporary job with the United States Census Bureau when his prize money started running short but failed the civil service exam. In 1970, producers exonerated Nadler, stating that they had shown him questions beforehand but that he already knew the answers and did not need them given to him.

=== Hosts and producers ===
In September 1958, a New York grand jury called producers who had coached contestants to appear in testimony. A prosecutor on the case later estimated that of the 150 sworn witnesses before the panel, only 50 told the truth.

Other producers met the same fate as Barry and Enright but, unlike them, could not redeem themselves afterwards. One of the more notable is Frank Cooper, whose Dotto ended up being his longest-running and most popular game creation. The other of the more notable is Entertainment Productions, Inc. (EPI) (originally Louis G. Cowan, Inc.), who produced such hits like The $64,000 Question and The Big Surprise. Hosts such as Jack Narz and Hal March continued to work on television after the scandals. Narz, who passed a lie-detector test at the time of the Dotto affair, had an extensive career as a game-show host after the incident (which also allowed him to help his brother, James, who later took on the name Tom Kennedy, break into the television business.) Sonny Fox, the original host of The $64,000 Challenge, left long before it could become tainted and became a popular children's television host, most notably of Wonderama. Fox later stated that his unintentional "predilection for asking the answers" was a factor in his decision to only rarely host game shows after the scandals.

=== Television ===
The quiz-show scandals exhibited the necessity for stronger network control over programming and production. Quiz-show scandals also justified and accelerated the growth of the networks' power over television advertisers concerning licensing, scheduling, and sponsorship of programs. The networks claimed to be ignorant, and victims of the scandals. The NBC president at the time stated, "NBC was just as much a victim of the quiz-show frauds as was the public."

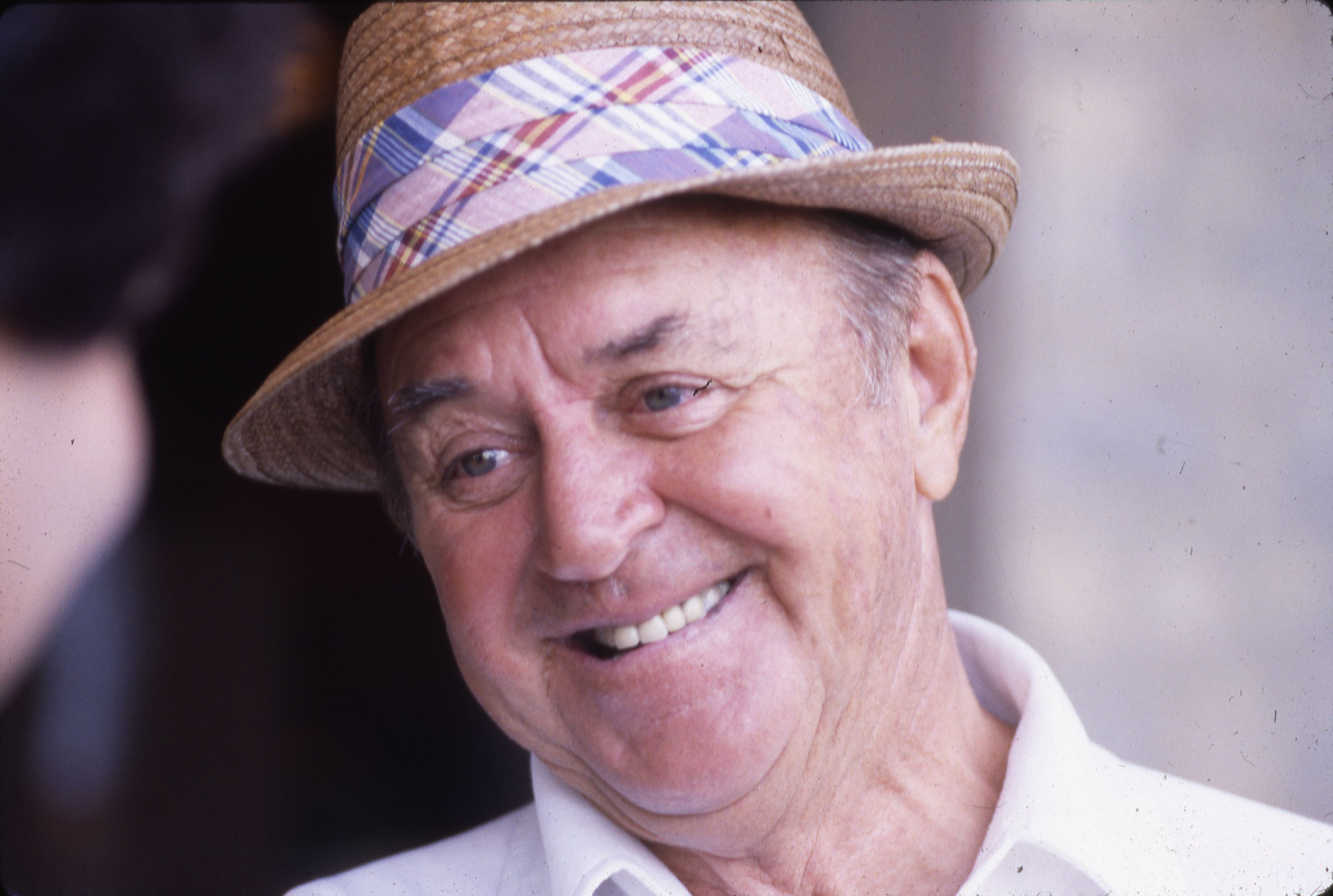
Sam Snead

The first sign of the new enforcement came when American Safety Razor Company pulled its sponsorship of NBC's World Championship Golf match play series in April 1960 after a December 1959 taping of the match play tournament featured Sam Snead against Mason Rudolph. With the match tied on the 12th hole, Snead discovered a 15th club in his bag in violation of the Rules of Golf, which is a loss of hole penalty for each hole the extra club was in the bag. By rule, the violation made Rudolph the legal match winner, 11 and 7. Snead instead hid the violation and played the remainder of the match, letting Rudolph finish ahead after a full 18 holes, to avoid "spoiling the show". While the legality of the outcome was unaffected, Snead drew criticism for what amounted to recreating and misrepresenting the end of the match. The rule was changed in 1964 by capping the number of penalties for this violation to two, after which Snead would have been informed of the violation, changing the score automatically to Rudolph 2 up, with the seven holes remaining under the new rule, which is still in use.

The audio and/or visual disclaimer "Portions of the program not affecting the outcome of the game have been edited and/or recreated" is often posted on game shows when scenes are reshot, and the host's reading of a question may be re-recorded after the fact. On Wheel of Fortune, three consecutive turns that are Lose a Turn, Bankrupt (without any money or prizes by the affected player), or letter called out that was not on the board, may be edited out, as might a Final Spin that lands on a penalty space. On The Price Is Right, all four players overbidding on a One Bid, unsuccessful number draws in 3 Strikes, excessive time wasting during a pricing game, or a No Spin violation in the Showcase Showdown may be edited out. Irregularities during questions on many game shows may result in editing out or replacing those questions (and will be posted during the post-production credits).

Networks also curtailed the large prizes 1950s quiz shows handed out by setting strict limits on how much a contestant could win during their time on a game show, with the cash value of physical prizes won also counting against the cap. ABC capped total winnings on its game shows at $20,000, CBS had a $25,000 limit, while NBC allowed the producers of individual shows to set their own "reasonable" winnings caps. Standards and practices departments typically required winners to donate any money won over the limit to charity. Repeat winners could also only appear on a maximum number of shows or games (for instance, the original NBC run of Jeopardy! would automatically retire champions after winning five consecutive games, while CBS' Password instituted a one-match-per-contestant limit after several contestants won more than $1,000 on one early primetime show). These limits would eventually be removed or lessened as the memory of the scandal faded, inflation increased the monetary value of common prizes such as cars or vacation packages, and producers saw that a repeat champion's run could increase ratings. The last network to institute a winnings limit was CBS, who would abandon its policy (which had eventually increased to $125,000 per contestant) in 2006.

A big-money quiz show did not return until ABC premiered 100 Grand in 1963. It went off the air after three shows, never awarding its top prize. Quiz shows still held a stigma throughout much of the 1960s, which was eventually eased by the success of the lower-stakes and fully legitimate answer-and-question game Jeopardy! upon its launch in 1964. Jeopardy! distinguished itself with a viewer-friendly format that offers "accessible clues and manageable categories" that the typical viewer has a realistic chance of being able to answer. The biggest winner across the 11-year original NBC run of Jeopardy!, Burns Cameron, won only $11,800 in his playing career—$7,070 in his five days, an additional $4,040 from his Tournament of Champions win, and a $700 prize in the all-star 2,000th episode—a full order of magnitude less than the 1950s quiz shows at their peak. Later incarnations of Jeopardy! substantially raised money values and removed limits on winning streaks; if Cameron's five-day run was on the modern syndicated Jeopardy!, he would have won at least $141,400.

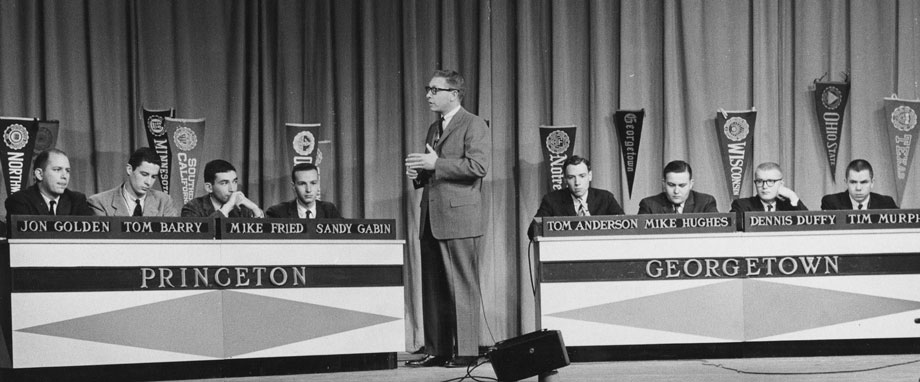
Allen Ludden hosting a College Bowl game between Princeton and Georgetown University in 1959

The other quiz show with a sustained run during the post-scandal era of the 1960s was GE College Bowl, in which college students competed on behalf of their universities. Competing teams were limited to five appearances, and all winnings were placed in a scholarship trust.

Barry and Enright eventually found a loophole in limits the networks imposed on winnings by selling shows directly into syndication, a business model the Federal Communications Commission was actively encouraging in the 1970s by way of rules such as the Prime Time Access Rule and Financial Interest and Syndication Rules. Its revival of Tic-Tac-Dough would regularly produce "six to eight" winners each year who netted more than the networks' limits, including one, Thom McKee, who would surpass Nadler's winnings with a total payday of $312,700 over a 46-episode run. Barry and Enright eventually brought its winnings limits into line with the networks' so that they could sell the programs to network owned-and-operated stations, particularly CBS Television Stations, who had shown interest in buying the show only if the producers would adhere to CBS network standards. CBS would tighten its restrictions further in 1984 following an incident when Michael Larson memorized and gamed the board on Press Your Luck to win over $100,000; CBS initially suspected Larson, who had a long history of con jobs and scams, had somehow cheated, before finding that he had won legitimately.

== See also ==
- 1951 college basketball point-shaving scandal, another scandal investigated by Frank Hogan
- 2007 British television phone-in scandal
- American game show winnings records
- Martin Flood, who was accused of cheating on the Australian version of Who Wants to Be a Millionaire?
- Charles Ingram, who cheated on the British Who Wants to Be a Millionaire?
  - R v Ingram, C., Ingram, D. and Whittock, T., the associated court case.
- Slumdog Millionaire, a fiction movie about a man accused of cheating on the Indian Who Wants to Be a Millionaire?
- Jay Jackson
- Manhunt (2001) and Our Little Genius (2010), later game shows that were pulled due to manipulation

== External sources ==
- PBS Article on Radio Quiz Shows
- The Quiz Show Scandal
- Walter Karp: The Quiz-Show Scandal, in American Heritage, May/June 1989
