= Merrill Heatter =

American screenwriter and producer

- Born: Merrill Gabriel Heatter; December 16, 1925; New York City, U.S.
- Died: October 8, 2017 (aged 91); Beverly Hills, California, U.S.
- Occupations: Producer; writer
- Years active: 1947–2009
- Spouse: Elaine Stewart (m. 1964; died 2011)
- Children: 2
- Relatives: Gabriel Heatter (uncle); Maida Heatter (cousin)

Merrill Gabriel Heatter (December 16, 1925 – October 8, 2017) was an American television producer and writer. He was best known for his collaboration with writer Bob Quigley for over 20 years and the formation of their production company Heatter-Quigley Productions in 1959. The company was responsible for the game shows Hollywood Squares and Gambit and the animated television series Wacky Races.

He also formed Merrill Heatter Productions in 1981, which is responsible for the Gambit-based show Catch 21.

== Early life ==
Heatter was born in New York City, the son of Frances and Edward Heatter. His paternal grandparents were Jewish immigrants from Austria. Heatter was the nephew of journalist Gabriel Heatter and the cousin of cook Maida Heatter.

== Career ==
=== Beginnings ===
Heatter's career began in the late 1940s when, on July 7, 1947, CBS Radio and writer Goodman Ace launched the historical educational program You Are There. The format of the series was to present important events from history to the viewer as if the viewer were listening to an actual news broadcast. The series aired its last radio broadcast on March 19, 1950.

On February 1, 1953, the series made a transition to CBS television. The series starred Walter Cronkite of CBS News with several field reporters including radio announcing veterans Dick Joy and Harlow Wilcox. Heatter was one of the head writers of the series. The series' last telecast was on October 13, 1957.

Later he worked on the game show On Your Account for Procter & Gamble, of which he met Bob Quigley, and he worked for Louis Cowan's Entertainment Productions, and Heatter worked on television series like The Big Surprise and Top Dollar, before the formation of Heatter-Quigley.

=== Heatter-Quigley Productions ===
==== Background ====
In the 1950s, Heatter met Bob Quigley, while working on the show On Your Account. Quigley was a former writer for comedian and pianist Victor Borge. Quigley had met Kenny Williams, as Quigley was a producer for the television show County Fair. Shortly after the two met, in 1959 they decided to form Heatter-Quigley Productions specifically to produce game shows.

==== Quiz show scandals and early game shows ====
The first game show the two created was entitled Video Village. The series premiered on CBS on July 1, 1960. Video Village was one of the first new game shows produced after the infamous quiz show scandals. The quiz show scandals were a series of revelations that contestants of several popular television quiz shows were secretly given assistance by the show's producers to arrange the outcome of a supposedly fair competition which took place between 1956 and 1958.

The scandals first arose in 1956. That year, the Jack Barry-hosted game show Twenty One featured a contestant, Herb Stempel, coached by producer Dan Enright to allow his opponent to win the game. The matter was brought into focus in 1958 when Enright was revealed to have rigged the show; this revelation caused networks to cancel their entire lineups of quiz shows.

The quiz shows scandals came to an end in 1958 after three popular game shows were cancelled. Those game shows were Twenty One on October 16, The $64,000 Question on November 2 and Dotto on August 15. They were the most publicized of all the shows involved in the scandals.

Heatter and Quigley took the chance and aired Video Village with Jack Narz as the original host (Narz also served as the host of Dotto during the scandals). Narz was replaced by future Let's Make a Deal host Monty Hall in September 1960. The series was well known for its gigantic life-sized game board which was the set of the show. The series ended its run in 1962. During the success, the duo entered into a partnership with television producer Four Star Television to produce television programs before they broke up in 1966 amidst the death of company founder Dick Powell.

Heatter and Quigley created and produced several unsuccessful game shows before their breakthrough hit Hollywood Squares premiered. Some of those shows included People Will Talk, which ran for six months on NBC in 1963, Shenanigans, which ran on ABC for one season, and PDQ, which ran in syndication for three seasons.

==== Hollywood Squares ====
Sometime after the premiere of Shenanigans, Heatter and Quigley decided to create a panel game show. The game show, which would be called Hollywood Squares, was a televised quiz show version of tic-tac-toe.

A pilot episode of the series was taped at CBS Television City and aired on April 21, 1965. The pilot featured Bert Parks of Break the Bank fame as the host. The pilot also featured future HS regulars Rose Marie and Charley Weaver with Jim Backus in the center square.

Shortly after the taping of the pilot episode, after some reworking of the CBS pilot, NBC taped a second pilot episode of the game show, with Peter Marshall as the host and aired it on October 17, 1966. The Marshall-hosted pilot became the official first episode of the game show. NBC aired Hollywood Squares' final episode on June 20, 1980. The series continued to air in syndication until September 11, 1981.

Several spinoffs and revival series aired over the next 25 years. The spinoffs included Storybook Squares, Match Game-Hollywood Squares Hour and Hip Hop Squares. There was also a 1986 revival and a 1998 revival of the series.

==== Acquisition by Filmways ====
In 1969, Heatter and Quigley sold their company to Filmways. The company still continued to operate with Filmways as the owner.

==== Gambit and other game shows ====
As the 1970s rolled around, Heatter and Quigley were still at work on producing their existing game show, Hollywood Squares, and creating new game shows.

On September 4, 1972, CBS premiered the new game show Gambit. The series was the first new game show of the 1970s produced by Heatter-Quigley. The show was based on the card game blackjack. The series starred Wink Martindale as the presenter and Elaine Stewart as the card dealer. The series was filmed at Television City. The series ended on December 10, 1976. A spin-off series entitled Las Vegas Gambit aired on NBC during the 1980–81 television season.

Some of the other game shows that Heatter-Quigley produced included Baffle, High Rollers, and The Magnificent Marble Machine. Las Vegas Gambit was the last title produced by Heatter-Quigley before it was dissolved in June 1981. Bob Quigley retired from show business shortly after Las Vegas Gambit went off the air.

=== Merrill Heatter Productions ===
Heatter went on to produce several more game shows solo under the company Merrill Heatter Productions, which was formed as an independent entity. Most of those game shows were revivals or new versions of Heatter-Quigley produced shows. Some of those shows included Battlestars, All-Star Blitz, Bargain Hunters and the 1987 version of High Rollers (with Orion Pictures subsidiary Century Towers Productions (who owns the title rights to the pre-1981 Heatter game shows)). The last game show that Merrill Heatter Productions produced in the 20th century ended in 1990. On September 28, 1999, Heatter leased the worldwide rights to his solo-developed game shows to King World (now CBS Media Ventures). They now own the rights to those game shows.

On July 28, 2008, Game Show Network premiered a new game show created by Heatter entitled Catch 21. The show was the first game show Heatter created in 19 years. The series was a revival of Heatter's successful 1970s game show Gambit. He created the series along with Scott Sternberg.

== Personal life ==
Heatter married actress and model Elaine Stewart on December 31, 1964. Stewart was known for her roles in the movies The Adventures of Hajji Baba and Night Passage. She was also known for her guest appearances on the television shows Bat Masterson, Burke's Law and Perry Mason. Stewart also was the hostess for two Heatter-Quigley shows, Gambit and High Rollers. Stewart was previously married to actor Bill Carter. Heatter and Stewart had two children, Stewart Heatter and Gabrielle Heatter. They were married until Stewart's death on June 27, 2011.

== Death ==
Heatter died in Beverly Hills, California on October 8, 2017, after a short battle with cancer.

== Filmography ==
=== Heatter-Quigley Productions ===
- Video Village/Video Village, Jr. (1960–1962)
- Double Exposure (1961)
- People Will Talk (1963)
- The Celebrity Game (1964)
- Shenanigans (1964–1965)
- PDQ (1965–1969)
- Showdown (1966)
- Hollywood Squares/Storybook Squares (1966–1981 version)
- Temptation (1967–1968)
- Funny You Should Ask (1968–1969)
- Wacky Races (1968–1970, co-produced with Hanna-Barbera Productions, rights owned by Hanna-Barbera Cartoons and Warner Bros. Animation; the only non-game show produced by the company, although it was intended to have a game show element)
- Name Droppers (1969)
- Gambit (1972–1976)
- Runaround (1972–1973)
- Amateur's Guide to Love (1972)
- Baffle (1973), a revival of PDQ.
- All-Star Baffle (1974), Baffle with no "civilian" contestants.
- High Rollers (1974–1976; 1978–1980)
- The Magnificent Marble Machine (1975–1976)
- Hot Seat (1976)
- To Say the Least (1977–1978)
- Bedtime Stories (1979)
- Las Vegas Gambit (1980–1981)

=== Merrill Heatter Productions ===
- Battlestars (1981–1982)
- Fantasy (1982–1983) (co-produced by Earl Greenberg Productions and Columbia Pictures Television)
- The New Battlestars (1983)
- All-Star Blitz (1985) (co-produced by Peter Marshall Enterprises)
- Bargain Hunters (1987) (co-produced by Josephson Communications, Inc.)
- High Rollers (1987–1988) (co-produced by Century Towers Productions and syndicated by Orion Television Syndication)
- The Last Word (1989–1990) (syndicated by Turner Program Services)
- Catch 21 (2008–2011) (co-produced by Scott Sternberg Productions)

== Awards and nominations ==
Heatter has received three Primetime Emmy Award nominations and six nominations for the Daytime Emmy Award. He has also won four Daytime Emmy Awards.

Year	Award	Category	Work	Result
1969	Primetime Emmy Award	Outstanding Achievement in Daytime Programming	Hollywood Squares	Nominated
1972	Primetime Emmy Award	Outstanding Achievement in Daytime Programming	Hollywood Squares	Nominated
1973	Primetime Emmy Award	Outstanding Program Achievement in Daytime	Hollywood Squares	Nominated
1974	Daytime Emmy Award	Outstanding Game/Audience Participation Show	Hollywood Squares	Nominated
1975	Daytime Emmy Award	Outstanding Game/Audience Participation Show	Hollywood Squares	Won
1976	Daytime Emmy Award	Outstanding Game/Audience Participation Show	Hollywood Squares	Nominated
1977	Daytime Emmy Award	Outstanding Game/Audience Participation Show	Hollywood Squares	Nominated
1978	Daytime Emmy Award	Outstanding Game/Audience Participation Show	Hollywood Squares	Won
1979	Daytime Emmy Award	Outstanding Game/Audience Participation Show	Hollywood Squares	Won
1980	Daytime Emmy Award	Outstanding Game/Audience Participation Show	Hollywood Squares	Won
1981	Daytime Emmy Award	Outstanding Game/Audience Participation Show	Hollywood Squares	Nominated
1983	Daytime Emmy Award	Outstanding Variety Series	Fantasy	Nominated
1984	Daytime Emmy Award	Outstanding Variety Series	Fantasy	Nominated
