= 1975–76 United States network television schedule (daytime) =

The following is the 1975–76 daytime network television schedule for the three major English-language commercial broadcast networks in the United States. It covers the weekday and weekend daytime hours from September 1975 to August 1976.

The Public Broadcasting Service was in operation, but the schedule was set by each local station.

In 1975, several daily soap operas expanded from 30 minutes to 60 minutes. Game shows also remained a popular format in daytime programming.

== Notation ==
Talk shows are highlighted in yellow, local programming is white, reruns of older programming are orange, game shows are pink, soap operas are chartreuse, news programs are gold, children's programs are light purple and sports programs are light blue. New series are highlighted in bold.

== Monday–Friday ==
Network		6:00 am	6:30 am	7:00 am	7:30 am	8:00 am	8:30 am	9:00 am	9:30 am	10:00 am	10:30 am	11:00 am	11:30 am	noon	12:30 pm	1:00 pm	1:30 pm	2:00 pm	2:30 pm	3:00 pm	3:15 pm	3:30 pm	4:00 pm	4:30 pm	5:00 pm	5:30 pm	6:00 pm	6:30 pm
ABC	Fall	Local/syndicated programming		AM America				Local/syndicated programming					**Happy Days** reruns	Showoffs	All My Children	Ryan's Hope	Let's Make a Deal	The $10,000 Pyramid	Rhyme and Reason	General Hospital		One Life to Live	You Don't Say!	Local/syndicated programming			ABC Evening News	Local/syndicated programming
ABC	November	Local/syndicated programming		**Good Morning America**				Local/syndicated programming					**Happy Days** reruns	Showoffs	All My Children	Ryan's Hope	Let's Make a Deal	The $10,000 Pyramid	Rhyme and Reason	General Hospital		One Life to Live	You Don't Say!	Local/syndicated programming			ABC Evening News	Local/syndicated programming
ABC	December	Local/syndicated programming		**Good Morning America**				Local/syndicated programming					**Happy Days** reruns	Showoffs	All My Children	Ryan's Hope	Let's Make a Deal	The $10,000 Pyramid	Rhyme and Reason	General Hospital		One Life to Live	**The Edge of Night**	Local/syndicated programming			ABC Evening News	Local/syndicated programming
ABC	Late December	Local/syndicated programming		**Good Morning America**				Local/syndicated programming					**Happy Days** reruns	Let's Make a Deal	All My Children	Ryan's Hope	Rhyme and Reason	The $10,000 Pyramid	**The Neighbors**	General Hospital		One Life to Live	**The Edge of Night**	Local/syndicated programming			ABC Evening News	Local/syndicated programming
ABC	January	Local/syndicated programming		**Good Morning America**				Local/syndicated programming					**Happy Days** reruns	Let's Make a Deal	All My Children	Ryan's Hope	Rhyme and Reason	**The $20,000 Pyramid**	**The Neighbors**	General Hospital		One Life to Live	**The Edge of Night**	Local/syndicated programming			ABC Evening News	Local/syndicated programming
ABC	Spring	Local/syndicated programming		**Good Morning America**				Local/syndicated programming					**Happy Days** reruns	Let's Make a Deal	All My Children	Ryan's Hope	Rhyme and Reason	**The $20,000 Pyramid**	**Break the Bank**	General Hospital		One Life to Live	**The Edge of Night**	Local/syndicated programming			ABC Evening News	Local/syndicated programming
ABC	Early July	Local/syndicated programming		**Good Morning America**				Local/syndicated programming					**Happy Days** reruns	**Hot Seat**	All My Children	Ryan's Hope	**Family Feud**	**The $20,000 Pyramid**	**Break the Bank**	General Hospital		One Life to Live	**The Edge of Night**	Local/syndicated programming			ABC Evening News	Local/syndicated programming
ABC	Late July	Local/syndicated programming		**Good Morning America**				Local/syndicated programming					**Happy Days** reruns	**Hot Seat**	All My Children	Ryan's Hope	**Family Feud**	**The $20,000 Pyramid**	One Life to Live		General Hospital		**The Edge of Night**	Local/syndicated programming			ABC Evening News	Local/syndicated programming
CBS	Fall	Sunrise Semester	Local/syndicated programming	CBS Morning News		Captain Kangaroo		Local/syndicated programming		**Give-n-Take**	The Price Is Right	Gambit	Love of Life; 11:55 am: CBS Midday News	The Young and the Restless	Search for Tomorrow	Local/syndicated programming	As the World Turns	(The) Guiding Light	The Edge of Night	Match Game '75		Tattletales	Musical Chairs	Local/syndicated programming				CBS Evening News
CBS	November	Sunrise Semester	Local/syndicated programming	CBS Morning News		Captain Kangaroo		Local/syndicated programming		The Price Is Right		Gambit	Love of Life; 11:55 am: CBS Midday News	The Young and the Restless	Search for Tomorrow	Local/syndicated programming	As the World Turns	(The) Guiding Light	The Edge of Night	Match Game '75		Tattletales	Give-n-Take	Local/syndicated programming				CBS Evening News
CBS	Winter	Sunrise Semester	Local/syndicated programming	CBS Morning News		Captain Kangaroo		Local/syndicated programming		The Price Is Right		Gambit	Love of Life; 11:55 am: CBS Midday News	The Young and the Restless	Search for Tomorrow	Local/syndicated programming	As the World Turns		Guiding Light	**All in the Family** reruns		Match Game '76	Tattletales	Local/syndicated programming				CBS Evening News
NBC	Fall	Local/syndicated programming		Today				Local/syndicated programming		Celebrity Sweepstakes	Wheel of Fortune	High Rollers	The Hollywood Squares	The Magnificent Marble Machine	Jackpot; 12:55 pm: NBC News Update	Local/syndicated programming	Days of Our Lives		The Doctors	Another World			Somerset	Local/syndicated programming				NBC Nightly News
NBC	Late September	Local/syndicated programming		Today				Local/syndicated programming		Celebrity Sweepstakes	Wheel of Fortune	High Rollers	The Hollywood Squares	The Magnificent Marble Machine	**Three for the Money**; 12:55 pm: NBC News Update	Local/syndicated programming	Days of Our Lives		The Doctors	Another World			Somerset	Local/syndicated programming				NBC Nightly News
NBC	December	Local/syndicated programming		Today				Local/syndicated programming		Celebrity Sweepstakes	Wheel of Fortune		The Hollywood Squares	High Rollers	The Magnificent Marble Machine; 12:55 pm: NBC News Update	Local/syndicated programming	Days of Our Lives		The Doctors	Another World			Somerset	Local/syndicated programming				NBC Nightly News
NBC	Early January	Local/syndicated programming		Today				Local/syndicated programming		Celebrity Sweepstakes	Wheel of Fortune		The Hollywood Squares	High Rollers	**Take My Advice**; 12:55 pm: NBC News Update	Local/syndicated programming	Days of Our Lives		The Doctors	Another World			Somerset	Local/syndicated programming				NBC Nightly News
NBC	Mid January	Local/syndicated programming		Today				Local/syndicated programming		Celebrity Sweepstakes	High Rollers	Wheel of Fortune	The Hollywood Squares	The Magnificent Marble Machine	**Take My Advice**; 12:55 pm: NBC News Update	Local/syndicated programming	Days of Our Lives		The Doctors	Another World			Somerset	Local/syndicated programming				NBC Nightly News
NBC	Spring	Local/syndicated programming		Today				Local/syndicated programming		Celebrity Sweepstakes	High Rollers	Wheel of Fortune	The Hollywood Squares	The Magnificent Marble Machine reruns	**Take My Advice**; 12:55 pm: NBC News Update	Local/syndicated programming	Days of Our Lives		The Doctors	Another World			Somerset	Local/syndicated programming				NBC Nightly News
NBC	Summer	Local/syndicated programming		Today				Local/syndicated programming		**Sanford and Son** reruns	Celebrity Sweepstakes	Wheel of Fortune	The Hollywood Squares	**The Fun Factory**	**The Gong Show**; 12:55 pm: NBC News Update	Local/syndicated programming	Days of Our Lives		The Doctors	Another World			Somerset	Local/syndicated programming				NBC Nightly News

=== Notes ===
- On ABC, ABC Evening News was produced at 6:00 PM Eastern/5:00 PM Central, and aired live by some affiliates. This early feed of the broadcast was discontinued in 1982.
- The Edge of Night aired its final CBS broadcast on November 28, 1975. The serial moved to ABC on December 1, 1975 with a 90 minute episode; Although it aired in the 4PM (ET)/3PM (CT) timeslot, affiliates were allowed to air the program outside the scheduled timeslot, while affiliates in the Pacific Time Zone had a 12 Noon feed for the series.
- In the Pacific Time Zone (from December 1975 to March 1977), ABC's lineup had its game shows aired in the morning, while the 12 Noon to 3 PM block featured The Edge of Night, Ryan's Hope, All My Children, One Life to Live, and General Hospital in succession.
- On November 3; The Price Is Right, having done a week of hour-long test episodes in September, officially expanded to an hour. To accommodate the change; Give-n-Take (which had held the time slot immediately preceding Price for its final half-hour shows) moved to the 4 PM (ET)/3 PM (CT) slot that opened up following the cancellation of the short-lived Musical Chairs for the balance of its run before Give was ultimately replaced by Tattletales returning to that time slot.

== Saturday ==
Network		7:00 am	7:30 am	8:00 am	8:30 am	9:00 am	9:30 am	10:00 am	10:30 am	11:00 am	11:30 am	noon	12:30 pm	1:00 pm	1:30 pm	2:00 pm	2:30 pm	3:00 pm	3:30 pm	4:00 pm	4:30 pm	5:00 pm	5:30 pm	6:00 pm	6:30 pm
ABC	Fall	Local/syndicated programming		Hong Kong Phooey (R)	**The New Tom and Jerry/Grape Ape Show**		**The Lost Saucer**	The New Adventures of Gilligan	**Uncle Croc's Block**		**The Oddball Couple**	Speed Buggy (R)	American Bandstand		ABC Sports and/or local/syndicated programming										
ABC	Winter	Local/syndicated programming		Hong Kong Phooey (R)	**The New Tom and Jerry/Grape Ape Show**		**The Lost Saucer**	The New Adventures of Gilligan	Speed Buggy (R)	The Oddball Couple	Uncle Croc's Block		American Bandstand		ABC Sports and/or local/syndicated programming										
ABC	Spring	Local/syndicated programming		Hong Kong Phooey (R)	**The New Tom and Jerry/Grape Ape Show**		Groovie Goolies (R)	Super Friends (R)		The Oddball Couple	Speed Buggy (R)	The Lost Saucer	American Bandstand		ABC Sports and/or local/syndicated programming										
CBS	Fall	Local/syndicated programming		The Pebbles and Bamm-Bamm Show (R)	The Bugs Bunny/Road Runner Hour		Scooby-Doo, Where Are You! (R)	The Shazam!/**Isis** Hour		**Far Out Space Nuts**	**The Ghost Busters**	Valley of the Dinosaurs (R)	Fat Albert and the Cosby Kids	CBS Children's Film Festival		CBS Sports and/or local/syndicated programming								CBS Evening News	Local/syndicated programming
CBS	Summer	Local/syndicated programming		The Pebbles and Bamm-Bamm Show (R)	The Bugs Bunny/Road Runner Hour		**Clue Club**	The Shazam!/**Isis** Hour		**Far Out Space Nuts**	**The Ghost Busters**	Valley of the Dinosaurs (R)	Fat Albert and the Cosby Kids	CBS Children's Film Festival		CBS Sports and/or local/syndicated programming								CBS Evening News	Local/syndicated programming
NBC	Fall	Local/syndicated programming		Emergency +4 (R)	Sigmund and the Sea Monsters	**The Secret Lives of Waldo Kitty**	The Pink Panther Show	Land of the Lost	Run, Joe, Run	**Return to the Planet of the Apes**	**Westwind**	Josie and the Pussycats (R)	Go-U.S.A.	NBC Sports and/or local/syndicated programming										Local/syndicated programming	NBC Saturday Night News
NBC	October	Local/syndicated programming		Emergency +4 (R)	Josie and the Pussycats (R)	**The Secret Lives of Waldo Kitty**	The Pink Panther Show	Land of the Lost	Run, Joe, Run	**Return to the Planet of the Apes**	**Westwind**	The Jetsons (R)	Go-U.S.A.	NBC Sports and/or local/syndicated programming										Local/syndicated programming	NBC Saturday Night News

== Sunday ==
Network		7:00 am	7:30 am	8:00 am	8:30 am	9:00 am	9:30 am	10:00 am	10:30 am	11:00 am	11:30 am	noon	12:30 pm	1:00 pm	1:30 pm	2:00 pm	2:30 pm	3:00 pm	3:30 pm	4:00 pm	4:30 pm	5:00 pm	5:30 pm	6:00 pm	6:30 pm
ABC		Local/syndicated programming							Devlin (R)	These Are the Days (R)	Make a Wish	Issues and Answers		ABC Sports and/or local/syndicated programming											
CBS	Fall	Local/syndicated programming		The U.S. of Archie (R)	The Harlem Globetrotters Popcorn Machine (R)	Local/syndicated programming		Lamp Unto My Feet	Look Up and Live	Camera Three	Face The Nation	Local/syndicated programming	The NFL Today	NFL on CBS and/or local/syndicated programming										Local/syndicated programming	CBS Evening News
CBS	Winter	Local/syndicated programming		The U.S. of Archie (R)	The Harlem Globetrotters Popcorn Machine (R)	Local/syndicated programming		Lamp Unto My Feet	Look Up and Live	Camera Three	Face The Nation	CBS Sports and/or local/syndicated programming												Local/syndicated programming	CBS Evening News
NBC	Fall	Local/syndicated programming										Meet the Press	Grandstand	NFL on NBC and/or local/syndicated programming										Local/syndicated programming	NBC Sunday Night News
NBC	Winter	Local/syndicated programming											Meet the Press	NBC Sports and/or local/syndicated programming										Local/syndicated programming	NBC Sunday Night News

== By network ==
=== ABC ===
**Returning series**

- The $10,000 Pyramid
- ABC Evening News
- AM America
- All My Children
- American Bandstand
- Devlin (reruns)
- The Edge of Night (moved from CBS)
- General Hospital
- Groovie Goolies (reruns)
- Hong Kong Phooey (reruns)
- Issues and Answers
- Let's Make a Deal
- Make a Wish
- The New Adventures of Gilligan
- One Life to Live
- Rhyme and Reason
- Ryan's Hope
- Schoolhouse Rock!
- Showoffs
- Speed Buggy (reruns)
- Super Friends (reruns)
- These Are the Days (reruns)
- You Don't Say!

**New series**

- **The $20,000 Pyramid**
- **Break the Bank**
- **Family Feud**
- **Good Morning America**
- **Happy Days** (reruns)
- **Hot Seat**
- **The Lost Saucer**
- **The Neighbors**
- **The Tom and Jerry Show**
- **The Great Grape Ape Show**
- **The Oddball Couple**
- **Uncle Croc's Block**

**Not returning from 1974-75**

- The Big Showdown
- Blankety Blanks
- The Brady Bunch (reruns)
- The Girl in My Life
- Goober and the Ghost Chasers (reruns)
- Korg: 70,000 B.C.
- Lassie's Rescue Rangers (reruns)
- The Money Maze
- The Newlywed Game returned in 1977 in syndication
- Password returned in 1979 on NBC as Password Plus
- Split Second
- Yogi's Gang (reruns)

=== CBS ===
**Returning series**

- As the World Turns
- The Bugs Bunny/Road Runner Hour
- Camera Three
- Captain Kangaroo
- CBS Children's Film Festival
- CBS Evening News
- CBS Morning News
- The Edge of Night (moved to ABC)
- Face the Nation
- Fat Albert and the Cosby Kids
- Gambit
- Guiding Light
- The Harlem Globetrotters Popcorn Machine (reruns)
- Lamp Unto My Feet
- Look Up and Live
- Love of Life
- Match Game
- Musical Chairs
- The Pebbles and Bamm-Bamm Show (reruns)
- The Price Is Right
- Scooby-Doo, Where Are You! (reruns)
- Search for Tomorrow
- Shazam!
- Sunrise Semester
- Tattletales
- The U.S. of Archie (reruns)
- Valley of the Dinosaurs (reruns)
- The Young and the Restless

**New series**

- **All in the Family** (reruns)
- **Clue Club**
- **Far Out Space Nuts**
- **The Ghost Busters**
- **Give-n-Take**
- **The Secrets of Isis**

**Not returning from 1974-75**

- Bailey's Comets (reruns)
- The Hudson Brothers Razzle Dazzle Show
- Jeannie (reruns)
- The Joker's Wild
- My Favorite Martians (reruns)
- Now You See It returned in 1989
- Partridge Family 2200 A.D.
- Spin-Off

=== NBC ===
**Returning series**

- Another World
- Celebrity Sweepstakes
- Days of Our Lives
- The Doctors
- Emergency +4 (reruns)
- Go!
- High Rollers
- The Hollywood Squares
- Jackpot
- The Jetsons (reruns)
- Josie and the Pussycats (reruns)
- Land of the Lost
- The Magnificent Marble Machine
- Meet the Press
- NBC Nightly News
- NBC Saturday Night News
- NBC Sunday Night News
- The New Pink Panther Show
- Run, Joe, Run
- Sigmund and the Sea Monsters (reruns)
- Somerset
- Today
- Wheel of Fortune

**New Series**

- **The Fun Factory**
- **The Gong Show**
- **Return to the Planet of the Apes**
- **Sanford and Son** (reruns)
- **The Secret Lives of Waldo Kitty**
- **Take My Advice**
- **Three for the Money**
- **Westwind**

**Not returning from 1974-75**

- The Addams Family (reruns)
- Blank Check
- How to Survive a Marriage
- Jeopardy! returned in 1978 as The All-New Jeopardy!
- Star Trek: The Animated Series
- Wheelie and the Chopper Bunch
- Winning Streak

== See also ==
- 1975-76 United States network television schedule (prime-time)
- 1975-76 United States network television schedule (late night)
