= PDQ (game show) =

American television game shows

- Genre: Game show
- Presented by: Dennis James
- Announcer: Kenny Williams
- Country of origin: United States
- No. of seasons: 4
- No. of episodes: 826+

Production
- Running time: 22–24 minutes
- Production company: Heatter-Quigley Productions

Original release
- Network: Syndicated
- Release: September 6, 1965 – September 26, 1969

Related
- Baffle and All-Star Baffle (1973–74); All-Star Blitz; The Last Word

PDQ and Baffle are American television game shows created by Heatter-Quigley Productions. Both shows' objective was for contestant/celebrity teams to guess a given word or phrase in the shortest amount of time with the fewest letters given as possible.

PDQ, syndicated by Four Star Television, aired from September 6, 1965, to September 26, 1969, primarily on NBC-owned-and-operated stations but syndicated in markets where NBC did not own a station. PDQ was named after its original sponsor, PDQ Chocolate, a flavored drink mix. The show and product shared logos, although on the show the initials stood for "Please Draw Quickly".

Baffle was a revival that aired on NBC from March 26, 1973, to March 29, 1974, without a specific sponsor.

== PDQ (1965–69) ==
=== Personnel ===
Dennis James was the original host, with Monty Hall filling in on at least one occasion in James' absence before Let's Make a Deal moved to ABC. Kenny Williams was the announcer, and Arlo Hults provided the music.

For many years, rumors circulated that Bill Cullen replaced James later in the show's run; however, only one source has ever stated this (Alex McNeill's Total Television) and the existence of an episode taped October 3, 1968, with James as host has effectively debunked the claim. Further, Cullen was at the time based in New York City, while PDQ was taped in Hollywood; Cullen did not relocate to California until 1978.

=== Game play ===
The contestants consisted of three celebrities and one civilian. Two celebrities were paired as the "Home Team"; the third celebrity and the civilian contestant made up the opposing team, which was known as "The Challengers".

These two teams played a word game in which a player seated in an isolation booth attempted to guess a famous name, title, or phrase posed by their teammate who displayed letters as clues (one at a time, starting with three letters, with one of them being the first letter in the subject) on their own individual game board. A musical tone every few seconds served as a signal to add another letter. If the guessing player guessed the name after the time signal sounded, the team was still charged for the letter that should have been used. Each team took a turn at the same puzzle, with the team using fewer letters winning the game. A tie was considered a win for the contestant and the challengers. Prizes were awarded to the contestant for every game won by the challengers. A prize "for just being on the show", in the words of Kenny Williams, was always included, so that even if the challengers lost every game, the contestant would not leave empty-handed.

Each show featured a three-game "PDQ Special" match, with special prizes awarded to the contestant if the challengers won two out of three games. Another format had the teams score points according to the difference between how many letters used by both teams (a tie was considered a draw and nobody scored) with the first team to reach 10 points winning the game. The civilian contestant won $100 multiplied by the difference between the winning and losing scores.

=== Bonus game ===
A bonus round was played by the contestant toward the end of the show in which they had to identify ten words. The contestant was shown only three letters for each word (for example, BTR for "betray"), and had only five seconds allotted for each word. Each correct guess was worth $25 or, if the challengers used fewer letters than the home team, $50. If all ten words were guessed correctly in 60 seconds, in addition to winning $250/$500 the contestant also won a car; otherwise, the dollar amount won was redeemed for merchandise from the Spiegel Catalog. This bonus round proved to be extremely challenging; very few automobiles were won.

== Baffle (NBC, 1973–74) ==
(All-Star) Baffle
- Presented by: Dick Enberg
- Announcer: Kenny Williams
- Country of origin: United States
- No. of seasons: 2
- No. of episodes: 265

Production
- Running time: 22–24 minutes
- Production company: Heatter-Quigley Productions

Original release
- Network: NBC
- Release: March 26, 1973 – March 29, 1974

Related
- PDQ (1965–69); All-Star Blitz; The Last Word

In 1973, the PDQ format (minus the original sponsor) was revived and altered somewhat, re-christened as Baffle, and broadcast weekday mornings on NBC. The format was altered again later in 1973, this time with all the players being celebrities, with a title change to All-Star Baffle. Dick Enberg was the host, Kenny Williams returned as announcer, and Mort Garson was musical director.

=== Rules ===
The object of the revival was for a team of two players (a contestant and a celebrity player, in the original version, pairs of celebrities in the second) to guess a word or short phrase in less time than the opposing team. One player would sit in an isolation booth, and the partner would stand outside the booth in front of a rack, on which letters representing the answer were placed. These letters were out of view of the partner in the booth. When signaled by Enberg, that player would take three letters from the answer and place them on a board behind him or her where the partner in the booth could see them. The first letter of the answer had to be used, but the first three letters could not, nor could letters that appeared the same (e.g., if the answer is "Boston Red Sox", B-O-S could not be used even if the S from "Sox" was used, although B-S-O was allowed). A player who did so was penalized, with 15 seconds being added to their elapsed time. The player with the letters would then make gestures, similar to charades, that would aid the partner in guessing the answer.

Every few seconds a bell would ring and the player would add a letter from the rack to the board. The partner in the booth would shout out answers until the correct one was guessed, at which time the clock stopped, or the time limit of 60 seconds was reached.

The process would be repeated for the other team, using the same answer; the player in the other team's booth could not hear the show's audio when the first team was playing. The team that solved an answer the quickest won a prize.

Four rounds were played (six in earlier weeks) and at halftime, either the contestants changed partners or, in the all-star version, each team's partners switched positions. The team with the lowest total elapsed time won the game, and the "civilian" contestant went on to the bonus round. On All-Star Baffle, the winning celebrity team drew a card from a drum (filled out by the studio audience) and the lucky audience member got to play the bonus round.

==== Bonus round ====
There were two versions of the bonus round. In both versions, the contestant had 30 seconds to guess words based on three-letter clues given by Enberg, such as "GDN" for "garden". In the celebrity-contestant version, the contestant played up to five words, and each correct answer was worth $50 plus three seconds toward a sixth, much harder, word. If the sixth word was guessed correctly, the contestant won a car.

In the all-star version, there were nine words. The contestant won a prize based on how many correct answers were given, with the prize for eight always being a new car. The reward for getting all nine was not only the car, but also a trip and $5,000.

=== Broadcast history ===
The revamped PDQ replaced Concentration on NBC's daytime schedule at 10:30 a.m. (9:30 Central) on March 26, 1973. CBS, whose The Price Is Right led the 15-year-old game to its end, trotted that show off to afternoons and placed its new word-association game The $10,000 Pyramid at 10:30/9:30 that same day.

Generally speaking, the Dick Clark-hosted Pyramid got the better of things in the Nielsens, although Baffle, which featured many regular celebrities from its sister show Hollywood Squares, fought heartily.

But NBC daytime programming head Lin Bolen decided to use that slot to end the ten-year-old Jeopardy!, and on January 7, 1974, moved Baffle to 12:30 p.m. (11:30 a.m. Central). In this slot, it had to shave off five minutes for a newscast anchored by Edwin Newman before the top of the hour.

This cut, along with its competition (CBS' Search for Tomorrow and ABC's Split Second) and a replacement of civilian contestants with an all-celebrity format some months earlier, all worked to bring the year-old game to a halt on March 29, with Celebrity Sweepstakes taking over this slot the next Monday; its former competitor The $10,000 Pyramid fell in the ratings to Jeopardy! and ended its CBS run the same day as Baffle.

== Episode status ==
The 1964 pilot and episode #826 (taped October 3, 1968) of PDQ are held by the UCLA Film and Television Archive. The 1968 episode features Stubby Kaye, Jo Anne Worley and Arte Johnson as celebrity players. The pilot likely originated from James's personal archives, where he kept tapes of every show he hosted; it is available on the Internet Archive and, lacking a copyright notice, is believed to be in the public domain.

Three episodes of Baffle from 1973 (March 28, April 5, and April 13) are held in the UCLA Film & Television Archive.

In June 2014, a clip of the April 10, 1973, episode, featuring Hollywood Squares regulars Peter Marshall and Rose Marie, was uploaded to Wink Martindale's YouTube channel. The entire episode premiered on April 4, 2025.

MGM Television, as a successor-in-interest to Filmways (which purchased the Heatter-Quigley library in the late-1960s), owns the rights to the show and any future revivals.
