= The Amateur's Guide to Love =

- Created by: Merrill Heatter & Bob Quigley
- Presented by: Joe Flynn (pilot); Gene Rayburn
- Narrated by: Kenny Williams
- Composer: Mort Garson
- Country of origin: United States
- No. of episodes: 65

Production
- Running time: 30 Minutes
- Production company: Merrill Heatter-Bob Quigley Productions

Original release
- Network: CBS
- Release: March 27 – June 30, 1972

The Amateur's Guide to Love is an American television game show, created by Merrill Heatter and Bob Quigley, that ran on CBS from March 27 to June 30, 1972. Gene Rayburn was the emcee, while Kenny Williams was the announcer. The theme was written by Mort Garson.

Each episode began with Garson's theme song, set to shots of a van emblazoned with the Amateur's Guide to Love logo driving around southern California, with scenes of men and women falling in love with each other. As the van travels around, host Gene Rayburn sets the scene for the game show:

This little truck goes everywhere in search of lovers - in search, really, of you and me. For each of us, at sometime, has been involved with matters of the heart. Our truck goes to beaches, supermarkets, department stores, wherever there are people. We park outside, hide our camera, and observe our fellow creatures, struggling to do their best in romantic situations. Love has been with us since the dawn of creation, but still, we've never really learned how to handle it. The Amateur's Guide to Love is here to help.

Afterwards, the show would then cut to the studio, where announcer Kenny Williams would introduce this week's panelists ("our guidebook advisors"), and Rayburn.

== Gameplay ==
The show somewhat resembled Candid Camera, a show involving guest celebrities and unsuspecting civilians. These people were involved in a comedy situation, taped on location in Southern California using a hidden camera. The subjects in the particular situation were faced with two choices, one of which they needed to choose, that were somehow related to sex, marriage, or love. A celebrity panel voted upon which choice would have been the smartest, and the civilian who picked that particular decision won merchandise prizes.

== Broadcast history ==
Amateur's Guide originated as a pilot that aired as part of CBS' Comedy Playhouse on August 8, 1971. This early version of the series was hosted by actor Joe Flynn instead of Rayburn, and featured a four-celebrity panel (Rose Marie, Dick Martin, Michael Landon and Peter Marshall) instead of three.

The program was CBS' first daytime game since the cancellation of To Tell the Truth in September 1968. The series replaced reruns of Gomer Pyle, USMC at 4:00 PM (3:00 Central). However, the show failed to make an impact against Somerset on NBC and daytime rebroadcasts of the popular Love, American Style on ABC. Reruns of the sitcom My Three Sons replaced it on July 3.

Later that year, CBS returned with game shows in its daytime lineup on September 4 with The New Price Is Right, Gambit, and The Joker's Wild. Rayburn himself would return to CBS in July 1973 with a revival of his hit NBC show, Match Game.

== Episode status ==
Like many game shows of the era, The Amateur's Guide to Love is believed to have been wiped, as only one episode is known to exist. CBS stopped their wiping practices sometime in 1972, long before either of its other Big Three networks, but some series of the time have uncertain statuses. On May 22, 2025, the premiere episode was originally uploaded on YouTube by Christian Carrion, however, it was subsequently deleted and later moved to the Internet Archive.
