= Hip Hop Squares =

- Genre: Game show
- Based on: Hollywood Squares by: Merrill Heatter; Bob Quigley
- Directed by: Rob George (2012); Ivan Dudynsky (2017-2019)
- Presented by: Peter Rosenberg; DeRay Davis
- Narrated by: DJ Ms. Nix; Ice Cube
- Theme music composer: Kush Klein (2012)
- Opening theme: "Hip Hop Squares Theme"
- Country of origin: United States
- Original language: English
- No. of seasons: 5
- No. of episodes: 69

Production
- Executive producers: Michael Canter (2012); Jesse Collins (2017–2019); Dionne Harmon (2017–2019); Scott St. John (2017–2019); Ice Cube (2017–2019); Jeff Kwatinetz (2017–2019); Neal Konstantini (2019)
- Production locations: Steiner Studios, Brooklyn, New York (2012); Hollywood Center Studios, Los Angeles, California (2017–2019)
- Camera setup: Multi-camera
- Running time: 21 minutes
- Production companies: MTV Networks (2012); Canter/Krask Industries (2012); Jesse Collins Entertainment; Entertain the Brutes; Start Entertainment (2019); Cube Vision; The Firm (2017–2018); CBS Television Distribution

Original release
- Network: MTV2
- Release: May 22 – December 18, 2012
- Network: VH1
- Release: March 13, 2017 – September 17, 2019

Related
- Hollywood Squares; Storybook Squares; Match Game-Hollywood Squares Hour; Nashville Squares

Hip Hop Squares is an American television game show originally hosted by Peter Rosenberg, which debuted on MTV2 on May 22, 2012. The show is a licensed format of CBS Television Distribution's Hollywood Squares (King World Productions, CBS Television Distribution's predecessor company, acquired the franchise in 1991 from Orion Television) featuring mostly rappers. The MTV2 version of the show was taped in Brooklyn, New York. The VH1 version was taped in Hollywood, California.

Because of the show's status as part of the Hollywood Squares franchise, the show marked the sixth decade that a version of the franchise has aired on television, joining Let's Make a Deal, Jeopardy!, and The Newlywed Game (later joined by Wheel of Fortune and Family Feud) as a game show that has aired in six different decades. (Only The Price Is Right and To Tell the Truth have been on longer; both have aired in eight decades.)

On July 28, 2016, VH1 announced a new version of Hip Hop Squares, which premiered on March 13, 2017. The series is executive produced by rapper and actor Ice Cube and hosted by DeRay Davis. Additionally, Davis was a semi-regular panelist on the original MTV2 version before becoming the host of the VH1 version. A fourth season (second for VH1) began on April 18, 2018. The fifth season (third for VH1) premiered on August 13, 2019.

== Setting and format ==
=== MTV2 version ===
A win in the first two rounds is worth $500, and $1,000 in round three. The Secret Square (renamed the "G-Spot") takes place in round two, with a $1,000 cash bonus awarded for correctly answering the question (but does not count towards the player's score). If time runs out in the middle of a round, each square on the board is worth $100 and the contestant with the higher score wins.

The winning contestant then picks one of the three rows, with each celebrity in that row providing an answer to a multiple-choice question. The contestant must pick the celebrity with the correct answer to win a $2,500 bonus.

=== VH1 version ===
Two celebrities associated with the hip hop music genre play the game and win money for members of the studio audience. To make their decision, the celebrity who is in control must press one of two buttons in front of them: a green button to lock in agree or red to disagree. In addition, starting in Season 3, the questions have props to aid the celebrities.

A win is worth $1,000 ($500 in some episodes) in the first round and $2,000 ($1,000 in some episodes) in the second. In addition, each captured square is worth a random cash amount revealed when a star is chosen. In Season 1, cash amounts range from $300 to $900 ($100 to $500 in some episodes) in round 1 and $500 to $1,500 ($300 to $900 in some episodes) in Round 2. Starting in Season 2, cash amounts range from $500 to $1,500 in round 1 and $500 - $2,000 in Round 2. The Secret Square returned in Season 3 (renamed the "Hidden Square)", played in game 1. As before, picking that square and giving a correct judgement wins a bonus prize. The celebrity contestant with the higher score after the second round (or when a sounder alerts that time in the entire game is up, no matter which round of the game is being played) wins the game and plays the bonus round with their designated audience member.

==== Bonus Round ====
In Season 1, the bonus round is called "three-in-a-row" where the winning celebrity and audience member try to obtain a tic-tac-toe, which then doubles the total winnings from the main game. Squares on the game board randomly flash, which is then stopped using a button pressed by the team. The team's symbol is then placed in the square, and the process repeats. If the team can obtain a tic-tac-toe in five spins, the team's winnings from the main game are doubled.

In Season 2, the Bonus Round is called "Pick That Dough". In the round, the audience member chooses three celebrities to form a tic-tac-toe on the board. Each celebrity is holding a record sleeve which contains a disc. Eight of the discs contain a cash prize ranging from $1 to $5,000 which is added to the money already won. The final disc's prize is either a tropical vacation, a new car or, in one episode sponsored by Burger King, an additional cash prize of $25,000. Whatever prizes are revealed by the three celebrities are awarded to the audience member. If the grand prize disc is not chosen by the player, the identity of the disc's holder is revealed at the end of the show.

Season 3's bonus round is called "Square Secrets". The celebrities are asked before the show to reveal a secret about themselves. The celebrity contestant and their partner are tasked to pick three of the squares in a tic-tac-toe formation. Once chosen, the host reveals a secret that is attributed to only one of the three celebrities and asks the team to choose the celebrity to whom it is attributed. If the team is correct, the audience member receives an additional $10,000 or in some select episodes which are sponsored, the winner receives an additional $25,000.

== Broadcast history ==
Casting for contestants on Hip Hop Squares began in March 2012. The show began taping on April 4, 2012 and recorded 20 episodes at Steiner Studios throughout the month. Hip Hop Squares premiered on MTV2 on May 22, 2012. The first season consisted of 8 episodes on consecutive Tuesday evenings, concluding on July 10, 2012. The series premiere was the highest viewed premiere for MTV2 by viewers aged 12–34 ever, with 329,000 viewers total. Season one averaged nearly 260,000 over its eight episodes. The second season, with an additional 12 episodes, began on October 23, 2012. Episodes aired on Tuesday nights, with two episodes airing during the first two weeks and final week, concluding on December 18, 2012.

On July 28, 2016, VH1, a network in the Viacom Media Networks family along with MTV2, announced a new version of Hip Hop Squares which premiered on March 13, 2017, executive produced by rapper and actor Ice Cube and hosted by DeRay Davis.
