= Storybook Squares =

Children's version of Hollywood Squares

- Title card for the 1976–1977 version.
- Based on: Hollywood Squares by: Merrill Heatter; Bob Quigley
- Presented by: Peter Marshall
- Announcer: Kenny Williams
- Country of origin: United States
- No. of episodes: 16 (1969 version); 30 (1976–1977 version) at least 2 (1978 version)

Production
- Production locations: NBC Studios; Burbank, California
- Running time: 30 minutes
- Production company: Heatter-Quigley Productions

Original release
- Network: NBC
- Release: January 4, 1969 – December 30, 1977

Storybook Squares is an American game show. It is a spin-off of Hollywood Squares. The series featured celebrities dressed up as famous people and characters from history and various forms of media.

Peter Marshall served as host of these episodes. The panelists were introduced by "The Guardian of the Gate", who announced their characters' presence by reading their names from a scroll. The Guardian was played by regular Hollywood Squares announcer Kenny Williams, and the character was similar to his "Town Crier" character from Video Village.

The series ran on NBC on Saturday mornings from January 4 to April 19, 1969, with repeats airing until August 30. The concept was revived during the 1976-1977 season as a series of special theme weeks on the daytime Hollywood Squares, and in a revised "adult" costume party-version for the 1978 "nighttime" syndicated run.

== Format ==
On the original edition of Storybook Squares, the game was played in the same manner as the regular game, with celebrities in the squares dressed as storybook and nursery rhyme characters. Two children competed, always boy vs. girl. Like on the regular Hollywood Squares, boys played X and girls played circle. Instead of playing for money, each game was played for a prize.

The first two games on each episode of Storybook Squares were, as on Hollywood Squares, Secret Square games. Each game was played for a different prize, and if the first prize was unclaimed it could be won along with the second prize in the second game.

=== Panelists (1969) ===
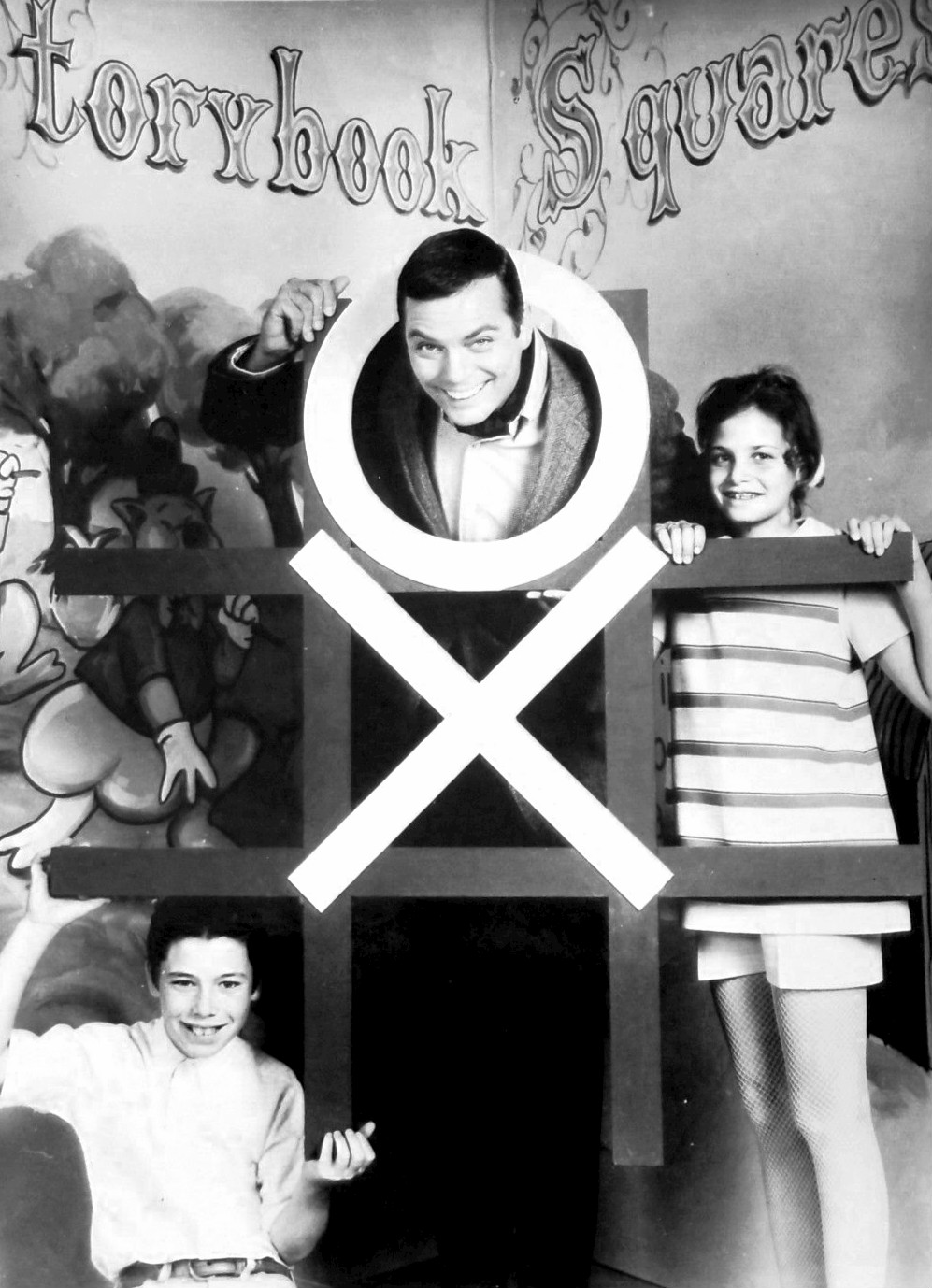
Host Peter Marshall with contestants on Storybook Squares in 1969

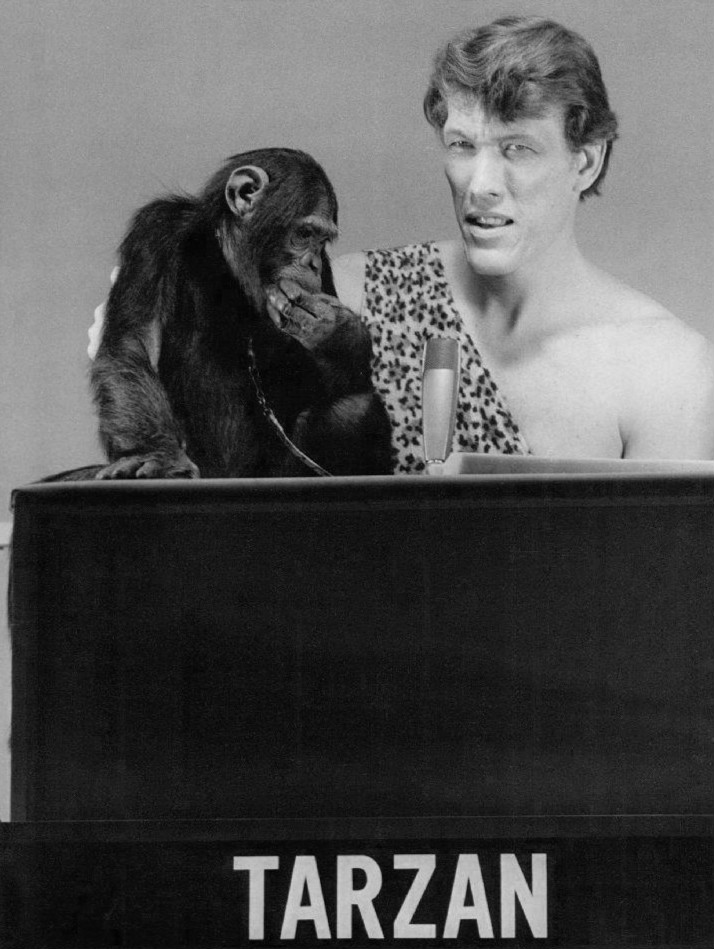
Ted Cassidy, best known as Lurch on The Addams Family as Tarzan with Cheeta was a 1969 panelist.

The only panelist from the adult show who played as he normally would was Cliff Arquette, who carried his "Charley Weaver" persona over to Storybook Squares. The other panelists played characters from fairy tales and books, historical figures, or in some cases the characters they played on television.

Unlike the parent series, on Storybook Squares each panelist/character was given an elaborate introduction as they entered the set and took their place on the board, allowing for a brief comic interaction with host Marshall as they did so. Some of the celebrities who appeared were:

- Marty Allen as Tarzan and Cupid
- Jim Backus as Mr. Magoo (animated character for whom he provided the voice) and Thurston Howell III (his character from Gilligan's Island)
- Ted Cassidy as Tarzan
- Charo as Queen Isabella
- Wally Cox as Paul Revere and Davy Crockett
- Bob Crane as Colonel Hogan (his role on Hogan's Heroes)
- Abby Dalton as Little Miss Muffet
- Barbara Eden as Jeannie (her role on I Dream of Jeannie)
- Nanette Fabray as The Old Woman Who Lived in the Shoe
- Stu Gilliam as Merlin
- Arte Johnson as Wolfgang the Nazi from Rowan & Martin's Laugh-In, referred to herein as the "'Very Interesting' Soldier"
- Paul Lynde as Frankenstein's monster and the Evil Queen from Snow White
- Paul Winchell as Romeo and Dr. Jekyll (with Tessie Mahoney- Jerry Mahoney in a blond wig- as Juliet and Jerry Mahoney as Mr. Hyde)
- Carolyn Jones as Morticia Addams (her role on The Addams Family)
- Rose Marie as Pocahontas and Annie Oakley
- Roy Rogers and Dale Evans
- Soupy Sales as Henry VIII and Thomas Edison
- William Shatner as James T. Kirk (his character from Star Trek)
- Leslie Uggams as Snow White

== 1976-1977 return ==
When the daytime series brought back Storybook Squares, its format was changed slightly. Instead of a two-player match featuring boys playing girls, the matches used a team format with the boys playing with their fathers and grandfathers and the girls with their mothers and grandmothers.

The children played the first game of the match, with the parents playing the second and the grandparents each subsequent game as time permitted. $300 was awarded for each game won, with $50 awarded per square if time was called during a game.

The team with the most money at the end of the game won a large prize, such as a car or exotic vacation.

=== Panelists (1976–1977) ===
- Marty Allen as Tarzan
- Milton Berle as Old Mother Hubbard
- Valerie Bertinelli as Little Miss Muffet
- Caroll Spinney as Big Bird (Muppet character which he controlled from 1969 to 1998)
- Hal Smith as Mother Goose
- Paul Lynde as Attila the Hun, Frankenstein's monster, The Wicked Witch, Davy Crockett, and Paul Bunyan
- William Shatner as Captain Kirk
- Elke Sommer as Guinevere
- Susan Seaforth Hayes as Eve and Cleopatra
- Bill Hayes as Adam and Caesar
- Connie Stevens as The Queen of Hearts
- Karen Valentine as Mona Lisa
- Anson Williams as Simple Simon
- Florence Henderson as Belle Starr
- Doc Severinsen (with his trumpet) as The Pied Piper and Gabriel
- George Gobel as Henry VIII
- Vincent Price as Captain Hook
- Pat Harrington (Jr.) as Leonardo da Vinci
- Rip Taylor as General Custer
- Joan Rivers as The Old Woman Who Lived in the Shoe
- Bonnie Franklin as Goldilocks and Peter Pan
- John Byner as Long John Silver
- Roddy McDowall as Sherlock Holmes and Pinocchio
- Arte Johnson as Beethoven
- Jo Ann Worley as Martha Washington
- Soupy Sales as Thomas Edison
- Rich Little as Noah
- Julie McWhirter(-Dees) as Glinda the Good Witch (though referred to as "the Good Fairy") and Dorothy Gale
- Charo as Lady Godiva (she wore a sparkly flesh-toned bodysuit rather than appear actually nude)

== "Hollywood Squares Party" (1978 syndication) ==
For some of the nighttime syndicated episodes in 1978, the show did an "adult" version of dress-up for a series of episodes entitled "Hollywood Squares Party". Two of these episodes are posted to YouTube. Scoring was as with the regular syndicated episodes at the time ($250 per game, with 2-3 "Secret Square" games played per episode). Peter was simply introduced in these episodes as "host for the party".

=== Panelists (1978) ===
The celebrities were in costume in these episodes as follows:

- Mel Brooks as Chief Running Bagel (his Native American character from Blazing Saddles) and Mel Funn (his character from Silent Movie)
- Tammy Wynette as Scarlett O'Hara and Madame Pompadour
- Victor French as Chief Roy Mobey from Carter Country
- Lauren Tewes as the Statue of Liberty
- Paul Williams as Dracula
- George Gobel as the Sheik of Araby and Confucius
- Elke Sommer as Catherine the Great
- John Byner as Casanova and Rasputin
- Sandy Duncan as Mrs. Satan
- Steve Landesberg as King Solomon
- Valerie Bertinelli as the Bride of Frankenstein
- Denise Nicholas as "Queen Tut" (supposed bride of King Tut)
- Paul Lynde as the Son of a Musketeer and Narcissus

In addition, for at least one episode, a pair of celebrity lookalikes played the game: Miss Circle was Gloria Marr impersonating Phyllis Diller, while Mister X was Joe Dimmick as Clint Eastwood.

== Set ==
The 1969 set was decked out in a medieval theme for the host and players' podiums, while the gameboard remained the same as on the adult version. The 1970s sets extended the medieval theme to the entire set, with a sweeping castle facade built around and behind the "Squares". The 1978 episodes featured a mostly black set with silver trim around the squares and the contestant podiums.
