= Temptation (1967 American game show) =

1967 United States television game show

Temptation is an American game show which aired on ABC from December 4, 1967 to March 1, 1968. It was produced by Merrill Heatter and Bob Quigley. Art James was the host, and Carl King was the announcer. This is one of the few Heatter-Quigley programs that Kenny Williams was not involved with.

== Game play ==
Three contestants were shown three prizes of varying value; each contestant secretly selected the prize s/he wanted. The contestant won the prize only if neither of his/her opponents picked it.

Five rounds were played; in the third and fourth rounds, James would tell the players which two of them had chosen before they made a final selection. In the final round, if only two players chose the same prize, the remaining player won all three prizes. The player with the highest dollar total returned to the next show.

James always appeared dressed as a riverboat gambler with tuxedo, ruffled shirt, and cigar.

== KTLA version ==
A version aired for four weeks on Monday evenings at 10:30 pm on Los Angeles' KTLA from September 12–October 3, 1960, with Tom Kennedy as host. The rules were somewhat different compared to the later run.

- If only one person won a prize, that contestant also won $500. If all three won a prize, then first place won $300; second received $200, while third place got $100.
- One prize in each round was designated the "bonus prize" and added bonus points to the contestant's score.

=== Round 5 ===
The contestants lined up in order of score and were presented with five prizes plus one price. Matching the price with the prize won it plus $500, after which the next person in line played for a less expensive prize. If the first contestant missed, the second-place finisher played with the same prizes and price. After this, the winner played the bonus round.

=== Bonus round ===
The bonus round was played with three boxes containing money. Two boxes held $500, while the third held a jackpot which started at $1,000 and increased by $500 each day until won. The contestant picked a box, after which Kennedy offered to "buy back" the box for $750.

If the offer was refused, Kennedy would open one of the two $500 boxes, then allow the contestant to switch their choice for the other unopened box. If a contestant won the jackpot they automatically retired, but played one last game for a car.

Two boxes were shown. One contained a car, while the other had nothing. The contestant was offered $2,500 to quit, or picked a box. If a contestant did not win the jackpot, but won five games, they played an altered "two-box" game with no bribes – one box contained the jackpot (guaranteed to be at least $3,000), while the other contained the car.

The three-box bonus round format resembles the Monty Hall problem, which was made famous on Let's Make a Deal.

== Episode status ==
Both versions are presumed to be destroyed as per practices at the time. Three ABC episodes are held by the UCLA Film and Television Archive.
