= Lloyd Thaxton =

American writer, producer, director and pop music TV host (1927–2008)

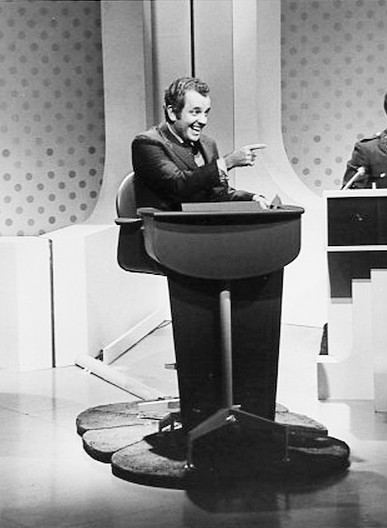
Thaxton as host of the game show Funny You Should Ask in 1968

Lloyd Thaxton (May 31, 1927 – October 5, 2008) was an American writer, television producer, director, and television host widely known for his syndicated pop music television program of the 1960s, The Lloyd Thaxton Show, which began as a local Los Angeles program on KCOP in September 1961.

He was also a magazine columnist.

== Life and career ==
The son of a newspaperman, Thaxton was born in Memphis, Tennessee. He grew up in Toledo, Ohio. On graduating from high school, Thaxton enlisted in the Navy, "barely hours" before he would have been drafted.

After starting his radio career in Toledo, he moved to Los Angeles in 1957, becoming, in his words, a "freelance announcer" and host of the highly rated Leave It to Lloyd talk show on KHJ-TV. He casually coined the term "freelance announcer" since his work in commercials was most active toward the end of the era of live television; Thaxton would go from venue to venue performing the commercials live, since videotape was not in wide use then. Many of his commercials for KHJ and KNXT were for the now-defunct Southern California discount chain, White Front. His career at KCOP began in 1958 both as a commercial announcer and as announcer for The June Levant Show, an afternoon talk show starring the wife of celebrated pianist Oscar Levant. This led to his own afternoon show, Lloyd Thaxton's Record Shop, in 1959.

In 1961 The Lloyd Thaxton Show (sometimes known as "The Lloyd Thaxton Hop") debuted on KCOP as an hour-long presentation from 5 to 6 p.m. The format, much along the lines of American Bandstand, featured local high school students dancing on the soundstage to the latest records. The show was almost totally unscripted and spontaneous. Thaxton's description of the idea: "No one told me what I had to do. I was producing it myself. I was writing it myself." Thaxton frequently clowned around on stage to the music, lip-synching the vocals and accompanying the records on guitar or piano. One favorite recurring skit had the costumed Thaxton on his knees, impersonating painter Toulouse-Lautrec, while lip-synching a current song. He also occasionally "performed" on an odd contraption made from a tennis racket and a bow and arrow that roughly looked like a guitar and "play-synked" popular early-1960s instrumental tunes like "Scratchy" by Travis Wammack and various The Ventures and Link Wray guitar songs. The Lloyd Thaxton Show, with its mix of new music and comedy skits, gained a viewership of at least 350,000 homes, including those on the East Coast. Thaxton would end each show by saying, "I'm Lloyd Thaxton," followed by the teen audience shouting, "So what," whereupon the Bill Black Combo instrumental of the same name would play.

Although some cities carried his show almost from its inception, like KPTV in Portland, Oregon, The Lloyd Thaxton Show went into national syndication in late 1964.

Thaxton's face appeared at the top of the newly launched Tiger Beat magazine (then known as "Lloyd Thaxton's Tiger Beat"), for which he did a column. According to IMDb, Thaxton was a co-founder of Tiger Beat.

During the late 1960s Thaxton hosted two short-lived game shows for ABC: Everybody's Talking (1967) and Funny You Should Ask (1968–69). He also was a radio talk show host on KABC-790 in Los Angeles from 1972 to 1974.

Moving behind the scenes, in 1977 he created the syndicated game show Pro-Fan, which he also announced. Charlie Jones hosted the series. He also served as producer and director of the weekly consumer advocate show Fight Back! With David Horowitz from 1976 to 1992, as well as producer for NBC's The Today Show.

In 2003 Thaxton and motivational speaker John Alston co-wrote Stuff Happens (and then you fix it), published by Wiley & Sons.

Thaxton met his second wife, Barbara Snyder Whitman, on the set of the NBC summer series Showcase '68. They were married August 11, 1969. They had no children but remained married until his death from multiple myeloma in October 2008; the disease had been diagnosed in May of that year. He lived in Studio City, California, and was the head of his own entertainment firm, LT Productions.

== Legacy ==
His show was recalled in the lyrics of The Go-Go's song "Beatnik Beach," which appeared on the 1982 album Vacation: "We'll lipsync a go-go / Like on the Lloyd Thaxton Show, yeah ..."

Thaxton was obliquely mentioned in a riff on the Mystery Science Theater 3000 takeoff of the movie Monster A Go-Go.

Clips from his show were used in the 1988 film The In Crowd.
