= People Will Talk (game show) =

- Created by: Merrill Heatter; Bob Quigley
- Presented by: Dennis James
- Narrated by: Kenny Williams
- Country of origin: United States

Production
- Running time: 30 Minutes
- Production companies: Heatter-Quigley Productions; Four Star Television

Original release
- Network: NBC
- Release: July 1 – December 27, 1963

People Will Talk is an American game show that aired on NBC from July 1 to December 27, 1963. The host was Dennis James, with Kenny Williams announcing. In 1964, packager Heatter-Quigley Productions revamped the program on CBS under the name The Celebrity Game, with host Carl Reiner at CBS Television City in Hollywood.

== Game play ==
The object was to argue opposite sides of a question and try to find support of their opinions among a panel of fifteen celebrities. Two studio contestants competed against one another in arguing sides of a question, such as "Should a woman lie about her age?" resulting in either a yes or no answer. The contestants would state why they chose that side.

After hearing both sides of the story, the celebrity panel would then vote yes or no. After voting, contestants chose a celebrity that they thought agreed with their point of view. If the contestant and celebrity matched answers, the contestant won $25. If their points of view differed, the other contestant won the $25.

The first person to collect $100 won the game and merchandise prizes.

== Pilot ==
The pilot was shot at CBS with Arthur Godfrey as host.

== Episode status ==
The show is rumored to be destroyed (including the pilot) with the exception of one or two episodes.
