= Shenanigans (game show) =

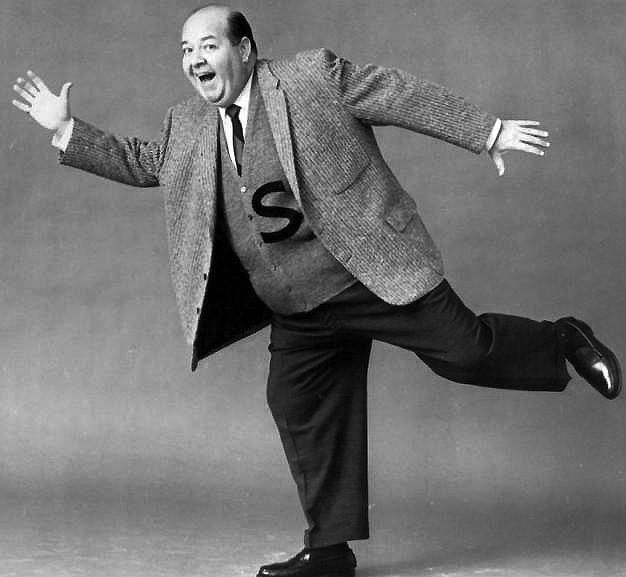
- Stubby Kaye, the host of the show.
- Developed by: Milton Bradley Company
- Presented by: Stubby Kaye
- Narrated by: Kenny Williams
- Country of origin: United States
- No. of episodes: 39

Production
- Executive producers: Merrill Heatter; Bob Quigley
- Running time: 30 minutes
- Production companies: Heatter-Quigley Productions, in association with Four Star Television

Original release
- Network: ABC
- Release: September 26, 1964 – December 18, 1965

Shenanigans was a children's television game show produced by Heatter-Quigley Productions which aired on ABC Saturday mornings from September 26, 1964 to March 20, 1965, and again from September 25 to December 18, 1965. The series began as local programming in New York City and later aired nationally on ABC. The show was similar to Video Village Junior, another program produced by Heatter-Quigley which featured children as contestants moving about a life-sized game board.

Stubby Kaye hosted the program, dubbed "the Mayor of Shenanigans," and Kenny Williams was the announcer, known as "Kenny the Cop". Williams portrayed a similar role on Video Village.

== Game play ==
Children stood on a giant game board; a button was pressed that stopped a set of flashing lights with the numbers one through four, and the children advanced on the game board the corresponding number of spaces. The children then answered a question or performed a stunt and earning "Shenaniganzas", scrip that could be traded for items from the Top Value Stamp Catalog. Possible prizes were also suspended from the ceiling in the studio.

Most of the spaces on the game board were references to popular board games by the show's sponsor Milton Bradley Company, such as Operation. In 1964, a board game was published by Milton Bradley as a companion to the show.

== See also ==
Similar game shows that came after Shenanigans:

- Finders Keepers
- Fun House
- Double Dare
- Where in the World Is Carmen Sandiego?
- Family Game Night
