= Four Star Television =

Defunct American television production company

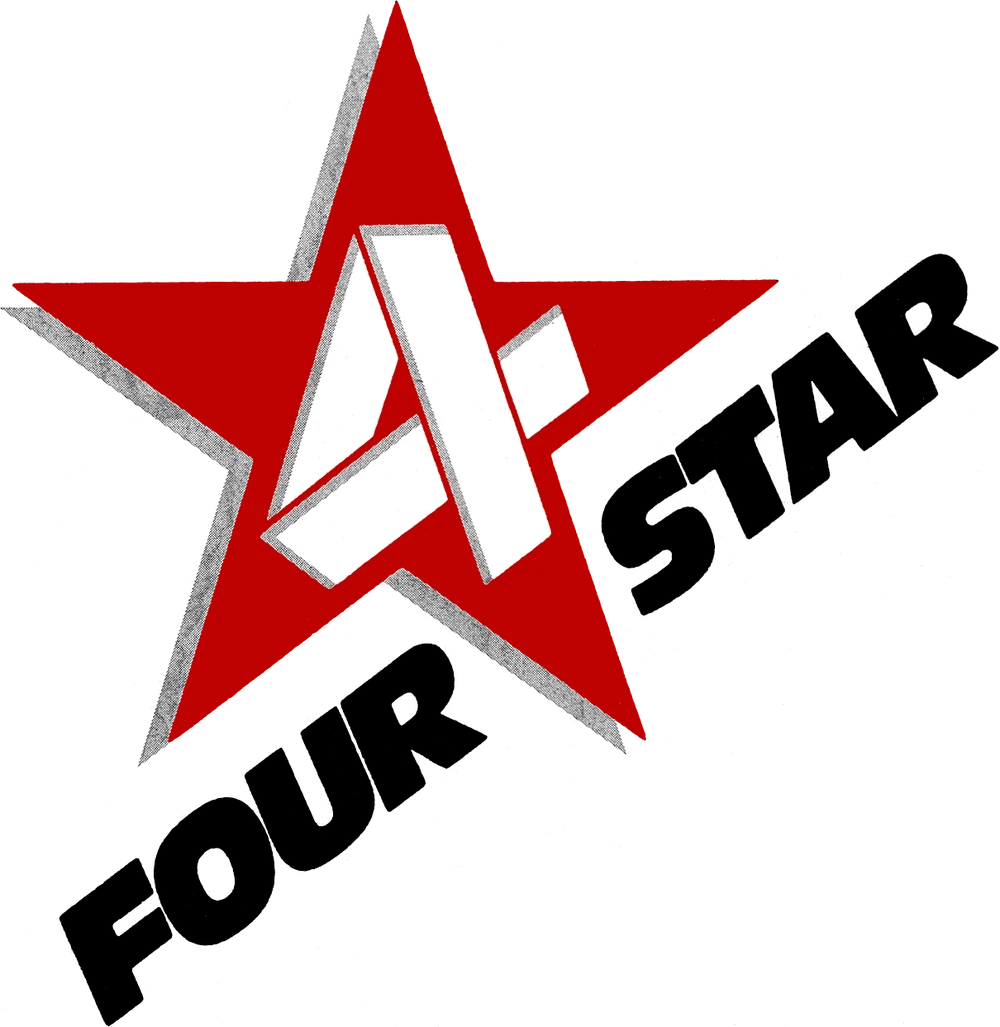
- Formerly: Four Star Productions (1952–1959)
- Type: Subsidiary
- Traded as: NYSE: FSI
- Industry: Television production
- Founded: 1952; 74 years ago (as Four Star Productions); January 12, 1959; 67 years ago (incorporated as Four Star Television)
- Founders: Dick Powell; David Niven; Charles Boyer; Ida Lupino; Joel McCrea
- Defunct: 1997; 29 years ago
- Fate: Sold to Compact Video as the result of a leveraged buyout by MacAndrews & Forbes
- Successors: TV: Four Star International; Library: 20th Television
- Headquarters: Beverly Hills, California; Costa Mesa, California
- Key people: David Charnay (president); Dick Powell (president); David Niven (president); Ida Lupino (president); Charles Boyer (president)
- Products: Television

Four Star Television, also called Four Star International, was an American television production company. Founded in 1952 as Four Star Productions by prominent Hollywood actors Dick Powell, David Niven, Charles Boyer and Joel McCrea, it was inspired by Lucille Ball and Desi Arnaz founding Desilu Productions a year earlier. McCrea left soon after its founding to continue in films, television and radio, and was replaced by Ida Lupino as the fourth star—although Lupino did not own stock in the company.

Four Star produced several popular programs in the early days of television, including Four Star Playhouse (its first series), Dick Powell's Zane Grey Theatre, Stagecoach West, The June Allyson Show (also known as The DuPont Show Starring June Allyson), The Dick Powell Show, Burke's Law, The Rogues and The Big Valley. Despite its stars sharing equal billing, Powell played the biggest role in the company's early success and growth.

Powell became President of Four Star within a few years of its formation and, in 1955, Four Star Films, Inc. was formed as an affiliate which produced such hit shows as The Rifleman; Trackdown; Wanted Dead or Alive; Richard Diamond, Private Detective and The Detectives Starring Robert Taylor. There were also failed series, including Jeannie Carson's Hey, Jeannie!

In late 1958, Four Star Productions and Four Star Films were merged into a new holding company called Four Star Television, and began publicly trading on the American Stock Exchange on January 12, 1959. After Powell's death in 1963, Four Star was led by Thomas McDermott, followed by Aaron Spelling. It was then purchased and developed for global film and television markets by David Charnay, and subsequently was sold to Ron Perelman; Perelman sold it to 20th Century Fox Television in 1996.

== History ==
=== Dick Powell ===
Dick Powell, a Hollywood veteran of twenty years in 1952, longed to produce and direct. While he did have some opportunities to do so, such as RKO Radio Pictures' The Conqueror (1956) with John Wayne, Powell saw greater opportunities offered by the then-infant medium of television.

=== Four Star Playhouse ===
Powell came up with an idea for an anthology series, with a rotation of established stars every week, four stars in all. The stars would own the studio and the program, as Lucille Ball and Desi Arnaz had done successfully with the Desilu studio.

Powell had intended for the program to feature himself, Charles Boyer, Joel McCrea and Rosalind Russell; however, Russell and McCrea backed out, and David Niven came on board as the "third star". The fourth star would be a guest star at first. CBS liked the idea, and Four Star Playhouse made its debut in the fall of 1952. While it ran on alternate weeks during its first season (the program it alternated with was the television version of Amos 'n' Andy), it was successful enough to be renewed and become a weekly program beginning with the second season and until the end of its run in 1956.

Actress/director Ida Lupino was brought on board as the pro forma fourth star, though unlike Powell, Boyer, and Niven, she owned no stock in the company.

=== Westerns ===
Following the cancellation of Four Star Playhouse, two new programs came on CBS: a comedy called Hey, Jeannie! which starred Jeannie Carson, and a western anthology show Zane Grey Theater, more formally named Dick Powell's Zane Grey Theater. Carson's show ran for just a season, but Zane Grey Theater ran for four. It hosted the pilot episodes for Trackdown starring Robert Culp (which in turn hosted a pilot for Wanted: Dead or Alive with Steve McQueen), The Westerner with Brian Keith, Black Saddle with Peter Breck and Russell Johnson and The Rifleman, starring Chuck Connors, Johnny Crawford and Paul Fix.

While not given a production byline, when Joel McCrea and Walter Mirisch developed the 1959–1960 NBC series Wichita Town, adapted from the 1955 film Wichita in which McCrea starred as Wyatt Earp, Four Star provided the production facilities.

=== Richard Diamond, Private Detective ===
In 1957 Four Star debuted the first of its many police/detective shows, Richard Diamond, Private Detective. The "Diamond" series was originally created for radio by Blake Edwards, and the character played by Powell, but Powell recast the character with the then-unknown Clark Gable-lookalike David Janssen. Don Taylor portrayed Richard Diamond in the pilot film.

Other crime series produced by Four Star included Target: The Corruptors! with Stephen McNally and Robert Harland, The Detectives starring Robert Taylor, Adam West, Tige Andrews, Mark Goddard, Russell Thorson and Lee Farr and Burke's Law starring Gene Barry, Gary Conway, Russell Thorson and Leon Lontoc and Honey West starring Anne Francis and John Ericson.

=== The Rogues ===
Another program, The Rogues, starred Boyer and Niven with Gig Young on NBC TV. This was (after Four Star Playhouse) the closest the studio's owners would come to appearing on the same program. The idea was for the three actors to alternate as the lead each week playing moral con-man cousins out to fleece reprehensible villains, often with one or two of the others turning up to play a small part in the caper (real ensemble episodes were rare).

The schedule of who pulled leading man duty was largely determined by the actors' movie commitments, thereby giving Niven, Boyer, and Young additional work between film roles. In any event, Young wound up helming most of the episodes since he usually had more spare time than Niven or Boyer, but even he had to be replaced by Larry Hagman as another cousin for two episodes when Young was too busy. The series lasted only through the 1964–65 season.

=== A powerhouse Hollywood launching pad ===
The studio was successful in the late 1950s as a result of the success of its programs. Four Star also helped bring some prominent names in television and movies to public attention including David Janssen, Steve McQueen, Robert Culp, Chuck Connors, Mary Tyler Moore, Linda Evans, Jeannie Carson, Lee Majors, The Smothers Brothers, Aaron Spelling, Dick Powell, David Niven, Joel McCrea, Charles Boyer, Ida Lupino, Richard Long, Peter Breck and Sam Peckinpah. The studio was well known as being sympathetic to creative staff. Powell often battled with network executives on behalf of writers, directors, and actors. They even had a partnership with game show duo Merrill Heatter and Bob Quigley, who owned Heatter-Quigley Productions, and had an ownership stake in Marterto Productions, in 1961.

=== Dick Powell's death, Aaron Spelling and Heatter-Quigley's exit ===
On January 2, 1963, a day after his last appearance on his program The Dick Powell Show aired, Dick Powell died of stomach cancer. The stomach cancer was likely a result of having directed Howard Hughes's The Conqueror, amidst dust clouds of atomic test radiation in Utah. Out of a cast and crew of 220 people, 91 contracted various forms of organ cancers by 1981, including stars John Wayne, Susan Hayward and Agnes Moorehead.

An ad executive named Thomas McDermott was brought in to run the studio for Niven, Boyer, and Powell's family. But without Powell's vision, the studio went into a period of decline. Within two years after Powell's death, Four Star had decreased to only five programs on the air. After another two years, all but one had gone off the air; The Big Valley was the only show left. Aaron Spelling began his career at Four Star Television as a staff writer and after a number of hits began producing television shows for Four Star. Spelling left the studio in 1966 to form his own production company with Danny Thomas, Thomas-Spelling Productions. Similarity, Merrill Heatter and Bob Quigley, who started associating with Four Star in 1961, had split to form an independent production firm in 1966, which the Heatter-Quigley company was sold to Filmways in 1969.

For a brief time, Four Star Television owned Valiant Records, but sold the label to Warner Bros. Records in 1966, shortly after pop group The Association released their first records for the label. Early copies of the album And Then... Along Comes the Association show the Four Star disclaimer blacked out at the bottom of the label.

=== David Charnay's acquisition ===
From 1967 to 1989, David Charnay was the leader of a buyout group that owned a controlling interest in Four Star Television and subsequently renamed the company Four Star International. For more than two decades, he served as president, chief executive officer and chairman of the board of Four Star. He directed the company, employing his only son, John Charnay as Director of Public Relations, as well as employing many of Hollywood's leading producers, stars, and executives of the late 20th and early 21st century, including Deke Heyward, Morey Amsterdam, Dick Colbert, Tony Thomopoulos, and collaborating with Aaron Spelling and George Spota for continued film and television projects, as well as many Hollywood stars and starlets before many producers advanced to create their own companies. In 1970, the company partnered with Jack Barry Productions to produce game shows, which was split in early 1972. Among the partnered programs were the pilot The Honeymoon Game and two television shows The Reel Game and Juvenile Jury.

Four Star amassed a sizable inventory of programs for syndication, including The Rifleman, Wanted: Dead or Alive, The Rogues, Zane Grey Theatre and The Big Valley. While it did get a hit of sorts in producing a show called Thrill Seekers (a sort of proto-reality TV program, and the first reality show in the United States), the studio's primary niche was in its successful syndication to global film and television audiences. In 1983, Four Star acquired competing television syndicator Gold Key Entertainment. In 1985, Four Star renewed its ties with Charnay himself. During his tenure, they made a pact with Color Systems Technology to do a colorized version of Wanted Dead or Alive, which led to a lawsuit from Compact Video and Four Star against CST.

=== Final acquisitions: Compact Video, Ronald Perelman and Rupert Murdoch ===
By 1987, David Charnay had sold Four Star to Robert Seidenglanz's Compact Video Systems, which was then majority-owned by Ronald Perelman. After Compact Video shut down, its remaining assets, including Four Star, were folded into Perelman's MacAndrews and Forbes Incorporated. In 1989, Perelman acquired New World Entertainment and Four Star was merged into New World by April 1990. After Four Star International became part of New World, Four Star operated as in-name-only. In 1993, Four Star acquired 50% of Genesis Entertainment. As part of the acquisition, Genesis acquired television distribution rights to Four Star's 160 feature films and television series.

Four Star International is now owned by The Walt Disney Company, with most of its library of programs controlled by 20th Television as a result of the buyout between Rupert Murdoch and Ron Perelman in 1996.

=== Subsequent program ownership ===
With the subsequent sale of New World to 20th Century Fox (now owned by The Walt Disney Company) in 1997, the Four Star catalogue is now owned by Disney Platform Distribution, with a few exceptions:

- The Rifleman, which is now owned by its original co-production company Levy-Gardner-Laven Productions, and whose TV distribution rights are handled by the Peter Rodgers Organization
- Trackdown, which was co-produced with CBS, is now owned and distributed by CBS Media Ventures.
- Wanted Dead or Alive, which was also co-produced with CBS, was sold to Paravision International in October 1988 and now has its worldwide distribution rights handled by StudioCanal. American video distribution rights were handled by New Line Home Video (season 1), BCI Eclipse (season 2) and Mill Creek Entertainment (current reissues).
- The syndicated game show PDQ, which was co-produced with Heatter-Quigley Productions and distributed by Four Star, is now owned and distributed by MGM Television, through its ownership of the Heatter-Quigley library. (MGM inherited Heatter-Quigley, following MGM's purchase of Orion Pictures, whose predecessor Filmways had bought Heatter-Quigley in the late 1960s.)

== Programs ==
- Four Star Playhouse (1952–56) hosts Dick Powell, Ida Lupino, David Niven, Charles Boyer
- Dick Powell's Zane Grey Theatre (1956–61)
- Hey, Jeannie! (1956–57) starring Jeannie Carson
- Mr. Adams and Eve (1957–58) starring Ida Lupino & Howard Duff
- Richard Diamond, Private Detective (1957–60) starring David Janssen
- Trackdown (1957–59) starring Robert Culp (all rights and library owned by CBS Television Distribution)
- Black Saddle (1958–59) starring Peter Breck
- Wanted Dead or Alive (1958–61) starring Steve McQueen (all rights owned by StudioCanal with Mill Creek Entertainment owning video rights sub licensed from Warner Home Video)
- The Rifleman (1958–63) starring Chuck Connors (all Library and trademark rights owned by Levy-Gardner-Laven Productions, Inc.)
- The David Niven Show (summer 1959)
- The Detectives Starring Robert Taylor (1959–62)
- The DuPont Show with June Allyson (1959–61)
- Johnny Ringo (1959–60) produced by Aaron Spelling, starring Don Durant
- Wichita Town (1959–60) produced by Walter Mirisch, starring Joel McCrea and Jody McCrea
- Law of the Plainsman (1959–60) starring Michael Ansara
- The Westerner (1960) produced by Sam Peckinpah, starring Brian Keith
- Michael Shayne (1960–61) starring Richard Denning
- Dante (1960–61) starring Howard Duff
- The Law and Mr. Jones (1960–62) starring James Whitmore
- Stagecoach West (1960–61) starring Wayne Rogers
- The Tom Ewell Show (1960–61)
- Peter Loves Mary (1960–61) starring Peter Lind Hayes and Mary Healy
- Mrs. G. Goes to College (1961–62) starring Gertrude Berg and Cedric Hardwicke, renamed The Gertrude Berg Show at mid-season
- Target: The Corruptors! (1961–62) starring Stephen McNally and Robert Harland
- The Dick Powell Show (1961–63)
- Saints and Sinners (1962–63) starring Nick Adams & John Larkin
- The Lloyd Bridges Show (1962–63)
- McKeever and the Colonel (1962–63) starring Scott Lane, Allyn Joslyn & Jackie Coogan
- Ensign O'Toole (1962–63) starring Dean Jones
- Burke's Law (1963–65) / a.k.a. Amos Burke, Secret Agent (1965–66) Gene Barry
- People Will Talk (1963) host Dennis James, produced by Heatter-Quigley Productions
- Honey West (1965–66) starring Anne Francis & John Ericson
- The Rogues (1964–65) David Niven, Charles Boyer, Gig Young
- The Celebrity Game (1964) host Carl Reiner, produced by Heatter-Quigley Productions
- Hollywood a Go Go (1964–65)
- Shenanigans (1964–1965) host Stubby Kaye, produced by Heatter-Quigley Productions
- The Big Valley (1965–69) starring Barbara Stanwyck
- The Smothers Brothers Show (1965–66)
- PDQ (1965–69) host Dennis James, produced by Heatter-Quigley Productions
- Showdown (1966) host Joe Pyne, produced by Heatter-Quigley Productions
- Malibu U (1967), hosted by Rick Nelson
- Here Come the Stars (1968) host George Jessel
- Can You Top This? (1970), host Wink Martindale
- Juvenile Jury (1971–72), hosted and produced by Jack Barry
- The Reel Game (1971) hosted and produced by Jack Barry
- Monty Nash (1971–72) starring Harry Guardino, produced by Almada Productions, Inc.
- Thrill Seekers (1973–74) host Chuck Connors
- Mad Movies with the L.A. Connection (1985)
- Matchmaker (1987–88)
- Liar's Club (1988–89) host Eric Boardman
