= To Say the Least =

American television game show

- Presented by: Tom Kennedy
- Announcer: Kenny Williams
- Theme music composer: Stan Worth
- Country of origin: United States
- No. of seasons: 1
- No. of episodes: 143

Production
- Production locations: NBC Studios; Burbank, California
- Running time: 25 minutes
- Production company: Heatter-Quigley Productions

Original release
- Network: NBC
- Release: October 3, 1977 – April 21, 1978

To Say the Least is an American game show that aired on NBC from October 3, 1977 to April 21, 1978. The show was produced by Heatter-Quigley Productions, hosted by Tom Kennedy and announced by Kenny Williams.

== Format ==
Two teams, one consisting of men and the other women, competed. Each team consisted of one civilian player and two celebrities.

The object of To Say the Least was to guess the identity of subjects in as few words as possible. For each subject, one team member played while the other two were placed in isolation.

Both onstage players were shown a clue of six to ten words and the subject to which it referred. The players alternated choosing one word at a time to eliminate from the clue. At any time, either player could challenge the other team's offstage players to guess the subject, at which time they were brought back onstage and shown the clue. If the clue was reduced to a single word, the teammates of the player who eliminated the next-to-last word were forced to guess. Dashes were placed at the beginning and end of each clue so guessers had a rough idea of where the remaining words appeared in the full clue.

A correct answer won the game, while a miss awarded the win to the opposing team. The first team to win two games won the match, with $100 and a prize package awarded to the civilian player.

== All-Star Game ==
The winning contestant advanced with all four celebrities to play the All-Star Game for a chance at a cash jackpot.

Each of the celebrities stood behind one of four numbered doors on stage, assigned in random order, and the contestant was given the subject and a clue. The contestant eliminated all but three words in the clue, after which it was shown to the first celebrity so he/she could guess. A correct response won $100 for the contestant. The first celebrity and the contestant then chose another word to remove, and the second celebrity then took a guess that awarded an additional $200 to the contestant if correct.

Regardless of the outcome of these two guesses, the two celebrities and the contestant removed one more word and the remaining two celebrities were given a chance to guess, one at a time. If either of them guessed correctly, the contestant won a cash jackpot that started at $2,000 and increased by $1,000 for every game it went unclaimed.

Contestants remained on the show until they either lost two matches or played seven All-Star Games, whichever came first. Any contestant who won four consecutive matches received a new car.

== Broadcast history ==
To Say The Least was Tom Kennedy's third NBC show to debut in the span of one year; his first, 50 Grand Slam, was canceled after a 13-week run in December 1976 and was replaced by a daytime version of Name That Tune, which was canceled in June 1977 after 26 weeks.

The show aired at noon Pacific, and initially fared well in the Nielsen ratings against CBS' The Young and the Restless and ABC's The Better Sex, but when The $20,000 Pyramid took over the noon slot on ABC in early 1978, the ratings began to suffer, and To Say the Least was cancelled in April of that year, with reruns of Sanford and Son taking its place on the schedule.

== Episode status ==
One episode is held at The Paley Center for Media.
