= Heatter-Quigley Productions =

Defunct American television production company

- Type: Division
- Founded: December 1959
- Founders: Merrill Heatter; Bob Quigley
- Defunct: June 25, 1981
- Fate: Partnership dissolved, rebranded as Merill Heatter Productions
- Parent: Filmways (1969–1981)

Heatter-Quigley Productions was an American television production company that was launched in December 1959 by two former television writers, Merrill Heatter and Bob Quigley. After Quigley's retirement, the company became Merrill Heatter Productions.

== History ==
On many of Heatter-Quigley's most popular game shows, beginning with Video Village, a key element of the game was enlarged, and in some instances the entire game itself was magnified to larger than life.

- Video Village (later Shenanigans) employed a huge "living board game" motif that used contestants as tokens.
  (The popular late 1970s Canadian game show Mad Dash is similar to Video Village.)
- The Hollywood Squares featured a massive tic-tac-toe board
- High Rollers used an extra large pair of dice in a game similar to "Shut the Box"
- Gambit had a large deck of playing cards in a game of blackjack
- The Magnificent Marble Machine featured a gigantic pinball machine
- Hot Seat used an oversized lie detector

The company was formed in December 1959 by television writers Merrill Heatter and Bob Quigley. The former worked for Entertainment Productions, Inc., and the latter was a writer for the television show County Fair. Its first project they developed was Video Village, for the CBS television network. Kenny Williams was hired as announcer. Williams had met Quigley while working on the show County Fair, of which he was producing in 1959.

Nearly two years after the company was formed, in 1961, Heatter and Quigley entered into a partnership with Four Star Television to produce programming, and most of the assets were transferred to Four Star Television. In 1965, the team sparked a winner with a hit, PDQ, for syndicated markets funded by the NBC O&Os and it was a modest success.

The Heatter-Quigley company, which became an independent television production firm in 1966 after breaking up from Four Star Television, about three years following the death of Dick Powell, was the year that this company had created and aired a pilot episode of Hollywood Squares thru which Bert Parks was the moderator. The show was rejected by CBS, but NBC acquired broadcasting rights to the series, and Peter Marshall became the host.

In 1969, Heatter and Quigley sold the show, as well as the entire company to Filmways. In 1971, the company's fortunes grew when the company introduced a successful nighttime version of the company's flagship series Hollywood Squares, which was distributed by Rhodes Productions.

The company grew around in 1972, when Heatter-Quigley developed its own original children's game show, Runaround for NBC's Saturday morning schedule. The company also developed The Amateur's Guide to Love for CBS, which was a flop, as well as Gambit for CBS, which was a success, lasting for four years. The company scored another franchise winner in 1974 with High Rollers, which was also a success on NBC.

In 1975, Rhodes was sold to Filmways, making it a sister company to H-Q, and begin developing a nighttime syndicated version of High Rollers, which was unsuccessful in the ratings. Three years later, Rhodes broke from Filmways and Filmways launched its own syndicated company to take over syndication of Hollywood Squares, and also launched another syndicated series, Bedtime Stories.

In 1980, Heatter-Quigley's long running game show Hollywood Squares was cancelled by NBC, and the nighttime version became a 5 days a week strip with the return of Paul Lynde as production moved to Las Vegas.

In June 1981, Quigley retired and ended his partnership with Merrill Heatter just before Filmways was bought by Orion Pictures, therefore many of its team members were regrouped into Merrill Heatter Productions, an independent production company, and Filmways continue to own the pre-1981 title library made before the date. Quigley died on November 27, 1989. Heatter's first solo production was Battlestars, which made its debut on NBC in 1981.

Heatter continued solo and produced new game shows, such as Battlestars, All-Star Blitz, Bargain Hunters, and the 1987 version of High Rollers (with Orion Pictures subsidiary Century Towers Productions (who held the title rights to the pre-1981 Heatter library)). On September 28, 1999, Heatter leased the worldwide rights to his solo-developed game shows to King World for a limited time. That option has now expired. CBS Media Ventures currently owns the format rights to Hollywood Squares today, via CBS's acquisition of King World Productions in 2000.

MGM Television acquired the rights from Orion Television to Heatter-Quigley shows with the exception of Hollywood Squares (which is currently owned by CBS Media Ventures) and Wacky Races (which is currently owned by Warner Bros. Domestic Television Distribution (via Hanna-Barbera)). Orion had sold those rights to King World Productions after Orion closed its television division on November 25, 1991. Today, the rest of the Heatter-Quigley library are owned by Amazon MGM Studios (via Metro-Goldwyn-Mayer Television).

In 2008, Heatter returned to game show production with the GSN game show Catch 21, based on Gambit. Heatter is co-executive producer with another veteran producer, Scott Sternberg. Heatter died of cancer on October 8, 2017.

== Employees ==
Kenny Williams was the announcer on all of Heatter-Quigley's game shows except two: Temptation (announced by Carl King) and The Magnificent Marble Machine (announced by Johnny Gilbert); both shows were hosted by Art James.

Many hosts would become famous for the shows they did for HQ. Peter Marshall became most famous for The Hollywood Squares, Wink Martindale would have his first big hit with Gambit, and Alex Trebek would see his first hit in America (after a long run with Reach for the Top in his native Canada) with High Rollers.

== Titles by Heatter-Quigley Productions ==
- Video Village/Video Village, Jr. (1960–1962)
- Double Exposure (1961)
- People Will Talk (1963)
- The Celebrity Game (1964)
- Shenanigans (1964–1965)
- PDQ (1965–1969)
- Showdown (1966)
- Hollywood Squares/Storybook Squares (1966–1981 version)
- Temptation (1967–1968)
- Funny You Should Ask (1968–1969)
- Wacky Races (1968–1970, co-produced with Hanna-Barbera Productions, rights owned by Warner Bros. Domestic Television Distribution (via Hanna-Barbera and Warner Bros. Animation); the only non-game show produced by the company, although it was initially intended to have a game show element)
- Name Droppers (1969)
- Gambit (1972–1976)
- Runaround (1972–1973); a British version of this show aired 1975–81
- The Amateur's Guide to Love (1972)
- Baffle (1973), a revival of PDQ.
- All-Star Baffle (1974), Baffle with "civilian" contestants playing the bonus round, picked from the studio audience.
- High Rollers (1974–1976; 1978–1980)
- The Magnificent Marble Machine (1975–1976)
- Hot Seat (1976)
- To Say the Least (1977–1978)
- Bedtime Stories (1979)
- Las Vegas Gambit (1980–1981)

== Titles by Merrill Heatter Productions ==
- Battlestars (1981–1982)
- Fantasy (1982–1983) (co-produced by Earl Greenberg Productions and Columbia Pictures Television)
- The New Battlestars (1983)
- All-Star Blitz (1985) (co-produced by Peter Marshall Enterprises)
- Bargain Hunters (1987) (co-produced by Josephson Communications, Inc.)
- High Rollers (1987–1988) (co-produced by Century Towers Productions and syndicated by Orion Television Syndication)
- The Last Word (1989–1990) (syndicated by Turner Program Services)
- Hollywood Teasers (1993; unsold revival of All-Star Blitz, distributed by MCA TV)
- Catch 21 (2008–2011, 2019–2020) (co-produced by Scott Sternberg Productions)
