= Funny You Should Ask (1968 game show) =

- Genre: Game show
- Presented by: Lloyd Thaxton
- Announcer: Kenny Williams
- Theme music composer: Patrick Williams

Production
- Production company: Heatter-Quigley Productions

Original release
- Network: ABC
- Release: October 28, 1968 – June 27, 1969

Funny You Should Ask is an American television panel show that aired from 1968 to 1969 on ABC. Hosted by Lloyd Thaxton, it was a comedy game show featuring celebrities, and aired as part of a programming block that also included The Newlywed Game and The Dating Game. The series debuted on October 28, 1968, and was produced by Heatter-Quigley Productions.

Among the show's frequent celebrity guests were Jan Murray, Rose Marie, Stu Gilliam and Jim Backus. Additionally, many of the celebrities were fixtures on fellow Heatter-Quigley game show Hollywood Squares and several other Heatter-Quigley Productions shows.

The series is slightly related in format to the 2017 version of Funny You Should Ask, a game show produced by Allen Media Group (previously Entertainment Studios).

== Gameplay ==
The panel game was played with five celebrities facing two contestants.

In each round, the celebrities were asked a dilemma-type question to which they gave their own opinionated answers; meanwhile, the contestants were locked away in a soundproof room. When the contestants were released from isolation, they were given the same question for the first time. They were given the celebrities' answers in no particular order and chose which celebrity gave each answer. The contestants made their choices by pressing a button corresponding to the star they wished to choose. Each time either player chose the correct star, s/he scored a point; the player with the most matches after four answers won the round and a cash award which would be divided between both players in case of a tie. The winner of the first round earned $50. Winning round two won $100 and the third round awarded $200. By February 1969, the winner of each round won a $100 Spiegel gift certificate, which both players split in case of a tie.

If in any round a player matched four stars in a row, they won all the money in the "Funny Money Jackpot", which started at $100 and increased by $100 per round until won. The player with the most cash (later the most matches) at the end of the game won a special prize. If there was a tie, a "sudden death" question was asked to determine the champion. Whoever got it right won the prize.

== Running time ==
The series aired in a 25-minute time slot, and was followed by a 5-minute series titled The Children's Doctor. Since it was a daytime series, it featured more advertising than a prime time series of the same period, with a 1-minute commercial break about every 5 minutes (and plugs for the providers of prizes). The 2017 revival keeps the similar half-hour format, airing during the day and late nights.

== Availability ==
An episode appears on YouTube. Since the episode lacks a copyright notice, it also appears on the Internet Archive. The episode features Stu Gilliam, Rose Marie, Meredith MacRae, Marty Allen and Dean Jones. In addition, another four episodes are known to circulate among video collectors.

== Theme song ==
The theme song was later used by KPRC-TV in Houston, for their late-afternoon newscast The Scene at 5 (with Ron Stone and Doug Johnson), during the 1970s and early 1980s. It was also included in the 1980 film How to Beat the High Cost of Living.

The music is a variant of "Shades" by Patrick Williams, released in 1968.
