= The Magnificent Marble Machine =

American game show

- Created by: Merrill Heatter; Bob Quigley
- Presented by: Art James
- Announcer: Johnny Gilbert
- Country of origin: United States
- No. of episodes: 177

Production
- Running time: 30 minutes with commercials
- Production company: Heatter-Quigley Productions

Original release
- Network: NBC
- Release: July 7, 1975 – April 9, 1976

The Magnificent Marble Machine is an American television game show. Contestants partnered with celebrities to answer trivia questions and gain control of an oversized pinball machine. The program premiered on NBC on July 7, 1975 at 12:00 pm ET, replacing the game show Blank Check.

Merrill Heatter and Bob Quigley packaged the program, with Robert Noah as executive producer. Art James served as host, and Johnny Gilbert was the announcer. This is one of the few Heatter-Quigley programs that Kenny Williams was not involved with.

== Gameplay ==
Two contestants competed, one a returning champion, each paired with a celebrity partner. In the first half of the game, the teams had to identify the name of a famous person; place; thing; or title; frequently involving puns or other wordplay, that were displayed on a large electronic marquee, similar to one found on a pinball's backbox display. The players were shown blanks on the display's bottom line denoting the number of words and letters in the answer. A clue then crawled across the display's upper line. If no team buzzed in once the clue was revealed, letters of the answer then filled in at random as time progressed. For example, with the clue "He's center and he's square", and blanks displaying "#### #####", the correct answer is "Paul Lynde". James occasionally gave an additional clue before the main clue scrolled across the marquee.

For any given question, only the contestant or the celebrity was eligible to buzz in. This alternated with each question, and was indicated by lighted panels in front of the eligible player. Correct answers each scored one point. Five points won the game, and the winning team played "The Magnificent Marble Machine" in the bonus round. Later in the show's run, the rules were changed, so that it took only four points to win.

=== Bonus round ===
The winning team played the show's centerpiece: a giant pinball machine measuring 20 feet high and 12 feet long; the bottom of the machine was 3 feet from the ground, similar to a typical pinball machine.

To start each bonus, a plunger was pulled to launch a giant pinball into the machine. The team member who launched the ball would also man a button on the right side of the machine while the other would do so on the left side. These buttons controlled the machine’s flippers, of which there were four (two at the bottom of the machine and two in the middle). Two pinballs were played, with the champion launching the first ball and the celebrity launching the second after the teammates switched positions.

The team accumulated points by hitting bumpers, noisemakers and lights with the ball. Hitting any of the seven large numbered bumpers won the contestant a prize, with bumpers two and three together earning a larger prize, such as a car or trip. At some point during the series, a bonus prize was added for hitting all seven numbered bumpers at least once.

Originally, each bumper and other noisemakers scored 200 points. Producers audited the score by watching the tape to ensure that each scoring feature had registered, but scoring errors increased week by week as the machine aged. The rules were eventually altered so that only the seven "thumper bumpers" added 500 points for each hit, with nothing else scoring. There were also two “out holes”, one at the center of the machine and one in between the bottom flippers.

Each portion of the bonus was played until either the ball fell into one of the out holes or sixty seconds had elapsed. Once the time limit expired, the flippers stopped functioning. However, the ball would continue to score points for each bumper and noisemaker it hit until it eventually fell out of play. If the team managed to hit the target score at any point, the round continued until seven bumpers were hit or time ran out.

==== Money ball ====
If a team reached the target score after playing two balls, the team played a bonus "gold money ball" in which the player earned $200 for each noisemaker and bumper. The goal was originally 15,000 points for each new champion, and lowered by 1,000 for each return visit. Later, the goal started at 13,000 points, and the money ball earned $500 for each bumper hit.

At some point in the run, this round was redesigned to be a multi-player "money ball marathon" rather than a bonus round any player might be able to achieve in any one play of the machine. The contestant achieving the top point score over a two-week period was awarded a money ball round. This format lasted for five marathons (ten weeks), after which the money ball was dropped from the game altogether.

After the money ball round was removed, the electronic point counters on the pinball machine were covered over. Contestants then only played for prizes obtained by hitting the seven bumpers and hitting all seven bumpers won a $5,000 bonus.

==== Format change ====
In early 1976, and continuing for the remainder of the run, game play changed to feature two teams of two celebrities each playing the front game. The winning team headed to the machine. One celebrity drew a name from the drum (filled out by the studio audience) and the lucky person played the bonus round with each celebrity.

The bonus round returned to having a goal, which was fixed at 10,000 points for each playing. The rules that were in place before the format change were reinstated; points could only be scored by hitting the thumper bumpers, hitting all seven won the audience member the bonus prize, and the money ball round returned to the game.

== Production ==
The set and pinball machine were designed by Jim Newton after studying several 1960s pinball machines. The back of the machine had seven windows with a geometric design to indicate the seven prizes and a score display. The set with the giant pinball machine took 60 days to build, taking over 2,000 man hours and overseen by NBC's manager of scenic operations, Anton Schaub.

The marbles were repainted after each taping session.

When the set was dismantled, Jim Newton retained one flipper, and one ball.

== Broadcast history ==
The Magnificent Marble Machine aired in its original time slot until November 28, 1975. On December 1, 1975, the series replaced Three for the Money at 12:30 PM so Wheel of Fortune could expand to an hour. With the move, Marble was reduced in length to 25 minutes as a national newscast anchored by Edwin Newman aired at 12:55.

After the January 2, 1976 broadcast, the show was pulled from the schedule for two weeks. When Marble returned on January 19, it changed to an all-celebrity format, which finally brought on its demise. While the last first-run episode aired April 9, its replacement, The Fun Factory, was postponed because of a technicians' strike, resulting in repeats airing through June 11.

== In popular culture ==
A brief clip from The Magnificent Marble Machine is seen in the 1979 film The China Syndrome, as the "regularly scheduled programming" that the TV station interrupts to show the main character's report from inside the power plant. The clip shows celebrity guest Gary Burghoff playing a normal ball on the machine, though the original audio is dubbed over with music (Note: written by composer Michael Small and included on the film's soundtrack release ("Source Suite #1")) composed for the film. The film's credits do not mention the show, Burghoff or Heatter-Quigley.
