= Funny You Should Ask (2017 game show) =

American 2017 game show

- Genre: Game show
- Created by: Byron Allen
- Presented by: Jon Kelley
- Narrated by: John Cramer
- Opening theme: "Happy" by Pharrell Williams (season 1)
- Country of origin: United States
- Original language: English

Production
- Executive producers: Byron Allen; Scott Satin; Bob Boden
- Camera setup: Multi-camera
- Running time: 22 minutes
- Production company: Allen Media Group

Original release
- Network: Syndication
- Release: September 4, 2017 – 2026
- Network: CBS
- Release: May 22, 2026 – present

Related
- Funny You Should Ask (1968 game show); Comics Unleashed

Funny You Should Ask is an American television comedy game show that launched in 2017. It originally aired in syndication during daytime and nighttime programming, before being added to the late-night schedule on CBS in 2026. It is distributed by Allen Media Group (previously Entertainment Studios) and hosted by Jon Kelley.

The panel show is slightly related in format to the 1968 version of Funny You Should Ask (which was broadcast on ABC) and Hollywood Squares. The series airs two half-hour episodes together, which features various comedians and actors.

== Production ==
"Happy" by Pharrell Williams was used as the game show's theme song for its first season, then a similar-sounding tune from the second season onward. Darren Capozzi has served as the warm-up comic.

Funny You Should Ask was renewed into the 2022–23 season, for a total of six syndicated seasons (new episodes were produced during the first four seasons). It was the second double-season renewal, the first being in 2018. In May 2025, Deadline Hollywood reported it was renewed for season nine and ten. Production resumed on August 11, 2026, and new episodes began on September 21. Over 450 episodes were produced during nine seasons, with the landmark 500th episode planned for taping during winter.

CBS previously presented four episodes during prime time on December 9, 2023. It also began streaming on Paramount+ in December 2023. The show airs on AMG's cable television channel Comedy.TV and originally aired via first-run syndication. Repeat episodes continue to broadcast on multiple network-owned affiliates and other TV channels, including TheGrio. Full episodes are also available to watch on YouTube and the show's website.

On May 23, 2026 (overnight May 22), FYSA was moved to CBS nationally. It replaced the 12:37 a.m. late-night slot previously occupied by AMG's Comics Unleashed, which moved to 11:35 p.m. following the cancellation of The Late Show with Stephen Colbert. Two half-hour episodes air back-to-back to fill the one hour time slot. The arrangement is part of a one year time-buy agreement between Allen Media Group and CBS.

=== Panel of comedians and actors ===
Regular or frequent comics and actors on the panel game have included: Jon Lovitz, Louie Anderson, Bill Bellamy, Sheryl Underwood, Tim Meadows, Jackée Harry, Jimmie Walker, Howie Mandel, Cedric the Entertainer, Caroline Rhea, Natasha Leggero, Bill Engvall, Cheryl Hines, Gabriel Iglesias, Anthony Anderson, Maz Jobrani, Jamie Kennedy, Jodi Miller, Billy Gardell, Pauly Shore, Whitney Cummings, Dave Coulier, Sherri Shepherd, Tom Arnold, Tiffany Haddish, Kathy Griffin, Loni Love, Tommy Davidson, Vivica A. Fox, Raven-Symoné, Jeff Ross, Adam Carolla, Brad Williams, Gary Owen, David Alan Grier, Margaret Cho, Bobby Lee, George Wallace and Jay Mohr, among others. Byron Allen, the creator and executive producer of the show, began appearing permanently.

Lovitz (lower left stage) and Allen (upper right stage) are regular panelists. Louie Anderson (lower right stage) was a regular before his death. Mandel and Carolla usually occupied the seat he sat in, which bears a plaque marked "Louie's Chair" on the left arm. The middle chairs on each row are occupied by female panelists, with the celebrity in the upper-left chair rotating. After 2025, Lovitz was most often replaced with comedians Carolla, Gardell or Kennedy during his absence and after his departure.

== Gameplay ==
In each round, the celebrities are asked a trivia question one at a time, going left to right in the bottom row, then in the top row. The comedians give an obvious "joke" answer before giving a legitimate response. One contestant is asked if the answer given by the panelist is correct or incorrect. If the contestant guesses correctly, they earn $100 in round one, $200 in round two, and $300 in round three.

A coin flip before gameplay determines who plays first in round one. In subsequent rounds, whoever is behind (or went last, if the contestants are tied) goes first. Six questions are asked in each of the first two rounds, while the third round is played until a bell sounds (some celebrities may not be asked a question if a contestant cannot catch up). Whoever has earned more money keeps their winnings, and has a chance to win an additional $5,000 in the "Big Money" Bonus Round. Before the show is recorded, a numerical question related to one of the celebrities is asked of both contestants. If the score is tied, whoever gives the closest answer wins the game.

=== "Big Money" Bonus Round ===
In the bonus round, three multiple choice questions are asked to which the celebrities give answers, only one of which is true. The questions get progressively harder and more answers are given for each successive question: three for the first, four for the second and six for the third and final question (with the last answer always being an obvious "joke" answer). The champion, if successful, wins $5,000. However, if any question is missed, the bonus round ends.
