= Video Village =

US television program

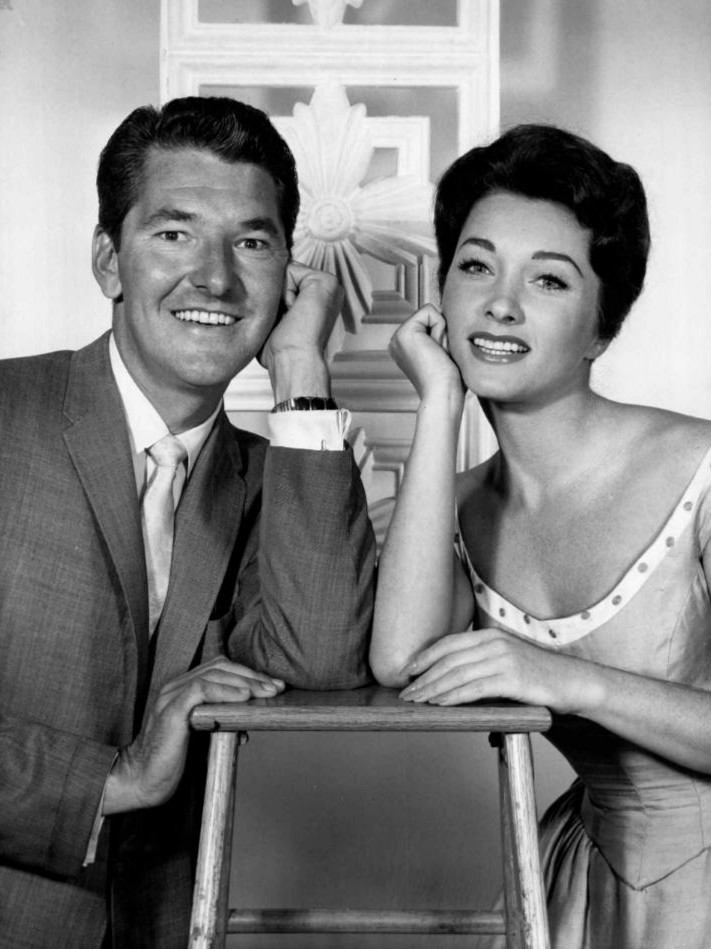
- Jack Narz and Joanne Copeland, 1960.
- Presented by: Jack Narz; Red Rowe; Monty Hall
- Announcer: Kenny Williams
- Country of origin: United States
- No. of seasons: 2
- No. of episodes: 12 (1960 primetime); 501 (1960–1962 daytime)

Production
- Producers: Merrill Heatter and Bob Quigley (Heatter-Quigley Productions)
- Running time: 30 Minutes

Original release
- Network: CBS
- Release: July 1, 1960 – June 15, 1962

Video Village is an American television game show produced by Heatter-Quigley Productions, which aired on the CBS network in daytime from July 11, 1960, to June 15, 1962, and in primetime from July 1 to September 16, 1960. It was notable for the use of its unique "living board game" concept and for premiering soon after the quiz show scandals. The concept was envisioned in December 1959 when the two met.

== Personnel ==
Jack Narz served as the host (introduced on-air as "the Mayor") from the show's premiere until September 9, 1960, after which he departed for personal reasons. Red Rowe filled in as Mayor for the week of September 16 (including the final nighttime episode); the following Monday, Monty Hall replaced Narz and hosted through the remainder of the show's run.

Kenny Williams served as the announcer (the "town crier") throughout the show's run. Joanne Copeland served as the show's original hostess during the time it originated from New York City. Shortly after Hall joined the show and Heatter-Quigley moved it to CBS Television City in Hollywood, California, Copeland was replaced by Eileen Barton.

== Rules ==
Two contestants played the role of tokens on a human-sized game board with three streets: Money Street, Bridge Street, and Magic Mile. Players advanced according to the roll of a large six-sided die in a chuck-a-luck, rolled on the sidelines by a partner (almost always a spouse or boyfriend/girlfriend) and called out by announcer Williams. After Video Village moved to California, the die was replaced by an electric randomizer. Any time players landed on the space their opponent was on, they could either take an extra turn or force their opponent to return to the beginning of that street.

The squares changed throughout the show's run, but some of the more notable ones included:

- Money squares: Located on Money Street, these spaces awarded their marked value ($5 to $20) to any contestant who landed on them.
- Bus Stop, Do It Yourself and Take A Chance: Players landing on any one of these spaces drew a card and followed its instructions.
- Jail: Located between Money Street and Bridge Street. Contestants could be sent here either by landing on a "Go to Jail" space or drawing a card that instructed them to do so. In order to get out, they had to correctly predict whether their next roll would be even or odd.
- Ask the Council: Located on Money Street and Magic Mile, the contestant was asked a humorous, open-ended question. He/she won cash if the audience — acting as the "council" — was judged to agree.
- Finders Keepers: The first player to land on this space won a prize that was tangentially connected to a joke item placed on the path (e.g. a loaf of bread symbolizing "dough" for the player as a cash bonus).
- Shops: Located on the Magic Mile, these were five themed "stores" (Bank, Appliance Store, Jewelry Store, etc.), which each contained a prize. The first contestant to land on the store's space won that prize.
- Safety Zone: Any players landing here are safe from any penalty imposed by their opponent.
- 1-2-3 Go: Any player landing on this space remained on it until getting a 1, 2, or 3.
- Exchange Places: The last square on the board before the two Finish spaces at the end of Magic Mile. Any contestant landing here had to trade places with his/her opponent.

The first contestant to reach either of the two "Finish" spaces (they had to do so by an exact roll) won the game and the right to return to play in the next game. Both contestants kept the cash and prizes they accumulated.

== Spin-offs ==
A spin-off, Video Village Junior (sometimes also called Kideo Village), aired on Saturday mornings from September 30, 1961, to June 16, 1962; it was essentially the same game, except with children participating as the contestants (and a parent serving as their "significant other"). Its last episode aired the day after Video Village concluded its run.

Two years following Village's cancellation, a new Saturday-morning kids' show, Shenanigans, premiered with game play similar to that of Village. It aired on ABC in 1964 and 1965, and was also a Heatter-Quigley production. The host was Stubby Kaye and the announcer was Kenny Williams (appearing as Kenny the Cop), who had also been the announcer on Village. Like Village, a board game based on the show was manufactured by Milton-Bradley.

== Episode status ==
The series is believed to have been destroyed as per network practices of the era. Four episodes are known to survive – the second nighttime episode, an episode guest-hosted by Rowe (also the final nighttime show), the 500th daytime episode, and the third-to-last episode of Video Village Junior.

== Foreign versions ==
An Australian version, based on Video Village Junior, was in production from 1962 to 1966, made by Crawford Productions for HSV-7. It was hosted by Danny Webb with Elizabeth Harris and Chris Christensen (later replaced by Vic Gordon). Each episode of the show ended with children singing a song. A similar concept was later used in the Canadian game show The Mad Dash, which aired on CTV from 1978 to 1985. Also similar have been Italian and Spanish language game shows named for and in imitation of the game of the goose.

== Board game ==
In 1960, Milton Bradley, Chad Valley Co Ltd, and John Sands Pty Ltd released a board game "home version" of the game. It used roll and spin and move mechanisms and its rules closely matched those of the television program. The game proved popular enough that Milton Bradley continued to sell copies even after the show had been cancelled. Funfair Games, John Sands Pty Ltd, and Milton Bradley's Boob Tube game was also released as a Video Village tie-in in 1962.

== Music ==
Music for the show was provided by a live combo led by musical director Sid Wayne, consisting of organ, drums, xylophone, and bass. Additionally, when Monty Hall became host, the "Village Bus", a golf cart-like vehicle, was added to shuttle contestants from the finish line back to start at the conclusion of the game. While driving it, hostess Eileen Barton and he would sing "The Village Bus Song", added to showcase both hosts' musical abilities.
