= High Rollers =

American game show

- Title card from the 1987-88 syndicated series
- Genre: Game show
- Directed by: Jerome Shaw
- Presented by: Alex Trebek; Wink Martindale
- Announcer: Kenny Williams; Dean Goss
- Theme music composer: Stan Worth (1974–80); Score Productions (1987–88)
- Country of origin: United States
- No. of episodes: 494 (1974–76 version); 560 (1978–80 version); 185 (1987–88 version)

Production
- Executive producers: Merrill Heatter; Bob Quigley
- Producer: Robert Noah
- Production locations: NBC Studios; Burbank, California (1974–80); Television City Studios; Hollywood, California (1987–88)
- Running time: approx. 26 minutes
- Production companies: Heatter-Quigley Productions (1974–80); Merrill Heatter Productions (1987–88); Century Towers Productions (1987–88)

Original release
- Network: NBC
- Release: July 1, 1974 – June 11, 1976
- Release: April 24, 1978 – June 20, 1980
- Network: Syndicated
- Release: September 14, 1987 – September 9, 1988

High Rollers is an American television game show created by Merrill Heatter. Two contestants compete to answer trivia questions and gain control of an oversized set of dice, which they then roll to eliminate the numbers 1 through 9 from a game board in order to win cash and prizes. It is an adaptation of the standard dice game shut the box.

High Rollers debuted on July 1, 1974, as part of NBC's daytime lineup. In September 1975, an accompanying series was launched in syndication and aired once weekly on local stations. Both of these series ended in 1976, with the daytime series ending on June 11, 1976. Alex Trebek was the host for these series. On April 24, 1978, NBC brought High Rollers back with Trebek hosting and aired it until June 20, 1980, when it was one of three series cancelled to make room for The David Letterman Show. The series was produced by Heatter-Quigley Productions. From 1987 to 1988, a second revival aired in syndication, hosted by Wink Martindale.

== Gameplay ==
=== Basics ===
Two contestants competed. The object was to remove the digits 1 through 9 from a game board by rolling an oversized pair of dice. To determine who gained control of the dice, the host asked a toss-up question. The answers were usually multiple-choice, true/false, or yes/no. The first contestant to buzz in received the chance to answer, and answering correctly won control. If that contestant did not answer correctly, control went to the opponent.

Once in control, a contestant could either roll the dice or pass them to the opponent. After rolling, the contestant had to remove one or more digits from the board that added up to the total on the dice. For example, if a 10 were rolled, the contestant could remove any available combination that added up to that number: 1–9, 2–8, 3–7, 4–6, 1–2–7, 1–3–6, 1–4–5, 2–3–5, or 1–2–3–4, providing that none of the digits within the combination had already been removed. Contestants banked prizes by removing individual numbers or combinations of them, depending on the rules.

A "bad roll" occurred if the total showing on the dice did not correspond with any combination of the digits still in play. Contestants making a bad roll immediately lost the game unless they had an insurance marker (see below). A contestant clearing the last digit from the board won the game. The winner of each game received any prizes that were banked, or $100 if no prizes had been banked. The first contestant to win two games won the match and advanced to the Big Numbers bonus round.

==== 1974–76 ====
The original series featured a prize or cash amount hidden under every digit on the gameboard, revealed and added to a contestant's bank only when that digit was removed. Two digits each contained one-half of a large prize, usually a new car, boat, or a luxury vacation. To bank this prize, both cards had to be uncovered by the same contestant. If the contestants each revealed one of the two cards, the prize was taken out of play for that game.

During the final seven weeks of the first daytime version (April 26 – June 11, 1976), the main game was known as "Face Lifters". Digits were arranged in a 3×3 grid and concealed a picture of a famous person. A contestant won the game by correctly identifying the person in the picture. A contestant could take a guess after making a good roll. If a contestant made a bad roll, the opponent was allowed one guess for each remaining digit in the picture. A successful guess won the game plus the prizes belonging to the digits still on the board. If neither contestant guessed the identity correctly, Trebek gave clues until one contestant buzzed in with the answer.

A co-hostess (Ruta Lee, daytime and Elaine Stewart, nighttime) rolled the dice for the contestants. The contestants sat along the long side of the dice table opposite from Trebek. No insurance markers were given in the main game; a bad roll meant an automatic loss.

A syndicated version with almost identical rules ran weekly in the 1975–76 season. Each episode featured the same two contestants competing for the entire show. After the first few episodes, the rules were changed so that rather than requiring contestants to win a two-out-of-three match, the winner of each game played the Big Numbers, and the losing contestant returned for another game. The contestants played as many games as possible until time was called. If this happened during a game, the one who had removed more digits won the final game and any prizes accumulated. Under the two-out-of-three game format used in the first few episodes, the contestant also had another chance at the Big Numbers. Like other weekly nighttime game shows at that time, this version had no returning champions.

==== 1978–80 ====
When the series was revived in 1978 (and originally titled The New High Rollers), the board consisted of three columns with three randomly assigned digits apiece. Each column contained one or more prizes, which were only banked by the contestant who removed the last digit from a column (regardless of who removed the others). The prizes were typical game-show gifts (furniture, appliances, trips, etc.). Prizes that were banked but not won during a game were returned to their columns. One new prize was added per column at the beginning of each game, to a maximum of five. When the prizes in a column were won, a new one was placed in that column for the next game. At least one column in each game was designated as a "hot column", meaning that all three of its digits could be cleared with a single roll of the dice (e.g. 1-3-6, which could be cleared with a roll of 10).

Insurance markers could be earned by rolling doubles. If a contestant made a bad roll with at least one marker, he/she turned it in and rolled again. A bad roll with no markers lost the game unless it was a double, in which case the contestant received an insurance marker and immediately turned it in for another roll. Insurance markers earned in the main game did not carry over to the Big Numbers nor to the next match.

This version had the contestants rolling the dice themselves.

==== 1987–88 ====
This version followed the rules of the 1978–80 version, but with only one prize available in each column. If any prizes were not won during a particular game, they were replaced. Frequently, one column offered a chance to play a special game if the contestant claimed it and won the round. For the special games described below, only one die was used.

- Around the World: Each number on a die corresponded to one of five available trips. Rolling a six won all five trips (i.e., a trip around the world) and a $5,000 cash bonus. Later, the $5,000 cash bonus was dropped.
- Cookie Jar: The contestant rolled a die and won $1,500 for a six, or $100 times any other number that came up. Also called "Trick or Treat" on the Halloween episode.
- Diamond Mine: Each number corresponded to a different item of jewelry, and the contestant won the item for the number rolled.
- Dice Derby: This game mimicked a horse race. One horse was designated with even numbers (2, 4 and 6), and the other odd numbers (1, 3 and 5). The contestant rolled the die and the appropriate horse moved one space depending on the outcome. The first horse to move four spaces on the track won the race and a prize for the contestant. The even horse carried a larger prize, which was usually a trip or car, and the odd horse awarded a smaller prize, such as a short vacation or $1,000.
- Driver's Test: The contestant controlled a game piece on a twelve space gameboard, arranged in a 4×4 ring of spaces. The contestant had six rolls of a die to make the piece land exactly on the "CAR" space, which was seven spaces away from the starting position. The piece always moved toward the "CAR" space. If a roll caused it to overshoot the target, the next roll had the piece reversing direction. Failure to win the car won the cash amount on the final resting space, up to $2,500.
- For Lovers Only: Each number represented a romantic vacation and the contestant won the trip represented by the number.
- Full House: Each number on a die corresponded to a different room of a house. The contestant won the room corresponding to the number rolled. However, if a contestant rolled a six, the contestant won all five rooms in the house.
- High Seas: Each number on a die represented a watercraft or a boat. The contestant won that prize represented by that number.
- Home Away From Home: Each number represented an RV of some type. The contestant wins that RV represented by that number.
- Island Hoppers: Each number represented an island vacation, and the contestant won the trip represented by the number rolled.
- It Takes Two: A different prize was assigned to each number on the die. The contestant continued to roll the die until repeating a number, winning the prize corresponding to that number. The game was sometimes called "It Takes Two: For the Famous and Rich."
- Love Letters: The contestant rolled a die up to six times to reveal letters in a six-letter word. Solving the word at any time won a new car. Otherwise, the contestant won $100 for every letter that was revealed.
- Lucky Numbers: The contestant chose a number between one and six, and then rolled the die. A correct hunch won the contestant a new car.
- Map Game: An earlier version of "Around The World" played similarly, except in this game rolling a six won a more expensive single-destination trip rather than a trip around the world.
- Millionaire Game: Each number one through six was worth a certain number of California Lottery tickets. Rolling the corresponding number won that number of tickets.
- Paris or Bust: The contest rolls a die and if the contestant rolls an even number, the contestant wins a trip to Paris. However, if the contestant rolls an odd number, the contestant wins nothing.
- Screen Play: Each number one through six was worth a TV set of some type. Rolling the corresponding number won that TV.
- Shop Till You Drop: The contestant rolls a die and the contestant wins a shopping spree worth $1,000 times the number on the die. However, if the contestant rolls a six, then the contestant wins a $10,000 shopping spree.
- Smiling Wink's Car Lot: Each number on a die represented a new car, except number six, which represented a "clunker," a used but operational car. The contestant rolled the die and won the car corresponding to the number rolled.
- Wild Wheels: The contestant rolled a die, and if the contestant rolled an odd number, the contestant won a new car. If a contestant rolled a two or a four, the contestant won 1,000 gallons of gas. However, if a contestant rolled a six, the contestant won two cars.
- Wink's Garage Sale: Six prizes, including a worthless gag gift, were available. Rolling a six won the gag gift.

=== The Big Numbers ===
The champion rolled the dice and attempted to remove the digits 1 through 9 from the board, with a large prize awarded for clearing them all. A larger game board, positioned to the contestant's right on the stage, was used, except on the 1978–80 series, which used the same board as the main game. Insurance markers were awarded for rolling doubles, with each marker giving the contestant another roll of the dice after making a bad roll. These markers did not carry over to the main game.

Contestants were awarded $100 for each digit removed from the board. In the earliest episodes of the 1974–76 version, contestants could stop and take this money after a good roll. A bad roll with no insurance markers, or eliminating all digits except for the 1, ended the game and forfeited the money. The contestant won a car for removing eight digits, and $10,000 for all nine. The rules were soon changed to eliminate the car bonus and allow the contestant to keep any accumulated money even after making a bad roll.

The 1978–80 version offered three top prizes at different times: a car plus $5,000 cash, the car alone, and the $5,000 alone. The 1987–88 version offered a prize of $10,000 and was played using a special pair of gold-colored dice.

The Big Numbers bonus round was also used on Las Vegas Gambit, which was hosted by future High Rollers host Wink Martindale and was also produced by Heatter-Quigley Productions, in 1981. The round used the same dice table as the 1978–80 version (complete with sound effects) and had the same rules, but the top award was an accumulating jackpot of prizes known as the "Gambit Galaxy."

Champions stayed on the show until they were defeated or until they won five matches (seven on the 1978–80 version). On the 1987–88 version, winning five matches originally won a new car but was later dropped by the time a contestant finally retired undefeated, which led to more cars being awarded in some of the mini-games played during the main game.

== Production information ==
=== Personnel ===
Alex Trebek and Wink Martindale served as hosts for High Rollers. Heatter-Quigley staff announcer Kenny Williams served as announcer for the Trebek versions. The 1987 series used Dean Goss as its announcer.

The 1970s editions of High Rollers were recorded at NBC's Burbank studio complex while the 1987 series taped at Studio 43 at CBS Television City in Hollywood.

Ruta Lee and Elaine Stewart were the prize models on the first High Rollers series, with Lee performing those duties on the daytime series and Stewart the weekly syndicated series. As noted above, both women were also the dice rollers for the contestants. Becky Price, Linda Hooks, and Lauren Firestone rotated as models during the 1978 revival while Martindale was assisted on his version by models Crystal Owens and KC Winkler.

=== Music ===
Stan Worth composed the theme for the 1974–76 and 1978–80 versions. In 1985, Score Productions composed a theme titled "Bubble Gum," originally for a failed Heatter pilot called Lucky Numbers (intended as somewhat of a revamp of this show with altered gameplay mechanics), which was reused for the 1987–88 version.

=== Merchandise ===
Two editions of home games were released in 1975, as Big Numbers: The High Rollers Game. The first edition was released by E. S. Lowe, while the second edition was released by Milton Bradley. Both versions have Trebek on the cover. A board game based on the 1987 version was released by Parker Brothers in 1988. The cover shows Martindale and two contestants during a game.

A computer game also based on the 1987 version was released for the Commodore 64, Apple II, and MS-DOS by Box Office in 1988. The cover has Martindale holding a pair of Golden Dice in his left hand while pointing to them with his right.

=== Episode status ===
Almost the entirety of both NBC daytime versions (1974-1976, 1978-1980) are believed to be lost due to NBC's practice of wiping at the time. A handful of episodes have survived and have appeared at times on YouTube. The status of the 1975-1976 syndicated version is unknown.

The 1987-1988 syndicated version is completely intact. Reruns of this version appeared as a part of the USA Network afternoon game show block from 1988 to 1991 and was the second Merrill Heather game show to be rerun on the network (All-Star Blitz was first) and it was also the first Century Towers Productions game show to be rerun on cable TV.

== International versions ==
An Australian version aired on the Seven Network for a brief period in 1975, hosted by Garry Meadows with Delvene Delaney and Suzanne Fox as the dealers. The announcer was Max Rowley. A Japanese version called SuperdiceQ, hosted by Masaru Doi, aired on TBS (Tokyo Broadcasting System) from 1980 to 1984.

Country	Name	Host	Network	Date premiered
Australia	High Rollers	Garry Meadows	Seven Network	1975
Japan	スーパーダイスQ; Sūpādaisu Q	Masaru Doi	TBS	March 3, 1980 – March 30, 1984
