= 1975–76 United States network television schedule (late night) =

These are the late-night schedules for the three U.S. television networks during the 1975–76 season. All times are Eastern and Pacific.

PBS is not included, as member television stations had local flexibility with most of their schedules, and broadcast times for network shows might have varied. ABC and CBS are not included on the weekend schedules because those networks did not offer late-night programs of any kind on the weekend.

Talk/Variety shows are highlighted in yellow, Local News & Programs are highlighted in white.

== Monday-Friday ==
-		11:00 PM	11:30 PM	12:00 AM	12:30 AM	1:00 AM	1:30 AM	2:00 AM	2:30 AM	3:00 AM	3:30 AM	4:00 AM	4:30 AM	5:00 AM	5:30 AM
ABC	Fall	Local	Good Night America!			Local programming or sign-off
ABC	Winter	Local	ABC Late Night			Local programming or sign-off
CBS		local programming	The CBS Late Movie				Local programming or sign-off
NBC		local programming	The Tonight Show Starring Johnny Carson			The Tomorrow Show (to 2:00; Mon.-Thur.)/The Midnight Special (Fri)			local programming or sign off

== Saturday ==
-		11:00 PM	11:30 PM	12:00 AM	12:30 AM	1:00 AM	1:30 AM	2:00 AM	2:30 AM	3:00 AM	3:30 AM	4:00 AM	4:30 AM	5:00 AM	5:30 AM
NBC	Fall	local programming	Weekend / NBC's Saturday Night (Weekend ran on the first Saturday each month. NBC's SN ran on the other Saturday nights.)			local programming or sign-off
NBC	Winter	local programming	Weekend / NBC's Saturday Night (Weekend ran on the first Saturday each month. NBC's SN ran on the other Saturday nights.)			local programming or sign-off

== By network ==
=== ABC ===
New Series

- ABC Late Night
- Good Night America!

Not returning from 1974-75

- ABC's Wide World of Entertainment

=== CBS ===
Returning Series

- The CBS Late Movie

=== NBC ===
Returning Series

- The Midnight Special
- The Tomorrow Show
- The Tonight Show Starring Johnny Carson
- Weekend

New Series

- NBC's Saturday Night

Not returning from 1974-75

- The Weekend Tonight Show
