= The Last Word (game show) =

American game show

- Genre: Game show
- Presented by: Wink Martindale
- Announcer: Jennifer Lyall
- Countries of origin: United States; Canada
- No. of seasons: 1
- No. of episodes: 65

Production
- Production location: Vancouver, British Columbia
- Production companies: Merrill Heatter Productions; Turner Program Services

Original release
- Network: Syndicated; GTN (Canada)
- Release: September 18 – December 15, 1989

The Last Word is a game show seen in syndication in the United States and on the Global Television Network in Canada that was produced by Merrill Heatter Productions and ran for 65 episodes from September 18 to December 15, 1989, with reruns continuing until January 5, 1990. The host was Wink Martindale, and the co-host/announcer was Jennifer Lyall. It was taped in Vancouver, British Columbia. In the Los Angeles-produced pilot, Burton Richardson was the announcer, and Jana White operated the computer and acted as co-host. The show was distributed by Turner Program Services.

== Gameplay ==
Two teams consisting of a celebrity and a civilian contestant competed to guess group words that had something in common in order to win cash and prizes. The civilians received all winnings credited to their teams. Among the celebrities who appeared include Jill Whelan, Ted Lange, Susan Ruttan, and Gordon Jump.

=== Main game ===
A puzzle consisting of three rows of blanks was displayed, representing three related words, and one letter of each word was filled in at the outset. The player in control pressed a button to stop a randomizer that flashed around the board. If it stopped on an empty space, that letter was filled in and the player could either try to guess the word or pass control to the opponent. When a player guessed, the remaining letters were revealed one at a time, starting from the leftmost, until either they had all been revealed (indicating a correct guess) or a letter came up that differed from the guess. However, the final letter of any word remained hidden on an incorrect guess.

A correct guess awarded the option to either guess another word or pass, while an incorrect guess gave control to the opponent. If the randomizer stopped on a letter that had already been filled in, the player had to choose one unrevealed letter in any word to be filled in and the opponent took control.

The player who solved the last word won the puzzle, regardless of who solved the first two, and received prizes for the team based on the number of words he/she had solved in that puzzle. The first team to win two puzzles won the match and advanced to the bonus round. Only one person played for each team at any given moment; the first two puzzles were played by one celebrity and the opposing civilian, and the third (if necessary) was played by both civilians.

If time ran out in the middle of a puzzle, all the words were revealed and a new puzzle was played at the start of the next episode.

=== Bonus round: The 60 Second Challenge ===
The winning team had 60 seconds to solve 10 puzzles. For each puzzle, two one-word clues were given and the letters of a third word were revealed one at a time until only one letter remained. Multiple guesses were allowed from either member. The team won a $100 gift certificate for each correct answer, and solving all 10 won a prize package which had a new prize added to it for each attempt in which it was not won; the largest jackpot awarded during the show's brief run was $46,500.

The civilians switched celebrity partners after each bonus round, and the first civilian to win two matches became champion and remained on the show to face a new challenger, competing until they were defeated or held their title for a total of six matches, whichever came first.
