= Kenny Williams (announcer) =

American television announcer (1914–1984)

- Born: Kenneth Williams Fertig Jr. 12 April 1914; Edmonton, Alberta, Canada
- Died: 16 February 1984 (aged 69); Los Angeles, California
- Occupations: Actor, Game Show Announcer

Kenny Williams or Ken Williams (April 12, 1914 – February 16, 1984), born Kenneth Williams Fertig Jr. in Edmonton, Alberta, Canada, was an announcer for American television from the late 1940s to 1980s.

== Career ==
As a radio actor in the 1940s to 1950s, he appeared on shows such as X Minus One, where he played Rhysling on the episode "The Green Hills of Earth". He was also one of the announcers for the Buck Rogers radio program, among others.

He was best known as the announcer of many game shows produced by Merrill Heatter and Bob Quigley (including Hollywood Squares, High Rollers, Gambit, and others). He did one show for Mark Goodson-Bill Todman Productions, Two for the Money, in 1952. In 1959, he met Bob Quigley, while working on the television show County Fair, of which Williams worked as announcer, before starting Heatter-Quigley Productions later this year.

Williams appeared on screen as "Kenny the Cop" on Video Village and Shenanigans.

He died at home in Los Angeles, California, on February 16, 1984.
