= List of filming locations in the Vancouver area =

Vancouver, British Columbia has a large film and television production industry, which earned it the nickname "Hollywood North." It usually serves as a substitute location for other cities and locales. This is a list, arranged by region, of films and television series shot in the Lower Mainland, including several prominent filming locations in Greater Vancouver and the Fraser Valley, plus those in the adjoining Sea-to-Sky Corridor and Sunshine Coast regions.

== Village of Anmore ==
=== Buntzen Lake ===
- The 4400 (TV series)
- Dark Angel (TV series)
- Freddy vs. Jason
- Hot Rod
- It (1990 TV miniseries)
- Lake Placid (1999)
- Pathfinder
- Smallville (TV series)
- Supernatural (TV series)
- The X-Files (TV series)

== Bowen Island Municipality ==
- American Gothic
- Charlie St. Cloud
- Double Jeopardy
- The Fog
- Harper's Island
- The Russia House
- The Wicker Man

== Britannia Beach ==
- Are We There Yet?
- Final Days of Planet Earth
- Free Willy 3: The Rescue
- Hope Island
- Scooby-Doo 2: Monsters Unleashed
- Stargate SG-1 – "Thor's Hammer" episode
- The Magicians
- The Man in the High Castle (TV series)
- The X-Files

== Brunswick Beach ==
- Fear

== City of Burnaby ==
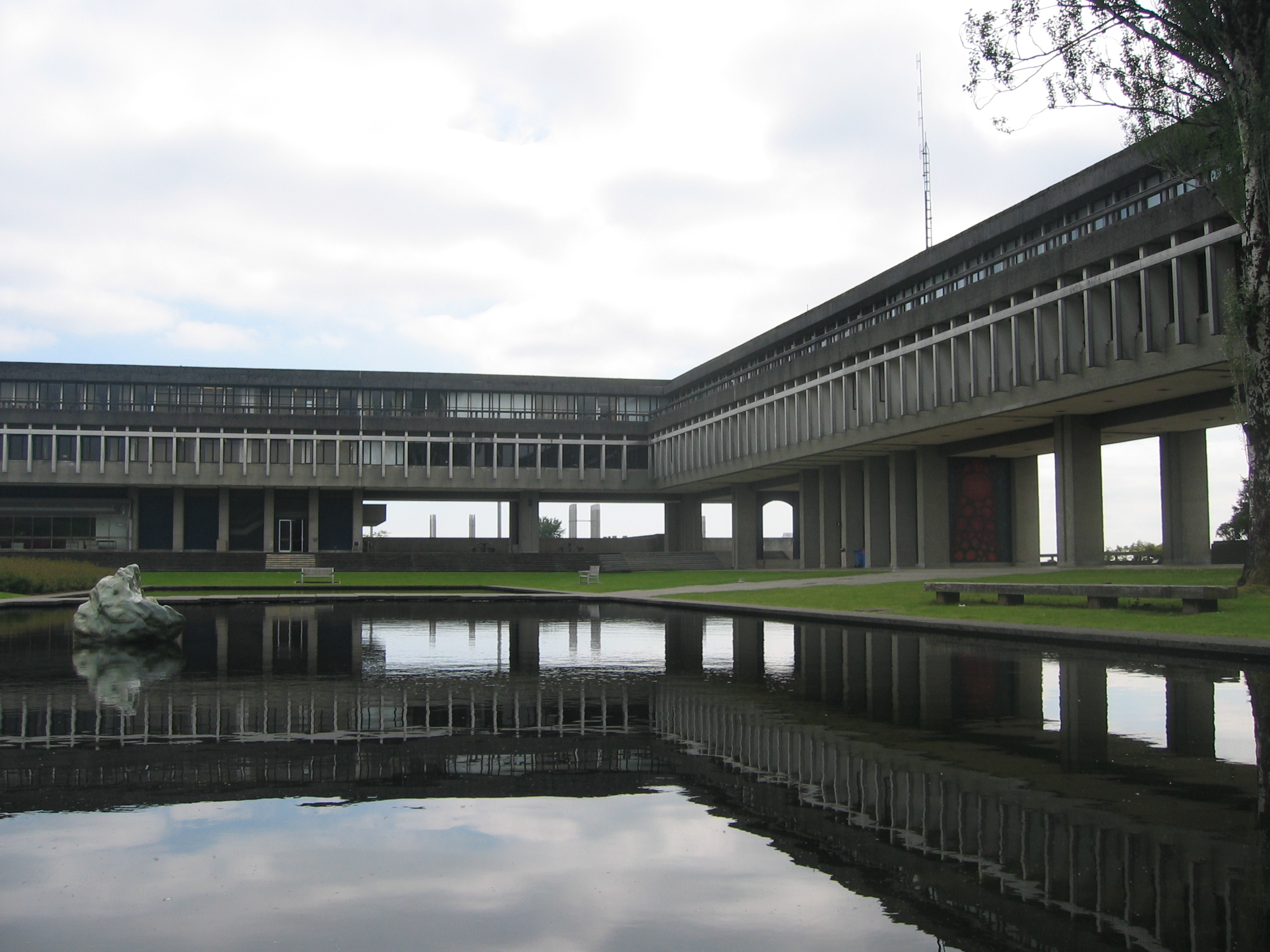
Simon Fraser University in Burnaby

=== The Bridge Studios ===
See The Bridge Studios article for full listing.

- Black Christmas (2006)
- John Tucker Must Die (2006)
- Juno (2007)
- Passengers (2007)
- Stargate Atlantis
- Stargate SG-1
- Stargate Universe

=== BB Studios (Beresford Street Studios) ===
- Arrow (TV series)
- The Flash (TV series)
- Smallville (TV series)

=== 7530 Buller Avenue, Burnaby, BC ===
- Smallville (TV series)
- Arrow (TV series)
- Batwoman (TV series)

=== First Avenue Studio ===
- Married Life

=== BCIT ===
- Supernatural

=== Burnaby City Hall ===
- Snakes on a Plane

=== Burnaby Hospital ===
- Stargate SG-1
- Supernatural
- White Noise

=== Burnaby Mountain ===
- My Life Without Me
- Stargate SG-1 (TV series)
- Wonder Park

=== Burnaby Mountain Secondary School ===
- The Invisible
- Riverdale (TV series)

=== Burnaby Village Museum ===
- Huckleberry Finn and His Friends (TV series)
- Supernatural

=== Central Park ===
- Juno
- New Moon
- Smallville (TV series)
- Stargate SG-1 (TV series)

=== Deer Lake Park ===
- The Day the Earth Stood Still
- Final Destination 3
- Life Unexpected
- Once Upon a Time (TV series)
- She's The Man
- Stakeout (Oakalla Prison)

=== Kent Hangar ===
- Elysium
- Mission: Impossible – Ghost Protocol
- Tomorrowland

=== National Nikkei Heritage Centre ===
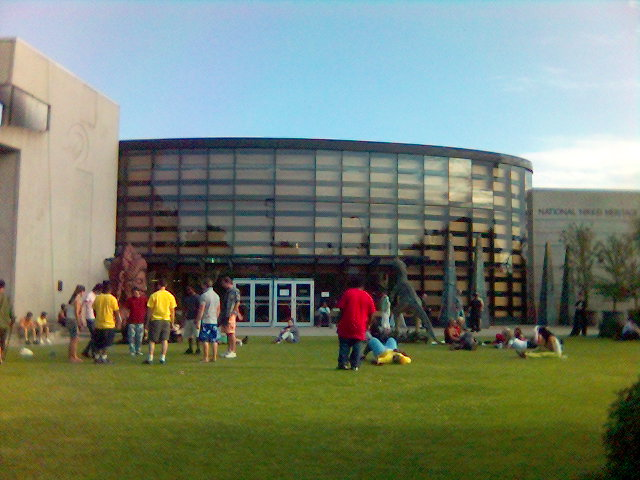
Extras outside the National Nikkei Heritage Centre during a break in filming Psych

- Psych (TV series)

=== Simon Fraser University (SFU) ===
- The 6th Day
- Agent Cody Banks
- Andromeda (TV series)
- Antitrust
- Battlestar Galactica
- The Day the Earth Stood Still
- Fallen
- The Fly II
- iZombie (TV series)- Blusson Hall
- Hellcats (TV series)
- jPod (TV series)
- Kyle XY
- Personal Effects
- She's The Man
- Spy Game
- Stargate SG-1 (TV series)
- Underworld: Awakening
- Viper (TV series)
- The X-Files (TV series)
- The Flash (2014 TV series)

=== Lougheed Town Centre ===
- 2Gether
- Breaking News
- Dead Like Me
- Duets
- Freddy Got Fingered
- I Was A Teenage Faust
- Just Deal
- Nightman
- Off Season
- Perfect Little Angels
- While She Was Out

=== Metrotown ===
- Life-Size
- The NeverEnding Story III

== City of Chilliwack and area ==
=== City Centre (Downtown) ===
- Eureka
- Monster Truck
- White Chicks

=== Cultus Lake ===
- Manhood
- Rampage
- Snakehead Terror
- Taylor's Way
- The Shack (2017 film)

== City of Coquitlam ==
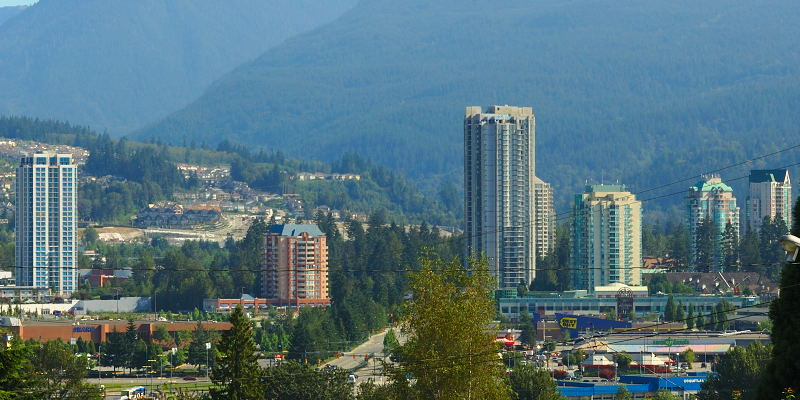
Coquitlam skyline

=== Chimo Aquatic and Fitness Centre ===
- Aliens vs. Predator: Requiem

=== Centennial Secondary School ===
- Aliens vs. Predator: Requiem
- American Pie Presents: Book of Love
- Psych

=== Coquitlam City Hall ===
- Da Vinci's Inquest (TV series) – court scenes are in the council chambers

=== Coquitlam Centre ===
- Christmas Bounty
- Grumpy Cat's Worst Christmas Ever
- Juno
- The Sisterhood of the Traveling Pants

=== Dawes Hill ===
- Hot Rod

=== Mundy Park ===
- Deck the Halls

=== Red Robinson Show Theatre ===
- Psych (TV series)

=== Riverview Hospital ===
- The Last Mimzy
- Second Chance (TV series)
- Crease Clinic:
  - The 4400 (TV series)
  - Battlestar Galactica (TV series)
  - Birdland (TV series)
  - Case 39
  - Dark Angel
  - Frankie & Alice
  - Fringe (TV series)
  - Halloween: Resurrection
  - Happy Gilmore
  - Human Target (TV series)
  - Jennifer's Body
  - Life Unexpected
  - Reefer Madness: The Musical
  - Romeo Must Die
  - Smallville (TV series)
  - Stargate: Atlantis
  - Supernatural (TV series)
  - X-Files (TV series)
- West Lawn:
  - Falling Skies
  - Grave Encounters
  - Grave Encounters 2
  - Jennifer 8

=== Quarry ===
- Stargate SG-1 (TV series)

=== United Boulevard (Fraser Riverbank) ===
- Arrow (TV series)

=== Various Locations ===
- The Day The Earth Stood Still

== Corporation of Delta ==
=== Alaksen National Wildlife Area ===
- Huckleberry Finn and His Friends (TV series)

=== Ladner ===
- The 6th Day
- Eureka
- The Experts
- Juno
- Josie and the Pussycats
- She's the Man
- Shooter
- This Boy's Life
- Three Moons Over Milford
- Trick 'r Treat

=== Tsawwassen ===
- Bird on a Wire
- Hellcats
- Jumanji
- Smallville (TV series)
- Supernatural (TV series)
- Totally Awesome
- X-Men: The Last Stand

=== Annacis Island ===
- Fantastic Four
- I, Robot
- Paycheck

== District of Hope ==
- Far from Home: The Adventures of Yellow Dog
- First Blood
- Shoot to Kill
- Suspicious River
- Sweet Virginia
- A Dog's Way Home

"Stick Up"

== Langley City ==
- The Butterfly Effect
- Flash Gordon (TV series)
- Rampage
- Whistler (TV series)

== Township of Langley ==
=== Aldergrove ===
- Bates Motel
- Bob the Butler
- Dragon Boys (filmed near Dawson Brill Lumber site)
- Smallville
- Twilight Saga (filmed in Township of Langley)

=== Fort Langley ===
- Air Bud: Spikes Back
- Alice, I Think (TV series) (filmed in South Langley near Campbell Valley)
- Are We There Yet?
- The Fog
- Gunless
- Home for Christmas
- Hope Springs
- Once Upon a Time (TV series)
- Riverworld
- Supernatural (TV series)
- Taken (TV series)
- The Vampire Diaries (TV series)
- Riverdale (TV series)
- Slither
- Jingle All The Way 2

== Village of Lions Bay and area ==
- Battlestar Galactica
- Caprica
- Elektra
- Whale Music
- Ozarks

== City of Maple Ridge ==
- Battle of the Bulbs
- BloodRayne II: Deliverance
- Bordertown (TV series)
- Merlin's Apprentice
- Percy Jackson and the Lightning Thief
- Rumble in the Bronx
- Stargate SG-1 (TV series)

=== Thornhill/Whonnock ===
- Jumanji

=== Ruskin ===
- Supernatural (TV series)

== District of Mission ==
- Percy Jackson & the Olympians: The Lightning Thief
- Horns
- Twilight: New Moon
- Riverdale (TV series)

=== Stave Falls Dam ===
- We're No Angels

=== Stave Falls Powerhouse (interior) ===
- Stargate: Atlantis
- Stargate: SG1

=== Ruskin Dam ===
- Dark Angel (TV series)
- The Invisible
- Smallville (TV series)
- The X-Files (TV series)

=== St. Mary's Indian Residential School ===
- Battlestar Galactica (TV series)

== City of New Westminster ==
=== Unknown / various ===
- The Exorcism of Emily Rose
- Final Destination 3
- Harry Tracy, Desperado
- Quantico (pilot; Criminal Minds, working title)
- Rumble in the Bronx (filmed on Front ST)
- Hostage Negotiator
- Once Upon a Time

=== 6th Street / Royal City Centre Mall ===
- Carpool

=== 3rd Street ===
- Bird on a Wire

=== Front Street / Downtown ===
- Blade
- Cats & Dogs: The Revenge of Kitty Galore
- I Love You, Beth Cooper
- I, Robot
- The Killing
- New Moon
- Shooter
- Short Time
- This Means War

=== Holy Trinity Cathedral ===
- Deck the Halls

=== The Metro Hall ===
- Supernatural

=== New Westminster Secondary School ===
- 21 Jump Street (TV series)

=== Paramount Theatre ===
- It (1990 TV miniseries)
- New Moon

=== Queen's Park ===
- Married Life
- Miracle

=== Old Terminal Pub ===
- Dead Like Me (TV series)
- Supernatural (TV series)
- Watchmen

=== Samson V ===
- Huckleberry Finn and His Friends (TV series)

=== Westminster Quay ===
- My Life Without Me

=== Woodlands Hospital ===
- Dark Angel (TV series)
- It (1990 TV miniseries)
- The X-Files (TV series)

== City of North Vancouver ==
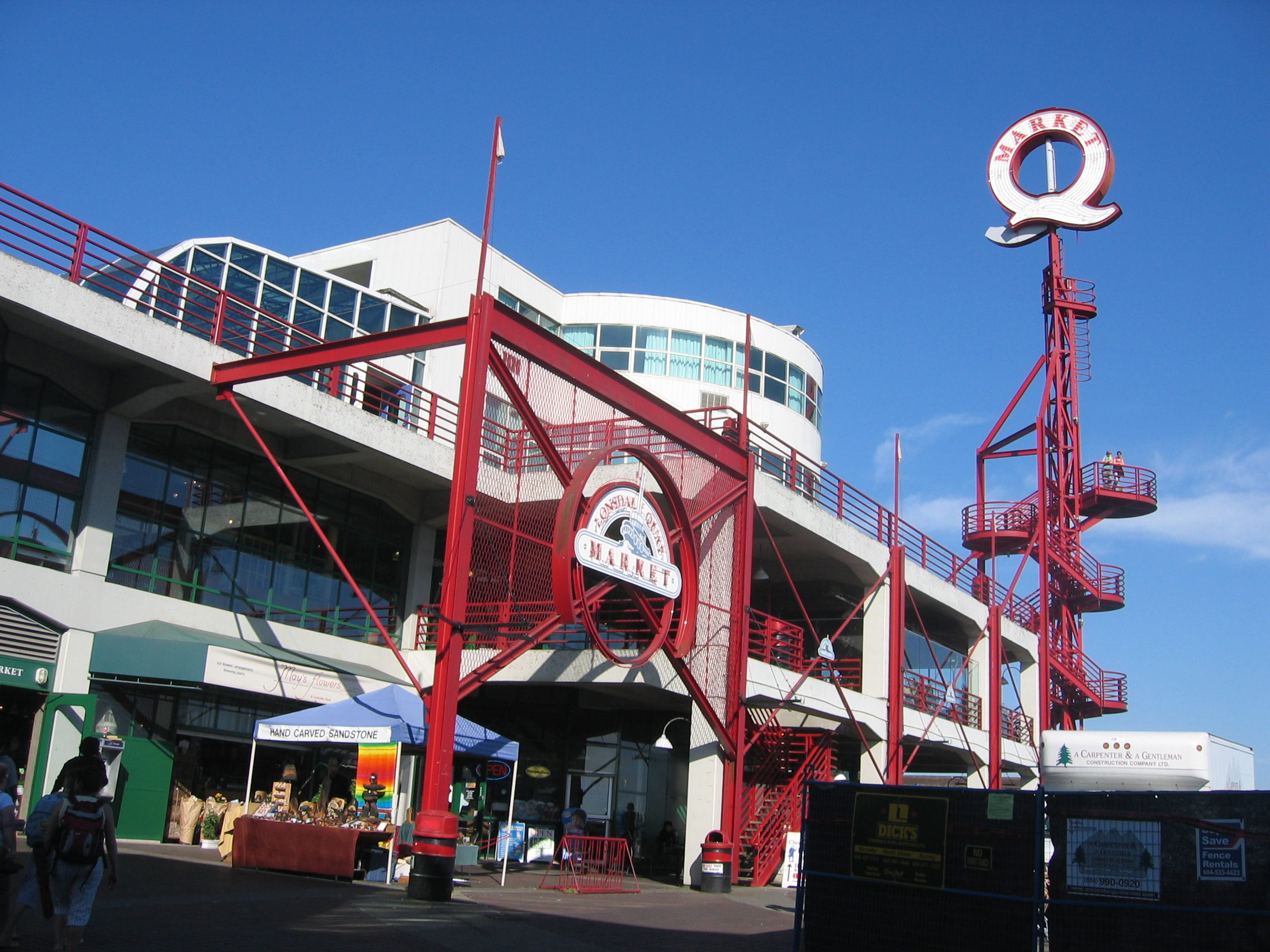
Lonsdale Quay in North Vancouver City

=== Boulevard Park ===
- The 4400 (TV series)
- Good Luck Chuck

=== Lonsdale Quay ===
- Agent Cody Banks
- Dead Like Me
- Tru Calling

North Shore Auto Mall sign

=== North Shore Park / North Shore Auto Mall ===
- Psych (TV series)

=== Pier 97 ===
- Fantastic Four

=== Neptune Terminals ===
- Stargate SG-1

=== Burrard Dry Dock Pier ===
- Fringe (TV series)

== District of North Vancouver (North Shore) ==
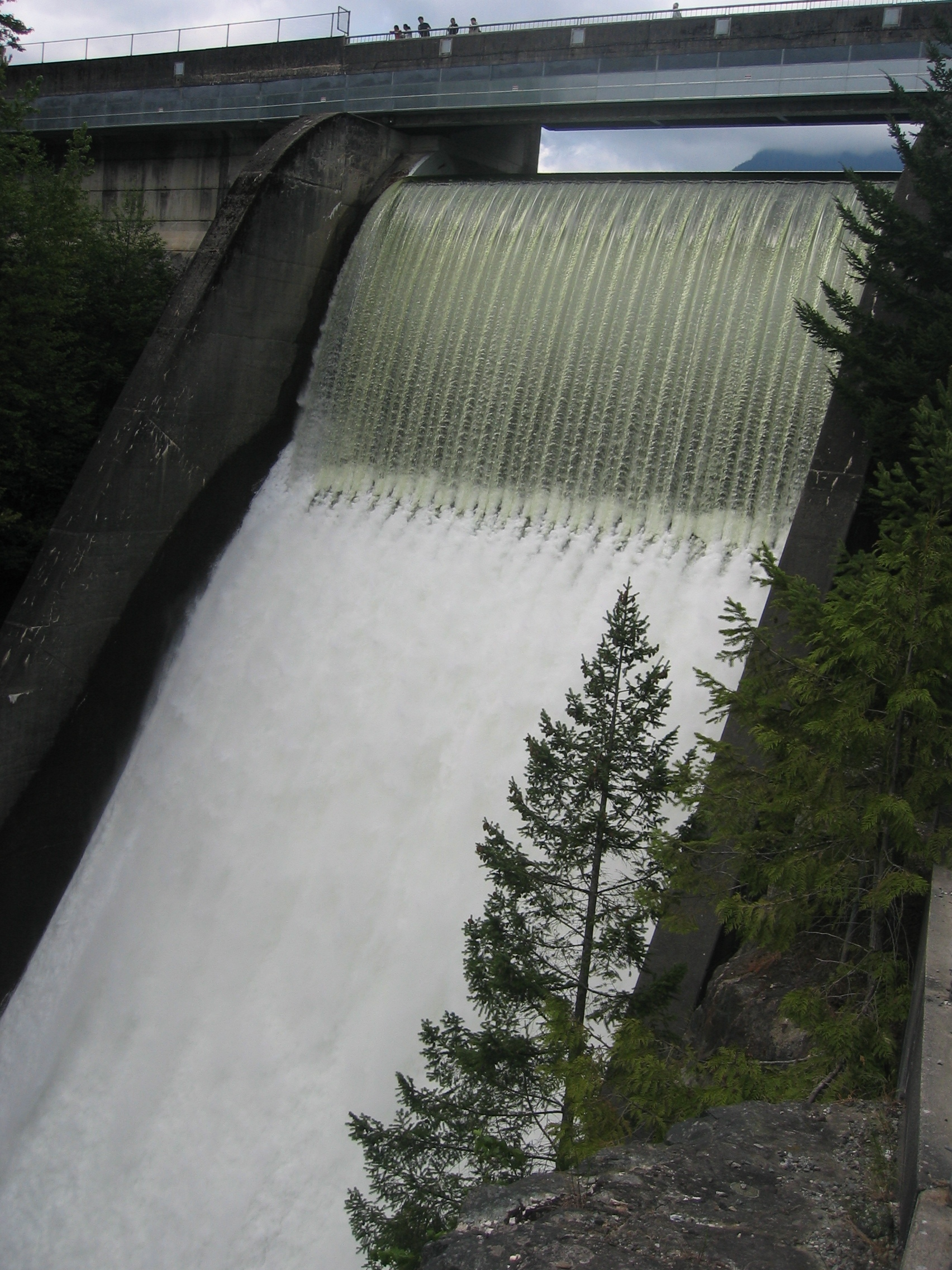
Cleveland Dam in North Vancouver District

Back woods The 100 (TV show)

=== Cleveland Dam ===
- The 6th Day
- Along Came a Spider
- The Commish (TV series)
- Dark Angel (2000 TV series)
- Eraser
- First Blood
- The Invisible
- The Man in the High Castle (TV series)
- Smallville (TV series)
- Supernatural (TV series)
- "The Vampire Diaries" (TV series)
- The 100

=== Cates Park ===
- Killer Instinct

=== Edgemont Village ===
- Double Jeopardy

=== Grouse Mountain ===
- American Pie Presents: Book of Love
- The X-Files (TV series)
- "Supernatural" (TV series)

=== Lions Gate Studios ===
- The 6th Day
- Elektra
- The Fog
- Josie and the Pussycats
- Psych (TV series)
- Reindeer Games
- Scary Movie 4
- Scooby-Doo 2: Monsters Unleashed
- Smallville (TV series)
- Willard

=== Lynn Canyon Park ===
- Once Upon a Time (TV series)
- Jumanji
- Lost in Space (2018 TV series)
- X-Men: The Last Stand
- Zoo (TV series)

=== Mount Seymour Provincial Park ===
- Atomic Train
- Little Women
- M.A.N.T.I.S.
- MacGyver (TV series)
- Highlander
- Pathfinder
- Stargate SG-1
- The X-Files (TV series)

=== Mount Seymour ===
- Hot Tub Time Machine
- Snow Buddies

=== Sutherland Secondary School ===
- Life Unexpected

=== Seycove Secondary School ===
- Bates Motel (TV series)
- Charlie St. Cloud
- Supernatural

=== Windsor Secondary School ===
- The X-Files (TV series)

== Pemberton ==
See Pemberton for details.

- The 13th Warrior
- Fantastic Four: Rise of the Silver Surfer
- The Grey Fox
- The Journey of Natty Gann
- Mile Zero
- Ski Hard aka Downhill Willie aka Ski Nuts
- The Twilight Saga: Breaking Dawn – Part 1 and The Twilight Saga: Breaking Dawn – Part 2
- Tyler Perry's Why Did I Get Married?
- The X-Files: I Want to Believe

Commercials:

- 2013 - Subaru film shoot
- 2012 - Procter & Gamble Olympic commercial
- 2011 - Kia car commercial
- 2004 - Mountain Dew commercial filmed at Pemberton Airport
- 2003 - Smart Set Clothing Co. fashion photo shoot at One Mile Lake
- 2003 - Hyundai car commercial filmed at Pemberton Airport
- 2002 - Chevy truck commercial filmed at One Mile Lake

== City of Pitt Meadows ==
- 3000 Miles To Graceland
- Blonde and Blonder
- Duets
- First Blood
- The Grey Fox

Swan-e-set Golf Course and Resort:

- Brotherhood IV
- Happy Gilmore

== Port Moody ==
=== Heritage Woods Secondary School ===
- Eureka
- John Tucker Must Die

== City of Richmond ==
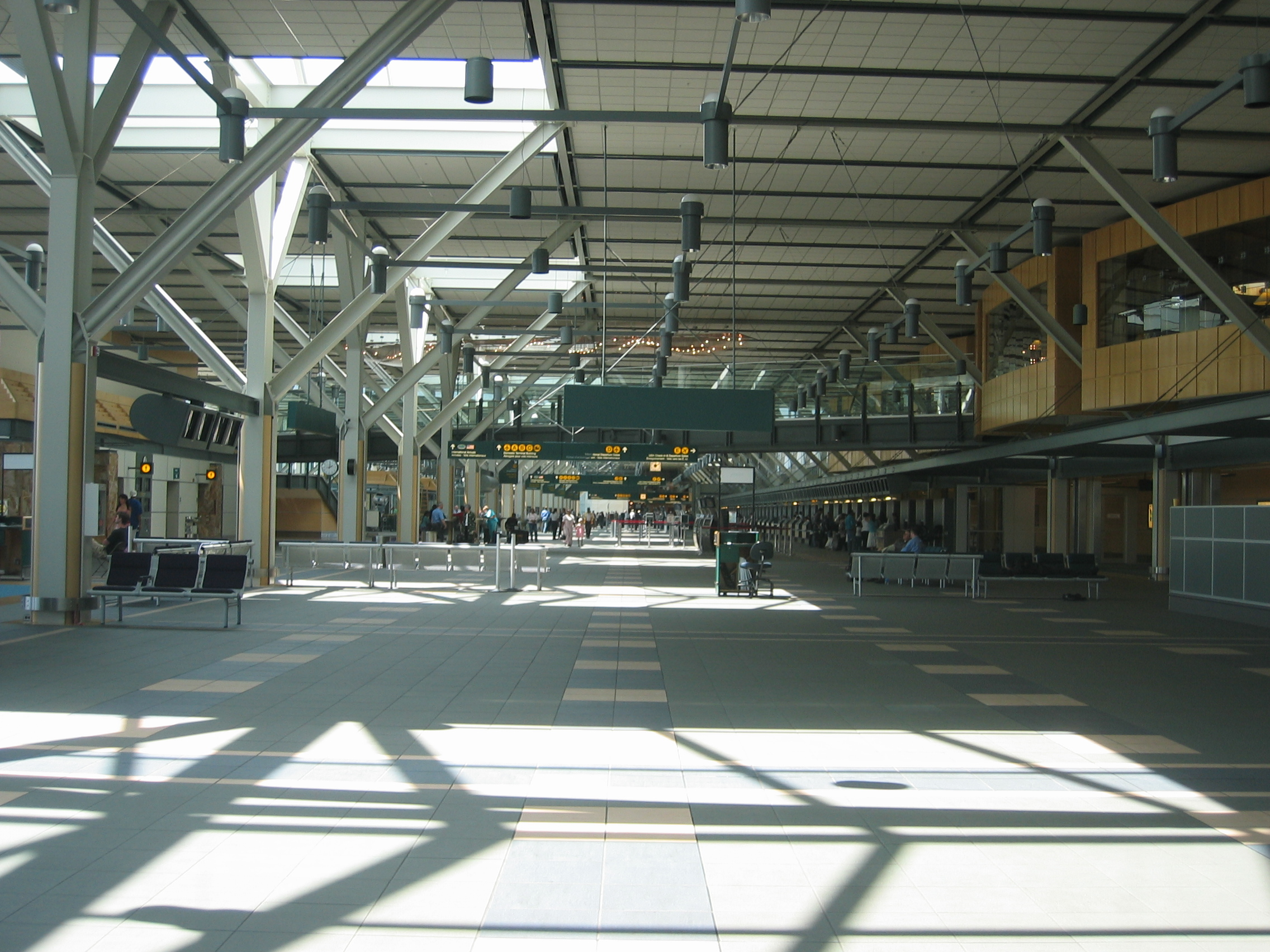
Vancouver International Airport in Richmond

=== Fantasy Gardens ===
- Cousins
- Halloweentown II: Kalabar's Revenge
- Highlander: The Series
- Killer Instinct
- Postal
- Stargate: Atlantis
- Stargate SG-1
- Supernatural

=== Gateway Theatre ===
- Psych (TV series)
- Smallville (TV series)

=== H.J. Cambie Secondary School ===
- Aliens in America
- Fringe (TV series)
- Life Unexpected

=== McMath Secondary School ===
- The 6th Day
- Supernatural

=== Minoru Park ===
- Smallville

=== Sand Dunes ===
- 10.5
- Battlestar Galactica
- RV
- Stargate SG-1

=== Richmond Centre ===
- Dead Like Me

=== RCMP Richmond Main Detachment Building ===
- The Drive of Life (Hong Kong TV drama)

=== Steveston ===
- The 4400 (TV series)
- Cats & Dogs 2
- Charlie St. Cloud
- Dreamcatcher
- Godzilla (2014)
- Highlander: The Series
- Killer Instinct
- Kingdom Hospital
- Knight Rider 2012
- Lost Boys 2
- Once Upon a Time
- Scary Movie
- The Secret Circle
- Stargate SG-1
- Supernatural
- Taken
- Three Moons Over Milford
- The Traveler
- The Twilight Saga: Eclipse
- The Uninvited
- The X-Files

=== YVR ===
- Aliens in America
- Are We There Yet?
- Border Security: Canada's Front Line (Canadian TV series)
- The Cleaner
- Fantastic Four: Rise of the Silver Surfer
- Final Destination
- Firewall
- Flight 93 (TV film)
- Good Luck Chuck
- The Killing
- The L Word
- The Lizzie McGuire Movie
- Passengers
- The Sisterhood of the Traveling Pants
- Snow Dogs
- Supernatural

=== Lansdowne Centre ===
- Josie and the Pussycats

== Squamish ==
TV series:

- Andromeda (2000–2005)
- Arctic Air (2014)
- Bates Motel (2015)
- Blade (2006)
- Continuum (2012)
- The Flash (2016)
- Great Canadian Books (2010)
- Green Arrow
- The Guard (2008)
- The Highlander
- MacGyver (1985)
- Men in Trees (2006)
- Midnight Sun (2014)
- Motive (2014)
- Restless Josie (2011)
- The Returned (2015)
- Rick Mercer Report
- Search and Rescue (2008)
- The Sentinel
- Supernatural (2016)
- Timeless (2016)
- The X-Files (1993)
- The Good Doctor (2017)

Commercials:

- Canadian Tire
- Delta Air Lines
- Ford
- Kellogg's
- Land Rover
- Ralph Lauren
- Snickers
- Tim Hortons
- Scotiabank

Feature films:

- The 12 Disasters of Christmas (2012 TV movie)
- 3000 Miles to Graceland (2001)
- A Fool and His Honey (2017)
- Are We There Yet? (2005)
- Backcountry (2014)
- Behemoth (2011 TV movie)
- Best. Trip. Ever. (2010 TV movie)
- Beyond Gravity (2000)
- Big Nothing (2006)
- The Big Year (2011)
- Bloodsuckers (2005 TV movie)
- Chaos Theory (2008)
- Coming Home for Christmas (2013 video)
- A Dangerous Man (2009 video)
- Dark Island (2010)
- Darkly Machiever (1997 short film)
- Deadly Pursuit (1988)
- Double Jeopardy (1999)
- Earth's Final Hours (2011 TV movie)
- Embrace of the Vampire (2013 video)
- End of the World (2013 TV movie)
- Far Cry (2008)
- Final Ascent (2000 TV movie)
- Final Destination (2000)
- Firestorm (1998)
- The Fourth Kind (2009)
- Free Willy 3: The Rescue (1997)
- Goodbye (2012 short film)
- Happy Face Killer (2014 TV movie)
- The Haze (2012 short film)
- Hike (2010 short film)
- Horns (2013)
- Ice Road Terror (2011 TV movie)
- In the Shadow of the Chief (2003 documentary)
- Insomnia (2002)
- The Interview (2015)
- Into the Forest
- Kevin of the North (2001)
- Kraken: Tentacles of the Deep (2006 TV movie)
- Life Is Calling My Name (2008 documentary)
- Little Black Caddy (2005 short film)
- Lone Hero (2002)
- Lunch with Charles (2001)
- Marijuana PSA (2015 short film)
- The Marine 4: Moving Target (2015 video)
- McCabe & Mrs. Miller (1971)
- MVP: Most Valuable Primate (2000)
- No Clue (2013)
- Pathfinder (2007)
- Peacemakers (1997)
- The Revenant (2015)
- Revisiting "Suddenly" (2013 documentary)
- The Rise of Enduro (2014 documentary)
- Say It Isn't So (2001)
- Star Trek Beyond (2016)
- Suddenly (2013)
- Thrown (2002 short film)
- The Tree That Saved Christmas (2014 TV movie)
- The Twilight Saga: Breaking Dawn - Part 1 (2011)
- Walking Tall (2004)
- Way of the Wicked (2014)
- What It Takes: A Documentary About 4 World Class Triathletes' Quest for Greatness (2006 documentary)
- White Fang 2: Myth of the White Wolf (1994)
- Wild Guys (2004)
- The Woods (2013)
- Zolar (2004 TV movie)

== City of Surrey ==
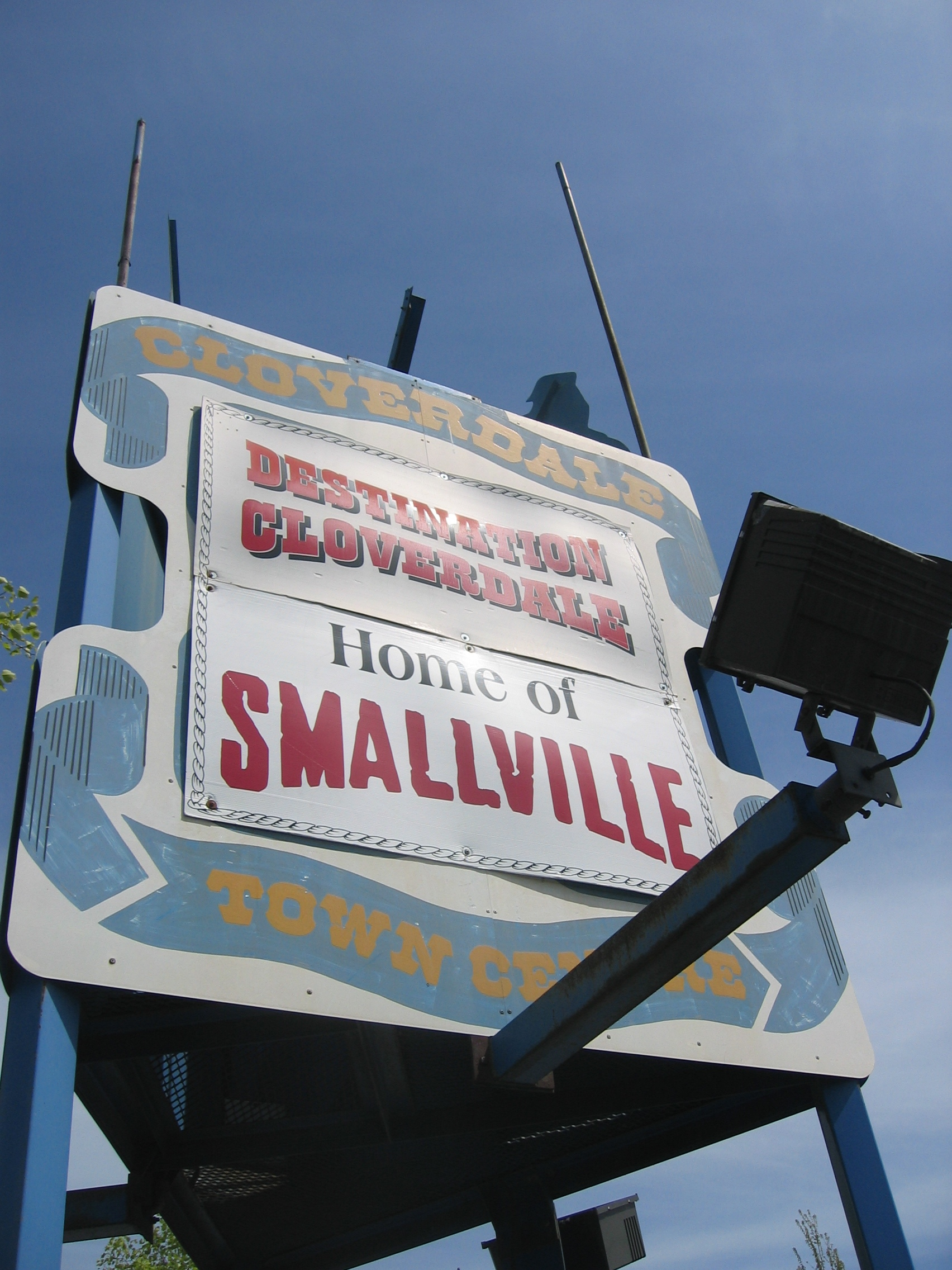
Cloverdale's welcome sign: "Home of Smallville!"

=== Cloverdale ===
- The 4400 (TV series)
- Bionic Woman (TV series)
- Deck The Halls
- Fire With Fire
- Hot Rod
- Postal
- Smallville (TV series)

=== Central City Shopping Centre ===
- Catwoman
- Fantastic Four
- I, Robot
- Painkiller Jane
- Smallville (TV series)

=== Guildford Town Centre ===
- The Evidence (TV series)

=== Clayton Heights Secondary School ===
- Saved!
- The Mighty Ducks: Game Changers (TV series)

=== North Surrey Secondary School ===
- Agent Cody Banks
- Jennifer's Body

=== SFU Surrey Campus ===
- Chaos

=== Softball City ===
- Juno

=== South Surrey ===
- Deck the Halls
- Human Target (TV series)
- The Twilight Saga: Breaking Dawn

=== Sullivan Heights Secondary School ===
- Another Cinderella Story

== City of Vancouver ==
=== Unknown / various ===
- The Andromeda Strain (2008 film)
- Bird on a Wire (1990 film)
- The Death of the Incredible Hulk (1990 TV film)
- Mystery Date
- The Trial of the Incredible Hulk (1989 TV film)

=== 2404 Guelph Street ===
- Dirk Gently's Holistic Detective Agency (TV series) (Season 1)

=== 2400 Motel on Kingsway ===
- 3000 Miles to Graceland
- Backrooms
- Beyond Belief: Fact or Fiction
- Smallville (TV series)
- Supernatural (TV series)
- The X-Files (TV series)
- Yellowjackets (TV series)

=== BC Place Stadium ===
- The 6th Day
- Butterfly on a Wheel
- Caprica (TV series)
- Fantastic Four
- Highlander: The Series
- MacGyver (TV series)
- Paycheck
- Sea Beast (aka Troglodyte)
- Smallville (TV series)
- The Flash (TV series)
- The Troop (TV series)
- Two For The Money

=== Burrard Station ===
- The Dead Zone (TV series)
- Edison Force
- Paycheck
- The Trial of the Incredible Hulk
- V (TV series)

=== Burrard Street Bridge ===
- Highlander: The Series
- Fantastic Four
- Free Willy 3: The Rescue

=== Canada Post: Downtown office ===
- Ecks vs. Sever
- Smallville (TV series)

=== Chinatown, Vancouver ===
- 10.5
- Caprica
- Highlander: The Series
- Cousins
- Falling Skies
- Fringe (TV series)
- Killer Instinct
- The Killing (TV series)
- Rumble in the Bronx
- Supernatural (TV series)
- They Wait
- Unforgettable
- The X-Files (TV series)
- X-Men: The Last Stand
- Always Be My Maybe (2019 film)

=== Georgia Viaduct, Vancouver ===
- Deadpool

=== David Thompson Secondary School ===
- 21 Jump Street
- Eclipse
- New Moon
- Psych (TV series)

=== Eric Hamber Secondary School ===
- 21 Jump Street (TV series)
- Juno
- Riverdale (TV series)

=== Gladstone Secondary School ===
- 21 Jump Street
- Supernatural (TV series)

=== Gastown ===
- 21 Jump Street (TV series)
- Big Eyes
- Booker (TV series)
- Caprica (TV series)
- Catwoman
- Elegy
- The Final Cut
- Fringe (TV series)
- Good Luck Chuck
- Hellcats
- Highlander: The Series
- I, Robot
- The Imaginarium of Doctor Parnassus
- The Killing (TV series)
- Kingdom Hospital
- Legends of the Fall
- Man of the House (1995 film)
- Messages Deleted
- Murphy's Law (TV series)
- The NeverEnding Story
- Romeo Must Die
- Sliders
- Stingray (TV series)
- Supernatural (TV series)
- They Wait
- Top of the Hill (TV series)
- Unsub (TV series)
- Wiseguy (TV series)

=== Government of Canada Building ===
- Good Luck Chuck
- Smallville

=== Granville Island ===
- Good Luck Chuck
- Mission: Impossible – Ghost Protocol
- Saving Silverman
- The Suite Life Movie
- Midnight Sun

=== Henry Hudson Elementary School ===
- Daddy Day Care
- Dark Water

=== John Oliver Secondary ===
- 21 Jump Street
- What Goes Up
- Riverdale (2017 TV series)
- There's Someone Inside Your House

=== Kerrisdale ===
- Air Bud
- Diary of a Wimpy Kid: Rodrick Rules
- Josie and the Pussycats
- Little Man
- Jinxed (house collapse scene)
- Once Upon a Time

=== Kitsilano ===
- Life-Size
- Personal Effects
- Things We Lost in the Fire

Kitsilano Secondary School:

- 21 Jump Street
- Good Luck Chuck
- John Tucker Must Die
- Riverdale (2017 TV series)
- Santa Clause 2
- That Cold Day in the Park
- Tron: Legacy
- Two for the Money

=== Lions Gate Bridge ===
- The 6th Day
- Are We There Yet?
- Final Destination 5
- Tron: Legacy

=== Lord Byng Secondary School ===
- 21 Jump Street
- The Boy Who Could Fly
- Hollow Man 2
- The Layover
- Masters of Horror
- Pretty Little Liars (TV series)
- Riverdale (2017 TV series)
- Swindle
- The X-Files
- X-Men Origins: Wolverine

=== Lord Strathcona Elementary School ===
- The Perfect Score
- Chilling Adventures of Sabrina

=== Magee Secondary School ===
- I Love You, Beth Cooper
- John Tucker Must Die

=== Mary's on Davie West End, Vancouver ===
- Main Event (Netflix Movie)
- Career Opportunities in Murder and Mayhem (TV Series)

=== Marine Building ===
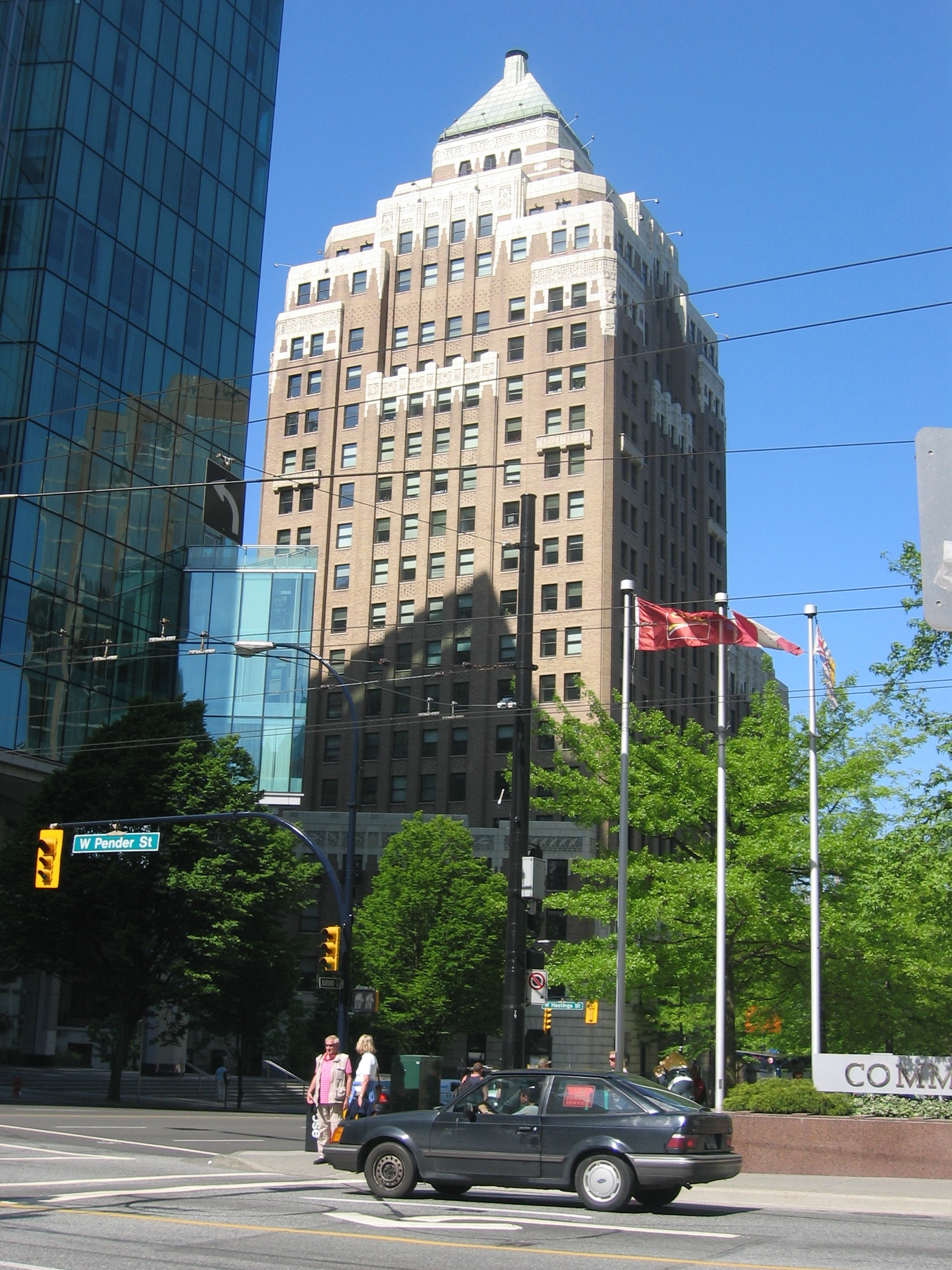
The Marine Building, better known as the Daily Planet offices in Smallville

- Battle in Seattle
- Blade: Trinity
- Fantastic Four
- Life or Something Like It
- Smallville
- Timecop

=== Mountain View Cemetery ===
- Fringe (TV series)
- Highlander: The Series
- The Killing (TV series)
- Martian Child

=== Molson Canadian Brewery ===
- Battlestar Galactica (TV series)

=== Nat Bailey Stadium ===
- Highlander: The Series
- Malicious
- Martian Child

=== Oakridge Centre ===
- 21 Jump Street
- Dead Like Me

=== One Wall Centre ===
- The Core
- X-Men: The Last Stand

=== The Orpheum Theatre ===
- Battlestar Galactica (TV series)
- Caprica (TV series)
- Fringe (TV series)
- Hellcats
- Highlander: The Series (TV series)
- The Imaginarium of Doctor Parnassus
- The L Word (TV series)
- Psych (TV series)
- Sliders (TV series)
- The Twilight Saga: Breaking Dawn - Part 1
- The X-Files (TV series)

=== Pacific National Exhibition ===
- 3000 Miles To Graceland
- Are We There Yet?
- Best in Show
- Cats & Dogs
- Fear
- Final Destination 3
- Happy Gilmore
- Kyle XY
- The L Word
- A Man, a Woman and a Bank
- Miracle
- Percy Jackson: Sea of Monsters
- Riding the Bullet
- Rocky IV

=== Plaza of Nations ===
- Fantastic 4
- Final Destination 2
- Highlander: The Series
- The Outer Limits
- Stargate SG-1
- X-Men 2
- Zenon: Girl of the 21st Century

=== Point Grey Secondary School ===
- 21 Jump Street
- Life as We Know It (TV series)
- Riverdale (2017 TV series)
- She's the Man
- Principal Takes a Holiday
- To All the Boys I've Loved Before
- To All the Boys: P.S. I Still Love You

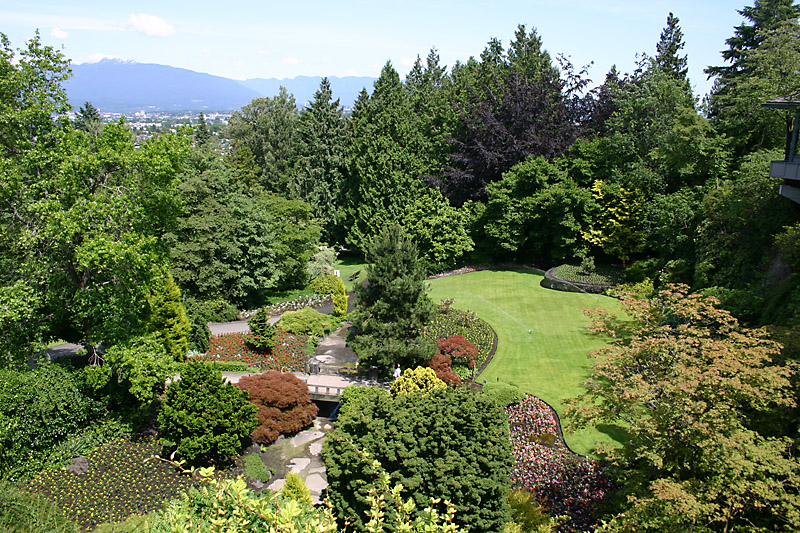
Queen Elizabeth Park

=== Queen Elizabeth Park ===
- Andromeda
- The Boy Who Could Fly
- Stargate SG-1

=== Ridge Theatre interior and Ridge Bowling Alley interior (now demolished) ===
- Out of the Blue
- New Moon
- Supernatural

=== Robson Square ===
- The 4400 (TV series)
- Chaos Theory
- Fringe (TV series)
- Highlander: The Series
- Runaway (1984 film)
- Shoot to Kill
- Smallville (TV series)
- Stargate SG-1 (TV series)
- The X-Files (TV series)
- X-Men: The Last Stand

=== Rogers Arena (formerly General Motors Place) ===
- The 6th Day
- The 6th Man
- Air Bud
- Josie and The Pussycats
- The L Word
- MVP 2: Most Vertical Primate
- The X-Files

=== Royal Bank of Canada Downtown ===
- Supernatural

Death of the Incredible Hulk

=== Shaughnessy Elementary School ===
- Air Bud
- Diary of a Wimpy Kid
- The Perfect Score

=== St. Andrew's-Wesley United Church ===
- Dark Angel
- Supernatural

=== St. George's School ===
- 21 Jump Street
- MacGyver
- Neon Rider
- Smallville
- The X-Files
- Midnight Sun

=== St. Patrick's Regional Secondary School ===
- I Love You, Beth Cooper

=== Simon Fraser University Downtown Campus ===
- Fantastic Four: Rise of the Silver Surfer

=== Stanley Park ===
- 50/50
- The 6th Day
- Cousins
- Fringe (TV series)
- Highlander: The Series (TV series)
- It (1990 TV miniseries)
- MacGyver (TV series)
- Mr. Magoo
- Psych (TV series)
- Stargate SG-1
- That Cold Day in the Park
- The X-Files (TV series)

=== Templeton Secondary School ===
- Aliens in America
- Bionic Woman (TV series)
- The Boy Who Cried Werewolf
- Diary of a Wimpy Kid
- Diary of a Wimpy Kid: Rodrick Rules
- Gym Teacher: The Movie
- Kyle XY
- Personal Effects
- Safety Glass
- Scooby-Doo! The Mystery Begins
- The Secret Circle
- Smallville (TV series)
- Spectacular!
- Supernatural
- The Vampire Diaries (pilot)
- What Goes Up

=== Vancouver Aquarium in Stanley Park ===
- Ballistic: Ecks vs. Sever
- Good Luck Chuck
- Josie and The Pussycats
- Psych (TV series)
- Smallville (TV series)
- The Suite Life Movie
- Taken (TV series)
- The X-Files (TV series)
- The Flash (TV series)
- The 100 (TV series)
- Prison Break (TV series)
- Imposters (TV series)
- A Million Little Things (TV series)
- To All the Boys I've Loved Before 2 (Netflix Original)
- Twilight Zone (TV series)

=== Vancouver Art Gallery ===
- The 4400 (TV series)
- The Accused
- Arrow (TV series)
- Battle in Seattle
- Caprica
- The Core
- The Deal
- Elegy
- Fringe (TV series)
- The Killing
- Life Unexpected
- Night at the Museum
- Scooby-Doo 2: Monsters Unleashed
- Sliders (TV series)
- Smallville (TV series)
- Stargate SG-1 (TV series)
- This Means War
- The X-Files (TV series)
- X-Men: The Last Stand

=== Vancouver College ===
- 21 Jump Street
- Final Destination 3
- She's the Man
- Smallville (TV series)
- Wonder
- The X-Files (TV series)

=== Vancouver Film Studios ===
- Battlestar Galactica
- The Chronicles of Riddick
- In the Name of the King: A Dungeon Siege Tale

=== Vancouver Public Library ===
- The 6th Day
- 88 Minutes
- Ballistic: Ecks vs. Sever
- Battle in Seattle
- Battlestar Galactica (TV series)
- Caprica (TV series)
- The Dead Zone (TV series)
- Double Jeopardy
- Fringe (TV series)
- The Imaginarium of Doctor Parnassus
- iZombie (TV series)
- The Killing (TV series)
- Mr. Magoo
- Smallville (TV series)
- Stargate SG-1
- This Means War
- Tru Calling

=== Vancouver Technical Secondary School ===
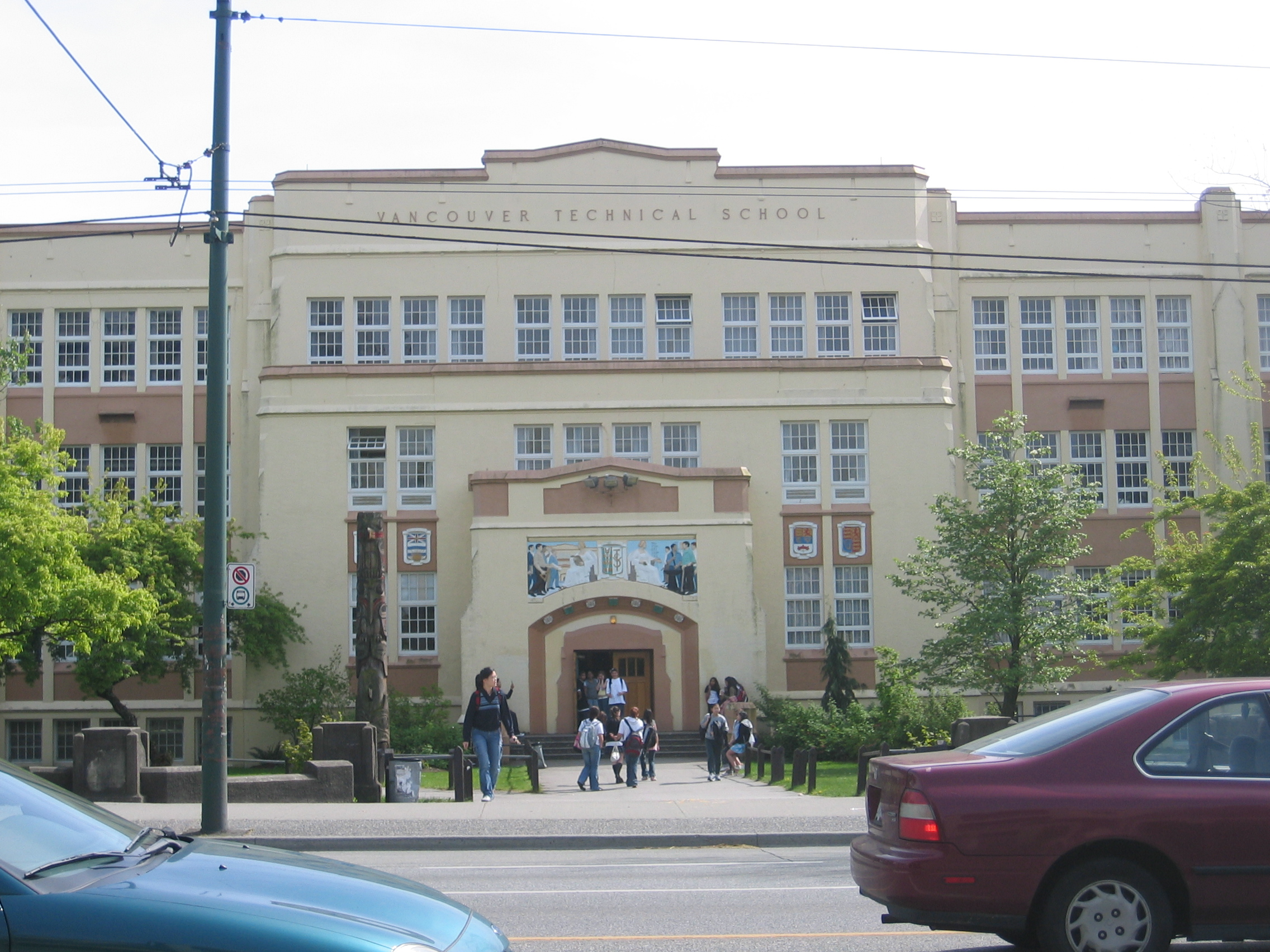
Vancouver Technical Secondary School

- 21 Jump Street (TV series)
- Diary of a Wimpy Kid
- Ernest Goes to School
- Elysium
- The Killing
- Marmaduke
- Paycheck
- Psych (TV series)
- Scary Movie
- She's The Man
- Smallville (TV series)
- Spectacular!
- Supernatural (TV series)
- iZombie (TV series)

=== Vanier Park ===
- The 4400 (TV series)
- MacGyver (TV series)
- Romeo Must Die

=== Viking Hall ===
- Out Of The Blue

=== Waterfront Station ===
- Fringe (TV series)
- Life Unexpected

=== West Point Grey ===
- Life-Size

=== Windermere Secondary School ===
- 21 Jump Street (TV series)
- Bionic Woman

=== Yaletown ===
- 88 Minutes
- Good Luck Chuck
- Rumble in the Bronx
- Stargate SG-1 (TV series)

== UBC Vancouver and the University Endowment Lands ==
=== University of British Columbia (UBC) ===
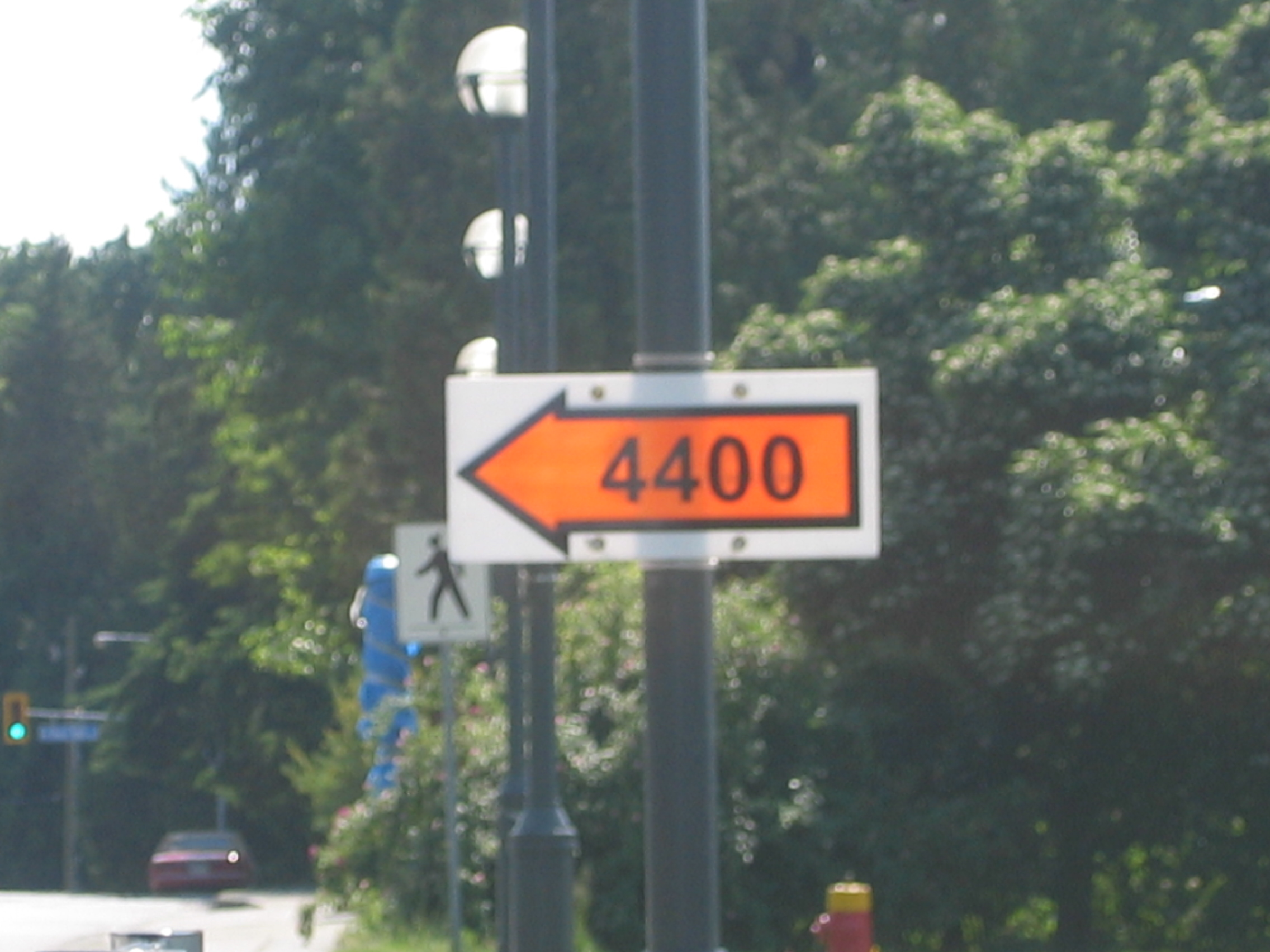
Filming signs for The 4400, near the Rose Garden Parkade at UBC

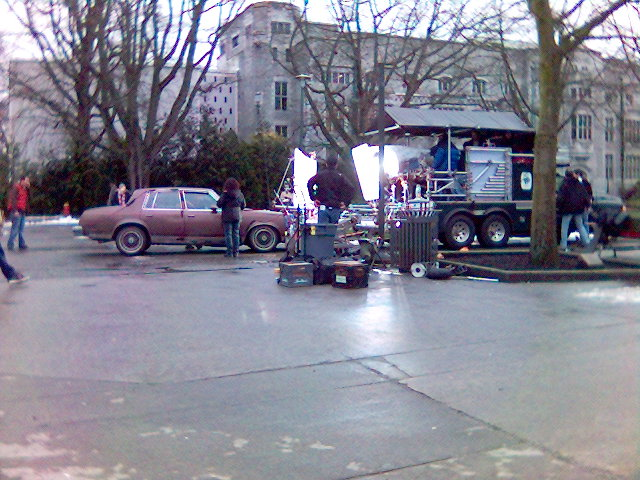
Wind Chill filming on the UBC campus on Main Mall at Agricultural Road

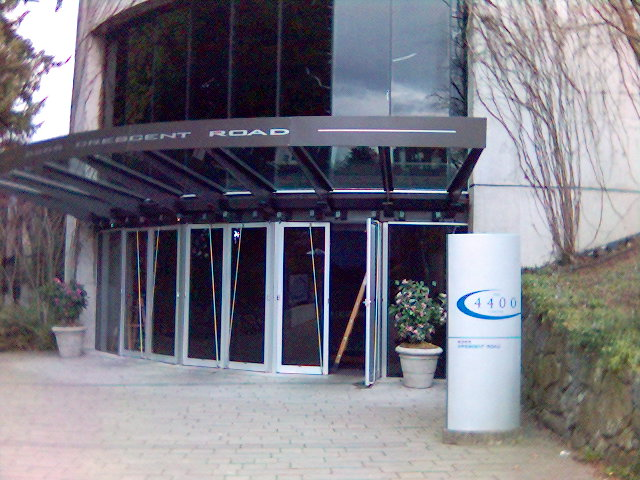
The Chan Centre at UBC standing in for The 4400 Center, during filming for The 4400

- Buchanan Building block and Buchanan Tower:
  - The Man in the High Castle (TV series)
  - The 4400 (TV series)
  - The Exorcism of Emily Rose
  - Fringe (TV series)
  - Supernatural
  - X-Men Origins: Wolverine
- Chan Centre for the Performing Arts:
  - The 4400 (TV series)
  - All I Want
  - Almost Human (TV series)
  - Antitrust
  - Backstrom (TV series)
  - Battlestar Galactica (TV series)
  - Bionic Woman
  - Continuum (TV series)
  - The Dead Zone (TV series)
  - Eureka (TV series)
  - Fantastic Four: Rise of the Silver Surfer
  - Fringe (TV series)
  - Josie and the Pussycats
  - The King of Fighters
  - Kyle XY
  - Off Campus (TV series)
  - Psych (TV series)
  - Reaper (TV series)
  - Stargate Atlantis
  - Try Seventeen
- Chemistry Building:
  - Fringe (TV series)
  - Kingdom Hospital
  - Supernatural
- Forest Sciences Centre:
  - The 4400 (TV series)
- General Services Administration Building:
  - Taken
- Geography Building:
  - The Butterfly Effect
  - Life Unexpected
- Green College:
  - Good Luck Chuck
  - Harper's Island
- Irving K. Barber Learning Centre:
  - 50 Shades of Grey
  - Emily Owens M.D.
  - Fringe (TV series)
  - The X-Files (TV series)
- Faculty of Pharmaceutical Sciences Building
  - The Flash (2014 TV series)
- Kenny Building:
  - The Exorcism of Emily Rose
- Koerner Library and Square:
  - 88 Minutes
  - Battlestar Galactica (TV series)
  - The Butterfly Effect
  - Hellcats (TV series)
  - The L Word (TV series)
  - Psych (TV series)
  - Ratko: The Dictator's Son
  - Smallville (TV series)
  - Wind Chill
- Liu Institute for Global Issues – Case study room:
  - Smokin' Aces 2: Assassins' Ball
- MacMillan Building:
  - The Exorcism of Emily Rose
- Morris and Helen Belkin Art Gallery:
  - Antitrust
  - Killer Instinct (TV series)
- Museum of Anthropology at UBC:
  - Intersection
  - Masterminds
  - Psych (TV series)
  - Smallville (TV series)
- Music Building:
  - Life Unexpected
- Old Bus Loop:
  - The 4400 (TV series)
- Rose Garden:
  - The 4400 (TV series)
  - Battlestar Galactica (TV series)
  - Fringe (TV series)
- Thunderbird Stadium:
  - Psych (TV series)
  - She's the Man
- TRIUMF:
  - Pathfinder
- War Memorial Gym:
  - Taken
- Hennings Building:
  - Lucky Hank (TV series)

=== University Hill Secondary School ===
- Ernest Goes to School
- Hellcats (TV series)
- Jennifer's Body

=== University Marketplace ===
- The 4400 (TV series)

=== Thunderbird Stadium ===
- She's the Man
- Final Destination 3

== District of West Vancouver ==
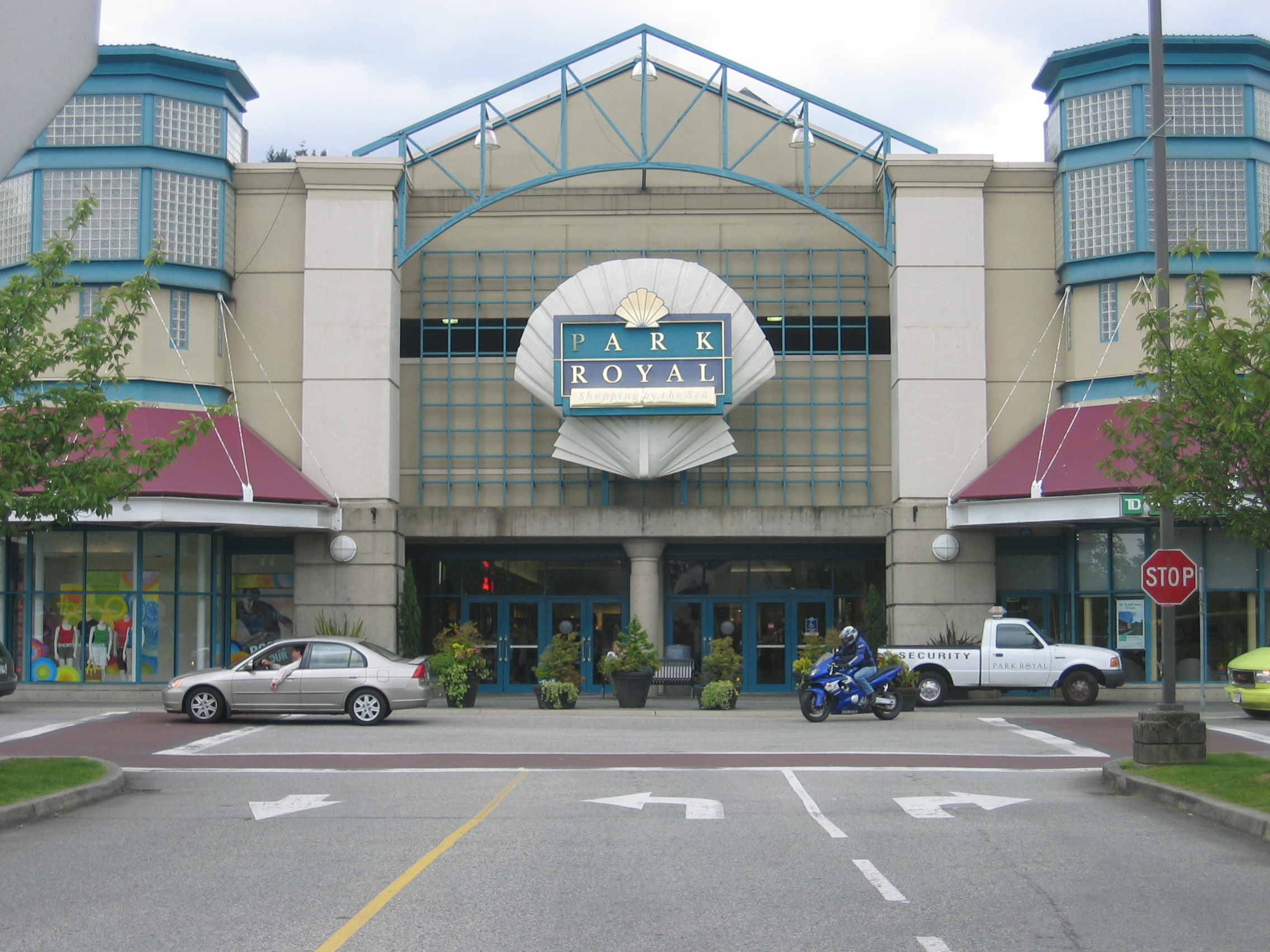
Park Royal Shopping Centre

=== Panorama Studios ===
- That Cold Day in the Park (1969)
- Carnal Knowledge (1971)
- McCabe & Mrs. Miller (1971) (only used PBS Studios projection room to run dailies)
- Let's Make a Deal (1980–1981 version)
- Tom Jones (TV series) (1980–1981)
- Pitfall (game show) (1981–1982)

=== Park Royal Shopping Centre ===
- Life-Size

=== Collingwood School ===
- The Last Mimzy

== Whistler ==
- MTV's Peak Season
- Ski School (1990)
- Ski School (1994)
- The X-Files: I Want to Believe

== City of White Rock ==
- Behind The Camera: The Unauthorized Story of Diff'rent Strokes
- Big Meat Eater
- The Day The Earth Stood Still
- Deck The Halls
- Driven to Kill
- Juno
- Knock-Out
- Psych (TV series)
- The Railrodder
- Sisterhood of the Traveling Pants
- The X-Files (TV series)
- Likey (Twice music video)

== See also ==
- Metro Vancouver
- Hollywood North
- List of filming locations in the BC Interior
- Cinema of Canada
- Montreal in films
- List of films shot in Toronto
