= Blair Entertainment =

Television syndication company

- Formerly: Rhodes Productions (1970–1983); Blair Video Enterprises (1982–1983)
- Company type: Subsidiary
- Industry: Television syndication
- Founded: 1970; 56 years ago (original); May 1975; 51 years ago (relaunch)
- Founder: Jack E. Rhodes
- Defunct: 1992; 34 years ago
- Fate: Renamed to Taft H-B Program Sales (original); Acquired by All American Communications (relaunch)
- Successor: Taft H-B Program Sales (original); All American Communications Television (relaunch)
- Headquarters: New York City, New York, United States
- Parent: Taft Broadcasting (1970–1975); Filmways (1975–1978); Blair Television (1982–1992)

Blair Entertainment (formerly Rhodes Productions) was a television production/distribution company founded by Jack E. Rhodes, operated from 1975 until 1992.

== History ==
=== Rhodes Productions ===
Rhodes Productions was originally formed in 1970 by Jack E. Rhodes as a subsidiary of Taft Broadcasting Company in New York City, to distribute Hanna-Barbera cartoons. In 1971, Rhodes expanded by distributing the syndicated version of the game show Hollywood Squares. Also at the same time, the company's headquarters was moved from New York City to Los Angeles. In 1972, the company had hired Jack Pearson International as the company's international supplier of its products.

In 1975, the original Rhodes Productions was renamed by Taft to Taft H-B Program Sales, and Jack E. Rhodes moved to Filmways to relaunch Rhodes Productions as Filmways' domestic distribution arm. Rhodes took the nighttime Hollywood Squares with them, and also launched the nighttime version of the game show High Rollers. Under the Filmways regime, Rhodes Productions also launched a soap opera spoof for late night timeslots, Mary Hartman, Mary Hartman, produced by Norman Lear and his T.A.T. Communications Company beginning in 1976. In 1977, Rhodes Productions debuted its breakout property Second City Television (SCTV), which originated in Canada.

In 1978, Rhodes Productions split off from Filmways (which formed Filmways Enterprises to fill the void left by Rhodes), and began operating as an independent production company and syndicator. Rhodes opted to keep the distribution rights to Second City Television and Disco Break. In 1980, Rhodes purchased the syndication rights to a short-lived, Canadian-originated revival of Let's Make a Deal. This was followed up in 1981 with another Canadian game show, Pitfall. Both Pitfall and the 1980 Let's Make a Deal were produced by Catalena Productions, which would fold amid financial and legal problems in 1981.

=== Blair Entertainment ===
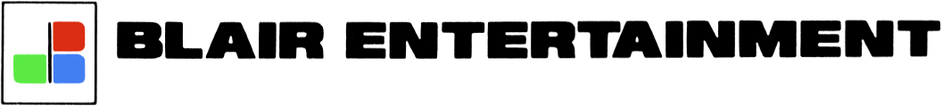
Logo used from 1983 to 1988

In February 1981, John Blair & Company, through Blair Television, founded Blair Video Enterprises with Richard C. Coveny as president. This unit entered the syndication market in 1982 with the first-run music magazine format series The Rock 'n' Roll Show. In late August 1983, Blair acquired Rhodes Productions, with Jack E. Rhodes brought on as special sales consultant. In October 1983, the company was officially renamed Blair Entertainment. Blair retained distribution rights to several shows, including The Cisco Kid and SCTV, as well as a revival of Divorce Court. In 1985, Blair Entertainment introduced the new game show Break the Bank in partnership with broadcasting groups Storer Communications and Hubbard Broadcasting. This was followed in 1986 by another game show property, Strike It Rich. Kline and Friends, the producers of both shows, also piloted a third series titled Sweethearts for Blair; this show never made it to air.

Divorce Court was highly profitable, among other hit syndicated series in Blair's lineup. In 1990, Blair Entertainment, in collaboration with RHI Entertainment (now known as Halcyon Studios) and advertising sales agent Action Media Group launched a new drama, Dracula, as their entry into the syndicated action/adventure market; it only lasted one season. In 1991, Blair Entertainment debuted a new program in collaboration with GRB Entertainment and All American Television, Stuntmasters, which would ultimately be their final new series.

In 1992, Blair Entertainment shuttered their operations (which had generally been a sideline to Blair Television's primary market of representing television stations for advertising sales), in part because of the company being unable to find additional investors into their operation, and their program library was acquired shortly thereafter by All American. Currently, majority of its library has since been passed to Fremantle. Rights to the Divorce Court franchise (through Storer) was maintained by New World Entertainment and thereafter by Twentieth Television's distribution unit. The series has been currently syndicated by Fox First Run since 2019.

== List of syndicated programs ==
This is a list of television programs that were syndicated by Blair Entertainment:

- The Beachcombers (1972)
- Break the Bank (1985)
- The Cisco Kid (1950)
- Death Valley Days (1952)
- Divorce Court (1984)
- Dracula: The Series (1990)
- Let's Make a Deal (1980)
- Lollipop Dragon (1986)
- Pitfall (1981)
- The Rovers (1969)
- SCTV (1976)
- Strike It Rich (1986)
- Stuntmasters (1991-1992, co-production with GRB Entertainment)

== See also ==
- Fremantle
- All American Television
- Lexington Broadcast Services Company
