= Tom Jones: The Right Time =

- Genre: Music
- Directed by: Declan Lowney
- Presented by: Tom Jones
- Country of origin: United Kingdom
- Original language: English
- No. of episodes: 6

Production
- Executive producer: Richard Holloway
- Producer: Graham K. Smith
- Production location: ITV Studios, Southbank
- Running time: 30 minutes
- Production company: Central Independent Television

Original release
- Network: ITV; VH1
- Release: 6 June – 11 July 1992

Related
- Tom Jones (TV program)

Tom Jones: The Right Time is a six-episode television series hosted by Tom Jones. The 30-minute episodes were first broadcast on ITV in the United Kingdom in 1992 and featured music and interviews in front of a live audience. The show was also broadcast in the United States on VH1 in 1992–93. John Marchese of the New York Times News Service described it as a "whirlwind briefing on the history of pop music". Guest stars included Bob Geldof, Cyndi Lauper, The Chieftains and Stevie Wonder.

== Themes ==
Across the six episodes, Jones traces the evolution of pop music, and how it has been influenced by gospel, soul, country and rhythm and blues music. The final episode of the series, a special with Stevie Wonder, was nominated for a CableACE Award for best International Music Special or Series having been broadcast on VH1. In addition to guest artists performing, Jones also performed alongside many of them. He described singing lead vocals on EMF's "Unbelievable" as "his favourite episode".

== Episode list ==
No.	Theme	Guest stars	Original release date
1	"Pop music"	Erasure • EMF • Shakespear's Sister	6 June 1992
2	"Gospel music"	Al Jarreau • Mica Paris • David Gilmour	13 June 1992
3	"Soul music"	Cyndi Lauper • Sam Moore • Daryl Hall	20 June 1992
4	"Country and Celtic music"	Bob Geldof • Lyle Lovett • The Chieftains	27 June 1992
5	"Rhythm and blues music"	Joe Cocker • Curtis Stigers	3 July 1992
6	"Special episode with Stevie Wonder"	Stevie Wonder	11 July 1992
