= Pitfall (game show) =

1981–1982 Canadian game show

- Genre: Game show
- Directed by: Geoff Theobald
- Presented by: Alex Trebek
- Announcer: John Barton
- Country of origin: Canada

Production
- Executive producer: Bill Armstrong
- Producers: Ian MacLennan; John Barton
- Production locations: Panorama Film Studios; West Vancouver, British Columbia
- Running time: approx. 22-26 minutes
- Production companies: Catalena Productions; Rhodes Productions

Original release
- Network: Syndication
- Release: September 14, 1981 – September 1982

Pitfall is a Canadian game show that aired in American and Canadian syndication from September 14, 1981, to September 1982. The host was Alex Trebek and the announcer was John Barton (who also served as co-producer). The show featured contestants attempting to predict the outcome of survey questions conducted to the studio audience, and the bonus round required them to cross an elevated bridge by answering trivia questions.

The show was filmed at Panorama Film Studios in West Vancouver, British Columbia and produced by Catalena Productions, with distribution provided by Rhodes Productions. Due to Catalena going bankrupt in 1981, production of the show ended; as a result, many contestants and staff were never paid.

== Game play ==
=== Main game ===
Two contestants attempted to predict how the studio audience answered questions about lifestyle and personal preference. For each question, the contestants and audience were shown four possible answers. Using a keypad, each audience member chose one of the responses, after which Trebek asked each contestant to choose the answer they thought had received the highest percentage of votes. Contestants could not choose the same answer. The champion chose first on the opening question, and control alternated between the contestants on every subsequent one.

One point was scored for choosing the most popular answer to a question. Contestants could also earn "Pit Passes," which would come into play in the Pitfall round. One pass was awarded for a contestant's first, third, and fifth points, for a maximum of three per game.

Play continued for a maximum of five minutes. The first contestant to reach five points, or the one who was in the lead when time ran out, won the game and advanced to the bonus round, known as the Pitfall round.

=== Pitfall round ===
The champion attempted to cross a bridge composed of eight numbered sections in under 100 seconds by answering general knowledge trivia questions. Three of the eight sections contained pitfalls, and stepping on one caused the champion to descend via elevator to the floor below the bridge. Before the round began, the champion watched a sequence of flashing lights on the bridge sections in random order; safe sections lit up once, while pitfalls lit up twice. He or she then selected the appropriate number of Pit Passes from a rack of eight numbered cards.

Trebek and the champion rode an elevator up to the left end of the bridge, and the clock began to count down as soon as Trebek started to read the first question. The champion could advance from one section to the next only by correctly answering a question; if he or she answered incorrectly or passed, Trebek gave the answer and read a new one. Handing Trebek a Pit Pass enabled the champion to bypass a section entirely, whether or not it was a pitfall, but the champion had to give the corresponding pass to Trebek before stepping into the section for it to count.

If the champion stepped onto a pitfall without either having the proper pass or giving it to Trebek in time, an elevator lowered the contestant down to the stage floor (taking approximately 10 seconds) as the clock continued to run. Trebek waited to continue asking questions until the champion was at floor level. Giving a correct answer would cause the elevator to ascend again, with the clock temporarily stopped during the ascent, and he/she would have to answer another question in order to advance.

The contestant received $100 for each section reached or bypassed within the time limit, and a prize package totaling approximately $5,000 for reaching the right end of the bridge. Later, a prize was awarded for reaching the fifth section and a prize package of approximately $2,500 was awarded for crossing the bridge.

== Cancellation ==
Catalena Productions, which also produced the 1980–81 syndicated revival of Let's Make a Deal, went bankrupt on August 31, 1981, after the company was sued for not paying Monty Hall or Stefan Hatos, the producers of that series. The bankruptcy became effective before the series even aired; this resulted in stations slated to air the program having difficulty acquiring tapes. As a result of the company's collapse, Trebek only ended up receiving half of his salary and most, if not all, of the contestants that appeared on the show never received their cash winnings or merchandise prizes.

Trebek later commented that the show was an unfavorable experience, as the lack of payment came at a time when he "could have used the money" (he was getting divorced and commuting between Vancouver and southern California, where he was hosting Battlestars on NBC concurrently with Pitfall, at significant expense); furthermore, a dispute between Catalena and ACTRA, of which Trebek was a member, caused problems after Trebek had signed the contract, as Catalena was not a signatory of ACTRA's policies at the time. He also remarked about how it was a production based in his native Canada that caused the issue. Trebek also stated that he framed the bounced check from Catalena Productions for his $49,000 salary and hung it up at his home.

Trebek continued to refer to the show as "one of the great tragedies of his life" and has noted that it was the only time that he had not been paid his agreed salary for hosting duties.

== Original concept ==
According to the 2020 Game TV documentary series The Search for Canada's Game Shows, Pitfall was originally pitched by Catalena as a possible fall 1979 entry, with John Barton (who would ultimately serve as announcer for the eventual series two years later) as emcee and a different format that involved celebrities giving answers to Hollywood Squares-style questions; Nipsey Russell and Marty Allen were among those who participated in the pilot. Many years later, staff members recalled that the celebrity format was scrapped after one of the guest stars (Jack Carter) grabbed the cage area atop one of the elevators despite being warned not to, had his fingers crushed in the process and subsequently threatened a lawsuit. As a result, the series was shelved, with both the set and gameplay given considerable revamps over the next two years.
