= Strike It Rich (1986 game show) =

- Also known as: (The All-New) Strike It Rich
- Directed by: Richard S. Kline
- Presented by: Joe Garagiola
- Starring: Theresa Ring
- Announcer: Bob Hilton
- Country of origin: United States

Production
- Executive producer: Richard S. Kline
- Producer: Gary Cox
- Production companies: Kline and Friends; Bruce M. Sterten Productions; Ladd Framer Productions; Blair Entertainment

Original release
- Network: Syndication
- Release: September 15, 1986 – September 1987

Strike It Rich is an American game show that aired in syndication during the 1986–87 television season. It was hosted by Joe Garagiola with Theresa Ring as prize model (who only displayed the prizes in taped segments) and Bob Hilton as the announcer. The show was produced by Kline & Friends in association with Blair Entertainment.

== Main game ==
Two couples, one usually a returning champion, competed to move across a bi-level archway by answering trivia questions. Both levels had nine television monitors spanning from one end of the stage to the other, and seven of these monitors had buttons below them. Those monitors were always in play, as was the monitor at the end of each archway. The first monitor in each archway served as the starting position for the couples.

Play started with the couple on the bottom level (usually the returning champions), who were shown a category and five items related to it. Each of the five items were potential answers to questions asked by Garagiola, and the couple chose how many questions they wanted to answer, up to a maximum of three. If they answered all of those questions correctly, they would take control of their monitors. If not, the opposing couple was given a chance to gain control for themselves by giving the remaining correct answers. If they could not, the first couple would be shown the next category and answers.

After successfully completing their contract, a couple would begin moving down their archway. Each monitor displayed either a prize or the show's villain, the bandit. The couple had to successfully pass an amount of monitors equal to the number of questions in the contract. The bandit only appeared in one of the monitors, and his position was shuffled before each turn. The shuffle included all of the open monitors, including ones that might not have been in play on the couple's turn (especially early in the game, when the couples did not have a chance to make significant progress).

The couple pushed the button to determine what was concealed on the monitor. If anything other than the bandit was revealed, the couple won the prize and was given a choice to either stop, bank their prizes, and hold their position, or to keep going to try to pass the remaining monitors, if there were any. Once a contract was completed, the couple would be shown the next category and set of answers and asked whether or not they wanted to play on. Stopping would bank their prizes and pass control to the other couple, while continuing put any unbanked prizes at risk. If at any point the bandit came up, their turn would end, their position would be frozen, and any unbanked prizes would be lost. The couples could also lose unbanked prizes with an incorrect answer. If they reached a point where they needed less than three answers to reach the end of their archway, a couple was not allowed to select any more than the necessary amount of questions.

Once one of the couples passed the seventh monitor, one last question called the "Strike It Rich question" awaited them at the end of the archway. This question did not have multiple possible answers and thus did not require the use of the game board. Instead, the card bearing the question was placed in a holder on the monitor and its category was not revealed until Garagiola removed the card from its holder. The first couple to answer their Strike It Rich question won the game and moved on to the bonus round. As before, an incorrect answer lost any unbanked prizes and control. Each couple was able to keep whatever prizes they had banked, regardless of the outcome.

Games did not straddle episodes. If neither couple had reached the end of their archways before time was called, the couple furthest along would be asked their Strike It Rich question. If they answered correctly, they won the game. If not, the opposing couple got a chance to answer theirs for the win.

== Bonus game ==
In the bonus round, the winning couple had a chance to win $5,000 in cash and a car. Originally, couples had to choose between those two prizes. After several weeks, the choice changed to simply playing for the money or for both the money and the car.

Both sets of monitors were used, with one member of the team playing the top archway and the other the bottom. Before the round began, a series of bandits and pictures of the show's logo, referred to as "dollar signs", were shuffled into place on each archway. To begin, the couple chose whether to reveal what was hidden behind the top monitor or the bottom monitor. One of the monitors had a dollar sign ("STRIKE IT RICH" logo) hidden, the other a bandit, and the couple had an equal shot of uncovering both as they progressed.

Each revealed dollar sign was worth $100, while each bandit earned nothing. Depending on the chosen bonus prize, the couple had a certain objective to accomplish. If they chose to play for $5,000, the couple had to uncover five dollar signs and could not uncover more than two bandits. Playing for the car required six dollar signs, and the bandit could not appear more than once. If the couple revealed too many bandits (three if playing for $5,000 and two if playing for the car), the round ended and they were credited with any money from the previously revealed dollar signs.

Regardless of the outcome, each winning couple continued playing until they were defeated or exceeded the $75,000 winnings cap (imposed because the show aired on New York City’s flagship CBS station WCBS-TV, anything won above that went to the couple’s favorite charity).

== Episode status ==
All episodes of the series are presumed to exist. Buzzr debuted episodes of Strike it Rich on Amazon Prime on January 4, 2019. As of early 2020, the episodes were no longer available. Buzzr aired an episode of Strike It Rich on January 17, 2023, as part of its annual "Lost and Found" promotion.

== International versions ==
country	Local name	Host	Channel	Year aired
Australia	Strike It Lucky	Ronnie Burns	Nine Network	1994
France	L'arche d'or	Georges Beller	Antenne 2	1988–1989
United Kingdom	Strike It Lucky	Michael Barrymore	ITV	1986–1994
United Kingdom	Michael Barrymore's Strike It Rich	Michael Barrymore	ITV	1996–1999
