= Carol Merrill =

American TV game show model (born 1941)

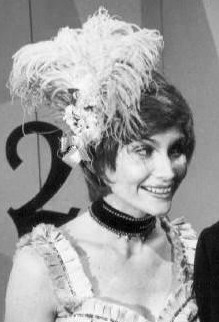
- Merrill on Let's Make a Deal, 1974
- Born: Carol Lue Hiller; January 19, 1941 (age 85); Frederic, Wisconsin, U.S.
- Occupations: Actress, Television game show model
- Years active: 1963-1977
- Spouse(s): Tom Merrill (m. 1960; div. 19??); Bernie Safire (m. 19??; div. 19??) Mark Burgess (m. 1985)
- Children: 1
- Relatives: Carla Gugino (niece)

Carol Merrill (née Carol Lue Hiller; born January 19, 1941) is an American former television game show model best known for her appearance in Let's Make a Deal during the show's original run from 1963 to 1977.

== Modeling ==
While on Let's Make a Deal, Merrill would model the various prizes, present money to contestants, and perform various other tasks as an assistant to host Monty Hall. On Let's Make a Deal, Merrill was frequently referred to by Monty Hall by her full name, and thus became one of the first game show models to be known as such, rather than the customary first-name-only naming convention used by such shows as The Price Is Right (which that show also changed with the current host/producer).

This allowed Merrill to gain wider recognition than other game show models of the time, and her celebrity status has led to many guest appearances on talk shows such as the Late Show with David Letterman, Good Morning America, and Geraldo. As Hall once put it,

"I never said 'door' without saying 'Carol Merrill.' 'Let's see what Carol Merrill has behind door No. 2.' 'What Carol Merrill has in the box.' So she and Jay Stewart, my announcer, became stars. Everywhere we went, people would say, 'How's Carol?' 'How's Jay?'"

Merrill, along with long-time Let's Make a Deal announcer Jay Stewart, made an appearance in 1986 on the finale of The All-New Let's Make a Deal, modeling a zonk (200 pounds of bananas) along with Stewart. After learning that the contestant traded $1,427 for the zonk, Merrill decided to let him have the $1,427 anyway while Stewart gave him a banana bunch to go with the money. Merrill has also appeared in 2010 and 2013 on the Wayne Brady version, and for a 60th anniversary (2023) episode broadcast in November 2023.

== Acting ==
In addition to her 14-year stint with Let's Make a Deal, Merrill was a model on the short-lived TV series Your Surprise Package, and for one episode of the TV series Burke's Law, both during 1963. She also played several other small roles in various films in the 1960s and early 1970s.

== Other interests ==
After Let's Make A Deal, Merrill began working in the natural health field. She has written articles on various personal health topics for two online newsletters.

In an interview on Late Night with David Letterman in 1982, Merrill stated that she was managing a restaurant in Malibu she was part owner of, The Whale Watch. In 1989, Merrill moved to Hawaii and spent several years working on various environmental issues. For her environmental work, she received the Hawaii County Mayor's Award of Excellence and the First Lady's Outstanding Volunteer Award from the State of Hawaii. From 2001-09, she and her husband, Mark Burgess, lived in Australia before returning to Hawaii. In later years, Merrill has reappeared on the Biography Channel's episode about Monty Hall, and on several episodes of Hollywood Squares.

== Personal life ==
Carol Lue Hiller's first husband was Richard Thomas "Tom" Merrill, whom she married in Los Angeles County, California, on July 17, 1960, at the age of nineteen. Her second husband, Bernie Safire, is the father of her only child, daughter Hillary Safire. Hillary appeared as the model for The New Truth or Consequences in 1987, and in the 1983 Sports Illustrated swimsuit issue. Carol Merrill has been married to Mark Burgess since 1985. Carol Merrill is the aunt of actress Carla Gugino, who has credited Merrill as being the person responsible for getting her interested in show business.

== References in popular culture ==
Merrill is mentioned by name in lyrics of the song "Door Number Three", written by Steve Goodman and Jimmy Buffett, and featured on Buffett's 1974 album A1A and on Goodman's 1975 album Jessie's Jig and Other Favorites.
