= Catalena Productions =

Canadian television production company

Catalena Productions was a Canadian television production company headquartered in Vancouver, British Columbia. It produced several notable television programs in the late 1970s and early 1980s before being forced into receivership in 1981.

== History ==
Catalena's first known production was a TV show featuring Stan Kann, a vacuum cleaner enthusiast and frequent guest on The Tonight Show, 13 episodes of which were taped at the Burnaby studios of BCTV. Another 19 episodes were taped in Edmonton at CITV, which would later sue the production company, claiming its contract entitled the station to a portion of gross proceeds earned from syndication.

In March 1980, Catalena announced it had secured a deal with Monty Hall and Stefan Hatos-Monty Hall Productions to produce 200 episodes of a revival of Let's Make a Deal in Vancouver for syndication to Canadian and U.S. stations. The program was filmed beginning later that year at the large Panorama Film Studios in West Vancouver. Two other major productions by Catalena at Panorama were also in the offing: Pitfall, a game show with an original format that began taping in October 1980, and a new syndicated variety show, Tom Jones, featuring Welsh singer Tom Jones which got underway in March 1981.

Financial problems, however, quickly engulfed Catalena Productions in the late summer of 1981. In early August, EPI Limited, which was distributing the Tom Jones show, sued Catalena after half of the episodes of the program had been completed. It charged Catalena with breach of contract for not paying certain agreed-to production fees and failing to hand over master tapes of the 12 completed shows. Production costs had reached $3.5 million, and EPI had charged Catalena with "financial irresponsibility" that imperiled its ability to continue producing the remainder of the series. Ian MacLennan, the president of Catalena, claimed that the EPI suit represented a "smear campaign" against a "strong and promising company". However, the company delayed production of further shows of Let's Make a Deal because there was sufficient inventory to satisfy the stations, and Catalena did not want to produce episodes until they were needed.

It turned out that EPI's forecast of financial doom for Catalena was correct. In mid-August, Hatos and Hall petitioned the Supreme Court of British Columbia for the appointment of a receiver to manage Catalena's financial affairs, claiming they were owed $210,000. On August 31, a Supreme Court judge found in their favour and placed the firm into bankruptcy. Creditors would find that there had been transfers between several related companies that confused the status of the firm's financial assets and that production costs for Tom Jones had exceeded budgeted expenses by $1 million.

The Tom Jones show survived the bankruptcy and lawsuit when a new production company, Clancy Grass Productions, took over the contract and hired 40 to 50 former Catalena employees to tape the 12 remaining programs. Game show contestants, however, were not so lucky. Because most game shows do not award prizes until the episode airs, and prizing is the responsibility of the producers, many contestants had won prizes on Let's Make a Deal and Pitfall that were no longer paid for. In the case of the latter show, which had not yet premiered, production staff—among them host Alex Trebek—were not paid. Television stations that had contracted to carry the show, including Vancouver's CKVU-TV, faced some difficulty acquiring tapes. Contestants on Let's Make a Deal were informed by Los Angeles–based promoter Global Promotions that they would not receive their promised prizes; Catalena owed Global $80,000 to $90,000, out of a total of $3 million in liabilities. Another large creditor was the Canadian government itself, owed $500,000 to $600,000. Because Catalena also owed moving and storage companies, some prizes were stuck in warehouses in Bellingham, Washington, with freight, storage, and customs duties owing. Despite Catalena's bankruptcy, stations such as the Global Television Network in Ontario continued to air Pitfall for years, irking contestants that were depicted winning prizes they never received as well as Trebek, who stated in an interview with the Archive of American Television that he was unable to prevent the show from airing because he was a low priority for payment.

Catalena's collapse left one notable Canadian creditor—Trebek—vowing never to do work in Vancouver again, though he relented in March 1982 when two old friends of his asked him to voice commercials for Greater Vancouver's Chrysler dealers. Trebek would note it was the only time he went unpaid as a game show host; he had the bounced check from Catalena for his $49,000 salary framed and hung it up at his home.
