= Tom Jones (TV program) =

Syndicated television variety show

- Also known as: The Tom Jones Show
- Genre: Variety show music
- Written by: Paul Wayne
- Directed by: Perry Rosemond
- Presented by: Tom Jones
- Opening theme: "It's Not Unusual"
- Country of origin: Canada
- Original language: English
- No. of seasons: 1
- No. of episodes: 24

Production
- Executive producers: Gordon Mills; Ian Robertson
- Producers: Perry Rosemond (producer); Paul Wayne (producer); Clancy Grass ("Produced by")
- Production locations: Pinewood Studios Vancouver, British Columbia, Canada
- Editors: Ken Hayward, Gastown Productions
- Production companies: Catalena Productions; Clancy Grass Productions, Inc.

Original release
- Network: syndicated
- Release: May 1980 – June 1981

Related
- This Is Tom Jones; Tom Jones: The Right Time

Tom Jones is a syndicated television variety show, hosted by Tom Jones, that aired during the 1980-1981 television season. Twenty-four episodes of the show were produced. The show was produced in Vancouver, British Columbia, Canada. The format of the show was for Tom Jones to perform his old hits and solo covers, in addition to new songs with special duet partners. Solo covers included Jones's version of "Unchained Melody" and the Eagles' "Take It to the Limit". Duet highlights from the show included Jones's duet with Tina Turner of Rod Stewart's "Hot Legs", in addition to his duet with Gladys Knight of "Guilty", written by the Bee Gees and originally made popular by Barry Gibb and Barbra Streisand. Other singers featured included Dionne Warwick, Chaka Khan, Donny Osmond, Marie Osmond and Stephanie Mills. Performances from the show have been issued in multiple DVD and CD editions.

The first 12 programs were produced by Catalena Productions, but Catalena and series distributor EPI Limited then sued each other; EPI charged Catalena with being fiscally irresponsible and failing to provide master videotapes of the completed programs. Clancy Grass Productions took over for the other 12 episodes. After Monty Hall and Stefan Hatos forced Catalena into receivership for failure to pay $210,000 in connection with a revival of Let's Make a Deal, it was revealed that costs for the first 12 episodes had exceeded their value by $1 million.

In March 2007, Tom Jones and Tom Jones Enterprises sued C/F International, a licensor of television shows founded by Burt Rosen, whose previous company, EPI Limited, co-distributed the programme in its first run with Alfred Haber, Inc. The lawsuit accused C/F International of improper licensing sound recordings made from the Tom Jones show. It was contended that any rights that C/F International had to license the Tom Jones show did not include the right to make and license separate recordings of the performances on the show. In addition, it was contended that any rights that C/F International had in the Tom Jones show no longer existed, due to numerous breaches of contract.
