= Panorama Film Studios =

Canadian production studio located in Vancouver

Panorama Film Studios, sometimes referred to as Hollyburn Film Studios, was a two sound stage and projection/dubbing theater complex constructed circa 1960 in the lower foothills of Hollyburn Mountain at West Vancouver, British Columbia, Canada. It was financed with help from UK investor(s), including Lord Folkestone, hence the name of the paved private road that ran from the Upper Levels Highway (Trans-Canada Highway 1) to the large studio parking lot. The studio address was 2280 Folkestone Way. Dirt mountain roads led from behind the studio up the side of Hollyburn mountain, at the time totally pristine tree-covered land. The building was eventually demolished and today the area is residential.

== Construction ==
The studio consisted of two buildings: a large concrete block/poured cement structure consisting of two large soundstages, two floors of offices and dressing rooms. There was also a large projection room/dubbing stage plus projection booth, 35 mm sound equipment machine rooms and four large editing rooms. The sound equipment installation, primarily supplied by RCA, was designed by Howard Tremaine, author of the famed Audio Cyclopedia, who moved from Hollywood to live in Sunset Beach/Lions Bay area just northwest of the studio. Previously Tremaine had worked at the USAF's Lookout Mountain Film Studio and also owned and operated the private film technology school University of Hollywood.

Behind the main sound stage/office building was a large "mill" where sets were constructed. Fenced-in large BC Hydro power transformers supplied the considerable power used on the stages.

The stages were purpose-designed, sound-proof structures with heavy sound deadening material on the walls and ceiling, overhead catwalks, sound locks for entry and even pneumatically-sealed large access doors at the rear. Tremaine had installed large wiring troughs of shielded audio cable, running from the stages to the machine room, presumably to allow recording and playback. The building was wired with "wig-wags", bells and flashing lights to warn of active filming.

The projection room had a large standard, perforated movie screen with an RCA-copy of a 'Voice of the Theater' horn speaker behind it. An RCA custom audio console was installed at the rear, used for mixing (re-recording). The projection booth featured two 35mm projectors with mechanically synchronized magnetic sound capabilities, and interlock capabilities to the machine room.

== History ==
The earliest production at Panorama was The Littlest Hobo, a television series that ran from 1963 to 1965. The Trap (released in 1966) and Robert Altman's That Cold Day in the Park (released in 1969) were early productions shot at Panorama. The sets for the former production stood on the two stages for several years, until they were demolished in 1970 for Mike Nichols' Carnal Knowledge.

The facility went bankrupt in the mid-1960s and most of the sound equipment was removed and sold.

In 1969, PBS Studios Limited/Coast Records moved from West 8th Avenue in Vancouver to lease the projection room and associated offices, converting the projection room into a recording studio for its eight track music recording studio. Tremaine had envisioned music recording in the projection theater and consequently the floor of the projection room was level and without theater seating. He had also designed a control booth, never used until PBS installed the first Ampex MM-1000 eight track one-inch recorder in Canada at Panorama. PBS's custom-built console included input channels made by Neve, Altec studio monitors, Dolby-A units plus an EMT plate reverb. The studio was equipped with a grand piano and Neumann U 87 microphones. PBS/Coast recorded and released a number of 45's featuring Vancouver-area artists such as the Seeds of Time, the Northwest Company, Spring and others. PBS also recorded the sound track to the low budget production Madeline Is, tracks for the band The Collectors, various albums and numerous radio spots and commercial jingles.

The film projection facility had fallen into disrepair and was modernized by Brent Jaybush of PBS Studios for use by the productions of the Carnal Knowledge and McCabe and Mrs. Miller, which were being shot roughly simultaneously. McCabe and Mrs Miller was shot at nearby Cypress Bowl, not at Panorama, but rented the projection facility from PBS Studios to run dailies.

Director Mike Nichols, film editor Sam O'Steen and PBS's Jaybush designed and built a portable 35 mm film sound recording system in the PBS workshop at Panorama and moved it to Nichol's Connecticut studio. Using principles derived from Howard Tremaine's blueprints for Panorama (provided to Jaybush by Tremaine's widow), a modern 35mm editing/post production facility was built at Bridgewater, Connecticut by Nichols in an almost 200-year-old barn.

While Carnal Knowledge was arguably the apex of Panorama's credentials, numerous other films and television productions were shot at Panorama throughout the 1970s and 1980s, including:

- Iceman (Timothy Hutton)
- The Groundstar Conspiracy (George Peppard)
- Let's Make a Deal (Monty Hall)
- Changeling Chessman Park Productions Ltd.
- Pitfall (Alex Trebek)
- CBC Television 1970 dance production
