= Let's Make a Deal =

American game show

- Also known as: The All New Let's Make a Deal (1984–86); Let's Make a Deal Primetime (2020–present); LMAD (since 2020)
- Genre: Comedy; Variety show; Game show; Musical comedy
- Created by: Stefan Hatos; Monty Hall
- Directed by: Joe Behar (1963–77, 1984–85); Geoff Theobald (1980–81); Hank Behar (1985–86); Barry Glazer (1990–91); James Marcione (1990–91); Morris Abraham (2003); R. Brian DiPirro (2006); Lenn Goodside (2009–present)
- Presented by: Monty Hall; Bob Hilton; Billy Bush; Wayne Brady
- Starring: Carol Merrill; Maggie Brown; Julie Hall; Karen LaPierre; Melanie Vincz; Diane Klimaszewski; Elaine Klimaszewski; Georgia Satelle; Brandi Sherwood; Rachel Reynolds; Alison Fiori; Tiffany Coyne; Danielle Demski; Chris Ahearn
- Announcer: Wendell Niles; Jay Stewart; Chuck Chandler; Brian Cummings; Dean Goss; Dean Miuccio; Vance DeGeneres; Rich Fields; Jonathan Mangum
- Theme music composer: Sheldon Allman (1963–77, 1984–86); Marilyn Hall (1963–77, 1984–86); Michel Camilo for Score Productions, Inc. (1984–86)
- Composers: Ivan Ditmars (1963–76); Stan Worth (1976–77, 1980–81); Sheldon Allman (1976–77, 1984–85); Todd Thicke (1985–86); Jerry Ray (1990–91); Cat Gray (2009–present); Walt Levinsky (2022–present)
- Country of origin: United States
- No. of episodes: NBC/ABC (1963–76): 3,784; Syndicated (1971–77): 281; Syndicated (1980-81): 195; Syndicated (1984–86): 340; NBC (1990–91): 128; NBC (2003): 3; CBS (2009–present): 2,000+

Production
- Executive producers: Stefan Hatos (1980–81, 1984–86); Dick Clark (1990–91); Ron Greenberg (1990–91); Monty Hall (2003); Sharon Hall (2003); David Garfinkle (2003); Jay Renfroe (2003); Jeff Mirkin (2003); Mike Richards (2009–2019); John Quinn (2019–present); Chris Ahearn (2024–present); Graham Shaw (2024–present); Wayne Brady (2025-present)
- Producers: Stefan Hatos (1963–77); Monty Hall (1980–81); Ian MacClennan (1980–81); Bob Synes (1984–86); Alan Gilbert (1984–86); Bruce Starin (1990–91); Paul Pieratt (1990–91); Ross Kaiman (2003); Gloria Fujita-O'Brien (2003)
- Production locations: NBC Studios, Burbank, California (1963–68, 1984–85, 2003); ABC Television Center, Hollywood, California (1968–76); Las Vegas Hilton, Las Vegas, Nevada (1976–77); Panorama Studios, West Vancouver, British Columbia (1980–81); Hollywood Center Studios, Hollywood (1985–86); Disney-MGM Studios, Orlando, Florida (1990–91); Tropicana Resort & Casino, Las Vegas (2009–10); Sunset Bronson Studios, Hollywood (2010–15); Raleigh Studios Hollywood (2015–17); Saticoy Studios, Van Nuys (2017–22); Quixote Studios, Sylmar (2022–23); Haven Studios, Atwater Village (2023–present)
- Running time: 22–26 minutes (1963–77, 1980–81, 1984–86, 1990–91); 44–52 minutes (2003, 2009–present)
- Production companies: Stefan Hatos-Monty Hall Productions (1963–77, 1980–81, 1984–86, 2009–2021); Catalena Productions (1980–81); Dick Clark Productions (1990–91); Ron Greenberg Productions (1990–91); Monty Hall Enterprises, Inc. (2003); Fremantle North America (2009–present); Glass Entertainment Group (2021–present)

Original release
- Network: NBC
- Release: December 30, 1963 – December 27, 1968
- Network: ABC
- Release: December 30, 1968 – July 9, 1976
- Network: Syndicated
- Release: August 30, 1971 – May 28, 1977
- Release: September 22, 1980 – May 22, 1981
- Release: September 17, 1984 – May 23, 1986
- Network: NBC
- Release: July 9, 1990 – January 4, 1991
- Release: March 4 – March 18, 2003
- Network: CBS
- Release: October 5, 2009 – present

Let's Make a Deal (also known as LMAD) is an American television game show that originated in the United States in 1963 and has since been produced in many countries throughout the world. The program was created and produced by Stefan Hatos and Monty Hall, the latter serving as its host for nearly 30 years.

The format of Let's Make a Deal involves selected members of the studio audience, referred to as "traders", making deals with the host. In most cases, a trader will be offered something of value and given a choice of whether to keep it or exchange it for a different item. The program's defining game mechanism is that at least one of the items is hidden from the trader until the choice has been made. Only after the items are revealed does the trader learn if they have chosen something of a higher or lower value than their starting item, or if they have received a comedic "zonk" prize with little or no value.

When Let's Make a Deal first started, contestants wore suits and dresses, normal attire for the time. In short order, however, audience members began to dress in outrageous and unique costumes to increase their chances of being selected as a trader, and that has become a signature feature of the show.

The current edition of Let's Make a Deal has aired on CBS since October 5, 2009, when it took over the spot on the network's daytime schedule vacated by the soap opera Guiding Light. Wayne Brady is the host of the current series, with Jonathan Mangum as his announcer/assistant. Tiffany Coyne is the current model, joining in 2010, with musician Cat Gray in 2011.

The 15th season of the current version premiered on September 25, 2023, and six primetime episodes were filmed during the season. One is the show's Christmas primetime episode, and five more were broadcast in January and February 2024, between seasons of Survivor.

The show is owned by Glass Entertainment Group (owned by Nancy Glass) following an August 2021 acquisition of Hatos-Hall assets, with Sharon Hall, a former Endemol Shine executive, as the consultant.

As of January 2022, CAN'T STOP media has been in charge of the format's international distribution.

== Broadcast history ==
Let's Make a Deal first aired on NBC on December 30, 1963, as part of its daytime schedule. After 1,257 episodes on NBC Daytime and 16 episodes on NBC Primetime, the show moved to ABC on December 30, 1968, where it remained until July 9, 1976; and on two occasions the show was given a weekly nighttime spot on those networks. The first syndicated edition of Let's Make a Deal premiered on August 30, 1971. Distributed by ABC Films, and then by its successor Worldvision Enterprises once the fin-syn rules were enacted, the series ran until 1977 and aired weekly.

The show originally premiered at 2:00 pm Eastern (1:00 pm Central), replacing the game show People Will Talk. After 5 months, it was moved to 1:30 pm Eastern (12:30 pm Central), to make the show a runaway hit. The show had practically no trouble whatsoever against As the World Turns on CBS and mostly drama reruns on ABC. After the show moved to ABC, the show continues to be a hit and dominant at 1:30 pm, this time facing off against game shows on NBC.

In 1975, the trouble came to an end, when former lead-out Days of Our Lives expanding to an hour, and started beating Deal, drawing away younger audiences. Also that year, ABC lured away Fred Silverman from CBS, and wanted to revamp the network's daytime image. During the week of December 1–8, 1975, the show went to an hour-long format, with the intention of making it permanent if successful. Although Deal continued to produce high ratings in the 1:30 pm slot, Silverman moved the show to noon, replacing Showoffs, thus putting it up against High Rollers and The Magnificent Marble Machine on NBC and The Young and the Restless on CBS at first, moving Rhyme and Reason to Deal's former timeslot and The Neighbors and later Break the Bank to Rhyme and Reason's former time slot. Silverman, ABC head of daytime programming Michael Brockman and other ABC executives were surprised, though when Deal actually beat The Magnificent Marble Machine in the ratings, the show actually failed to draw, a 30 share that NBC daytime executives required a show to have in order to stay on its daytime schedule. Marble went into reruns afterward due to the delay of the planned replacement The Fun Factory, and after the strike ended, NBC picked up The Fun Factory on June 14, 1976, which ran about even with Let's Make a Deal in the ratings, with The Fun Factory having perhaps a slight lead, due to its more traditional housewife target audience.

However, Brockman and ABC president Silverman were not interested in seeing an aging show like Let's Make a Deal stand in the way of his plans for a more youthful image for ABC's daytime lineup, so he resolved to cancel the daytime series outright. On July 9, 1976, the show came to an end on daytime, on July 12, Hot Seat (a Heatter-Quigley series) took over the timeslot, but it did not last long as Deal had and the more successful Family Feud took over the 1:30 slot once owned for the past few years by Deal. The daytime run intended to come back with a new host, but never happened. The nighttime show continued in syndication, moved production to Las Vegas Hilton, but this too ended on May 21, 1977, and Hall moved on to host a short-lived NBC game It's Anybody Guess, but did not last long.

A revival of the series based in Hall's native Canada was launched in 1980 and aired in syndication on American and Canadian stations for one season. This series was produced by Catalena Productions and distributed in America by Rhodes Productions, Catalena's partner company; Catalena was forced into bankruptcy by an unpaid Monty Hall in August 1981. In the fall of 1984, the series returned for a third run in syndication as The All-New Let's Make a Deal. Running for two seasons until 1986, this series was distributed by Telepictures.

NBC revived Let's Make a Deal twice in 13 years. The first was a daytime series in 1990 that was the first to not be produced or hosted by Monty Hall. Instead, the show was a production of Ron Greenberg and Dick Clark, and featured Bob Hilton (best known for announcing other game shows) as host (although Hall would eventually return as guest host after Hilton's dismissal).

A primetime edition was launched in 2003 but drew poor ratings and was canceled after three of its intended five episodes had aired. This version had reporter Billy Bush as host, and had a significantly larger budget.

A partial remake called Big Deal, hosted by Mark DeCarlo, was broadcast on Fox in 1996. In 1998 and 1999, Buena Vista Television (now Disney–ABC Domestic Television) was in talks with Stone-Stanley (the producers of Big Deal) to create a revival hosted by Gordon Elliott, but it was never picked up. The show was one of several used as part of the summer series Gameshow Marathon on CBS in 2006, hosted by Ricki Lake.

Alison Fiori models one of the CBS version's zonk prizes, a live llama.

The current edition of Let's Make a Deal premiered on October 5, 2009. Like the show it replaced, Guiding Light, CBS gives affiliates two options on when to air the game show. Some markets, particularly those in Eastern time such as flagship WCBS-TV, air Let's Make a Deal at 10:00 am to serve as the lead in to The Price Is Right. Others air the game show in the 3:00 pm Eastern slot where Guiding Light traditionally had aired, where as of 2025 it serves as the lead out program for the serial Beyond the Gates. (In all other time zones outside the Eastern Time Zone, the programs start an hour earlier.)

Although the current version of the show debuted in September 2009, long after The Price Is Right (which made the switch in 2008, first with primetime episodes in February, then daytime in September) and the two Bell created daytime soap operas had made the switch to high definition, Let's Make a Deal was, along with Big Brother, one of only two programs across the five major networks that was still being actively produced in standard definition. For the start of production for its 2014–15 season in June 2014, Let's Make a Deal began being produced in high definition, with Big Brother 16 making the switch later in June. Let's Make a Deal was the last remaining CBS program to make the switch by air date, with the first HD episode airing on September 22, 2014.

In 2020, Let's Make a Deal Primetime on CBS was announced, making the show one of the first to appear in primetime on the three legacy networks as a regular primetime series. Three primetime episodes were announced, with the first airing on October 27 as part of CBS launching both of their daytime game shows' pandemic-delayed seasons in primetime, the second on December 1 featuring guest star Phil Keoghan, and the third, a Holiday-themed episode with families on December 22. Three more primetime episodes aired during the 2021–22 season and four primetime episodes were filmed and planned to air in April and May during the 2022–23 season, but concerns over the Writers Guild of America and SAG-AFTRA labor disputes (the show is under a collective bargaining agreement for daytime shows signed in 2022) led to the four Season 14 broadcasts being moved to the 2023–24 season as part of moves to allow CBS original programming to continue in case of potential labor stoppages. Both unions eventually went on strike, and in July 2023, those episodes, along with new The Price Is Right at Night episodes for Season 52, were announced as replacement programming. The Let's Make a Deal episodes aired Fridays from November 3–17, 2023 in the 8:00 p.m. EDT time slot before Thanksgiving. Season 15 primetime episodes aired on two consecutive Mondays (November 27 and December 4), with additional episodes in January and February 2024, including the network's Super Bowl LVIII themed episode (both CBS Daytime game shows aired on February 7 at night featuring themes related with the game that CBS broadcast) and a Valentine's Day themed episode on February 14.

=== Accommodations for COVID-19 pandemic ===
From Season 12 (2020–21) to Season 14 (2022–23), Let's Make a Deal filmed with a hybrid of audience members in-studio seated in pods as well as virtual traders playing from their homes during the COVID-19 pandemic (nicknamed "At-Homies") that delayed the start of Season 12. According to executive producer John Quinn, all COVID-19 protocols are in effect during production, including social distancing, testing, masks (only for crewmembers and while off set), and personal protective equipment.

== Past personnel ==
The family of Monty Hall has been involved in all versions in one form or another since the original episode in 1963. Monty was the host of nearly every episode of Let's Make a Deal that aired from 1963 until 1986. This encompassed the entire original daytime series, which ran until 1976, as well as the accompanying primetime episodes that aired on both NBC and ABC and the three syndicated productions that launched in 1971, 1980, and 1984. He was absent only twice during that span due to illness; in 1971 Dennis James was called on to substitute while in 1985 Geoff Edwards hosted a week of episodes while Hall recovered from a bout of laryngitis.

Bob Hilton became the new host for the NBC 1990 series; however, due to low ratings, Hilton was fired from the show and in October 1990, Hall returned to the show (but was announced as "guest host") and remained as host until the series was canceled in January 1991. Billy Bush emceed the 2003 series, with Hall making a cameo appearance in one episode.

Each Let's Make a Deal announcer also served as a de facto assistant host, as many times the announcer would be called upon to carry props across the trading floor. The original announcer for the series was Wendell Niles, who was replaced by Jay Stewart in 1964. Stewart remained with Let's Make a Deal until the end of the syndicated series in 1977. The 1980 Canadian-produced syndicated series was announced by Chuck Chandler. The 1984 syndicated series had Brian Cummings in the announcer/assistant role for its first season, with disc jockey Dean Goss taking the position for the following season. The 1990 NBC revival series was announced by Dean Miuccio, with the 2003 edition featuring Vance DeGeneres in that role. The 2009 (current) CBS version features Jonathan Mangum, although co-executive producer Chris Ahearn (nicknamed "Money Fairy") is his backup, filling in for Mangum on a few episodes during Season 14 when Mangum was not cleared to participate in taping because of illness. After Season 14, Mangum surpassed Stewart as the longest serving announcer in the show's franchise history.

Carol Merrill served as the prize model on the original 1963 series for its entire run, ending in 1977. She served for 14 seasons. The models on the 1980s series were Maggie Brown, Julie Hall (1980), Karen LaPierre, and Melanie Vincz (1984). For the 1990 series, the show featured Georgia Satelle and identical twins Elaine and Diane Klimaszewski, who later gained fame as the Klimaszewski Twins.

Hall (2010 and 2013) and Merrill (2013) both appeared on the current Brady version, each making one-week appearances. The 2013 celebration of the franchise's 50th anniversary was Hall's last official appearance on the show prior to his death, but Hall also appeared in 2017 CBS publicity shots with Brady as part of a CBS Daytime publicity photo celebrating the network's daytime ratings. Hall served as a consultant on the show from 2009 until his death, although episodes which he worked continued to air into 2018 because of taping delays (Hall's death resulted in a later-season episode to be repurposed and aired earlier as a memorial episode). Following the 2021 Marcus/Glass acquisition of Hatos-Hall, television executive Sharon Hall, Monty's daughter, was named consultant.

When the current version debuted in 2009 at Las Vegas, Alison Fiori was the show's original model, lasting for much of the first season in Las Vegas before the show moved to Los Angeles. Danielle Demski serves as the show's backup model, having been involved in most Season 5 episodes with Coyne on parental leave, and in Season 11 when Coyne was unavailable. In 2023, Coyne surpassed Merrill as the longest serving hostess in franchise history.

== Production ==
=== Production locations ===
The original daytime series was recorded at NBC Studios in Burbank, California, and then at ABC Television Center in Los Angeles once the program switched networks in 1968. The weekly syndicated series also taped at ABC Television Center, doing so for its first five seasons. After ABC cancelled the daytime series in 1976, production of the syndicated series ceased there as well and the sixth and final season was recorded in the ballroom of the Westgate Las Vegas hotel in Las Vegas, Nevada.

The 1980 Canadian series was taped at Panorama Film Studios in West Vancouver, British Columbia, which production company Catalena Productions used as its base of operations. The All-New Let's Make a Deal taped its first season of episodes in Burbank at NBC Studios, then moved to Sunset Las Palmas Studios (known as Hollywood Center Studios at the time) in Hollywood for the second and final season. The 1990 NBC daytime series was recorded at Disney-MGM Studios on the grounds of Walt Disney World near Orlando, Florida. The 2003 revival returned production to Burbank.

The current edition of the series first originated from the Tropicana outside of Las Vegas. The show returned for good to Los Angeles in 2010, first at Sunset Bronson Studios from 2010 to 2015 and later at Raleigh Studios from 2015 to 2017. From 2017 to 2022, the show taped at Saticoy Studios in Van Nuys. During the 2022–23 season, the show taped at Quixote Studios in Sylmar. Beginning in its 2023–24 season, the show will be taping at Haven Studios in Atwater Village; the facility is leased by Fremantle, and will also house The Price is Right and other Fremantle-produced game shows in California.

=== Music ===
The theme music for the 1963–77 versions was composed by Sheldon Allman. The theme, along with all incidental music, was performed by an in-studio combo led by Ivan Ditmars, consisting of an electric organ, guitar, drums, and on the nighttime version, a harp. In some seasons of the nighttime show, the combo was further augmented by a horn section. The final season of the nighttime show taped in Las Vegas eliminated the in-studio band in favor of pre-recorded tracks, due to Ivan Ditmars' retirement.

The 1980–81 theme, composed by Stan Worth, was an updated version of the original theme, with more of a disco sound.

The 1984–86 version featured a brand new theme provided by Score Productions, although original composer Sheldon Allman returned as music director for the first season. Todd Thicke replaced Allman in that role for the second season. Both music directors used music from previous Hatos-Hall shows, such as Split Second and It's Anybody's Guess as incidental cues during the show.

The 2009 revival features another new theme composed by Brian Teed. Since 2011, keyboardist Cat Gray has provided in-studio musical accompaniment.

== Format ==
=== Gameplay ===
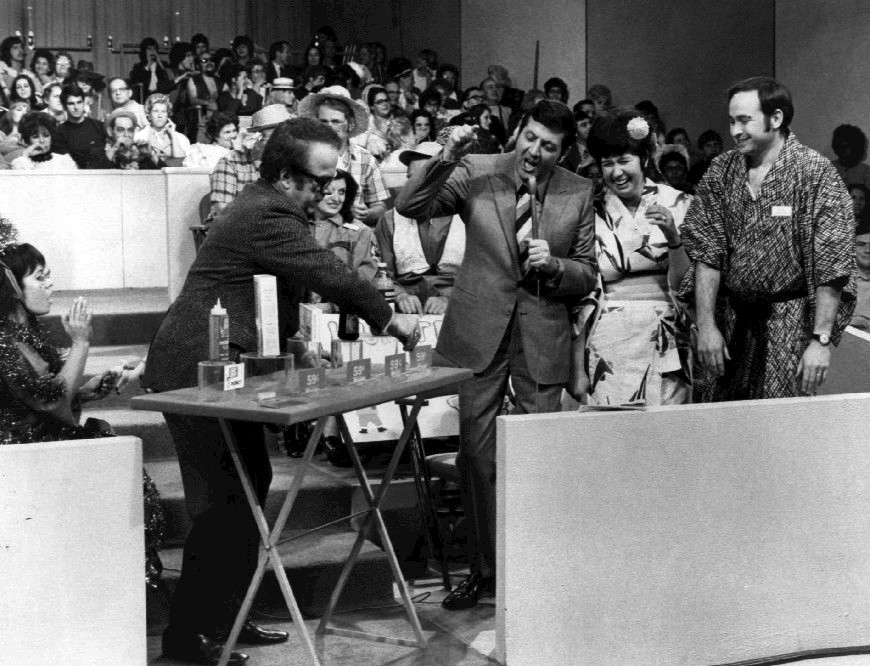
Jay Stewart and Monty Hall on the original version of the show.

Each episode of Let's Make a Deal consists of several "deals" between the host and one or more members of the studio audience, referred to as "traders". Audience members are picked at the host's whim as the show moves along, and married couples are often selected to play together as traders. The deals are mini-games within the show that take several formats.

In the simplest format, a trader is given a prize or cash amount of medium value (on the order of a few hundred dollars), and the host offers them the opportunity to trade for an unknown prize. This latter item may be concealed on the stage behind one of three curtains, within a large "box" onstage (large panels painted to look like a box), inside a smaller box carried on a tray, or occasionally in other formats. On occasion, the initial prize may itself be hidden by a cortain/box, or cash may be packaged in such a way that the contestant can only see the outermost bill(s). Any prize too large to fit within its container (box, envelope, etc.) is represented by a photograph or other such symbol.

Technically, traders are supposed to bring something to trade in, but this rule has seldom been enforced. On several occasions, a trader is actually asked to trade in an item such as their shoes or purse, only to receive the item back at the end of the deal as a "prize". On at least one occasion, the purse was taken backstage and a high-valued prize such as the ignition key to a new car was put into it.

Prizes generally consist of either cash or merchandise with genuine value, such as a trip, electronics, furniture, appliances, or a car. At times, a small prize (typewriter, pocket tape recorder, etc.) may contain a cash bonus or a written/recorded message awarding cash or a larger prize to a trader who has chosen it.

=== Zonks ===
Traders who choose boxes or curtains are at risk of receiving booby prizes called "zonks", which can be outlandish items (live animals, junked cars, giant articles of clothing, etc.) or legitimate prizes with relatively very little value (wheelbarrows, giant teddy bears, piles of food, etc.). On rare occasions, a trader receives a zonk that proves to be a cover-up for a valuable prize, such as a fur coat hidden inside a garbage can; or one that has genuine value in its own right, such as an antique pie wagon whose value was stated at $3,300 only after a trader decided to give it away.

Though usually considered joke prizes, traders legally win the zonks. However, after the taping of the show, any trader who had been zonked is offered a consolation prize (currently $100) instead of having to take home the actual zonk. This is partly because some of the zonks are impractical or physically impossible to receive or deliver to the traders (such as live animals or a stagehand wearing an animal costume), or the props are owned by the studio. A disclaimer at the end of the credits of later 1970s episodes read: "Some traders accept reasonable duplicates of zonk prizes." Starting in the 2012–13 season, CBS invited viewers to provide zonk ideas to producers. Whenever a viewer-submitted zonk appeared on the show, the announcer credited its originator. At the end of the season, the viewer whose zonk was judged the most creative won $2,500. The contest has been continued throughout the past several seasons after its 2012 introduction. In some deals, it is possible to win both an actual prize or cash as well as a zonk.

=== Quickie Deals ===
As the end credits of the show roll, it is typical for the host to ask random members of the studio audience to participate in fast deals. In the current CBS version, these are often referred to as "quickie deals", and are conducted by the hosts. Marcus/Glass will post information on the show's Twitter address (@LetsMakeADeal) days before taping to encourage audience members to carry certain items in their pockets to win an additional $100–$500 when any of the hosts asks to see such items. The deals are usually in the form of the following:

- Offering cash to a person for possessing a certain item.
- Offering cash to a person for answering a question about what happened earlier in the show.
- Paying a small cash amount for each instance of a certain item (coins, paperclips, etc.) that a person can produce.
- Offering cash for each instance of a particular digit in the serial number on a dollar bill, driver's license, etc.
- Offering to pay the last check in the person's checkbook, if they had one, up to a certain limit (usually $500 or $1,000).
- Offering cash to one person if they can correctly state the exact value of the Big Deal of the Day, or the name of the trader who played for it.
- Offering $500 to one person if they brought a specified item listed on the show's Twitter account.
- Offering cash to one person if they can correctly choose which one of two photos appeared on the show's Instagram account.
- Offering cash to one person if they can correctly answer a question relating to their costume.
- Offering cash to one person if they can correctly guess how much money ($100, $200, or $300) was in the announcer's hand.

During Season 13 and 14 (2021–23), as the show modified its format due to the COVID pandemic, traders at home play the Quickie Deals round the same way as the in-studio traders.

=== Other deal formats ===
Deals are often more complicated than the basic format described above. Additionally, some deals take the form of games of chance, and others are played as pricing games.

==== Trading deals ====
Types of trading deals employed on the show include:

- Choosing one of several envelopes/wallets/purses that contain various amounts of money. At least one of them conceals a pre-announced value (usually $1 or $5), which awards a car or trip; the others contain larger amounts as consolation prizes. Each trader must decide whether to keep or trade the one he/she chose.
- Making decisions for another person, such as a spouse or a series of unrelated traders, or every member of a team receiving the same item based on majority vote. Sometimes after several offers, a team is broken up and each individual trader can make one final deal on his/her own.
- Two or more traders guessing the weight of a studio audience member chosen by the host, or their own combined weight, with cash awarded to the trader whose guess is closer.
- Being told the weight or number of items in a prize behind a box or curtain, and then choosing to keep it or sell it back to the host for a certain price per pound/item.
- Being offered a quantity of some foreign currency, then deciding whether to receive its equivalent in United States dollars or exchange it for a box/curtain.
- Being offered a chance to put a $1 bill through a set of rollers and receive whatever denomination they eject, or exchange it for a box/curtain.
- Being presented with an item having an unknown cash value, such as a claim check or gift certificate, and deciding whether to keep or trade it. Variations have included a cash box, to which the host adds packets of money at intervals; a shopping bag, to which he adds grocery items containing money; or a package of some grocery item such as candy or gum that may or may not contain money. Over the course of the episode, the trader holding the item is given several opportunities to exchange it for a box, curtain, or chance to win a large prize; in each case, the option he/she declines is given to another trader. Typically, but not always, the last trader holding the item is given the first chance to return it and play for the Big Deal. The total cash value of the item (if any) is revealed only after the trader has made his/her decision or, on occasion, during the closing credits.

==== Games of chance ====
A wide variety of chance-based games have been used on the show. Examples:

- Collecting a certain amount of money hidden inside wallets, envelopes, etc., or by pressing unlabeled buttons on a cash register, in order to reach a pre-stated "selling price" for a larger prize, such as a car, trip or larger amount of cash. Typically, there may also be one or more zonk items hidden which end the game immediately and forfeit all winnings if found. The trader may choose to stop at any time and keep all the money found. The cash register game used 15 buttons, two of which would ring up "No Sale" as the zonk. If a trader found one of these, he/she was offered a chance to press one more button and receive the amount rung up (sometimes doubled by the host), or win either a larger amount or the grand prize for finding the other "No Sale". In the current CBS version, the game is played using a board with 13 cash amounts and two zonks.
- Choosing one of several items in the hope that it will lead to cash or a prize (e.g., a key that unlocks a safe, or an egg that is raw instead of hard-boiled). Before the host tests the chosen item to see if it is a winner, the trader is offered a chance to exchange it for a box/curtain. This game is often played with multiple traders, and more than one of the offered items may win the prize.
- Games involving a deck of cards in which a trader must find matching cards, draw cards that reach a cumulative total within a certain number of draws, draw a certain number of cards from a certain suit to win a designated prize (with one suit always designated as going toward a "zonk", which ends the game with nothing won), etc. to win a prize or additional money.
- Receiving clues about an unknown prize (such as a partial spelling of the prize or clues in the form or rap, rhyme, etc.) and deciding whether to take the unknown prize or a cash prize.
- Choosing face-down number cards from a board in the hope of winning prizes by out-scoring a rival trader or the host.
- Receiving money in the form of a long strip of bills dispensed one at a time from a machine. The trader can end the game at any time and keep the accumulated money, but he/she forfeits it if a blank sheet or a card marked "curtains" appears. Updated versions of the game involve an ATM; the trader swipes a card through a reader slot and receives cash, but an "overdrawn" message on the screen at any time ends the game and forfeits the money.
- Choosing between a known cash prize and a chance to spin a carnival wheel, which can award a car, larger/smaller cash amounts, or a zonk.
- Rolling dice to receive cash based upon the roll or achieving a cumulative score within a certain number of rolls to win a larger prize.
- Choosing numbers from a board after a brief look at what is behind them (cash, prizes, zonks). The trader keeps all cash/prizes matched and may stop after any turn, but loses everything upon finding two zonks.

Depending on the game, the trader is given the opportunity to stop playing at various points, keeping any cash/prizes already won or accepting an offer of a guaranteed prize, or continue to play and risk losing.

==== Pricing games ====
Prior to the debut of the CBS version, many deals required traders to guess the prices of grocery items or small prizes in order to win a large prize, and were often conducted with multiple participants competing against each other. Formats have included:

- Guessing each price within a range given by the host. When cash was at stake, the trader won a set amount for the first successful guess and would either double it or receive more for each additional one, depending on the rules.
- Guessing the prices of several items such that the total of all the errors was less than an allowance given by the host, or such that the totals of the guesses and the actual prices agreed to within a stated margin.
- Choosing two items with the same price.
- Choosing a single item that matched a target price given by the host, or a combination of items that added up to it.
- (Multi-player) The trader who guessed closest to the correct price on each item won cash, with a certain amount required to buy the large prize. At times, the host would double the payout if a trader guessed the price exactly.

These games are not used on the CBS version because of their similarities to The Price Is Right.

==== Quiz games ====
On the CBS version, due to the similarities of the pricing game concept with The Price Is Right, quiz games are used instead. These deals involve products in the form of when they were introduced to the market, general knowledge quizzes, currency exchange rates (at the time of taping), or knowledge of geography of trips to certain locales used as prizes.

=== Big Deal ===
The Big Deal serves as the final segment of the show and offers a chance at a significantly larger prize for a lucky trader. Before the round, the value of the day's Big Deal is announced to the audience.

The process for choosing traders (two up to 2003, one since 2009) has remained the same. Starting with the highest winner, the host asks traders if they are willing to trade in everything they have won to that point for a chance to choose one of three numbered doors on the stage. The process continues until a trader agrees to play by saying "I'm going for the Big Deal", leading to a commercial break. Up to 2003, a second trader was chosen in this fashion and the higher winner of the two received first pick of the doors. In case of a tie between two or more traders, the host starts with the trader that was selected first.

Each of the doors conceals either a prize package of some sort, or a cash award hidden inside a prop such as a bank vault, piggy bank, or blank check. On occasion, a door containing an all-cash prize is opened before the traders make their choices, but the amount of the prize is not revealed.

Before 2003, a non-Big Deal door chosen by one of the traders would be opened first, and the Big Deal door would be opened last whether it had been chosen or not. This procedure is followed in the majority of episodes since 2009, although occasionally the Big Deal door is instead opened second when a trader has chosen it.

The Big Deal prize is usually the most extravagant on each episode, and is often a car, a vacation with first-class accommodations, or a collection of high-value furniture/appliances. On occasion, the Big Deal consists of one of the all-cash prizes mentioned above; at other times, a cash bonus is added to the prizes in the Big Deal to bring the total up to the announced value. On other occasions, the prize consists of "Everything in the Big Deal", which awards the cash/merchandise behind all three doors to the trader who chooses it.

Traders who have won zonks become eligible for the Big Deal only if not enough winners of actual cash/prizes volunteer to play. The Big Deal is the only time during the show in which participants are guaranteed to receive a genuine prize, although it may be of lower value than the one(s) they trade away. (On the pilot episode only, a zonk was placed behind one of the doors; however, it was not chosen.)

==== Super Deal ====
During the 1975–76 syndicated season, winners of the Big Deal were offered a chance to win the "Super Deal". At this point, Big Deals were limited to a range of $8,000 to $10,000. The trader could risk their Big Deal winnings on a shot at adding a $20,000 cash prize, which was hidden behind one of three mini-doors onstage. The other two doors contained cash amounts of $1,000 or $2,000; however, the $1,000 value was later replaced with a "mystery" amount between $1,000 and $9,000. A trader who decided to play risked their Big Deal winnings and selected one of the mini-doors. If the $20,000 prize was behind the door, the trader kept the Big Deal and added the $20,000 prize, for a potential maximum total of $30,000. However, a trader who selected one of the other two doors forfeited the Big Deal prizes but kept the cash amount behind the door. The Super Deal was discontinued when the show permanently moved to Las Vegas for the final season (1976–77), and Big Deal values returned to the previous range of $10,000 to $15,000.

From 2012 to 2016 of the Brady version, the Super Deal was offered as a limited event (usually for a week of shows promoted as "Super Deal Week"). In this version, the top cash prize was $50,000 while the other two cash prizes were $1,000 and $2,000. In addition, instead of using mini-doors, the cash amounts were hidden in three large colored envelopes of red, green, and blue, respectively referred by Brady as ruby, emerald, and sapphire.

=== Trip-Tastic ===
A "Trip-Tastic" game was played during the first week of the 2019–20 season on the Brady version. At three different points during each episode, the assistant would hand a golden ticket to a trader, enabling them to play the game. The traders were shown a world map with three envelopes attached, and they each chose one in the same order that they received their tickets. Cash prizes of $500 and $1,000 were hidden in two of the envelopes, while the third one awarded three trips.

=== Mega-Deal week ===
During the first week of the 2015–16 and 2016–17 seasons on the Brady version, any trader who won a Big Deal had a chance to win the day's "Mega-Deal", which consisted of every non-cash, non-zonk prize offered during the episode. The Big Deal trader would choose both one of the three doors and one of seven cards (reduced by one for every day in which the Mega-Deal went unclaimed during the week). Only if the trader won the Big Deal would the chosen card be revealed; if it was the Mega-Deal card, they won all the prizes, including whatever they had traded away to play the Big Deal. Regardless of the outcome, the trader received the prize(s) in the Big Deal.

=== Mash-Up Week ===
The week of May 9, 2016, was designated Mash-Up Week. During each of the five broadcast days, Deal and sister show The Price Is Right each featured one game from the other's lineup. The games were slightly modified to reflect the nature of the shows on which they were played; those on The Price Is Right were modified to add a pricing element, while those on Deal used random draws and the offer of cash/prize deals to stop a game early. Mash-Up Week returned to both shows the week of March 23, 2020.

=== Themed days ===
Beginning in season 13, the show began to feature themed days in which at least one deal features a major, high-valued prize within a specific category (such as a cash prize, trip, or vehicle):

- Mega Money Mondays episodes feature a large cash prize (usually ranging from $10,000 to $50,000) that is awarded at some point during the show, usually as either the main prize of a deal, or as part of a larger prize package. On occasion, this prize has also been hidden within a Zonk, or awarded as part of a Quickie Deal when it was left unclaimed during the show proper.
- Worldwide Wednesdays episodes utilize a similar format to Mega Money Mondays, except with the signature prize being a high-valued trip worth at least $20,000. This feature was retired halfway through Season 17.
- Fabulous Car Fridays episodes feature one game played for a high-priced luxury car; in these episodes, the second "car game" is usually played for cash rather than a car. It was first held as a feature in season 13; in season 14, the feature was limited to two special weeks of episodes, both billed as Fabulous Car Week. After a hiatus for season 15, the feature returned for season 16.

The primetime episode on November 17, 2023, featured all three of these deals throughout the show, as well as a "Taco Tuesday" deal (themed around Tiffany driving a taco truck), and "Throwback Thursday" (which featured clips of Monty Hall and Carol Merrill from the original run and Hall's guest appearances on the Brady version). Beginning in Season 17, in order to lower production costs, only one special day of shows are offered on a rotational basis.

== Reception ==
Upon the original Let's Make a Deal's debut, journalist Charles Witbeck was skeptical of the show's chances of success, noting that the previous four NBC programs to compete with CBS's Password had failed. Some critics described the show as "mindless" and "demeaning to traders and audiences alike".

By 1974, however, the show had spent more than a decade at or near the top of daytime ratings, and became the highest-rated syndicated primetime program. It was so popular that, when Hall moved Let's Make a Deal to ABC because of a contract dispute, doing so greatly damaged NBC's daytime ratings and greatly improved ABC's. The show held the world's record for the longest waiting list for tickets in show-business history; there were 350 seats available for each show, and a wait time of two to three years after requesting a ticket.

In 2001, Let's Make a Deal was ranked as No. 18 on TV Guide's list of "The 50 Greatest Game Shows of All Time". In 2006, GSN aired a series of specials counting down its own list of the "50 Greatest Game Shows of All Time", on which Let's Make a Deal was No. 7.

In 2014, the American series won a Daytime Creative Arts Emmy Award for Outstanding Original Song for "30,000 Reasons to Love Me", composed by Cat Gray and sung by Wayne Brady.

== Episode status ==
- 1960s NBC Daytime: Believed to be fully wiped due to NBC's policy on wiping shows at this time.
- ABC Daytime: A clip from the ABC daytime premiere was used on the Biography episode profiling Hall, which aired during the series' "Game Show Week" in December 1999. Another episode from 1969 was found, which features a gaffe that Hall himself rated as his most embarrassing moment on Let's Make a Deal – at the end of the show, he attempted to make a deal with a woman carrying a baby's bottle. Noting that it had a removable rubber nipple, he offered the woman $100 if she could show him another nipple (she did not do so). Episodes substitute-hosted by Dennis James exist in his personal library; a portion of one such episode is widely circulated as part of a pitch film for James' version of The Price Is Right.
- ABC Nighttime/1971–77 Syndicated: Episodes have been seen on GSN in the past. The CBN Cable Network reran the syndicated series in the 1980s and its successor, The Family Channel, from June 7, 1993 to March 29, 1996. Buzzr also aired the series in 2015 and 2016.
- The 1980–81 version continued to air in reruns on Canada's Global Television Network through the late 1980s.
- The 1984–86 syndicated version has been seen on GSN in the past. Reruns previously aired on the USA Network from December 29, 1986 to December 30, 1988 and The Family Channel from August 30, 1993 to March 29, 1996. Buzzr began airing episodes from 1985 on June 1, 2016; this version returned to Buzzr's schedule on September 30, 2019, then aired until March 20, 2021, and will return July 18, 2022, for a limited run then will permanently return to the Buzzr schedule on August 1, 2022. GameTV in Canada aired 40 episodes of this version starting in July 2018, as part of their Game Show Retro block, until it was dropped in October 2018.
- The 1990s NBC version has not been seen since its cancellation.
- The 2003 NBC prime time version only aired three of the five episodes produced, with no rebroadcasts since.
- The current 2009 version classic episodes began airing in July 2022 on Paramount-owned Pluto TV and BET began airing vintage episodes.

== International versions ==
Rights were formerly held by RTL Group worldwide, but under current owners Marcus Lemonis and Nancy Glass, international rights are held by Can't Stop Media except for countries where it currently is produced by RTL. The show has been licensed to 22 countries.

Region or country	Local name	Host	Network	Dates
Algeria	حياتنا واحدة; Heyatna Wahda	Brahim Ghazali	Lina TV	2020
Australia	Let's Make a Deal	Mike Dyer; John Laws; Jimmy Hannan; Garry Meadows	Nine Network	1968–69; 1976–77
Australia	Let's Make a Deal	Vince Sorrenti	Network 10	1990–91
Brazil	Topa um Acordo?	Rodrigo Faro; Celso Portiolli	RecordTV; SBT	April 26, 2014 – December 2014; October 11, 2023 – present
Canada (Note: The 1980–81 Canadian version aired in both the U.S. and Canada.)	Let's Make a Deal	Monty Hall	Syndication	1980–81
Egypt	لعبة الحياة – ليتس ميك آي ديل; Lebet el hayat	Moutaz Al-Demirdash	Al Hayat 1	2013–present
Estonia	Kas lööme käed?	Robert Rool	Kanal 2	2023–present
France	Le Bigdil	Vincent Lagaf' and Bill	TF1	1998–2004
France	Le Bigdil	Vincent Lagaf' and Bill	RMC Story	January 2, 2025 – present
Germany	Geh aufs Ganze!	Jörg Draeger (1992–96; 1999–2003; 2021–22); Elmar Hörig (1996–98); Daniel Boschmann (2021–22)	Sat.1 (1992–97; 2021–22) tm3 (1997–98) kabel eins (1999–2003)	1992–2003; 2021–22
Greece	Το Μεγάλο Παζάρι; To Megalo Pazari	Andreas Mikroutsikos	Mega Channel	1991–95
Greece	Πάρ' τα Όλα; Parta Ola	Sakis Boulas	Skai TV	1997
Greece	Το πιο Μεγάλο Παζάρι; To pio Megalo Pazari	Andreas Mikroutsikos	Alpha TV	2006–07
Greece	Κάνε Παζάρι; Kane Pazari	Doretta Papadimitriou	Skai TV	2017
Greece	Το πιο Μεγάλο Παζάρι; To pio Megalo Pazari	Ilias Vrettos	Alpha TV	2023
Hungary	Zsákbamacska	György Rózsa	MTV 1	1994–95
Hungary	Zsákbamacska	György Rózsa, Majka and Joci Pápai (2023); Peti Marics, Brúnó Pető, Vajk Szente and T. Danny (2024)	TV2	2023–24
India	Khullja Sim Sim	Aman Verma; Hussain Kuwajerwala	StarPlus; Big Magic	2001–04; 2012–13
Indonesia	Super Deal 2 Milyar	Nico Siahaan	ANTV	2006–07
Indonesia	Super Deal 2 Milyar	Aditya Herpavi	ANTV	April 29, 2010 – December 31, 2010
Indonesia	Super Deal 2 Milyar	Indra Bekti and Indy Barends	ANTV	July 25, 2011 – November 21, 2011
Indonesia	Super Deal	Uya Kuya	ANTV	2014–15
Indonesia	Super Deal	Raffi Ahmad and Ruben Onsu	ANTV	2016
Indonesia	Super Deal	Irfan Hakim	MNCTV	2025–26
Indonesia	Super Deal Indonesia	Ananda Omesh, Andhika Pratama, Edric Tjandra and Papham	GTV	2018–20
Indonesia	Super Deal Indonesia	Andhika Pratama, Edric Tjandra, Gilang Gombloh, Erick Estrada, Rina Nose and Mimin Eva	GTV	2022–25
Israel	עשינו עסק; Asinu eseq	Avri Gilad (1994–95); Zvika Hadar (1996)	Channel 2	1994–96
Italy	Facciamo un affare	Walter Chiari; Iva Zanicchi	Telemontecarlo; Canale 5	1980; 1985–86
Lebanon	قصة كبيرة; Ossa kbireh	Michel Kazi	Future TV	2002
Mexico	Trato Hecho	Mauricio Barcelata	TV Azteca	1999
Peru	Haga negocio conmigo	Julio Colima; Humberto Martínez Morosini	Panamericana Televisión	1964–65
Peru	Haga negocio con Kiko	Kiko Ledgard	Panamericana Televisión	1965–70
Poland	Idź na całość	Zygmunt Chajzer (1997–2000); Krzysztof Tyniec (2000–01)	Polsat	1997–2001
Poland	Idź na całość	Zygmunt Chajzer and Robert Motyka	TTV	2025–present
Portugal	Negócio Fechado	Henrique Mendes	SIC	1999–2000
Portugal	Vai ou Racha	Pedro Teixeira	TVI	2023–26
Romania	Batem palma!	Dan Negru	Antena 1	2002–03
Spain	Fem Un Pacte	Joan Monleón	Canal Nou	1996
Spain	Trato Hecho	Bertín Osborne	Antena 3	1998–2000; 2002
Spain	¿Hay Trato?	Carlos Sobera	Antena 3	2004
Turkey	Seç Bakalım	Erhan Yazıcıoğlu	Kanal 6 ATV	1992–95; 1995–98
United Kingdom	Trick or Treat	Mike Smith and Julian Clary	ITV	1989
United States	Let's Make a Deal	Monty Hall	NBC	1963–67
United States	Let's Make a Deal	Monty Hall	ABC	Daytime 1968–76; Primetime 1969–71
United States	Let's Make a Deal	Monty Hall	Syndication	1971–77
United States	Let's Make a Deal	Monty Hall	Syndication	1980–81*
United States	The All-New Let's Make a Deal	Monty Hall	Syndication	1984–86
United States	Let's Make a Deal	Bob Hilton	NBC	1990–91
United States	Big Deal	Mark DeCarlo	FOX	1996
United States	Let's Make a Deal	Billy Bush	NBC	2003
United States	Let's Make a Deal	Wayne Brady	CBS	2009–present
United States (in Spanish)	Trato Hecho	Guillermo Huesca	Univision	January 10, 2005 – December 9, 2005
Vietnam	Ô cửa bí mật	Trần Hồng Ngọc	VTV3	January 6, 2008 – February 19, 2012

== Merchandise ==
In 1964, Milton Bradley released a home version of Let's Make a Deal featuring gameplay somewhat different from the television show. In 1974, Ideal Toys released an updated version of the game featuring Hall on the box cover, which was also given to all traders on the syndicated version in the 1974–75 season. An electronic tabletop version by Tiger Electronics was released in 1998. In the late summer of 2006, an interactive DVD version of Let's Make a Deal was released by Imagination Games, which also features classic clips from the Monty Hall years of the show. In 2010, Pressman Toy Corporation released an updated version of the box game, with gameplay more similar to the 1974 version, featuring Brady on the box cover.

Various U.S. lotteries have included instant lottery tickets based on Let's Make a Deal.

In 1999, the website BuyBidWin.com licensed the rights to Let's Make a Deal as it launched a website featuring Monty Hall.

In 1999, Shuffle Master teamed up with Bally's to do a video slot machine game based on the show with the voice and likeness of Monty Hall.

In 2004, IGT (International Gaming Technology) did a new video slot game based on the show still featuring Monty Hall. In 2023, another version of the video slots featuring Wayne Brady was released at Yaamava' Resort & Casino in Highland, California.

In 2004, the now defunct website GameShow24.com was going to release a beta game based on Let's Make a Deal.

In 2012, a Facebook game based on the Wayne Brady version was released by RealNetwork's GameHouse.

In 2013, Aristocrat Technologies did an all-new video slot machine game based on the Wayne Brady version.

In 2024, between October 1–24, the social casino game company Slotomania sponsored "The Big Deal of the Day" rounds during the show.

== Monty Hall problem ==
The Monty Hall problem, also called the Monty Hall paradox, is a famous question in probability theory presented as a hypothetical game on the show. In this game, a trader is allowed to choose among three doors that conceal a true prize and two zonks. After this choice is made, the host opens a door that was not chosen and reveals a zonk, and then offers to trade the trader's original choice for the item behind the other unopened door. The problem is to determine whether taking the trade improves the trader's chance of winning. The correct answer is that it does, although people often reach the opposite conclusion through faulty reasoning.

In an interview with The New York Times reporter John Tierney in 1991, Hall confirmed that when the host behaves strictly according to the problem description, it is advantageous for the trader to take the trade. Yet as host on the show, he could decide which trades to offer based on the traders' prior choices, which allowed him to play on them psychologically and control the number of wins.
