= Peter Tomarken =

American television personality (1942–2006)

- Tomarken in a 1983 publicity photo for the game show Press Your Luck
- Born: Peter David Tomarken; December 7, 1942; Olean, New York, US
- Died: March 13, 2006 (aged 63); Santa Monica, California, US
- Resting place: Hillside Memorial Park Cemetery
- Occupation: Television personality

Peter David Tomarken (December 7, 1942 – March 13, 2006) was an American television personality primarily known as the host of the game show Press Your Luck.

== Early life ==
Tomarken was born in Olean, New York, the middle son of Barnett and Pearl Tomarken, who owned Dee's Jewelry store in Olean. His family was Jewish, members of Temple B'nai Israel. They relocated to Beverly Hills, California, in the early 1950s. Peter graduated from Beverly Hills High School in 1960 and from UCLA with a bachelor's degree in English. Before hosting game shows, he appeared as a contestant on The Rebus Game in the 1960s.

After graduating from college, Tomarken married his first wife, Dana, who later served on the Beverly Hills Board of Education from 1985 to 1993. He and Dana had three children: Jason, and fraternal twin sisters, Alexis and Candace.

Tomarken worked on the magazines Women's Wear Daily and Business Week in New York City during the late 1960s before moving back to California to work at various advertising agencies. He made an appearance as a reporter in the 1978 film Heaven Can Wait, as well as the character Roe in "The Secret Empire" portion of the short lived NBC series Cliffhangers.

== Game show career ==
He later started his own advertising firm, which put him behind and in front of the camera for many commercials in the late 1970s. His agent then suggested that he should try his hand at game-show hosting, to which Tomarken replied, "Why would I want to do that?" His agent said, "Because you work four days a month and get paid six figures!" After a pair of failed pilots for NBC—Rodeo Drive in October 1980 (later picked as a series for Lifetime in 1990, ten years later) and Duel in the Daytime in August 1981, both produced by Jay Wolpert—Tomarken got his first network job of another Wolpert production as the host of Hit Man for NBC; it lasted just 13 weeks, from January 3 to April 1, 1983. He also co-anchored a newsmagazine show on Playboy TV called Playboy on the Scene. Later that year, Bill Carruthers hired Tomarken to host Press Your Luck, a revival of his 1977 daytime game show Second Chance, originally hosted by Jim Peck on ABC. Tomarken hosted for three seasons on CBS until its cancellation in 1986. In addition to hosting, Tomarken also co-produced and co-wrote the 1984 NBC special Those Wonderful TV Game Shows.

Tomarken then hosted the pilot for Wordplay in October 1986 with announcer Rod Roddy, but Tom Kennedy hosted and Charlie O'Donnell announced the series. Next he hosted the short-lived Bargain Hunters for ABC during the summer of 1987. After a year hiatus, he returned to host Wipeout (which he also produced), which ran in syndication for one season (1988–89).

Tomarken's next project was a pilot for a game-show adaptation of the board game Monopoly, which was produced by Merv Griffin and intended to air daily in syndication. Tomarken (and stations) balked at the use of a midget (Patty Maloney) to portray "Rich Uncle Pennybags", making it impossible to sell. The project was reworked into a summer replacement weekly series for ABC in 1990; Tomarken was replaced by Mike Reilly, a contestant on the pilot, and "Rich Uncle Pennybags" was removed. He hosted several other unsold pilots, including TKO for Mark Goodson, Two Heads Are Better Than One and Live Wire for Press Your Luck producer Bill Carruthers, Winds of Fortune, and Show Me the World before the game show market stalled in the early 1990s.

Tomarken then turned to working behind the scenes as a producer and writer. He joined the staff of ABC's America's Funniest People as a segment producer for one season in 1991. He also wrote and produced episodes for Real Stories of the Highway Patrol. He returned to the game-show arena in 1994 when he was hired by the fledgling GSN during its conception and early years in the mid-to-late 1990s, and served as host for their evening interactive telephone games, Prime Games, which featured Decades and Race for the Numbers. In 2000, Tomarken took his final hosting position on the Fox Family Channel game show Paranoia. He also appeared on several infomercials and acted in small roles, including on the TV show Ally McBeal, during that time. He semi-retired from television to work as a real estate agent.

When GSN decided to revive Tomarken's most successful series as Whammy! The All-New Press Your Luck, Tomarken taped a pilot episode. Todd Newton (who also hosted a pilot) was eventually selected to host the revival, which lasted for two seasons.

In 2003, Tomarken returned to GSN to participate in a documentary based on Michael Larson's run on Press Your Luck in 1984. He narrated the program, titled Big Bucks: The Press Your Luck Scandal, and also gave his own take on the event. As part of the special, he hosted a segment of Whammy! The All-New Press Your Luck (making a surprise appearance to host the question round) which reunited the two contestants who competed against Michael Larson with Larson's brother, James, for a grudge match; James won, with a total of $6,695. (Michael Larson had died in February 1999 of throat cancer.)

== Death ==
Tomarken—a private pilot—and his second wife, Kathleen (born June 12, 1964), were killed when his Beechcraft Bonanza A36, N16JR, crashed a few hundred feet offshore in Santa Monica Bay during climb-out from the Santa Monica Airport in California on the morning of March 13, 2006. The aircraft lost power shortly after takeoff and Tomarken attempted to turn back to the airport before crashing into the bay. The National Transportation Safety Board determined that the Tomarkens' chances of survival "would have significantly increased" had the plane been equipped with shoulder harnesses in addition to lap seat belts. The cause of the crash was determined to be an improper repair to the aircraft engine that resulted in a complete loss of power.

The Tomarkens were volunteers with Angel Flight West, a nonprofit organization that provides free air transportation to needy medical patients. They were en route to San Diego to pick up a cancer patient who needed transportation to UCLA Medical Center for treatment when their airplane crashed. The charity and the Tomarken children have since established a "Tomarken Heroes" fund in memory of the couple.

Tomarken and his wife are buried in the same plot at Hillside Memorial Park Cemetery in Culver City, California.

== In popular culture ==
Tomarken is portrayed by actor Walton Goggins in The Luckiest Man in America, a 2024 film dramatizing the events of Larson's run.
