= The Luckiest Man in America =

2024 film by Samir Oliveros

- Theatrical release poster
- Directed by: Samir Oliveros
- Written by: Maggie Briggs; Samir Oliveros
- Produced by: Amanda Freedman
- Starring: Paul Walter Hauser; Walton Goggins; Shamier Anderson; David Strathairn; Maisie Williams; Patti Harrison; Brian Geraghty; Haley Bennett; Johnny Knoxville; David Rysdahl
- Cinematography: Pablo Lozano
- Edited by: Sebastián Hernández
- Music by: John Carroll Kirby
- Production companies: Plenty Good; Fábula
- Distributed by: IFC Films; Sapan Studio
- Release dates: September 5, 2024 (TIFF); April 4, 2025 (United States)
- Running time: 90 minutes
- Country: United States
- Language: English
- Box office: $439,143

The Luckiest Man in America is a 2024 American drama film directed and co-written by Samir Oliveros. It stars Paul Walter Hauser, Walton Goggins, Shamier Anderson, Brian Geraghty, Patti Harrison, Haley Bennett, Damian Young, Lilli Kay, James Wolk, Shaunette Renée Wilson, David Rysdahl, Ricky Russert, David Strathairn, Johnny Knoxville, and Maisie Williams. It presents a semi-fictionalized (Note: Per a disclaimer at the beginning of the film) account of Michael Larson's 1984 appearance on Press Your Luck, during which he used his memorization of the gameboard's patterns to win record sums of money and prizes.

The film's world premiere was at the Toronto International Film Festival on September 5, 2024. It was released in the United States on April 4, 2025.

== Plot ==
In 1984, down-on-his-luck ice cream truck driver Michael Larson slips into an audition for the game show Press Your Luck when another contestant is late for his appointment. Larson explains his background to the interviewers, contestant coordinator Chuck and executive producer Bill Carruthers, but is removed from the office when the real contestant arrives. Carruthers, however, likes Larson's potential as an underdog and books him on the next day's taping.

The next day, Larson is slated to compete against returning champion Ed, a minister, and fellow challenger Janie, a dental assistant. He struggles early with providing correct answers to the trivia questions posed by host Peter Tomarken, but manages to gain spins on the show's gameboard, where he collects some winnings before spinning and landing on a Whammy, reducing his score to $0. As the last-place player, Larson plays first in the second round and soon passes $16,000 by continually spinning squares that award him both money and additional spins.

Carruthers and his staff become increasingly suspicious as Larson keeps amassing money and continuing to play in defiance of the odds. Chuck, searching for evidence Larson may be cheating, breaks into his ice cream truck, where he finds Larson's collection of driver's licenses, license plates, and videotapes. When he views the videotapes, which initially appear to be home movies, Chuck discovers Larson's extensive recording of past Press Your Luck episodes. With this knowledge, Chuck notices Larson's eyes carefully following the path of the light around the board and that Larson calculates the results of his spins so quickly it seems he already knows what he will spin, leading Chuck to realize Larson has memorized the five patterns the seemingly random gameboard uses.

Desperate to stop Larson, Carruthers and the others attempt to break his concentration through increasingly intrusive means. Eventually, however, they realize that Larson's success can be used to promote the show and decide to allow him to win. At over $109,000 and with only one spin left, Larson is caught by surprise when his estranged wife Patricia, whom he had tried to call several times during breaks in the taping, is brought into a phone call to the show orchestrated by Chuck. When Patricia asks Larson to sign their divorce papers and hangs up, he suffers an emotional breakdown, flees the set, and locks himself in a dressing room. Ed, feeling sympathy for Larson, tries to speak with him until Carruthers arrives. Carruthers tells Larson that he knows Larson memorized the patterns, but adds that he is becoming a star and will be beloved by the audience once he completes his victory.

Larson, reassured, returns to the set, where the audience has begun chanting for him. As the game resumes, Larson chooses to pass his remaining spin to Ed in defiance of Carruthers' expectations, earning a standing ovation from the crowd. Ed hits a Whammy, losing all of his winnings, and Janie takes several spins before passing one final spin back to Larson. Tired and unable to see his patterns anymore, Larson closes his eyes and hits the button to stop the board.

Several weeks later, Patricia watches the broadcast of Larson's appearance; he survived his final spin by landing on a prize and ultimately won cash and prizes totaling $110,237. Per Larson's agreement with Carruthers, his accomplishment earns him the title of "Luckiest Man in America."

== Cast ==
- Paul Walter Hauser as Michael Larson
- Walton Goggins as Peter Tomarken
- David Strathairn as Bill Carruthers
- Maisie Williams as Sylvia
- Shamier Anderson as Chuck
- Brian Geraghty as Ed
- Patti Harrison as Janie
- Haley Bennett as Patricia
- Damian Young as Kauffman
- Lilli Kay as Lisa
- James Wolk as Junior
- Shaunette Renée Wilson as Donna
- David Rysdahl as Todd
- Ricky Russert as Whitman
- Johnny Knoxville as Leon Hart
- Chris Nichter as Rod Roddy (voice)

A clip of the real-life Press Your Luck episode with Larson being interviewed by Tomarken is featured as the film's mid-credits scene, with the real-life Ed and Janie briefly appearing as well.

== Production ==
On August 18, 2000, the film was originally announced as a comedy with Bill Murray portraying the role of Larson with Howard Franklin as writer and director along with Nicolas Cage's Saturn Films and Stanley Books' Once Upon a Time Films producing. However, the plans were scrapped later on in its lifespan, and it was placed in development hell for 25 years.

It was announced in May 2024 that the film, titled Press Your Luck, had entered post-production, with Paul Walter Hauser, Walton Goggins, David Strathairn, and Maisie Williams among the cast announced. Later, the film was retitled The Luckiest Man in America. It was filmed primarily on soundstages in Bogotá, Colombia (the hometown of the film's director, Samir Oliveros).

== Release ==
The film premiered at the Toronto International Film Festival on September 5, 2024. That same month, IFC Films and Sapan Studio acquired U.S. distribution rights to the film, planning to theatrically release it sometime in 2025. It was released in the United States on April 4, 2025.

== Reception ==
On the review aggregator website Rotten Tomatoes, 67% of 78 critics' reviews are positive, with an average rating of 6.3/10. The website's consensus reads: "If The Luckiest Man in America doesn't fully deliver on the potential of its sensational true story, it fortunately has Paul Walter Hauser on hand to provide some welcome emotional complexity." Metacritic, which uses a weighted average, assigned the film a score of 68 out of 100, based on 12 critics, indicating "generally favorable" reviews.

Matt Zoller Seitz of RogerEbert.com gave the film three out of four stars and wrote, "The Luckiest Man in America is good follow-up viewing for Quiz Show, a drama about the 1950s quiz show scandals that prompted congressional investigations and led to reforms in the television industry. It's also an example of how to make a low-budget movie that immerses you in a long-gone world and the minds of people who lived in it, while maintaining a tight geographical focus on a small number of characters." Christian Carrion of BuzzerBlog, a news website exclusively covering game shows, panned the film, saying, "While the film was fun enough, the episodes of the show themselves, as well as the companion GSN documentary, are still the definitive method of experiencing this tale."
