= Bargain Hunters =

American television game show

- Genre: Game show
- Created by: Merrill Heatter
- Directed by: Jerome Shaw
- Presented by: Peter Tomarken
- Announcer: Dean Goss
- Music by: Score Productions
- Country of origin: United States
- Original language: English
- No. of seasons: 1
- No. of episodes: 36

Production
- Producers: Art Alisi, Steve Friedman, Paul Gilbert
- Production locations: Hollywood Center Studios, Los Angeles, California
- Running time: approx. 22-26 minutes
- Production companies: Merrill Heatter Productions, Josephenson Communications

Original release
- Network: ABC
- Release: July 6 – September 4, 1987

Bargain Hunters is an American television game show. Contestants compete in a variety of games involving bargains, or reduced prices on merchandise; it also combines elements of home shopping by offering products for sale to home viewers. Created by Merrill Heatter, the show was hosted by Peter Tomarken and had Dean Goss as announcer. It debuted July 6, 1987, on American Broadcasting Company (ABC). The show received generally negative critical reception and low ratings, and was canceled in September 1987.

== Format ==
Bargain Hunters combines elements of a game show and home shopping. Six contestants compete throughout, two each in three different games where they attempt to determine whether the value of an item is a "bargain", or reduced from its actual retail price. The winner of each game proceeds to the show's final round, known as the Super Savers Round.

In the first round, known as the Bargain Quiz, the host asks trivia questions about the value of an item, such as "If you had bought one of the original Cabbage Patch Kids dolls in 1983, would you have gotten a bargain at $48?" Answering the question correctly awards a point, while answering incorrectly awards a point to the opponent. The first contestant to reach three points wins a prize which is presented at the start of the round.

Two new contestants are selected for the second round, the Bargain Trap. Five prizes are shown, four of which are marked below their retail prices, while the fifth has been marked up as the "trap." The contestants alternate choosing one prize at a time, trying to avoid the trap; if either contestant chooses it, they immediately lose the round. If the contestants choose all four marked-down prizes, they must write down their guesses at the amount by which the trap is overpriced, and the one who comes closer wins the round and receives that prize. The winner of this round keeps all prizes they have chosen. If the trap is found on the first pick of the round, the opponent wins it.

For the third round, Bargain Busters, a third pair of contestants is shown a prize and a choice of three different prices, of which only one is the actual value. The contestants then secretly and separately lock in their guesses, scoring one point for choosing the correct price. Three prizes are played in this manner, and the contestant in the lead after the third prize wins the round and receives all of them. If the score is tied at the end of the round, a fourth prize is presented with no price choices; the contestants write down their guesses, and the one who comes closer wins the round and all four prizes. In between each of the first three rounds, merchandise from each round is presented for sale at reduced price to home viewers, who may call a toll-free number to purchase the items.

The winners of the three rounds advance to the final Super Savers Round. Seven prizes are presented, each marked down from its retail price, and each contestant secretly chooses the three whose combined markdown they believe is the highest. The markdown amounts are then revealed and totaled for each contestant. The one who has saved the most money wins both the day's grand prize and the three prizes they have chosen. If the round ends in a tie, the contestants reveal their guesses at the total markdown of all seven prizes and the one who comes closest to the actual total is the winner.

== Development ==
Bargain Hunters was created by Merrill Heatter for Merrill Heatter Productions. The show recorded its episodes at Hollywood Center Studios (now known as Sunset Las Palmas Studios) in Los Angeles, California. The show's host was Peter Tomarken, also known for Hit Man and Press Your Luck. Dean Goss was the announcer, Jerome Shaw served as director, and Score Productions composed the music. The show aired from July 6, 1987 to September 4, 1987, on American Broadcasting Company (ABC).

According to David Baber in Television Game Show Hosts: Biographies of 32 Stars, Tomarken recalled that test audiences reacted positively to his hosting but negatively to the show's format. Additionally, Tomarken noted that, unlike other game shows at the time, Bargain Hunters did not require potential contestants to take a test or play a practice game first. During its tenure, Bargain Hunters was the lowest-rated daytime program on network television. As a result of its low ratings, ABC canceled it in September 1987 and replaced it with Home. Columnist Gary Deeb attributed the show's failure to the "fad" of home shopping becoming less popular over time.

== Reception ==
In an article for United Press International, Mark Schwed was highly unfavorable toward several facets of the show's concept and described it as having "all the most irritating traits of game shows". Schwed perceived the show's merchandise as "nothing but junk", was critical of Tomarken's hosting and Goss's announcing, and also criticized the nature of the trivia questions in the show's first round. He also called the format "a bad imitation of others in the genre." Rick Bentley of The Town Talk was also negative toward the show's format, calling it a "thinly-veiled 30-minute commercial" and considering its gameplay derivative of The Price Is Right. Lynn Hoogenboom, in a column reprinted in Citizens' Voice, also observed that the show's structure had similarities to The Price Is Right, but also thought that the show's central focus on "bargains" gave it potential. The San Francisco Examiner writer Joyce Millman shared a similar opinion, and called the combination of formats "crafty".
