= The Prospect Studios =

Television studio in Los Angeles, United States

Coordinates: 34°06′08″N 118°16′58″W

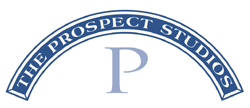

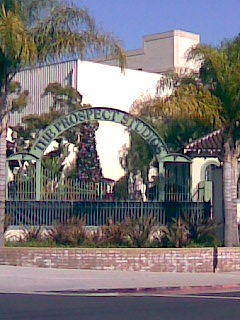
- Interactive map of the The Prospect Studios area
- Former names: The Vitagraph Studio; The Warner East Hollywood Annex
- Alternative names: ABC Television Center [West]

General information
- Location: 4151 Prospect Avenue, Los Angeles, California, United States
- Inaugurated: 1913; 113 years ago
- Owner: The Walt Disney Company

Website
- Official website

The Prospect Studios (also known as ABC Television Center [West]) is a lot containing several television studios located at 4151 Prospect Avenue in the Los Feliz neighborhood of Los Angeles, at the corner of Prospect and Talmadge Street (named in honor of silent screen star Norma Talmadge), just east of Hollywood.

For over fifty years, this facility served as the home to ABC's West Coast headquarters before the network moved its main headquarters to Walt Disney Studios in 1996. After being there since 1949, ABC's Los Angeles station KABC-TV moved to a new state-of-the-art facility located on a portion of Disney's Grand Central Creative Campus (GC3) in nearby Glendale, California, in December 1999.

Having acquired ABC's parent company in the mid-1990s, The Walt Disney Company continues to own and operate the facility to this day.

== History ==
Elizabeth Vargas anchors ABC World News Tonight from ABC News' Los Angeles Bureau, located at The Prospect Studios until 2011.

In 1911, the Vitagraph West Coast studio was established at the beach, at William Rapp's Los Angeles Beer Garden (1875), at 1438 2nd Street, in Santa Monica, but subjected to persistent fog which made filming so difficult that they moved.

In 1913, the Vitagraph Studio at 4151 Prospect Avenue and Talmadge Street opened, replacing the prior Santa Monica site. Originally, the silent film plant included two daylight film stages, support buildings and many exterior film sets. The company added another 10 acres to the lot in 1920. In the 1920s, production was moved from its East Coast studio.

In April 1925, one of Vitagraph's founders, Albert Smith, sold control in the company to the Warner Brothers. In 1927, the facility became The Warner East Hollywood Annex and was used for many large-scale films. Here, in 1927, Warner Bros. shot portions of The Jazz Singer, the first film with synchronised sound, using the Vitaphone process. The "interior" club scenes for the film were shot in Stage 5, still located today in the center of the Studio Lot. In the 1930s and '40s, Warner Bros. continued to shoot on the Lot using large water tanks, ship and backlot sets.

In 1948, the property was sold to the newly formed American Broadcasting Company, and the lot was re-equipped for television as the ABC Television Center. ABC proceeded to base their new Los Angeles television station, KECA-TV (now KABC-TV) in the newly purchased lot, a year later. Construction on the studio lot to bring it to its current form took place in 1957. ABC still uses the Prospect facility as a network retransmission center for its programming. Many memorable television shows, including those produced for ABC, other networks or syndication, have been produced in the studios. The third JFK/Nixon debate was partially held in this studio on October 13, 1960, with Kennedy in a New York studio, while Nixon and the interviewing panel were based at the Prospect lot, albeit in separate studios to insure fairness between the candidates. American Bandstand started recording there in 1964 (moving from Philadelphia). ABC's longest running program, General Hospital, now in its 59th year on the air, has been taped at this location since the mid-1980s after relocating from the Sunset Gower Studios in Hollywood. Many other classic television shows were also produced there including The Lawrence Welk Show, Barney Miller, Fridays, Mr. Belvedere, Welcome Back, Kotter, Benson, and Soap. Barney Miller, Benson and Soap were also shot at Sunset Gower Studios.

Four of the most well-known game shows in television history were recorded at ABC Television Center: Family Feud (1976–85, hosted by Richard Dawson), Let's Make a Deal (1968–76, hosted by Monty Hall), The Dating Game (1965–74, hosted by Jim Lange), and The Newlywed Game (1966–74, hosted by Bob Eubanks). Other game shows taped there included The Better Sex (1977–78, hosted by Bill Anderson and Sarah Purcell), Break the Bank (1976–77, hosted by Tom Kennedy for the daytime and Jack Barry for syndication), Match Game (1990–91, hosted by Ross Shafer), Password and Password All-Stars (1971–75, both hosted by Allen Ludden).

John Davidson, along with Pro Football Hall of Fame quarterback Fran Tarkenton and Cathy Lee Crosby co-hosted That's Incredible!, an ABC show that ran from 1980 to 1984, and considered one of the first true shows of the reality television genre. ABC's long-running show, America's Funniest Home Videos, taped here from 1990 to 1993 during the era of Bob Saget.

The Los Angeles Bureau of ABC News was also located at The Prospect Studios until it was moved to the KABC-TV studios in Glendale in 2011. The facility also served as broadcast headquarters for ABC's coverage of the 1984 Los Angeles Summer Olympic Games.

In 1996, ABC became part of The Walt Disney Co. As the television and film industry entered the next millennium, the lot by 2002 was renamed The Prospect Studios. In 2002, the property underwent a major renovation to position its facilities for the future and new technical innovation.

Current shows besides General Hospital produced here include ABC's medical drama Grey's Anatomy.

== Films produced at the studio ==
- Captain Blood (1935)
- The Jazz Singer (1927)
- Sea Hawk (1940)
- Noah's Ark (1928)

== Shows produced at the studio ==
- 1984 Summer Olympic Games
- ABC World News Tonight (periodically anchored out of Los Angeles; segments also produced here)
- All-Star Blitz (1985)
- Amanda's
- American Bandstand (1957-1987)
- America's Funniest Home Videos (1990–1993, 1996–1997)
- America's Funniest People (1990–1992)
- Animal Crack-Ups (1987–90)
- American Journal (1993–94)
- AM Los Angeles (shown locally on KABC-TV)
- Bargain Hunters
- Barney Miller
- Benson
- The Better Sex
- Break the Bank (1976 on ABC Daytime; 1976–77, syndicated nighttime version)
- Bruce Forsyth's Hot Streak (1986)
- The Dating Game (1965–73)
- The Dick Cavett Show
- Dick Clark's New Year's Rockin' Eve (musical performances)
- Diff'rent Strokes (final season, 1985–86)
- Dolly (1987-1988)
- Double Talk (1986)
- The Ernie Kovacs Show
- Eyewitness News (KABC-TV edition)
- Family Feud (1976–1985)
- Faerie Tale Theatre (1982 - 1985)
- Fridays
- General Hospital (1963–present)
- Grey's Anatomy (2005–present)
- Hail to the Chief
- High Rollers (1986 pilot only)
- Hot Seat
- It's a Living (1st 2 seasons only)
- It's Garry Shandling's Show (first two seasons)
- The Krypton Factor (1981 US Version)
- Let's Make a Deal (1968–76 seasons)
- The Lawrence Welk Show (some seasons; others were at the Hollywood Palladium)
- Live with Regis and Kelly (a week of shows in Los Angeles, March 2007)
- Love Connection (1984–87)
- Married... with Children (Seasons 1 and 2 episodes only)
- Match Game (1990–1991)
- Moesha (season 1 only)
- Mr. Belvedere (1985–1990)
- The New Treasure Hunt (1973–74)
- The Newlywed Game (1966–74)
- Night Court (1984)
- Off the Rack (1985 sitcom)
- The Oprah Winfrey Show (periodic West Coast shows)
- Password (1971–75)
- Port Charles
- Rhyme and Reason
- Robotica (TV series) 3 seasons (2001-2002)
- Run for the Money (1987 pilot produced by Reg Grundy Productions; later became Going for Gold in Great Britain)
- Second Chance
- The Shield (2006)
- Seven Keys with Jack Narz (1960–65)
- Showoffs (1975)
- Sister Kate (TV Series) (1989–90)
- Soap
- Soap Talk
- The Sonny and Cher Show (1976–1977)
- Space Patrol (1950–1955)
- Split Second (1972–75)
- That's Incredible!
- That's My Mama (some Season 1 episodes taped at CBS Television City)
- Three's a Crowd
- Three's Company (Some of 1st season)
- Trivia Trap
- The View (periodic West Coast shows)
- Welcome Back, Kotter
- We Got It Made (1987-88 syndicated version)
- What's Happening!!
- You Asked for It
