= Hitman (British game show) =

- Genre: Game show
- Created by: Jay Wolpert
- Presented by: Nick Owen
- Theme music composer: Ed Welch
- Country of origin: United Kingdom
- Original language: English
- No. of series: 1
- No. of episodes: 14

Production
- Production location: The Maidstone Studios
- Running time: 30 minutes
- Production company: TVS in association with Action Time

Original release
- Network: ITV
- Release: 28 February – 30 May 1989

Related
- US version

Hitman is a British game show that aired on ITV from 28 February to 30 May 1989 and was hosted by Nick Owen. The programme was based on the US version, which aired on NBC in 1983 and was hosted by Peter Tomarken.

== Gameplay ==
In the first round, three players watched a film clip and then answered a series of questions about it. Each correct answer earned a "hitman" for the player who gave it. The first two players to earn five hitmen advanced to the next round; the third was eliminated and given a consolation prize consisting of champagne and caviar.

For the second round, each of the remaining two players was given an army of hitmen to defend. The first player who qualified for the round received nine hitmen, while the second player received eight. They watched a new film clip and answered questions about it, with each correct answer eliminating one of the opponent's hitmen. The contestant loses one hitman if they get their question wrong. The first player to wipe out all of his/her opponent's hitmen won the game and advanced to the final round for a chance to win up to £3,000.

In this round, the winner stood facing away from a board with eight columns, each of which contained a random number of hitmen from one to five, and had 60 seconds to clear up to three of them. He/she chose a column and tried to clear it out by answering questions on both of the film clips in the earlier rounds, earning £1,000 per column cleared. A wrong answer meant that the player had to abandon the current column and choose a new one. Completing three columns awarded the top prize of £3,000.

At the time of the show's broadcast, £3,000 was the maximum allowable cash prize on a game show in the United Kingdom. The first winner of this top prize, Paul Grimshaw from Wakefield, briefly held the UK record for the highest cash winnings on a game show.

== Transmissions ==
The series had 14 episodes and ran between 28 February to 30 May on Tuesdays at 19.00. However, there were scheduling variations by some ITV companies:

- Thames moved the series to 19.30 from Tuesday 28 March.
- Anglia and Central scheduled the series on Wednesdays at 17.10 because they were broadcasting Emmerdale Farm on Tuesdays at 19.00.
- Scottish started the series on 28 February to 6 June at 19.30. The final episode was shown on Thursday 15 June at 19.30.
