= Ed Flesh =

American art director and designer (1931–2011)

- Born: Edwin Albert Flesh Jr. December 4, 1931; Philadelphia, Pennsylvania, U.S.
- Died: July 15, 2011 (aged 79); Los Angeles, California, U.S.
- Education: Franklin & Marshall College; Yale University
- Occupations: Art director, designer
- Partner: David Powers

Edwin Albert Flesh Jr. (December 4, 1931 – July 15, 2011), known as Ed Flesh, was an American art director and designer who worked on a variety of television programs from the 1950s through the 1990s. He is best known for designing the Wheel used in the game show Wheel of Fortune. In 1993, Flesh was nominated for a Daytime Emmy Award for his work on Supermarket Sweep. His other credits as a television art director include Pyramid, Days of Our Lives, Press Your Luck, Celebrity Sweepstakes, Second Chance, The New Newlywed Game, To Say the Least, Name That Tune and Jeopardy!.

Flesh was a native of Philadelphia, Pennsylvania, where he was born on December 4, 1931. He received his bachelor's degree from Franklin & Marshall College, located in Lancaster, Pennsylvania. Flesh then enrolled at Yale Drama School, where he studied graduate level scenic design for three years.

Flesh relocated to New York City after completing his studies at Yale. He worked as a scene designer for off-Broadway productions before being hired as the "supervisor of scenic design" for NBC. He transferred from New York to NBC Studios in Burbank, California, where he worked as the head art director for game shows, as well as the soap opera, Days of Our Lives.

Flesh is credited with conceiving and designing the wheel for NBC's Wheel of Fortune. Flesh designed the wheel to spin "horizontally instead of vertically", a design unlike most previous game show wheels.

Flesh later designed the sets for The Montel Williams Show and The David Letterman Show, a short-lived daytime show on NBC which aired in 1980. He also designed the sets for three special editions of The Oprah Winfrey Show, in which Oprah Winfrey interviewed John Travolta, Barbra Streisand and Madonna.

Ed Flesh, who lived in Sylmar, died on July 15, 2011, at Providence Holy Cross Medical Center in Mission Hills, California, at the age of 79. He was survived by his partner of 44 years, David Powers.
