= Jim Peck =

American television and radio personality

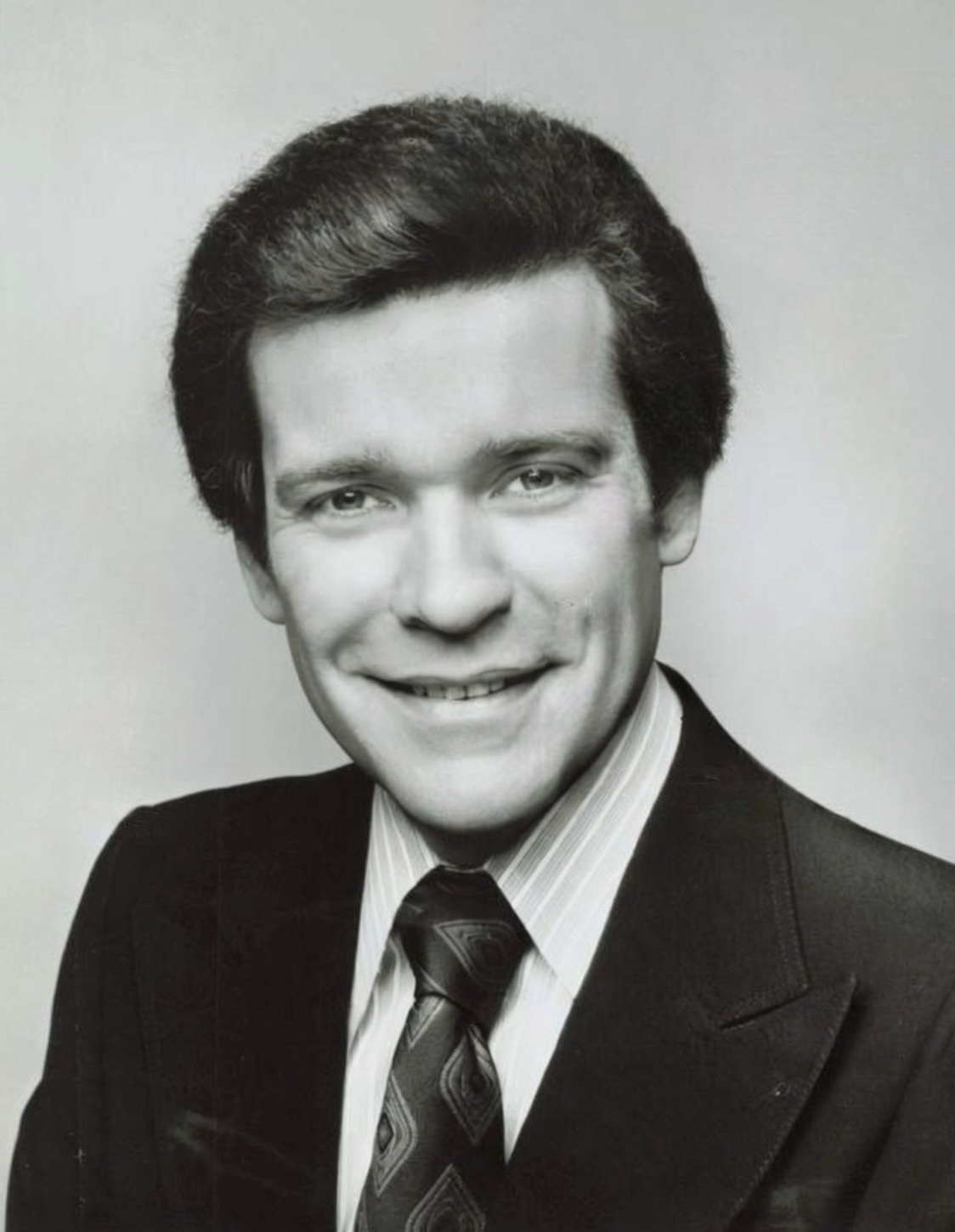
- Peck in Second Chance, 1977
- Born: James Edward Peck; April 16, 1939 (age 86); Milwaukee, Wisconsin, U.S.
- Occupations: Television and Radio personality
- Years active: 1974–1994

James Edward Peck (born April 16, 1939) is an American television and radio personality based in Milwaukee and is perhaps best known for his time as a game show host.

== Early career ==
After Peck graduated from Marquette University with a double major in English and Psychology in 1962, he worked as an admissions counselor for Marquette. While thinking about his career options, Peck became interested in broadcasting. He had dabbled in acting by appearing in several theatrical plays on campus during his college years and the idea of performing intrigued him.

In 1968 he joined the staff of WISN-TV in Milwaukee as a booth announcer doing station breaks and other announcing chores. In 1969, Peck moved to WVTV in Milwaukee, where he served as host of the talk show Confrontation from 1969 to 1971, and then hosted Jim Peck's Hotline for WTMJ-TV from 1971 to 1973. He moved to Washington, D.C. in 1973 to host the talk show Take It From Here for WRC-TV, where he remained for the next three years.

Ron Greenberg was developing the game show Showdown for ABC and hired Peck to host the pilot. Although ABC did not pick up the show, in 1974 Greenberg taped a second pilot and the show was retitled The Big Showdown. This time, ABC picked up the series and the show ran from December 23, 1974, until July 4, 1975. Peck continued hosting Take It From Here in Washington, D.C. during this time and commuted to New York City every three weeks to tape episodes for The Big Showdown.

Peck then hosted the unusual Hot Seat, a Merrill Heatter-Bob Quigley production which featured an oversized lie detector to measure a spouse's responses to personal questions. Hot Seat began airing on July 12, 1976, along with Family Feud, but was gone after 15 weeks and aired its final episode on October 22 of that year.

Shortly before the demise of Hot Seat, Peck had moved to Los Angeles and following the show's cancellation, ABC President Fred Silverman put him under exclusive contract with the network to host game shows and other projects. Peck also occasionally substituted for David Hartman on Good Morning America. In March 1977 he began to helm Second Chance, produced by Bill Carruthers and a precursor to Carruthers' Press Your Luck that premiered in 1983 and ran for three seasons. Peck's series wasn't as popular as its follow-up and after 19 weeks of episodes, Second Chance left the air on July 15, 1977. Peck has not hosted a network game show since.

== Later career ==
Peck began developing a late-night special for ABC called After Hours: The Jim Peck Special which he hosted and produced. The special was taped in the fall of 1977, but his contract with the network expired, and the special never aired. In the fall of 1978, Peck was called on to host a second revival of the 1960s classic word game You Don't Say! that Tom Kennedy had hosted. Suffering from low ratings and a lack of major market clearances, You Don't Say! did not last a full season, and its final episode aired in March 1979.

Afterward, Peck became host of the controversial Chuck Barris game show Three's a Crowd, which asked the question, "Who knows a man better, his wife or his secretary?" Three's a Crowd only lasted for 4 1/2 months (September 17, 1979 to February 1, 1980) due in part to both the low ratings the show pulled in and the backlash caused by the show's content.

Since then, Peck hasn't emceed game shows on a full-time basis. He hosted two game show pilots during the early 1980s that never made it to the air: Everything's Relative for ABC in 1980 and The TV Game in 1982 and hosted occasional infomercials. Beginning in 1981, however, he returned as a frequent substitute for Jack Barry on the syndicated quiz The Joker's Wild. Over the next three years, Peck gradually began appearing as often as Barry, who was in his mid-sixties at the time, was beginning to ease himself into retirement. Although Peck was not the popular choice among staffers at Barry & Enright Productions, Barry and producer Ron Greenberg continued to groom the frequent sub for the position. The plans were to have Peck take over the hosting position permanently at the beginning of the 1984-85 season, with Barry announcing his retirement on-air and handing the show over to his successor.

However, on May 2, 1984, Barry suddenly died of cardiac arrest in New York City shortly after filming for the seventh season of The Joker's Wild had concluded. Upon Barry's death, his partner Dan Enright took control of the production company and over Peck, hired Bill Cullen, who was finishing up his run as the host of another Barry & Enright-produced program, NBC's Hot Potato.

Except for several weeks of subbing for Cullen on The Joker's Wild during its final season (1985–86), and the unsold pilots The Buck Stops Here (taped in 1985 for Procter & Gamble Productions) and the 1990 Marty Pasetta pilot Suit Yourself, Peck moved away from game shows altogether; he went on to serve as the court reporter and announcer for a revival of Divorce Court from 1985 to 1989, when he was replaced by actress Martha Smith.

One of Peck's last jobs before leaving national television was as host of the annual Drum Corps International (DCI) competitions, which was seen on PBS.

== Current ==
In 1993, Peck moved to Spring Green, Wisconsin, where he rented a large farm and spent the next year in retirement. In 1994, he began working in public relations for his alma mater, Marquette University, as a fundraiser, and in February 1995 began hosting I Remember Milwaukee (later titled simply I Remember) on PBS station WMVS (Channel 10), a series revolving around the history of Wisconsin's largest city, as well as the Saturday edition of Wisconsin's Morning News on WTMJ-AM (620). I Remember aired its last episode on June 27, 2016.
