= Cover Story (TV program) =

- Genre: Documentary
- Country of origin: United States
- Original language: English
- No. of seasons: 1
- No. of episodes: 10

Production
- Producers: Game Show Enterprises, LLC

Original release
- Network: Game Show Network
- Release: January 14 – December 2, 2018

Cover Story is an American documentary television program broadcast by Game Show Network (GSN). The program premiered on January 14, 2018, airing episodes Sunday evenings for three weeks before disappearing from GSN's schedule. In March, the network announced that the series would return following what was considered a "successful debut." It returned on June 10, 2018.

== Episodes ==
No.	Title	Original release date	U.S. viewers (millions)
1	"The Press Your Luck Scandal"	January 14, 2018	0.583
Michael Larson's 1984 appearance on Press Your Luck is revisited, in which he memorized the patterns of the show's Big Board to win $110,237 in cash and prizes. Much of the footage featured in this episode was previously shown in the 2003 documentary "Big Bucks: The Press Your Luck Scandal.
2	"Meghan Markle: The Prince and the Game Show Model"	January 21, 2018	N/A (Note: Episode ranked outside of ShowBuzzDaily's top 150 cable originals for January 21, 2018.)
Former Deal or No Deal case model Meghan Markle's life and career are detailed as she prepares to marry Prince Harry of the British royal family. Larry King also makes an appearance comparing Markle to Princess Diana, having interviewed both women.
3	"The Notorious Lottery Heist"	January 28, 2018	0.415
Multi-state lottery head of IT Eddie Tipton turns $5 into a $16,500,000 lottery win, though the suspicious nature of the case prompts a nationwide investigation.
4	"Winning the Lottery: Cash or Crash"	June 10, 2018	0.324
Several multi-million dollar lottery winners detail their stories of success; financial advisors and pundits also discuss the challenges that come with winning these big prizes.
5	"All Access Pass: The Price Is Right"	June 17, 2018	N/A (Note: Episode ranked outside of ShowBuzzDaily's top 150 cable originals for June 17, 2018.)
For the first time ever, CBS' long-running game show, The Price Is Right, opens the doors of its prize warehouse to the public for a behind-the-scenes tour. Personnel from the show are also interviewed, such as host Drew Carey and executive producer Mike Richards.
6	"Game Show Super Contestants"	October 21, 2018	N/A
The incredible stories of contestants who won the largest prizes and had the most memorable wins on some of the most popular and beloved game shows are explored with never-before-seen interviews that dive into the effects of the winnings on their life, what they did with their huge prizes, and where they are now.
7	"The Newlywed Game Most Outrageous Answers"	October 28, 2018	N/A
Trish Suhr revisits the unforgettable couples, wild confessions, and the most outrageous and hilarious moments from the game show The Newlywed Game.
8	"Wheel of Fortune Greatest Moments"	November 4, 2018	N/A
Trish Suhr celebrates Wheel of Fortune's greatest moments featuring amazing solves, missteps, bloopers, and laugh-out-loud clips.
9	"Playing the Slots: Big Winners and Cheaters"	November 18, 2018	N/A
Those who won millions, those who thought they won big but didn't, and those who cheated detail their slot-playing stories. Also, slot machine designers and experts explain why most gamblers are really losing, even when they think they're winning, and how these thrilling machines are designed to stimulate gamblers' senses and keep them coming back and spending, time and time again.
10	"The MIT Blackjack Ring"	December 2, 2018	N/A
The story of the group of student gamblers at MIT who learned how to tilt the odds in their favor while playing blackjack, which led to big money and big trouble.
