= Paranoia (game show) =

- Genre: Game show
- Created by: Peter Usher
- Presented by: Peter Tomarken
- Country of origin: United States
- Original language: English
- No. of seasons: 1
- No. of episodes: 12

Production
- Running time: 60 minutes
- Production company: Triage Entertainment

Original release
- Network: Fox Family
- Release: April 14 – May 7, 2000

Paranoia is a game show that aired on the Fox Family channel from April to May 2000. The show was hosted by Peter Tomarken, and the first game show since the 1950s to be recorded live with contestants playing in the studio, by satellite, over the phone, and on the show's website.

== Gameplay ==
An in-studio contestant competed against three satellite players across the U.S. by answering a series of 10 multiple-choice questions, each with four answers. The studio contestant began the game with $10,000 in cash.

Before the studio contestant answered each question, the three satellite players picked their answers. If the studio contestant responded correctly, their total remained intact; if not, they lost $1,000. In either case, the studio contestant then had to challenge at least one satellite contestant. Each correct answer won $1,000 for that satellite contestant, paid out of the studio contestant's total, while a miss earned one strike. Satellite contestants were eliminated upon earning two strikes, and kept any money they had earned (or were paid $500, not deducted from the studio contestant's total, if they had earned none).

The studio contestant was given two cards, each of which could be used once: a "Swap Out" to replace one satellite contestant with an unknown alternate, at a cost of $1,000; and a "Knock Out" to eliminate one satellite contestant from the game, at a cost of $3,000. Near the end of the show's run, the money associated with using these cards was given to the affected satellite contestant. Any strikes earned by a swapped-out contestant carried over to the alternate.

Every game featured a $5,000 Interactive Jackpot, which was not affected by the studio or satellite contestants' performance. Five online players and five telephone players were chosen before each question at random; each correct answer won $50 for that player, deducted from the jackpot.

If the studio contestant ran out of money at any time or finished all 10 questions with at least one satellite player surviving, the game ended and they left with $500 as consolation. However, if the studio contestant eliminated all three satellite players, they won whatever money remained of both the original $10,000 cash and the Interactive Jackpot. The maximum front-game total was therefore $15,000.

In the event that the studio contestant lost the game, the surviving satellite player with the most money would get a chance to become a future studio contestant.

=== Bonus round ===
While connected to a heart monitor that broadcast their heartbeat to the studio audience, the studio contestant chose one of 10 categories and had 15 seconds to answer an open-ended question asked by Tomarken. A correct answer multiplied the front-game winnings by whatever number was hidden behind the category; nine of the categories hid the number 10, while the tenth hid 100. There was no penalty for a wrong answer. The maximum possible grand prize was $1.5 million.

=== Interactive game ===
As described above, five each of online and phone players were randomly chosen before each question and could win $50 for a correct answer. In addition, Tomarken asked two more interactive questions during the show, one to an online player and the other to a phone player (this could happen multiple times in one episode). A correct answer won a home computer and camera.

Near the end of an episode, the online players who reached the "Top 5" leaderboard would be shown onscreen and each person would also receive a home computer, a camera, and a chance to become a future satellite player.
