= Showoffs =

American television game show

- Presented by: Bobby Van
- Announcer: Gene Wood
- Theme music composer: Bob Israel
- Country of origin: United States
- No. of episodes: 129

Production
- Production locations: ABC Television Center; Hollywood, California
- Running time: 30 Minutes
- Production company: Mark Goodson-Bill Todman Productions

Original release
- Network: ABC
- Release: June 30 – December 26, 1975

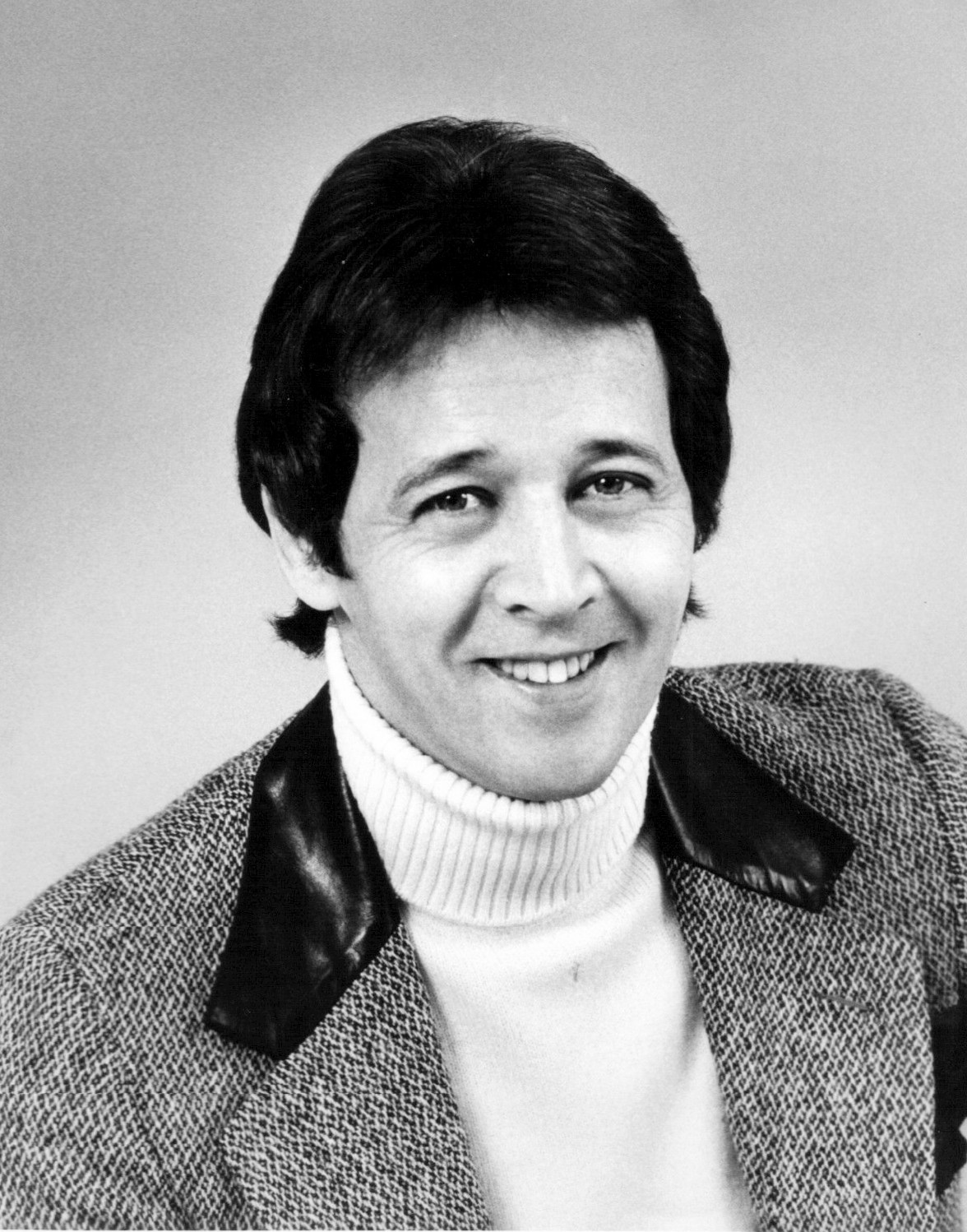
Host Bobby Van (1975)

Showoffs is an American television game show which ran on ABC from June 30 to December 26, 1975. Bobby Van hosted it, with Gene Wood as announcer. The Mark Goodson-Bill Todman production involved two teams competing in a game of charades.

== Gameplay ==
Two teams of three players competed. The teams were composed of two celebrity guests and one civilian contestant. One team wore red sweaters and the other blue over their street clothes.

Because the team colors were indistinguishable on monochrome-only television sets (which were still somewhat common in 1975), the words "REDS" and "BLUES" were later printed on the front of each team member's sweater for the benefit of home viewers.

=== Format #1 ===
One team was isolated while two members of the other team acted out a series of words to their partner for sixty seconds. The actors could alternate in acting, and the guessing partner could pass on a word if he or she got stuck, but he or she could do that only once per turn. When time ran out, the isolated team returned to the stage and acted out the same words as the first team. The team that guessed the most words in their own minute won the round, and the first team to win two rounds won the game.

If a round ended in a tie, a tiebreaker round was played in which both teams had 30 seconds to act out three words. The team that does that in the fastest time wins.

=== Format #2 ===
Towards the end of the show's run, the method for winning the game changed. In this format, a team had to correctly convey and guess seven words or more to win.

Extra rounds were played if the goal had not been reached by the end of a full round, and the tiebreaker was cut to two words in 30 seconds.

Either way, the contestant on the winning team won a $1,000 prize package plus a chance to play the Payoff Round.

== Payoff round ==
=== Format #1 ===
All four celebrities alternated turns acting out a series of words for the winning contestant to guess during the next 60 seconds during the first round, with each correct answer worth $1. When time ran out, one celebrity the contestant chose had 30 seconds to act out three words during the second round.

Each word added a zero to the winning player's round one winnings. Guessing one word correctly was worth 10 times the money, two words 100 times, and all three 1,000 times the money earned in the first phase. As much as $10,000 could be won in this format.

=== Format #2 ===
When the front game changed, the bonus round was also revised. Now, the winning contestant acted out a maximum of three words to one of his or her two celebrity partners. He or she acted out the first two words for 10 seconds each, with those words worth $1,000 each.

The contestant could choose to stop after either of the two were guessed or risk half of his or her earnings to that point and continue. On the third and final word (usually more difficult than the first two), the contestant acted it out for 15 seconds, and if the celebrity partner guessed it, the contestant won $3,000 more, for a total of $5,000.

If at any point the celebrity partners failed to guess a word correctly when time ran out, the contestant lost half of his or her money earned up to that point, and the game ended.

Regardless of either format, the champion switched teams and competed against the next contestant, unless he or she was beaten or had accumulated at least $20,000 in total winnings.

== Sounds ==
The sound effects used on Showoffs would later be employed on Goodson-Todman's Family Feud – the bell, which sounded whenever a teammate guessed the word correctly, became the clang for revealing answers. The dings for winning a game were also later heard on the show. The time's-up buzzer was later used as the strike buzzer.

Additionally, when a player lost the bonus round, the "Losing Horns" fanfare from The Price Is Right was played.

== Broadcast history ==
=== Pilot ===
On May 24, 1975, Larry Blyden hosted a couple pilots for Showoffs. Elaine Joyce, Ron Masak, Linda Kaye Henning, and Dick Gautier were the celebrities, and the format was the one used in the first half of the series' run.

=== Series ===
Shortly after the pilots finished taping, Blyden took a short vacation to Morocco. While there, he lost control of his rental vehicle, which crashed and overturned on the side of the road, and suffered injuries that would claim his life on June 6, 1975. Since the show was set to begin taping shortly after, Goodson-Todman needed to find a substitute on very short notice and chose Van, who had been a fixture for the company on Tattletales and Match Game.

Showoffs debuted on June 30, 1975, at noon (11:00 am Central), replacing Password and inheriting its predecessor's ratings problems. Despite facing Magnificent Marble Machine on NBC, Showoffs could not make any dent in CBS's The Young and the Restless, which had become a top-ten show by that point.

The game finished its six-month run on the day after Christmas and bowed out in favor of Let's Make a Deal, which left its 1:30 pm (12:30 Central) slot after over eleven years on two different networks; the ABC version would be canceled six months later. A scheduling shuffle involving Rhyme and Reason made way for The Neighbors.

=== Revivals ===
Showoffs was later revived on CBS from 1984 to 1986 under the title Body Language with Tom Kennedy as host. Johnny Olson announced from the debut through his death in October 1985, after which Gene Wood (Showoffs' announcer) and Bob Hilton announced through the end of the run. Additionally, Kennedy once said about the show that "Goodson was in love with Showoffs, so he asked his staff to rework the idea!".

An unsold pilot for ABC called Body Talk was hosted by one of the celebrity players Vicki Lawrence and was announced by rotating Body Language announcer Gene Wood. It was taped from October 11 until 12, 1990.

The online Buzzr version of Body Language hosted by internet personality Cynthia LuCiette featured various internet personalities from YouTube instead of a celebrity and civilian combination aired in 2015.

== Episode status ==
The series is believed to have been wiped, as per network practices of that era. Reportedly, only one episode is known to exist, and it is among tape traders in varied quality. Originally broadcast on November 28, guest celebrity Dr. Joyce Brothers injured herself on that episode, requiring celebrity partner Dick Gautier to do her portion of the charades alone for the final round. Karen Morrow and Mike Farrell were the other two celebrities that day.

The UCLA Film and Television Archive holds one of the Blyden's pilots; a clip was shown in VH-1's 2005 series Game Show Moments Gone Bananas. Wink Martindale's YouTube page released one of the pilots starting on January 19, 2021.

The episode broadcast on Christmas Day is also held at UCLA and was aired by Buzzr on September 25, 2021, as part of their annual Lost and Found marathon.

== International versions ==
Country	Name	Host	Network	Premiere	Finale
Wales	Stumiau	Gari Williams	S4C	January 18, 1986	June 28, 1989
Wales	Stumiau	Idris Charles	S4C	January 18, 1986	June 28, 1989
