= Josh Sapan =

American television executive

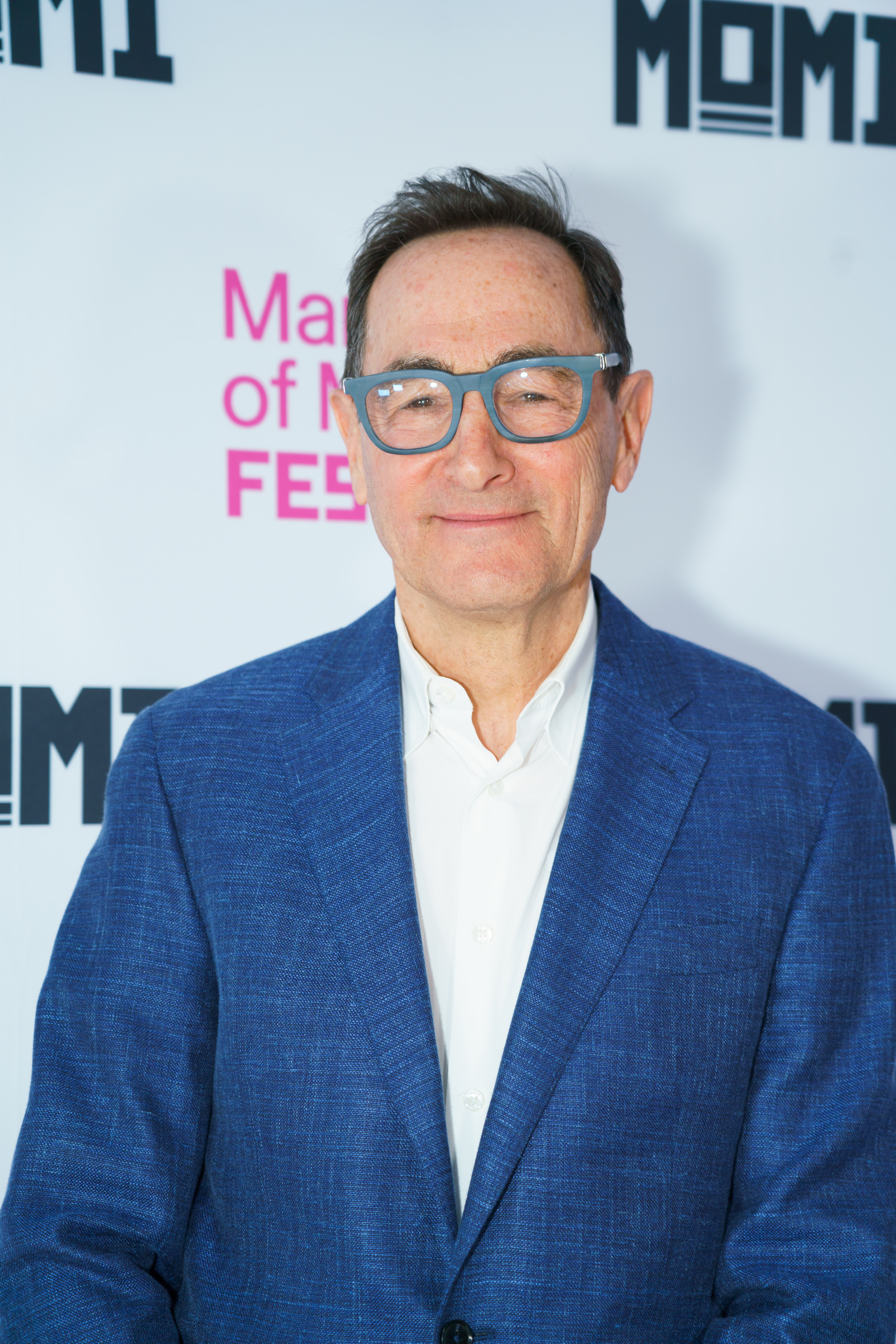
- Born: November 28, 1950 (age 75)
- Education: University of Wisconsin-Madison
- Occupations: President and Chief Executive Officer of AMC Networks

Josh Sapan (born 1950) is a media and entertainment executive who served as the President and Chief Executive Officer of AMC Networks.

He has led AMC Networks since 1995, including its spin-off from Cablevision in 2011. Sapan led the launch of IFC Films in 2000. Previously known largely for re-airing classic movies, AMC produced more original content during his tenure and began moving into streaming.

Prior to the company's spin-off into AMC Networks, Sapan was president of Rainbow Media's National Entertainment Division (a subsidiary of Cablevision Systems Corporation) where he oversaw AMC and Bravo.

== Life and education ==
Sapan was born to a Jewish family in Queens, New York. His father worked in advertising, and his mother was an off-off-Broadway actress. Sapan was raised in Little Neck, Queens and attended P.S. 187. Sapan studied radio, television and film at the University of Wisconsin–Madison, but left school in 1970 moving to Boulder, Colorado and later Berkeley, California.

When he returned to college at UW-Madison, Sapan worked for a company that “four-walled” films, taking 35 mm prints of wilderness films to theaters rented by the film company in small towns in Wisconsin. He performed at Broom Street opposite André De Shields who would later star in "The Wiz" on Broadway. Part of a film society in college, Sapan purchased two 16 mm projectors and established a mobile movie exhibition business, the Court Street Theatre, in Athens Ohio.

After graduating from UW-Madison in 1975, Sapan returned to New York City and worked various jobs including as a labor union organizer for the nursing home and hospital industry's Local 1114, later subsumed into Local 1199. He successfully organized the King James nursing home for that union.

During this time, Sapan volunteered at UA Columbia Cablevision in Wayne & Pompton townships New Jersey. Sapan then sold a series of shows to the UA Columbia, producing and hosting a show called Student Film Review in which he interviewed and showed area filmmakers' short films.

== Career ==
Sapan began his career in cable television at Tele-PrompTer Manhattan Cable TV, which later became Time Warner Cable. He later joined the premium pay-TV service Showtime, where he led marketing, creative services and on-air programming.

=== Rainbow Media ===
In 1987, Sapan joined the National Entertainment Division of Rainbow Media, a programming subsidiary of Cablevision Systems Corporation, as president of AMC and Bravo He was named CEO of Rainbow Media in 1995. Under Sapan, Rainbow Media launched WE tv and IFC (Independent Film Channel), and in 2002, sold Bravo to NBC for $1.25 billion in stock and cash. In 2005, Sapan opened New York City's IFC Center, the brick-and-mortar home for the IFC Films brand and home to DOC NYC, the largest documentary film festival in the United States.

In May 2008, Sapan led the company's acquisition of Sundance Channel from General Electric Company's NBC Universal, CBS Corporation's Showtime Networks, and entities controlled by Robert Redford. Under Sapan's leadership, Sundance Channel expanded into original programming with series such as Carlos, Rectify, Top of the Lake and The Honorable Woman.

In 2010, Sapan led the creation of AMC Studios, the company's in-house production and distribution arm. AMC Studios’ first production was The Walking Dead.

=== AMC Networks ===
Sapan led the company's spin-off from Cablevision Systems Corporation and in June 2011 AMC Networks began trading as a separate public company on the NASDAQ stock exchange. In 2014, Sapan expanded the company's footprint with the acquisition of Liberty Global's international channels portfolio. In 2014, the company also entered into a partnership agreement with BBC Worldwide (now called BBC Studios) to acquire a 49.9% stake in the BBC AMERICA cable channel, giving AMC Networks operational control of the channel.

Under Sapan, AMC Networks was a creator of targeted subscription video on demand services. In 2014, Sapan led the company's launch of Doc Club, now called Sundance Now, dedicated to true crime, thrillers and dramas followed by the 2015 launch of horror-focused streaming service Shudder. In 2018, Sapan led AMC Networks’ acquisition of RLJ Entertainment, home to streaming services Acorn TV, specializing in mysteries and drama, and UMC (now ALLBLK).

In 2018, Sapan also led the acquisition of Levity Live and he led AMC Networks to join 21st Century Fox and Sky Plc in a $75 million funding round for sports TV service FuboTV. Sapan oversaw the creation of AMC Networks’ two subscription video on demand bundles, AMC+ and WE tv+, which launched in June 2020 on Comcast's Xfinity platform. Later in 2020, AMC Networks expanded the bundles to customers of DISH and Sling TV followed by Amazon Prime Video Channels and Apple TV channels.

On August 23, 2021, Sapan stepped down as president and chief executive officer of AMC Networks and was succeeded by interim CEO Matt Blank. He assumed the role of executive vice chairman. As part of his transition agreement, Sapan signed a deal to produce at least six independent films for IFC Films in 2023 and 2024, with AMC Networks agreeing to acquire each film for $900,000. In 2021, Sapan received $15.3 million in compensation, up from $11.8 million in 2020.

=== Sapan Studios ===
After leaving AMC Networks, Sapan founded Sapan Studio LLC, a media company and independent film producer. The studio works with IFC Films on film acquisitions and theatrical distribution.

Notable acquisitions by Sapan Studio include The Pot-au-Feu (also released as The Taste of Things), directed by Trần Anh Hùng and awarded at the 2023 Cannes Film Festival; Ghostlight, which premiered at the 2024 Sundance Film Festival; The Luckiest Man in America, acquired after its premiere at the 2024 Toronto International Film Festival; and The Baltimorons, directed by Jay Duplass, acquired following its 2025 premiere at South by Southwest.

== Other activities ==
Sapan owns the world's largest collection of antique lightning rods, a selection of which is on permanent display at the Franklin Institute in Philadelphia. Partnering with the Museum of the Moving Image in Queens, NY, Sapan launched Marvels of Media in May 2022 with an exhibition, awards ceremony, and festival celebrating autistic media-makers. For its inaugural year, more than 3,000 entries were received from 117 countries. In September 2022, Sapan became an “Executive in Residence” at Columbia University’s Graduate Business School.

=== Theater ===
Sapan has purchased and operated the Greenport Theatre in Greenport, NY on the north fork of Long Island since 2004. He renovated the theatre to restore and protect its 1939 architectural components. It is home to the Manhattan Film Institute's North Fork Summer Workshop. It also features the North Fork Television Festival for independent television content.

=== Books ===
Sapan is the author of The Big Picture: America in Panorama (Princeton Architectural Press), a collection of 20th century panoramic photographs. In 2022, Sapan wrote and published a book, Third Act: Reinventing Your Next Chapter, focusing on celebrities who reach retirement age. The book profiles 60 people such as Gloria Steinem, Cong.James Clyburn, Jane Fonda, Rita Moreno, Robert Redford, Norman Lear and Alan Alda. In August 2023, Sapan published a poetry collection, Rx, through Red Hen Press.

In 2023, Sapan founded the Riverwriters’ Retreat at his cabin in Milford, Pennsylvania, offering residencies for emerging poets in partnership with the KGB Bar & Lit Club. The retreat’s first cohort of six poets participated in fall 2023, with a concluding reading held at KGB Bar in March 2024.

== Personal life ==
Sapan is married to Ann Foley, a former television executive at Showtime. The family resides in Manhattan’s Upper West Side.
