= The Neighbors (game show) =

- Genre: Game show
- Presented by: Regis Philbin
- Starring: Jane Nelson
- Announcer: Joe Seiter
- Country of origin: United States
- No. of episodes: 65

Production
- Producer: Bill Carruthers
- Running time: approx. 26 minutes
- Production company: Carruthers Company

Original release
- Network: ABC
- Release: December 29, 1975 – April 9, 1976

The Neighbors is an American game show. It aired on ABC from December 29, 1975 to April 9, 1976. It included five female neighbors as contestants, who were asked gossip questions about each other. Regis Philbin co-hosted the show with Jane Nelson, and Joe Seiter was the announcer. It was produced by Bill Carruthers.

The show aired at 2:30pm, replacing Showoffs, in a scheduling shuffle with Let's Make a Deal and Rhyme and Reason. However, it was beaten by soap operas Guiding Light on CBS, and The Doctors on NBC. The game show was part of Fred Silverman's plan to align ABC's daytime image.

== Gameplay ==
Two female neighbors competed for cash by answering questions about a panel of three of their neighbors. Philbin read a statement about one of the two contestants and the contestants must guess which contestant most of the panel felt that question applied to. Correct answers scored $25.

In round 2, the contestants must guess which panelist made a particular statement about that player. A correct selection scored $50 while the selected panelist earned $25 whether correct or not.

In round 3, a statement would be read about one of the two contestants, made as a unanimous opinion by all three panelists. The first player to buzz in and choose the correct neighbor earned money. Choosing the wrong neighbor won the opposing neighbor the money. The first question scored $50, the second question was worth $100, $150 for the third, $200 for the fourth, and $300 for the fifth question. After the fifth question, the player with the most money won a bonus prize.
