= House of Mouse =

American animated crossover television series

- Genre: Comedy; Crossover
- Based on: Mickey Mouse by Walt Disney and Ub Iwerks; Disney Animated Canon by Walt Disney Feature Animation
- Developed by: Bobs Gannaway; Tony Craig
- Directed by: Bobs Gannaway; Tony Craig
- Presented by: Wayne Allwine
- Voices of: Wayne Allwine; Tony Anselmo; Russi Taylor; Tress MacNeille; Bill Farmer; Jason Marsden; Corey Burton; Jim Cummings; April Winchell
- Narrated by: Rod Roddy
- Theme music composer: Brian Setzer
- Composers: Michael Tavera; Stephen James Taylor (Mickey Mouse Works cartoons)
- Country of origin: United States
- No. of seasons: 3
- No. of episodes: 52 (list of episodes)

Production
- Executive producers: Bobs Gannaway; Tony Craig
- Producer: Melinda Rediger
- Running time: 21–22 minutes (6–7 minutes per segment)
- Production company: Walt Disney Television Animation

Original release
- Network: ABC (Disney's One Saturday Morning)
- Release: January 13, 2001 – May 18, 2002
- Network: Toon Disney
- Release: September 2, 2002 – October 24, 2003

Related
- Mickey Mouse Works; Have a Laugh!

Disney's House of Mouse (or simply House of Mouse) is an American crossover animated television series produced by Walt Disney Television Animation that originally aired on ABC (under Disney's One Saturday Morning) from January 13, 2001 to May 18, 2002, and later Toon Disney from September 2, 2002, to October 24, 2003, with 52 episodes. The show focuses on Mickey Mouse and his friends running a cartoon theater dinner club in the fictional setting of ToonTown, catering to many characters from Disney cartoons and animated movies while showcasing a variety of their cartoon shorts. The series is named after a common nickname or epithet for the Walt Disney Company.

The animated series is a spin-off of the series Mickey Mouse Works, and featured many of the series' shorts as well as a selection of brand new shorts, and classic Mickey Mouse, Goofy and Donald Duck shorts from the 1930s–50s.

During its time, the animated series held two nominations for awards, while select cast members won two awards for their performances as characters in House of Mouse. The series featured two direct-to-video films – Mickey's Magical Christmas: Snowed in at the House of Mouse and Mickey's House of Villains.

== Premise ==
Mickey Mouse and his friends run the House of Mouse nightclub together.

The basic premise of the show focuses on Mickey Mouse and his friends operating a dinner theater club in downtown ToonTown. Considered a popular venue by the residents, the club is frequented by a host of characters from Disney animated properties; a feature of the series is that every film produced by Walt Disney Feature Animation prior to the start of the series (between and including Snow White and the Seven Dwarfs and Atlantis: The Lost Empire, with the exception of the CGI Dinosaur) are featured in the series. Such characters mostly appear as paying guests of the club, and would often have speaking roles, although a number sometimes operate as performers for the club. The series also includes many relatively obscure and otherwise rarely used Disney characters, often with speaking parts for the first time – for example, Li'l Bad Wolf and April, May and June, who had appeared very often in Disney comic books but never before in an animated cartoon, made their animated debuts on House of Mouse. The show also featured some cameos by characters created for other television cartoons such as Pepper Ann and theme park attractions like The Haunted Mansion, but these appearances were few and far between.

Each episode focuses on a story involving Mickey and his associates facing an issue during an evening's operation of the club, and their efforts to overcome it – the most common plot for episodes involves the group dealing with a serious problem caused by Pete in his attempts to shut down the club and use it for his own gains. These stories, often involving farcical mishaps, tended to act as a wraparound for the cartoon shorts played in between scenes, the theme of the story contributing towards the story-lines of the cartoon shorts shown in the episode. Cartoon shorts played in episodes focused on elements from classic theatrical cartoons of the 1930s, 1940s and 1950s, though most were reruns from Mickey Mouse Works, and featured a simple story.

== Episodes ==
| Season | Episodes | Originally released | | |
| Season | Episodes | First released | Last released | Network |
|---|---|---|---|---|
| 1 | 13 | January 13, 2001 | April 14, 2001 | ABC |
| 2 | 13 | September 22, 2001 | May 18, 2002 | ABC |
| Films | 2 | November 6, 2001 | September 3, 2002 | Direct-to-video |
| 3 | 26 | September 2, 2002 | October 24, 2003 | Toon Disney |

== Voice cast ==
- Mickey Mouse (voiced by Wayne Allwine): Mickey operates the club as general manager and co-owner, but leaves the club's management to his friends. His main role in the club is hosting the evening's entertainment as its showbiz superstar.
- Minnie Mouse (voiced by Russi Taylor): Minnie operates as the club's show planner and bookkeeper, and is responsible for the club's day-to-day administration. Her performance at keeping the club running well makes her a pillar of support in times of crisis, especially in keeping Mickey calm when he panics over a situation.
- Donald Duck (voiced by Tony Anselmo): Donald operates as the club's deputy manager, responsible for the overall customer service at the club and tending to the needs of VIP guests. Although a co-owner in the club, he is envious of Mickey's fame and position and tends to want to run the club himself, though his efforts are usually thwarted by his conscience preventing him betraying his friendship with Mickey.
- Daisy Duck (voiced by Tress MacNeille): Daisy operates as the reservation clerk for the club, but often dreams of being a star in her own right, which often sees her attempting to try out a new act in the club that often backfires.
- Goofy (voiced by Bill Farmer): Goofy operates as the head waiter, managing the club's restaurant operations with his usual accident-prone yet genial manner of work. Despite this difficulty, Goofy manages to ensure guests receive their meals without issues.
- Pluto (voiced by Bill Farmer): Pluto operates as both the club's mascot, and as a personal assistant to both Mickey and Minnie.
- Horace Horsecollar (voiced by Bill Farmer): Horace operates as the club's technical engineer, in charge of the lighting, loudspeakers, and video players. A recurring gag in the animated series is his habit of literally doing as told and hitting his equipment to get them working, and a tendency to complain about social issues instead of answering questions.
- Clarabelle Cow (voiced by April Winchell): Clarabelle operates as the club's gossip monger with her own show, collecting and spreading rumours about characters all over ToonTown, although her gossip tends to occasionally cause problems as a result.
- Max Goof (voiced by Jason Marsden): Max operates as the club's valet parking attendant. He tends to enjoy his work, though a number of episodes feature stories about him debating over things he witnesses or wishes to enjoy.
- Huey, Dewey, and Louie (all voiced by Tony Anselmo): Huey, Dewey and Louie operate as the club's house band. Throughout the course of the animated series' run, the trio operated under different names and genres of music, parodying noted music bands of the time, such as "The Quackstreet Boys", "Quackwerk", "Kid Duck" and "The Splashing Pumpkins".
- Gus Goose (voiced by Frank Welker): Gus operates as the club's chef, but his notorious gluttony tends to cause him to eat the food he prepares for guests before it is served.
- Magic Mirror (voiced by Tony Jay): Magic Mirror acts as the club's on-site consultant, often providing advice when asked by Mickey and his friends, as well as answering queries about the club's guests.
- Mic (pronounced "Mike") (voiced by Rod Roddy): Mic is a talking microphone, who operates as the club's announcer. The character is mainly involved at the beginning and end of the episodes, the latter often involving him providing a fictional advert connected to one of Disney's characters, cartoons, or animated films.
- Pete (voiced by Jim Cummings): Commonly referred to as Bad Pete by others, is the show's main antagonist and the club's shady landlord. Episodes featuring him tend to involve him seeking a way to shut down the club — per a contract he made with Mickey at the start of the animated series to own the House of Mouse, the club can only be shut down if there is no show going on. His efforts to do so always backfire.

== Production ==
Then vice president of Disney Television Animation at the time, Barry Blumberg, wanted to produce a series that worked as a better format for Mickey Mouse Works. Bobs Gannaway and Tony Craig aimed to have the series reintroduce Disney characters to a new generation who were only familiar with them via marketing and "homogenized theme-park figures". They wanted to avoid making Mickey Mouse "hip" or "edgy" and retain the characters' personalities as closely as possible. The series was notable in that it allowed the characters to be played with more loosely as Craig stated, "Everybody thought it was really funny to loosen up a bit and let the characters be who they were and have some fun, instead of being so stiff". The crew was not allowed to use any of the characters from Tarzan due to licensing issues. Gannaway and Craig also deliberately tried to avoid using characters from The Hunchback of Notre Dame due to them being "inherently dramatic", nevertheless, Tantor, Quasimodo and a few other characters from The Hunchback of Notre Dame would make a couple of cameos in the series. There were other limits for this program as well, which forbids the use of Pixar characters due to Disney not owning content from Pixar prior to 2006 and King Louie following a legal dispute. This even omits characters created for the direct-to-video sequels due to the show’s primarily focus on characters that are of Disney canon with a few exceptions.

The show was produced by Walt Disney Television, and originally aired from 2001 to 2003, running for 52 episodes. The show is one of many Disney cartoon series made in the widescreen HD format. Like with Mickey Mouse Works, the animation was outsourced to Toon City in the Philippines. Unlike that series, it was also outsourced to Walt Disney Animation Australia and Walt Disney Animation Japan.

The theme song is performed by Brian Setzer.

== Broadcast ==
House of Mouse aired on One Saturday Morning on ABC. It reran from September 9, 2002 to February 4, 2006 on Disney Channel. The show ceased broadcast on U.S. television on February 6, 2009, after being aired for the last time on Toon Disney before becoming Disney XD.

== Reception ==
=== Critical response ===
Noah Bell of Collider stated, "For Disney fans growing up in the 2000s, House of Mouse was like a dream brought to life. Taking place primarily in a dinner club owned by Mickey, the show featured characters from virtually every Disney film made at that point interacting on a scale never seen before or since. With people's love of crossovers only growing since the series ended, an updated House of Mouse could have a lot going for it." Gabriel Stanford-Reisinger of FanSided asserted, "While it didn't last as long as others, it proved to be a fan-favorite."

Rafael Sarmiento of Screen Rant ranked House of Mouse fourteenth in their "15 Best Kid's Cartoons Of The 2000s" list, writing, "House of Mouse is among the best cartoons of the 2000s for exemplifying just how fun the era was for Disney cartoons." Max Spirenkov of Looper ranked House of Mouse twentieth in their "50 Best Kids Shows Of The 2000s" list, saying, "Longtime fans of Disney films will absolutely adore this series, as Mickey winds up being the host to just about every character you could ask for throughout Disney cinema history. If hosting one of the biggest crossovers in television wasn't enough, the comical nature of the show provides a new angle to many iconic characters from older films, especially in its portrayal of some of the most notable villains over the years."

=== Accolades ===
| Year | Award | Category | Nominee(s) and recipient(s) | Result | Ref. |
|---|---|---|---|---|---|
| 2001 | Annie Awards | Best Daytime Animated Television Production | House of Mouse | Nominated | |
| 2002 | Daytime Emmy Awards | Outstanding Individual in Animation | Chris Roszak | Won | |
| 2002 | Golden Reel Awards | Best Sound Editing in Television - Music, Episodic Animation | Jason Oliver, Liz Lachman (for "Pit Crew" and "Golf Nut Donald") | Nominated | |
| 2003 | Annie Awards | Outstanding Voice Acting in an Animated Television Production | Corey Burton | Won | |

== See also ==
- Once Upon a Studio, a live-action/animated short film that also serves as a crossover of many characters from Disney's animated features and shorts.
