= Press Your Luck scandal =

1984 dramatic TV game-show success

The Press Your Luck scandal was contestant Michael Larson's 1984 record-breaking win of $110,237 (equivalent to $341,622 in 2025) on the American game show Press Your Luck.

An Ohio man with a penchant for get-rich-quick schemes, Larson studied the game show and discovered that its ostensibly randomized game board was actually only five different patterns of lights. After successfully auditioning in person at the Los Angeles studio, Larson performed on May 19, 1984, and played so successfully that CBS executives accused him of cheating.

A recurring subject of interest and inspiration, the Press Your Luck scandal has been revisited in two documentaries by Game Show Network, a Spanish-language graphic novel, and the 2024 film The Luckiest Man in America, starring Paul Walter Hauser as Larson.

== Background ==
=== Press Your Luck ===
CBS' Press Your Luck is a half-hour television game show that ran from September 1983 to September 1986, hosted by Peter Tomarken.

Each half of the show began with a round of multiple-choice questions, in which correct answers earned "spins" on a randomly generated game board known as the "Big Board". The Big Board was a ring of 18 light-up squares, six wide and five high, that rapidly illuminated in a random sequence until a contestant pressed their button to stop the lights. The sequence was originally limited to only five different patterns, a holdover from the pilot episode's limited budget, an Achilles' heel and calculated risk understood by the show's producers.

Each chosen square represented three results, including prizes such as vacations, cash, and extra spins on the board; each spin also had a one-in-six chance to display a "Whammy", an animated character who eliminated that contestant's accumulated winnings. Over the show's first few episodes, winnings averaged about US$14,000 (equivalent to about $45,000 in 2025).

=== Michael Larson ===
Michael Larson
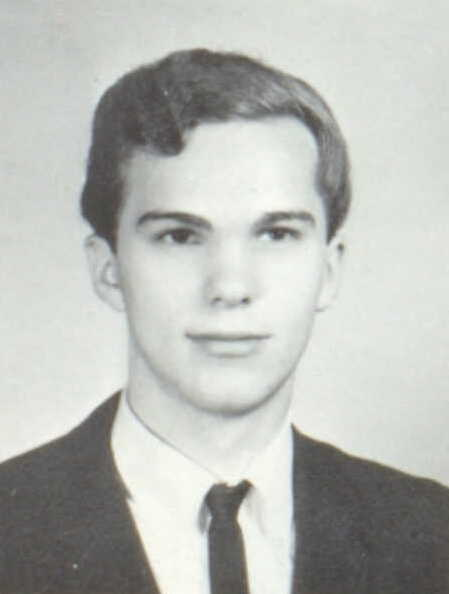
- Michael Larson in his Lebanon High School yearbook, The 1967 Trilobite
- Born: Paul Michael Larson; May 10, 1949; Lebanon, Ohio, US
- Died: February 16, 1999 (aged 49); Apopka, Florida, US
- Other name: "Mike"
- Occupations: Air conditioning repair; ice cream truck driver
- Children: 3

Paul Michael "Mike" Larson was born to Ruth Larson on May 10, 1949 in Lebanon, Ohio. One of four brothers, he graduated from Lebanon High School in 1967. By 1983, he was twice divorced and living at the home of his girlfriend, Teresa Dinwitty; she would later say of her "boyfriend and common-law husband, 'He always thought he was smarter than everybody else,' and that he had a 'constant yearning for knowledge.'" Larson had three children by three different women.

Larson's penchant for "always running some little scam or another" began at an early age, secretly selling marked-up candy bars to other middle-school students. Other schemes included repeatedly opening and closing bank accounts under assumed identities with those that offered $500 for each new customer. He once registered a business under a family member's name so as to fire himself and collect unemployment insurance. He was arrested by Ohio law enforcement three times between 1969 and 1982 for receiving and concealing stolen goods, larceny by trick, and petty theft.

By 1983, he worked repairing air conditioning systems, drove a Mister Softee-branded ice cream truck, and spent the rest of his time studying a wall of twelve televisions and looking for get-rich-quick schemes.

== Preparation ==
One of the five Big Board light patterns found by Larson

Larson first saw Press Your Luck in November 1983. He bought a videocassette recorder (VCR), spent weeks analyzing the Big Board, and came to two conclusions: the lights moved in five different predetermined patterns, not randomly, and the fourth and eighth squares always contained cash and an extra spin. Larson spent the next few months honing his skill at the game, using the VCR pause button to practice his timing.

Larson spent the last of his money flying from Ohio to Hollywood in May 1984, and auditioned for Press Your Luck. Hyping himself as an appealing contestant, he told interviewers about being unemployed, his bus ride to Hollywood out of love for the show, being unable to afford a birthday gift for his six-year-old daughter, and buying his dress shirt at a thrift store down the street for $0.65 (equivalent to $2.01 in 2025). Bill Carruthers, the show's executive producer, was impressed by Larson and won over by his charisma. Contestant coordinator Bob Edwards did not recommend Larson, but because he could not articulate why, Carruthers overruled the decision.

== Episode ==
5.19.84
- Press Your Luck episode
- Presented by: Peter Tomarken
- Production code: 0188
- Original air dates: June 8, 1984; June 11, 1984

Larson's episode of Press Your Luck was recorded on May 19, 1984. With production code number 0188, the episode was produced by Bill Mitchell and executive produced by show co-creator Bill Carruthers.

Larson was seated at the center lectern. To his right was returning champion Ed Long from California, a Baptist minister; to his left was dental assistant Janie Litras. In the first question round, Larson earned three spins. He stopped his first spin on square 17, which revealed a Whammy, but also allowed him to calibrate the timing of his button presses. His next two spins landed on square four, giving Larson the lowest first-half total of $2,500 (equivalent to $7,747 in 2025), while both Long and Litras managed to avoid the Whammy and accumulated $4,080 (equivalent to $12,644 in 2025) and $4,608 (equivalent to $14,280 in 2025) with their spins.

=== Second half ===
Big Board prizes in the second half; "+S" indicates free spins

In the second question round, Larson earned seven initial spins of the Big Board, and his last-place position earned him the first spin. In his first 15 spins, Larson occasionally missed his safe squares of four and eight, but was successful in avoiding Whammies, earning cash and prizes of $29,351 (equivalent to $90,958 in 2025). Beginning with spin 16, he then landed only on squares four and eight for 29 consecutive spins, totaling $102,851 (equivalent to $318,733 in 2025) in cash and prizes. After this 44th overall spin, Larson lost focus. On spin 45, Larson missed the extra-spin squares: "I remember that moment. I was just so drained, [...] I suddenly forgot where the Whammies were. So I stopped and passed control of the board to the other players. I felt so relieved that it was over." Janie Litras received Larson's remaining spins, and control of the Big Board went to Ed Long. He Whammied on his first spin, and then hit $5,000 + One Spin twice in a row before hitting another Whammy with his final spin.

When the show's control-booth operators realized what Larson was doing, they called Michael Brockman, CBS's head of daytime programming. Brockman later told TV Guide, "Something was very wrong [...] Here was this guy from nowhere, and he was hitting the bonus box every time. It was bedlam, I can tell you." Press Your Luck producers wanted to stop the show, but, with no apparent rule-breaking by Larson, they were forced to let it continue.

Larson's spins
Square	Hits	Totals
4	24 (55%)	$89,500
6	1 (2%)	$2,250
7	2 (5%)	$2,651 †
8	17 (39%)	$12,500
17	3 (7%)	$3,336 †
† includes prizes

When Litras's turn came around, she passed her last three spins to Larson, who was obligated by the rules to use them. Larson stopped the first two spins in squares four and eight, but he stopped the third too early, and it landed on square 17. Instead of the Whammy again, though, it was a trip to the Bahamas. Michael passed the spins he had gotten during his turn back to Janie, who was unable to get any more from the board. The final spin Janie took was a Mexican Cruise. After 47 spins of the Big Board, Michael Larson had won cash and prizes (including a sailboat and all-inclusive vacations to Kauai and the Bahamas) totaling $110,237 (equivalent to $341,622 in 2025). Ed Long still received his $11,516 (equivalent to $35,688 in 2025) from the previous episode, while Janie Litras was left with the consolation prizes.

=== Fallout ===
CBS's Standards and Practices department thought that Larson had cheated and was not entitled to his winnings. Network executives pored over the footage but found no evidence of malfeasance. Former executive for CBS Daytime programming Bob Boden explained in 2007 the network's "prevailing wisdom [...] was that he hadn't cheated; that he was just smarter than CBS." A few weeks later, they mailed Larson a check. He was ineligible to return to the show (as Long had done) because he had exceeded the network's limit of $25,000.

The episode aired on June 8 and 11, 1984, broken into two parts due to its length. Some at CBS had wanted to cancel the episode entirely, and afterward made the decision that it never be aired again, even including that requirement with their broadcast syndication contracts (it has since re-aired on both Game Show Network and Buzzr multiple times). The Big Board was reprogrammed with 27 additional light patterns, and CBS set a $75,000 limit for contestants' winnings. Larson later contacted Press Your Luck's contestant coordinator and issued an unanswered challenge: "I know you've added patterns to the board, but I bet I can beat you again. How about a tournament of champions?"

== Legacy ==
With the 1994 release of the film Quiz Show, Larson appeared on Good Morning America to discuss the film and his performance on Press Your Luck. On March 16, 2003, Game Show Network (GSN) aired its first documentary film; all about the 1984 event, the two-hour Big Bucks: The Press Your Luck Scandal gave the eight-year-old network its highest Nielsen ratings yet, and reunited Litras, Long, and Tomarken. The first episode of GSN's Cover Story documentary series was also about the Press Your Luck win ("The Press Your Luck Scandal"); upon its 7:00 pm, January 14, 2018, broadcast, the hour-long episode was watched by 583,000.

On a March 17, 2003, memorial episode of Whammy! The All-New Press Your Luck (a remake of the original show on GSN), Ed Long and Janie Litras returned to play against Larson's brother, James Larson. In his 2004 book Life as a Loser, Will Leitch credited the Press Your Luck scandal with inspiring his own appearance on Win Ben Stein's Money.

Larson's 1984 record for "most game-show winnings in a single day" was $110,237 (equivalent to $341,622 in 2025), and was the largest win on a daytime game show in the world until Jennifer Miller won £120,000 (equivalent to £212,211 in 2025) on the British version of Deal or No Deal. His reign as the largest U.S. daytime game show winner lasted until 2006 when The Price Is Right contestant Vickyann Chrobak-Sadowski won $147,517 (equivalent to $235,594 in 2025). She was succeeded by Sheree Heil, whose 2013 winnings on the same show totaled $170,345 (equivalent to $235,441 in 2025).

=== Adaptations ===
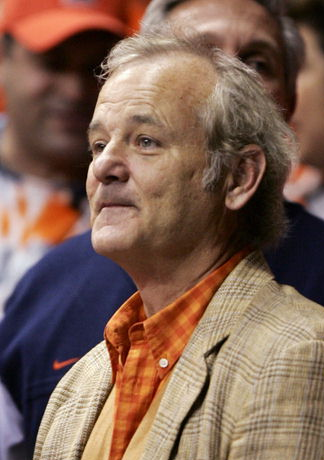
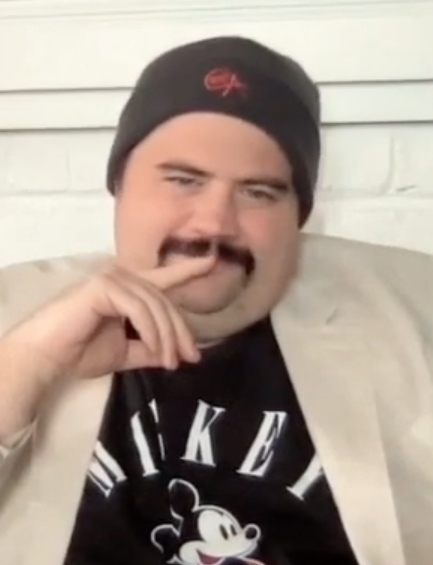
Bill Murray (left, 2006) was attached to play Larson in a planned film. Paul Walter Hauser (right, 2021) played Larson in 2024's The Luckiest Man in America.

A film adaptation of the event was in the works by August 2000; titled Press Your Luck, the comedy film featured Howard Franklin as screenwriter and director, Nicolas Cage as producer, and had cast Bill Murray to portray Larson.

On November 13, 2017, Modernito Books published Larson – El hombre con más suerte del mundo (Larson - The Luckiest Man in the World), a graphic novel by Javi de Castro, about Larson's Press Your Luck winning streak.

On September 5, 2024, the drama–thriller film The Luckiest Man in America premiered at the Toronto International Film Festival, starring Paul Walter Hauser as Larson.

=== Larson ===
Michael Larson paid $28,000 or $35,000 in taxes. He immediately spent some of his winnings buying lavish gifts for his daughter's sixth birthday (the day before the episode filmed); more was invested in a Ponzi scheme involving real estate.

In late 1984, Larson withdrew $100,000 in one-dollar bills to try and win a local radio contest by matching serial numbers. After redepositing half of the bills, the remaining $50,000 (equivalent to about $155,000 in 2025) was stored around Dinwitty's house while the two checked each bill thoroughly. One evening, while the two attended a Christmas party and with neighbors knowing of the cash, burglars stole the money. Larson was convinced Dinwitty was involved in the theft, and she later fled her home with her children until Larson vacated. As of July 2010, the burglary had not been solved.

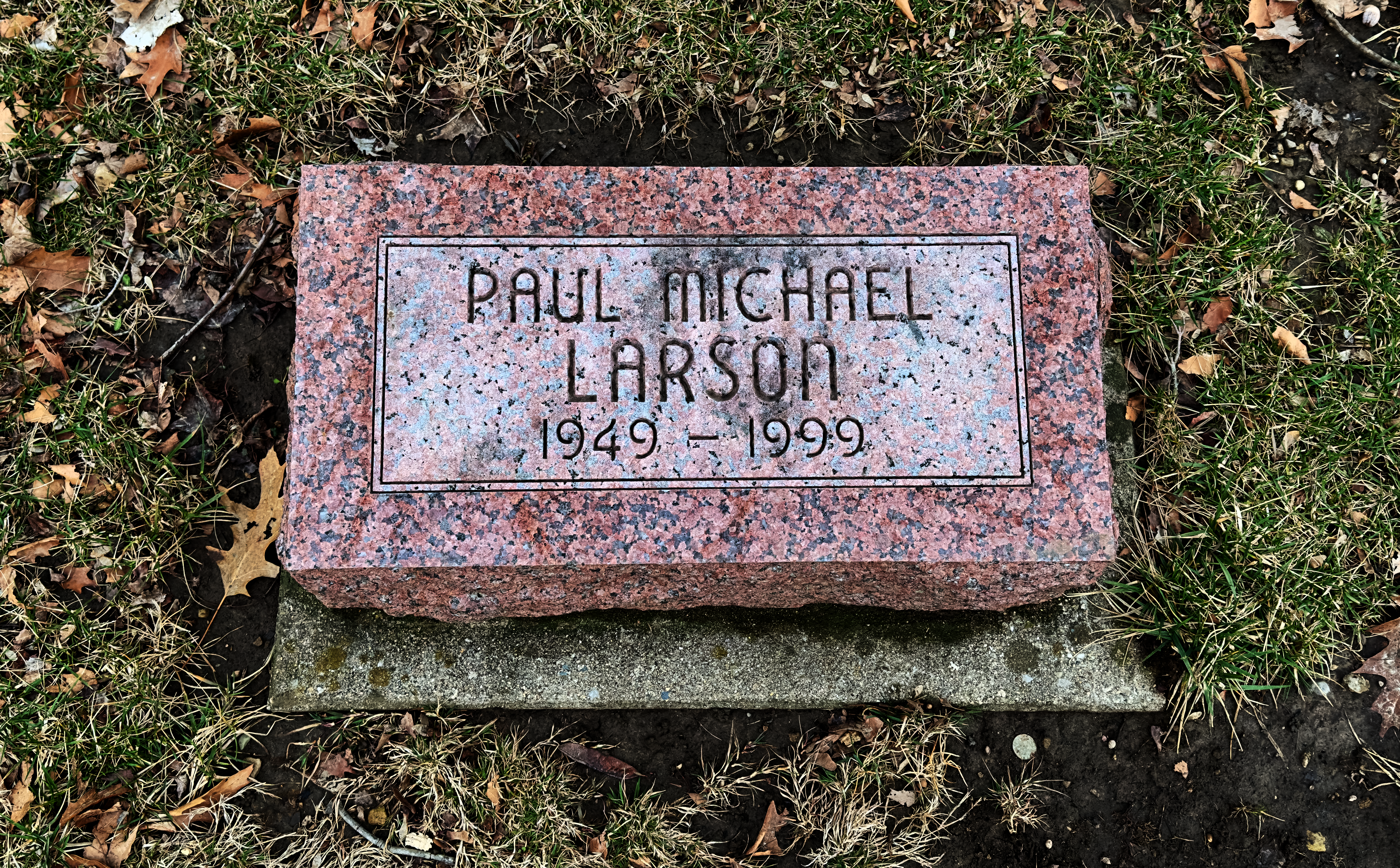
Larson's grave (March 2024)

After working as an assistant manager at Wal-Mart, Larson sold shares in a fraudulent multi-level marketing scheme; in 1995 he was charged for taking $1.8 million (equivalent to about $3.8M in 2025) from 14,000 investors. Under investigation by the Federal Bureau of Investigation, Internal Revenue Service, and U.S. Securities and Exchange Commission, he fled Ohio for Apopka, Florida, where he died of throat cancer on February 16, 1999.

Larson came to be regarded by some as a modern-day folk hero, while others "regard him as a cheap huckster or a likable-but-occasionally-creepy crackpot." In 2003, Variety opined that "[n]either the scandal nor Larson ever hit critical mass à la [the MIT Blackjack Team] and Charles Van Doren". Speaking on Larson's win the same year, the Boston Herald's John Ruch wrote that Larson should be "remembered as an original hacker and a classic American hero." In 2011, Damn Interesting opined that despite the 1984 win having been called a cheat, a scam, or a scandal, "his impressive performance on Press Your Luck may be one of the only honest days of work that Michael Larson ever did."

== See also ==
- 1950s quiz show scandals – Secret collusion between contestants and producers
- Charles Ingram – English fraudster (born 1963)
