= Hot Seat (game show) =

- Created by: Merrill Heatter; Bob Quigley
- Presented by: Jim Peck
- Announcer: Kenny Williams
- Country of origin: United States
- No. of episodes: ~75

Production
- Production locations: The Prospect Studios; Hollywood, California
- Running time: 30 Minutes

Original release
- Network: ABC
- Release: July 12 – October 22, 1976

Hot Seat is an American game show which aired on ABC from July 12 to October 22, 1976. The series was created by Merrill Heatter and Robert Quigley, who were known at this point for their hit game shows Gambit and The Hollywood Squares among others.

Jim Peck was the host, with Kenny Williams as the announcer.

== Game play ==
Two married couples played against each other one at a time. One of the spouses had to guess what the other would say when asked a round of three questions.

The spouse sitting in the "hot seat" would have their emotions measured by an electronic GSR device. Each question would have two choices. The player at the podium would select one answer and the spouse would respond to each choice with a negative response. The arch above the "hot seat" would feature a meter which indicated which answer was more of a lie; the answer that was the most true (the one which had the most lights lit up) was considered the correct answer.

The three questions were worth $100, $200, and $400. The couple with the most money at the end of the show could take either an additional $500 or play a bonus round. Whichever option was not chosen went to their opponents.

In the bonus round, one final question was asked. A correct answer won the couple a trip and a new car; an incorrect answer, however, lost their front game winnings.

== Pilot ==
The pilot, recorded on January 17, 1976, was played the same as the series with the exception of the bonus round: the husband sat in front of a turntable, while the wife saw the lie-detector reactions in another isolation booth. The husband would be shown three prizes (in this case, a washer/dryer combo, an expensive sports car, and a cheap iron with ironing board), and had to say "No, I would not like that prize." for each one. After the husband's third reaction, the wife chose which prize the couple would win.

However, there was a twist: namely, the third prize was modeled by a young lady wearing a bikini. The wife, unaware of this and only seeing that the lie detector had shot to the very end of the scale for the third prize, chose it (again, based on her husband's reaction, which had clearly lied about not wanting the model). After the wife came out of the booth, she screamed in agony upon seeing what the show had done.

== Broadcast history ==
Hot Seat premiered July 12, 1976 at 12:00 Noon Eastern/11:00 AM Central, replacing Let's Make a Deal, which had concluded its 12 and 1/2 year run (7 and 1/2 years on ABC) that Friday. It went up against The Young and the Restless on CBS, and The Fun Factory on NBC and for its last three weeks on air, 50 Grand Slam. Greenlit directly by Fred Silverman, the executive hoped the success of CBS's Gambit, also produced by Heatter-Quigley, would be repeated, though it only lasted through the summer. After Hot Seat ended, The Don Ho Show would take over the ABC noon slot.

== Episode status ==
The series is believed to be destroyed due to network practices. One episode, believed to be the Premiere, exists on the trading circuit in fair quality.
