= Second Chance (game show) =

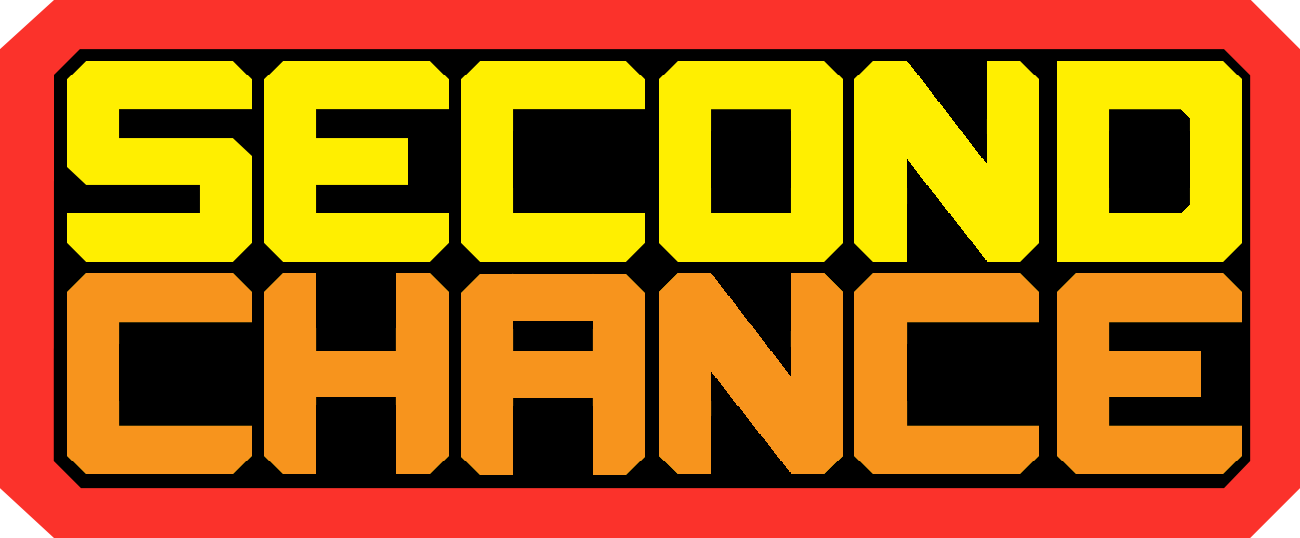
- Genre: Game show
- Created by: Bill Carruthers; Jan McCormack
- Directed by: Chris Darley
- Presented by: Jim Peck
- Announcer: Jay Stewart; Jack Clark; Joe Seiter (pilot/substitute)
- Theme music composer: Score Productions
- Country of origin: United States
- No. of episodes: 95

Production
- Executive producer: Bill Carruthers
- Producer: Joel Stein
- Production locations: ABC Television Center; Hollywood, California
- Running time: approx. 22-26 minutes
- Production companies: The Carruthers Company; Warner Bros. Television

Original release
- Network: ABC
- Release: March 7 – July 15, 1977

Related
- Press Your Luck (1983–1986, 2019–present); Whammy! The All-New Press Your Luck (2002–2003)

Second Chance is an American game show that ran from March 7 to July 15, 1977, on ABC. Jim Peck hosted, with Jay Stewart and Jack Clark serving as announcers. The show was a production of the Carruthers Company in association with Warner Bros. Television.

Second Chance's format was later used, with some adjustments, for the Carruthers Company production Press Your Luck, which premiered in 1983.

== Game play ==
Three contestants competed on each program.

Like its successor series six years later, Second Chance saw contestants answer trivia questions in order to earn spins on a large game board with various cash amounts and prizes. Two rounds of play, consisting of one question round and one board round, were played.

=== Question round ===
Each question round consisted of three questions. After hearing the question, the contestants had five seconds to write their answers on pieces of cardboard and place the answers in a slot in front of them. None of the contestants could see what the others had answered. After the contestants submitted their answers, Peck would give them a hint about how many of them were right or wrong (for instance, if all three contestants offered different answers, Peck might say, “At least two of you are wrong”) and then give all three contestants a chance to change their answers if they wished, selecting from a list of three options.

Correct answers earned points which were converted to "spins" in the second half of the round. Contestants earned three points or one point for answering correctly on the first or second try, respectively.

=== Board round ===
Second Chance game board, as seen in Round One on the 1976 pilot episode

Each contestant used their spins to accumulate money and prizes on an 18-space game board. To do this, the contestants used a buzzer in front of them to stop a flashing randomizer light which moved in a pattern around the board at a high speed, and whatever the randomizer landed on when the contestant stopped it was given to him/her.

The gameboard featured eleven (nine in the pilot) cash squares with orange and yellow backgrounds and four (six in the pilot) squares with gift boxes in them which were used to represent prizes. Once one of these was landed on, a slide showing a prize was revealed and the prize's value was added to the contestant's score. There were also three squares with a cartoon figure referred to as the Devil in them. Hitting one of these cost a contestant whatever he/she had earned to that point, and hitting the Devil four times eliminated a contestant from the game. Unlike the board from the future Press Your Luck, the squares on this board did not change as the randomizer moved; additionally, the randomizer light moved at a much faster pace than Press Your Luck's board ever did.

Initially, the top dollar value in the first round was $2,500 and $5,000 in the second. Later, the second round also rewarded contestants that hit the top dollar value with an additional spin. Later still, the top value decreased to $1,000 in the first round. In the second round, a randomizer with an eggcrate display was placed in the big money square and its value could be anywhere between $1,000 and $5,000 in increments of $1,000. Prizes were typically worth less than $1,000 in the first round and significantly more in the second.

In both rounds when the contestants faced the board, play began with the contestant with the fewest spins and went in ascending order. If any of the contestants were tied, the contestant closest to Peck was given first chance. At any time, a contestant could pass his/her remaining spins. If any of the trailing contestants passed, those spins went to the leader. If the leader passed, they went to the contestant in second place unless there was a tie, in which case the contestant got to select which contestant received them. The contestant receiving the passed spins was forced to take all of them. If a Devil was hit, all of the remaining passed spins (if there were any) became earned spins and the contestant could do what they wanted with them. If the big money square was landed on with a passed spin in the second round, the contestant earned a regular spin.

The contestant in the lead at the end of the second board playing won the game, and kept whatever cash and/or prizes he/she earned. This show did not have returning champions.

== Broadcast history ==
Second Chance debuted on March 7, 1977, at noon ET/11:00 AM CT/MT/PT, replacing a short-lived variety series starring Don Ho (which had itself replaced Peck's Hot Seat on October 25, 1976). Almost immediately, the series faced problems, as the noon timeslot on the network was subject to preemptions for local newscasts and other programming. The CBS soap opera The Young and the Restless, which was starting to become a ratings success in its fourth season, also proved troublesome for Second Chance in the timeslot (NBC, which aired Name That Tune and Shoot for the Stars at noon during the first three months of Second Chance's run, was also struggling).

Unable to compete with the soap on CBS, Second Chance came to an end after nineteen weeks, and aired its final episode on July 15, 1977. The Goodson-Todman game show The Better Sex replaced it the following Monday; that show was placed on hiatus after almost six months in January 1978 in order to allow both General Hospital and One Life to Live to expand to an hour (The Better Sex would ultimately be canceled outright later that year).

== Successor ==
Press Your Luck, a retooling of Second Chance, later aired on CBS from 1983 until 1986. Although both shows featured nearly-identical gameplay, Press Your Luck employed a more colorful, constantly changing gameboard, its villain was the animated "Whammy", and its question rounds were conducted differently. Also, the leader at the end of the first round got to play the board last in the second round while the contestant with the lowest score or, in case of a tie, the leftmost player went first. Also, contestants stayed on the show until they were defeated, won for five straight days, or reached/exceeded the winnings limit in effect for CBS game shows at the time (originally $25,000; raised to $50,000 in November 1984).

The ABC version began in 2019 and does not feature returning champions; however, the winner of each episode goes on to play a bonus round for up to $1 million in cash and prizes.

== Australian version ==
The show ran in Australia in 1977 on Network Ten, hosted by Earle Bailey and Christine Broadway and produced by Reg Grundy. There was later an Australian version of Press Your Luck from 1987 to 1988 on Seven Network, hosted by Ian Turpie, and also produced by Grundy.
