= Hit Man (American game show) =

American television game show

- Promotional photo featuring the Hit Man set.
- Created by: Jay Wolpert
- Directed by: John "The Fox" Dorsey
- Presented by: Peter Tomarken
- Announcer: Rod Roddy
- Theme music composer: Paul Epstein for Score Productions
- Country of origin: United States
- No. of episodes: 65

Production
- Executive producer: Jay Wolpert
- Producers: Roger Speakman; Randy Neece
- Production locations: NBC Studios; Burbank, California
- Running time: 22 minutes (without commercials)
- Production companies: Jay Wolpert Productions; Metromedia Video Productions

Original release
- Network: NBC
- Release: January 3 – April 1, 1983

Hit Man is an American television game show. The show aired on NBC from January 3 to April 1, 1983, and was hosted by Peter Tomarken. Rod Roddy was the announcer, and the program was produced by Jay Wolpert Productions in association with Metromedia Video Productions.

== Game play ==
Four contestants competed on each episode of Hit Man in a quiz based on memory and instant recall. One was either a returning champion or champion-designate, while the other three were challengers who competed for the right to face him/her in the second round. The winner of each game played the bonus round, known as the Triple Crown, for a top prize of $10,000.

=== Round 1 ===
The three challengers watched a short film narrated by Tomarken. Film topics varied widely and included biographies, behind-the-scenes features about specific movies, professions, hobbies, etc. The film was also shown to the returning champion offstage, since the subject matter would also be used for the Triple Crown.

After the film ended, Tomarken asked the challengers a series of toss-up questions about its content. Each correct answer moved the challenger one step up a five-step ladder behind him/her, while a miss put the question out of play and froze him/her out of the next one. The first challenger to give five correct answers won $300 and sat out the rest of the round, and the second to do so won $200. These two challengers advanced to the second round; the third one was eliminated from the game and received consolation prizes.

=== Round 2 ===
The champion joined the two remaining challengers onstage, and all three contestants were shown a second film and asked a series of toss-up questions about it. The object this time for all three contestants was to defend a series of hit men assigned to them. The champion was given seven hit men, while the winner and runner-up from the first round received four and three respectively.

Each toss-up was played as a head-to-head showdown between the champion and one of the challengers, starting with the winner of the first round. Answering a question correctly caused the opposing contestant to lose a hit man, while answering incorrectly cost the contestant that did so one of their own. In addition, a miss by a challenger ended their turn.

Contestants were eliminated from the round after losing all of their hit men. The champion could win the round by elimiating both challengers, whle either challenger could win by removing the champion's last hit man. The winner of this round took/retained the championship and advanced to play the Triple Crown.

=== Triple Crown ===
A contestant about to start the Triple Crown bonus round.

The champion faced a board of eight columns that contained varying numbers of circles. Two columns each had two, three, and four circles, while one column had one circle and one had five circles. The champion turned his/her back to the board, and the columns were scrambled.

The champion had 60 seconds to answer questions based on the day's two films, without turning to face the board. He/she chose a column, and Tomarken began to ask questions. Each correct answer placed a money man in one circle, but a pass or incorrect answer forced the champion to choose a new one. He/she was never told how many answers were needed to fill a chosen column until it had been successfully filled and/or the end of the round. The champion won $1,000 for each column filled, or $10,000 for filling three.

Champions remained on the show until they were defeated in the second round of the main game or had played the Triple Crown ten times.

== Broadcast history ==
Hit Man premiered on January 3, 1983, as one of three new game shows on NBC's daytime schedule, along with the new Just Men! and a revival of Sale of the Century, that the network commissioned to replace the cancelled serials Texas and The Doctors. Hit Man and its lead-in program, Wheel of Fortune, were moved to the slot Texas had occupied, with Hit Man airing at 11:30 AM Eastern.

Although NBC was drawing better ratings in the hour, Hit Man suffered from ratings trouble against the second half of The Price Is Right on CBS and reruns of The Love Boat on ABC and the network did not renew the series beyond its original sixty-five episode commitment, with the final episode airing on April 1. On the final episode, instead of doing the usual request for contestants during the final segment, announcer Rod Roddy told the home audience, "If you would like to be a contestant on Hit Man, forget it!" The show was replaced by Dream House hosted by Bob Eubanks. Hit Man and Just Men! both ended their runs on the same day, but Sale continued for another six years, ending in 1989.

Peter Tomarken later hosted Press Your Luck, which debuted in September 1983 (five months after Hit Man ended) and ran for three years on CBS. Rod Roddy reunited with Tomarken as the announcer of Press Your Luck, and later became Johnny Olson's permanent replacement in 1986 as announcer on The Price Is Right after the latter's death the previous year. Roddy held this position until his death in 2003.

== International versions ==
Country	Name	Host	Network	Date premiered
Italy	Babilonia	Umberto Smaila	Canale 5	September 18, 1989 – December 30, 1990
United Kingdom	Hitman	Nick Owen	ITV	February 21 – May 30, 1989
