= Press Your Luck =

American game show

- Logo for the 2019 version
- Genre: Game show
- Created by: Bill Carruthers; Jan McCormack
- Directed by: Bill Carruthers; R. Brian DiPirro
- Presented by: Peter Tomarken; Elizabeth Banks
- Voices of: Bill Carruthers; Neil Ross; Chris "Money Fairy" Ahearn; Chris Harrison (Note: Bachelor Whammy voice)
- Announcer: Rod Roddy; Neil Ross; Chris "Money Fairy" Ahearn
- Theme music composer: Lee Ringuette; Tim Mosher & Stoker
- Country of origin: United States
- Original language: English
- No. of seasons: 3 (CBS); 7 (ABC)
- No. of episodes: 761 (CBS); 71 (ABC)

Production
- Executive producers: Bill Carruthers; John Quinn; Jennifer Mullin; Elizabeth Banks; Max Handelman
- Producers: Bill Mitchell; John Quinn
- Animators: Savage Steve Holland; Midnight Sherpa
- Running time: approx. 22 minutes (CBS); approx. 42 minutes (ABC)
- Production companies: The Carruthers Company (1983–1986); Brownstone Productions (2019–present); Fremantle (2019–present)

Original release
- Network: CBS
- Release: September 19, 1983 – September 26, 1986
- Network: ABC
- Release: June 12, 2019 – present

Related
- Second Chance; Whammy! The All-New Press Your Luck

Press Your Luck is an American television game show created by Bill Carruthers and Jan McCormack. Contestants answer trivia questions to earn "spins" on a randomly cycling game board. The board's spaces display cash, prizes, extra spins, special items, or the show's mascot, a cartoon creature known as the Whammy. Landing on a Whammy eliminates any cash and prizes accumulated while also displaying a short comedic animation. Its format is a revival of an earlier Carruthers production, Second Chance, which was hosted by Jim Peck and aired on ABC in 1977. The original version of Press Your Luck aired on CBS between 1983 and 1986. This version featured Peter Tomarken as host, Rod Roddy as announcer, and Carruthers as both director and voice of the Whammy. The original incarnation of the show gained significant media attention in 1984 for a scandal of contestant Michael Larson, who won over $100,000 after memorizing the original pattern of the game board.

Following the show's cancellation by CBS in 1986, it aired frequently in reruns, first on USA Network and then on Game Show Network. Whammy! The All-New Press Your Luck, a revival of the series, aired from 2002 to 2003 also on Game Show Network with Todd Newton as host and Gary Kroeger as announcer. A weekly primetime version (reverting to the name Press Your Luck) began airing on ABC in 2019, with Elizabeth Banks as host. Neil Ross served as both announcer and voice of the Whammy until 2023, when he was replaced in both capacities by Chris "Money Fairy" Ahearn (also of Let's Make a Deal), with The Bachelor host, Chris Harrison, as the voice of the "Bachelor Whammy". Adaptations of Press Your Luck have also aired in other countries such as Australia, the United Kingdom, and Germany, while an adaptation of Whammy! The All-New Press Your Luck also aired in the Philippines. The show has also been adapted into a number of video games for computers and video game consoles.

== Gameplay ==
The Press Your Luck game board from the original CBS version of the show in 1984

Three contestants compete on each episode. Gameplay consists of four rounds: two question rounds and two "big board" rounds.

The Press Your Luck game board, as seen on the ABC version of the show

In a question round, contestants earn spins by correctly answering a series of trivia questions asked by the host. Each question is initially presented as a toss-up open to all; after a contestant buzzes in and answers, the host reads that response and two more to the opponents as a multiple choice selection. Contestants earn three spins for buzzing in and giving the correct answer, and one for choosing it from the three options. If no one buzzes in, the host reads three answers and each contestant can earn one spin by choosing the correct one. There is no penalty for an incorrect answer at any time. However, if a contestant buzzes in and fails to respond, they are frozen out of the question and the host reads three answers to the opponents.

After the question round is completed, the "big board" round begins, with the contestants using their accumulated spins in an attempt to win cash and prizes. The game board consists of 18 spaces laid out in a rectangular loop that is six spaces wide and five high. Each space cycles through two or more items, which can include cash amounts (sometimes with an extra spin), prizes, spaces which offer a change in direction or alteration to score, and the show's mascot, a mischievous red cartoon creature known as the Whammy. A light randomly flashes around the board, encircling one space at a time, and the contestant in control uses a spin by hitting their buzzer to freeze the board and collect whatever is lit at that moment. Landing on a cash or prize space adds its value to the contestant's total, while landing on a Whammy resets the total to zero and plays a short animation involving the Whammy for the viewing audience. Any contestant who lands on the Whammy a total of four times (known as "Whammying out") is immediately eliminated from the game and forfeits all remaining spins. When a prize is hit, a new one is put on the board to replace it.

Specialty spaces on the board include:

- Big Bucks: awards the highest cash amount on the board at the time to the contestant
- Pick a Corner: appears in one corner of the board and allows the contestant to choose one of the items in the other three
- Add a One: adds enough cash to place a one next to the contestant's score as its new leftmost digit (e.g., $500 becoming $1,500)
- Double Your Money + One Spin: adds enough cash to double the contestant's entire score and awards an extra spin
- Money or Lose a Whammy: contestant can either take the displayed cash amount or remove a previously hit Whammy, if any
- Take the Lead + One Spin: awards an extra spin, and adds enough cash to move the contestant into the lead by $1 if they are trailing (2019 revival only)
- The Big 40: awards 40 of a mystery prize or cash amount (introduced in 2023 in conjunction with the series' 40th anniversary; changed to The Big 50 in 2024 to mark 50 episodes of the revival, and Banks’ 50th birthday, awarding 50 prizes)
- Big Banks: Awards a prize from Banks' personal collection; appears during the second Big Board round in 2026

Except for Money or Lose a Whammy, Big Bucks, and Pick a Corner, all of these spaces are removed from play after being hit once.

For the first "big board" round, initial control is awarded to the contestant who has earned the fewest spins in the question round (or is seated farthest away from the host in the event of a tie). If the contestant in control has any spins remaining after stopping the board, they may choose to either spin again or pass those spins to the opponent with the higher score (or the opponent of that contestant's choice in the event of a tie). Passed spins must be played by their recipient, but are converted to earned spins in the event of hitting a Whammy. Play during the "big board" round ends when all accumulated spins have been exhausted or forfeited.

The second half of the game also consists of a question round followed by a "big board" round. Initial control for the latter is given to the contestant with the lowest score, and the cash and prize values are higher than in the first round. Once all spins have been exhausted, the contestant with the highest score becomes the champion and keeps everything they have accumulated, while the other two receive parting gifts. The 1983 version of the program allowed the champion to return for the next day's episode; champions retired after appearing on five consecutive episodes or reaching/exceeding CBS's winnings limit (originally $25,000 before being raised to $50,000), whichever came first. The 2019 version does not feature returning champions but allows the day's champion to play a bonus round.

If two contestants Whammy out and the third has spins remaining, that contestant may play any remaining spins one at a time. The game then ends when the remaining contestant uses up all spins, chooses to stop voluntarily, or hits a fourth Whammy.

=== Bonus Game ===
The 2019 revival features a Bonus Game not present in the original, in which the day's champion plays the "big board" for a chance to win up to $1,000,000. The champion plays through five rounds, taking a set number of spins in each round: five in the first, four in the second, and three in all others. The board displays cash, prizes, directional/specialty spaces, and Whammys as in the main game, and cash/prize values increase from one round to the next. Some prizes are tailored to the champion's particular interests. Landing on a Whammy eliminates all winnings within the bonus round, but main-game winnings are not affected. If the champion ends a round with a bank total greater than zero, they may either end the bonus game at that point and keep all winnings, or continue into the next round with any personalized prizes lost to a Whammy being returned to the board. The game ends immediately upon collecting a fourth Whammy.

The champion wins the entire bank for completing all rounds; however, if the bank reaches or exceeds $500,000 at any point, the game ends and cash is added to increase the champion's final winnings to $1,000,000. Beginning in Season 4, a "Prize-a-Palooza" space appears on the board during the final round, awarding every currently displayed prize if hit. Starting with the 2026 season, a "Pick a Square" space is added to the board for the third through fifth rounds, allowing the contestant to choose any displayed non-Whammy space if hit.

To date, no contestant has won the $1,000,000 top prize in the Bonus Game; Ryan Basch, who won $483,480 during his Bonus Game, is the closest contestant to reach the top prize, falling $16,520 short of reaching the $500,000 target on July 12, 2020. Basch would walk away with a combined total of $565,682 in cash and prizes, which coincidentally also makes him the biggest winner in the history of Press Your Luck.

== History ==
Peter Tomarken, seen here on the set of the May 1983 pilot, was the original host of Press Your Luck.

Press Your Luck is a revival of an earlier game show format created by producer Bill Carruthers, known as Second Chance. This show was hosted by Jim Peck and aired on ABC in 1977. Like Press Your Luck, it also featured contestants answering trivia questions to assume control of a board with cash and prizes. This game board also featured spaces labeled with a devil, who would take away all cash and prizes if the contestant landed on one. Carruthers and Jan McCormack began developing Press Your Luck in 1983.

Peter Tomarken, prior to working in television, was an editor for Women's Wear Daily magazine. His first major television role came earlier in 1983 on the NBC game show Hit Man, and he was chosen to host Press Your Luck after the former was canceled. Press Your Luck began both tapings and airings in September 1983. The show premiered on September 19, 1983, on CBS at 10:30 a.m. ET (9:30 CT/MT/PT), replacing Child's Play. Serving as announcer on the show was Rod Roddy, also the announcer on Hit Man and later known for announcing The Price Is Right. John Harlan and Charlie O'Donnell filled in on a few episodes when Roddy was unavailable. In addition to creating the show, Carruthers served as both director and the voice of the Whammy. The animations featuring this character were created by animator Savage Steve Holland; Carruthers personally selected Holland to design the character and immediately liked Holland's first concept, which Holland had sketched out on a napkin. Holland animated the character via computer software, thus making Press Your Luck one of the first game shows to use computer-designed graphics. Author David Baber noted that the Whammy animations were "popular with the viewers". Some of the animations featured the Whammy taunting the contestant and becoming injured or harmed in a manner which Baber compared to a Wile E. Coyote cartoon. Others featured satires of then-contemporary pop culture figures such as Boy George or Tina Turner. Ed Flesh designed the show's set, and Lee Ringuette composed the show's music.

On January 6, 1986, CBS moved Press Your Luck to a different timeslot in order to make room for a Bob Eubanks-hosted revival of Card Sharks. Press Your Luck replaced Body Language in the network's 4:00 p.m. afternoon time slot. Tomarken stated that by the end of 1985, the contract for The Price Is Right was up for renewal, but CBS was unable to pay Mark Goodson Productions the kind of money they wanted to continue that show on their network. Goodson came up with the solution of taking over the 10:30 a.m. timeslot. The last episode of the CBS version aired on September 26, 1986. The final tapings took place in August of that same year, when its cancellation was first announced. Following the cancellation, Tomarken went on to host other game shows including the syndicated show Wipeout in 1988-89, as well as a number of infomercials. He and his wife both died in 2006 when a private plane he was piloting crashed in Santa Monica Bay.

=== Michael Larson ===
Press Your Luck gained media attention in 1984 for the winnings of a contestant named Michael Larson. A self-described unemployed ice cream truck driver from Lebanon, Ohio, he applied to be on the show that year. By recording episodes at home on a videocassette recorder and playing them back frame-by-frame, Larson discovered that the presumed random patterns of the game board were not actually random and he was able to memorize the sequences. On the single game in which he appeared, an initially tentative Larson spun a Whammy on his very first turn, but then went 45 consecutive spins without hitting another one. The majority of his spins landed on the highest-valued spaces, which offered $3,000, $4,000, or $5,000, all with an extra spin. The game ran for so long that CBS aired the episode in two parts, on June 8 and 11, 1984. In the end, Larson earned a total of $110,237 in cash and prizes.

After an investigation, CBS executives concluded that Larson's memorization of the board patterns did not constitute cheating and allowed him to keep his winnings. The board was then reprogrammed with over 30 new patterns to prevent subsequent contestants from duplicating his feat. In 1994, TV Guide magazine interviewed Larson and revealed the background of this episode including his decision to pass his remaining spins after he lost concentration and missed his target squares. The story was featured in a two-hour documentary on Game Show Network titled Big Bucks: The Press Your Luck Scandal in March 2003, which Tomarken hosted. In July 2010, Michael's brother James, and his former wife at the time of winning, were interviewed for PRI's This American Life for the episode "Million Dollar Idea". His story was also featured on the first episode of Game Show Network's documentary series Cover Story in 2018.

Paul Walter Hauser played Larson in the 2024 film The Luckiest Man in America.

=== Rebroadcasts, syndication, and digital television networks ===
In early 1987, 130 episodes of the show were packaged by Republic Pictures for off-network syndication to a handful of local stations. These episodes originally aired on CBS from February 25 to August 23, 1985, and were also the first to be shown on USA Network from September 14, 1987 to December 30, 1988. Press Your Luck remained on its schedule until October 13, 1995, when USA dropped its game show block altogether.

Game Show Network aired the show from September 2001 to March 2009, airing episodes from February 1984 to November 1985. Game Show Network resumed airing the show in 2012, airing episodes from the September 1983 premiere to February 1984. From 2014 to 2016, Game Show Network aired episodes 561 to 696, which originally ran from November 1985 to May 1986; after this, Game Show Network aired episodes from 1984 to February 1985 until the show was removed from Game Show Network's schedule again in May 2017. From December 2017 to February 2018, Game Show Network aired episodes from 1984 as part of a Saturday night game show block. On July 2, 2018, reruns of Press Your Luck started airing on GameTV in Canada.

=== Whammy! The All-New Press Your Luck ===
On April 15, 2002, Game Show Network debuted a revival titled Whammy! The All-New Press Your Luck (sometimes abbreviated to just Whammy!), with Todd Newton as host and Gary Kroeger as announcer, although Tomarken hosted a pilot episode. This incarnation of the show featured similar gameplay to the original, and was described by Game Show Network executives as being a modern incarnation of the show. One feature unique to this revival was the addition of a "Double Whammy", which would not only remove all cash and prizes accumulated by the contestant, but also subject the contestant to a physical stunt such as having objects drop from the ceiling. Whammy! aired in first-run from April 2002 to December 2003.

=== 2019 revival ===
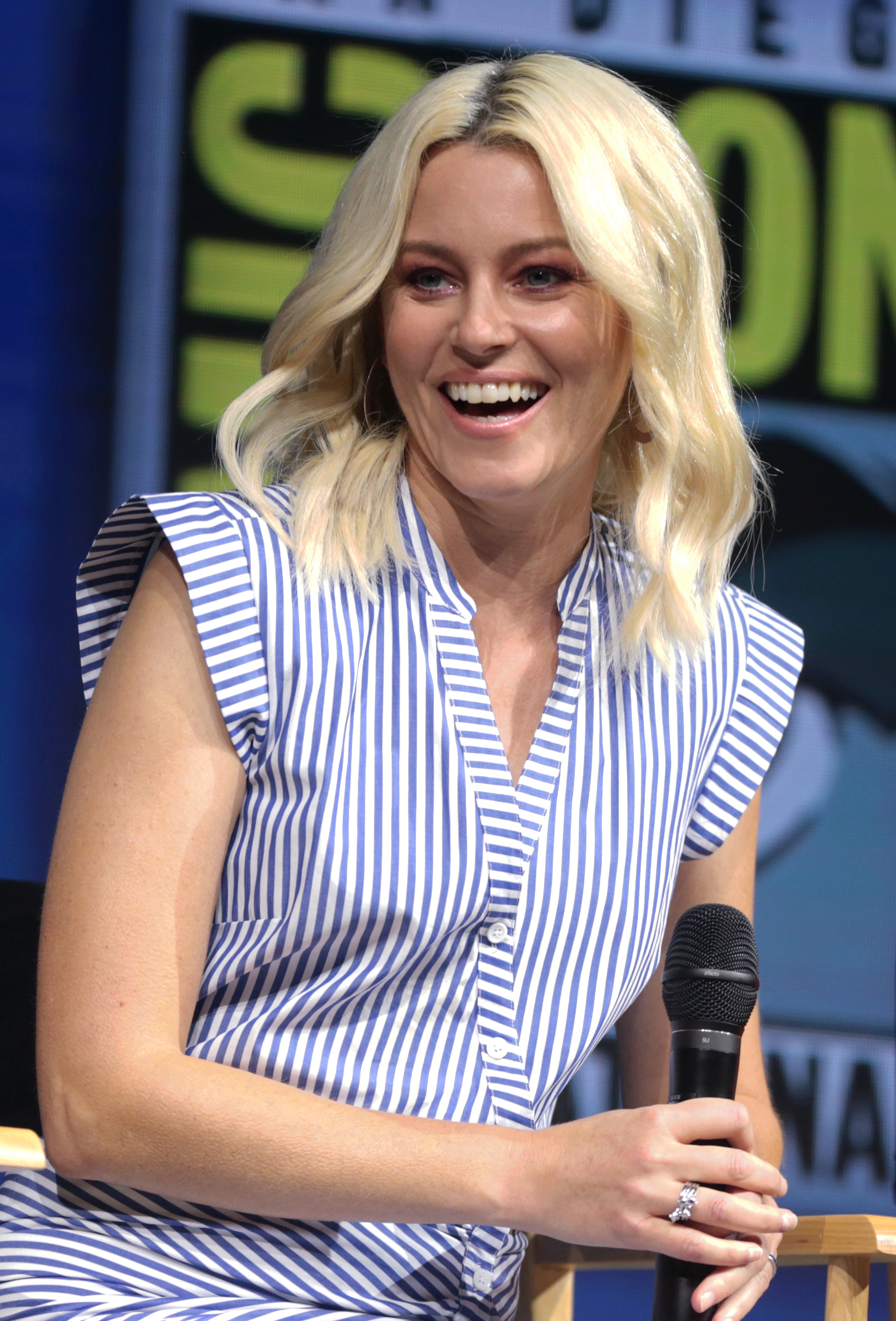
Elizabeth Banks has hosted Press Your Luck since 2019.

On February 21, 2019, a casting announcement was released by Fremantle for a new version of Press Your Luck, advertising opportunities for potential contestants to apply. ABC confirmed in early 2019 that the network was partnering with Fremantle to reboot the series, with pre-production on new hour-long episodes of Press Your Luck and Card Sharks already underway and taping slated to begin sometime in the first portion of the year. John Quinn (a producer on Celebrity Name Game) is the executive producer. Actress Elizabeth Banks was selected to host. Neil Ross was the announcer and the voice of the Whammy for the first four seasons of the ABC version, with Chris Ahearn (also known as the "Money Fairy" on the current version of Let's Make a Deal) assuming both roles beginning in season five, while the Whammy animations featuring Ross continue to be used. Chris Harrison, who hosted The Bachelor franchise at the time, was the voice of the "Bachelor Whammy".

The series premiered on June 12, 2019 following an early premiere the day before. The first season featured eight weekly hour-long episodes. ABC confirmed in mid-2023 that, despite the 2023 Writers Guild of America strike, the show's fifth season would premiere in late 2023 as intended. A sixth season was announced in May 2024, which premiered on July 18. On April 30, 2025, it was announced that new episodes from the sixth season would premiere on July 10, 2025.

On March 4, 2026, it was announced through a casting call that the series was renewed for a seventh season; on May 8, 2026, it was officially announced that Press Your Luck had been renewed for a seventh season, which premiered on July 9, 2026.

== Production ==
The CBS version and the first six seasons of the ABC version were taped at CBS Television City in Los Angeles. The seventh season was taped at the Trilith Studios, Trilith Live in Fayetteville, Georgia.

== International versions ==
Since its inception, Press Your Luck has also been adapted internationally. An Australian version, with Ian Turpie as host and John Deeks as announcer, aired on Seven Network from 1987 to 1988. Grundy Worldwide packaged this version, with Bill Mason as executive producer. A German version entitled Glück am Drücker ("Good Luck on the Trigger") aired on RTLplus in 1992 with Al Munteanu as host. It had an animated vulture named "Raffi" steal cash and prizes from contestants instead of Whammys. Another remake, Drück Dein Glück ("Push Your Luck"), aired daily in 1999 on RTL II with Guido Kellerman as host; this show's mascot was an animated shark. In the United Kingdom, an ITV version ran in the HTV West region, with Paul Coia as host from 1991 until 1992. Whammy! The All-New Press Your Luck was also adapted in the Philippines as Whammy! Push Your Luck on GMA Network from 2007 to 2008. It was hosted by Paolo Bediones and Rufa Mae Quinto.

== Merchandise ==
In 1988, GameTek released a home computer game of Press Your Luck for IBM PC compatibles and the Commodore 64. Ludia Inc. (now part of RTL Group, which owns the show franchise) along with Ubisoft released an adaptation called Press Your Luck: 2010 Edition on October 27, 2009 for PC, iPhone, iPad, iPod Touch, Nintendo DS, and Wii. Prior to this, on August 24, 2010, the game was released for the PlayStation 3 (via PSN) as part of the Game Show Party bundle pack (PS3 only) that also included Family Feud: 2010 Edition and The Price Is Right: 2010 Edition, and on PlayStation 3's PSN download service from August 24, 2010.

A video game adaption of the show titled Press Your Luck 2010 Edition was released in the U.S. on multiple home consoles and with a PC version. Actor Terry McGovern is the off-screen host. In January 2012, an app developed by former Fremantle subsidiary Ludia and based on Press Your Luck debuted on Facebook. Ten contestants compete in a single-question round together, all answering the same multiple-choice questions. There are six questions in total, each worth between $500 and $1,000, or a Whammy. A correct answer earns the question's value multiplied by the number of contestants who answered incorrectly or ran out of time (e.g., answering the $500 question correctly with three other contestants answering incorrectly earns $1,500). Bonus cash is given to the three contestants who answer the questions correctly in the shortest amount of time. Answering the Whammy question incorrectly causes the contestant to lose any money accumulated to that point. In September 2012, Ludia released Press Your Luck Slots on Facebook.
