= Rod Roddy =

American radio and television announcer (1937–2003)

- Roddy on the 32nd season premiere of The Price Is Right in 2003
- Born: Robert Ray Roddy; September 28, 1937; Fort Worth, Texas, U.S.
- Died: October 27, 2003 (aged 66); Los Angeles, California, U.S.
- Resting place: Greenwood Memorial Park (Fort Worth, Texas); 32.76205°N 97.36848°W
- Other name: Rod Ray Roddy
- Education: Texas Christian University
- Occupations: Announcer; television personality; actor; comedian
- Years active: 1959–2003

Robert Ray "Rod" Roddy (September 28, 1937 – October 27, 2003) was an American radio and television announcer. He was primarily known for his role as an offstage announcer on game shows. Among the shows that Roddy announced are the CBS game shows Whew!, Press Your Luck and The Price Is Right. Roddy is widely recognized by the signature line, "Come on down!" from The Price Is Right, and it appears on his grave marker, although the phrase was originated and made popular by his predecessor Johnny Olson. Roddy succeeded original announcer Olson on The Price Is Right and held the role from 1986 until his death in 2003, and as of 2026, is the longest-serving announcer on the current incarnation of the show. On many episodes of Press Your Luck and The Price Is Right, Roddy appeared on camera. He was also the voice of Mike the microphone on Disney's House of Mouse from 2001 until his death in 2003.

== Early career ==
After graduating from Texas Christian University (TCU), Roddy began his professional broadcasting career as a disc jockey and talk show host on KLIF and KNUS-FM (now KSPF) in Dallas, Texas. He also worked overnights and mid-days at the Buffalo, New York, radio station WKBW-AM (now WWKB), a clear channel radio station covering the Eastern Seaboard of the United States, and at other high-profile stations. Returning to KLIF and KNUS during the 1970s, Roddy hosted a call-in program, Rod Roddy's Hotline, and became a frequent target of death threats. He conducted a long-running on-air feud with an elderly woman (dubbed "Granny Hate" by an earlier host), who claimed to represent the local Ku Klux Klan.

Roddy announced the sitcom Soap from 1977 to 1981, where he provided the opening and closing narration: "Confused? You won't be after this week's episode of Soap!" Roddy replaced Casey Kasem, who quit the series after the pilot due to the show's content. Roddy's first work as a game show announcer was on Whew!, which aired from 1979 to 1980. From there, he went on to announce several other game shows, including Battlestars (1981–1982), Love Connection (1983–1985, 1986), Hit Man (1983) and Press Your Luck (1983–1986). He also worked as a substitute announcer on Family Feud, Card Sharks and $25,000 Pyramid. He was the guest announcer for two weeks on the Tom Bergeron version of Hollywood Squares that featured game show hosts and panelists as the celebrities. Roddy also voiced a number of national television commercials, including those for Pennzoil and Public Storage.

== The Price Is Right ==
After Goodson-Todman announcer Johnny Olson died in October 1985, Roddy was chosen as one of several substitute announcers (along with Rich Jeffries, Bob Hilton, and Gene Wood) to announce The Price Is Right. According to former producer Roger Dobkowitz, both he and CBS liked Roddy the best. Despite only announcing for six episodes (the least of the four), on February 17, 1986, Roddy was announced as the show's regular announcer. He was also the announcer on Tom Kennedy's nighttime The Price Is Right after Olson's death.

Overweight for much of his adult life, Roddy later adopted a rigorous diet and exercise program which resulted in a loss of close to 200 pounds. With his weight-loss regimen becoming a much-lauded success (frequently being mentioned by Bob Barker), Roddy was frequently shown on-camera, at least once per show, usually before the final one bid while he announced "the next contestant on The Price Is Right", and was occasionally featured in Showcase skits aiding the "Barker's Beauties", similar to Olson's frequent on-camera appearances.

Roddy was also noted for wearing brightly colored and sequined sport jackets, a practice he first adopted as a trademark when making personal appearances emceeing teen dances and concerts for WKBW in Buffalo in the 1960s. On The Price Is Right, Roddy first wore vivid pastel jackets made in Hong Kong, to contrast with Barker's "dapper" fashion sense. With the encouragement of Barker, he turned them into a staple of the show and traveled to Thailand several times a year to have the suits custom-made in colorful Thai silk. Roddy would also frequently travel to Thailand as the official ambassador to Chiang Mai.

== Illness and death ==
On September 11, 2001, Roddy was diagnosed with colon cancer, and took a leave of absence to undergo and recover from surgery and chemotherapy, and he returned a month later (though the shows that were taped during his absence did not air until after Roddy returned to work). A year later, the cancer returned, and Roddy temporarily took another leave of absence to undergo and recover from surgery on September 20, 2002. Again, he recovered within a month (though once again the shows that were taped during his absence did not air until after Roddy returned to work). In April 2003, Roddy was diagnosed with male breast cancer. He underwent surgery and afterwards, experienced major complications. As a result, Roddy was unable to announce for The Price Is Right for the rest of Season 31. The diagnoses led to Roddy becoming a spokesperson for early detection of cancer in his last years. In an interview with CBS, Roddy commented to the general public:

I could have prevented all this with a colonoscopy, and of course, that's the campaign I've been on since I had the first surgery. To everybody out there, get a mammogram! It can happen to men, too.

Roddy continued to announce for The Price Is Right until his last hospitalization two months before his death on October 27, 2003, at the age of 66. After his departure from the show, Burton Richardson and Randy West filled-in. Roddy was replaced by Rich Fields in April 2004. Roddy's final episode aired on October 20, 2003, one week before his death. Roddy is interred at Fort Worth's Greenwood Memorial Park. He had "Come on Down" inscribed on his tombstone, a phrase popularized by Johnny Olson.

Roddy was given a short tribute recorded shortly afterwards as a segment that lasted eighteen seconds, narrated by Barker, which aired before the start of a later episode:

As many of you know, we have lost our dear friend, Rod Roddy. Rod's many television friends and all of us associated with The Price Is Right will miss his splendid talent and his great sense of humor. May God bless Rod.

— Bob Barker

Following Barker's tribute is a message saying In Loving Memory of ROD RODDY 1937-2003. Craig Kilborn, then in his final season as host of The Late Late Show, paid tribute to Roddy (a frequent guest and friend of Kilborn's) in a lengthy clip montage to end the October 28, 2003, show.

In a similar manner to the 18-second tribute, Roddy is mentioned a single time in Barker's autobiography, Priceless Memories, when Barker lists the series' announcers since 1972. However, Barker did speak of Roddy at length for an interview with CBS Radio the day after his death, including a mention of visiting him in the hospital several days before his death.
