= Bill Carruthers =

American television executive (1930–2003)

- Born: William H. Carruthers; September 27, 1930; Detroit, Michigan, U.S.
- Died: March 2, 2003 (aged 72); Burbank, California, U.S.
- Occupations: Television executive, television director, television producer

William H. Carruthers (September 27, 1930 – March 2, 2003) was an American television executive who gained his first fame as the director of The Soupy Sales Show at Detroit television station WXYZ-TV. He also directed the Ernie Kovacs-helmed game show, Take a Good Look, for ABC from 1959 to 1961.

== Biography ==
Carruthers was born in Detroit, Michigan. He served in the Air Force for four years, and after serving, he took up a job at WXYZ-TV, the ABC affiliate in Detroit which was owned-and-operated by the network at that time. One day, he showed up to the station to work when he was told at the last minute, the regular director was unable to direct The Soupy Sales Show, he stepped in to direct the show. He was named the permanent director, and moved with his family to Los Angeles in 1959 upon the show becoming nationally distributed.

Carruthers went on to be the director on The Newlywed Game and The Dating Game before starting his own production company in 1968. His company, The William Carruthers Company, produced the ABC country music series The Johnny Cash Show in 1969 with his partner Joel Stein for Screen Gems. He also produced and directed game shows including Give-n-Take, The Neighbors, Second Chance (all with Warner Bros. Television, as part of a deal it signed in 1975), Lee Trevino's Golf for Swingers (with advertising agency McCann Erickson) and the 1975 version of You Don't Say! (with Ralph Andrews Productions and Warner Bros. Television), as well as the original producer and director for the children's series New Zoo Revue, before hitting it big with the CBS game show, Press Your Luck (which was a retooling of the earlier Second Chance), which ran from 1983–86. He was the voice for the multiple Whammy animations on the show.

As a television consultant, Carruthers guided the Nixon, Ford, Reagan and George H. W. Bush administrations on effective use of the media.

In the 1990s, he produced specials for The Family Channel, called Marry Me, as well as a short-lived game show for ESPN, Designated Hitter.

He suffered a stroke on set in 1996, resulting in his retirement; he died from heart failure in 2003. Two weeks after his death, Game Show Network aired a documentary called Big Bucks: The Press Your Luck Scandal about a contestant on the Carruthers co-created Press Your Luck named Michael Larson. The documentary detailed how Larson created a method that allowed him to win a record-breaking sum of over $100,000 on the game show. Carruthers was interviewed for the program, which marked his last appearance before his death. The original airing of the documentary was dedicated in his memory. Today, the rights to the Press Your Luck format are owned by the British multi-national media company Fremantle; Carruthers sold the format to Pearson Television, Fremantle's predecessor company after his retirement.
