= Stefan Hatos-Monty Hall Productions =

Television production company

Stefan Hatos-Monty Hall Productions is a television production company responsible for producing several American game shows in the 1970s and 1980s. The company is best known for its hit series Let's Make a Deal, which aired in several company-produced iterations off and on between 1963 and 1986.

The company disbanded sometime in 1987, but the company exists as a holding company for all Hatos-Hall assets. It is currently owned by Glass Entertainment Group owned by Nancy Glass.

== History: Let's Make a Deal ==
Prior to meeting and while working in 1962 on the NBC game show Your First Impression, hosted by Bill Leyden, Stefan Hatos and Monty Hall had different career paths. Hatos was a writer and producer who had worked in both television and radio and had also been a producer for Bob Hope's early television specials. Hall's American media career began in 1955 when he became a contributor for the NBC Radio Monitor program. After five years of this, he moved to Hollywood and became the host of the Merrill Heatter-produced Video Village. While hosting the series in 1962, he sold his first production (the aforementioned Your First Impression) to NBC and met Hatos, who was working on the show as a producer (Hall was executive producer).

The next year, the duo debuted the long-running Let's Make a Deal on NBC, and the show was an instant success, running in daytime on NBC and later on ABC for 13 seasons. Two weekly network primetime versions also aired, one on NBC in 1967 and one on ABC from 1969 to 1971.

The show's popularity also spawned a syndicated version, which aired weekly from 1971 to 1977 and was one of the first network game shows to do so.

== Other shows ==
In addition to LMAD, Stefan Hatos-Monty Hall Productions also produced the 1970s hit Split Second for ABC. The series, which ran from 1972 to 1975, was the only other show the company produced that lasted more than one season.

Other game shows produced by the team included Chain Letter, Three for the Money and It's Anybody's Guess for NBC and It Pays to Be Ignorant and Masquerade Party in syndication. The last of those series was the hosting debut for Richard Dawson.

== The 1980s ==
After a hiatus of several years, Stefan Hatos-Monty Hall Productions returned to production in the mid-1980s with a revival of Let's Make A Deal, which ran in daily syndication from 1984 to 1986. (Another daily syndicated version, which aired from 1980 to 1981, while hosted by Hall was not produced with Hatos.) After that series ended its run, Hatos and Hall revived Split Second in syndication in the fall of 1986 with Hall hosting. The company broke up following the show's cancellation.

== Afterwards ==
Although Hatos retired from writing and producing television shows after Split Second ended in 1987, he continued to oversee the licensing agreements and was involved with the foreign versions of Let's Make a Deal until his death in 1999.

Hall was retired for the most part following the 1987 cancellation of Split Second, returning only once to regular hosting as he replaced Bob Hilton as the host of a daytime revival of Let's Make a Deal for its original home, NBC; Hall did not have a production stake in this series, which was produced by Ron Greenberg and Dick Clark. Hall continued to make cameo appearances related to his creation from time to time, such as one he made as part of Good Morning America's 2009 Game Show Week and another in the 2003 NBC primetime version of the show, which was produced by Monty Hall Enterprises.

For the 2009 CBS daytime series, Hall served as a consultant and Stefan Hatos-Monty Hall Productions is credited as a co-production company (much in the same way Mark Goodson's name was used on The Price Is Right long after his production company was dissolved and folded into Fremantle in 2002). Hall has also hosted at least one game on the current version. Hall died in 2017 and the family is still involved in the production company with its current owners.

In 2021, the holding company was acquired by Marcus/Glass Entertainment, a joint venture of Nancy Glass and Marcus Lemonis, with Sharon Hall Kessler, a former Endemol Shine executive, as consultant. Kessler is Monty and Marilyn Hall's daughter.
