= Chain Letter (American game show) =

- Created by: Stefan Hatos; Monty Hall
- Presented by: Jan Murray
- Announcer: Wendell Niles
- Country of origin: United States

Production
- Production locations: NBC Studios, Burbank, California
- Running time: 22–24 minutes

Original release
- Network: NBC
- Release: July 4 – October 14, 1966

Chain Letter is an American game show produced by Stefan Hatos-Monty Hall Productions that aired on NBC during the summer and early-fall of 1966. Jan Murray hosted this game show, while Wendell Niles did the announcing.

== Game play ==
=== Main round ===
Two teams, each with one celebrity (team captain), and a studio contestant, competed against each other.

A category was stated such as "Items you might find in a lady's handbag" or "Gifts for the boss's birthday". The first player would have ten seconds to give a word pertaining to the category. Then, the next player would have ten seconds to give another word in the same category using the last letter of the previous word as the first letter of the new word. Each player alternated giving answers until a bad answer was given or their guessing time ran out causing the chain to be broken. The team earned one point for each acceptable answer with the opposing team earning one bonus point when the chain was broken and control of the next category.

At the end of a three-minute game, the team with the most points wins the game, a $100 bonus, and the right to play the bonus round.

=== Bonus round ===
The championship team was given a chain word and the players alternated forming words in a similar manner from that word. The contestant player earned $20 for each acceptable word until the chain was broken.

== Pilots ==
=== Three of a Kind ===
The first pilot was developed under the title "Three of a Kind" and taped in January, 1964, with CBS Sports correspondent Jack Whitaker as emcee and co-creator/producer Monty Hall as announcer. The game was played similarly but with three players, one celebrity and two "occupationally themed" contestants, competing against each other in a two round format.

The first round featured three categories and the opposing team's choice of category for the controlling team. The last category was not played. Each acceptable response was worth $10 and each team member alternated giving responses, with no last letter-first letter restriction, until they could not give any more.

The second round played with the eventual "Chain Letter" rules but with $20 for each acceptable word. There was no bonus game.

=== 1964 pilot ===
The second pilot and the first with the "Chain Letter" name was taped in December 1964; with Dennis James as emcee. This game was played with four civilian contestants alternating. Each player naming items pertaining to a category at $5 per acceptable item. Each player who gave the most acceptable responses in a round also earned $25–$100 bonuses per round. Five rounds were played, each with a different category.

== Episode status ==
The series is presumed to be destroyed due to network practices. Only the December 1964 pilot and the premiere exist, the latter of which is in color.
