= Musical chairs (disambiguation) =

Musical chairs is a children's game.

Musical Chairs may also refer to:

- Musical Chairs (1955 game show), a 1955 NBC game show hosted by Bill Leyden
- Musical Chairs (1975 game show), a 1975 CBS game show hosted by Adam Wade
- Musical Chairs (film), a 2011 film directed by Susan Seidelman
- Musical Chairs (Sammy Hagar album), 1977
- Musical Chairs (Hootie & the Blowfish album), 1998
- Musical Chairs (musical), a 1980 Broadway show starring Grace Keagy
- "Musical Chairs" (Smash), an episode of the American television series Smash
- "Musical Chairs", a season 6 episode of The Loud House
