= It Could Be You =

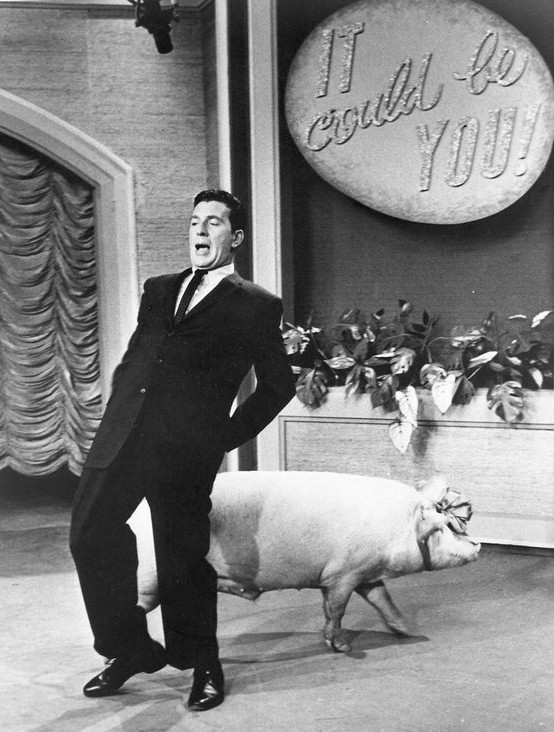
- Bill Leyden in 1961.
- Genre: Game Show
- Presented by: Bill Leyden
- Announcer: Wendell Niles
- Country of origin: United States
- Original language: English

Production
- Producers: Ralph Edwards; Stefan Hatos
- Running time: 30 minutes

Original release
- Network: NBC
- Release: June 4, 1956 – December 29, 1961

It Could Be You is a television game show produced by Ralph Edwards Productions in the late 1950s in the United States, broadcast daily in the weekday daytime schedule for five years 1956–1961, and weekly in the evening on-and-off over three years 1958–1961. Bill Leyden was the host, and Wendell Niles was the announcer.

== Details ==
It Could Be You used a variation of the format made famous in another popular show of the time, Queen for a Day, where a woman who had gone through many hardships in her life was selected and awarded prizes. However, It Could Be You, though still awarding prizes, focused most often on a woman's more embarrassing moments — for example: being seen by a neighbor while getting out of a bathtub, or engaging in a romantic interlude with a boyfriend while parked next to a bus full of tourists. Sometimes, the contestant had to perform a stunt or activity to claim the prize. The title of the series was part of the show, in that the woman called to the stage was from a studio audience which had been told ... "It Could Be You".

Prizes were often more humorous than useful — a woman who complained about moving from city to city so much that she could never get used to her new bathtub received a bathtub on wheels. At times, though, the producers of the show were much more sensitive, bringing about reunions of relatives long thought dead, or re-uniting families torn apart by the Iron Curtain.

Guest celebrities would sometimes appear to aid the host. Among those appearing were:

- Lex Barker
- Annette Funicello
- Steve McQueen

NBC broadcast both a daily weekday daytime version (1956 through 1961), and a weekly primetime evening version that appeared on various days at various times over the summer of 1958, within the 1958-59 and 1959-60 television seasons, and over the summer of 1961. The show was produced from Studio D of NBC Radio City in Hollywood and later from Studio 1 of the NBC Studios in Burbank, California.

The producer of the show was Stefan Hatos, best known for his later collaboration with Monty Hall on the famous 1960s and 1970s TV game show Let's Make A Deal.

== Daytime schedule ==
The daily daytime version of the show premiered June 4, 1956 on the NBC daytime schedule in the 12:30–1 PM (EST) timeslot, and continued every weekday at that time through December 30, 1961.

== Prime time schedule ==
The primetime evening version of the show was also broadcast by NBC.

=== Summer 1958 ===
The weekly evening version of the show premiered July 2, 1958, in the 10:00–10:30 PM (EST) timeslot on Wednesday nights, where it continued until September 1958.

=== 1958–59 season ===
The weekly evening show began again in November 1958 in a new timeslot, 8:30–9:00 PM (EST) on Thursday nights, and continued there until the end of March 1959. The evening show was not broadcast in the summer of 1959.

=== 1959–60 season ===
In September 1959, the weekly evening show appeared in another new timeslot, 10:30–11:00 PM (EST) on Saturday nights, until January 1960. The evening show was not broadcast in the summer of 1960.

=== 1960–61 season ===
The evening show did not appear within the 1960–61 season.

=== Summer 1961 ===
The evening show began again June 1961 in a fourth timeslot, 10:00–10:30 PM (EST) on Wednesday nights. The last prime time show was broadcast September 27, 1961.

== Critical reception ==
Although the viewing public enjoyed the show and appreciated host Bill Leyden's quick wit, critics of daytime television found fault with what they called the patronizing and condescending behavior the host had toward the women brought on stage.
