= Dick Enberg =

American sportscaster (1935–2017)

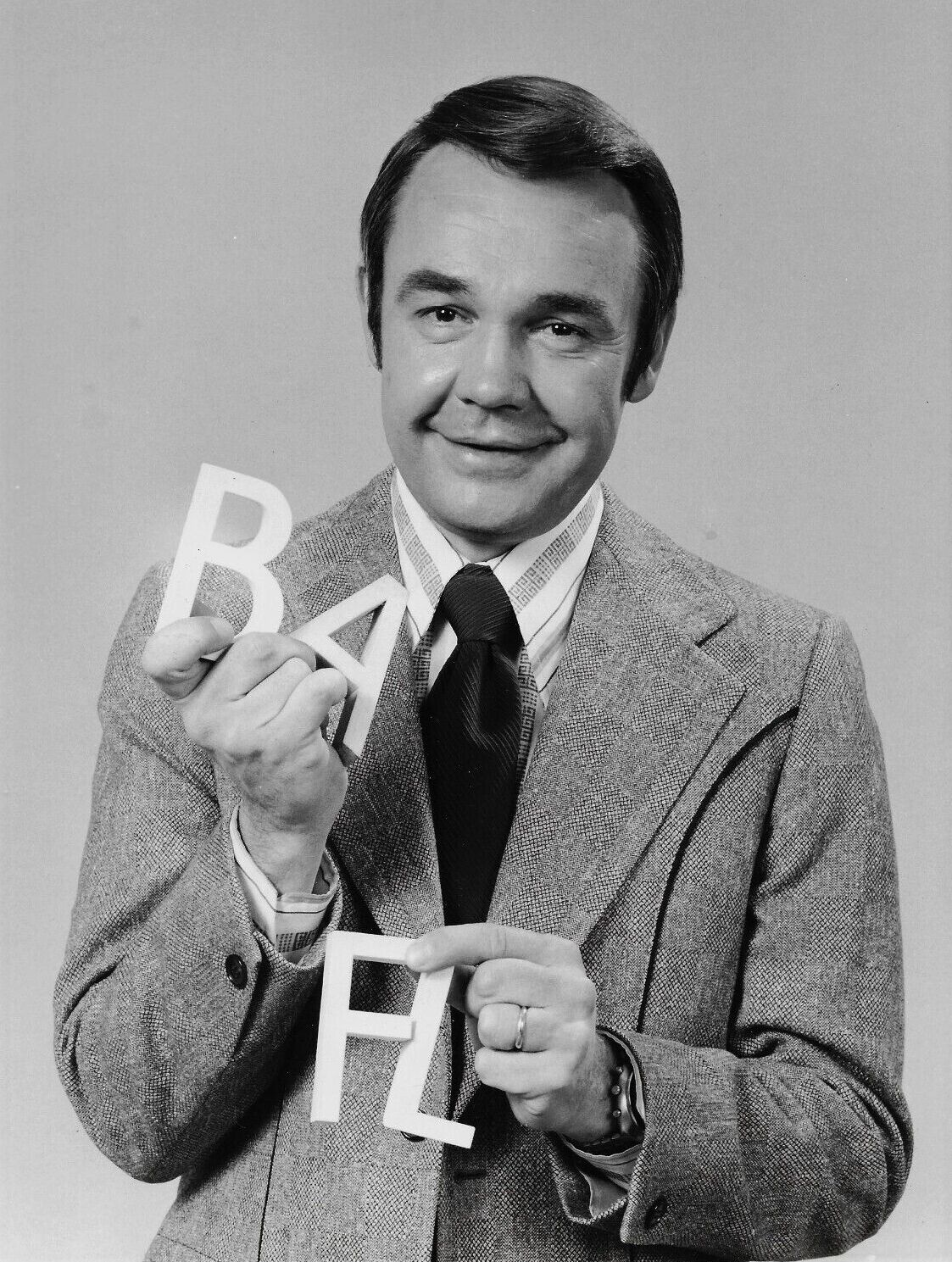
- Enberg, c. 1973 in a promotional photo for the game show Baffle
- Born: Richard Alan Enberg; January 9, 1935; Mount Clemens, Michigan, U.S.
- Died: December 21, 2017 (aged 82); La Jolla, California, U.S.
- Education: Central Michigan University; Indiana University
- Occupation: Sportscaster
- Years active: 1960–2016
- Spouses: Jeri Taylor (m. 1959; div. 1973); Barbara Hedbring (m. 1983)
- Children: 6; Including Alex
- Parent(s): Arnie and Belle Enberg
- Sports commentary career
- Teams: UCLA Bruins men's basketball (1966–77); Los Angeles Rams (1966–77); California Angels (1969–78, 1985); San Diego Padres (2010–16)
- Genre: Play-by-play
- Sports: American football, baseball, basketball, tennis, golf, boxing, gymnastics, Horse Racing
- Employer: NBC Sports (1975–99); CBS Sports (2000–11, 2014); ESPN (2004–11)

Richard Alan Enberg (January 9, 1935 – December 21, 2017) was an American sportscaster. Over the course of an approximately 60-year career, he provided play-by-play of various sports for several radio and television networks, including NBC (1975–1999), CBS (2000–2014), and ESPN (2004–2011), as well as for individual teams, such as UCLA Bruins basketball, Los Angeles Rams football, and California Angels and San Diego Padres baseball.

Enberg was well known for his signature on-air catchphrases "Touch 'em all" (for home runs) and "Oh, my!" (for particularly exciting and outstanding athletic plays). He also announced or hosted the Tournament of Roses Parade for many years, sometimes with the help of family members. Enberg retired from broadcasting in 2016, after seven seasons as the Padres' primary television announcer.

== Early life and education ==
Enberg was born on January 9, 1935, in Mount Clemens, Michigan, as the first child to Belle Elizabeth (Weiss) and Arnie Enberg. His paternal grandparents were Finnish immigrants, whose original name was Katajavuori, which means juniper mountain. Before they lived in America, they changed their name to the Swedish-sounding Enberg. His mother was of English, French, German and Native American descent. He had a younger brother, Dennis. Enberg's family first moved to Bridgeport, Connecticut, when he was two years old, then to southern California in 1940 for several years, and then back to a farm near Armada, Michigan.

Following high school in Armada, Enberg attended Central Michigan University, where he played college baseball and earned a bachelor's degree in 1957. In his senior year at Central Michigan, Enberg was elected president of the student body. During this time, he was employed at WSAM in Saginaw, Michigan, then a Detroit Tigers radio affiliate. Enberg then went on to graduate school at Indiana University Bloomington, where he earned master's and doctorate degrees in health sciences. While at Indiana, Enberg voiced the first radio broadcast of the Little 500, the bicycle racing event popularized in the film Breaking Away.

He was also the play-by-play announcer for Indiana Hoosiers football and basketball games and in 1961 called his first NCAA basketball tournament event, the championship game between Cincinnati and Ohio State. From 1961 to 1965, he was an assistant professor and baseball coach at Cal State Northridge, then known as San Fernando Valley State College. Enberg was also a member of the Phi Sigma Kappa fraternity.

== Career in Los Angeles ==
In the late 1960s, Enberg began a full-time sportscasting career in Los Angeles, working for KTLA television (anchoring a nightly sports report and calling UCLA Bruins basketball) and KMPC radio (calling Los Angeles Rams football and California Angels baseball). After every Angels victory, he would wrap up his broadcast with "And the halo shines tonight" in reference to the "Big A" scoreboard at Anaheim Stadium and the halo at the top, which would light up for everyone in the area to see, particularly from the adjacent freeway. Enberg was named California Sportscaster of the Year four times during this period.

In the 1960s, Enberg announced boxing matches at L.A.'s Olympic Auditorium. Enberg also presided over the Trophy presentation for Super Bowl VII in 1973.

In 1968, Enberg was recommended by UCLA athletic director J.D. Morgan to be the national broadcaster for the syndicated TVS Television Network to cover the "Game of the Century" between the Houston Cougars, led by Elvin Hayes, and the UCLA Bruins, led by Lew Alcindor (later Kareem Abdul-Jabbar).

In the 1970s, Enberg called the 1979 NCAA Championship game between Michigan State, led by Magic Johnson, and Indiana State, led by Larry Bird. He also hosted the syndicated television game show Sports Challenge and co-produced the Emmy Award-winning sports-history series The Way It Was for PBS.

== NBC Sports (1975–1999) ==
In 1973, Enberg hosted the game show Baffle, which lasted just a year before being cancelled in 1974. A year later, producer Monty Hall hired Enberg to host the shorter-lived Three for the Money.

In 1975, Enberg joined NBC Sports. For the next 25 years, he broadcast a plethora of sports and events for NBC, including the National Football League, Major League Baseball, the National Basketball Association, the U.S. Open golf championship, college football, college basketball, the Wimbledon and French Open tennis tournaments, heavyweight boxing, Breeders' Cup and other horse racing events, and the Olympic Games.

Enberg replaced Curt Gowdy as lead play-by-play announcer for the NFL on NBC in 1979, and on the network's telecast of the Rose Bowl in January 1980. He was in the booth in Pasadena for nine straight years, until ABC took over the broadcast in 1989.

=== The NFL on NBC ===
While on The NFL on NBC, Enberg called eight Super Bowls (alongside such former NFL players Merlin Olsen, Bob Trumpy, Phil Simms, and Paul Maguire), the last being Super Bowl XXXII in January 1998. Enberg also anchored NBC's coverage of Super Bowl XIII (called by Curt Gowdy) in 1979. He also called three Canadian Football League games in 1982 during the NFL strike.

Among the notable games called by Enberg was the 1986 Week 3 51–45 shootout between the New York Jets and Miami Dolphins and the 1987 AFC Championship Game between the Denver Broncos and Cleveland Browns.

Well, and so the end of the 1997 NFL season and for NBC Sports, Super Bowl XXXII is the end of our 32 years covering AFL, NFL action. NBC's been there from the start, from Joe Namath all the way to John Elway, from Curt Gowdy to those of us who had the honor of calling this game tonight, and on behalf of all of our crew, all the men and women who have brought you the sights and sounds of NFL football here on NBC since 1960, we want to thank you for your effort, and those of you who have watched, and we congratulate the Super Bowl champions. The underdogs have won. The 13 years of defeat have been erased at least for tonight as Denver wins it, 31–24. Don't wander away, more to come from San Diego. Greg Gumbel will be back after station identification. Denver Broncos are Super Bowl champs.

— Dick Enberg at the end of Super Bowl XXXII, NBC's final NFL telecast until the 2006 season.

=== Major League Baseball on NBC ===
In 1977, Enberg provided play-by-play for Game 2 of the American League Championship Series and Game 4 of the National League Championship Series Series alongside Don Drysdale. Two years later, Enberg teamed with Wes Parker and Sparky Anderson to call the ALCS for NBC. And then in 1981, Enberg alongside Tom Seaver, called the National League Division Series between the Montreal Expos and Philadelphia Phillies and then, the NLCS between Montreal and the Los Angeles Dodgers.

According to his autobiography, Oh My!, Enberg was informed by NBC that he would become the lead play-by-play voice of Major League Baseball Game of the Week beginning with the 1982 World Series (for which he served as pregame host and shared play-by-play duties with Joe Garagiola alongside analyst Tony Kubek) and through subsequent regular seasons. He wrote that on his football trips, he would read every Sporting News to make sure he was current with all the baseball news and notes. Then he met with NBC executives in September 1982, and they informed him that Vin Scully was in negotiations to be their lead baseball play-by-play man (teaming with Garagiola while Kubek would team with Bob Costas) and would begin with NBC in the spring of 1983.

According to the book, Enberg wasn't pleased about the decision (since he loved being the California Angels' radio and television voice in the 1970s and was eager to return to baseball) but the fact that NBC was bringing in Scully, arguably baseball's best announcer, was understandable. Enberg added that NBC also gave him a significant pay increase as a pseudo-apology for not coming through on the promise to make him the lead baseball play-by-play man. Enberg returned to the Angels' radio booth to call 40 games in 1985, citing a desire to reconnect with the sport, which he has described as having been "in my DNA since I was in diapers".

Enberg hosted NBC's pregame shows of the 1985 National League Championship Series with Joe Morgan. It was Enberg who broke the news to most of the nation that Vince Coleman was injured before Game 4. NBC even aired an interview with one of the few people who actually saw the incident, a Dodger batboy. Enberg was also in Toronto to do the pregame for Games 1 and 7 of the 1985 American League Championship Series alongside Rick Dempsey (who was still active with Baltimore at the time).

NBC planned to use Enberg as one of its announcers for The Baseball Network coverage in 1994, but the players' strike that year ended the season before he had the opportunity to call any games.

=== Wimbledon Championships ===
As NBC's voice of the Wimbledon Tennis Championships, the last tournament for him being in 1999 (alongside Bud Collins and, later, John McEnroe), Enberg regularly concluded NBC's coverage of the two-week event with thematically appropriate observations accompanied by a montage of video clips.

== CBS Sports (2000–2014) ==
Enberg was hired by CBS Sports in 2000, serving as a play-by-play announcer for CBS's NFL, college basketball, and US Open Tennis coverage. For several years he also contributed to CBS's coverage of The Masters and PGA Championship golf as an interviewer and essayist.

Enberg during his tenure at CBS, was notably on the call alongside Dan Dierdorf for an NFL game between the New England Patriots and New York Jets on September 23, 2001. It was during this game that New York linebacker Mo Lewis injured the Patriots' starting quarterback Drew Bledsoe. Bledsoe's injury resulted in Tom Brady becoming New England's quarterback, beginning the Brady–Belichick era for the Patriots that saw them enjoy nearly two decades of dominance and win six Super Bowl titles. As a result, Lewis' hit on Bledsoe is often noted for its impact on NFL history.

One of the more notable games Enberg also called was the 2005 AFC Divisional matchup between the Pittsburgh Steelers and Indianapolis Colts that saw the Steelers go on to upset the Colts 21–18 en route to their victory in Super Bowl XL in what is considered one of the biggest upsets in NFL history. Coincidentally, Enberg also called a previous playoff game between the two teams for NBC, the 1995 AFC Championship Game, a 20–16 Steelers victory that is often marked as one of the NFL's greatest games.

Another enduring element of Enberg's broadcasting legacy was his ability to provide warm and poignant reflections on the sporting events he covered. Enberg Essays, as they came to be known, were a regular feature of CBS's coverage of college basketball's Final Four.

On March 27, 2010, Enberg called his final college basketball game for CBS, an East Regional tournament final featuring the Kentucky Wildcats versus the West Virginia Mountaineers. After becoming the Padres' play-by-play announcer, Enberg said he hoped to continue calling late-season NFL games for CBS, but his name was omitted from the network's announcing roster for 2010. He continued to call the US Open for CBS through 2011.

Enberg returned to call one match and serve as an essayist during the 2014 US Open, to help commemorate CBS's last year covering the event before ESPN took over in 2015.

On September 14, 2009, Juan Martín del Potro defeated Roger Federer to win the Men's US Open Championship. Enberg hosted the post-match ceremony during which del Potro requested to address his fans in Spanish. Enberg declined the request saying that he was running out of time but went on to list the corporate sponsored prizes del Potro won. A couple of minutes later, Del Potro made the same request again and only then Enberg relented saying "Very quickly, in Spanish, he wants to say hello to his friends here and in Argentina". An emotional del Potro finally spoke a few sentences in Spanish to a cheering crowd. Many viewers expressed disappointment with Enberg and CBS over the interview. A CBS executive later defended Enberg, noting that the contract with the United States Tennis Association required that certain sponsors receive time during the ceremony.

== ESPN (2004–2011) ==
Beginning in 2004, Enberg served as a play-by-play announcer for ESPN2's coverage of the Wimbledon and French Open tennis tournaments, adding the Australian Open the following year. Enberg came to ESPN on lease from CBS, where he already called the US Open, the one Grand Slam tournament not covered by ESPN until 2009. At the 2004 French Open, Enberg called a match per day and also provided his "Enberg Moments". At Wimbledon in 2004, he participated in a new one-hour morning show called Breakfast at Wimbledon. ESPN asked CBS for permission to use Enberg during the summer of 2004 at both the French Open and Wimbledon. Enberg then surprised his new bosses by volunteering for the 2005 Australian Open in January 2005. "I've never been to Australia," he said. "At my age then [69], to be able to work a full Grand Slam is something I'd like to have at the back of my book." Enberg stopped calling the French Open after 2009 due to his Padres commitments, though he continued to call the Wimbledon and Australian Open tournaments over the next two years. In June 2011, it was reported that his ESPN contract had ended and that the 2011 Wimbledon tournament would be his final one for ESPN.

== San Diego Padres ==
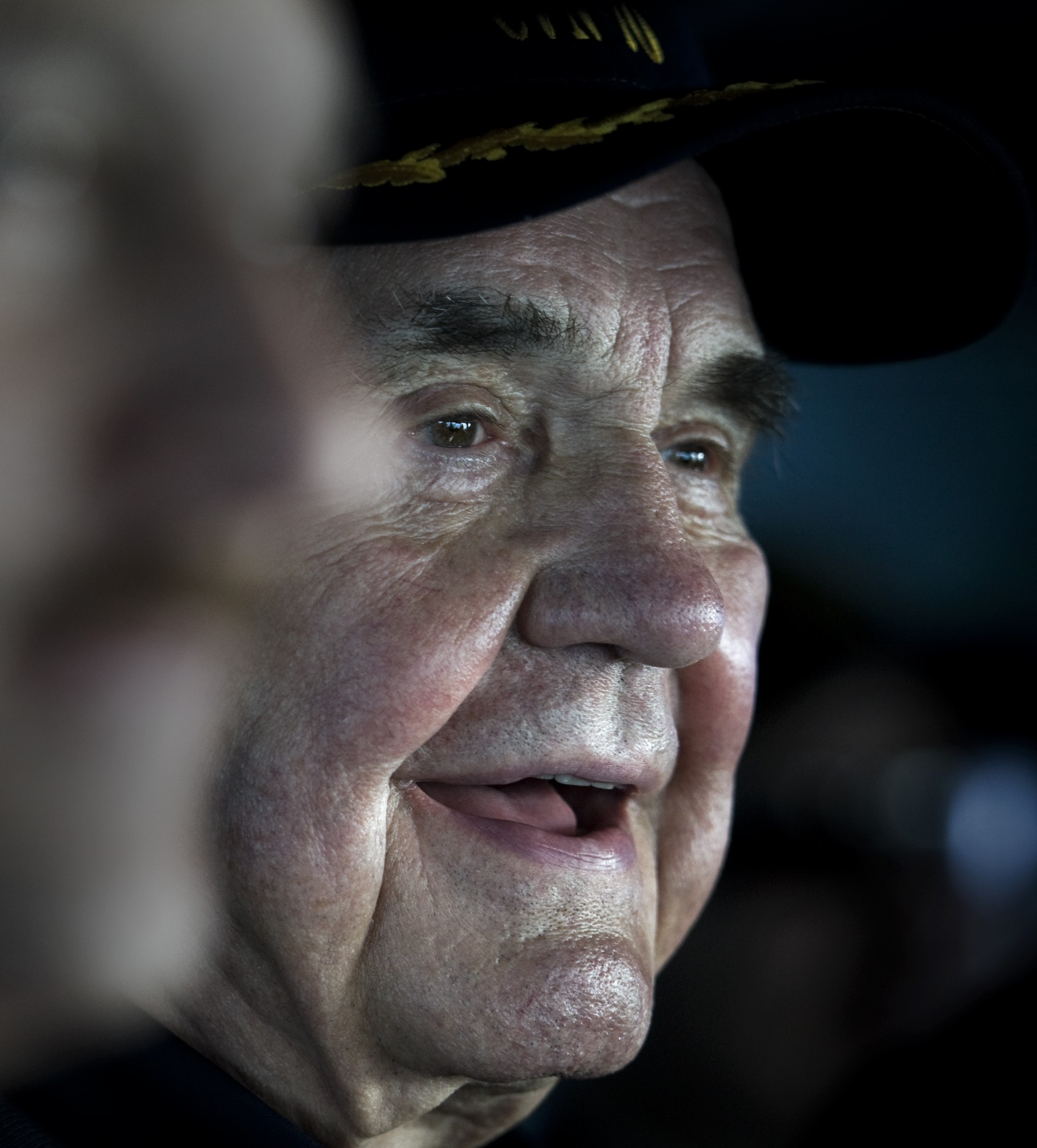
Enberg in 2010

In December 2009, Enberg was hired as a television play-by-play announcer by the San Diego Padres, signing a multi-year deal to call 110–120 games a season for channel 4SD. Enberg primarily teamed with Mark Grant on the Padres' telecasts.

In his debut season as a Padres broadcaster, Enberg took some criticism from fans over a perceived lack of enthusiasm for the home team. Told that he was regarded by some viewers as getting "too excited" over plays by opposing players, Enberg responded, "I find that a real compliment." He did move to placate the critics, however, by limiting the use of his signature home run call of "Touch 'em all!" to Padres home runs.

In 2012, Enberg returned as play-by-play voice of the Padres as they moved their telecasts from 4SD to Fox Sports San Diego, in the first year of a 20-year deal between the team and the newly formed network. On September 23, 2015, Enberg indicated he would call Padres games for one more season in 2016, then retire.

On May 21, 2016, Enberg served as a special guest play-by-play broadcaster for the Detroit Tigers in their home game with the Tampa Bay Rays, calling the game on Fox Sports Detroit alongside analyst Kirk Gibson. The Tigers were Enberg's boyhood team, as he lived in the Detroit area. Enberg also called a weekend series for the Tigers post retirement, an interleague series between the Tigers and the Dodgers, August 18–20, 2017 for FSD and one game for FS1.

Enberg's last game with the Padres was October 2, 2016. In his last week on air, he made a guest appearance with Los Angeles Dodgers announcer Vin Scully, who also was retiring at the end of the baseball season, after a 67-year career.

== Other appearances ==
In 2006 and 2007, Enberg called Thursday night and postseason NFL games for Westwood One radio. Also in 2006, he began narrating a documentary style television series for Fox Sports Net called In Focus on FSN. For Fox Sports Net, he called his final college basketball game on November 11, 2012, aboard the USS Midway alongside Steve Kerr.

In addition to his career in sports broadcasting, Enberg hosted three game shows besides the aforementioned Sports Challenge: The Perfect Match in 1967, Baffle on NBC from 1973 through 1974, and Three for the Money on NBC in 1975. He also lent his voice to the animated CBS cartoon series Where's Huddles? (1970), the film Rollerball (1975), and the American-dubbed version of the animated UK Christmas special Robbie the Reindeer: Hooves of Fire (2002); made appearances in the films Two-Minute Warning (1976), Gus (1976), Heaven Can Wait (1978), The Longshot (1986), The Naked Gun (1988), and Mr. 3000 (2004); and appeared as himself in episodes of such television programs as The King of Queens and CSI: NY. In addition, Enberg was seen in a series of commercials for GTE during the 1980s and early 1990s, and was the voice of the announcer in the classic Talking Football tabletop game from Mattel.

=== Film roles ===
- Another Nice Mess (1972) – Olympics Announcer (voice)
- Rollerball (1975) – Pregame Announcer (uncredited)
- Hustle (1975) – Radio Announcer (voice, uncredited)
- Gus (1976) – Atoms' Announcer
- Two-Minute Warning (1976) – Himself
- Murder at the World Series (1977) – Radio Announcer
- Heaven Can Wait (1978) – TV Interviewer
- The Longshot (1986) – Radio Announcer
- The Naked Gun: From the Files of Police Squad! (1988) – The Baseball Announcer #2
- Mr. 3000 (2004) – Brewers Sportscaster

== Career timeline ==
- 1957–1961: Indiana Hoosiers football play-by-play
- 1957–1961: Indiana Hoosiers men's basketball play-by-play
- 1961–1965: assistant professor and baseball coach for the Matadors of California State University, Northridge
- 1966–1977: UCLA Bruins men's basketball play-by-play
- 1966–1977: Los Angeles Rams radio play-by-play
- 1967–1968: The Perfect Match host
- 1969–1978, 1985: California Angels play-by-play
- 1971–1979 Sports Challenge host
- 1973–1974: Baffle host
- 1975: Three for the Money host
- 1975–1981: NCAA Basketball on NBC play-by-play
- 1977–1998: NFL on NBC play-by-play
- 1977–1982: MLB on NBC play-by-play
- 1979, 1981–1999: Wimbledon play-by-play (NBC)
- 1980–1988: Rose Bowl play-by-play (NBC)
- 1983–1989: MLB on NBC studio host
- 1984–1990: Breeders' Cup host (NBC)
- 1988: 1988 Summer Olympics Gymnastics play-by-play (NBC)
- 1990–1999: NBA on NBC play-by-play
- 1992: 1992 Summer Olympics host (NBC)
- 1995–1999: PGA Tour on NBC host
- 1996: 1996 Summer Olympics contributor (NBC)
- 1998–1999: Notre Dame Football on NBC play-by-play
- 2000–2009: NFL on CBS play-by-play (2000–2005 #2) (2006–2009 #3)
- 2000–2010: NCAA Basketball on CBS play-by-play
- 2000–2011, 2014: US Open (tennis) play-by-play (CBS)
- 2000–2006: The Masters contributor (CBS)
- 2000–2006: PGA Championship contributor (CBS)
- 2004–2011: Wimbledon and Australian Open play-by-play (ESPN2)
- 2004–2009: French Open play-by-play (ESPN2)
- 2006–2007: Westwood One Thursday Night Football play-by-play
- 2006: In Focus on FSN narrator
- 2010–2016: San Diego Padres TV play-by-play

== Honors ==
Enberg garnered many awards and honors over the years, including 13 Sports Emmy Awards (as well as a Lifetime Achievement Emmy), nine National Sportscaster of the Year awards from the National Sportscasters and Sportswriters Association (and induction into that organization's Hall of Fame), five Sportscaster of the Year awards from the American Sportscasters Association (which also ranked Enberg tenth in its 2009 listing of the Top 50 Sportscasters of All Time), the Pete Rozelle Award from the Pro Football Hall of Fame, the Curt Gowdy Award from the Basketball Hall of Fame, the Ford Frick Award from the National Baseball Hall of Fame, and a star on the Hollywood Walk of Fame. Enberg is the only sportscaster thus far to win Emmys in three categories (broadcasting, writing, and producing), and in 1973 became the first U.S. sportscaster to visit the People's Republic of China.

Enberg was inducted into Central Michigan University's Athletics Hall of Fame in 1993. The university named an academic center for him in 2007. A student-athlete award in Enberg's name is presented annually to a Central Michigan student.

Enberg was raised in Armada, Michigan and was responsible for the naming of the Armada High School yearbook, the Regit (Tiger spelled backwards), a name it has to this day. A hallway in the Macomb Academy of Arts and Sciences, which is run by Armada school district and shares the building with its administration office, was named after him.

UCLA named its Media Center in Pauley Pavilion after Enberg in 2017 in his honor.

Indiana University awarded Enberg an honorary doctorate of humane letters in 2002. He would be inducted into the Indiana University Intercollegiate Athletics Hall of Fame in the fall of 2006.

Enberg also received honorary doctorates of humane letters from his alma mater Central Michigan University in 1980 and Marquette University in 2009, and gave the addresses at both universities' May commencement ceremonies.

In 1997, the College Sports Information Directors of America (CoSIDA) honored Enberg with an award in recognition of his longtime support of the organization's Academic All-America program. The Dick Enberg Award is given annually to a person whose actions and commitment have furthered the meaning and reach of the Academic All-America Teams Program and/or the student-athlete while promoting the values of education and academics. Past recipients include Gerald Ford, Mike Krzyzewski, Pat Summitt, and Joe Paterno. Enberg continued to be an avid supporter of the program, often lending his voice to video presentations related to CoSIDA's annual Academic All-America Hall of Fame ceremony.

In 2006, Enberg was Awarded the Ambassador Award of Excellence by the LA Sports & Entertainment Commission for his involvement in the community.

For his contributions to the Rose Bowl game and parade through the years, Enberg was inducted into the Rose Bowl Hall of Fame on December 31, 2011.

The National Baseball Hall of Fame named Enberg the 2015 recipient of the Ford C. Frick Award for excellence in baseball broadcasting. He was presented with the award in a ceremony during the Hall's induction weekend on July 25, 2015. Enberg was the second American sportscaster (after Curt Gowdy) to be selected for broadcasting awards from each of the Halls of Fame in professional football, basketball and baseball.

On August 20, 2017, the Detroit Sports Media (formerly Detroit Sports Broadcasters Association) named Enberg the 2017 recipient of the DSM Ernie Harwell Lifetime Contribution Award for a lifetime of service to the sports broadcasting community.

== Personal life ==
Although Enberg was Finnish on his paternal side, his surname was of Swedish origin. During an ESPN television broadcast from the Wimbledon tennis championships on June 24, 2010, Enberg said his father was born in Finland, and changed his name from the Finnish "Katajavuori" to the Swedish equivalent Enberg on arrival in the U.S. as he felt it would be a simpler name. The surname means "juniper mountain." Enberg said it pleased him that Jarkko Nieminen was doing so well as Finland is close to his heart and it is a small nation with few tennis facilities.

While working at Saginaw, Michigan radio station WSAM early in his career, Enberg considered changing his name professionally to "Dick Breen" after being told that "Enberg" was too Jewish-sounding. The story of his surname is also detailed in his autobiography, Oh My!

Enberg was the father of actor Alexander Enberg, actor-musician Andrew Enberg, and daughter Jennifer Enberg by former wife Jeri Taylor. Enberg and Taylor divorced in 1973. At the time of his death, he was married to his second wife, Barbara (née Almori), with whom he had one son, Ted Enberg (also a sportscaster), and two daughters, Nicole and Emily.

Ted Enberg is a play-by-play broadcaster for ESPN, Pac-12 Network and called the U.S. Open Tennis Championships in 2017. Ted currently resides in San Diego and has a sports podcast with PodcastOne entitled, Sound of Success. He is married to Sara Elizabeth Miller. Ted would ultimately portray his father in the 2022 HBO series Winning Time: The Rise of the Lakers Dynasty.

Enberg penned a one-man theatrical play titled COACH, as a tribute to his former television broadcast partner and late friend, Al McGuire, the extraordinary college basketball coach and commentator. It debuted at Marquette University's Helfaer Theater in 2005. It drew positive reviews as an accurate portrayal of the eccentric coach. At the 2007 NCAA Final Four in Atlanta, Enberg presented three performances of COACH at the Alliance Theater. Those attending the April 1 matinée included Hall of Famers coach Dean Smith (whom McGuire defeated in the 1977 NCAA Championship in Atlanta) and former UCLA All-American center Bill Walton. The play was then performed at Hofstra University, near Al's old neighborhood on Long Island in New York. It has since been booked in San Diego, Los Angeles, Las Vegas, Chicago, Portland, Maine, North Carolina and Indiana. The most recent performance was at the New York Athletic Club in Manhattan. Actor Cotter Smith portrayed McGuire in the one-man show.

Enberg served as Chairman of the American Sportscasters Association from 1983 until 2017. He was also a board member for the Lott IMPACT Trophy, which is named after Pro Football Hall of Fame defensive back Ronnie Lott and is given annually to college football's Defensive IMPACT Player of the Year.

== Death ==
Enberg died on December 21, 2017, in La Jolla, California, from a suspected heart attack. He was 82. He had made his final public appearance six weeks prior at the Moores Opera House on the University of Houston campus as part of a panel discussion on the "Game of the Century"; the discussion was telecast January 15, 2018 on CBS Sports Network and was dedicated to him.

== Bibliography ==
- Einhorn, Eddie; Ron Rapaport (2006). How March Became Madness: How the NCAA Tournament Became the Greatest Sporting Event in America. Chicago, Illinois: Triumph Books. ISBN 1-57243-809-6.
- Enberg, Dick; Jim Perry (2004). Oh My!. Champaign, Illinois: Sports Publishing, LLC. ISBN 1-58261-824-0.
- Enberg, Dick (2012). Dick Enberg: Oh My!. Champaign, Illinois: Skyhorse Publishing Inc. ISBN 978-1-61321-005-5.
- Smale, David (1989). Pauley Pavilion: College Basketball's Showplace. Manhattan, Kansas: Sports Memories Publishing / Jostens Publishing Company. LCC GV885.43.C34 S63 1989.

Sporting positions
Preceded by Curt Gowdy	NCAA Men's Final Four play-by-play announcer 1976–1981	Succeeded by Gary Bender
Preceded by Curt Gowdy	NFL on NBC lead play-by-play 1979–1997	Succeeded by Al Michaels (in 2006)
Preceded by Keith Jackson and Al Michaels	World Series network television play-by-play announcer (with Joe Garagiola); 1982	Succeeded by Al Michaels (odd numbered years); Vin Scully (even numbered years)
Preceded by Curt Gowdy	Play-by-play announcer, Rose Bowl; 1980–1988	Succeeded by Keith Jackson
Preceded by Curt Gowdy	Super Bowl television play-by-play announcer (AFC package carrier); 1980–1997	Succeeded by Greg Gumbel
Preceded by Joe Garagiola	Lead play-by-play announcer, Major League Baseball on NBC; 1982 (alternating with Joe Garagiola)	Succeeded by Vin Scully
Preceded by Joe Garagiola	Lead play-by-play announcer, Major League Baseball Game of the Week; 1982 (alternating with Joe Garagiola)	Succeeded by Vin Scully
