= Don McGuire =

Don or Donald McGuire may refer to:

- Don McGuire (television executive) (?–2020), American television sports executive
- Don McGuire (actor) (1919–1999), American actor, director, screenwriter and producer
- Donald McGuire (?–2018), singer in The Hilltoppers
- Donald McGuire (Jesuit) (1930—2017), convicted child molester
