= Three for the Money =

American game show

- Three for the Money logo.
- Created by: Stefan Hatos; Monty Hall; Wes Cox (Concept)
- Directed by: Hank Behar
- Presented by: Dick Enberg
- Announcer: Jack Clark
- Country of origin: United States
- No. of episodes: 40

Production
- Producer: Stu Billett
- Production locations: NBC Studios, Burbank, California
- Running time: 25 Minutes
- Production company: Stefan Hatos-Monty Hall Productions

Original release
- Network: NBC
- Release: September 29 – November 28, 1975

Three for the Money is an American game show produced by Stefan Hatos-Monty Hall Productions that aired on NBC from September 29 to November 28, 1975. Dick Enberg was the host with Jack Clark announcing. Enberg was also hosting Sports Challenge at the time and had just joined NBC's sports division.

Three for the Money was picked up to replace Jackpot after it was cancelled after 21 months and was placed at 12:30 pm Eastern following The Magnificent Marble Machine. The show only aired for eight weeks (with an off-air week near the end) and was replaced by its lead-in, following an expansion of Wheel of Fortune to sixty minutes.

== Game play ==
Two teams of two studio contestants and one celebrity captain competed all week in a question-and-answer game. The team trailing in score at the start of the game (or the team that won a coin toss, for the first game of the week) chose how many of the opposing team they wanted to challenge. They then chose from one of three categories which presented three general knowledge questions in the form of three clues displayed on an electronic board. Each contestant from the offense played one category and the captain picked one, two, or all three contestants from the other team to play against the single contestant on the offense. Any contestant playing in the round can buzz in anytime to guess the correct answer. For each contestant on the defending knocked out with a correct answer from the offense, the cash values were as the following: one contestant for $100, two for $200, and all three for $300; a correct answer from the defending team earned that team $100. A wrong answer gave the other team the remaining clue(s) without opposition.

After the three categories were played came the "Catch-Up Round", a two-minute rapid-fire speed round. The Catch-Up Round was played similarly to the first part of the game, but there were no categories. During the round, if they were trailing, the captain could call a time-out and stop the clock to switch contestants on either or both teams to compete for the duration of the round; each captain was allotted one time-out. A correct answer would stop the clock if the trailing team overtook the opponents, therefore allowing the other team to make their decision for new contestants. If the game ended in a tie, Enberg read one last question with a three-on-three challenge, and the team who rang in got to answer, and if correct, won the game, but otherwise, the opponents had a chance to answer.

The team with the higher score kept their money and played the bonus round, where the three contestants picked a category from three and alternated turns and identified subjects based on revealing one letter at a time, with the team having to get seven right answers in 45 seconds. If a teammate gave a wrong answer, he or she was knocked out, though the other teammates could continue to answer. The jackpot started at $1,000 and increased $1,000 every day during the week, up to $5,000 on Friday (thus, winning all five bonus rounds throughout the week would earn a team $15,000).

The two civilians stayed together all week (celebrity captains alternated teams daily), and the scoring money progressed through the course of the week. Whichever team earned the most money during the week split the cash between its two civilian members, and each player also received a new car from Chevrolet. The runner-up team received a $1,000 Spiegel gift certificate.

== Episode status ==
The UCLA Film and Television Archive holds both pilots, plus the November 13 and 21 episodes. Additionally, both the series premiere and the November 14 episode circulate among collectors.
