= Sports Challenge =

- Genre: Game Show
- Directed by: Glenn Swanson; Jerry Hughes; Gary Brown
- Presented by: Dick Enberg
- Announcer: Johnny Gilbert; Art James; John Harlan
- Theme music composer: Patrick Williams
- Country of origin: United States
- No. of seasons: 9

Production
- Producers: Gerry Gross; Gary Brown; Dick Enberg
- Running time: 30 Minutes
- Production company: Gerry Gross Productions

Original release
- Network: Syndicated
- Release: January 23, 1971 – September 1979
- Network: CBS
- Release: May 20 – September 9, 1973

Sports Challenge is a sports-centered game show that aired in weekly syndication from 1971 to 1979, with a separate version that aired briefly on CBS weekends from May 20 to September 9, 1973. Dick Enberg was host. Johnny Gilbert, Art James, and John Harlan announced.

The show was taped at the KTLA/Golden West studios in Los Angeles (known today as Sunset Bronson Studios), with the exception of some shows taped at Metromedia Square.

The show's theme throughout its run was an instrumental version of The Beatles' "Get Back" by Pat Williams, from his Verve Records album Heavy Vibrations; a different theme was briefly used for the 1977–1978 season, but the original theme replaced it for the show's final season.

== Format ==
Sports Challenge featured two teams of three sports figures representing a sport or a team. In the latter case, the teams could be made up of former players or members of the current team, solely dependent on whom the show's producers were able to book. During the early part of the run, Dick Enberg would read a disclaimer that "Sports Challenge is a game of quick recall, and whether our stars win or lose is not solely based on knowledge, but on how they react to the questions."

=== Main Game ===
Four rounds were played. In each round, a film clip was shown, and a toss-up question would be asked about or pertaining to the clip. The first team to buzz in with a correct answer earned 20 points and a chance at scoring more with two 10-point "free throws." If no one answered correctly on the first toss-up, the free throws became toss-ups. On the toss-up, when ringing in, they must answer the question immediately. If they are incorrect or run out of time, the opposing team gets five seconds to confer amongst themselves before answering the question.

On a free throw, if the team to which the free throw is assigned is unable to answer correctly within five seconds for 10 points, the other team can steal with a correct answer to pick up 20 points.

Some questions about or pertaining to the clip could contain either multiple choice or contain clues.

=== Classic Round ===
Partway through the run, the Classic Round was played after the third round before the Bonus Biography. One final film clip was shown, and the question that followed it was worth 30 points.

=== Bonus Biography ===
After the 30-point question, the Bonus Biography was played. A silhouette of a famous athlete was shown on-screen, and the teams would have 60 seconds (originally 90 seconds) to figure out who it was based on clues given by announcer Gilbert (although Enberg later took over this duty). The team that answered this correctly earned one point for every second left on the clock. At one point in the show's run, if neither team successfully identified the subject, the subject won a new car.

Whoever was in the lead after the Bonus Biography won the game and $1,000 worth of Voit (later Rawlings) sporting goods for an announced junior athletic organization. The losing team received $500 worth of sporting goods for the junior athletic organization whom they represented.

Occasionally, the Bonus Biography description would be finished by stating the subject's name prior to the expiration of time. When that happened, a single toss-up question would be asked for the remainder of the points.

Rarely, the Bonus Biography subject would divulge himself prior to taping. In that case, Enberg would ask a question about that subject and read clues to the answer to that question on the clock. The show would also use this procedure (without the clock) to break a tie at the end of the Bonus Biography round.

For at least the first few episodes, each participant also received $1 for every point their team scored; By the middle of the first season, no references to any such cash winnings were made.

The winning team returned the following week to face a new set of challengers, and continued until defeated. The team of Tommy Henrich, Joe DiMaggio, and Lefty Gomez (New York Yankees) set a record for winning the game 8 consecutive times, which was tied once by the team of Duke Snider, Don Drysdale, and Don Newcombe (Brooklyn Dodgers) during the show's final season, in 1979.

== The Best of Sports Challenge ==
In 1982, Enberg and partners, including Billy Packer and Don McGuire, created "Oh My!" Productions and purchased the Sports Challenge library, plus the right to produce new shows, from Gerry Gross Productions. Oh My entered an agreement with ESPN to air the old shows under the title The Best of Sports Challenge, with updated openings by Enberg. National rights holders, including MLB and the NFL, challenged Oh My's rights, proving that Gross owed them residual fees, and the shows were taken off after a year. However, some Best of prints continue to circulate among the reruns still airing today.

== Merchandising ==
In 1973, Mattel released the "Sports Challenge Instant Replay" toy, in which the user would insert a small pre-recorded disc to learn information about a certain athlete or activity. The unit was promoted on-air by Enberg and given to all athletes who competed on the show.

Later in the show's run, Scarab released a series of 7" picture discs, which featured Enberg reading statistics about a famous baseball player, then asking a difficult trivia question about the player. About a dozen records were released.

== Episode status ==
Sports Challenge is believed to be completely intact. Classic Sports Network (now ESPN Classic), ESPN, and ESPN2 have all aired the series in the past.
