= Wendell Niles =

American radio and television announcer (1904–1994)

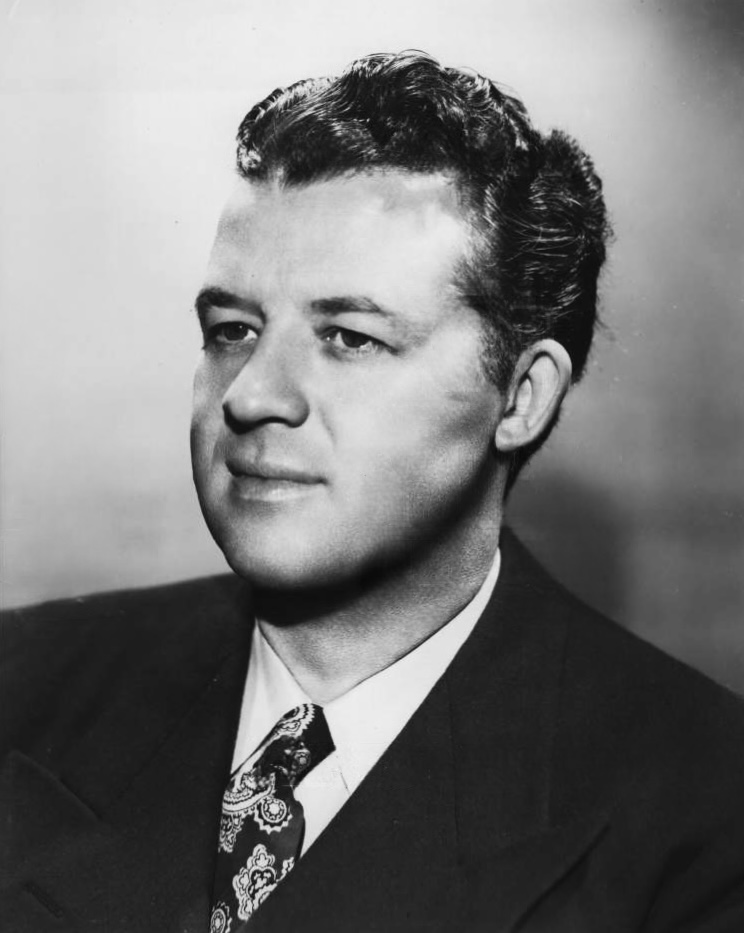
- Niles in 1945
- Born: December 29, 1904; Livingston, Montana, U.S.
- Died: March 28, 1994 (aged 89); Toluca Lake, California, U.S.
- Education: New York University, University of Montana
- Occupations: Radio and TV announcer

Wendell Niles (December 29, 1904 – March 28, 1994) was an announcer during the American golden age of radio and later in television.

== Early years ==
Niles was born in Livingston, Montana and grew up there. He attended New York University and the University of Montana.

== Career ==
Niles worked on such radio shows as The Charlotte Greenwood Show, Hedda Hopper's Hollywood, The Adventures of Philip Marlowe, The Man Called X, The Bob Hope Show, The Burns & Allen Show, The Milton Berle Show and The Chase and Sanborn Hour. On February 15, 1950, Wendell starred in the radio pilot for The Adventures of the Scarlet Cloak along with Gerald Mohr.

He began in entertainment by touring in the 1920s with his own orchestra, playing with the Dorsey Brothers and Bix Beiderbecke.

In the early 1930s, Niles was an announcer at radio station KOL in Seattle. He moved to Los Angeles, California, in 1935 to join George Burns and Gracie Allen.

He and his brother, Ken Niles, developed one of the first radio dramas, which eventually became Theatre of the Mind.

He toured with Bob Hope during World War II and narrated a 1936 Academy Award-winning short film on the life of tennis great Bill Tilden. Niles and Don Pridle were co-hosts of the ABC radio program Icebox Follies in 1945.

Among his film credits are Knute Rockne, All American (1940) with Ronald Reagan and Hollywood or Bust (the last Martin & Lewis comedy, 1956) as himself.

Wendell Niles was the announcer for TV's "America's Show Of Surprises"... It Could Be You, and for the Hatos-Hall production Your First Impression. Niles was also the original announcer for Let's Make a Deal during that show's first season in 1963 and 1964; he was later replaced by Jay Stewart.

Niles and his brother, Ken, are the first brothers to have stars on the Hollywood Walk of Fame.

== Death ==
Niles died of Parkinson's disease in his Toluca Lake, California home at the age of 89.

== Selected filmography ==
- Knute Rockne, All American (1940)
- The Hitch-Hiker (1953)
- Beyond a Reasonable Doubt (1956)
- Hollywood or Bust (1956)

== Sources ==
- "Wendell Niles; Radio and TV Announcer, 89". The New York Times. March 31, 1994.
- Obituary in Variety, March 29, 1994. Retrieved on July 18, 2023.
