= Musical Chairs (1955 game show) =

- Presented by: Bill Leyden
- Country of origin: United States

Production
- Running time: 30 minutes

Original release
- Network: NBC
- Release: July 9 – September 17, 1955

Musical Chairs is an American primetime panel game show that ran from July 9 to September 17, 1955 on NBC. The host was Bill Leyden and the show featured voice actor Mel Blanc, composer Johnny Mercer, singer Peggy Lee, and orchestra leader Bobby Troup as regular panelists.

Troup's band, the Troup Group, provided the music for the game show, often with the assistance of the Cheerleaders singing group or members of the panel itself.

The show was a summer replacement series on NBC after a two-year run in Los Angeles.

== Format ==
The program followed a format that was pioneered by the long-running radio program Information Please (which itself became a summer replacement series for CBS in 1952). Viewers were encouraged to mail questions about music to the network in an attempt to challenge the knowledge of a four-person panel (the three regular panelists plus a guest). The questions that Leyden read on the air to the panel could involve any aspect of music, from composing to performing to words, music, and arrangement. Individual panelists may be called to imitate the singing or playing style of well-known performers.

No score was kept in Musical Chairs as the panelists were not in competition with each other (in fact, collaborations between panelists were not uncommon). Viewers who submitted questions that stumped the panel were awarded 21-inch televisions from RCA, the parent company of NBC at the time.

== Cancellation ==
Musical Chairs disappeared from the airwaves after the airing of its eleventh episode on September 17. Host Bill Leyden moved on from his first television network program to the game show that established him as a household name in America for the latter half of the 1950s: It Could Be You.

== Episode status ==
Only one episode is known to exist – Episode #6 (August 13), featuring Helen O'Connell as a guest panelist.
