= Bill Leyden =

American game show host

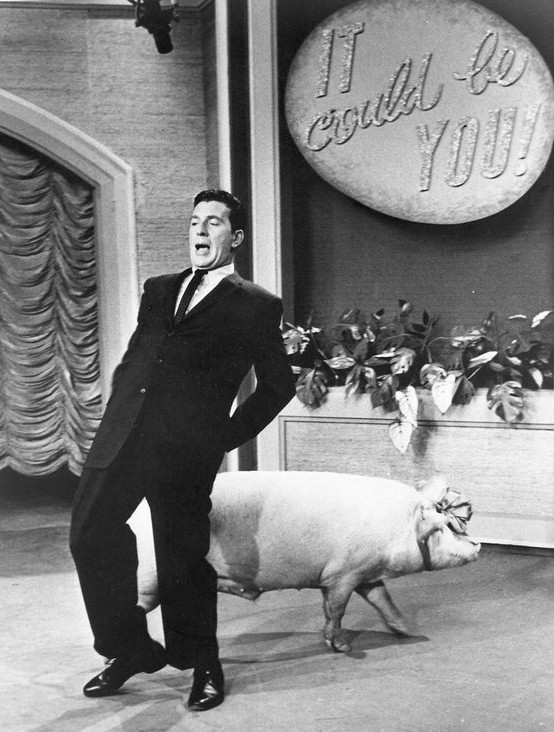
Bill Leyden in a publicity photo for It Could Be You, 1961

William Leyden (February 1, 1917, in Chicago, Illinois – March 11, 1970, in Hollywood, California) was a television game show host and announcer who emceed six game shows, including It Could Be You (1956–61), Your First Impression (1962–64, with Dennis James), and You're Putting Me On (1969). In addition, he hosted movies on KTTV, and played small roles in a handful of films, including Jerry Lewis's The Patsy (1964).

During World War II Leyden served in the Marine Corps. After returning to Chicago following the war, Leyden worked as an NBC page while getting a degree in Archaeology from DePaul University. Leyden started his broadcast career in Cleveland as a radio announcer. Then moved to Los Angeles and became a disc jockey on radio stations KMPC and KFWB, and later was an announcer for the syndicated radio series The Liberace Program (1954–55), before moving over to television, where he hosted several game shows, the most successful of which was It Could Be You.

During his run on It Could Be You, Leyden was touted by announcer Wendell Niles as "the man who will amaze you with what he knows about you", partly because Leyden was often helped onstage and in the audience by well-concealed TelePrompters and "a team of spies and operatives" who investigated potential contestants.

Although he was extremely popular, both in front of the camera and behind the microphone, Leyden's chronic health problems limited his on-screen work in the latter half of the 1960s. Regular panelists Bill Cullen and Larry Blyden filled in for Leyden on You're Putting Me On, with Blyden becoming the permanent host of the show when Leyden suffered a cerebral hemorrhage in September 1969. He died six months later at the age of 53. For his television work, Leyden received a star on the Hollywood Walk of Fame.

== Game shows ==
- You're Putting Me On (1969) - NBC
- Super Bingo (1967) - syndicated
- Let's Face It (1967) - syndicated
- Call My Bluff (1965) - NBC
- Your First Impression (1962–1964) - NBC
- It Could Be You (1956–1961) - NBC - had both daytime and nighttime versions
- Musical Chairs (1955) - NBC -summer series
