= Masquerade Party =

American television game show

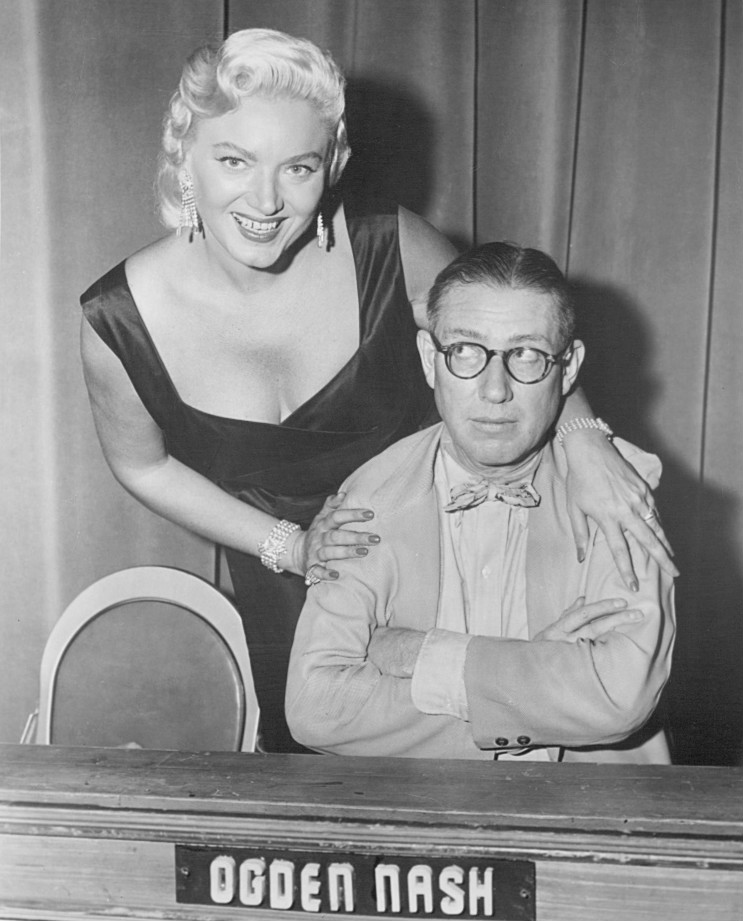
- Panelist Ogden Nash and Dagmar, 1955
- Presented by: Bud Collyer; Douglas Edwards; Peter Donald; Eddie Bracken; Robert Q. Lewis; Bert Parks
- Announcer: Johnny Olson
- Country of origin: United States
- No. of seasons: 8

Production
- Running time: 22–25 minutes
- Production company: Wolf Productions

Original release
- Network: NBC (1952, 1957, 1958–59, 1960); CBS (1953, 1954, 1958, 1959–60); ABC (1954–1956)
- Release: July 14, 1952 – September 23, 1960

Masquerade Party is an American television game show. During its original run from 1952 to 1960, the show appeared at various times on ABC, NBC, and CBS. A syndicated revival was produced for one season in 1974–75.

The gameplay consisted of a panel of celebrities attempting to guess the identity of a celebrity who was disguised with heavy make-up and/or a costume. The disguise would provide clues as to the celebrity's actual identity. For example, actor Gary Burghoff appeared in 1974 as a robot with a radar, alluding to his role as Radar O'Reilly on M*A*S*H. The panel asked yes-or-no questions of the disguised celebrity, after which they were given another clue. They then had one last chance to guess the identity, after which the celebrity revealed their true identity.

== 1952–1960 ==
The original show had several well-known celebrities on its panel including Pat Carroll, Ilka Chase, Buff Cobb, Dagmar, Sam Levenson, Audrey Meadows, Ogden Nash, Betsy Palmer, and Jonathan Winters.

Comedian Allan Sherman was the producer, and Stefan Hatos was executive producer. The show's theme music was "The Comedians", an orchestral composition by Dmitry Kabalevsky. The oversensitivity of the show towards advertisers, and political correctness complaints, made it fall into a hoax of the satirical magazine The Realist in 1960.

This incarnation was ranked eighth on TV Guide's 2001 list of "The 50 Greatest Game Shows of All Time".

=== Episode status ===
Five episodes are known to survive.

Three exist among traders and are from 1955, 1957 and 1959 (Donald, Bracken, and Parks respectively). The 1955 episode features George DeWitt (then hosting Name That Tune) as a guest.

The UCLA Film and Television Archive holds episodes dated October 6, 1954 and May 5, 1955 (the latter also in the trading circuit).

=== Critical response ===
A review in The New York Times in 1953 said that the show "has a mildly entertaining gimmick". The review complimented the craftsmanship of the costumes ("what makes the show"). It suggested that the program would be more entertaining for viewers if disguised guests were not identified on-screen as soon as they appeared.

== 1974–1975 ==
Masquerade Party
- Created by: Stefan Hatos; Monty Hall
- Presented by: Richard Dawson
- Announcer: Jay Stewart
- Country of origin: United States
- No. of seasons: 1
- No. of episodes: 30

Production
- Running time: 22–24 minutes
- Production company: Stefan Hatos-Monty Hall Productions

Original release
- Network: Weekly syndicated
- Release: September 9, 1974 – March 31, 1975

In 1974, Masquerade Party was revived for syndication by Stefan Hatos-Monty Hall Productions and aired weekly for one season. Richard Dawson hosted the revival with Jay Stewart announcing.

The basic premise was the same as the original show. Bill Bixby, Lee Meriwether, and Nipsey Russell were regular panelists. Col. Harland Sanders of Kentucky Fried Chicken fame made an appearance as a celebrity guest.

A reference to this version was made in a final-season episode of The Odd Couple. Felix asks Oscar what he is watching on television, and Oscar reports, "Masquerade Party with Richard Dawson." Felix, who said he knew Dawson in the Army, replies "That man ruined my life!"

=== Episode status ===
Two episodes are known to exist. One is a studio master taped July 10, 1974 featuring Allen Ludden (disguised as a Southern judge) as a guest; the UCLA Archive lists an episode dated July 9, 1974. The other was recorded July 13, 1974 featuring William Shatner (disguised as a riverboat captain), Charles Nelson Reilly, Howard Duff and Carolyn Jones. This episode was shared to the public by the YouTube channel of Wink Martindale and his production company in 2020, and is a studio recording featuring studio commentary not meant for broadcast.
