= Jack Clark (television personality) =

American television game show host and announcer (1925–1988)

- Clark as host on The Cross-Wits
- Born: Jack Leslie Clark; November 25, 1925; St. Joseph, Missouri, U.S.
- Died: July 21, 1988 (aged 62); Los Angeles, California, U.S.
- Occupations: Game show host Announcer
- Years active: 1951–1988
- Notable credit(s): The Cross-Wits; Wheel of Fortune (1980–1988)
- Spouse: Barbara McKnight (m. 1951)
- Children: 4

Jack Leslie Clark (November 25, 1925 – July 21, 1988) was an American television personality, game show host, and announcer. He is best known for hosting The Cross-Wits, and as an offstage announcer for Password and Wheel of Fortune. On the latter, he succeeded original announcer Charlie O'Donnell and held the role from 1980 until his death in 1988 (O'Donnell took back the announcing position until his own death in 2010). On July 21, 1988, Clark died in Los Angeles, California from bone cancer at age 62.

== Early career ==
When Clark was a student at UC Berkeley, he began his career as a substitute radio announcer for radio station KROW in Oakland.

After graduating from UC Berkeley, he moved to New York City, and first worked as a game show announcer for Password (where, when the word was flashed on the screen, he would whisper from offstage, "the password is...;" he also occasionally substituted for host Allen Ludden). From there, he went on to host 100 Grand (1963) and Dealer's Choice from 1974–1975 (replacing Bob Hastings).

Later, Clark hosted The Cross-Wits from 1975 until 1980, where he was noted for his rapport with the celebrities and contestants. Clark later went on to announce for several other game shows, including Split Second (1972–1975), Tattletales (1974), Three for the Money (1975), Second Chance (1977), and some Hollywood-originated episodes of The $10,000 Pyramid. Earlier in 1967, Clark also did some commercials for Winston cigarettes in Super King (100 MM) size.

Clark also hosted a number of pilot episodes that never passed that stage. Among them were Second Guessers, The $10,000 Sweep, and a 1985 proposed revival of Now You See It (later sold in 1989). He was also the announcer on another pilot, Monday Night Quarterback. Clark did many of these pilots "on spec" as favors to their producers.

== Wheel of Fortune and later career ==
After Wheel of Fortune announcer Charlie O'Donnell's departure from the show in 1980, Clark was chosen to become the show's regular announcer. During that time, Clark announced the daytime version and the primetime syndicated version, when the show's ratings peaked. Clark also announced for other television programs in the 1980s, including The $25,000 Pyramid (1982–1985), as well as being a spokesman for National Geographic magazine, appearing on-camera in their commercials.

== Illness and death ==
In early 1988, Clark was diagnosed with bone cancer. He continued announcing for Wheel of Fortune for as long as he was able to keep it up until shortly before the end of the 1987–88 season, when he was forced to leave the program for health reasons. During that time, hosts Pat Sajak and Vanna White announced the fee plugs on the syndicated version. When he was away, Charlie O'Donnell and Johnny Gilbert began filling in as substitute announcers. Clark was given a brief tribute to him twice on both the NBC daytime version of Wheel of Fortune on September 2, 1988 and at the start of the show's sixth season in syndication on September 5, 1988 after its summer break.

Most of you know, I suppose, that there is a gap between the time we tape these shows, and the time we air them. So we're about to tell you by the time you see this will have happened several weeks ago. For us as we're doing it, it is very new and very, very difficult for us to deal with. Or um, our dear friend, our announcer Jack Clark passed away. And, uh, Jack was with this show for a little over seven years, he brought a class and a professionalism, and a humor to his job that will be impossible to fully replace. Jack loved Wheel of Fortune, he loved the people who worked on the show, he loved the people who watched the show, and we all loved him, and we will miss him. Goodbye, old friend!

— Pat Sajak (from a closing segment from the NBC daytime version on September 2, 1988)

Well, as we have mentioned, this is, in fact, the first show of our new season. And, as many of you know during our summer off, we suffered a great loss. We lost a dear friend. Our announcer, Jack Clark, passed away. And while the intervening time has kind of helped with that immediate grief of jolt and sorrow you fell, we're still saddened around here, but we're left with a lot of warm and wonderful memories of a great guy and a wonderful broadcaster who added so much to this show and was so instrumental in its success. So, while we miss Jack very much, we treasure and just love the fact that we had the chance to know him and to work with him. He was a very special man. We'll be right back!

— Pat Sajak (after the second round at the start of the show's sixth season in syndication from September 5, 1988)

Clark died on July 21, 1988, at the age of 62, just before production of the 1988–1989 season was to begin, and is interred at Glendale's Forest Lawn Memorial Park.

He had requested that O'Donnell return to take his place, but since O'Donnell was not available due to his prior obligations with Barris Industries, Los Angeles-area disc jockey M.G. Kelly announced from mid-1988 to February 1989, when O'Donnell returned to the show. O'Donnell remained as the announcer until his death in 2010, after which he was succeeded by Jim Thornton (who would remain with the show until his dismissal shortly before the 2026–27 season).
