= Split Second (game show) =

American game show

- Logo for the 2023 revival
- Genre: Game show
- Created by: Monty Hall; Stefan Hatos
- Directed by: Kip Walton (1972–75); Henry Pasila (1986–87); Rob George (2023–24)
- Presented by: Tom Kennedy; Monty Hall; John Michael Higgins
- Announcer: Jack Clark; Sandy Hoyt
- Theme music composer: Stan Worth (1972–75); Todd Thicke (1986–87)
- Country of origin: United States
- Original language: English
- No. of seasons: 3 (ABC); 1 (Syndication); 3 (Game Show Network)
- No. of episodes: 1,025 (ABC); 130 (Syndication); 165 (Game Show Network)

Production
- Executive producers: Stefan Hatos (1972–87); Monty Hall (1972–87); Michael Binkow (2023–24); Nancy Glass (2023–24); Marcus Lemonis (2023–24); Sharon Hall (2023–24); John Michael Higgins (2023–24)
- Producers: Stu Billett (1972–73); Bob Synes (1973–75); Alan Gilbert (1986–87); Frank Bluestein (1986–87)
- Production locations: The Prospect Studios; Hollywood, California (1972–75); CHCH Studios; Hamilton, Ontario (1986–87); Lakeshore Studio; Toronto, Ontario (1987)
- Running time: 22–26 minutes
- Production companies: Stefan Hatos-Monty Hall Productions (1972–87); Concept Equity Funding Ltd. (1986–87); Marcus/Glass Productions (2023–24); Game Show Enterprises (2023–24)

Original release
- Network: ABC
- Release: March 20, 1972 – June 27, 1975
- Network: Syndication
- Release: December 15, 1986 – May 29, 1987
- Network: Game Show Network
- Release: April 17, 2023 – July 15, 2024

Split Second is an American game show that was created by Monty Hall and Stefan Hatos and produced by their production company, Stefan Hatos-Monty Hall Productions. Three contestants compete to answer three-part trivia questions to win cash.

There were two editions of Split Second produced by Hatos and Hall. The first was a daytime series produced for ABC that premiered on March 20, 1972, and ran until June 27, 1975, and was recorded at ABC Television Center in Hollywood. Tom Kennedy was the host for the original ABC version, with Jack Clark serving as announcer.

The second version was produced for syndication in Hamilton, Ontario, Canada, at CHCH-TV's studios; this series premiered December 15, 1986, and was a co-production of Hatos-Hall and distributors Concept Equity Funding Limited and Viacom Enterprises. Canadian television stations CHCH-TV, CFAC-TV, and CITV-TV assisted in the production of the syndicated series as well, but were not credited on American airings. The revival series featured Monty Hall as host with Sandy Hoyt as announcer and aired until the end of the 1986–87 season with reruns airing until September 11, 1987.

In February 2023, it was announced that the show would be revived by Game Show Network, with John Michael Higgins as host. It premiered on April 17, 2023 and ended on July 15, 2024.

== Gameplay ==
=== Main game ===
On each version, three contestants compete to answer.

Each question the host asks has three possible correct answers. Some questions took a form such as "Name the three films for which Katharine Hepburn won the Oscar for Best Actress." For most questions, three words, names, or phrases were displayed on a board that acted as clues, and the question took a form such as "Pick a word from the board and give its plural." For the ABC version, approximately once each episode there was also a "Memory Buster", in which the host gave a list of items and asked which three of them were common to each other.

Contestants ring in by pushing a button on their lecterns. The first person to ring in is permitted to provide any one of the three answers. The second-fastest provides one of the remaining answers, and finally, the slowest player got whatever was left, by default. In the '70s version, the clues on the board were revealed first and contestants could buzz in before the question was completed, whereas later versions allow contestants to buzz in only after the clues are revealed.

Each player receives money, or points on the 2023 version, for correct answers. The value of each answer was determined by the number of people supplying a correct response, and there was no penalty for a miss. Some questions were open-ended, meaning that if a contestant gave an incorrect answer, the next contestant could answer that same question. If the question was this/that, then once it was answered, it was out of play. In the 2023 revival, once a question is answered, it is out-of-play, regardless, except in the Countdown Round.

Payoff table for Split Second main game
Players correct	Round one			Round two		
Players correct	ABC	Syndicated	GSN	ABC	Syndicated	GSN
3	$5	$10	25 pts.	$10	$20	50 pts.
2	$10	$25	50 pts.	$25	$50	100 pts.
1	$25	$50	100 pts.	$50	$100	200 pts.

For example, if two players gave a correct answer in round one of the ABC version, each player received $10.

During the latter half of the ABC version, the first person to be the only contestant to respond correctly to a question during the first two rounds also won a bonus prize, theirs to keep regardless of the game's outcome.

=== Countdown Round ===
The Countdown Round serves as the final round and determines the winner. No money is awarded for correct answers in this round. Instead, a correct answer enables a player to keep control of the question and answer any parts that are still available. An incorrect answer passes control to the next player who has buzzed in.

Each player is required to give a set number of answers in order to win the game. The leader entering the Countdown Round has the lowest number, with the second-place player needing one more answer than the leader and the third-place player two. In the event of a tie, the tied players have to give the same number of answers. In the original series, the leader needed three answers to win (which could be accomplished in one question), the second-place player four, and the third place-player five. These numbers all increased by one when the syndicated series debuted, with four being the lowest number and six the highest.

On the GSN version, the leader needs four answers to win, the second-place player six, and the third-place player eight. In the event of a tie for first place, the tied players have to give five answers, whereas a tie for second place requires six.

The first player to count down to zero wins the game regardless of their total score and moves on to the bonus round. In previous versions, all three players kept their accumulated money. The champion wins $1,000 on the GSN version.

=== Bonus Round ===
==== 1970s ====
Five new cars were displayed onstage, each with a key in its ignition. One of the keys would start its car, while the other four would not. The champion selected a car and tried to start it, winning it and retiring undefeated if he/she succeeded. If the car did not start, he/she returned to play on the next episode and any cars he/she had failed to win were removed from play. Any contestant who won five consecutive games received the car of his/her choice and retired from the show.

A retiring champion also won a progressive cash jackpot which started at $1,000 after being claimed and increased by $500 for each unsuccessful bonus round. Originally, the starting amount and increment were both $200.

==== 1980s ====
The bonus round on the 1980s series featured only one car on stage and five numbered screens behind it, and to win the car, contestants had to select a specific number of screens that had the word "CAR" behind them. Originally, one screen had the word "CAR" behind it and the other four each had $1,000 (originally a bonus prize under the name "Showcase"). The champion selected one screen, and if it was the "CAR" screen, he/she won the car and retired undefeated, but if he/she selected one of the other four screens, he/she won an additional $1,000 and returned on the next episode to play again. Each day of a contestant's championship, the screens selected on his/her previous episodes were blacked out (eliminated) in order to increase his/her chances of winning the car.

Later in the series, the bonus round was changed to where three screens had the word "CAR" behind them and the remaining two had a bonus prize (either a fur coat or a vacation for two). The champion chose three screens, winning the car and retiring if the word "CAR" was behind all of them. If the champion selected one of the two prize screens, he/she could either return to play again or retire undefeated with the bonus prize and a cash bonus, which was $1,000 after the first game, $2,000 after the second, and $3,000 after the third. For a four-time champion, a fourth "CAR" screen was added, and if he/she failed to win the car, he/she could either return for their fifth and final game or retire undefeated with the bonus prize and $4,000.

In either format, five-time champions won the car automatically and retired undefeated.

==== 2023 ====
The bonus round on the 2023 Split Second is a timed variation of the main game, in which the champion must correctly answer seven questions in 60 seconds. Each question features two parts, with the contestant choosing one to answer (e.g. given two camera-related abbreviations, choose one and define it). If he/she gives an incorrect response, a new question is asked. The champion wins $10,000 for giving seven correct answers before time runs out.

== Broadcast history ==
=== ABC: 1972–1975 ===
Former logo, used from 1972 to 1975

Split Second occupied only one timeslot during its three-year run, 12:30 p.m. (11:30 a.m., Central), against the long-running CBS soap opera Search for Tomorrow and NBC's The Who, What, or Where Game. It displaced Password, which moved ahead a half-hour. Although never able to surmount Search, Split Second kept decent ratings in that hour. Within two years, NBC replaced 3W's with a succession of short-lived games.

Split Second's 1972 entry completed ABC's most successful block of daytime game shows, which included Password, The Newlywed Game, The Dating Game, and Let's Make a Deal, a lineup that lasted for nearly two years.

The decline of its lead-in, Password, began to adversely affect the Nielsens of Split Second, and it was one of four game shows ABC cancelled between June 27 and July 4, 1975. After a week of 60-minute episodes of the soap opera All My Children, Split Second was succeeded by another soap, Ryan's Hope. All My Children, which took over the game show's timeslot, did return to a full hour from late April 1977, continuing for the rest of its ABC run.

The winning contestant on the final episode lost the bonus game but was awarded the car anyway since he would have no opportunity to try again on a future show; the final $1,000 cash jackpot was split between the two runner-up contestants.

=== Syndication: 1986–1987 ===
In early 1986, Monty Hall had expressed his intentions to retire from hosting game shows altogether. He had been hosting a revival of Let’s Make a Deal in syndication since 1984, and he planned on stepping down from the series and launching a daily human interest program distributed by Worldvision Enterprises called For the People, where Hall would use connections he had made over various philanthropic ventures over the course of his life to offer assistance to viewers. The idea was for Hall to hand Let’s Make a Deal over to another host (likely the show’s announcer Dean Goss, as Hall allowed him to preside over several deals during the year) and start For the People in the fall. Both programs were presented in January 1986 at the annual NATPE convention. Not enough stations showed interest in either Hall’s creation or a third season of Let’s Make a Deal. Hall and Hatos decided to revive their other hit from the 1970s and developed a new edition of Split Second, this time with Hall hosting, for a midseason premiere in December 1986.

Although the show aired simultaneously in the United States and Canada upon its premiere, many more Canadian markets carried Split Second than their American counterparts. It was carried in at least one major American market, New York. With the reappearance of episodes on Canada's GameTV, there have emerged some notable production differences for episodes aired in Canada:

- As the show returns from its first two commercial breaks, some trivia questions are displayed on the screen for the viewers. On the American airings, three questions were shown. The Canadian airings usually only displayed one question, with announcer Sandy Hoyt filling the time with fee plugs.
- On the American airings, the bonus round is played immediately as the show comes back from its final commercial break. On the Canadian airings, a series of promotional consideration plugs are read before the round begins.
- In the closing credits, Canadian airings credit Hatos-Hall, Concept Equity Funding Limited, the Canadian stations involved in the production of the series, and distributor Viacom (now part of CBS Media Ventures). The Canadian entities do not receive credit on American airings; only Hatos-Hall and Viacom receive billing.

== Episode status ==
The UCLA Film and Television Archive holds 15 episodes spanning the entire run, beginning at episode #39 (May 11, 1972) and ending with the finale.

The syndicated version is completely intact, and is currently distributed by Fremantle under license from Marcus/Glass Productions, and reran on The Family Channel from August 30, 1993, to March 4, 1994, and January 2 to September 29, 1995, as part of its afternoon game show block. As of July 2019, GameTV is airing reruns. The music package for this version was added to the Television Production Music Museum in 2017, joining the 1972 package.

The 1986 series returned to American television in September 2019 when Buzzr, a digital television network owned by Fremantle, began airing it weekday mornings.

== International versions ==
=== Australia ===
The show ran in Australia from 1972 to 1973 on Nine Network, hosted by Ken James and later by Jimmy Hannan, and produced by Reg Grundy.

=== United Kingdom ===
The show ran in the United Kingdom from 1987 to 1988 in the STV region of ITV, hosted by Paul Coia.

Non-American versions of Split Second
Country	Name	Host	Network	Date premiered
Australia	Split Second	Ken James; Jimmy Hannan	Nine Network	1972–1973
United Kingdom	Split Second	Paul Coia	STV	1987–1988
