= It's Anybody's Guess =

American television game show

- Genre: Game show
- Directed by: Joseph Behar
- Presented by: Monty Hall
- Announcer: Jay Stewart
- Theme music composer: Stan Worth
- Country of origin: United States
- No. of episodes: 79

Production
- Executive producers: Stu Billett; Monty Hall; Stefan Hatos
- Producer: Steve Feke
- Production locations: NBC Studios; Burbank, California
- Running time: 25 minutes
- Production company: Stefan Hatos-Monty Hall Productions

Original release
- Network: NBC
- Release: June 13 – September 30, 1977

It's Anybody's Guess is an American game show broadcast on NBC from June 13 to September 30, 1977. Monty Hall hosted the show while Jay Stewart was the announcer. Produced by Stefan Hatos-Monty Hall Productions, it was Hall's first time hosting a show other than Let's Make a Deal since 1962, when he hosted Video Village.

== Gameplay ==
The show featured seven people involved in each episode. Two of the people were players, with one usually a returning champion, and five of the others made up a panel. The second contestant was always a member of the previous show's panel, having qualified to challenge the champion based on their winnings on the previous show. As such, the panel changed on an almost-daily basis. A panelist was limited to two consecutive appearances in the panel without becoming a challenger, and a replacement from a panelist-turned-challenger was chosen from the audience.

=== Main game ===
A question with many possible answers would be posed to everyone (for example: "What makes a camel funny looking?") and an answer that was selected by the show's staff was shown to the challenging player in control of the question and the home audience (with the previous example, "his knobby knees" would be the answer shown). The player decided if the answer would be said by any of the five panelists (yes or no). The player then decided to "play it safe" or go for the "longshot".

Hall then asked the panelists for an answer. If the player played it safe, then he asked each of the panelists for one answer. Should the player call for a longshot, if he or she said yes (that the panelists would get the answer), he only asked three panelists for an answer (or, if the contestant said no, that the panelists wouldn't get the answer, all five panelists were asked for an answer, and the first two were asked for a second answer, for a total of seven answers).

If one of the five panelists guessed the selected answer, he or she received a bonus prize. If the contestant predicted correctly, he or she scored one point (two points for a longshot); an incorrect prediction awarded the point(s) to the opposing player. Five points won the championship.

=== Payoff round ===
One more question is asked to the winner and the panelists. There are two answers (that are not shown to anyone at first) that are chosen by the staff. Hall asks each panelist for a response to the question. Each incorrect response is worth $300. After five responses, if either of the two chosen answers are not given, the player tries for $5,000 in cash and a new car, but the player must eliminate one of the two chosen answers from play.

At this point, the player can quit after each incorrect response with the accumulated cash. If the panelists still do not say the selected answer still in play, the player wins the $5,000 and the car. If one of the two answers were said prior to the halfway mark of the round, but the second response wasn't said after all ten responses, the player just wins the $5,000. If the panelists say both answers, the player loses any cash accumulated in the Payoff Round. Note that a panelist could win more prizes if he or she gives one of the chosen responses.

The panelist who wins the most prizes in the game becomes the new challenger in the next game. Winning contestants were able to compete up to a maximum of five games or until defeated.

== Broadcast history ==
The series replaced Shoot for the Stars at 11:30 AM (Stars moved to Noon) on June 13, 1977. Faced against Love of Life on CBS and Family Feud on ABC, the show ended after 16 weeks. Its replacement was the Arte Johnson game Knockout.

=== Music ===
The music used for the prize descriptions were used on both previous and future versions of Let's Make a Deal, most of which were written by Stan Worth and Sheldon Allman.

The main theme of the show would later be used on the 1980s versions of Deal.

== Episode status ==
For reasons of economy, the series is believed to have been wiped as per the network practice of the era. Only the second Pilot (taped February 4, 1977) and the September 23, 1977 episode are known to exist.
