= Richard Dawson =

British and American actor (1932–2012)

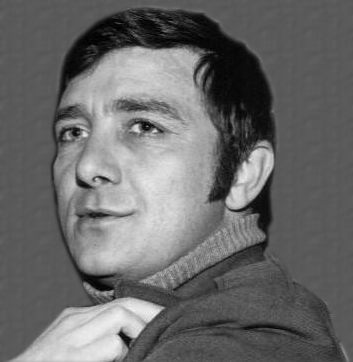
- Dawson on Hogan's Heroes, 1968
- Born: Colin Lionel Emm; 20 November 1932; Gosport, Hampshire, England
- Died: 2 June 2012 (aged 79); Los Angeles, California, US
- Resting place: Westwood Village Memorial Park Cemetery
- Citizenship: United Kingdom; United States (from 1984)
- Occupations: Actor; comedian; game show host; panelist
- Years active: 1954–1995; 2000
- Spouses: Diana Dors (m. 1959; div. 1967) Gretchen Johnson (m. 1991)
- Children: 3, including Mark

Richard Dawson (born Colin Lionel Emm; 20 November 1932 – 2 June 2012) was an English and American actor, comedian, game-show host, and panelist. He was well known for playing Corporal Peter Newkirk in Hogan's Heroes, as a regular panelist on Match Game (1973–1978), and as the original host of Family Feud (1976–1985, 1994–1995).

== Early life ==
Colin Lionel Emm was born in Gosport, Hampshire, England, on 20 November 1932. His father drove a removal van and his mother worked in a munitions factory. Colin and his older brother, John Leslie Emm, were evacuated from their home as children during World War II to escape the bombing of England's major port cities in the south. In a radio interview with Hogan's Heroes co-star Bob Crane, Emm (by this point, known by his changed name) recounted how this experience severely limited his school attendance, stating that he attended school regularly for only two years.

At age 14, Emm ran away from home to join the British Merchant Navy, where he pursued a career in boxing, earning almost $5,000 in shipboard matches. In 1950 and 1951, Emm made several passages on the RMS Mauretania from Southampton to ports of call, including Nassau, the Bahamas, Havana, and New York City. Following his discharge from the merchant service, Emm began pursuing a comedy career using the stage name Dickie Dawson; he later changed his alias to Richard Dawson, which he eventually adopted as his legal name.

== Career ==
=== Comedy and variety artist in the UK ===
Dawson began his career in England as a stand-up comedian known as Dickie Dawson. Possibly his first television appearance occurred on 21 June 1954, at age 21, and was featured on the Benny Hill Showcase, an early BBC Television programme focused on "introducing artists and acts new to television".

Dawson also had at least four BBC Radio programme appearances during 1954, including two bookings on the Midday Music Hall on BBC Home Service and two spots on How Do You Do, a BBC Light Entertainment broadcast billed as "a friendly get-together of Commonwealth artists."

In 1958, Dawson appeared alongside his future wife, Diana Dors, on BBC TV's A to Z: D, a programme featuring entertainers with names beginning with the letter D. The following year, he made four appearances on BBC TV's Juke Box Jury, three of them alongside Dors, to whom he was by then married.

=== Actor and comedian in the US ===
After his move to the US in September 1961, Dawson began hosting a late-night talk show, the Mike Stokey Show, on Los Angeles television station KCOP-TV. On 8 January 1963, Dawson appeared on The Jack Benny Program, season 13, episode 15, as an audience member seated next to Benny, barely recognisable in glasses and false moustache. That same year, Dawson made a guest appearance on The Dick Van Dyke Show (season two, episode 27) playing "Racy" Tracy Rattigan, a lecherous flirt who was the summer replacement host on the Alan Brady Show. He was credited as Dick Dawson.

In 1965, Dawson had a small role at the end of the film King Rat, starring George Segal, playing 1st Recon paratrooper Captain Weaver, sent to liberate allied POWs in a Japanese prison. Dawson had by then moved to Los Angeles. He gained fame in the television show Hogan's Heroes as Cpl. Peter Newkirk from 1965 to 1971. Dawson had a minor role in Universal's Munster, Go Home!. A year later, he released a psychedelic 45-rpm single including the songs "His Children's Parade" and "Apples & Oranges" on Carnation Records. In 1968, Dawson was in the film The Devil's Brigade as Private Hugh McDonald.

Following the cancellation of Hogan's Heroes, Dawson was a regular joke-telling panelist on the short-lived syndicated revival of the game show Can You Top This? in 1970 and joined the cast of Rowan & Martin's Laugh-In that same year.

After Laugh-In was cancelled in 1973, game-show pioneer Mark Goodson signed Dawson to appear as a regular on Match Game '73, alongside Brett Somers, Charles Nelson Reilly, and host Gene Rayburn. Dawson, who had already served a year as panelist for Goodson's revival of I've Got a Secret, proved to be a solid and funny player, and was the frequent choice of contestants to participate in the Head-To-Head Match portion of the "Super-Match" bonus round, in which the contestant and a panelist of the contestant's choice had to match exactly. Dawson was chosen in the bonus round so frequently that they eventually made a rule change where the celebrity partner was randomly selected by having the contestant spin the "Star Wheel" to determine who their partner would be. On its first-ever spin, it landed on Dawson's name. During Dawson's time on Match Game, he most often occupied the bottom centre seat, only sitting elsewhere (in the top centre seat) during one week early in the show's run.

=== Family Feud host and TV stardom ===
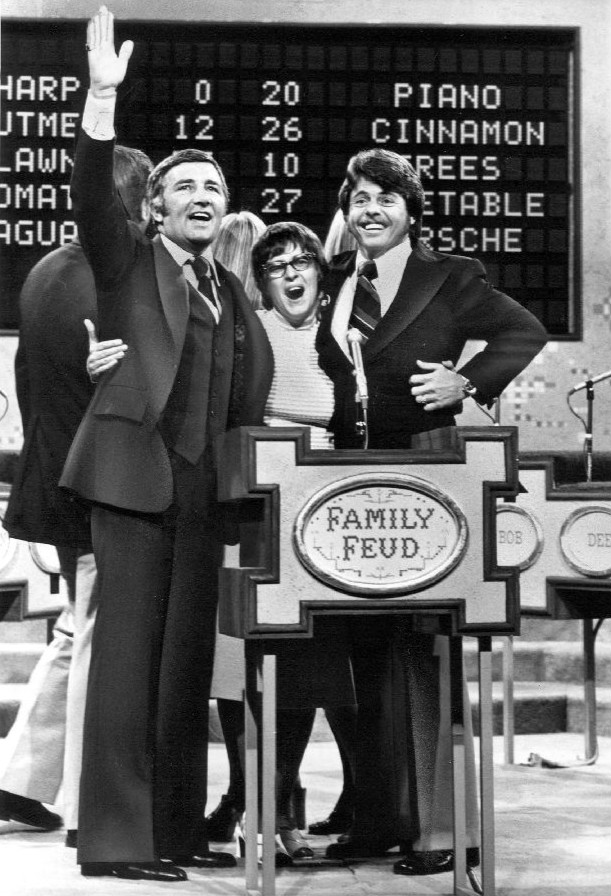
Dawson (left) and contestants on the 1975/1976 pilot episode of Family Feud

Due to his popularity on Match Game, Dawson expressed to Goodson his desire to host a show of his own. In 1975, during Dawson's tenure as one of Match Game's regular panelists, Goodson began developing a spin-off game show, Family Feud, based on the "Super Match" portion of Match Game. Goodson specifically saw the show as a vehicle for Dawson, due to his popularity among Match Game contestants. Family Feud debuted on 12 July 1976, on ABC's daytime schedule. Family Feud was a break-out hit, eventually surpassing the ratings of Match Game in late 1977. In 1978, Dawson left Match Game due to a combination of the recent introduction of the "Star Wheel"—which affected his being selected for the Head-To-Head Match portion of the show's "Super Match" bonus round—and burnout from his regular appearances on both Match Game and Family Feud. That same year, Dawson won a Daytime Emmy Award for Best Game Show Host for his work on Family Feud. After Dawson left Match Game, his spot on the panel was filled with many other stars—most notably his friend Bob Barker, who was then the host of The Price is Right.

One of Dawson's trademarks on Family Feud, kissing the female contestants, earned him the nickname "The Kissing Bandit". Television executives repeatedly tried to get him to stop the kissing. After receiving criticism for the practice (which also included a great deal of physical contact such as holding hands and touching), Dawson asked viewers to write in and vote on the matter. The wide majority of the roughly 200,000 responses favoured the kissing. On the 1985 finale, Dawson explained that he kissed female contestants for love and luck, something his mother did with Dawson himself as a child.

From 1974 to 1975, Dawson hosted the revival of the Masquerade Party with Jay Stewart announcing.

Dawson was a frequent guest host for Tonight Show host Johnny Carson, hosting 14 times during 1979. Dawson was a contender for the role of Tonight Show host in the event that Carson left the show, a move that Carson was seriously considering during 1979–80. Carson ended up remaining as host until 1992. Two of the few Carson-era Tonight Show episodes that did not air on the night they were intended were guest hosted by Dawson. During one, actress Della Reese suffered a near-fatal aneurysm midinterview during taping; the remainder of the episode was cancelled. (Reese later recovered.) The other featured a prescient monologue regarding the danger of flying on airplanes; it was replaced with a rerun because it would have aired the same night as the crash of American Airlines Flight 191 in Chicago, which killed all 271 people aboard, as well as two on the ground. The episode was aired several weeks later.

Dawson also had a few roles as a voice actor, working with Hanna Barbera and having the lead role in Treasure Island (1973) where he voiced Long John Silver. From 1973 to 1974 he had a reuccuring role as Richard Richardson on The New Dick Van Dyke Show.

=== Later years ===
Dawson worked sparingly elsewhere during his game shows years and only made about a half-dozen appearances outside of those 2 shows. After his Family Feud run ended in 1985, his work was still rare to find with the exception of the lone season of his return to Family Feud in 1994-95.

He parodied his TV persona in 1987's The Running Man opposite Arnold Schwarzenegger, portraying the evil, egotistical game-show host Damon Killian. Dawson received rave reviews for his performance. Film critic Roger Ebert (who gave the film a thumbs down) wrote, "Playing a character who always seems three-quarters drunk, he chain-smokes his way through backstage planning sessions and then pops up in front of the cameras as a cauldron of false jollity. Working the audience, milking the laughs and the tears, he is not really much different [from] most genuine game-show hosts—and that's the film's private joke".

Before Dawson was cast as Killian, Chuck Woolery was originally considered for the role, but was unavailable and Schwarzenegger suggested Dawson because he and Dawson were close friends.

Dawson hosted an unsold pilot for a revival of the classic game show You Bet Your Life that was to air on NBC in 1988, but the network declined to pick up the show. In 1990, he auditioned to host the syndicated game show Trump Card; the role went to Jimmy Cefalo.

On 12 September 1994, Dawson returned to Family Feud, hosting what became the last season of the show's second run (1988–1995) after previous host Ray Combs was fired due to spiraling ratings. During his second tenure as host, Dawson did not kiss female contestants because of a promise he had made to his young daughter to kiss only her mother. The show's ratings never recovered under Dawson and the final episode aired on 26 May 1995, after which Dawson officially retired.

Family Feud remained out of production until it was revived for a third run in 1999 with Louie Anderson as the new host. Anderson tried to invite Dawson to make a special appearance on the first episode and give him his blessing. However, Dawson's manager, Leonard Granger, declined the invitation on his behalf.

In 2000, Dawson narrated TV's Funniest Game Shows for the Fox Network in what would prove to be his final public performance.

After moderate success with hosting stints by Richard Karn and John O'Hurley after Anderson in the 2000s, none of which reached the ratings levels experienced during Dawson's tenure, Family Feud became a success again with Steve Harvey hosting from 2010 onward.

== Personal life ==
With his first wife, actress Diana Dors, Dawson had two sons: Mark and Gary. The marriage ended with a divorce granted in Los Angeles in April 1967, and Dawson gained custody of both sons. He had four grandchildren.

In the 1960s and 1970s, Dawson participated in various movements, including the Selma to Montgomery marches and George McGovern's 1972 presidential campaign.

Dawson became a naturalized US citizen in 1984.

Dawson met his second wife, Gretchen Johnson (born 22 September 1955), when she was a contestant on Family Feud in May 1981, and they got married in 1991. Their daughter was born in 1990. Dawson announced the birth and showed a picture of his daughter during the inaugural episode of his second stint as host of Feud in 1994 as he was greeting a contestant who had been a contestant on Match Game when he was a panelist. The episode was featured on the 25th anniversary of Family Feud as number two on the Game Show Network's top 25 Feud moments. Dawson appeared with his daughter on at least two episodes of the show in 1995, including one taped on his birthday.

On retiring, Dawson remained in Beverly Hills, California, where he had lived since 1964.

== Death ==
On 2 June 2012, Dawson died of complications from oesophageal cancer at the Ronald Reagan UCLA Medical Center in Los Angeles, at age 79. Dawson is interred in Westwood Memorial Park in Los Angeles. On 7 June 2012, at the time of Dawson's death, GSN aired a four-hour marathon of Dawson's greatest moments on Match Game and Family Feud, including the first episode of his 1994–95 Feud tenure.

== Filmography ==
=== Film ===
Year	Title	Role	Notes
1962	The Longest Day	British Soldier	Uncredited
1963	Promises! Promises!		Uncredited
1965	King Rat	Weaver	
1966	Out of Sight	Agent	Uncredited
1966	Munster, Go Home!	Joey	
1968	The Devil's Brigade	Pvt. Hugh MacDonald	
1973	Treasure Island	Long John Silver	Voice
1978	How to Pick Up Girls!	Chandler Corey	
1987	The Running Man	Damon Killian	Final film role

=== Television ===
Year	Title	Role	Notes
1954	Benny Hill Showcase	Himself (as Dickie Dawson)	Episode: 1.6
1959	Juke Box Jury	Himself (as Dickie Dawson)	4 episodes
1963	The Jack Benny Program	Man in audience	Episode: "Jack Meets Max Bygraves"
1963	The Dick Van Dyke Show	Tracy Rattigan (credit: Dick Dawson)	Episode: "Racy Tracy Rattigan"
1964	The Outer Limits	Oliver Fair (credit: Dick Dawson)	Episode: "The Invisibles"
1964	The Alfred Hitchcock Hour	Robert Johnson (credit: Dick Dawson)	Episode: "Anyone for Murder?"
1965–1971	Hogan's Heroes	Corporal Peter Newkirk	168 episodes
1967	Mr. Terrific	Max	Episode: "The Formula Is Stolen"
1970	McCloud	Ted Callender	Episode: "The Stage Is All the Word"
1970–1973	Rowan & Martin's Laugh-In	Regular performer	58 episodes (15 uncredited)
1971	Love, American Style	Rick Jagmund	Episode: "Love and the Groupie"
1971	Love, American Style	Danny	Episode: "Love and the Hiccups"
1972	Love, American Style	Melvin Danger	Episode: "Love and the Private Eye"
1972	Wait Till Your Father Gets Home	Claude (voice)	Episode: "The Hippie"
1973–1978	Match Game	Panelist	1,279 episodes
1973–1974	The New Dick Van Dyke Show	Richard Richardson	7 episodes
1974–1975	Masquerade Party	Host	39 episodes
1975	The Odd Couple	Himself	Episode: "Laugh, Clown, Laugh"
1975	McMillan & Wife	Roger Stambler	Episode: "Aftershock"
1976–1985, 1994–1995	Family Feud	Host	3,287 episodes
1978	Fantasy Island	Harry Beamus	Episode: "Call Me Lucky/Torch Singer"
1978	The Love Boat	Bert Buchanan	Episode: "The Song Is Ended"
1979	Bizarre	Host	Pilot episode
1983	Mama's Family	Richard Dawson	Episode: "Family Feud"
2000	TV's Funniest Game Shows	Narrator	

== Awards and nominations ==
Year	Award	Category	Work	Result
1978	Daytime Emmy	Outstanding Host or Hostess in a Game or Audience Participation Show	Family Feud	Won
1980	Daytime Emmy	Outstanding Host or Hostess in a Game or Audience Participation Show	Family Feud	Nominated
1981	Daytime Emmy	Outstanding Host or Hostess in a Game or Audience Participation Show	Family Feud	Nominated
1982	Daytime Emmy	Outstanding Host or Hostess in a Game or Audience Participation Show	Family Feud	Nominated
1983	Daytime Emmy	Outstanding Host or Hostess in a Game or Audience Participation Show	Family Feud	Nominated
1984	Daytime Emmy	Outstanding Host or Hostess in a Game or Audience Participation Show	Family Feud	Nominated
1985	Daytime Emmy	Outstanding Host in a Game Show	Family Feud	Nominated
1988	Saturn Award	Best Supporting Actor	The Running Man	Won
