= Your First Impression =

American television series (1962–1964)

- Presented by: Bill Leyden; Dennis James
- Country of origin: United States

Production
- Running time: 30 minutes

Original release
- Network: NBC
- Release: January 2, 1962 – June 26, 1964

Your First Impression is an NBC daytime game show which aired from January 2, 1962, to June 26, 1964. A panel of three celebrities tried to guess the identity of mystery guests from clues supplied by the host. Bill Leyden was the MC of the program, with Dennis James as a regular panelist or alternating host. Filmed in Burbank, California, Your First Impression was a Monty Hall-Art Stark Production. Hall was the series executive producer. The program aired at Noon Eastern time and followed another game, Concentration, then hosted by Hugh Downs.

Celebrities who appeared on the series included Pat Carroll, Bob Crane, Nina Foch, Ross Martin, Dean Miller, Leslie Nielsen, Inger Stevens, Elena Verdugo, Betty White, and Paul Winchell. Joan Crawford was a mystery guest. Richard Nixon appeared as a mystery guest after his losses to John F. Kennedy for president and Edmund G. (Pat) Brown for governor of California. He got a laugh when he was asked to fill in the blank: "I wish that I __________," and he answered, "had been a PT-boat captain." (This was a reference to Kennedy being the captain of PT-109 during World War II.)
