= Don McGuire (television executive) =

American television executive (died 2020)

Don McGuire (1 Dec 1949 - 19 Mar 2020) was an American television sports executive. McGuire started his career as a radio announcer in Albuquerque, New Mexico. He joined NBC Sports in 1978, initially to produce features for the 1980 Moscow Olympics. He was the feature producer in 1979 on the Michigan State and Indiana State NCAA basketball championship match-up featuring Magic Johnson and Larry Bird. He also produced the telecast of the heavyweight fight between Gerry Coetzee and Randy Stephens - the first competition between a black man and a white man in South Africa. In 1987, McGuire was hired as executive producer of TBS Sports. He was executive producer on the 1992 and 1994 Winter Olympics, the 1991 Pan American Games, the 1990 World Cup, and the 1994 Goodwill Games. Under McGuire's operational direction Turner Sports added the NBA, NFL, PGA and Grand Slam Golf. McGuire was also a consultant on the launch of the Golf Channel and subsequently served as executive producer and later senior vice president for programming, production and operations until the network was taken over by Comcast.

== Early life ==
McGuire was born on 1 December 1949 Albuquerque, New Mexico. He attended the city's Sandia High School, graduating in 1967 before attending the University of Oklahoma where he majored in journalism.

== Career ==
=== University of New Mexico ===
McGuire was an Associate Sports Information Director for the university from 1973 to 1975 before being named press information director for ABC Sports.

=== ABC Sports ===
McGuire started his career as an announcer on radio in Albuquerque, New Mexico. He was discovered by Dick Ebersol while Ebersol was at ABC Sports in 1974 and was one of three finalists for ABC's NCAA Football sideline reporter position, eventually given to Jim Lampley and Don Tollefson.

=== University of New Mexico ===
McGuire was working as a Sports Information Director for the university for the 1975–1977 seasons. He left in August 1977 when he got a job with NBC.

=== NBC Sports and Raycom Sports ===
McGuire joined NBC Sports in 1978, hired by executive producer Don Ohlmeyer to both produce and be talent on Olympic features for the 1980 Moscow Olympics McGuire soon became producer of studio shows for NBC including NCAA basketball and NFL 78 and 79, hosted by Bryant Gumbel.

McGuire left NBC after that network lost TV rights to the NCAA Basketball Championships but was the feature producer in 1979 on the highest-rated college game ever, the Magic Johnson versus Larry Bird championship between Michigan State and Indiana State. McGuire is featured in Seth Davis' book "When March Went Mad" about the Bird/Johnson game in 1979. For NBC, McGuire produced the telecast of the history-making heavyweight fight in Johannesburg between Gerry Coetzee and Randy Stephens- the first competition between a black man and a white man in South Africa. He was coordinating producer for the 1979 US Olympic Festival and all the 1980 US Olympic Trials events.

McGuire helped start Raycom Sports in 1983 producing hundreds of college football and basketball games yearly for syndication.

=== Turner Sports ===
In 1987, he was hired by Robert Wussler to be executive producer of TBS Sports. He was executive producer on the 1992 and 1994 Winter Olympics, the 1991 Pan American Games from Havana, Cuba, the 1990 World Cup from Italy and the 1994 Goodwill Games from St Petersburg Russia. Under McGuire's operational direction Turner Sports added the NBA, NFL, PGA and Grand Slam Golf. He was senior executive for sports on the launch of TNT and in the launch of SportSouth. He created the first live, onsite football pregame show—The Silver Bullet Stadium Show—before NFL on TNT broadcasts.

He was the executive who first hired Doug Collins, Hubie Brown, Chuck Daly, Don Sutton, Ernie Johnson Jr, Magic Johnson and Charles Barkley at TNT.

McGuire consulted to Golf Channel founder Joe Gibbs in 1995 on the launch of that network and subsequently served as executive producer and later senior vice president for programming, production and operations until the network was taken over by Comcast.

== Death ==
McGuire died on 19 March 2020 in Little Elm, Texas. He was survived by his wife and three sons.
