= Monty Hall =

Canadian-American game show host (1921–2017)

Monty Hall OC OM
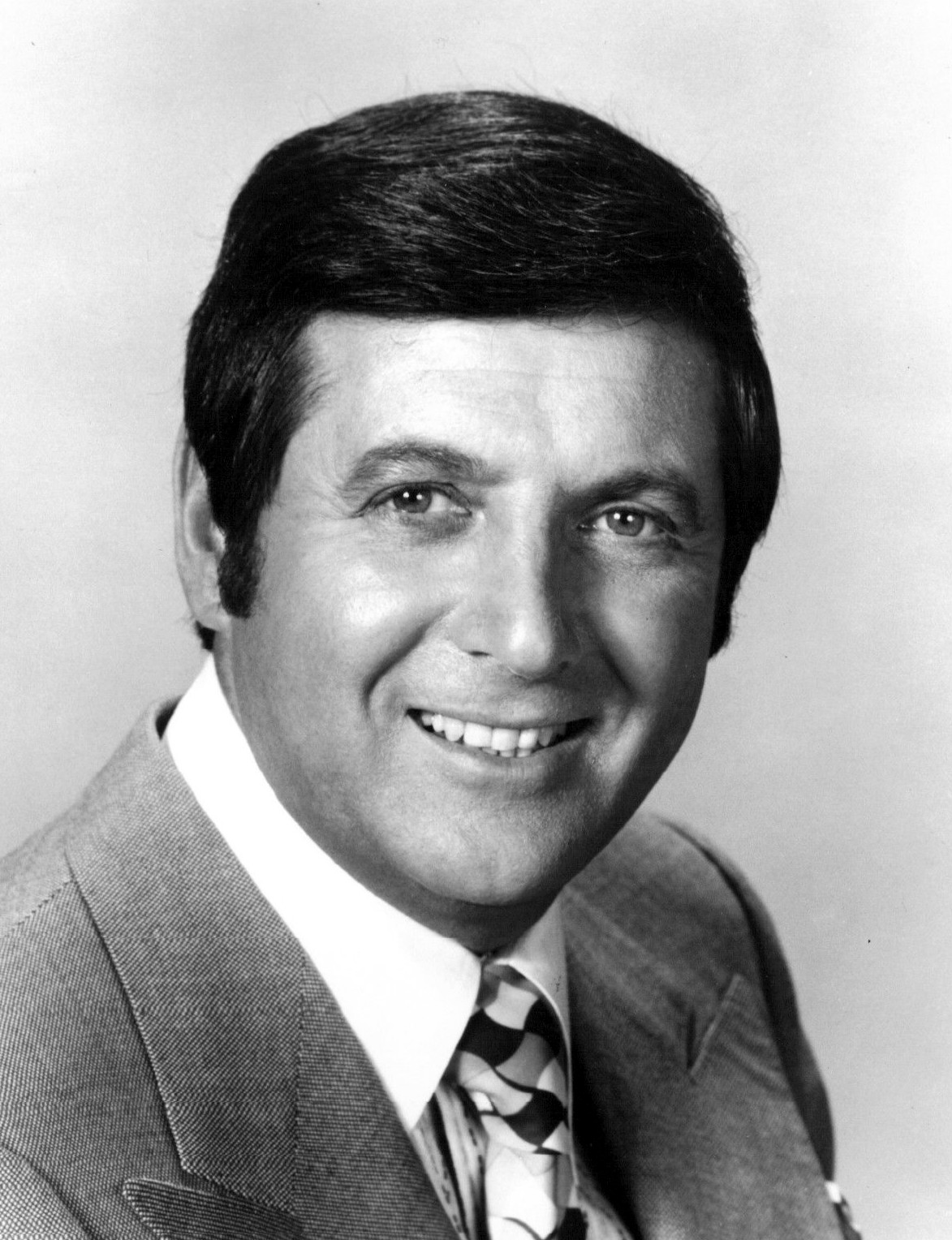
- Hall in 1976
- Born: Monte Halparin; August 25, 1921; Winnipeg, Manitoba, Canada
- Died: September 30, 2017 (aged 96); Beverly Hills, California, U.S.
- Resting place: Hillside Memorial Park Cemetery
- Education: University of Manitoba (BSc)
- Occupations: Game show host; producer
- Years active: 1946–2017
- Spouse: Marilyn Plottel (m. 1947; died 2017)
- Children: 3, including Joanna Gleason
- Relatives: Maggie Tokuda-Hall (granddaughter); Wendy Tokuda (daughter-in-law); Jeff Margolis (nephew)

Monty Hall OC OM (born Monte Halparin; August 25, 1921 – September 30, 2017) was a Canadian-American radio and television show host who moved to the United States in 1955 to pursue a career in broadcasting. After working as a radio newsreader and sportscaster, Hall returned to television in the U.S., where his focus was now on hosting game shows. Starting in 1963, he was best known as the host, co-creator, and co-producer of Let's Make a Deal. A conundrum involving game theory and psychology was named after him: the Monty Hall problem. Behind the scenes, Hall also carried on an active life of philanthropy.

== Early life ==
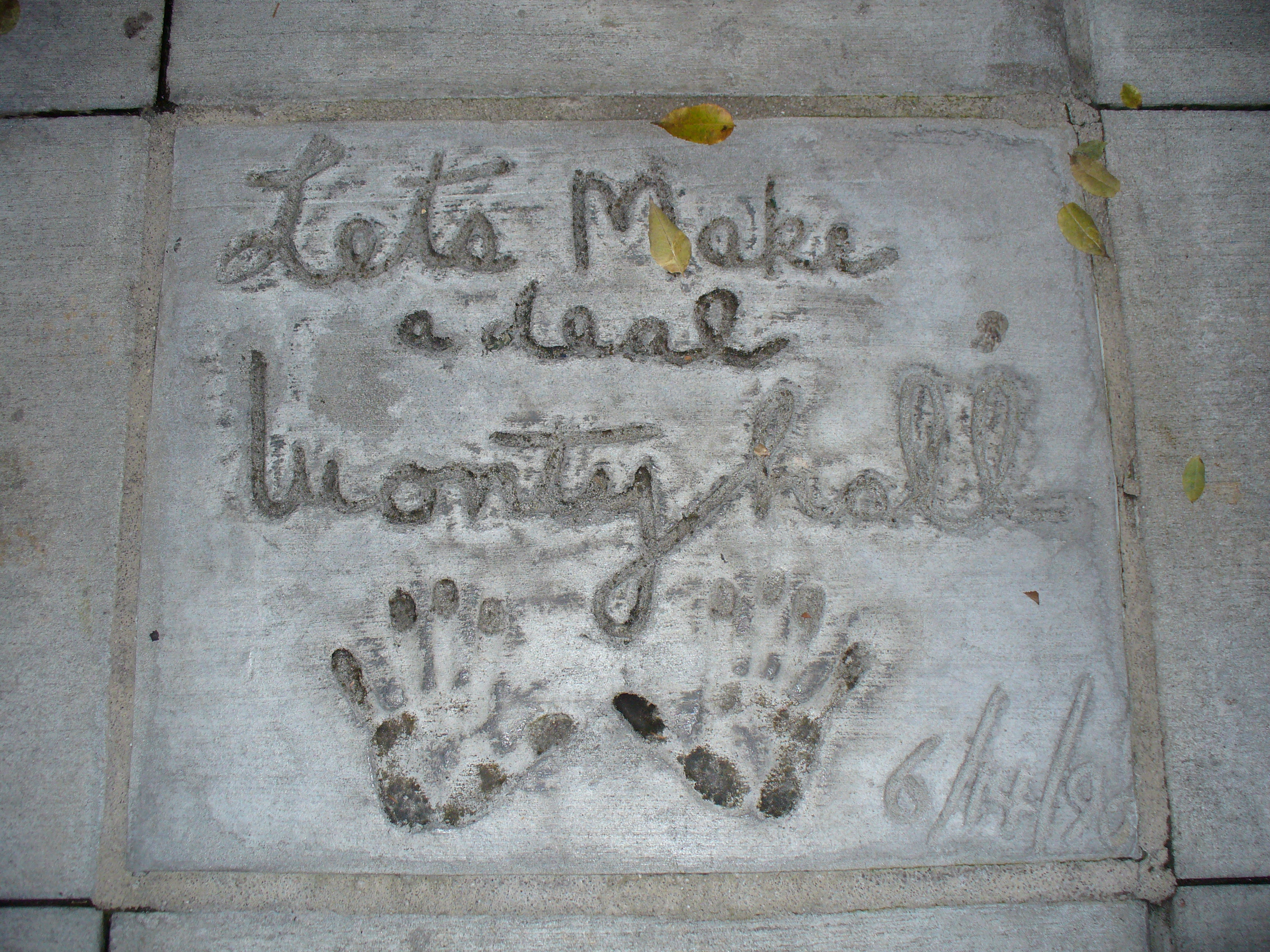
The handprints of Hall in front of Hollywood Hills Amphitheater at Walt Disney World's Disney's Hollywood Studios theme park

Hall was born as Monte Halparin in Winnipeg, Manitoba, on August 25, 1921, to Orthodox Jewish parents Maurice Harvey Halparin, who owned a slaughterhouse, and Rose (née Rusen). He was raised in Winnipeg's north end, where he attended Lord Selkirk School (Elmwood, Winnipeg), and, later St. John's High School. Hall graduated with a Bachelor of Science degree from the University of Manitoba, where he majored in chemistry and zoology. He was sponsored through university by Max Freed, a local businessman who was a customer of his father. Originally though, Hall had hoped to go to medical school but was not admitted due to secret quotas restricting the number of Jewish students admitted. Hall could speak Yiddish.

== Career ==
Hall's first radio job was working for CKRC radio in Winnipeg while still a student. He briefly worked for the Canadian Wheat Board after graduating before deciding to pursue a full-time career in broadcasting. He moved to Toronto in 1946 and found a job with radio station CHUM, where management shortened his name to Hall and misspelled his first name as "Monty" on billboards, giving him the stage name "Monty Hall". For the next decade he hosted and produced a number of programs for radio stations in Toronto, as well as Who Am I? on CFRB, which was distributed nationally in Canada through private syndication until 1959. He also had several short-lived programmes on CBC Television after it was launched in 1952, but when they were cancelled and another program he had conceived was taken away from him, Hall decided he had no future in Canadian television.

Hall moved to New York City in 1955, attempting to break into American broadcasting, but commuted to Toronto several times a month to record episode blocks of Who Am I? In New York, Hall hosted game shows such as Bingo at Home on WABD-TV and guest-hosted more established game shows such as Strike It Rich on CBS and Twenty-One on NBC. On September 15, 1956, Hall began a seven-month stint hosting the Saturday afternoon series Cowboy Theater, broadcast nationally on the NBC network. Hall's segments were performed live from NBC's New York studio, and the films were Columbia Pictures' 1935-42 westerns starring Charles Starrett.

Hall later hosted the children's program Fun in the Morning for WNEW-TV (Ch. 5) in the early 1960s. From 1956 to 1960, along with NBC Radio newsman Morgan Beatty, Hall co-hosted the Saturday night segment of the NBC Radio Network weekend program Monitor from 8 p.m. until midnight (EST). At least two recordings of Hall on Monitor are known to exist.

Hall was a radio analyst for the New York Rangers of the National Hockey League during the 1959–1960 season.

He succeeded Jack Narz as host of a game show called Video Village, which ran from 1960 to 1962 on CBS. From 1961 to 1962, Hall hosted its spinoff, Video Village Junior, which featured children. After moving to Southern California, Hall became the host of the game show Let's Make a Deal, which he developed and produced with partner Stefan Hatos.

Let's Make a Deal aired on NBC daytime from December 30, 1963, to December 27, 1968, and on ABC daytime from December 30, 1968, until July 9, 1976, along with two prime time runs. It aired in syndication from 1971 to 1977, from 1980 to 1981, from 1984 to 1986, and again on NBC briefly from 1990 to 1991, with Hall replacing Bob Hilton, who had been dismissed. He was the producer or executive producer of the show through most of its runs. During the show's initial run, Hall appeared alongside model Carol Merrill and announcer Jay Stewart. In 1969, he guest-starred on season 4, episode 5, of That Girl, playing Dr. Pellman, a dentist.

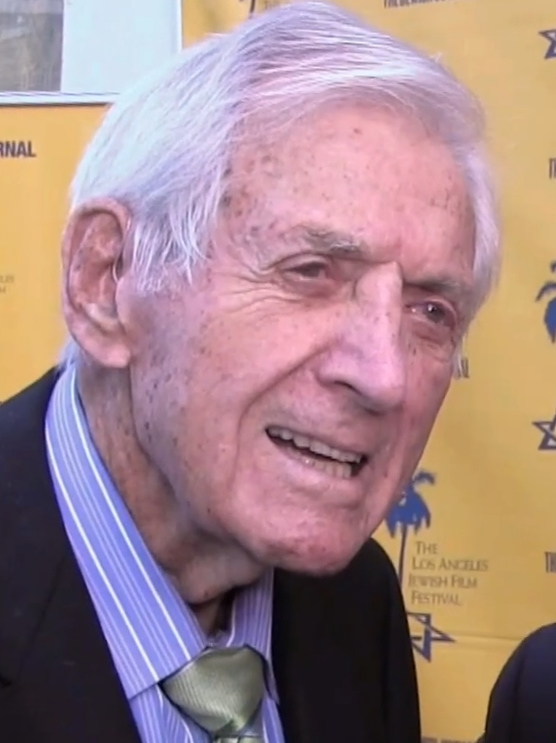
Hall at the 2017 Los Angeles Jewish Film Festival

Besides Let's Make a Deal, the game show Split Second, which originally ran on ABC from 1972 to 1975 with Tom Kennedy as host, and again in syndication in 1986 with Hall hosting that version, was the only other successful program from Hatos-Hall Productions. In 1975, he published his autobiography, co-authored with Bill Libby, called Emcee Monty Hall. Other game shows from Hatos' and Hall's production company included Chain Letter in 1966; a revival of the venerable 1950s-era panel quiz Masquerade Party in 1974; Three for the Money in 1975; It's Anybody's Guess in 1977, which reunited Let's Make a Deal announcer Jay Stewart with Hall, who also hosted the show; and the Canadian-based The Joke's on Us in 1983. Hall filled in as guest host on several daytime game shows while Let's Make a Deal was on NBC, most notably What's This Song? and PDQ.

In 1979, Hall hosted the only game show since Video Village which he did not produce, Goodson-Todman's All-New Beat the Clock. Also, in 1979, Hall made an appearance on the game show Password Plus as a game show contestant, followed by another week of appearances in August 1980 (just before the launch of the upcoming Canadian-produced Let's Make a Deal revival, which he took the opportunity to plug). He appeared as himself on "The Promise Ring" episode of That '70s Show in 2001. He played the host of a beauty pageant who schemed to become "the world's most powerful game show host" in the Disney animated series American Dragon: Jake Long. He appeared on GSN Live on March 14, 2008, and hosted a game of Let's Make a Deal for Good Morning America on August 18, 2008, as part of Game Show Reunion week.

In summer 2009, CBS announced that it was reviving Let's Make a Deal on its daytime schedule. The show premiered on October 5, 2009, with Wayne Brady as host. Hall was credited as "Creative Consultant" until he died in 2017, and remains credited as co-creator of the format (with Stefan Hatos), as per many international versions of the show, with Hatos/Hall Productions being credited as co-production company (with Fremantle). Hall made appearances in 2010 and 2013 during the Brady run, and had been part of publicity photos in early 2017 to promote season nine.

== Philanthropy ==
Hall spent much of his off time involved in philanthropic work. His family says he was always going to telethons and helped raise close to $1 billion for charity in his lifetime. Hall was repeatedly honored for his charitable efforts. Wards at Mount Sinai Hospital in Toronto and Hahnemann University Hospital in Philadelphia are named in his honor.Hall, who said that charitable work was the driving force in his life, even went so far as to conceive a television series where he would assist people who were having troubles through various connections he had made through his philanthropic efforts.

In 1985, while still hosting The All-New Let's Make a Deal in syndication, Hall began work on his new project, which was to be titled For the People and distributed by Worldvision Enterprises. His plan was to keep Let's Make a Deal in production under a new host while focusing most of his time on For the People, and both shows were presented for station owners at the 1986 NATPE convention. Although the pilot episode was not well received, Hall pressed forward with For the People until he eventually decided to put the project on hold in June 1986 after For the People had not gotten enough stations to sign on to carry it. Hall vowed that he would try again, but ultimately For the People was never brought to series. (Hall also failed to get enough interest for a third season of Let's Make a Deal, which resulted in its cancellation at the end of the 1985-86 season; he pressed on with his revival of Split Second, which ran for nineteen weeks beginning in December 1986 before it too would not be renewed.)

== Honours ==
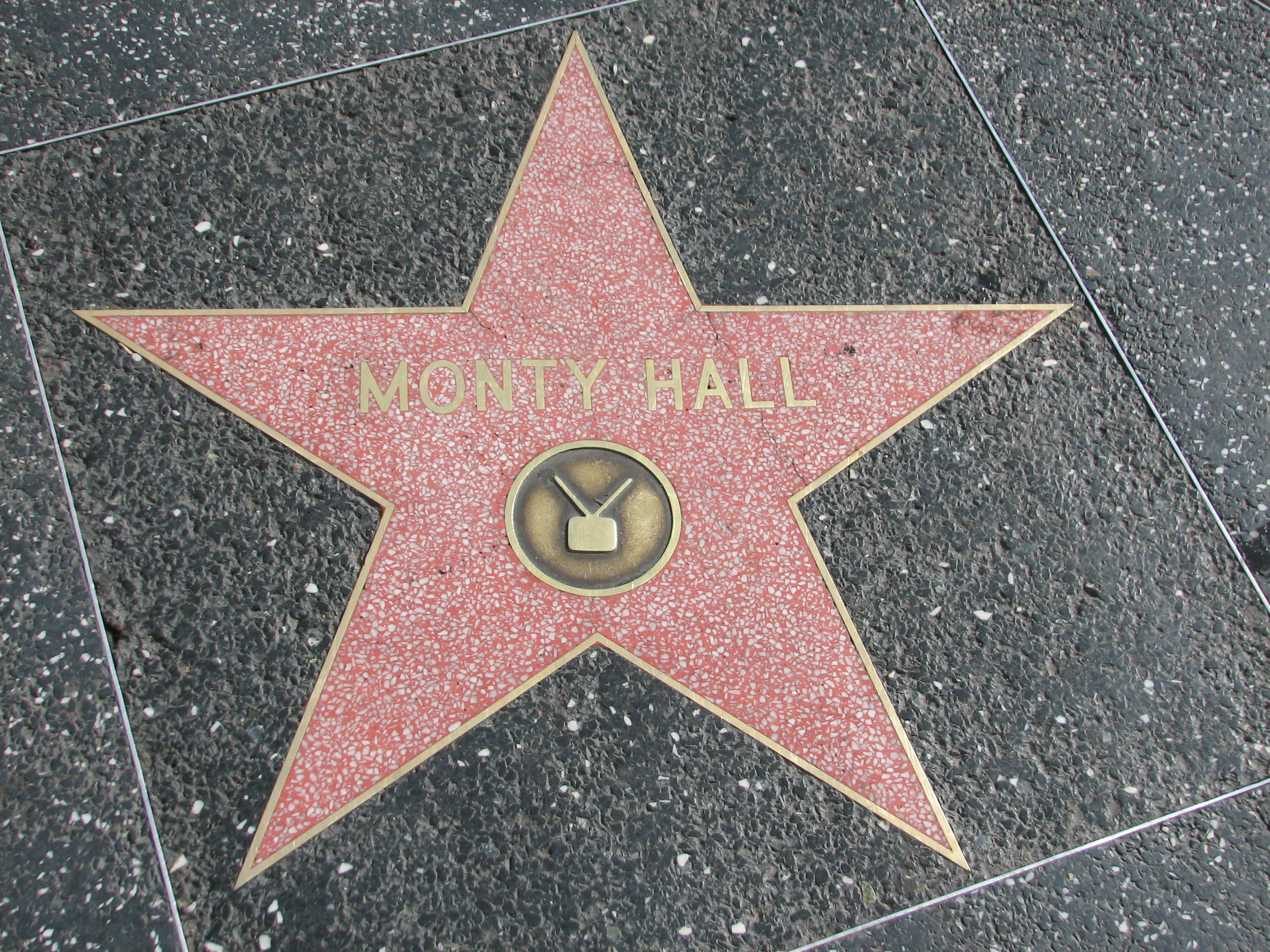
Hall's star on Hollywood Walk of Fame

Hall received a star on the Hollywood Walk of Fame on August 24, 1973, a Golden Palm Star on the Palm Springs, California, Walk of Stars in 2000, and in 2002, he was inducted into Canada's Walk of Fame.

Hall is one of three game show hosts—along with Alex Trebek and Howie Mandel—on both Hollywood's and Canada's Walks of Fame. In May 1988, Her Excellency Jeanne Sauvé, Governor General of Canada, appointed him an Officer of the prestigious Order of Canada for his humanitarian work in Canada and other nations of the world. In 2003, His Honour the Honourable Peter Liba, Lieutenant Governor of Manitoba, appointed him a Member of the Order of Manitoba.

He was the recipient of the 2005 Ralph Edwards Service Award from the Game Show Congress, in recognition of all the work the emcee-producer has done for charity through the years. On October 13, 2007, Hall was one of the first inductees into the American TV Game Show Hall of Fame in Las Vegas, Nevada. Hall received the Lifetime Achievement Award at the 2013 Daytime Emmy Awards.

== Personal life ==
On September 28, 1947, Hall married Marilyn Doreen Plottel (May 17, 1927 – June 5, 2017); the two had been introduced by a mutual cousin, Norman Shnier, the previous year. They later became United States citizens. They had three children: Tony Award–winning actress Joanna Gleason; Sharon Hall Kessler, a former producer and now an executive at Marcus/Glass Entertainment, which acquired Hatos-Hall Productions in 2021, including Let's Make a Deal, allowing the show to return to family control; and Richard Hall, an Emmy Award–winning television producer. Monty and Marilyn lived in Beverly Hills, California, from 1962 until their deaths; Marilyn died four months before her husband.

=== Death ===
Hall died from heart failure on September 30, 2017, at his home in Beverly Hills a little over a month after his 96th birthday. He was interred at Hillside Memorial Park Cemetery on October 3.

The October 6, 2017, episode of the current Let's Make a Deal on CBS hosted by Wayne Brady paid tribute to Hall with this opening:

Last week, we lost the creator and the original host of Let's Make a Deal, Mr. Monty Hall. Now, we all know that Monty was a great host, but he was a great man as well, in every single sense of the word. He was a philanthropist who raised hundreds of millions of dollars for charities and, even more important than his charitable work, he was a family man. He loved his family. Monty made everyone feel special. He was an inspiration to people that he'd meet on the street. He was an inspiration to myself and everyone here on the set of Let's Make a Deal. He would come by, he'd visit us, we'd laugh and it was absolute magic. He absolutely loved the show, this show, which he created 54 years ago. So today, we're celebrating his memory with this episode and we're gonna do what we know that Monty would want us to do: we're gonna have fun, we're gonna make deals, and we're gonna change lives. Monty, we're gonna celebrate your legacy and this show is for you. Thank you!

== Monty Hall Problem ==
Hall's name is used in a probability puzzle known as the "Monty Hall problem". The name was conceived by statistician Steve Selvin who used the title in describing a probability problem to Scientific American in 1975 based on one of the games on Let's Make a Deal, and more popularized when it was presented in a weekly national newspaper column by Marilyn vos Savant in 1990.

A host ("Monty") provides a player with three doors, one containing a valuable prize and the other two containing a "gag" valueless prize. The contestant is offered a choice of one of the doors without knowledge of the content behind them. "Monty", who knows which door has the prize, opens a door that the player did not select that has a gag prize, and then offers the player the option to switch from their choice to the other remaining unopened door. The probability problem arises from asking if the player should switch to the unrevealed door.

Mathematically, the problem shows that a player switching to the other door has a 2/3 chance of winning under standard conditions, but this is a counterintuitive effect of switching one's choice of doors, and the problem gained wide attention due to conflicting views following Marilyn vos Savant's publication, with many asserting that the probability of winning had dropped to 1/2 if one switched. A number of other solutions become possible if the problem setup is outside of the "standard conditions" defined by Marilyn vos Savant: that the host equally selects one of the two gag prize doors if the player had first picked the winning prize, and the offer to switch is always presented.

Hall explained the solution to that problem in an interview with The New York Times reporter John Tierney in 1991. In the article, Hall pointed out that because he had control over the way the game progressed, playing on the psychology of the contestant, the theoretical solution did not apply to the show's actual gameplay. He said he was not surprised at the experts' insistence that the probability was 1 out of 2. "That's the same assumption contestants would make on the show after I showed them there was nothing behind one door," he said. "They'd think the odds on their door had now gone up to 1 in 2, so they hated to give up the door no matter how much money I offered. By opening that door we were applying pressure. We called it the Henry James treatment. It was 'The Turn of the Screw.'" Hall clarified that as a game show host, he was not required to follow the rules of the puzzle as Marilyn vos Savant often explains in her weekly column in Parade, and did not always allow a person the opportunity to switch. For example, he might open their door immediately if it was a losing door, might offer them money to not switch from a door leading to a loss to a door leading to a win, or might only allow them the opportunity to switch if they had a winning door. "If the host is required to open a door all the time and offer you a switch, then you should take the switch," he said. "But if he has the choice whether to allow a switch or not, beware. Caveat emptor. It all depends on his mood."
