= 1978 in poetry =

Nationality words link to articles with information on the nation's poetry or literature (for instance, Irish or France).

== Events ==
- Bloodaxe Books is established by Neil Astley in Newcastle upon Tyne, England
- L=A=N=G=U=A=G=E magazine, edited by Bruce Andrews and Charles Bernstein, is first published in the United States
- Stevie, a film based on a play about the poet Stevie Smith is released
- The Science Fiction Poetry Association is established along with the Rhysling Awards.

== Works published in English ==
Listed by nation where the work was first published and again by the poet's native land, if different; substantially revised works listed separately:

=== Canada ===
- Margaret Avison, Sunblue
- Earle Birney, Fall by Fury & Other Makings. Toronto: McClelland and Stewart.
- Dionne Brand, Fore Day Morning: Poems
- William Wilfred Campbell, Vapour and Blue: Souster selects Campbell. Raymond Souster ed. Paget Press.
- Leonard Cohen, Death of a Lady's Man
- Don Domanski, Heaven
- Phyllis Gotlieb, The Works: Collected Poems
- George Benson Johnston, Taking a Grip: Poems 1971-78.
- Irving Layton, The Love Poems of Irving Layton. Toronto: Canadian Fine Editions.
- Irving Layton, The Tightrope Dancer. Toronto: McClelland and Stewart.
- Dennis Lee, The Gods. Vancouver: Kanchenjunga Press.
- Pat MacKay, The Pat Lowther Poem
- Sean O'Huigin, The Inks and the Pencils and the Looking Back
- Michael Ondaatje, Elimination Dance/La danse eliminatoire, Ilderton: Nairn Coldstream; revised edition, Brick, 1980
- Craig Powell, Rehearsal for Dancers
- Al Purdy, Being Alive
- Joe Rosenblatt, Loosely Tied Hands. Black Moss.
- A.J.M. Smith The Classic Shade: Selected Poems
- Peter Trower, Bush Poems
- Sean Virgo, Deathwatch on Skidegate Narrows
- Miriam Waddington, Mister Never
- Wilfred Watson, I Begin With Counting
- George Woodcock:
  - The Kestrel and Other Poems of Past and Present. Sunderland, Durham: Coelfrith Press, Canada
  - Thomas Merton, Monk and Poet: A Critical Study, Vancouver: Douglas & McIntyre, and Seattle: University of Washington Press, criticism

=== India in English ===
- K. R. Srinivasa Iyengar, Microcosmographia Poetica, Calcutta: Writers Workshop, India .
- Ketaki Kushari Dyson, Sap-wood, Calcutta: Writers Workshop, India.
- Margaret Chatterjee, The Sound of Wings, New Delhi: Arnold-Heinemann

=== Ireland ===
- Seamus Heaney, After Summer, Gallery Press, Northern Ireland poet published in Dublin
- Thomas McCarthy, The First Convention, including "State Funeral" Dublin: Dolmen Press
- Tom Paulin, Personal Column, Northern Ireland poet published in the United Kingdom

=== New Zealand ===
- Alan Brunton, Oh Ravachol, Red Mole

=== United Kingdom ===
- Peter Ackroyd, Country Life
- Al Alvarez, Autumn to Autumn and Selected Poems 1953–1976
- Gillian Clarke, The Sundial, Welsh
- D. J. Enright, Paradise Illustrated
- Gavin Ewart, All My Little Ones (see also More Little Ones 1982)
- James Fenton, A Vacant Possession, poems, TNR Publications
- Roy Fisher, The Thing About Joe Sullivan
- Geoffrey Grigson, The Fiesta and Other Poems
- Tony Harrison, From the School of Eloquence, and Other Poems
- Seamus Heaney, After Summer, Gallery Press, Northern Ireland poet published in the United Kingdom
- John Heath-Stubbs, The Watchman's Flute
- Geoffrey Hill, Tenebrae, including the sonnet sequences "Lachrimae" and "An Apology for the Revival of Christian Architecture in England"
- Ted Hughes:
  - Cave Birds
  - Moon-Bells, and Other Poems, for children
- A. Norman Jeffares, W. B. Yeats: Man And Poet, United Kingdom, biography, revision of the first edition of 1948
- Jenny Joseph, The Thinking Heart
- Philip Larkin, Femmes Damnees
- Liz Lochhead, Islands
- George MacBeth, Buying a Heart (first published in the United States 1977)
- Hugh MacDiarmid, pen name of Christopher Murray Grieve (died September 9), Collected Poems 1920–1976, two volumes (posthumous)
- John Montague, The Great Cloak
- Andrew Motion, The Pleasure Steamers
- Norman Nicholson, The Shadow of Black Combe
- Tom Paulin, Personal Column, Northern Ireland poet published in the United Kingdom
- Craig Raine, The Onion, Memory
- Tom Rawling, A Sort of Killing
- Carol Rumens, A Necklace of Mirrors
- Jon Stallworthy, A Familiar Tree
- D. M. Thomas, The Honeymoon Voyage
- R. S. Thomas, Frequencies
- Jeffrey Wainwright, Heart's Desire

=== United States ===
- Maya Angelou, And Still I Rise
- Paul Blackburn (died 1971), translator, Proensa: An Anthology of Troubadour Poetry
- Joseph Payne Brennan, As Evening Advances (Crystal Visions Press)
- Robert Creeley:
  - Hello
  - Later
- Ed Dorn:
  - Hello, La Jolla, Wingbow Press, ISBN 978-0-914728-24-5
  - Selected Poems, edited by Donald Allen, Grey Fox Press
- Cynthia Dubin Edelberg, Robert Creeley's Poetry: A Critical Introduction, Albuquerque, New Mexico (criticism)
- Nikki Giovanni, Cotton Candy on a Rainy Day
- John Hollander, Spectral Emanations
- bell hooks, And There We Wept: poems
- James McMichael, The Lover’s Familiar
- James Merrill, Mirabell: Books of Number
- W. S. Merwin, Feathers From the Hill, Iowa City, Iowa: Windhover
- Eugenio Montale, The Storm & Other Poems, translated by Charles Wright into English from the original Italian; Oberlin College Press, ISBN 0-932440-01-0
- Mary Oliver:
  - The Night Traveler
  - Twelve Moons
- George Oppen, Primitive (Black Sparrow Press)
- Mary Oppen (George Oppen's wife), Meaning a Life, a memoir (Black Sparrow Press)
- Adrienne Rich, The Dream of a Common Language
- Peter Seaton, Agreement (New York: Asylum's Press and Eclipse Archive)
- Patti Smith, Babel
- William Stafford, Stories That Could Be True
- Mark Strand, The Late Hour, Canadian native living in and published in the United States
- Rosmarie Waldrop, The Road Is Everywhere or Stop This Body (Open Places)
- James Wright, To a Blossoming Pear Tree
- Louis Zukofsky:
  - A (University of California Press)
  - 80 Flowers

=== Other in English ===
- Jennifer Maiden, Birthstones, Angus & Robertson, Australia

== Works in other languages ==
Listed by language and often by nation where the work was first published and again by the poet's native land, if different; substantially revised works listed separately:

=== Arabic language ===
- Nazir Qabbani, Syrian:
  - I Love You, and the Rest is to Come
  - To Beirut the Feminine, With My Love
  - May You Be My Love For Another Year

=== French language ===
==== France ====
- Noureddine Aba, Gazelle au petit matin, Algerian writer
- Yves Bonnefoy, Poèmes (1947–1975)
- Jean-Pierre Faye, Verres
- Jean Daive, Le cri-cerveau
- Philippe Denis, Revif
- Emmanuel Hocquard, Les Dernieres nouvelles de l'expédition sont datées du 15 février 17 [...]
- Edmond Jabès, Le Soupçon Le Désert
- Joyce Mansour, Faire Signe au machiniste
- Robert Marteau, Traité du blanc et des tientures
- Yves Martin, Je fais bouillir mon vin
- Claude Royet-Journoud, La Notion d'obstacle
- Jean Max Tixier, editor, Poètes de sud, anthology; publisher: Rijois
- Alain Veinstein, Vers l'absence de soutien

==== Canada ====
- Marcel Bélanger:
  - Fragments paniques
  - Infranoir
- Normand de Bellefeuille, La Belle Conduite

=== German language ===
==== Germany ====
- Alfred Andersch, Empōrt euch der Himmel ist blau
- Ingeborg Bachmann, works, in a four-volume edition
- Konrad Beyer, Gesamtwerk
- Nicolas Born, Gedichte 1967-1978
- Erich Fried, Die bunten Getûme
- J. Hans, U. Herms, and R. Thenior, Lyrik-Katalog Bundesrepublik, anthology
- Thomas Mann, Tagebücher 1933-1934
- Johannes Schenk, Zittern
- Kurt Tucholsky, Die Q-Tagebücher 1934-1935

===== Criticism, scholarship and biography in Germany =====
- Walter Hinck, Von Heine zu Brecht. Lyrik im Geschichtsprozess (scholarship)
- Walter Hinderer, editor, Gesch. der politschen Lyrik in Deutschland, Stuttgart (scholarship)
- William H. Rey, Poesie der Antipoesie: Moderne deutsche Lyrik Genesis, Theorie, Struktur, Heidelberg, ISBN 3-7988-0520-2 (scholarship)

=== Hebrew language ===
- D. Avidan, a poetry book
- P. Sadeh, a poetry book
- E. Megged, a poetry book
- M. Ben-Shaul, a poetry book
- Zelda (poet), a poetry book

=== India ===
Listed in alphabetical order by first name:

- Buddhidhari Singha, Smrti-Sahasri, a kavya, Maithili-language
- Debarati Mitra, Jubaker Snan, Kolkata: Ananda Publishers, Kolkata; Bengali-language
- Dilip Chitre, Kavitenantarchya Kavita, Vacha Prakashan, Aurangabad; Marathi-language
- Jaya Mehta, Venetian Blind; Indian poet writing in Gujarati
- K. Satchidanandan, Indian Sketchukal ("Indian Sketches"); Malayalam-language
- K. Siva Reddy, Netra Dhanussu, Hyderabad: Jhari Poetry Circle, Telugu-language
- Nirendranath Chakravarti, Aaj Shokaaley, Kolkata: Ananda Publishers; Bengali-language
- Sitanshu Yashaschandra, Moe-n jo dado poems read on cassette; Gujarati-language
- Varavara Rao (better known as "VV"), Swechcha or Svecha ("Freedom"), Hyderabad: Yuga Prachuranalu; Telugu-language

=== Italy ===
- Mario Luzi, Al Fuoco della controversia
- Leonardo Sinisgalli, Dimenticatoio
- Eugenio Montale, Tutte le poesie
- Franco Fortini, Una volta per sempre, poesie 1938-1973

=== Norway ===
- Hans Børli, Dag og Drøm: Dikt i utvalg ("Day and Dream") (Norway)
- Paal Brekke, Dikt 1949-1722 (Norway)
- Halldis Moren Vesaas, Dikt i samling (Norway)

=== Poland ===
- Stanisław Barańczak, Sztuczne oddychanie ("Artificial Respiration"), London: Aneks
- Ryszard Krynicki, Nasze zycie rośnie. Wiersze ("Our Life is Growing: Poems"); Paris: Instytut Literacki
- Ewa Lipska, Piaty wybor wierszy ("Fifth Collection of Verse"); Warsaw: Czytelnik
- Z. Jarosiński and H. Zawarska, editors, Antologia polskiego futuryzmu i Nowej Sztuki, anthology
- Adam Zagajewski, List ("A Letter"), Poznañ: Od Nowa

=== Portuguese language ===
- Rui Knopfli, O Escriba Acocorado (Portugal)
- Waldimir Diniz, Até o 8° round (Brazilian)
- Cassiano Nunes, Madrugada (Brazilian)
- Accioly Lopes, his first volume of verse (Brazilian)

=== Spanish language ===
==== Spain ====
- Eduardo Haro Ibars, Perdiddas blancas
- Féliz de Asúa, Pasar y siete canciones (he also published a novel this year, Les lecciones suspendidas)
- Luis Antonio de Villena, Viaje a Bizancio
- Pere Gimferrer, a collection of his verse translated from Catalan to Castilian by the author
- García Hortelano, editor, anthology of verse by the Generation of the '50s, including Caballero Bonald, Ángel González, Jaime Gil de Biedma, Carlos Barral

==== Latin America ====
- Alfonso Calderón, Poemas para Clavecin ("Poems for Harpsichord"), Chile
- Arturo Corcuera, Los Amantes, Peru
- Oscar Hahn, Arte de morir
- Pablo Neruda (died 1973), Para nacer he nacido, previously unpublished diary entries, memoirs and other writings, put out by his widow, Matilde de Neruda and Miguel Otero Silva (of Venezuela)
- Luis Alberto Spinetta, Guitarra Negra (Black Guitar) - first edition of the only book written by the singer Luis Alberto Spinetta of Argentina.

=== Sweden ===
- Tomas Tranströmer, Sanningsbarriāren
- Tobias Berggren, Bergsmusik
- Eva Runefelt, Aldriga och barnsliga trakter

=== Yiddish ===
- Shloyme Roitman, a poetry book
- Rachel Boymvol, a poetry book
- Jacob Shargel, a poetry book
- Chaim Plotkin, a poetry book

=== Other ===
- Odysseus Elytis, Μαρία Νεφέλη ("Maria Nefeli"), Greece
- Joseph Brodsky, editor of two expatriate Russian poetry anthologies:
  - Konets prekrasnoy epokh: Stikhotvoreniya 1964-71
  - Chast' rechi: Stkikhotvoreniya 1972-76
- Klaus Høeck, Denmark:
  - Skygger, publisher: Swing
  - Topia eller Che Guevara
- Seán Ó Ríordáin, Tar éis mo Bháis ("After my Death"), Ireland
- Sjón, Sýnir ("Visions"), Iceland

== Awards and honors ==
=== Canada ===
- See 1978 Governor General's Awards for a complete list of winners and finalists for those awards.

=== United Kingdom ===
- Cholmondeley Award: Christopher Hope, Leslie Norris, Peter Reading, D. M. Thomas, R. S. Thomas
- Eric Gregory Award: Ciaran Carson, Peter Denman, Christopher Reid, Paul Wilkins, Martyn A. Ford, James Sutherland-Smith

=== United States ===
- AML Award for "Poetry Honorable Mention" Clinton F. Larson for "The Western World " and Marden J. Clark for "God's Plenty" and Marilyn McMeen Miller Brown for "Grandmother"
- Consultant in Poetry to the Library of Congress (later the post would be called "Poet Laureate Consultant in Poetry to the Library of Congress"): William Meredith appointed this year.
- National Book Award for Poetry: Howard Nemerov, The Collected Poems of Howard Nemerov
- Pulitzer Prize for Poetry: Howard Nemerov, The Collected Poems of Howard Nemerov
- Rhysling Award:
  - Gene Wolfe, The Computer Iterates the Greater Trumps (Long Form}
  - Sonya Dorman, Corruption of Metals (Short Form, tie)
  - Andrew Joron, Asleep in the Arms of Mother Night (Short Form, tie)
  - Duane Ackerson, The Starman (Short Form, tie)
- Walt Whitman Award: Karen Snow, Wonders
- Fellowship of the Academy of American Poets: Josephine Miles

=== France ===
- Guillaume Apollinaire prize: Jean-Claude Renard, La Lumière du silence

=== Other ===
- Cuba: Casa de las Américas prize for poetry: Claribel Alegria of El Salvador, for Sobrevivo
- Soviet Union: USSR State Prize: Andrei Voznesensky

== Births ==
- June 7 – Jesse Ball, American poet and writer
- October 24 – Kei Miller, Jamaican-born poet and writer
- September 4 – Natalie Diaz, Mojave American poet, language activist, professional basketball player and educator
- Also
  - Jen Hadfield, English poet and visual artist
  - J. O. Morgan, Scottish poet

== Deaths ==
Birth years link to the corresponding "[year] in poetry" article:

- January 20 – Gilbert Highet, 71, Scottish-American classicist, academic, writer, intellectual, critic and literary historian, of cancer
- February 2 – G. Sankara Kurup, 76 (born 1901), Indian Malayalam-language poet
- February 22 – Phyllis McGinley, 72 (born 1905), American children's story writer and poet
- March 19 – Faith Baldwin, 84, American romantic novelist and poet
- March 22 – John Hall Wheelock, 91, American poet
- April 14 – F. R. Leavis, 82, English literary critic
- April 16 – Elizabeth Rebecca Ward, 97, English versifier
- April 28 – Walter Fischer, 77, Austrian medical doctor, journalist, radio broadcaster, translator, poet, anti-fascist resistance fighter and Communist Party official
- May 1 – Sylvia Townsend Warner, 84, English novelist and poet
- May 12 – Louis Zukofsky, 74, American modernist poet
- July 2 – Aris Alexandrou, 56, Greek poet
- June 3 – Frank Stanford, 29, American poet, by suicide
- September 9 – Hugh MacDiarmid, 86, Scottish poet
- Also:
  - Sankara Kurup (born 1901), Indian, Malayalam-language poet
  - P. Kunhiraman Nair (born 1909), Indian, Malayalam-language poet
  - J. Rodolfo Wilcock (born 1919), Argentine author and poet

== Notes ==
- Britannica Book of the Year 1979 ("for events of 1978"), published by Encyclopædia Britannica 1979 (source of many items in "Works published" section and rarely in other sections)

== See also ==
- Poetry
- List of poetry awards
- List of years in poetry
