= ELANA =

Elana may refer to:

- ELANA, excimer laser-assisted nonocclusive anastomosis, a type of bypass surgery
- ELaNa: Educational Launch of Nanosatellites, the CubeSat launch program managed by NASA's Launch Services Program
- Elana Toruń, a Polish football club
- Elana, West Virginia

== People ==
- Elana K. Arnold, American children's and young adult author who wrote What Girls Are Made Of
- Elana Bell (born 1977), American poet
- Elana Dykewomon (born 1949), American lesbian activist and author
- Elana Eden (born 1940), Israeli actress
- Elana Greenfield, American playwright
- Elana Herzog (born 1954), American installation artist
- Elana Hill (born 1988), Zimbabwean rower
- Elana James (born 1970) American singer and songwriter
- Elana Johnson (born 1950), American young adult author, known for her Possession series
- Elana Mann (born 1982), American artist
- Elana Meyer (born 1966), South African runner
- Elana Meyers (born 1984), American bobsledder
- Elana Stone (born 1980), Australian singer
- Elana Maryles Sztokman (born 1969), American sociologist
- Elana Wills (born 1962), American State Supreme Court justice

== See also ==
- Alana
- Elena (disambiguation)
