= Northwest Guilford High School =

American public school in North Carolina

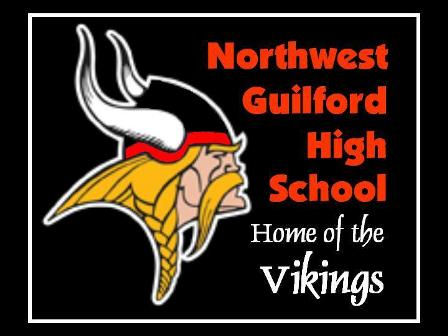

Location
- 5240 Northwest School Road; Greensboro, North Carolina 27409; United States; 36°09′13″N 79°57′17″W

Information
- Type: Public
- Motto: "It's a great day to be a Viking."
- Established: 1962 (64 years ago)
- School district: Guilford County Schools
- CEEB code: 341606
- Principal: Brian Muller
- Teaching staff: 98.49 (on an FTE basis)
- Grades: 9-12
- Enrollment: 2,042 (2023–2024)
- Student to teacher ratio: 20.73
- Colors: Red, Black, White
- Athletics: NCHSAA 8A
- Athletics conference: Central Piedmont 7A/8A
- Team name: Vikings
- Website: northwesths.gcsnc.com

Northwest Guilford High School is a public high school in Guilford County, North Carolina. In 2022–2023 it had an enrollment of approximately 2,000 students in grades 9 through 12.

The school was ranked by Newsweek's Best High Schools in America as 22nd among North Carolina high schools in 2024.

== Academics ==
Northwest has a large selection of Advanced Placement courses, English Language, English Literature, Seminar, Statistics, Calculus AB, Calculus BC, Computer Science Principles, Biology, Chemistry, Physics I, Physics II, Pre-Calculus, Environmental Science, Government & Politics, World History, Psychology, US History, Human Geography, African American Studies, Latin, German, Spanish, Studio Art-Drawing, Studio Art-2D.

Students may take additional online courses through the North Carolina Virtual Public School, and can take dual enrollment courses as part of the Career and College Promise program at Guilford Technical Community College.

== Athletics ==
Northwest Guilford High School is a member of the North Carolina High School Athletic Association (NCHSAA) and is classified as a 8A school. The school is a part of the Central Piedmont 7A/8A Conference.

Fall sports include: cheerleading; field hockey; boys' soccer; boys' and girls' cross country; girls' flag football; girls' tennis; football; boys' and girls' volleyball; girls' volleyball; and girls' golf.

Winter sports include: boys' and girls' basketball; boys' and girls' indoor track; boys' wrestling; and boys' and girls' swimming.

Spring sports include: boys' baseball; girls' soccer; boys' and girls' track and field; boys' volleyball; boys' golf; and boys' and girls' lacrosse.

=== State Championships ===
Northwest Guilford has won the following NCHSAA team state championships:

- Baseball: 1998 (4A)
- Boys Basketball: 1967 (3A)
- Girls Basketball: 2017 (4A), 2018 (4A)
- Boys Golf: 1988 (3A), 1994 (3A), 2005 (4A)
- Girls Golf: 2007 (4A)
- Boys Lacrosse: 2011 (All Classes)
- Slow-Pitch Softball: 1996 (3A/4A)
- Wrestling Dual Team: 2019 (4A), 2023 (4A)

== Arts ==
Northwest Arts Programs include Band, Visual Arts, Vikings Voices, Drama & Orchestra.

== Bands ==
There are three class bands: Concert, Symphonic, and Wind Ensemble, as well as a Jazz Band and Percussion Ensemble.

=== Marching band ===
About 15% of the student population participates in at least one of the band programs offered.

==== Bowl games and other notable marching events ====
- 1984 DeSoto/Tropicana National Band Contest Grand Champion
- 1991 Gator Bowl Competition Champion
- 2004 Outback Bowl Competition
- 2018 Hollywood Christmas Parade

=== Winter guard ===
- 2023 AIA Championships Scholastic AA Class- 1st Place

Concert bands

- 2021 80th Commemoration Concert Series at Pearl Harbor

=== Jazz band ===
- 1996 Atlanta Summer Olympics- Performances in the Parks

== Theatre ==
The school's theatre department is home to the International Thespian Society's Troupe 8010.

== Notable alumni ==
- Patrick Ball — actor, currently stars in the HBO Max medical drama series The Pitt
- Traci Dinwiddie — actress
- Adam Green — cognitive neuroscientist
- Leah Naomi Green — poet who was winner of the Walt Whitman award of the Academy of American Poets in 2019
- Scott Houston — national champion pole vaulter who won at the 2018 USA Indoor Track and Field Championships
- Elizabeth “Liz” Kitley — WNBA player
- Rusty LaRue — former NBA player and 1998 NBA Champion
- Ryan Wesley Routh — attempted assassin of Donald Trump in September 2024
- Mike Skeen — professional stock car racing driver
- Tré Turner — professional American football player

== See also ==
- Guilford County Schools
- North Carolina Department of Public Instruction
- North Carolina State Board of Education
