= Doller =

Doller may mean:

- Doller (river)
- Doller (surname)
- Animegao, a Japanese form of costume dressing
- A misspelling
