= Aïn Oulmene =

Coordinates: 35°55′N 5°18′E

Aïn Oulmene عين اولمان
- Commune and town
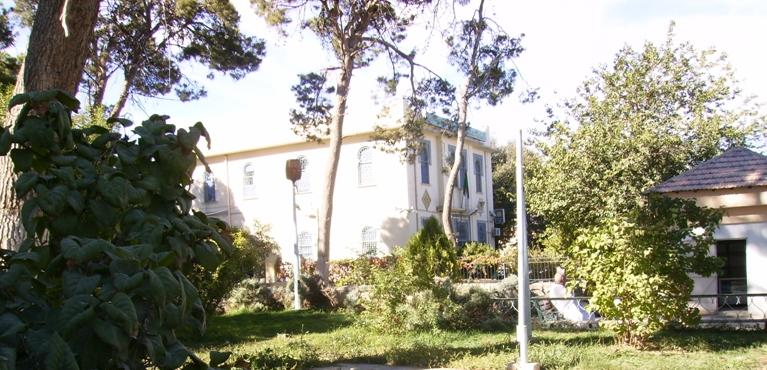
- Ain-Oulmène, Algeria

- Country: Algeria
- Province: Sétif Province
- District: Aïn Oulmane District

Area
  - Total: 200 sq mi (530 km^{2})
- Elevation: 3,120 ft (950 m)

Population (2008)
  - Total: 73,831
  - Density: 360/sq mi (139/km^{2})
- Time zone: UTC+1 (CET)
- Postal code: 19200
- Area code: 1928

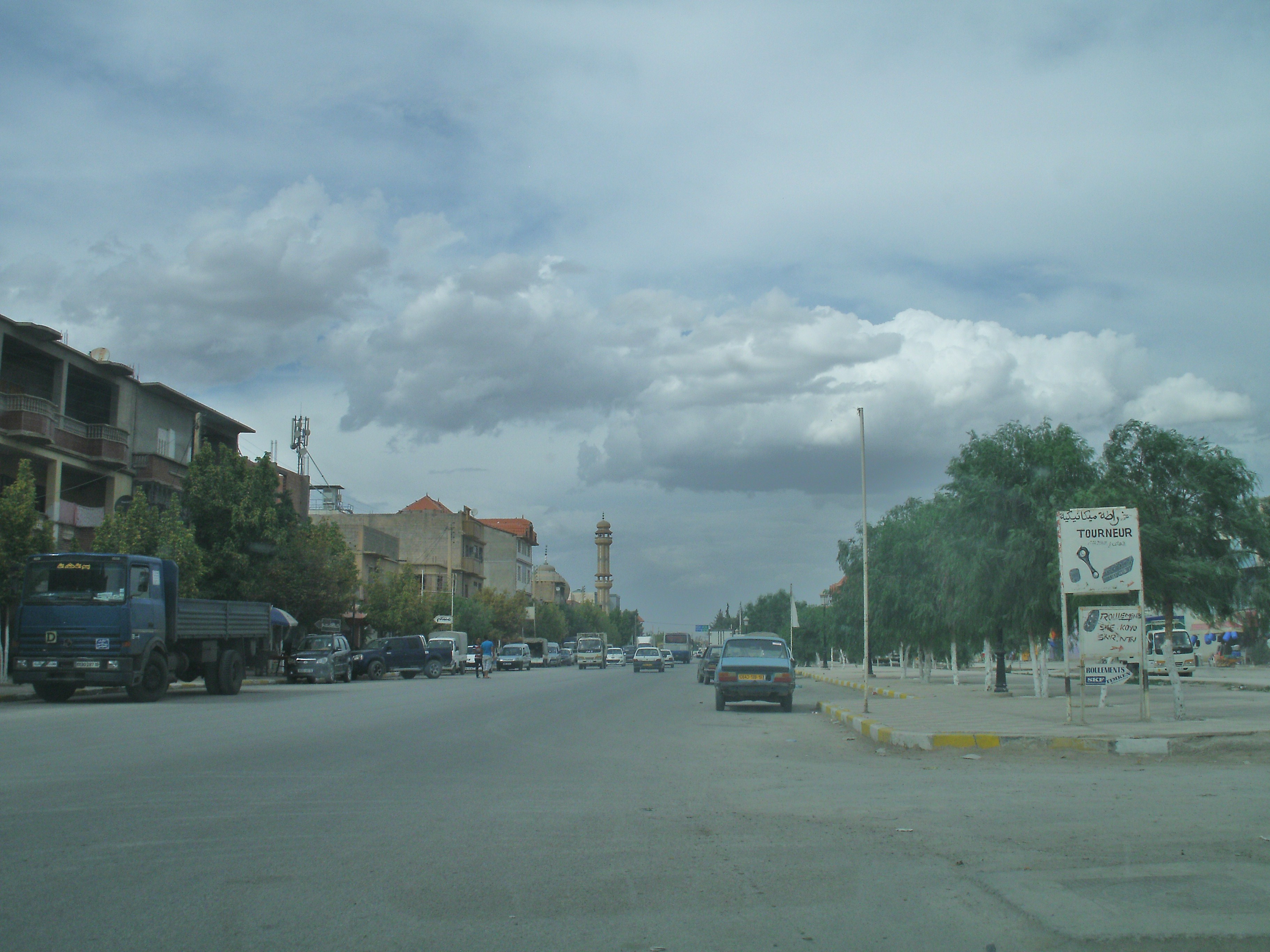
Ain Oulmane.

Aïn Oulmene (Arabic: عين اولمان; Berber: ⵢⵏⵓⵍⵎⴰⵏ), the classical Zaraï, is a town and commune in Sétif Province in north-eastern Algeria.

== Name ==
The town derives its name from the Arabic "ain" ("source") and the Berber "Oulmane" ("weaver's son"). The name could also mean "Fountain Elms" according to Arthur Pellegrin. "Oulmen" is the plural of "Oulmou," meaning "elm" in Berber, from the Latin "Ulmus".

== Geography ==
The town is the capital of the Aïn Oulmene county. Located 30 kilometers southwest of Sétif, the Algerian Route Nationale 28 runs through Aïn Oulmene. At an altitude of 950 meters, Aïn Oulmene is situated between the high fertile plains south of Sétif and the Hodna Mountains to the west. The east of the town is generally flat terrain, while its western part has small mountains. The highest of these peaks is Osmane Jebel, reaching 1,100 meters. The town had 73,831 inhabitants in 2008 census.

== History ==
The indigenous inhabitants of Aïn Oulmene were the Zenata and Sanhadja Berber tribes.

Zaraï was a Carthaginian trading post that minted its own bronze coins.

According to Stéphane Gsell, who undertook excavations in the area in the early 20th century, the plains to the south of the Sétif colony founded by Nerva (96-98) were Roman-occupied. This occupation stretched all the way to Zaraï during the reign of Hadrian (AD 117-138). At the time, the plains constituted a military and fiscal territory protected by a cohort stationed at Zaraï (either the 1st Flavia Equilata or 6th Commagenorum). For centuries, Aïn Oulmene was a Roman and Byzantine era necropolis.

In the 8th century, Uqba ibn Nafi installed a garrison nearby.

Aïn Oulmene was the capital of the township of Rirha (pronounced "ryɣa") from 1880 to 1958. The name "Aïn Oulmene" appeared for the first time in 1887 on an administrative document. Aïn Oulmene was known as "Colbert" by the French from 1887 and was the capital of the Colbert commune from 1935 to 1962. The name "Aïn Oulmene" reappeared in 1962 with the independence of Algeria.

== Economy ==
Aïn Oulmene is located in an agricultural region. Cereal and vegetables were once cultivated here, but after the drought of the last quarter century, tobacco, livestock and poultry are more popular.

== Sports ==
The town has a football club ESAO (previously ESC) founded in 1927 whose colors are blue and white. There is a boxing club and a women's handball club which has represented Algeria in various international competitions.

== Notable people ==
- Jean Baptiste Mattei, 1898–1980, born in Corti, doctor by profession. He moved to Algeria in 1927, was the first mayor (Socialist) of Colbert (Aïn Oulmene) from 1928 to 1937, and was a colonial doctor in New Caledonia in 1938. He joined the Free France movement in 1940 and was appointed Chief Resident of the Wallis and Futuna archipelago from 1942 to 1945. In 1947, he was appointed District Director of Health in Algiers, a position he held until 1965. He died in Bastia in 1980.
- Djamila Debbeche, born in 1921 in the region of Aïn Oulmene (formerly Colbert), a pioneer in French-language women's literature in Algeria. Author of the novel "Leïla, Young Girl From Algeria" (Leïla, jeune fille d'Algérie) published in 1947.
- Noureddine Aba, born February 16, 1921, in Aïn Oulmene (formerly Colbert), poet, storyteller, playwright, creator of the Aba Foundation in 1991 which awards prizes to the best writers of the year.
- Abdelwahab Hammoudi, born in 1955 in Ain Oulmène (formerly Colbert). Filmmaker, novelist, and essayist.
- Azzedine Djellaoudji, Arabic poet and novelist.
- Sofiane Mokhenache, Arabic novelist, author of the novel "لا يترك في متناول الأطفال".
- Bassem Debbabi, Doctor in Computer Engineering at the University of Grenoble. Three-time champion of Algeria in Computer Science (2000, 2001, and 2002).
