= Afterland (poetry collection) =

2017 debut poetry collection by Mai Der Vang

Afterland: Poems
- Author: Mai Der Vang
- Publisher: Graywolf Press
- Publication date: April 4, 2017
- Pages: 96
- Awards: Walt Whitman Award
- ISBN: 978-1555977702
- Followed by: Yellow Rain

Afterland: Poems is a 2017 debut poetry collection by Hmong American poet Mai Der Vang. It was published by Graywolf Press after Vang won the Walt Whitman Award in 2016, which included publication as a prize. Vang's manuscript had been chosen by Carolyn Forché. The book later went on to be a finalist for the National Book Award for Poetry.

== Background and content ==
The book traces a history of Hmong people during the Secret War and during their subsequent retreat to an "afterland" as refugees. It also concerns the spiritual, ancestral lives of Hmong people who died in the aforementioned events.

A daughter of Hmong refugees herself, Vang's poems were written with regard to her own Hmong heritage and history, as well as her grasp of the Hmong language. Growing up, Vang learned about the Secret War through documents which she found in a briefcase belonging to her parents, who had come to the United States in the eighties. Later, when she wrote the book during her attendance of the Columbia University MFA program, Vang additionally called upon historical research and community testimony in addition to her own family's experiences.

In the Chicago Review of Books, Vang clarified the manifold meanings of "afterland" in her work:

"The afterland, in its obvious sense refers to the place after death, but it also embodies the after-place or after-country of the refugee. Wherever that refugee ends up is the afterland, whether it's a refugee camp on the other side of the river or California on the other side of the world. But the country that refugee has just fled is a kind of post-war afterland too, devastated by unexploded ordnances and political turmoil. I think of Laos in this case after the fallout of the Vietnam War."

== Critical reception ==
In addition to its other prizes and nominations, the book was a finalist for the Kate Tufts Discovery Award. Dan Chiasson named it in his list of poetry he was grateful for in 2017. It ranked 24th in The Brooklyn Rail's best books of 2017 list.

The New Yorker stated "Vang writes strikingly, often chillingly visual poems, their images projected one at a time, like slides in a lecture, or perhaps in a trial" and observed her usage of the Hmong language throughout her poems.

Los Angeles Review noted "in these moving and deft poems by Mai Der Vang, the intertwined landscapes of time, place, and self are dreamlike and discursive, evolving and devolving, imbued with memory." Cream City Review said the book "is upsetting and loud and intimate in all the best goddamn ways, and it is utterly fascinating to watch Mai Der Vang turn through the cycle of prophet, advocate, shaman, and artist, never truly divorced from any of those roles." Frontier Poetry wrote that "Mai Der Vang's voice is uniquely mature for a debut collection, with undeniable authority over her language."

With regard to Vang's observance of the Secret War in Laos, Gulf Coast said "The poems are full of smoke and ghosts, the kinds of lingering that make history manifest." Similarly, Rain Taxi stated "This stunning collection is not only the debut of a poet with a startlingly original voice; it also reminds the reader how long the legacy of a war lasts." Ploughshares wrote that "Through the metaphorical work of the poems, [Vang] at once seeks to imaginatively understand the war, and she must also spark the same understanding in the reader." Los Angeles Review of Books, in reviewing the book alongside Layli Long Soldier's Whereas, noted that it "draws just as effectively upon a complex history of threatened identity and language." DVAN concluded:

"Through striking diction and intelligent verse, Afterland has earned its place as a distinct, prominent addition to the contemporary Southeast Asian American poetic canon, cultivating complexity in the definition of refugee and demonstrating the incongruities among not only Southeast Asian American literary voices, but Southeast Asian American experiences."
