= Ben Doyle =

Ben Doyle may refer to:

- Ben Doller (né Doyle; born 1973), American poet and writer
- Benjamin Doyle (born 1991 or 1992), New Zealand politician
- Ben Doyle, American YouTuber, co-creator of Jet Lag: The Game
