= Zarai (surname) =

Zaraï or Zarai is a surname. Notable people with the surname include:

- Rika Zaraï (1938–2020), Franco-Israeli singer and writer
- Yochanan Zarai (1929)–2016, Israeli composer

== See also ==
- Zaraï
