= Thirkield =

Thirkield is a surname. Notable people with the name include:

- Jonathan Thirkield, American poet
- Wilbur P. Thirkield (1854–1934), American Methodist bishop and president of Howard University
