= Jan Richman =

American poet

- Education: New York University
- Occupation: Poet
- Writing career
- Notable awards: Walt Whitman Award (1994)

Jan Richman is an American poet.

== Life ==
She graduated from the NYU Graduate Creative Writing Program.

In 2001, Jan Richman and Beth Lisick presented a benefit "Poetry & Pizza," by 9x9 Industries. She worked at SF Gate, the online version of the San Francisco Chronicle. She read at Edinburgh Castle, and Writers With Drinks. Her poems have appeared in The Nation, Ploughshares, Comet, Other Magazine, The Bloomsbury Review, Luna,

In 2001, she co-edited the literary journal 6,500.

Richman taught at the City College of San Francisco, and lives in Oakland, California.

== Controversy ==
From 2001 until 2004, she taught at the Academy of Art University, where there was a controversy about a student composition. Alan Kaufman took up the cause of the student's expulsion and Richman's firing by organizing protests against the academy's response. Kaufman was later dismissed from his job at the academy because of his role in leading protests about the controversy. In support of Kaufman's protest against the student's expulsion, authors Stephen King and Salman Rushdie (at the time, Rushdie was President of the PEN American Center) wrote letters of protest concerning the academy's handling of the matter.

The incident inspired a play Harmless, by Brett Neveu.

== Awards ==
- 1994 Walt Whitman Award chosen by Robert Pinsky
- 1993 "Discovery"/The Nation Award
- National Endowment for the Arts Fellowship
- Felix Pollack Poetry Prize
- Celia B. Wagner Award.

== Works ==
- "Nothing Can be Done; One or More; An Arm & a Leg; Bleed". Organica News. Summer 2002. Archived from the original on May 6, 2008.

=== Books ===
- Because the Brain Can Be Talked Into Anything (Louisiana State University Press, 1995),
- "Thrill-Bent" (Tupelo Press, 2012)

=== Non-fiction ===
- "Hell on Wheels". SF Gate. May 28, 2001.

=== Anthologies ===
- Thrills, Chills, Pills & Heartache. Alyson Press. 2004.
- Kim Addonizio, Dorianne Laux (1997). "You've Changed Dr. Jekyll". The Poet's companion. W. W. Norton & Company. pp. 131–132. ISBN 978-0-393-31654-4. "Jan Richman."

=== Ploughshares ===
- "Origami for Adults". Ploughshares. Winter 1993–1994. Archived from the original on September 26, 2006.
- "Ajijic". Ploughshares. Winter 1993–1994. Archived from the original on August 20, 2006.
- "Driving Out of Providence". Ploughshares. Spring 1997. Archived from the original on August 19, 2006.
