= Eric Pankey =

American poet

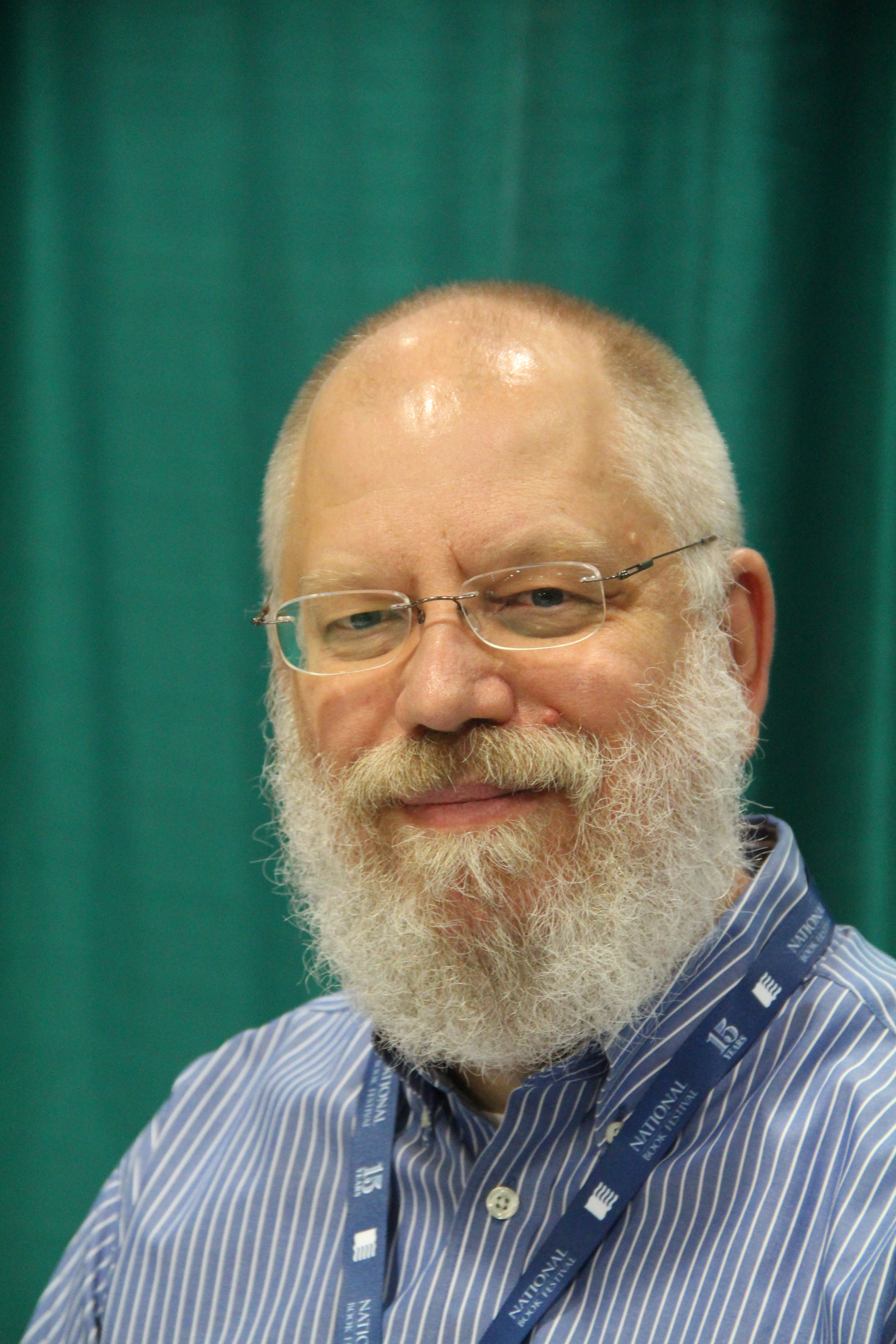
- Eric Pankey at 2015 National Book Festival
- Born: 1959 (age 66–67); Kansas City, Missouri, U.S.
- Education: University of Missouri; University of Iowa
- Occupations: Poet, artist
- Employer(s): Washington University in St. Louis; George Mason University

Eric Pankey (born 1959 in Kansas City, Missouri) is an American poet and artist. He is married to the poet Jennifer Atkinson (born 1955).

Pankey's poetry has moved from the literal and narrative as in _Heartwood,_ towards the suggestiveness of Emerson, without the hopefulness implicit in Emerson's transcendentalism. In Pankey's poems, often written in free verse forms or in prose poetry, the hint of grand comprehensiveness is suggested, without the hope of absorption into a universalizing or redemptive whole. The result, as in his "Souvenir de Voyage" (2015 in Verse)—an implied answer to Baudelaire's "Invitation au Voyage," is a glimpse of redemption from which the speaker of the poems, and thus the reader, is blocked, a promise unfulfilled and perhaps unfulfillable. Behind this urge lies a religious impulse that may remind a reader of T. S. Eliot. Yet the persistence of the seeking separates Pankey from Samuel Beckett; he remains on the closer side of despair.

== Life ==
He graduated with a BA from the University of Missouri in 1981 and in 1983, his MFA from University of Iowa. In 1987, after teaching English at the high school level and writing poetry, he became the director of the Creative Writing Program at Washington University in St. Louis. He currently teaches at George Mason University. He lives with his wife and daughter in Fairfax, Virginia.

His work has appeared in The Antioch Review, Antaeus, Denver Quarterly, Seneca Review, Quarry West, Superpresent, and AGNI. His papers are held at Washington University Libraries.

== Awards ==
- 1984 Walt Whitman Award* 1984 Younger Poets Award from Academy of American Poets selected by Mark Strand
- Ingram Merrill Foundation Award
- 2000 Guggenheim Fellowship
- National Endowment for the Arts

== Works ==
=== Poetry ===
- "Film Still". Courtland Review. Spring 2008.
- "DREAM LANDSCAPE WITH THE OLD BRICKYARD ROAD CREEK AND BLIND WILLIE JOHNSON; THE PHRASE OF THINE ACTIONS; SAVANT OF BIRDCALLS; INTERLUDE; SEE THAT MY GRAVE IS SWEPT CLEAN". The Beltway Poetry Quarterly. 3 (3). Summer 2002.
- "Final Thought". Virginia Quarterly Review: 667–668. Autumn 2002. Archived from the original on 2008-09-06.
- "An Eagle-Headed Genie Watering the Tree of Life". Virginia Quarterly Review: 667. Autumn 2002. Archived from the original on 2008-10-16.
- "READING IN BED; A WALK WITH MY FATHER; DEBTOR OF HAPPINESS; OVERCOAT; IN MEMORY; ABSTRACTION; SCAFFOLDING; THE PILGRIMAGE OF MY FATHER'S GHOST; APPROACHING ACCADEMIA: A NOCTURNE; IN SIENA, PROSPERO RECONSIDERS THE MARRIAGE AT CANA; THE AUGURY OF PROSPERO; SEE THAT MY GRAVE IS SWEPT CLEAN; HOW TO SUSTAIN THE VISIONARY MODE; THE ANNIVERSARY; EPITAPH; PIAZZA S. SPIRITO NO. 9; THE BACK-STORY; THE THOUSAND THISTLE SEEDS; BETWEEN WARS". The Innisfree Poetry Journal. Mar 13, 2008.

=== Books ===
- Tending the Garden. Yellow Jar Press. 1982. chapbook
- For the New Year. Atheneum. 1984. ISBN 978-0-689-11507-3.
- Heartwood. Orchises Press. 1988. ISBN 978-0-914061-78-6.
- Apocrypha. Knopf. 1991. ISBN 978-0-679-40617-4.
- The Late Romances. Alfred A. Knopf. 1997. ISBN 978-0-679-45454-0.
- Cenotaph. Knopf. 2000. ISBN 978-0-375-40764-2.
- Oracle figures. Ausable Press. 2003. ISBN 978-1-931337-08-3.
- Reliquaries. Ausable Press. 2005. ISBN 978-1-931337-12-0.
- The Pear as One Example: New & Selected Poems 1984–2008. Ausable Press. 2008. ISBN 978-1-931337-39-7.
- Trace. Milkweed Editions. 2013. ISBN 978-1-57131-873-2.
- Dismantling the Angel. Parlor Press. 2014. ISBN 978-1-60235-487-6.
- Crow-Work. Milkweed Editions. 2015. ISBN 978-1-57131-884-8.

=== Anthologies ===
- Hilda Raz, ed. (2001). Best of Prairie schooner. University of Nebraska Press. ISBN 978-0-8032-8972-7. "Eric Pankey."
