= Doller (surname) =

Doller is a surname. Notable people with the surname include:

- Ben Doller (born 1973), American poet and writer
- Mikhail Doller (1889–1952), Lithuanian film director

== See also ==
- Dollery
