= Adam Green (neuroscientist) =

American cognitive neuroscientist

Adam E. Green
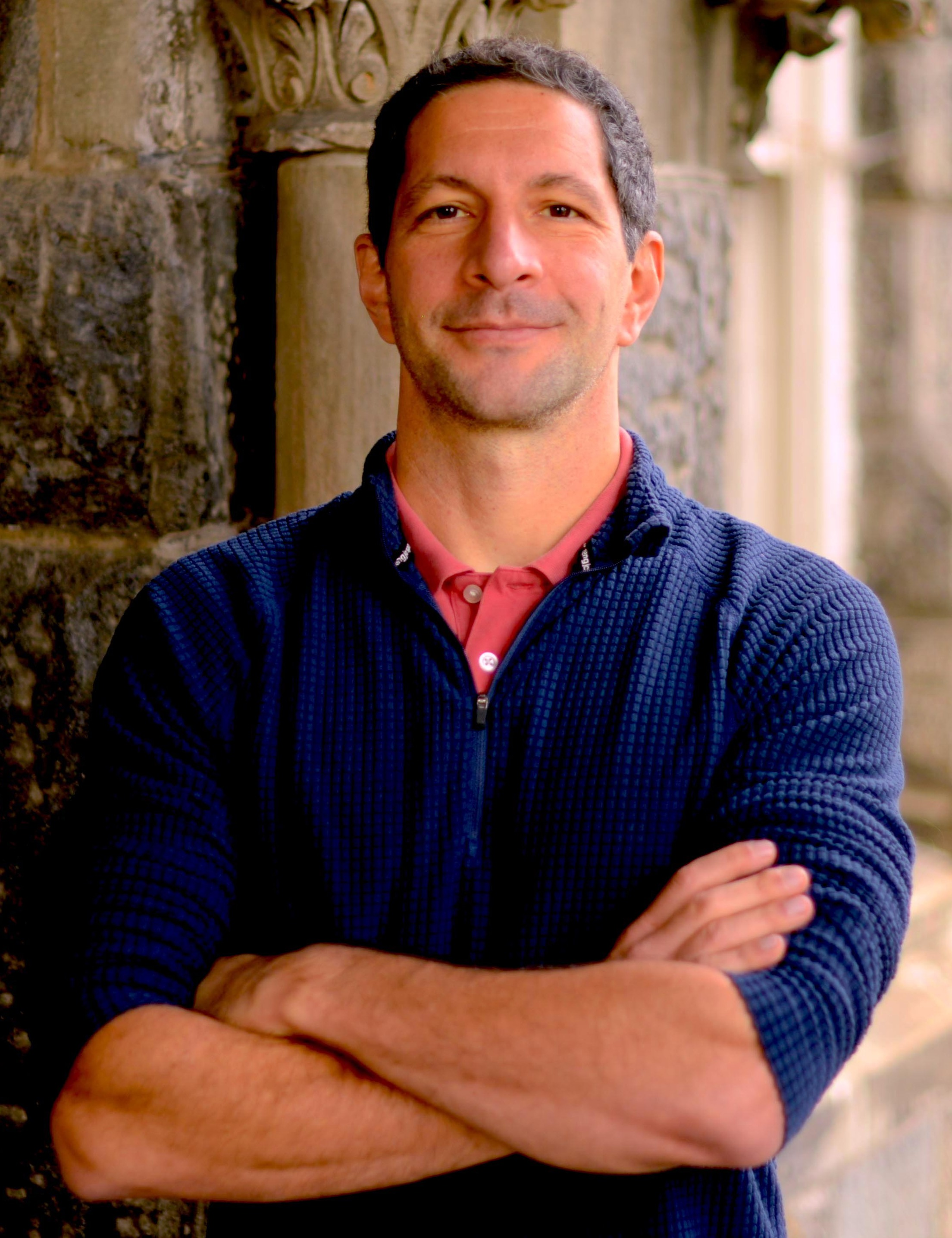
- Born: Greensboro, North Carolina, U.S.
- Education: Johns Hopkins University (B.A.) Dartmouth College (Ph.D.)
- Known for: Research on creativity, reasoning, and brain function
- Title: Professor of Psychology
- Scientific career
- Fields: Cognitive neuroscience
- Workplaces: Georgetown University
- Doctoral advisor: Kevin N. Dunbar

Adam E. Green is an American cognitive neuroscientist and academic known for his research on creativity, analogical reasoning, and the neural mechanisms underlying learning and problem-solving. He is Professor of Psychology at Georgetown University and Editor-in-Chief of the Creativity Research Journal.

== Early life and education ==
Green was born in Greensboro, North Carolina, and attended Northwest Guilford High School. He earned a Bachelor of Arts degree from Johns Hopkins University in 2001 and a Ph.D. in cognitive neuroscience from Dartmouth College in 2007. From 2007 to 2010, he conducted postdoctoral research at Yale University

== Career ==
Green joined the faculty of Georgetown University in 2010 as assistant professor of Psychology and was promoted to associate professor in 2017, serving as the university's Provost's Distinguished Associate Professor from 2020 to 2023. He became Professor of Psychology in 2023. Green is also affiliated with the Interdisciplinary Program in Neuroscience at the Georgetown University Medical Center.

Green is a founder of the Society for the Neuroscience of Creativity, where he served as president from 2019 to 2021 and has been a member of the executive committee since 2015. In 2022, he became Editor-in-Chief of the Creativity Research Journal, having previously been Senior Associate Editor.

== Research ==
Green's research examines the cognitive and neural mechanisms of creativity and reasoning. His work integrates behavioral and neuroimaging methods to study how the brain supports creative thought and analogical reasoning.

At Georgetown, Green teaches courses on neurophilosophy and cognitive neuroscience, exploring how philosophical questions about human thought can be addressed through brain-based research.

One focus of Green's work is the study of "semantic distance," a measure of conceptual similarity used to quantify creativity in reasoning. His studies have explored how creative thinking can vary as a dynamic state, rather than a fixed trait, and how neural activity in the frontopolar cortex supports conscious augmentation of creative thought.

Green has also studied "creativity anxiety," a form of anxiety that arises when people are asked to generate creative ideas.

Green has studied the effects of generative artificial intelligence on creativity and language use. A 2025 study of 2,200 college-admissions essays found greater idea diversity in human-written essays than in those generated by GPT-4. A 2026 preprint examining 372,793 college-application essays reported that post-ChatGPT and AI-assisted essays used more varied language but expressed less diverse ideas, a pattern the authors called "semantic disjunction". The essays were nevertheless rated as more creative, which the authors associated with their greater word-level diversity.
