= Mary Rose O'Reilley =

American poet, novelist and non-fiction writer

- Born: Pampa, Texas
- Education: College of St. Catherine, University of Wisconsin–Milwaukee
- Writing career
- Genre: Poetry

Mary Rose O'Reilley is an American poet, novelist, and writer of non-fiction.

== Life ==
O'Reilley was born in Pampa, Texas, and educated in Roseville and Saint Paul, Minnesota. She was raised a Catholic and is now a member of the Religious Society of Friends (Quakers). She has spent time in Buddhist practice, in particular under Thich Nhat Hanh. She graduated from the College of St. Catherine and completed her Ph.D. at the University of Wisconsin–Milwaukee.

From 1978 to 2006, she taught English and environmental studies at the College/University of St. Thomas.

O'Reilley lives on an island in Puget Sound.

== Awards ==
- 2005 Walt Whitman Award
- Contemplative Studies Grant from the American Council of Learned Societies
- Bush Artist Grant
- McKnight Award of Distinction
- 2018 Brighthorse Prize for the novel (Bright Morning Stars)

== Works ==
- "The Plain Speech". Orion Magazine. March–April 2009.
- "The Abandoned Farm". Poetry. March 2007.
- Alice Peck, ed. (2008). "Key Lime Pie". Bread, Body, Spirit. SkyLight Paths Publishing. ISBN 978-1-59473-242-3.

=== Fiction ===
- Bright Morning Stars. Bright Horse Books. 2018. ISBN 978-1-944467-14-2.

=== Poetry ===
- Earth, Mercy. Louisiana State University Press. 2013.
- Half Wild. Louisiana State University Press. 2006. ISBN 978-0-8071-3162-6. "Mary Rose O Reilley."

=== Non-fiction ===
- O'Reilley, Mary Rose (2000). The Barn at the End of the World. ISBN 978-1-57131-254-9.
- The Garden at Night. Heinemann
- Radical Presence. Heinemann
- The love of impermanent things: a threshold ecology. Milkweed Editions. 2006. ISBN 978-1-57131-283-9.
- The Peaceable Classroom. Boynton/Cook. November 17, 1993. ISBN 978-0-86709-328-5.

=== Ploughshares ===
- "Sellers Motivated". Ploughshares. Winter 2007–2008. Archived from the original on January 28, 2016.
- "Improving the Neighborhood". Ploughshares. Winter 2007–2008. Archived from the original on January 28, 2016.
- "Cleaning the Basement". Ploughshares. Winter 2007–2008. Archived from the original on January 28, 2016.
