= Emily Skaja =

American poet

- Born: Illinois
- Education: Millikin University, Temple University, Purdue University
- Occupation: Poet
- Writing career
- Notable work: Brute
- Notable awards: Walt Whitman award of the Academy of American Poets (2018)
- Website: Skaja's website

Emily Skaja is an American poet. She is the author of Brute, winner of the Walt Whitman award of the Academy of American Poets in 2018.

== Early life and education ==
Emily Skaja was raised in Huntley, Illinois. She has a BA in creative writing from Millikin University, an MA in creative writing from Temple University, an MFA in creative writing from Purdue University, and a PhD in creative writing and literature, with a certificate in women's, gender, and sexuality studies, from the University of Cincinnati, where she was also a Taft Summer Research fellow.

== Career ==
Skaja's first poetry collection, Brute, was published by Graywolf Press in 2019. The collection, with themes of gender, abuse and identity, won the 2018 Walt Whitman Award for poets who have not published a book.

Skaja was the 2014 winner of The Russell Prize for emerging poets from Two Sylvias Press. In 2015, she was awarded the Gulf Coast Prize in poetry. She is also the recipient of a 2015 Thomas H. Scholl and Elizabeth Boyd Thompson Poetry Prize (Purdue University), and the recipient of a 2015 AWP Intro Journals Award.

Skaja is the associate poetry editor of Southern Indiana Review. She holds a Creative Writing Fellowship from the National Endowment for the Arts for 2019–2020. She lives in Memphis, Tennessee.

== Selected publications ==
- Brute, (Graywolf Press, 2019)

== Awards ==
- Walt Whitman award, Brute, (2018)
- Gulf Coast Prize in Poetry, 2015
- Russell Prize for Emerging Poets, from Two Sylvias Press, 2014
