= Judy Jordan =

American poet (born 1961)

Judy Jordan (born 1961) is an American poet. Her honors include the Walt Whitman Award and the National Book Critics Circle Award.

== Life ==
She grew up on a small farm near the Carolina border. Her parents were sharecroppers, and she was picking cotton by the time she was 5. She was the first member of her family to attend university, with a Bachelor of Arts from the University of Virginia in 1990, and a Master of Fine Arts degree in 1995. She earned a Master of Fine Arts degree, in fiction from the University of Utah, in 2000. She lived in Salt Lake City.

She taught at the University of Virginia, Piedmont Virginia Community College, and California State University, San Marcos. She teaches at Southern Illinois University Carbondale.

She lives off-the-grid in a cabin that she built herself in the Shawnee National Forest, and is working on a non-fiction book about her experiences there. She has a fourth book of poetry, Children of Salt, forthcoming, and has recently completed a novel entitled Broken Days, Broken Hearts and a memoir about her childhood, entitled My Mama, My Sweet Nelly. She is currently working on a biography of a woman who helped save over 15,000 children from Second World War Croatian death camps.

Her poems have appeared in Raintaxi, Blue Pitcher Review, Crossroads: A Journal of Southern Culture, Lucid Oona, Poetry, Western Humanities Review, and Writer’s Eye.

== Awards ==
- 1999 Walt Whitman Award
- 2000 National Book Critics Circle Award
- 1996 Virginia Commission for the Arts Fellowship in Poetry,

== Works ==
- "A Taste for Falling"; "In the 25th Year of My Mother's Death", National Public Radio

=== Poetry books ===
- Jordan, Judy (2000). Carolina Ghost Woods: Poems. Louisiana State University Press. ISBN 978-0-8071-2556-4.
- Jordan, Judy (2008). Sixty-Cent Coffee and a Quarter to Dance A Poem. Louisiana State University Press. ISBN 978-0-8071-2996-8.
- Jordan, Judy (2018). Hunger. Tinderbox Editions. ISBN 978-1943981069.

=== Anthologies ===
- Gerald Costanzo, Jim Daniels, ed. (2000). American poetry: the next generation. Carnegie Mellon University Press. ISBN 978-0-88748-343-1.
- Patrice Vecchione, ed. (2007). Faith and Doubt: An Anthology of Poems. Patrice Vecchione. Macmillan. ISBN 978-0-8050-8213-5.
