= Mai Der Vang =

American poet

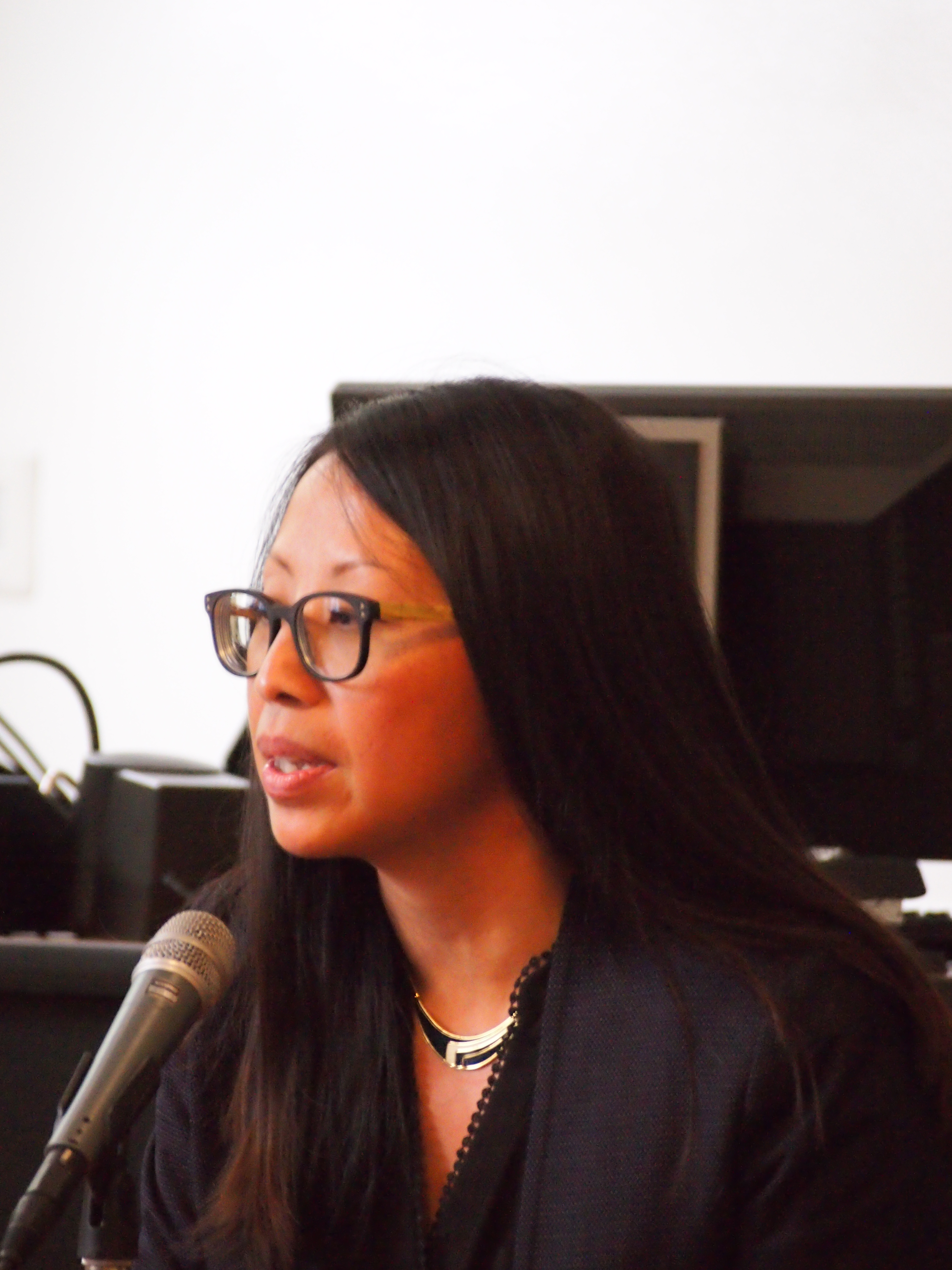
Mai Der Vang (2017)

Mai Der Vang is a Hmong American poet.

== Life and education ==
Vang was born in Fresno, California. Vang's parents resettled in the United States in 1981 as Hmong refugees fleeing Laos.

She graduated from University of California, Berkeley with a degree in English, and from Columbia University with an MFA in Creative Writing-Poetry. She is a Kundiman Fellow.

Her book, Afterland, won the 2016 Walt Whitman Award selected by Carolyn Forche. Afterland was longlisted for the National Book Award for Poetry in 2017, as well as a finalist for the 2018 Kate Tufts Discovery Award.

Vang's book Yellow Rain was finalist for the 2022 Pulitzer Prize in Poetry.

Her third collection, Primordial, was released in 2025 from Graywolf Press.

== Awards and honors ==
=== Literature awards ===
Year	Book	Award	Category	Result	Ref
2016	Afterland	Walt Whitman Award	—	Won	
2017	Afterland	National Book Award for Poetry	—	Longlisted	
2018	Afterland	Kate Tufts Discovery Award	—	Shortlisted	
2022	Yellow Rain	Pulitzer Prize in Poetry	—	Shortlisted	

=== Honors ===
- Lannan Literary Fellowship, 2017.

== Works ==
- —— (2017). Afterland: Poems (paperback 1st ed.). Minneapolis: Graywolf Press. ISBN 9781555977702.
- —— (2021). Yellow Rain: Poems (paperback 1st ed.). Minneapolis: Graywolf Press. ISBN 9781644450659.
- —— (2025). Primordial (paperback 1st ed.). Minneapolis: Graywolf Press. ISBN 978-1-64445-326-1.
