= Dollery =

Dollery is a surname. Notable people with the surname include:

- Colin Dollery (1931–2020), British clinical pharmacologist
- Keith Dollery (1924–2013), Australian cricketer
- Tom Dollery (1914–1987), English cricketer

== See also ==
- Doller (surname)
