= Elaine Terranova =

American poet (born 1939)

- Born: 1939 (age 86–87); Philadelphia, Pennsylvania, U.S.
- Occupation: Poet

Academic background
- Education: Temple University; Goddard College

Academic work
- Institutions: Sweet Briar College; Temple University

Elaine Terranova (born 1939 in Philadelphia) is an American poet.

== Life ==
She grew up in Philadelphia, the daughter of Nathan and Sadie Goldstein. She remained in her home town gaining her education at Temple University where she graduated in 1961 with a bachelor's degree in English. She also married her first husband Philip Terranova that same year. Twelve years later in 1973, she worked as a manuscript editor for J. B. Lippincott & Co. While working there, she attended Vermont's Goddard College culminating in earning her master's degree in 1977. Her career shifted from editing to education and she began teaching English and creative writing at Temple University until 1987.

She developed a passion for writing poetry and began publishing her works while continuing to teach. Her poems have appeared in various publications including The New Yorker, The American Poetry Review, Prairie Schooner, Virginia Quarterly Review, and Ploughshares.

In 2001, “The Choice,” a selection from Damages (Copper Canyon Press, 1996), appeared throughout Philadelphia as a part of the Poetry Society’s Poetry in Motion (arts program). “The River Bathers,” from Damages, was featured on illustrated posters by the Public Poetry Project.

On November 8, 2012, University of Pennsylvania's Kelly Writers House inaugurated the Eva and Leo Sussman Poetry Program with poetry readings by featured guest writers and instructors, Elaine Terranova, Nathalie Anderson, and Joan Hutton Landis. Here, Elaine reads from her 2012 book, Dames Rocket.

She lives in Philadelphia.

== Awards ==
- 1990 Walt Whitman Award of the Academy of American Poets, chosen by Rita Dove
- 1992 Robert Frost Fellowship in Poetry, Bread Loaf Writers' Conference
- 1993 “The Stand-up Shtel” took first prize in the Anna Davidson Rosenberg Competition for poems on the Jewish experience.
- 2006 Pew Fellowships in the Arts
- 2012 Pushcart Prize

== Works ==
- Toward Morning/Swimmers. Chester, PA: Hollow Spring. 1980. ISBN 978-0-936198-02-6. chapbook
- The Cult of the Right Hand. New York: Doubleday. 1991. ISBN 978-0-385-41812-6.
- Damages. Port Townsend, WA: Copper Canyon Press. 1996. ISBN 978-1-55659-105-1.
- The Dog's Heart. Alexandria, VA: Orchises. 2002. ISBN 978-0-914061-90-8.
- Not to: new & selected poems. Sheep Meadow Press. 2006. ISBN 978-1-931357-32-6.
- Elegiac: Footnotes to Rilke's Duino Elegies. Červená Barva Press. 2010. OCLC 752018800. chapbook
- Dames Rocket. Rochester, VT: Penstroke Press. 2012. ISBN 978-0-9669177-9-6.
- Dollhouse. Somerville, MA: Off the Grid Press. 2013. ISBN 978-0-9778429-6-4.

=== Translations ===
- Euripides (1998). "Iphigenia in Aulis". In David R. Slavitt; Smith Palmer Bovie (eds.). Euripides: Alcestis. Daughters of Troy. The Phoenician women. Iphigenia at Aulis. Rhesus. Fred Chappell, Mark Rudman, Elaine Terranova, Richard Elman, George Economou. Philadelphia: University of Pennsylvania Press. p. 221. ISBN 978-0-8122-1650-9.
