= Reg Saner =

American poet (1928–2021)

Reginald A. Saner (December 30, 1928 – April 19, 2021) was an American poet and academic.

== Life and career ==
Reginald A. Saner was born in Jacksonville, Illinois on December 30, 1928. He graduated from St. Norbert College, near Green Bay, Wisconsin. Saner served as an infantry platoon leader in the Korean War. He studied at University of Illinois, and received a Fulbright Scholarship to study at University of Florence.

In the early 1960s he married Anne.

From September 1962 to December 1998, he taught at the University of Colorado Boulder.

Saner lived in Boulder, Colorado. He died there at his home on April 29, 2021, at the age of 92.

== Awards ==
- 1975 Walt Whitman Award
- 1981 National Poetry Series open competition
- 1983 Governor's Award for Excellence in the Arts
- 1998 Wallace Stegner Award
- 1999 Boulder, Colorado first poet laureate

== Works ==
=== Poetry ===
- Climbing into the roots: poems. Harper & Row. 1976. ISBN 978-0-06-013762-5.
- So This Is the Map. Random House. 1981. ISBN 978-0-394-51668-4.
- Essay On Air. Ohio Review. 1984. ISBN 978-0-942148-03-9.
- Red Letters (1981)

=== Non-fiction ===
- "Soldier Poets, a Gadfly, and the Long-Haired Persian" (PDF). WLA Journal. Fall–Winter 2000. Archived from the original (PDF) on November 12, 2006.
- The Four-Cornered Falcon: Essays on the Interior West and the Natural Scene. Johns Hopkins. 1993. ISBN 978-0-8018-4449-2. (Kodansha paperback, 1994)
- Reaching Keet Seel: Ruin's Echo & the Anasazi (University Press of Utah, 1998)
- The Dawn Collector: On My Way to the Natural World Center for American Places 2005

=== Anthologies ===
- Lorrie Goldensohn, ed. (2006). American war poetry: an anthology. Columbia University Press. ISBN 978-0-231-13310-4.
- Short Takes (Norton, 2005)
- Old Glory: American War Poems from the Revolutionary War to the War on Terrorism (Persea, 2004)
- Poetry Comes Up Where It Can (University of Utah Press, 2000)
- Orpheus & Company (University Press of New England, 1999)
- Generations. Penguin. 1998. ISBN 978-0-14-058784-5.
