= Anthony Petrosky =

American poet, and professor

Anthony Petrosky (born Exeter, Pennsylvania) is an American poet, and professor.

== Life ==
He received a doctorate from the University at Buffalo, The State University of New York.

He is associate dean of University of Pittsburgh School of Education.

From 1971-1984, Petrosky was a co-editor of the Slow Loris Press.

He lives in Pittsburgh, Pennsylvania.

He is the Associate Dean of the School of Education at the University of Pittsburgh and co-directs the Institute for Learning with Lauren Resnick at the Learning Research & Development Center. He holds a joint appointment as a Professor in the School of Education and the English Department. He Chairs the English language arts Disciplinary Literacy project in the Institute. As a part of this project, he has worked with professional learning and curriculum development in English and literacy for school and district leaders in the public schools of Austin, Boston, Dallas, Denver, New York City, Fort Worth, Prince George's County, and Pittsburgh. He was the Principal Investigator of the design team to develop assessment prototypes in English language arts and literacy for the Partnership for Assessment of Readiness for College and Career (PARCC).

Petrosky served on the Reading and English Common Core Standards Project to develop common core reading and English standards for the US. In conjunction with this project, he also was a member of the Aspects of Text Complexity Project to develop procedures for assessing text complexity for the common core reading and English standards. He was the Principal Investigator and Co-Director of the Early Adolescence English Language Arts Assessment Development Lab for the National Board for Professional Teaching Standards which developed the first national board certification for English teachers. He has also served as Co-Director of the Western Pennsylvania Writing Project. He was a senior researcher for the MacArthur Foundation’s Higher Literacies Studies, where he was responsible for conducting and writing case studies on literacy efforts in the Denver, Pittsburgh, Toronto, and Ruleville and Mound Bayou school districts in the Mississippi Delta. He is past Chair of the National Council of Teachers of English (NCTE) Committee on Research and a past elected member of the NCTE Research Foundation.

His first collection of poetry, Jurgis Petraskas, published by Louisiana State University Press (LSU), received the Walt Whitman Award from Philip Levine for the Academy of American Poets and a Notable Book Award from the American Library Association. Petrosky’s second collection of poetry, Red and Yellow Boat, was published by LSU in 1994, and Crazy Love, his third collection, was published by LSU in the fall of 2003. Along with David Bartholomae, Petrosky is the co-author and co-editor of four books: Facts, Artifacts, and Counterfacts: Theory and Method for a Reading and Writing Course, The Teaching of Writing, Ways of Reading: An Anthology for Writers, and History and Ethnography: Reading and Writing About Others. Along with Stephanie McConachie, he is the co-editor and co-author of Content Matters: Improving Student Learning Through Disciplinary Literacy published by Josey Bass in 2010.

== Awards ==
- 1982 Walt Whitman Award selected by Philip Levine
- American Library Association Notable Book

== Works ==
=== Poetry ===
- New Lives:[poems]. Rook Press. 1977. ISBN 978-0-916684-16-7.
- The Look of Things: Poems. Inland Boat/Porch Publications. 1980.
- Jurgis Petraskas: Poems. Louisiana State University Press. 1983. ISBN 978-0-608-00869-1.
- Red and Yellow Boat. Louisiana State University Press. 1994. ISBN 978-0-8071-1830-6.
- Crazy Love. Louisiana State University Press. 2003. ISBN 978-0-8071-2896-1.

=== Editor ===
- David Bartholomae; Anthony Petrosky; Tony Petrosky, eds. (2002). Ways of Reading: An Anthology for Writers. Bedford/st Martins. ISBN 978-0-312-39382-3.
- Anthony R. Petrosky; Tony Petrosky; David Bartholomae; Kenneth J. Rehage, eds. (1989). The Teaching of Writing. University of Chicago Press. ISBN 978-0-226-59949-6.
- David Bartholomae; Tony Petrosky, eds. (1994). Reading the Lives of Others: A Sequence for Writers. Bedford Books. ISBN 978-0-312-11511-1.
