= Anne Pierson Wiese =

American writer

- Born: 1964 (age 61–62); Minneapolis, Minnesota
- Education: Amherst College, New York University
- Writing career
- Genre: Poetry

Anne Pierson Wiese (born 1964 Minneapolis, Minnesota ), is an American poet.

== Life ==
Anne Pierson Wiese grew up in Brooklyn, New York. She is a graduate of Amherst College and New York University. Currently she works and lives in South Dakota with her husband, the writer Ben Miller.

Wiese's work has appeared in: The Nation, Prairie Schooner, Ploughshares, New England Review, Virginia Quarterly Review, Raritan, Antioch Review, Southwest Review, Alaska Quarterly Review, Hudson Review, Literary Imagination, Carolina Quarterly, Malahat Review, Ecotone, Hopkins Review, and many other journals.

== Awards and honors ==
- 2019 Amy Lowell Traveling Poetry Scholarship
- 2018 Fellowship in Poetry from the South Dakota Arts Council
- 2006 Walt Whitman Award
- 2005 Fellowship in Poetry from the New York Foundation for the Arts
- 2004 Second Prize in the Arvon International Poetry Competition sponsored by the Arvon Foundation in Great Britain
- 2004 "Discovery"/The Nation Poetry Contest
- 2002 First Place Poetry Prize in the Writers@Work Fellowship Competition.

== Works ==
- "Columbus Park". American Life in Poetry: Column 130.
- "Inscrutable Twist". American Life in Poetry: Column 199.
- "The Radio Tells Us It's Snowing in Montauk". Virginia Quarterly Review: 195. Spring 2009. Archived from the original on 2009-07-03.
- "Thinking about Moss". Ploughshares. Winter 2007–2008. Archived from the original on January 28, 2016.
- "Bay Ten". Del Sol Review (3).

=== Poetry books ===
- Floating City. Louisiana State University Press. 2007. ISBN 978-0-8071-3235-7. "Anne Pierson Wiese."

=== Plays ===
- Lewis W. Heniford, ed. (1995). "Coleman, SD". 1/2/3/4 for the show. Scarecrow Press. ISBN 978-0-8108-2985-5. (produced 1982)

=== Anthologies ===
- Toorawa, Shawkat (2015). The City That Never Sleeps: Poems of New York. Excelsior Editions (State University of New York). ISBN 978-1-4384-5615-7.
- Keillor, Garrison (2011). Good Poems: American Places. Viking. ISBN 978-0-670-02254-0.
- Ryan, Kay (2009). Poem in Your Pocket. Abrams Image. ISBN 978-0-8109-0636-5.
- Kasdorf, Julia; Tyrell, Michael (2006). "Last Night in Brooklyn". Broken Land: Poems of Brooklyn. New York University Press. ISBN 978-0-8147-4803-9.
