= Greg Glazner =

American poet (born 1958)

- Born: 1958 (age 67–68); Anson, Texas, U.S.
- Education: Hardin–Simmons University; University of Montana
- Occupation: Poet
- Writing career
- Notable awards: Walt Whitman Award (1991)

Greg Glazner (born 1958) is an American poet.

== Life ==
He graduated from Hardin–Simmons University, and the University of Montana, with an M.A. and M.F.A.

His work has appeared in Poetry, Ironwood, The Laurel Review, New England Journal, Pequod, Quarterly West, The Southern Poetry Review, and The Texas Review. He works on music/poetry projects with bands including Zeno's Run.

He was the Richard Hugo Visiting Writer at the University of Montana in 2002. He taught at the College of Santa Fe which is now closed.

He currently teaches at UC Davis.

== Awards ==
- 1991 Walt Whitman Award chosen by Charles Wright
- Bess Hokin Award from Poetry
- Lannan Foundation residency in Marfa
- 2005 NEA Fellowship

== Works ==
- Cellar Testament. William Paterson University Press. 2019 chapbook ISBN 9781727314335
- "Zeno's Cure Chapter 1"
- Singularity. W. W. Norton & Company, Incorporated. 1996. ISBN 978-0-393-03992-4.
- From the Iron Chair. W.W. Norton. 1992. ISBN 978-0-393-03098-3.
- Walking Two Landscapes. State Street Press. 1984. chapbook

=== Ploughshares ===
- "Orchard Bees". Ploughshares. Winter 1999–2000. Archived from the original on August 24, 2006.
- "from Zeno's Cure". Ploughshares. Winter 2001–02. Archived from the original on November 4, 2007.
