= Sandra Doller =

American poet and writer

Sandra Doller (formerly Miller) (born 1974 Washington, DC) is an American and Canadian poet and writer.

== Life ==
She attended Amherst College, University of Washington, and University of Chicago.

She received her MFA from the Iowa Writers' Workshop, where she was awarded the two-year Iowa Arts Fellowship.

Doller has taught at Hollins University, Cornell College, University of Iowa and was Distinguished Visiting Writer at Boise State University. She is currently a full Professor of Literature & Writing Studies and Film Studies at California State University San Marcos.

Sandra Doller is the founder and editor of the international inter-arts journal, 1913 a journal of forms and book publisher 1913 Press where she has edited over 20 book publications. She continues to serve as l'éditrice/editor-in-chief of 1913, which publishes contemporary writing alongside early modernist experiments. 1913 Press authors include: John Keene & Christopher Stackhouse, Shin Yu Pai, Biswamit Dwibedy, Arielle Greenberg & Rachel Zucker, Diane Wald, Karena Youtz, Jane Lewty, Scott McFarland, Monica Mody, Ronaldo Wilson, Mark Faunlagui, Vi Khi Nao, Diana Arterian, Srikanth Reddy & Dan Beachy-Quick, Megin Jimenez. 1913 Press also publishes an anthology of inter-translation, titled READ, co-edited by Sarah Riggs & Cole Swensen.

Doller's translation from the French of Éric Suchère's Mystérieuse won the inaugural Anomalous Press Translation Prize.

In Fall 2025, Doller's newest collection of poems, Not Now Now, was published by Rescue Press.

She lives in San Diego with her partner and collaborator, the poet and writer Ben Doller (formerly Doyle). In 2007, the two merged their last names: Doyle + Miller = Doller.

== Awards and fellowships ==
- 2001-2003: Iowa Arts Fellowship
- 2004: Paul Engle-James Michener Fellowship
- 2005: Runner-up for Sawtooth Prize from Ahsahta Press
- 2012: Winner of the Anomalous Press Translation Prize

== Works ==
- The Poetry Foundation
- Touch the Donkey
- from Not Now Now (on Poetry Now at The Poetry Foundation)
- from Leave Your Body Behind (Tarpaulin Sky)
- from Leave Your Body Behind (Eleven Eleven)
- from Memory of the Prose Machine (Drunken Boat)
- from Mystérieuse (Jacket2)
- "Doller". PennSound.

=== Books ===
- Oriflamme Ahsahta Press 2005
- Chora Ahsahta Press 2010
- Man Years Subito Press 2011
- Memory of the Prose Machine CutBank 2013
- Sonneteers Editions Eclipse 2014
- Leave Your Body Behind Les Figues 2014
- I'll Try This Hour above/ground press 2025
- Not Now Now Rescue Press 2025

=== Anthologies ===
- The New Census from Rescue Press
