= Christianne Balk =

American poet

- Born: 1953 (age 71–72)
- Education: Grinnell College
- Occupation: Poet

Christianne Balk (born 1953) is an American poet.

== Life ==
Balk graduated with honors in biology from Grinnell College and taught at the University of British Columbia. Her work has appeared in Pequod, Crazyhorse, Sulfur, The Centennial Review The Missouri Review, Sonora Review, Prairie Schooner Harper's, and The New Yorker. She lives in Seattle, Washington, with her husband and daughter.

== Awards ==
- 1985 Walt Whitman Award
- 1994 Verna Emory Award

== Works ==
=== Poetry ===
- Linda Svendsen, ed. (1990). "Elegy; How Stories Get Started". Words we call home. University of British Columbia Press. ISBN 978-0-7748-0367-0.
- "Lauds for St. Germaine Cousin". The Atlantic Monthly. September 2002.
- Bindweed. Collier Books. 1986. ISBN 978-0-02-627660-3.
- Desiring Flight. Purdue University Press. 1995. ISBN 978-1-55753-062-2.

=== Anthologies ===
- William J. Walsh, Jack (INT) Myers, ed. (2006). "Lauds for St. Germaine cousin; Dusk Choir; Dear Hippopotamus". Under the rock umbrella. Mercer University Press. ISBN 978-0-88146-047-6.

== See also ==
- American poetry
