= Threa Almontaser =

Yemeni-American poet and writer

- Education: North Carolina State University
- Occupation: Author
- Writing career
- Notable work: The Wild Fox of Yemen
- Notable awards: Walt Whitman award of the Academy of American Poets (2020)
- Website: Almontaser's website

Threa Almontaser is the author of The Wild Fox of Yemen, nominated for the National Book Award, the NAACP Image Award for Outstanding Literary Work, and the Pen/Voelcker Award for Poetry. Her debut has received widespread national recognition, including the Walt Whitman Award from the Academy of American Poets, the Maya Angelou Book Award, the Arab American Book Award, and the Brooklyn Public Library Literary Prize.

== Career ==
Almontaser's debut poetry collection, The Wild Fox of Yemen (Graywolf Press), was selected by Harryette Mullen as winner of the 2020 Walt Whitman Award established by the Academy of American Poets. She earned her MFA in Creative Writing from North Carolina State University.

Almontaser has been published for the Pushcart Prize, Best of The Net, and the Best New Poets series. She has received support from Duke, National Endowment for the Arts, and the Fulbright Program.

== Publications ==
- The Wild Fox of Yemen (Graywolf Press, 2021)
- In Hope That You're Dreaming (Hachette Book Group, forthcoming 2027)

== Awards and honors ==
- Financial Times and Library Journal Best Book of the Year
- A Chautauqua Literary and Scientific Circle selection
- Poetry Book Society’s Wild Card choice
- Longlisted for the National Book Award
- Longlisted for the Pen/Voelcker Award
- Nominated for the NAACP Image Award
- Finalist for the Kate Tufts Discovery Award
- Finalist for the John Pollard International Poetry Prize
- Finalist for the Michael Murphy Memorial Prize
- Winner of the inaugural Maya Angelou Book Award
- Winner of the Brooklyn Public Library Literary Prize
- Winner of the George Ellenbogen Poetry Award
- Winner of the Walt Whitman Award from the Academy of American poets
