= Chris Hosea =

American poet (born 1973)

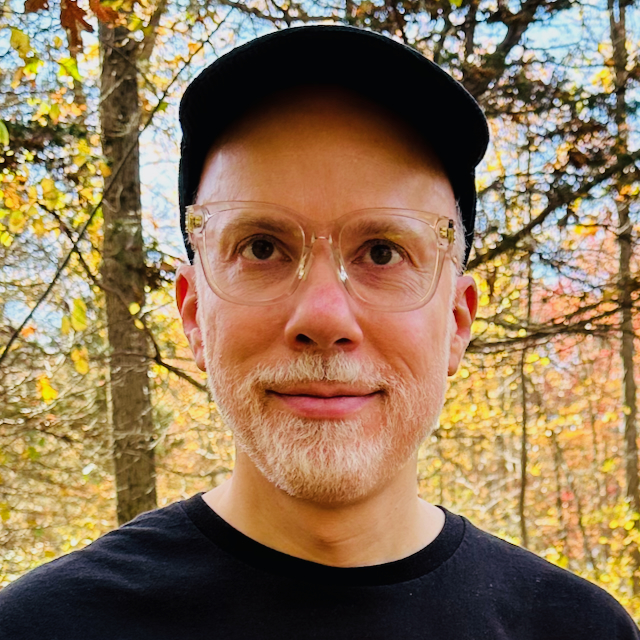
Poet Chris Hosea in 2023.

Chris Hosea (born 1973) is an American poet, artist, and writer. Hosea earned his AB in English from Harvard College (graduated 1998).

Hosea graduated in 2006 with a MFA in Poetry from the University of Massachusetts Amherst MFA Program for Poets & Writers, where he studied with James Tate, Peter Gizzi, and Dara Barrois/Dixon.

Poet John Ashbery selected Hosea's first poetry collection, Put Your Hands In, for the Walt Whitman Award from the Academy of American Poets.

== Put Your Hands In ==
Reviewers of Put Your Hands In have highlighted the book's emphasis on contradiction, the absurd, and sound, comparing it to the work of Language poets. Cristina M Rau critiqued the book's "distracting...references to hyper-contemporary technology that simply does not seem to fit: iPhones, Facebook, Uggs, Instagram," but added that "The pieces confuse and delight and reveal in a mostly successful way."

Publishers Weekly found that Put Your Hands In "juggles sexualized imagery, contemporary and historical pop cultural references, and an inventive approach to language that is as relentlessly provocative as it is approachable." Library Journal described Hosea's poetry as an "energized, tumbling mass of tight-stitched imagery" that "presents a sort of nutty roadshow of American culture."

Put Your Hands In's Boston book launch was hosted by The Harvard Advocate, and included supporting readings by Peter Gizzi, Josh Bell, and Christina Davis (poet), curator of the Woodberry Poetry Room at Harvard University.

== Double Zero ==
Hosea's second book of poems, Double Zero, was published in 2016 by Prelude. Poet Ben Fama called the collection "by turns melancholy, fragmented, and true to feeling....a book-length artist statement via linguistic selfies," and claimed that Double Zero "accurately maps the experience of the contemporary subject."

In a review of Double Zero, a writer for The Brooklyn Rail suggested Hosea's poetry was "a statement for our generation," saying that "Hosea's excess of language and sensation, more than any recent poetry collection, captures the unlimited economy of text and experience in 2016, a life that is constantly refreshing as our thumbs push forward on our personal screens, 'pictures quoted in pictures.'”

Writing in Jacket2, poet and critic Joe Fletcher described Double Zero as follows: "These poems reject the model of surface and substratum, linear chains of logic, narrative, or meditation — poetry that conceals and ultimately bestows upon the diligent reader a kernel of meaning. Instead, Hosea's poems are horizontally distributed linguistic planes, glittering splinters of the quotidian sliding through one another, shrapnel of heterogeneous temporalities." Double Zero was named a "Best Poetry Book of 2016" by Flavorwire and Entropy Magazine.

== Artwork, curation, and residencies ==
Hosea's visual-art collaboration with painter Kim Bennett was the subject of a 2015 exhibition at Bushwick, Brooklyn gallery Transmitter.

Also included in the Transmitter show were selected postcards from Hosea's ongoing mail-art project The postcard project (aka "What do you feel?) (2012-present). In 2020, The Metropolitan Museum of Art published a short video featuring The postcard project.

Hosea's performance piece Free Poetry (2014-ongoing), in which poems are improvised to audience specifications, has been performed at Ugly Duckling Presse and Art Omi, among other spaces.

So Many Fortresses (2010-2012), a poem-video collaboration with artist Jane Hsu, was performed in 2012 at Ran Tea House in Williamsburg, Brooklyn.

Hosea was curator of the 2012 group show "Ode to Street Hassle" at BronxArtSpace that featured Zoe Leonard, Amy Touchette, Myles Paige, Kim Bennett, Kimi Hodges, and others.

Hosea was curator of the Brooklyn-based Blue Letter Reading Series. Performers included poets Saeed Jones, Eileen Myles, and Tracy K. Smith, who read at Blue Letter's first event, in February 2011. The Blue Letter series was named "Best Reading Series (Poetry)" in New York City by The L Magazine.

Hosea was later curator of the One Bleecker poetry reading series at Codex Books in Noho, Manhattan, from 2018 to 2020. Featured poets included Andrew Durbin, Bunny Rogers, and Masha Tupitsyn.

Hosea is the recipient of fellowship residencies from Vermont Studio Center, Writers Omi Ledig House, and Elizabeth Bishop House in Great Village, Nova Scotia.

Hosea was also the recipient of 2016 and 2020 artist residencies from the Massachusetts Museum of Contemporary Art.

== Bibliography ==
- Put Your Hands In (LSU Press, 2014)
- Double Zero (Prelude, 2016)
