= Sjohnna McCray =

American poet (born 1972)

- Born: March 7, 1972
- Died: June 21, 2023 (aged 51)
- Education: Ohio University; University of Virginia; Teachers College, Columbia University
- Occupations: Poet, teacher
- Writing career
- Notable work: Rapture
- Notable awards: Walt Whitman Award (2015)
- Website: Sjohnna McCray's website

Sjohnna McCray (March 7, 1972 – June 21, 2023) was an American poet. He was the author of Rapture, winner of the Walt Whitman award of the Academy of American Poets in 2015.

== Biography ==
Sjohnna McCray was born in Cincinnati, Ohio, on March 7, 1972. He earned a BS from Ohio University in 1995, and later obtained a MFA in Poetry from the University of Virginia.

McCray published his first poetry collection, Rapture (Graywolf Press) in 2016. The collection was chosen by United States Poet Laureate, Tracy K. Smith, as the winner of the 2015 Walt Whitman Award. Smith wrote of the collection: "These poems are so beautifully crafted, so courageous in their truth-telling, and so full of what I like to think of as lyrical wisdom—the visceral revelations that only music, gesture and image, working together, can impart—that not only did they stop me in my tracks as a judge, but they changed me as a person."

McCray was the recipient of Ohio University's Emerson Poetry Prize and was nominated for a Pushcart Poetry Prize. He later studied at Teachers College, Columbia University, where he received an MA in English Education.

McCray taught school in New York City, Chicago and Phoenix. He lived in Savannah, Georgia, where he taught English at Savannah State University.

== Awards ==
- Walt Whitman award, Rapture, (2015)
- Nominee Pushcart Prize
- Winner Ohio University's Emerson Poetry Prize
