= Jonathan Thirkield =

American poet

- Education: Wesleyan University, University of Iowa's Writers' Workshop

Jonathan Thirkield is an American poet, currently living in New York City.

== Life ==
Thirkield was born and raised in New York City. He graduated from Wesleyan University, and was a Truman Capote Fellow at the University of Iowa's Writers' Workshop. Thirkield was born and raised in New York City.

He achieved critical acclaim for his debut poetry collection, The Waker's Corridor, which won the 2008 Walt Whitman Award, as selected by Linda Bierds and presented by the Academy of American Poets.

His poems have been featured in several journals, including WebConjunctions, The Colorado Review, and American Letters & Commentary, among others.

== Works ==
- The Waker's Corridor, LSU Press. ISBN 9780807134412, OCLC 637408865
- Infinity Pool, University of Chicago Press. ISBN 9780226834771, OCLC 1451797900
