= Sally Van Doren =

American poet

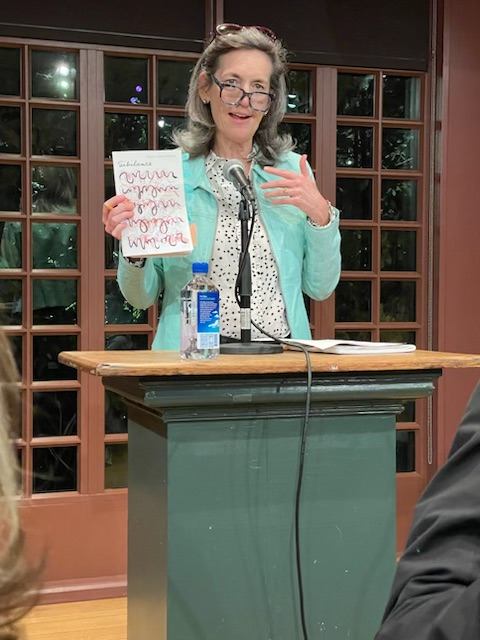
- Van Doren in 2023
- Born: Sarah Van Cleve; St. Louis, Missouri, U.S.
- Education: Princeton University (BA); University of Missouri, St. Louis (MFA)
- Spouse: John Van Doren (m. 1987)
- Relatives: Charles Van Doren (father-in-law); Mark Van Doren (cousin)
- Writing career
- Genre: Poetry

Sally Van Doren (born 1961, St. Louis, MO) is an American poet and visual artist. She is the author of four poetry collections, among them her first book, Sex At Noon Taxes, which received the 2007 Walt Whitman Award from the Academy of American Poets.

== Life and work ==
Van Doren was born and raised in St. Louis, Missouri, the third of four children of Georgia Dunbar Van Cleve, a community volunteer, and William Moore Van Cleve, the former chairman of the St. Louis-based law firm Bryan Cave. She attended Reed Elementary School, Mary Institute, and graduated from Phillips Academy in Andover, MA, where she met her future husband, the art dealer John Van Doren, grandson of Pulitzer-prize winning poet and Columbia University professor Mark Van Doren and author Dorothy Van Doren. She received a degree in Comparative Literature from Princeton University in 1984 with a focus on Italian Renaissance Epic Poetry.

Van Doren began her professional life in Santa Fe, NM where she served as news director for KTRC Radio, Public Information Director for the City of Santa Fe, and Director of the Santa Fe Arts Commission. After living in New York from 1990 to 1993, her family moved to St. Louis where she received an MFA in creative writing from the University of Missouri-St. Louis. She then taught in the St. Louis Public Schools, the St. Louis County Detention Center, the Washington University Summer Writers Institute and curated the Sunday Poetry Workshop Series for the St. Louis Poetry Center.

Van Doren taught at the 92^{nd} Street Y in New York from 2015-2017 and from 2018-2020 studied studio art at Hunter College, the School of Visual Art and the New York Studio School. In spring of 2020, she established her art studio in West Cornwall, CT and in 2023 began leading monthly poetry workshops for the Scoville Memorial Library in Salisbury, CT. She serves on the board of the Five Points Center for the Arts in Torrington, CT and the advisory board for Louisiana State University Press.

=== Writing ===
Van Doren’s poetry has been featured on NPR and PBS and published in magazines and journals including American Letters and Commentary, American Poet, Barrow Street, Boulevard, Cincinnati Review, Colorado Review, december, Hubbub, Jacket2, LIT, The Moth, The New Republic, Poetry Daily, Poetry Ireland Review, Poetry London, Poet Lore, Poets.org, Prairie Schooner, Rhino, River Styx, South Carolina Review, Southern Review, Southwest Review, Western Humanities Review and Verse Daily.

Excerpts from her ongoing experimental epic poem, “The Sense Series” served as the lyrics for a multi-media performance at the Contemporary Art Museum in St. Louis in 2007. Her poem, “Preposition” was featured as an animated film by the Poetry Foundation.

=== Visual art ===
Van Doren’s visual art has been featured in The Nashville Review, december, and 2RiverView and appears on the cover of “The Difference is Spreading: Fifty Contemporary Poets on Fifty Poems” (UPenn Press 2022) and two of her books. She exhibits nationally in solo and group shows and her work is held in distinguished private and corporate collections.

== Awards ==
Van Doren was nominated for the 2019 Pushcart Prize for her poem, “Funk,” which appeared in Volume 29.2 of december magazine.

Van Doren was awarded the 2007 Walt Whitman Award from the Academy of American Poets for her first collection of poems, "Sex at Noon Taxes," which was published in the spring of 2008 by LSU Press.

She was a semi-finalist in the 2006 "Discovery"/The Nation Poetry Contest.

Van Doren received the Kenneth O. Hanson Award in 2013 from Hubbub magazine for her poem, “Color Theory.” She is the recipient of the Loy Ledbetter Award from the St. Louis Poetry Center. She also was a finalist in the Poets Out Loud Prize in 2012-2013.

== Works ==
- "Roadside Condo Unit # 4; On Belay". Homestead Review. 18 (1). Hartnell College. Fall–Winter 2001. Archived from the original on May 28, 2010.
- "Bagged; Girlhood". 2river Review. 11 (2). Winter 2007.
- "All, Free, Clear; Fight". 2river Review. 11 (4). Summer 2007.
- "Metronome", Verse Daily
- "Defiance". The Writer's Almanac with Garrison Keillor. NPR. October 4, 2017.
- "The Book Of Usable Minutes". The Writer's Almanac with Garrison Keillor. NPR. October 11, 2017.
- "Color Theory". The Art Critic review. Happening in the Hills. December, 2017.
- Visual Poetry at the Cornwall Library: Sally Van Doren's Polysemic Drawings" Lakeville Journal Review. November, 2017.
- "Housewife as Poet" American Life in Poetry. November, 2018.

Van Doren's poetry has also been published in several magazines and journals, including American Letters and Commentary, Cimarron Review, 5AM, Hubbub, Lumina, Mudlark, The New Republic, The Normal School, poets.org, Rhino, South Carolina Review, Tinge, Valparaiso Poetry Review, and Western Humanities Review.

=== Poetry books ===
- Sex at Noon Taxes. Louisiana State University Press. March 2008. ISBN 978-0-8071-3311-8.
- Possessive. Louisiana State University Press. December 2012. ISBN 978-0-8071-4488-6.
- Promise. Louisiana State University Press. August 2017. ISBN 978-0-8071-6691-8.
- Sibilance. Louisiana State University Press. September 2023. ISBN 978-0-8071-8018-1
