= Hannah Sanghee Park =

American poet (born 1986)

- Education: University of Washington; Iowa Writers' Workshop; University of Southern California
- Occupations: Poet, writer
- Writing career
- Notable work: The Same-Different
- Notable awards: Walt Whitman award (2014)

Hannah Sanghee Park is an American poet. She is the author of the poetry collection, The Same-Different, winner of the 2014 Walt Whitman award of the Academy of American Poets.

== Early life and education ==
Hannah Sanghee Park was born in Tacoma, Washington to Korean parents. She spent her early years in Federal Way, Washington. Park earned a BA from the University of Washington and an MFA from the Iowa Writers' Workshop.

After receiving her MFA, Park was awarded a Fulbright Fellowship creative writing grant to study and write in Seoul, Korea. Park's work in Korea resulted in a 2013 Ruth Lilly Fellowship from the Poetry Foundation.

Park earned a MFA in Writing for Screen and Television from the University of Southern California's School of Cinematic Arts.

== Career ==
Park is the author of a chapbook, Ode Days Ode (The Catenary Press, 2011).

Park's first poetry collection, The Same-Different was selected by Rae Armantrout as winner of the 2014 Walt Whitman award of the Academy of American Poets. The book was published by the Louisiana State University Press in 2015.

Park lives and works in Los Angeles.
