= Laura Gilpin (poet) =

American nurse and poet (1950–2007)

Laura Crafton Gilpin
- Born: October 10, 1950; Wisconsin, US
- Died: February 15, 2007 (age 56); Fairhope, Alabama, US
- Education: Sarah Lawrence College (BA); Columbia University (MFA)
- Occupations: Poet and nurse
- Notable work: The Hocus-Pocus of the Universe (1977)
- Awards: Walt Whitman Award (1976)

Laura Crafton Gilpin (October 10, 1950 – February 15, 2007) was an American poet, nurse, and advocate for hospital reform.

== Early life and education ==
Gilpin was born to Robert Crafton Gilpin and Bertha Burghard. She attended Sarah Lawrence College and Columbia University.

== Career ==
In 1976, Gilpin was awarded the Walt Whitman Award by the Academy of American Poets for her book of poems titled The Hocus-Pocus of the Universe. She was selected by William Stafford. Her work was also published in the magazine Poetry. Gilpin later wrote another book of poetry, titled The Weight of a Soul, which was published posthumously in 2008.

Chicago Review describes Gilpin as a confessional poet, "but without the frantic stripping of the soul that often constitutes confessional poetry". Chicago Review praises her poetry as plain, unselfconscious, and elegant, with tentative endings that leave the reader feeling "that there is more to be said, some conclusion to be drawn, some emotion to be underlined." Her poetic style is self-effacing, "slow and subdued, sometimes wry and sometimes sad, always rich and subtle", and marked by "prosy and paratactic" tendencies. The tone of her poems is "matter of fact" and the grammar marked by "cool clarity". She rarely uses more than a single comparison in a poem, and the economy of her imagery allows her "to exercise the subtle modulations of tone which are her true strength", with metaphor conveyed through diction.

The American Poetry Review describes Gilpin's poetry as "sensuous, sweet, affectionate, utterly human", and marked by a "suppleness of phrasing and strength of cadence." Library Journal reviewed her poetry negatively, saying that she attempts the "precision of phrasing, vocabulary, tone, and rhythm" that invests William Carlos Williams's poetry with "infinite resonance", but that she lacks an awareness of "the complexity involved in such a gesture".

In 1981, Gilpin became a registered nurse. She was a founding member of Planetree, which has been described as a "pioneering organization dedicated to humanizing patient care in hospitals". Gilpin worked to develop and implement hospital care centered around patients.

== Personal life ==
Gilpin died of glioblastoma on February 15, 2007, in Fairhope, Alabama, at age 56.

== Bibliography ==
- The Hocus-Pocus of the Universe (Doubleday, 1977)
- The Weight of a Soul (Franklin Street Press, 2008)
