= Academy of American Poets First Book Award =

Poetry award

The Academy of American Poets First Book Award
- Awarded for: An outstanding manuscript written by a poet who has not yet published a book.
- Country: United States
- Presented by: Academy of American Poets
- First award: 1975
- Website: poets.org/academy-american-poets/prizes/first-book-award

The Academy of American Poets First Book Award is a poetry award administered by the Academy of American Poets. Named after poet Walt Whitman from 1975 to 2020, the award is based on a competition of book-length poetry manuscripts by American poets who have not yet published a book. The prize includes publication of the manuscript by Graywolf Press, distribution of the book though the Academy, a $5,000 cash prize, and an all-expenses-paid six-week residency at the Civitella Ranieri Center in the Umbrian region of Italy.

The Library of Congress includes the Academy of American Poets First Book Award among distinctions noted for poets, as does The New York Times, which also occasionally publishes articles about new awards.

The award was established in 1975. In a New York Times opinion piece from 1985, the novelist John Barth noted that 1475 manuscripts had been entered into one of the Whitman Award competitions, which exceeded the number of subscribers to some poetry journals. From 1992 to 2015, Louisiana State University Press published each volume as part of its "Walt Whitman Award Series"; winning volumes are now published by Graywolf Press. The Academy purchases and distributes copies to its associate members, along with copies of the winning volume for the James Laughlin Award. Since the academy buys 6,000 copies for its members, and the average print run for a poet's first book is 3,000 copies, a Academy of American Poets First Book Award guarantees a best seller in the tiny poetry market.

== Recipients ==
Year	Poet	Book	Judge
2025	Daniel Moysaenko	Overtakelessness (Graywolf Press)	Alberto Ríos
2024	Robin Walter	Little Mercy (Graywolf Press)	Victoria Chang
2023	Sara Daniele Rivera	The Blue Mimes (Graywolf Press)	Eduardo C. Corral
2022	Kweku Abimbola	Saltwater Demands a Psalm (Graywolf Press)	Tyehimba Jess
2021	Kemi Alabi	Against Heaven (Graywolf Press)	Claudia Rankine
2020	Threa Almontaser	The Wild Fox of Yemen (Graywolf Press)	Harryette Mullen
2019	Leah Naomi Green	The More Extravagant Feast (Graywolf Press)	Li-Young Lee
2018	Emily Skaja	Brute (Graywolf Press)	Joy Harjo
2017	Jenny Xie	Eye Level (Graywolf Press)	Juan Felipe Herrera
2016	Mai Der Vang	Afterland (Graywolf Press)	Carolyn Forché
2015	Sjohnna McCray	Rapture (Graywolf Press)	Tracy K. Smith
2014	Hannah Sanghee Park	The Same-Different (LSU Press)	Rae Armantrout
2013	Chris Hosea	Put Your Hands In (LSU Press)	John Ashbery
2012	Matt Rasmussen	Black Aperture (LSU Press)	Jane Hirshfield
2011	Elana Bell	Eyes, Stones (LSU Press)	Fanny Howe
2010	Carl Adamshick	Curses and Wishes (LSU Press)	Marvin Bell
2009	J. Michael Martinez	Heredities (LSU Press)	Juan Felipe Herrera
2008	Jonathan Thirkield	The Waker's Corridor (LSU Press)	Linda Bierds
2007	Sally Van Doren	Sex at Noon Taxes (LSU Press)	August Kleinzahler
2006	Anne Pierson Wiese	Floating City (LSU Press)	Kay Ryan
2005	Mary Rose O'Reilley	Half Wild (LSU Press)	Mary Oliver
2004	Geri Doran	Resin (LSU Press)	Henri Cole
2003	Tony Tost	Invisible Bride (LSU Press)	Carolyn D. Wright
2002	Sue Kwock Kim	Notes from the Divided Country (LSU Press)	Yusef Komunyakaa
2001	John Canaday	The Invisible World (LSU Press)	Sherod Santos
2000	Ben Doller	Radio, Radio (LSU Press)	Susan Howe
1999	Judy Jordan	Carolina Ghost Woods (LSU Press)	James Tate
1998	Jan Heller Levi	Once I Gazed at You in Wonder (LSU Press)	Alice Fulton
1997	Barbara Ras	Bite Every Sorrow (LSU Press)	C. K. Williams
1996	Joshua Clover	Madonna anno domini (LSU Press)	Jorie Graham
1995	Nicole Cooley	Resurrection (LSU Press)	Cynthia Macdonald
1994	Jan Richman	Because the Brain Can Be Talked into Anything (LSU Press)	Robert Pinsky
1993	Alison Hawthorne Deming	Science and Other Poems (LSU Press)	Gerald Stern
1992	Stephen Yenser	The Fire in All Things (LSU Press)	Richard Howard
1991	Greg Glazner	From the Iron Chair (W. W. Norton)	Charles Wright
1990	Elaine Terranova	The Cult of the Right Hand (Doubleday)	Rita Dove
1989	Martha Hollander	The Game of Statues (Atlantic Monthly Press)	W.S. Merwin
1988	April Bernard	Blackbird Bye Bye (Random House)	Amy Clampitt
1987	Judith Baumel	The Weight of Numbers (Wesleyan U. Press)	Mona Van Duyn
1986	Chris Llewellyn	Fragments from the Fire (Viking)	Maxine Kumin
1985	Christianne Balk	Bindweed (Macmillan)	Anthony Hecht
1984	Eric Pankey	For the New Year (Atheneum)	Mark Strand
1983	Christopher Gilbert	Across the Mutual Landscape (Graywolf Press)	Michael S. Harper
1982	Anthony Petrosky	Jurgis Petraskas (Louisiana State University Press)	Philip Levine
1981	Alberto Ríos	Whispering to Fool the Wind (Sheep Meadow Press)	Donald Justice
1980	Jared Carter	Work, for the Night is Coming (Macmillan)	Galway Kinnell
1979	David Bottoms	Shooting Rats at the Bibb County Dump (Morrow)	Robert Penn Warren
1978	Karen Snow	Wonders (Viking)	Louis Simpson
1977	Lauren Shakely	Guilty Bystander (Random House)	Diane Wakoski
1976	Laura Crafton Gilpin	The Hocus-Pocus of the Universe (Doubleday)	William Stafford
1975	Reg Saner	Climbing into the Roots (Harper & Row)	William Meredith
