= Tré Turner =

American football player (born 2000)

Profile
- Position: Wide receiver

Personal information
- Born: April 21, 2000 (age 26); Greensboro, North Carolina, U.S.
- Listed height: 6 ft 3 in (1.91 m)
- Listed weight: 205 lb (93 kg)

Career information
- High school: Northwest Guilford (Greensboro, North Carolina)
- College: Virginia Tech (2018–2021)
- NFL draft: 2022: undrafted

Career history
- Las Vegas Raiders (2022)*; Winnipeg Blue Bombers (2023)*
- * Offseason or practice squad member only
- Stats at Pro Football Reference

Tré Turner (born April 21, 2000) is an American former football wide receiver. He played college football at Virginia Tech.

== Early life ==
Turner grew up in Greensboro, North Carolina and attended Northwest Guilford High School, where he played basketball and football. Turner committed to play college football at Virginia Tech over offers from North Carolina and Miami (Florida).

== College career ==
Turner played in 12 games as a freshman and caught 26 passes for 535 receiving yards and four touchdowns. He finished his sophomore season with 34 receptions for 553 yards and four touchdowns. As a junior, Turner had 34 receptions for 529 yards with three touchdowns. As a senior, Turner caught 40 passes for a team-leading 675 yards and three touchdowns. Turner finished his collegiate career with 134 receptions and 2,292 receiving yards, both fifth in school history, and 14 touchdown receptions.

== Professional career ==
Pre-draft measurables
Height	Weight	Arm length	Hand span	Wingspan	40-yard dash	10-yard split	20-yard split	20-yard shuttle	Three-cone drill	Vertical jump	Broad jump
6 ft 1 3/8 in (1.86 m)	184 lb (83 kg)	30 3/4 in (0.78 m)	8 1/2 in (0.22 m)	6 ft 2 1/4 in (1.89 m)	4.51 s	1.55 s	2.54 s	4.51 s	7.06 s	31.5 in (0.80 m)	9 ft 5 in (2.87 m)
All values from NFL Combine/Pro Day

After being initially announced as one of ten undrafted free agents signed by Minnesota Vikings in 2022, Turner ultimately signed with the Las Vegas Raiders, who had offered him better terms. He was waived on May 16, 2022.

On March 14, 2023, Turner signed with the Winnipeg Blue Bombers of the Canadian Football League (CFL). On May 30, 2023, Turner was released by the Blue Bombers.

== Personal life ==
Turner's older brother, P. J. Hairston, played college basketball at the University of North Carolina and for the Charlotte Hornets and Memphis Grizzlies of the National Basketball Association.
