= Creativity Research Journal =

- Discipline: Creativity
- Language: English
- Edited by: Adam Green

Publication details
- History: 1988–present
- Publisher: Taylor & Francis
- Frequency: Quarterly
- Impact factor: 4.8 (2025)

Standard abbreviations
- ISO 4: Creat. Res. J.

Indexing
- ISSN: 1040-0419 (print); 1532-6934 (web)
- LCCN: sf93092311
- OCLC no.: 1109413249

Links
- Journal homepage; Online access; Online archive

The Creativity Research Journal is a quarterly peer-reviewed academic journal covering research on all aspects of creativity. It is the official journal of the Society for the Neuroscience of Creativity. The editor-in-chief is Adam Green, and the senior associate editors are Roger Beaty and James C. Kaufman. The journal was established in 1988 by Mark A. Runco, currently editor emeritus, and is published by Taylor & Francis.

== Abstracting and indexing ==
The journal is abstracted and indexed in:

- Current Contents/Social & Behavioral Sciences
- EBSCO databases
- Ovid databases
- ProQuest databases
- Scopus
- Social Sciences Citation Index

According to the Journal Citation Reports, the journal has a 2025 impact factor of 4.8.
