= Djamila Debèche =

French-Algerian writer

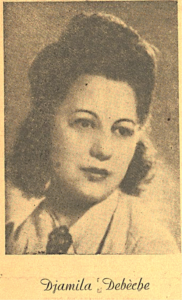
- Born: June 30, 1926; Aïn Oulmene, Algeria
- Died: August 10, 2010 (aged 84); Paris, France
- Occupation: Writer

Djamila Debèche (June 30, 1926 – August 10, 2010), sometimes written Debêche or Debbeche, was a French-Algerian feminist writer. She was a pioneering journalist and novelist in Algeria, where she was one of the first women writers of the French colonial period.

== Biography ==
Djamila Debèche was born in 1926 (although some sources place the year of her birth as early as 1910) in Aïn Oulmene, Sétif province, Algeria. She was orphaned at two years old and was raised by her grandparents. She was educated in Algiers, where she lived until age 16.

In 1942, Debèche began hosting a radio program for women, which was particularly focused on the importance of education for girls. A few years later, in 1946, she published an article on "Muslim Women in Society" in the magazine Terre d'Afrique. The following year, she launched a monthly publication, the feminist magazine L’Action, which ran for 10 issues. As the editor of that magazine, she participated in an international women's conference in Paris in the autumn of 1947.

That same year, Debèche published her first novel, Leïla, jeune fille d'Algérie ("Leïla, Young Girl From Algeria"). The main character, Leïla, is of Saharan origin, but she gets the chance to attend a Catholic girls' school in Algiers and is adopted by a European family, then works as a teacher for young women in southern Algeria. Debèche subsequently published two essays in Algiers: Les Musulmans algériens et la scolarisation ("Algerian Muslims and Education") in 1950 and L'Enseignement de la langue arabe en Algérie et le droit de vote aux femmes algériennes ("Arabic Language Education in Algeria and Algerian Women's Right to Vote") in 1951.

In addition to her writing, Debèche served as the first president of Algeria's PEN Club.

The Algerian War began in 1954, and Debèche chose to move to France and became a French citizen. However, she worked to maintain cultural exchanges with her community in her home country.

In 1955, she debuted her second novel, Aziza, which was published in Algeria. Aziza won the Prix Roberge from the Académie Française in 1957. Her next work, an essay titled Les grandes étapes de l'évolution féminine en pays d'Islam ("The Great Stages of Women's Evolution in an Islamic Country"), was published in France in 1959.

Though she was a pioneer among early Algerian women writers in the French colonial period, Debèche slipped into obscurity in her later years. She died in 2010, in Paris.

== Selected works ==
=== Novels ===
- 1947: Leïla, jeune fille d'Algérie.
- 1955: Aziza. (Received the Prix Roberge from the Académie Française in 1957)

=== Essays ===
- 1950: Les Musulmans algériens et la scolarisation.
- 1951: L'Enseignement de la langue arabe en Algérie et le droit de vote aux femmes algériennes.
- 1959: Les grandes étapes de l'évolution féminine en pays d'Islam.
