= Judith Baumel =

American poet

- Born: October 9, 1956 (age 70)
- Occupation: Poet

Academic background
- Education: Radcliffe College; Harvard Advocate; Johns Hopkins University

Judith Baumel (born October 9, 1956 in Bronx, New York) is an American poet.

== Life ==
Judith Baumel grew up in New York City, attending the Bronx High School of Science. She graduated from Radcliffe College, magna cum laude, studying with Robert Lowell, Robert Fitzgerald, Elizabeth Bishop, Robert B. Shaw, James Richardson, and Jane Shore. She graduated from Johns Hopkins University, where she studied with Richard Howard, Cynthia Macdonald, and David St. John. She taught at Boston University, and Harvard University.

In 1985, she married the poet and journalist David Ghitelman, an early editor of AGNI magazine. They divorced in 1999. Her current partner is Philip Alcabes, professor of Public Health at Hunter College, City University of New York, and author of Dread: How Fear and Fantasy Have Fueled Epidemics from The Black Death to Avian Flu (Public Affairs 2009).

She was director of the Poetry Society of America from 1985 to 1988.

Her work has appeared in The Nation, The Paris Review, Ploughshares, Poetry, The Yale Review, AGNI, The New York Times, and The New Yorker.

She lives in New York City and teaches at Adelphi University, and City College of New York. Her blog is at http://www.judithbaumel.com

== Awards ==
- 1987 Walt Whitman Award

== Work ==
=== Books ===
- Thorny, Arrowsmith Press, 2022. ISBN 978-1737615668
- Passeggiate, Arrowsmith Press, 2019
- The Kangaroo Girl. GenPop Books. 2011. ISBN 978-0-9823-5943-3.
- Now: a collection of poems. Miami University Press. 1996. ISBN 978-1-881163-14-5.
- The Weight of Numbers. Wesleyan University Press. 1988. ISBN 978-0-8195-2144-6.

=== Periodicals ===
- "Mr. Goldfish and Vicky". Mamazine.
- "Vandalism". The New Criterion. February 1996.
- "Our Differences". AGNI. 21. 1984.

=== Memoir ===
- Jeffrey Meyers, ed. (1988). "Robert Lowell: The Teacher". Robert Lowell, interviews and memoirs. University of Michigan Press. ISBN 978-0-472-10089-7.

=== Anthologies ===
- Nicholas Christopher, ed. (1989). Under 35: the new generation of American poets. Anchor Book. ISBN 978-0-385-26035-0. "Judith Baumel."
- William J. Walsh, Jack (INT) Myers, ed. (2006). Under the rock umbrella: contemporary American poets, 1951-1977. Mercer University Press. ISBN 978-0-88146-047-6.
