= April Bernard =

American poet

- Born: 1956 (age 69–70); New England, U.S.
- Education: Harvard University
- Occupation: Poet

April Anne Bernard (born 1956) is an American writer, poet, and novelist.

== Early life and education ==
Bernard was born and raised in Williamstown, Massachusetts. Her father, Walter Bernard, held a BA from the University of New Hampshire and a PhD from MIT. For many years he was a research scientist at Sprague Electric. Her mother, Claire, was a teacher, writer and librarian who taught 5th and 6th grade at the local elementary school.

Bernard graduated from Mt. Greylock Regional High School in 1974. She attended Harvard University, earning a BA magna cum laude in History and Literature in 1978. At Harvard, Bernard was elected to Phi Beta Kappa and was the recipient of several awards, including the Sonier Thesis Prize in History and Literature, the Untermeyer Poetry Prize, and the Roger Conant Hatch Prize for Lyric Poetry.

She earned a master's degree from Yale University in 1981.

== Career ==
=== Writing ===
She has worked as a senior editor at Vanity Fair, Premiere, and Manhattan, inc. Her work has appeared in The New Yorker, the Boston Review, AGNI, Ploughshares, Parnassus, and The New York Review of Books.

In 2017, Bernard was deputy editor of US Magazine.

=== Academia ===
In the early 1990s, Bernard taught at Amherst College. She later taught at writing at as part of the MFA program at Bennington College from 1999 to 2009.

In Fall 2003, Bernard was the Sidney Harman Writer-in-Residence at Baruch College.

She is a professor of English and director of creative writing at Skidmore College in Saratoga Springs, New York.

== Personal life ==
In 1981, Bernard married Peter Craig Freeman, the director of the Blum-Heiman Gallery in New York. Bernard later was married to writer Marc Robinson.

She has a son, Henry Robinson.

== Honors and awards ==
- 2003 Guggenheim Fellowship
- 2006 Stover Memorial Prize in Poetry

== Published works ==
=== Full-length poetry collections ===
- The World Behind the World: Poems. W.W. Norton & Co. March 14, 2023. ISBN 978-1324036203.
- Brawl & Jag: Poems. W.W. Norton & Co. March 28, 2016. ISBN 978-0393351736.
- Romanticism: Poems. W.W. Norton & Co. June 1, 2009. ISBN 978-0-393-06807-8.
- Swan Electric. W. W. Norton. 2002. ISBN 978-0-393-05114-8.
- Psalms. W. W. Norton & Company, Incorporated. 1995. ISBN 978-0-393-31304-8.
- Blackbird Bye Bye. Random House. 1989. ISBN 9780394575360.

=== Novels ===
- Pirate Jenny. W. W. Norton & Company. 1990. ISBN 978-0-393-33430-2.
- Miss Fuller. Steerforth Press. 2012. ISBN 978-1-58642-195-3.

=== Anthology publications ===
- Phillis Levin, ed. (November 2001). The Penguin Book of the Sonnet: 500 Years of a Classic Tradition in English. Penguin. ISBN 978-0-14-058929-0.
- Molly McQuade (2000). By Herself: Women Reclaim Poetry. Graywolf Press. ISBN 978-1-55597-297-4. "April Bernard poet."
