= Karen Snow =

American poet

- Occupation: Poet
- Writing career
- Notable awards: Walt Whitman Award (1978)

Karen Snow is an American poet. Her work has appeared in the Beloit Poetry Journal, Chowder Review, Montserrat Review, Heartland, Michigan Quarterly Review, Lake Superior Review, ANON, Prairie Schooner, and the North American Review. Karen Snow is a pseudonym.

== Awards and honours ==
In 1978, Snow received the Walt Whitman Award for her book Wonders. This prize was awarded annually to a poet who had not previously published poetry in a book. Snow was 54 at the time of the award.

== Works ==
=== Poetry ===
- "Afterglow". Beloit Poetry Journal. 22. 1971.
- "Grit". Beloit Poetry Journal. 24. Fall 1973.
- "Clover". Beloit Poetry Journal. 29. Fall 1978.
- "Retirement". Beloit Poetry Journal. 30. Summer 1980.
- "Hare". Beloit Poetry Journal. 42. Spring 1992.
- Wonders. Viking Press. 1980. ISBN 978-0-670-77917-8.
- Outsiders. Countryman Press. 1984. ISBN 978-0-88150-011-0.

=== Novel ===
- Willo. Street Fiction Press. 1976. re-issued in 1981 by Pinnacle Books.

=== Anthologies ===
- Thomas, Harry; Lavine, Steven (1981). The Hopwood Anthology. University of Michigan Press. ISBN 978-0-472-09328-1. "Karen Snow poet."
- Steve Kowit, ed. (1988). The Maverick poets. Gorilla Press.
- Robert Penn Warren, ed. (1984). Fifty years of American poetry. Academy of American Poets.

=== Juvenile collection ===
- Karen Snow, ed. (1995). Prairie dog dreams : a collection of poems. Illustrator Abraham Jones (ill). Wooded Hill Productions. ISBN 978-1-886635-00-5.
- Sigmund A. Boloz, Karen Snow (1996). The Learning Never Stops: A Collection of Poems. Illustrators Antoinette C. Boloz, Abraham Jones. Wooded Hill Productions. ISBN 978-1-886635-10-4.
- Sigmund A. Boloz (1997). Karen Snow (ed.). The Distance Across One's Heart: Poetry for the Writer. Illustrator Abraham Jones. Wooded Hill Productions. ISBN 978-1-886635-12-8.
