= Elana Bell =

American poet and educator

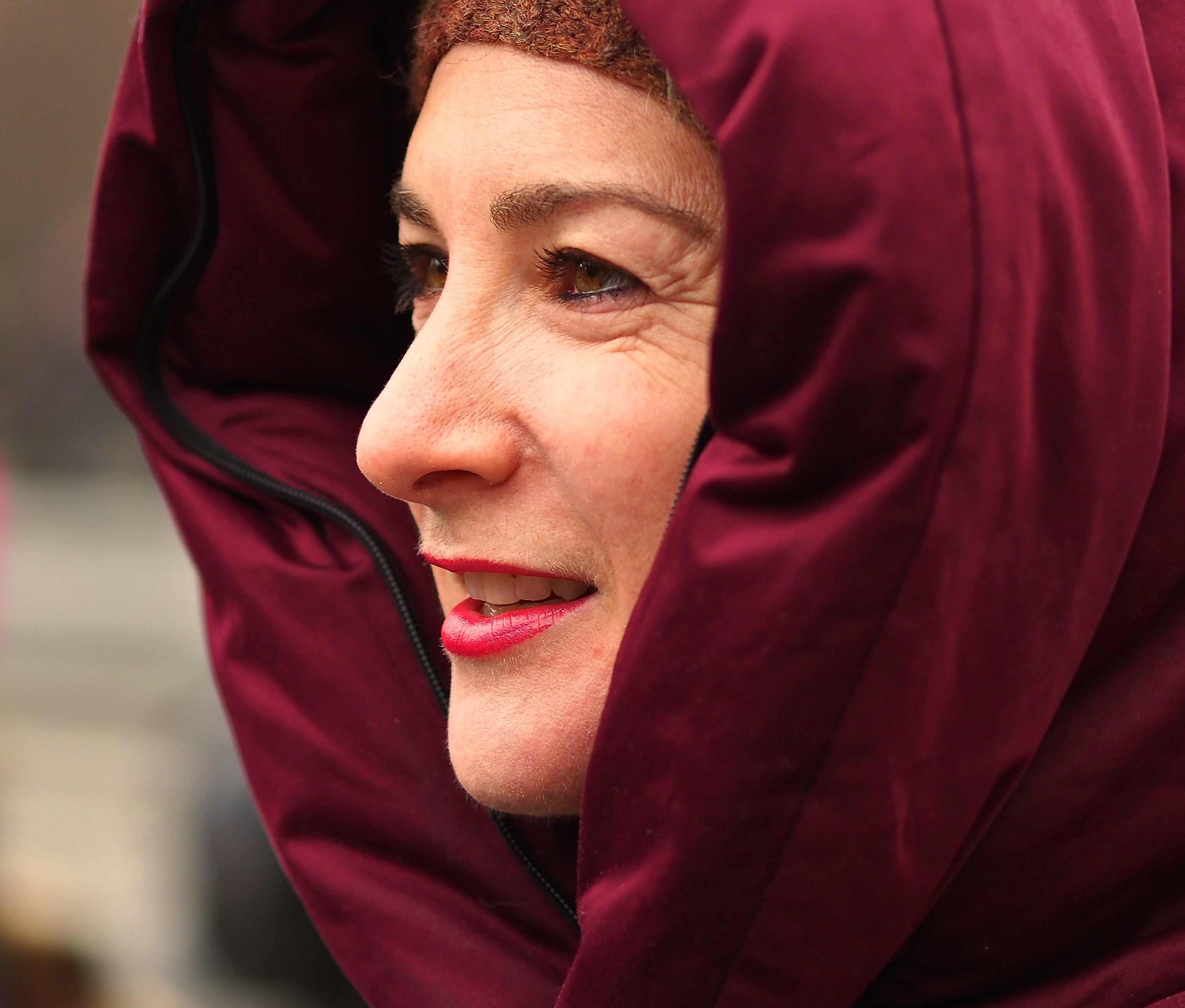
- Bell during a rally at Washington Square, New York, in December 2014
- Born: Venice Beach, California, U.S.
- Education: Sarah Lawrence College (BA, 1999; MFA, 2008)
- Occupations: Poet, educator
- Spouse: Jai Chakrabarti
- Writing career
- Notable works: Eyes, Stones
- Notable awards: Walt Whitman award (2011)
- Website: www.elanabell.com

Elana Bell is an American poet and educator. She is the author of the poetry collection, Eyes, Stones, winner of the 2011 Walt Whitman award of the Academy of American Poets. Bell is also the author of Mother Country, published by BOA Editions in 2020.

== Biography ==
Elana Bell was born in Venice Beach, California. She received a B.A. from Sarah Lawrence College in 1999 and an M.F.A. in creative writing at the college in 2008.

Bell's manuscript, Eyes, Stones, was awarded the 2011 Walt Whitman award of the Academy of American Poets. The poetry collection was published by Louisiana State University Press in 2012.

Bell is also the author of Mother Country (BOA Editions in 2020), poems about fertility, motherhood, and mental illness, and founder of the Mother-Artist Salon, a virtual community dedicated to supporting mothers in their artistic practice.

Bell has received grants from the Edward F. Albee Foundation, the Jerome Foundation and the Drisha Institute and the Brooklyn Arts Councilfor her work.

Her writing has appeared in AGNI, Harvard Review, and the Massachusetts Review, among others.

Bell was an inaugural finalist for Split This Rock’s Freedom Plow Award for Poetry & Activism, an award which recognizes and honors a poet who is doing innovative and transformative work at the intersection of poetry and social change.

She has taught literature and creative writing at CUNY College of Staten Island and Brandeis University, and currently teaches poetry to the first year drama students at the Juilliard School.

Bell currently resides in the Hudson Valley with her husband, writer Jai Chakrabarti and their son.

== Awards and recognition ==
- Winner, Walt Whitman award (2011)
- Finalist, Freedom Plow Award for Poetry and Activism, 2013
