= Excimer laser-assisted nonocclusive anastomosis =

Brain surgery technique

In neurosurgery, excimer laser-assisted non-occlusive anastomosis (ELANA) is a technique used to create a bypass without interrupting the patient's blood supply. The technique reduces the risk of stroke and aneurysm rupture.

ELANA is similar to other cerebral bypass techniques, such as anastomosis. Both conventional and ELANA techniques require a donor vessel that is first attached to the artery. Once the donor vessel is attached, the artery is opened and blood flow is redirected. ELANA is differentiated from other techniques in how the artery is opened. In most conventional techniques, the flow of recipient artery is temporarily interrupted, typically via occlusion with clips, and is opened using surgical scissors or a scalpel. By contrast, ELANA uses a 308 nm excimer laser delivered through a catheter, which is inserted into the chosen blood vessel. This technique does not interrupt blood flow and thus reduces the risk that areas supplied by the targeted artery will become ischemic. This makes the technique invaluable in neurosurgery, as brain cells are particularly sensitive to ischemia. It is often used in bypasses between major cerebral arteries, both extracranial to intracranial as well as intracranial to intracranial. The technique has also been used for cardiac surgery and has been made to be sutureless in both neuro and cardiac applications.

ELANA was first developed in 1993. It has since been widely discussed in medical literature as well as the general news media.
