= Yellow Rain (poetry collection) =

2021 poetry collection by Mai Der Vang

Yellow Rain: Poems
- Author: Mai Der Vang
- Publisher: Graywolf Press
- Publication date: September 21, 2021
- Pages: 176
- Awards: Lenore Marshall Poetry Prize
- ISBN: 978-1644450659

Yellow Rain is a 2021 poetry collection by Hmong American poet Mai Der Vang. Her second book of poems, the book's title is a reference to yellow rain, a chemical that was investigated during the Cold War for its possible use in biological warfare against Hmong refugees and others. Nominated for several prizes, it won the Lenore Marshall Poetry Prize in 2022.

== Background ==
In the late seventies, during America's withdrawal from Mainland Southeast Asia, Hmong people reported a "mysterious, lethal substance" called yellow rain. In 1981, the United States government accused the Soviet Union of biological warfare, identifying yellow rain as trichothecene. Later, in 1985, a study in Scientific American argued that yellow rain was merely feces released by apis dorsata, a type of honeybee in the region. Despite an investigation between governments and scientists, as well as the United Nations, ensuing henceforth, a conclusion to the matter of yellow rain has never been institutionally declared.

Vang was born shortly after her parents resettled in the United States, becoming Hmong Americans. Her parents had been in a refugee camp when yellow rain was being reported. While in college, Vang learned about yellow rain, but it wasn't until a controversial Radiolab episode on the topic aired in September of 2012—which involved a provocative exchange against Hmong refugee Eng Yang and his niece, Kao Kalia Yang—that, in Vang's words, "yellow rain blew everything open in my life".

From then on, during her attendance of the Columbia University MFA program, Vang read articles, reports, and books on yellow rain as part of her research to "offer an extended rebuttal but also to provide another version amongst the many versions that I imagine are out there." Altogether, Vang conducted "ten years of research" which included her survey of declassified government reports and wrote the poetry collection during the last years of her research. In Electric Literature, Vang continued:

"The book is my attempt to collate into one place everything I had been thinking about that I felt was part of the answer. It’s also the stark realization that the privilege of a definitive answer and of knowing, or the privilege to inflict uncertainty on someone or a community, is a privilege that continues to elude the Hmong people. To control, withhold, and obscure truths and answers—this is the work of empire."

== Critical reception ==
The book was a finalist for the Pulitzer Prize for Poetry, making Vang the first Hmong American to be recognized by any Pulitzer Prize. It was also a finalist for the PEN/Voelcker Award for Poetry and the Los Angeles Times Book Prize for Poetry.

Gasher Press wrote: "Weaving together the strands of personal testimony, declassified U.S. government documents, and personal research, Vang reframes the narrative of yellow rain, giving crucial weight to the witness of Hmong survivors." New York Journal of Books called the book "a meticulous history lesson and a revelation, unearthing too-long ignored truths about the US government’s culpability for the brutal suffering of the Hmong people in the mountains of Laos". The Montreal International Poetry Prize, in an online review, stated: "Through striking formal organisation, contrasts between the sterility of government documents and resounding natural imagery, and a thread of hope, Vang creates a collection that demonstrates the power of poetry and narrative for retribution and testimony."
