= Leah Naomi Green =

American poet (born 1983)

- Born: June 14, 1983 (age 43); North Carolina
- Education: Earlham College; University of California, Irvine
- Occupations: Poet, essayist
- Writing career
- Notable work: The More Extravagant Feast (2020)
- Notable awards: Walt Whitman Award (2019)
- Website: Leah Naomi Green website

Leah Naomi Green (born June 14, 1983) is an American poet and creative non-fiction essayist. She is the author of The More Extravagant Feast (2020), winner of the Walt Whitman Award in 2019. She is the Writer-in-Residence at Washington and Lee University.

== Biography ==
Leah Naomi Green grew up in Greensboro, North Carolina. She graduated from Earlham College in 2005 with a BA in Environmental Studies. In 2009 she earned an MFA in Poetry Writing from the University of California, Irvine.

Green's chapbook, The Ones We Have, was published by Flying Trout Press in 2012, and was awarded the 2012 Flying Trout Chapbook prize. Green's first poetry collection, The More Extravagant Feast, will be published by Graywolf Press in 2020. The book won the 2019 Walt Whitman Award, given annually by the Academy of American Poets to an American poet who has not yet published a book. The 2019 winner was selected by poet Li-Young Lee.

She currently teaches English and Environmental Studies at Washington and Lee University where she is the Writer-in-Residence.

== Selected publications ==
=== Poetry collection ===
- The Ones We Have (2012). Flying Trout Press.
- The More Extravagant Feast (2020). Graywolf Press.

=== Essay ===
- Green, Leah Naomi (2014). "Once home, and: Venison". Ecotone. 10 (1): 143–145. doi:10.1353/ect.2014.0038. S2CID 177048057.
- "Field Guide to the Chaparral". Southern Review. 53 (2): 175–176. 2017.
- "Return, Investment, Return". Paris Review. April 13, 2020.

== Awards ==
- Flying Trout Press Award (2012), The Ones We Have, chapbook
- Katharine Bakeless Nason Award (2017)
- Walt Whitman Award (2019), The More Extravagant Feast, poetry collection
