= Linda Bierds =

American poet

- Born: Linda Louise Bierds; 1945 (age 80–81); Delaware
- Education: University of Washington
- Occupations: Poet; College professor
- Writing career
- Language: English
- Notable awards: NEA Literature Fellowship 1988; Guggenheim Fellowship 1995; MacArthur Fellowship 1998

Linda Louise Bierds (born 1945 in Delaware) is an American poet and professor of English and creative writing at the University of Washington, where she also received her B.A. in 1969.

Her books include Flights of the Harvest-Mare; The Stillness, the Dancing; Heart and Perimeter; and The Ghost Trio (1994). Since 1984, her work has appeared regularly in The New Yorker. Her poems are featured in American Alphabets: 25 Contemporary Poets (2006) and many other anthologies. She lives on Bainbridge Island.

== Awards ==
She has received fellowships from the National Endowment for the Arts in 1988, the Ingram Merrill Foundation, Artist Trust and the Guggenheim Memorial Foundation in 1995. In 1998, she was awarded a MacArthur Fellowship. She received an honorary degree in Doctor of Letters from Oglethorpe University in 2011.

== Bibliography ==
=== Collections ===
- —— (1971). Beasts: Three Short Stories. University of Washington.
- —— (1982). Snaring the Flightless Birds: The Legends of Maui. Allegany Mountain Press. ISBN 9780091588137.
- —— (1985). Off the Aleutian Chain: Poetry. L'Epervier Press. ISBN 9780934332446.
- —— (1985). Flights of the Harvest-Mare. Ahsahta Press. ISBN 9780916272272.
- —— (1988). The Stillness, the Dancing: Poems. Henry Holt. ISBN 9780805007664.
- —— (1991). Heart and Perimeter: Poems. Henry Holt. ISBN 9780805017656.
- —— (1994). The Ghost Trio: Poems. Henry Holt. ISBN 9780805034868.
- —— (1997). The Profile Makers: Poems. Henry Holt. ISBN 9780805055368.
- —— (2001). The Seconds: Poems. G.P. Putnam's Sons. ISBN 9780399147869.
- —— (2002). There. Suzzallo Library, University of Washington.
- —— (2005). First Hand: Poems. Penguin Group. ISBN 9780399152610.
- —— (2008). Flight: New and Selected Poems. Penguin.
- —— (2014). Roget's Illusion: Poems. G. P. Putnam's Sons.
- —— (2019). The Hardy Tree: Poems. Copper Canyon Press.

=== List of poems ===
Year	Title	First published	Reprinted/collected
1996	"The Weathervanes"	"The Weathervanes". The Atlantic Monthly. 278 (2): 74. August 1996.	
2005	"Meriwether and the Magpie"	"Meriwether and the Magpie". Blackbird. 4 (2). Fall 2005.	
	"Vespertilio"		Susan Aizenberg; Erin Belieu; Jeremy Countryman, eds. (2001). The Extraordinary Tide: New Poetry by American Women. New York: Columbia UP.
	"Burning the Fields"		Roger Weingarten; Richard Higgerson, eds. (2003). Poets of the New Century: An Anthology (2nd ed.). Jaffrey, NH: David R. Godine. pp. 15–17.
	"The Lacemaker's Condenser"		Roger Weingarten; Richard Higgerson, eds. (2003). Poets of the New Century: An Anthology (2nd ed.). Jaffrey, NH: David R. Godine. pp. 17–18.
	"The Suicide of Clover Adams: 1885"		Roger Weingarten; Richard Higgerson, eds. (2003). Poets of the New Century: An Anthology (2nd ed.). Jaffrey, NH: David R. Godine. pp. 18–19.
2013	"On Reflection: Michael Faraday"	"On Reflection: Michael Faraday". The Atlantic. 311 (5): 65. June 2013.	

== See also ==
- List of American poets
