= Noureddine Aba =

Algerian poet and playwright (1921–1996)

- Born: February 16, 1921; Sétif, Algeria
- Died: September 19, 1996 (aged 75); Paris, France
- Occupations: poet, playwright, journalist
- Writing career
- Period: 20th Century

Noureddine Aba (February 16, 1921 – September 19, 1996) was an Algerian poet and playwright. His work mainly focuses on political themes, such as the Algerian revolution, the Arab–Israeli conflict and Nazi Germany. In 1990, he established the Fondation Noureddine Aba, which continues to present the annual Noureddine Aba Prize to Algerian writers.

== Early life ==
Aba was born in 1921 in the Algerian town of Sétif. In his autobiographical work Le chant perdu au pays retrouve (The Lost Song of a Rediscovered Country, 1978), he described his childhood as an unhappy period, writing: "I had to envy children in some parts of the world who went through childhood with the frivolity of butterflies". After completing his secondary education in Setif, he spent one year studying law at the University of Algiers. In the 1940s, he began writing some poetry, including his 1941 collection L'Aube de l'amour (The Dawn of Love). In 1943, he was conscripted into the Algerian army, where he served for two years until the end of the Second World War.

== Writing career ==
After the war, Aba became a journalist and reported on the Nuremberg Trials. When the magazine Présence Africaine was established in 1947, Aba became one of its writers. At this point, Aba was living in France, where he spent much of his adult life.

Wartime experiences, particularly his outrage at the Sétif massacre of May 1945, also inspired Aba to commit to writing more poetry. His work is primarily focused on themes relating to politics and the impact of violence on humans, covering topics such as the Algerian revolution, the Arab–Israeli conflict and Nazi Germany. The themes of his work led the scholar Jean Déjeux to compare him to Mohammed Dib. Aba's more well-known collections include Gazelle au petit matin (Gazelle in the Early Morning, 1978) and Gazelle après minuit (Gazelle after Midnight, 1979), which take the form of a series of love poems inspired by the deaths of a young couple at the point of the country becoming independent from France.

Aba has also written many plays, which are often farces with political themes. They have been performed in French theatres and on Radio France Internationale; plays are rarely performed in Algeria unless they are in Arabic. His plays include Tell el Zaatar s'est tu a la tombée du soir (Silence at Nightfall in Tell el Zaatar, 1981), which relates episodes from the history of Palestine, and L'Annonce faite à Marco, ou a l'aube et sans couronne (The Annunciation to Marco, or Uncrowned at Dawn, 1983), which is set during the Battle of Algiers in 1957.

== Awards and honours ==
Aba's work gained greater critical recognition in the late 1970s and early 1980s. In 1979 he was presented with the Prix de l'Afrique méditerranéenne for his poetry, and in 1985 he was awarded the Fondation de France's "Prix Charles Oulmont" for his contribution to literature. His 1981 play Tell el Zaatar... won the Prix Palestine-Mahmoud Hamchari.

== Other work ==
Aba has lectured at a number of universities, including a period teaching Algerian literature at the University of Illinois at Urbana–Champaign. Aba has been a member of the Académie des sciences d'outre-mer and the Académie Universelle des Cultures. He was also part of the Haut Conseil de la francophonie, having been appointed to this by François Mitterrand.

Aba has also been active in politics. He returned briefly to Algeria in the late 1970s and worked in the Ministry of Information and Culture, before becoming disillusioned with Algerian politics and returning to France. Throughout his life, he was particularly sympathetic to Palestinian nationalism. Before his death, he petitioned the French government to persuade them to help bring an end to the Algerian Civil War.

== Death and legacy ==
Aba died in 1996 in Paris, aged 75. The Fondation Noureddine Aba, established by the author in 1990, continues to present the annual Noureddine Aba Prize to Algerian writers writing in French or Arabic. Previous recipients have included Tahar Djaout and Redha Malek.
