= Ben Doller =

American poet and writer (born 1973)

- Born: 1973 (age 52–53); Warsaw, New York
- Education: State University of New York at Oswego, West Virginia University, Iowa Writers' Workshop
- Writing career
- Genre: Poetry

Ben Doller (previously Doyle) (born 1973 Warsaw, New York) is an American poet and writer.

== Life ==
Ben Doller is the author of several books of poetry. He currently teaches at University of California, San Diego.

He graduated from the State University of New York at Oswego, and West Virginia University.

He received his MFA from the Iowa Writers' Workshop, where he was awarded a Teaching-Writing Fellowship.

Doller has taught at the Iowa Writers' Workshop, West Virginia University, Denison University, Antioch University, and in 2007, was distinguished visiting professor at Boise State University.

He was formerly a co-editor of the Kuhl House Contemporary Poetry Series at the University of Iowa Press (until 2010), and vice-editor and designer of 1913 a journal of forms, and 1913 Press.

He read at AWP 2009.

He lives in San Diego with his partner & collaborator, the poet & writer Sandra Doller (formerly Miller). In 2007, the two merged their last names: Doyle + Miller = Doller.

== Awards ==
- Recipient of the 2000 Walt Whitman Award

== Works ==
- "taxes"; "Oust Manacle"; "Same Problem", Coconut 10, October 2007
- "big deference betwixt throwing things and throwing things away"; "A POINTING HABIT"; "NICETIES"; "CHICKENSTRIPS", La Petite Zine
- "Daisy". Ploughshares. Winter 2008–09. Archived from the original on January 28, 2016.
- Added to The &NOW Awards 2: The Best Innovative Writing. &NOW Books, 2013.

=== Poetry books ===
- Radio, Radio. Louisiana State University Press. 2001. ISBN 978-0-8071-2679-0.
- FAQ. Ahsahta Press. 2009. ISBN 978-1-934103-05-0.
- Dead Ahead. Fence Books. 2010. ISBN 9781934200353
- Fauxhawk, Wesleyan University Press (2015). ISBN 9780819575869

=== Anthology ===
- Brenda Shaughnessy, ed. (2008). Satellite Convulsions: Poems from Tin House. Tin House Books. ISBN 978-0-9794198-9-8.
