= Los Angeles Times Book Prize for Poetry =

Annual literary prize

The Los Angeles Times Book Prize for Poetry, established in 1980, is a category of the Los Angeles Times Book Prize. Works are eligible during the year of their first US publication in English, though they may be written originally in languages other than English.

== Recipients ==
Los Angeles Times Book Prize for Poetry winners and finalists
Year	Author	Title	Result	Ref.
1980	Robert Kelly	Kill the Messenger	Winner	
1981	Ntozake Shange	Three Pieces	Winner	
1982	Allen Ginsberg	Plutonian Ode and Other Poems, 1977–1980	Winner	
1983	James Merrill	The Changing Light at Sandover	Winner	
1984	Charles Olson	The Maximus Poems	Winner	
1985	X.J. Kennedy	Cross Ties	Winner	
1986	Derek Walcott	Collected Poems, 1948–1984	Winner	
1987	William Meredith	Partial Accounts: New and Selected Poems	Winner	
1988	Richard Wilbur	New and Collected Poems	Winner	
1989	Donald Hall	The One Day: A Poem in Three Parts	Winner	
1990	John Caddy	The Color of Mesabi Bones	Winner	
1990	Marilyn Hacker	Going Back to the River	Finalist	
1990	Rita Dove	Grace Notes: Poems	Finalist	
1990	Gerald Stern	Leaving Another Kingdom: Selected Poems	Finalist	
1990	Eamon Grennan	What Light There Is	Finalist	
1991	Philip Levine	What Work Is	Winner	
1991	Jorie Graham	Region of Unlikeness	Finalist	
1991	Lynda Hull	Star Ledger	Finalist	
1991	George Evans	Sudden Dreams: New and Selected Poems	Finalist	
1991	Charles Wright	The World of the Ten Thousand Things: Poems 1980-1990	Finalist	
1992	Adrienne Rich	An Atlas of the Difficult World: Poems 1988-1991	Winner	
1992	Gerald Stern	Bread Without Sugar: Poems	Finalist	
1992	Susan Prospere	Sub Rosa: Poems	Finalist	
1992	Sharon Olds	The Father: Poems	Finalist	
1992	Louise Glück	The Wild Iris	Finalist	
1993	Mark Doty	My Alexandria	Winner	
1993	Christine Garren	Afterworld	Finalist	
1993	Charles Simic	Hotel Insomnia: A Novel	Finalist	
1993	Lawson Fusao Inada	Legends from Camp: Poems	Finalist	
1993	Yusef Komunyakaa	Neon Vernacular: New and Selected Poems	Finalist	
1994	Carolyn Forché	The Angel of History	Winner	
1994	Susan Wheeler	Bag O’ Diamonds: Poems	Finalist	
1994	Dan Howell	Lost Country	Finalist	
1994	Jorie Graham	Materialism: Poems	Finalist	
1994	William Everson	The Blood of the Poet: Selected Poems	Finalist	
1995	Robert Pinsky	The Inferno of Dante	Winner	
1995	Gregory Orr	City of Salt	Finalist	
1995	Gary Soto	New and Selected Poems	Finalist	
1995	Brigit Pegeen Kelly	Song: Poems	Finalist	
1995	Thomas Lux	Split Horizon: Poems	Finalist	
1996	Alan Shapiro	Mixed Company	Winner	
1996	Jorie Graham	Dream of the Unified Field: Selected Poems 1974-1994	Finalist	
1996	Louise Glück	Meadowlands	Finalist	
1996	Stanley Kunitz	Passing Through: The Later Poems, New and Selected	Finalist	
1996	Robert Pinsky	The Figured Wheel: New and Collected Poems, 1966-1996	Finalist	
1996	Lucille Clifton	The Terrible Stories: Poems	Finalist	
1996	James McMichael	The World at Large: New and Selected Poems, 1971-1996	Finalist	
1996	Rodney Jones	Things That Happen Once: New Poems	Finalist	
1996	David Rivard	Wise Poison: Poems	Finalist	
1997	Charles Wright	Black Zodiac	Winner	
1997	Carol Muske-Dukes	An Octave Above Thunder: New and Selected Poems	Finalist	
1997	Peter Sacks	Natal Command	Finalist	
1997	James Galvin	Resurrection Update: Collected Poems 1975-1997	Finalist	
1997	Tomaž Šalamun with Christopher Merrill	The Four Questions of Melancholy: New and Selected Poems	Finalist	
1998	Alice Notley	Mysteries of Small Houses	Winner	
1998	Maureen Owen	American Rush: Selected Poems	Finalist	
1998	William S. Merwin	The Folding Cliffs: A Narrative	Finalist	
1998	Jim Harrison	The Shape of the Journey: New and Collected Poems	Finalist	
1998	Donald Hall	Without: Poems	Finalist	
1999	C. K. Williams	Repair: Poems	Winner	
1999	Tom Sleigh	The Dreamhouse	Finalist	
1999	Heather McHugh	The Father of the Predicaments	Finalist	
1999	Kathleen Peirce	The Oval Hour: Poems	Finalist	
1999	David St. John	The Red Leaves of Night	Finalist	
2000	Gjertrud Schnackenberg	The Throne of Labdacus	Winner	
2000	Anne Carson	Men in the Off Hours	Finalist	
2000	Carl Phillips	Pastoral	Finalist	
2000	Nick Flynn	Some Ether: Poems	Finalist	
2000	Michael Collier	The Ledge	Finalist	
2001	Anne Carson	The Beauty of the Husband: A Fictional Essay in 29 Tangos	Winner	
2001	Alice Fulton	Felt: Poems	Finalist	
2001	James Lasdun	Landscape with Chainsaw: Poems	Finalist	
2001	Pattiann Rogers	Song of the World Becoming: Poems, New and Collected, 1981-2001	Finalist	
2001	Louise Glück	The Seven Ages	Finalist	
2002	Cynthia Zarin	The Watercourse: Poems	Winner	
2002	J.D. McClatchy	Hazmat	Finalist	
2002	Terrance Hayes	Hip Logic	Finalist	
2002	John Koethe	North Point North: New and Selected Poems	Finalist	
2002	Harryette Mullen	Sleeping With the Dictionary	Finalist	
2003	Anthony Hecht	Collected Later Poems	Winner	
2003	Rosanna Warren	Departure: Poems	Finalist	
2003	Kevin Young	Jelly Roll: A Blues	Finalist	
2003	Henri Cole	Middle Earth: Poems	Finalist	
2003	Charles Simic	The Voice at 3:00 A.M.: Selected Late and New Poems	Finalist	
2004	Richard Howard	Inner Voices: Selected Poems, 1963–2003	Winner	
2004	Catherine Tufariello	Keeping My Name	Finalist	
2004	Spencer Reece	The Clerk’s Tale: Poems	Finalist	
2004	Joshua Mehigan	The Optimist	Finalist	
2004	Brigit Pegeen Kelly	The Orchard	Finalist	
2005	Jack Gilbert	Refusing Heaven: Poems	Winner	
2005	Lucia Perillo	Luck Is Luck: Poems	Finalist	
2005	Donald Revell	Pennyweight Windows: New & Selected Poems	Finalist	
2005	Marilyn Nelson	The Cachoeira Tales and Other Poems	Finalist	
2005	Gail Mazur	Zeppo's First Wife: New and Selected Poems	Finalist	
2006	Frederick Seidel	Ooga-Booga	Winner	
2006	Erin Belieu	Black Box	Finalist	
2006	Thom Satterlee	Burning Wyclif: Poems	Finalist	
2006	Michael Waters	Darling Vulgarity: Poems	Finalist	
2006	Adrian C. Louis	Logorrhea: Poems	Finalist	
2007	Stanley Plumly	Old Heart: Poems	Winner	
2007	Jean Valentine	Little Boat	Finalist	
2007	Marvin Bell	Mars Being Red	Finalist	
2007	Elaine Equi	Ripple Effect: New and Selected Poems	Finalist	
2007	Albert Goldbarth	The Kitchen Sink: New and Selected Poems, 1972-2007	Finalist	
2008	Frank Bidart	Watching the Spring Festival: Poems	Winner	
2008	Cole Swensen	Ours	Finalist	
2008	Connie Voisine	Rare High Meadow of Which I Might Dream	Finalist	
2008	Jorie Graham	Sea Change: Poems	Finalist	
2008	Marie Howe	The Kingdom of Ordinary Time: Poems	Finalist	
2009	Brenda Hillman	Practical Water	Winner	
2009	Lyrae Van Clief-Stefanon	]Open Interval[	Finalist	
2009	Gabrielle Calvocoressi	Apocalyptic Swing: Poems	Finalist	
2009	Amy Gerstler	Dearest Creature	Finalist	
2009	Tom Healy	What the Right Hand Knows	Finalist	
2010	Maxine Kumin	Where I Live: New & Selected Poems 1990–2010	Winner	
2010	Craig Santos Perez	From Unincorporated Territory: Saina	Finalist	
2010	Yehoshua November	God’s Optimism	Finalist	
2010	Henri Cole	Pierce the Skin: Selected Poems	Finalist	
2010	Ed Roberson	To See the Earth Before the End of the World	Finalist	
2011	Carl Phillips	Double Shadow: Poems	Winner	
2011	Bruce Smith	Devotions	Finalist	
2011	Dawn Lundy Martin	Discipline	Finalist	
2011	Jim Harrison	Songs of Unreason	Finalist	
2011	Linda Norton	The Public Gardens: Poems and History	Finalist	
2012	Louise Glück	Poems 1962–2012	Winner	
2012	Bin Ramke	Aerial	Finalist	
2012	Cole Swensen	Gravesend	Finalist	
2012	Rowan Ricardo Phillips	The Ground: Poems	Finalist	
2012	D. A. Powell	Useless Landscape: or A Guide for Boys: Poems	Finalist	
2013	Ron Padgett	Collected Poems	Winner	
2013	Lynn Xu	Debts & Lessons	Finalist	
2013	Mei-mei Berssenbrugge	Hello, the Roses	Finalist	
2013	Elizabeth Robinson	On Ghosts	Finalist	
2013	Joshua Beckman	The Inside of an Apple	Finalist	
2014	Claudia Rankine	Citizen: An American Lyric	Winner	
2014	Katie Ford	Blood Lyrics: Poem	Finalist	
2014	Peter Gizzi	In Defense of Nothing: Selected Poems, 1987-2011	Finalist	
2014	Gillian Conoley	Peace	Finalist	
2014	Fred Moten	The Feel Trio	Finalist	
2015	Jorie Graham	From the New World: Poems 1976–2014	Winner	
2015	Rick Barot	Chord	Finalist	
2015	Jean Valentine	Shirt in Heaven	Finalist	
2015	Fiona Sze-Lorrain	The Ruined Elegance	Finalist	
2015	Robin Coste Lewis	Voyage of the Sable Venus	Finalist	
2016	Rosmarie Waldrop	Gap Gardening: Selected Poems	Winner	
2016	Robyn Schiff	A Woman of Property	Finalist	
2016	Ishion Hutchinson	House of Lords and Commons: Poems	Finalist	
2016	Phillis Levin	Mr. Memory & Other Poems	Finalist	
2016	Jane Mead	World of Made and Unmade	Finalist	
2017	Patricia Smith	Incendiary Art: Poems	Winner	
2017	Alessandra Lynch	Daylily Called it A Dangerous Moment	Finalist	
2017	David Wojahn	For the Scribe	Finalist	
2017	Shane McCrae	In the Language of my Captor	Finalist	
2017	Evie Shockley	semiautomatic	Finalist	
2018	Carl Phillips	Wild is the Wind: Poems	Winner	
2018	Jos Charles	Feeld	Finalist	
2018	Terrance Hayes	American Sonnets for My Past and Future Assassin	Finalist	
2018	Diana Khoi Nguyen	Ghost Of	Finalist	
2018	Diane Seuss	Still Life with Two Dead Peacocks and a Girl	Finalist	
2019	Ilya Kaminsky	Deaf Republic: Poems	Winner	
2019	Reginald Dwayne Betts	Felon	Finalist	
2019	Sally Wen Mao	Oculus	Finalist	
2019	Mary Ruefle	Dunce	Finalist	
2019	Carmen Gimenez Smith	Be Recorder	Finalist	
2020	Victoria Chang	Obit	Winner	
2020	Anthony Cody	Borderland Apocrypha	Finalist	
2020	Nikky Finney	Love Child’s Hotbed of Occasional Poetry: Poems and Artifacts	Finalist	
2020	Natalie Diaz	Postcolonial Love Poem	Finalist	
2020	Honorée Fanonne Jeffers	The Age of Phillis	Finalist	
2021	Diane Seuss	frank: sonnets	Winner	
2021	CM Burroughs	Master Suffering	Finalist	
2021	Rita Dove	Playlist for the Apocalypse: Poems	Finalist	
2021	Martín Espada	Floaters: Poems	Finalist	
2021	Mai Der Vang	Yellow Rain: Poems	Finalist	
2022	Dionne Brand	Nomenclature: New and Collected Poems	Winner	
2022	James Cagney	Martian: The Saint of Loneliness	Finalist	
2022	Marwa Helal	Ante Body	Finalist	
2022	Cynthia Parker-Ohene	Daughters of Harriet: Poems	Finalist	
2022	Solmaz Sharif	Customs: Poems	Finalist	
2023	Airea D. Matthews	Bread and Circus: Poems	Winner	
2023	K. Iver	Short Film Starring My Beloved’s Red Bronco	Finalist	
2023	Maggie Millner	Couplets: A Love Story	Finalist	
2023	Jenny Molberg	The Court of No Record: Poems	Finalist	
2023	Simon Shieh	Master: Poems	Finalist	
