= 2024 in poetry =

This article covers 2024 in poetry.

== Events ==
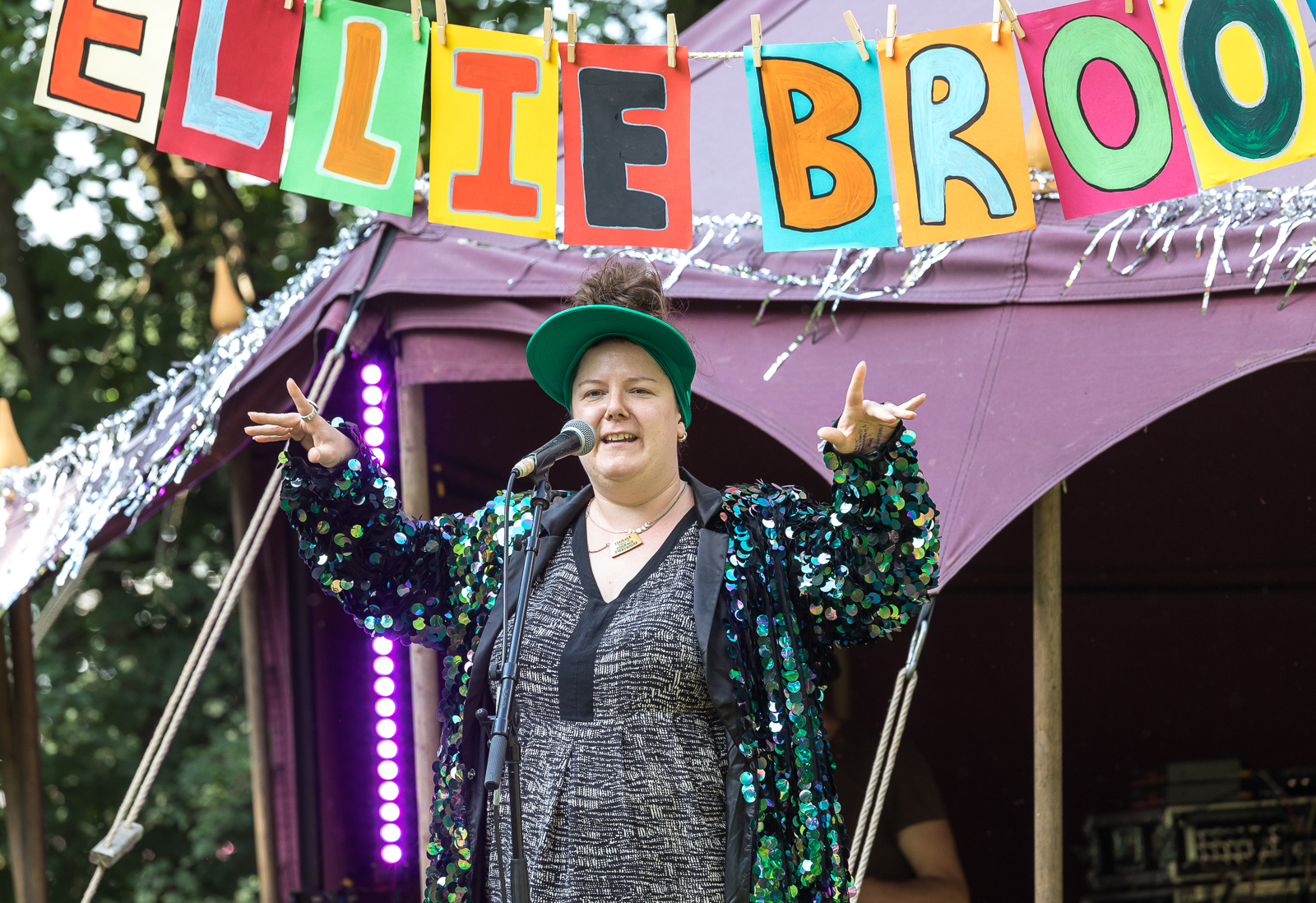
Ellie Brooks reading poetry on 28 July 2024

- March 21 – World Poetry Day events
  - in Edinburgh, Scotland (at Craigmillar Library, Stockbridge Library, and Napier University)
  - in Granada, Spain
- June 6–16 – The 2024 Genoa International Poetry Festival took place in Genoa, Italy.
- September 23–29 – The Tell It Slant Poetry Festival took place at the Emily Dickinson Museum in Amherst, Massachusetts, U.S.
- November 14–17 – The Ars Poetica festival took place in Bratislava, Slovakia; poems read there were also anthologized.

== Selection of works published in English ==
=== United Kingdom ===
- Rachael Allen, God Complex
- Isabel Galleymore, Baby Schema
- Alistair McGowan, Not What We Were Expecting
- Rachel Mann, Eleanor Among the Saints

=== United States ===
- Victoria Chang, With My Back to the World
- Pedro Iniguez, Mexicans on the Moon

=== Other in English ===
- Victoria Kennefick, Egg/Shell, Irish poet published in England

== Works published in other languages ==
=== Ukrainian language ===
- Karol Gwóźdź, Приховані думки / Myśli ukryte, translated from the original Silesian language into Ukrainian; publisher: Wydawnictwa Uniwersytetu Warszawskiego, ISBN 978-83-235-6299-3

== Awards ==
Forward Prize

- Victoria Chang for With My Back to the World (Best Collection)
- Marjorie Lotfi for The Wrong Person to Ask (Best First Collection)
- Cindy Juyoung Ok for "Ward of One" (Best Single Poem)
- Leyla Josephine for 'Dear John Berger' (Best Single Poem, performed).

Rhysling Award

- Lauren Scharhag for "Little Brown Changeling" (Long form)
- Geoffrey A. Landis for "No One Now Remembers" (Short form)

Dwarf Stars Award

- Xiao Xi, translated by Yilin Wang for 关于树的无数可能”/ “the infinite possibilities of trees.”

Elgin Awards

- Christina Sng, for The Gravity of Existence (book)
- Amelia Gorman for Worm Sonnets (chapbook).

== Deaths ==
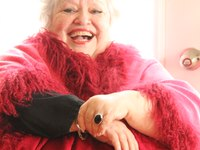
Margot Lemire in 2017

- January 4 – Fred Chappell, American author and poet
- January 5 – Jorge Aguilar Mora, Mexican poet and critic
- January 5 – Catrìona NicGumaraid, Scottish poet
- February 4 – N. K. Desam, Indian poet
- February 5 – Jimi Solanke, Nigerian actor, poet, and playwright
- March 10 – Alta, American feminist
- March 10 – Margot Lemire, Canadian poet and dramatist
- July 21 - Deborah P Kolodji, American haiku poet.
- October 10 – Fleur Adcock, New Zealand poet
- November 11 - Bruce Boston,American speculative fiction writer and poet.

== See also ==
- Poetry
- List of years in poetry
- List of poetry awards
