= Wesley Strick =

American screenwriter (born 1954)

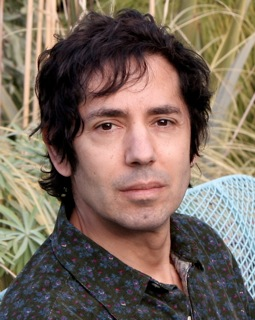
- Strick in 2008
- Born: February 11, 1954 (age 72); New York City, New York, U.S.
- Education: Vassar College; University of California, Berkeley
- Occupations: Screenwriter, film director, producer

Wesley Strick (born February 11, 1954) is an American screenwriter, director, and producer of film and television. He has written films such as True Believer (1989), Arachnophobia (1990), Cape Fear (1991), Wolf (1994), The Saint (1997), and Doom (2005). He is also known for his contributions to the series The Man in the High Castle.

== Early life and education ==
Strick was born in New York City, New York, the son of Racelle (née Kessler) and Louis Strick. He is Jewish. He is a graduate of Vassar College and University of California, Berkeley, where he studied creative writing with the poet Thom Gunn.

== Career ==
Prior to his Hollywood career, he worked as a rock journalist in New York City, contributing features and reviews to Circus, Creem and Rolling Stone.

As a "script doctor" he has done production polishes on such films as Batman Returns, Face/Off and Mission: Impossible 2. Strick's screenplay for True Believer was nominated for a 1990 Edgar Award for Best Mystery Motion Picture. Strick won a 1994 Saturn Award (with co-writer Jim Harrison) for his screenplay for the Mike Nichols film Wolf.

Since 1995, Strick has served as a creative advisor at the Sundance Institute's Screenwriters Lab. Strick wrote the original script for Tim Burton's unproduced Superman Lives, later re-written by Dan Gilroy as a more budget conscious take on Strick's story. His first novel, Out There in the Dark, was published by St. Martin's Press in February 2006. His second novel, Whirlybird, is available as a Kindle book on Amazon.com. In 2008, Strick co-wrote the screenplay for a remake of A Nightmare on Elm Street, starring Jackie Earle Haley and Rooney Mara, directed by Samuel Bayer. The film won the People's Choice Award for Favorite Horror Movie of 2010.

Strick's adaptation of the Belgian thriller Loft, starring James Marsden and Karl Urban, was released by Open Road in January 2015. In summer 2013, Strick wrote and directed a short film, Watching, Waiting, which screened at numerous 2014 film festivals, including Women and Minorities in Media, Black Maria, Sedona and Williamstown. In fall 2015, Strick relocated to London to write on Season 2 of the Amazon drama series (based on the Philip K. Dick novel) The Man in the High Castle. He returned to Los Angeles in 2016 to resume as a writer/co-executive producer on Season 3 (Strick wrote the season opener, mid-season finale and final episode). In early 2018, Strick began work on Season 4.

== Filmography ==
=== Film ===
Year	Title	Functioned as			Director	Notes
Year	Title	Writer	Director	Producer	Director	Notes
1989	True Believer	Yes	No	No	Joseph Ruben	
1990	Arachnophobia	Yes	No	No	Frank Marshall	Co-written with Don Jakoby
1991	Cape Fear	Yes	No	No	Martin Scorsese	
1992	Final Analysis	Yes	No	No	Phil Joanou	
1994	Wolf	Yes	No	No	Mike Nichols	Co-written with Jim Harrison
1995	The Tie That Binds	No	Yes	No	Himself	
1997	The Saint	Yes	No	No	Phillip Noyce	Co-written with Jonathan Hensleigh
1998	Return to Paradise	Yes	No	No	Joseph Ruben	Co-written with Bruce Robinson
2001	The Glass House	Yes	No	No	Daniel Sackheim	
2005	Doom	Yes	No	No	Andrzej Bartkowiak	Co-written with David Callaham
2006	Love Is the Drug	Yes	No	Executive	Elliott Lester	Co-written with Steven Allison
2010	A Nightmare on Elm Street	Yes	No	No	Samuel Bayer	Co-written with Eric Heisserer
2014	The Loft	Yes	No	Executive	Erik Van Looy	

==== Uncredited script revisions ====
- Batman Returns (1992)
- Terminal Velocity (1994)
- Face/Off (1997)
- Mission: Impossible 2 (2000)

=== Television ===
Year	Title	Functioned as				Notes
Year	Title	Creator	Director	Writer	Executive Producer	Notes
1991	Eddie Dodd	Yes	No	Yes	No	
2001	Hitched	No	Yes	Yes	No	TV movie
2016–19	The Man in the High Castle	No	No	Yes	Yes	Writer; 7 episodes Producer; 30 episodes
2020	Monsterland	No	No	Yes	No	Writer; 1 episode
2023	Carnival Row	No	No	Yes	Yes	Writer; 1 episode Producer; 10 episodes
