= Serenity Media Group =

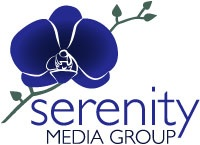
- Industry: Motion pictures
- Founded: 2010
- Headquarters: Los Angeles, CA, United States
- Key people: Christie Hsiao, CEO
- Products: film, TV, digital media

Serenity Media Group is a film production company founded in 2010 by Christie Hsiao.

In April 2012, Serenity Media announced the creation of a $150 million film fund in partnership with both American and Chinese investors. As part of the deal, Serenity Media and China Lion will co-produce at least two feature-length films per year. As of 2012 the company has four independently produced untitled films in development, including "Without a Badge", in cooperation with Permut Presentations.

Before launching Serenity Media, Hsiao had previously served as executive producer on Alpine Film's "The Gold Retrievers" and Love Is the Drug.
