= Master (poetry collection) =

2023 debut poetry collection by Simon Shieh

- Author: Simon Shieh
- Publisher: Sarabande Books
- Publication date: September 12, 2023
- Pages: 90
- Awards: Kathryn A. Morton Prize; Norma Farber First Book Award
- ISBN: 978-1956046212

Master is a 2023 debut poetry collection by Taiwanese American poet Simon Shieh, published by Sarabande Books. It has been selected by Terrance Hayes for the Sarabande Books Kathryn A. Morton Prize in 2022. Accordingly, Hayes wrote an introduction for its publication. It won the Norma Farber First Book Award and was a finalist for the Los Angeles Times Book Prize for Poetry.

== Contents ==
Drawing from Shieh's own experiences as a martial artist growing up, the book follows a speaker who attends a martial arts school in upstate New York and later a boxing academy in Beijing. Through the book's poems, the speaker explicates childhood trauma from the violence inflicted by the "master" and charts his path toward healing and liberation.

== Background ==
In Poets & Writers Magazine, Shieh shared that he began writing the book when he was 24 and returning to Beijing where he taught English. Specifically, he wrote the poem "Self-Defense" first and knew that the rest of the book would emerge from it. Shieh then stated that Beijing was the city where, at 15, Shieh found safety away from the book's "master" character, often referred to as "he" in Shieh's poems.

Shieh named "Eduardo C. Corral, Jenny Xie, J. Michael Martinez, Richard Siken, Mai Der Vang, Taylor Johnson, Natalie Diaz, Sally Wen Mao, Thomas James, Ocean Vuong, Ilya Kaminsky, Sylvia Plath, and Jenny George" as his inspirations for how to write a first book. He also mentioned Derek Walcott, James Wright, Jericho Brown, Lucie Brock-Broido, Carl Phillips, Louise Glück, Julia Kristeva, Jacques Lacan, and Jean Valentine, as well as Hayes and the poets from the Tang dynasty.

== Critical reception ==
For the book's introduction, Hayes wrote that "This book feels like one of a kind" with poems that "can feel sensual and are poetic" as well as poems that "feel solitary and deliberate" which "reckon with the inexpressible."

Publishers Weekly gave the book a starred review, calling it a "phenomenal debut" that showed "how writing may serve as both a refuge and a form of resistance, acknowledging the power of language to transform and heal." LitHub called it "astonishing" and observed its approach to trauma. Poets & Writers Magazine said Shieh "presents a poetics of emancipation, grappling with and deconstructing the memory of a master figure’s misused power."
