= Barbie Chang =

2017 poetry collection by Victoria Chang

- Author: Victoria Chang
- Genre: Poetry
- Publisher: Copper Canyon Press
- Publication date: November 14, 2017
- Pages: 96
- Awards: Housatonic Book Award for Poetry
- ISBN: 978-1556595165
- Preceded by: The Boss
- Followed by: OBIT

Barbie Chang is a 2017 poetry collection by American poet Victoria Chang, published by Copper Canyon Press. Centered around an Asian American imagining of Barbie, its included poems span topics of racism, gender politics, love, and the American Dream. It won the Housatonic Book Award for Poetry in 2018.

== Content ==
Some of the poems appeared in literary magazines. "Barbie Chang's Tears" appeared in Poetry alongside a guest feature written by Chang. "These Men Can Be Collected" appeared on the Poetry Society of America website with an essay from Chang. "Once Barbie Chang Worked" appeared on Poets.org.

== Critical reception ==
Publishers Weekly, calling the book a "provocative and finely crafted volume", was mixed on some of the poems' "heavy-handedness" but stated "Chang is emerging as an exciting voice in contemporary poetry, and this is undoubtedly her most accomplished volume to date."

Poets.org appreciated the book's nuance, attention, and humor. The Los Angeles Review observed the collection's approach to racial and gender identity, stating it "speaks for those who have struggled with not meeting expectations or standards and have felt on the outside looking in." The Rumpus called it "an intelligent, lively portrayal of the pressures on contemporary women (especially mothers), and a breathlessly entertaining read." The Cincinnati Review lauded Chang's ambition and said "There’s much to love about the poems in Barbie Chang—their music, their figurative precision, their heart".
