= Revenge (1990 film) =

1990 film by Tony Scott

- Theatrical release poster
- Directed by: Tony Scott
- Written by: Jim Harrison; Jeffrey Alan Fiskin
- Based on: Revenge by Jim Harrison
- Produced by: Stanley Rubin; Hunt Lowry
- Starring: Kevin Costner; Anthony Quinn; Madeleine Stowe; Sally Kirkland
- Cinematography: Jeffrey L. Kimball
- Edited by: Chris Lebenzon; Michael Tronick
- Music by: Jack Nitzsche
- Production company: Rastar
- Distributed by: Columbia Pictures (Select territories); New World Pictures (International)
- Release date: February 16, 1990
- Running time: 124 minutes
- Country: United States
- Language: English
- Budget: $22 million
- Box office: $26.6 million

Revenge is a 1990 American romantic crime drama film directed by Tony Scott and written by Jim Harrison and Jeffrey Alan Fiskin, who based the screenplay on the Harrison's own 1979 novella published in Esquire. The neo-noir and neo-Western film stars Kevin Costner, Anthony Quinn, Madeleine Stowe, Miguel Ferrer and Sally Kirkland, and John Leguizamo in one of his earliest roles.

The film follows recently retired U.S. naval aviator Jay Cochran (Costner) who visits his friend Tibey Mendez (Quinn), a Mexican crime boss, and falls in love with his much younger wife Miryea (Stowe), leading to an affair that sparks a chain reaction of violence and death.

Shot on location in Mexico, the film is a production of New World Pictures and Rastar Films and was released by Columbia Pictures. Despite poor critical reception and box office performance, the film received a cult following since its release especially for its dark theme and Scott's direction.

== Plot ==
Michael J. "Jay" Cochran is a U.S. Navy aviator, leaving the service after 12 years. He receives a matched pair of Beretta shotguns and an invitation from his wealthy friend, Tiburon "Tibey" Mendez to spend time at his hacienda in Mexico. Tibey is also a powerful crime boss, constantly surrounded by bodyguards.

In Mexico, Cochran meets Tibey's beautiful young wife, Miryea, who lives in lavish surroundings, but is unhappy because her much older husband does not want to have any children, feeling pregnancy would spoil her looks.

Right from his late arrival, Cochran rubs Tibey's suspicious right-hand man, Cesar, the wrong way by behaving independently and not acting like an employee. After enjoying a friendly reunion with Tibey, Cochran presents Tibey with a Navy G-1 leather flight jacket, confirming their very close friendship.

After an awkward dinner with Tibey, Cochran, Miryea, and two of Cesar's rude and crude associates, Tibey conducts a private meeting with the latter duo asserting his strict standards and cruel discipline, especially when it comes to family and friends, killing one of them.

Later, Miryea and Cochran get better acquainted and develop a romantic attraction towards one another.

During a party and with Tibey and his men nearby, Cochran and Miryea have sex. Cochran tells Miryea he intends to leave Mexico, worried that Tibey will become aware of the situation. Miryea begs Cochran to stay, and, having fallen in love with her, he agrees; they then arrange a secret rendezvous at his cabin in Mexico.

Miryea tells Tibey that she will be visiting her sister in Miami, but Tibey overhears a telephone conversation in which Miryea asks her sister to lie for her. Tibey drives Miryea to the airport, giving her one last kiss. Cochran is secretly waiting inside the airport, and they drive off to his cabin.

At their hideaway, they are ambushed by Tibey and his men. Cochran's beloved dog, Rocky, is shot dead. Tibey slashes Miryea across her face with a switchblade, creating a deep scar, as his henchmen viciously beat Cochran into unconsciousness. After setting fire to the cabin, they dump Cochran in the desert, leaving him to die.

Tibey takes Miryea to a brothel to be a sex slave. The madame initially rejects her due to her now-disfigured face but agrees to relegate Miryea to "common use". Miryea is then raped by one of Tibey's men who is vengeful because she could never remember his name. A young man is assigned to drug and addict her but uses unsterilized needles and, as Miryea no longer wishes to live, she persuades him to share a needle with her, therefore infecting Miryea with AIDS.

A critically wounded Cochran is discovered by Mauro, a peasant farmer whose family slowly nurses Cochran back to health. He returns to the burnt cabin and retrieves some money he had hidden. Mauro drives Cochran to town and gives him a knife to "cut the balls off your enemy". Cochran encounters a Texan transporting a horse who offers Cochran a ride to Durango. Inside a cantina, Cochran notices one of the thugs who had thrashed him; he follows him into the men's room and cuts his throat.

After a day on the road, the Texan delivers the horse to a wealthy man who recognizes Cochran from an afternoon at Tibey's estate. The friendly Texan later dies peacefully in his car while Cochran is driving.

At a motel, Cochran encounters Mauro's brother-in-law, Amador. Amador and his quiet friend, Ignacio, are willing to help Cochran seek revenge because Amador's sister was killed after getting mixed up in business that involved Tibey. They capture another of Tibey's henchmen, who tells them where Miryea can be found. Cochran barges into the brothel, only to find that Miryea has been moved.

Cochran, Amador, and Ignacio ambush Tibey and his bodyguard during Tibey's morning horseback ride. Cochran asks Miryea's whereabouts, but first, Tibey requests that Cochran ask forgiveness for having stolen his wife. When Cochran lowers his gun and asks Tibey's forgiveness, Tibey reveals that Miryea is in a convent.

Miryea is in a convent hospice, dying of AIDS, when Cochran arrives to tell Miryea that he loves her. He then carries her outside, and Miryea tells Cochran that she also loves him, before she dies in his arms, much to Cochran's despair. He mourns the death of the woman that he loves.

== Cast ==
- Kevin Costner as Michael J. "Jay" Cochran, a retired U.S. Navy aviator, Tibey's ex-friend and Miryea's lover.
- Anthony Quinn as Tibey Mendez, a businessman, crime lord, Jay's ex-friend and Miryea's husband.
- Madeleine Stowe as Miryea Mendez, Tibey's wife and Jay's lover.
- Miguel Ferrer as Amador
- Tomas Milian as Cesar
- James Gammon as the Texan
- Joaquín Martínez as Mauro
- Jesse Corti as Madero
- John Leguizamo as Ignacio
- Joe Santos as Porfilio Ibarra
- Christofer de Oni as Cisco Diaz
- Karmin Murcelo as Madam
- Sally Kirkland as Rock Star
- Kathleen Hughes as Mother Superior

== Production ==
=== Development ===
The novella was published in 1979 along with two other novellas under the title Legends of the Fall. Esquire magazine published the novella Legends of the Fall in January 1979 and public response was so enthusiastic that Revenge was published in May. Warner Bros promptly bought the screen rights and hired Harrison to do the screenplay.

The project languished in development hell for eleven years. John Huston was to direct Jack Nicholson and then Orson Welles was attached to direct. Harrison later recalled he "wrote about 12 different endings to it". Walter Hill worked on the screenplay for a while.

Costner had an interest in the novella from the mid-1980s. "It seemed to me something I wanted to do myself", he said. "I contemplated directing it because it seemed like a small movie. The story was manageable, but the themes were big and universal, and the writing was tough and it was honest and it was original. There was poignance in the story, and it read like an original movie to me."

Producer Ray Stark eventually acquired the rights from Warner Bros in exchange for the film Bird. Costner used his celebrity status to help get the film made.

Costner would serve as executive producer and take a special interest in the script. The writer was Robert Garland who made No Way Out with Costner.

For a time it seemed John Huston might direct Costner in the film and the two men met; Huston was not impressed by the actor. In 1987, New World Pictures teamed up with Rastar to co-own feature film rights to the Revenge project.

=== Shooting ===
Principal shooting took place in several Mexican cities, including Puerto Vallarta and Mexico City. Production completed on December 14, 1988. Some shooting took place in Sierra de Órganos National Park in the town of Sombrerete, Mexico. The closing scene was shot at the Iglesia de Nuestra Señora de los Remedios, one of several monasteries near the volcano Popocatapetl. Director Tony Scott would lend several assets from his prior making of Top Gun, including access to the Navy personnel to arrange footage of F-14s over rough desert terrain. Viewers would also recognize the familiar cockpit simulators in Revenge's opening sequence as those used in Top Gun.

== Release ==
Columbia released Revenge on VHS and Betamax in August 1990. The version included on the 2007 DVD and Blu-ray releases is Tony Scott's director's cut, shorter by 20 minutes, running 104 minutes, and including expanded scenes as well as some deletions and additional scoring by Harry Gregson-Williams.

== Reception ==
On the review aggregator website Rotten Tomatoes, 30% of 20 critics' reviews are positive. Metacritic, which uses a weighted average, assigned the film a score of 35 out of 100, based on 23 critics, indicating "generally unfavorable" reviews. Audiences surveyed by CinemaScore gave the film a grade B− on scale of A to F.

Variety wrote, "This far-from-perfect rendering of Jim Harrison's shimmering novella has a romantic sweep and elemental power that ultimately transcend its flaws." Owen Gleiberman of Entertainment Weekly rated it D and called it a vanity project for Costner. Roger Ebert, writing for the Chicago Sun-Times, rated it 2.5 out of 4 stars and wrote that the film "plays like a showdown between its style and its story." Vincent Canby of The New York Times described it as "soft and aimless ... the performances are without conviction." Hal Hinson of The Washington Post wrote that the story becomes so cynical that nothing has meaning.

"They pretty much shot the novella", said Harrison. "I was so swept away by it that I cried – I really did. And I'm not known for crying". In retrospect, writer Jeffrey Alan Fiskin said: "There are parts of it that I really liked."

About the movie’s legacy, Tony Scott said: “I think it became kind of a cult film because it was a forbidden-love story. It took people down a different road than what the genre had done in the past.“

The film grossed $15,535,771 in the United States and Canada and $26.6 million worldwide.
