= John Patrick Amedori =

American actor and musician

- Occupations: Actor, musician
- Years active: 1998–present
- Spouse: Annika Noelle (m. Oct. 5, 2025)

John Patrick Amedori is an American actor and musician. He is known for playing Gabe Mitchell in Dear White People.

Amedori appeared in the film The Vatican Tapes (2015). He has also appeared in a number of television shows, including Law & Order, Nip/Tuck, Joan of Arcadia and Ghost Whisperer, as well as a part in the films The Butterfly Effect and Stick It. In 2006, Amedori starred in Fox's drama series Vanished, and in 2008 was cast as Aaron Rose in Gossip Girl as a love interest of Serena van der Woodsen and the stepbrother of Blair Waldorf.

== Career ==
In 2004, Amedori appeared as a young Evan in The Butterfly Effect. In 2006 he earned starring roles in the television show Vanished, as well as the films Stick It and Love is the Drug.

In 2008, he was cast as Aaron Rose, a love interest of Serena van der Woodsen in Gossip Girl. In 2010, he appeared in Scott Pilgrim vs. the World. In 2012, he was cast in Billy Bob Thornton's Jayne Mansfield's Car.

In 2015, he earned a reoccurring role on the television show Hindsight and starred in the film The Vatican Tapes. In 2016, appeared in multiple episodes of Aquarius

Since 2017, he has starred as Gabe Mitchell in the Netflix series Dear White People. He appeared in multiple episodes of The Good Doctor as "Dash".

== Filmography ==
Film
Year	Title	Role	Notes
1998	D Minus	Lead	
2000	Unbreakable	Hostage boy	
2002	Incest	Manni	Short film
2004	The Butterfly Effect	Evan Treborn at age 13	
2005	The Good Humor Man	Corner store clerk	
2005	Little Athens	Jimmy	
2005	Mrs. Harris	Young David Harris	Television film
2006	Stick It	Poot	
2006	Love Is the Drug	Jonah Brand	
	Kara's File	John	Short film
2009	TiMER	Mikey Evers	
2010	Scott Pilgrim vs. the World	Lollipop hipster	
2011	The Family Tree	Paul Stukey	
2012	Electrick Children	Johnny	
2012	Jayne Mansfield's Car	Mickey Caldwell	
2012	Trattoria	Vince	
2013	The Last Stand	Agent Aaron Mitchell	
2013	Rays of Light	Raymond Beaty Jr.	
2014	Beautiful Now	Chris	
2015	The Vatican Tapes	Pete	
2018	After Darkness	Raymond Beaty Jr.	
2019	Sock & Buskin	Paul Buschini	
2024	Detained	Robert Audrey	

Television
Year	Title	Role	Notes
2001	Law & Order	Zack	Episode: "Deep Vote"
2001	Philly	Neil Toland	2 episodes
2002	The Guardian	Justin Damira	Episode: "The Divide"
2002	State of Grace	Neil Sullivan	Episode: "Where the Boys Are"
2003	Still Standing	Jason	Episode: "Still Negotiating"
2004	Joan of Arcadia	Loner Loser Kid God	Episode: "Back to the Garden"
2005	Rocky Point	Eli	Episode: "Pilot"
2005	House	Matt Davis	Episode: "Poison"
2005	Ghost Whisperer	Jason Shields	Episode: "Homecoming"
2005	Nip/Tuck	Max Pollack	Episode: "Tommy Bolton"
2005	Law & Order: Special Victims Unit	Wayne Mortens	Episode: "Rockabye"
2006	Vanished	Max Collins	Main role
2007	Numb3rs	Lee Brady	Episode: "Nine Wives"
2007	CSI: NY	T.J. Lindmark	Episode: "Cold Reveal"
2008	The Cleaner	Brian Porter	Episode: "House of Pain"
2008	Gossip Girl	Aaron Rose	6 episodes
2009	CSI: Miami	Kevin Hensler	Episode: "Count Me Out"
2010	Law & Order: LA	K.K. Curren	Episode: "Hollywood"
2013	Criminal Minds	Bryan Hughes	Episode: "Magnum Opus"
2015	Hindsight	Jamie Brady	Main role
2016	Aquarius	Leonard	2 episodes
2017–2021	Dear White People	Gabe	Main role
2018, 2020	The Good Doctor	Dash	3 episodes
2024	Three Women	Jack	Main role
