= Nightingale (film) =

- Television release poster
- Directed by: Elliott Lester
- Written by: Frederick Mensch
- Produced by: Brad Pitt; Lucas Akoskin; Elliott Lester; Josh Weinstock; Katrina Wolfe
- Starring: David Oyelowo
- Cinematography: Pieter Vermeer
- Edited by: Nicholas Wayman-Harris
- Music by: Mark D. Todd
- Production companies: Sea Smoke Entertainment; BN Films; Plan B Entertainment; Yoruba Saxon Productions
- Distributed by: HBO Films
- Release dates: June 17, 2014 (Los Angeles Film Festival); May 29, 2015 (United States)
- Running time: 83 minutes
- Country: United States
- Language: English

Nightingale is a 2014 American drama film directed by Elliott Lester and written by Frederick Mensch. The film stars David Oyelowo and was premiered on HBO on May 29, 2015.

== Plot ==
The movie follows the life of Peter Snowden, a man in his late 30s who starts the story by confessing to murdering his mother. He expresses his lack of guilt over the crime but regrets the amount of blood involved. Peter, a vlogger of sorts, decides not to upload the confession video. The next day, he goes about his daily routine, momentarily forgetting the murder as he calls out to his mother's closed bedroom door. Peter appears stuck in a different time period, singing old songs and wearing outdated clothes.

Peter tries to reach out to his old military buddy, Edward, repeatedly leaving messages but getting no response. He also receives a makeup mirror his mother ordered before her death, which becomes a symbol of her presence throughout the film. Peter lies to his sister Vickie about their mother's whereabouts and vents his frustration through phone calls to Edward's answering machine.

The smell of decomposition from his mother's room becomes unbearable, and Peter temporarily seals the door with a towel. He buys an iPhone and a Bluetooth headset and discovers his mother's blood-stained glasses while searching for his own pair. Peter finally manages to reach Edward and invites him to dinner, claiming his mother has "moved away." Miraculously, Edward is free on Friday, the day Peter set to his viewers Excited about the upcoming dinner, Peter prepares the house and eventually removes his mother's body, reflecting her fear of him through a locked bedroom door.

Peter deceives Vickie about their mother's situation and discusses his plans to redecorate the house, charging the expenses to his credit card. He interacts with various people who inquire about his mother, providing them with different stories. Peter reveals his tropical fish, Adam and Eve, to his online viewers, showcasing his anticipation for Edward's arrival.

As Peter searches for his espresso machine, he becomes increasingly frustrated and eventually finds it hidden in the attic. He shares stories about his military past and a misunderstanding with Edward that needs resolution. Peter tries to convince Vickie to send him money for a trip, suggesting they send their mother to visit a friend in Mobile, AL. He receives calls from concerned acquaintances, lies to them, and faces mounting pressure.

The much-anticipated day of Edward's visit arrives, but Peter grows anxious as he waits for his guest, who is delayed. He calls Edward and speaks to his wife Gloria, pretending to be someone else, but Gloria makes it clear that she both knows who Peter is and does not want him to keep harassing her husband. Frustrated, Peter loses control, damaging the dining room and revealing his violent tendencies. Feeling devastated, he plans to run away with Edward but receives news that shatters his hopes.

Peter contemplates suicide and prepares a letter to Edward, but upon discovering unopened letters he wrote in the past, he decides against it. He consumes a large amount of medication but vomits and fails to end his life by inhaling exhaust fumes. The next day, he believes someone tries to break into his house, but there's no evidence of anyone there. Peter eats breakfast, closes the mirror, and shares the news of his brother Bobby's death with his viewers.

It's revealed that Peter has been wearing Bobby's clothes throughout the film. Realizing he has lost both Edward and his mother, Peter accepts his fate. He receives a call from Vickie, seemingly confesses his mother's death, and prepares for the police's arrival. Peter is shown to have his shotgun, though he assures the viewers that the gun is empty and shuts off the camera, recites a verse from Revelations, and waits for the police, apparently resigned to his fate of appearing armed and dangerous.

The movie ends with the implication that Peter will be killed by the police, although the scene cuts off before showing the actual outcome.

== Cast ==
- David Oyelowo as Peter Snowden
- Heather Storm as Newscaster
- Barlow Jacobs as Beasley

== Production ==
On July 9, 2013, it was announced David Oyelowo would star in the film.

== Release ==
The film premiered at the Los Angeles Film Festival on June 17, 2014. The film premiered on HBO on May 29, 2015.

== Reception ==
Nightingale received positive reviews from critics, with Oyelowo's performance being praised. On Rotten Tomatoes, the film has a rating of 82%, based on 22 reviews, with a rating of 6.67/10. The website's critics consensus reads: "Nightingale serves up a breathtaking solo performance by David Oyelowo in a film served well by its modest cinematic style." On Metacritic, the film has a score of 67 out of 100, based on 13 critics, indicating "generally favorable reviews".

Sheri Linden of The Hollywood Reporter praised the film and wrote, "What makes the disturbing story gripping, beyond Oyelowo’s spellbinding performance, is its humor, defining compassion and incisive imagery." Joshua Aiston of The A.V. Club wrote that "the narrow perspective creates the disconcerting intimacy on which Nightingale thrives, but Lester’s strict adherence to it often feels compensatory and makes the film come across more like a conceptual exercise than a story."

The film did receive a number of negative reviews. Chuck Bowen of Slate wrote that "Nightingale is tediously literal-minded and anal-retentively 'worked out.' There's something stiflingly theoretical about the movie." Matthew Gilbert of The Boston Globe wrote, "What could have been an evocative journey into the mind of a lost veteran, as he opens up his thinking across a one-man show set entirely inside his house, is more like a quasi thriller revolving around a very mad hatter."

Oyelowo's performance was met with unanimous acclaim from critics. Alessandra Stanley of The New York Times wrote that "Mr. Oyelowo gives a riveting, disorienting and suspenseful tour of an unraveling mind".

== Awards and nominations ==
Year	Award	Category	Recipients	Outcome
2015	Critics' Choice Television Award	Best Movie	Nightingale	Nominated
2015	Critics' Choice Television Award	Best Actor in a Movie/Miniseries	David Oyelowo	Won
2015	Primetime Emmy Award	Outstanding Television Movie	Nightingale	Nominated
2015	Primetime Emmy Award	Outstanding Lead Actor in a Limited Series or Movie	David Oyelowo	Nominated
2016	Golden Globe Award	Best Actor – Miniseries or Television Film	David Oyelowo	Nominated
2016	NAACP Image Award	Outstanding Actor in a Television Movie, Mini-Series or Dramatic Special	David Oyelowo	Nominated
2016	Black Reel Award	Outstanding Actor, TV Movie or Limited Series	David Oyelowo	Won
2016	Satellite Award	Best Television Film	Nightingale	Nominated
2016	Satellite Award	Best Actor in a Miniseries or TV Film	David Oyelowo	Nominated
