= Voyage of the Sable Venus and Other Poems =

2015 poetry book by Robin Coste Lewis

- Cover of US paperback edition
- Author: Robin Coste Lewis
- Language: English
- Genre: Poetry
- Publisher: Alfred A. Knopf/Penguin Random House
- Publication date: 2015
- Publication place: United States
- Media type: Print (hardcover & paperback)

Voyage of the Sable Venus and Other Poems is the debut collection of poetry by Robin Coste Lewis, published in 2015 by Alfred A. Knopf. The title poem, 79 pages long, is named for an image by British painter Thomas Stothard. The collection won the National Book Award for Poetry, the first debut collection to win the award since 1974.

== Title and background ==
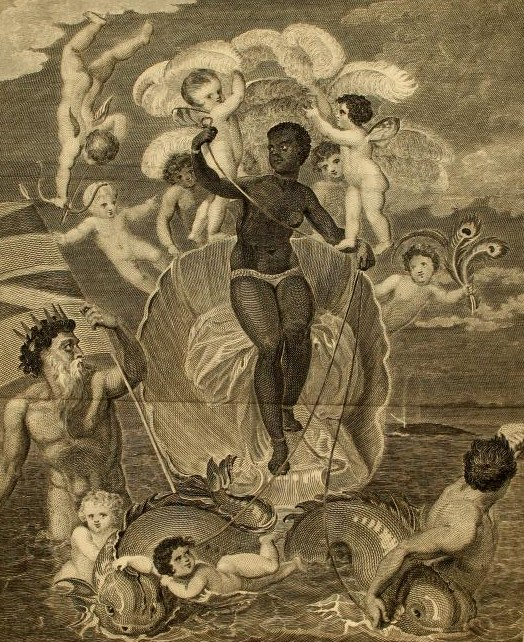
Engraving by William Grainger of Thomas Stothard, Voyage of the Sable Venus from Angola to the West Indies, 1801.

The title of the book comes from an image by British painter Thomas Stothard (1755–1834), an engraving of which served as the frontispiece of the 1801 edition of History, Civil and Commercial, of the British Colonies in the West Indies by British politician Bryan Edwards, a staunch supporter of the slave trade who published a number of books describing the economy and history of the West Indies. The image has an African woman who like many images of Venus Anadyomene stands on an opened half-shell, but this black Venus is surrounded by white cherubs and moves across the Middle Passage, urged on by Triton. Central allegorical tenets of the image are in turn based on a poem by Isaac Teale, "The Sable Venus: An Ode" (included in Edwards' book) which, according to Dan Chiasson, who reviewed Lewis's collection in The New Yorker, "celebrates the pleasures of raping slave women, since black and white—Sable Venus and Botticelli's Venus—are, after all, the same 'at night'. Psychoanalyst and literary scholar Michael Vannoy Adams notes that the image is "euphemism that represses the enormity of the slave trade and conveniently excuses it" and presents the Middle Passage as a route taken by choice, rather than by force.

== Content and structure ==
The collection was described by Alexandra Alter as "a meditation on cultural and artistic depictions of the black female figure that juxtaposes autobiographical verses with reflections on cultural stereotypes and art".

It contains three parts; the first and the third are mostly lyric poems in the first person, and showcasing "elements of a rich and complicated life", according to Diana Arterian. One of the poems Arterian singled out is the second in the collection, "On the Road to Sri Bhuvaneshwari", an almost ten-page long poem "employing William Carlos Williams’ triadic stair-step line extended to quatrains", a rare kind of poem. The first and the third sections bookend a central section; according to Arterian, that central section presents the writer's life through history in contrast to "her life".

The middle section, "Voyage of the Sable Venus", a poem 79 pages long, is more conceptual and provides the title for the book. It consists entirely of "'titles, catalog entries, or exhibit descriptions' of objects in Western art that depict the black female form, going back to 38,000 B.C." Lewis uses the titles and descriptions to unsettle contemporary ideas about the roles played by the "black female figure". Curators of historical and artistic objects frequently excised terms "such as slave, colored, and Negro...and replace[d] these words instead with the sanitized, but perhaps equally vapid, African-American"; Lewis reinstates those terms to uncover the sanitation of black culture. Lewis also takes works by contemporary black and queer artists as inspiration. According to Diane Schwarz, it "catalogs the creative life force that has always existed within and outside of violent histories of colonial conquest".

== Critical reception ==
Voyage of the Sable Venus and Other Poems received many positive reviews. Dan Chiasson's lengthy review in The New Yorker praised the conception and execution of Lewis' "many-chambered and remarkable collection", noting how form enhances meaning, especially in a "formally inventive section divides women from the objects that embody them by a method of formal panning, where the residue of personhood is extracted and isolated on the page". Diana Arterian remarked that the "book compellingly and terrifyingly documents the racist patriarchal systems...and so with a remarkable hopefulness, and in the face of what would make most rage and/or collapse". Claire Schwarz, writing for The Georgia Review, called the book "stunning".

== Publication history, National Book Award ==
Robin Coste Lewis's Voyage of the Sable Venus is a meditation on the cultural depiction of the black female figure. Juxtaposing autobiography with art-historical constructs of racial identity, she defines and creates self. In poems that consider the boundaries of beauty and terror, Coste Lewis intimately involves us with all that has formed her. The aesthetic and psychological complexity of this work is underscored by its clarity. This voice is essential to our present moment.

— Judges citation, National Book Foundation

The book was published in hardcover in September 2015, and in paperback in November 2017. The cover is a photograph by Eudora Welty taken in Mississippi in the 1930s, of an African-American woman, in profile, looking into a shop window from the sidewalk.

It won the National Book Award for Poetry in 2015; other finalists included Terrance Hayes's How to Be Drawn.
