= Brenda Hillman =

American poet and translator (born 1951)

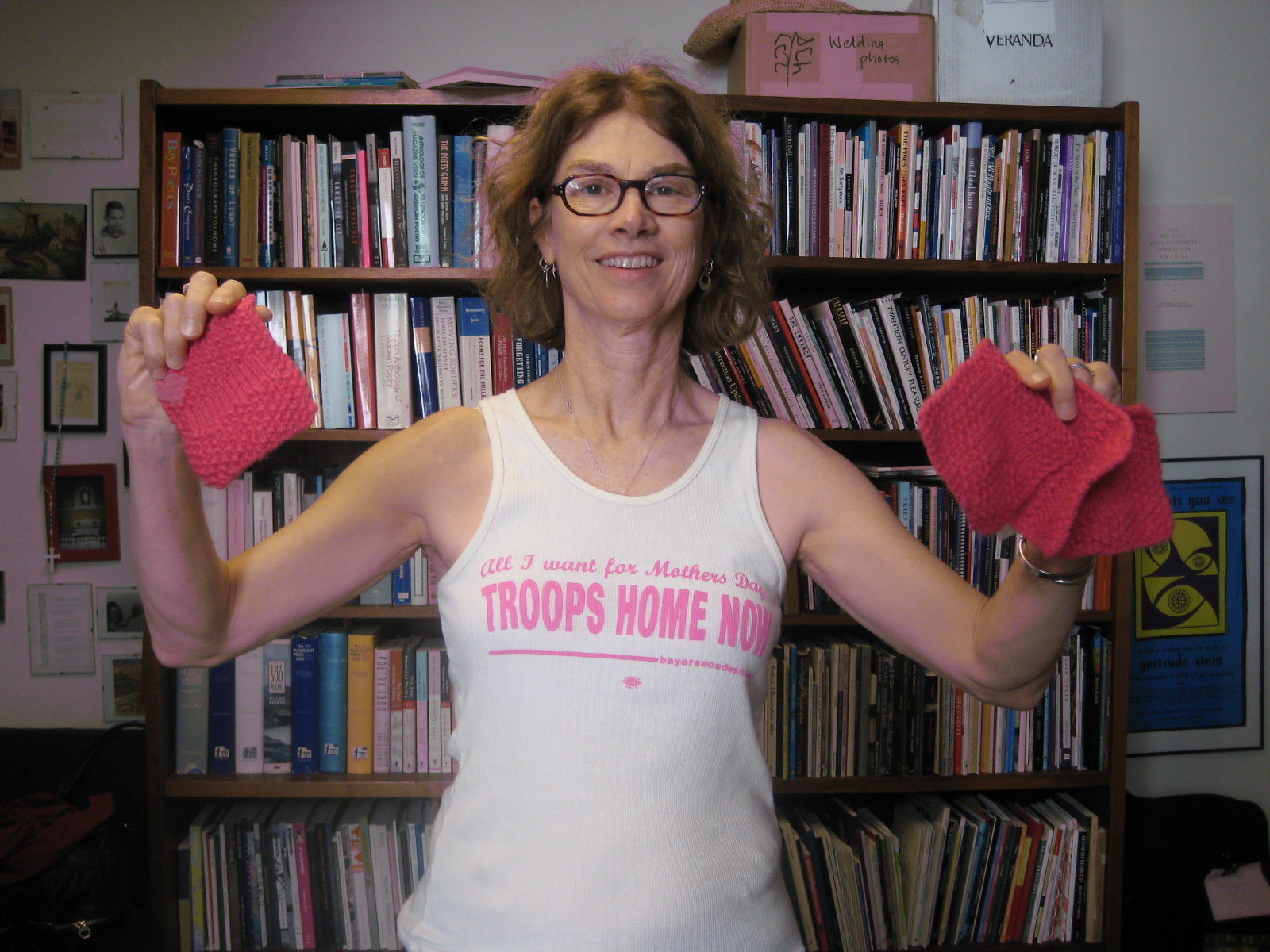
- Born: March 27, 1951 (age 75); Tucson, Arizona, U.S.
- Education: Pomona College (BA); University of Iowa (MFA)
- Occupations: Professor, poet
- Spouse(s): Leonard Michaels; Robert Hass
- Writing career
- Genre: Poetry
- Notable awards: Los Angeles Times Book Prize (2009); Griffin Poetry Prize (2014); National Book Award (2026)

Brenda Hillman (born March 27, 1951, in Tucson, Arizona) is an American poet and translator.

She is the author of twelve collections of poetry: White Dress; Fortress; Death Tractates; Bright Existence; Loose Sugar; Cascadia; Pieces of Air in the Epic; Practical Water (for which she won the Los Angeles Times Book Prize for Poetry); Seasonal Works with Letters on Fire (which received the Griffin Poetry Prize); Extra Hidden Life, among the Days; In a Few Minutes Before Later; and Still House in the Desert. Hillman received the 2026 National Book Award for Still House in the Desert An eco-contemplation, published by Wesleyan University Press. She has also received the 2012 Academy of American Poets Fellowship, the 2006 William Carlos Williams Award, and fellowships from the National Endowment for the Arts and the Solomon R. Guggenheim Foundation.

She is the emeritus Filippi Professor of Poetry at Saint Mary's College of California. Hillman is also involved in non-violent activism with the organization Code Pink. In 2016, she was elected a Chancellor of the Academy of American Poets. Since 2021 she has directed the poetry program at the Community of Writers summer workshops in Olympic Valley, California.

== Biography ==
She was educated at Pomona College, and received her M.F.A. at the Iowa Writers' Workshop. She is the emeritus Filippi Professor of Poetry at Saint Mary's College in Moraga, California. She also had a residency at the Atlantic Center for the Arts.

Hillman met the writer Leonard Michaels in Iowa City in 1975; they were married in Berkeley in 1976 and divorced in 1985. They had a daughter together. Currently, she is married to the poet Robert Hass.

== Work ==
Brenda Hillman is known for poems that draw on elements of found texts, personal meditation, observation, and literary theory. Often described as “sensuous” and “luminescent,” Hillman's poetry pushes at the possibilities of form and voice, while remaining grounded in topics such as geology, the environment, politics, family, and spirituality. In an interview with Sarah Rosenthal, Hillman described her own understanding of form: "It is the artist’s job to make form. Not even to make it, but to allow it. Allow form. And all artists have a different relationship to it, and a different philosophy of it."

Brenda Hillman has published twelve collections of poetry, all from Wesleyan University Press, including White Dress (1985), Fortress (1989), Death Tractates (1992), Bright Existence (1993), Loose Sugar (1997), Cascadia (2001), Pieces of Air in the Epic (2005), and Practical Water (2009) (for which she won the Los Angeles Times Book Prize for Poetry). Her ninth collection of poetry, the final volume in her tetralogy of books about the classical elements, Seasonal Works with Letters on Fire (2013), received the International Griffin Poetry Prize for 2014, as well as the California Book Awards Gold Medal in Poetry. Her book Extra Hidden Life, among the Days, was described as “her most radical poetry collection yet.”

Hillman is also the author of four chapbooks: Case History and Other Poems (edited by Colin Simms, Genera, 1975), Coffee, 3 a.m. (Penumbra Press, 1982), Autumn Sojourn (Em Press, 1994), and The Firecage (a+bend press, 2000).

She edited an edition of Emily Dickinson's poetry for Shambhala Publications, and, with Patricia Dienstfrey, co-edited The Grand Permission: New Writings on Poetics and Motherhood (2003). With Paul Ebenkamp, she co-edited Writing the Silences: Richard O. Moore (2010). She co-translated, with Diallah Haidar, Poems from Above the Hill: Selected Poems of Ashur Etwebi. In 2010 she co-translated Jeongrye Choi's book of poems, Instances, released by Parlor Press, with Choi and Wayne de Fremery.

Hillman has been interested in experimental lyric traditions, particularly in how the Romantic concepts of nature and spirit have manifested in contemporary poetry. In her essay entitled "Split, Spark, and Space", Hillman writes about the emergence of different kinds of lyric impulses in her writing: "The sense of a single 'voice' in poetry grew to include polyphonies, oddly collective dictations, and the process of writing itself."

== Critical reception ==
Hillman’s early poetry collections received critical praise for their transfiguration of experience. With the publication of Loose Sugar, however, Hillman acquired a larger reputation in the world of contemporary poetry.

Reviewing Practical Water for the Boston Review, Craig Morgan Teicher writes about Hillman’s process: "Hillman has charted her own unusual course, borrowing things—a mixture of conversational and high-lyric diction, an emphasis on language’s materiality, an interest in metaphysics and occult knowledge, and a passionate environmental and political consciousness—from pretty much every major poetic movement of the last century." Practical Water includes transcripts from United States congressional hearing, within which Hillman tries to "seek out the humanity behind policy and policymakers."

The fourth volume in her classical element series, Seasonal Works With Letters on Fire, was longlisted for the National Book Award for Poetry and won a California Book Award Gold Medal in Poetry, was a runner-up for the Northern California Book Award for Poetry, and won the International Griffin Poetry Prize. Dean Rader praised the work, writing: "Seasonal Works With Letters On Fire is a profoundly humane work. In language that moves from the chatty to the experimental to the heightened to the rhetorical, Hillman shows us once again that poetry is itself a tireless worker, always on our behalf."

== Awards ==
- 1984 National Endowment for the Arts Fellowship
- 1989 Pushcart Prize
- 1994 Guggenheim Fellowship
- 1994 Pulitzer Prize for Poetry finalist
- 1997 National Book Critics Circle Award for Poetry finalist
- 2006 William Carlos Williams Award
- 2009 Los Angeles Times Book Prize for Poetry
- 2014 International Griffin Poetry Prize
- 2019 Northern California Book Award
- 2023 Four Quartets Prize finalist
- 2025 PEN Oakland Reginald Lockett Lifetime Achievement Award
- 2026 National Book Award for Poetry for Still House in the Desert: An eco-contemplation.

== Works ==
=== Books ===
- White Dress. Wesleyan University Press. 1985. ISBN 978-0-8195-2121-7.
- Fortress. Wesleyan University Press. 1989. ISBN 978-0-8195-1168-3.
- Death Tractates. Wesleyan University Press. 1992. ISBN 978-0-8195-1202-4.
- Bright Existence. Wesleyan University Press. 1993. ISBN 978-0-8195-1207-9.
- Loose Sugar. Wesleyan University Press. 1997. ISBN 978-0-8195-2243-6.
- Cascadia. Wesleyan University Press. 2001. ISBN 978-0-8195-6492-4.
- Pieces of Air in the Epic. Wesleyan University Press. 2005. ISBN 978-0-8195-6787-1.
- Practical Water. Wesleyan University Press. 2009. ISBN 978-0-8195-6931-8.
- Seasonal Works with Letters on Fire. Wesleyan University Press. 2013. ISBN 978-0-8195-7415-2.
- In a Few Minutes Before Later. Wesleyan University Press. 2024. ISBN 978-0-8195-0122-6.
- Still House in the Desert: An eco-contemplation. Wesleyan University Press. 2026. ISBN 978-0819502414

=== Chapbooks ===
- Coffee, 3 A.M. (Penumbra Press, 1982)
- Autumn Sojourn (Em Press, 1995)
- The Firecage (a+bend press, 2000)

=== Edited books ===
- Brenda Hillman, ed. (1995). The Pocket Emily Dickinson. Shambhala Publications. ISBN 978-1-59030-700-7
- Patricia Dienstfrey; Brenda Hillman, eds. (2003). The Grand Permission: New Writings on Poetics and Motherhood. Wesleyan University Press. ISBN 978-0-8195-6644-7.
- Brenda Hillman; Paul Ebenkamp, eds. (2010). Writing the Silences, New California Poetry. University of California Press. ISBN 978-0-520-26244-7.

=== Translations ===
- Brenda Hillman, Jeongrye Choi, Wayne de Fremery, trans. (2010). Instances: Jeongrye Choi. Parlor Press.
- Diallah Haidar, Brenda Hillman, trans. (2011). Poems from Above the Hill: Selected Poems of Ashur Etwebi. Parlor Press.

=== Anthology chapters ===
- Lucille Lang Day and Ruth Nolan, eds. (2018). Fire and Rain: Ecopoetry of California. Scarlet Tanager Books.
- Melissa Tuckey, ed. (2018). Ghost Fishing: An Eco-Justice Poetry Anthology. University of Georgia Press.
