= Jim Harrison =

American poet, novelist, and essayist (1937–2016)

- Born: James Harrison; December 11, 1937; Grayling, Michigan, U.S.
- Died: March 26, 2016 (aged 78); Patagonia, Arizona, U.S.
- Education: Michigan State University (BA, MA)
- Occupations: Novelist; poet; essayist
- Spouse: Linda King Harrison (died 2015)
- Children: 2
- Writing career
- Genres: Fiction; non-fiction; poetry

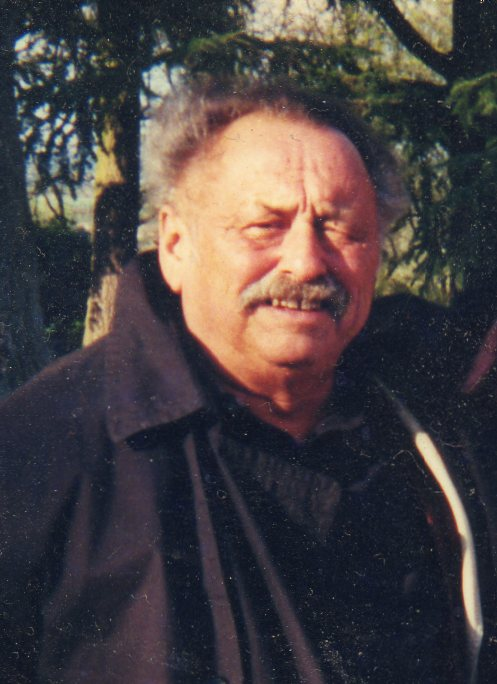
Harrison in 1998

James Harrison (December 11, 1937 – March 26, 2016) was an American poet, novelist, and essayist. He was a prolific and versatile writer publishing over three dozen books in several genres including poetry, fiction, nonfiction, children's literature, and memoir. He wrote screenplays, book reviews, literary criticism, and published essays on food, travel, and sport. Harrison indicated that, of all his writing, his poetry meant the most to him.

Harrison published 24 novellas during his lifetime and is considered "America's foremost master" of that form. His first commercial success came with the 1979 publication of the trilogy of novellas Legends of the Fall, two of which were made into movies.

Harrison's work has been translated into multiple languages including Spanish, French, Greek, Chinese, and Russian. He was the recipient of multiple awards and honors including a Guggenheim Fellowship (1969), the Mark Twain Award for distinguished contributions to Midwestern literature (1990), and induction into the American Academy of Arts & Letters (2007). Harrison wrote that "The dream that I could write a good poem, a good novel, or even a good movie for that matter, has devoured my life."

== Biography ==
Harrison was born in Grayling, Michigan, to Winfield Sprague Harrison, a county agricultural agent, and Norma Olivia (Wahlgren) Harrison, both avid readers. Harrison was born 18 months after oldest child John, with whom he was close. His younger siblings are Judith, Mary, and David.

Harrison became blind in one eye after a childhood accident. He wrote about this in an early poem:

My left eye is blind and jogs like
a milky sparrow in its socket...

— Jim Harrison, "Sketch for A Job Application Blank" (excerpt), Plain Song

Harrison graduated from Haslett High School (Haslett, Michigan) in 1956. When he was 24, on November 21, 1962, his father and sister Judy died in an automobile accident.

In 1959, he married Linda King, with whom he had two daughters. He was educated at Michigan State University, where he received a B.A. (1960) and M.A. (1964) in comparative literature. After a short stint as assistant professor of English at Stony Brook University (1965–66), Harrison started working full-time as a writer. His awards include National Endowment for the Arts grants (1967, 1968, and 1969), a Guggenheim Fellowship (1969–70), the Spirit of the West Award from the Mountain & Plains Booksellers Association, and election to the American Academy of Arts and Letters (2007).

His work has appeared in many leading publications, including The New Yorker, Esquire, Sports Illustrated, Rolling Stone, Outside, Playboy, Men's Journal, and The New York Times Book Review. He published several collections of novellas, two of which were eventually turned into films: Revenge (1990) and Legends of the Fall (1994).

Much of Harrison's writing is set in sparsely populated regions of North America and its West. Many stories are set in places such as Nebraska's Sand Hills, Michigan's Upper Peninsula, Montana's mountains, and along the Arizona–Mexico border.

Harrison lived in Patagonia, Arizona, Livingston, Montana, and Grand Marais, Michigan. On August 31, 2009, he was featured in an episode of Anthony Bourdain's television show No Reservations, which took place in and around Livingston. He also appeared in season 7 of Bourdain's CNN series, Anthony Bourdain: Parts Unknown, in an episode which first aired on May 15, 2016.

Harrison died of heart failure at his writing desk at home in Patagonia, Arizona on the morning of 26 March 2016 (Easter Saturday), while drafting a poem; the last (unpunctuated) line he wrote was "Man shits his pants and trashed God's body".

== Prose works ==
=== Early career ===
Harrison said he became a novelist after he fell off a cliff while bird hunting. During his convalescence, his friend Thomas McGuane suggested he write a novel, and Wolf: A False Memoir (1971) was the result. It is the story of a man who tells his life story while searching for signs of a wolf in the northern Michigan wilderness. This was followed by A Good Day to Die (1973), an ecotage novel and statement about the decline of American ecological systems, and Farmer (1976), a Lolita-like account of a country school teacher and farmer coming to grips with middle age, his mother's dying, and complications of human sexuality.

Harrison's first novellas were published in 1979 under the title Legends of the Fall. The actor Jack Nicholson, a close friend of Harrison's whom he had met through Thomas McGuane, played a peripheral role in the creation of that book. When Nicholson heard that Harrison was broke, he sent $30,000, which allowed Harrison to write Legends of the Fall. The title novella is an epic story that spans 50 years and tells the tale of a father and three sons in the vast spaces of the northern Rocky Mountains around the time of World War I. Referring to the title novella, Harrison said:

"I wrote Legends of the Fall in nine days and when I re-read it, I only had to change one word. There was no revision process. None. I had thought so much about the character that writing the book was like taking dictation. I felt overwhelmed when I finished, I needed to take a vacation, but the book was done."

The novella format would become an important part of both Harrison's future reputation and his output. Following Legends of the Fall, seven more collections of novellas appeared over the course of Harrison's lifetime: The Woman Lit by Fireflies (1990), Julip (1994), The Beast God Forgot to Invent (2000), The Summer He Didn't Die (2005), The Farmer's Daughter (2009), The River Swimmer (2013), and finally The Ancient Minstrel (2016), the latter appearing just before Harrison's death in March of that year.

After publishing Warlock (1981) and Sundog (1984), Harrison published Dalva (1988), one of his best-known novels. It is a complex tale, set in rural Nebraska, of a woman's search for the son she had given up for adoption and for the boy's father, who also happened to be her half-brother. Throughout the narrative, Dalva invokes the memory of her pioneer great-grandfather John Wesley Northridge, an Andersonville survivor during the Civil War and naturalist, whose diaries vividly tell of the destruction of the Plains Indian way of life. Many of these characters are featured also in The Road Home (1998), a complex work using five narrators, including Dalva, her 30-year-old son Nelse, and her grandfather John Wesley Northridge II. Harrison has been described as trying to get at "the soul history of where you live" in this sequel to Dalva, in this case rural Nebraska in the latter half of the 20th century.

By the time Harrison turned 60 in 1998, he had published both a dozen works of fiction and another dozen volumes of poetry.

=== Later life and writings ===
In terms of his publishing career, Harrison's final 18 years, after he turned 60, would be nearly as productive as the preceding 30 years. After age 60, he published another dozen works of fiction, at least six more volumes of poetry, a memoir Off to the Side, and The Raw and the Cooked: Adventures of a Roving Gourmand, a collection of his food essays which had first appeared in magazines, mostly in Esquire and Men's Journal.

Although he continued writing in the novella format, during these final years (1999–2016), Harrison refocused his efforts on the longer novel form. In the 2000s, Harrison published two of the most ambitious novels, setting them in Michigan's Upper Peninsula: True North (2004) and its sequel Returning to Earth (2007). True North examines the costs to a timber and mining family torn apart by alcoholism and the moral recklessness of a war-damaged father. The novel contains two stories: that of the monstrous father and that of the son's trying to atone for his father's evil, and ultimately, reconciling with his family's history.

Returning to Earth (2007) revisits the characters and setting of True North (2004) 30 years later. The story has four narrators: Donald, a mixed-blood Indian, now middle-aged and dying of Lou Gehrig's disease; Donald's wife Cynthia, whom he rescued as a teen from the ruins of her family; Cynthia's brother David (the central character of True North); and K, Cynthia's nephew and Donald's soul mate. Ultimately, the extended family helps Donald end his life at the place of his choosing, and then draw on the powers of love and commitment to reconcile loss and heal wounds borne for generations.

Harrison's The English Major (2008) is a road novel about a 60-year-old former high school English teacher and farmer from Michigan, who after a divorce and the sale of his farm, heads westward on a mind-clearing road trip. Along the way, he falls into an affair with a former student, reconnects with his big-shot son in San Francisco, confers on questions of life and lust with an old doctor friend, and undertakes a project to rename all the states and their state birds.

Harrison wrote two darkly comic detective novels, The Great Leader: A Faux Mystery (Grove Press, 2012) and The Big Seven (Grove Press, 2015), both focused on protagonist Detective Sunderson. The Great Leader: A Faux Mystery was positively reviewed in The New York Times, with critic Pete Dexter calling Harrison's writing "very close to magic."

== Poetry ==
=== Publication history ===
Inspired by his study of Pablo Neruda, Harrison completed what he called his first acceptable poems in the early 1960s. In 1965 he had several poems published in The Nation and Poetry and then, with the assistance of the poet Denise Levertov, he published his first poetry collection, Plain Song (1965).

Over the course of his life Harrison published his poetry in many periodicals including Virginia Quarterly Review, Triquarterly, The American Poetry Review, and The New York Times Book Review. He published 17 collections of poetry (the number includes chapbooks, limited editions, and coauthored works). The Shape of the Journey: New and Collected Poems (1998) collects over 120 of his poems. The posthumous Jim Harrison: The Essential Poems (2019) was selected from nearly 1000 poems that Harrison wrote.

Harrison was aware that his poetry did not have mass appeal. He wrote that to draw attention to poetry "you would have to immolate a volunteer poet in an 751 BMW". He hoped that by choosing a small press like Copper Canyon Press, his poetry collections would stay in print.

Dead Man's Float (2016), his final book of poetry, was published the year of his death.

=== Influences ===
Harrison began his study of poetry as a teenager and, as a young man, thought of himself as "a poet and nothing else". His earliest influences included Arthur Rimbaud, Richard Wright, and Walt Whitman.

Harrison studied a multitude of English speaking poets including W.B. Yeats, Dylan Thomas, Robert Bly, and Robert Duncan. Harrison also cited a diverse set of influences from world poetry including: French Symbolist poetry; the Russian poets Georgy Ivanov and Vladimir Mayakovsky; the German poet Rainier Maria Rilke; and Chinese Tang dynasty poetry. (Note: Harrison discusses his poetic influences in his memoir Off to the Side, A Memoir (2002); e.g., see pages 38, 55, 66, 125, 174, 177, 180, 187, 232, and 245. He also discusses his influences in the introduction to his collection of poetry The Shape of the Journey (1998).) He felt a particular affinity for the French poet Rene Char and the Russian poet Sergei Yesenin as they both came "from humble beginnings out in the country". Harrison's sequence of prose poems Letters to Yesenin (1973) was inspired by Yesenin.

Harrison's practice of Zen Buddhism was important to his poetry, in part because it kept his "head from flying off". He became aware of Zen inspired poetry "by way of poets like Clayton Eshleman and Cid Corman, and most powerfully of all through Gary Snyder". He wrote that his long poem The Theory and Practice of Rivers (1986) was "basically Zennist". His sequence of 57 poems After Ikkyū (1996) is entitled after the Zen monk Ikkyū and was occasioned by his study of the Zen sages Tung-shan and Yunmen.

=== Nature poetry ===
Harrison's poetry often concerns itself with the natural world. Nonhuman creatures, especially birds and dogs, populate his poetry and wild, uncivilized places are frequent settings. Harrison's poetry "returns us to some level of understanding about our relationship to other life on the planet". Harrison wrote that his "intimacy with the natural world has been a substitute for religion, or a religion of another sort." The River, one of Harrison's later poems, is illustrative:

...Then again maybe we'll be cast
at the speed of light through the universe
to God's throne. His hair is bounteous.
All the 5,000 birds on earth were created there.
The firstborn cranes, herons, hawks, at the back
so as not to frighten the little ones.
Even now they remember this divine habitat.
Shall we gather at the river, this beautiful river?
We'll sing with the warblers perched on his eyelashes.

— Jim Harrison, "The River" (excerpt), Dead Man's Float (2016)

== Harrison bibliographies, biographies, and interviews ==
In 2009, University of Nebraska Press published Jim Harrison: A Comprehensive Bibliography, 1964–2008, an illustrated guide to Harrison's published works, edited by Gregg Orr and Beef Torrey, with an introduction by Robert DeMott, which contains more than 1600 citations of writing by and about Harrison. Many of Harrison's papers are housed at Grand Valley State University in Allendale, Michigan.

Harrison was interviewed in 2004 in Paris by François Busnel, and was asked how he explained the success of his novel, True North, in the United States where his previous books were not successful. Harrison replied, "The age, undoubtedly! Or a proof that America loves France, since it is said often over there that I am the most French of the American writers."

Many of Harrison's interviews between 1976 and 1999 are collected in the book, Conversations with Jim Harrison, edited by Robert DeMott, published by the University Press of Mississippi, 2002. Harrison discusses his poetry in an extensive interview in Five Points Magazine.

Todd Goddard's Devouring Time: Jim Harrison, A Writer's Life, the first full-length biography of Harrison, was published on November 4, 2025, by Blackstone Publishing.

== Film work ==
Harrison's work on films and in the screenplay format began with his book Legends of the Fall, when he sold the film rights for all three stories in the book and became involved in writing the screenplay for the film with the same title. It was directed by Edward Zwick and starred Brad Pitt, Anthony Hopkins, and Aidan Quinn; it won the 1995 Academy Award for cinematography. Harrison had a writing credit for the film.

Other films he scripted or co-wrote include Cold Feet (1989), with Keith Carradine, Tom Waits, and Rip Torn, and Revenge (1990), starring Kevin Costner. For his work on the screenplay for Wolf (1994, starring Jack Nicholson) Harrison, along with co-writer Wesley Strick, shared the Saturn Award for Best Writing.

== Bibliography ==
=== Novels ===
- Wolf: A False Memoir (1971)
- A Good Day to Die (1973)
- Farmer (1976)
- Warlock (1981)
- Sundog: The Story of an American Foreman, Robert Corvus Strang (1984)
- Dalva (1988)
- The Road Home (1998) ISBN 9780871137296, OCLC 39235548
- True North (2004)
- Returning To Earth (2007) ISBN 9781597225229, OCLC 71369560
- The English Major (2008) ISBN 9780802118639, OCLC 243473921
- The Great Leader (2011) ISBN 9780802119704, OCLC 707255777
- The Big Seven (2015) ISBN 9780802123923, OCLC 891155364

=== Novellas ===
- Legends of the Fall (1979). Three novellas: "Revenge", "The Man Who Gave Up His Name", and "Legends of the Fall".
- The Woman Lit By Fireflies (1990). Three novellas: "Brown Dog", "Sunset Limited", and "The Woman Lit by Fireflies".
- Julip (1994). Three novellas: "Julip", "The Seven-Ounce Man", and "The Beige Dolorosa".
- The Beast God Forgot to Invent (2000). Three novellas: "The Beast God Forgot to Invent", "Westward Ho", and "I Forgot to Go to Spain".
- The Summer He Didn't Die (2005). Three novellas: "The Summer He Didn't Die", "Republican Wives", and "Tracking".
- The Farmer's Daughter (2009). Three novellas: "The Farmer's Daughter", "Brown Dog Redux", and "The Games of Night".
- The River Swimmer (2013). Two novellas: "The Land of Unlikeness" and "The River Swimmer".
- Brown Dog (2013). Five previously published 'Brown Dog' novellas (Note: "Brown Dog", "The Seven-Ounce Man", "Westward Ho", "The Summer He Didn't Die", "Brown Dog Redux") and a new one: "He Dog".
- The Ancient Minstrel (2016). Three novellas: "The Ancient Minstrel", "Eggs", and "The Case of the Howling Buddhas".

=== Nonfiction ===
- Just Before Dark: Collected Nonfiction (1991)
- The Raw and the Cooked (1992) Dim Gray Bar Press ltd ed
- The Raw and the Cooked: Adventures of a Roving Gourmand (2001)
- Off to the Side: A Memoir (2002)
- A Really Big Lunch: Meditations on Food and Life from the Roving Gourmand (2017)
- Search for the Genuine, The: Nonfiction, 1970–2015 (2022)

=== Children's literature ===
- The Boy Who Ran to the Woods (Illustrated by Tom Pohrt) (2000)

=== Poetry ===
- Plain Song (W.W. Norton, 1965)
- Walking (Pym-Randall Press, 1967)
- Locations (W.W. Norton, 1968)
- Outlyer and Ghazals (Simon and Schuster, 1971)
- Letters to Yesenin (Sumac, 1973)
- Returning to Earth (Court Street Chapbook Series) (Ithaca Street, 1977)
- Selected and New Poems, 1961–1981 (Houghton Mifflin, 1981)
- Natural World: A Bestiary (Open Book, 1982)
- The Theory & Practice of Rivers (Winn, 1986). Republished 1989 by Clark City Press.
- After Ikkyu and Other Poems (Shambhala, 1996)
- The Shape of the Journey: New and Collected Poems (Copper Canyon Press, 1998)
- A Conversation (Aralia Press, 2002). Chapbook coauthored with Ted Kooser.
- Braided Creek: A Conversation in Poetry (Copper Canyon Press, 2003). Coauthored with Ted Kooser.
- Livingston Suite (Limberlost Press, 2005). Illustrated by Greg Keeler.
- Saving Daylight (Copper Canyon Press, 2006)
- In Search of Small Gods (Copper Canyon Press, 2009)
- Songs of Unreason (Copper Canyon Press, 2011)
- Dead Man's Float (Copper Canyon Press, 2016)
- Jim Harrison: The Essential Poems (Copper Canyon Press, 2019). Edited by Joseph Bednarik.
- Jim Harrison: Complete Poems (Copper Canyon Press, 2021). Edited by Joseph Bednarik.

== Filmography ==
Writer

- Dalva (1996)
- Carried Away (1996)
- Legends of the Fall (1994)
- Wolf (1994) (Also producer)
- Revenge (1990)
- Cold Feet (1989)

Self

- Here is Something Beautiful (announced)
- La grande librairie (2009–2015)
- Café littéraire (2010)
- The Practice of the Wild (2010)
- Amérique, notre histoire (2006)
- Le cercle de minuit (1995)
