= Wolf (1994 film) =

1994 American romantic horror film by Mike Nichols

- Theatrical release poster
- Directed by: Mike Nichols
- Written by: Jim Harrison; Wesley Strick
- Produced by: Douglas Wick
- Starring: Jack Nicholson; Michelle Pfeiffer; James Spader; Kate Nelligan; Richard Jenkins; Christopher Plummer
- Cinematography: Giuseppe Rotunno
- Edited by: Sam O'Steen
- Music by: Ennio Morricone
- Production company: Red Wagon Entertainment
- Distributed by: Columbia Pictures
- Release date: June 17, 1994 (United States)
- Running time: 125 minutes
- Country: United States
- Language: English
- Budget: $70 million
- Box office: $131 million

Wolf is a 1994 American romantic horror film directed by Mike Nichols and starring Jack Nicholson, Michelle Pfeiffer, James Spader, Kate Nelligan, Richard Jenkins, Christopher Plummer, Eileen Atkins, David Hyde Pierce and Om Puri. It was written by Jim Harrison and Wesley Strick, and an uncredited Elaine May. The music was composed by Ennio Morricone, and the cinematography was done by Giuseppe Rotunno.

Wolf was released by Columbia Pictures on June 17, 1994. The film received positive reviews from critics and grossed $131 million against a $70 million budget.

== Plot ==
Will Randall, editor-in-chief of a large New York publishing house, runs over a large black wolf on a Vermont country road; he is bitten while attempting to help it. A few days later, tycoon Raymond Alden announces that he's taking over the publishing house. The experienced and ailing Will accepts a demotion while his unscrupulous protégé Stewart Swinton is given his previous position. Will meets Alden's headstrong yet little-accomplished daughter, Laura. Will soon finds his vitality increased and his senses sharpened, which leads him to suspect his wife Charlotte and Swinton are having an affair after smelling Swinton's scent on Charlotte's clothing. Will's suspicion is confirmed when he surprises the two in Swinton's apartment. He angrily bites Swinton's hand before leaving Charlotte.

Will begins a relationship with Laura and spends the night at the Aldens' villa after suffering a fainting spell. He awakens in a transformed state and mauls a deer in the estate's park, later awakening covered in blood. He visits pagan expert Dr. Vijay Alezais, who explains he is transforming into a wolf. He gives Will an amulet to prevent his transformation's completion. That night, during another transformation, Will breaks into a zoo, steals handcuffs from a policeman while evading arrest, and viciously attacks a group of muggers. He wakes up in his hotel, with no memory of the previous night.

Will organizes a mutiny of writers who threaten to leave the publishing house unless Will remains editor-in-chief. Alden agrees, and Will's first act is to fire Stewart. He urinates on his shoes in a bathroom, claiming he is "marking his territory". While washing his hands, Will finds a mugger's finger in his handkerchief and realizes he wounded someone. He cuffs himself to his hotel room radiator, but Laura arrives and allays his fears. They spend the night together, but Will later leaves the hotel room unnoticed and roams Central Park transformed. The next morning, Detective Carl Bridger informs Will that Charlotte was found dead in Central Park with canine DNA on her.

That evening, Laura locks Will in a horse stable at his request and makes her way to the police station to give a statement. There she runs into Swinton, who is behaving brutishly and sporting golden eyes. Laura hurries away, making arrangements for her and Will to leave the country. Swinton follows Laura and invades the estate, killing two guards. When Swinton attempts to rape Laura, Will discards the amulet and fights Swinton, ruthlessly mauling him. Laura grabs a gun from a dead guard and finishes off Swinton. Will, still in a half-human state, has a brief moment with Laura and then disappears into the New England woods. Minutes later, Laura amazes Bridger with her heightened senses as she takes her leave. Will, having transformed into a wolf, howls for Laura in the woods as Laura's eyes begin to change as Will's and Swinton's did.

== Cast ==
- Jack Nicholson as Will Randall
- Michelle Pfeiffer as Laura Alden
- James Spader as Stewart Swinton
- Kate Nelligan as Charlotte Skylar Randall
- Richard Jenkins as Detective Sgt. Carl Bridger
- Christopher Plummer as Raymond Alden
- Eileen Atkins as Mary
- David Hyde Pierce as Roy MacAllister
- Om Puri as Dr. Vijay Alezais
- Ron Rifkin as Doctor Ralph
- Prunella Scales as Maude Waggins
- Brian Markinson as Detective Kevin Wade
- Peter Gerety as George
- Bradford English as Keyes
- Stewart J. Zully as Gary
- Thomas F. Duffy as Tom
- David Schwimmer as Cop
- Allison Janney as Party Guest 2
- Lia Chang as Desk Clerk
- Jose Soto as Punk 1
- Van Bailey as Punk 2
- Dwayne McClary as Punk 3
- Starletta DuPois as Victim's Mother (one of the punks)
- Johanna Marlowe as Park Woman

== Production ==
Screenwriter Jim Harrison left the production because of creative differences with director Mike Nichols, claiming, "I wanted Dionysian, but he wanted Apollonian. He took my wolf and made it into a Chihuahua. I cracked up for 10 minutes and then went out into the country and stood in front of a wolf den and apologized while my dog hid under the truck." Following his experience with the film, Harrison decided to leave Hollywood.

Mia Farrow was initially signed on for the role of Charlotte Randall, but was apparently considered too controversial a choice by the film company due to the then-current Woody Allen and Soon-Yi Previn affair. She decided to take a pay cut to accommodate the studios but had to eventually bow out in the long run due to other scheduling conflicts. Kate Nelligan was immediately cast instead. Sharon Stone turned down the role of Laura Alden, eventually played by Michelle Pfeiffer.

Filming took place in New York City, Long Island, and Los Angeles. The exteriors for Raymond Alden (Christopher Plummer)'s country mansion were filmed at Old Westbury Gardens in Nassau County, New York. Will Randall (Jack Nicholson)'s publishing offices are in the Bradbury Building in downtown Los Angeles, a location frequently used in movies.

The film was shot from early April to late July in 1993. Its release was delayed for six to eight months, in order to reshoot the poorly received ending.

The wolves were professionally trained by employees from Thousand Oaks, California's Animal Actors of Hollywood and Palmdale, California's Performing Animal Troupe.

== Reception ==
=== Box office ===
Wolf grossed $65 million domestically and $66 million internationally, for a total of $131 million worldwide.

=== Critical response ===
Wolf holds a score of 62% on Rotten Tomatoes based on 63 reviews. The website's consensus reads, "Wolf misses the jugular after showing flashes of killer instinct early on, but engaging stars and deft direction make this a unique horror-romance worth watching".

Janet Maslin of The New York Times wrote, "So long as it stays confined to the level of metaphor, as it does in the first hour of Wolf, this idea really is irresistible." Roger Ebert of the Chicago Sun-Times gave the movie three stars, and wrote, "Wolf is both more and less than a traditional werewolf movie. Less, because it doesn't provide the frankly vulgar thrills and excesses some audience members are going to be hoping for. And more, because Nicholson and his director, Mike Nichols, are halfway serious about exploring what might happen if a New York book editor did become a werewolf". Hal Hinson of The Washington Post wrote, "In its own delightfully peculiar way, the film is the only one of its kind ever made – a horror film about office politics [...] The movie isn't wholly great; it starts to unravel just after the midway point. Still, there are charms enough all the way through to make it the most seductive, most enjoyable film of the summer". Peter Travers of Rolling Stone called it "a rapturous romantic thriller with a darkly comic subtext about what kills human values".

Desson Howe of The Washington Post wrote that it "works beautifully when it's rooted in reality, when the Werewolf Thing functions as a multiple metaphor for unleashed-id sexuality and the law of the corporate jungle" Todd McCarthy of Variety wrote, "The studio must convince the horror/special-effects crowd to attend a Jack Nicholson/Michelle Pfeiffer/Mike Nichols picture and persuade the film-makers' fans to see a genre pic... But no matter how snazzy the trappings, when you get down to it, this is still, at heart, a werewolf picture". Time Out wrote, "Quite frankly, it's hard to fathom why exactly anyone would have wanted to make this slick, glossy, but utterly redundant werewolf movie... Overall, this is needlessly polished nonsense: not awful; just toothless, gutless and bloodless."

Audiences polled by CinemaScore gave the film an average grade of "B" on an A+ to F scale.

=== Year-end lists ===
- Honorable mention – Mike Clark, USA Today
- Honorable mention – Glenn Lovell, San Jose Mercury News
- Honorable mention – Howie Movshovitz, The Denver Post
- Honorable mention – Bob Carlton, The Birmingham News

=== Awards and nominations ===
Wolf won a Saturn Award for Best Writing for Jim Harrison and Wesley Strick's screenplay, and it was nominated for a further 5 Saturn Awards, in the categories of Best Horror Film, Best Actor (Jack Nicholson), Best Actress (Michelle Pfeiffer), Best Supporting Actor (James Spader) and Best Make-up (Rick Baker).

Ennio Morricone was nominated for the Grammy Award for Best Instrumental Composition Written for a Motion Picture or for Television.

Award	Category	Recipient(s)	Result
Grammy Awards	Best Instrumental Composition Written for a Motion Picture or Television	Ennio Morricone	Nominated
Saturn Awards	Best Horror Film	Wolf	Nominated
Saturn Awards	Best Actor	Jack Nicholson	Nominated
Saturn Awards	Best Actress	Michelle Pfeiffer	Nominated
Saturn Awards	Best Supporting Actor	James Spader	Nominated
Saturn Awards	Best Writing	Jim Harrison and Wesley Strick	Won
Saturn Awards	Best Make-up	Rick Baker	Nominated
