= Robin Coste Lewis =

American poet (born 1964)

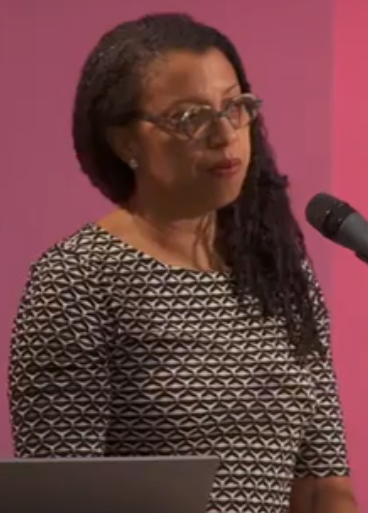
- Reading at the San Francisco Public Library in 2016
- Born: 1964 (age 61–62); Compton, California, U.S.
- Education: Hampshire College (BA); New York University (MFA); Harvard University (MTS); University of Southern California (PhD)
- Occupations: Writer, artist, professor
- Notable work: Voyage of the Sable Venus and Other Poems, To the Realization of Perfect Helplessness, Thirty-Four Illustrations of Dante's Inferno, Archive of Desire, Intimacy
- Awards: National Book Award for Poetry

Cover of US paperback edition of Voyage of the Sable Venus and Other Poems

Robin Coste Lewis (born 1964) is an American poet, artist, and scholar. Poet Laureate Emeritus of Los Angeles, Lewis's debut poetry collection, Voyage of the Sable Venus and Other Poems won the National Book Award for Poetry in 2015––the first time a poetry debut by an African-American had ever won the prize in the National Book Foundation's history, and the first time any debut had won the award since 1974. Critics called the collection "A masterpiece", "Surpassing imagination, maturity, and aesthetic dazzle", "remarkable hopefulness ... in the face of what would make most rage and/or collapse", "formally polished, emotionally raw, and wholly exquisite". Voyage of the Sable Venus was also a finalist for the LA Times Book Prize, the Hurston-Wright Award, and the California Book Award. The Paris Review, The New Yorker, The New York Times, Buzz Feed, and Entropy Magazine all named Voyage one of the best poetry collections of the year. Flavorwire named the collection one of the 10 must-read books about art. And Literary Hub named Voyage one of the "Most Important Books of the Last Twenty Years". In 2018, MoMA commissioned both Lewis and Kevin Young to write a series of poems to accompany Robert Rauschenberg's drawings in the book Thirty-Four Illustrations of Dante's Inferno (MoMA, 2018). Lewis is also the author of Inhabitants and Visitors, a chapbook published by Clockshop and the Huntington Library and Museum. Her photo-text collection, To the Realization of Perfect Helplessness, was published to great acclaim by Knopf in 2022. Awards included the PEN Award for Poetry, the NAACP Image Award for Outstanding Literary Work, and the California Book Award (finalist). Her fifth book, Archive of Desire, written in honor of Constantine P. Cavafy, is forthcoming by Knopf in 2025.

Lewis's writing has appeared in various journals and anthologies, such as Time magazine, The New Yorker, The New York Times, The Paris Review, Transition, and Best American Poetry. Lewis was also the poet laureate for the City of Los Angeles from 2017 to 2020. She is the recipient of many fellowships and awards, including the Joseph Brodsky Rome Prize from the American Academy in Rome, a Guggenheim Fellowship, a Ford Foundation "Art of Change" Fellowship, and a Cave Canem fellowship amongst others. In 2018, Lewis was named one of Los Angeles County's "Women of the Year". Other fellowships and awards include those from the Cave Canem Foundation, the Los Angeles Institute of the Humanities, the Caldera Foundation, the Ragdale Foundation, the Headlands Center for the Arts, and the Summer Literary Seminars in Kenya. Lewis was also a finalist for the International War Poetry Prize and the National Rita Dove Prize.

In addition to writing, Lewis is also an artist who works in film, sculpture, performance, textiles, and installation. Her most recent work, a single-channel video installation titled "Intimacy", was first exhibited at Gallerie Marian Goodman in Paris in collaboration with Julie Mehretu. The work was later installed at Marian Goodman Gallery NYC, as well as the 2024 Venice Biennale at the Palazzo Grassi in Julie Mehretu's "Ensemble" –– an exhibition that included works by David Hammonds, Tacita Dean, Jessica Rankin, Nairy Baghramian, and Paul Pfeiffer. Her text installations were exhibited at the Huntington Museum, the Underground Museum, and Hauser & Wirth NYC. Lewis regularly collaborates with other artists, including Glenn Ligon and Lorna Simpson. She also performs and tours a multi-media project titled "Archive of Desire" with composer and sound artist Vijay Iyer, master cellist Jeffrey Ziegler, and painter Julie Mehretu. Lewis is also a librettist whose historical operatic works she creates in collaboration with composer Paola Prestini.

== Biography ==
Lewis received her BA from Hampshire College in creative writing and comparative literature; a Masters of Theological Studies degree in Sanskrit and comparative religious literature from the Divinity School at Harvard University; an MFA in poetry at New York University; and a PhD from the University of Southern California"s Creative Writing and Literature Program, where she was a Provost Fellow in poetry and visual studies.

Lewis has taught on the faculty of Wheaton College, Hunter College, and Hampshire College. Currently, she teaches in NYU's low-residency MFA in Paris, and is a Professor of English in the PhD program in Creative Writing at USC. She lives in Los Angeles.

Born in Compton, California, her family is from New Orleans.

== Awards and honors ==
From 2017 to 2021, Coste Lewis was the Poet Laureate of Los Angeles. The following year, she earned the American Academy in Rome Prize, after which she was the Ford Foundation scholar in residence at the Museum of Modern Art.

Awards for Coste Lewis's writing
Year	Title	Award	Result	Ref.
2015	Voyage of the Sable Venus	National Book Award for Poetry	Winner	
2016	Voyage of the Sable Venus	Los Angeles Times Book Award for Poetry	Finalist	
2016	Voyage of the Sable Venus	Hurston/Wright Legacy Award	Finalist	
2023	To the Realization of Perfect Helplessness	PEN/Voelcker Award for Poetry	Winner	
2023	To the Realization of Perfect Helplessness	Hurston/Wright Legacy Award	Nominee	

== Bibliography ==
- Voyage of the Sable Venus: And Other Poems. New York: Alfred A. Knopf, 2015. ISBN 9781101875438
- To the Realization of Perfect Helplessness. New York: Alfred A. Knopf, 2022. ISBN 9781524732585
