= Anthony Cody =

American poet, editor, and educator

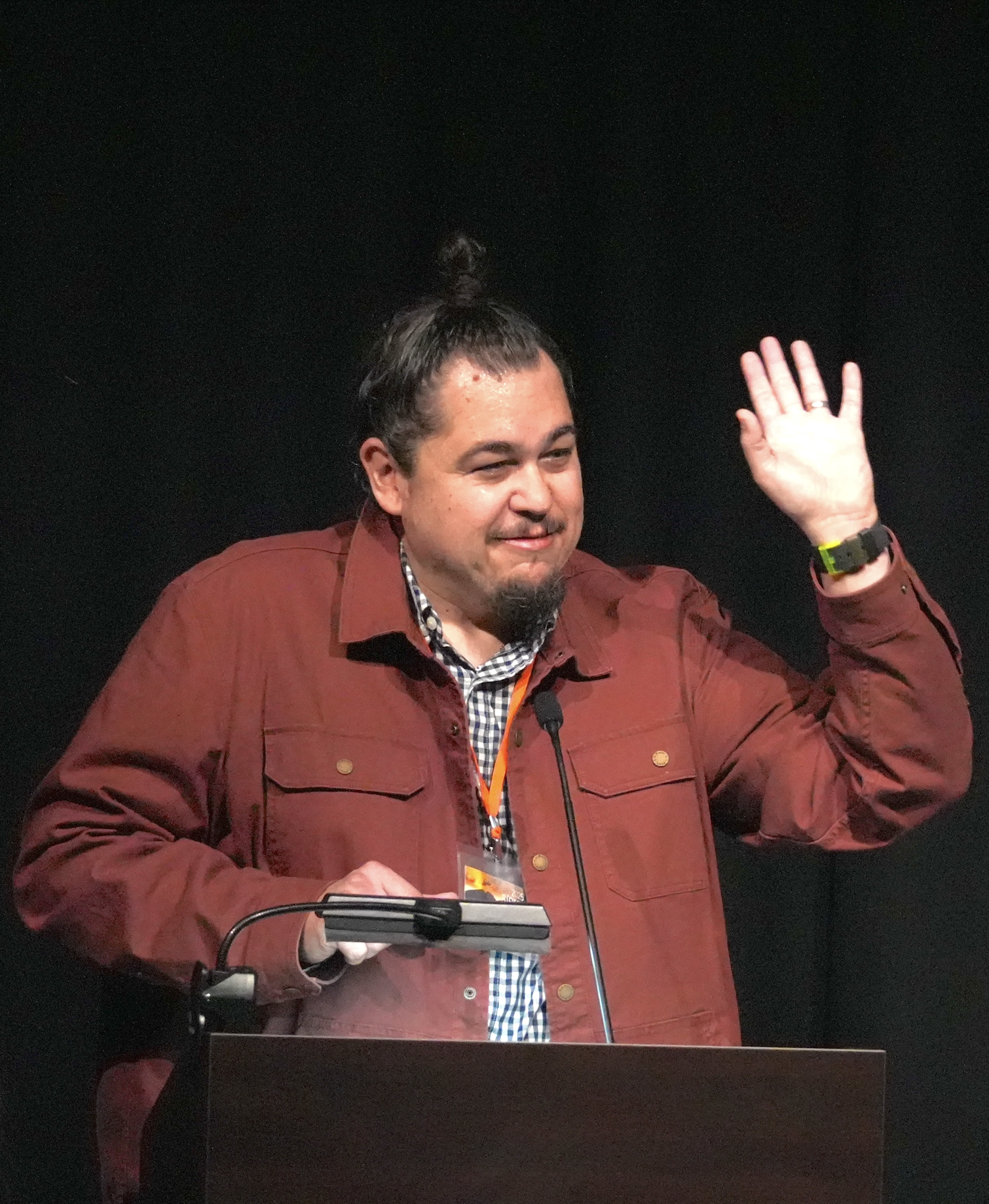
- Cody at the Sierra Poetry Festival in 2025
- Born: Fresno, California, U.S.
- Education: California State University, Fresno (MFA)
- Occupations: Poet, editor, educator
- Writing career
- Language: English
- Genre: Poetry
- Notable works: Borderland Apocrypha (2020); The Rendering (2023)
- Notable awards: Finalist, National Book Award for Poetry (2020); American Book Award (2021); Whiting Award (2022)

Anthony Cody is an American poet, editor, and educator from Fresno, California. He is the author of Borderland Apocrypha (2020) and The Rendering (2023). Borderland Apocrypha won the 2021 American Book Award and the 2020 Southwest Book Award, and was a finalist for the 2020 National Book Award for Poetry, the 2021 PEN/Jean Stein Book Award, and the Los Angeles Times Book Prize for Poetry. Cody received a Whiting Award in 2022.

== Early life and education ==
Cody grew up in Fresno, California. Biographical notes published by the Academy of American Poets and the Poetry Foundation describe his family lineage as connected to the Bracero Program and the Dust Bowl; a 2024 profile by Fresno Pacific University described him as having Irish and Mexican ancestry. He earned an MFA in creative writing from California State University, Fresno.

== Career ==
Cody's debut full-length collection, Borderland Apocrypha, won Omnidawn's 2018 Open Book Prize and was published in 2020. The book addresses anti-Mexican violence, detention, and erasure in the borderlands after the 1848 Treaty of Guadalupe Hidalgo, and does so through documentary, visual, and conceptual forms. Reviewing the collection, Stephanie Burt emphasized its political and conceptual qualities, while Emily Pérez described it as "visual, conceptual, and genre-defying." Borderland Apocrypha was later a finalist for the National Book Award and PEN/Jean Stein Book Award, and won the American Book Award and Southwest Book Award.

In 2022, he received a Whiting Award.

Cody's second collection, The Rendering, was published by Omnidawn in 2023. Critics described the book as a continuation of his archival and formally experimental practice, turning to the history of the Dust Bowl, climate crisis, and the Anthropocene.

Beyond his own collections, Cody coedited How Do I Begin?: A Hmong American Literary Anthology and coedited and co-translated Juan Felipe Herrera's Akrílica. He has collaborated with Juan Felipe Herrera's Laureate Lab Visual Wordist Studio, served as co-publisher of Noemi Press and poetry editor for Omnidawn, and taught in the low-residency MFA program at Randolph College.

== Bibliography ==
=== Poetry collections ===
- Borderland Apocrypha (Omnidawn, 2020; ISBN 978-1-63243-076-2)
- The Rendering (Omnidawn, 2023; ISBN 978-1-63243-114-1; OCLC 1353289743)

=== Edited and translated books ===
- How Do I Begin?: A Hmong American Literary Anthology (coeditor, Heyday, 2011)
- Akrílica by Juan Felipe Herrera (coeditor and co-translator of the 2022 edition, Noemi Press)

== Awards and honors ==
- 2018 Omnidawn Open Book Prize, for Borderland Apocrypha
- 2020 Southwest Book Award
- Finalist, 2020 National Book Award for Poetry
- Finalist, 2021 PEN/Jean Stein Book Award
- 2021 American Book Award
- 2022 Whiting Award
