= Greg Keeler =

American singer-songwriter

Greg Keeler is a Montana songwriter, poet, writer, artist, humorist, and professor. He also plays the guitar, harmonica, and kazoo. Keeler was born in the flatlands of Oklahoma with his one brother. Keeler was a professor at Montana State University where he taught creative writing and contemporary literature. Keeler started teaching at Montana State University in 1975. He graduated with a master's degree from Oklahoma State University and later went on to earn his D.A. from Idaho State University. He has published three books, written collections of poetry, has produced six plays, recorded ten tapes and CDs, and has published many articles in magazines and journals. His paintings have gone up for display in exhibits at MSU and in Butte. Keeler is the father of two sons and is married to Judy Keeler, a retired adjunct professor of English at MSU.

== Biography ==
Keeler was born and raised in the flatlands of Oklahoma. He was born into a household of professors. His father was an English professor at Oklahoma State University, where he wrote poems and essays. His mother was a professor of Child Development and Family Relations at Oklahoma State University–Stillwater. His brother is a professor of economics at University of California Berkeley.

At a very young age, he was inspired by his family to sing, paint, and write, which he believes is the reason he still loves these things today. Entertaining others was something he derived joy from, which he often did as a child.

He grew up fishing with his father and has fond memories of fishing Long Lake, Minn. and has loved fishing his entire life. As a kid, he wanted to grow up and be a fisherman. He considers fishing more than just a sport, but a way of life. To him, fishing is not about the fish you catch but the fact that fishing itself is so beautiful and needs to be fun. He loves the mountains and fishing, so when he was teaching in Louisiana and saw a job opening as an English professor at Montana State University, he was eager to jump on the boat. In 1975, he was hired as a temporary Professor of English at MSU, where he met his wife, Judy Keeler. After two years, his job was under academic review, as he was not publishing his works in professional journals. After hiring a lawyer, he got to keep his job at MSU. It was hard for him to make a living on an English professor's paycheck, so he would buck bales for some extra money during the summer. This inspired him to write satirical songs and poems about the hay fields, which either made the people he worked with in the fields angry or laugh. He wrote poems daily for a while. Some days, Keeler can be found writing hysterical poems; on others, he can be caught painting. Keeler's focus is never on just one thing; he applies his talents equally.

His love of writing has gained him honors and awards. In 1998, he received the Charles and Nora L. Wiley Award. This award is given to a faculty member of MSU for their research and creativity. In 2001, he received the Governor's Award in Humanities. Today, Keeler is constantly being looked up to by members of the college and his community. Sara Jayne Steen, head of the English Department at MSU, said, "…Greg is one of the true lights at Montana State University." His work is also nationally recognized on PBS, and his songs are being used nationally and internationally through documentaries.

== Music Album Titles ==
- Bad Science Fiction (1987)
- Song of Fishing Sheep and Guns in Montana (1987)
- Post-Modern Blues (1988)
- Trash Fish (1994)
- Sheep, Lies, and Audio Tape (1991)
- Enquiring Minds (1990)
- All You Can Eat (1992)
- Talking Sweet Bye and Bye (1987)
- Montana in Time (1989)
- Nuclear Dioxin Queen (Compilation of songs from different tapes)

== Books ==
- American Falls (Confluence Press, 1987)
- Epiphany at Goofy’s Gas (Clark City 1991)
- A Mirror to the Safe (Limberlost Press, 1997)
- Waltzing With the Captain (Limberlost Press, 2004)
- Trash Fish: A Life (Counterpoint, 2008)
- The Bluebird Run (Elk River Books, 2018)

== Published Poetry ==
- American Falls (1991)
- Epiphany at Goofy’s Gas (1991)
- Published Fishing Articles
- Stink Meat
- Extreme
- Boat Blunders
- Fishing in the Wind
- A Democracy of Anglers
- Lost Fish
