= With My Back to the World =

2024 poetry collection by Victoria Chang

- Author: Victoria Chang
- Genre: Poetry, ekphrastic poetry, prose poetry, experimental poetry
- Publisher: Farrar, Straus and Giroux
- Publication date: April 2, 2024
- Pages: 112
- Awards: Forward Prize for Best Collection
- ISBN: 978-0374611132
- Preceded by: The Trees Witness Everything

With My Back to the World is a 2024 poetry collection by American poet Victoria Chang, published by Farrar, Straus and Giroux. Many of the poems, including the one for which the book is named, are titled after works of art by American painter Agnes Martin. The book won the Forward Prize for Best Collection.

== Content ==
Chang conceived of the book after the Museum of Modern Art commissioned her to write a poem about a work of art which the museum featured. Chang chose On a Clear Day by Martin, which is included in the book, and decided to base a whole poetry collection of Martin's work henceforth. In observing Chang's relationship to Martin's work, World Literature Today compared Chang's conceit with Fred Moten's idea of ekphrastic translation, in which an ekphrastic work seeks to reach the essence of its point of inspiration rather than superficially mimicking the original work itself. Many of the book's poems were also arranged in juxtaposition with visual media, such as early drafts and images, in the style of On Kawara, while others involve the form of erasure poetry and prose poetry.

The poems themselves span themes of language, loneliness, depression, Asian American womanhood, and current events such as the 2021 Atlanta spa shootings. Several of the poems have appeared in other publications. "Night Sea, 1963" appeared in The New Yorker. "Drift of Summer, 1965", "Friendship, 1963", and "On a Clear Day" appeared in The Atlantic. "Play, 1966" appeared in Los Angeles Times and The New Republic. "Grass, 1967" appeared in The Bitter Southerner and Poets.org. "Untitled IX, 1982" appeared in Guernica.

== Critical reception ==
In a starred review, Publishers Weekly wrote that "These elegiac poems thoughtfully balance the head and the heart."

World Literature Today called the book "psychologically astute and generous in its focused attention on the work of another artist." The Harvard Review wrote that "The book brims with questions and conjecture, and Chang invites readers to query depression, grief, and the purpose of art." The Asian Review of Books called it "Introspective, complex and experimental" and said the poems "reveal vulnerability and emotional honesty found in the creative process of making art and of poetry."

Isaac Fitzgerald, in an April 2024 list for Today, called the book a best read for National Poetry Month.
