= Obit (book) =

Book by Victoria Chang

- Author: Victoria Chang
- Language: English
- Genre: Literary poetry
- Publisher: Copper Canyon Press
- Publication date: April 7, 2020
- Publication place: United States
- Media type: Print
- Pages: 113 pp.
- ISBN: 9781556595745 (paperback 1st ed.)
- OCLC: 1119480837
- Dewey Decimal: 813
- LC Class: PS3603.H3575 O25 2020

Obit is the fifth book of poems written by Victoria Chang.

== Awards ==
=== Prizes ===
- Los Angeles Times Book Prize for Poetry in 2020
- Anisfield-Wolf Book Award for Poetry, 2021
- Griffin Poetry Prize International runner-up, 2021
- PEN/Voelcker Award for Poetry in 2021

=== Honors ===
- New York Times 100 Notable Books
- Time's List of the 100 Best Novels
- Best Book of the Year by NPR
- Best Book of 2021 by The Boston Globe
