= Elliott Lester =

British film and television director

- Occupations: Film director, music video director, television director
- Years active: 2006 – present

Elliott Lester is a British film and television director best known for directing the film Blitz. He began his career directing music videos, before making his film debut in 2006 with Love Is the Drug.

== Career ==
Lester made his feature film directing debut in 2006 with a drama film Love Is the Drug. In 2011, he directed the crime thriller Blitz from a script by Nathan Parker, starring Jason Statham and Paddy Considine.

In 2014, Lester directed the HBO's drama film Nightingale, starring David Oyelowo.

Lester has also directed a drama thriller film, titled 478 from a script by Javier Gullón, which starred Arnold Schwarzenegger. The film was released in 2017 retitled Aftermath.

== Filmography ==
- 2006: Love Is the Drug
- 2011: Blitz
- 2014: Nightingale
- 2017: Sleepwalker
- 2017: Aftermath
- 2024: The Thicket

== Music videos ==
- 2003: "Why Not" by Hilary Duff
- 2004: "With You" by Jessica Simpson
- 2005: "Over My Head (Cable Car)" by The Fray
- 2007: "Nobody Do It Better" by Keith Murray featuring Tyrese and Junior
- 2008: "A Beautiful Lie" by Thirty Seconds to Mars (co-directed by Jared Leto)
- 2008: "Tell Me Something I Don't Know" by Selena Gomez
- 2018: "Head Above Water" by Avril Lavigne
- 2019: "I Fell in Love with the Devil" by Avril Lavigne
