= Love Is the Drug (film) =

2006 film by Elliott Lester

- Theatrical release poster
- Directed by: Elliott Lester
- Written by: Steve Allison; Wesley Strick
- Produced by: Jed Nolan
- Starring: John Patrick Amedori; Lizzy Caplan; Daryl Hannah; D.J. Cotrona
- Cinematography: Florian Stadler
- Edited by: Steve Rees
- Production companies: Box Office Productions; Alpine Pictures
- Distributed by: Alpine Pictures
- Release date: October 6, 2006
- Running time: 96 minutes
- Country: United States
- Language: English

Love Is the Drug (also known as Addicted to Her Love) is a 2006 American drama film produced by Box Office Productions and Alpine Pictures. Directed by Elliott Lester, it was filmed in Los Angeles, California. It was previewed at the Slamdance Film Festival in January 2006 before being released theatrically on a limited basis in Seattle, Washington, on October 6, 2006. Starring John Patrick Amedori, Lizzy Caplan, and D.J. Cotrona, the film tells the story of a social outcast who becomes obsessed with a pretty wealthy girl and begins stealing drugs for her friends to be near her. It received mixed reviews from critics.

== Plot ==
Jonah Brand (John Patrick Amedori) is a scholarship student at a private school full of wealthy students. Poor and lacking the social confidence of his classmates, at graduation he finds himself attracted to Sara Weller (Lizzy Caplan), who is part of a close-knit quartet of drug users that includes her boyfriend Troy (Jonathon Trent) and their friends Lucas (D.J. Cotrona) and Erin (Jenny Wade). Sara returns his interest but the rest of her group discourage Jonah's attention. However, after the group learn that he works part-time at a pharmacy doing delivery, they bring them into his world for the summer, in exchange for his stealing prescription drugs for them. Jonah's mother, Sandra (Daryl Hannah), is too busy working multiple jobs to try to keep up appearances, to try to deal with her son's sudden change in behavior. As the group gets more experimental with their drugs of choice, Jonah unravels as he becomes more and more obsessed with Sara.

After Troy dies under questionable circumstances, his parents hire private investigator Phil Hackwith (Bruce A. Young) to try to find out the truth. The investigator questions all four of the teens with little results. A few days later, Sara comes to visit Jonah at work, stating that she feels empty and doesn't know why she's there. Jonah asks her to come away to Tijuana with him for the weekend, she agrees. The next morning, the private investigator watches from his parked car as they pull out of the driveway together. They proceed to drink much tequila and drunkenly kiss in the hotel room, which leads to sex, during which Sara asks Jonah to stop and he does not. Afterwards, she is clearly distraught and demands to be taken home. They return to California that evening.

The next day at work, Lucas storms in and informs Jonah's boss that Jonah has been stealing pills and selling them. Jonah is not able to deny this and is subsequently fired. He shows up in Sara's backyard uninvited later that night, ignoring her requests that he leave, and confesses that he was the one who bought the drugs for Troy. He asks her if she will run away to Mexico with him, saying he'll rob the pharmacy for pills and money. She says "okay", primarily to get him the hell out of her backyard. On the day they are scheduled to depart. Jonah loses his temper and physically abuses his mother. He later meets Sara in the bathroom of Lucas' house. He tries to convince her that she has feelings for him; she doesn't. Jonah attempts to give her drugs but she is reluctant to taking them. During this time the private investigator comes to Lucas' house and asks for Sara. Erin goes looking for her. After realizing that Sara will never love him, Jonah commits suicide by stabbing himself with a pair of scissors. The film is ended with Lucas, Erin, and the private investigator walking into the bathroom and seeing Jonah's dead body with Sara frightened in the corner.

== Release ==
Love Is the Drug debuted as an entry in the January 2006 Slamdance Film Festival. It was given a limited theatrical release in Seattle, Washington, on October 6, 2006. It was released to Region 4 DVD in Australia.

== Reception ==
Love Is the Drug holds a rating of 60% and an average rating of 5.2 out of 10 on the film aggregate site Rotten Tomatoes, based on reviews from five critics. Variety's Justin Chang called the film "darkly compelling" and a "smartly acted and strikingly confident feature", he praised the cinematography and screenplay. He also praised Caplan's performance as Sara and felt Cotrona was "explosively charismatic", but he criticized the film's ending as "repetitive and overwrought" and found that the final moments "played like a cheap stunt". While Seattle Times reviewer Ted Fry praised the film as a "small, earnest and generally well-acted movie [that] infuses a horrifying sense of realism in the sexual and drug-fueled behavior of kids who believe they are mature beyond their years", he also criticized the characters as being hard to identify or sympathize with and found Johah's eventual actions to be "unpleasantly erratic". Soren Andersen of The News Tribune panned the film, feeling the characters were sympathetic. In particular, he felt Sara was "vapid" and Lucas a "Robert Downey Jr. doppelgänger" and "heartlessly manipulative substance abuser". The Seattle Post-Intelligencer's Bill White gave the film a grade of D on an A+ to F scale and stated that Lester "aim[ed] for an edgy teen melodrama and finishe[d] with something less than a spineless horror flick". In particular, he felt the ending was "as predictable as it is improbable" and stated that it seemed like "an alternate ending to Beyond the Valley of the Dolls shot by the gaffers during a meal break".
