= American Sonnets for My Past and Future Assassin =

2018 poetry collection by Terrance Hayes

First edition (publ. Penguin Books)

American Sonnets for My Past and Future Assassin is a 2018 collection of more than seventy sonnets by Terrance Hayes. Written after the 2016 American elections, this collection treats topics like racism, masculinity, and politics. It was a finalist for the 2018 National Book Award for poetry, and was shortlisted for the T. S. Eliot Prize for 2018.

== Title and theme ==
The title of the collection, "American Sonnets for My Past and Future Assassin" (singularized to “American Sonnet”) is also the title of each poem in the book. Each sonnet addresses contemporary issues of American society and its politics. Following the 2016 U.S election, Hayes decided to write a series of political poems many of which directly addresses Donald Trump. This is done through a combination of literary techniques including allusions and metaphors. In some poems he uses the phrase, "Mister Trumpet" as a play on his name.

The collection was inspired by Wanda Coleman's series of "American Sonnets" In the sonnets Hayes deplores the rising violence related to racism in America. He raises some old themes in American literature like the cage of masculinity or the relationship between father and son in passages like: “Christianity is a religion built around a father/Who does not rescue his son. It is the story/of a son whose father is a ghost."

== Critical reception ==
Spencer Hupp of The Sewanee Review sees the collection as a reminder of American suffering, because of racial violence but with hope for a better future: "If this book’s 1,148 uneven but often stunning lines prove anything, it’s that the threat of hate, the hope for personal redemption, and the possibility for reconciliation can be as much alive in art as they are in the culture that creates it."
