= Songs of Unreason =

2011 poetry collection

- Author: Jim Harrison
- Language: English
- Genre: Poetry
- Publisher: Copper Canyon Press
- Publication date: 2011
- Publication place: United States
- Media type: Print (hardback & paperback)
- ISBN: 9781556593895
- Preceded by: In Search of Small Gods
- Followed by: Dead Man's Float

Songs of Unreason is a collection of poems by American writer Jim Harrison published in 2011 by Copper Canyon Press. It was Harrison's 13th and penultimate collection. 67 poems make up the collection, including "Suite of Unreason", a poem of over 350 lines, and a sequence of seven poems relating to rivers ("River I - VII"). Many of the poems are concerned with the transcendent natural world.

The collection won the High Plains Book Award for Poetry in 2012.

== Themes ==
=== Dogs and birds ===
Non-human creatures, especially dogs and birds, figure prominently in the poems. For example, in "Mary the Drug Addict" (about a dog named Mary), the poet speaks of the ability to communicate with his dog.

... we speak a bone-deep language without
nouns and verbs, a creature-language skin to skin.

In the poem "Prado," which references dogs, birds and fish, the poet talks about the healing power of a relationship with animals:

I was lucky that early on the birds and fish
disarmed me and the monster in my soul fled.

In "Chatter," the poet discusses his non-human nature:

I'm part blackbird and part red squirrel
and my brain chatters, shrieks, and whistles
but outside it tends to get real quiet

=== Death ===
A number of poems evaluate death: how we think about it, how we remember it, and how it affects us. In “Sister,” Harrison remembers a sister who died long ago:

Maybe you drifted upward as an ancient
bird hoping to nest on the moon.

In "River IV", the poet considers aging and death:

....At my age
death stalks me but I don't mind. This is to be
expected but how can I deal with the unpardonable
crime of loneliness?...

The final poem, "Death Again", states:

Let's not get romantic or dismal about death.
Indeed it's our most unique act along with birth.
We must think of it as cooking breakfast,
it's that ordinary....

== Poems ==
Consisting of 67 short stanzas and over three hundred lines, "Suite of Unreason" is the longest poem in the collection. In the first edition, the stanzas of this poem are individually printed on unnumbered left-hand pages, opposite longer, stand-alone poems on the facing right-hand pages.

Harrison prefaced the poem as follows: "Nearly all my life I've noted that some of my thinking was atavistic, primitive, totemic. This can be disturbing to one fairly learned. In this suite I wanted to examine this phenomenon."

The poem can be read as a series of short, haiku-like, meditations. The first stanza of the poem is a good example:

The moon is under suspicion.
Of what use is it?
It exudes its white smoke of light.

=== List ===
The poems are numbered in the order they appear in the first edition of the collection.

1. Broom
2. Suite of Unreason
3. Notations
4. American Sermon
5. Arts
6. Bird's-Eye View
7. Poet Warning
8. A Part of My History
9. Muse in Our Time
10. Muse II
11. Poet at Nineteen in NYC
12. Sister
13. Skull
14. Horses
15. René Char
16. Xmas Cheeseburgers
17. Mary the Drug Addict
18. Night Creatures
19. Deaf Dog's Bark
20. June the Horse
21. Poet No. 7
22. Puzzle
23. Rumination
24. Dan's Bugs
25. Invisible
26. Mary
27. Remote Friends
28. Poet Science
29. Ache
30. Oriole
31. Blue Shawl
32. River I
33. River II
34. River III
35. River IV
36. River V
37. River VI
38. River VII
39. Spring
40. Sky
41. March in Patagonia, AZ
42. Brazil
43. Grand Marais
44. Desert Snow
45. Reality
46. She
47. Love
48. Back into Memory
49. Debtors
50. Prisoners
51. Corruption
52. Our Anniversary
53. Doors
54. Greed
55. Cereal
56. D.B.
57. Sunlight
58. Brutish
59. Nightfears
60. Blue
61. The Current Poor
62. Moping
63. Church
64. Chatter
65. Return
66. Prado
67. Death Again

=== Poems appearing elsewhere ===
- "Blue" and "René Char II" (named after the French poet René Char) were included in New Poets of the American West.
- "A Puzzle", "She", and "Love" appeared in the Fall 2010 issue of the literary magazine Narrative.
- "Suite of Unreason" appeared in the Spring 2011 issue of Narrative.
- "Sunlight" was published in the Fall 2011 issue of Reflections (Yale Divinity School).
- "American Sermon" appeared in the Spring 2017 issue of Reflections (Yale Divinity School).
