= Victoria Chang =

American poet, writer, editor, and professor

- Chang at Shanghai Book Fair 2025
- Born: Detroit, Michigan, U.S.
- Education: University of Michigan (BA); Harvard University (MA); Stanford University (MBA); Warren Wilson College (MFA)
- Occupations: Poet; writer; editor; professor
- Website: victoriachangpoet.com

Victoria Chang is an American poet, writer, editor, and professor. Her books include the poetry collections Circle (2005), Salvinia Molesta (2008), The Boss (2013), Barbie Chang (2017), Obit (2020), The Trees Witness Everything (2022), and With My Back to the World (2024) and Tree of Knowledge. She is also the author of the nonfiction book Dear Memory: Letters on Writing, Silence, and Grief (2021) as well as children's books.

Obit received the Los Angeles Times Book Prize, the Anisfield-Wolf Book Award in Poetry, and the PEN/Voelcker Award, and was longlisted for the National Book Award for Poetry. With My Back to the World received the 2024 Forward Prize for Best Collection. Chang is the Margaret T. and Henry C. Bourne Chair in Poetry at Georgia Tech and director of Poetry@Tech.

== Early life and education ==
Chang was born in Detroit and grew up in West Bloomfield, Michigan. In a 2021 profile of Dear Memory, The New Yorker described her family history as including her grandparents on her mother’s side fleeing from mainland China to Taiwan and her parents' later moving from Taiwan to Michigan.

Chang earned a B.A. from the University of Michigan, an M.A. in East Asian studies from Harvard University, an M.B.A. from Stanford University, and an M.F.A. in creative writing from Warren Wilson College.

== Career ==
=== Poetry ===
Chang's first poetry collection, Circle, was published by Southern Illinois University Press in 2005 as part of the Crab Orchard Series in Poetry. Her second collection, Salvinia Molesta, was published by the University of Georgia Press in 2008. The Boss, her third collection, was published by McSweeney's in 2013 and received the 2014 PEN USA Award for Poetry.

Chang's fourth poetry collection, Barbie Chang, was published by Copper Canyon Press in 2017. Copper Canyon also published Chang's fifth collection, Obit, in 2020. The collection uses obituary forms to write about grief, family, memory, and loss. Obit was longlisted for the 2020 National Book Award for Poetry, shortlisted for the 2021 Griffin International Poetry Prize, and named a finalist for the National Book Critics Circle Award in poetry. It also received the Los Angeles Times Book Prize, the Anisfield-Wolf Book Award in Poetry, and the PEN/Voelcker Award.

In 2022, Copper Canyon published The Trees Witness Everything. The collection is largely composed in Japanese syllabic forms called waka. The Trees Witness Everything was named one of the best books of 2022 by The New Yorker and The Guardian.

With My Back to the World was published by Farrar, Straus and Giroux in 2024. The collection is inspired by the paintings and writings of Agnes Martin. It received the 2024 Forward Prize for Best Collection and was a finalist for the 2025 PEN/Jean Stein Book Award, the 2025 Kingsley Tufts Poetry Award, and the 2025 California Book Award. Tree of Knowledge was published in 2026 by Farrar, Straus & Giroux and called one of the best books of 2026 by The Telegraph

=== Prose, editing, and children's books ===
In 2004, Chang edited Asian American Poetry: The Next Generation, published by the University of Illinois Press. The anthology includes work by Asian American poets under the age of forty and was published with a foreword by Marilyn Chin.

Chang's nonfiction book Dear Memory: Letters on Writing, Silence, and Grief was published by Milkweed Editions in 2021. Writing in The New Yorker, Kamran Javadizadeh described the book as a collection of letters addressed to the dead, the living, family members, teachers, and the reader.

Chang has written books for children and young readers. Is Mommy?, a picture book illustrated by Marla Frazee, was published by Beach Lane Books in 2015. Her middle-grade novel in verse Love, Love was published by Sterling Children's Books in 2020. Eureka, a novel in verse for young readers, was published by Farrar, Straus and Giroux Books for Young Readers in 2026.

Chang is a former poetry editor of The New York Times Magazine. She was a Poem-a-Day guest editor in May 2019.

=== Academic work ===
Chang is the Margaret T. and Henry C. Bourne Chair in Poetry at Georgia Tech, where she directs Poetry@Tech, Georgia Tech’s poetry center.

== Honors and awards ==
- Circle, Association for Asian American Studies Book Award
- 2014: The Boss, PEN USA Award for Poetry
- 2014: The Boss, California Book Award
- 2017: Guggenheim Fellowship
- 2020: Obit, longlisted for the National Book Award for Poetry
- 2020: Obit, finalist for the National Book Critics Circle Award in poetry
- 2021: Obit, Los Angeles Times Book Prize
- 2021: Obit, Anisfield-Wolf Book Award in Poetry
- 2021: Obit, PEN/Voelcker Award for Poetry
- 2021: Obit, shortlisted for the Griffin International Poetry Prize
- 2023: Chowdhury Prize in Literature
- 2024: With My Back to the World, Forward Prize for Best Collection
- 2025: With My Back to the World, finalist for the PEN/Jean Stein Book Award
- 2025: With My Back to the World, finalist for the Kingsley Tufts Poetry Award
- 2025: With My Back to the World, finalist for the California Book Award
- 2025: National Endowment for the Arts Creative Writing Fellowship in Poetry
- 2026: Tree of Knowledge, finalist for the National Book Award in Poetry

== Selected works ==
=== Poetry collections ===
- Chang, Victoria (2005). Circle. Southern Illinois University Press. ISBN 9780809326181.
- Chang, Victoria (2008). Salvinia Molesta. University of Georgia Press. ISBN 9780820331768.
- Chang, Victoria (2013). The Boss. McSweeney's Poetry Series. ISBN 9781938073359.
- Chang, Victoria (2017). Barbie Chang. Copper Canyon Press. ISBN 9781556595165.
- Chang, Victoria (2020). Obit. Copper Canyon Press. ISBN 9781556595745.
- Chang, Victoria (2022). The Trees Witness Everything. Copper Canyon Press. ISBN 9781556596322.
- Chang, Victoria (2024). With My Back to the World. Farrar, Straus and Giroux. ISBN 9780374611132.
- Chang, Victoria (2026). Tree of Knowledge. Farrar, Straus and Giroux. ISBN 9780374614379.

=== Prose ===
- Chang, Victoria (2021). Dear Memory: Letters on Writing, Silence, and Grief. Milkweed Editions. ISBN 9781571313928.

=== Books for young readers ===
- Chang, Victoria (2015). Is Mommy?. Illustrated by Marla Frazee. Beach Lane Books. ISBN 9781481402927.
- Chang, Victoria (2020). Love, Love. Sterling Children's Books.
- Chang, Victoria (2026). Eureka. Farrar, Straus and Giroux Books for Young Readers. ISBN 9780374393540.

=== Edited ===
- Chang, Victoria M., ed. (2004). Asian American Poetry: The Next Generation. University of Illinois Press. ISBN 9780252071744.
