= Terrance Hayes =

American poet and educator (born 1971)

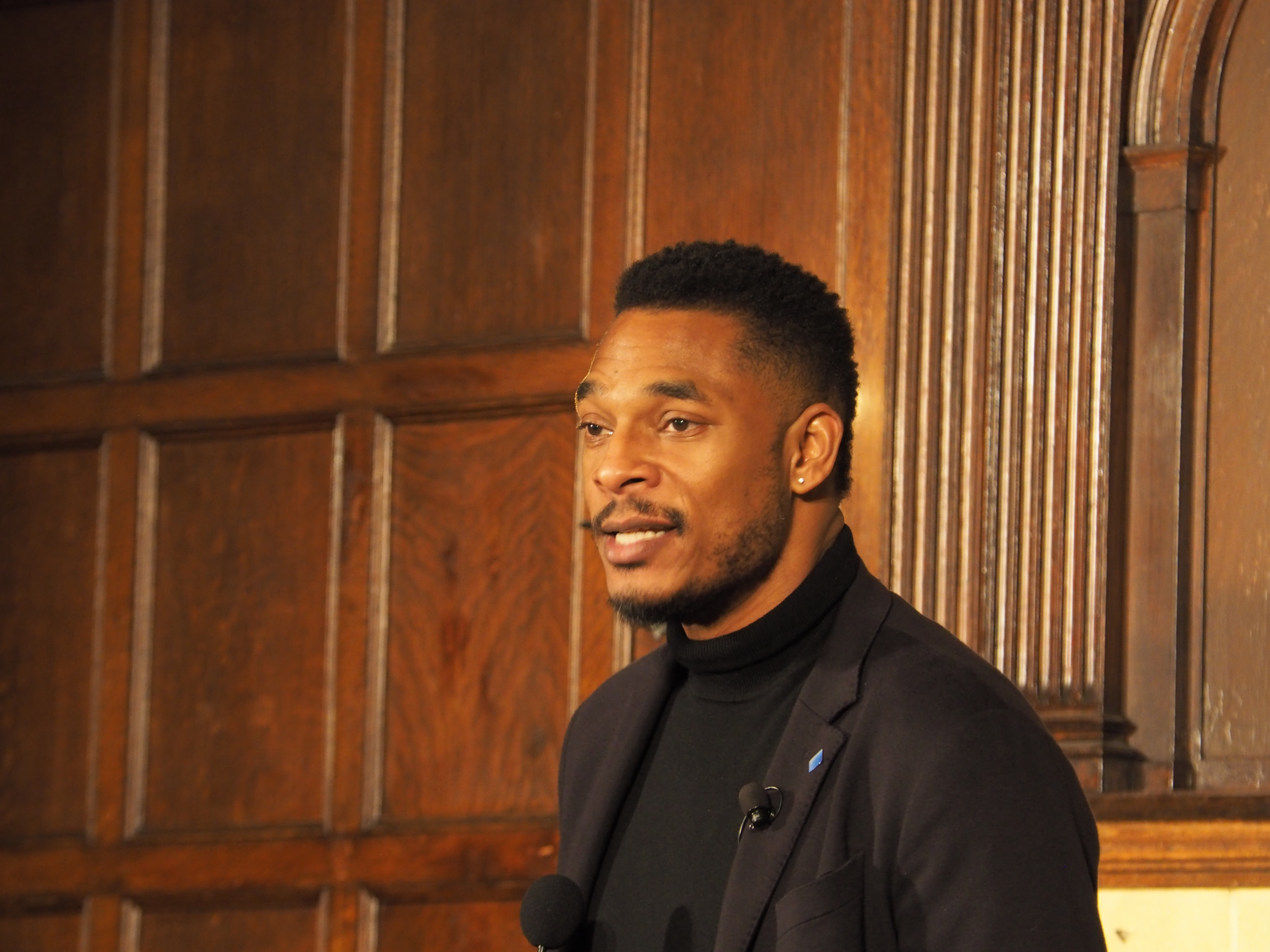
- Hayes reading at the Lannan Center 2020
- Born: November 18, 1971 (age 54); Columbia, South Carolina, U.S.
- Education: Coker University (B.A.); University of Pittsburgh (M.F.A.)
- Occupations: Poet and professor
- Spouse: Yona Harvey (divorced)
- Writing career
- Genre: Poetry
- Notable awards: National Book Award for Poetry; MacArthur Fellowship
- Website: terrancehayes.com

Terrance Hayes (born November 18, 1971) is an American poet and educator who has published seven poetry collections. His 2010 collection, Lighthead, won the National Book Award for Poetry in 2010. In 2014, he received a MacArthur Fellowship.

He was a professor of creative writing at Carnegie Mellon University until 2013, then taught in the English Department at the University of Pittsburgh. Currently, he teaches at New York University.

== Life and education ==
Hayes was born in Columbia, South Carolina on November 18, 1971. Studying English and painting, and also playing basketball and earning Academic All-American honors, he received a B.A. from Coker University. While at Coker, he had a professor contact Maya Angelou to help convince Hayes to pursue creative writing. He received an M.F.A. from the University of Pittsburgh writing program in 1997. After graduate school, he lived in Japan, Ohio, and New Orleans.

== Career ==
=== 1999-2013 ===
From 1999 to 2001, he taught at Xavier University of Louisiana, and in 2001 he became a creative writing professor at Carnegie Mellon University.

Hayes's first book of poetry, Muscular Music (1999), won both a Whiting Award and the Kate Tufts Discovery Award. His second collection, Hip Logic (2002), won the National Poetry Series, was a finalist for the Los Angeles Times Book Award, and runner-up for the James Laughlin Award from the Academy of American Poets. He won the National Book Award for Lighthead (in which he invented the "golden shovel" poetic form), in 2010.

By 2009, Hayes' poems had appeared in literary journals and magazines including The New Yorker, The American Poetry Review, Ploughshares, Fence, The Kenyon Review, Jubilat, Harvard Review, West Branch, Poetry, and The Adroit Journal. In praising Hayes's work, Cornelius Eady has said: "First you'll marvel at his skill, his near-perfect pitch, his disarming humor, his brilliant turns of phrase. Then you'll notice the grace, the tenderness, the unblinking truth-telling just beneath his lines, the open and generous way he takes in our world." As of 2014, all his books featured his artwork.

He was a professor of Creative Writing at Carnegie Mellon University until 2013, at which time he joined the faculty at the English Department at the University of Pittsburgh.

=== 2014-present ===
As of 2014, he was a member of the University of Pittsburgh's English faculty. Hayes, Yona Harvey, and Dawn Lundy Martin founded the Center for African-American Poetry and Poetics at the university. In September 2014, he was honored as one of the 21 2014 fellows of the John D. and Catherine T. MacArthur Foundation, awarded to individuals who show outstanding creativity in their work.

In January 2017, Hayes was elected a Chancellor of the Academy of American Poets. In June 2017, he was named The New York Times Magazine poetry editor, the third person to have the role. He held the role in 2017 and 2018. In 2018, his essay To Float in the Space Between won the 2019 Pegasus Award in Poetry Criticism.

In 2018, Hayes premiered Cycles of My Being, which had been commissioned by the Opera Philadelphia, Lyric Opera of Chicago, and Carnegie Hall. With music by Tyshawn Sorey and starring Lawrence Brownlee, the song cycles center on what it means to be a Black man living in America today. In 2020, the song cycle was made into a film by the Opera Philadelphia and released on their digital channel. The poetry was from Hayes' book American Sonnets for My Past and Future Assassin. In 2019, he won a Hurston/Wright Legacy Award for his poetry collection American Sonnets for My Past and Future Assassin. In 2020, he was awarded the Rebekah Johnson Bobbitt National Prize for Poetry from the Library of Congress.

In 2022, he was elected to the American Academy of Arts and Letters.

In January 2022, he was one of several interim poetry editors at Pitt Poetry Series, advising the Pitt Press on selection of poetry manuscripts. In 2023, Hayes, alongside Nancy Krygowski and Jeffrey McDaniel, was named editor of the Pitt Poetry Series.

He released the poetry collection So To Speak in 2023. He took part in the 25th edition of Poesiefestival Berlin in 2024. In 2024, he had authored seven poetry collections and eleven books. In 2024, he remained a creative writing professor at New York University.

== Awards ==
- National Endowment for the Arts Fellowship
- James Laughlin Award runner-up, from the Academy of American Poets
- 1999: Whiting Award
- 1999: Kate Tufts Discovery Award for Muscular Music
- 2001: National Poetry Series, for Hip Logic
- 2005: Pushcart Prize, a Best American Poetry 2005 selection
- 2009: Guggenheim Fellowship
- 2010: National Book Award for Poetry, for Lighthead
- 2011: United States Artists Zell Fellow for Literature
- 2014: MacArthur Foundation Fellow
- 2020: Bobbitt National Prize for Poetry for American Sonnets for My Past and Future Assassin
- 2023: Troy University's Hall-Waters Prize

== Personal life ==
Hayes and his ex-wife, the poet and professor Yona Harvey, have two children. He dated Padma Lakshmi in 2021. He lived for two decades in Pittsburgh before moving to New York, and in 2019, he lived in Greenwich Village.

== Bibliography ==
=== Poetry ===
Collections

- — (1999). Muscular music. Tia Chucha Press.
- — (2002). Hip Logic. Penguin Books. ISBN 978-0-14-200139-4.
- — (2006). Muscular music. Reprint. Carnegie Mellon University Press. ISBN 9780887484384.
- — (2006). Wind in a Box. Penguin Books. ISBN 9781440626982.
- — (2010). Lighthead. Penguin Books. ISBN 9781440626982.—winner of the National Book Award
- — (2015). How to Be Drawn. Penguin Books. ISBN 9780143126881.
- — (2018). American Sonnets for My Past and Future Assassin. Penguin Books. ISBN 9780143133186.
- — (2023) So to Speak. Penguin. | ISBN 9780143137726. Ebook | ISBN 9780593511848. Audiobook | ISBN 9780593684009
- — (2023) Watch Your Language. Penguin. ISBN 9780143137733.

List of poems

Title	Year	First published	Reprinted/collected
"Ars poetica with bacon"	2016	Hayes, Terrance (July 11–18, 2016). "Ars poetica with bacon". The New Yorker. Vol. 92, no. 21. pp. 78–79.	
"American Sonnet for the New Year"	2019	Hayes, Terrance (January 14, 2019). "American Sonnet for the New Year". The New Yorker. Vol. 94, no. 44. p. 45.	

=== Nonfiction ===
- — (2018). To Float in the Space Between: A Life and Work in Conversation with the Life and Work of Etheridge Knight. Wave Books. ISBN 978-1-940696-61-4.

== See also ==
- List of poets from the United States
- List of University of Pittsburgh alumni
- List of New York University faculty
- List of Spring Valley High School alumni
