= Mirabell: Books of Number =

1978 poetry collection by James Merrill

- First edition cover
- Author: James Merrill
- Cover artist: Dorothea Barlow
- Language: English
- Series: The Changing Light at Sandover
- Genre: Epic Poetry
- Published: 1978 Atheneum
- Publication place: United States
- Media type: Print (hardcover)
- Pages: 182 pp
- ISBN: 0-689-10901-6
- OCLC: 644651034
- Preceded by: The Book of Ephraim
- Followed by: Scripts for the Pageant

Mirabell: Books of Number is a volume of poetry by James Merrill (1926–1995) published by Atheneum Books in 1978. It is the second of three books which together form the epic 560-page poem, The Changing Light at Sandover, which was published as a whole in 1982.

Mirabell won the 1979 U.S. National Book Award for Poetry. It was the fourth time Merrill was nominated and the second time he won.

== Style and structure ==
Mirabell is divided into ten sections, each represented by an Arabic numeral (starting with '0' and ending with '9') and corresponding to the numbers on a Ouija board. The critic Stephen Yenser has noted that each section begins with a pun on its corresponding number. For example, section 5 begins with the word "Go" which matches the Japanese transliteration for 5.

The book takes place over several séances at a Ouija board in a "domed, round, red room in Stonington" during the summer of 1976 All messages received from supernatural characters via Ouija board appear in small capitals and are broken up by lowercase poetic commentary. Deceased humans always speak in decasyllabics, while the bat-like fallen angels speak in fourteen-syllable lines to enact a "metrical fall from grace."

Many have noted the difficulty of understanding Mirabell because of its allusive density, but the critic Helen Vendler argues that "the test of such a poem is not in the first reading ...but in the reading that takes place once the scheme, the family relations, and the life histories in question have become natural and familiar."

== Characters ==
The only recurring characters who are visible are James Merrill and his life partner, David Jackson. There are many other characters, however, who are unseen; they exist at different stages within a cosmological hierarchy—(many are deceased friends)—ringing the red room "to insulate the mediums with their affection from the lethal power of fifteen other 'beings' also present."

Timothy Materer has argued that Merrill's viewpoint cannot explicitly be connected to that of his character's. For instance, Merrill did not consider his mythology to be real—"except in recurrent euphoric hours when it's altogether too beautiful not the be true." For this reason, the critic Joseph Parisi draws a distinction between James Merrill the person and "JM" as he appears in The Changing Light at Sandover.

The critic Judith Moffett has called the supernaturally-occurring deceased friends "crucial" to the poem because of the "human interest they provide" which repeatedly serves as "providential relief from...pages of offbeat 'science' and 'theology.'"

The interruption provided by these friends, along with the use of caesura has allowed critics to find a motif of fragmentation, noting that "the word 'break,' in conjugated or participle form, recurs throughout Mirabell...it is a rupture, we learn, that necessitates the surgery DJ must undergo...the pain of the breakage constitutes the cost, for him, of admission to the celestial seminars...JM, for his part, has been told he will have an 'artistic breakthru.'"

The four main characters—James Merrill, David Jackson, Maria Mitsotáki (deceased), and W.H. Auden (deceased)—are chosen for inclusion in the spiritual education which comprises Mirabell for their childlessness, thus substituting virtues of the mind and heart for the "civic and familial and marital values usually espoused by the epic." The critic Helen Vendler sees Auden and Maria as parental figures: "They are people who call JM and DJ "mes enfants" (Maria, known as 'Maman') or 'my boys' (Auden)." In this way, the book can be seen as a long farewell to parental figures, especially since the death of David Jackson's parents kicks off the narrative.

The strangest characters in Mirabell are Merrill's bats, alternately referred to as "men b4 mankind", "the sons of cain", "fallen angels", and "antimatter. The critic David Kalstone has noted that these bats are "experienced adversaries and instructors whose clashing voices cast an odd light on the traditional speaker" by introducing "potentially inhuman aspects of mind and power".

== Summary ==
=== Book 0 ===
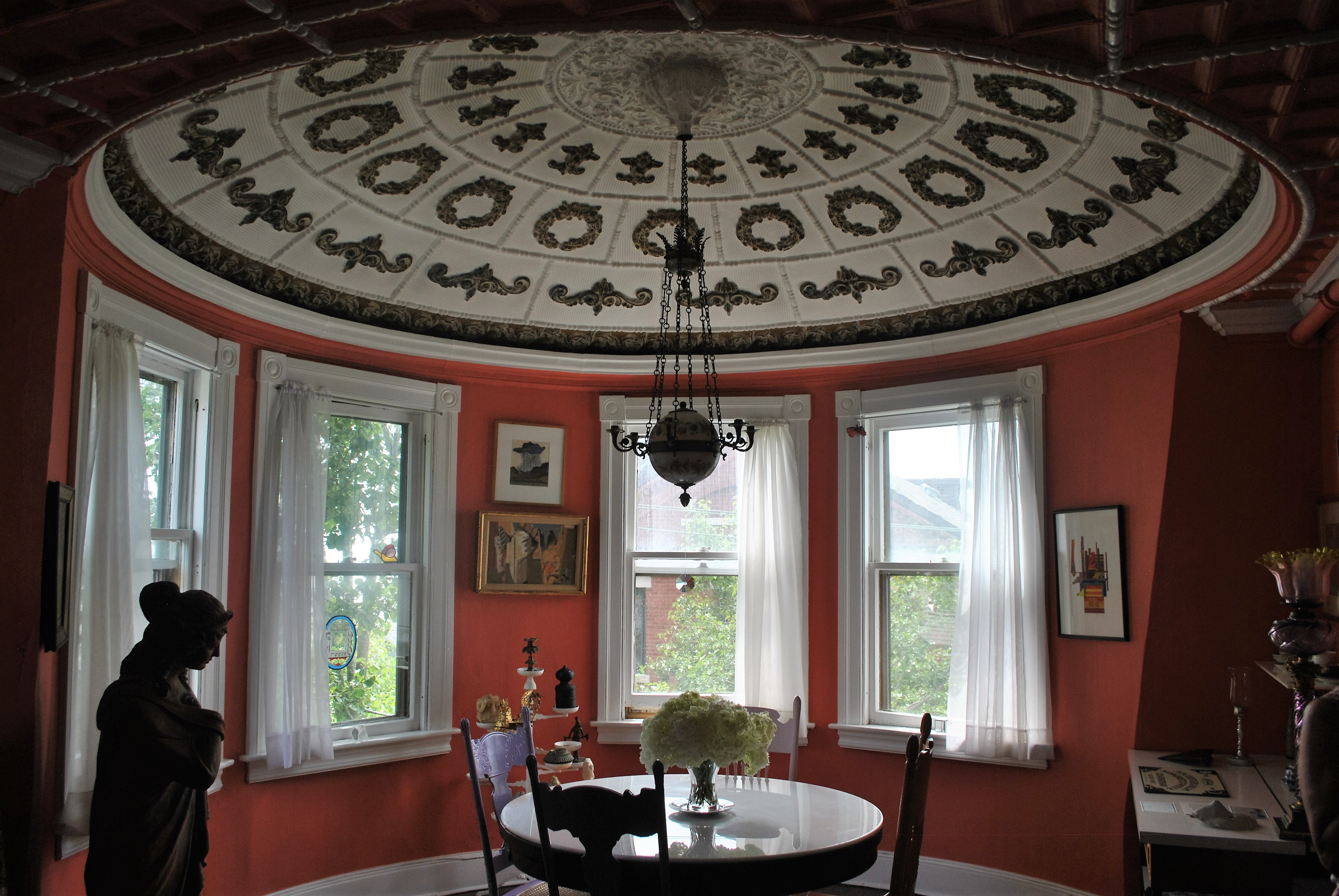
The 'red room' from the James Merrill House in Stonington, CT, where James Merrill and David Jackson conducted most of the scéances which would make up the plot of Mirabell

The narrative opens with a description of "Household decoration[s]" for James Merrill's residency in Stonington, CT. David Jackson (Merrill's life partner) hauls an "immense Victorian mirror," their parlor is outfitted with a "7 x 10 Chinese carpet" patterned with "blue-eyed bats"; their friend ("Hubbell") designs a wallpaper for them to match the bats in the Chinese carpet.

Then David Jackson's parents, "Matt and Mary" visit Merrill and their son in Athens. Matt and Mary are days away from death. Since their friends, Chester Kallman and Maria Mitsotáki, have died in "the previous year", James Merrill and David Jackson return to the Ouija board used in The Book of Ephraim. Maria commends "DJ's old parents, now [that] the end is near". Sure enough, Mary dies in the hospital, after which James Merrill and David Jackson make contact with the latter's parents via Ouija board. According to the theology outlined in the first part of The Changing Light at Sandover, Matt will be reborn on Earth for "2 more lives".

After some time, Ephraim, their Familiar spirit, alerts Merrill that he has been chosen by "men b4 mankind" for an "artistic breakthrough"; his task will be to write "poems of science". Merrill reads several scientific texts for inspiration but none comes.

The section closes as Merrill and Jackson make plans to visit Avebury ("both a holy and a homely site") and Stonehenge.

=== Book 1 ===
The "men b4 mankind" (mentioned in Section 0 of Mirabell and Section U of The Book of Ephraim) reveal themselves to be "the sons of cain" and have the physical appearance of bats. Paradoxically, they are also fallen angels who caused the appearance of black holes and serve as the negative electrical charge and antimatter itself. Maria Mitsotáki and Ephraim interrupt to speak to "JM" and "DJ" (characters are often referred to by their initials); Maria voices encouragement; Ephraim voices fear and disdain, a feeling shared by "DJ".

James complains about the bats' use of veiled and nonspecific language, causing them to fly off in anger.

David Kalstone, a friend of Merrill's, comes to visit; at the Ouija board, the bats are silent. Instead, Kalstone is introduced to his heavenly representative, Luca Spionari, a sixteen-year-old "lissome...stripling" from Milan.

The next day, the bats return to tell of fourteen anchor sites that they left when they abandoned Earth (Avebury is one of these sites). They also describe the Egyptian pyramids as exact prisms of light reproduced in stone; the poem which James Merrill is creating will be a similar prism of light, but textual instead of physical.

The section closes as Ephraim reappears to assure protection from these bats should they seek to cause harm. Among those defending is Ephraim and many of Merrill's deceased friends: Maya Deren, Hans Lodeizen, Marius Bewley, W. H. Auden, and Chester Kallman. W.H. Auden and Maria Mitsotáki will provide Merrill with routine commentary on lessons given by the bat-like sons of cain as Mirabell progresses.

=== Book 2 ===
The section opens as the bat who has been speaking reveals he has a number—741—though he ranks among "a figuratively numberless host" and is not always the creature with whom Merrill and Jackson converse. For instance, they had earlier spoken to 40076, but he abandoned them because of their rudeness.

Merrill uses part of this section to define important words in the theology which these fallen angels are slowly sketching for him: Jew is described as a "density in man par excellence" (not to be confused with the ethnicity); soul is the 12% of man which is not "Chemistry, Environment, / Et al."; the Research Lab (or R/Lab) is a "precinct of intense / Activity" and contains an array of mathematical formulae directed by 741's superiors and where there is "No raw material / Other than souls ranging in quality". Souls of the absolute highest quality belong to a select five, "immortals" who retain "through each rebirth a perfect knowledge of all their previous lives...Certain incarnations of the Five having been in one life or another: Montezuma, Galileo, Mozart, Dag Hammarskjöld, Einstein." These Five "pursue their leadership / under various guises"—such as space research. Merrill's job as "scribe" will be "to help speed the acceptance of the 5's work".

741 goes on to discuss the population explosion in recent years: he says that the R/Lab needs five million souls each day for placement in new-born humans, but because there is only a finite number of souls, his superiors have needed to resort to "the souls of domestic animals most recently the rat". The lab worries about "a concerted use of atomic / weaponry now falling into hands of animal souls". Such change is concerning, but equally concerning is the knowledge that the R/Lab technicians used to see 100 years ahead, but lately, increasing human smog has limited their visibility to thirty years into the future.

=== Book 3 ===
741 introduces another type of soul, one separate from the animal and human souls already described: plant (or vegetable) souls. Whereas animal densities might add a certain "joie de vivre", these plant densities endow its bearer with a "benign lack of destructive rivalry". Unfortunately, a slow and unknown process is weakening the vegetable world, so the R/Lab has begun to experimentally manufacture these plant densities via cloning. The critic Judith Moffett has clarified that cloning "often seems to signify...something more like modify or program". Maria, who was heavily interested in gardening during her life, is destined to join this world of plants.

But something stranger is afoot. 741, heretofore known to be unfeeling like the rest of his vampiric acquaintances, admits that he has come to love Merrill and Jackson—admits that he is filled with "is it manners?" This emotional development is matched by a formal one: 741 transforms into a peacock within the "realm of no appearances".

The five of them (Mitsotáki, Auden, Merrill, Jackson, and 741) are now pictured as a unified group—equal in number to the holy '5' discussed earlier. With this, the notion of "v work" is cryptically inaugurated; 741 describes it as "work guided by a higher collaboration". The five elite souls (mentioned in section 2.5) are symbolically connected to the five protagonists, the five vertices on a pyramid, and the four elements (with "nature" serving as a fifth). Five will later be symbolically connected to the "4 seasons & 1 sun".

=== Book 4 ===
741 says that the first animals on Earth were "wingless creatures...crawling and serpentine". Though these creatures were hairless, they resembled the mythic centaur and invented 741's race to carry "their word above the trees: signals...hovering over clear land areas where they cd feed".

Eventually, 741 and his race decided to kill the immortals via atomic blast to prevent the more evolved from tormenting the weak. The bats left, rarely returning to make vital repairs to their anchor sites. This neglect leads God B to erase traces of 741's kin and to destroy the last centaurs (who, by this point, had evolved into Dinosaurs).

W.H. Auden and Maria Mitsotáki encourage James Merrill and David Jackson to make contact with 40076 (mentioned at the beginning of Section 2); 741 is temporarily demoted because his listeners doubted him, but prophesies laurels for Merrill's poem, saying that he will write another long poem after this one. 741 then says that Akhnaton was the first of "the 5" to be cloned for repurposing in future generations; he also describes the commencement of a "no accident" clause which will be elucidated later.

The section closes as Maria Mitsotáki and James Merrill learn that atomic energies have affected their soul densities; Maria's because of the radiation therapy she underwent for breast cancer. James' because of the mushroom cloud from Hiroshima.

=== Book 5 ===
Book 5 clarifies many previously touched-upon topics: Human soul densities can be destroyed by gamma rays; "God B is history is Earth"; the 'day of the scribe' is at hand. Merrill, as scribe, will create a work that will prevent destruction, though when he and Jackson ask how this can be when so few people read books, 741 returns with a customary reply about the unimportance of the masses.

741 tells Merrill and Jackson that religion falls into his "no-accident clause" by keeping starved sub-populations from dropping atomic bombs to get food. Another "no-accident" is the apparition of plagues, which (in Merrill's mythology) do not happen accidentally, but are caused by 741 and his ilk to thin populations and maintain rurality. Most importantly, it seems to mean that what happens to R/Lab souls "is planned and purposeful to the minutest detail." James begins to apply this "no-accident" clause to his own life history.

The section closes on the hopeful suggestion that "three decades hence," there will still be "green atlantan fields". 741 assures that Biology will win out over Chaos.

=== Book 6 ===
The section opens with Merrill visiting David Jackson in Boston; Jackson is not in Stonington with Merrill because he has just undergone surgery on his back, but "all's well." Jackson recalls the sensation of climbing a ladder; (Jacob has an identical dream in Genesis 28).

Book 6 also shows Merrill and Jackson coming to the horrifying conclusion that Maria Mitsotáki (who underwent radiation therapy for breast cancer) is appearing in these séances because she, like 741, has no soul left—"she's no longer human!" Radiation's interaction with the soul has already been alluded to, but Merrill and Jackson do not recognize the full extent until now: radiation slowly stripped Maria's soul, reducing her "to essences" and joining her "to infinity". The process of these lessons will enact a similar stripping process on James and David, the 'light' of radiation being substituted with the 'light' of knowledge. Through this 'stripping,' god b is either changing man into his agent or preparing a new species, though which one is not exactly clear.

Auden and 741 also instruct JM and DJ on different colors (red, yellow, blue, green) and their exact symbolism within this ever-expanding mythology. Amid these never-ending lessons, DJ feels depressed.

The section closes as Merrill and Jackson are told that major literary works such as The Waste Land, The Divine Comedy, and works by Arthur Rimbaud were all written with the invisible guiding hand of 741 and his legion of bats. These literary masterpieces are part of the "v-work" mentioned in Book 3. Merrill's poem will be a completion of the "v-work" started by his deceased friend, Hans Lodeizen.

=== Book 7 ===
Akhnaton, first of 'the 5' was a "double soul" with Nefertiti, and the R/Lab was created to clone their soul densities. Towards the end of their lives, Akhnaton "slept only / druggd, nef[ertiti]not at all". Thus, Nefertiti "drew / the knife over their 4 wrists." God B allowed them to die since they "outlive[d] their usefulness". Under these conditions, 741 endorses suicide so as to get their souls recycled as soon as possible.

James Merrill decides on Mirabell for 741's name, taken from William Congreve's The Way of the World. 741 (henceforth referred to as Mirabell) says that he likes his name and that there will be ten more lessons until the end of Mirabell: Books of Number. The first of these lessons is on the subject of the soul.

The "base of the soul" is crafted by drawing on the energy sources previously mentioned as 'densities' and stemming from the four elements.The second of ten 'last lessons' is on the subject of the body, which is pictured as the "soul's dwelling place the house calld man/psyche".

=== Book 8 ===
Mirabell describes the development of culture, starting with an early hominid scribbling a square into the mud and ending with language and the appearance of the Bible, the Koran, and the Homeric epics. He also teaches Merrill and Jackson about the weather, saying that "any imbalance is...man's work".

Mirabell also says that atomic testing must cease so that the atom can "be returned / to the [R/Lab] & the uses of paradise". Importantly, he counsels that each couple have no more than two children to prevent overpopulation, lamenting man's inability to control his primal instincts. Even though Nature commands man to reproduce, God B would like these impulses checked.

The next 'mooncycle', an angel will appear in their scéance, but a representative tells Merrill and Jackson that they will not be allowed to smoke, drink, or consume meat for a full twenty-four hours before so that the angel can be accorded their "unclouded reason and...total reverence".

Meanwhile, Mirabell defines man's imaginative power as belonging to the 's/o/l' or 'source-of-light'. Robert Morse, a friend, also comes to visit but dies shortly after.

Judith Moffett has noticed that the lessons which begin towards the close of Book 8 and continuing throughout Book 9 become "increasingly lyrical and clear".

=== Book 9 ===
Merrill and Jackson have a picnic before Mirabell transmits his last lesson. Maria tells Merrill and Jackson that she has peeked at Merrill's developing poem and is thrilled, but James seems frustrated with its dramatic nature, wishing it were all in his voice rather than those of Wystan's or Mirabell's. Auden, however, exhorts him to "think what a minor / part the self plays in a work of art".

Mirabell now ranks higher in the cosmological hierarchy than he did at the start of this narrative and tells Merrill and Jackson that Ephraim (who dictated the lessons in The Book of Ephraim) was his pupil. Mirabell offers his last lesson two days before the angel arrives; he recapitulates the instructions for purification from Book 8.

Merrill takes stock of the day leading up to the angelic visitation, hour by hour. At 5:00 PM, the angel seems to arrive, defining God as "the accumulated intelligence in cells since the death of the first distant cell", and informing Merrill and Jackson that his name is Michael. The book ends as Michael commands Merrill and Jackson to look towards the setting sun, to look "into the red eye of your god!"

== Literary influences ==
When imagining how readers might respond to Mirabell: Books of Number, the critic David Lehman suggested they might connect the large undead population of Mirabell with the "mock-heroic machinery" of The Rape of the Lock, questioning the purportedly 'scientific' basis of the poem and concluding that the work is "rather silly"; or, in response to the skeptical air assumed by Merrill throughout much of the poem, they may liken Merrill's use of the Ouija board "as a kind of Jungian trick" to find creative insights within the self. Lehman notes that Yeats did a similar thing when he took note of his wife's sleep-talking. However, David Lehman says that the "committed reader will go further [emphasis added]", finding the poem no mere "trick" by focusing on the value of the ritualistic in Merrill's oeuvre, "the processes that prepares one to receive a vision of, and communion with, divinity."

The critic Helen Sword locates Merrill's use of the supernatural within a greater literary tradition: "Rainer Maria Rilke experimented briefly with the planchette...and H.D. conversed by means of a tapping table with a group of slain R.A.F. pilots who spelled out dire predictions of nuclear disaster." Sylvia Plath, for example, would write a "Dialog Over a Ouija Board".

Alternately, Helen Vendler locates literary influences in the works specifically name-checked by Merrill as "works written by men to whom the angels speak outright: Dante, the four Apostles, Buddha, Muhammad, and, in later days, Milton, Blake, Victor Hugo, and Yeats." Edmund White and Joseph Parisi would also compare Mirabell to Paradise Lost.

David Wagoner locates Merrill's stylistic behavior within a larger poetic tradition including John Ashbery and John Barth since he "writes in the ironic mode identified twenty years ago by Northrop Frye. One objective of this irony is to anticipate criticism and work it into the fabric of the poem, thus disarming the critic and clearing the field for the triumphant author."

Joseph Parisi likens Mirabell to The Magic Flute, pointing out that both rely on a mixture of "parody, pastiche, and high seriousness" and both involve a moral quest with many surprising vicissitudes. David Bromwich agrees about the style of Mirabell's verse, saying that Merrill has the "buoyancy of Wilde", often resembling Jean Cocteau's Orpheus or certain long poems in its use of the "autobiographical quest" intermixed with notions of the supreme. Bromwich mentions Wallace Stevens' poem, Notes Toward a Supreme Fiction, Paterson and The Cantos, claiming that all use a "trial-and-error cosmogony and important messages from important friends".

Finally, David Kalstone suggests a connection between the chiropteran "men b4 mankind" and Richard Wilbur's poem, "Mind".

== Critical reception ==
The critic Helen Vendler notes that Mirabell "shares with all systems—from Leviticus to The Book of Mormon and Melville's cetology— a sheer willingness to bore" but frames this as a way in which to enlarge the stylistic scope of the poem in rejection of the "exclusively beautiful." David Wagoner, on the subject of Mirabell's doctrinal lessons, would be far less generous, calling the poem as "inartistic as the content is fatuous; the structure is haphazard; the lyricism virtually mute." Harold Bloom initially took issue with the lengthy sections of doctrine as well. He wrote privately to Merrill, saying he was "dazzled" but that the doctrine was much too prolonged and he wished for more of the poetic commentary by Merrill and less of the dialogue. Even so, after reading the final poem, Bloom seems to have foregone his former conclusions, stating that the work was "a coherence and a splendor". David Bromwich seems to agree with Bloom's initial view, regretting Merrill's "tendency to allow fewer and more modest occasions of human eloquence, while the prattle of patrons increases in both volume and ambition." Joseph Parisi reconciles the excessive 'prattle of patrons' by comparing Mirabell to an opera seria (despite all the "buffa"). In this analogy, the phantasmal doctrine, though tiresome, is as equally necessary as recitativo for the advancement of plot and narrative. The scarcity of Merrill's aria-like poetic commentary only helps to make it more special, more jarringly beautiful. Robert Shaw, reviewing for The New York Times also said that Mirabell contained "a good many beauties and perplexities", while also finding the phantasmal doctrine tiresome.

Shaw also believed that the campy conversations might be too forbidding for readers since they led to an air of cliquishness. Dana Yeaton may have been trying to voice the same argument when she discredited the trilogy for containing very little content to which the reader could relate. Stephen Spender concurs more lengthily on the subject of camp cliquishness but notes that such a style has "strategic advantages" since it can cleverly transform into the double entendre, used by Merrill with a rococo quality. Writing for The New York Review of Books, Spender would describe Merrill's work as a "complex and elaborate fantasy which yields beautiful insights, wonderful lines of poetry, sustained flights of lyricism, shining witticisms, examples of great technical virtuosity, but not a unifying vision, the result of some obsessive act of the imagination."

Daisy Aldan describes Mirabell as "perplexing", claiming that Merrill, on first reading, seems to offer a "brilliant panorama" of human society from the ground up, but upon re-reading, finds the work pretentious and fascistic in its description of "absolute truths". Judith Moffett, however, thinks Mirabell should not be read for its "Truth" but for the quality of its poetry, which she suggests is greater in scope and technical virtuosity than most (if not all) of twentieth-century poetry. Edmund White agreed, finding Merrill's verse to be "electric with alternating currents of sympathy and scorn." For White, the book's only flaw was that the 'scorn' was occasionally so excessive as to migrate into the realm of cruelty.
