= Familiar Spirits =

2000 book by Alison Lurie

Familiar Spirits: A Memoir of James Merrill and David Jackson
- Author: Alison Lurie
- Language: English
- Genre: Memoir
- Publication date: 2000
- Publication place: United States

Familiar Spirits: A Memoir of James Merrill and David Jackson is a memoir published in 2000 by American writer Alison Lurie. In it, she recounts a friendship with a poet James Merrill and his life partner David Jackson which began in the 1950s.Merrill and Jackson were both wealthy, well-educated men, who lived an openly gay life decades before that was common. The two men spent many years gathering Ouija board messages during séances, a fact of which Lurie was made aware of early on, and about which she never lost her early skepticism. For Merrill, the poetic result was a 560-page apocalyptic epic called The Changing Light at Sandover (1982), which is in a large measure transcribed from supernatural voices. In Familiar Spirits, Lurie attempts to provide several rational and mundane explanations for Merrill and Jackson's epiphanies and revelations.
