= Ingram Merrill Foundation =

American private foundation (1950s-1996)

The Ingram Merrill Foundation was a private foundation established in the mid-1950s by poet James Merrill (1926-1995), using funds from his substantial family inheritance. Over the course of four decades, the foundation would provide financial support to hundreds of writers and artists, many of them in the early stages of promising but not yet remunerative careers. Dissolved in 1996 (a year after Merrill's death), the Ingram Merrill Foundation was at that point disbursing approximately $300,000 a year.

Support from the Ingram Merrill Foundation could be variously described as an "Award", a "Fellowship", a "Prize", or a "Grant". Recipients themselves often used these terms interchangeably, and it is unclear whether there was ever a meaningful distinction between them reflecting the degree or amount of financial support (stipends could vary widely among Ingram Merrill recipients). By reapplying, it was possible to win an Award more than once in a career; at least one writer received three separate grants, and The Little Players puppet troupe was subsidized largely by the foundation for over twenty years.

Although Merrill could lobby his own Board—not always with success—on behalf of writers and artists whose work and circumstances he felt particularly compelling, his interference in the grant-giving process was officially discouraged. This was by Merrill's own design: a measure of formal disengagement from his namesake foundation helped immunize him from "the friends of the friends" who might feel tempted to "put in a good word with Jimmy" on a pending application. In the event, Merrill could truthfully reply that decisions were out of his hands.

The Foundation supported specific public television programming in the early 1970s and gave occasional grants to arts organizations.

== Recipients ==
Visual artists known to have received Ingram Merrill Foundation financial support include Edward Dugmore, Ruth E. Fine, Yvonne Jacquette, Gabriel Laderman, Eric Pankey, Patrick Webb, Jane Wilson, and Marcia Marcus.

Max Kozloff, a noted art historian, editor, and art critic, received an award. Jean Erdman, a dancer and choreographer, also received funding.

Composers known to have received Ingram Merrill funding include Bruce Saylor, Claudio Spies, and Charles Wuorinen.

Writers (including essayists, novelists, short story writers, translators, poets, and playwrights, among others) known to have received Ingram Merrill support include Walter Abish, Ellen Akins, Agha Shahid Ali, Dick Allen, Julia Alvarez, John Ash, John Ashbery, Russell Banks, Wendy Battin, Gina Berriault, Linda Bierds, Elizabeth Bishop, Thomas Bolt, David Bosworth, David Bottoms, Jane Bowles, Rosellen Brown, Victor Bumbalo, Frederick Busch, Ethan Canin, Turner Cassity, Henri Cole, Martha Collins, Jane Cooper, John Crowley, Deborah Digges, W. S. Di Piero, Mark Doty, Norman Dubie, Deborah Eisenberg, Tony Eprile, Kathy Fagan, Irving Feldman, Donald Finkel, Alice Fulton, James Galvin, Jorie Graham, Debora Greger, Allan Gurganus, Marilyn Hacker, Rachel Hadas, John Haines, Daniel Hall, Judith Hall, Jeffrey Harrison, Shelby Hearon, Oscar Hijuelos, Geoffrey Hill, Daryl Hine, David Hinton, Edward Hirsch, Daniel Hoffman, A. D. Hope, Maureen Howard, Andrew Hudgins, Wojciech Karpiński, Galway Kinnell, Karl Kirchwey, Peter Klappert, Caroline Knox, Ann Lauterbach, David Lehman, Brad Leithauser, Phillis Levin, Elizabeth Macklin, Thomas Mallon, Cormac McCarthy, Mary McCarthy, J. D. McClatchy, Joseph McElroy, Lynne McMahon, Sandra McPherson, Christopher Merrill, Judith Moffett, Ted Mooney, Julian Moynahan, Carol Muske-Dukes, Josip Novakovich, Jacqueline Osherow, Molly Peacock, Walter Perrie, Robert Polito, Stanley Plumly, Jeremy Reed, Donald Revell, Michael J. Rosen, Mark Rudman, Kay Ryan, David St. John, Mary Jo Salter, Stephen Sandy, Sherod Santos, James Scully, David Shapiro, Robert Siegel, Charles Simic, Jeffrey Skinner, William Jay Smith, W. D. Snodgrass, Roberta Spear, Mark Strand, Christopher Tilghman, Tony Towle, Paul Violi, Alice Walker, Theodore Weiss, Rachel Wetzsteon, Edmund White, Elie Wiesel, Charles Wright, John Yau and Stephen Yenser, among others.
