= Divine Comedies =

1976 poetry collection by James Merrill

- Author: James Merrill
- Genre: Poetry
- Publisher: Atheneum Books
- Publication date: 1976

Divine Comedies is the seventh book of poetry by James Merrill (1926–1995). Published in 1976 (see 1976 in poetry), the volume includes "Lost in Translation" and all of The Book of Ephraim. The Book of Ephraim is the first of three books which make up The Changing Light at Sandover.

Although Merrill had written years before, in "Voices from the Other World", of having supernatural experiences with a Ouija board, Divine Comedies was far more candid about the extent of a practice which had preoccupied Merrill for several decades. The Book of Ephraim, in taking the spiritual as its working landscape, took confessionalism to an entirely unexpected territory. Merill believed that many historical poets of eras past, including W. H. Auden, speak through the Ouija board, as well as Merrill's old friend, the filmmaker Maya Deren.

Some readers dismiss Merrill's unorthodox working methods. The Ouija board, telegraphing its eerie messages in capital letters, conveys poetry through automatic writing. Merrill's partner, David Jackson, shared the teacup and transcription duties which led to The Book of Ephraim.

The volume includes the 92-page-long The Book of Ephraim and the following shorter poems: The Kimono, Lost in Translation, McKane's Falls, Chimes for Yahya, Manos Karastefanis, Yannina, Verse for Urania, The Will, and Whitebeard on Videotape

Divine Comedies was awarded the Pulitzer Prize for Poetry in 1977.
