= Lodeizen =

Lodeizen is a surname. Notable people with the surname include:

- Hans Lodeizen (1924–1950), Dutch poet
- Rifka Lodeizen (born 1972), Dutch actress
