= Voices from the Other World =

Poem by James Merrill

"Voices from the Other World" is a celebrated early poem by James Merrill (1926 – 1995). it marks the poet's first use of transcripts from a ouija board, a trope later explored at great length in the poet's apocalyptic epic "The Changing Light at Sandover" (1982).It was first published in 1959.

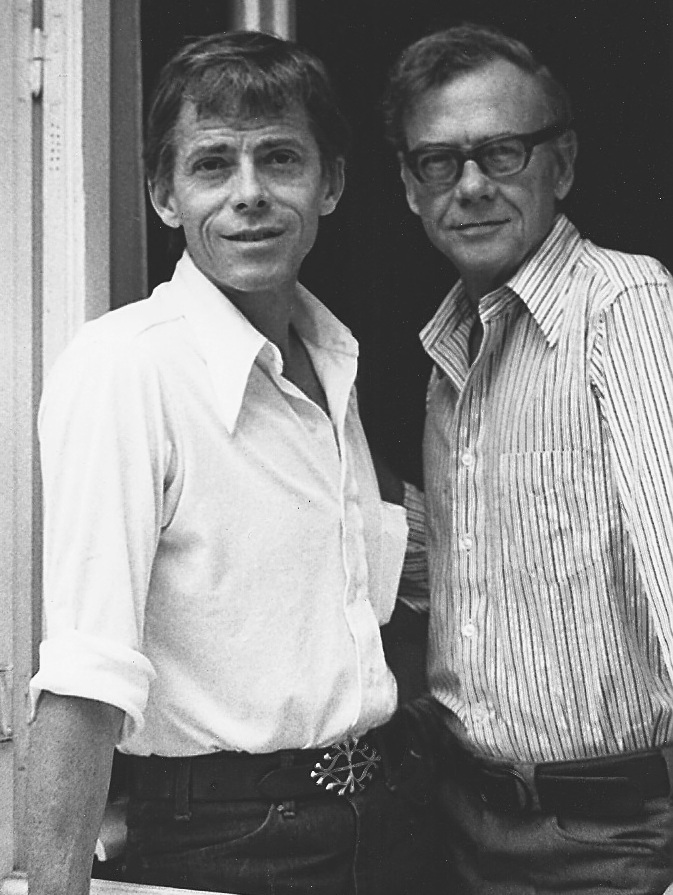
James Merrill and David Jackson at home in Athens, Greece, 14 October 1973. With the help of psychic readings transcribed by the couple from a home-made ouija board, Merrill would compose "Voices from the Other World", the first of many poems to explore the ouija board conceit. (Photograph by Judith Moffett)

== Production method ==
The poem, written in the first person plural, consists of nine irregularly-rhymed five-line stanzas. The (unnamed) narrators of the poem are Merrill and his partner David Jackson, who together — after a Ouija board had been given to Merrill as a present by his friend Frederick Buechner in the early 1950s — would conduct hundreds of private séance sessions over the course of nearly four decades, an undertaking Merrill would come to mine extensively for "material."

== Ignored warnings by spirits ==
In this early spiritual encounter, the ouija board voices warn Merrill and Jackson of the perils of speaking with the dead, though by poem's end the two mediums have been lulled into a sense of nonchalance about the enterprise.

== Publication history ==
"Voices from the Other World" was first published in book form in The Country of a Thousand Years of Peace (1959).
