= Peter Klappert =

American poet (born 1942)

- Born: 1942 (age 83–84); Rockville Centre, New York, U.S.
- Education: Cornell University; University of Iowa
- Occupation: Poet
- Writing career
- Genre: Poetry

Peter Klappert (born 1942 in Rockville Centre, New York) is an American poet.

== Life ==
He grew up in West Hempstead, New York, and Rowayton, Connecticut. He graduated from Cornell University and the University of Iowa, with an M.A. and an M.F.A.

His work has appeared in AGNI, Antaeus, Atlantic Monthly, Harper's, Ploughshares, AWP Chronicle, Lambda Book Report, The Gettysburg Review, and The Southern Review.

He was Briggs-Copeland Lecturer at Harvard University, and Writer-in-Residence at College of William and Mary.

He taught at Rollins College and New College of Florida, and George Mason University before retiring in 2006.

== Awards ==
- 1971 Yale Younger Poets Award
- 1973 National Endowment for the Arts grant
- Ingram Merrill Foundation grant
- Yaddo resident fellowship
- The MacDowell Colony resident fellowship
- La Fondation Karolyi resident fellowship
- The Millay Colony for the Arts resident fellowship

== Works ==
- "The Cat Lover", AGNI 4, 1975
- "Enrichissez Vous", AGNI 4, 1975
- "Variegations", AGNI 4, 1975
- "Satan Who Is Most Noisy When He Whispers", AGNI 12, 1980
- "If Innocent", Ploughshares, Summer 1981
- "The Prime of Life", Ploughshares, Winter 1991-92
- "CHOKECHERRIES"; "IMPATIENS"; "DOSTOEVSKI SAID MAN"; "CLOSING IN NEW HAVEN"; "THE COURTSHIP OF THE MORTICIANS"; "J'ACCUSE", Beltway Poetry Quarterly Volume 3, Number 1, Winter 2002
- "CEREBRAL CORTEX", Six Gallerys Press
- How I Stopped Writing Poetry and Other Poems
- Chokecherries: New and Selected Poems, 1966-1999. Orchises. 2000. ISBN 978-0-914061-81-6.
- Circular Stairs, Distress in the Mirrors. Marlboro, Vt.: Six Gallery Press. 2008. ISBN 978-0-9810091-1-7.
- Idiot Princess of the Last Dynasty. New York: Knopf. 1984. ISBN 978-0-394-51383-6.
- '52 pick-up: scenes from the conspiracy : a documentary : a poem in 52 scenes, 2 jokers and an extra ace of spades. Orchises Press. 1984. ISBN 978-0-914061-02-1.
- Lugging Vegetables to Nantucket. New Haven, Conn.: Yale University Press. 1971. ISBN 978-0-300-01453-2.

=== Anthologies ===
- William Smart, ed. (1984). "Stages of a Journey Inland". From Mt. San Angelo: stories, poems & essays. Associated University Presses. p. 105. ISBN 978-0-8453-4508-5.
