= Roberta Spear =

American poet (1948–2003)

- Born: 1948; Hanford, California, U.S.
- Died: 2003 (aged 54–55)
- Occupation: Poet

Roberta Spear (Sept 26, 1948 in Hanford, California – April 3, 2003) was an American poet.

== Life ==
Robertal Spear was born Sept 26, 1948 in Hanford California. She spent her early years in the Central Valley of California, graduating from Hanford High School. She earned a BA and MA from California State University, Fresno.

Spear published three books of poetry: The Pilgrim Among Us (1991), Taking to Water (1984), and Silks (1980). Her work appeared in Field, Ploughshares, Poetry, and The Missouri Review. She lived in Fresno, California. She died April 3, 2003.

== Awards ==
- Ingram Merrill Fellowship
- 1979 National Poetry Series

== Works ==
- "The Workout", The Atlantic, December 2002
- "Conversions", Ploughshares, Winter 1988
- Silks: Poems. Holt, Rinehart and Winston. 1980.
- Talking to Water (Holt, Rinehart & Winston, 1985)
- The pilgrim among us. Wesleyan University Press. 1991. ISBN 978-0-8195-1200-0.
- Philip Levine, ed. (2007). A sweetness rising: new and selected poems. Great Valley Books. ISBN 978-1-59714-063-8.

=== Anthologies ===
- Stan Yogi, ed. (1996). "Some Voices". Highway 99: a literary journey through California's Great Central Valley. Heyday Books. p. 340. ISBN 978-0-930588-82-3. "Roberta Spear."
- Dave Smith; David Bottoms, eds. (1985). The Morrow anthology of younger American poets. Photographer David Bottoms. Quill. ISBN 978-0-688-03450-4.
- Christopher Buckley; David Oliveira; M. L. Williams, eds. (2001). How much earth: the Fresno poets. Roundhouse Press. ISBN 978-0-9666691-7-6.
- Michael Collier, ed. (1995). "Chestnuts for Verdi". The Wesleyan Tradition: Four Decades of American Poetry. Wesleyan University Press. ISBN 978-0-8195-1229-1.
