= Wendy Battin =

American poet

- Born: May 27, 1953; Wilmington, Delaware, U.S.
- Died: December 21, 2015 (aged 62)
- Education: Cornell University; University of Washington
- Occupation: Poet

Wendy Battin (May 27, 1953 – December 21, 2015) was an American poet.

== Life ==
Wendy Battin was born in Wilmington, Delaware and graduated from Cornell University and the University of Washington. She taught at MIT, Smith College, Syracuse University, Boston University, Connecticut College.

Her work has appeared in Field, Georgia Review, Gettysburg Review, Poetry, The Nation, Mississippi Review, Threepenny Review, and Yale Review.

She was the director of CAPA, the Contemporary American Poetry Archive.

She taught yoga, and lived in Mystic, Connecticut.

== Awards ==
- Fine Arts Work Center Fellowship
- Ingram Merrill Foundation Fellowship
- National Endowment for the Arts Fellowship
- 1982 Discovery / The Nation Award
- 1983 National Poetry Series, for Solar Wind
- Richard Snyder Memorial Prize, for Little Apocalypse

== Works ==
- "One Man Watches a Horse Race"; "Coelacanth", Eclectica
- "The Women on the Ward", Eclectica
- "THE NEWS FROM MARS", The Blue Moon Review
- "News and Sundries", Blue Penny Quarterly, Fall 1995
- "Seven", fieralingue
- "And the Two Give Birth to the Myriad of Things", fieralingue
- "Mercy 1"; "Mir, the World, or is it Peace", Hamilton Stone Review
- "Eve, Before"; "Drosophila"; "The Two of Cups"; "Triptych", Kimera: A Journal of Fine Writing
- "On a Line by Su Tung-p'o"; "Another Line from Su Tung-p'o"; "A Contract"; "Aubade: How Truth Will Out", Mississippi Review
- "Liberty", Salt River Review
- "Kali Yuga", Tattoo Highway
- "Silver"; "Aubade, The Truth Will Out"; "One Man Watches a Racehouse"; "Seven"; "How Nothing Happens"; "The Telling", Pares, University of Chile
- In the Solar Wind. Doubleday Books. October 1984. ISBN 978-0-385-19384-9.
- Little Apocalypse. Ashland Poetry Press. 1997. ISBN 978-0-912592-40-4.

=== Anthologies ===
- Lorrie Goldensohn, ed. (2006). "Mondrian's Forest". American War Poetry. Columbia University Press. ISBN 978-0-231-13310-4.
- John Matthias; William O'Rourke, eds. (January 15, 2009). Notre Dame Review: The First Ten Years. University of Notre Dame Press. ISBN 978-0-268-03512-9.
- Sam Hamill; Sally Anderson, eds. (2003). Poets against the War. Thunder's Mouth Press. ISBN 978-1-56025-539-0.
- W. Scott Olsen; Scott Cairns, eds. (September 1996). The Sacred Place: Witnessing the Holy in the Physical World. University of Utah Press. ISBN 978-0-87480-523-9.
