= Maria Mitsotáki =

Greek socialite

Maria Mitsotáki (Greek: Μαρία Μητσοτάκη; 1907–1974) was an Athens socialite, born to a prominent Greek political family. She allegedly appeared in Ouija board séances to her friends James Merrill (1926–1995) and David Jackson (1922–2001), becoming a major character in Merrill's The Changing Light at Sandover, a book-length supernatural epic poem published in 1982.
