= Pennterra =

1987 Judith Moffett science fiction novel

- Author: Judith Moffett
- Cover artist: Bryn Barnard
- Language: English
- Genre: Science fiction
- Publisher: Congdon & Weed
- Publication date: 1987
- Publication place: United States
- Media type: Print (hardback & paperback)
- Pages: 382
- ISBN: 0-86553-189-7

Pennterra is a science fiction novel by American author Judith Moffett, first published in 1987. Isaac Asimov wrote an introduction for the book and published it under his "Isaac Asimov Presents" series. Pennterra was reprinted in 2009 by Fantastic Books, an imprint of Warren Lapine's Wilder Publications.

== Plot ==
Quaker colonists founded a colony on a planet they dubbed Pennterra. They soon discovered the planet was already inhabited, by a species they dub the "hrossa". They put forward a number of conditions to the colonists, saying that they must not leave the valley they landed in, must not use machinery, and should keep their population about the same as the time they landed, approximately 600. The Quakers agree with these restrictions, and set up a camp called Swarthmore, in the valley they call the Delaware.

The hrossa, being capable of transferring their emotions onto others, often tapped into the Quakers as they held meeting for worship. This leaves a number of them much more tolerant of the hrossa conditions. Several, including George Quinlan and his son Danny, become more closely acquainted with the hrossa. At times they visit a nearby village called Lake-Between-Falls and develop a friendship with one of its elders, KliUrrh.

However, as the story begins a second colony ship arrives from Earth. These colonists, called the Sixers, are more skeptical of the hrossa request, and enter talks with the Quakers. For the most part, the Sixers are adamant about colonizing the planet with machinery, putting their own survival above the hrossa. However, two members of the crew, Maggie and Byron, along with Quakers Katy and George visit Lake-Between-Falls hoping for permission for a coastal town of their own. However, KliUrrh denies the request, saying that they must follow the same conditions given to the Quaker colonists. He explains that their god TuwukhKawan will never allow this, and they would be destroyed if they violate the request.

Many of the Quakers take this as representing a legitimate threat, but the Sixers do not see it as serious and believe the Quakers have simply been compromised by their contact with the hrossa. With permission from the hrossa, a team of Quakers come to Lake-Between-Falls to learn more about the hrossa and the planet in general, in order to get an idea of the threat to the Sixers.

The team consists of George, Swarthmore's de facto leader; his son, Danny, who is capable with the hross language; Katy, a psychologist; Alice, an exobiologist; and Bob, an amateur anthropologist. Initially, they make little progress, as the sexuality of the hross is transmitted to the team, making it difficult to do any work. This is especially problematic for Danny, who at age 12 has begun puberty. In separate encounters, Alice has sex with George, and Katy with Bob. It soon becomes apparent that free-for-all sex might be necessary to keep them at work, but George initially resists due to his son's presence. Another day, Katy allows Danny to dry hump her, to George's unease. However, he gives in and soon the five have regular intercourse with one another, including, after some time, Danny with his father.

This makes it easier for the team to work. Among their discoveries, they find out that the hermaphroditic hrossa typically give birth to only one child in a lifetime, and few die early. The occasional second birth makes up for those that do, and the population thus tends to remain stable. Going on a hunt with the hrossa, they learn that they hunt by transmitting a message of "hunger", which brings animals sacrificially to them. The hrossa have sexual intercourse with the animals, and then beat them with a club. The Quakers also tell many stories to the hrossa, hoping to trigger a response and learn more about the planet's natives. Finally, at Thanksgiving, the team leaves back to Swarthmore, and explain their findings to the town.

The team goes back for another month, but have little more success. Returning to camp, Danny has difficulty readjusting. Missing the hrossa form of sexuality, he finds himself having sex with sheep, and on a couple of occasions, the sympathetic Katy. Danny, being the only person his age in the town besides a kid named Jack, finds life back home insufferable. When Jack is offered to stay for some time in the new Sixer village, Danny is adamant about going there as well.

There Danny stays with Maggie, and goes to school in a town that allows him many more peers. He has trouble adjusting at first. He finds himself enjoying the skills behind basketball, but put off by the competition. Initially, his best friend in the colony is Maggie, who finds he acts much more mature than his age. Eventually, however, he meets a kid named Joel, who is highly interested in the hross. The two grow close, to the point he is comfortable discussing his sexual quirks. Joel describes him as a "human hross", which puts off Danny at first. However, he soon realizes the term fits his sexuality, but relabels himself a "Quaker hross".

One morning Danny leaves for a walk and notices footprints. Following them, he eventually comes to find Caddie, a classmate of his, alone and naked. She seems scared, which Danny does not understand, and when he turns to let her change, she knocks him out with a rock. Danny later learns that her father was abusing her, and reports him to a psychiatrist. Soon afterwards, she is adopted by another family in the settlement, and appears to show improvement.

Meanwhile, problems start to impact Sixertown. Many of the pregnant women who arrived on the planet had miscarriages or sudden abortions. A hross came to visit Danny, and told him he must leave the town soon, as the "destruction" was coming soon to Sixertown. The captain of the town allowed anyone who felt that the threat was credible to relocate to Swarthmore. However, only Danny, Joel, Jack, Caddie and Byron took the threat seriously, and were joined by Maggie in the trip to the Quaker town. However, the lander crashed and the five became stranded. They soon found water near the crash site, but their food reserves were limited, and it soon became clear that hoping for help to come to the lander might not be their best option. Maggie stayed with the lander to take care of Joel, as the others head out hoping to make it back on foot, or be found otherwise by someone. After some point, food reserves became scarce, and Caddie grew weak. Danny found that some animals would approach him, which he could have sex with and kill as the hrossa did. Byron decided that he should remain to take care of Caddie, and that Jack and Danny should continue on as before. Exhausted, they became famished at times only to have more animals offering themselves for sacrifice. After some time, they found their way back to the Delaware River, some 50 miles from camp, and were discovered.

While Caddie died, the other five survived back to camp. In the meantime, the problem at the Sixer camp became more serious, with none of their food sources able to reproduce. Eventually they gave in to the original hross conditions, and moved into the southern portion of the Delaware River. However, the population there was left permanently infertile due to their exposure to the compound that caused all their problems. It is also realized that those going through physical development on the planet could more easily integrate the planet's ecosystem than those who did not. This leaves the future situation of the human settlement unclear, as it suggests that those born on Pennterra could survive outside a human colony.

== Reception ==
Writing in The New York Times, Noel Perrin described the Moffett's book as "the only work of Quaker science fiction I know," saying it "already establishes her as a presence in the field. It's as interesting ecologically as literarily." Orson Scott Card praised Pennterra as "storytelling of the best sort," declaring that Moffett "handles all the genre techniques with skill, and with great respect for her material and her audience; she deals with ideas with intelligence and passion. . . . [S]he tells a powerful tale with clarity, simplicity, and an unconcealable love for her fellow-being."
