= The Changing Light at Sandover =

Epic poem by James Merrill

- Front cover of the first single-volume edition (November 1982) showing the ballroom of James Merrill's childhood home in the 1930s
- Author: James Merrill
- Cover artist: Harry Ford
- Language: English
- Genre: Epic Poetry, 20th Century American Poetry
- Publisher: Atheneum Books (Charles Scribner's Sons)
- Publication date: 1976 (The Book of Ephraim) 1978 (Mirabell: Books of Number) 1980 (Scripts for the Pageant)
- Publication place: United States
- Pages: 560
- ISBN: 9780689112836
- OCLC: 9248562

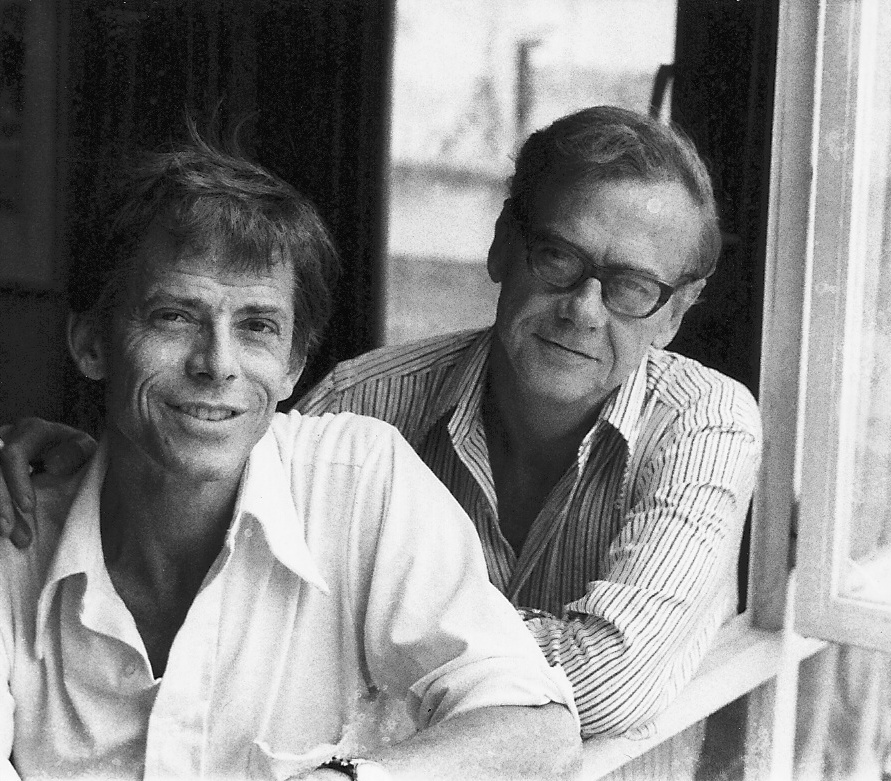
James Merrill and David Jackson at home in Athens, Greece, 1973

The Changing Light at Sandover is a 560-page epic poem by James Merrill (1926–1995). Sometimes described as a postmodern apocalyptic epic, the poem was published in three volumes from 1976 to 1980, and as one volume "with a new coda" in 1982.

== Two decades of transcribing ouija board communications ==
Merrill made a surprising detour by incorporating extensive occult messages into his work (although a poem from the 1950s, "Voices from the Other World", was the first of his works to quote such "otherworldly" voices). With his partner David Jackson, Merrill spent more than 20 years transcribing purportedly supernatural communications during séances using a ouija board.

== Beginning of the ouija board narrative cycle ==
Merrill published his first ouija board narrative cycle in 1976, with a poem for each of the letters A through Z, calling it The Book of Ephraim. It appeared in the collection Divine Comedies (Atheneum), which won the Pulitzer Prize for Poetry in 1977.

At the time he believed he had exhausted the inspiration provided by the ouija board. The "spirits", he believed, thought otherwise, however, "ordering" Merrill to write and publish further installments, Mirabell: Books of Number in 1978 (which won the National Book Award for Poetry) and Scripts for the Pageant in 1980. The complete three-volume work, with a brief additional coda, appeared in one book titled The Changing Light at Sandover in 1982. Sandover received the National Book Critics Circle Award in 1983.

== Impersonating the narrative voices of the dead ==
In live readings, Merrill was able to impersonate the narrating voices of (deceased) poet W. H. Auden and late friends Maya Deren and Maria Mitsotáki. He also claimed to give voice to otherworldly spirits including a first-century Jew named Ephraim, and Mirabell (a ouija board guide).

Merrill and his last partner, actor Peter Hooten, adapted the poem for a live ensemble reading at the Agassiz Theatre at Radcliffe College in 1990, a performance filmed and released as "Voices from Sandover". Acclaimed Polish actress Elżbieta Czyżewska played the role of Greek socialite Maria Mitsotáki.

Writer Alison Lurie, a longtime friend of Merrill and Jackson, described her feelings about the creative genesis of the poem in her memoir Familiar Spirits (2001).
