= Lost in Translation (poem) =

Poem by James Merrill

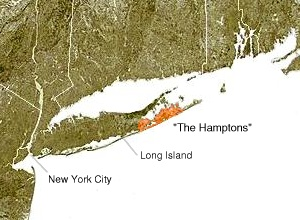
James Merrill's childhood home was a 50-room mansion called "The Orchard," located in Southampton, New York

"Lost in Translation" is a narrative poem by James Merrill (1926–1995), one of the most studied and celebrated of his shorter works. It was originally published in The New Yorker magazine on April 8, 1974, and published in book form in 1976 in Divine Comedies. "Lost in Translation" is Merrill's most anthologized poem.

== Background ==
Merrill wrote in his lifetime mainly for a select group of friends, fans and critics, and expected readers of "Lost in Translation" to have some knowledge of his biography. Born in New York City, Merrill was the son of the founder of the world's largest brokerage firm named Merrill Lynch. He enjoyed a privileged upbringing in economic and cultural terms, although his intelligence and exceptional financial circumstances often made him feel lonely as a child. Merrill was the only son of Charles E. Merrill and Hellen Ingram. (Merrill had two older half siblings from his father's first marriage.)

Given that his parents were often preoccupied, his father with business, his mother with social obligations, Merrill developed a number of close relationships with household staff. "Lost in Translation" describes a profound childhood bond with the woman who taught him French and German. Merrill's parents would divorce in 1939, when Merrill was thirteen years old, in a scandal that was front-page news on the New York Times.

Not only is "Lost in Translation" a poem about a child putting together a jigsaw puzzle, it is an interpretive puzzle, designed to engage a reader's interest in solving mysteries at various narrative levels.

The poem is dedicated to Merrill's friend, the distinguished poet, critic, and translator Richard Howard. It consists of 215 lines with an additional four line epigraph. The poem is mainly in unrhymed pentameter but includes a section in Rubaiyat quatrain stanzas. "Lost in Translation" may be classified as an autobiographical narrative or narrative poem, but is better understood as a series of embedded narratives.

== Epigraph ==
Unusual for Merrill, the poem bears a mysterious four-line epigraph in German (Rilke's translation of the first half of stanza 7 of the poem "Palme" by Valéry), which is printed without translation or attribution:

Diese Tage, die leer dir scheinen
und wertlos für das All,
haben Wurzeln zwischen den Steinen
und trinken dort überall.

Literally translated:

These days, which seem empty to you
and worthless to the universe,
have roots between the stones
and drink everywhere there.

In James Merrill's own English version of this epigraph (published in 1985 in Late Settings), these four lines are translated into English as follows:

These days which, like yourself,
Seem empty and effaced
Have avid roots that delve
To work deep in the waste.

== Synopsis ==
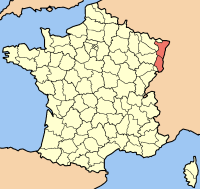
"Mademoiselle does borders...." Merrill's childhood governess was from Alsace, on the border between France and Germany.

At the simplest narrative level, "Lost in Translation" described a young boy (Merrill) eagerly awaiting the arrival of a wooden jigsaw puzzle, assembling it with his governess, then breaking it apart and mailing it back to the puzzle rental company, while retaining one piece of the puzzle in his pocket. Inspired by Omar Khayyam's Rubaiyat quatrains, Merrill describes the puzzle's image as an imaginary harem-like 19th-century Orientalist painting, by an alleged follower of Jean-Léon Gérôme, that begins to appear as the puzzle pieces are put together. When the puzzle is nearly done, the piece that was missing the whole time is found under the table at the boy's feet. The missing piece is, in fact, an image of a boy's feet. When it is put in place, the portrait of the little boy in the puzzle is finally complete.

In "Lost in Translation", the narrator's puzzle-making companion is his French governess, whom he repeatedly refers to as Mademoiselle. Part mother, part teacher, part nanny, part servant, she is described by Merrill as "stout, plain, carrot-haired, devout".

At one point in the poem, Mademoiselle speaks the same phrase in French and in German. In addition to playing with the boy's marionettes and doing jigsaw puzzles with him, Mademoiselle is teaching the young James Merrill languages which would be critical to making him the sophisticated and urbane lyric poet of later life. By giving name, in several languages, to objects and tasks around the home, Mademoiselle helps the young James Merrill come to understand a doubleness about language itself, that objects and activities can have different names and connotations across languages.

From the child's point of view, the "puzzle" goes well beyond what is taking place on the card table. Merrill is puzzling through the mystery of his existence, puzzling through the mystery of what the world is, what objects are, what people do in life. An unspoken puzzle is solved when the young Merrill determines what his relationship to Mademoiselle is, given the frequent absence of his own mother. Mademoiselle knows "her place", he writes, indicating his first consciousness of his own class privilege, as well as (perhaps) the limits placed on Mademoiselle's maternal role.

Yet other puzzles are not solved until later in life. At one point the narrator's voice modulates into that of an adult. We find out that Mademoiselle hid her true origins from the boy (and from his family) because of the political tensions leading up to 1939 and to the outbreak of World War II. Mademoiselle claimed to be French and hid her German or Alsatian birth. She presumably gained a French family name through marriage to a soldier who died in the Battle of Verdun in World War I (1914–1918). Mademoiselle could let no one know she was German for fear of losing her job and her employers' trust. This explains the fact that Merrill's own French, learned in imitation of his governess, was always spoken with a slight German accent.

The poem includes several secondary narratives that involve the adult Merrill. A scene years later in which a mentalist determines that the contents of a sealed box is a single wooden jigsaw puzzle piece. The discovery of Mademoiselle's hidden history after a chance conversation with Mademoiselle's grown nephew, a United Nations interpreter, who tells him the story of the governess's true origins. The futile search in Athens for Rilke's German translation of Valéry's French poem "Palme". "Palme", which describes the slow growth of a date palm in a desert as an image of nobility of character, is referenced repeatedly in "Lost in Translation".
