= Lynne McMahon =

American poet

- Education: University of Utah (PhD)
- Occupation: Poet

Lynne McMahon is an American poet.

She graduated from University of Utah with a PhD in 1982. She teaches at University of Missouri, Her work has appeared in The New York Times Book Review, New Virginia Review, American Poetry Review, The Southern Review, The New Yorker, The Atlantic Monthly, The Nation, Partisan Review, Poetry, The New Republic, Rolling Stone, The Yale Review, The New England Review and The Paris Review.

== Awards ==
- Award for Literary Excellence from the American Academy of Arts and Letters
- 1995 Guggenheim Fellowship
- Ingram Merrill Foundation fellowship
- Missouri Arts Council grant

== Works ==
- "On Deciding To Fire My Chiropractor", Slate, Jan. 28, 2003
- "Birthday Poem", The Nation
- "Convalescence", The American Poetry Review Vol. 18 No. 3
- Faith (Wesleyan University Press, 1988) ISBN 978-0-8195-2133-0
- Devolution of the Nude (David R. Godine, 1993) ISBN 978-0-87923-955-8
- The House of Entertaining Science (David R. Godine, 1999) ISBN 978-1-56792-106-9
- Sentimental Standards (David R. Godine, 2004) ISBN 9781567922578

=== Anthologies ===
- "We Take Our Children to Ireland", Poets of the New Century, Editors Roger Weingarten, Richard Higgerson, David R. Godine Publisher, 2001, ISBN 978-1-56792-177-9
- "We Take Our Children to Ireland", The Best American Poetry 2000, Editors Rita Dove, David Lehman, Simon and Schuster, 2000, ISBN 978-0-7432-0033-2
- "Barbie's Ferrari", Poetry 180: a turning back to poetry, Editor Billy Collins, Random House Trade Paperbacks, 2003, ISBN 978-0-8129-6887-3
- "Wedding Ring", 180 more: extraordinary poems for every day, Editor Billy Collins, Random House, Inc., 2005, ISBN 978-0-8129-7296-2
- "Not Falling", The extraordinary tide: new poetry by American women, Editors Susan Aizenberg, Erin Belieu, Jeremy Countryman, Columbia University Press, 2001, ISBN 978-0-231-11963-4
