= Ellen Akins =

American novelist

- Born: South Bend, Indiana, U.S.
- Education: University of Southern California (BA); Johns Hopkins University (MFA)
- Occupation: Novelist

Ellen Akins is an American novelist from South Bend, Indiana.

== Early life and education ==
After graduating from LaSalle Intermediate Academy in 1977, Akins earned a Bachelor of Arts in film production at the University of Southern California. As a young adult, Akins participated in Beyond Our Control, a youth-produced community television program.

== Career ==
Akins worked with film producer Sydney Pollack before losing interest in the film business. Akins then earned a Master of Fine Arts in the creative writing program at Johns Hopkins University. In April 1993, she was awarded the Academy Award of the American Academy of Arts and Letters for her fiction writing; she has also been given grants by the National Endowment for the Arts and the Ingram Merrill Foundation, and won the Whiting Award in 1989.

Akins is the author of five books; the novels Home Movie, published in 1988 by Simon & Schuster, Little Woman, published in 1990 by Harper & Row, Public Life, published in 1993 by HarperCollins, and Hometown Brew, published by Alfred A. Knopf in 1998, and the short story collection "World Like a Knife", published in 1991 by Johns Hopkins University Press. Akins has also taught at Western Michigan University, Northland College, and Fairleigh Dickinson University.

== Personal life ==
Akins lives in Cornucopia, Wisconsin.

== Awards ==
- 1989 Whiting Award
- 1993 Academy Award from the American Academy of Arts and Letters

== Works ==
=== Books ===
- Home Movie. Simon & Schuster. 1988. ISBN 978-0-67166-135-9.
- Little Woman. Harpercollins. 1990. ISBN 978-0-06016-362-4.
- World Like a Knife. The Johns Hopkins University Press. 1991. ISBN 978-0-80184-288-7.
- Public Life. Harpercollins. 1993. ISBN 978-0-06016-753-0.
- Hometown Brew. Knopf. 1998. ISBN 978-0-67944-795-5.

=== Stories ===
- "Something You Won't Understand". The Southern Review. Winter. LSU Press. 1985.
- "Nobody's Baby". The Southern Review. Autumn. LSU Press. 1991.
- "A Modest Appetite". Perigree: Publication for the Arts. 2009. Archived from the original on 28 October 2012.
- "Her Delivery". Serving House Journal (2). Fall 2010.
