= Robert Siegel (author) =

American poet

- Born: 18 August 1939; Oak Park, Illinois, Illinois, United States
- Died: 20 December 2012 (aged 73); South Berwick, Maine
- Occupations: Poet, novelist
- Writing career
- Period: 1973–2012
- Genres: poetry, children's literature, YA Fiction
- Subjects: nature, mythology, spirituality
- Notable works: The Waters Under the Earth (poems); Whalesong (children's novel)

Robert Harold Siegel (born 18 August 1939 in Oak Park, Illinois; died 20 December 2012 in South Berwick, Maine) was an American poet and novelist. He authored four books of poetry and five children's novels.

== Life and career ==
Siegel graduated from Wheaton College in 1961, and received an MA in writing from Johns Hopkins University and a PhD in English literature from Harvard University. He was a professor at Dartmouth College, Princeton University, and Goethe University in Frankfurt, Germany, and directed the graduate creative writing program for 23 years at the University of Wisconsin–Milwaukee, where he was professor emeritus of English until his death. His poetry has received awards from the National Endowment for the Arts, the Ingram Merrill Foundation, Poetry, Transatlantic Review, and he has been nominated twice for The Pushcart Prize for Poetry. His children's fiction includes the award-winning Whalesong trilogy, which has been translated into seven languages.

He lived in Maine, where he died of cancer in December 2012.

== List of works ==
Poetry:

- 1973 "The Beasts & The Elders"
- 1980 "In a Pig's Eye"
- 2005 "The Waters Under the Earth"
- 2006 "A Pentecost of Finches: New and Selected Poems"
- 2013 "Within This Tree of Bones: New and Selected Poems"

Children's Literature:

- 1975 A Tale Whose Time Has Come
- 1980 Alpha Centauri
- 1981 Whalesong, Crossways Books
- 1982 The Kingdom of Wundle
- 1994 White Whale
- 1994 The Ice at the End of the World
