= Thomas Bolt =

American fiction writer and poet

- Born: November 21, 1959; Washington, D.C., U.S.
- Died: January 21, 2025; Toronto, Canada
- Education: Corcoran School of Art; University of Virginia
- Writing career
- Genres: Fiction and Poetry

Thomas Bolt (born 1959 in Washington, D.C.) was an American fiction writer, poet, and artist.

== Life ==
He attended public and private schools. He was a pre-college scholarship student at the Corcoran School of Art and received a B.A. in English (cum laude) and Art from the University of Virginia.

His paintings have been shown in group exhibitions in New York. Land (1982), a hand-printed book of his poems and etchings, is in the rare book collections of the Library of Congress and the University of Virginia.

His poems have appeared in The Paris Review, BOMB, and Southwest Review (where his long poem, "Wedgwood," won an award for the best poem the quarterly published in 1994).

His short stories and novel excerpts have appeared in BOMB, n+1, Epiphany, and in The O. Henry Prize Stories, 2018.

He read from his work in New York (with n+1 at the Ace Hotel, at Mad Alex Presents, the Limbo Reading Series, the Poetry Society of America, the Alliance Stage Poets' Reading Series, and the Poetry Center of the 92nd Street Y), and in Rome (at the Villa Aurelia). He lived in Toronto.

== Awards ==
- O. Henry Prize Winner, 2018
- Rome Prize for Literature of the American Academy of Arts and Letters
- Yale Younger Poets Prize
- The Peter I. B. Lavin Younger Poet Award of the American Academy of Poets
- Ingram Merrill Fellowship
- 1997 Artist's Fellowship from the New York Foundation for the Arts

== Works ==
- Thomas Bolt, BOMB, Issue 45 Fall 1993
- At the Motel of the Villa of the Mysteries, Literary Imagination 2005 7: 258-261
- Thomas Bolt, Southwest Review Vol. 82, No. 4 1997
- Thomas Bolt, Epiphany Issue 9, Spring-Summer 2011
- Thomas Bolt, n+1 Issue 27, Winter 2017
- Thomas Bolt, n+1 Issue 30, Winter 2018
- Thomas Bolt, n+1 Issue 44, Winter 2023
- Thomas Bolt, n+1 Online Only, September 1, 2017

=== Books ===
- Out of the Woods. Yale University Press. 1989. ISBN 978-0-300-04469-0. "Thomas Bolt."
- Dark Ice, 1993–1997, a poem of 1,001 lines with notes and parodies of notes, was first published in BOMB in the fall of 1993. https://bombmagazine.org/articles/1993/10/01/dark-ice/ | https://tbolt.com/di2/di_tp.html
- Dark Ice on Zembla hypertext and ASCII version on NABOKV-L

== Anthologies ==
- The O. Henry Prize Stories 2018. Anchor Books. 2018. ISBN 9780525436584.
- 1971 Pontiac LeMans, The Paris Review, No. 109, Winter 1988
- Sixty Years of American Poetry (Harry N. Abrams, New York, 1996).
- "A Cluster of Sunsets," in the Autumn 1997 issue of Southwest Review
- Two Poems, The Paris Review, No. 154, Spring 2000

== Collaborations ==
- Nightmaze, Thomas Bolt & Sebastian Currier, "a 45-minute multimedia work with narrator, chamber ensemble, and highway signs, performed in New York, Philadelphia, and Chicago"

- Nightmass, Sebastian Currier, with "Incertum" text by Thomas Bolt.

== Interviews ==
- James Merrill, Thomas Bolt, BOMB Magazine, Issue 36 Summer 1991
- NABOKV-L Interview with Thomas Bolt, author of DARK ICE, Donald Barton Johnson, NABOKV-L post 0002539, Mon, 3 Nov 1997 08:44:20 -0800
- Donald Antrim, Thomas Bolt, BOMB Magazine, Issue 58 Winter 1997
- Brian Boyd, Thomas Bolt, BOMB Magazine, Issue 71 Spring 2000

== Reviews ==
Publishers Weekly:

Bolt handles his subject matter with admirable attention to detail and precision of language; he ranges easily from adjective-replete accounts to stark, minimalist statements
