= Judith Moffett =

American author and academic (born 1942)

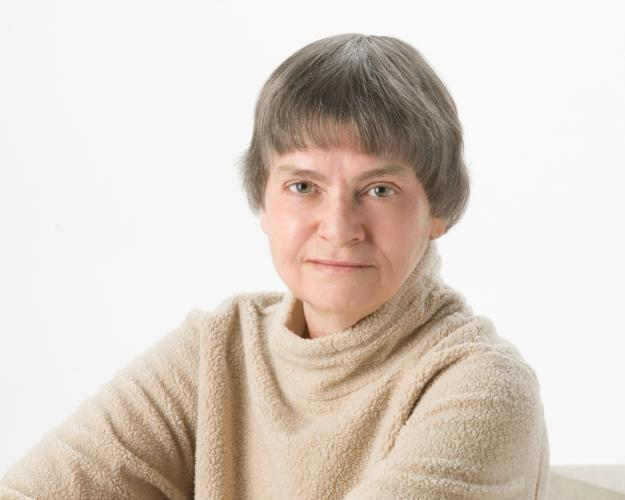
- Author Photo by Mark Kidd Studios, 2008
- Born: 1942 (age 83–84); Kentucky, U.S.
- Occupation: Author
- Writing career
- Subjects: Poetry, Science fiction, Literary criticism
- Website: www.judithmoffett.com

Judith Moffett (born 1942) is an American author and academic. She has published poetry, non-fiction, science fiction, and translations of Swedish literature. She has been awarded grants and fellowships from the National Endowment for the Arts and the National Endowment for the Humanities and presented a paper on the translation of poetry at a 1998 Nobel Symposium.

She began her career writing poetry and about poets, including a 1984 book about James Merrill, who was both her friend and mentor. Moffett still writes for organizations such as the Academy of American Poets. She did not publish science fiction until 1986, but gained almost immediate attention by winning the first Theodore Sturgeon Award in 1987. Her first novel, Pennterra (1987), further enhanced her reputation. It is noted both for its treatment of alien sexuality and as an example of Quakers in science fiction. In the following year, 1988, she won the John W. Campbell Award for Best New Writer in Science Fiction. In 1989 her novella Tiny Tango also received award nominations.

== Bibliography ==
=== Novels ===
- Pennterra (Congdon & Weed, 1987; reprint edition, Fantastic Books, 2009; ebook editions: SF Gateway/Orion Publishing Group, 2015)
- The Ragged World (Holy Ground Trilogy, Book 1, St. Martin's Press, 1991; ebook editions: SF Gateway/Orion Publishing Group, 2015)
- Time, Like an Ever-Rolling Stream (Holy Ground Trilogy, Book 2, St. Martin's Press, 1992; ebook editions: SF Gateway/Orion Publishing Group, 2015)
- The Bird Shaman (Holy Ground Trilogy, Book 3, Bascom Hill Publishing Group, 2008; ebook editions: SF Gateway/Orion Publishing Group, 2015)
- Holy Ground Trilogy: The Ragged World; Time, Like an Every-Rolling Stream; and The Bird Shaman in new, matching trade editions (Fairwood Press, 2026)

=== Collections ===
- Keeping Time: Poems (LSU Press, 1976, poems)
- Whinny Moor Crossing (Princeton University Press, 1984, poems)
- Two that Came True (Pulphouse Publishing, Author's Choice Monthly #19, 1991, science-fiction stories; ebook edition: SF Gateway/Orion Publishing Group, 2015)
- Tarzan in Kentucky (David Robert Books, 2015, poems)
- The Bear's Baby and Other Stories (SF Gateway/Orion Publishing Group, 2017, ebook edition, short stories)

=== Chapbooks ===
- Tiny Tango (Amazon Digital Publishing ebook, 2014)

=== Translations from the Swedish ===
- Gentleman, Single, Refined and Selected Poems, 1937-1959 by Hjalmar Gullberg (LSU Press, 1979)
- The North! To The North! Five Swedish Poets of the Nineteenth Century (Southern Illinois University Press, 2001)

=== Short stories ===
- "After Three Wordsworths" (Shenandoah, March 1980)
- "Surviving" (F&SF, June 1986)
- "The Hob" (Asimov's, May 1988)
- "Tiny Tango" (Asimov's, February 1989)
- "Not Without Honor" (Asimov's, May 1989)
- "Remembrance of Things Future" (Asimov's, December 1989)
- "I, Said the Cow" (F&SF, January 1990)
- "Final Tomte" (F&SF, June 1990)
- "The Ragged Rock" (Asimov's, December 1990)
- "Chickasaw Slave" (Asimov's, September 1991) (collected in Mike Resnick's anthology Alternate Presidents in 1992)
- "The Realms of Glory" (Heaven Sent, Peter Crowther and Martin H. Greenberg, eds, DAW Books, 1995)
- "The Bradshaw" (F&SF, October 1998)
- "The Bear's Baby" (F&SF, October/November 2003)
- "The Bird Shaman's Girl" (F&SF, October/November 2007)
- "The Middle of Somewhere" (Welcome to the Greenhouse, Gordon Van Gelder, ed, OR Books, 2011)
- "Ten Lights and Darks" (F&SF, January/February 2013)
- "Space Ballet" (Tor.com, February 4, 2014)

=== Non-fiction ===
- "The Habit of Imagining" (essay about The Golden Rule, The Christian Century, Vol. 92, December 24, 1975)
- James Merrill: An Introduction to the Poetry (Columbia University Press, 1984)
- "Confessions of a Metamorph" (essay, The Kenyon Review, New Series, Vol. 15, Fall 1993)
- Homestead Year: Back to the Land in Suburbia (Lyons & Burford, 1995; revised trade paperback edition, iUniverse, 2011)
- "Days of 1973: A Week in Athens" (an excerpt from a James Merrill memoir, Notre Dame Review, Summer/Fall 2012)
- "Strange Attractor: On James Merrill (and myself) in and out of the classroom," The Smart Set, Drexel University, 07/23/2015
- "Mixed Messages" (an excerpt from Unlikely Friends: A Memoir; begins on page 17 at the link)
- Unlikely Friends - James Merrill and Judith Moffett: A Memoir (Amazon Digital Services, 2019; ebook and print editions)

== Awards, honors, and recognitions ==
- 1967 Fulbright Teaching Fellowship to the University of Lund, Sweden
- 1971 First prize, Graduate Division, in the Academy of American Poets Contest at the University of Pennsylvania
- 1973 Fulbright Travel Grant to Sweden
- 1973 Eunice Tietjens Prize from Poetry magazine
- 1976 First Ingram Merrill Foundation Grant in poetry
- 1976 Levinson Prize from Poetry magazine
- 1978 Columbia University Translation Center Award
- 1980 Second Ingram Merrill Foundation Grant
- 1981 Poem "Scatsquall in Spring" included in Pushcart IV: Best of the Small Presses annual collection
- 1982 Annual Translation Prize of the Swedish Academy
- 1983 National Endowment for the Humanities Translation Grant
- 1984 National Endowment for the Arts Creative Writing Fellowship Grant
- 1987 "Surviving": won the Theodore Sturgeon Memorial Award; also a finalist for the 1986 Nebula Award for Best Novelette
- 1988 Received the John W. Campbell Award for Best New Writer at the World Science Fiction Convention in New Orleans
- 1989 "The Hob": a finalist for the 1988 Nebula Award for Best Novelette
- 1990 "Tiny Tango": a finalist for the 1989 Nebula Award and the 1990 Hugo Award for Best Novella
- 1991 Third Ingram Merrill Foundation Grant for poetry and translation
- 1991 The Ragged World: a New York Times Notable Book
- 1992 Time, Like an Ever-Rolling Stream: a New York Times Notable Book and shortlisted for the James Tiptree Jr. Award
- 1994 Translation grant from the Swedish Academy
- 1998 Presenter at the Nobel Symposium on Translation of Poetry and Poetic Prose
- 1999 One-year stipend from the Swedish Authors' Fund
- 2015 Presenter, "Mixed Messages" (an excerpt from Unlikely Friends: A Memoir), at the James Merrill Symposium, Washington University in St. Louis

== See also ==
- American literature
- List of American writers
