= James Merrill =

American poet (1926–1995)

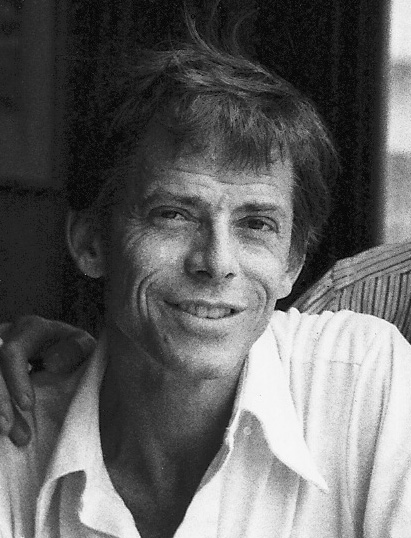
- Merrill in 1973
- Born: James Ingram Merrill; March 3, 1926; New York City, US
- Died: February 6, 1995 (aged 68); Tucson, Arizona, US
- Education: Amherst College (BA)
- Occupation: Poet
- Partner(s): David Jackson; Peter Hooten
- Parent: Charles E. Merrill (father)
- Relatives: Charles E. Merrill, Jr. (brother); Peter Magowan (nephew)
- Writing career
- Genre: American poetry
- Notable works: The Changing Light at Sandover, Divine Comedies, Nights and Days
- Notable awards: Pulitzer Prize for Poetry, National Book Award, Bollingen Prize

James Ingram Merrill (March 3, 1926 – February 6, 1995) was an American poet. He was awarded the Pulitzer Prize for poetry in 1977 for Divine Comedies. His poetry falls into two distinct bodies of work: the polished and formalist lyric poetry of his early career, and the epic narrative of occult communication with spirits and angels, titled The Changing Light at Sandover (published in three volumes from 1976 to 1980), which dominated his later career. Although most of his published work was poetry, he also wrote essays, fiction, and plays.

== Early life ==
James Ingram Merrill was born in New York City, to Charles E. Merrill (1885–1956), the founding partner of the Merrill Lynch investment firm, and Hellen Ingram Merrill (1898–2000), a society reporter and publisher from Jacksonville, Florida. He was born at a residence which later was the site of the Greenwich Village townhouse explosion, which Merrill lamented in the poem "18 West 11th Street" (1972).

Merrill's parents married in 1925, the year before he was born; he grew up with two older half siblings from his father's first marriage, Doris Merrill Magowan and Charles E. Merrill, Jr. As a boy, Merrill enjoyed a highly privileged upbringing in educational and economic terms. His father's 30-acre estate in Southampton, New York, for example, known as "The Orchard," had been designed by Stanford White with landscaping by Frederick Law Olmsted. (The property was developed in 1980 with 29 luxury condominiums flanking the central gardens, while the home's vast ballroom and first-floor public reception areas were preserved.) Merrill's childhood governess taught him French and German, an experience Merrill wrote about in his 1974 poem "Lost in Translation". From 1936 to 1938, Merrill attended St. Bernard's, a prestigious New York grammar school.

"I found it difficult to believe in the way my parents lived. They seemed so utterly taken up with engagements, obligations, ceremonies," Merrill would tell an interviewer in 1982. "The excitement, the emotional quickening I felt in those years came usually through animals or nature, or through the servants in the house ... whose lives seemed by contrast to make such perfect sense. The gardeners had their hands in the earth. The cook was dredging things with flour, making pies. My father was merely making money, while my mother wrote names on place-cards, planned menus, and did her needlepoint." Merrill's parents separated when he was eleven, then divorced when he was thirteen. As a teenager, Merrill boarded at the Lawrenceville School, where he befriended future novelist Frederick Buechner, began writing poetry, and undertook early literary collaborations. When Merrill was 16 years old, his father collected his short stories and poems and published them as a surprise under the name Jim's Book. Initially pleased, Merrill would later regard the precocious book as an embarrassment. Today, copies are considered literary treasures worth thousands of dollars.

== The Black Swan ==
The Black Swan
Black on flat water past the jonquil lawns
Riding, the black swan draws
A private chaos warbling in its wake,
Assuming, like a fourth dimension, splendor
That calls the child with white ideas of swans
Nearer to that green lake
Where every paradox means wonder.

— James Merrill (1946)

Merrill was drafted in 1944 into the United States Army and served for eight months. His studies interrupted by war and military service, Merrill returned to Amherst College in 1945 and graduated summa cum laude and Phi Beta Kappa in 1947. Merrill's senior thesis on French novelist Marcel Proust heralded his literary talent, and his English professor upon reading it declared to the Amherst graduating class that Jim (as he was known there) was "destined for some sort of greatness." The Black Swan, a collection of poems Merrill's Amherst professor (and lover) Kimon Friar published privately in Athens, Greece, in 1946, was printed in just one hundred copies when Merrill was 20 years old. Merrill's first mature work, The Black Swan is among Merrill's scarcest titles. Merrill's first commercially published volume was First Poems, issued in 990 numbered copies by Alfred A. Knopf in 1951.

== A Different Person ==
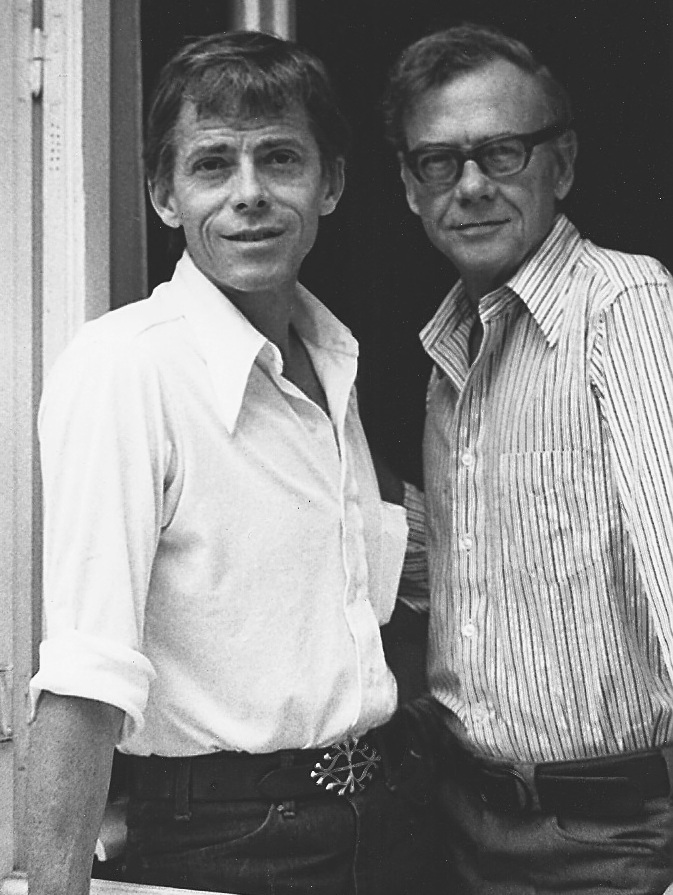
James Merrill and David Jackson in Athens, Greece, October 1973 (photo: Judith Moffett)

Merrill's partner of three decades was David Jackson, a writer and artist. Merrill and Jackson met in New York City after a performance of Merrill's play The Bait at the Comedy Club in 1953. (Poet Dylan Thomas and playwright Arthur Miller walked out of the performance.) Together, Jackson and Merrill moved to Stonington, Connecticut in 1955, purchasing a property at 107 Water Street (now the site of writer-in-residency program, the James Merrill House, which until 2024 was sponsored by the Stonington Village Improvement Association in Stonington Borough, and is now part of the James Merrill House Foundation). For most of two decades, the couple spent winters in Athens at their home at 44 Athinaion Efivon. Greek themes, locales, and characters occupy a prominent position in Merrill's writing. In 1979, Merrill and Jackson largely abandoned Greece and began spending part of each year at Jackson's home in Key West, Florida.

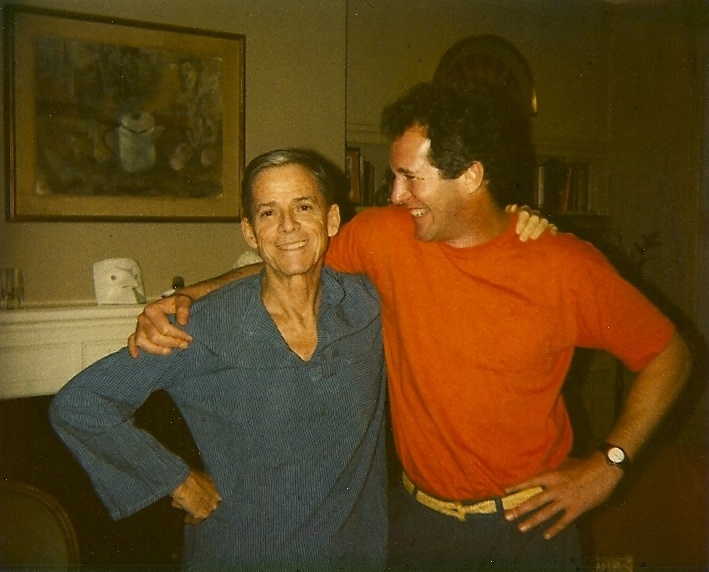
James Merrill with actor Peter Hooten, his partner from 1983 to 1995 (photo: Judith Moffett)

In his 1993 memoir A Different Person, Merrill revealed that he suffered writer's block early in his career and sought psychiatric help to overcome its effects (undergoing analysis with Thomas Detre in Rome). "Freedom to be oneself is all very well," he would write. "The greater freedom is not to be oneself." Merrill painted a candid portrait in his memoir of gay life in the early 1950s, describing friendships and relationships with several men including Dutch poet Hans Lodeizen, Italian journalist Umberto Morra, U.S. writer Claude Fredericks, art dealer Robert Isaacson, David Jackson, and his partner from 1983 onward, actor Peter Hooten.

Cupid
You are one wild boy
For Time to tame, or me to,
Hand in glove with him.

— James Merrill (1965)

== The Ingram Merrill Foundation ==
A correspondent and the keeper of many confidences, Merrill's "chief pleasure was friendship". Answering to "Jim" in his youth and to "James" in published adulthood (and to "JM" in letters from readers), he was called "Jimmy", a childhood nickname, by friends and family until the end of his life. (Before his father's death, Merrill and his two siblings renounced any further inheritance from their father's estate in exchange for $100 "as full quittance"; as a result, most of Charles Merrill's estate was donated to charity, including "The Orchard.")

A philanthropist in his own right, Merrill created the Ingram Merrill Foundation in the 1950s, the name of which united his divorced parents. The private foundation operated throughout the poet's lifetime and subsidized literature, the arts, and public television, with grants directed particularly to writers and artists showing early promise. Merrill met filmmaker Maya Deren in 1945 and the poet Elizabeth Bishop a few years later, giving critical financial assistance to both and providing funds to hundreds of other writers, often anonymously.

Merrill served as a Chancellor of the Academy of American Poets from 1979 until his death. While wintering in Arizona, he died on February 6, 1995, from a heart attack related to HIV/AIDS. His ashes and the remains of David Jackson are buried side by side at Evergreen Cemetery, Stonington. Jackson's former wife and Merrill's friend, Doris Sewell Jackson is buried behind them.

In tribute to Merrill, The New Yorker republished his 1962 poem, "The Mad Scene", in its March 19, 1995 edition.

== Awards ==
Beginning with the prestigious Glascock Prize, awarded for The Black Swan when he was an undergraduate, Merrill would go on to receive every major poetry award in the United States, including the 1977 Pulitzer Prize for Poetry for Divine Comedies. Merrill was honored in mid-career with the Bollingen Prize in 1973.

Merrill received the National Book Critics Circle Award in 1983 for his epic poem The Changing Light at Sandover (composed partly of supposedly supernatural messages received via the use of a Ouija board). In 1990, he received the first Bobbitt National Prize for Poetry awarded by the Library of Congress for The Inner Room. He garnered the National Book Award for Poetry twice, in 1967 for Nights and Days and in 1979 for Mirabell: Books of Number. He was elected a Fellow of the American Academy of Arts and Sciences in 1978. In 1991, he received the Golden Plate Award of the American Academy of Achievement.

== Style ==
But you were everywhere beside me, masked,
As who was not, in laughter, pain, and love.

— James Merrill, "Days of 1964"

A writer of elegance and wit, highly adept at wordplay and puns, Merrill was a master of traditional poetic meter and form who also wrote a good deal of free and blank verse. (Asked once if he would prefer a more popular readership, Merrill replied "Think what one has to do to get a mass audience. I'd rather have one perfect reader. Why dynamite the pond in order to catch that single silver carp?") Though not generally considered a Confessionalist poet, James Merrill made frequent use of personal relationships to fuel his "chronicles of love & loss" (as the speaker in Mirabell called his work). The divorce of Merrill's parents — the sense of disruption, followed by a sense of seeing the world "doubled" or in two ways at once — figures prominently in the poet's verse. Merrill did not hesitate to alter small autobiographical details to improve a poem's logic, or to serve an environmental, aesthetic, or spiritual theme.

As Merrill matured, the polished and taut brilliance of his early work yielded to a more informal, relaxed, and conversational tone. Already established in the 1970s among the finest poets of his generation, Merrill made a surprising detour when he began incorporating extensive occult messages into his work (although a poem from the 1950s, "Voices from the Other World," foreshadows the practice). The result, a 560-page apocalyptic epic published as The Changing Light at Sandover (1982), documents two decades of messages dictated from otherworldly spirits during Ouija séances hosted by Merrill and his partner David Jackson. The Changing Light at Sandover is one of the longest epics in any language, and features the voices of recently deceased poet W. H. Auden, Merrill's late friends Maya Deren and Greek socialite Maria Mitsotáki, as well as heavenly beings including the Archangel Michael. Channeling voices through a Ouija board "made me think twice about the imagination," Merrill later explained. "If the spirits aren't external, how astonishing the mediums become! Victor Hugo said of his voices that they were like his own mental powers multiplied by five."

In Langdon Hammer's James Merrill: Life and Art, Hammer quoted Alison Lurie's writing of her experience with the Ouija board in Familiar Spirits: A Memoir of James Merrill and David Jackson as:

a game that got badly out of control ... couldn't tell what was real and what was not ... the board became a form of self-induced demonic possession, to which Merrill, driven by his ambition to make poetry out of spirit messages, was especially susceptible, and in which Jackson was enlisted against his will.

Lurie's response after reading Merrill and Jackson's collaborative effort in The Changing Light at Sandover: "I sometimes had the feeling that my friend's mind was intermittently being taken over by a stupid and possibly even evil intelligence". According to Stoker Hunt, author of Ouija: The Most Dangerous Game, before his death Merrill warned against the use of the Ouija board.

Following the publication of The Changing Light at Sandover, Merrill returned to writing shorter poetry which could be both whimsical and nostalgic: "Self-Portrait in TYVEK Windbreaker" (for example) is a conceit inspired by a windbreaker jacket Merrill purchased from "one of those vaguely imbecile / Emporia catering to the collective unconscious / Of our time and place." The Tyvek windbreaker — "DuPont contributed the seeming-frail, / Unrippable stuff first used for Priority Mail" — is "white with a world map." "A zipper's hiss, and the Atlantic Ocean closes / Over my blood-red T-shirt from the Gap."

== Works by Merrill ==
from The Book of Ephraim:

Maya departs for city, cat, and lover.
The days grow shorter. Summer's over.

We take long walks among the flying leaves
And ponder turnings taken by our lives.

Look at each other closely, as friends will
On parting. This is not farewell,

Not now. Yet something in the sad
End-of-season light remains unsaid.

— James Merrill, The Changing Light at Sandover' (1982)

The cover of The Changing Light at Sandover, a 560-page epic poem published in 1982, shows the ballroom of "The Orchard," James Merrill's childhood home in The Hamptons in the 1930s.

Since his death, Merrill's work has been anthologized in three divisions: Collected Poems, Collected Prose, and Collected Novels and Plays. Accordingly, his work below is divided upon those same lines.

=== Poetry collections ===
- The Black Swan (1946)
- First Poems (1951)
- The Country of a Thousand Years of Peace (1959)
- Water Street (1962)
- Nights and Days (1966)
- The Fire Screen (1969)
- Braving the Elements (1972)
- The Yellow Pages (1974)
- Divine Comedies (1976), with "Lost in Translation" and The Book of Ephraim
- Mirabell: Books of Number (1978)
- Scripts for the Pageant (1980)
- The Changing Light at Sandover (1982). Included in Harold Bloom's Western Canon.

composed of The Book of Ephraim (1976), Mirabell: Books of Number (1978), and Scripts for the Pageant (1980), with an added coda, "The Higher Keys"

- Late Settings (1985)
- The Inner Room (1988)
- A Scattering of Salts (1995)

=== Poetry selections ===
- Selected Poems (London: Chatto & Windus, 1961)
- Two Poems: "From the Cupola" and "The Summer People" (London: Chatto & Windus, 1972)
- Samos (1980), published by Sylvester & Orphanos
- From the First Nine: Poems 1946–1976 (1982). Included in Harold Bloom's Western Canon.
- Selected Poems 1946–1985 (1992)

=== Prose ===
- Recitative (1986) - essays
- A Different Person (1993) - memoir

=== Novels ===
- The Seraglio (1957)
- The (Diblos) Notebook (1965)

=== Drama ===
- The Birthday (1947)
- The Bait (1953; revised 1988)
- The Immortal Husband (1955)
- The Image Maker (Sea Cliff Press, 1986)
- Voices from Sandover (1989; videotaped for commercial release in 1990)

=== Posthumous editions ===
- Collected Poems (2001)
- Collected Novels and Plays (2002)
- Collected Prose (2004)
- The Changing Light at Sandover (with the stage adaptation "Voices from Sandover") (2006)
- Selected Poems (2008)
- James Merrill (2017). Langdon Hammer (ed.). Merrill: Poems. Everyman's Library. ISBN 978-1101907856.
- James Merrill (2018). Stephen Yenser (ed.). The Book of Ephraim. Knopf. ISBN 978-1524711344.
- James Merrill (2021). J. D. McClatchy (ed.). A Whole World: Letters From James Merrill. Knopf. ISBN 978-1101875506.

=== Contributions ===
- Notes on Corot (1960) - Essay in an exhibition catalog from the Art Institute of Chicago: COROT 1796-1875, An Exhibition of His Paintings and Graphic Works, October 6 through November 13, 1960

== Recordings ==
- Reflected Houses (cassette audio recording, 1986)
- The Voice of the Poet: James Merrill (cassette audio book, 1999)

== Works about Merrill ==
- Bauer, Mark. The composite voice : the role of W. B. Yeats in James Merrill's poetry. 2003.
- Harold Bloom, ed. James Merrill (1985)
- Piotr Gwiazda, James Merrill and W.H. Auden: Homosexuality and Poetic Influence (2007)
- Nick Halpern, Everyday and Prophetic: The Poetry of Lowell, Ammons, Merrill and Rich (2003)
- Langdon Hammer, James Merrill: Life and Art (2015) [Review in: The New Yorker, April 13, 2015: http://www.newyorker.com/magazine/2015/04/13/out-of-this-world-books-dan-chiasson]
- David Kalstone, Five Temperaments (1977)
- Ross Labrie, James Merrill (1982)
- David Lehman and Charles Berger, James Merrill: Essays in Criticism (1983)
- Christopher Lu, Nothing to Admire: The Politics of Poetic Satire from Dryden to Merrill (2003)
- Alison Lurie, Familiar Spirits: A Memoir of James Merrill and David Jackson (2000)
- Tim Materer, James Merrill's Apocalypse (2000)
- Brian McHale, The Obligation Toward the Difficult Whole: Postmodern Long Poems (2004)
- Judith Moffett, James Merrill: An Introduction to the Poetry (1984)
- Judith Moffett, Unlikely Friends - James Merrill and Judith Moffett: A Memoir (2019)
- Peter Nickowitz, Rhetoric and Sexuality: The Poetry of Hart Crane, Elizabeth Bishop, and James Merrill (2006)
- Robert Polito, A Reader's Guide to James Merrill's "The Changing Light at Sandover" (1984)
- Guy Rotella, ed. Critical Essays on James Merrill (1996)
- Reena Sastri, James Merrill: Knowing Innocence (2007)
- Selinger, Eric Murphy (Spring 1994). "James Merrill's masks of Eros, masques of love". Contemporary Literature. 35 (1): 30–65. doi:10.2307/1208735. JSTOR 1208735.
- Helen Vendler, Last Looks, Last Books: Stevens, Plath, Lowell, Bishop, Merrill (2010)
- Helen Vendler, The Music of What Happens: Poems, Critics, Writers (1988)
- Helen Vendler, Part of Nature, Part of Us: Modern American Poets (1980)
- Helen Vendler, Soul Says: Recent Poetry (1995)
- Stephen Yenser, The Consuming Myth: The Work of James Merrill (1987)
- Smith, Evans Lansing (2008). James Merrill, Postmodern Magus: Myth and Poetics. University of Iowa Press. ISBN 9781587297649.

== Gallery ==
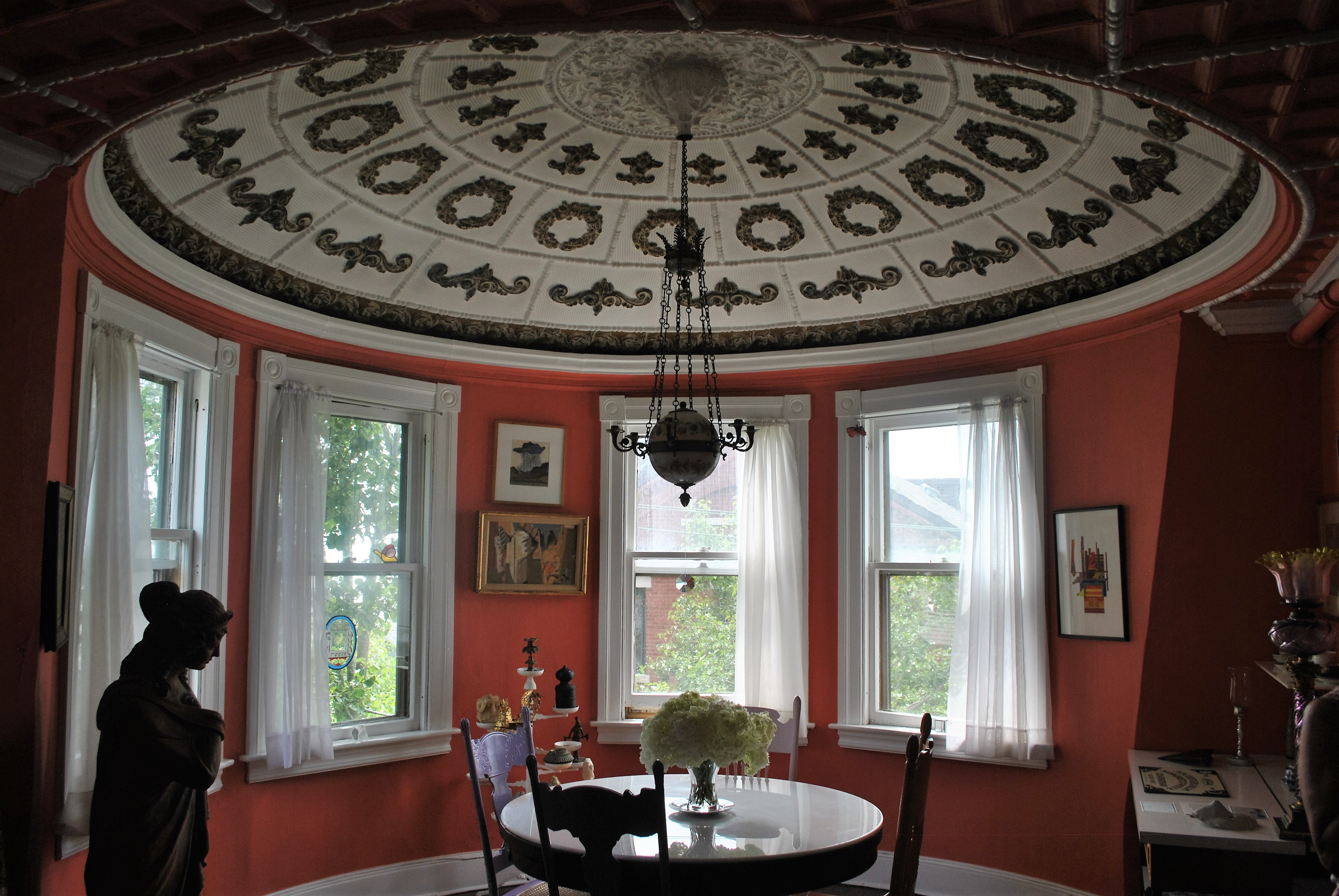
James Merrill House, Stonington, Connecticut

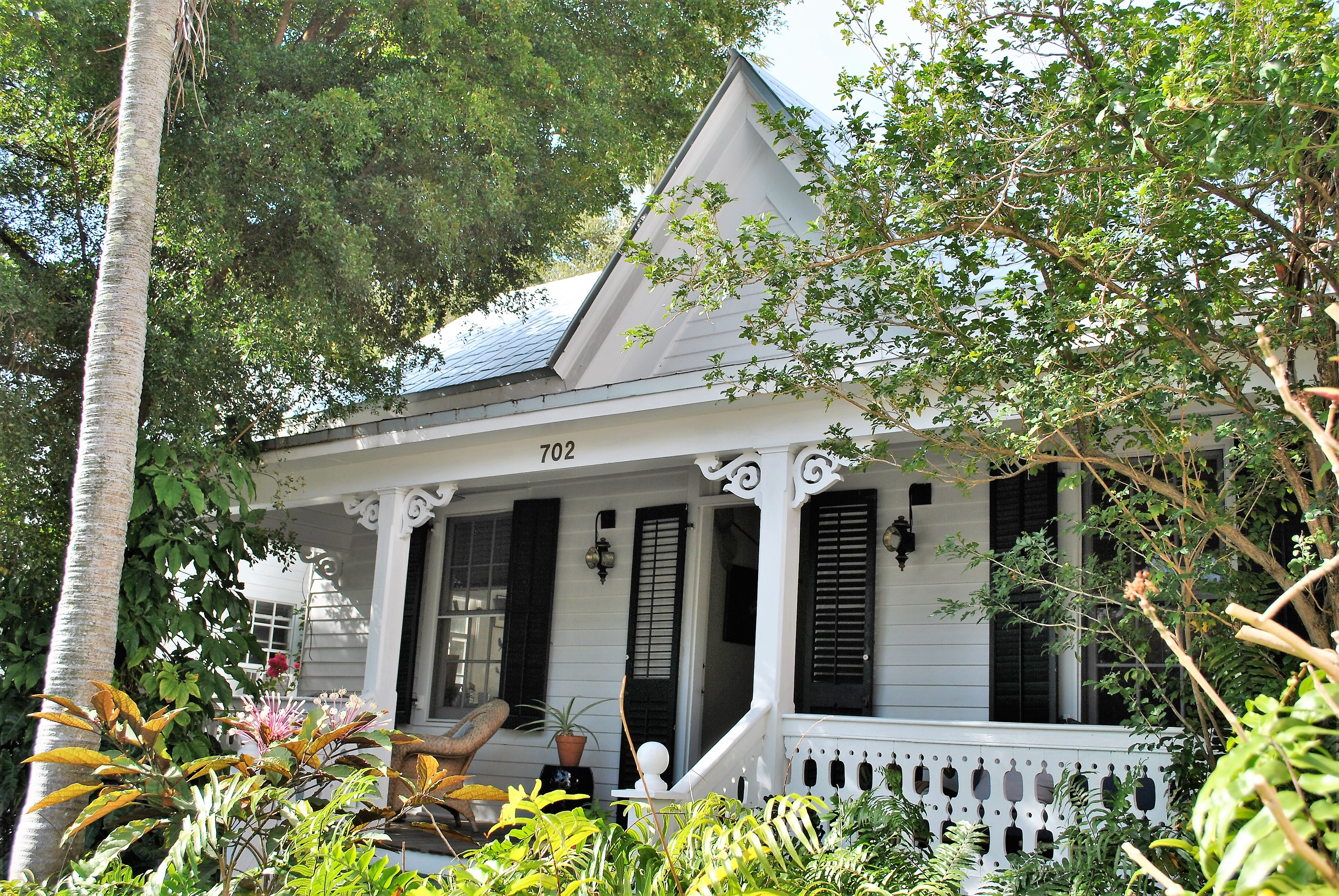
James Merrill and David Jackson House, Key West, Florida

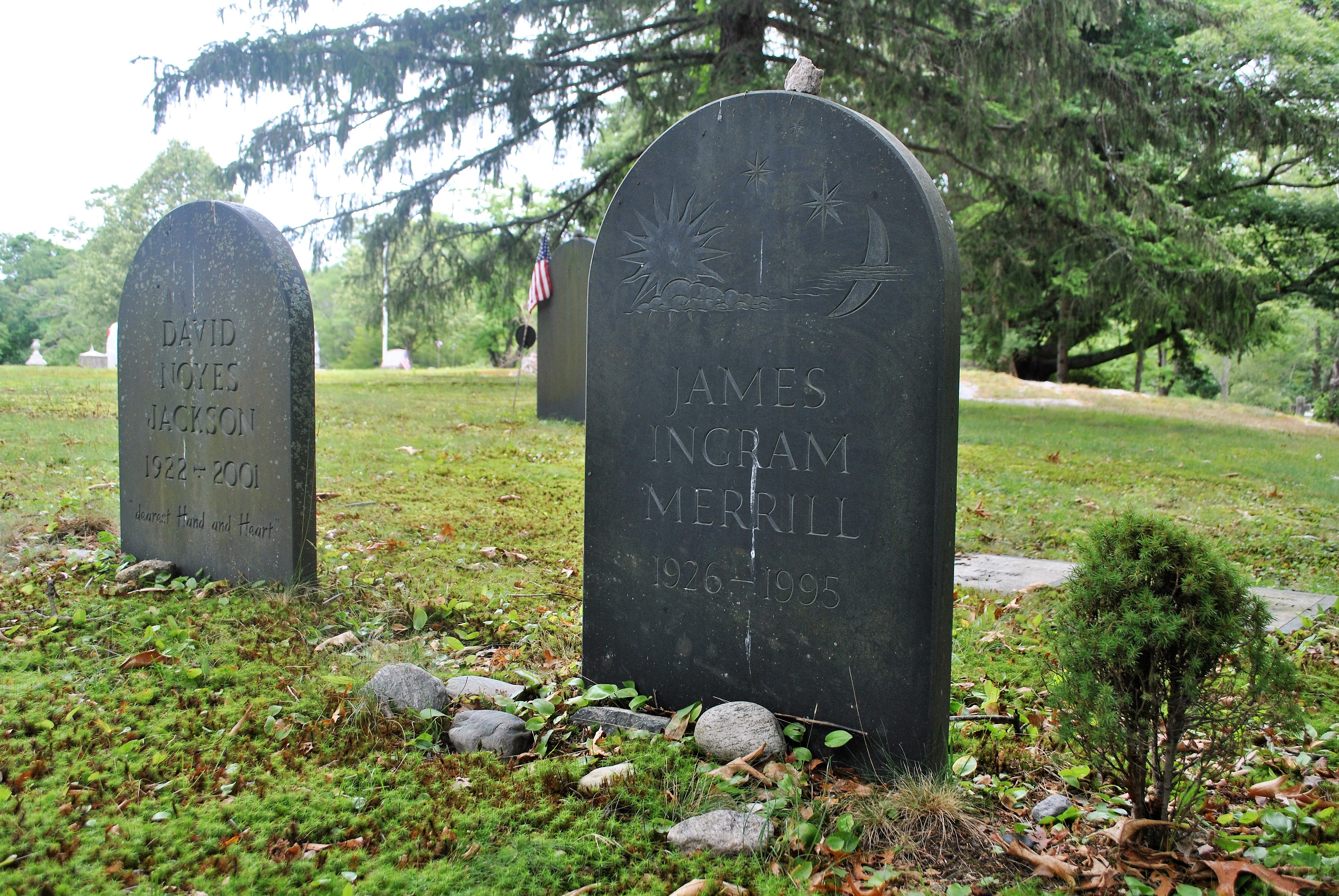
Jackson and Merrill graves, Evergreen Cemetery, Stonington, Connecticut
