= J. D. McClatchy =

American poet, opera librettist and literary critic (1945–2018)

- Born: Joseph Donald McClatchy Jr. August 12, 1945; Bryn Mawr, Pennsylvania, U.S.
- Died: April 10, 2018 (aged 72)
- Education: Georgetown University (BA); Yale University (MA, PhD)
- Writing career
- Genres: poetry; libretto; literary criticism

J. D. "Sandy" McClatchy (August 12, 1945 – April 10, 2018) was an American poet, opera librettist and literary critic. He was editor of the Yale Review and president of the American Academy of Arts and Letters.

== Life ==
McClatchy was born Joseph Donald McClatchy Jr., in Bryn Mawr, Pennsylvania, in 1945. He was educated at Georgetown and Yale, from which he received his Ph.D. in 1974. He lived in Stonington, Connecticut, and New York. His husband was graphic designer Chip Kidd. His partner from 1977 to 1989 was poet Alfred Corn.

== Career ==
McClatchy's poetic work was wide-ranging. He authored six collections of poetry, the fifth of which, Hazmat, was a finalist for the 2003 Pulitzer Prize. He wrote texts for musical settings, including ten opera libretti, for such composers as Michael Dellaira, Elliot Goldenthal, Daron Hagen, Lowell Liebermann, Lorin Maazel, Tobias Picker, Bernard Rands, Ned Rorem, Bruce Saylor, William Schuman and Francis Thorne. His honors include an Award in Literature from the American Academy of Arts and Letters (1991). He also was one of the New York Public Literary Lions, and received the 2000 Connecticut Governor's Arts Award.

McClatchy was affiliated with Yale University, where he was an adjunct professor, fellow of Jonathan Edwards College, and editor of The Yale Review.

In 1999, he was elected into the membership of the American Academy of Arts and Letters, and in January 2009 he was elected its president. He previously served as chancellor of the Academy of American Poets from 1996 until 2003. In addition to these appointments, he was a fellow of the American Academy of Arts and Sciences and received fellowships from the Guggenheim Foundation, the National Endowment for the Arts, and the Academy of American Poets. When he was given an Award in Literature by the American Academy and Institute of Arts and Letters in 1991, the citation read:

J. D. McClatchy is a poet who has emerged into highly distinctive achievement in his third collection, The Rest of the Way. Formally a master, with enormous technical skills, McClatchy writes with an authentic blend of cognitive force and a savage emotional intensity, brilliantly restrained by his care for firm rhetorical control. His increasingly complex sense of our historical overdeterminations is complemented by his concern for adjusting the balance between his own poems and tradition. It may be that no more eloquent poet will emerge in his American generation.

In addition to being literary executor to Anthony Hecht and Mona Van Duyn, McClatchy was also, along with UCLA professor and poet Stephen Yenser, co-executor for the literary estate of James Merrill.

== Bibliography ==
=== Poetry ===
Collections

- Scenes from Another Life (Braziller, 1981)
- Stars Principal (Macmillan, 1986)
- The Rest of the Way (Knopf, 1992)
- Ten Commandments (Random House, 120 pages, December 1999)
- Hazmat (Alfred A. Knopf: Random House, 96 pages, April 2004)
- Division of Spoils: Selected Poems (Arc, 2003)
- Mercury Dressing: Poems (Knopf, 2009)
- Seven Mozart Librettos: A Verse Translation (W. W. Norton, 2010)
- Plundered Hearts: New and Selected Poems (Knopf, 2016)

Anthologies (edited)

- The Vintage Book of Contemporary World Poetry (Random House, 654 pages, May 1996)
- Christmas Poems ed. John Hollander and J. D. McClatchy (Random House, cloth, 256 pages, October 1999)
- Love Speaks Its Name: Gay and Lesbian Love Poems (Random House, 256 pages, May 2001)
- Poems of the Sea (Random House, 256 pages, November 2001)
- The Vintage Book of Contemporary American Poetry, 2nd ed. (Vintage Books: Random House, 736 pages, April 2003)

Poems

- "Dirty snow", The New Yorker, February 22, 2016

=== Non-fiction ===
- White Paper (Columbia University Press, 1989)
- Twenty Questions (Columbia University Press, 200 pages, February 1998)
- American Writers at Home, photographs by Erica Lennard (Library of America, 240 pages, October 2004)

As editor

- Poets on Painters: Essays on the Art of Painting by Twentieth-Century Poets (Berkeley: University of California Press, 1988)
- Henry Wadsworth Longfellow: Poems and Other Writings (Library of America, 854 pages, August 2000)
- Bright Pages: Yale Writers, 1701–2001 (Yale University Press, 540 pages, April 2001)
- Collected Poems by James Merrill ed. Stephen Yenser and J. D. McClatchy (Alfred A. Knopf: Random House, 912 pages, November 2002)
- Allen Ginsberg: The Voice of the Poet (Random House, March 2004)
- Frank O'Hara: The Voice of the Poet (Random House, March 2004)
- W. H. Auden: The Voice of the Poet (Random House, March 2004)
- Horace, the Odes: New Translations by Contemporary Poets by Horace, ed. J. D. McClatchy and Nicholas Jenkins (Princeton University Press, 320 pages, April 2005)
- Poets of the Civil War (Library of America, 250 pages, April 2005)
- The Changing Light at Sandover: A Poem by James Merrill, ed. J. D. McClatchy and Stephen Yenser (Alfred A. Knopf: Random House, 608 pages, February 2006)
- Thornton Wilder: Collected Plays and Writings on Theater (Library of America, 800 pages, March 2007)
- Thornton Wilder: The Bridge of San Luis Rey and Other Novels 1926–1948 (Library of America, 750 pages, September 2009)
- Thornton Wilder: The Eighth Day, Theophilus North, Autobiographical Writings (Library of America, 864 pages, February 2012)
- Sweet Theft: A Poet's Commonplace Book (Counterpoint, 256 pages, April 2016)
