= David Kalstone =

American writer and literary critic

David Kalstone (July 25, 1933 – June 14, 1986) was a gay American writer and literary critic.

== Biography ==
Kalstone, born in McKeesport, Pennsylvania, was the recipient of a Fulbright Scholarship and studied at the University of Cambridge. He taught at Harvard University starting in 1959 and was a professor of English at Rutgers University from 1967 until his death.

An authority on the Elizabethan courtier poet Sir Philip Sidney, Kalstone also lectured and wrote about 20th-century poets including Elizabeth Bishop and Robert Lowell. His close friends included the poet James Merrill and the writer Edmund White, who is said to have modeled on Kalstone the character of Joshua in his 1997 novel, The Farewell Symphony.

Merrill wrote the introduction to Becoming a Poet, a study of Elizabeth Bishop and the influence of Marianne Moore and Robert Lowell in helping shape the younger poet's voice. Left incomplete at Kalstone's death due to AIDS, it was published (to considerable acclaim) in 1989.

== Bibliography ==
- Sidney's Poetry: Contexts and Interpretations (1965)
- Five Temperaments: Elizabeth Bishop, Robert Lowell, James Merrill, Adrienne Rich, John Ashbery (1977)
- Becoming a Poet: Elizabeth Bishop with Marianne Moore and Robert Lowell (1989)
