= Hans Lodeizen =

Dutch poet (1924-1950)

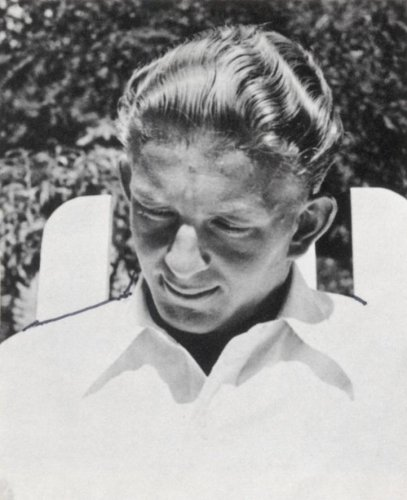
- Born: Johannes August Frederik Lodeizen; 20 July 1924; Naarden, Netherlands
- Died: 26 July 1950 (aged 26); Lausanne, Switzerland
- Occupation: poet

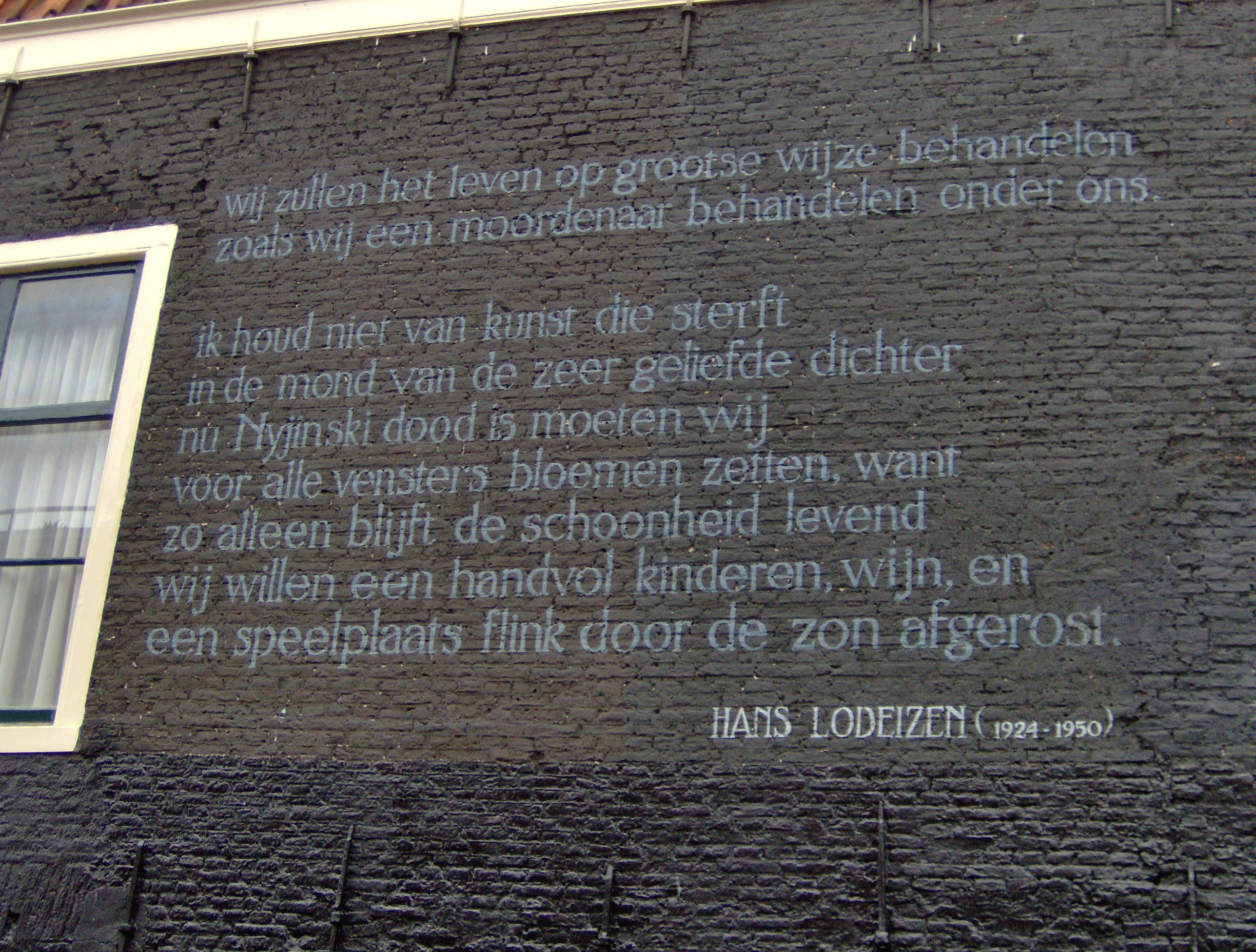
Wall poem in Leiden

Hans Lodeizen (20 July 1924 – 26 July 1950), born Johannes August Frederik Lodeizen, was a Dutch poet. He was the author of one book of poems (The Wallpaper Within, 1949) and a quantity of miscellaneous work. Despite his short life and modest output, his minimalist lyrics, which are generally constituted of short, unrhymed lines without capitals or punctuation, strongly influenced a post-war generation of Dutch poets, including Gerard Reve (who enjoyed a private correspondence with Lodeizen's father, revealed in 2002 by Lodeizen's Dutch biographer).

voor Jim

de sterren en het ongeneselijke
moment van de twee balken.
Orion ontdekt en in zijn hand
o noodlot in zijn hand het zwaard.

the stars & the incurable
moment of two crossed beams.
Orion discovered & in his hand
o fate in his hand the sword.

— "for Jim", translated by James Merrill

== Early life and education ==
Born into an influential family, Lodeizen was raised in great privilege as the son of the director of Müller & Company, an international trading firm. He attended Het Haagsche Lyceum, and when he failed the fifth form he ran away. He was gone for two days, stayed in Amsterdam and Ede, and wrote sonnets. He graduated in 1943 and went in hiding to escape the Arbeitseinsatz.

Starting in 1946, Lodeizen studied law briefly in Leiden, but took an interest in biology and pursued graduate study at Amherst College in the United States in 1947-1948. There he befriended the poet James Merrill who, after becoming "smitten" with Lodeizen, would describe him many years later as "clever, goodnatured, solitary, blond, / all to a disquieting degree". Lodeizen lost interest in his graduate biology program and returned to Europe to work (reluctantly) for his father's firm. Lodeizen was either gay or bisexual; as a young man he had proposed marriage to a woman, but his poetry speaks of his love and desire for other men. In 1948 he was arrested for having had sex with another man, but his father's money and influence likely prevented a trial. His father disapproved of his life in many ways—Lodeizen wanted to write poetry, not study law, and he did not want to enter the family business, but at the same time he desperately wanted his father's approval while his father refused to accept his sexuality. This tension is, besides lost romantic love and the ephemeral nature of the world, the most important theme in his poetry. Lodeizen's "ben ik nu werkelijk zo slecht" (am I really this bad) cites the disapproving words of his father: "wat jij me al niet in mijn leven / hebt aangedaan kan ik niet vergeten", all the things you've done to me in my life, I cannot forget them. After his death, when his remaining poetry was to be published, his father wanted thirteen of his son's poems scrapped, though the editors did include them.

After his diagnosis with leukemia, he spent his last months sustained by blood transfusions in a Swiss sanatorium. He was 26 when he died.

== Publications ==
In 1951 Lodeizen was awarded the Jan Campert Prize, posthumously. A selection of his poems was added to Het innerlijk behang and published in 1952, edited by J. C. Bloem, Jan Greshoff, and Adriaan Morriën, as Gedichten. Another selection, edited by Pierre H. Dubois and P. Berger and published in 1969 as Nagelaten werk, also included prose. These posthumous publications show more clearly to which extent Lodeizen's homosexuality colored his poetry. A collected works, Verzamelde gedichten van Lodeizen, was published in 1996, edited by W.J. van den Akker et al., with introduction, notes, and index.

Lodeizen's poems have been translated into English by James Brockway and James Merrill, among others.

== Works ==
- Het innerlijk behang (The inner wallpaper, 1949, published in March 1950), published by G.A. van Oorschot, Amsterdam; 74 pp.
- Het innerlijk behang en andere gedichten (The inner wallpaper and other poems, L. A. Ries, editor, 1952); 185 pp., 15th edition 1989
- Verzamelde Gedichten (Collected Poems, 1952), G.A. van Oorschot, edited by J.C. Bloem, Jan Greshoff and Adriaan Morriën
- Nagelaten werk (Unfinished Work, 1969); 6th edition 1988
- Verzamelde Gedichten (Collected Poems, 1996), published by G.A. van Oorschot, Amsterdam; 682 pp., second edition 2007

== Translation ==
- A Ship of Leaves, Twelve Poems by Hans Lodeizen, selected and translated by Geert Lernout. Toronto: Aliquando Press, 1982.
