= David Noyes Jackson =

American artist (1922–2001)

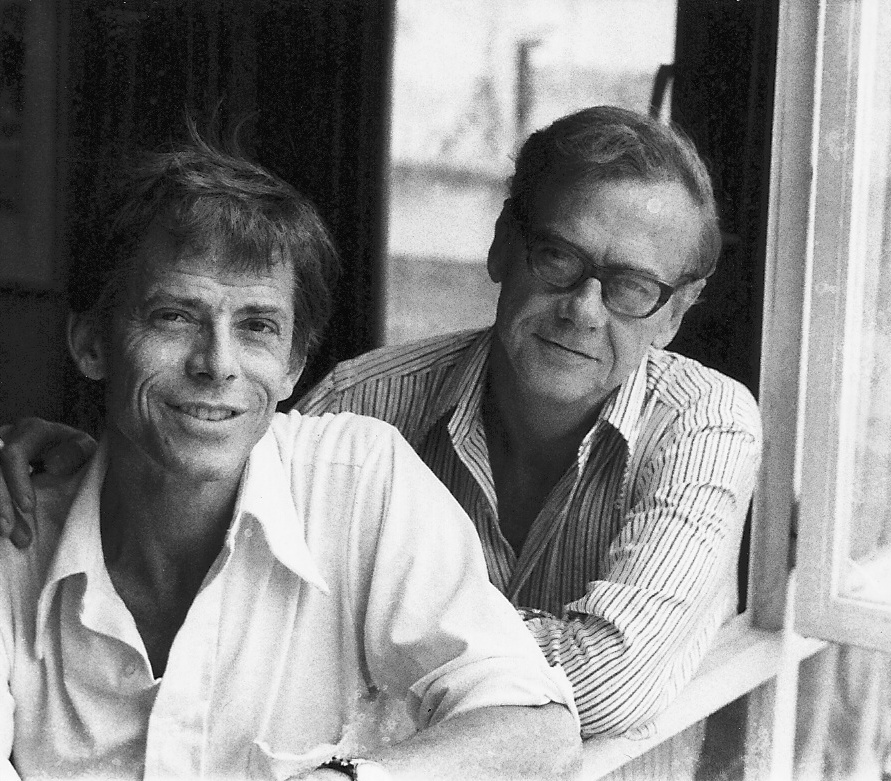
- James Merrill and Jackson in Athens, Greece, 1973
- Born: September 16, 1922
- Died: July 13, 2001 (aged 78)
- Occupations: Writer, artist
- Partner: James Merrill
- Writing career
- Notable works: 'The Changing Light at Sandover, (collaborator and 'medium')

David Noyes Jackson (September 16, 1922 – July 13, 2001) was the life partner of poet James Merrill (1926–1995).

== Life ==
A writer and artist, Jackson is remembered today primarily for his literary collaboration with Merrill. The two men met in May 1953 in New York City, after a performance of Merrill's play, "The Bait." They shared homes in Stonington, Connecticut, Key West, Florida, and Athens, Greece. "It was, I often thought, the happiest marriage I knew," wrote Alison Lurie, who got to know both men in the 1950s and thought enough of the relationship to write a memoir about it more than forty years later, Familiar Spirits (2001).

Over the course of decades conducting séances with a Ouija board, Merrill and Jackson took down supernatural transcriptions and messages from otherworldly entities. Merrill's and Jackson's ouija transcriptions were first published in verse form in The Book of Ephraim (printed for the first time in Divine Comedies, 1976, which was awarded the Pulitzer Prize in 1977).

Jackson collaborated with James Merrill on much of his most significant poetic output. The Book of Ephraim (1976), Mirabell: Books of Number (1978), and Scripts for the Pageant (1980) were all written with Jackson's assistance. Together, they constitute the epic trilogy The Changing Light at Sandover, a 560-page apocalyptic poem published in its entirety in 1982.

He and James Merrill are buried side by side at Evergreen Cemetery, Stonington. Jackson's former wife and Merrill's friend, Doris Sewell Jackson is buried behind them.

== Gallery ==
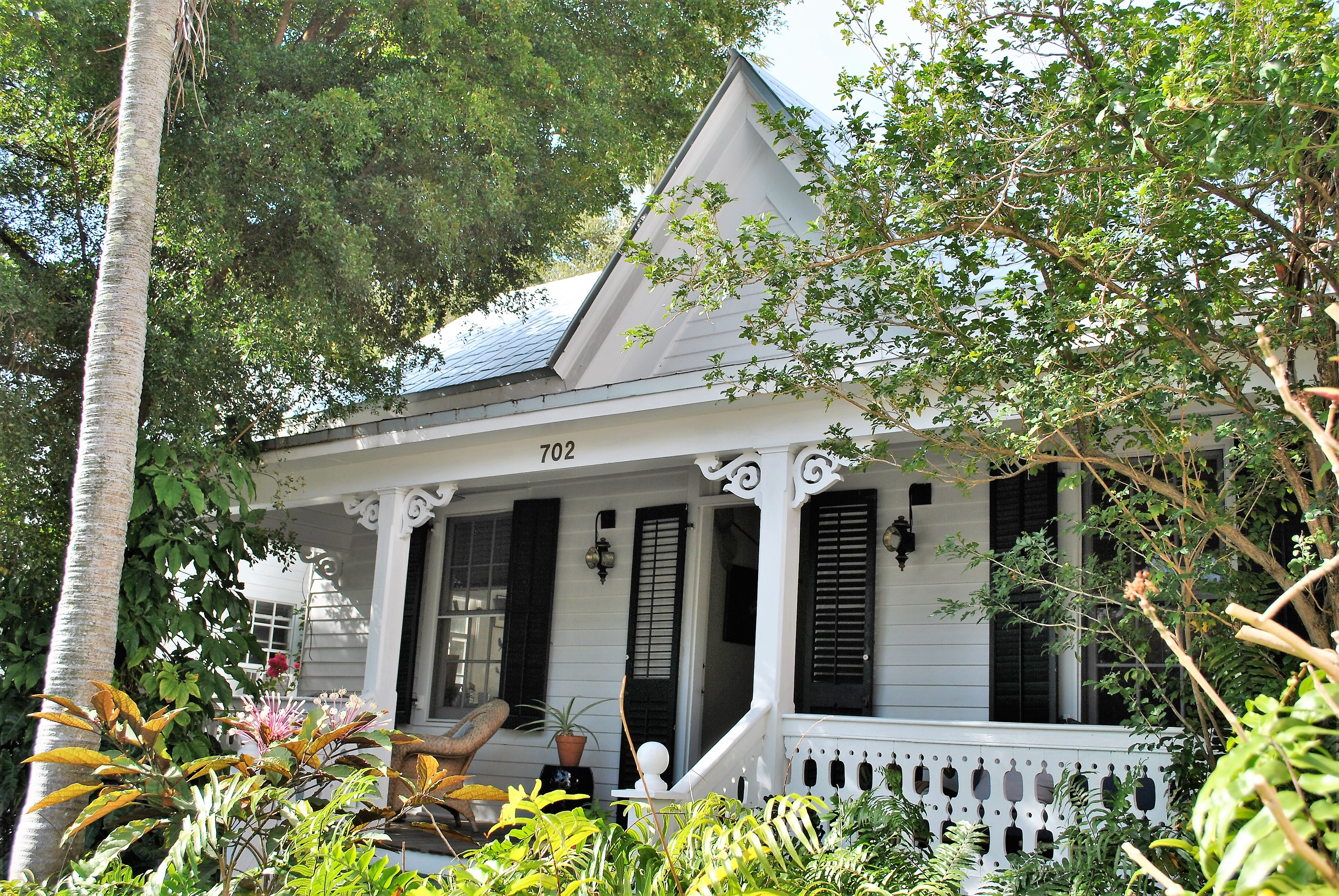
James Merrill and David Jackson House, Key West, Florida

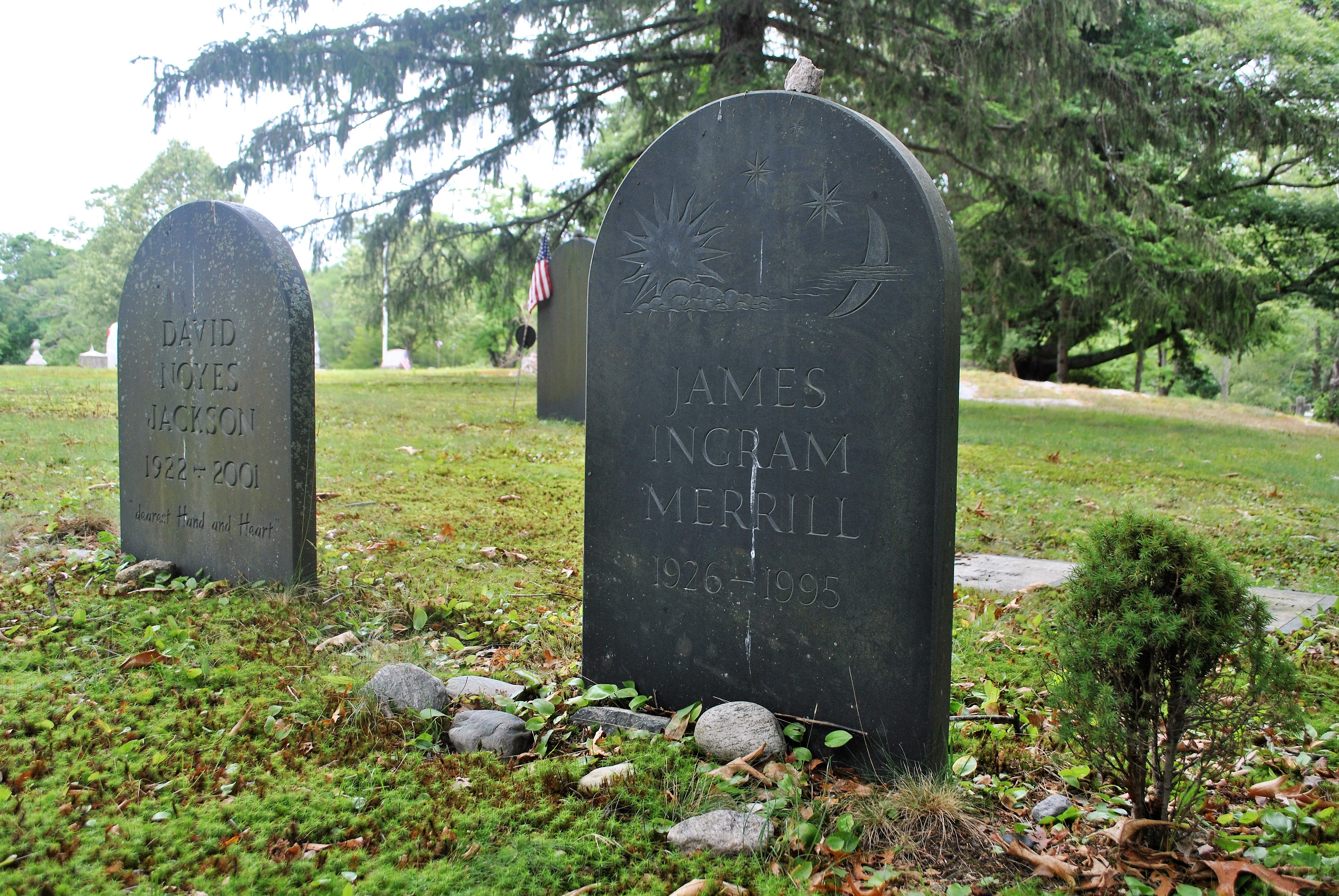
Jackson and Merrill graves, Evergreen Cemetery, Stonington, Connecticut
