= Stephen Yenser =

American poet and literary critic (born 1941)

- Born: 1941 (age 84–85); Wichita, Kansas, United States
- Education: University of Wisconsin
- Occupations: Poet, literary critic, professor
- Employer: University of California, Los Angeles
- Spouse: Melissa Berton
- Children: Helen
- Awards: Walt Whitman Award, Pushcart Prize, Ingram Merrill Foundation Award, others

Stephen Yenser (born 1941, Wichita, Kansas, United States) is an American poet and literary critic who has published three acclaimed volumes of verse, as well as books on James Merrill, Robert Lowell, and an assortment of contemporary poets. With J.D. McClatchy, he is co-literary executor of the James Merrill estate and co-editor of six volumes of Merrill's work.

== Life ==
Yenser graduated from the University of Wisconsin, studying with James Merrill in 1967 on one of the rare occasions when the poet taught. Merrill dedicated to Yenser his final, posthumous collection, A Scattering of Salts (1995).

Yenser is Professor of English Emeritus and founding Director of Creative Writing at the University of California, Los Angeles, curating the Hammer Poetry Series at the Hammer Museum.

His work has appeared in Paris Review, Poetry, Southwest Review, Yale Review, "The New Yorker," and many other magazines. He lives in Los Angeles with his wife Melissa Berton and daughter Helen.

== Awards ==
- Appearances in BEST AMERICAN POETRY anthologies 1992, 1995, 2011
- 1992 Walt Whitman Award. selected by Richard Howard
- "Discovery"/The Nation Award
- Fulbright Teaching Fellowships to Greece and France
- Ingram Merrill Foundation Award in Poetry
- Pushcart Prize
- B. F. Connors Prize for Poetry from the Paris Review.
- Harvey L. Eby Teaching Award at UCLA

== Works ==
=== Poetry ===
- Stone Fruit(Waywiser Press, 2016), poetry 93 pages, ISBN 978-1-904130-81-9
- Blue Guide (University of Chicago Press, 2006), poetry, 96 pages, ISBN 978-0226951355
- The Fire in All Things (LSU Press, 1993), poetry, 64 pages, ISBN 978-0807118283

=== Essays ===
- A Boundless Field: American Poetry at Large (University of Michigan Press, 2002), Poets on Poetry Series, 256 pages, ISBN 978-0472112784
- The Consuming Myth: The Work of James Merrill (Harvard University Press, 1987), 384 pages, ISBN 978-0674166158
- Circle to Circle: The Poetry of Robert Lowell (University of California Press,1976), 370 pages, ISBN 978-0520027909

=== Editor ===
- James Merrill (2021). Langdon Hammer and Stephen Yenser (ed.). A Whole World: Letters From James Merrill. Knopf. ISBN 978-1101875506.
- James Merrill (2011). J. D. McClatchy and Stephen Yenser (ed.). The Changing Light at Sandover. Knopf. ISBN 978-0375711749.
- James Merrill (2008). J. D. McClatchy and Stephen Yenser (ed.). Selected Poems. Random House. ISBN 978-0-375-71166-4.
- James Merrill (2004). J. D. McClatchy and Stephen Yenser (ed.). Collected Prose. Knopf. ISBN 978-0375411366.
- James Merrill (2003). J. D. McClatchy and Stephen Yenser (ed.). Collected Novels and Plays. Knopf. ISBN 978-0-375-71083-4.
- James Merrill (2002). J. D. McClatchy and Stephen Yenser (ed.). Collected Poems. Knopf. ISBN 978-0375411397.

=== Other ===
- "Variations (for Three Old Saws)". Slate. May 1, 2012.
- Paul N. Courant; Ann Kjellberg; J. D. McClatchy; Edward Mendelson; Margo Viscusi; Tappan Wilder; Stephen Yenser (March 26, 2009). "Google & Books: An Exchange". The New York Review of Books. 56 (5).
- "Musing". Best American Poetry. February 10, 2009.
