= Van Doren =

Van Doren is a toponymic surname of Dutch origin and a variation of Van Doorn. Notable people with the surname include:

- Carl Clinton Van Doren (1885–1950), Pulitzer Prize-winning biographer, brother of Mark Van Doren
- Charles Van Doren (1926–2019), quiz show contestant, professor and Encyclopædia Britannica editor, son of Mark Van Doren
- Dorothy Van Doren (1896–1993), American novelist, wife of Mark Van Doren
- Howard Van Doren Shaw (1869–1926), American architect
- Irita Bradford Van Doren (1891–1966), American literary figure and editor of the New York Herald Tribune, wife of Carl Clinton Van Doren
- Philip Van Doren Stern (1900–1984), American author and Civil War historian
- Mamie Van Doren (born 1931), American actress
- Mark Van Doren (1894–1972), Pulitzer Prize-winning poet and critic, brother of Carl Clinton Van Doren
- Paul Van Doren (1930–2021), American businessman
- Sally Van Doren (fl. from 1986), American poet

== See also ==
- Van (Dutch)
- Vandoren, the reed manufacturing company
- Van Dooren
- Van Doorn
- Van Dorn (disambiguation)
