= Van Dooren =

Van Dooren is a toponymic surname of Dutch origin and a variation of the more common Van Doorn. Notable people with the surname include:

- Bas van Dooren (born 1973), Dutch mountain biker.
- Frans van Dooren (1934–2005), Dutch poet and writer
- Gonzague Vandooren (born 1979), Belgian footballer
- Jules Vandooren (1908–1985), French footballer
- Kurt Van Dooren (born 1978), Belgian footballer
- Ralph van Dooren (born 1981), Dutch footballer

== See also ==
- Van Doorn
- Van Doorne
- Van Doren
- Van Dorn
