= Doorn (surname) =

Doorn is a surname. Notable people with the surname include:

- Bert Doorn (born 1949), Dutch politician
- Lisa Doorn (born 2000), Dutch footballer

== See also ==
- Van Doorn, another surname
