= Margaret Bradford Boni =

American educator

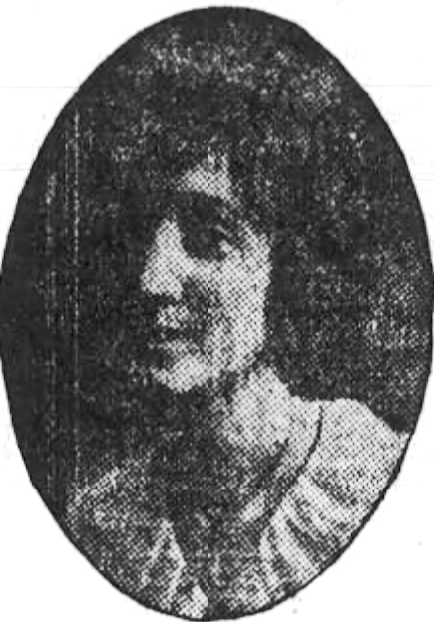
- Margaret Taylor Bradford, later Boni, from a 1917 advertisement
- Born: Margaret Taylor Bradford; November 23, 1892; Birmingham, Alabama
- Died: November 26, 1974 (age 82); New York City
- Occupation(s): Music educator, folklorist
- Relatives: Irita Bradford Van Doren (sister); Albert Boni (brother-in-law); Carl Van Doren (brother-in-law)

Margaret Taylor Bradford Boni (November 23, 1892 – November 26, 1974) was an American music educator and folklorist. She edited several books of popular music, including The Fireside Book of Folk Songs (1947). She taught music at the City and Country School from 1928 to 1954, where she worked with Pete Seeger in the 1940s.

== Early life and education ==
Bradford was born in Birmingham, Alabama, and raised in Florida, the daughter of John Taylor Bradford and Ida Henley Brooks Bradford. Her father was in the lumber industry; her older sister was editor Irita Bradford Van Doren. She graduated from Florida State College for Women in 1909, with further musical studies at the Juilliard School.

== Career ==
Bradford taught piano and harmony at the Little Rock Conservatory and College for Women in Arkansas in the 1910s. Boni was director of the music department at the City and Country School in New York City, from 1928 to 1954. One of the other music teachers during her tenure was a young Pete Seeger, who taught at the school in 1949. She promoted the use of the recorder as a teaching instrument, and taught recorder classes at New York University. Artist Julian E. Levi painted a portrait of Boni playing recorder in 1940.

== Publications ==
Songwriter Billy Joel wrote in a 2020 essay that "The most important book I ever had in my life was my mother's copy of The Fireside Book of Folk Songs by Margaret Bradford Boni." He explained that the combination of music and lyrics and images caught his imagination as a small child, before he could read or play music.

- How to Play the Recorder (1938)
- Keep Singing, Keep Humming (1946, illustrated by Lucienne Bloch)
- The Fireside Book of Folk Songs (1947, illustrated by Martin and Alice Provensen)
- The Fireside Book of Favorite American Songs (1952, illustrated by Aurelius Battaglia)
- The Fireside Book of Love Songs (1954)
- Favorite Christmas Carols (1957)
- Songs of the Gilded Age (1960)

== Personal life ==
Bradford married Greenwich Village bookseller and publisher Charles Boni Jr. in 1931. He died in 1969, and she died in 1974, at the age of 82, in New York City.
