= History of knowledge =

Within academia, the history of knowledge is the field covering the accumulated and known human knowledge constructed or discovered during human history and its historic forms, focus, accumulation, bearers, impacts, mediations, distribution, applications, societal contexts, conditions and methods of production. It is related to, yet separate from, the history of science, the history of scholarship and the history of philosophy. The scope of the history of knowledge encompass all the discovered and created fields of human-derived knowledge such as logic, philosophy, mathematics, science, sociology, psychology and data mining.

The history of knowledge is an academic discipline that studies forms of knowledge in the recorded past. The discipline emerged in the 2000s as a response to the digital age and was formally recognised with the introduction of disciplines such as Geschichte des Wissens and Wissenschaftsgeschichte in German academia. Academics within the field aim to research the forms, dissemination and production of knowledge with a focus on both "high" and "low" everyday knowledge. Research approaches are based on the theories of Michel Foucault with concepts like "orders of knowledge" and are similar to other fields with the use of social, cultural and political frameworks.

The formation of the discipline has roots in the 1950s history of science field and contemporary concepts can be identified in works that go back to the 15th century. The extent studied within the field is dynamic as seen from the research of confessional knowledge to the digital revolution. Concepts applied in this specialty such as "scientification" explain the transformation of information to knowledge. "Scientification" is related to the description of "raw" information given by Peter Burke. Peter Burke is listed among some of the canon authors in the field alongside Martin Mulsow, Pierre Bourdieu and Michel Foucault.

== The history of the field ==
Foundations of the history of knowledge have been traced by academics such as historian Peter Burke in works including "What is the History of Knowledge?". The book identifies the 15th century "Advancement of Learning" in which Francis Bacon writes on the circulation of knowledge. The concept of "circulation" has been used in the field of history since the 2000s and outlines the transfer of knowledge through actors or spaces. In the 19th century, academics expressed a want to historicise knowledge and look at the developments of knowledge. This is similar to the emergence of the history of natural sciences in the 19th century. The scientific philosopher Auguste Comte was one of the first to try to implement it in the university system. The philosopher illustrates the growing academic interest towards historicising knowledge. Following Comte, the 1960s second movement of the sociology of knowledge introduced ideas from Michel Foucault and Pierre Bourdieu. Both authorities analogously impacted the history of knowledge evidenced by Foucault's work on knowledge production sites and Bourdieu's work on situated knowledge in Homo Academicus.

The inception of the history of knowledge follows the history of science developments as an academic discipline. George Sarton, in the early years of the 20th century, advocated for a new practice to study the progress on the scientific and foresaw humanities use to science. By the 1950s and 60s, the history of science had implemented itself as an academic discipline in universities across America and Europe. The shift from the history of science to the German Wissenschaftsgeschichte (history of academic knowledge) involved the inclusion of the humanities and social sciences. The 2000s began the movement towards the German Wissensgeschichte, meaning the history of knowledge. Following the establishment of the history of knowledge, arguments occurred over whether the history of science should be absorbed by the history of knowledge.

The history of knowledge's relevancy has coincided with the discussion of the academic term "knowledge society" as reflected in the need for knowledge management since the 1960s. It has also coincided with the study of the digital revolution which is seen as part of a series of knowledge revolutions. The age of the digital revolution has produced questions at how past knowledge has been circulated and generated. Peter Burke documents that the scholarship being increasingly globalized influenced the growth of the discipline, seen in the independent research in the 1990s with books like "Fields of Knowledge" (1992) and "Colonialism and its Forms of Knowledge" (1996). Thereafter the history of knowledge discipline became institutionalized in the 2000s throughout Germany (Erfurt and Kiel).

== Scope ==
The history of knowledge is known for its amplitude of areas to study. Despite this academics are not in consensus on what research the discipline does include. Areas that have been researched include knowledge in non-western contexts, elite knowledge, knowledge in everyday practices, implicit knowledge and religious, social, political or cultural knowledge. Topics can range from medical recipes written by women, 18th century crop failures to the history of American "wisdom" such as pop psychology.

Knowledge is a formative concept to the field, however, its definition from Wissensgechichte academics is, as Suzanne Marchand writes, "inconsistent". Scholars concede a general idea that knowledge is defined as to what has been accepted in the past as knowledge. In opposition Lorraine Daston views this definition as detrimental to the field, writing it as too expansive and argues for the definition of "systemised knowing". Daston also states in the "History of Science and the History of Knowledge" that there is no single definition of knowledge.

The definitions of knowledge that are used diverge and interdisciplinary measures from areas like epistemology are used in order to provide a clearer notion. This has been contended, as epistemological definitions ignore knowledge that can be applied. Knowledge is variable and what is defined as worth knowing, accepted as knowledge or evidence is dependent on "place, time and social group". Moreover knowledge is conceptualized differently in languages (Latin; scientia "knowing that" compared to ars "knowing how"), complicating scholars' work to define knowledge or the discipline. This is because the understanding of knowledge is affected by language. Relative to the topic, it has been pointed out that knowledge as a concept risks becoming progressively vague and unable for the use of analysis.

The discipline and transdisciplinary movement overlaps with numerous academic fields. The Geschichte des Wissens incorporates researchers from various areas including philosophy, literary history and predominantly social history among others. In geography, an overlap with the history of knowledge can be seen with its recent epistemological shift and its studies on knowledge production sites i.e. the study of scientific knowledge and its geographical environments. Lorraine Daston's definition includes religious knowledge, for confessional knowledge is systemised.

In the history of knowledge, the idea that knowledge and history should be plural is based on Michel Foucault's pluralisation of savoir 'to know'. It is also founded in the anthropology field which pluralises culture in the concept "cultures of knowledge". This is to do with the many forms of knowledge such as the abstract or concrete. This contrasts with the 19th century belief that history is a singular narrative. This view is known as the Die Geschichte and was deconstructed in the 20th century. In addition, one scholar asks if the history of knowledge can remove the need for concepts such as "social" and "cultural history". The same scholar goes on to describe the way Peter Burke uses knowledge as a replacement for culture.

== Concepts ==
Theories, approaches and concepts have been used to study the history of knowledge and allow researchers to uncover small-scale understandings that are then connected to a wider context. For example, concepts that are "political", "social" and "cultural" which are relevant to the field. In the employment of relevant measures, historians approach the field internally by evaluating the content in adverse to contextual approaches which focus on concepts.

Scientification is a concept used in the field and means the transformation of information to knowledge where it is systemised. It constitutes practices that are conventional such as observation which is then disciplined. The conception follows closely to Peter Burke's definition of knowledge as a "cooked" form that is transformed from "raw" information. Similarly the methods of objectivity, demonstration, error and belief are derived from traditional scientific methodologies and applied in the research of history. Reasoned however is the use of science that was defined in the 19th century. It creates an anachronism when the concept is applied on knowledge practises prior to the century.

Graph of knowledge. Smithsonian American Art Museum.

Michel Foucault's "orders of knowledge" is a concept which defines orders as determined by time or place. When a culture's values intersect with its knowledge practises, it forms a regime. The system, seen as centres of knowledge such as a university, is shaped by interactions along with values. This is the basis of Foucault's theory that a "regime of truth" is inherent within society. Historians look at a time frame in history and ask how people interpreted their contextual world by looking at what knowledge influenced the individual interpretations, and then investigating how their understandings affected the orders of knowledge. Some practitioners of the field are seen working at the Geschichte Des Wissens through the University of Zurich. Publications from the institution's co-founders like Philip Sarasin mirror the work of Michel Foucault.

The studying of knowledge is not just applied to the understanding of knowledge but also the practical, social and everyday knowledge practices. These areas are studied in order to examine the social and political structures whilst also extending the research past these dominant pure aspects. Part of the objective is to study dismissed everyday knowledge, for example the artisanal. The research not only deviates from the disciplines focal point on the scientific and intellectual forms of knowledge, it also acknowledges the social, political and economic realms wherein knowledge is exerted. Additionally, the social and the cultural are two approaches which study the circumstances and institutions of knowledge. Both concepts employ a focus on external influences instead of knowledge by itself. The social and cultural aspects are related to the social method Wissensoziologie 'sociology of knowledge' formed by Karl Mannheim in 1920s Germany. Mannheim also developed the concept "Sein-sgebundenheit" that argues knowledge is linked with the concept "social". It states that individual beliefs and thoughts are determined by their social class.

== Advantages and limitations ==
The history of knowledge has long been criticized for being “eccentric” yet it has steadfastly grown since its conception as a historical profession. Scholars have contributed to the growth of knowledge within the field whilst also demonstrating its values and weaknesses as a branch of study.

The history of knowledge's subject matter is undefined and critics contend the field's vague scope. One reason for this is the specializations of academics working within this discipline are broad. In contrast, drawing knowledge from other disciplines is considered advantageous to the field as it encourages cooperation between scholars. Simone Lassig also declares that the profession's expansive view is better equipped to study forgotten knowledge in the past whilst also reminding historians of the open-endedness of history.

Fields such as the history of science risk being subsumed by the history of knowledge. History of science has amassed criticisms in academic circles with claims of eurocentrism because it stands on the idea that Europe is the foundation of science. The debates towards opting history of knowledge argue it's because of the field's lack of reliance on the “Western” concept. Contestably, the history of knowledge is branded as a ‘simple reconceptualization’ of the history of science and intellectual history disciplines. This is because it has been noted to resemble what the history of science and intellectual history disciplines have already accomplished. For example, some topics that have been studied under the history of science are now being researched within the history of knowledge.

Another deemed limitation in the academic sphere is the focus upon knowledge itself that leaves out the study of knowledge production through the individual and micro-worlds. For example, people with beliefs interpret their believed notions as knowledge. Evidentially, those who contributed to innovations and the discovery of knowledge including their aims and beliefs are not investigated. It is argued that when examined it poses a risk for only interpreting past knowledge. This removes what was not known and omits the human aspect. Although the study of “low” knowledge is researched in the field, knowledge of non-elites was not recognised as knowledge in the past. Moreover, the definition that scholars propose that defines knowledge as the study of what has been accepted as knowledge is seen as limiting to this approach.

The history of knowledge looks at forms of knowledge outside of the Western context. However the Foucault concept ‘orders of knowledge’, a central basis in the history of knowledge, has been disputed as homogeneous by academic Peter Burke. He states the theory does not recognise how knowledge and information circulate outside geographical boundaries. Philipp Sarasin, in opposition, notes that the theory used in the history of knowledge encourages a post-colonial outlook.

== See also ==
- A History of Knowledge
- Recorded history
- Knowledge transfer
- Knowledge management
- Knowledge Revolution
