= Mark Van Doren =

American poet (1894–1972)

- Born: June 13, 1894; Hope, Illinois, U.S.
- Died: December 10, 1972 (aged 78); Torrington, Connecticut, U.S.
- Education: University of Illinois, Urbana-Champaign (BA); Columbia University (MA, PhD)
- Spouse: Dorothy Van Doren
- Children: 2, including Charles
- Relatives: Carl Van Doren (brother)
- Writing career
- Notable awards: Pulitzer Prize for Poetry (1940); Academy of American Poets' Fellowship (1967)

Mark Van Doren (June 13, 1894 – December 10, 1972) was an American poet, writer and critic. He was a scholar and a professor of English at Columbia University for nearly 40 years, where he inspired a generation of influential writers and thinkers including Thomas Merton, Robert Lax, John Berryman, Whittaker Chambers, and Beat Generation writers such as Allen Ginsberg and Jack Kerouac. He was literary editor of The Nation, in New York City from 1924 to 1928 and its film critic from 1935 to 1938.

Amongst his notable works, many published in The Kenyon Review, are a collaboration with his brother Carl Van Doren, American and British Literature since 1890 (1939); critical studies, The Poetry of John Dryden (1920), Shakespeare (1939), The Noble Voice (1945) and Nathaniel Hawthorne (1949); collections of poems including Jonathan Gentry (1931); stories; and the verse play The Last Days of Lincoln (1959). A notable student, later a colleague, was Lionel Trilling. David Lehman writes that "Though the differences between them were many – Trilling struck some as patrician in demeanor where Van Doren seemed ever the populist – the two great professors inspired a rare filial devotion in generations of Columbia students. It was inevitably either Mark Van Doren or Lionel Trilling who was the favorite professor of students with a literary vocation, and in time Columbia would name its highest teaching accolade after Van Doren and its major award for scholarship after Trilling." He won the 1940 Pulitzer Prize for Poetry for Collected Poems 1922–1938.

== Early life and education ==
Van Doren was born in Hope, Illinois, the fourth of five sons of the county's doctor, Charles Lucius Van Doren, of remote Dutch ancestry, and wife Eudora Ann Butz. He was raised on his family's farm in eastern Illinois, before his father decided to move to the neighboring town of Urbana, to be closer to good schools.

He was the younger brother of the academic and biographer Carl Van Doren, starting with whom all five brothers attended the local elementary school and high school. Mark Van Doren eventually studied at the University of Illinois in Urbana, where he earned a B.A. in 1914. In 1920, he earned a Ph.D. from what became the Columbia Graduate School of Arts and Sciences at Columbia University, while also a member of the Boar's Head Society, a student society at the university devoted to poetry.

== Career ==
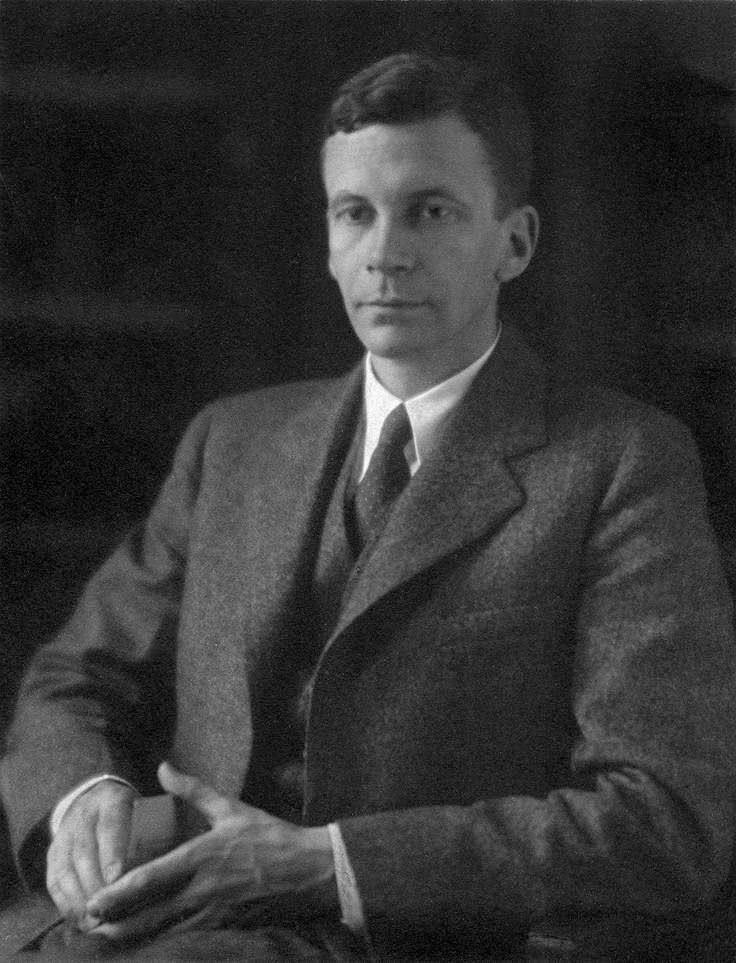
Mark Van Doren in 1920

Mark Van Doren joined the Columbia University faculty in 1920, having been preceded by his brother Carl. He went on to become one of Columbia's greatest teachers and a "legendary classroom presence"; he became a full professor in 1942, and taught English until 1959, at which point he became Professor Emeritus until his death in 1972.

David Lehman writes that "The 1920s were a great decade for Mark. At Columbia, he had remarkable students, Whittaker Chambers and Trilling among them. Van Doren published scholarly books on John Dryden and Edwin Arlington Robinson, served as literary editor of The Nation (where he met Dorothy, née Graffe, also a writer) and edited an anthology of world poetry that sold so well it enabled the Van Dorens to buy their house on Bleecker Street in the West Village in New York City in February 1929, just months before the stock market tumbled and the 'roaring' decade ran out.

At a moment when Ivy League prejudice against Jews was not uncommon, Van Doren acquired a reputation for philo-Semitism with an essay he published in 1927 in the Menorah Journal, the magazine that years later would be rechristened Commentary. In 'Jewish Students I Have Known,' Van Doren wrote perceptively and it turned out somewhat prophetically about some of the gifted young men he was teaching at Columbia. As Van Doren's student, the great art historian Meyer Schapiro already displayed the 'passion to know and make known.' Louis Zukofsky was 'a subtle poet' with 'an inarticulate soul.' Clifton Fadiman impressed with his tremendous fund of knowledge. About Trilling, who soon joined him on the Columbia faculty, Van Doren was particularly insightful. The young Trilling possessed 'dignity and grace,' Van Doren wrote, and whatever he elects to do 'will be lovely, for it will be the fruit of a pure intelligence slowly ripened in not too fierce a sun.'" From 1953 to 1971 he appeared weekly opposite Maurice Samuel on NBC radio's summer program "Eternal Light: The Words We Live By" where the two discussed the literary and cultural impact of the Bible.

Also among his students were the poets John Berryman and Robert Lax, novelist Anthony Robinson, psychologist Walter B. Pitkin Jr., Japanologist Donald Keene, writer and Trappist monk Thomas Merton and chemist Roald Hoffmann. Lehman writes that "His teaching was grounded in the proposition that an intelligent person of good faith needed no special qualifications to read Othello, The Iliad, or The Divine Comedy. You just needed to be attentive and use your intelligence. And because he treated the students with respect and without condescension, he brought out the best in them." He writes of his notable students, who "ranged from ecstatic Zen Beat masters (Allen Ginsberg, Jack Kerouac) to verse sophisticates (Louis Simpson, John Hollander, Richard Howard). It was a decisive encounter for Kerouac; he got an A in Van Doren's Shakespeare course, and decided in consequence to quit the Columbia football team and take up literature instead."

"I have always had the greatest respect for students. There is nothing I hate more than condescension—the attitude that they are inferior to you. I always assume they have good minds."

— Mark Van Doren (Newsweek, 1959)

He twice served on the staff of The Nation from 1924 to 1928 and again from 1935 to 1938. He was a member of the Society for the Prevention of World War III.

In 1940, he was awarded the Pulitzer Prize for Poetry for Collected Poems 1922–1938. This came only a year after his elder brother Carl had won the Pulitzer Prize for Biography or Autobiography for Benjamin Franklin. Van Doren helped Ginsberg avoid jail time in June 1949 by testifying on his behalf when Ginsberg was arrested as an accessory to crimes carried out by Herbert Huncke and others, and was an important influence on Merton, both in Merton's conversion to Catholicism and Merton's poetry. He was a strong advocate of liberal education, and wrote the book, Liberal Education (1943), which helped promote the influential "great books" movement. Starting in 1941, he also did Invitation to Learning, a CBS Radio show, where as one of the experts he discussed great literature.

He was made a Fellow in American Letters of the Library of Congress and also remained president of the American Academy of Arts and Letters.

== Global policy ==
He was one of the signatories of the agreement to convene a convention for drafting a world constitution. As a result, for the first time in human history, a World Constituent Assembly convened to draft and adopt the Constitution for the Federation of Earth.

== Personal life ==
In 1922 Mark Van Doren married Dorothy Graffe, novelist and writer of the memoir The Professor and I (1959), whom he had earlier met at The Nation. His successful book, Anthology of World Poetry, enabled the couple to buy a house on Bleecker Street in New York City in February 1929, before markets collapsed.

Their son, Charles Van Doren (1926–2019), briefly achieved renown as the winner of the rigged game show Twenty-One. In the film Quiz Show (1994), Mark Van Doren was played by Paul Scofield, who earned an Academy Award nomination in the Best Supporting Actor category for his performance. Their second son was John Van Doren who also lived in Cornwall, Connecticut, at the farmstead where their father did most of his writing between academic years, and where he moved after retirement.

Mark Van Doren died on December 10, 1972, in Torrington, Connecticut, aged 78, two days after undergoing surgery for circulatory problems at the Charlotte Hungerford Hospital. He was interred at Cornwall Hollow Cemetery in Connecticut.

== Legacy ==
His correspondence with Allen Tate is at Vanderbilt University. Since 1962, students of Columbia College have honored a great teacher at the school each year with the "Mark Van Doren Award". John Updike wrote that "Van Doren's Shakespeare got me through Harry Levin's course back in 1951. Whenever I reread a Shax play, I reread what Van Doren said about it."

The English Department at California Lutheran University awards the "Mark Van Doren Prize for Poetry" annually. According to the department's web page, "The Mark Van Doren Poetry Prize ($1000) was first awarded in 1972. The prize became an endowed scholarship through the donations of poet Mark Van Doren’s sons, John and Charles Van Doren."

== Bibliography ==
Poetry:

- Spring Thunder and other poems (1924)
- 7 P.M. & other poems (1926)
- Now the sky & other poems (1928)
- An Anthology of English and American Poetry (1928)
- Jonathan Gentry (1931)
- Winter Diary and other poems (1935)
- The Last Look and other poems (1937)
- Collected Poems 1922–1938 (1939), Winner of the 1940 Pulitzer Prize for Poetry
- The Mayfield Deer (1941)
- Our Lady Peace and other war poems (1942)
- The Seven Sleepers (1944)
- The Country Year (1946), William Sloane Associates, New York
- The Careless Clock (1947)
- New Poems (1948)
- Mortal Summer (1953)
- Spring Birth and other poems (1953)
- Selected poems, Holt (1954)
- The Last Days of Lincoln, a play in six scenes (1959), a Verse Play
- Morning Worship and other poems (1960)
- Collected and New Poems 1924–1963 (1963)
- Mark Van Doren: 100 poems. Hill and Wang. 1967.
- That Shining Place: New Poems (1969) Hill and Wang
- Good Morning: Last Poems (1973)

Novels:

- The Transients (1935)
- Windless Cabins (1940)
- Tilda (1943)

Short story collection

- Nobody Say a Word (1954)

Nonfiction and other:

- Henry David Thoreau: A Critical Study (1916)
- The Poetry of John Dryden (1920)
- American and British Literature Since 1890 (1925), with Carl Van Doren
- Edwin Arlington Robinson (1927)
- Introduction to Bartram's Travels (1928)
- An Autobiography of America, A. & C. Boni (1929)
- American poets, 1630–1930, Little, Brown (1932)
- The Oxford Book of American Prose, OUP (1932)
- Shakespeare (1939)
- The Liberal Education (1943)
- The night of the summer solstice: & other stories of the Russian war, Henry Holt and Company (1943)
- The Noble Voice (1946)
- Nathaniel Hawthorne (1949)
- Introduction to Poetry (1951)
- The Witch of Ramoth (short story in The Magazine of Fantasy and Science Fiction, April 1958 issue)
- The Autobiography Of Mark Van Doren (1958)
- The Happy Critic (1961)
- Mark Van Doren on Great Poems of Western Literature. Collier Books. 1962.
- Insights into literature. Houghton Mifflin. 1968.
- George Hendrick, ed. (1987). The Selected Letters of Mark Van Doren. Baton Rouge: Louisiana State University Press. ISBN 0-8071-1317-4.

Discography:

- Mark Van Doren Reads from His Collected and New Poems (Folkways Records, 1967)

== Citations ==
- "La littérature du monde a exercé son pouvoir en étant traduite."*

"L'art d'enseigner est l'art d'assister à la découverte."
