= Scholarly method =

Body of principles and practices used by scholars and academics to make their claims

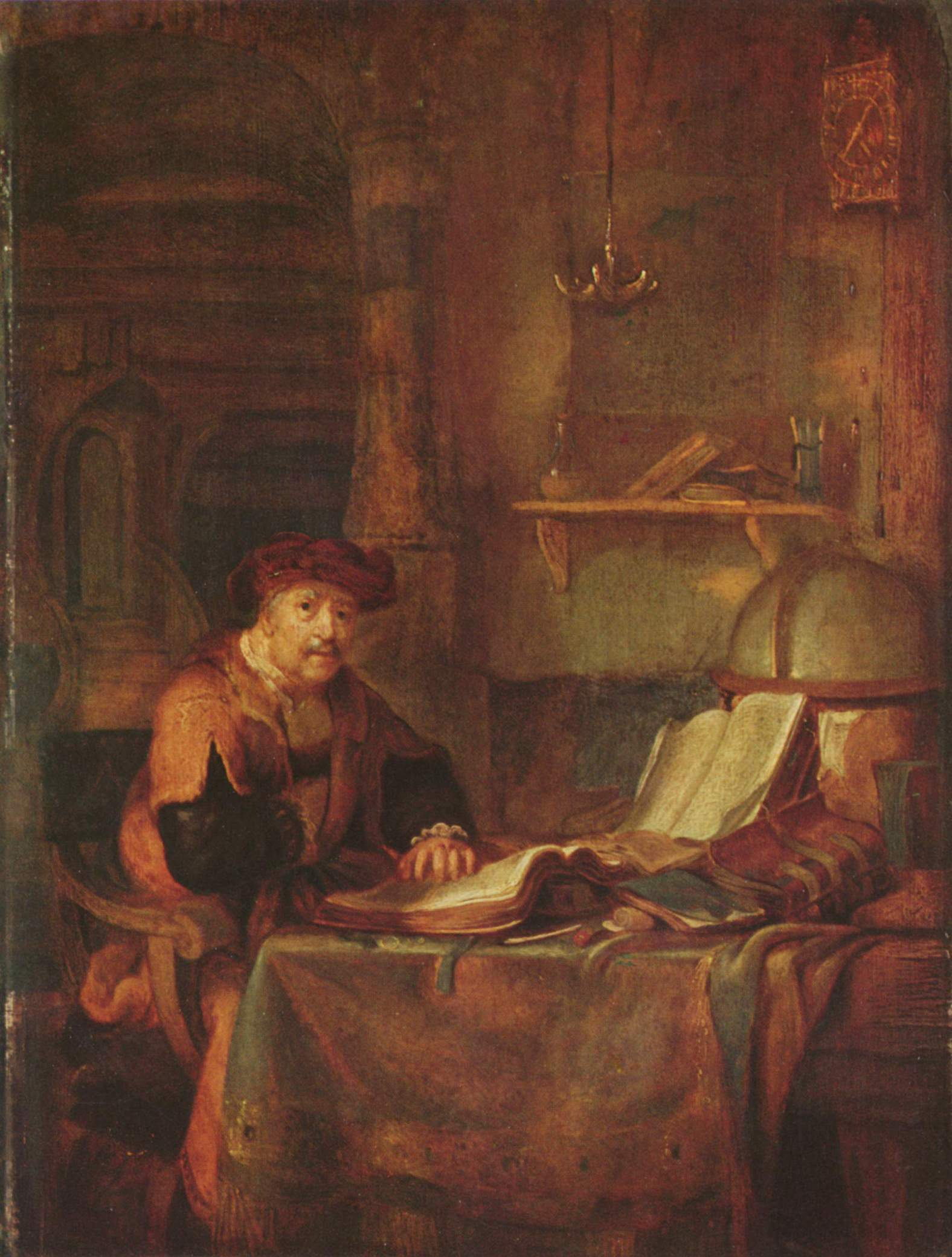
Scholar and His Books by Gerbrand van den Eeckhout

The scholarly method or scholarship is the body of principles and practices used by scholars and academics to make their claims about their subjects of expertise. These principles and practices aim to ensure the validity and trustworthiness of the claims, and to disseminate them to the scholarly community. It comprises the methods that systematically advance the teaching, research, and practice of a scholarly or academic field of study through rigorous inquiry. Scholarship is creative, can be documented, replicated, elaborated, and peer reviewed through various methods. The scholarly method includes the subcategories of the scientific method, with which scientists use to bolster their claims, and the historical method, which historians use to verify their claims.

== Methods ==
The historical method comprises the techniques and guidelines by which historians research primary sources and other evidence, and then write history. The question of the nature, and indeed the possibility, of sound historical method is raised in the philosophy of history, as a question of epistemology. History guidelines commonly used by historians in their work require external criticism, internal criticism, and synthesis.

The empirical method is generally taken to mean the collection of data on which to base a hypothesis or derive a conclusion in science. It is part of the scientific method, but is often mistakenly assumed to be synonymous with other methods. The empirical method is not sharply defined and is often contrasted with the precision of experiments, where data emerges from the systematic manipulation of variables. The experimental method investigates causal relationships among variables. An experiment is a cornerstone of the empirical approach to acquiring data about the world and is used in both natural sciences and social sciences. An experiment can be used to help solve practical problems and to support or negate theoretical assumptions.

The scientific method refers to a body of techniques for investigating phenomena, acquiring new knowledge, or correcting and integrating previous knowledge. To be termed scientific, a method of inquiry must be based on gathering observable, empirical and measurable evidence subject to specific principles of reasoning. A scientific method consists of the collection of data through observation and experimentation, and the formulation and testing of hypotheses.

== See also ==
- Academic authorship
- Academic discipline
- Academic publishing
- Doctor (title)
- Ethics
- Historical revisionism
- History of scholarship
- Manual of style
- Professor
- Source criticism
- Urtext edition
- Wissenschaft
