= 1940 Pulitzer Prize =

Awards for journalism and related fields

The following are the Pulitzer Prizes for 1940.

== Journalism awards ==
- Public Service:
  - Waterbury Republican-American for its campaign exposing municipal graft.
  - Honorable mention to the San Francisco Chronicle for "its part in settling the water front and warehouse strike in San Francisco, June 22 to Dec. 1, 1939".
- Reporting:
  - S. Burton Heath of the New York World-Telegram for his expose of the frauds perpetrated by Federal judge Martin T. Manton, who resigned and was tried and imprisoned.
- Correspondence:
  - Otto D. Tolischus of The New York Times for his dispatches from Berlin.
  - Honorable mention to Lloyd Lehrbas of the Associated Press for his dispatches from Warsaw, Bucharest, and Ankara.
- Editorial Writing:
  - Bart Howard of the St. Louis Post-Dispatch for his distinguished editorial writing during the year.

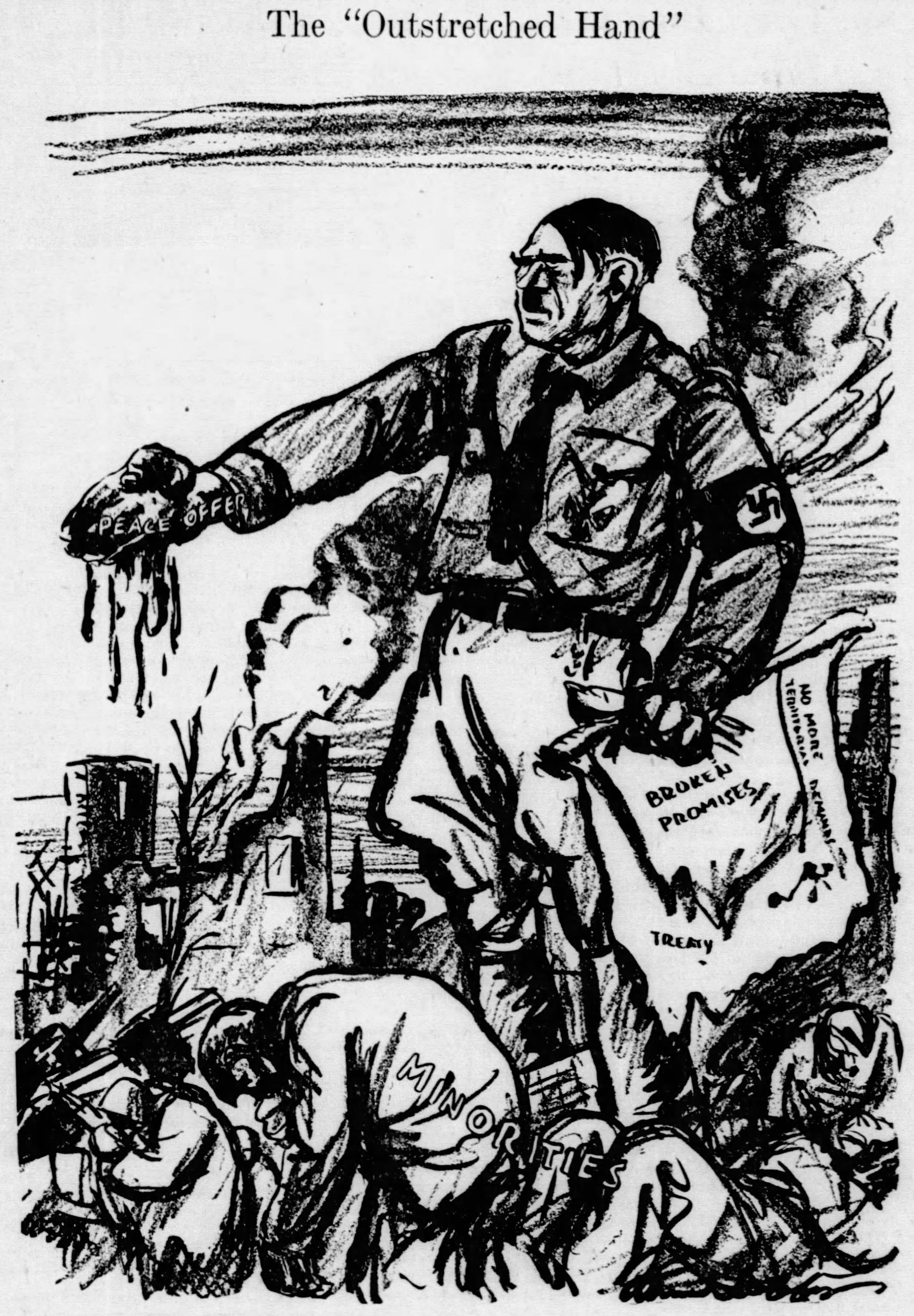
"The 'Outstretched Hand'", the prize-winning editorial cartoon

- Editorial Cartooning:
  - Edmund Duffy of The Baltimore Sun for "The 'Outstretched Hand'".

== Letters and Novel Awards ==
- Novel:
  - The Grapes of Wrath by John Steinbeck (Viking).
- Drama:
  - The Time of Your Life by William Saroyan (Harcourt).
- History:
  - Abraham Lincoln: The War Years by Carl Sandburg (Harcourt).
- Biography or Autobiography:
  - Woodrow Wilson, Life and Letters. Vols. VII and VIII by Ray Stannard Baker (Doubleday).
- Poetry:
  - Collected Poems by Mark Van Doren (Holt).
