= History of scholarship =

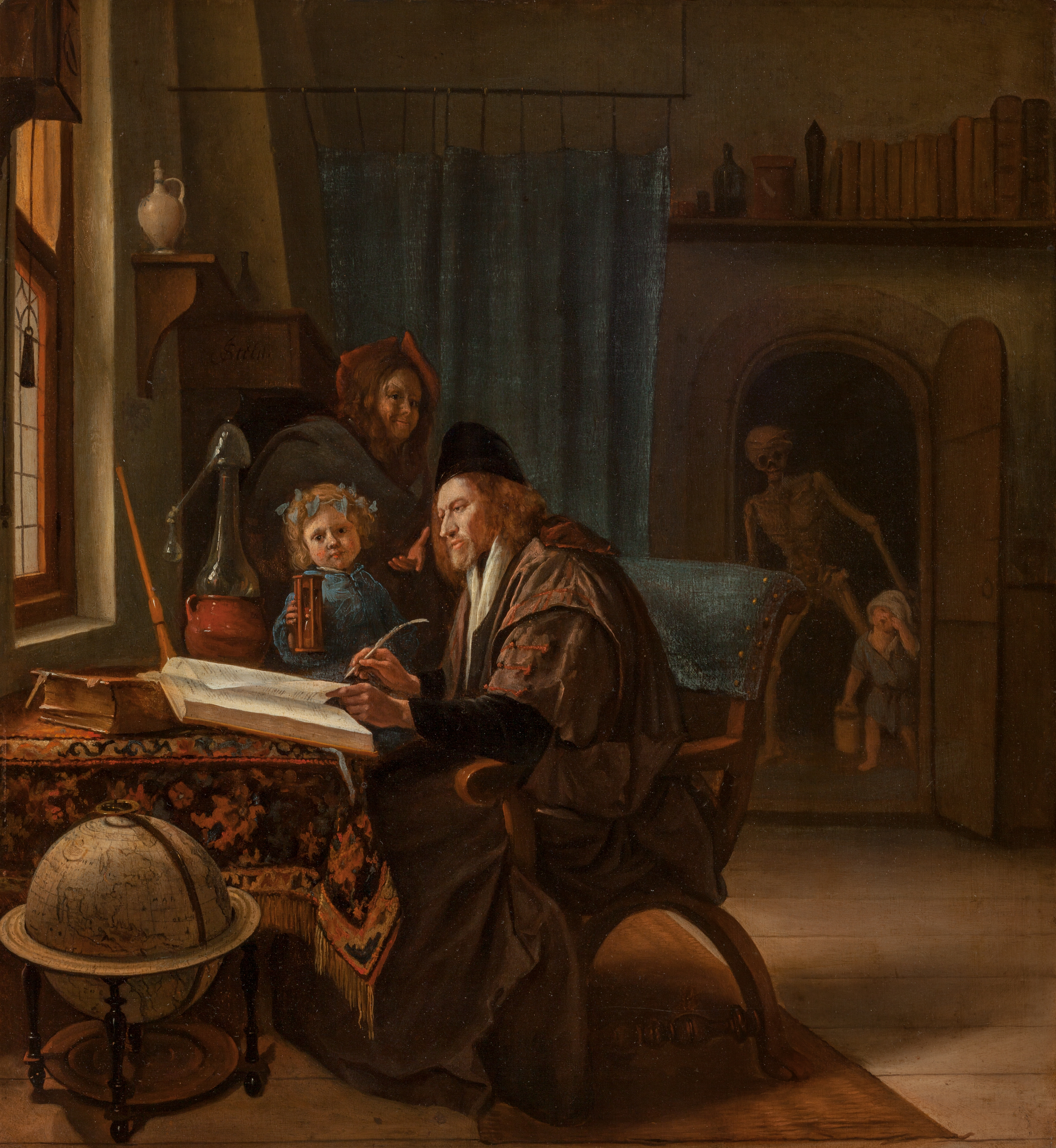
"A Scholar at his Desk"; Jan Steen, c. 1668-1669

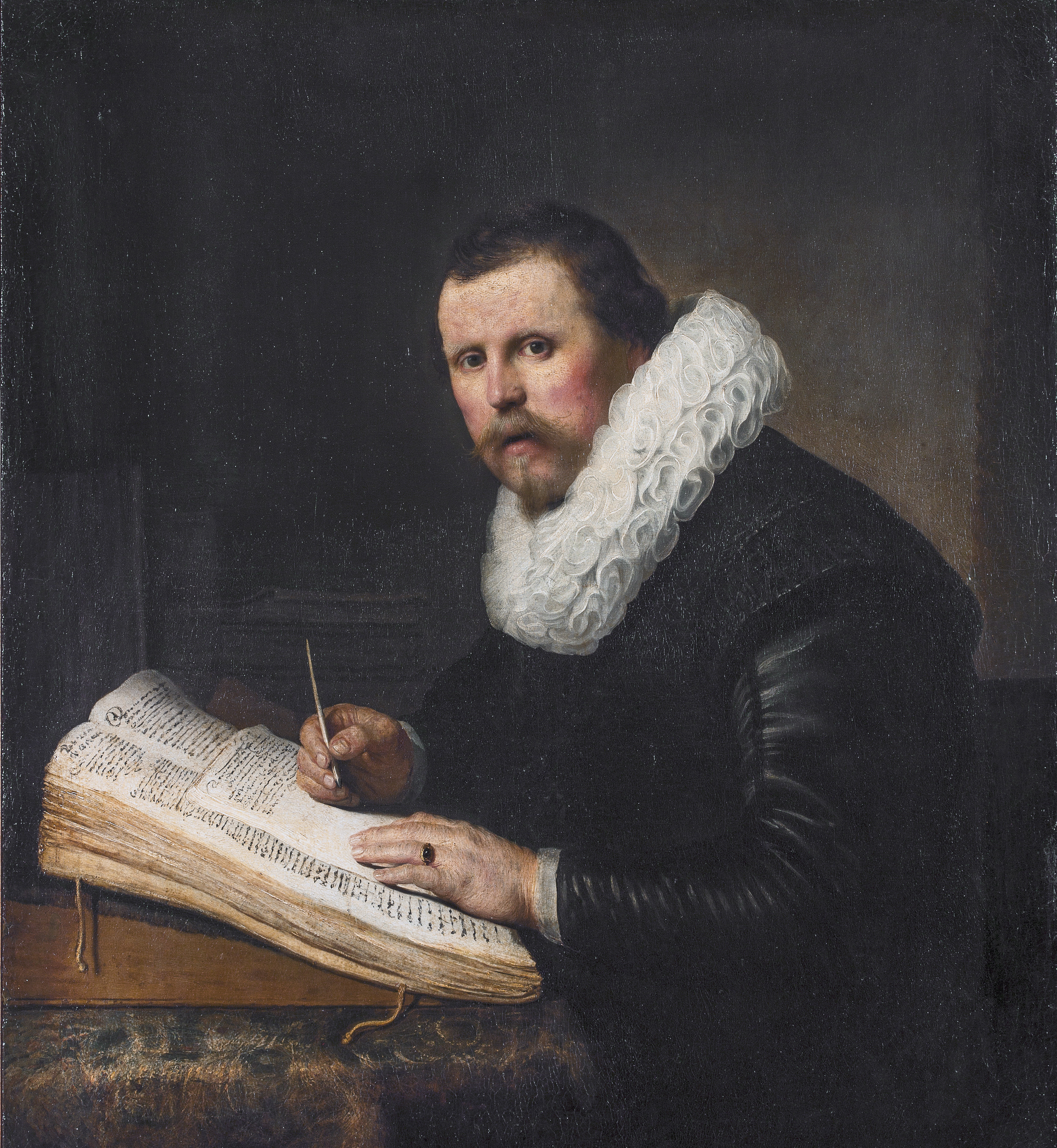
A Scholar at his Desk; Rembrandt; 1631

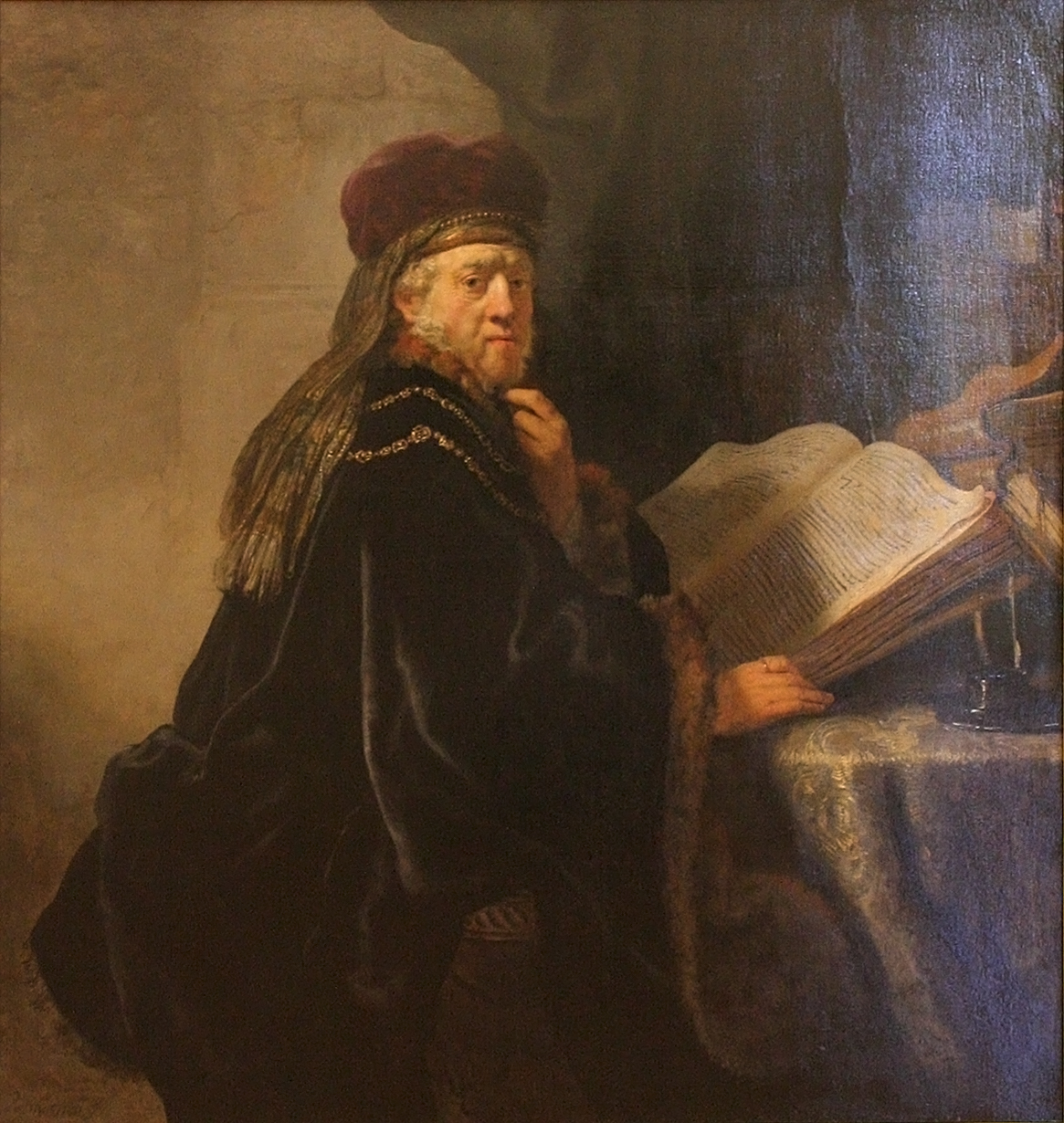
"A Scholar Seated at a Desk"; Rembrandt

The history of scholarship is the historical study of fields of study which are not covered by the English term "science" (cf., history of science), but are covered by, for example, the German term "Wissenschaft" (i.e., all kinds of academic studies). Examples include the history of classical studies, philosophy, religion, biblical studies, historiography, music, art, and literature.

It is a field which has recently undergone a complete renewal and is now a major branch of research. In 2015, the Society for the History of the Humanities was established, coinciding with the launch of the journal History of Humanities in 2016. Both developments reflect the field’s growing institutional presence and international scholarly collaboration.

== Classical scholarship ==
Rudolph Pfeiffer (1968) describes the history of classical scholarship from its revival inspired by Petrarch to the achievements of the Italian humanists and the independent movement in Holland (including Erasmus) and the German scholar-reformers. Pfeiffer traces the development of classical scholarship in the countries of Western Europe through the next two centuries, with particular attention to sixteenth-century France and eighteenth-century England. Finally he provides an account of the new approach made by Winckelmann and his successors in Germany.

== Philosophers, scholars, polymaths, and scientists ==
The word scientist was coined by the English philosopher and historian of science William Whewell in 1833. Until then there was no differentiation between the history of science, the history of philosophy, and the history of scholarship.

Before 1700 the fields of scholarship were not of a size that made academic specialisation necessary. Academic disciplines as we know them today did not exist. Scholars were generally active in both the sciences and what are now called the Arts and Humanities.

== See also ==
- Art history
- Cultural history
- Historic recurrence
- History of archaeology
- History of books
- History of education
- History of European universities
- History of knowledge
- History of mathematics
- History of writing
- Human science
- Intellectual history
- Medieval university
- Scholarly method
