= Benjamin Franklin (book) =

1938 book by Carl Van Doren

- Author: Carl Van Doren
- Language: English
- Subject: Benjamin Franklin
- Published: September 1938
- Publisher: Viking Press
- Publication place: United States
- Pages: 868
- ISBN: 9781114823686

Benjamin Franklin is a non-fiction biography written by literary critic and biographer Carl Van Doren. The book was originally published in 1938 by Viking Press; it is an authoritative telling of Franklin's life that makes heavy use of his own autobiography and his later papers and essays. The book was the 1939 recipient of the Pulitzer Prize for Biography. The book received critical acclaim upon release and has been re-released in numerous editions.

== Background ==
Van Doren signed a deal with Viking and received an advance of $3,000 to complete his biography on Benjamin Franklin. Van Doren travelled up and down New England visiting various institutions that housed Franklin's papers to research the book, including the archives at the American Philosophical Society, University of Philadelphia, along with Harvard and Yale University among others. He spent nearly every day exploring these archives for two years searching for information that had not yet been revealed in any Franklin biographies. In an early draft of the book, one of Van Doren's editors felt that the book sourced too many direct quotations from Franklin and suggested they be removed. Van Doren disagreed with this; he thought the quotations improved the writing. The extensive research caused the cost of the book to balloon beyond Van Doren's original advance, so Viking granted Van Doren a second advance of $2,000. In August 1938 Van Doren was paid a contract of $14,000 ($271,066 as of 2021) for the book's inclusion in the Book-of-the-Month-Club.

Benjamin Franklin released in September, 1938 to critical and commercial success. With the book's success, Van Doren met with Sidney Howard to discuss a stage adaptation for the book; however, the stage production was canceled after Howard's tragic death in 1939. In 1940 RKO Pictures purchased the film rights for the book, but the film was never produced.

== Contents ==
Benjamin Franklin is a narrative biography that tells the life story of Franklin through use of his autobiography and many of his essays, letters, the transcripts of events and accounts from other individuals, with additional commentary and criticism provided by Van Doren. Much of the book is expressed through Franklin's own dialog and third-person accounts. Van Doren considered the book a potential continuation of Franklin's autobiography partially in the subject's own words, as the original was never fully completed before his death in 1790. Benjamin Franklin is also considered one of the first truly exhaustive biographical explorations of Franklin's life. The book covers key details and events during Franklin's life in great detail, many times even more so than contemporary Franklin biographies.

== Reception ==
Benjamin Franklin received the Pultizer Prize for Biography in 1939. The book was overwhelmingly voted as the best biography of 1938 by 57 critics in the April 22, 1939 issue of The Lewiston Daily Sun.
