= Book and Author Luncheon =

- Genre: Talk radio
- Country of origin: United States
- Language(s): English
- Home station: WNYC
- Hosted by: Irita Bradford Van Doren
- Created by: American Booksellers Association
- Original release: October 26, 1948 – April 29, 1974
- No. of series: 21
- No. of episodes: Unknown, approx. 150 (closer to 250 luncheons were held during its run. The first 10 seasons occurred prior to the luncheon's partnership with WNYC)
- Sponsored by: American Booksellers Association, New York Herald Tribune, WNYC

The Book and Author Luncheon was created in 1938 by the American Booksellers Association. The program provided a prominent forum for authors to speak to the public about their works in one of the largest markets for books in the United States, New York City.

The ABA partnered with the New York Herald Tribune early in its first year, and with WNYC in its 11th season, in 1948. It would air on WNYC until the luncheon's end, in 1974. The Book and Author Luncheon produced 8 events per year, each with 2 to 4 speakers. It was held at a variety of locations in Manhattan, most frequently at the Waldorf Astoria. Though it predominantly featured authors as speakers, it drew from a wide variety of notable figures during its 31-year run. Some of its famous guest speakers include Vladimir Nabokov, James A. Michener, Jane Jacobs, Robert Moses, Rachel Carson, John Kenneth Galbraith, Sammy Davis Jr., Arthur M. Schlesinger Jr. and Marian Anderson, among many, many others. It was hosted for the majority of its run by New York Herald Tribune Book Review editor Irita Bradford Van Doren.
