= Hope, Illinois =

- Unincorporated community
- Location within Illinois Location within the United States
- Coordinates: 40°12′20″N 87°54′15″W
- Country: United States
- State: Illinois
- County: Vermilion
- Elevation: 715 ft (218 m)
- Time zone: UTC-6 (Central (CST))
  - Summer (DST): UTC-5 (CDT)
- Area code: 217
- GNIS feature ID: 410504

Hope is an unincorporated community in Vermilion County, Illinois, United States.

Mark Van Doren (1894–1972), poet and writer, was born in Hope.
