= Carl Van Doren =

American critic and biographer (1885–1950)

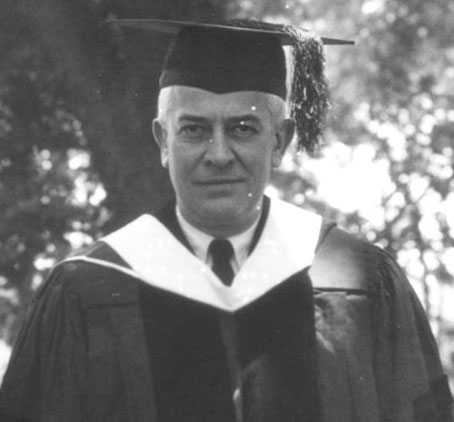
- Van Doren as the commencement speaker for the University of Kentucky in 1929
- Born: Carl Clinton Van Doren; September 10, 1885; Hope, Illinois, US
- Died: July 18, 1950 (aged 64); Torrington, Connecticut, US
- Education: University of Illinois at Urbana–Champaign (BA); Columbia University (PhD)
- Spouses: Irita Bradford (1912–1935), Jean Wright Gorman (1939–1945)

Carl Clinton Van Doren (September 10, 1885 – July 18, 1950) was an American critic and biographer. He was the brother of critic and teacher Mark Van Doren and the uncle of Charles Van Doren.

He won the 1939 Pulitzer Prize for Biography or Autobiography for Benjamin Franklin.

== Life and career ==
Van Doren was born on September 10, 1885, in Hope, Vermilion County, Illinois, the son of Eudora Ann (Butz) and Charles Lucius Van Doren, a country doctor. He and his younger brother Mark Van Doren (born 1894), were raised on the family farm.

Van Doren earned a Bachelor of Arts from the University of Illinois at Urbana–Champaign in 1907 and a doctorate from Columbia University in 1911. He continued to teach there until 1930. He was a world federalist and once said, "It is obvious that no difficulty in the way of world government can match the danger of a world without it". In 1939, he was awarded the Pulitzer Prize for Biography or Autobiography for Benjamin Franklin. In 1942, he was elected to the American Philosophical Society.

Van Doren's study The American Novel, published in 1921, is generally credited with helping to re-establish Herman Melville's critical status as first-rate literary master. He was book section editor for The Nation from 1920 to 1922.

In 1912, Van Doren married Irita Bradford, editor of the New York Herald Tribune book review. They had three daughters together: Ann born in 1915, Margaret born in 1917, and Barbara (Bobby) born in 1920. The couple divorced in 1935. Van Doren married Jean Wright Gorman in 1939, but they divorced in 1945.

Van Doren worked closely with Howard Henry Peckham on Secret History of the American Revolution (1941), editing documents from the Sir Henry Clinton (British Army officer, born 1730) (British Army Headquarters) Papers that revealed Benedict Arnold's treason during the American Revolutionary War.

Van Doren died in Torrington, Connecticut, on July 18, 1950.

== Legacy ==
A residence hall at the University of Illinois at Urbana–Champaign is named after Carl Clinton Van Doren.

== Publications ==
- The Life of Thomas Love Peacock (1911)
- The American Novel (1921 & 1940 expanded)
- American and British Literature Since 1890 (1925), co-written with Mark Van Doren
- Benjamin Franklin (1938), winner of the 1939 Pulitzer Prize for Biography or Autobiography ISBN 978-0517625323
- The Secret History of the American Revolution (1941)
- Mutiny in January: The Story of a Crisis in the Continental Army now for the first time fully told from many hitherto unknown or neglected sources both American and British. New York: The Viking Press, 1943.
- The Great Rehearsal (1948) ISBN 978-0809436194
- Jane Mecom: the Favorite Sister of Benjamin Franklin (1950) ISBN 978-0670405633
