= Ralph van Dooren =

Dutch footballer

Personal information
- Date of birth: 6 June 1981 (age 45)
- Place of birth: Maastricht, Netherlands
- Height: 1.80 m (5 ft 11 in)
- Positions: Centre-back; midfielder

Youth career
- Leonidas-Wolder

Senior career*
Years	Team	Apps	(Gls)
1999–2004	MVV	52	(1)
2004–2005	Eindhoven	11	(1)
2006	B68 Toftir	19	(1)
2006–2007	Hjørring		
2008	B68 Toftir	2	(0)
2008–2009	EVV		

International career
2001	Netherlands U20		
- * Club domestic league appearances and goals

Ralph van Dooren (born 6 June 1981) is a Dutch former professional footballer who played as a centre-back or midfielder.

== Club career ==
Van Dooren played for Eerste Divisie clubs MVV and FC Eindhoven before moving abroad to join Faroe Islands Premier League Football side B68 Toftir in March 2006. He duly became the first Dutch footballer to play in the football league of Faroe Islands. Van Dooren followed his then girlfriend to Denmark where he signed for second division club FC Hjørring for the rest of the season 2006–2007. However, he returned to B68 Toftir at the beginning of 2008.

He returned to Holland to play for amateur side EVV in November 2008, only to quit football months later after falling six meters from a balcony, injuring his back. He now works as a truck driver. Van Dooren has also coached at amateur sides SCM, FC Daalhof and Geusselt Sport.

== International career ==
Van Dooren played for the Netherlands U20 national team. Once deemed a huge talent, van Dooren's career never really took off due to ill-discipline.
