= Van Doorn =

Van Doorn is a toponymic surname of Dutch origin. The original carrier of the name may have been associated with the towns Doorn, Utrecht or Deurne, North Brabant or with a farm, homestead or other place named De(n) Doorn (="the thorn(bush)"). Variations of the name include Van Dooren, Doorn, Van Doorne, Van Doren, Van Dorin and Van Dorn.

People with the surname Van Doorn, Van Doorne, or Vandoorne include:

- Annita van Doorn (born 1983), Dutch short track speed skater
- Arnoud van Doorn (born 1966), Dutch far right politician
- Cornelis Johannes van Doorn (1837–1906), Dutch engineer and foreign advisor in Japan
- Daniel Jansen Van Doorn (born 1990), Canadian volleyball player
- Harry van Doorn (1915–1992), Dutch politician and government minister
- Herman van Doorn (born 1963), Dutch jazz and pop singer
- Hub van Doorne (1900–1979), Dutch businessman, co-founder of the DAF car manufacturing company
- J.A.A. van Doorn (1925–2008), Dutch sociologist and columnist
- Johnny van Doorn (1944–1991), Dutch writer, poet, and performer
- Marieke van Doorn (born 1960), Dutch field hockey player
- Peter van Doorn (born 1946), Dutch racing cyclist
- Sander van Doorn (born 1979), Dutch musician, DJ, and producer
- Stoffel Vandoorne (born 1992), Belgian racing driver
- Tinus van Doorn (1905–1940), Dutch Expressionist painter and graphic artist

== See also ==
- Van Dooren
- Van Doren
- Van Dorn (disambiguation)
- Van Doorne transmission, developed by Hub van Doorne
