= Irita Bradford Van Doren =

American journalist (1891-1966)

Irita Van Doren
- Irita Van Doren in 1947
- Born: Irita Bradford; March 16, 1891; Birmingham, Alabama
- Died: December 18, 1966 (aged 75)
- Education: Florida State College for Women, Columbia University
- Occupation: literary editor
- Employer(s): The Nation, New York Herald Tribune
- Spouse: Carl Van Doren
- Partner: Wendell Willkie
- Children: three
- Parents: John Taylor Bradford (father); Ida Henley née Brooks (mother)
- Relatives: Margaret Bradford Boni (sister)

Irita Bradford Van Doren (March 16, 1891 – December 18, 1966) was an American literary figure and editor of the New York Herald Tribune book review for 37 years.

== Biography ==
Born Irita Bradford in Birmingham, Alabama, she moved with her family to Tallahassee, Florida, when she was four. Her father owned and operated a sawmill there. He was killed by a disgruntled former employee when Irita was nine, leaving her mother to support four children. She gave music lessons, mostly to children, and sold homemade preserves.

Bradford graduated from the Florida State College for Women in 1908. She studied at Columbia University for her doctorate in English while teaching part-time at Hunter College.

While at Columbia, she met fellow grad student Carl Van Doren, who was studying politics and government. He was a member of the literary Van Doren family, and later won a Pulitzer Prize for his biography of Benjamin Franklin. They married in 1912, and had three daughters together. They divorced in 1935.

In 1919, she and her husband joined the staff of The Nation, where she succeeded him as literary editor in 1923. The following year, she became assistant to Stuart Sherman, book editor of the New York Herald Tribune. When he died in 1926, Van Doren succeeded him.

Holding this post until 1963, Van Doren became an influential and prominent figure in American letters. She also hosted the popular Book and Author Luncheons, sponsored by the American Booksellers Association and the Herald Tribune, from 1938 to 1963. Radio broadcasts of the luncheons on WNYC began in 1948.

Due to a mutual interest in southern history (Van Doren was the granddaughter of Union General William T. H. Brooks), she met Wendell Willkie, the Republican presidential nominee in 1940. Publicly good friends, they carried on a lengthy romantic affair. She introduced him to the literary world and assisted in writing his speeches and books.

The Irita Van Doren Book Award was established in 1960 by the publisher of the Herald Tribune.

Despite the urging of many, she never wrote her memoirs, referring to herself as "the nonwriting Van Doren".

== Bibliography ==
- New York Times, December 19, 1966
- Dictionary of American Biography, Supplement 8: 1966-1970. American Council of Learned Societies, 1988.
