= Bert Doorn =

Dutch politician (born 1949)

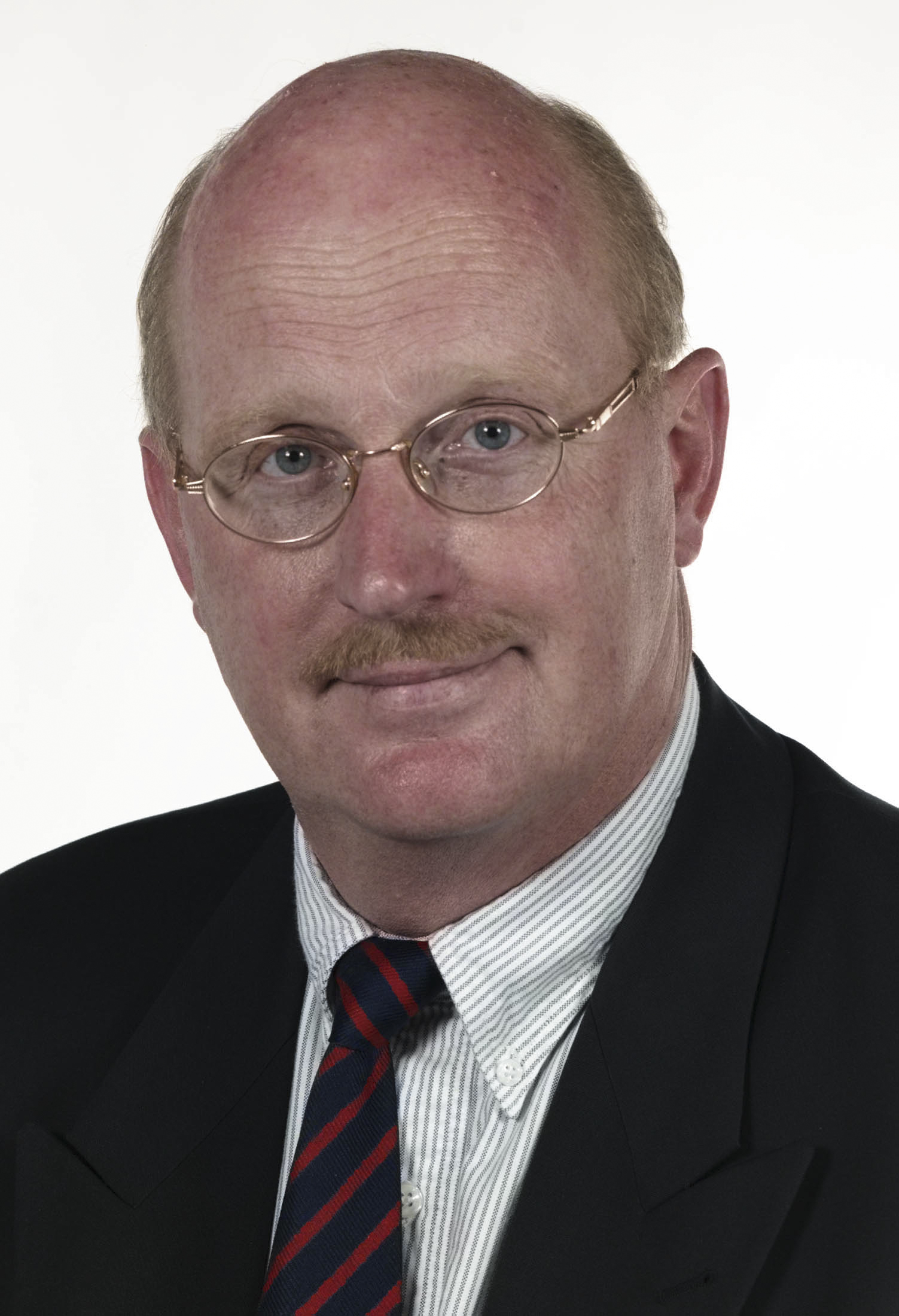
Doorn in 1999

Bert Doorn (Dutch pronunciation: [bɛr ˈdoːr(ə)n]; born 26 May 1949) is a Dutch politician and Member of the European Parliament (MEP). He is a member of the Christian Democratic Appeal, which is part of the European People's Party, and sits on the European Parliament's Committee on Legal Affairs and its Committee on the Internal Market and Consumer Protection.

He is also a member of the delegation for relations with the countries of Southeast Asia and the Association of Southeast Asian Nations, and a substitute for the delegation for relations with the Korean Peninsula.

== Biography ==
Doorn was born in Enschede, Overijssel. He studied law at Groningen (1968–1973), Nancy (1973–1974) and Freiburg (1974). He obtained a doctorate in competition law from Freiburg (1976–1978) He was Secretary for international affairs (1978–1992) and secretary for matters relating to company law (1992–1997) with the VNO (Confederation of Netherlands Industry). From 1997 to 1999, he was a company lawyer with VNO-NCW (Confederation of Netherlands Industry and Employers) (1997–1999). He was involved in various activities with the CDA, acting as Chairman of the Wassenaar section, a member of the national working party on international cooperation, and a member of the CDA's Foreign Affairs Committee.

He became a Member of the European Parliament in 1999, and represents the CDA, as a Member of the EPP Group in the European Parliament. He has been delegation leader since 2003.
