= A History of Knowledge =

1991 book by Charles Van Doren

- Author: Charles Van Doren
- Subject: Intellectual history
- Publication date: 1991
- ISBN: 0-345-37316-2
- Dewey Decimal: 001
- LC Class: AZ221

A History of Knowledge is a 1991 book on intellectual history, with emphasis on the western civilization, written by Charles Van Doren, a former editor of the Encyclopædia Britannica. It is a history of human thought covering over 5,000 years of philosophy, learning, and belief systems that surveys the key historical trends and breakthroughs connecting the globalizing human landscape of the 20th century all the way back to the scattered roots of human civilization in India, Egypt, Mesopotamia, China, Greece, and Rome.

For a sense of the tone, the first section is entitled "The Wisdom of the Ancients" and begins, "By the time written history began, some fifty centuries ago, mankind had learned much more than our primitive ancestors knew."

The book's last chapter focuses on the potential developments of the 21st century. It also contains biographies of many notable historical figures.
