= Charles Van Doren =

American writer and editor (1926–2019)

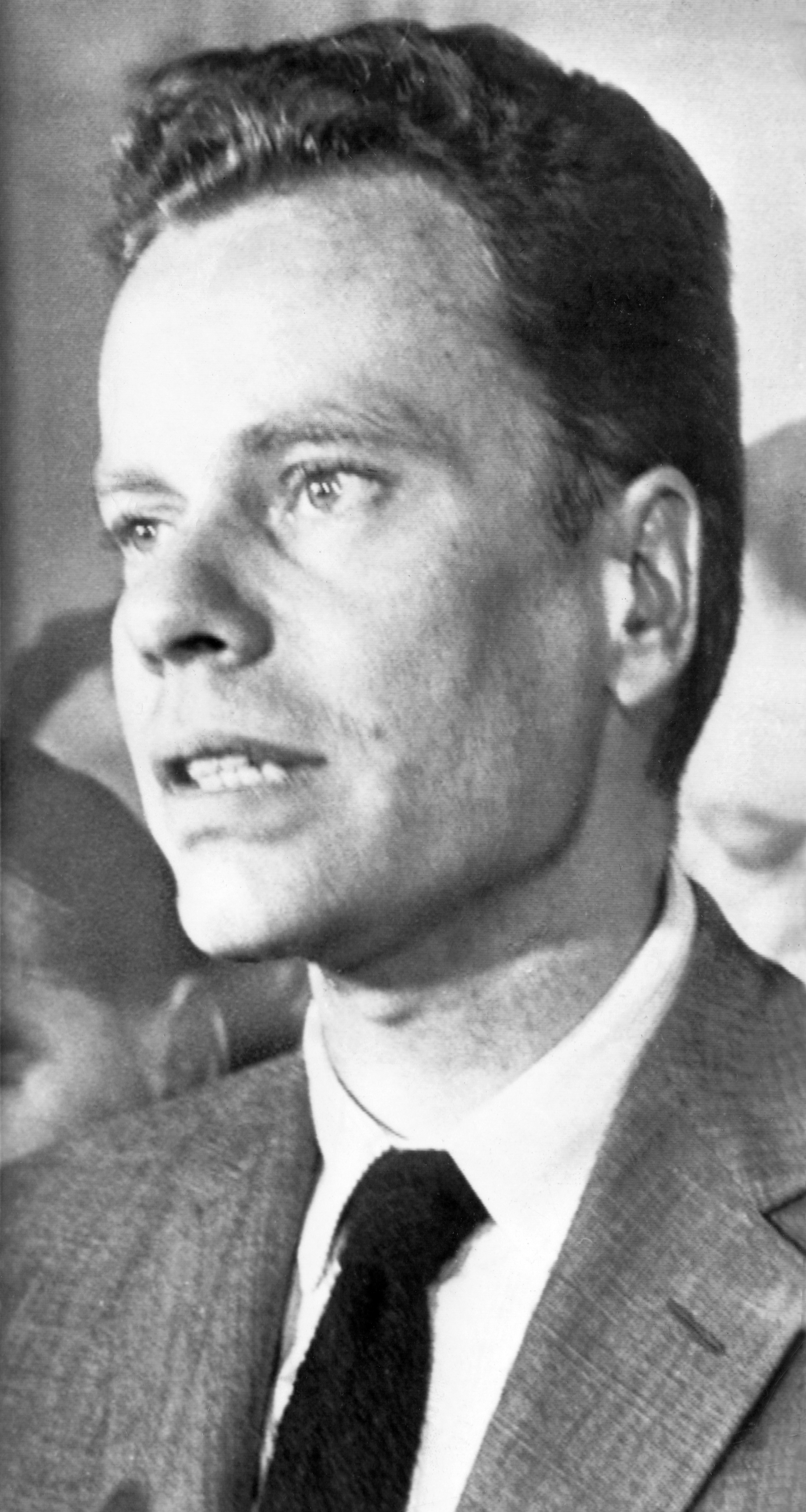
- Van Doren in 1959
- Born: Charles Lincoln Van Doren; February 12, 1926; New York City, U.S.
- Died: April 9, 2019 (aged 93); Canaan, Connecticut, U.S.
- Education: St. John's College (BA); Columbia University (MA, PhD)
- Years active: 1946−2008
- Known for: 1950s quiz show scandals
- Spouse: Geraldine Bernstein (m. 1957)
- Children: 2
- Parents: Mark Van Doren (father); Dorothy Graffe (mother)
- Relatives: Carl Van Doren (uncle); Sally Van Doren (daughter-in-law)

Charles Lincoln Van Doren (February 12, 1926 – April 9, 2019) was an American writer and editor who was involved in a television quiz show scandal in the 1950s. In 1959, he testified before the United States Congress that he had been given the correct answers by the producers of the NBC quiz show Twenty-One. Terminated by NBC, he joined Encyclopædia Britannica, Inc. in 1959, becoming a vice-president and writing and editing many books before retiring in 1982.

== Early life and education ==
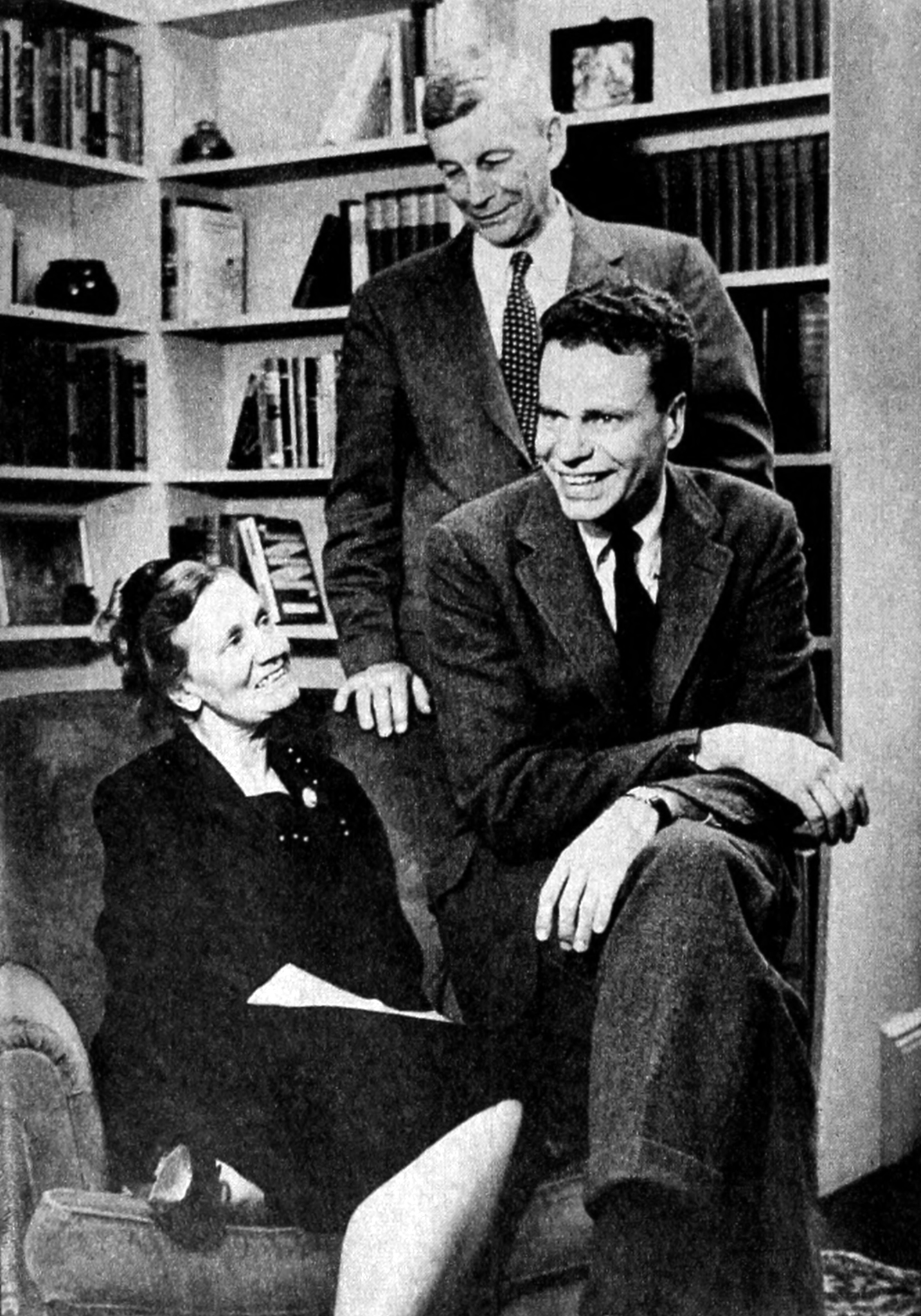
Charles Van Doren in 1957, with his parents Dorothy and Mark Van Doren

Charles Van Doren was born in February 12, 1926, in New York City, the elder son of Pulitzer Prize-winning poet, critic and professor Mark Van Doren and novelist Dorothy Van Doren (née Graffe), and a nephew of critic and Pulitzer Prize-winning biographer Carl Van Doren. He graduated from the High School of Music & Art in New York and earned a B.A. degree in Liberal Arts (1946) from St. John's College in Annapolis, Maryland. After finishing his bachelor's, he studied at the University of Cambridge and the Sorbonne University. He then earned an M.A. in astrophysics (1949) and a Ph.D. in English (1955), both at Columbia University.

== Quiz show celebrity ==
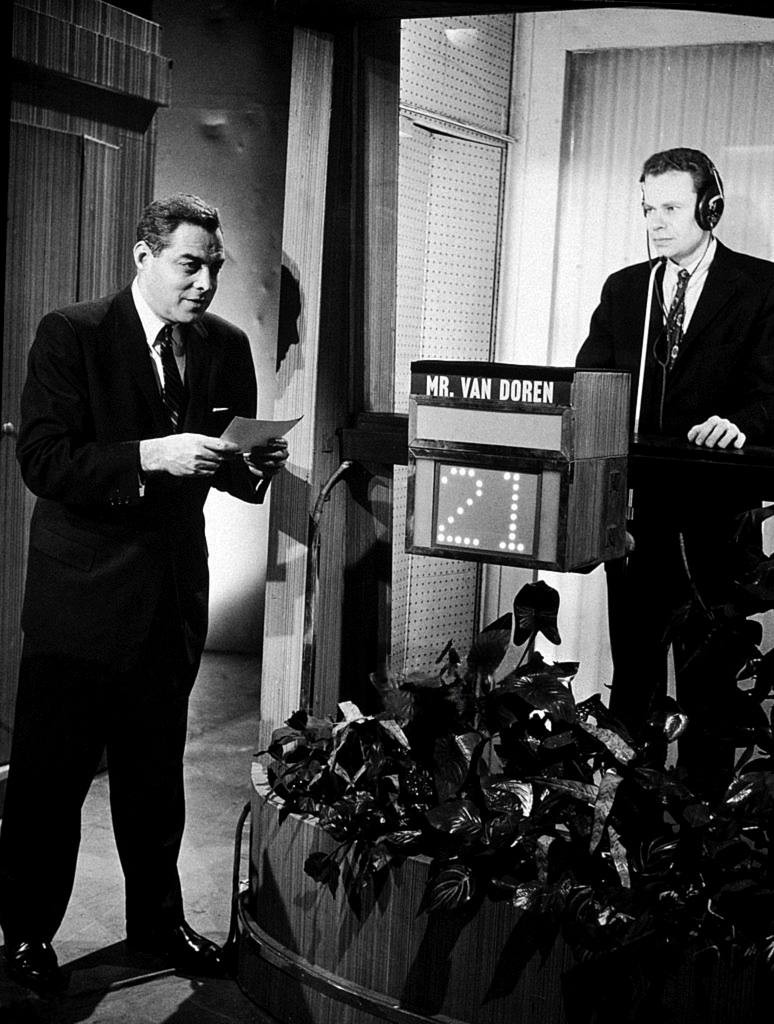
Van Doren in the isolation booth on the quiz show Twenty-One, with host Jack Barry (1957)

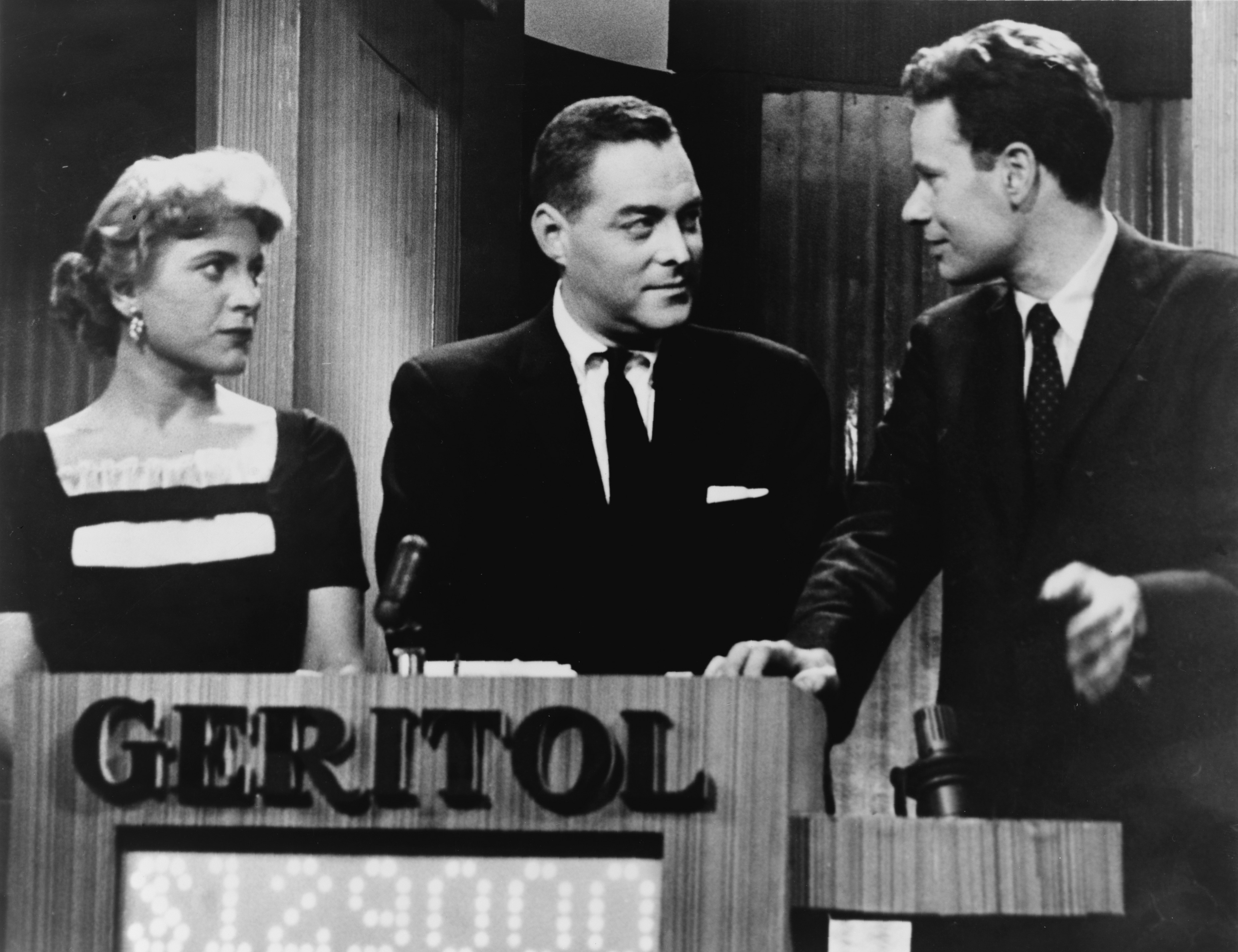
Vivienne Nearing, Jack Barry and Van Doren on Twenty-One (March 11, 1957)

On November 28, 1956, Van Doren made his first appearance on the NBC quiz show Twenty-One. Twenty-One was not Van Doren's first game show interest. He was long believed to have approached producers Dan Enright and Albert Freedman, originally, to appear on Tic-Tac-Dough, another game they produced. Van Doren eventually revealed—five decades after his Twenty-One championship and fame, in a surprise 2008 article for The New Yorker—that he did not even own a television set, but had met Freedman through a mutual friend, with Freedman initiating the idea of Van Doren going on television by way of asking what he thought of Tic-Tac-Dough.

Enright and Freedman were impressed by Van Doren's polite style and telegenic appearance, thinking the youthful Columbia teacher would be the man to defeat their incumbent Twenty-One champion, Herb Stempel, and boost the show's declining ratings as Stempel's reign continued.

In January 1957, Van Doren entered a winning streak on Twenty-One that ultimately earned him $129,000 (the equivalent of $1.5 million today) and made him famous, including an appearance on the cover of Time on February 11, 1957. His run ended on March 11, when he lost to Vivienne Nearing, a lawyer whose husband Van Doren had previously defeated. After his defeat he was offered a three-year contract with NBC worth $150,000.

There have been numerous suggestions since that Van Doren was almost immediately offered a job as a special "cultural correspondent" for Today, hosted by Dave Garroway. However, Van Doren reminded people that his first job (though short-lived) was as a newswriter, before he began doing small pieces for a weekend cultural program, Wide Wide World, also hosted by Garroway. Those pieces quickly led to Garroway inviting Van Doren to join Today. Van Doren also made guest appearances on other NBC programs, even serving as Today's substitute host when Garroway took a brief vacation.

=== Scandal ===
When allegations of cheating were first raised by Stempel and others, Van Doren denied any wrongdoing, saying, "It's silly and distressing to think that people don't have more faith in quiz shows." As the investigation by the New York District Attorney's office and eventually the United States Congress progressed, Van Doren, now host on Today, was under pressure from NBC to testify. Instead, Van Doren went into hiding in order to avoid the congressional subpoena. It was another former Twenty-One contestant, artist James Snodgrass, who would finally provide indisputable corroborating proof that the show had been rigged. Snodgrass had documented every answer he was coached on in a series of registered letters he mailed to himself prior to the broadcast.

One month after the hearings began, Van Doren emerged from hiding and confessed before Congress that he had been complicit in the fraud. On November 2, 1959, he admitted to the House Subcommittee on Legislative Oversight, a congressional subcommittee chaired by Rep. Oren Harris (D-AR), that he had been given questions and answers in advance of the show.

I was involved, deeply involved, in a deception. The fact that I, too, was very much deceived cannot keep me from being the principal victim of that deception, because I was its principal symbol. There may be a kind of justice in that. I don't know. I do know, and I can say it proudly to this committee, that since Friday, October 16, when I finally came to a full understanding of what I had done and of what I must do, I have taken a number of steps toward trying to make up for it. I have a long way to go. I have deceived my friends, and I had millions of them. Whatever their feeling for me now, my affection for them is stronger today than ever before. I am making this statement because of them. I hope my being here will serve them well and lastingly. I asked [co-producer Albert Freedman] to let me go on [Twenty-One] honestly, without receiving help. He said that was impossible. He told me that I would not have a chance to defeat Stempel because he was too knowledgeable. He also told me that the show was merely entertainment and that giving help to quiz contests was a common practice and merely a part of show business. This of course was not true, but perhaps I wanted to believe him. He also stressed the fact that by appearing on a nationally televised program I would be doing a great service to the intellectual life, to teachers and to education in general, by increasing public respect for the work of the mind through my performances. In fact, I think I have done a disservice to all of them. I deeply regret this, since I believe nothing is of more vital importance to our civilization than education.

Authorities differ regarding the audience's reaction to Van Doren's statement. David Halberstam writes in his book The Fifties:

Aware of Van Doren's great popularity, the committee members handled him gently and repeatedly praised him for his candor. Only Congressman Steve Derounian announced that he saw no particular point in praising someone of Van Doren's exceptional talents and intelligence for simply telling the truth. With that, the room suddenly exploded with applause, and [Congressional investigator] Richard N. Goodwin knew at that moment ordinary people would not so easily forgive Van Doren.

By contrast, William Manchester, in his narrative history The Glory and the Dream, recounts a diametrically opposite response:

The crowd at the hearing had been with Van Doren, applauding him and his admirers on the subcommittee and greeting Congressman Derounian's comment with stony silence.

An Associated Press story dated November 2, 1959, seems to verify Halberstam's version of events:

While there was a burst of applause when Mr. Harris dismissed Mr. Van Doren with a "God bless you", there was applause, too, when Rep. Steven B. Derounian, Republican, New York, declined to go along with compliments that other committee members showered on the witness for telling the truth. "I don't think an adult of your intelligence ought to be commended for telling the truth," Mr. Derounian declared in severe tones. Mr. Van Doren winced, flushed, and ducked his head.

== Later career and death ==
Van Doren was dropped by NBC and resigned from his post as an English instructor at Columbia University. He became an editor at Praeger Books and a pseudonymous (at first) writer, before becoming an editor of the Encyclopædia Britannica and the author of several books, of which his 1991 popular-market A History of Knowledge may be his best known. Van Doren also co-authored a well-received revision of How to Read a Book with its original author, philosopher Mortimer J. Adler, and co-edited with him a 1,771-page anthology titled Great Treasury of Western Thought (1977). He had already worked with Adler on an 18-volume collection of documents covering American history, entitled The Annals of America (1968), which was accompanied by a two-volume, 1,300-page "topical index" organized around 25 themes and entitled Great Issues in American Life: A Conspectus.

In his 2008 article in The New Yorker, Van Doren revealed that he had actually been contemplating the Britannica job even at the height of his celebrity. His father had suggested the possibility to him during a long walk around the farmlands they both loved. The elder Van Doren mentioned to his son that Adler, the philosopher and a member of Britannica's board of editors, had spoken of making Van Doren its editor-in-chief. Van Doren eventually accepted the job, he would write, by way of intercession from a former college roommate. Van Doren retired from Britannica in 1982.

Van Doren also revealed he had been offered an opportunity to participate in a PBS series on the history of philosophy, but that its tentative producer, Julian Krainin, might actually have had in mind Van Doren's explicit cooperation on a planned PBS program recalling the quiz show scandals. When that did not occur (though the program thanked Van Doren explicitly, among other credits), he wrote, Krainin later sought his cooperation and consultation when Robert Redford was beginning to make Quiz Show—even conveying that Van Doren would be paid in six figures for it. After wrestling with the idea—and, he wrote, noting his wife's objections—Van Doren rejected it. Van Doren finally broke his silence on the quiz show scandal in the New Yorker article.

Van Doren had refused interviews or public comment on the subject of the quiz show scandals. In a 1985 interview on Today—his only appearance on the program since his dismissal in 1959, promoting his book The Joy of Reading—he answered a general question on how the scandal changed his life. He revisited Columbia University only twice in the forty years that followed his resignation – in 1984 when his son John graduated; and in 1999 at a reunion of Columbia's Class of 1959. During the latter appearance, Van Doren made one allusion to the quiz scandal without mentioning it by name:

Some of you read with me forty years ago a portion of Aristotle's Ethics, a selection of passages that describe his idea of happiness. You may not remember too well. I remember better, because, despite the abrupt caesura in my academic career that occurred in 1959, I have gone on teaching the humanities almost continually to students of all kinds and ages. In case you don't remember, then, I remind you that according to Aristotle happiness is not a feeling or sensation but instead is the quality of a whole life. The emphasis is on "whole," a life from beginning to end. Especially the end. The last part, the part you're now approaching, was for Aristotle the most important for happiness. It makes sense, doesn't it?

In 2005, Van Doren joined the faculty of the University of Connecticut, Torrington; the campus was closed in 2016. Van Doren spent the last years of his life with his wife, Gerry, in a "small, old house" (his words) on the land his parents bought in Cornwall, Connecticut, in the 1920s.

Van Doren died in a retirement community of natural causes in Canaan, Connecticut, on April 9, 2019, at age 93. Herb Stempel, the opponent he defeated to win his first game of Twenty One, died on April 7, 2020, almost exactly one year after Van Doren's death, and at the same age; Stempel's death was not publicly announced until nearly two months later.

== Cultural references ==
=== "The Quiz Show Scandal" ===
"The Quiz Show Scandal" is a documentary that first aired on PBS on January 6, 1992, as an episode of the fourth season of American Experience. Produced by Julian Krainin and Michael R. Lawrence, the one-hour program explored the corruption of the 1950s quiz show scandals, particularly that involving Van Doren and Twenty-One. Van Doren spoke with the producers but eventually declined to participate in the program. "The Quiz Show Scandal" was one of the most popular episodes of the series.

=== Quiz Show film ===
The story of the quiz show scandal and Van Doren's role in it is depicted in the 1994 film Quiz Show, produced and directed by Robert Redford, in which Van Doren is portrayed by Ralph Fiennes. The film made $24 million by April 1995, and was nominated for Academy Awards in the categories of Best Picture, Best Director, Best Actor in a Supporting Role, and Best Adapted Screenplay.

The film earned several critiques questioning its use of dramatic license, its accuracy, and the motivation behind its making. The movie's critics have included Joseph Stone, the New York prosecutor who began the investigations, Jeffrey Hart, a Dartmouth College scholar and senior editor of National Review, and a longtime friend of Van Doren, who saw the film as falsely implying tension between Van Doren and the latter's accomplished father.

=== Freedomland U.S.A.: The Definitive History ===
Van Doren is mentioned in a book, Freedomland U.S.A.: The Definitive History (Theme Park Press, 2019), that references his connection to the now-defunct Freedomland U.S.A. theme park that was located in The Bronx in New York City. He was the master of ceremonies for the groundbreaking event for the park on August 26, 1959.

=== Rigged on a Fix ===
Charles Van Doren and 1950s quiz show scandals were referenced in the track Rigged on a Fix from the self-titled album Rancid by the American punk rock band Rancid.

== Published works ==
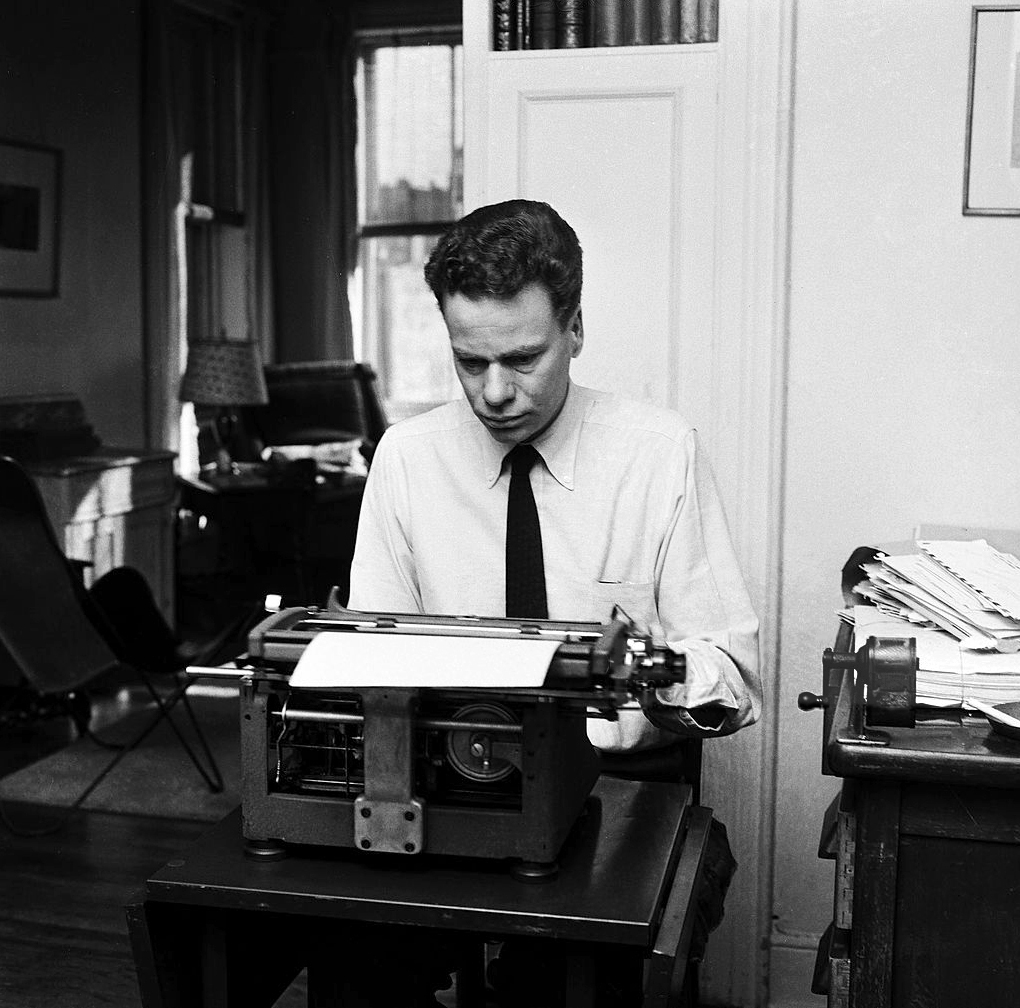
Van Doren at home (1957)

=== Books ===
- 1957: Lincoln's Commando: The Biography of Commander W. B. Cushing, U.S.N. (with Ralph J. Roske). OCLC 522555
- 1959: Letters to Mother; An Anthology (editor). OCLC 968352356
- 1968: The Annals of America, 20 volumes, (executive editor, with Mortimer J. Adler, editor in chief). OCLC 1139
- 1969: The Negro in American History, three volumes (editor, with Mortimer J. Adler, general editor; George Ducas, executive editor). OCLC 10992
- 1972: How to Read a Book: The Classic Guide to Intelligent Reading, with Mortimer J. Adler; updated and rewritten version of the book originally published by Adler in 1940. ISBN 978-0671212803
- 1977: Great Treasury of Western Thought, co-edited with Mortimer J. Adler. ISBN 978-0835208338
- 1980: Shakespeare: Reading and Talking. ISBN 978-0932676207
- 1984: Webster's American Biographies (editor, with Robert McHenry, associate editor). ISBN 978-0877792536
- 1985: The Joy of Reading. ISBN 978-0517555804
- 1991: A History of Knowledge: Past, Present and Future. ISBN 978-1559720373
- 2013: The Lion of Cortona: A Novel of the Middle Ages (three volumes). ISBN 978-1484989647

=== Articles ===
==== "All the Answers" ====
The July 28, 2008, issue of The New Yorker included a personal reminiscence titled "All the Answers", written by Van Doren, in which he recounted in detail the scandals and their aftermath. Other than very occasional and often very abbreviated references to it, Van Doren had never before spoken publicly about the scandal, his role, and its effects on his life.

He referred to the film Quiz Show, saying he was bothered most by the closing credits' reference that he never taught again: "I didn't stop teaching, though it was a long time before I taught again in a college." But he also said he enjoyed John Turturro's portrayal of his Twenty-One rival, Herb Stempel.

The article also contradicted many impressions of Van Doren that the film had created: the film portrayed him as a bachelor when he was actually engaged; it suggested he had a fascination with the burgeoning, popular television quiz shows when in fact he did not even own a television set; that the only reason he became even mildly acquainted with Twenty-One was because co-producer Al Freedman shared a mutual acquaintance with one of Van Doren's friends; and that he had been offered his job with Today promptly after losing to Vivien Nearing when, in fact, NBC was not sure at first what to do with him, until he did work for Dave Garroway's Sunday afternoon cultural show, Wide Wide World, which then led to the invitation to join Today.

Van Doren also addressed and denied the film's insinuations that he had been friends with Congressional investigator Richard Goodwin while Van Doren was Twenty-One's reigning champion (and during and after the start of Herb Stempel's efforts to expose the show's being rigged). According to Van Doren, the two men had not met until August 1959, when the subcommittee Goodwin served as counsel for had begun investigating the quiz shows and Van Doren was already established on The Today Show.
