= Van Dorn =

Van Dorn or Van Dorne may refer to:

== People ==
- Earl Van Dorn (1820–1863), Confederate major general
- Elizabeth Van Dorn, stage name of Bessie De Voie (1880s–1974), American actress and dancer
- Frans van Dorne (1776–1848), Flemish portrait painter
- Martin van Dorne (1736–1808), Flemish still-life painter and poet
- Peter Aaron Van Dorn (1773–1837), American lawyer, judge and cotton planter

== Other uses ==
- Alfalfa, Alabama, United States, an unincorporated community originally named Van Dorn
- Camp Van Dorn, Centreville, Mississippi, United States, a World War II military installation
- Van Dorn Street, another name for Virginia State Route 401, a state highway
- Van Dorn Detective Agency, a fictional agency created by Clive Cussler
- Jeremy Van Dorn, a fictional character in the miniseries Dynasty: The Reunion

== See also ==
- Van Dorn House, Port Gibson, Mississippi, United States, on the National Register of Historic Places
- CSS General Earl Van Dorn, a Confederate cottonclad warship
- Van Dorn Street station, a Washington Metro station
- Van Dorn Hooker (1921–2015), American architect
- Van Doorn, a surname
- Vân Đồn district, Vietnam
