= 2003–04 United States network television schedule (daytime) =

The following is the 2003–04 daytime network television schedule for the five major English-language commercial broadcast networks in the United States in operation during that television season. It covers the weekday daytime hours from September 2003 to August 2004. The schedule is followed by a list per network of returning series, new series, and series canceled after the 2002–03 season.

Affiliates fill time periods not occupied by network programs with local or syndicated programming. PBS – which offers daytime programming through a children's program block, PBS Kids – is not included, as its member television stations have local flexibility over most of their schedules and broadcast times for network shows may vary. Also not included are UPN (as the network did not offer any daytime programs this season), and PAX, as its schedule is composed mainly of syndicated reruns although it also carried some first-run programs.

On April 8, 2004, all three major networks – ABC, CBS and NBC – cleared their daytime schedules to carry the testimony of Condoleezza Rice, the National Security Advisor, to the independent commission investigating the September 11 attacks. PBS also made the testimony available to its member stations, which could choose whether to broadcast it or to stick to their regular lineups.

== Legend ==
- Light yellow indicates talk shows.
- Green indicates soap operas.
- Pink indicates game shows.
- Gold indicates news programming.
- White indicates local programming.
- Gray indicates encore programming (e.g., reruns of prime-time programming).
- Light teal indicates sporting events.
- Light purple indicates children's programming.
- New series are highlighted in **bold**.

== Schedule ==
- All times correspond to U.S. Eastern and Pacific Time scheduling (except for some live sports or events). Except where affiliates slot certain programs outside their network-dictated timeslots, subtract one hour for Central, Mountain, Alaska, and Hawaii-Aleutian times.
- Local schedules may differ, as affiliates have the option to pre-empt or delay network programs. Such scheduling may be limited to preemptions caused by local or national breaking news or weather coverage (which may force stations to tape delay certain programs in overnight timeslots or defer them to a co-operated or other contracted station in their regular timeslot) and any major sports events scheduled to air in a weekday timeslot (mainly during major holidays). Stations may air shows at other times at their preference.

=== Monday-Friday ===
Network		7:00 am	7:30 am	8:00 am	8:30 am	9:00 am	9:30 am	10:00 am	10:30 am	11:00 am	11:30 am	noon	12:30 pm	1:00 pm	1:30 pm	2:00 pm	2:30 pm	3:00 pm	3:30 pm	4:00 pm	4:30 pm	5:00 pm	5:30 pm	6:00 pm	6:30 pm
ABC		Good Morning America				Local and/or syndicated programming				The View		Local and/or syndicated programming		All My Children		One Life to Live		General Hospital		Local and/or syndicated programming					ABC World News Tonight with Peter Jennings
CBS		The Early Show				Local and/or syndicated programming				The Price is Right		Local and/or syndicated programming	The Young and the Restless		The Bold and the Beautiful	As the World Turns		Guiding Light		Local and/or syndicated programming					CBS Evening News with Dan Rather
NBC		Today						Local and/or syndicated programming						Days of Our Lives		Passions		Local and/or syndicated programming							NBC Nightly News with Tom Brokaw
The WB	Fall	Local and/or syndicated programming																		Scooby-Doo / What's New Scooby-Doo? (Oct. 20-24/Nov. 10-21)	Jackie Chan Adventures	Pokémon	Yu-Gi-Oh!	Local and/or syndicated programming	
The WB	January	Local and/or syndicated programming																		Jackie Chan Adventures / What's New, Scooby-Doo? (Mar. 22-26) / Astro Boy (Apr. 19-30)	Static Shock	Pokémon	Yu-Gi-Oh!	Local and/or syndicated programming	
The WB	May	Local and/or syndicated programming																		Static Shock	MegaMan NT Warrior	Pokémon	Yu-Gi-Oh!	Local and/or syndicated programming	
The WB	June	Local and/or syndicated programming																		Static Shock	Ozzy & Drix	Pokémon	Pokémon	Local and/or syndicated programming	
The WB	August	Local and/or syndicated programming																		Jackie Chan Adventures	¡Mucha Lucha!	Pokémon	Yu-Gi-Oh!	Local and/or syndicated programming	

CBS note: Beginning in March 2004, CBS offered its affiliates two feeds of Guiding Light: one airing at 10:00 am and one airing at 3:00 pm (both Eastern). Before that time, CBS affiliates that aired Guiding Light outside of the network's recommended 3:00 pm Eastern timeslot had to tape-delay the program to the following morning.

=== Saturday ===
Network		7:00 am	7:30 am	8:00 am	8:30 am	9:00 am	9:30 am	10:00 am	10:30 am	11:00 am	11:30 am	noon	12:30 pm	1:00 pm	1:30 pm	2:00 pm	2:30 pm	3:00 pm	3:30 pm	4:00 pm	4:30 pm	5:00 pm	5:30 pm	6:00 pm	6:30 pm
ABC	Fall	Local and/or syndicated programming		**Lilo & Stitch: The Series**	Recess	Fillmore!	The Proud Family	Lizzie McGuire	**That's So Raven**	Kim Possible	Power Rangers Ninja Storm	Power Rangers Ninja Storm	NBA Inside Stuff	College Football on ABC											
ABC	Spring	Local and/or syndicated programming		**Lilo & Stitch: The Series**	Recess	Fillmore!	The Proud Family	Lizzie McGuire	**That's So Raven**	Kim Possible	**Power Rangers Dino Thunder**	**Power Rangers Dino Thunder**	NBA Inside Stuff	ABC Sports and/or local programming				ABC Sports programming						Local news	ABC World News Saturday
CBS	Fall	The Wild Thornberrys	Hey Arnold!	ChalkZone	Little Bill	The Saturday Early Show				Dora the Explorer	Blue's Clues	SEC on CBS													
CBS	Winter	The Wild Thornberrys	Hey Arnold!	ChalkZone	Little Bill	The Saturday Early Show				Dora the Explorer	Blue's Clues	CBS Sports and/or local programming						CBS Sports programming						Local news	CBS Evening News
CBS	Spring	Hey Arnold!	ChalkZone	**All Grown Up**	**The Brothers Garcia**	The Saturday Early Show				Dora the Explorer	Blue's Clues	CBS Sports and/or local programming						CBS Sports programming						Local news	CBS Evening News
NBC	Fall	Local and/or syndicated programming		Today				Croc Files	**Jeff Corwin Unleashed**	Trading Spaces: Boys vs. Girls	Endurance	Strange Days at Blake Holsey High	Scout's Safari	NBC Sports and/or local programming				NBC Sports programming						Local news	NBC Nightly News
NBC	November	Local and/or syndicated programming		Today				**Kenny the Shark**	**Tutenstein**	Trading Spaces: Boys vs. Girls	Endurance	Strange Days at Blake Holsey High	Scout's Safari	NBC Sports and/or local programming				NBC Sports programming						Local news	NBC Nightly News
NBC	July	Local and/or syndicated programming		Today				**Kenny the Shark**	**Skunked TV**	**Tutenstein**	Trading Spaces: Boys vs. Girls	Strange Days at Blake Holsey High	Scout's Safari	NBC Sports and/or local programming				NBC Sports programming						Local news	NBC Nightly News
NBC	August	Local and/or syndicated programming		Today		Strange Days at Blake Holsey High	Scout's Safari	**Kenny the Shark**	**Skunked TV**	**Tutenstein**	Trading Spaces: Boys vs. Girls	2004 Summer Olympics												Local news	NBC Nightly News
Fox	Fall	Local and/or syndicated programming		Cubix: Robots for Everyone	Ultimate Muscle: The Kinnikuman Legacy	Kirby: Right Back at Ya!	**Sonic X**	**Shaman King**	Teenage Mutant Ninja Turtles	The Cramp Twins	**Funky Cops**	NFL Under the Helmet	Fox Sports and/or local programming												
Fox	November	Local and/or syndicated programming		Cubix: Robots for Everyone	Ultimate Muscle: The Kinnikuman Legacy	Kirby: Right Back at Ya!	**Sonic X**	**Shaman King**	Teenage Mutant Ninja Turtles	The Cramp Twins	**Sonic X**	NFL Under the Helmet	Fox Sports and/or local programming												
Fox	December	Local and/or syndicated programming		Cubix: Robots for Everyone	Teenage Mutant Ninja Turtles	Kirby: Right Back at Ya!	**Sonic X**	**Shaman King**	Teenage Mutant Ninja Turtles	Ultimate Muscle: The Kinnikuman Legacy	**Sonic X**	NFL Under the Helmet	Fox Sports and/or local programming												
Fox	February	Local and/or syndicated programming		Cubix: Robots for Everyone	Teenage Mutant Ninja Turtles	Kirby: Right Back at Ya!	**Shaman King**	**Sonic X**	Teenage Mutant Ninja Turtles	Ultimate Muscle: The Kinnikuman Legacy	**Sonic X**	Fox Sports and/or local programming													
Fox	March	Local and/or syndicated programming		Cubix: Robots for Everyone	**Sonic X**	Kirby: Right Back at Ya!	Teenage Mutant Ninja Turtles	**Sonic X**	**Shaman King**	Ultimate Muscle: The Kinnikuman Legacy	Kirby: Right Back at Ya!	Local and/or syndicated programming	This Week in Baseball	Fox Sports and/or local programming											
Fox	Summer	Local and/or syndicated programming		**Winx Club**	**Martin Mystery** (May) / **Shaman King** (July 31)	**Shaman King**	Teenage Mutant Ninja Turtles	**Sonic X**	Kirby: Right Back at Ya! / Winx Club (July)	**The Menu**	**Winx Club** / Kirby: Right Back at Ya! (July)	Local and/or syndicated programming	This Week in Baseball	Fox Sports and/or local programming											
The WB	Fall	Local and/or syndicated programming		What's New Scooby-Doo?	Yu-Gi-Oh!	Jackie Chan Adventures	Ozzy & Drix	Pokémon	¡Mucha Lucha!	Yu-Gi-Oh!	X-Men: Evolution	Local and/or syndicated programming													
The WB	November	Local and/or syndicated programming		Yu-Gi-Oh!	**Teen Titans**	Jackie Chan Adventures	**Xiaolin Showdown**	Pokémon	¡Mucha Lucha!	Yu-Gi-Oh!	Pokémon	Local and/or syndicated programming													
The WB	February	Local and/or syndicated programming		Jackie Chan Adventures	**Astro Boy** (Jan. 17-Feb. 7) / Static Shock	Teen Titans	**Xiaolin Showdown**	Pokémon	Pokémon / MegaMan NT Warrior (May)	Yu-Gi-Oh!	¡Mucha Lucha!	Local and/or syndicated programming													
The WB	June	Local and/or syndicated programming		**Codename: Kids Next Door**	¡Mucha Lucha!	Teen Titans	**Xiaolin Showdown**	Pokémon	Static Shock	Yu-Gi-Oh!	MegaMan: NT Warrior	Local and/or syndicated programming													
The WB	July	Local and/or syndicated programming		Jackie Chan Adventures	¡Mucha Lucha!	Teen Titans	**Xiaolin Showdown**	Pokémon	Static Shock	Yu-Gi-Oh!	MegaMan: NT Warrior	Local and/or syndicated programming													

=== Sunday ===
Network		7:00 am	7:30 am	8:00 am	8:30 am	9:00 am	9:30 am	10:00 am	10:30 am	11:00 am	11:30 am	noon	12:30 pm	1:00 pm	1:30 pm	2:00 pm	2:30 pm	3:00 pm	3:30 pm	4:00 pm	4:30 pm	5:00 pm	5:30 pm	6:00 pm	6:30 pm
ABC		Local and/or syndicated programming						This Week with George Stephanopoulos		ABC Sports and/or local programming														ABC World News Sunday	Local news
CBS	Fall	Local and/or syndicated programming				CBS News Sunday Morning			Face the Nation	Local and/or syndicated programming		NFL Today		NFL on CBS											
CBS	Mid-winter	Local and/or syndicated programming				CBS News Sunday Morning			Face the Nation	Local and/or syndicated programming		CBS Sports and/or local programming												CBS Evening News	Local news
NBC		Local and/or syndicated programming		Today		Meet the Press		Local and/or syndicated programming				NBC Sports and/or local programming												Local news	NBC Nightly News
Fox	Fall	Local and/or syndicated programming				Fox News Sunday		Local and/or syndicated programming				Fox NFL Sunday		Fox NFL (and sometimes another Fox Sports event and/or local programming)											
Fox	Mid-winter	Local and/or syndicated programming				Fox News Sunday		Local and/or syndicated programming				Fox Sports and/or local programming												Local and/or syndicated programming	

== By network ==
=== ABC ===
Returning series:

- ABC World News Tonight with Peter Jennings
- All My Children
- General Hospital
- Good Morning America
- One Life to Live
- This Week with George Stephanopoulos
- The View
- ABC Kids
  - Fillmore!
  - Kim Possible
  - Lizzie McGuire
  - NBA Inside Stuff
  - Power Rangers Ninja Storm
  - The Proud Family
  - Recess

New series:

- ABC Kids
  - **Lilo & Stitch: The Series**
  - **Power Rangers Dino Thunder**
  - **That's So Raven**

Not returning from 2002–03:

- Port Charles
- ABC Kids
  - Power Rangers Wild Force
  - Teamo Supremo

=== CBS ===
Returning series:

- As the World Turns
- The Bold and the Beautiful
- The Early Show
- CBS Evening News with Dan Rather
- CBS News Sunday Morning with Charles Osgood
- Face the Nation
- Guiding Light
- The Price is Right
- The Saturday Early Show
- The Young and the Restless
- Nick on CBS
  - ChalkZone
  - Hey Arnold!
  - The Wild Thornberrys
- Nick Jr. on CBS
  - Blue's Clues
  - Dora the Explorer
  - Little Bill

New series:

- Nick on CBS
  - **All Grown Up!**
  - **The Brothers Garcia**

Not returning from 2002–03:

- Nick on CBS
  - As Told by Ginger
  - Pelswick
  - Rugrats

=== NBC ===
Returning series:

- Days of Our Lives
- Meet the Press
- NBC Nightly News with Tom Brokaw
- Passions
- Today with Katie Couric and Matt Lauer
- Discovery Kids on NBC
  - Croc Files
  - Endurance
  - Scout's Safari
  - Trading Spaces: Boys vs. Girls
  - Strange Days at Blake Holsey High

New series:

- Discovery Kids on NBC
  - **Jeff Corwin Unleashed**
  - **Kenny the Shark**
  - **Skunked TV**
  - **Tutenstein**

Not returning from 2002–03:

- Discovery Kids on NBC
  - Adventure Camp
  - Operation Junkyard
  - Prehistoric Planet

=== Fox ===
Returning series:

- Fox Box
  - The Cramp Twins
  - Cubix: Robots for Everyone (moved from Kids' WB)
  - Kirby: Right Back at Ya!
  - Teenage Mutant Ninja Turtles
  - Ultimate Muscle: The Kinnikuman Legacy
- Fox News Sunday
- Fox Sports
  - NFL Under the Helmet
  - This Week in Baseball

New series:

- Fox Box
  - **Funky Cops**
  - **Martin Mystery**
  - **Shaman King**
  - **Sonic X**
  - **Winx Club**
- Fox Sports
  - **The Menu**

Not returning from 2002–03:

- Fox Box
  - Back to the Future
  - Fighting Foodons
  - Pirate Islands
  - Stargate Infinity
  - Ultraman Tiga
  - WMAC Masters

=== UPN ===
Not returning from 2002–03:

- Disney's One Too
  - Buzz Lightyear of Star Command
  - Digimon Frontier
  - The Legend of Tarzan
  - Recess

=== The WB ===
Returning series:

- Kids WB!
  - Jackie Chan Adventures
  - MegaMan: NT Warrior
  - ¡Mucha Lucha!
  - Ozzy & Drix
  - Pokémon: Master Quest / Pokémon: Advanced
  - Scooby-Doo
  - Static Shock
  - What's New Scooby-Doo?
  - X-Men: Evolution
  - Yu-Gi-Oh!

New series:

- Kids WB!
  - **Astro Boy**
  - **Codename: Kids Next Door**
  - **Teen Titans**
  - **Xiaolin Showdown**

Not returning from 2002–03:

- Kids WB!
  - Cubix: Robots for Everyone (moved to FoxBox)
  - The Mummy: The Animated Series
  - Rescue Heroes: Global Response Team

== See also ==
- 2003–04 United States network television schedule (prime-time)
- 2003–04 United States network television schedule (late night)
