= 2006–07 United States network television schedule (daytime) =

The following is the 2006–07 daytime network television schedule for the five major English-language commercial broadcast networks in the United States in operation during that television season. It covers the weekday daytime hours from September 2006 to August 2007. The schedule is followed by a list per network of returning series, new series, and series canceled after the 2005–06 season.

Affiliates fill time periods not occupied by network programs with local or syndicated programming. PBS – which offers daytime programming through a children's program block, PBS Kids – is not included, as its member television stations have local flexibility over most of their schedules and broadcast times for network shows may vary. Fox does not offer daytime network programming nor network news on weekdays; as such, schedules are only included for Saturdays and Sundays. Also not included are MyNetworkTV (as the network also does not offer daytime programs of any kind), The CW Plus (as its schedule composed mainly of syndicated reruns), and Ion Television (which only supplies programming from their Qubo block as its schedule features syndicated reruns).

The 2006–2007 season was the final one for Passions on NBC, before the daytime soap opera moved to DirecTV.

== Legend ==
- Light yellow indicates talk shows.
- Green indicates soap operas.
- Pink indicates game shows.
- Gold indicates news programming.
- White indicates local programming.
- Gray indicates encore programming (e.g., reruns of prime-time programming).
- Light teal indicates sporting events.
- Light purple indicates children's programming.
- New series are highlighted in **bold**.

== Schedule ==
- All times correspond to U.S. Eastern and Pacific Time scheduling (except for some live sports or events). Except where affiliates slot certain programs outside their network-dictated timeslots, subtract one hour for Central, Mountain, Alaska, and Hawaii-Aleutian times.
- Local schedules may differ, as affiliates have the option to pre-empt or delay network programs. Such scheduling may be limited to preemptions caused by local or national breaking news or weather coverage (which may force stations to tape delay certain programs in overnight timeslots or defer them to a co-operated or other contracted station in their regular timeslot) and any major sports events scheduled to air in a weekday timeslot (mainly during major holidays). Stations may air shows at other times at their preference.

=== Monday-Friday ===
Network	7:00 am	7:30 am	8:00 am	8:30 am	9:00 am	9:30 am	10:00 am	10:30 am	11:00 am	11:30 am	noon	12:30 pm	1:00 pm	1:30 pm	2:00 pm	2:30 pm	3:00 pm	3:30 pm	4:00 pm	4:30 pm	5:00 pm	5:30 pm	6:00 pm	6:30 pm
ABC	Good Morning America				Local and/or syndicated programming				The View		Local and/or syndicated programming		All My Children		One Life to Live		General Hospital		Local and/or syndicated programming					ABC World News with Charles Gibson
CBS	The Early Show				Local and/or syndicated programming				The Price Is Right		Local and/or syndicated programming	The Young and the Restless		The Bold and the Beautiful	As the World Turns		Guiding Light		Local and/or syndicated programming					CBS Evening News with Katie Couric
NBC	Today						Local and/or syndicated programming						Days of Our Lives		Passions		Local and/or syndicated programming							NBC Nightly News with Brian Williams
The CW	Local and/or syndicated programming																		What I Like About You (R)	What I Like About You (R)	Reba (R)	Reba (R)	Local and/or syndicated programming	

NBC note: Passions aired its final episode on NBC on September 7, 2007; it moved to The 101 Network beginning with the September 17 episode. The following Monday, the network returned the 2 pm timeslot to its affiliates. In exchange, NBC took back the 10:00 am timeslot from its affiliates, as Today expanded to four hours that same day.

=== Saturday ===
Network		7:00 am	7:30 am	8:00 am	8:30 am	9:00 am	9:30 am	10:00 am	10:30 am	11:00 am	11:30 am	noon	12:30 pm	1:00 pm	1:30 pm	2:00 pm	2:30 pm	3:00 pm	3:30 pm	4:00 pm	4:30 pm	5:00 pm	5:30 pm	6:00 pm	6:30 pm
ABC	Fall	Local and/or syndicated programming		Good Morning America		The Emperor's New School	**The Replacements**	That's So Raven	That's So Raven	**Hannah Montana**	The Suite Life of Zack and Cody	Power Rangers Mystic Force	Power Rangers Mystic Force	College Football on ABC											
ABC	Winter	Local and/or syndicated programming		Good Morning America		The Emperor's New School	**The Replacements**	That's So Raven	That's So Raven	**Hannah Montana**	The Suite Life of Zack and Cody	Power Rangers Mystic Force	Power Rangers Mystic Force	NBA Access with Ahmad Rashad	ABC Sports and/or local programming			ABC Sports programming						Local news	ABC World News Saturday
ABC	Spring	Local and/or syndicated programming		Good Morning America		The Emperor's New School	**The Replacements**	That's So Raven	That's So Raven	**Hannah Montana**	The Suite Life of Zack and Cody	**Power Rangers Operation Overdrive**	**Power Rangers Operation Overdrive**	NBA Access with Ahmad Rashad	ABC Sports and/or local programming			ABC Sports programming						Local news	ABC World News Saturday
CBS	Fall	**Madeline**	Sabrina: The Animated Series	**Trollz**	**Horseland**	The Saturday Early Show				**Cake**	**Dance Revolution**	SEC on CBS													
CBS	Winter	**Madeline**	Sabrina: The Animated Series	**Trollz**	**Horseland**	The Saturday Early Show				**Cake**	**Dance Revolution**	CBS Sports and/or local programming						CBS Sports programming						Local news	CBS Evening News
NBC	Fall	Local and/or syndicated programming		Today				**VeggieTales**	**Dragon**	**3-2-1 Penguins!**	**Babar**	**Jane and the Dragon**	**Jacob Two-Two**	NBC Sports and/or local programming				NBC Sports programming						Local news	NBC Nightly News
NBC	Spring	Local and/or syndicated programming		Today				Babar	**Dragon**	**3-2-1 Penguins!**	VeggieTales	**Jane and the Dragon**	**Jacob Two-Two**	NBC Sports and/or local programming				NBC Sports programming						Local news	NBC Nightly News
Fox	Fall	Local and/or syndicated programming		Winx Club	Bratz	Kirby: Right Back at Ya!	**Viva Piñata**	**Yu-Gi-Oh! Capsule Monsters**	**Chaotic**	Teenage Mutant Ninja Turtles	G.I. Joe: Sigma 6	Fox Sports and/or local programming													
Fox	December	Local and/or syndicated programming		Winx Club	Bratz	Kirby: Right Back at Ya!	Teenage Mutant Ninja Turtles	**Yu-Gi-Oh! Capsule Monsters**	**Viva Piñata**	Yu-Gi-Oh! GX	G.I. Joe: Sigma 6	Fox Sports and/or local programming													
Fox	January	Local and/or syndicated programming		Winx Club	Bratz	Kirby: Right Back at Ya!	**Viva Piñata**	Teenage Mutant Ninja Turtles	Yu-Gi-Oh! GX	Yu-Gi-Oh! GX	**Chaotic**	Fox Sports and/or local programming													
Fox	February	Local and/or syndicated programming		Winx Club	Bratz	Teenage Mutant Ninja Turtles	**Viva Piñata**	Teenage Mutant Ninja Turtles	Yu-Gi-Oh! GX	Yu-Gi-Oh! GX	**Chaotic**	Fox Sports and/or local programming													
Fox	Spring	Local and/or syndicated programming		Winx Club	**Viva Piñata**	Teenage Mutant Ninja Turtles	**Viva Piñata**	Teenage Mutant Ninja Turtles	**Chaotic**	Sonic X	Yu-Gi-Oh! GX	This Week in Baseball	Fox Sports and/or local programming												
Fox	June	Local and/or syndicated programming		Winx Club	**Viva Piñata**	**Viva Piñata**	Teenage Mutant Ninja Turtles	Teenage Mutant Ninja Turtles	**Chaotic**	Sonic X	Yu-Gi-Oh! GX	This Week in Baseball	Fox Sports and/or local programming												
Fox	July	Local and/or syndicated programming		Winx Club	Sonic X	**Viva Piñata**	Teenage Mutant Ninja Turtles	Teenage Mutant Ninja Turtles	**Chaotic**	**Di-Gata Defenders**	Yu-Gi-Oh! GX	This Week in Baseball	Fox Sports and/or local programming												
The CW	Fall	**Krypto the Superdog**	Krypto the Superdog	**Monster Allergy**	**Tom and Jerry Tales**	**Shaggy & Scooby-Doo Get a Clue!**	Johnny Test	**Legion of Super Heroes**	The Batman	Xiaolin Showdown	Loonatics Unleashed	Local and/or syndicated programming													
The CW	November	**Krypto the Superdog**	Krypto the Superdog	Loonatics Unleashed	**Tom and Jerry Tales**	**Shaggy & Scooby-Doo Get a Clue!**	Johnny Test	**Legion of Super Heroes**	The Batman	Xiaolin Showdown	Monster Allergy	Local and/or syndicated programming													
The CW	February	**Krypto the Superdog**	Krypto the Superdog	Loonatics Unleashed	**Tom and Jerry Tales**	**Shaggy & Scooby-Doo Get a Clue!**	Johnny Test	**Legion of Super Heroes**	The Batman	Spider Riders	Monster Allergy	Local and/or syndicated programming													
The CW	April	**Krypto the Superdog**	Krypto the Superdog	Loonatics Unleashed	**Tom and Jerry Tales**	**Shaggy & Scooby-Doo Get a Clue!**	Johnny Test	**Legion of Super Heroes**	The Batman	The Batman	Xiaolin Showdown	Local and/or syndicated programming													
The CW	Summer	**Krypto the Superdog**	Krypto the Superdog	Loonatics Unleashed	**Tom and Jerry Tales**	**Shaggy & Scooby-Doo Get a Clue!**	Johnny Test	**Legion of Super Heroes**	The Batman	Xiaolin Showdown	Johnny Test	Local and/or syndicated programming													

=== Sunday ===
Network		7:00 am	7:30 am	8:00 am	8:30 am	9:00 am	9:30 am	10:00 am	10:30 am	11:00 am	11:30 am	noon	12:30 pm	1:00 pm	1:30 pm	2:00 pm	2:30 pm	3:00 pm	3:30 pm	4:00 pm	4:30 pm	5:00 pm	5:30 pm	6:00 pm	6:30 pm
ABC	Fall	Local and/or syndicated programming		Good Morning America		Local and/or syndicated programming		This Week with George Stephanopoulos		NBA Access with Ahmad Rashad	ABC Sports and/or local programming													Local news	ABC World News Sunday
ABC	Winter	Local and/or syndicated programming		Good Morning America		Local and/or syndicated programming		This Week with George Stephanopoulos		ABC Sports and/or local programming														Local news	ABC World News Sunday
CBS	Fall	Local and/or syndicated programming				CBS News Sunday Morning			Face the Nation	Local and/or syndicated programming		NFL Today		NFL on CBS											
CBS	Mid-winter	Local and/or syndicated programming				CBS News Sunday Morning			Face the Nation	Local and/or syndicated programming		CBS Sports and/or local programming												Local news	CBS Evening News
NBC		Local and/or syndicated programming		Today		Meet the Press		Local and/or syndicated programming				NBC Sports and/or local programming												Local news	NBC Nightly News
Fox	Fall	Local and/or syndicated programming				Fox News Sunday		Local and/or syndicated programming				Fox NFL Sunday		Fox NFL (and sometimes local programming)											
Fox	Mid-winter	Local and/or syndicated programming				Fox News Sunday		Local and/or syndicated programming				Fox Sports and/or local programming												Local and/or syndicated programming	
The CW		Local and/or syndicated programming																				All of Us	Girlfriends	**The Game**	Everybody Hates Chris

== By network ==
=== ABC ===
Returning series:

- ABC World News Tonight with Charles Gibson
- All My Children
- General Hospital
- Good Morning America
- One Life to Live
- This Week with George Stephanopoulos
- The View
- ABC Kids
  - The Emperor's New School
  - Power Rangers Mystic Force
  - The Suite Life of Zack & Cody
  - That's So Raven
- ESPN on ABC (renamed from ABC Sports)
  - College Football on ABC
  - NBA Access with Ahmad Rashad

New series:

- ABC Kids
  - **Hannah Montana**
  - **Power Rangers Operation Overdrive**
  - **The Replacements**

Not returning from 2005–06:

- ABC Kids
  - The Buzz on Maggie
  - Kim Possible
  - Lilo & Stitch: The Series
  - NBA Inside Stuff
  - Phil of the Future
  - Power Rangers S.P.D.
  - The Proud Family

=== CBS ===
Returning series:

- As the World Turns
- The Bold and the Beautiful
- The Early Show
- CBS Evening News with Katie Couric
- CBS News Sunday Morning
- Face the Nation
- Guiding Light
- The Price Is Right
- The Saturday Early Show
- The Young and the Restless

New series:

- **KOL Secret Slumber Party**
  - **Cake**
  - **Dance Revolution**
  - **Horseland**
  - **Madeline**
  - **Sabrina: The Animated Series**
  - **Trollz**

Not returning from 2005–06:

- Nick Jr. on CBS (continues on Nickelodeon)
  - The Backyardigans
  - Blue's Clues
  - Dora the Explorer
  - Go, Diego, Go!
  - LazyTown
  - Little Bill

=== NBC ===
Returning series:

- Days of Our Lives
- Meet the Press
- NBC Nightly News with Brian Williams
- Passions
- Today with Matt Lauer and Meredith Vieira

New series:

- **Qubo** (shared with Ion Television and Telemundo)
  - **3-2-1 Penguins!**
  - **Babar**
  - **Dragon**
  - **Jacob Two-Two**
  - **Jane and the Dragon**
  - **VeggieTales**

Not returning from 2005–06:

- Discovery Kids on NBC (continues on Discovery Kids)
  - Darcy's Wild Life
  - Endurance
  - Flight 29 Down
  - Kenny the Shark
  - Time Warp Trio
  - Trading Spaces: Boys vs. Girls
  - Tutenstein

=== Fox ===
Returning series:

- 4Kids TV
  - Bratz
  - G.I. Joe: Sigma 6
  - Kirby: Right Back at Ya!
  - Sonic X
  - Teenage Mutant Ninja Turtles
  - Winx Club
  - Yu-Gi-Oh! GX
- Fox News Sunday
- Fox Sports
  - Fox NFL
  - Fox NFL Sunday
  - This Week in Baseball

New series:

- 4Kids TV
  - **Chaotic**
  - **Di-Gata Defenders**
  - **Viva Piñata**
  - **Yu-Gi-Oh! Capsule Monsters**

Not returning from 2005–06:

- 4Kids TV
  - The Cramp Twins
  - Magical DoReMi
  - Mew Mew Power
  - One Piece
  - Ultimate Muscle: The Kinnikuman Legacy
- Fox Sports
  - NFL Under the Helmet

=== The CW ===
Returning series:

- All of Us (reruns)
- Everybody Hates Chris (reruns)
- Girlfriends (reruns)
- Reba (reruns)
- What I Like About You (reruns)
- Kids WB! (The WB)
  - The Batman
  - Johnny Test
  - Loonatics Unleashed
  - Spider Riders
  - Xiaolin Showdown

New series:

- **The Game** (reruns)
- Kids WB!
  - **Krypto the Superdog**
  - **Legion of Super Heroes**
  - **Monster Allergy**
  - **Shaggy & Scooby-Doo Get a Clue!**
  - **Tom and Jerry Tales**

Not returning from 2005–06:

- Kids WB! (The WB)
  - Coconut Fred's Fruit Salad Island
  - MegaMan: NT Warrior
  - Pokémon (moved to Cartoon Network)
  - Transformers: Cybertron
  - Viewtiful Joe
  - Yu-Gi-Oh!
- 8 Simple Rules (reruns)
- Charmed (reruns)
- ER (reruns)
- Pepper Dennis (reruns)
- Smallville (reruns)
- Supernatural (reruns)
- Twins (reruns)

== Renewals and Cancellations ==
=== Cancellations ===
==== NBC ====
- Passions - It was announced that the show would move to The 101 Network on September 10, 2007.

== See also ==
- 2006–07 United States network television schedule (prime-time)
- 2006–07 United States network television schedule (late night)
