= 2004–05 United States network television schedule (daytime) =

The following is the 2004–05 daytime network television schedule for the five major English-language commercial broadcast networks in the United States in operation during that television season. It covers the weekday daytime hours from September 2004 to August 2005. The schedule is followed by a list per network of returning series, new series, and series canceled after the 2003–04 season.

Affiliates fill time periods not occupied by network programs with local or syndicated programming. PBS – which offers daytime programming through a children's program block, PBS Kids – is not included, as its member television stations have local flexibility over most of their schedules and broadcast times for network shows may vary. Also not included are UPN (as the network did not offer any daytime programs this season), and PAX, as its schedule is composed mainly of syndicated reruns although it also carried some first-run programs.

Nielsen Media Research reported that the three major networks – CBS, ABC, and NBC – had lost daytime soap opera viewers during the 2004–05 season, as audiences turned to cable channels and daytime talk shows instead.

== Legend ==
- Light yellow indicates talk shows.
- Green indicates soap operas.
- Pink indicates game shows.
- Gold indicates news programming.
- White indicates local programming.
- Gray indicates encore programming (e.g., reruns of prime-time programming).
- Light teal indicates sporting events.
- Light purple indicates children's programming.
- New series are highlighted in **bold**.

== Schedule ==
- All times correspond to U.S. Eastern and Pacific Time scheduling (except for some live sports or events). Except where affiliates slot certain programs outside their network-dictated timeslots, subtract one hour for Central, Mountain, Alaska, and Hawaii-Aleutian times.
- Local schedules may differ, as affiliates have the option to pre-empt or delay network programs. Such scheduling may be limited to preemptions caused by local or national breaking news or weather coverage (which may force stations to tape delay certain programs in overnight timeslots or defer them to a co-operated or other contracted station in their regular timeslot) and any major sports events scheduled to air in a weekday timeslot (mainly during major holidays). Stations may air shows at other times at their preference.

=== Monday-Friday ===
Network		7:00 am	7:30 am	8:00 am	8:30 am	9:00 am	9:30 am	10:00 am	10:30 am	11:00 am	11:30 am	noon	12:30 pm	1:00 pm	1:30 pm	2:00 pm	2:30 pm	3:00 pm	3:30 pm	4:00 pm	4:30 pm	5:00 pm	5:30 pm	6:00 pm	6:30 pm
ABC		Good Morning America				Local and/or syndicated programming				The View		Local and/or syndicated programming		All My Children		One Life to Live		General Hospital		Local and/or syndicated programming					ABC World News with Peter Jennings
CBS		The Early Show				Local and/or syndicated programming				The Price is Right		Local and/or syndicated programming	The Young and the Restless		The Bold and the Beautiful	As the World Turns		Guiding Light		Local and/or syndicated programming					CBS Evening News with Dan Rather
NBC		Today						Local and/or syndicated programming						Days of Our Lives		Passions		Local and/or syndicated programming							NBC Nightly News with Brian Williams
The WB	Fall	Local and/or syndicated programming																		Jackie Chan Adventures / **Da Boom Crew** (Fri.) / MegaMan NT Warrior (October)	¡Mucha Lucha! Gigante	Pokémon	Yu-Gi-Oh! / The Batman (Fri)	Local and/or syndicated programming	
The WB	late October	Local and/or syndicated programming																		Pokémon / MegaMan NT Warrior (Mon-Thu starting Nov. 22)	Pokémon	Yu-Gi-Oh!	Yu-Gi-Oh!	Local and/or syndicated programming	
The WB	December	Local and/or syndicated programming																		Pokémon	¡Mucha Lucha! Gigante	Yu-Gi-Oh!	Yu-Gi-Oh!	Local and/or syndicated programming	
The WB	March	Local and/or syndicated programming																		MegaMan: NT Warrior / What's New Scooby-Doo? (Fri. until Apr. 15)	¡Mucha Lucha! Gigante	Pokémon	Yu-Gi-Oh!	Local and/or syndicated programming	
The WB	April	Local and/or syndicated programming																		MegaMan: NT Warrior / What's New Scooby-Doo? (Fri. until Apr. 15)	Pokémon	Xiaolin Showdown	Yu-Gi-Oh!	Local and/or syndicated programming	
The WB	Summer	Local and/or syndicated programming																		Pokémon	Jackie Chan Adventures	Xiaolin Showdown	Xiaolin Showdown	Local and/or syndicated programming	

=== Saturday ===
Network		7:00 am	7:30 am	8:00 am	8:30 am	9:00 am	9:30 am	10:00 am	10:30 am	11:00 am	11:30 am	noon	12:30 pm	1:00 pm	1:30 pm	2:00 pm	2:30 pm	3:00 pm	3:30 pm	4:00 pm	4:30 pm	5:00 pm	5:30 pm	6:00 pm	6:30 pm
ABC	Fall	Local and/or syndicated programming		**Good Morning America**		Lilo & Stitch: The Series	Fillmore!	The Proud Family	That's So Raven	**Phil of the Future**	Lizzie McGuire	Kim Possible	Power Rangers Dino Thunder	College Football on ABC											
ABC	Winter	Local and/or syndicated programming		**Good Morning America**		Lilo & Stitch: The Series	Fillmore!	The Proud Family	That's So Raven	**Phil of the Future**	Lizzie McGuire	**W.I.T.C.H.**	Power Rangers Dino Thunder	ABC Sports and/or local programming				ABC Sports programming						Local news	ABC World News Saturday
ABC	Spring	Local and/or syndicated programming		**Good Morning America**		Lilo & Stitch: The Series	The Proud Family	Even Stevens	That's So Raven	**Phil of the Future**	Lizzie McGuire	Kim Possible	**Power Rangers S.P.D.**	NBA Inside Stuff	ABC Sports and/or local programming			ABC Sports programming						Local news	ABC World News Saturday
CBS	Fall	**LazyTown**	**Miss Spider's Sunny Patch Friends**	Dora the Explorer	Dora the Explorer	The Saturday Early Show				Little Bill	Blue's Clues	SEC on CBS													
CBS	October	**LazyTown**	**Miss Spider's Sunny Patch Friends**	**The Backyardigans**	Dora the Explorer	The Saturday Early Show				Little Bill	Blue's Clues	SEC on CBS													
CBS	Winter	**LazyTown**	**Miss Spider's Sunny Patch Friends**	**The Backyardigans**	Dora the Explorer	The Saturday Early Show				Little Bill	Blue's Clues	CBS Sports and/or local programming						CBS Sports programming						Local news	CBS Evening News
NBC	Fall	Local and/or syndicated programming		Today				Kenny the Shark	Tutenstein	Trading Spaces: Boys vs. Girls	Endurance	Strange Days at Blake Holsey High	**Darcy's Wild Life**	NBC Sports and/or local programming				NBC Sports programming						Local news	NBC Nightly News
NBC	Spring	Local and/or syndicated programming		Today				Croc Files	Jeff Corwin Unleashed	Scout's Safari	Trading Spaces: Boys vs. Girls	Darcy's Wild Life	Endurance	NBC Sports and/or local programming				NBC Sports programming						Local news	NBC Nightly News
NBC	Summer	Local and/or syndicated programming		Today				Tutenstein	**Time Warp Trio**	Trading Spaces: Boys vs. Girls	Jeff Corwin Unleashed	Darcy's Wild Life	Endurance	NBC Sports and/or local programming				NBC Sports programming						Local news	NBC Nightly News
Fox	Fall	Local and/or syndicated programming		The Cramp Twins	Winx Club	Sonic X	**One Piece**	Teenage Mutant Ninja Turtles	**F-Zero: GP Legend**	Kirby: Right Back at Ya!	Shaman King	NFL Under the Helmet	Fox Sports and/or local programming												
Fox	February	Local and/or syndicated programming		**Mew Mew Power**	Winx Club	Sonic X	**One Piece**	Teenage Mutant Ninja Turtles	**F-Zero: GP Legend**	Winx Club	Shaman King	Fox Sports and/or local programming													
Fox	Spring	Local and/or syndicated programming		**Mew Mew Power**	Winx Club	Winx Club	Sonic X	Sonic X	Teenage Mutant Ninja Turtles	**One Piece**	Shaman King	Local and/or syndicated programming	This Week in Baseball	Fox Sports and/or local programming											
Fox	May	Local and/or syndicated programming		**Mew Mew Power**	Winx Club	Winx Club	Sonic X	Sonic X	Teenage Mutant Ninja Turtles	**One Piece**	**Alien Racers** / Kirby: Right Back at Ya! (Late May)	Local and/or syndicated programming	This Week in Baseball	Fox Sports and/or local programming											
Fox	Summer	Local and/or syndicated programming		**Mew Mew Power**	Winx Club	Sonic X	**Alien Racers** / Kirby: Right Back at Ya! (Late July)	Teenage Mutant Ninja Turtles	**One Piece**	Shaman King	The Menu	Local and/or syndicated programming	This Week in Baseball	Fox Sports and/or local programming											
The WB	Fall	Local and/or syndicated programming		Jackie Chan Adventures	¡Mucha Lucha! Gigante / Jackie Chan Adventures (June)	Teen Titans	Xiaolin Showdown	Pokémon	**The Batman**	Yu-Gi-Oh!	**Da Boom Crew**	Local and/or syndicated programming													
The WB	October	Local and/or syndicated programming		Yu-Gi-Oh!	¡Mucha Lucha! Gigante / Jackie Chan Adventures (June)	Teen Titans	Xiaolin Showdown	Pokémon	**The Batman**	Yu-Gi-Oh!	Pokémon	Local and/or syndicated programming													
The WB	November	Local and/or syndicated programming		Pokémon	¡Mucha Lucha! Gigante / Jackie Chan Adventures (June)	Teen Titans	Xiaolin Showdown	Pokémon	**The Batman**	Yu-Gi-Oh!	Yu-Gi-Oh!	Local and/or syndicated programming													
The WB	February	Local and/or syndicated programming		What's New Scooby-Doo?	¡Mucha Lucha! Gigante / Jackie Chan Adventures (June)	Teen Titans	Xiaolin Showdown	Pokémon	**The Batman**	Yu-Gi-Oh!	Yu-Gi-Oh!	Local and/or syndicated programming													
The WB	April	Local and/or syndicated programming		¡Mucha Lucha! Gigante / Jackie Chan Adventures (June)	¡Mucha Lucha! Gigante / Jackie Chan Adventures (June)	Xiaolin Showdown	Xiaolin Showdown	Pokémon	**The Batman**	Yu-Gi-Oh!	Yu-Gi-Oh!	Local and/or syndicated programming													
The WB	Summer	Local and/or syndicated programming		Teen Titans / The Batman (Aug. 13) / Yu-Gi-Oh! (Aug. 27)	The Batman	Xiaolin Showdown	Xiaolin Showdown	**Foster's Home for Imaginary Friends** / Pokémon (Aug. 20)	MegaMan NT Warrior	Yu-Gi-Oh!	MegaMan NT Warrior	Local and/or syndicated programming													

=== Sunday ===
Network		7:00 am	7:30 am	8:00 am	8:30 am	9:00 am	9:30 am	10:00 am	10:30 am	11:00 am	11:30 am	noon	12:30 pm	1:00 pm	1:30 pm	2:00 pm	2:30 pm	3:00 pm	3:30 pm	4:00 pm	4:30 pm	5:00 pm	5:30 pm	6:00 pm	6:30 pm
ABC		Local and/or syndicated programming		**Good Morning America**		Local and/or syndicated programming		This Week with George Stephanopoulos		NBA Inside Stuff	ABC Sports and/or local programming													Local news	ABC World News Sunday
CBS	Fall	Local and/or syndicated programming				CBS News Sunday Morning			Face the Nation	Local and/or syndicated programming		NFL Today		NFL on CBS											
CBS	Mid-winter	Local and/or syndicated programming				CBS News Sunday Morning			Face the Nation	Local and/or syndicated programming		CBS Sports and/or local programming												Local news	CBS Evening News
NBC		Local and/or syndicated programming		Today		Meet the Press		Local and/or syndicated programming				NBC Sports and/or local programming												Local news	NBC Nightly News
Fox	Fall	Local and/or syndicated programming				Fox News Sunday		Local and/or syndicated programming				Fox NFL Sunday		Fox NFL (and sometimes another Fox Sports event and/or local programming)											
Fox	Mid-winter	Local and/or syndicated programming				Fox News Sunday		Local and/or syndicated programming				Fox Sports and/or local programming												Local and/or syndicated programming	

== By network ==
=== ABC ===
Returning series:

- ABC World News Tonight with Peter Jennings
- All My Children
- General Hospital
- Good Morning America
- One Life to Live
- This Week with George Stephanopoulos
- The View
- ABC Kids
  - Even Stevens
  - Fillmore!
  - Kim Possible
  - Lilo & Stitch: The Series
  - Lizzie McGuire
  - NBA Inside Stuff
  - Power Rangers Dino Thunder
  - The Proud Family
  - That's So Raven

New series:

- ABC Kids
  - **Phil of the Future**
  - **Power Rangers S.P.D.**
  - **W.I.T.C.H.**

Not returning from 2003–04:

- ABC Kids
  - Power Rangers Ninja Storm
  - Recess

=== CBS ===
Returning series:

- As the World Turns
- The Bold and the Beautiful
- The Early Show
- CBS Evening News with Dan Rather
- CBS News Sunday Morning
- Face the Nation
- Guiding Light
- The Price is Right
- The Saturday Early Show
- The Young and the Restless
- Nick Jr. on CBS
  - Blue's Clues
  - Dora the Explorer
  - Little Bill

New series:

- Nick Jr. on CBS
  - **The Backyardigans**
  - **LazyTown**
  - **Miss Spider's Sunny Patch Friends**

Not returning from 2003–04:

- Nick on CBS (continues on Nickelodeon)
  - All Grown Up!
  - The Brothers Garcia
  - ChalkZone
  - Hey Arnold!
  - The Wild Thornberrys

=== NBC ===
Returning series:

- Days of Our Lives
- Meet the Press
- NBC Nightly News with Tom Brokaw/Brian Williams
- Passions
- Today
- Discovery Kids on NBC
  - Croc Files
  - Endurance
  - Jeff Corwin Unleashed
  - Kenny the Shark
  - Scout's Safari
  - Strange Days at Blake Holsey High
  - Trading Spaces: Boys vs. Girls
  - Tutenstein

New series:

- Discovery Kids on NBC
  - **Darcy's Wild Life**
  - **Time Warp Trio**

Not returning from 2003–04:

- Discovery Kids on NBC
  - Skunked TV

=== Fox ===
Returning series:

- Fox Box (later renamed as 4Kids TV)
  - The Cramp Twins
  - Kirby: Right Back at Ya!
  - Shaman King
  - Sonic X
  - Teenage Mutant Ninja Turtles
  - Winx Club
- Fox News Sunday
- Fox Sports
  - The Menu
  - NFL Under the Helmet
  - This Week in Baseball

New series:

- Fox Box (later renamed as 4Kids TV)
  - **Alien Racers**
  - **F-Zero: GP Legend**
  - **Mew Mew Power**
  - **One Piece**

Not returning from 2003–04:

- Fox Box (later renamed as 4Kids TV)
  - Cubix
  - Funky Cops
  - Martin Mystery
  - Ultimate Muscle: The Kinnikuman Legacy

=== The WB ===
Returning series:

- Kids WB!
  - Jackie Chan Adventures
  - MegaMan: NT Warrior
  - ¡Mucha Lucha! Gigante
  - Pokémon: Advanced Challenge
  - Teen Titans
  - Xiaolin Showdown
  - What's New Scooby-Doo?
  - Yu-Gi-Oh!

New series:

- Kids WB!
  - **The Batman**
  - **Da Boom Crew**
  - **Foster's Home for Imaginary Friends**

Not returning from 2003–04:

- Kids WB!
  - Astro Boy
  - Codename: Kids Next Door (continues on Cartoon Network)
  - Ozzy & Drix
  - Scooby-Doo
  - Static Shock
  - X-Men: Evolution

== See also ==
- 2004–05 United States network television schedule (prime-time)
- 2004–05 United States network television schedule (late night)
