= 2005–06 United States network television schedule (daytime) =

The following is the 2005–06 daytime network television schedule for the five major English-language commercial broadcast networks in the United States in operation during that television season. It covers the weekday daytime hours from September 2005 to August 2006. The schedule is followed by a list per network of returning series, new series, and series canceled after the 2004–05 season.

Affiliates fill time periods not occupied by network programs with local or syndicated programming. PBS – which offers daytime programming through a children's program block, PBS Kids – is not included, as its member television stations have local flexibility over most of their schedules and broadcast times for network shows may vary. Also not included are UPN (as the network did not offer any daytime programs this season), and i: Independent Television, as its schedule was composed mainly of syndicated reruns although it also carried some first-run programs.

There were nine daytime soap operas across all networks during the 2005–2006 season. Of the three major networks, NBC had the most limited presence, with only two (Days of Our Lives and Passions).

== Legend ==
- Light yellow indicates talk shows.
- Green indicates soap operas.
- Pink indicates game shows.
- Gold indicates news programming.
- White indicates local programming.
- Gray indicates encore programming (e.g., reruns of prime-time programming).
- Light teal indicates sporting events.
- Light purple indicates children's programming.
- New series are highlighted in **bold**.

== Schedule ==
- All times correspond to U.S. Eastern and Pacific Time scheduling (except for some live sports or events). Except where affiliates slot certain programs outside their network-dictated timeslots, subtract one hour for Central, Mountain, Alaska, and Hawaii-Aleutian times.
- Local schedules may differ, as affiliates have the option to pre-empt or delay network programs. Such scheduling may be limited to preemptions caused by local or national breaking news or weather coverage (which may force stations to tape delay certain programs in overnight timeslots or defer them to a co-operated or other contracted station in their regular timeslot) and any major sports events scheduled to air in a weekday timeslot (mainly during major holidays). Stations may air shows at other times at their preference.

=== Monday-Friday ===
Network		7:00 am	7:30 am	8:00 am	8:30 am	9:00 am	9:30 am	10:00 am	10:30 am	11:00 am	11:30 am	noon	12:30 pm	1:00 pm	1:30 pm	2:00 pm	2:30 pm	3:00 pm	3:30 pm	4:00 pm	4:30 pm	5:00 pm	5:30 pm	6:00 pm	6:30 pm
ABC		Good Morning America				Local and/or syndicated programming				The View		Local and/or syndicated programming		All My Children		One Life to Live		General Hospital		Local and/or syndicated programming					ABC World News Tonight with Charles Gibson
CBS		The Early Show				Local and/or syndicated programming				The Price is Right		Local and/or syndicated programming	The Young and the Restless		The Bold and the Beautiful	As the World Turns		Guiding Light		Local and/or syndicated programming					CBS Evening News with Bob Schieffer
NBC		Today						Local and/or syndicated programming						Days of Our Lives		Passions		Local and/or syndicated programming							NBC Nightly News with Brian Williams
The WB	Fall	Local and/or syndicated programming																		Pokémon	The Batman / MegaMan NT Warrior (Nov. 28-Dec. 9)	Xiaolin Showdown	**Transformers: Cybertron**	Local and/or syndicated programming	
The WB	December	Local and/or syndicated programming																		Pokémon	Two episodes of a Kids' WB show		**Transformers: Cybertron**	Local and/or syndicated programming	
The WB	January	Local and/or syndicated programming																		ER (R)		8 Simple Rules (R)	8 Simple Rules (R)	Local and/or syndicated programming	
The WB	Summer	Local and/or syndicated programming																		What I Like About You (R)	What I Like About You (R)	8 Simple Rules (R)	8 Simple Rules (R)	Local and/or syndicated programming	

- Notes:
- Kids' WB ran temporary stunt blocks of animated series in the 4:30 and 5:00 p.m. ET time slots during December 2005, including:
  - Xiaolin Showdown (December 12,22,27)
  - Johnny Test (December 13,21,26)
  - Coconut Fred's Fruit Salad Island (December 14,19,29)
  - The Batman (December 15,20)
  - Viewtiful Joe (Aired for 90 minutes from 4:00 to 5:30 on December 16 then, for one hour from 4:30 to 5:30 on December 28)
  - Loonatics Unleashed (December 23,30)
- On January 2, 2006, Daytime WB debuted as Kids WB! had been reduced only to Saturdays.

=== Saturday ===
Network		7:00 am	7:30 am	8:00 am	8:30 am	9:00 am	9:30 am	10:00 am	10:30 am	11:00 am	11:30 am	noon	12:30 pm	1:00 pm	1:30 pm	2:00 pm	2:30 pm	3:00 pm	3:30 pm	4:00 pm	4:30 pm	5:00 pm	5:30 pm	6:00 pm	6:30 pm
ABC	Fall	Local and/or syndicated programming		Good Morning America		Lilo & Stitch: The Series	**The Buzz on Maggie**	The Proud Family	That's So Raven	**The Suite Life of Zack and Cody**	Phil of the Future	Kim Possible	Power Rangers S.P.D.	College Football on ABC											
ABC	Winter	Local and/or syndicated programming		Good Morning America		Lilo & Stitch: The Series	**The Emperor's New School**	The Proud Family	That's So Raven	**The Suite Life of Zack and Cody**	Phil of the Future	Kim Possible	Power Rangers S.P.D.	**NBA Access with Ahmad Rashad**	ABC Sports and/or local programming			ABC Sports programming						Local news	ABC World News Saturday
ABC	Spring	Local and/or syndicated programming		Good Morning America		Lilo & Stitch: The Series	**The Emperor's New School**	The Proud Family	That's So Raven	**The Suite Life of Zack and Cody**	Phil of the Future	Kim Possible	**Power Rangers Mystic Force**	**NBA Access with Ahmad Rashad**	ABC Sports and/or local programming			ABC Sports programming						Local news	ABC World News Saturday
CBS	Fall	LazyTown	**Go, Diego, Go!**	The Backyardigans	Dora the Explorer	The Saturday Early Show				Little Bill	Blue's Clues	SEC on CBS													
CBS	Winter	LazyTown	**Go, Diego, Go!**	The Backyardigans	Dora the Explorer	The Saturday Early Show				Little Bill	Blue's Clues	CBS Sports and/or local programming						CBS Sports programming						Local news	CBS Evening News
NBC	Fall	Local and/or syndicated programming		Today				Tutenstein	Time Warp Trio	Trading Spaces: Boys vs. Girls	Darcy's Wild Life	**Flight 29 Down**	Endurance	NBC Sports and/or local programming				NBC Sports programming						Local news	NBC Nightly News
NBC	Spring	Local and/or syndicated programming		Today				Kenny the Shark	Time Warp Trio	Trading Spaces: Boys vs. Girls	Darcy's Wild Life	**Flight 29 Down**	Endurance	NBC Sports and/or local programming				NBC Sports programming						Local news	NBC Nightly News
Fox	Fall	Local and/or syndicated programming		**Magical DoReMi**	Mew Mew Power	**Bratz**	Winx Club	Sonic X	Teenage Mutant Ninja Turtles	**G.I. Joe: Sigma 6**	One Piece	NFL Under the Helmet	Fox Sports and/or local programming												
Fox	November	Local and/or syndicated programming		**Magical DoReMi**	Winx Club	**Bratz**	Winx Club	**Bratz**	Teenage Mutant Ninja Turtles	Sonic X	**G.I. Joe: Sigma 6**	NFL Under the Helmet	Fox Sports and/or local programming												
Fox	Winter	Local and/or syndicated programming		**Magical DoReMi**	**Magical DoReMi**	**Bratz**	Winx Club	Winx Club	Teenage Mutant Ninja Turtles	Sonic X	**G.I. Joe: Sigma 6**	Local and/or syndicated programming	Fox Sports and/or local programming												
Fox	Summer	Local and/or syndicated programming		**Magical DoReMi**	Kirby: Right Back at Ya!	**Bratz**	Winx Club	Teenage Mutant Ninja Turtles	Kirby: Right Back at Ya!	Ultimate Muscle: The Kinnikuman Legacy	The Cramp Twins	Local and/or syndicated programming	This Week in Baseball	Fox Sports and/or local programming											
The WB	Fall	Local and/or syndicated programming		Yu-Gi-Oh!	The Batman	Xiaolin Showdown	**Coconut Fred's Fruit Salad Island**	Pokémon: Advanced Battle	**Loonatics Unleashed**	**Johnny Test**	Yu-Gi-Oh!	Local and/or syndicated programming													
The WB	November	Local and/or syndicated programming		Yu-Gi-Oh!	The Batman	Xiaolin Showdown	**Coconut Fred's Fruit Salad Island**	Pokémon: Advanced Battle	**Loonatics Unleashed**	**Johnny Test**	**Viewtiful Joe**	Local and/or syndicated programming													
The WB	December	Local and/or syndicated programming		Viewtiful Joe	The Batman	Xiaolin Showdown	Loonatics Unleashed	Pokémon: Advanced Battle	Coconut Fred's Fruit Salad Island	**Johnny Test**	Yu-Gi-Oh!	Local and/or syndicated programming													
The WB	Winter	Pillow Head Hour (two episodes of a Kids' WB show); Xiaolin Showdown (March)		Viewtiful Joe	The Batman	Xiaolin Showdown	Loonatics Unleashed	Pokémon: Advanced Battle	Pokémon	**Johnny Test**	Johnny Test (Feb. 11-Mar. 11)	Local and/or syndicated programming													
The WB	April	Loonatics Unleashed Xiaolin Showdown (Jun. 3–10) Coconut Fred's Fruit Salad Island (Jun. 17-Jul. 1)		Viewtiful Joe	The Batman	Xiaolin Showdown	Xiaolin Showdown	Pokémon: Advanced Battle	Pokémon	**Johnny Test**	Yu-Gi-Oh!	Local and/or syndicated programming													
The WB	May	Loonatics Unleashed Xiaolin Showdown (Jun. 3–10) Coconut Fred's Fruit Salad Island (Jun. 17-Jul. 1)		Viewtiful Joe	The Batman	Xiaolin Showdown	Loonatics Unleashed	Pokémon: Advanced Battle	Coconut Fred's Fruit Salad Island	**Johnny Test**	Yu-Gi-Oh!	Local and/or syndicated programming													
The WB	Summer	Yu-Gi-Oh!	Yu-Gi-Oh!	Johnny Test	Xiaolin Showdown	Xiaolin Showdown	Loonatics Unleashed	Pokémon: Advanced Battle	**Spider Riders**	The Batman	Viewtiful Joe	Local and/or syndicated programming													

=== Sunday ===
Network		7:00 am	7:30 am	8:00 am	8:30 am	9:00 am	9:30 am	10:00 am	10:30 am	11:00 am	11:30 am	noon	12:30 pm	1:00 pm	1:30 pm	2:00 pm	2:30 pm	3:00 pm	3:30 pm	4:00 pm	4:30 pm	5:00 pm	5:30 pm	6:00 pm	6:30 pm
ABC	Fall	Local and/or syndicated programming		Good Morning America		Local and/or syndicated programming		This Week with George Stephanopoulos		NBA Inside Stuff	ABC Sports and/or local programming													Local news	ABC World News Sunday
ABC	Winter	Local and/or syndicated programming		Good Morning America		Local and/or syndicated programming		This Week with George Stephanopoulos		**NBA Access with Ahmad Rashad**	ABC Sports and/or local programming													Local news	ABC World News Sunday
CBS	Fall	Local and/or syndicated programming				CBS News Sunday Morning			Face the Nation	Local and/or syndicated programming		NFL Today		NFL on CBS											
CBS	Mid-winter	Local and/or syndicated programming				CBS News Sunday Morning			Face the Nation	Local and/or syndicated programming		CBS Sports and/or local programming												Local news	CBS Evening News
NBC		Local and/or syndicated programming		Today		Meet the Press		Local and/or syndicated programming				NBC Sports and/or local programming												Local news	NBC Nightly News
Fox	Fall	Local and/or syndicated programming				Fox News Sunday		Local and/or syndicated programming				Fox NFL Sunday		Fox NFL (and sometimes local programming)											
Fox	Mid-winter	Local and/or syndicated programming				Fox News Sunday		Local and/or syndicated programming				Fox Sports and/or local programming												Local and/or syndicated programming	
The WB	Fall	Local and/or syndicated programming																				**Supernatural**		What I Like About You	**Twins**
The WB	November	Local and/or syndicated programming																				Charmed		What I Like About You	**Twins**
The WB	May	Local and/or syndicated programming																				Smallville		What I Like About You	**Twins**
The WB	Summer	Local and/or syndicated programming																				**Pepper Dennis**		What I Like About You	**Twins**

== By network ==
=== ABC ===
Returning series:

- ABC World News Tonight with Peter Jennings
- All My Children
- General Hospital
- Good Morning America
- One Life to Live
- This Week with George Stephanopoulos
- The View
- ABC Kids
  - Kim Possible
  - Lilo & Stitch: The Series
  - NBA Inside Stuff
  - Phil of the Future
  - Power Rangers S.P.D.
  - The Proud Family
  - That's So Raven

New series:

- ABC Kids
  - **The Buzz on Maggie**
  - **The Emperor's New School**
  - **NBA Access with Ahmad Rashad**
  - **Power Rangers Mystic Force**
  - **The Suite Life of Zack and Cody**

Not returning from 2004–05:

- ABC Kids
  - Even Stevens
  - Fillmore!
  - Lizzie McGuire
  - Power Rangers Dino Thunder
  - W.I.T.C.H.

=== CBS ===
Returning series:

- As the World Turns
- The Bold and the Beautiful
- The Early Show
- CBS Evening News with Dan Rather
- CBS News Sunday Morning
- Face the Nation
- Guiding Light
- The Price is Right
- The Saturday Early Show
- The Young and the Restless
- Nick Jr. on CBS
  - The Backyardigans
  - Blue's Clues
  - Dora the Explorer
  - LazyTown
  - Little Bill

New series:

- Nick Jr. on CBS
  - **Go, Diego, Go!**

Not returning from 2004–05:

- Nick Jr. on CBS
  - Miss Spider's Sunny Patch Friends

=== NBC ===
Returning series:

- Days of Our Lives
- Meet the Press
- NBC Nightly News with Tom Brokaw
- Passions
- Today
- Discovery Kids on NBC
  - Darcy's Wild Life
  - Endurance
  - Kenny the Shark
  - Time Warp Trio
  - Trading Spaces: Boys vs. Girls
  - Tutenstein

New series:

- Discovery Kids on NBC
  - **Flight 29 Down**

Not returning from 2004–05:

- Discovery Kids on NBC
  - Croc Files
  - Jeff Corwin Unleashed
  - Scout's Safari
  - Strange Days at Blake Holsey High

=== Fox ===
Returning series:

- 4Kids TV
  - The Cramp Twins
  - Kirby: Right Back at Ya!
  - Mew Mew Power
  - One Piece
  - Sonic X
  - Teenage Mutant Ninja Turtles
  - Ultimate Muscle: The Kinnikuman Legacy
  - Winx Club
- Fox News Sunday
- Fox Sports
  - NFL Under the Helmet
  - This Week in Baseball

New series:

- 4Kids TV
  - **Magical DoReMi**
  - **Bratz**
  - **G.I. Joe: Sigma 6**

Not returning from 2004–05:

- Fox Box
  - Alien Racers
  - F-Zero: GP Legend
  - Shaman King
- Fox Sports
  - The Menu

=== The WB ===
Returning series:

- Kids WB!
  - The Batman
  - MegaMan: NT Warrior
  - Pokémon: Advanced Battle
  - Xiaolin Showdown
  - Yu-Gi-Oh!

New series:

- 8 Simple Rules (reruns)
- Charmed (reruns)
- ER (reruns)
- **Pepper Dennis** (reruns)
- Smallville (reruns)
- **Supernatural** (reruns)
- **Twins** (reruns)
- What I Like About You (reruns)
- Kids WB!
  - **Coconut Fred's Fruit Salad Island**
  - **Johnny Test**
  - **Loonatics Unleashed**
  - **Spider Riders**
  - **Transformers: Cybertron**
  - **Viewtiful Joe**

Not returning from 2004–05:

- Kids WB!
  - Da Boom Crew
  - Foster's Home for Imaginary Friends
  - Jackie Chan Adventures
  - ¡Mucha Lucha! Gigante
  - Teen Titans
  - What's New Scooby-Doo?

== See also ==
- 2005–06 United States network television schedule (prime-time)
- 2005–06 United States network television schedule (late night)
