= 2002–03 United States network television schedule (daytime) =

The following is the 2002–03 daytime network television schedule for the six major English-language commercial broadcast networks in the United States in operation during that television season. It covers the weekday daytime hours from September 2002 to August 2003. The schedule is followed by a list per network of returning series, new series, and series canceled after the 2001–02 season.

Affiliates fill time periods not occupied by network programs with local or syndicated programming. PBS – which offers daytime programming through a children's program block, PBS Kids – is not included, as its member television stations have local flexibility over most of their schedules and broadcast times for network shows may vary. Also not included are stations affiliated with Pax TV, as its schedule is composed mainly of syndicated reruns although it also carried some first-run programs.

ABC announced that the long-running soap opera All My Children would show American daytime television's first same-sex kiss on April 23, 2003.

== Legend ==
- Light yellow indicates talk shows.
- Green indicates soap operas.
- Pink indicates game shows.
- Gold indicates news programming.
- White indicates local programming.
- Gray indicates encore programming (e.g., reruns of prime-time programming).
- Light teal indicates sporting events.
- Light purple indicates children's programming.
- New series are highlighted in **bold**.

== Schedule ==
- All times correspond to U.S. Eastern and Pacific Time scheduling (except for some live sports or events). Except where affiliates slot certain programs outside their network-dictated timeslots, subtract one hour for Central, Mountain, Alaska, and Hawaii-Aleutian times.
- Local schedules may differ, as affiliates have the option to pre-empt or delay network programs. Such scheduling may be limited to preemptions caused by local or national breaking news or weather coverage (which may force stations to tape delay certain programs in overnight timeslots or defer them to a co-operated or other contracted station in their regular timeslot) and any major sports events scheduled to air in a weekday timeslot (mainly during major holidays). Stations may air shows at other times at their preference.

=== Monday-Friday ===
Network	7:00 am	7:30 am	8:00 am	8:30 am	9:00 am	9:30 am	10:00 am	10:30 am	11:00 am	11:30 am	noon	12:30 pm	1:00 pm	1:30 pm	2:00 pm	2:30 pm	3:00 pm	3:30 pm	4:00 pm	4:30 pm	5:00 pm	5:30 pm	6:00 pm	6:30 pm
ABC	Good Morning America				Local and/or syndicated programming				The View		Local and/or syndicated programming	Port Charles	All My Children		One Life to Live		General Hospital		Local and/or syndicated programming					ABC World News Tonight with Peter Jennings
CBS	The Early Show				Local and/or syndicated programming				The Price is Right		Local and/or syndicated programming	The Young and the Restless		The Bold and the Beautiful	As the World Turns		Guiding Light		Local and/or syndicated programming					CBS Evening News with Dan Rather
NBC	Today						Local and/or syndicated programming						Days of Our Lives		Passions		Local and/or syndicated programming							NBC Nightly News with Tom Brokaw
UPN	The Legend of Tarzan	**Digimon: Digital Monsters**	Recess	Buzz Lightyear of Star Command	Local and/or syndicated programming																			
The WB	Local and/or syndicated programming																Scooby-Doo (Mon.-Tue.; Thu.-Fri.); Rescue Heroes: Global Response Team (Wed.)	Jackie Chan Adventures	Pokémon	Yu-Gi-Oh!	Local and/or syndicated programming			

ABC note: Port Charles aired its final episode on October 3, 2003. ABC returned the 12:30 pm timeslot to its affiliates on October 6. Some affiliates did not air the program at its intended timeslot during its last three months on the air.

=== Saturday ===
Network		7:00 am	7:30 am	8:00 am	8:30 am	9:00 am	9:30 am	10:00 am	10:30 am	11:00 am	11:30 am	noon	12:30 pm	1:00 pm	1:30 pm	2:00 pm	2:30 pm	3:00 pm	3:30 pm	4:00 pm	4:30 pm	5:00 pm	5:30 pm	6:00 pm	6:30 pm
ABC	Fall	Local and/or syndicated programming		Teamo Supremo	Recess	**Fillmore!**	Recess	Lizzie McGuire	**The Proud Family**	**Kim Possible**	Power Rangers Wild Force		NBA Inside Stuff	College Football on ABC											
ABC	Spring	Local and/or syndicated programming		Teamo Supremo	Recess	**Fillmore!**	Recess	Lizzie McGuire	**The Proud Family**	**Kim Possible**	**Power Rangers Ninja Storm**		NBA Inside Stuff	ABC Sports and/or local programming				ABC Sports programming						Local news	ABC World News Saturday
CBS	Fall	Blue's Clues	Dora the Explorer	**Hey Arnold!**	**The Wild Thornberrys**	The Saturday Early Show				**As Told by Ginger**	**Pelswick**	SEC on CBS													
CBS	Winter	Blue's Clues	Dora the Explorer	**Hey Arnold!**	**The Wild Thornberrys**	The Saturday Early Show				Hey Arnold!	As Told by Ginger	CBS Sports and/or local programming						CBS Sports programming						Local news	CBS Evening News
CBS	February	**Rugrats**	The Wild Thornberrys	**ChalkZone**	Hey Arnold!	The Saturday Early Show				Dora the Explorer	Blue's Clues	CBS Sports and/or local programming						CBS Sports programming						Local news	CBS Evening News
CBS	August	The Wild Thornberrys	Hey Arnold!	**ChalkZone**	Little Bill	The Saturday Early Show				Dora the Explorer	Blue's Clues	CBS Sports and/or local programming						CBS Sports programming						Local news	CBS Evening News
NBC	Fall	Local and/or syndicated programming		Today				**Prehistoric Planet**	**Croc Files**	**Operation Junkyard**	**Endurance**	**Scout's Safari**	**Strange Days at Blake Holsey High**	NBC Sports and/or local programming				NBC Sports programming						Local news	NBC Nightly News
NBC	May	Local and/or syndicated programming		Today				**Adventure Camp**	**Croc Files**	**Trading Spaces: Boys vs. Girls**	**Endurance**	**Strange Days at Blake Holsey High**	**Scout's Safari**	NBC Sports and/or local programming				NBC Sports programming						Local news	NBC Nightly News
NBC	July	Local and/or syndicated programming		Today				**Croc Files**	**Croc Files**	**Trading Spaces: Boys vs. Girls**	**Strange Days at Blake Holsey High**	**Scout's Safari**	**Adventure Camp**	NBC Sports and/or local programming				NBC Sports programming						Local news	NBC Nightly News
Fox	Fall	Local and/or syndicated programming		**Stargate Infinity**	**Ultraman Tiga**	**Kirby: Right Back at Ya!**	**Ultimate Muscle: The Kinnikuman Legacy**	**Ultraman Tiga**	**Ultimate Muscle: The Kinnikuman Legacy**	**Kirby: Right Back at Ya!**	**Fighting Foodons**	**NFL Under the Helmet**	Fox Sports and/or local programming												
Fox	October	Local and/or syndicated programming		**Stargate Infinity**	**Fighting Foodons**	**Kirby: Right Back at Ya!**	**Ultimate Muscle: The Kinnikuman Legacy**	**Ultimate Muscle: The Kinnikuman Legacy**	**Fighting Foodons**	**Kirby: Right Back at Ya!**	**Ultraman Tiga**	**NFL Under the Helmet**	Fox Sports and/or local programming												
Fox	Spring	Local and/or syndicated programming		**Fighting Foodons**	Back to the Future	**Teenage Mutant Ninja Turtles**	**Kirby: Right Back at Ya!**	**Ultimate Muscle: The Kinnikuman Legacy**	**Teenage Mutant Ninja Turtles**	**The Cramp Twins**	**Pirate Islands**	**NFL Under the Helmet**	Fox Sports and/or local programming												
Fox	Summer	Local and/or syndicated programming		**Fighting Foodons**	Back to the Future	**Kirby: Right Back at Ya!**	**Ultimate Muscle: The Kinnikuman Legacy**	**Ultimate Muscle: The Kinnikuman Legacy**	**Teenage Mutant Ninja Turtles**	**Teenage Mutant Ninja Turtles**	**WMAC Masters**	Local and/or syndicated programming	This Week in Baseball	Fox Sports and/or local programming											
The WB	Fall	Local and/or syndicated programming		Yu-Gi-Oh!	**What's New Scooby-Doo?**	Jackie Chan Adventures	**Ozzy & Drix**	Pokémon	**¡Mucha Lucha!**	Yu-Gi-Oh!	X-Men: Evolution	Local and/or syndicated programming													
The WB	February	Local and/or syndicated programming		What's New Scooby-Doo?	Yu-Gi-Oh!	Jackie Chan Adventures	The Mummy	Pokémon	Static Shock	Yu-Gi-Oh!	¡Mucha Lucha! (Jan. 25-Feb. 8) / Ozzy & Drix (Feb. 15-Mar. 8) / Cubix: Robots for Everyone	Local and/or syndicated programming													
The WB	May	Local and/or syndicated programming		What's New Scooby-Doo?	Yu-Gi-Oh!	Jackie Chan Adventures	**MegaMan: NT Warrior**	Pokémon	Static Shock	Yu-Gi-Oh!	The Mummy	Local and/or syndicated programming													
The WB	August	Local and/or syndicated programming		Pokémon	Yu-Gi-Oh!	Jackie Chan Adventures	Ozzy & Drix	Pokémon	X-Men: Evolution	Yu-Gi-Oh!	Static Shock	Local and/or syndicated programming													

=== Sunday ===
Network		7:00 am	7:30 am	8:00 am	8:30 am	9:00 am	9:30 am	10:00 am	10:30 am	11:00 am	11:30 am	noon	12:30 pm	1:00 pm	1:30 pm	2:00 pm	2:30 pm	3:00 pm	3:30 pm	4:00 pm	4:30 pm	5:00 pm	5:30 pm	6:00 pm	6:30 pm
ABC		Local and/or syndicated programming						This Week with George Stephanopoulos		ABC Sports and/or local programming														Local news	ABC World News Sunday
CBS	Fall	Local and/or syndicated programming				CBS News Sunday Morning			Face the Nation	Local and/or syndicated programming		NFL Today		NFL on CBS (if no doubleheader this week or opposite network is airing a home game, only one NFL game at 1pm or 4pm ET, paid programming airing before game or after post-game show)											
CBS	Mid-winter	Local and/or syndicated programming				CBS News Sunday Morning			Face the Nation	Local and/or syndicated programming		CBS Sports and/or local programming												Local news	CBS Evening News
NBC		Local and/or syndicated programming		Today		Meet the Press		Local and/or syndicated programming				NBC Sports and/or local programming												Local news	NBC Nightly News
Fox	Fall	Local and/or syndicated programming				Fox News Sunday		Local and/or syndicated programming				Fox NFL Sunday		Fox NFL (if no doubleheader this week, only one NFL game at 1pm or 4pm ET opposite network is airing a home game, paid programming airing before game or after post-game show)											
Fox	Mid-winter	Local and/or syndicated programming				Fox News Sunday		Local and/or syndicated programming				Fox Sports and/or local programming												Local and/or syndicated programming	
UPN		Local and/or syndicated programming				The Legend of Tarzan	**Digimon: Digital Monsters**	Recess	Buzz Lightyear of Star Command	Local and/or syndicated programming															

== By network ==
=== ABC ===
Returning series:

- ABC World News Tonight with Peter Jennings
- All My Children
- General Hospital
- Good Morning America
- One Life to Live
- Port Charles
- This Week with George Stephanopoulos
- The View
- ABC Kids
  - Lizzie McGuire
  - Recess
  - Teamo Supremo

New series:

- ABC Kids
  - **Fillmore!**
  - **Kim Possible**
  - NBA Inside Stuff (moved from TNBC)
  - **Power Rangers Ninja Storm**
  - Power Rangers Wild Force (moved from Fox Kids)
  - **The Proud Family**

Not returning from 2001–02:

- Disney's One Saturday Morning
  - House of Mouse
  - Even Stevens
  - Lloyd in Space
  - Mary-Kate and Ashley in Action!
  - Sabrina: The Animated Series
  - The New Adventures of Winnie the Pooh (reruns)
  - Teacher's Pet
  - The Weekenders

=== CBS ===
Returning series:

- As the World Turns
- The Bold and the Beautiful
- The Early Show
- CBS Evening News with Dan Rather
- CBS News Sunday Morning with Charles Osgood
- Face the Nation
- Guiding Light
- The Price is Right
- The Saturday Early Show
- The Young and the Restless
- Nick Jr. on CBS
  - Blue's Clues
  - Dora the Explorer
  - Little Bill

New series:

- **Nick on CBS**
  - **As Told by Ginger**
  - **ChalkZone**
  - **Hey Arnold!**
  - **Pelswick**
  - **Rugrats**
  - **The Wild Thornberrys**

Not returning from 2001–02:

- Nick Jr. on CBS
  - Bob the Builder
  - Franklin
  - Oswald

=== NBC ===
Returning series:

- Days of Our Lives
- Meet the Press
- NBC Nightly News with Tom Brokaw
- Passions
- Today with Katie Couric and Matt Lauer

New series:

- Discovery Kids on NBC
  - **Adventure Camp**
  - **Croc Files**
  - **Endurance**
  - **Operation Junkyard**
  - **Prehistoric Planet**
  - **Scout's Safari**
  - **Strange Days at Blake Holsey High**
  - **Trading Spaces: Boys vs. Girls**

Not returning from 2001–02:

- TNBC
  - All About Us
  - City Guys
  - NBA Inside Stuff (moved to ABC Kids)
  - Just Deal
  - Sk8

=== Fox ===
Returning series:

- Fox News Sunday
- This Week in Baseball

New series:

- Fox Box
  - Back to the Future
  - **The Cramp Twins**
  - **Fighting Foodons**
  - **Kirby: Right Back at Ya!**
  - **Pirate Islands**
  - **Stargate Infinity**
  - **Teenage Mutant Ninja Turtles**
  - **Ultimate Muscle: The Kinnikuman Legacy**
  - **Ultraman Tiga**
  - **WMAC Masters**
- Fox Sports
  - **NFL Under the Helmet**

Not returning from 2001–02:

- Fox Kids
  - Action Man
  - Alienators: Evolution Continues
  - Digimon: Digital Monsters (moved to UPN)
  - Galidor: Defenders of the Outer Dimension
  - Life with Louie (reruns)
  - The Magic School Bus (reruns)
  - Medabots
  - Mon Colle Knights
  - Moolah Beach
  - The New Woody Woodpecker Show
  - Power Rangers Time Force
  - Power Rangers Wild Force (moved to ABC Kids)
  - The Ripping Friends
  - Transformers: Robots in Disguise

=== UPN ===
Returning series:

- Disney's One Too
  - Buzz Lightyear of Star Command
  - The Legend of Tarzan
  - Recess

New series:

- Disney's One Too
  - **Digimon: Digital Monsters** (moved from Fox Kids)

Not returning from 2001–02:

- Disney's One Too
  - Sabrina: The Animated Series
  - The Weekenders

=== The WB ===
Returning series:

- Kids WB!
  - Cubix: Robots for Everyone
  - Jackie Chan Adventures
  - The Mummy
  - Pokémon: Master Quest
  - Rescue Heroes: Global Response Team
  - Scooby-Doo
  - Static Shock
  - X-Men: Evolution
  - Yu-Gi-Oh!

New series:

- Kids WB!
  - **MegaMan: NT Warrior**
  - **¡Mucha Lucha!**
  - **Ozzy & Drix**
  - **What's New Scooby-Doo?**

Not returning from 2001–02:

- Kids WB!
  - Batman Beyond
  - Cardcaptors
  - The Nightmare Room
  - Phantom Investigators
  - The Powerpuff Girls
  - Sailor Moon
  - The Zeta Project

== See also ==
- 2002–03 United States network television schedule (prime-time)
- 2002–03 United States network television schedule (late night)
