= Magna Home Entertainment =

Australian home entertainment distributor

- Magna Home Entertainment's 15,500m² distribution facility at Eagle Farm, Brisbane, Queensland
- Formerly: Magna Vision (1983–1990s); Magna Pacific (1990s–2010s)
- Type: Independent
- Founded: 1983
- Defunct: 2012
- Successor: Beyond Home Entertainment
- Headquarters: Brisbane, Queensland, Australia
- Area served: Australia, New Zealand
- Products: DVD, Blu-ray Disc, Digital Video

Magna Home Entertainment was an independent home entertainment distributor headquartered in Brisbane, Queensland, Australia, operating within Australia and New Zealand. As of February 2009, Magna Home Entertainment became a fully owned subsidiary of Beyond International (ASX:BYI), an Australian television production and distribution company. Magna Home Entertainment is the sister company of Melbourne-based home entertainment distributor Beyond Home Entertainment, also a subsidiary of Beyond International. Magna Home Entertainment distributes television series, documentaries and feature films.

== Company history ==
The company was incorporated in 1983. Principal activities of the company in the 1980s included the import and wholesale distribution of video cassettes, audio cassettes, micro cassettes, and computer equipment. In 1990, the company was publicly listed as Magna Pacific (Holdings) Ltd.

During the 1990s, the company expanded its activities into intellectual property licensing, acquiring videogram home entertainment distribution rights for a number of licensed properties. Rapid growth in the late 1990s and early 2000s saw Magna listed in Business Review Weekly's Fast 100 List, as the company expanded its distribution and acquired several key licensed properties that ensured strong growth in home entertainment revenue.

The company had a good relationship with Becker Entertainment, and the company had a 50% stake in the company between the late 1990s and July 2004, when the company sold off its interest.

Magna followed the industry migration to DVD media during this period, and now releases home entertainment content via DVD, Blu-ray, and digital-file-based distribution. Magna Pacific is a budget distributor known for producing bare-bones media without extras or subtitles. In 2012, the Magna branding was dropped in favor of the Beyond branding.

== Distribution facility ==
Magna Home Entertainment's headquarters in Eagle Farm, Brisbane, Queensland includes a distribution facility. It opened in July 2006.

== Titles distributed ==
Magna Home Entertainment was a home entertainment distributor for children's brands, television series, documentaries, and feature films.

=== Children's series ===
- Archibald the Koala
- The Avengers: Earth's Mightiest Heroes
- The Adventures of Blinky Bill
- Bananaman
- Berenstain Bears
- Beyblade V-Force
- Bigfoot Presents: Meteor and the Mighty Monster Trucks
- Blazing Dragons
- Bolts & Blip
- Bratz
- Care Bears
- Chaotic
- Code Lyoko
- Corduroy
- Corneil & Bernie
- Crush Gear
- Cubix
- Dennis the Menace
- Dinosaur King
- Dog City
- Donkey Kong Country
- Dumb Bunnies
- The Elephant Princess
- The Fairly OddParents
- Fantastic Four: World's Greatest Heroes
- Fly Tales
- Fraggle Rock
- Franklin
- George and Martha
- H_{2}O: Just Add Water
- Hamtaro
- Harry and His Bucket Full of Dinosaurs
- Holly Hobbie and Friends
- Inspector Gadget
- Jibber Jabber
- Kenny The Shark
- Larry the Lawnmower
- Little Charlie Bear
- Little People
- Marvel Knights Motion Comics
- Megaman NT Warrior
- Moville Mysteries
- My Little Pony
- The Neverending Story
- Percy the Park Keeper
- Pet Alien
- Pigeon Boy
- Pingu
- Pippi Longstocking
- Pokémon
- Roary the Racing Car
- Rollbots
- Round the Twist
- Ruby Gloom
- Rupert
- Sabrina: The Animated Series
- SD Gundam Force
- Seaside Hotel
- Sheeep
- Shinchan
- Skippy: Adventures in Bushtown
- Smurfs
- Strawberry Shortcake
- The Super Hero Squad Show
- Teenage Mutant Ninja Turtles
- The Three Friends and Jerry
- Totally Spies!
- Tots TV
- Tractor Tom
- Tutenstein
- The Upside Down Show
- Viva Piñata
- Winx Club
- Wolverine and the X-Men
- Yu-Gi-Oh!
- Yu-Gi-Oh! GX
- Zoids: Chaotic Century
- Zoids: Fuzors
- Zoids: New Century

=== Television series ===
- 3rd Rock from the Sun
- American Chopper
- American Hot Rod
- Deadliest Catch
- Cake Boss
- Dirty Jobs
- LA Ink
- Man vs. Wild
- Miami Ink
- Overhaulin'
- The Cosby Show
- Roseanne
- Dog the Bounty Hunter
- Gene Simmons Family Jewels
- River Monsters
- Trailer Park Boys
- Wire in the Blood

=== Documentaries ===
- Discovery Channel
- History Channel
- Biography Channel
- The Crocodile Hunter

=== Feature films ===
- Dot Goes to Hollywood (1987)
- Four Weddings and a Funeral (1994)
- Scream (1996)
- Dances with Wolves (1990)
- FairyTale: A True Story (1997)
- Just Friends
- Because I Said So
- Bratz: The Movie
- August Rush
- Penelope
- Over Her Dead Body
- Chaos Theory
- The Accidental Husband
- The Mutant Chronicles
- Righteous Kill
- Hong Kong Legends
- The Blair Witch Project

== See also ==
- Beyond International
