= 2005–06 United States network television schedule (late night) =

These are the late night schedules for the four United States broadcast networks that offer programming during this time period, from September 2005 to August 2006. All times are Eastern or Pacific. Affiliates will fill non-network schedule with local, syndicated, or paid programming. Affiliates also have the option to preempt or delay network programming at their discretion.

== Legend ==
- Light blue indicates Local programming.
- Gray indicates encore programming.
- Yellow indicates late night talk or variety shows.
- Gold indicates network news programming.

== Schedule ==
=== Monday-Friday ===
Network	11:00 PM	11:35 PM	12:00 AM	12:30 AM	1:00 AM	1:30 AM	2:00 AM	2:30 AM	3:00 AM	3:30 AM	4:00 AM	4:30 AM	5:00 AM	5:30 AM
ABC	Local Programming	Nightline	Jimmy Kimmel Live!		Local Programming		ABC World News Now						ABC World News This Morning	
CBS	Local Programming	Late Show with David Letterman		The Late Late Show with Craig Ferguson (12:35)		Local Programming	Up to the Minute						CBS Morning News	
NBC	Local Programming	The Tonight Show with Jay Leno		Late Night with Conan O'Brien		Last Call with Carson Daly	Local Programming		The Tonight Show with Jay Leno (R)		Local Programming	Early Today	Local Programming	

=== Saturday ===
Network	11:00 PM	11:30 PM	12:00 AM	12:30 AM	1:00 AM	1:30 AM	2:00 AM	2:30 AM	3:00 AM	3:30 AM	4:00 AM	4:30 AM	5:00 AM	5:30 AM
NBC	Local Programming	Saturday Night Live			Local Programming									
Fox	MADtv		Local Programming											

== By network ==
=== ABC ===
Returning series

- ABC World News Now
- ABC World News This Morning
- Jimmy Kimmel Live!
- Nightline

=== CBS ===
Returning series

- CBS Morning News
- Late Show with David Letterman
- The Late Late Show with Craig Ferguson
- Up to the Minute

Not returning from 2004-05:

- The Late Late Show

=== Fox ===
Returning series

- MADtv

=== NBC ===
Returning series

- Early Today
- Last Call with Carson Daly
- Late Night with Conan O'Brien
- Saturday Night Live
- The Tonight Show with Jay Leno
