= Skunked TV =

- Starring: Madai Zaldivar; Chuck Cureau
- Country of origin: United States
- Original language: English
- No. of episodes: 15

Production
- Executive producer: Guy Nickerson
- Running time: 30 minutes (w/commercials)
- Production company: Spectrum Productions

Original release
- Network: Discovery Kids, NBC
- Release: July 24 – August 1, 2004

Skunked TV is an American comedy television series that originally aired on the Discovery Kids on NBC block. Children are pranked by seeing animals do weird activities (such as letting birds fly out a cage while the children are supposed to watch them and being blamed by the "zoo keeper" hosts) on the show. The host was Madai Zaldivar and the co-host was Chuck Cureau. The series ran in 2004 but was canceled after one season of 15 episodes.

== Episodes ==
1. Who Let the Bird Out?

2. Scrambled Eggs

3. Egg Drop

4. Tangled Web

5. Dog for a Day

6. Bird Brain

7. For the Birds

8. Swine Song

9. Leapin' Lemur

10. Cat-Napped

11. Love Stinks

12. Egg Head

13. Super Size Surprise

14. Stinker

15. Whale of a Tale
