= Tutenstein =

- Genre: Action; Adventure; Science fantasy; Horror
- Created by: Jay Stephens
- Directed by: Bob Richardson; Norton Virgien; Rob LaDuca
- Voices of: Jeannie Elias; Donna Cherry; Crystal Scales; Leah Lynette; Daran Norris; David Lodge
- Composer: Guy Michelmore
- Country of origin: United States
- Original language: English
- No. of seasons: 3
- No. of episodes: 39 + 1 film

Production
- Executive producers: William T. Baumann; Paul Cummins; Jessica Hanlon; Bruce D. Johnson
- Producers: Siobhán Ní Ghadhra; Tom Gleason; Mark Seidenberg
- Editor: Tony Mark
- Running time: 18–22 minutes per episode
- Production company: PorchLight Entertainment

Original release
- Network: Discovery Kids
- Release: November 1, 2003 – October 11, 2008

Tutenstein is an American animated television series, produced by PorchLight Entertainment for Discovery Kids based on the comics by Jay Stephens. The series was first premiered on Discovery Kids' Saturday morning block on NBC on November 1, 2003. It ended on October 11, 2008. The series features young mummy Tutankhensetamun (based on real-life Tutankhamun and usually called "Tutenstein" as in the title) who is awakened about 3,000 years after his accidental death and now must face the fact that his kingdom is gone. The name is a portmanteau of Tutankhamun and Frankenstein.

Beginning in August 2020, Yippee TV, the Christian subscription-video-on-demand streaming service that streamed the show under license from Trinity Animation Group, made the series officially available for streaming on YouTube.

In October 2022, it was announced that a reboot is currently in the works and that it would have a completely new look. There has been no updates or further information since then.

== Plot ==
Tutankhensetamun was an impulsive but kindhearted young Egyptian Pharaoh who lived a luxurious but short life. He died because back in Ancient Egypt he saved a friend of his from being smashed by rocks from a collapsing temple, so he himself was crushed to death. He carries the mighty Sceptre of Was, and the circumstances of his death are unknown at first.

In the 21st century, 12-year-old middle school student Cleo Carter accidentally witnesses his awakening after a bolt of lightning hits the mummified body of Tut that is on display at the local museum. She with her anthropomorphic pet cat Luxor must now help Tut to find his way around in the modern world. During the whole series, Set, god of disorder and violence, attempts to destroy Tut and gain possession of the Sceptre to become the ruler of all.

== Characters ==
=== Main ===
- Tutankhensetamun, "Tutenstein", (voiced by Jeannie Elias in the first two seasons and early season 3 and Donna Cherry in the last four episodes), is a very impulsive but kind-hearted 10-year-old mummy who lives in the museum. His nickname, Tutenstein, is a play on words on Frankenstein. He is often visited by Cleo and Luxor.
- Cleo Carter (voiced by Crystal Scales in the first two seasons and early season 3 and Leah Lynette in the last four episodes) is a 12-year-old African-American girl who wants to become an Egyptologist. After chasing her cat, Luxor, she accidentally brought Tut back to life. Her father is a well experienced Egyptologist and archeologist.
- Luxor (voiced by Daran Norris in the first two seasons and David Lodge in season 3) is Cleo's pet cat. When Tut is resurrected, Luxor gains the capability of speech and becomes his self-appointed servant.

=== Supporting ===
- Walter Jacobs (voiced by Joey Simmrin) is the easily frightened, friendly yet dimwitted, young security guard at the museum.
- Professor Horace Behdety (voiced by Lex Lang) is a haughty professor and the cranky director of the museum. It is implied that Behdety discovered Tutankhensetamun's tomb.
- Dr. Roxanne Vanderwheele (voiced by Jeannie Elias in the first two seasons and early season 3 and Cindy Robinson in the last four episodes) is Behdety's colleague, a bright young scholar and thoroughly modern archaeologist.
- Rosalie Rivara (voiced by Candi Milo in the first two seasons and Wendee Lee in the third season) is a vain, publicity hungry television news reporter.
- Natasha (voiced by Liza Del Mundo in the first two seasons and Wendee Lee in the third season) is Cleo's best friend with a bad habit of lying, and she doesn't appear to be very bright.
- Kyle (voiced by Debi Derryberry in the first two seasons and Cindy Robinson in the third season) is one of Cleo's friends and has a crush on Natasha.
- Jake (voiced by Justin Cowden) is one of Cleo's friends and her secret crush.
- Iris Carter (voiced by Vanessa Marshall) is Cleo's mother and a construction engineer.

=== The Egyptian Gods ===
The almighty and responsible gods of ancient Egypt are often overseers of all the events of the immortal world and the underworld.

- Set (voiced by Daran Norris in the first two seasons and David Lodge in season 3) is the Egyptian god of chaos, destruction, and disorder, who is the main antagonist. For thousands of years, he has been condemned to the darkest pit of the Egyptian underworld.
- Sekhem (voiced by Roger Rose) and Khesef(voiced by Lex Lang) are two of the many demons who work for Set.
- Apep (voiced by Cam Clarke) is a demon of the Egyptian underworld who takes the form of a giant water snake.
- Ammut (voiced by Wendee Lee) is a demonic deity who devours the hearts of the dead.
- Osiris (voiced by Daran Norris) is the Egyptian god of the afterlife, the underworld and rebirth who judges humans after their death.
- Isis (voiced by Cindy Robinson) is the Egyptian goddess of magic, motherhood and wisdom. She is the wife of Osiris.
- Ra (voiced by David Lodge) is the Egyptian god of the Sun. He is one of the most important figures in ancient Egyptian religion, since the Sun was sacred to them.
- Horus (voiced by Jess Harnell) is the Egyptian god of kingship and the sky. He is the gods' greatest and most revered warrior.
- Anubis (voiced by Lex Lang) is the Egyptian god of mummification, preparations and ceremonies for the dead. He works along with Thoth under Osiris to ensure order and bring balance to all the worlds.
- Bastet (voiced by Wendee Lee) is the Egyptian goddess of cleanliness, the household and protector of cats.
- Thoth (voiced by Michael Bell) is the Egyptian god of science, knowledge and writing. He works along with Anubis under Osiris to ensure order and bring balance to all the worlds.
- Maat (voiced by Wendee Lee) is the Egyptian goddess of the concepts of truth, law, justice, order, balance, and harmony.
- Nut (voiced by Michelle Ruff) is the Egyptian goddess of the sky and stars.
- Geb (voiced by Michael Gough) is the Egyptian God of Earth.
- Bennu is a sacred bird in ancient Egyptian mythology linked with the sun, creation, and rebirth.
- Hathor (voiced by Kate Higgins) is the Egyptian goddess of joy, beauty, music and feminine love.
- Sekhmet (voiced by Jeannie Elias) is the Egyptian goddess of battle, warfare and revenge. She is Hathor's wrathful alter ego.
- Khnum
- Mut
- Bes is a minor ancient Egyptian deity worshipped as a protector of households, and in particular, of mothers, children and childbirth.
- Hemsut
- Ptah
- Serket is the Egyptian goddess of nature, animals, medicine and healing from venom/poison.
- Sobek is the Egyptian god of the Nile river, associated with pharaonic power, fertility, and military prowess.
- Wadjet is the Egyptian goddess of protection. Her symbol is used by royalty to guard them from evil both during their mortal life and in the afterlife.
- Imhotep is an Egyptian chancellor to the pharaoh Djoser, probable architect of the step pyramid, and high priest of the sun god Ra at Heliopolis.
- Atum is the Egyptian god of creation and life, said to have made the first humans out of clay.

== Episodes ==
=== Series overview ===
Season	Episodes	Originally released	
Season	Episodes	First released	Last released
1	13	November 1, 2003	March 6, 2004
2	13	September 4, 2004	November 19, 2005
3	13	September 9, 2006	January 13, 2007
Television film	1	October 11, 2008	

=== Season 1 (2003–04) ===
No. overall	No. in season	Title	Directed by	Written by	Original release date	Prod. code
1	1	"The Awakening"	Bob Richardson	Mark Seidenberg	November 1, 2003	101
Lightning strikes museum mummy Pharaoh Tut-ankh-en-set-Amun's sarcophagus and brings him back to life in the 21st Century, where he meets his friends Cleo, a 12-year-old girl, and her pet cat Luxor and struggles to adapt to the strange modern world.
2	2	"The Curse of the Pharaoh"	Rob LaDuca	Mark Seidenberg	November 8, 2003	102
When mysterious stranger El Zabkar accidentally sees Tut at the museum, he unleashes the goddess Ammut from the underworld to destroy the living mummy. It's up to Tut, Cleo and Luxor to figure out how to get rid of her.
3	3	"Clash of the Shabitis"	Bob Richardson	Mark Seidenberg	November 15, 2003	103
Cleo asks Tut to help clean the museum, but he decides to bring his shabtis (wooden tomb servant figurines) to life to do the job for him. When the shabtis get out of control, Tut must stop them before anyone realizes magic is afoot.
4	4	"I Did it My Way"	Rob LaDuca	Brooks Watchel	November 22, 2003	104
Frustrated by modern life's complications, Tut uses the Bennu Bird to make the world like it was in ancient Egypt. But ruling the ancient world is harder than Tut remembers, and he must decide what's best for his people before the spell is irreversible.
5	5	"The Boat of Millions of Years"	Rob LaDuca	Mark Seidenberg	December 6, 2003	106
Tut has so much fun watching movies at Cleo's house, he wishes it would never end. He calls upon the sun god Ra to delay sunrise so he can stay up longer. But Tut's wish stops time and puts Ra in danger, so Tut must help Ra and save the day.
6	6	"The Powerful One"	Bob Richardson	Kevin Hopps	January 3, 2004	105
When Tut's unknowing subjects fail to build him a pyramid on demand, his complaints accidentally summon lioness goddess Sekhmet, protector of pharaohs, who begins a vengeful rampage against humanity. It's up to Tut, Cleo and Luxor to stop her.
7	7	"There's Something About Natasha"	Rob LaDuca	Julie & Timothy Cahill	January 10, 2004	108
Tut gets a crush on Cleo's best friend Natasha and summons Bes, the ancient Egyptian patron god of children, to help him win her heart. But the spell's results aren't what Tut expected, and he must decide whether Nat's his true love or just a love zombie.
8	8	"The King of Memphis"	Bob Richardson	Gordon Bressack	January 17, 2004	107
Tut is furious that the Kingland amusement park is dedicated to a king other than him. Mistaking costumed park patrons for multiples of the "imposter" king, Tut endangers his life by separating the two parts of his soul (Ba & Ka) to compete with his rival.
9	9	"Roommates"	Rob LaDuca	Brian Swenlin	January 24, 2004	112
Tut has trouble finding peace and quiet at the museum, so he decides he will move in with Cleo.
10	10	"Ghostbusted"	Rob LaDuca	Brooks Wachtel	January 31, 2004	110
Tut is up to his old tricks again, but this time he gets caught cheating while playing Senet with the Goddess Isis. Furious with Tut's behavior, she summons the ghost of Nutka.
11	11	"Near Dead Experience"	Rob LaDuca	Ken Koonce & Michael Merton	February 21, 2004	109
Since Tut is not used to the advancement of modern day medicine, he fears for Cleo's life when she develops a cold. Tut tries to make Cleo feel better, but things get out of hand when his doctor Imhotep tries to Mummify her.
12	12	"The Unsafety Zone"	Bob Richardson	Kevin D. Campell	February 28, 2004	111
When the alarm system sets off in the new Geb exhibit, Tut is awoken from his sleep. Furious that someone would allow such noise in his royal slumber, Tut decides to turn off the alarm only that allows two thieves to take the Crown of Geb.
13	13	"Happy Coronation Day, Tutenstein"	Rob LaDuca	Nick DuBois	March 6, 2004	113
Tut feels unappreciated when Cleo and Luxor throw a Coronation Day party for him that doesn't meet his expectations. While Tut is preoccupied with his needs, demons of the underworld prepare to steal the Sceptor of Was.

=== Season 2 (2004–05) ===
No. overall	No. in season	Title	Directed by	Written by	Original release date	Prod. code
14	1	"Old Man Tut"	Bob Richardson	Brian Swenlin	September 4, 2004	208
Tut hates being young, so when he breaks his ankh, the next day he turns into a teenager, then the next day he turns into an old man.
15	2	"Cleo's Catastrophe"	Rob LaDuca	Brooks Wachtel & Cynthia Harrison	September 11, 2004	209
Luxor becomes overwhelmed splitting his time hanging with Cleo and finishing all of the Tut's chores. Tut tries to solve the problem by casting a "perfect spell", but accidentally switches Cleo's and Luxor's bodies.
16	3	"The Shadow Gobbler"	Bob Richardson	Brooks Wachtel	September 25, 2004	203
Tut, Cleo, and Luxor all lose their shadows when Tut messes with the powers of ancient magic scrolls.
17	4	"Tut Jr."	Bob Richardson	Kevin Hopps	October 2, 2004	204
Tut convinces Cleo that he is full of responsibility and is more than able to watch her little cousin Thomas for the day until Tut loses Thomas to the underworld.
18	5	"Something Sphinx"	Rob LaDuca	John Behnke & Rob Humphrey	October 9, 2004	205
Luxor feels insignificant when Tut hires a new assistant named Hedgewere who is a baboon servant to help him out. After feeling useless to the pharaoh, Luxor packs up and leaves after he has departed that Tut and Hedgewere run into a deadly scorpion.
19	6	"The Supreme Tut"	Bob Richardson	Mark Seidenberg	October 16, 2004	206
When Tutenstein decides that his afterlife as a pharaoh couldn't get any worse, it does when Cleo refuses him creamed ice. Not being able to handle rejection of his whims, Tut convinces the higher ups to turn him into a god.
20	7	"The Day of the Undead"	Rob LaDuca	Mark Seidenberg	October 30, 2004	213
Tut learns about Halloween and decides he wants to go trick-or-treating. But when Cleo explains that she and her friends are going to a haunted house, Tut tries to impress everyone by summoning a real ghost.
21	8	"Friends"	Bob Richardson	Mark Seidenberg	November 27, 2004	201
Tut meets with Buzz and Shakey who are two young teen delinquents and ignores Cleo and Luxor's warning about them. Instead, Tut stirs up trouble that ultimately leads him to the Hall of Two Truths in the underworld, where the gods will decide Tut's fate.
22	9	"Green-Eyed Mummy"	Bob Richardson	John Behnke & Rob Humphrey	December 4, 2004	202
Tut becomes jealous when Cleo starts spending her time at the new mammoth exhibit. After Tut sends the mammoth to the underworld to regain Cleo's attention, he realizes how much he has hurt Cleo.
23	10	"Queen for a Day"	Rob LaDuca	Mark Seidenberg	January 15, 2005	211
Cleo and Luxor realize that Tut has been kidnapped when they find only his Scepter of Was left behind. Meanwhile, Cleo must learn how to use the Scepter and transport her and Luxor to the underworld to save Tut from the god of chaos and destruction.
24	11	"Procras-Tut-nation"	Rob LaDuca	John Behnke & Rob Humphrey	October 1, 2005	207
Tut decides that skateboarding is more important than completing the Ancient Egyptian Sed Festival. If Cleo doesn't find Tut in time and get him to go to the festival, he could lose all his power.
25	12	"Behdety Late Than Never"	Bob Richardson	John Behnke & Rob Humphrey	October 22, 2005	210
Bedhety gets blamed when Tut cranks up the heat and the bills in the museum. After being framed by a conman, Bedhety is sent to jail. Tut, Cleo, and Luxor must prove Bedhety's innocence before the museum shuts down.
26	13	"Walter the Brain"	Bob Richardson	Mark Seidenberg	November 19, 2005	212
Tut feels guilty for almost getting Walter fired by Bedhety. To make up for it, Tut uses the magic Scroll of Thoth and grants Walter intelligence. Unfortunately, Thoth isn't happy that the secret scrolls were used. Note: This is the last episode where Daran Norris voices Luxor.

=== Season 3 (2006–07) ===
Note: All episodes in this season were directed by Norton Virgien.

No. overall	No. in season	Title	Written by	Original release date	Prod. code
27	1	"The Comeback Kid"	Kelly Ward & Cliff Macgillivroy	September 9, 2006	301
Tut's desire to be human again leads him to carelessly cast a spell without giving thought to the entire process. The spell backfires, bringing a T-Rex skeleton back to flesh-and-blood life, and giving Set a chance to possess the Scepter of Was. Note: This is the first episode where David Lodge voices Luxor, replacing Daran Norris.
28	2	"Rest in Pieces"	Charlotte Fullerton	September 12, 2006	304
Tut wants to do too much at once, so he divides up his body to let his separate pieces enjoy different activities all at the same time. Set orders a hippo demon to hide Tut's pieces, just as Set did to his own brother Osiris in real Egyptian mythology.
29	3	"Irresistible You"	Brooks Wachtel & Cynthia Harrison	September 13, 2006	306
Cleo really wants to be liked by Jake, but involving Tut in her problem only leads to chaos, as Tut orders the goddess Hathor to cast a love spell on Cleo and make her irresistible... with disastrous results.
30	4	"Sleepless in Sarcophagus"	Howard Rabinowitz	September 14, 2006	308
Tut gets a pet snake named Fang to keep him company and help him sleep. But the snake becomes possessed by Denwen, a demon snake god, sent by Set to steal the Scepter of Was. When Cleo becomes suspicious, Denwen tries to turn Tut against her.
31	5	"The Truth Hurts"	Scott Peterson	September 16, 2006	302
Tut's tendency to be blunt insults the Ancient Egyptian gods, who cut him off from their protection and his own powers, and leave him vulnerable to the evil serpent Apep.
32	6	"Was Not Was"	Pamela Hickey & Dennys McCoy	September 23, 2006	303
Tut neglects the Scepter of Was and misplaces it. Unfortunately, Walter finds it, and thinks it's a promotional toy, leaving Walter fair game for an attack by Set and his demons.
33	7	"Tut the Defender"	John Behnke & Rob Humphrey	October 14, 2006	305
Tut wants to be a great military leader like his father, but when he brings two museum statues of Viking warriors to life to do battle with him, Tut finds that it's harder to emulate his father than he thought it would be.
34	8	"Spells and Sleepovers"	Anne D. Bernstein	October 28, 2006	309
Cleo plans an all-girls slumber party and she doesn't invite Tut. Tut can't stand being left out and decides to crash the party. When Cleo dresses Tut up like a girl, to sneak him in, Tut ends up humiliated and storms off vowing to throw a rival all-boy party.
35	9	"Fearless"	Scott Peterson	October 29, 2006	307
Tut tries to prove he is fearless by taking on more and more dangerous tasks until he descends into the Underworld where he finds more fearsome danger than he bargained for. Note: This is the last episode where Jeannie Elias and Crystal Scales voice Tut and Cleo.
36	10	"UnPharaoh"	Charlotte Fullerton	November 25, 2006	310
Set uses his scorpion minion to possess Dr. Vanderwheele into discrediting Tut's Pharaoh title. Cleo struggles to support her friend Tut and find a way to prove his identity, despite having doubts herself about his validity as Pharaoh. Note: This is the first episode where Donna Cherry and Leah Lynette voice Tut and Cleo, replacing Jeannie Elias and Crystal Scales.
37	11	"Into the Past"	John Behnke & Rob Humphrey	December 2, 2006	313
The Mirror of Isis whisks our heroes back to Ancient Egypt, where Tut discovers things weren't quite as perfect as he remembered them. Meanwhile, Cleo is led on a wild goose chase for her missing father by Set and his minions.
38	12	"Tut's Little Problem"	Brian Swenlin	December 9, 2006	311
Fed up with being short, Tut unleashes a spell to increase his size but, when it backfires, Tut first becomes a giant and then dangerously small. Tut learns to accept who he is - just because his height is small doesn't mean he's lacking.
39	13	"Keep Your Wandering Eye to Yourself"	Philip Morton	January 13, 2007	312
Tut becomes jealous of Cleo's life beyond the museum and Cleo's new friend Kara. He decides that spying on them is the obvious answer to his problems of feeling left out and enlists "the wandering eye" to spy on Cleo.

=== Television film (2008) ===
No.	Title	Directed by	Written by	Original release date
40	Clash of the Pharaohs	Charles M. Grosvenor	Rob Humphrey & John Behnke	October 11, 2008
In the series finale, Tut has nightmares about his death, so he uses the mirror of Isis to go back to ancient Egypt to prevent his death from happening, but the artifact is stolen by a thief. Cleo, Luxor and Tut go back to Egypt only finding out that it is a thousand years after Tut's death so he, Luxor, and Cleo get followed by a stranger named Kwmonwati, who crowns Cleo after mistaking her for a pharaoh. Kwmonwati plans to take the mirror of Isis with him but fails. Cleo meets the real Cleopatra and Luxor, Cleo, and Tut finally get home. Tut now knows how he died.

== Production ==
ABN reported "with regard to the ongoing theme of ancient temples and history found in his animated shows Tutenstein and The Secret Saturdays, [Jay] Stephens quips, "I'm a nerd. I like reading about history and mythology. And the past is full of surprises." Stephens spent many years developing the show for television, coming up with the new setting and cast of characters that diverged significantly from the original comics. Stephens became the creative consultant of the show, with character designer Fil Barlow reinterpreting the look of the entire series. Barlow was the production designer until his contracted 20 episodes expired and was fired. His successor was his student, Thomas Perkins.

The production company, PorchLight Entertainment, which is based in Los Angeles, California, has won Emmys for the first and second seasons of the series. Irish TV production company Telegael, which is based in An Spidéal, County Galway, also won an Emmy Award for the second season.

== Historical accuracy ==
Many of the gods portrayed in the series resemble their historical portrayals and all the Egyptian myths mentioned in the show are genuine. The Scepter of Was being portrayed as an all-purpose magic wand is fictional, though the Was itself is a genuine Egyptian symbol. Unlike Tutankhamun, who died at the age of 19, Tutenstein (Tutahnkensetamun) died when he was 10. However, Tutankhamun did become pharaoh at the age of 9, although the show doesn't say what age Tutenstein became pharaoh. On the other hand, Tutenstein is drawn with a cleft lip, just like the real Tutankhamun. The ancient game senet did exist, but as no precise rules for the game have been preserved, the rules as shown in the series are not accurate. Egyptologist Kasia Szpakowska served as a consultant to the series.

== Critical reception ==
Common Sense Media gave the show a rating of 3 stars out of 5, saying "The character of Tut is amusing, with his combination of childishness and egotism, and his interaction with Cleo and Luxor can be quite funny. The resolutions of the stories are fairly predictable – Tut uses his powers for good to help his friends, and harmony is restored – but the situation is unusual enough to keep the show fresh." DVD Verdict said "To be fair, as a product of the Discovery Channel, the producers have tried something slightly different with Tutenstein. Its educational children's programming, the attempt of an educational station to compete with more popular stations. Each episode incorporates some educational tidbits: explaining aspects of ancient Egyptian mythology and history. Unfortunately, the learning gets a bit mixed up with all the other nonsense." The Sydney Morning Herald wrote "It's The Mummy for kids... There's no Brendan Fraser or Rachel Weisz here, but the humorous dialogue – and the inclusion of a talking cat – should be a winner among younger viewers."

=== Awards and nominations ===
Year	Nominee / work	Award	Result
2004	Tutenstein	Daytime Emmy Award for Outstanding Special Class Animated Program	Won
2006	Tutenstein	Daytime Emmy Award for Outstanding Special Class Animated Program	Nominated
2007	Tutenstein	Daytime Emmy Award for Outstanding Special Class Animated Program	Won

== Broadcast ==
The series aired on Discovery Kids and premiered in the United States on November 1, 2003 (along with Kenny the Shark). The final episode aired on January 13, 2007. A TV movie entitled Tutenstein: Clash of the Pharaohs aired on October 11, 2008, ending the series. After the series ended, reruns continued to air on The Hub until December 30, 2012.

In August 2003, Fox Kids Europe acquired the show's television, home video and consumer products rights for Europe, Israel, India and French-speaking Africa from PorchLight, with Buena Vista International Television servicing television distribution. Following the rebrand of the company as Jetix Europe in 2004, the series premiered on the European Jetix networks around that time.

In 2004 the series had its British terrestrial television debut on ITV – first as part of the Saturday morning children's program Ministry of Mayhem, and later in a weekday afternoon slot on CITV, where it was one of the highest-rating shows for kids aged 4–15.

It also aired on Nickelodeon and ABC in Australia, and Maxi TV in Turkey.

In East and Southeast Asia, it aired on Disney Channel.

Beginning on August 18, 2020, the series was officially made available for streaming on YouTube without charge by Yippee TV.

The series, with the exception of the third season, and television special are also available for streaming on Hoopla. The series is also available on the Common Sense Media-owned streaming service Sensical.
