= Discovery Kids on NBC =

Former American children's programming block

- Network: NBC (programmed by Discovery Kids)
- Launched: October 5, 2002
- Closed: September 2, 2006
- Country of origin: United States
- Format: Saturday morning children's program block
- Running time: 3 hours

Discovery Kids on NBC was an American children's programming block that aired on NBC from October 5, 2002 to September 2, 2006, replacing TNBC. The block was produced under a time-lease agreement with Discovery Kids, and featured a mixture of live-action and animated series originated on the cable network that met educational programming requirements defined by the Federal Communications Commission. The programming block was replaced by Qubo as part of a partnership with ION Media, Scholastic, Classic Media (now called DreamWorks Classics) and Corus Entertainment.

== History ==
In December 2001, NBC reached a partnership with Discovery Communications, in which its cable channel Discovery Kids would produce a new three-hour Saturday morning block for the network that would feature programming that met the educational programming guidelines enforced by the Children's Television Act. The block would replace TNBC, a block of live-action series aimed at a teenage audience whose creation was motivated by the success of its series Saved by the Bell. By 2001, TNBC had been undergoing from declining viewership; according to Nielsen Media Research, the block was registering a median viewer age of 41.

Discovery Kids on NBC premiered on October 5, 2002, with its original lineup incorporating three new original series (the Survivor-style reality competition series Endurance, and the scripted series Scout's Safari and Strange Days at Blake Holsey High) and one existing Discovery Kids program (Operation Junkyard); the following year, Trading Spaces: Boys vs. Girls, a child-oriented spin-off of the TLC home renovation reality show Trading Spaces joined the lineup.

The new block came about amidst growing children's programming synergies between broadcast and cable television networks. Prior to the Discovery agreement, CBS had launched a Nickelodeon-branded block in 2000 (following Nickelodeon parent Viacom's merger with CBS), while The WB had begun combining programs from sister channel Cartoon Network onto its Kids' WB lineup as part of a growing cross-promotion arrangement between the cable channel and the block; in addition, one month before Discovery Kids on NBC premiered, ABC relaunched its Saturday morning block as ABC Kids, expanding upon a programming agreement established in 2001 with sister network Disney Channel that later included select programming from both Toon Disney and (in 2004) its own action-oriented block Jetix.

On November 1, 2003, the block introduced educationally-oriented animated programs under the banner "Real Toons" – with two series, Kenny the Shark and Tutenstein; this marked the first time that NBC had aired animation as part of its children's programming lineup since August 1992.

=== Transition to Qubo ===
In March 2006, Discovery declined to renew its contract with NBC for its Saturday morning block, citing a desire to focus its children's programming efforts exclusively on the Discovery Kids cable channel; in May of that year, NBC and Ion Media Networks unveiled a joint venture with Canada-based Corus Entertainment, Scholastic and Classic Media known as Qubo, which would aim to provide educational programming aimed at children between the ages of 4 and 8. The Qubo endeavor included a three-hour Saturday morning block on the network, which replaced Discovery Kids on NBC on September 9, 2006.

== Programming ==
Although the Discovery Kids on NBC block regularly aired on Saturday mornings, affiliates in some parts of the country deferred certain programs within the lineup to Sunday morning timeslots to accommodate locally produced programs (such as weekend morning newscasts) or due to scheduling issues with regional or network sports broadcasts that start in time periods normally occupied by the block.

=== Former programming ===
| Title | Premiere date | End date | Source(s) |
|---|---|---|---|
| Prehistoric Planet | October 5, 2002 | May 10, 2003 | |
| Croc Files | October 5, 2002 | July 2, 2005 | |
| Operation Junkyard | October 5, 2002 | May 10, 2003 | |
| Endurance | October 5, 2002 | September 2, 2006 | |
| Scout's Safari | October 5, 2002 | September 24, 2005 | |
| Strange Days at Blake Holsey High | October 5, 2002 | September 24, 2005 | |
| Adventure Camp | May 17, 2003 | October 25, 2003 | |
| Trading Spaces: Boys vs. Girls | May 17, 2003 | September 2, 2006 | |
| Jeff Corwin Unleashed | September 13, 2003 | September 24, 2005 | |
| Kenny the Shark | November 1, 2003 | September 2, 2006 | |
| Tutenstein | November 1, 2003 | November 19, 2005 | |
| Skunked TV | July 10, 2004 | September 25, 2004 | |
| Darcy's Wild Life | October 2, 2004 | September 2, 2006 | |
| Time Warp Trio | July 9, 2005 | September 2, 2006 | |
| Flight 29 Down | October 1, 2005 | September 2, 2006 | |

== See also ==
- Children's Programming on NBC
- Discovery Kids – a digital cable and satellite channel that operated from 1996 to 2010, and served as the programmer of the Discovery Kids on NBC block.
- Qubo – a successor block to Discovery Kids on NBC, which then became exclusive to both a programming block on Ion Television and a standalone 24-hour digital multicast network until its closure in 2021.
- NBC Kids – children's programming block produced by Sprout that premiered on NBC in July 2012 and ended in September 2016.
- Telemundo Kids – The block consisted of Spanish dubs of various Sony Pictures Television and BRB Internacional series, divided across Sábados de Fantasía ("Fantasy Saturdays") and Domingos de Aventura ("Adventure Sundays") from October 6, 2001, to September 3, 2006.
