= The Cramp Twins =

- Genre: Animated sitcom
- Created by: Brian Wood
- Based on: The Cramp Twins by Brian Wood
- Developed by: Brian Wood; Richard Liebmann-Smith
- Written by: Brian Wood; Andrew Brenner; Sean Veder; Peter Cocks; Ian Carney
- Directed by: Becky Bristow (season 1); Tamara Varga (season 1); Frank Gresham (season 2)
- Starring: Tom Kenny; Kath Soucie; Terry Klassen; Jayne Paterson; Tabitha St. Germain; Nicole Oliver; Ian James Corlett; Colin Murdock; Cathy Weseluck; Lee Tockar; Ellen Kennedy; Iris Quinn; Jay Brazeau
- Theme music composer: Hélène Muddiman
- Composer: Hélène Muddiman
- Countries of origin: Germany; United Kingdom; United States (season 1)
- Original language: English
- No. of seasons: 2
- No. of episodes: 52 (104 segments) (list of episodes)

Production
- Executive producers: Peter Völkle; Ken Olshansky (season 1); Carole Weitzman (season 1); David Ferguson (season 2); Marion Edwards (season 2); Finn Arnesen and Daniel Lennard (for Cartoon Network Europe)
- Producers: Jodey Caminski-Cashman (season 1); Denise Green (season 2)
- Editors: Michael Geisler (season 1); Jim Andrews (season 2); Darren Jones (season 2)
- Running time: 20 minutes (2–10 minute segments)
- Production companies: Sunbow Entertainment (season 1); Telemagination (season 2); TV-Loonland AG (Note: Animation outsourced to RG Prince Films and Loonland Animation.)

Original release
- Network: Cartoon Network
- Release: 3 September 2001 – 2004

The Cramp Twins is an animated television series created by British cartoonist Brian Wood based on his 1995 graphic novel of the same name. The show was produced by Sunbow Entertainment (in season 1), Telemagination (in season 2), and TV-Loonland AG, in association with Cartoon Network Europe.

== Overview ==
The series follows the day-day exploits of Lucien Cramp (Kath Soucie) and Wayne Cramp (Tom Kenny), fraternal twin brothers who live with their germophobic mother Dorothy (Nicole Oliver) and their Western-obsessed father Horace (Ian James Corlett) in the fictional, industrial town of Soap City. Wayne and Lucien's personalities clash, and they hate one another. Wayne has a friend called Dirty Joe (Lee Tockar), who owns a dump, and neighbour Wendy Winkle (Jayne Peterson) has a crush on him, but he despises her. Wayne's and Lucien's teacher is Miss Hillary Hissy (Cathy Weseluck). Lucien's friends include swamp-dweller Tony Parsons (Terry Klassen) and socially-awkward Mari Phelps (Tabitha St. Germain).

Two seasons of The Cramp Twins were made altogether. In the United States, season 1 aired as two separate seasons, and did not get broadcast until long after it had aired in its home country. All episodes were aired 2–3 years earlier in the UK leaving one episode from season 2 (4 in the US) unaired.

== Characters ==
=== Main ===
- Wayne Cramp (voiced by Tom Kenny) – The periwinkle-skinned younger of the twins, but is taller than Lucien.
- Lucien Cramp (voiced by Kath Soucie) – Wayne's older twin brother, as the opening credits indicate. He is the smarter of the twins, and is considered an "eco-nerd".
- Dorothy Cramp (née O'Neil) (voiced by Nicole Oliver) –The twins' strict yellow-skinned mother, and Horace Cramp's wife.
- Horace Cramp (voiced by Ian James Corlett) – The twins' green-skinned and inept father, and Dorothy Cramp's husband.
- Tony Parsons (voiced by Terry Klassen) – Lucien's best friend who is a swamp child.
- Wendy Winkle (voiced by Jayne Paterson) – Walter Winkle's only daughter, who has a huge crush on Wayne that is not reciprocated.
- Mari Phelps (voiced by Tabitha St. Germain) – Lucien's other friend, who often co-operates with Lucien on his environment-conserving efforts, but often can't help desiring a bit of power.

=== Recurring ===
- Dirty Joe Muldoon (voiced by Lee Tockar) – A dim-witted, lonely, middle-aged man who owns the local junkyard frequented by Wayne. He is Wayne's best and only friend. He is an unseen character (except for a hand and part of his clothes).
- Walter Winkle (voiced by Colin Murdock) – Mr. Cramp's boss and Wendy's father. He owns the city's soap-producing factory.
- Miss Hillary Hissy (voiced by Cathy Weseluck) – Wayne's, Lucien's, Wendy's and Mari's oversized teacher.
- Seth Parsons (voiced by Terry Klassen) – Tony's father who is a swamp person.
- Mr. Pretty (voiced by Jay Brazeau) – The overly peppy principal of the school introduced in the show's second season.
- Lillian "Lilly" Parsons (voiced by Pauline Newstone) – Seth's wife and the mother of Tony and his siblings.
- Mrs. Phelps (voiced by Kath Soucie) – Mari's mother. She is the strictest member of her family.
- Mr. Phelps (voiced by Colin Murdock) – Mari's father, who works at the opticians.
- Agent X (voiced by John Payne) – A mysterious and charismatic character portrayed as an FBI agent (or similar).

=== Minor ===
- Mrs. Winkle (voiced by Cathy Weseluck) – Wendy's mother and Walter Winkle's wife. She behaves more or less like her husband, but ignores/denies the fact they're related to swamp people.
- Barber – Dorothy takes Lucien and Wayne to see him, and due to a number of circumstances, ends up shutting down his shop entirely. He appears to dislike and to be scared of Tony, as Tony did not pay his hair shaving fees.
- Rodeo Rita (voiced by Kath Soucie) – A bull rider and country yodeller who turns out to be a fraud. Horace is a big fan of hers, and has a crush on her; the revelation did almost nothing to affect his opinion of her.
- Big Baby – The twins' unnamed female cousin. Although she is five years old, she can barely speak or walk.
- Marsha and Tandy (voiced by Ellen Kennedy and Iris Quinn) – Dorothy's so-called friends. They are often seen arguing or insulting each other and often take delight in Dorothy's domestic misfortunes (i.e. Wayne and/or Lucien embarrassing her, behaving in an unsanitary manner, etc.).

== Production and development ==
The Cramp Twins was developed between Sunbow Entertainment and Cartoon Network Europe during the development of their first co-production Fat Dog Mendoza. The production of the series was announced in July 1999.

In October 2000, Sony Wonder's TV arm was acquired by German company TV-Loonland AG, putting The Cramp Twins under the control of Loonland.

In March 2001, TV-Loonland AG pre-sold the British terrestrial rights to the series to the BBC. In September, the series was pre-sold in Germany to Kika. By late 2001, the series was pre-sold to TF1 in France and Salsa Distribution (a subsidiary of TV-Loonland) pre-sold the series in Latin America to Fox Kids.

In 2002, the series was renewed up for a second season. Telemagination, a British animation studio that TV-Loonland owned, was announced to take over production from Sunbow. By that time, the series had been picked up in over 50 countries worldwide.

== Broadcast ==
The Cramp Twins premiered in the United Kingdom on 3 September 2001 on Cartoon Network and on BBC One during the CBBC programming block, later airing on the CBBC channel itself with the channel's launch in February 2002. The show achieved high popularity with children in the UK, pulling in 1.5 million viewers a week on CBBC and becoming the top-rated weekend series on Cartoon Network during its initial broadcast. After the series ended, reruns continued to air on CBBC and Cartoon Network for a few years afterwards, with Cartoon Network airing the show well into the mid-2010s at night, in order to fill European content requirements alongside Skatoony and Robotboy. It was also repeated on Boomerang UK and Cartoon Network Too.

In early 2003, 4Kids Entertainment acquired exclusive merchandise licensing, television broadcast and home video rights for the series within the United States. The series premiered in the U.S. on the company's FoxBox Saturday morning block on Fox on 8 February on the same year. It would continue to air on the block at various intervals until 19 August 2006. The series also aired on Cartoon Network in the U.S. from 14 June 2004 to April 2005.

In Canada, the series aired on YTV, premiering in 2004.

== Home media ==
=== United Kingdom ===
In the UK, the series was released on DVD (with Volume 1 also released on VHS) by Metrodome Distribution, a home video company that TV-Loonland AG majority-owned at the time. Volumes 4 and 5 were released under the distributor's "Mini Metro" budget range.

All episodes released on DVD in the country made up the entirety of Series 1. Volume 5 also includes a Season 2 episode.

DVD title	Release date	Included episodes
Mr. Winkle's Monkey & Other Stories (DVD & VHS)	United Kingdom: 17 February 2003	"Fashion Passion / Small Wonder"; "Mr. Winkle's Monkey / Wicked Wendy"; "Swamp Fever / Kung Foolish"; "Silence Please / Fur Fungus"; "Home on the Range / Holesome"
Haircut Horrors & Other Stories (DVD)	United Kingdom: 15 May 2006	"Date Dupe / Agent X"; "Sick Daze / Picket Picket"; "Nostalgia Nasty / Haircut Horrors"; "Big Baby / Ad Bad"; "Workout / Sixth Senselessness"; "Twin Studies / Birthday Blues"
Wolfman Wayne & Other Stories (DVD)	United Kingdom: 15 May 2006	"Grandma's Piano / Guide Games"; "Prize Swallow / Ice Scream"; "Wolfman Wayne / Shed Dead"; "Spy's Pies / No Means Yes"; "Miss Kissy / Friend Fight"; "Walk Like A Man / Bouncy Bob"
Dirty Monkey & Other Stories (DVD)	United Kingdom: 9 October 2006	"Room Rage / Dirty Monkey"; "Hotel Hysteria / Alien Glow"; "Chameleon Chaos / Weedkiller"; "The Great Luciani / Wendy Boy"; "Food Fight / Mari Mania"
Pantaloonacy & Other Stories (DVD)	United Kingdom: 26 February 2007	"Great Bowl of Fear / Mud Crush"; "Petrified Poodles / Harp Wars"; "The Bad Seed / Rodeo Rita"; "Worm Funeral / One Sock Wonder"; "Pantaloonacy / Girl Gang"

"Sick Daze / Picket Picket" was also featured on a compilation VHS and DVD called "Boys Stuff" from 2004 which also featured episodes from The Transformers, G.I. Joe: A Real American Hero, Yvon of the Yukon and Super Duper Sumos.

=== United States ===
In the United States, two DVDs containing 11 segments each were released on DVD by Platinum Disc and 4Kids Home Video.

The first, "Twin-Compatible", was released on 19 April 2005, and the other, "Twin-Sult", was released on 10 March 2006.

== Ratings ==
- Wednesday 20 February 2002 - 60,000 (2nd most watched on CBBC that week)
- Friday 15 March 2002 - 40,000 (8th most watched on CBBC that week)
- Thursday 21 March 2002 - 40,000 (3rd most watched on CBBC that week)
- Thursday 28 March 2002 - 60,000 (most watched on CBBC that week)
- Tuesday 26 March 2002 - 40,000 (6th most watched on CBBC that week)
- Monday 15 April 2002 - 30,000 (4th most watched on CBBC that week)

== Award nominations ==
- BAFTA Children's Awards 2002
  - Nominated for Best Animation
