= 4Kids TV =

Former American children's programming block

- "The Game Station" logo used from September 8, 2007 to December 27, 2008
- Network: Fox
- Launched: September 14, 2002
- Closed: December 27, 2008
- Country of origin: United States
- Owner: News Corporation; 4Kids Entertainment
- Headquarters: New York City, United States
- Formerly known as: FoxBox (2002–2005)
- Original language: English
- Voices of: Mike Pollock (2002–2005)

4Kids TV (often stylized as 4K!DSTV, branded on-screen as 4Kids TV: The Game Station from September 8, 2007 to December 27, 2008, and formerly known as FoxBox from September 14, 2002 to January 15, 2005) was an American television programming block and internet-based video on demand children's network operated by News Corporation and 4Kids Entertainment. It originated as a weekly block on Saturday mornings on the Fox network, which was created out of a four-year agreement reached on January 22, 2002, between 4Kids Entertainment and Fox to lease the four-hour Saturday morning time slot occupied by the network's existing children's program block, Fox Kids. It was targeted at children aged 7–11. The 4Kids TV block was part of the Fox network schedule, although it was syndicated to other broadcast television stations in certain markets where a Fox affiliate declined to air it.

== History ==
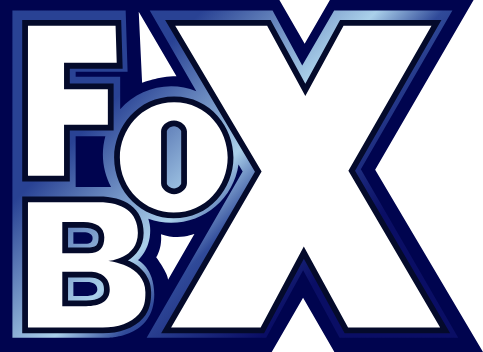
The "FoxBox" logo used from September 14, 2002 to January 15, 2005

The block aired a preview special on September 1, 2002, and was formally launched on September 14, 2002, under the name FoxBox, a joint venture between News Corporation and 4Kids Entertainment, replacing Fox Kids, which the network announced it would discontinue as a result of the 2001 purchase of Fox Family Worldwide by The Walt Disney Company (which resulted in much of the content featured on the block moving to Disney's networks and blocks). The block was rebranded as 4Kids TV on January 22, 2005. 4Kids Entertainment was fully responsible for the content of the block and collected all of the advertising revenue accrued from it. However, Fox's standards and practices department still handled content approval and responsibility of editing the series to meet FCC broadcast standards."Fox Box (October 12, 2002)".

The programming block aired on Saturday mornings in most areas of the United States, though stations who already had a Saturday morning block (usually one from other minor networks said station affiliated with, namely Kids' WB) would instead air the block on Sundays. On October 2, 2007, 4Kids Entertainment announced it would program a competing Saturday morning lineup for The CW, the new block, The CW4Kids (later renamed Toonzai, with the original name becoming a secondary brand), premiered on May 24, 2008, replacing the Kids' WB programming block, which had been carried over to The CW from one of its predecessors, The WB, when it launched on September 23, 2006. The block was renamed as Toonzai on August 14, 2010, and continued to air until it ended August 18, 2012, being replaced by Vortexx a week later and the block continued to air until it ended on September 27, 2014.

On November 10, 2008, 4Kids Entertainment announced that 4Kids TV would conclude at the end of the year due to intervening conflicts between Fox and 4Kids, as the latter company had not paid the network for the time lease for some time, while the network was unable to maintain the guaranteed 90% clearance for the block due to affiliate refusals and an inability to secure secondary affiliates to carry the programming in markets where the Fox station denied clearance for the block. 4Kids TV ended on December 27, 2008, ending Fox's nearly two-decade commitment to children's animation programming. Fox announced that the four-hour time period would no longer be used for children's programming, owing that it was no longer viable due to the insurmountable competition from children's cable channels (such as Nickelodeon, Cartoon Network, and Disney Channel). On January 3, 2009, the network gave two hours of the programming time that the 4Kids TV block occupied back to its affiliates, while the other two hours would be retained by the network for a paid programming block titled Weekend Marketplace, which replaced 4Kids TV on January 3, 2009. The 4KidsTV logo now only exists as the closing logo for 4Kids Entertainment for shows produced by the company distributed outside of the United States (particularly those made before the 2012 auction of most of 4Kids' assets to Saban Brands)."4KIDS TV".

Fox would reverse course and indirectly resume airing children's programming for the first time since 4Kids TV ended through an agreement announced on December 17, 2013, when it signed a deal with Steve Rotfeld Productions to launch Xploration Station, a two-hour block of live-action educational programs focused on the STEM fields, which debuted on September 13, 2014. As the block accounts for two of the three weekly hours of educational programming required by the Federal Communications Commission's Children's Television Act, the Fox affiliates that opted against airing 4Kids TV, Fox Kids, or Weekend Marketplace (including those owned by the network that were acquired through its 1996 merger with New World Communications and those acquired through that deal that were owned by Tribune Broadcasting, now Nexstar Media Group) elected to run Xploration Station as it is an E/I-compliant lineup syndicated primarily to the network's affiliates, relieving them of taking on the full burden of purchasing educational programming aimed at children from the syndication market (although some Fox stations, including those owned by the Sinclair Broadcast Group—the vast majority of its stations had carried Fox's previous children's blocks, decided to decline the block anyway due to existing commitments to syndicated programs compliant with Children's Television Act recommendations).

As of 2024, some former 4Kids TV shows (such as Chaotic (only in Spanish), Dinosaur King, G.I. Joe: Sigma 6, Sonic X, and various entries in the Yu-Gi-Oh! franchise) are made available to stream via the free ad-supported Tubi streaming service, which launched on April 1, 2014, and was later acquired by Fox Corporation (which had recently been spun off from 21st Century Fox following that company's acquisition by Disney one year prior in March 2019) on April 20, 2020. Sonic X is also available on Amazon Prime Video, Hulu, Pluto TV, and Crackle respectively, though the latter service only carries seasons 1 and 2. Netflix also carried the first two seasons of Sonic X between December 2019 and December 2024, and again since December 2025. In addition, Teenage Mutant Ninja Turtles is made available to stream on both the free ad-supported Pluto TV and subscription-based Paramount+ streaming services owned by Paramount Skydance following that property's 2009 acquisition by Nickelodeon, while various entries in the Yu-Gi-Oh! franchise and the English-language version of Chaotic are on NBCUniversal's Peacock streaming service. Winx Club is available on services like Toon Goggles, YouTube, and Amazon Prime Video, but the Canadian English Cinélume dub is used instead of the 4Kids Entertainment dub. Similarly, One Piece is also available on modern streaming services like Netflix, but it uses modern dubs instead.

== Programming ==
=== Former programming ===
==== FoxBox ====
===== Original programming =====
Title	Premiere date	End date	Source(s)
Ultraman Tiga	September 14, 2002	March 1, 2003	
Kirby: Right Back at Ya! ‡	September 14, 2002	January 15, 2005	
Ultimate Muscle ‡	September 14, 2002	May 22, 2004	
Fighting Foodons	September 14, 2002	August 30, 2003	
Teenage Mutant Ninja Turtles ‡	February 8, 2003	January 15, 2005	
WMAC Masters	July 5, 2003	August 30, 2003	
Sonic X ‡	August 23, 2003	January 15, 2005	
Funky Cops	August 23, 2003	July 3, 2004	
Shaman King ‡	August 30, 2003	January 15, 2005	
Cubix: Robots for Everyone^{E/I}	September 6, 2003	June 12, 2004	
Winx Club^{E/I} ‡	May 22, 2004	January 15, 2005	
F-Zero GP Legend ‡	September 4, 2004	January 15, 2005	
One Piece ‡	September 18, 2004	January 15, 2005	

===== Acquired programming =====
Title	Premiere date	End date	Source(s)
Stargate Infinity (Note: FoxBox/4Kids TV is named in the credits but did not directly produce the show.)^{E/I}	September 14, 2002	March 15, 2003	
The Cramp Twins (Note: Although acquired, 4Kids was the exclusive license and merchandising holder for the series in the United States.) ‡	February 8, 2003	November 15, 2003	
The Cramp Twins ‡	September 18, 2004	January 15, 2005	
Pirate Islands	March 8, 2003	August 2, 2003	
Back to the Future^{E/I}	March 22, 2003	August 30, 2003	
Martin Mystery	May 8, 2004	June 19, 2004	
The Menu ‡	June 5, 2004	September 11, 2004	

‡ - Program transitioned to 4Kids TV

==== 4Kids TV ====
===== Original programming =====
Title	Premiere date	End date	Source(s)
Kirby: Right Back at Ya! †	January 22, 2005	August 6, 2005	
Kirby: Right Back at Ya! †	July 8, 2006	January 6, 2007	
Kirby: Right Back at Ya! †	June 21, 2008	December 27, 2008	
Teenage Mutant Ninja Turtles †	January 22, 2005	December 27, 2008	
One Piece †	January 22, 2005	November 12, 2005	
Shaman King †	January 22, 2005	September 3, 2005	
Winx Club^{E/I} †	January 22, 2005	December 27, 2008	
F-Zero GP Legend †	January 22, 2005	March 5, 2005	
Sonic X †	January 22, 2005	June 3, 2006	
Sonic X †	May 5, 2007	December 27, 2008	
Mew Mew Power	February 19, 2005	July 22, 2006	
Magical DoReMi^{E/I}	August 13, 2005	August 19, 2006	
G.I. Joe: Sigma 6	August 27, 2005	December 30, 2006	
Ultimate Muscle †	June 10, 2006	August 19, 2006	
Viva Piñata	August 26, 2006	August 2, 2008	
Yu-Gi-Oh!	September 2, 2006	August 25, 2007	
Yu-Gi-Oh! Capsule Monsters	September 9, 2006	November 25, 2006	
Chaotic	October 7, 2006	December 27, 2008	
Yu-Gi-Oh! GX	September 1, 2007	June 14, 2008	
Dinosaur King	September 8, 2007	September 6, 2008	
The Adrenaline Project^{E/I}	September 29, 2007	April 5, 2008	

===== Acquired programming =====
Title	Premiere date	End date	Source(s)
The Cramp Twins †	January 22, 2005	February 12, 2005	
The Cramp Twins †	June 10, 2006	August 19, 2006	
Alien Racers	May 7, 2005	July 23, 2005	
The Menu †	July 9, 2005	August 27, 2005	
Bratz	August 20, 2005	April 7, 2007	
Di-Gata Defenders	July 28, 2007	December 27, 2008	
Biker Mice from Mars	August 9, 2008	December 27, 2008	

† - Program transitioned from FoxBox

== 4KidsTV.com ==
=== Online network ===
4Kids launched an online video player on its website on September 8, 2007, and gradually added full-length episodes as well as additional video clips and online-exclusive content.

== Relationship with Fox and broadcast ambiguities ==
The block had a somewhat infrequent relationship to the Fox network. The programming was produced for Fox and offered to the network's owned-and-operated stations and affiliates first, so the Fox station in any given area had the right of first refusal. In the event that a Fox affiliate or in some cases, an O&O of the network—opted not to carry 4Kids TV, the block then became available for the local broadcast rights to be acquired by another television station. In fact, it was due in part to these carriage ambiguities that 4Kids dissolved the block in 2008, as they had been promised clearance on at least 90% of Fox's stations.

Most of Fox's owned-and-operated stations opted to carry 4Kids TV (these were mainly stations that had been owned by the network since Fox launched in October 1986 or were Fox charter affiliates that Fox Television Stations had acquired since that point). However dating back to the existence of the Fox Kids block, the twelve stations that Fox acquired from New World Communications in 1996 (and had earlier affiliated with the network through a 1994 multi-station affiliation deal—which prior to then, had been affiliated with ABC, NBC, or CBS) generally did not air 4Kids TV. In some of the New World markets, 4Kids was not carried on any station. In a majority of these markets, an independent station carried the block; in others, it was carried by either a WB or UPN affiliate, and later a MyNetworkTV or CW affiliate. The only exception was in St. Louis, Missouri, where Fox O&O (now affiliate) KTVI carried the block (although it aired 4Kids TV two hours earlier than the network's recommended scheduling for the block, beginning at 5:00 a.m., due to the station's Saturday morning newscast).

Some of 4Kids TV's programming (such as Winx Club, The Adrenaline Project, Magical DoReMi, Stargate Infinity, reruns of Back to the Future: the Animated Series, and Cubix) met the criteria to be considered educational and informational under the requirements defined by the Children's Television Act, and counted toward the three-hour-per-week mandatory educational children's programming quotas outlined by the Federal Communications Commission.

=== Markets where 4Kids TV did not run ===
City of license/market	Fox station	Notes
Birmingham, Alabama	WBRC	Station never had interest in carrying Fox children's programming and alternate Fox Kids programming affiliate WTTO (channel 21) dropped it in fall 1999.
Greensboro/Winston-Salem/ High Point, North Carolina	WGHP	Station never had interest in carrying Fox children's programming and alternate Fox Kids programming affiliate WTWB (channel 20) dropped it in early 2001.
Greenwood, Mississippi	WABG-DT2	Digital subchannel newly launched in 2006 after the cable-only service Foxnet was phased out and started only carrying Fox primetime and sports programming due to a lack of syndicated programming, especially in mornings, so WABG also declined to carry weekend morning programming, including 4KidsTV.

=== Markets where 4Kids TV ran on a MyNetworkTV affiliate ===
City of license/market	Fox station	MyNetworkTV station carrying block
Chicago, Illinois	WFLD	WPWR-TV
Dallas-Fort Worth, Texas	KDFW	KDFI
Detroit, Michigan	WJBK	WDWB/WMYD
Miami, Florida	WSVN	WBFS-TV
Minneapolis-St. Paul, Minnesota	KMSP-TV	WFTC
Portland, Oregon	KPTV	KPDX
San Antonio, Texas	KABB	KMYS
Tucson, Arizona	KMSB-TV	KTTU

=== Markets where 4Kids TV ran on a CW affiliate ===
Note: These CW affiliates ran 4Kids TV on Sundays, due to their obligation to carry their primary network's children's lineup on Saturday as scheduled.

City of license/market	Fox station	CW station carrying block
Atlanta, Georgia	WAGA-TV	WUPA
Cleveland, Ohio	WJW-TV	WBNX-TV
Fresno, California	KMPH-TV	KFRE-TV
Omaha, Nebraska	KPTM	KXVO
Phoenix, Arizona	KSAZ-TV	KASW

=== Markets where 4Kids TV ran on an independent station ===
City of license/market	Fox station	Independent carrying block
Austin, Texas	KTBC	K13VC
Kansas City, Missouri	WDAF-TV	KMCI-TV
Milwaukee, Wisconsin	WITI	WMLW-CA
Tampa, Florida	WTVT	WMOR-TV

== See also ==
- 4Kids Entertainment
- Toonzai – children's program block produced by 4Kids for The CW from May 24, 2008 to August 18, 2012.
