= Kenny the Shark =

American animated television series

- Genre: Animated series Comedy
- Created by: Jim Jenkins; Jack Huber
- Written by: Jay Martel; Philip Morton; Don Wells; Tim Hill
- Directed by: George Engelbrecht
- Voices of: Jim Conroy; Kelli Rabke; Karen Culp; Russell Horton; Nicolas King; Rob Bartlett
- Theme music composer: PFFR
- Composer: Jared Faber
- Country of origin: United States
- Original language: English
- No. of seasons: 2
- No. of episodes: 26 (52 segments)

Production
- Executive producers: Bob Mittenthal; Winnie Chaffee; Peter Roos
- Producer: Kaluska Poventud
- Running time: 22 minutes (30 with commercials)
- Production company: Phase 4

Original release
- Network: NBC (Discovery Kids on NBC); Discovery Kids
- Release: November 1, 2003 – February 19, 2005

Kenny the Shark is an American animated television series produced by Discovery Kids. The series premiered on Discovery Kids' Saturday morning block on NBC on November 1, 2003, and ended on February 19, 2005, spanning two seasons and 26 episodes in total having aired. The series is about an anthropomorphic tiger shark named Kenny, who was tired of being a predator, and wanted to live with a suburban family.

== Production ==
Kenny the Shark was not Kenny's first appearance. In the late 1990s, a series of shorts featuring Kenny ran between regular programming. In the live-action film version, it starred male child actor Spencer Breslin. Kenny was not seen, as the camera was from his point of view. Unlike most animated television shows which take place in fictional cities or states, etc., this one takes place in the real-life town of Tiburon, California.

== Theme music ==
The series' theme music was performed by PFFR, who would later produce MTV2's Wonder Showzen and Adult Swim's Xavier: Renegade Angel.

== Characters ==
=== Main ===
- Kenny (voiced by Jim Conroy) is a sarcastic tiger shark. He is a comical character with a happy-go-lucky attitude who was tired of life in the ocean and went to live on the surface, where he is able to walk on his tail fins and breathe air like humans. In some cases, he can't control himself when he hears or sees a seal. He lives with Kat and her family, and likes eating chum, fish, seal pops, seals and sushi. Like most anthropomorphic animals, Kenny is able to walk, using his tail fins as feet. While he's usually depicted as speaking English, he actually speaks a shark language that only Kat can understand.
- Katarina "Kat" Cassidy (voiced by Kelli Rabke) is a young school student who is the only one who speaks in Kenny's language. She is obsessed with sharks, is Kenny's owner and best friend, is optimistic and fun-loving, and possesses rather unrealistic characteristics. She usually wears sandals like her parents, but later in the series she wears tennis shoes. In the episode "I Love the Nightlife", it is revealed that her real name is Katarina. In "Goodbye, Ol' Chum", she turns 11.
- Karl Cassidy (voiced by Karen Culp) is Kat's youngest brother. He thinks that Kenny is a dog, despite it being clear that he's a shark. He is 1 1/2 years old.
- Grace Cassidy (voiced by Karen Culp) is Kat and Karl's mother, Peter's wife, and Grandma Pat's daughter-in-law. She is a psychiatrist and runs her practice at her house. She is always kind and caring and she loves Kat, Karl, Kenny and her husband equally. Kenny sometimes accidentally scares off her patients, such as Mr. Luskerfish.
- Peter Cassidy (voiced by Russell Horton) is Kat and Karl's father, Grace's husband, and Grandma Pat's son. He is an eco-sensitive hippie who owns a healthy grocery store. He gives Kat and Grace nicknames related to fruits and vegetables. He doesn't like Kenny because of his constant eating, shedding his teeth, and his tendency to break public property which costs him in fines. In the first season, Peter's hair is blond, but in the second season, his hair is brown.

=== Supporting ===
- Oscar (voiced by Nicolas King) is Kat's best human friend. He is obsessed with the Mayans, from whom he is descended.
- The Phoebes are a group of three popular girls that share the same name. Kat tries to be friends with them, but soon realizes they are mean, rude and sarcastic. They become Kat's rivals and refer to her as a "sea dweeb" because she likes sharks. They once "stole" the lead drummer for Kat and Oscar's band, whom Kenny replaced. At first, they are afraid of Kenny, but they like him for his cuteness after seeing a film called Finding Nimoy (a parody of Disney-Pixar's 2003 film Finding Nemo) about a baby shark named Nimoy on a journey to return to his parents. They are a parody of the Heathers.
- Burton Plushtoy III (voiced by Oliver Wyman) is a British obnoxious rich English-accented kid and one of Kat's rivals. He wants Kenny to be in his own private collection of exotic pets. He has been foiled by Kat twice. He looks very much like Richie Rich, who is also a rich kid.
- Merkins is Plushtoy's British-accented butler and henchman when trying to kidnap Kenny.
- Marty (voiced by Rob Bartlett) is a dachshund and Kenny's other best friend who occasionally gives Kenny advice. Kat seems to understand Marty as much as she understands Kenny. Marty bears a resemblance to his human owner.
- Elly (voiced by Amy Love) is a bull shark from the aquarium, on whom Kenny has a crush. She appreciates Kenny being himself, and doesn't like him when he's not. After Marty helps save her from becoming sushi, she is shown batting her eyes at him when Kenny was going to bring her flowers. He throws them in the trash and leaves the aquarium. She is not seen or spoken of outside these two episodes.
- Captain Ahearn is the local, somewhat insane sailor captain who thinks all sharks are dangerous and tried to catch Kenny and kill him thinking that he is trying to protect Kat. After Kenny saved him from guard dogs, only because Kat commanded him to, they all become friends. He helps Kat and Kenny sometimes, and they helped him with a sleep-walking problem once in "Over the Ocean".
- Brock is a local muscular former paperboy who appears to be a few years older than Kat. Like Kat, Brock also plays soccer. She used to crush on him, making her lose attention to Kenny. Jealous, Kenny scares Brock away twice, entirely on Marty's recommendation. He quits his job, thinking that he is under pressure. When the new paperboy, Larry, informs Kat about this, she spirals into depression, and Kenny tells her what he did. He insists to make it up to Kat, who says "I doubt it," even though she deserves to make it up to him, for ignoring him. When she learns that Brock already has a girlfriend, she impulsively lies to him about being in a relationship with Larry. She apologizes to Kenny, and a teenage boy comes to fix the pool. Kat falls in love with him, and Marty says, "I've seen this before."
- Grandma Pat Cassidy is Kat and Karl's paternal grandmother, Peter's mother, and Grace's mother-in-law. She loves Kenny. In the episode "All You Can Eat", Kenny takes advantage of her for feeding him.
- Lola is Marty's girlfriend as seen in "Kenny in Love".
- Mr. Luskerfish is a psychiatrist who appeared in "Simply Irresistible".
- Dr. Flossmore is the neighborhood dentist as seen in "The Check Up". His last name is a parody on how he wants kids to "floss more". He has a bad eyeglasses prescription, causing him to mistake Kenny for Kat, Kat for Karl, and a water fountain for Grace. He is 47 years old.
- Ms. Hattie is an ill-tempered elder seen in "Naughty Naughty Kenny" who seems nice at first, but then becomes "bad to the bone".
- Gezabelle is Ms. Hattie's pet cat seen in "Naughty Naughty Kenny".
- Buster is a fierce-looking killer whale with a temperament to match. He thinks lowly of Kenny, and has him do his bidding by threatening to swallow him.

== Episodes ==
=== Season 1 (2003–04) ===
No.	Title	Original release date
1	"Simply Irresistible/Special Delivery"	November 1, 2003
2	"Kid's Menu/Will Work for Chum"	November 8, 2003
3	"I Love the Nightlife/Dolphin for a Day"	December 6, 2003
4	"Two Days of the Parrot/My Old School"	December 13, 2003
5	"Bill Me Later/Catscratch Fever"	January 3, 2004
6	"Kenny the Veggie/Watching Karl"	January 10, 2004
7	"The Check Up/Naughty, Naughty Kenny"	January 17, 2004
8	"Pet Tricks/Who Framed Kenny the Shark?"	January 24, 2004
9	"Three to Tango/Ball of Contention"	January 31, 2004
10	"He's Gotta Have It/Kat and the Sax"	February 7, 2004
11	"Trash Talking/Kenny in Love"	February 14, 2004
12	"Fish Tale/Father's Day"	February 21, 2004
13	"Family Vacation/Gentle Ken"	February 28, 2004

=== Season 2 (2004–05) ===
No.	Title	Original release date
14	"Kenny the Hero/Whaling on Kenny"	March 2, 2004
15	"His Fate Is Sealed/Surf's Up"	March 9, 2004
16	"Regime Change/Boy Trouble"	March 30, 2004
17	"Kenny-napped/Kenny the Dad"	April 13, 2004
18	"Kenny the Movie/Goodbye, Ol' Chum"	April 27, 2004
19	"Kenny the Star/Shark Shrunk"	May 4, 2004
20	"Ocean's Three/Antiques Roadshark"	May 15, 2004
21	"Mr. Popularity/How to Succeed in Business"	October 1, 2004
22	"Over the Ocean/A Dog's Life"	October 22, 2004
23	"Nobody Move/Seasick"	November 19, 2004
24	"Kenny the Rockstar/Scaredy-Shark"	February 4, 2005
25	"Revenge of the Shark Nerd/Bed and Breakfast"	February 11, 2005
26	"Lawn Shark/All You Can Eat"	February 19, 2005

== Home media ==
The series was released on DVD in the United States by Genius Products and Discovery Home Entertainment with 2 volumes in 2007, and a third volume in 2008.

Three DVD volumes from Magna Pacific in Australia entitled "First Bite" (with 10 short episodes), "Second Bite" (with 8 short episodes) and "Third Bite" (with 8 short episodes) were released in 2005.

The first 10 episodes became available for purchase in the United States on the iTunes Store in 2009.
