= List of Endurance episodes =

- For more information about the teams and seasons, see main article: Endurance (TV series)

== Series overview ==
Season	Episodes	Originally released	
Season	Episodes	First released	Last released
1	13	October 5, 2002	February 22, 2003
2	14	September 27, 2003	February 28, 2004
3	18	September 25, 2004	February 19, 2005
4	14	October 1, 2005	March 25, 2006
5	14	October 14, 2006	March 17, 2007
6	12	October 13, 2007	March 8, 2008

== Season 1: California (2002–03) ==
The following episodes are the episode list for Endurance. Episode seven, fifteen, and sixteen are specials. The seventh episode recaps the events of the first six days of the competition. The fifteenth and the sixteenth episodes reunites the cast nearly one year since the series has started.

No.	Title	Original release date
1	"Right to Stay"	October 5, 2002
2	"Fate Falls"	October 12, 2002
3	"Tilt"	October 19, 2002
4	"Knotted Up"	October 26, 2002
5	"Plant the Flag"	November 16, 2002
6	"Squeeze Play"	November 23, 2002
Special	"The First Six Days"	November 30, 2002
7	"Water Logged"	December 7, 2002
8	"Eruption"	December 14, 2002
9	"House of Cards"	January 4, 2003
10	"Dial In"	January 11, 2003
11	"Build a Pyramid"	January 18, 2003
12	"Leap of Fate"	January 25, 2003
13	"Don't Drop the Ball"	February 22, 2003
Special	"Reunion"	September 13, 2003 - September 20, 2003
Special	"Best of Endurance: California"	March 4, 2006

=== Episode description ===
==== Right to Stay ====
In the series premiere, 20 strangers arrive on an island somewhere in the Pacific Ocean, where they meet the host, J.D. Roth, who explains the rules to them: every day, there will be a mission that will give one of seven teams a Pyramid Piece, an important item needed to win the game (the pieces are Courage, Heart, Knowledge, Leadership, Commitment, Perseverance, Trust, Discipline, Strength, and Luck), and the following day features a Temple Mission, which gives the winning team a chance to send two other teams to the Temple of Fate, where one team is eliminated. But first, the competitors must compete for the right to stay on the island, and by the end of the day, 6 of the 20 strangers will be eliminated before the game even begins. In the challenge, called Timeline, they have to hold onto two rings while their ankles are held up by bungee cords. The first 3 girls and guys to let go are automatically eliminated. In the end, Shane Peltzman, Ron Newrauter, Alejandro Rose-Garcia, Lacey Elick, Heather Ichihashi, and Cree Howard are eliminated, leaving 14 players to compete in the game, where the grand prize is of their choice.

==== Fate Falls ====
The 14 Endurance players compete in the partner selection challenge, where a colored ball representing the 7 team colors (red, orange, yellow, green, blue, purple, and gray) will drop from a match stick- like pyramid. The person who catches the ball chooses the guy and girl for that colored team. Jon Crocilla and Sabrina Lloyd become the Yellow Team, Aaron Thornburg and Jonna Mannion become the Blue Team, Christian Justice and Ashley Gudzak become the Red Team, Trevor Wilkins and Lana Neiman become the Green Team (even though Trevor was originally to be paired with Chelsea Myers), Brandon Hendrix (who was originally to be paired with Lana) and Layla Brisco become the Purple Team, Skyler Russell (who was originally to be partnered with Layla) and Chelsea becoming the Orange Team, leaving Max DeLeo and Jenna Jimenez as the Gray Team. Later, the team chooses their Pyramid Pieces: Perseverance (Yellow), Courage (Blue), Leadership (Red), Commitment (Green), Strength (Purple), Luck (Orange), and Heart and Trust (Gray). The teams then choose their grand prize trips: Belize (Yellow), Africa (Blue), Australia (Red), the Amazon (Green), Costa Rica (Purple), Bali and Komodo (Orange), and the Galapagos Islands (Gray), and the game begins...

==== Tilt ====
The 7 teams compete in their first Endurance mission: one member of each team is harnessed to a pole on a platform and must hold on to their partners. The winning team is the team that manages to hold on the longest. In the end, the Blue Team comes out on top, receiving the Knowledge and Discipline Pyramid Pieces, and control over the Samadhi, which will allow them to handicap another team, which will leave them at a heavy disadvantage in the first Temple Mission. The Red, Yellow, and Gray Teams form an alliance to go against The Brotherhood, an alliance consisting of the Blue, Orange, Green, and Purple Teams. However, at The Rock, the season's official meeting place, the Blue Team betrays their own alliance by giving the Samadhi to the Orange Team. They crack the Samadhi open, revealing a rope with 3 knots in it...

==== Knotted Up ====
In the first ever Temple Mission, the teams have to untie a huge knot in their team-colored rope, and the first team to do so wins. Because they got the Samadhi, the Orange Team has 3 additional knots to untie. In the end, the Blue Team scores a second consecutive victory. In order to get rid of the Green Team (because Trevor has begun to annoy everybody), the Blue Team sends the Gray Team up along with them, hoping that the Green Team will be sent home. Shockingly, the plan backfires and the Gray Team is the first to be eliminated.

==== Plant the Flag ====
The six remaining teams are shocked when the Blue Team receives a note from the Gray Team, accusing them of betrayal. Once this is cleared up, the teams compete in their next challenge: the players on both teams are connected by a pulley system; while one member plants one of five flags onto their team triangle, the other member retrieves the next one. The winning team receives the Gray Team's Heart and Trust pieces, the Samadhi, and the option to trade their trip for the Gray Team's. The Yellow Team wins, but they decide to keep their trip to Belize. Lana learns that Trevor has told the others about what happens at the Temple of Fate, so she tries to cover up the secrets. After taking a surprise survey at The Rock, the Yellow Team gives the Samadhi to the Purple Team, which contains a note that forbids them from competing in the next Temple Mission.

==== Squeeze Play ====
With the Purple Team banned from the Temple Mission, the five other teams are left to compete. Based on the survey taken the previous night, they have to show their answers via colored rocks. Every time a player gets a question right, they move up farther into a pyramid. As they play, teams will be squeezed out, and the winner is whoever can get all of the questions right and reach the top. In the end, the Red Team scores a victory and they choose to send the weakened Purple Team, along with the Orange Team, to the Temple of Fate. After Layla and Chelsea spend some time together, both teams went up to the Temple, where the Purple Team becomes the second team to be eliminated.

==== The First Six Days ====
A recap special of the first six episodes, with deleted scenes, and a preview of the remaining seven episodes shown at the end.

==== Waterlogged ====
The teams compete in their third Endurance mission, where one member of each team holds onto a rope attached to a huge bucket, while the other players put water in them, in hopes of making the bucket heavy for one team and forcing them off the platforms that they are standing on, which will make them lose. The winner receives the Purple Team's Strength piece, the Samadhi, and the option to trade their trip for a chance to go to Costa Rica. Despite Lana's best efforts, the Yellow Team scores their second victory, but they once again decide to keep their trip to Belize. The alliance between the Red, Yellow, and Blue Teams (formed after the Gray Team was eliminated) began to falter as Ashley targets the Blue Team for their pieces and Sabrina considers giving the Samadhi to the Red Team. Ultimately, the Orange Team gets the Samadhi for a second time, and the handicap is that 1 foot of their rope will be cut in the next Temple Mission.

==== Eruption ====
The teams have to hold onto ropes attached to some water balloons, and the winner is whoever can hold on the longest without letting go, which will release the balloons. Because they got the Samadhi, exactly 1 foot of the Orange Team's rope is cut. In the end, the Blue Team wins yet another mission, but due to some manipulation from Sabrina, the Blue Team spares the Yellow Team and sends the Green and Orange Teams to the Temple of Fate, each for a second time. At the Temple, despite depending on their Luck piece, the Orange Team becomes the third team to leave the island.

==== House of Cards ====
In honor of those who built the Great Wall of China, the teams build their own walls, with chocolate acting as cement. The catch? The boys on all teams are buried in sand and have to hold their walls up, while the girls have to build them. In the end, the Green Team wins and receives the Orange Team's Luck piece, but they decide to keep their trip to the Amazon, instead of trading it for Komodo. Meanwhile, Ashley learns that Sabrina is turning against her, but they eventually learn that friendship is more important, and thus, they stick together. At The Rock, the Blue Team is given the Samadhi, which will give them a 15-second disadvantage in the next Temple Mission.

==== Dial In ====
The final 4 teams must crack a decrypted question (which team left Endurance first) and then give the right answer (Gray Team). Despite being forced to wait 15 seconds before starting due to the Samadhi handicap, the Blue Team still manages to score another victory. Later, they shock everyone when they decide to send the Yellow Team (because Aaron has found out Sabrina lied about having a crush on him), along with the Green Team, to the Temple of Fate, and Sabrina vows revenge if she returns. At the Temple, despite having the Orange Team's Luck Piece, the Green Team becomes the fourth team to leave the island.

==== Build a Pyramid ====
As the title suggests, the final three teams must use different shaped pieces to build a pyramid, and the winner receives the Samadhi, the Luck and Commitment pieces left behind by the Green Team, and the option to trade their trip for the Amazon. The powerful Blue Team wins for a sixth time, and decides to trade their trip to Africa for the Amazon. At The Rock, they give the Samadhi to the Yellow Team, but when given the decision to remove it, they pull it completely out of the game, creating a level playing field for the final Temple Mission.

==== Leap of Fate ====
The final 3 play in their last Temple Mission, where they must jump over their team-colored bars as they swing down at them. Whichever team can jump the longest will guarantee themselves a spot in the final two, while the other teams are automatically sent to the Temple of Fate. The Blue Team manages to score their last victory before the final challenge, and the Red Team becomes the last team to leave the island.

==== Don't Drop the Ball ====
Before heading to the Temple of Fate, the Yellow and Blue Teams compete for the Red Team's Leadership piece and their trip to Australia. They must hold up a huge ball and whoever drops it or lets the ball touch their heads loses. The Yellow Team wins, but turn down the chance to visit Australia. Going into the final competition, both teams are tied with five pieces (Blue has their Courage piece, the Knowledge piece, the Discipline piece, Green's Commitment piece and Orange's Luck piece; Yellow has their Perseverance piece, Gray's Trust piece, Gray's Heart piece, Purple's Strength piece and Red's Leadership piece). At the Temple of Fate, both teams compete in the final challenge, where the Blue Team wins it all and becomes the first ever Endurance champions.

==== Reunion ====
The 7 teams of Endurance reunite to relive some of their best and worst moments. During the special, the teams and the audience vote on which guy and girl they want to see return for season 2. The players vote for Max and Jenna (the Gray Team), but J.D. decides to wait until season 2 to reveal the final, official results. The special ends with a preview of the new season.

==== Best of Endurance: California ====
Another recap episode; this time, J.D. reviews the entire season.

== Season 2: Desert (2003–04) ==
The following episodes are the episode list for Endurance. Episode twenty-three and thirty are specials. The twenty-third episode recaps the events of the first six days. The thirtieth episode recaps the most dramatic moments of Endurance Season Two.

No.	Title	Original release date
14	"Drop-Out"	September 27, 2003
15	"Wash-Out"	October 4, 2003
16	"Tower Of Power"	October 11, 2003
17	"Fireball"	October 18, 2003
18	"Rollerball"	October 25, 2003
19	"Tide Pull"	November 1, 2003
Special	"Halftime"	November 8, 2003
20	"On The Ropes"	January 3, 2004
21	"Face To Face"	January 10, 2004
22	"Cherry Picker"	January 17, 2004
23	"Aqueduct"	January 24, 2004
24	"Plank Maze"	January 31, 2004
25	"Pathfinder"	February 7, 2004
Special	"The Home Stretch"	February 14, 2004
26	"Finale Mission"	February 21, 2004
27	"Finale 2"	February 28, 2004
Special	"Best of Endurance 2: Desert"	March 11, 2006

=== Episode description ===
==== Drop-Out ====
Twenty all-new contestants arrive in a desert in Baja, Mexico, where they get acquainted with one another before competing in the Right-to-Stay Challenge. This time, the contestants stand on a platform while holding onto a bar. If a player pulls the bar down too far, the platform will give away, leaving them dangling. The first three girls and guys to let go are automatically eliminated. In the end, David Cofresi, Glen Powell, Trey Griffin, Sarah Ruckreigle, Abbey Konz, and Simone Bouffard are eliminated, leaving 14 players to pick both their partners AND their team color.

==== Wash Out ====
The 14 remaining players prepare for the partner selection challenge, and almost every guy wants Jacquelynn Pointer as their partner, especially Wayne Williams. In the challenge, a colored ball (along with some water) will drop from above and whoever catches it is on that colored team. To make things interesting, J.D. puts a curtain in between the girls and the guys, so no one discovers their partner until the end. At the end, Wayne is partnered with Maryelle DeVitto, forming the Gray Team, Jacquelynn is paired with Phil Morelli, forming the Red Team, Annie Kim and Jeff Phillips become the Purple Team, Mike Lavigne and Keetin Marchi become the Green Team, Shep Allen and Calley Payne become the Yellow Team, and Tyler Burkhalter and Michelle Durand become the Orange Team, leaving Scooter Magruder and Christa Schultz as the Blue Team. After choosing their Pyramid Pieces: Discipline (Red), Trust (Blue), Knowledge (Orange), Leadership (Purple), Commitment (Yellow), Heart (Gray), and Teamwork (Green), J.D. reveals which season 1 contestants have returned: Max and Jenna, who form the Brown Team and receive the Perseverance piece. After announcing the grand prize: a trip to the Bahamas, many teams begin to set their sights on the Brown Team due to them having more experience.

==== Tower of Power ====
The 8 teams must race through an obstacle course, picking up blocks as they go, in order to form a tower. The first team to cross the finish line with 10 blocks wins the race. As an added twist, J.D. announces that this will be a Temple Mission, meaning one team will be eliminated, as usual. J.D. also reveals that the team eliminated will be able to give their piece to any team they want. The Green Team wins, and decides to send the Orange and Gray Teams to the Temple of Fate out of fear of retaliation from the other teams. At the Temple of Fate, despite their best efforts, the Gray Team is sent home first for the second time in a row.

==== Fireball ====
The Gray Team tells the Green team to "send Tyler home" in Endurance's first trade of pieces. After the Gray Team gives their Heart Pyramid Piece to the Purple Team, the 7 remaining teams compete in their first Endurance Mission of the season, where a member of each team shoots a ball to their partner on a floating platform in the water. If they catch it, that person takes out any team they want. The last team is the winner. In the end, the Purple Team wins the game, receiving the Luck Pyramid Piece and the Samadhi. Tensions run high in the Orange Team, Phil and Jacqueline start a "relationship", the Brown Team gets to know everyone, and the Purple Team gives the Orange Team the Samadhi at The Cove, Season 2's meeting spot, giving them an extra ball to control in the Temple Mission.

==== Rollerball ====
The 7 teams compete in a challenge where they must guide a ball through a maze without letting it fall off the edge. The first team to put 2 balls in the basket at the end of the platform wins. Due to receiving an extra ball in the Samadhi, the Orange Team needs to put 3 balls in the basket to win. In the end, the Green Team wins their second Temple Mission in a row. After consulting Yellow, Brown and Purple, the Green Team sends the Red Team and the Orange Team to the Temple of Fate, shocking every team who thought they would pick Purple. The Orange Team wins again, sending the Red Team home and putting their Discipline Pyramid Piece up for grabs in the next Endurance Mission.

==== Tide Pull ====
The 6 remaining teams receive a message from the Red Team, giving their Discipline Pyramid Piece to the Blue Team and talking down to the Green Team. The teams then compete in a challenge where a team member will paddle out with a boat as far as possible. After 30 seconds, the other team members will try to pull in a teams' boat. The last one left wins. In the end, the Brown Team wins, receiving the Strength Pyramid Piece and the Samadhi. The Brown and Purple Teams battle each other while ensuring their hatred of Blue, Yellow confirms a Top 5 plan with Brown and Green, Calley talks about bullying on the beach, and the Brown Team shocks the Blue Team by giving them the Samadhi, giving them a 10-second delay before starting the Temple Mission.

==== Halftime ====
A look back at the season thus far, showing off a preview of the eighth through thirteenth episodes.

==== On the Ropes ====
As Blue plans revenge on Brown by sending them and Yellow to the Temple, the teams compete in a challenge where one team member must guide their teammate with a rope through a course of holes while the team member with the rope is blindfolded. The first team to reach the end wins. In the end, the Brown team wins, sending the Purple team and the Blue team to the Temple of Fate. At the Temple, the Purple Team wins, sending the Blue Team home and putting their Discipline and Trust Pyramid Pieces up for grabs in the next episode.

==== Face to Face ====
After the Blue Team gives the Purple Team their Discipline and Trust Pyramid Pieces to the Purple team, complementing them and Green on winning, the 5 remaining teams play in the next Endurance Mission. In this mission, teammates stand face-to-face while holding a rope and being suspended by bungee cords. The last team to hold on wins. In the end, the Purple Team wins, receiving the Courage piece and the Samadhi. Purple's lead makes them a target to worry about, Annie apologizes to Calley, and the Purple Team gives the Samadhi to the Brown Team, giving them a handicap of 2 feet in the Temple Mission.

==== Cherry Picker ====
At the Temple Mission, teams must put together 3 poles and transfer their team colored ball to the top of a tower. If the ball falls, the team must start again at the beginning. The team who gets 3 balls in their tower wins. Due to the Samadhi, the Brown team has an extra 24 inches (2 ft) added to their tower. In the end, the Purple Team wins, sending the Brown Team and the Yellow Team to the Temple of Fate. The Brown Team wins, sending the Yellow Team home and putting their Commitment Pyramid Piece up for grabs for the next day.

==== Aqueduct ====
The Yellow Team gives their Commitment Pyramid Piece to the Brown Team, talking the Purple Team down. In the Endurance Mission, the remaining four teams build an aqueduct (as the title suggests) using different sized pieces from the end to the barrel. The team whose water flows to the end wins. In the end, the Orange Team finally wins, receiving the Ingenuity Pyramid Piece and the Samadhi. The final four gets serious, friendships are tested, and the Orange Team takes the Samadhi out of the game, similar to last year, giving them a level playing field on one condition that could involve the Green Team...

==== Plank Maze ====
On a level playing field, the teams must move across planks from barrel to barrel, collecting lettered tiles as they go. A dead end means that the team must backtrack for another plank. The collected letters spell out a word that the teams must unscramble. If they fall, they must start from the beginning. The first team to get to the end and spell the word ("Leadership") correctly wins. In the end, the Green Team wins, sending the Purple Team and the Brown Team. The Brown Team wins, sending the Purple Team home and putting their 6 Pyramid Pieces (Leadership, Trust, Heart, Discipline, Courage, and Luck) up for grabs in the next competition.

==== Pathfinder ====
The Purple Team's removal changes the game forever. They tell the Orange team that they give them their 6 Pyramid Pieces (Leadership, Trust, Heart, Discipline, Courage, and Luck), not Brown as expected. In the final challenge before the finale, the teams compete to stay on the island. In the challenge, players use colored squares on game boards to make a path between points without going diagonally or crossing paths. The first to connect the paths correctly wins. Even though Green seems to have won, they make a mistake that causes the Brown Team to win, sending the Orange Team and the Green Team to the Temple of Fate. Green wins, sending them to the final round and send the Orange Team home, putting their 8 Pyramid Pieces (Leadership, Trust, Heart, Discipline, Courage, Luck, Knowledge, and Ingenuity) up for grabs in the final mission before the Golden Pyramids final round.

==== The Home Stretch ====
A look back at the season thus far, showing off a preview of the final two episodes, Final Mission and Finale 2.

==== Final Mission ====
As the title suggests, the final mission of Endurance 2 is a big shock. Orange's 8 Pyramid Pieces (Leadership, Trust, Heart, Discipline, Courage, Luck, Knowledge, and Ingenuity) are individually up for grabs in the mission. In an old "cat-and-mouse" style chase, the teams must take orange triangles from their opponent's basket and put it in theirs. In the end, even though the Green Team won, the teams split the amount of Pyramid Pieces at 4 each. The final count of pieces before the end was: Brown: 7 (Yellow's Commitment piece, the Strength piece, their Perseverance piece, the Luck piece, Gray's Heart piece, Blue's Trust piece, and Orange's Knowledge piece); Green: 5 (their Teamwork piece, the Courage piece, the Ingenuity piece, Purple's Leadership piece, and Red's Discipline piece). After receiving their pieces for the finals, J.D. gave the teams necklaces that look like the Temple (similar to the carved rocks of the first season) to remember their time at the beach, colored Green, Brown, and all of the fallen teams that left in order. This episode also segues into Finale 2.

==== Finale 2 ====
After the players say their goodbyes, the teams battle in the final challenge at the Temple of Fate, where the Brown Team wins it all and becomes the second Endurance champions.

==== Best of Endurance 2: Desert ====
This is another recap episode; this time, J.D. reviews the entire season.

== Season 3: Hawaii (2004–05) ==
No.	Title	Original release date
Special	"Casting Special (Part 1)"	September 4, 2004
Special	"Casting Special (Part 2)"	September 11, 2004
28	"The Arrival"	September 25, 2004
29	"First Elimination"	October 2, 2004
30	"Pick Your Partner"	October 9, 2004
31	"Headstrong"	October 16, 2004
32	"Ring of Fire"	October 23, 2004
33	"Bagging on You"	October 30, 2004
34	"Squaring Off"	November 6, 2004
35	"Out on a Limb"	November 13, 2004
36	"From 20 to 12"	November 27, 2004
37	"Bamboo Jungle"	December 4, 2004
38	"Pipeline"	December 11, 2004
39	"I'm Pulling for You"	December 18, 2004
40	"Balance Ball"	January 8, 2005
41	"The Halfway Mark"	January 15, 2005
42	"The Final Four"	January 22, 2005
43	"Create Your Own Game"	January 29, 2005
44	"Final Elimination"	February 5, 2005
45	"Battle for the Pieces"	February 12, 2005
46	"Season Finale 3"	February 19, 2005
Special	"Galapagos Special"	September 10, 2005
Special	"Best of Endurance Hawaii"	September 17, 2005

=== Episode description ===
==== Casting Special ====
A two-part special episode, where J.D. and the other Endurance crew members cast the contestants of Endurance 3: Hawaii.

==== The Arrival ====
20 all new contestants arrive in Kauai, Hawaii, the location for the third season of Endurance. Once there, J.D. explains the rules to them and reveals a new twist: the contestants get to choose which guy and which girl gets a free pass on the right to stay challenge. After much debate, Reece Bors and Lindi Oest are the first two contestants to become Endurance players, though some of the newcomers feel this to be unfair since they were chosen entirely because of their looks. As for the other 18 newcomers, they are forced to face the right to stay challenge, where the contestants hang onto poles suspended over the water. As always, the first three girls and guys to let go and fall into the water are automatically eliminated, while the others become official Endurance players. This time around, though, the girls go first instead of the guys, and Eleanor Monahan, Vanetta Smith, and Taylor Madison are the first to be eliminated. The guys then prepare to compete for their right to stay and the episode ends...

==== First Elimination ====
The guys take the right to stay challenge and Marshall Kathedar, Thomas "Tom" Maden, and Brandon Anderson are the next ones to go, leaving the other 14 newcomers as official Endurance players. After spending the night together, the players talk about who they want as their partner, with most of the girls, except for Alex Reid, distrusting Monroe Gierl. The contestants then compete in the partner selection game, where a catapult hurls a numbered ball (balls numbered 1-14) at the player and they have to catch it, because lower the numbered ball, the better the chances they have of getting the partner they want. Demian Martinez gets the #1 ball, Lindi the #2 ball, Reece the #3 ball, Antonio Iannicelli the #4 ball, Chris Vanderweir the #5 ball, Bryanah Bascon the #6 ball, Willa Zhou gets the #7 ball, and Nicole Clark gets the #8 ball before the episode ends.

==== Pick Your Partner ====
The partner selection challenge continues as the players compete for the perfect partner. Bjorn Leu, gets the #9 ball, Alex gets the #10 ball, Sarah Baker gets the #11 ball, Rachel Lofton gets the #12 ball, Monroe gets the #13 ball, and Kareem Nugent gets the #14 ball. Then they get to choose their team color; Kareem chooses blue, Monroe chooses yellow, Rachel chooses red, Sarah chooses purple, and Alex and Bjorn become the Green Team. Then J.D. announces a twist that allows the lower numbered contestants to bump another player to a different color to get the partner they want. Afterwards, the selection process continues, as Nicole chooses orange as her team color, Willa joins Kareem on the Blue Team, Bryanah and Chris form the Gray Team, Antonio replaces Kareem as Willa's partner; Kareem then partners with Nicole, forming the Orange Team, Reese joins Sarah and forms the Purple Team, Lindi replaces Bryanah as Chris' partner (leaving everyone in complete shock), causing Bryanah to be partnered with Monroe and form Yellow Team, and Demian replaces Kareem as Nicole's partner, causing Kareem to be partner with Rachel and form the Red Team. Later, J.D. gives the teams their starting pyramid pieces: Teamwork for Yellow, Commitment for Blue, Trust for Red, Knowledge for Gray, Leadership for Orange, Discipline for Purple, and Heart for Green. J.D. then announces the grand prize trip to the Galápagos Islands, and the episode ends.

==== Headstrong ====
The 7 Endurance Teams receive a shock when Eleanor, Vanetta, Taylor, Marshall, Tom, and Brandon return for a shot at becoming the 8th team on Endurance, the Brown Team. In the Headstrong challenge, the six returnees have to balance carvings between their heads and a bamboo pole and the person who lasts the longest wins and gets to choose their partner for the Brown Team. After almost a half an hour, Tom wins and chooses Vanetta as his partner, forming the Brown Team and receiving the Perseverance pyramid piece. Afterwards, Tom immediately forms an alliance with Kareem because of their friendship together, while Monroe is angry with Tom for not choosing Taylor, whom Monroe considers a close friend, as his partner.

==== Ring of Fire ====
The eight teams compete in their first Endurance mission. The challenge involves the teams holding onto a pole in a ring. If the pole touches the ring, the ring will catch fire and that team is out. The last remaining team wins. In the end, the Purple Team wins the Strength piece and the Samadhi. Willa loses her temper at Antonio because she thought they lost due to him not helping her. The Purple Team gives the Yellow Team the Samadhi. The Yellow Team finds a rope inside.

==== Bagging on You ====
The teams compete in their first Temple Mission meaning one team will be eliminated. The teams must throw two bags tied together to a platform some distance away in the water. If their bags are on the platform, that team gets to eliminate any team who missed theirs. The Yellow Team has to stand a few feet further back due to the Samadhi. However, they shock everyone by winning and send the Blue and Orange Teams to the Temple of Fate. The Blue Team becomes the first team to leave.

==== Squaring Off ====
The Blue team gives their Commitment piece to the Orange Team, tying them with Purple for the lead. J.D. then tells everyone that the next challenge is a temple mission meaning another team will be leaving right after the first team left. The challenge involves the teams one at a time each putting a triangle on another team's group of squares. The last remaining team wins. In the end, the Orange Team wins after the Gray Team eliminates themselves. The Orange Team sends Yellow and Green to temple. The Yellow Team wins sending the Green Team home.

==== Out on a Limb ====
The Green Team gives their Heart piece to the Yellow Team. The teams then get a surprise when the next Endurance Mission isn't for a pyramid piece or a Samadhi. Instead the winning team will make Super Teams (three teams on each) to compete against each other in the following Temple Mission. The challenge involves the girls sitting on the end of a seesaw while the guys hold onto ropes attached to the seesaws to keep the girls up for as long as possible. The last remaining team wins. In the end, the Yellow Team wins and gets the power to make Super Teams. The Yellow Team makes their Super Team of Yellow, Purple, and Gray thinking they have the strongest teams. The other Super Team is Orange, Brown, and Red and Tom is disappointed that he wasn't chosen to be on Monroe's Super Team.

==== From 20 to 12 ====
A mid-season recap with a preview for the remaining ten episodes.

==== Bamboo Jungle ====
The two Super Teams compete in another Temple Mission where they have to go through an obstacle course made of bamboo and go back through in order to win, making all three winning teams safe from going to Temple. When Vanetta isn't moving quickly for her team to win, The Yellow-Purple-Gray Super Team wins and Brown and Red are forced to go to Temple. The Red Team ends up being the third team eliminated.

==== Pipeline ====
The Red Team gives their Trust piece to the Purple Team, putting them in the lead with three pieces. The teams compete in a challenge that involves both team members working together to get three large balls across a pipe using poles. But the Samadhi up for grabs will benefit any teams who wins or receives it. In the end, the Gray Team wins their first challenge by themselves and wins the Samadhi. They crack it open and are given two options: steal another team's pieces or switch partners with another team. The Gray Team decides to take the Yellow Team's two pieces (Teamwork and Heart) tying them with Purple while the Yellow Team is left with nothing.

==== I'm Pulling for You ====
The teams compete in another Endurance Mission that requires the team members to pull themselves with ropes in order to get triangles to the shelves on top. The first team to get twelve triangles to the top wins. In the end, the Gray Team wins their third mission (second independent) and gets the Courage piece and the Samadhi. The Courage piece puts the Gray Team in the lead with four pieces and the Yellow Team gets the Samadhi for a second time forcing them to sit out the following Temple Mission.

==== Balance Ball ====
Chris vows to send the Yellow Team if the Gray Team wins the Temple Mission. Shockingly, Vanetta of the Brown Team pulls out of the game due to hurting her knee and needing stitches. Tom decides to continue, however, as a one-person team. The Temple Mission has the players transporting balls on boards from one end of the field to the other before sliding the ball into their chute. If the teams drop any of the balls, they must start back from the start. The first team to get three balls into their chute wins. The Yellow Team sits out because of the Samadhi. Tom ends up failing without his partner and the Purple Team wins, sending Tom and the Yellow Team to temple. Unfortunately, Tom is sent home alone.

==== The Halfway Mark ====
Tom gives the Yellow Team his Perseverance piece, putting them back in the game. The teams then compete in a thinking challenge where they must make a triangle while following a dot pattern on them. The dots must match in order for a team to win. In the end, the Yellow Team wins earning the Luck piece and the Samadhi. The Gray Team ends up getting the Samadhi which has them wait until a ball is caught before participating in the next Temple Mission.

==== The Final Four ====
The next challenge has the players filling a pouch with water, dumping it in one of three tubs, and waiting for balls (numbered 1-3) to shoot out of the three cannons behind the tubs. Because they got the Samadhi, the Gray Team has to wait until the first ball is caught before going into the game. In the end, the Orange Team wins and Gray and Purple both go to temple for the first time where the Purple Team is sent home.

==== Create Your Own Game ====
Purple leaves their three pieces to their allies on Gray, giving them a tremendous lead in the final three. In yet another Endurance first this season, the remaining contestants are allowed to create their own game, with the reward being the final Samadhi and the Ingenuity piece— what they end up devising is a challenge where the males direct the blindfolded females toward five of their team-colored triangles, while trying to avoid the tiki statuettes scattered on the field. Gray wins their third mission, making their lead of pyramid pieces insurmountable for the Yellow and Orange teams. At the island, the final Samadhi is not removed from the game for the first time in the series' history; despite Yellow's statement of doing so that Gray creates a level playing field for the second-to-last day, they give them their third Samadhi this season— what's inside is a tablet with "1" inscribed on it, indicating that Yellow will have one extra row in the final Temple Mission

==== Final Elimination ====
After some relaxation in the rivers of Kauai, the final three teams participate in the final Temple Mission. For the challenge Color Coded, each team must figure out a code of marks underneath each colored disc in seven rows, while correctly memorizing that at the same time in any event of a mistake— after several rounds, Orange's luck holds out as they pull off an upset win, securing their place in the final two. As a result, Gray and Yellow are automatically sent to the last Temple of Fate— on their third trip, Yellow is defeated by Gray, and they become the final team to exit the game.

==== Battle for the Pieces ====
In the final mission of Endurance: Hawaii, the Orange and Gray teams will compete for the two pieces left behind by Yellow, Luck and Perseverance. Beforehand, they decorate a pair of rafts that serve as a memorial to the fallen teams from that season, who were also their friends and allies; later on, they use those same devices in an old-fashioned boat race which circumnavigates the island lagoon they're on— four burlap triangles are stationed throughout, with only one housing the Luck piece, whereas the Perseverance piece is at the finish line. The long-standing conflict between Nicole and Demian climaxes during the mission, weighing Orange down significantly, and easily allowing Gray to win the two pieces in contention— the official score heading into the final Temple is Gray leading with 10 (their Knowledge piece, Yellow's Teamwork piece, Green's Heart piece, the Courage piece, Purple's Discipline piece, the Strength piece, Red's Trust piece, the Ingenuity piece, the Luck piece and Brown's Perseverance piece), and Orange with 2 (their Leadership piece and Blue's Commitment piece).

==== Season Finale 3 ====
Prior to heading into the final Temple of Fate championship, Chris, Lindi, Demian and Nicole are awarded a new pyramid piece, Friendship (this will be introduced in the subsequent season premiere), to remember their experience in the jungles of the Wainiha Valley of Kauai. By nightfall, they depart the camp and take one last trek through the bamboo forest to the Temple of Fate— in the championship, the Gray team wins all 12 pyramid pieces in five rounds, becoming the champions of Endurance: Hawaii, alongside earning a vacation endorsed by Lindblad Expeditions to the Galápagos Islands.

==== Galapagos Special ====
The champions of Endurance: Hawaii, Chris Vanderweir and Lindi Oest, enjoy their expedition to the Galápagos Islands, where they meet some of the rarest creatures on the globe, and see the world's loneliest animal, a turtle by the name of Lonesome George.

==== Best of Endurance 3: Hawaii ====
In the third installment of season recaps, JD documents the entire third season.

== Season 4: Tehachapi (2005–06) ==
No.	Title	Original release date
47	"Hang Glide"	October 1, 2005
48	"Power Play"	October 8, 2005
49	"Blocked"	October 15, 2005
50	"Raft Pull"	October 22, 2005
51	"Drop Out"	November 26, 2005
52	"Super Stumped"	December 3, 2005
Special	"The Halfway Point"	January 14, 2006
53	"Waterworks"	January 21, 2006
54	"The Return of Fireball"	January 28, 2006
55	"Hang 5"	February 4, 2006
56	"Cubed"	February 11, 2006
57	"Create Your Own Game"	February 25, 2006
58	"Circle of Trust"	March 4, 2006
59	"Spin Fly"	March 25, 2006
60	"Finale 4"	March 25, 2006
Special	"Best of Endurance Tehachapi"	October 7, 2006
Special	"Top Ten Games"	December 30, 2006

=== Episode description ===
==== Hang Glide ====
In the season premiere, 20 strangers arrive at their new home in the Tehachapi Mountains for the entire season. After spending a day with one another, the contestants face the Right-To-Stay Challenge: holding onto a bar while suspended a few feet above the water. The first three girls and guys to let go and fall into the water are automatically sent home. In the end, the underdogs defeat the big and strong as Brittany Harvey, Kendell Yorkey, Brooke Bellows, Nicholas Verderosa, Tucker Baer, and Keith Walker are sent home, leaving the other 14 "strangers" as official Endurance players.

==== Power Play ====
The 14 remaining contestants are put into their partner selection challenge: holding a wooden cylinder up in the air for as long as they can. The last one standing wins. They all compete except for Shea Thomas and Amelia "Georgia" Land, who become the Blue Team after speaking up for whom they wanted as their partners. In the end Christopher Tavarez wins and chooses Callie Simpkins as his partner, forming the Yellow Team. They choose the remaining teams: Franke Sisto and Erika Cook become the Red Team, Jonathan Lebowitz and Daniella Bustamante become the Purple Team (even though Daniella wanted to be paired with Michael Delvecchio), John Kardian and Julie Dubela become the Gray Team, and Michael and Kylie Glessman become the Orange Team, leaving Isaac Hainley and Jeszie Geronimo as the Green Team. After the teams choose their Pyramid Pieces, Courage (Blue), Trust (Yellow), Heart (Red), Perseverance (Purple), Commitment (Gray), Knowledge (Orange), and Leadership (Green), as well as the announcing of the Grand Prize- a trip to Costa Rica, the game officially begins.

==== Blocked ====
The teams face their first Endurance mission: they have to hold blocks between one another as they go down a lane, picking up more blocks. The only drawback is that if the blocks are dropped, the team has to pick them up before continuing on. The first team back with all of their blocks wins the Teamwork piece and control of the Samadhi. In the end, the Green team wins, putting them in the lead with two Pyramid Pieces, and they decide to handicap their friends on the Gray Team, after learning that Gray has a strong friendship with Blue. The Gray Team ends up getting handicapped with four sandbags.

==== Raft Pull ====
The teams face their first elimination and everyone's eyes are set on Gray and Blue because of their strong friendship. The teams have to pile sandbags on another team's colored triangle for 30 seconds before loading sandbags they've been given onto their raft. The teams must then pull their rafts to the other side of the lake and grab their team flag. The first team to make it back and mount their flag onto their colored triangle wins the opportunity to send two teams to the Temple of Fate. Because they got the Samadhi, the Gray Team is given four additional sandbags to start with. Gray and Blue end up with the most sandbags and the Purple Team mounts their flag one second before the Red Team and wins the Temple Mission, and as expected, Gray and Blue are sent to the temple. In the end, the Curse of the Gray Team strikes again and the Gray Team is sent home first for the third time in Endurance history, and the Blue Team is given a warm welcome-back from the other five teams.

==== Drop Out ====
Following the Gray Team's elimination, they give their Commitment piece to the Blue Team as a sign of a true friendship, putting Blue and Green in a tie for first place. The teams are faced with their next mission: hanging onto a bar suspended a couple of inches over the water (their feet on one end and their hands on the other) for as long as they can. The last one standing wins their team the Discipline piece and the power to choose two opposing teams that will form their Super Team in tomorrow's Temple Mission. In a shocking development, Erika outlasts all of the guys, winning the challenge for the Red Team and putting them in first place with Green and Blue. In the end, they end up choosing Green and Yellow as part of their Super Team, leaving Purple, Orange, and Blue, the "underdog teams", to face their opponents in the next temple mission.

==== Super Stumped ====
In today's Temple Mission, it's Red, Yellow, and Green vs. Orange, Blue, and Purple in the Super Team Temple Mission. The contestants have to use two planks to make a bridge to their team flag, and then build another bridge back to shore. The winning Super Team gets to send two of the three teams on the opposing Super Team to the Temple of Fate. After the Red/Green/Yellow Super Team stacks one of their planks on the end of the other, making them jump into the water so Erika can move it, the Purple/Orange/Blue Super Team manages to snag a victory, making this their first (and only) win for Orange and Blue. Even though Jonathan was unsure on whom to send (because Purple is in an alliance with Green and Yellow), the winning Super Team ultimately decides to send Red and Yellow to the Temple, where Yellow becomes the second team to be eliminated from the competition. This also starts a history of the Yellow Team never making it past 6th place.

==== The Halfway Point ====
This was a special recap episode, which recapped the events of the season up until now. A sneak preview of the remaining eight episodes is shown at the end.

==== Waterworks ====
Following the Yellow Team's elimination, the Green Team reads a note from them, saying that they are giving their Trust piece to the Red Team, putting them in the lead, while Green and Blue remain in second place, each with two pieces. The five remaining teams have to take a piece of canvas and fill it with water, which they must dump into their team-colored barrel, and repeat the process until one team's barrel is filled to the rim with water, which will shoot out the top of the barrel. The winning team gets the Luck piece, and, as usual, the Samadhi. But there's a catch: the losing team will be given a one-way ticket to the Temple of Fate, unless they win the next Temple Mission. In the end, the Green Team wins, putting them in first place with Red, who receives the Samadhi, which contains a ten-foot rope, and the Purple Team ends up finishing last, putting them in great danger.

==== The Return of Fireball ====
In a very unusual episode of Endurance: Tehachapi, J.D. and Daniella, who is the ultimate Endurance fan, reveal that they went online and asked the fans about choosing a past Temple Mission to appear again. The winner? Fireball. Because they got the Samadhi, the Red Team's raft is placed ten feet further away from shore. In the end, the Green Team wins, and they send Purple (because they lost and thus, were automatically sent to the temple) and Orange (because the other teams saw them as a threat after eliminating Purple from the Temple Mission) to the Temple of Fate. In the end, the Orange Team becomes the third team to be eliminated from the competition.

==== Hang 5 ====
In the opening, the Red Team reads the Orange Team's farewell note and end up receiving their Knowledge piece, putting them in the lead with four pieces, Green is in second with three pieces, Blue in third with two, and Purple in last with only one. The four remaining teams compete for the Strength piece in the next mission, where one team member holds onto a bar suspended over the water while their partner sits on top and moves their partner across. The team member hanging onto the bar has to transport five team-colored triangles back to the other side, one at a time. The first place team receives the Strength piece and, once again, control over the Samadhi. In the end, the Green Team wins, continuing their legendary winning streak, and then argue fiercely over who should get the Samadhi. In the end, Erika tells Jeszie to give the Smadhi to the Red Team, which ends up happening. Franke breaks it open and inside, the Red Team discovers a drawing of a clock with both hands pointing to the number 60.

==== Cubed ====
In the second-to-last Temple Mission, the teams have to assemble a team-colored cube before the other teams do, making this a mental challenge. Because they got the Samadhi, the Red Team is forced to sit out for one minute before starting, but they never get the chance, because, in a shocking development, the Purple Team wins in 51 seconds. When announcing who they are sending to the Temple of Fate, Purple spares the Green Team because of their still-going alliance, sending Red and Blue to the Temple each a second time. In the end, the Red Team wins and is locked into the Final 3, while the Blue Team leaves the competition.

==== Create Your Own Game 2 ====
As the Blue team leaves their Courage and Commitment pieces to the Green Team, putting them in the lead with six Pyramid Pieces (the Red Team is in second with four pieces, while the Purple Team still has only one), the "Create Your Own Game" challenge returns to the show as the second-to-last mission this season. The Final 3 design a 3-legged race type of game, where the teams, with their ankles tied together, have to knock down 5 team-colored cubes off a barrel at the same time, before grabbing three blocks and making their way through the rope obstacle course. Once that's done with, the blocks have to be balanced on a cylinder all the way back to the starting line. The winner gets the Samadhi and the Ingenuity piece. In the end, the Purple Team wins their first and only Endurance mission and are put onto the board with two pieces and they give the Samadhi to the Green Team, who discover two ten-pound weights hidden inside.

==== Circle of Trust ====
In the final Endurance 4 Temple Mission, the teams have to hang on to a square-shaped bar while being held up by bungee chords. The last team hanging on to each other gets a spot in the Final 2 while the losing two teams go to the Temple of Fate. In the end, Erika proves her strength yet again by winning the challenge for the Red Team, sending Purple and Green to the temple (the second time Purple has visited the temple). Sadly in the end, the Green Team is eliminated and the Purple Team is locked into the Final 2.

==== Spin Fly ====
In the final Endurance 4 Mission, the Red and Purple teams must compete for the Friendship piece, and the six pieces that the Green Team left behind: Leadership, Teamwork, Courage, Commitment, Strength, and Luck. Red and Purple create memorials for their previously departed teammates/friends and competes in their final mission: one team member from each team is suspended from a beam and has throw sandbags onto one of the pieces in order to claim it. The other teammates have to run in a circle to give their partners momentum before joining in the game. Purple ends up getting four, while Red ends up getting three. The mission puts Red in the lead with seven (their Heart piece, the Discipline piece, Yellow's Trust piece, Orange's Knowledge piece, the Luck piece, Blue's Courage piece, and the Teamwork piece) and Purple in second with six (their Perseverance piece, the Ingenuity piece, Green's Leadership piece, the Friendship piece, the Strength piece, and Gray's Commitment piece). In the end, the teams prepare to head to their final challenge in the Temple of Fate and J.D. presents a preview of the finale.

==== Finale 4 ====
Before going into the final challenge at the Temple of Fate, Franke, Jonathan, Daniella, and Erika are each given a log with the season's artwork etched onto one side as a reminder of what the four accomplished in the game. After making their last confessionals and talking about how they would miss the mountains, they head to the Temple for the finale challenge, which, as usual, involves putting the Pyramid Pieces earned in the game in front of a silver pyramid (the number of pyramids increases by one each round) and the team with the gold pyramid gets all of the pieces on the table. The game keeps going until one team has won all thirteen pieces. In the end, the Red Team, Franke and Erika, after six tormenting rounds, become the Endurance: Tehachapi champions, winning the grand prize trip to Costa Rica for an eight-day trip, where they help researchers track the endangered sea turtle, and get up close and personal with rain forest creatures from an observation deck 100 feet high up in the air.

==== Best of Endurance: Tehachapi ====
J.D. recaps the entire fourth season of Endurance.

==== Top 10 Games ====
J.D. reveals the top 10 missions of the first four seasons, as selected by the viewers on the official Discovery Kids website.

== Season 5: High Sierras (2006–07) ==
No.	Title	Original release date
61	"Balance is the Key"	October 14, 2006
62	"Hanging Around"	October 21, 2006
63	"Unwind"	October 28, 2006
64	"Hot Potato"	November 4, 2006
65	"Moving It Along"	November 11, 2006
66	"Walk the Plank"	January 13, 2007
67	"Fill & Spill"	January 20, 2007
68	"Superboats"	January 27, 2007
Special	"Mid-Season Recap 5"	February 3, 2007
69	"It's a Drag"	February 10, 2007
70	"Create Your Own Game 3"	February 17, 2007
71	"Fill 'er Up"	February 24, 2007
72	"All Tied Up"	March 3, 2007
73	"Slingshot Alley"	March 17, 2007
74	"Finale 5"	March 17, 2007
Special	"Best of Endurance High Sierras"	May 27, 2007

=== Episode description ===
==== Balance is the Key ====
20 all new contestants arrive at Shaver Lake, deep within the High Sierras, where the fifth season of Endurance takes place. After spending a night with one another, J.D. reveals that one boy and one girl will be chosen from among both sexes to skip the Right to Stay Challenge— shockingly, that same person will choose one more contestant to skip the challenge as well! In the end, the girls select Darci Miller and Kelsey Schultz to take the free pass, whereas the boys select Aric Manthey and Alex Carignan. In the Right to Stay Challenge, each contestant must traverse a balance beam, trying to complete five laps as quickly as possible, with the last two girls and boys to finish being eliminated. Lilly Brown, Taylor Sico-McNulty, Kristine Turner and Cealey Godwin complete all their laps first, leaving Aeriel Miranda, Anna Nti-Asare, Martina Iwala and Stefanie Fernandez to vie for the last two spots in the next episode.

==== Hanging Around ====
Picking up where the girls' race in the Right to Stay Challenge left off, Aeriel and Anna claim the remaining two spots, whereas Martina and Stefanie are automatically eliminated. In the boys' race, Dakota Fisher, Garret Manno, Connor Finnegan, Max McFarland, Cameron Uranick and Ike Moody are the first complete all their laps, automatically eliminating Adrian Bardales and Rafael Liriano. The following day, the remaining 16 contestants discuss who they want as partners. Much drama ensues with Taylor's refusal to be paired with Garret, and some contestants even contemplate having them as a team to be an easy target. In the partner selection game, the last person holding on will win the right to choose the first team, although it's not going to be their own (to be continued in the next episode).

==== Unwind ====
Dakota wins the partner selection game, and picks Cameron and Aeriel to be the first team. They then select Dakota and Kelsey to be second team, who selects Alex and Cealey to be the third team, who selects Aric and Lilly to be the fourth team, who selects Max and Kristine to be the fifth team, who selects Connor and Darci to be the sixth team, who selects Ike and Taylor to be the seventh team, leaving Garret and Anna as the eighth and final team. As yet another added twist, J.D. reveals that the team that finishes in last place, without receiving a color, will be eliminated. In that challenge, each team must untangle themselves from a fence to claim a color. In the end, Garret and Anna finish last, and become the first team eliminated, although they can give the Triangle of Immunity (Friendship piece) to any team they want; the seven official teams are Alex and Cealey on the Green Team (piece is Commitment), Dakota and Kelsey on the Purple Team (piece is Teamwork), Cameron and Aeriel on the Red Team (piece is Knowledge), Aric and Lilly on the Yellow Team (piece is Trust), Ike and Taylor on the Blue Team (piece is Perseverance), Max and Kristine on the Orange Team (piece is Strength), and Connor and Darci on the Gray Team (piece is Luck). The grand prize trip is revealed to be a trip to Hawaii, and the game officially begins.

==== Hot Potato ====
Garret and Anna leave the Triangle of Immunity to the Purple Team, much to Aeriel's chagrin; the seven teams compete in their first Endurance Mission, with the Leadership piece and Samadhi on the line. However, this Samadhi is revealed to allow the winning team to switch two contestants from any two teams, even their own, although they can bestow that responsibility on another team. The challenge requires each team to transport water in bowl with two sticks through an obstacle course to a barrel on the far end, and the winner will be determined by one team's flag going up, indicating that they have enough water in their barrel. In the end, the Blue Team shocks everyone by winning, putting them in a tie for first place with Purple, although both members fear the ramifications of switching teams. Red and Green volunteer to switch, and Purple schemes to have Blue give control to the former, so that they can switch Blue and Gray! Ultimately, Taylor allows Cameron to have control over the switch as planned, and he switches Connor to Blue, and Ike to Gray, but has second thoughts (to be continued in the next episode).

==== Moving it Along ====
In the end, Cameron officially makes Connor and Taylor the new Blue Team, and Ike and Darci as the new Gray Team. In the second Endurance Mission, the teams must move from one end of a clearing to the other using only two blocks. If either player falls, they restart, and whoever reaches the finish line first wins the Discipline piece and Samadhi. In the end, the Blue Team wins their second mission, putting them in the lead with three pieces. Fearing retaliation from the Red-Purple-Green-Orange alliance, they handicap their former teammates. The Gray Team finds a clock inside, with the hand pointing to 4, indicating a 20-second penalty.

==== Walk the Plank ====
The teams face their first Temple Mission, which involves the girls standing at the end of planks held up with ropes by their partners. If they let go, their partner is dropped in the water, eliminating their team, and the last team holding on wins the opportunity to send two teams to the Temple of Fate. Despite Gray's best efforts, the Red Team wins and sends them along with Yellow to the Temple, but not before they bribe Connor to reveal Darci's strategy to Yellow. In the end, Yellow uses Darci's strategy against her, and Gray becomes the second team eliminated.

==== Fill & Spill ====
The Gray Team leaves their Luck piece to the Yellow Team (tying them for second place with Purple), while wishing that Taylor would "trade her tickets for Hawaii for a trip to Temple". In the third Endurance Mission, one player holds onto a bar as their partners dump water into any other team's barrel, and the last team holding on wins the Heart piece and the power to choose the SuperTeams.In the end, Max throws the challenge and allows Purple to win, tying them for first place with Blue. After much contention, Purple joins forces with Red and Orange for the next Temple Mission, whereas Green, Yellow and Blue make up the opposing SuperTeam.

==== Superboats ====
J.D. shockingly reveals that only one team from each SuperTeam would be allowed to participate in the challenge— ultimately, Purple and Blue represent their SuperTeams, with their challenge requiring them to use rafts to collect three flags, each of which is in their SuperTeam colors. In the end, the Purple/Red/Orange SuperTeam wins (second for Purple and Red, first and only for Orange), and Yellow and Blue are sent to the Temple, despite growing resentment of Purple and Green's alliance from the other teams. Yellow becomes the third team eliminated, finishing in 6th place for the second consecutive season.

==== Midseason Recap 5 ====
A mid-season recap with a preview for the remaining six episodes.

==== It's a Drag ====
The Yellow Team gives their Trust and Luck pieces to the Blue Team, giving them the lead. J.D. then tells everyone that the next challenge is a Temple Mission, and the Purple-Green alliance seems to be on the rocks. In the challenge, the teams must haul a 150-lbs. barrel on a sled, using just three logs. The team that drags the barrel over the finish line first wins; in the end, the Green Team wins their first mission, and sends Blue and Orange to the Temple. Dakota helps Orange deceive Taylor about their strategy at Temple, but it fails, as they become the fourth team eliminated.

==== Create Your Own Game 3 ====
The Orange Team gives their Strength piece to the Red Team, and for the third consecutive season, the teams will create their own game for the final Endurance Mission. The final four teams come up with a challenge that requires them to transport five balls using only a pair of bowls, them taking their respectively colored flag back to their starting point. The winning team gets the Ingenuity piece, and, as usual, the Samadhi. But there's a catch: the losing team will be given a one-way ticket to the Temple of Fate, unless they win the next Temple Mission. In the end, the Blue Team wins, and controversy ensues after Cealey accuses Taylor of cheating, which was really just an accident. Ultimately, they strategically handicap Purple, who discover a five-foot rope inside.

==== Fill 'er Up ====
In the second-to-last Temple Mission, each team must transport water with a holed pipe, hoping to force a flotation device out of their tube. In the end, Purple overcomes the Samadhi, and sends Blue and Red to the Temple (the Triangle of Immunity reverts to a regular pyramid piece as of this episode). At the Temple, Blue becomes the first team to survive three trips to the Temple of Fate, and Red becomes the fifth team eliminated.

==== All Tied Up ====
The Red Team gives their Knowledge piece to the Blue Team (putting them in the lead with seven pieces), and the Strength piece to the Green Team, and J.D. reveals that one team will have an advantage in the final Temple Mission. This will be determined by the five teams who had been eliminated already, and Blue earns the most votes, awarding them the advantage; in the final Temple Mission, each team must untangle a pair of tethered balls on a log. In the end, the Purple Team wins, automatically sending Green and Blue to the final Temple, and Blue becomes the last team eliminated.

==== Slingshot Alley ====
In the final mission of Endurance: High Sierras, the Green and Purple teams will compete for the Courage piece, alongside the seven pieces left behind the Blue Team: Perseverance, Leadership, Discipline, Trust, Luck, Ingenuity and Knowledge. Before that, they create memorials in honor of their previously departed friends/teammates using the multi-level treehouses they lived in this season. In the end, Green manages to earn five out of the eight pyramid pieces in contention, giving them seven (their Commitment piece, Orange's Strength piece, the Leadership piece, Yellow's Trust piece, Red's Knowledge piece, the Ingenuity piece and the Discipline piece) over Purple's six (their Teamwork piece, the Friendship piece, the Heart piece, Gray's Luck piece, the Courage piece and Blue's Perseverance piece) in the final competition.

==== Finale 5 ====
Before they compete in the Final Temple of Fate, Alex, Cealey, Dakota and Kelsey are rewarded the Karma piece as a reminder of everything they've accomplished in the game (this will be introduced as a piece in the subsequent season premiere). In the end, the Green Team wins it all and becomes Endurance champions, winning the grand prize trip to Hawaii.

==== Best of Endurance: High Sierras ====
J.D. recaps the entire fifth season of Endurance.

== Season 6: Fiji (2007–08) ==
No.	Title	Original release date
75	"End of the Rope"	October 13, 2007
76	"Memory Race"	October 20, 2007
77	"Mana Kisi"	October 27, 2007
78	"Blind Faith"	November 3, 2007
79	"Box Launch"	November 10, 2007
80	"Alliances Uncovered"	November 17, 2007
81	"Weight an Hour"	November 24, 2007
Special	"Midseason Recap 6"	February 2, 2008
82	"Island Hopping"	February 9, 2008
83	"3 to Go/Shark Bait"	February 16, 2008
84	"Stand Bags"	February 23, 2008
85-86	"Ultimate Finale"	March 1, 2008 - March 8, 2008
Special	"Best of Endurance Fiji"	June 21, 2008
Special	"J.D.'s Greatest Twists"	June 28, 2008

=== Episode description ===
==== End of the Rope ====
16 new contestants arrive in Fiji to compete in the sixth season of Endurance, befriending each other before participating in the Right to Stay Challenge. This time around, the players must hold onto a rope over the ocean for as long as they can, and the first two boys and girls who fall will be automatically eliminated. In an emotional outcome, Andres Ramirez, Matthew Jones, Rebecca Simonoko and Cinnamon Aldridge are eliminated, allowing the remaining 12 contestants to continue onto the real competition.

==== Memory Race ====
The 12 remaining players prepare for the Partner Selection, although Briana Vega steadfastly refuses to be paired with Kyle Curtis, leading to some drama. In the challenge, the players must memorize a sequence of four colored coconuts, with only six racks. After six players take those racks, the ones who have gotten the sequence correct will repeat the process, and whoever has the most correct sequences wins. In the end, Connor Konz wins and partners up with Jackie Wei to become the Purple Team (piece is Leadership). Afterward, they choose Leslie Powell and Will Cuddy as the Green Team (piece is Friendship), Caleb Courtney and Lauren Dixon as the Orange Team (piece is Courage), Hannah Gross and Jonathan Young as the Red Team (piece is Heart), Ben Scheuer and Jordyn Barbato as the Blue Team (piece is Strength), leaving Briana and Kyle as the Yellow Team (piece is Perseverance). Yellow soon finds themselves ostracized from the rest of the group, and after the grand prize trip is revealed as a trip to Australia, the game officially begins.

==== Mana Kisi ====
The teams face their first mission: transporting sixty pegs from one side of the sandbar to the other, hoping to win the Magic Box. In the end, the Green Team wins, and J.D. reveals that the Magic Box contains one free round for them, in the event that they are sent to the Temple of Fate— as another advantage, they can tell the rest of the group whatever they want about it! Ultimately, Green lies about their prize being immunity from getting sent the first Temple of Fate. Meanwhile, Orange and Green form a secret alliance with the goal of controlling the game and making the final two, and at the end of the episode, J.D. visits to unveil a new twist (to be revealed in the next episode).

==== Blind Faith ====
Continuing from the last episode, J.D. reveals that the teams can vote to give one team they think deserves an advantage in the game. The next morning, the Blue Team is unanimously voted to receive the advantage, and it's revealed to be the Luck pyramid piece, putting them in the lead with two pieces. Green and Orange decide on adding Red to their alliance, and the teams compete in an Endurance Mission, where the girls must direct their blindfolded partners to complete a three-piece puzzle. The first team to finish the puzzle wins the Trust pyramid piece and control of the Samadhi; in the end, the Orange Team wins, tying them for the lead with Blue. However, when it's time to give the Samadhi out, J.D. grants Orange the option to swap the Samadhi for the opportunity to send one team to the Temple of Fate! Ultimately, Orange shockingly decided to send a team to Temple, which ended up being the Yellow Team.

==== Box Launch ====
With Yellow already bound for Temple, the teams face off in their first Temple Mission to decide who will join them there. Despite the Purple Team's best efforts, the Red Team wins and sends them with Yellow to the Temple of Fate. In the end, Yellow becomes the first team to be eliminated, finishing in 6th place for the third consecutive season.

==== Alliances Uncovered ====
Yellow leaves their Perseverance piece to Red, creating a three-way tie between them, Blue and Orange. In the second Endurance Mission, the teams must pass along six fishes, then paddle their rafts to the shore, with the first team to do so winning the Teamwork pyramid piece and control of the Samadhi. Despite Orange's best efforts, Green wins, creating a four-way tie for first place with two pieces, and Caleb copes with his father's potential disappointment in his loss during the mission. In the end, Green gives Purple the Samadhi, which is revealed to be 20 pounds of extra weight.

==== Weight an Hour ====
Jackie becomes enraged over being handicapped by the Samadhi, vowing revenge on the Green and Orange Teams if she wins. In the second Temple Mission, the teams must tip a scale using items scattered across the beach, and despite Purple's efforts to help Blue win, Orange wins and sends them both to the Temple of Fate. In the end, Purple becomes the second team to be eliminated.

==== Midseason Recap 6 ====
A mid-season recap with a preview for the remaining five episodes.

==== Island Hopping ====
Purple leaves their Leadership piece to Blue, putting them in the lead once more with three pieces. In the third Endurance Mission, the boys must shoot cannonballs to their partners to clear three different levels, with the winner receiving the Commitment and Discipline pyramid pieces, as well as control of the Samadhi. In the end, Green wins, putting them in the lead with four pieces, while Red's communication breakdown leads to aN argument after the mission. Ultimately, Green gives Red the Samadhi, which reveals that only one member can play the next Temple Mission, who ends up being Jonathan.

==== 3 to Go/Shark Bait ====
Hannah feels betrayed by the Green-Orange alliance, and vows to send them if she wins. In the double Temple Mission, one member of each team competes in a mental game, while their partner competes in a physical game. For the mental game, Ben, Lauren and Leslie must match trios of the names of Endurance pyramid pieces, and whoever clears their board first wins control of one team going to the Temple of Fate. In the end, Blue wins and sends Orange. For the physical game, Caleb, Jonathan, Jordyn and Will must stay atop a ring as long as possible, with the ones lasting the longest winning control over the other team going to Temple. In the end, Red overcomes the Samadhi and sends Green. At the Temple, Green reveals the truth behind the Magic Box to Orange, and Orange becomes the third team to be eliminated.

==== Stand Bags ====
Orange exposes Green's secret about the Magic Box, and leaves their Courage piece to them and the Trust piece to Red. In the final Temple Mission, the teams must gather enough sandbags to reach their respectively colored flags without jumping. Whoever finishes first receives only one teavee nut in their color, with the second-place team receiving five nuts and the third-place team receiving ten nuts. In the end, Red wins, while Green comes in second and Blue comes in third. Later on, two nuts are drawn, with Blue and Red shockingly being revealed as the teams going to the final Temple of Fate. In the end, Red becomes the fourth and last team eliminated, despite winning the Temple Mission.

==== Ultimate Finale (part 1) ====
In a vote decided by the four eliminated teams, Blue is awarded the Karma pyramid piece, giving them four pieces going into the championship. In the final Endurance: Fiji mission, the Blue and Green teams must compete for the three pieces left behind by Red (Heart, Perseverance and Trust), and the two pieces still in play (Knowledge and Ingenuity). After decorating their huts' dock in memory of their fallen contestants/friends and their time spent on the island, the teams compete in a scavenger hunt for the last five pyramid pieces. Green picks up the Knowledge, Heart and Ingenuity pieces, and Blue finds two clues (to be continued in the finale).

==== Ultimate Finale (part 2) ====
Blue obtains the last two pieces, officially putting them at six (their Strength piece, the Luck piece, Purple's Leadership piece, the Karma piece, Yellow's Perseverance piece and the Trust piece) to Green's eight (their Friendship piece, the Teamwork piece, the Commitment piece, the Discipline piece, Orange's Courage piece, the Knowledge piece, Red's Heart piece and the Ingenuity piece) going into the final competition. Before they exit the camp for the last time, Ben, Jordyn, Leslie and Will are rewarded shell necklaces blessed by the priest, and in the end, the Blue Team wins it all and becomes Endurance Champions, winning the grand prize trip to Australia.

==== Best of Endurance: Fiji ====
J.D. recaps the entire sixth season of Endurance.

==== J.D.'s Greatest Twists ====
J.D. counts down the best five twists in Endurance history.
