= Unanimous (disambiguation) =

Unanimity is agreement by all people in a given situation.

Unanimous may also refer to:

- Unan1mous, a 2006 Fox game show
- Unanimous (British TV series), a 2006 Channel 4 game show, based on the Fox series
