= Top-rated United States television programs of 2005–06 =

This table displays the top-rated primetime television series of the 2005–06 season as measured by Nielsen Media Research.

Rank	Program	Network	Rating
1	American Idol — Tuesday	FOX	17.6
2	American Idol — Wednesday	FOX	17.2
3	CSI: Crime Scene Investigation	CBS	15.6
4	Desperate Housewives	ABC	13.8
5	Grey's Anatomy	ABC	12.5
6	Without a Trace	CBS	12.3
7	Dancing with the Stars	ABC	12.0
8	CSI: Miami	CBS	11.8
9	Monday Night Football	ABC	10.6
9	House	FOX	10.6
11	Survivor	CBS	10.3
12	NCIS	CBS	9.8
13	Two and a Half Men	CBS	9.7
13	The Unit	CBS	9.7
15	Dancing with the Stars — Results	ABC	9.6
15	Deal or No Deal — Monday	NBC	9.6
17	Cold Case	CBS	9.3
18	Lost	ABC	9.2
18	CSI: NY	CBS	9.2
18	Law & Order: Special Victims Unit	NBC	9.2
21	60 Minutes	CBS	9.0
21	Deal or No Deal — Wednesday	NBC	9.0
23	Extreme Makeover: Home Edition	ABC	8.6
24	Commander in Chief	ABC	8.4
25	The New Adventures of Old Christine	CBS	8.3
25	Unan1mous	FOX	8.3
27	Criminal Minds	CBS	8.2
28	24	FOX	8.1
28	ER	NBC	8.1
30	Out of Practice	CBS	7.8
