= Moolah Beach =

US television program

- Show logo
- Created by: Todd Nelson; J. D. Roth
- Starring: Chasati Allen; Summer Borden; Jacob Capito; Nancy Diaz; Brittany Harris; Clark Harrison; A.J Johnson; Shari Lee; Chloe Levenson; Drew Luna; Kyle Searles; Xavier Yepez
- Country of origin: United States
- No. of episodes: 6

Production
- Running time: 30 or 60 minutes (incl. commercials)
- Production company: Big Adventures Productions

Original release
- Network: Fox Kids
- Release: September 8 – November 24, 2001

Related
- Endurance (2002-2008); Karma (2020)

Moolah Beach is a reality show in the vein of Survivor, but with teenagers competing in competitions in order to not be exiled from the beach and ultimately win $25,000. It aired on Fox Kids as a 30-minute show and Fox Family (later shown on ABC Family) as an extended 60-minute show in the late summer/early fall of 2001 for 6 episodes (the entire series was then rerun), with J.D. Roth serving as both host and producer. The show was filmed on Pilaa Beach near Hanalei on the island of Kauai's North Shore.

At the conclusion of the second cycle, a half-hour Moolah Beach: The Reunion special was aired, in which the contestants discussed what they had been doing since the series ended, as well as fielding questions from audience members. At the end of the program, Roth stated that a new season of Moolah Beach would be airing in the summer of 2002, but that never materialized. The format of the show was later reworked into the Discovery Kids series Endurance.

== Contestants ==
The 12 contestants were divided up into the following 6 teams:

| Team | Boy | Hometown | Girl | Hometown | Eliminated |
|---|---|---|---|---|---|
| Blue | Xavier Yepez | Westchester, IL | Chasati Allen | Dolton, IL | 6th |
| Orange | Jacob Capito | Fort Wayne, IN | Chloë Levenson | New York, NY | 5th |
| Yellow | A.J. Johnson | Winter Haven, FL | Brittany Harris | Cocoa Beach, FL | 4th |
| Red | Drew Luna | Lake Mary, FL | Nancy Diaz | Ocala, FL | 3rd |
| Green | Kyle Searles | Frisco, TX | Shari Lee | Bowie, MD | 2nd |
| Purple | Clark Harrison | Schaumburg, IL | Summer Borden | Rowlett, TX | Winners |

== Show format ==
=== Beginning ===
At the beginning of the game, the 12 kids were paired off into six teams of 2 (each composed of one male and one female), determined by a challenge in which the winner got the partner of their choice. At this point, J.D. presented the "Idol Village" which was composed of 13 idols, each one representing one of the gods of Hawaii. Inside one of the idols was the $25,000 grand prize.

=== Missions ===
Like on Endurance, there were two type of challenges: Makahiki Missions and Kahuna Missions.

==== Makahiki Missions ====
Makahiki Missions were usually based on physical strength/endurance. The team that won the challenges won the right to claim 2 of the idols in the game that had not yet been chosen. In addition, they also gained a clue that hints at an idol that did NOT have the grand prize. There were 4 clues in all.

==== Kahuna Missions ====
In Kahuna Missions, the six teams competed in a game of skill to win offerings (colored markers) that would help to keep them on the beach. The first team to finish this game earned 10 offerings to the Great Kahuna, the second-place team earned 5, and each team after that received one fewer than the team preceding it.

=== Great Kahuna ===
The night after a Kahuna Mission, the teams visited The Great Kahuna and brought the offerings they won. Once the offerings were given to The Great Kahuna, the offerings were shuffled and one was drawn. If a team's offering was drawn, that team remained in the game, and their remaining offerings were removed from the Great Kahuna. This process was repeated until one team remained, and they were eliminated from the game. If the eliminated team owned any of the 13 idols in the village, they chose which team would inherit their idols.

=== Finale ===
Once the 13 idols were split between the final two teams, J.D. offered the team that owned the majority of the idols a bribe to give up some of their idols to the other team. He added more prizes to the bribe until either 5 prizes were offered or the leading team accepted. If the leading team flat out refused, the trailing team was given the same offer of the prizes the leading team turned down, possibly adding even more prizes to the bribe, and having to give up fewer idols, since that team were trailing. The team that accepted the bribe kept the prizes even if they did not win the $25,000, and the prizes in the bribe were more expensive as more prizes were added.

Once the bribe was accepted or both teams refused, J.D. revealed the answers to the four idol clues, then began to reveal the other idols that did not have the $25,000. When one idol was left in play for each team, they went to the Great Kahuna for the keys to the two remaining idols. The two idols were opened at the same time, and the team that owned the idol that hid the $25,000 won the money.

The bribe that was accepted in the only season of Moolah Beach was accepted by the Green Team of Kyle and Shari. The prizes in the bribe were the following:

Bribe Prizes
A Sony PlayStation 2 game console and a collection of games
Skiing, skateboarding, and snowboarding equipment
Free McDonald's food for 1 year
A trip to watch the Daytona 500 and meet the drivers
A waverunner

The Purple Team of Summer Borden and Clark Harrison, who owned a majority of the idols, refused this bribe. Kyle and Shari were offered the bribe with the additional prize of an ATV. It was at this point that they accepted the bribe. Kyle and Shari each received all the prizes in the bribe.

Kyle and Shari never had possession of the winning idol, which was Hula. Summer and Clark received the winning idol due to Clark's friendship with Drew. When the Red Team of Nancy Diaz and Drew Luna were eliminated, Drew chose to give the Hula idol to Clark. When Summer and Clark were asked which idols would they have given up if they had taken the bribe (Purple would have had to give Green three of the idols to accept), none were Hula.

Being host/producer of the series, J.D. Roth knew from the beginning which idol hid the money.

== Episode guide ==
=== Episode 1 ===
During the Pakana Ball mission, Xavier was the first person to grab the idol off the pakana ball and chose Chasati as his partner and chose blue as their color. Drew was the second person to grab the idol and chose Nancy as his partner and chose red as their color. A.J. was the third person to grab the idol and chose Brittany as his partner and chose yellow as their color. Summer was the fourth person (and only girl) to grab the idol and chose Clark as her partner and chose purple as their color. Kyle was the fifth and final person to grab the idol and chose Shari as his partner and chose green as their color, which meant that Jacob and Chloe became partners by default and also became the orange team.

=== Episode 2 ===
In the Makahiki Mission, team members had to hang onto a rotating pole, or Pig Spit, while getting sprayed with water by their teammate. Kyle was the last contestant to hang onto the spit, deeming the Green Team the winner. Kyle and Shari were the first to choose two idols – Warrior and Strength. The Kahuna Mission was called Rock the Boat. Everyone ganged up on the Blue Team, who came in last, as a result. In end, the Great Kahuna exiled the Blue Team, Chasati and Xavier, from the beach.

=== Episode 3 ===
Summer and Clark, the Purple Team, won the Makahiki Mission, an obstacle course called Kukini. They chose the Shark and Beach idols. The Green Team, Kyle and Shari, won the Kahuna Mission, called Hula Bridge. In this event, the boys escorted their partners across the water on beams and platforms. Jacob and Chloe, the Orange Team, came in last place. In the end, the Great Kahuna exiled the Orange Team from Moolah Beach.

=== Episode 4 ===
In the Makahiki Mission, "X Marks the Spot", the teams climbed a rope bridge suspended above the water. The Purple Team won and choose Hurricane and Sun idols, giving them a total of four idols. The Green Team won the Kahuna Mission, Ula Maika. In this game, teams got inside huge plastic balls and raced each other, with the Red Team coming in last. Drew and Nancy thought they were doomed to leave, but to everyone's surprise, the Great Kahuna exiled the Yellow Team from the beach instead.

=== Episode 5 ===
The last Makahiki Mission was called "Rope House". Teams had to build a "house" by threading a rope through several posts. Green came in first and chose the Ocean and Fish idols. This time the 2nd place team, Red, got to select one idol. They chose Hula. The final Kahuna Mission was Shark Bait. Teams had to hang onto large posts while suspended over the water. Green came in first place. In the end, the Great Kahuna exiled the Red Team from the beach, and Nancy and Drew gave their idol to the Purple Team.

=== Episode 6 ===
The Green and Purple Teams earned the last four idols in a treasure hunt called "Search for the Lost Idols". Each team won two idols. Purple chose Canoe and Volcano, leaving Green with Fire and Thunder. Purple had a total of seven idols. Green had six. In the Temptation of the Spirits, JD offered the Purple Team prizes if they gave three idols to Green, but they declined. JD offered more prizes to Green, if they gave up two idols. Green accepted and gave Fire and Thunder to Purple. Purple won the moolah, which was inside the Hula idol.

=== Episode 7: The Reunion ===
The 12 contestants returned to talk about their time on the show, as well as answering questions from audience members and discussing what they had been up to since the series ended.

== Idols ==
| Idol | Description |
|---|---|
| Koa | Warrior |
| Lua pele | Volcano |
| Papi'o | Fish |
| Makani pahili | Hurricane |
| Ikaika | Strength |
| Moana | Ocean |
| Kahakai | Beach |
| La'a' | Sun |
| Hekili | Thunder |
| Mano | Shark |
| Mea wa'a | Canoe Building |
| Ahi | Fire |
| Hula* | Dance |

- The Hula idol contained the $25,000 grand prize.

== Sources ==
- Moolah Beach at IMDb
- Official Website
- Pazsaz Entertainment Website
- https://archives.starbulletin.com/2001/07/23/features/story2.html
