= Scooter Magruder =

Internet celebrity, blogger, vlogger, actor, comedian

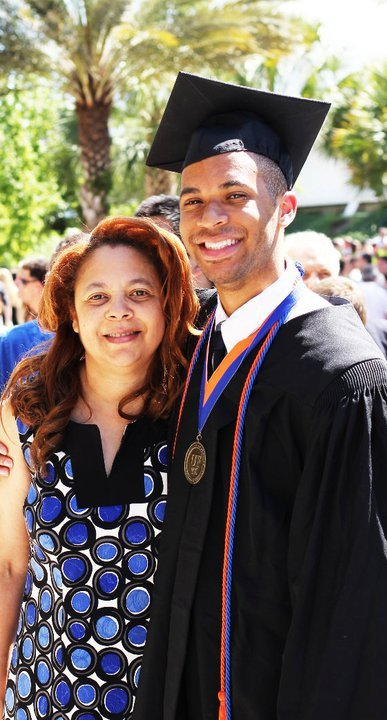
- Magruder with his mother following his graduation from the University of Florida
- Born: Cameron David Magruder; December 2, 1988 (age 37); Orlando, Florida
- Education: University of Florida (B.S.)
- Occupations: YouTube personality, actor, comedian, vlogger, new media consultant
- Years active: 2011–present
- Known for: Comedy, vlogging
- Height: 1.85 m (6 ft 1 in)
- Website: scootermagruder.com

Cameron David "Scooter" Magruder (born December 2, 1988) is an American YouTube personality, actor, comedian and new media consultant. As of October 2021, the videos on his primary account have been viewed over 97 million times with over 603,000 subscribers to his channel.

== Biography ==
Magruder was born in Orlando, Florida.

In the summer of 2003, Magruder was a contestant on the reality show Endurance 2, which aired on NBC & Discovery Kids. The show was taped in Baja California and was hosted by JD Roth. The show prompted Magruder to begin creating videos. It was also during this show where Magruder learned the ins and outs of television production. Magruder and his partner Christa Scholtz competed as the Blue Team and finished in 6th place.

He graduated from Dr. Phillips High School in 2007 as senior class president. He then attended and graduated from the University of Florida cum laude with a degree in telecommunication production. After graduation, Magruder completed one year with Americorps.

== Career ==
Magruder started regularly posting YouTube videos in August 2011. Magruder makes videos on wide ranging topics, including Top 100 videos where he lists 100 things of a certain genre, and his "Not About That Life" series where he rants about things he hates and/or doesn't understand, and multiple other formats, including vlogs, how-to videos, and relationship advice videos. Each video is introduced by Magruder saying "What's up guys, hope you're doing well." Each video ends by him saying his catch phrases: "No Jugamos Juegos" (translated from Spanish meaning "we don't play games") and "Throw me the alley." None of Magruder's videos contain any curse words since he tries to exemplify his Christian values through his videos. Magruder's videos have been posted on the Huffington Post, RightThisMinute, NBATV, ESPN, the Orlando Sentinel, the Miami Herald, and even the Today Show. His most viewed video to date is "Top 100 Things Fortnite Players Say" with over 4,400,000 views.

In the summer of 2012, Magruder was selected to be one of sixteen YouTube Next Vloggers. Vloggers received $5,000 in equipment, $10,000 in YouTube promotional advertisement for their channel, as well as mentoring from other Top Vloggers such as iJustine and Natalie Tran of Community Channel. Sixteen "Next Vloggers" in total were selected from over thousands of applicants worldwide.

Magruder's sports videos form the bulk of his content on YouTube; in 2020, the Orlando Sentinel described him as the "sports comedy YouTube king." He is a fan of the National Basketball Association's Orlando Magic and National Football League's Dallas Cowboys, making videos acting out each fanbase's general reactions to their respective teams during games or major news. His "Stuff _____ fans say" follows a similar model for other teams and sports.

In 2021, Magruder became a part of Clickbait Sports, a weekly show about sports hosted by himself, Five Points Vids, UrinatingTree, Tom Grossi, and That's Good Sports. Episodes are simulcast on Magruder's Twitch, as well as the others' YouTube channels.
