= Animal Planet Zooventure =

- Presented by: J. D. Roth
- Composers: Nancee Kahler McCraw; Mark Gyneth Waldron
- Country of origin: United States
- Original language: English

Production
- Executive producers: Robert Noah; Gaby Johnston
- Running time: approx. 26 minutes
- Production companies: ZooVenture Entertainment; Pearson All American Television (season 2)

Original release
- Network: Animal Planet; Discovery Channel
- Release: March 31, 1997 – 2000

Animal Planet Zooventure is an American children's television game show which originally broadcast on Animal Planet and Discovery Channel from March 31, 1997 to 2000. The show was taped at the San Diego Zoo, and was hosted by J. D. Roth. In the show, four child contestants competed in a series of animal-themed stunts for the grand prize, which is to be a zookeeper for a day.

== Gameplay ==
Four children, one boy and one girl, competed on each episode, to participate in an assortment of animal games, both mentally and physically, as well as answering some questions.

=== Round One ===
The first two contestants played three games. Almost compared to that of Fun House (Roth's 1st show), both contestants participated in a physical stunt about animals, primarily in a 45-second time limit or occasionally to complete an objective. Whoever won that stunt was awarded 10 points. After each game, a viewer at one of the Discovery Channel stores, asked the contestants a true/false question, about an animal behavior, also worth 10 points, where the contestants held up either signs, with either true or false, marked on them, before an answer was revealed. In Season 2, true/false questions were no longer asked by the viewer and Roth (himself) asked a multiple-choice question. Whoever buzzed-in first with a correct answer, scored a point. Incorrect answers locked the player out of the question and gave the opposing player a chance to answer. The player with the most points won. In later episodes of the same season, Roth slowly revealed the picture of an animal and also added letters of the animal's name that are in each of the blanks, and Roth read three clues about the animal. Whoever buzzed-in first with a correct answer, scored a point, albeit, an incorrect answer locked the contestant out and their opponent got a free guess. The player who got both answers, correctly won 10 points.

In Season 1, both contestants were shown a jigsaw puzzle, including a mystery word. Behind the puzzle pieces was an animal and the mystery word was the name of the secret animal. The puzzle pieces were determined by how many letters were in the name of the animal (ex. the blank spaces). Contestants alternated turns drawing yellow balls, from a basket behind them. Each ball corresponds the numbered piece. Each time a contestant drew that ball, the player in control showed the number on the ball, following that piece that was revealed, in addition to the corresponding letter in the name of an animal. Afterwards, the contestant had to buzz-in and guess. Whoever guessed the name of the animal won 20 points, but a wrong answer or if a contestant took too long, passed control to his/her opponent (ex. although it was mandatory to pass, without guessing). The player with the most points, at the end of the first round, advanced to the bonus round, the winner of the first round. If the game is tied, a bonus round typed question was played. A correct answer won the game for the player, an incorrect answer, automatically won the game, for his/her opponents. The winner of the round was the overall winner. That player had to later sit in the chair and wait for the winner of the second round.

=== Round Two ===
Two more contestants also played three games, absolutely the same, as in Round 1. The winner of that stunt won 10 points. Afterwards, an employee of the San Diego Zoo, asked the contestants a multiple-choice question, also worth 10 points. After he/she has read the question to the players, the players held up either sign, with the answer, being marked on them. In Season 2, employees of the San Diego Zoo, were no longer asked the contestants questions, instead, Roth asked a series of rapid-fire questions, of the 9 habits and/or things relating to the animal, itself and contestants buzzed-in and guessed the habit and/or a thing of the animal. A correct answer earned that contestant a point. The round was played for 30 seconds (originally 45), and the contestant with the most correct answers, when time ran out won 10 points. If the game was tied, they both get 10 points.

Both players went to the board with seven animal answers, being marked on them. Only 3 of the 7 fit, in the category read by Roth, at the beginning of the game, each day. The contestants alternated turns, by selecting the answer that best fits the category. Whoever scored two out of the three answers, wins 20 points. If there was a tie, at the end of the game, then Roth showed the contestant one final correct or incorrect answer and had to decide if it fits the category or not. A correct response gave both contestants 20 points, if a player missed a question, then, only the person who got the first two right answers get 20 points, alone. In Season 2, both contestants went on a Field Trip, and had to watch and listened to the entire clip about the animal's habits, behavior and things. Once the video was over, both of them were given 20 seconds (originally 30) to match each and every one of those habits, behavior and things of an animal, on the board. After each statement, they weren't allowed to make any changes (ex. time would have ran out, if they did, though in earlier episodes, they needed to make any changes, if time permitted). When time ran out, Roth went over to each of the contestants' boards and found out how well they matched. Whoever matched the most habits about an animal, won the game and 10 points. If there was a tie, a true/false tie-breaker question will be asked. A contestant who answered correctly won the game, but a contestant who answered incorrectly, their opponent automatically won the game.

== Bonus Round ==
Both contestants who won their rounds were shown a series of secret animal names, with the comparison of both the Scrabble round of Speedword and the Wheel of Fortune round of Toss-up. While Roth read the clues, letters in order, from left to right were revealed, one at a time, and either contestant buzzed-in. A correct answer scored a point, albeit, an incorrect answer or failure to give an answer, gave the opponent a free guess, along with one extra letter and a clue. If their opponent came up with a wrong answer, on a steal, continued the word, until somebody guessed right. The round was played for 60 seconds, whoever had the most points, when time ran out won. If the round ended in a tie, one last puzzle was played. A correct answer, from the contestant, won the game, but an incorrect answer, from a contestant, locked that player out of the game, and their opponent got a free guess. The winning contestant won grand prizes, in addition to being Zookeeper For a Day, at the San Diego Zoo and Wild Animal Park. In Season 2, the bonus round had changed; instead of both contestants guessing answers, the two contestants who have won their rounds, competed in a Zoofari Challenge, where they had to race through an obstacle course, with the first contestant to cross the finish line. The contestant not only won the grand prize, but also became Zookeeper For A Day, at the San Diego Zoo and Wild Animal Park.

== Audience Game ==
In Season 1, at the end of the show, members of the studio audience answered a question for a prize.
