= Wait 'til This Year =

- DVD cover
- Produced by: Monika Lahiri
- Starring: Monika Lahiri
- Release date: 2004
- Country: United States
- Language: English

Wait 'til This Year is a reality-type docu-drama film which follows a Boston Red Sox fan during the 2004 baseball season, when the team ended their famous losing streak by winning the World Series. The film was aired on New England Sports Network (NESN) and then released on DVD afterward. Monika Lahiri starred (as the "character" Monika) and produced the film, which combines reality, documentary and scripted scenes when following the events from the perspective of Monika.

In the film Monika and her husband Jes (played by Ges Selmont) are diehard Sox fans. Friends Rob and Alex, have a conflict, because one is a Yankees fan, and one a Sox fan.

== Cast ==
The "cast" includes those playing scripted fictional roles, while also including persons who appear as themselves, such former Red Sox star players, who made cameo appearances as themselves.

- Monika Lahiri - Monika, lead character and wife of Jes.
- Ges Selmont - Ges, husband of Monika.
- Chris Kies - Rob, a Sox fan, and friend of Alex.
- Stephen Kunken - Alex, a Yankees fan, and friend of Rob.
- Rich Coppola - Himself, TV sports director at Connecticut's WTIC FOX 61
- Tony Terzi - Himself, sports reporter
- Jim Rice - Himself, former Sox player.
- Dwight Evans - Himself, former Sox player.
- Bill Lee - Himself, a former Sox player
- Carl Yastrzemski - Himself, former Sox player.
- Julie Dubela - Herself, national anthem singer
