= Endurance (TV series) =

American reality TV series

- Logo for Endurance: Hawaii
- Created by: J. D. Roth; Todd A. Nelson
- Presented by: J. D. Roth
- Country of origin: United States
- Original language: English
- No. of seasons: 6
- No. of episodes: 86 + 19 specials (list of episodes)

Production
- Running time: 24 minutes
- Production companies: 3Ball Productions; 90266 Productions Inc.

Original release
- Network: Discovery Kids
- Release: October 5, 2002 – June 28, 2008

Related
- Moolah Beach (2001); Karma (2020)

Endurance is an American reality television series, previously shown on the Discovery Kids cable network in the United States and also on networks in other countries. The show's format is somewhat similar to the television series Survivor, with a teenage cast. Endurance contestants live in a remote location and participate in various mental and physical challenges, although Endurance contestants compete as pairs (one boy and one girl), and the outcome of the competitions determines which pair of players is eliminated.

In its six-year run between 2002 through 2008, each season began with a new slate of contestants, who were gradually eliminated as the season progressed until the remaining two teams competed to get all of the Endurance Pyramid pieces. The winning boy and girl received an all-expenses paid vacation package with their parents to an exotic location as the prize.

Production ended with the final episode of the sixth season, first aired on June 28, 2008. After the series ended, reruns continued to air on Hub Network until July 21, 2013. The first four seasons of the show also aired on NBC on Saturday mornings under the Discovery Kids on NBC umbrella from 2002 to 2006. Three seasons of Endurance (Hawaii, Tehachapi and High Sierras) were each nominated for a Daytime Emmy Award in the category of "Outstanding Children's Series".

== Production ==
The show was produced by 3Ball Productions. Its co-creator, former actor and children's game show presenter, J. D. Roth, is the executive producer and on-screen host. Roth received a Daytime Emmy nomination in 2006 as "Outstanding Performer in a Children's Series" for Endurance: Tehachapi.

Contestants ages 12–15 were chosen each spring from five-minute audition tapes sent in by more than 12,000 teens to the show's production team. Twenty players were selected to participate in each of the first five seasons of Endurance; this was reduced to sixteen in Season 6. In a 2004 newspaper interview, Roth revealed that he looked for as diverse a group as possible. Shooting of the series took place each summer over a three-week period and began with the selected teenaged contestants arriving at a secret remote location in late July. Each season was taped in a different location, including California, Hawaii, Mexico, and Fiji.

In a January 2007, interview with the Boston Globe, Connor Finnegan recalled his experience as an Endurance: High Sierras player the previous summer: "At first it was weird being filmed all the time. You'd be talking and suddenly there would be a camera or microphone shoved into your face. The big rule with reality TV is never to look at the camera."

As part of the show, host J.D. Roth and the players sometimes discuss the interpersonal drama occurring among the teams. Roth has said that many participants have become close friends while the series was being shot, learning tolerance for people who were different from themselves. The Boston Globe reported that there was friction among the players on Endurance: High Sierras following the controversial break-up of teams. Finnegan's mother said, "There was definitely some nastiness", complaining that the producers and writers, "deliberately put the kids in situations that are designed to increase the drama and tension". But, Taylor Sico-McNulty, another Endurance: High Sierras contestant from Massachusetts and Finnegan's partner, said that when she returned home following the show's California taping, she "really missed seeing all the other kids in the cast every day", adding that a number of player reunions have since been held. Another player from the fifth season, Dakota Fisher of Eliot, Maine, echoed the feeling, saying that his appearance on Endurance left him with relationships he will never forget. "You should have seen me a week after the show, it was depressing", said the 15-year-old who had been trying for two years to get on the Emmy-nominated teen reality program.

Roth said in a 2007 news release, "Being on Endurance is a life-altering experience for every kid who is selected. With only the sun, moon, stars and each other, these kids have no choice but to get to really know each other. They learn to dig deep within themselves when someone says they can’t do something. They learn to overcome first impressions and prejudice and they build tremendous self-confidence by tapping into skills they never even knew they had."

Endurance is the successor to Moolah Beach, a show created by Roth which was not renewed after its single 2001 season, when a change in ownership of Fox Family Channel opened up a new offer from Discovery Kids for a reality series. From 2002 until 2006, Endurance was also broadcast on the NBC network as part of its Saturday morning Discovery Kids on NBC block of programs.

=== Locations ===
Country/Region	Locations (season number)
North America (5)	California (1, 4, 5), Mexico (2), Hawaii (3)
Oceania (1)	Fiji (6)

== The contests ==
=== The Right to Stay Challenge ===
Shortly after they arrive, the group of 20 contestants competes in the first Endurance game, called the Right to Stay Challenge. As the name implies, this game eliminates a group of contestants from continuing any further in the game. The game is normally a test of endurance, where each contestant has to hold on to something such as a bar or a pole for as long as possible. In Seasons 1 through 4, the first three girls and the first three boys to let go were eliminated. In Season 5, the game was a test of balance and speed, and the last two boys and last two girls to finish the game were eliminated. In Season 6, the first two boys and two girls to let go of a rope were eliminated, winnowing the sixteen hopefuls to twelve contestants who earned the right to stay, forming six teams of players.

In Season 3, the eliminated players were brought back the following day to compete in a second chance Right to Stay game. The winner of this game (Tom) chose his partner from the group of girls (Vanetta), forming the Brown team.

In Seasons 3 and 5 the group was required to choose two players (a boy and a girl) who were allowed to sit out the Right To Stay Challenge, automatically advancing as if they had survived the challenge. In season 3 the boys were required to choose one girl to be safe and the girls were required to save a boy, the boys saved Lindi and the girls chose Reece because they were the most attractive in their opinions. In season 5, Darci and Aric were selected to sit out. They were then each allowed to save one other person (of the same gender). Darci chose Kelsey, Aric chose Alex.

=== Choosing teams ===
The day after the Right To Stay Challenge, the remaining players compete in another game to determine teams. Each team consists of one boy and one girl. The game and the rules vary from year to year. The team colors are red, orange, yellow, green, blue, purple and gray (brown is added in seasons with 8 teams and is removed in seasons with 7 teams). In season 6, there is no gray team.

After the teams are decided, they each receive one pyramid piece of the Endurance Pyramid. To win the game and the grand prize trip, one team must possess all of the pieces. (10 pieces in the first season, 12 in Seasons 2 and 3, 13 in Seasons 4 and 5, and 14 in Season 6).

=== Endurance Mission ===
With the teams now assigned, they begin competing in Endurance Missions. This is usually a test of skill. The team that wins the Endurance Mission wins a Samadhi that contains something that will have a negative effect on one team during the Temple Mission that the winning team gets to give to any team to play with its effect. The winners of the Endurance Mission also receive a pyramid piece. However, it is customary, that when three teams remain, the winners of the Samadhi have the right to not give its effect to a team, leaving a level playing field for the final Temple Mission.

=== Samadhi ===
The teams compete for a Samadhi fairly often through the entire game. (Note: Samadhi is Sanskrit for "contemplation") All of them but two had a negative impact on another team. In Season 3 (Endurance Hawaii) there was a Samadhi that benefitted the team that it was given to. Chris and Lindi (the Gray Team) won that Samadhi, and decided to keep it. It gave them the option to switch teams or to take all the pieces from one team, which they did to the Yellow Team. In Season 5, the Blue team won the power to switch two teams around. In Season 1 the team that won the Samadhi at the Final 3 stage chose to eliminate it from the game. In Season 2, the team that won the Samadhi at the Final 4 stage chose to eliminate it from the game as well. This pattern was broken in Season 3, however. Also, in Season 5, the first Samadhi (won in the mission "Hot Potato") was the ability to make two players switch teams or give another team the power to make the switch. Taylor and Isaac, the original Blue team, won this Samadhi. They gave it to the Red team, who used it to switch Connor onto the Blue team and Isaac onto the Gray team. The first time the Samadhi was introduced, J.D. explained that the word Samadhi is the Buddhist word for "contemplation."

=== Temple mission ===
This mission is usually one of endurance (hence the show's title). The team that wins a Temple Mission usually earns the right to choose two other teams to send to the "Temple of Fate", the elimination challenge.

=== Temple of Fate ===
The two teams sent to the Temple of Fate bring with them all pyramid pieces they have won up to that point. In a variant of the Rock, Paper, Scissors intransitive game, the teams select water, wood, or fire to defeat one another in a best 2 out of 3 match, e.g.,

- Water puts out Fire (Water wins)
- Wood floats on Water (Wood wins)
- Fire burns Wood (Fire wins)

The first team to win two rounds wins the challenge and the right to stay in the game. The losers are immediately eliminated. In Season 1, the losing team's pieces went to the team winning the next episode's challenge; in all subsequent seasons, the losing team gave their pyramid pieces to any team of their choice, with a farewell note read to the remaining contestants.

=== Pyramid pieces ===
The pyramid pieces play an important part in the game, since one team must possess all of the pieces to win the game. Season 1 had 10, Seasons 2 and 3 had 12, Seasons 4 and 5 had 13, and Season 6 has 14.

Pyramid piece	First used during
Commitment	Season 1
Courage	Season 1
Discipline	Season 1
Leadership	Season 1
Luck	Season 1
Perseverance	Season 1
Strength	Season 1
Heart	Season 1
Knowledge	Season 1
Trust	Season 1
Ingenuity	Season 2
Teamwork	Season 2
Friendship	Season 4*
Karma	Season 6*

* Introduced in the Finale of the prior season.

=== Golden Triangle of Immunity ===
In Season 5, the Golden Triangle of Immunity was added. It is a border that is placed around the Friendship piece. It may be transferred to another team with any temple mission. In Season 5 the Triangle of Immunity was given to the Purple Team of: Dakota Fisher and Kelsey Schultz, by Anna and Garret. The team in possession of the Triangle of Immunity can avoid being sent to temple once, but is only able to use it until the final four. Once they reach the final three, the Triangle of Immunity is removed from the game. Season 6 removed the Triangle of Immunity, as the Friendship piece is back to a regular pyramid piece.

=== Magic Box ===
In Season 6, a new aspect of Endurance called the Magic Box was introduced. This is a challenge where teams compete for the chance to gain an advantage over the other teams. Leslie Powell and Will Cuddy (the Green team) won the first Magic Box in the episode "Mana Kisi". Inside, the Magic Box contained one free round at the Temple of Fate, to be used before the Temple of Fate challenge begins. In addition to winning a Magic Box, teams are allowed to do what they want with the information given. They decided to lie about it. In the end when the Green Team was sent up to temple with their friends the Orange Team, they used their advantage against them and sent the Orange Team home.

=== The Final Challenge ===
For the Final Challenge, both teams go to the Temple of Fate with all the pieces they have won. These pieces are now used as chips to play a shell game type challenge.

The team with fewer pieces starts by placing pieces by a group of pyramids, one of which has the gold pyramid under it. That team may claim as many as it wishes but must leave at least one pyramid unclaimed. The team with more pieces must claim the pyramids that its opponent did not claim. At this point, the gold pyramid is revealed, and the team that has claimed it wins all the pieces that were played on the board. If teams have the same number of pieces the team that had fewer pieces the round before places first. If teams are tied in first round, the team that won the final mission places their pieces first

There are three pyramids to start the game, and one more is added every round thereafter. The team that gets all the pyramid pieces wins the challenge, the game and the grand prize trip.

== Episodes ==
Season	Episodes	Originally released	
Season	Episodes	First released	Last released
1	13	October 5, 2002	February 22, 2003
2	14	September 27, 2003	February 28, 2004
3	18	September 25, 2004	February 19, 2005
4	14	October 1, 2005	March 25, 2006
5	14	October 14, 2006	March 17, 2007
6	12	October 13, 2007	March 8, 2008

=== Season 1 - Endurance (2002–03) ===
The premiere season was taped in the summer of 2002 on Parsons Beach on Catalina Island, California. Each of the seven teams played for one of seven grand prize trips.

The Blue team of Aaron Thornburg and Jonna Mannion won their grand prize trip, which was a trip to the Amazon*.

Mannion was also a participant on the show The Real World: Cancun and its spin-off show The Challenge on MTV. She was also on the TruTv series Rehab: Party at the Hard Rock Hotel as a cocktail waitress. She was also featured in the LMFAO music video for "La La La".

Skyler Russell was featured on A&E's Intervention (season 12, episode 8) in which he is battling an addiction to bath salts in an attempt to distance himself from his stage mother who pushed him into show business. He died on October 16, 2020, after suffering from a brain infection and organ failure caused by alcohol withdrawal.

The season consisted of seven teams (in order of elimination):

Position	Team	Boy		Age	Girl		Age	Starting Piece(s)	Trip	Temple Winner	Piece(s) Won by	Pieces Held
Position	Team	Name	Hometown	Age	Name	Hometown	Age	Starting Piece(s)	Trip	Temple Winner	Piece(s) Won by	Pieces Held
7th	Gray	Max DeLeo	Los Angeles	14	Jenna Jimenez	Rogers Park, IL	14	Heart and Trust	Galapagos Islands	Green	Yellow	2
6th	Purple	Brandon Hendrix	Winter Park, FL	14	Layla Brisco	Gardena, CA	14	Strength	Costa Rica	Orange	Yellow	1
5th	Orange	Skyler Russell	Phoenix, AZ	14	Chelsea Myers	Apache Junction, AZ	14	Luck	Bali & Komodo	Green	Green	1
4th	Green	Trevor Wilkins	Chicago, IL	12	Lana Neiman	Lincoln Park, IL	14	Commitment	Amazon*	Yellow	Blue	2
3rd	Red	Christian Justice	San Clemente, CA	15	Ashley Gudzak	Jacksonville, FL	14	Leadership	Australia	Yellow	Yellow	1
2nd	Yellow	Jon Crocilla	Chicago, IL	15	Sabrina Lloyd	Sugar Land, TX	15	Perseverance	Belize	Blue (Finale)		5
Winner	Blue	Aaron Thornburg	Bozeman, MT	15	Jonna Mannion	Chandler, AZ	13	Courage	Africa			10

Right-to-Stay Eliminations

Boy			Girl		
Name	Hometown	Age	Name	Hometown	Age
Shane Peltzman	Huntingdon Valley, PA	13	Lacey Elick	Bellville, TX	14
Ron Neurauter	Glen Ellyn, IL	15	Heather Ichihashi	Brooklyn, NY	14
Alejandro Rose-Garcia	Austin, TX	15	Cree Howard	Bozeman, MT	15

==== Elimination table ====
Contestants	Episodes											
Contestants	1	2	3	4	5	6	7	8	9	10	11 ^{3}	12
Aaron & Jonna	WIN^{1}	WIN	SAFE	SAFE	SAFE	WIN	SAMADHI	WIN	WIN	WIN	LOSE	FIRST
Jon & Sabrina	SAFE	SAFE	WIN	SAFE	WIN	SAFE	SAFE	TEMPLE	SAFE^{2}	TEMPLE	WIN	SECOND
Christian & Ashley	SAFE	SAFE	SAFE	WIN	SAFE	SAFE	SAFE	SAFE	SAFE	OUT		
Trevor & Lana	SAFE	TEMPLE	SAFE	SAFE	SAFE	TEMPLE	WIN	OUT				
Skyler & Chelsea	SAMADHI	SAFE	SAFE	TEMPLE	SAMADHI	OUT						
Brandon & Layla	SAFE	SAFE	SAMADHI	OUT								
Max & Jenna	SAFE	OUT										

Key
(FIRST) The team won the Final Temple Mission and became “Endurance” Champions.
(SECOND) The team lost the Final Temple Mission and were the runners-up.
(WIN) The team won the Endurance Mission, the previously eliminated team's pyramid pieces, and the Samadhi.
(WIN) The team won the Temple Mission.
(SAMADHI) The team was handicapped with the Samadhi by the winning team.
(SAFE) The team did not win the challenge, but was safe from going to Temple or did not receive the Samadhi.
(TEMPLE) The team won at the Temple of Fate and avoided elimination.
(OUT) The team lost at the Temple of Fate and was eliminated.
Notes

- ^{1}In "Tilt", the winning team, in this case the Blue team, won the two remaining pyramid pieces that were not in play after the "Fate Falls" challenge.
- ^{2} The Yellow team would have received the Samadhi, but the Blue team decided to take it out of the game.
- ^{3}In “Don't Drop the Ball”, the only prize up for grabs was the pyramid piece left behind by the Red team.

==== Challenges ====
1. Tilt
2. Knotted Up
3. Plant the Flag
4. Squeeze Play
5. Water Logged
6. Eruption
7. House of Cards
8. Dial In
9. Build a Pyramid
10. Leap of Fate
11. Don't Drop the Ball
12. Final Temple

=== Season 2 - Endurance 2 (2003–04) ===
Endurance 2 was taped in Baja California, near the resort town of La Paz, Mexico. An unusual twist in this season was the return of Jenna and Max, who were previously eliminated in season one, chosen to become the Brown Team from an alumni vote of Season 1 contestants who reunited at a reunion. One contestant, 14-year-old Tyler Burkhalter, competed despite having diabetes requiring daily insulin treatments.

In the end, Max DeLeo and Jenna Jimenez won the game, earning the grand prize trip to Atlantis Paradise Island in the Bahamas.

This season consisted of eight teams (in order of elimination):

Position	Team	Boy		Age	Girl		Age	Starting Piece	Temple Winner	Piece(s) Awarded to	Pieces Held
Position	Team	Name	Hometown	Age	Name	Hometown	Age	Starting Piece	Temple Winner	Piece(s) Awarded to	Pieces Held
8th	Gray	Wayne Williams	Bloomfield, NJ	15	Maryelle DeVitto	Winter Park, FL	14	Heart	Orange	Purple	1
7th	Red	Phil Morelli	Denver, CO	14	Jacquelynn Pointer	Silver Spring, MD	13	Discipline	Orange	Blue	1
6th	Blue	Scooter Magruder	Orlando, FL	14	Christa Scholtz	Austin, TX	13	Trust	Purple	Purple	2
5th	Yellow	Shep Allen	Wayzata, MN	14	Calley Payne	Elberton, GA	15	Commitment	Brown	Brown	1
4th	Purple	Jeff Phillips	Sanger, CA	15	Annie Kim	Bethesda, MD	15	Leadership	Brown	Orange	6
3rd	Orange	Tyler Burkhalter	Jacksonville, FL	14	Michelle Durand	Linden, NJ	14	Knowledge	Green		8
2nd	Green	Mike Lavigne	Shelton, CT	15	Keetin Marchi	Fairfax, VA	14	Teamwork	Brown (Finale)		5
Winner	Brown	Max DeLeo	Los Angeles	15	Jenna Jimenez	Rogers Park, IL	15	Perseverance			12

Right-to-Stay Eliminations

Boy			Girl		
Name	Hometown	Age	Name	Hometown	Age
David Cofresi	Clermont, FL	14	Sarah Ruckriegle	Breckenridge, CO	14
Glen Powell	Austin, TX	14	Abbey Konz	Humble, TX	14
Trey Griffin	Sebring, FL	14	Simone Bouffard	Antioch, CA	15

Their eliminations did not affect the arrival of Max and Jenna as the Brown team, who arrived after the formation of the seven official teams.

==== Elimination table ====
Contestants	Episodes											
Contestants	1	2	3	4	5	6	7	8	9	10	11 ^{2}	12
Max & Jenna	SAFE	SAFE	SAFE	WIN	WIN	SAMADHI	TEMPLE	SAFE	TEMPLE	WIN	WIN (4)	FIRST
Mike & Keetin	WIN	SAFE	WIN	SAFE	SAFE	SAFE	SAFE	SAFE^{1}	WIN	TEMPLE	WIN (4)	SECOND
Tyler & Michelle	TEMPLE	SAMADHI	TEMPLE	SAFE	SAFE	SAFE	SAFE	WIN	SAFE	OUT		
Jeff & Annie	SAFE	WIN	SAFE	SAFE	TEMPLE	WIN	WIN	SAFE	OUT			
Shep & Calley	SAFE	SAFE	SAFE	SAFE	SAFE	SAFE	OUT					
Scooter & Christa	SAFE	SAFE	SAFE	SAMADHI	OUT							
Phil & Jacquelynn	SAFE	SAFE	OUT									
Wayne & Maryelle	OUT											

Key
(FIRST) The team won the Final Temple Mission and became “Endurance” Champions.
(SECOND) The team lost the Final Temple Mission and were the runners-up.
(WIN) The team won the Endurance Mission and the Samadhi.
(WIN) The team won the Temple Mission.
(SAMADHI) The team was handicapped with the Samadhi by the winning team.
(SAFE) The team did not win the challenge, but was safe from going to Temple or did not receive the Samadhi.
(TEMPLE) The team won at the Temple of Fate and avoided elimination.
(OUT) The team lost at the Temple of Fate and was eliminated.

Notes

- ^{1} The Green team would have received the Samadhi, but the Orange team decided to take it out of the game.
- ^{2} In the final challenge, the Brown and Green teams competed for the eight pieces left behind by the Orange team. Each team won four pieces.

==== Challenges ====
1. Tower of Power
2. Fireball
3. Rollerball
4. Tide Pull
5. On the Ropes
6. Face to Face
7. Cherry Picker
8. Aqueduct
9. Plank Maze
10. Pathfinder
11. Final Mission
12. Final Temple

=== Season 3 - Endurance 3: Hawaii (2004–05) ===
Moving to Wainiha Valley, Kauaʻi, Hawaii, for the third season, a number of production problems were encountered, including difficulties in obtaining location permits, torrential rains, muddy conditions, and mosquitoes. It had 21 episodes including casting specials showing the selection process. One of the contestants, Rachel Lofton of the Red team, is the daughter of Pro Football Hall of Famer and San Diego Chargers coach James Lofton. There were many twists including bringing back six eliminated players, after the right to stay, to compete in a challenge to become an official endurance player. The winner would choose someone from the opposite sex and they would become the Brown Team. Tom won and chose Vanetta as his partner. Later, Vanetta injured her knee: while walking outside of her hut and stepping down, she cut her leg on a piece of bamboo. The cut required more than 20 stitches, and she was removed from the game, making Tom the first person in Endurance to be a one-person team. Also, he was the first person to go to the Temple of Fate without a partner.

In the end, the Gray team of Chris Vanderwier and Lindi Oest won, with a trip to the Galápagos Islands as their prize.

This was the only season to see the Gray team continue on past the first temple elimination. There was also a special program at the conclusion of the season showing winners Chris Vanderweir and Lindi Oest enjoying their trip to the Galápagos Islands.

After the season, Vanetta Smith of the Brown team starred in the movie Freedom Writers.

Kareem Nugent was on BET during the BET Split Ya Game contest as his named was Karma .

Demian Martinez was a contestant on The N's reality show Girls v. Boys Puerto Rico and also appeared during one episode of Scare Tactics after being set up by his mom.

In 2012, Tom Maden played Rigo in season 3 of the ABC Family show Make It or Break It and starred as Jake Fitzgerald in the MTV series Scream.

In November 2015, Alex Reid joined BP RaNia, a South Korean girl group.

The eight teams competing were (in order of elimination):

Position	Team	Boy		Age	Girl		Age	Starting Piece	Temple Winner	Piece(s) Awarded to	Pieces Held
Position	Team	Name	Hometown	Age	Name	Hometown	Age	Starting Piece	Temple Winner	Piece(s) Awarded to	Pieces Held
8th	Blue	Antonio Iannicelli	Wellesley, MA	14	Willa Zhou	Seattle, WA	15	Commitment	Orange	Orange	1
7th	Green	Bjorn Leum	Ennis, MT	15	Alex Reid	Plano, TX	15	Heart	Yellow	Yellow	1
6th	Red	Kareem Nugent	Bronx, NY	15	Rachel Lofton	Poway, CA	13	Trust	Brown	Purple	1
5th	Brown	Tom Maden	Coppell, Texas	15	Vanetta Smith	Cleveland, OH	14	Perseverance	Yellow	Yellow	1
4th	Purple	Reece Bors	Shelbyville, KY	14	Sarah Baker	Downers Grove, IL	13	Discipline	Gray	Gray	3
3rd	Yellow	Monroe Gierl	Glendale, WI	15	Bryanah Bascon	Stoughton, MA	14	Teamwork	Gray		2
2nd	Orange	Demian Martinez	Las Vegas, NV	15	Nicole Clark	Los Angeles	14	Leadership	Gray (Finale)		2
Winner	Gray	Chris Vanderwier	St. Augustine, FL	15	Lindi Oest	Tampa, FL	13	Knowledge			12

Right-to-Stay Eliminations

Boy			Girl		
Name	Hometown	Age	Name	Hometown	Age
Marshall Katheder	Orlando, FL	14	Taylor Madison	Dallas, TX	15
Brandon Johnson	Lithonia, GA	13	Eleanor Monahan	Hyde Park, MA	14

==== Elimination table ====
Contestants	Episodes													
Contestants	1	2	3	4	5	6^{2}	7	8	9	10	11	12	13^{4}	14
Chris & Lindi	SAFE	SAFE	SAFE	SAFE	WIN	WIN	WIN	SAFE	SAMADHI	TEMPLE	WIN	TEMPLE	WIN (2)	FIRST
Demian & Nicole	SAFE	TEMPLE	WIN	SAFE	SAFE	SAFE	SAFE	SAFE	SAFE	WIN	SAFE	WIN	LOSE (0)	SECOND
Monroe & Bryanah	SAMADHI	WIN	TEMPLE	WIN^{1}	WIN	SAMADHI	SAMADHI	TEMPLE	WIN	SAFE	SAMADHI	OUT		
Reece & Sarah	WIN	SAFE	SAFE	SAFE	WIN	SAFE	SAFE	WIN	SAFE	OUT				
Tom & Vanetta	SAFE	SAFE	SAFE	SAFE	TEMPLE	SAFE	SAFE	OUT						
Kareem & Rachel	SAFE	SAFE	SAFE	SAFE	OUT									
Bjorn & Alex	SAFE	SAFE	OUT											
Antonio & Willa	SAFE	OUT												

Key
(FIRST) The team won the Final Temple Mission and became “Endurance” Champions.
(SECOND) The team lost the Final Temple Mission and were the runners-up.
(WIN) The team won the Endurance Mission, the previously eliminated team's pyramid pieces, and the Samadhi.
(WIN) The team won the Temple Mission.
(SAMADHI) The team was handicapped with the Samadhi by the winning team.
(SAFE) The team did not win the challenge, but was safe from going to Temple or did not receive the Samadhi.
(TEMPLE) The team won at the Temple of Fate and avoided elimination.
(OUT) The team lost at the Temple of Fate and was eliminated.
(OUT) This team/person was removed from the game due to injury before they were sent to temple.

Notes

- ^{1} In "Out on a Limb" there was no Samadhi to give to another team, nor did the winning team win a pyramid piece. The winning team (Yellow) got the chance to create two super-teams. The Yellow team created their super-team of Yellow, Grey, and Purple. The second super-team was Orange, Brown, and Red. The winning super-team members were all safe from going to the Temple of Fate.
- ^{2} The Samahdi won by the Grey team in the endurance challenge allowed them to steal another team's pieces. The Grey team chose to steal the Yellow team's two pieces.
- ^{3} Due to Vanetta's removal from the game, Tom was eliminated at the Temple of Fate alone.
- ^{4} The final challenge, the Grey and Orange teams competed for the two pieces left behind by the Yellow team. The Grey team won both pieces.

==== Challenges ====
1. Ring of Fire
2. Bagging on You
3. Squaring Off
4. Out on a Limb
5. Bamboo Jungle
6. Pipeline
7. I'm Pulling for You
8. Balance Ball
9. Tri Try Again
10. You're Fired
11. Create Your Own Game
12. Color Coded
13. Battle for the Pieces
14. Final Temple

=== Season 4 - Endurance: Tehachapi (2005–06) ===
Returning to California for the next two seasons, Endurance: Tehachapi was taped in the Tehachapi Mountains at Tejon Ranch in the summer of 2005 for airing beginning that Fall. A 13th pyramid piece, Friendship, was added this season. The Red team of Franke Sisto and Erika Cook won the grand prize, a trip to Costa Rica.

Julie Dubela appeared on American Juniors in 2003 and auditioned for American Idol. Jeszie Geronimo appeared on TKO: Total Knock Out in 2018.

==== Contestants and teams ====
There was no Brown team this season, which meant only seven teams competed:

Position	Team	Boy		Age	Girl		Age	Starting Piece	Temple Winner	Piece(s) Awarded to	Pieces Held
Position	Team	Name	Hometown	Age	Name	Hometown	Age	Starting Piece	Temple Winner	Piece(s) Awarded to	Pieces Held
7th	Gray	John Kardian	Westchester, NY	15	Julie Dubela	Stratham, NH	14	Commitment	Blue	Blue	1
6th	Yellow	Chris Tavarez	Atlanta, GA	12	Callie Simpkins	Frederick, MD	14	Trust	Red	Red	1
5th	Orange	Michael Delvecchio	Bailey, CO	15	Kylie Glessman	Simpsonville, SC	15	Knowledge	Purple	Red	1
4th	Blue	Shea Thomas	Douglasville, GA	15	Amelia Land	Macon, GA	15	Courage	Red	Green	2
3rd	Green	Isaac Hainley	Portland, OR	15	Jeszie Geronimo	Boston, MA	15	Leadership	Purple		6
2nd	Purple	Jonathan Lebowitz	New York, NY	15	Daniela Bustamente	Boca Raton, FL	14	Perseverance	Red (Finale)		6
Winner	Red	Franke Sisto	Sewell, NJ	15	Erika Cook	Lake Forest, CA	15	Heart			13

Right-to-Stay Eliminations

Boy			Girl		
Name	Hometown	Age	Name	Hometown	Age
Nick Verderosa	Bethel, CT	15	Brittany Harvey	Slidell, LA	15
Tucker Baer	Littleton, CO	15	Kendall Yorkey	Menomonee Falls, WI	14
Keith Walker II	Chandler, AZ	14	Brooke Bellows	Maitland, FL	14

==== Elimination table ====
Contestants	Episodes											
Contestants	1	2	3	4	5^{2}	6	7	8	9	10	11^{3}	12
Franke & Erika	SAFE	SAFE	WIN^{1}	TEMPLE	SAMADHI	SAFE	SAMADHI	TEMPLE	SAFE	WIN	WIN (3)	FIRST
Jonathan & Daniela	SAFE	WIN	SAFE	WIN	TEMPLE	TEMPLE	SAFE	WIN	WIN	TEMPLE	WIN (4)	SECOND
Isaac & Jeszie	WIN	SAFE	SAFE	SAFE	WIN	WIN	WIN	SAFE	SAMADHI	OUT		
Shea & Amelia	SAFE	TEMPLE	SAFE	WIN	SAFE	SAFE	SAFE	OUT				
Michael & Kylie	SAFE	SAFE	SAFE	WIN	SAFE	OUT						
Chris & Callie	SAFE	SAFE	SAFE	OUT								
John & Julie	SAMADHI	OUT										

Key
(FIRST) The team won the Final Temple Mission and became “Endurance” Champions.
(SECOND) The team lost the Final Temple Mission and were the runners-up.
(WIN) The team won the Endurance Mission, the previously eliminated team's pyramid pieces, and the Samadhi.
(WIN) The team won the Temple Mission.
(SAMADHI) The team was handicapped with the Samadhi by the winning team.
(SAFE) The team did not win the challenge, but was safe from going to Temple or did not receive the Samadhi.
(TEMPLE) The team won at the Temple of Fate and avoided elimination.
(TEMPLE) The team came in last place during the Endurance mission and was forced to go to Temple in the next episode.
(OUT) The team lost at the Temple of Fate and was eliminated.

Notes

- ^{1}In "Drop Out," there was no Samadhi to give to another team. The winning team (Red) got the chance to create two super-teams. The Red team created their super-team of Red, Green, and Yellow. The second super-team was Blue, Purple, and Orange. The winning super-team members were all safe from going to the Temple of Fate.
- ^{2}In "Waterworks," the Purple Team was forced to go to Temple of Fate in the next episode for coming last in the Endurance mission. If they won the next Temple Mission (the "Fireball" challenge), they could have sent another team in their place. However, they did not win it, so the Purple Team went to the Temple.
- ^{3}In “Spin Fly,” each team won a certain amount of Pyramid Pieces in the challenge, which is indicated in parentheses.

==== Challenges ====
1. Blocked
2. Raft Pull
3. Drop Out
4. Super Stumped
5. Waterworks
6. Fireball (a challenge from a previous season voted by "Endurance" fans to appear again)
7. Hang 5
8. Cubed
9. Create Your Own Game
10. Circle of Trust
11. Spin Fly
12. Final Temple

=== Season 5 - Endurance: High Sierras (2006–07) ===
The fifth season was taped at Shaver Lake in the High Sierra Mountains of central California. Contestants lived in multi-level tree houses without electricity. The Green Team of Alex Carignan and Cealey Godwin, won the grand prize, a trip to Hawaii.

In a new twist to the fifth season's contestant selection, the Discovery Kids website held a casting poll in which fans could vote for one boy and one girl out of six hopefuls. Garret Manno and Kelsey Schultz won this poll by a narrow margin and were the 99th and 100th contestants out of the history of the program.

In the third episode ("Unwind"), one team – Garret Manno and Anna Asare – was eliminated without going to Temple. They finished last in the first challenge and left the game without a team color; the other seven teams selected colors as they finished. The "colorless team" received the "Immunity Triangle", which they gave to the Purple team of Kelsey and Dakota. The team that received the Triangle of Immunity may use it once to avoid going to the Temple of Fate; they never did.

The Blue team of Connor Finnegan and Taylor Sico-McNulty set a record this season by surviving three trips to the Temple. Dakota Fisher, of the Purple team, was featured in a commercial for Burlington Coat Factory. Kelsey Schultz, also of the Purple team, appeared in the film Queen Sized. Max McFarland of the Orange team was featured on in-store advertisements nationwide in Hallmark Gold Crown stores. Aeriél Miranda of the Red team, competed in a family edition of Fear Factor, and had a recurring role as Shana on television drama Pretty Little Liars.

==== Contestants and teams ====
The eight teams competing were:

Position	Team	Boy		Age	Girl		Age	Starting Piece	Temple Winner	Piece(s) Awarded to	Pieces Held
Position	Team	Name	Hometown	Age	Name	Hometown	Age	Starting Piece	Temple Winner	Piece(s) Awarded to	Pieces Held
8th	N/A	Garret Manno	Orlando, FL	13	Anna Nti Asare	Laramie, WY	14	Friendship	No temple visit	Purple	1
7th	Gray	Isaac (Ike) Moody	Riverside, CA	15	Darci Miller	Baldwin, NY	15	Luck	Yellow	Yellow	1
6th	Yellow	Aric Manthey	Madison, SD	15	Lilly Brown	Bloomington, IN	15	Trust	Blue	Blue	2
5th	Orange	Max McFarland	Kansas City, MO	14	Kristine Turner	Huntington Beach, CA	14	Strength	Blue	Red	1
4th	Red	Cameron Uranick	Orlando, FL	14	Aeriél Miranda	Dallas, TX	14	Knowledge	Blue	Green	2
3rd	Blue	Connor Finnegan	Acton, MA	15	Taylor Sico-McNulty	Boxford, MA	14	Perseverance	Green		7
2nd	Purple	Dakota Fisher	Eliot, ME	15	Kelsey Schultz	Rockwall, TX	15	Teamwork	Green (Finale)		6
Winner	Green	Alex Carignan	Leominster, MA	14	Cealey Godwin	Tallahassee, FL	14	Commitment			13

Right-to-Stay Eliminations

Boy			Girl		
Name	Hometown	Age	Name	Hometown	Age
Adrian Bardales	LaPlace, LA	15	Martina Iwala	Lagos, Nigeria	14
Rafael Liriano	Bronx, NY	15	Stefanie Fernandez	Boca Raton, FL	15

* Initially, the Blue team was Ike and Taylor and the Gray team was Connor and Darci. The Blue team gave the Samadhi to the Red team thinking they were going to switch Alex and Cameron but they used it to switch Connor and Ike.

** Anna and Garret were eliminated after an Endurance mission and never went to the Temple of Fate.

==== Elimination table ====
Contestants	Challenges												
Contestants	1^{1}	2		3	4	5^{3}	6	7	8^{4}	9	10	11^{5}	12
Alex & Cealey	WIN	SAFE	SAFE	SAFE	SAFE	SAFE	SAFE	WIN	SAFE	SAFE	TEMPLE	WIN (5)	FIRST
Dakota & Kelsey	SAFE	SAFE	SAFE	SAFE	SAFE	WIN	WIN	SAFE	SAMADHI	WIN	WIN	WIN (3)	SECOND
Connor & Taylor	SAFE	WIN^{2}	SAMADHI	WIN	SAFE	SAFE	TEMPLE	TEMPLE	WIN	TEMPLE	OUT		
Cameron & Aeriél	SAFE	SAFE	CTRL	SAFE	WIN	SAFE	WIN	SAFE	TEMPLE	OUT			
Max & Kristine	SAFE	SAFE	SAFE	SAFE	SAFE	SAFE	WIN	OUT					
Aric & Lily	SAFE	SAFE	SAFE	SAFE	TEMPLE	SAFE	OUT						
Issac (Ike) & Darci	SAFE	SAFE	SAMADHI	SAMADHI	OUT								
Garret & Anna	OUT												

Key
(FIRST) The team won the Final Temple Mission and became “Endurance” Champions.
(SECOND) The team lost the Final Temple Mission and were the runners-up.
(WIN) The team won the Endurance Mission, the previously eliminated team's pyramid pieces, and the Samadhi.
(WIN) The team won the Temple Mission.
(SAMADHI) The team was handicapped with the Samadhi by the winning team.
(SAFE) The team did not win the challenge, but was safe from going to Temple or did not receive the Samadhi.
(TEMPLE) The team won at the Temple of Fate and avoided elimination.
(TEMPLE) The team came in last place during the Endurance mission and was forced to go to Temple in the next episode.
(OUT) The team lost at the Temple of Fate and was eliminated.
(OUT) The team was eliminated without a team color.

- ^{1} In “Unwind” Garret & Anna finished last in the challenge meaning they were eliminated without receiving a team color.
- ^{2} In “Hot Potato” the Blue Team of Ike and Taylor won the Samadhi that would allow the team who possessed it to switch two players on any two teams. After receiving the Samadhi, the Red Team used it to put Ike on the Gray team with Darci and Connor on the blue team with Taylor.
- ^{3} In “Fill & Spill” there was no Samadhi to give to another team. The winning team (Purple) got the chance to create two super-teams. The Purple team created their super-team of Purple, Red, and Orange. The second super-team was Green, Blue, and Yellow. The winning super-team members were all safe from going to the Temple of Fate.
- ^{4} In “Create Your Own Game” the Red Team was forced to go to Temple of Fate in the next episode for coming last in the Endurance mission. If they won the next Temple Mission (the "Fill ‘Er Up" challenge), they could have sent another team in their place. However, they did not win it, so the Red Team went to Temple.
- ^{5} In “Slingshot Alley” the Green and Purple teams competed for the final eight pyramid pieces of the game. The Green team won five while the Purple team won three of the pieces.

==== Challenges ====
1. Unwind
2. Hot Potato
3. Move It Along
4. Walk The Plank
5. Fill & Spill
6. Superboats
7. It's A Drag
8. C.Y.O.G.
9. Fill ‘Er Up
10. All Tied Up
11. Slingshot Alley
12. Final Temple

=== Season 6 – Endurance: Fiji (2007–08) ===
Repeating the candidate selection innovation first introduced for Season 5's Endurance: High Sierras, a casting poll was again held at the Discovery Kids website, allowing fans to select two contestants from a group of six hopefuls. The contest ran from June until July 9. Will Cuddy and Leslie Powell won the casting poll (and later became the Green Team). Two contestants are siblings of previous Endurance contestants. Connor Konz's sister Abbey and Leslie Powell's brother Glen both competed in Season 2 (and were subsequently eliminated in the Right-to Stay challenge).

Episodes began airing on October 13, 2007, on the Discovery Kids channel with the finale broadcast March 8, 2008. A new feature, the "Magic Box", was introduced in this season's third episode (Mana Kisi), giving a secret advantage to the team that wins it.

The Blue team of Ben Scheuer and Jordyn Barbato won the grand prize which was a trip to Australia. This was also the second time the blue team has become the endurance champion with Jonna Mannion and Aaron Throrburg being the first in season 1.

Also, with this being the last season, that leaves the Purple, Orange and Yellow teams without winning an Endurance.

Future Appearances:

Briana Vega (who was on the Yellow Team) was a contestant on High School Musical: Get in the Picture.

Jonathan Young competed on Survivor 42 which he finished in 4th place and Survivor 50: In the Hands of the Fans which he finished in 2nd place, both were filmed in Fiji.

There was no Gray or Brown team this season, which meant only six teams competed:

Position	Team	Boy		Age	Girl		Age	Starting Piece	Temple Winner	Piece(s) Awarded to	Pieces Held
Position	Team	Name	Hometown	Age	Name	Hometown	Age	Starting Piece	Temple Winner	Piece(s) Awarded to	Pieces Held
6th	Yellow	Kyle Curtis	Pearland, TX	15	Briana Vega	Winter Springs, FL	15	Perseverance	Purple	Red	1
5th	Purple	Connor Konz	Humble, TX	15	Jackie Wei	Highlands Ranch, CO	15	Leadership	Blue	Blue	1
4th	Orange	Caleb Courtney	Blowing Rock, NC	14	Lauren Dixon	Maitland, FL	15	Courage	Green	Green	2
3rd	Red	Jonathan Young	Orange Beach, AL	14	Hannah Gross	West Bloomfield, MI	14	Heart	Blue		3
2nd	Green	Will Cuddy	Beaverton, OR	15	Leslie Powell	Austin, TX	15	Friendship	Blue (Finale)		6
Winner	Blue	Ben Scheuer	Cloquet, MN	15	Jordyn Barbato	Gibsonton, FL	14	Strength			14

Right-to-Stay Eliminations

Boy			Girl		
Name	Hometown	Age	Name	Hometown	Age
Andres Ramirez	Austin, TX	15	Rebecca Simonoko	Ludlow, MA	15
Matthew Jones	Raleigh, NC	14	Cinnamon Aldridge	Omaha, NE	13

==== Elimination table ====
Contestants	Challenges										
Contestants	1	2	3	4	5	6	7^{3}	8		9^{5}	10
Ben & Jordyn	SAFE	SAFE	SAFE	SAFE	TEMPLE	SAFE	WIN	TEMPLE		WIN (2)	FIRST
Will & Leslie	WIN^{1}	SAFE	SAFE	WIN	SAFE	WIN	TEMPLE	SAFE	SAFE	WIN (3)	SECOND
Jonathan & Hannah	SAFE	SAFE	WIN	SAFE	SAFE	SAMADHI	WIN	WIN^{4}	OUT		
Caleb & Lauren	SAFE	WIN^{2}	SAFE	SAFE	WIN	SAFE	OUT				
Connor & Jackie	SAFE	SAFE	TEMPLE	SAMADHI	OUT						
Kyle & Briana	SAFE	TEMPLE	OUT								

Key
(FIRST) The team won the Final Temple Mission and became “Endurance” Champions.
(SECOND) The team lost the Final Temple Mission and were the runners-up.
(WIN) The team won the Endurance Mission, the previously eliminated team's pyramid pieces, and the Samadhi.
(WIN) The team won the Temple Mission.
(SAMADHI) The team was handicapped with the Samadhi by the winning team.
(SAFE) The team did not win the challenge, but was safe from going to Temple or did not receive the Samadhi.
(TEMPLE) The team won at the Temple of Fate and avoided elimination.
(TEMPLE) The team was selected to go to Temple by the Endurance mission winners.
(OUT) The team lost at the Temple of Fate and was eliminated.

- ^{1} By winning the first challenge, the Green team won the Magic Box.
- ^{2} The Orange team decided to remove the Samadhi from the game so that they could instead automatically send the Yellow team to the Temple of Fate.
- ^{3} In “Shark Bait” the Blue and Red Teams won the challenge, and each had the right to send one team to the Temple, even the other winning team.
- ^{4} In “Stand Bags” the Red Team won the challenge but was not guaranteed immunity.
- ^{5} In the "Scavenger Hunt" challenge, the Blue and Green teams competed for the final five pyramid pieces of the game. The Blue team won two while the Green team won three of the pieces.

==== Challenges ====
1. Sand Bar Relay
2. Blind Faith
3. Box Launch
4. Fish Food
5. Weight An Hour
6. Island Hopping
7. 3 To Go/Shark Bait
8. Stand Bags
9. Scavenger Hunt
10. Final Temple
