= Unanimous (British TV series) =

2006 British game show television series

- Presented by: Alex Humes
- Country of origin: United Kingdom
- No. of episodes: 8

Production
- Running time: 45 minutes

Original release
- Network: Channel 4 (2006)
- Release: 27 October – 15 December 2006

Unanimous is a United Kingdom-based game show broadcast on Channel 4 from 27 October 2006 to 15 December 2006. It was based on an American game show titled Unan1mous.

Unanimous: The Fallout, was shown on E4 later at night after Unanimous. It was hosted by comedians Paddy McGuinness and Olivia Lee and featured regular guest Karl Daly, played by Tom Bennett.

The 'Host' of the show was Alex Humes. Although fairly unknown, Humes starred in the reality TV programme Space Cadets, also for Channel 4, where he played one of the Russian pilots. The voice-over for the programme was provided by Phil Gallagher.

The show was not live but was recorded many weeks before airing. Contestants were not informed of the rules or objectives of the game before it started – only that they were going to be playing in a game show with a substantial prize fund, and they would be filmed non-stop in an enclosed environment.

== Concept ==
Nine strangers are locked together in a bunker and told they cannot leave until they unanimously choose to award one of them the grand prize money. Contestants are isolated from the outside world, and have no access to any time references. If a contestant leaves the bunker, the amount of the available prize is cut in half.

Votes are cast by each contestant taking a ball and selecting the name of one of the other contestants via a roller inside of it (a person's own name is not included in their ball). If a vote is not unanimous, something negative happens to the players in order to increase the pressure to reach a unanimous decision. Throughout the course of the game, these were the "punishments" the players received:

- The contestants select three random envelopes, each containing a secret about one of them. It is not known whose secrets are being read, and contestants vote to decide which secret is the worst. The holder of that secret is "outcast" from the game, meaning they are no longer eligible to win the money, but that they will remain in the bunker (wearing a special uniform) and continue to vote. Outcast players are also still subject to the rule that if anyone leaves, the amount will be halved. (After Vote 1)
- All contestants (including Outcasts) must in turn vote. The contestant who gets the fewest votes is subsequently made an "outcast" (after Votes 2 & 3)
- The contestants are told that every second they can not reach a unanimous decision will cost them £1 (which totals £86,400 a day) - the money will not stop shrinking until either they all agree who wins it, or the money goes down to nothing. Meaning either they agree who gets it, or no one does. Before every vote the clock is stopped. If they do not agree the clock is restarted after the end of the vote.

== The Bunker ==
- All voting takes place in the raised "Inner Circle". On the wall in front of it is a large screen where the unnamed host of the show (actually Alex Humes) appears when it is time to vote. Contestants sit around the table to vote, and when told to do so drop the voting spheres down holes in the table. The spheres come out subsequently in front of the host.
- The isolation booth is a room on a raised level which is higher than any other room in the bunker. Contestants may sometimes be asked to here to vote to make a contestant an "outcast". Contestants have also been asked to nominate a member to go there for other purposes –
  - In the second episode, the group was asked to nominate one contestant to enter the booth, whilst the rest of the group openly discussed this contestant. The contestant who was nominated was Kamran. While he was in the isolation booth he was given the opportunity to phone home or to listen in on their conversation. He listened in on their conversation.
  - In the third episode, the host instructed all outcasts to go to the isolation booth claiming that they were going to hear a piece of information about one of the contestants. The Outcasts were Anna and Kamran. When in the isolation room they found that there was not actually any information and subsequently were given the choice by the host that they either told the contestants nothing or told them what had happened.

== Cast and vote table ==
Contestant	Age	Occupation	Episode 1 (Note: Anonymised secrets (revealed to the audience to be about Kelly, Kamran and Anna) were selected randomly and read out loud. The secret chosen as worst was revealed to be Anna's, so she was made an outcast. This was that she had slept with their best friend's partner behind their back. Anna then claimed that she had lied during her interview, and that this was false.)		Episode 2 (Note: Kamran was voted as outcast.)		Episode 3 (Note: On being voted outcast, Andy was given access to a safe. The contents of this were not revealed to the viewers.)		Episode 4 (Note: The contents of the safe were revealed to be a slip of paper telling Andy to nominate another participate to become an outcast. He selected Pip. There was no vote. At the end of the episode, the group were ordered to select a participate to take a lie detector test. This person was not revealed to the viewers.)	Episode 5 (Note: Alex was selected to take the lie detector test. He told the truth on all but one question. Asked if he would stick with the group's decision if it decided to vote in a certain way, he answered yes, however this was revealed to be a lie. Ultimately, the outcasts voted for him to join their group, much to the discontent of Pip. However, there was a twist to this episode - one of the outcasts got voted back into the game, as chosen by the contestants left in the game. The outcast elected back into the game turned out to be Kamran.)		Episode 6 (Note: Sian was chosen as a "leader", and led the group in discussions etc. before the vote. As leader she had to choose a participant to vote as outcast. She chose to make Lusipher an outcast, however he was given the option of staying in the game but this would cause the prize money to be cut in half.)		Episode 7 (Note: Lusipher accepted the offer to remain active, causing the money to be cut in half. He also revealed the information that no more outcasts will be made active again, and Anna chose to leave, cutting the money in half again. Beverley, Kamran and Lusipher decided that they were unlikely to win, so the group focussed on trying to decide between Kelly and Sian. There was no vote during this episode. During this episode, the prize fund dropped from £746,275 down to £133,447 (A decrease of £612,828).)	Episode 8 (Note: The final 5 seem to have become a final 2, Sian vs. Kelly. Kamran is considered after a family message is shown, mentioning that Kamran is flat broke, but this is quickly dismissed. At the end of the episode, a vote is cast at £106,562, and a Unanimous decision is made, for Sian, the young mother, to win the remaining money.)	Final status
Contestant	Age	Occupation	Vote	Other	Vote	Outcast	Vote	Outcast	Outcast	Vote	Other	Vote	Outcast	Other	Vote	Final status
Sian	21	Law student	0		0		2	Lusipher		2		6	Lusipher		7	Winner (£106,562)
Beverley	33	Art dealer	0		2		0	Lusipher		2		1			0	Active
Kamran	38	Property developer	1	Secret	2		X	Pip		X	Voted in	1			0	Active
Kelly	25	Lap dancer	1	Secret	2		1	Andy		2		0			1	Runner up (Note: Kelly became runner up after receiving one vote in the final episode.)
Lusipher	31	Unemployed	0		1		1	Andy		1		1		Halved prize	0	Active
Alex	22	Law student	2		0		1	Andy		2	Voted out	X			X	Outcast
Pip	37	Nurse	3		1		1	Andy		X		X			X	Outcast
Andy	22	Athlete	0		1		3	Pip	Pip	X		X			X	Outcast
Anna	44	Business woman	2	Worst secret	X		X	Andy		X		X		Walked		

== Reception ==
Unanimous did not attract high ratings and could therefore be considered commercially unsuccessful. The opening episode attracted just 990,000 viewers, falling to under 450,000 by episode four and less than 350,000 by episode seven. The final episode attracted just over 370,000 viewers. Such a sharp fall in ratings could be largely due to the time-slot change from 9pm to 8pm from episode four onwards, thus forcing the show to compete for viewers with EastEnders on BBC One.
