= Julie Dubela =

American singer

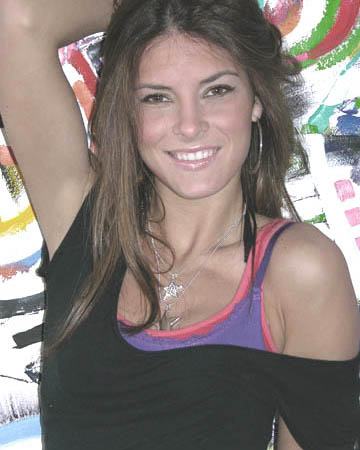
- Dubela in 2008

Background information
- Born: January 16, 1991 (age 35)
- Origin: Stratham, New Hampshire, U.S.
- Genre: Pop
- Occupation: Singer
- Years active: 2003–present

Julie Dubela (born January 16, 1991) is an American singer from Stratham, New Hampshire. She appeared on several television programs, including American Juniors and American Idol, and is known in the Boston, Massachusetts area for her live performances of "The Star-Spangled Banner".

== Career ==
=== Live performances ===
She has performed for the New Hampshire General Court, the state legislature of New Hampshire. She sang the national anthem in Fenway Park (home of the Boston Red Sox), TD Banknorth Garden (home of the Boston Bruins, formerly "FleetCenter"), Gillette Stadium (home of the New England Patriots), and elsewhere. Performances outside of sports have included the Seacoast Repertory Theater and an event planned to happen at Six Flags New England.

=== Television and film ===
Dubela first appeared on national television in 2003, when she participated in Fox TV's American Juniors, a reality TV competition, to select members for a new band. She became a semi-finalist. Her last performance of "Rainy Days and Mondays" was criticized by the celebrity judges (Deborah Gibson, Gladys Knight, and Justin Guarini), for her showing precociousness and nervousness in the performance, and she didn't make it the next stage. Subsequently, she appeared on PAX TV's America's Most Talented Kid, a TV talent competition, where she narrowly lost on an episode in 2005. Later in 2005, she was part of Discovery Kids's Endurance: Tehachapi, a national TV show similar to Survivor. She was paired on the Gray team with John Kardian, but was subsequently eliminated as the first team to go home. Taped during the summer, it started airing later in the year, continuing into early 2006 on the NBC broadcast network, in addition to the digital Discovery Kids Channel.

In September 2005, she appeared in the film Wait Till This Year, which was aired by the New England Sports Network (NESN) and subsequently released on DVD.

In January 2008, Dubela appeared as one of the hopefuls on the Miami audition episode of American Idol. However, all three judges voted to deny Dubela advancement to the Hollywood stage of the competition.

=== Charity ===
Dubela has done charitable work through the StarMight Foundation of Strafford, which involved contributing to a CD, Tru Colors, for the St. Jude's Children's Hospital in Memphis, Tennessee. The CD was also distributed to children in New England area hospitals. Singers from the group, including Dubela, perform in person for the patients, who receive the CD, which is also sold separately to raise funds for the organization.
