= Christopher Tavarez =

American actor, model, and athlete (born 1992)

Chris Tavarez
- Born: November 7, 1992 (age 33); Atlanta, Georgia, U.S.
- Occupations: Actor, model and athlete

Christopher (Chris) Tavarez (born November 7, 1992, Atlanta, Georgia) is an American actor, model, and athlete. After modeling as a young child, his parents were encouraged by scouts to pursue the world of acting for their son. His first television appearance was on the Discovery Kids reality show, Endurance. He has been cast in several movies, including Big Momma's House 2, and he has a recurring role on Tyler Perry's television series, Meet the Browns. Chris's big break came when he was cast in the Disney Channel original movie, Avalon High.

Chris was the safety and captain of his football team at Westlake High School in Atlanta, Georgia. He has been scouted and has more than seven NCAA Division I scholarships to colleges such as Duke, Tulane, Maryland, and Vanderbilt. In August 2010, Tavarez committed to play football for Duke University.

In 2020, Tavarez was sentenced to 300 days in county jail following domestic violence charges.
