= J. D. Roth =

American actor, producer, and presenter (born 1968)

- Born: James David Weinroth; April 20, 1968 (age 58); Cherry Hill, New Jersey, U.S.
- Occupations: Actor; television producer; television presenter
- Years active: 1983–present
- Spouse: Christine
- Children: 2, including Cooper

James David Weinroth (born April 20, 1968), known professionally as J. D. Roth, is an American actor, television producer and television presenter.

Roth's hosting jobs include ABC's fall 2008 series Opportunity Knocks, the Fox adult reality game series Unan1mous, the children's reality series Endurance on NBC and the Discovery Kids Channel, and the children's game series Fun House, which aired on Fox and in syndication. He is also one of the narrators for the NBC reality series The Biggest Loser.

Roth was the CEO of 3Ball Productions, a television production company based in Manhattan Beach, California. 3Ball Productions was sold to Dutch group Eyeworks in 2006 and was renamed to Eyeworks USA.

== Personal life ==
Roth and his wife, Christine, are parents of two children, Cooper and Duncan.

== Early life ==
Roth was born and raised in Cherry Hill, New Jersey. He first acquired an interest in acting when he was ten, and has been working on commercials and being in front of and behind the camera ever since. In a 1996 interview, he said that he worked 22 commercials in his first year of acting. At age 11, he booked himself an audition for a children's show at a New York nightclub, winning a spot along with others including future stars Sarah Jessica Parker, Rick Schroder, and Ricki Lake. He was one of the hosts of the kids' news magazine version of Wonderama, which aired from 1980 to 1987.

After being a finalist on Star Search, he made numerous guest appearances on Charles in Charge, As the World Turns, The Equalizer, and Tales from the Darkside as Seymour Strand in the episode Seymourlama in 1986 (series 4, episode 8). After graduating from Cherry Hill High School East in 1986, and before producing reality television, Roth's first television exposure was hosting the kids' game show Fun House, which was one of the most popular children's shows in the U.S. at the time. At age 20, he became the youngest person to host a game show. During its three-year run, he also traveled across the country hosting a live version for children. In 1987, he auditioned for the part of Wesley Crusher in Star Trek: The Next Generation, but lost to Wil Wheaton. He was a panelist in the Davidson version of Hollywood Squares.

== Television productions ==
In 1991, after his Fun House stint, he went on to host the magazine video game series GamePro TV. The following year, he started his own production company, Slam Dunk Productions. He initially produced and hosted the short-lived children's game show Double Up on NBC. He emceed several other game shows, including the first season of Masters of the Maze for The Family Channel, and two of the six seasons of Zooventure, a children's game show taped at the San Diego Zoo and aired on Animal Planet. Zooventure aired in seven countries. Roth also produced a game show version of the word game Mad Libs for the Disney Channel with veteran television personality Dick Clark, who worked with Roth behind-the-scenes. He remarked that children would sometimes write in asking what grade he was in because of his youthful voice. In 1996, he took on the titular role of The Real Adventures of Jonny Quest, having been a childhood fan of the classic series. He found the show educational, a quality he admired whose absence he criticized in other shows billed as such. While hosting Zooventure, he hosted his first adult game show, Sex Wars, in syndication.

=== Moolah Beach ===
In 2001, he formed 3Ball Productions, along with Todd A. Nelson. Roth produced and hosted his first children's reality show, Moolah Beach, as a 30-minute weekly show for Fox as part of its Fox Kids lineup. It was later shown on ABC Family as an extended 60-minute show in the summer/fall of 2001 for 13 episodes. After ABC chose not to continue the series, Roth took the show concept to NBC and Discovery Kids as Endurance.

=== Endurance ===
A spinoff titled Endurance began on NBC and Discovery Kids in 2002. Renewed in 2007 for a sixth season, Endurance has been much more successful. Roth, who serves as creator, host, and executive producer of this show, which was nominated in 2006 for two Daytime Emmy Awards for Outstanding Performer in a Children's Series. In 2007, Endurance was nominated for a Daytime Emmy as Outstanding Children's Series. The show ran for six seasons.

=== Other productions ===
From 1995 to 1997, Roth co-hosted The Disney Channel's Walt Disney World Inside Out along with Brianne Leary and George Foreman.

While not working on Endurance, Roth serves as narrator on NBC's weight loss reality show, The Biggest Loser (with Caroline Rhea and, later, Alison Sweeney), which he also co-created and produces. He also produces reality shows Breaking Bonaduce, with Danny Bonaduce on VH1 and Beauty and the Geek on the CW Network, alongside Ashton Kutcher.

On September 23, 2008, ABC premiered Opportunity Knocks, which received low ratings, especially in the 18-34 demographic, and was canceled after three episodes. ABC subsequently scheduled the remaining six completed episodes for broadcast, beginning on May 26, 2009.

Roth's 3Ball Productions has partnered with Milestone Entertainment to produce the California Lottery's new game show, Make Me a Millionaire, which premiered on January 17, 2009, for an initial four-year run, but was canceled due to poor ratings; the last program was on July 3, 2010.

He hosted and co-created Unan1mous, which premiered March 22, 2006. Though the show did well in the ratings, possible high production costs kept it from getting a second season. In September 2006, the Dutch company Eyeworks Group announced that it had acquired a 50-percent ownership of 3Ball Productions. He also produced the ABC game show Downfall, which aired in the summer of 2010. Hosted by wrestler Chris Jericho, the show featured contestants answering trivia questions to stop valuable prizes from falling from the roof of a Los Angeles building.

Beginning in 2011, Roth served as producer for the Spike reality show Bar Rescue. As of August 2024, the show has aired nine seasons.

Preceded by N/A	Host of Masters of the Maze; 1994–1995	Succeeded by Mario López
