= Unan1mous =

- Logo
- Created by: Lincoln Hiatt; J. D. Roth; Todd A. Nelson
- Presented by: J. D. Roth
- Narrated by: Jeselle Hicks
- Country of origin: United States
- Original language: English
- No. of seasons: 1
- No. of episodes: 8

Production
- Executive producer: Lincoln Hiatt
- Camera setup: Multi-camera
- Running time: 22 minutes
- Production companies: Hiattmedia; 3Ball Productions

Original release
- Network: Fox
- Release: March 22 – May 10, 2006

Unan1mous is an American reality television program that premiered on the Fox Network on March 22, 2006, and ran for one season. The host of the series was J. D. Roth.

== Concept ==
Nine strangers are locked in a bunker and told they cannot leave until they unanimously choose to award one of them the grand prize money. Contestants are isolated from the outside world, and have no access to any time references. If a contestant chooses to leave the bunker and quit the game would result in the grand prize being cut in half (in one instance on the show, a contestant was forced to leave for health reasons so the money was not cut in half).

Votes are cast by each contestant taking a ball and selecting the name of one of the other contestants via a roller inside of it (a person's own name is not included in their ball). If a vote is not unanimous, something negative happens to the players to increase the pressure to reach a unanimous decision. Throughout the course of the game, these were the "punishments" the players received:

- The contestants select three random envelopes, each containing a secret about one of them. It is not known whose secrets are being read, and contestants vote to decide which secret is the worst. The holder of that secret is "outcast" from the game, meaning they are no longer eligible to win the money, but that they will remain in the bunker (wearing a special uniform) and continue to vote. Outcast players are also still subject to the rule that if anyone leaves, the amount will be halved. (After Vote 1)
- The money begins to constantly decrease, pausing only when a vote is being held or to freeze the amount when someone has decided to leave. (After Vote 2)
- The contestants secretly vote to decide who will become an outcast. (After Votes 3 and 4)
  - The person voted to become an outcast is given the chance to select any remaining active player to become an outcast. (After Outcast Vote 2)
- The three outcasts each get to select one of the four remaining players, making the unpicked person an outcast. (After Vote 5)
- The four outcasts must select which one of the outcasts gets put back into the game. If they cannot decide by a majority within 15 minutes, the decision is left to the group leader (who, if an outcast, can choose to bring him/herself back). (After Vote 6)

The show was supposedly open-ended, and could end at any time: from one episode to several depending on if or when a unanimous vote is eventually reached. If the contest continued long enough, the money would be completely gone. The final episode aired May 10, 2006. However, the whole premise had a definite time limit of less than eight full days. The entire show was filmed in only 10 days, as the total amount of money was cut in half once and then decreased at such a rate as to make it impossible for the contestants to be stuck in the bunker "forever."

== Cast ==
Contestant	Age	Occupation	Status
Adam	35	Poker Player	Outcast
Jameson	38	Human Resources Manager	Active
Jamie	24	Choreographer	Left
Jonathan	30	Real Estate Financier	Active
Kelly	49	Minister	Left
Richard	42	Writer/Temp Worker	Active
Steve	43	Truck Driver	Outcast
Tarah	25	Handbag Designer	Winner
Vanessa	36	Teacher	Outcast

- Richard, 42: Temp Worker, writer
- Jameson, 38: Human Resources Manager. Gay Activist
- Kelly, 49: Minister, Conservative Republican
- Jonathan, 30: Real Estate Finance,
- Jamie, 24: Choreographer, Bow and Rifle Hunter
- Steve, 43: Truck Driver. Conservative Christian. Married and has four children
- Tarah, 25: Handbag Designer, Republican
- Vanessa, 36: Teacher, Soccer Mom. Atheist and liberal
- Adam, 35: Professional Poker Player, bartender, liberal, actor

== Vote history ==
(Red indicates Outcast)

Contestant	Votes															
Contestant	Vote 1		Vote 2		Vote 3		Outcast vote 1	Vote 4		Outcast vote 2	Vote 5		Vote 6		Vote 7	
Contestant	Got	Gave	Got	Gave	Got	Gave		Got	Gave		Got	Gave	Got	Gave	Got	Gave
Jameson	0	Steve	0	Steve	1	Tarah	Adam	1	Tarah		2	Tarah	3	Jonathan	1	Tarah
Jonathan	1	Unknown	0	Adam	1	Unknown		1	Unknown	Vanessa	3	Richard	3	Richard	0	Tarah
Richard	0	Unknown	0	Steve	0	Unknown		2	Steve		1	Jonathan	1	Jonathan	0	Tarah
Tarah	2	Unknown	0	Steve	2	Jameson	Adam	1	Unknown	Steve	1	Jameson	0	Jameson	6	Jameson
Vanessa	1	Unknown	1	Steve	2	Tarah	Adam	1	Unknown	Jonathan	0	Jameson	0	Jameson	0	Tarah
Steve	3	Vanessa	7	Vanessa	1	Adam	Adam	1	Unknown		0	Jonathan	0	Jameson	0	Tarah
Adam	0	Unknown	1	Steve	1	Unknown		0	Unknown	Vanessa	0	Jonathan	0	Jonathan	0	Tarah
Jamie	2	Unknown	0	Steve	0	Unknown										
Kelly	0	Jonathan	0	Steve												

== Finale ==
On Wednesday, May 10, 2006, the final vote was taken. Tarah received the necessary 6 votes (out of 7; her vote was for Jameson) to win the game, and won $382,193 as a result.

== Broadcast information ==
Unan1mous was broadcast on eight consecutive Wednesday nights, from March 22 to May 10. It was broadcast in the 9:30 pm time slot, immediately after American Idol (the actual start time for each episode was 9:32 pm). The premiere episode attracted an audience of 15.84 million viewers in the United States, with most of the other episodes attracting between 12 and 14.5 million viewers. Despite these high ratings, the show did not return for a second season, presumably due to high production costs. The show aired in Australia on Fox8. It was also broadcast in Sweden on TV6 and in the Netherlands on RTL 5.

== International versions ==
Versions of the show have aired in Italy, Kenya, Spain, Norway and in the United Kingdom (where the show is called Unanimous). A version in Russia called Who does NOT want to be a millionaire? aired starting on October 4, 2008 on the Russian TNT channel. An Indian adaptation of the show, known as The Player, aired on December 12, 2009 on Channel V (now Fox Music Asia).

Country	Title	Broadcaster	Presenter	Premiere	Finale
United Kingdom	Unanimous	Channel 4	Alex Humes	October 27, 2006	December 15, 2006
Italy	Unan1mous	Canale 5	Maria De Filippi	September 1, 2006	September 13, 2006
Russia	Кто НЕ хочет стать миллионером? Kto ne chočet stat millionerom?	TNT	Ksenia Sobchak	October 3, 2008	October 28, 2008
Spain	Unan1mous	Antena 3	Ximo Rovira	January 28, 2007	2007
India	The Player	Channel V	Ashish Sablawat	December 12, 2009	2010
Norway	Unan1mous	TV2	?	?	?
Kenya	Unan1mous	?	?	?	?
