= List of The Looney Tunes Show episodes =

This is a list of episodes from the animated series The Looney Tunes Show, which premiered on May 3, 2011. The second and final season began October 2, 2012, and ended on August 27, 2013. A year after the series' original run ended, a previously unreleased episode aired on August 31, 2014, on Cartoon Network.

== Series overview ==
Season	Episodes	Originally released	
Season	Episodes	First released	Last released
1	26	May 3, 2011	February 7, 2012
2	26	October 2, 2012	November 8, 2013

== Episodes ==
=== Season 1 (2011–12) ===
No. overall	No. in season	Title	Directed by	Written by	Original release date	U.S. viewers (millions)
1	1	"Best Friends"	Spike Brandt, Tony Cervone & Chris Headrick	Jim Cashman, Hugh Davidson, Larry Dorf & Rachel Ramras	May 3, 2011	2.46
After seeing a game show, Daffy decides the duo can make quick money by going on the game show Besties, where best friends must answer some questions about one another. However, Daffy's lack of knowledge of anything about Bugs puts a snag in their friendship. To make it up to Bugs, Daffy goes out of his way to purchase tickets himself for a cruise ship using Bugs' credit card and showers his friend with attention, sometimes with unorthodox methods. Finally, Bugs concedes that he likes their friendship the way it is. Guest Stars: Tim Dadabo as Game Show Contestant and Rob Paulsen as Game Show Host Chuck Herost and The Goofy Gophers Merrie Melodies: "Grilled Cheese" by Elmer Fudd
2	2	"Members Only"	Jeff Siergey	Hugh Davidson, Pat Devine, Larry Dorf & Rachel Ramras	May 10, 2011	2.23
Daffy manages to use a member's membership number to the Royal Oaks Glen Oaks Oakwood Oaks Country Club. Bugs meets Lola and the two go out on a date, but while Bugs finds Lola more annoying because of her endless talking, Lola becomes more infatuated with Bugs; Bugs even tells Daffy that he thinks Lola is insane. He attempts to break up with her, but she mistakes his attempt as a marriage proposal. Unable to talk sense into Lola, Bugs decides to use the vows to break up with her; however, Lola breaks up with him to be with the wedding planner, Pepé Le Pew. Guest Star: John O'Hurley as Walter Bunny Merrie Melodies: "I'm a Martian" by Marvin the Martian Wile E. Coyote and Road Runner: "Bubble Trouble" Note: This is the first episode with Wile E. Coyote and Road Runner CGI short.
3	3	"Jailbird and Jailbunny"	Spike Brandt, Tony Cervone & Chris Headrick	Hugh Davidson, Larry Dorf & Rachel Ramras	May 17, 2011	2.08
On an excursion to the Grand Canyon, Daffy is arrested and sent to court for littering on federal property and refuses to pay the fine. He tries to place the blame on Porky and then on Bugs. While on the witness stand, Bugs becomes annoyed by Daffy and the two begin to bicker of spitting drinks at each other, prompting the judge furiously to throw both of them in jail on contempt of court charges. Once inside, Bugs becomes taken to his new environment which is in contrast to Daffy who is in a constant state of fear. In the end, after a brief escape from prison, both serve their one year-long scene. However, when Daffy litters again, the whole situation begins again. Merrie Melodies: "Blow My Stack" by Yosemite Sam
4	4	"Fish and Visitors"	Spike Brandt & Tony Cervone	Hugh Davidson, Larry Dorf, Steve Little & Rachel Ramras	May 24, 2011	2.13
Yosemite Sam comes up with a plan to take his house off the grid by adding solar power panels to reduce his electricity bills. But when a rainstorm disrupts his plan, he starts depending on Bugs and Daffy heavily and eventually becomes too much of a burden for them to handle, prompting them to get rid of him. After an attempt to scare him out results in massive damage, Bugs and Daffy snap and voice all their repressed anger; the storm ends, resulting in Sam going back home. However, the moment Bugs feels forgiving, another storm occurs (likely karma's way of teaching him and Daffy a lesson); Bugs and Daffy slam the door shut to prevent Sam from coming back. Merrie Melodies: "Chickenhawk" by Henery Hawk and Foghorn Leghorn featuring Barnyard Dawg
5	5	"Monster Talent"	Jeff Siergey	Hugh Davidson, Larry Dorf, Ben Falcone & Rachel Ramras	May 31, 2011	2.33
Daffy tries to prepare Gossamer for a school talent show to help him make friends per request of his mother, Witch Lezah. Meanwhile, Bugs becomes an instant celebrity when he stars in Speedy's frozen pizza commercial, which starts to get annoying when people relentlessly keep badgering him to say his quote from the commercial - "I like it." This gets ridiculous as firemen putting out a fire started by Daffy at Bugs' house stop putting out it and imploring Bugs to say his quote. Daffy's plan for Gossamer to imitate what he teaches him to prepare Gossamer for the talent show backfires, including dancing, boxing, and presenting a fish, so Gossamer decides to sing, which actually turns into a success, as he makes new friends at school. Road Runner and Wile E. Coyote: "A Zipline in the Sand" Note: This the first episode without Merrie Melodies.
6	6	"Reunion"	Jeff Siergey	Hugh Davidson, Pat Devine, Larry Dorf & Rachel Ramras	June 7, 2011	2.45
Bugs helps Daffy try to better himself before his class reunion, but they eventually decide that Daffy should just lie about his life so far in order to impress his former classmates. But Daffy fibs soon become excessive, including him bragging how he's an astronaut to an actor to the president of Mexico, which spreads confusion and dubious comments of his so-called success. Bugs becomes preoccupied with acquainting with all the high school graduates, because he never went to high school. Merrie Melodies: "Cock of the Walk" by Foghorn Leghorn Road Runner and Wile E. Coyote: "Fee Fi Fo Dumb"
7	7	"Casa de Calma"	Mauricio Pardo	Mark Banker, Hugh Davidson, Larry Dorf, Doug Langdale & Rachel Ramras	June 14, 2011	2.21
Bugs and Daffy go to a resort where Daffy meets a famous actress. Despite Daffy's attempts to impress her, Daffy's mischief ends up causing him misery and abuse at the hands of her abrasive bodyguard. Bugs on the other hand earns the actress's affections with his cool calm and collected attitude. Guest Stars: Tim Dadabo as Mouse Mariachi Band 1 and Carlos Alazraqui as Mouse Mariachi Band 2 Merrie Melodies: "Queso Bandito" by Speedy Gonzales Road Runner and Wile E. Coyote: "Sail Fail" Note: This episode was made during Laff Riot.
8	8	"Devil Dog"	Keith Baxter, Spike Brandt & Tony Cervone	Jim Cashman, Hugh Davidson, Larry Dorf & Rachel Ramras	June 21, 2011	1.96
Thanks to Pete Puma's bumbling, the vicious Tasmanian Devil escapes from the zoo and Bugs decides to adopt the creature after mistaking him for a dog. This causes constant terror for Daffy and Bugs' other neighbors, until Speedy helps Bugs tame the Tasmanian Devil as the latter decides to enter him into an upcoming dog show. When Daffy mistakenly tries to do the right thing by reporting the Tasmanian Devil to animal control, he ends up helping the two escape from it so Bugs can take him home to Tasmania. Despite this, Taz decides to stay with Bugs. By the end, he has abandoned his murderous instincts in favor of his familiar zany behavior. Road Runner and Wile E. Coyote: "Unsafe at Any Speed"
9	9	"The Foghorn Leghorn Story"	Jeff Siergey	Hugh Davidson, Larry Dorf, Ben Falcone & Rachel Ramras	June 28, 2011	2.04
Daffy ends up portraying Foghorn Leghorn in a film, but fails miserably ending up in a quarrel. Bugs and Yosemite Sam find a vase buried in the backyard, which Sam thinks does something (due to his stupidity) as Bugs says it could be interesting. It does turn up to be worth one million dollars, but Yosemite Sam takes credit for finding, which also ends in a quarrel. Both fights combine, ending with Foghorn and Daffy reconciling and discovering a gold plated turtle in the vase. Unfortunately, the film is a flop, but Foghorn is just happy to have had the opportunity to make one. Note: This episode promptly takes place after a later episode, Working Duck, hinted when Foghorn's assistant Carol points out that Daffy destroyed Foghorn's business company Enormocorp, which happens in that episode. Road Runner and Wile E. Coyote: "Silent But Deadly" Note: The Wile E. Coyote and Road Runner CGI short in this episode "Silent But Deadly" was originally made during Laff Riot.
10	10	"Eligible Bachelors"	Keith Baxter, Spike Brandt & Tony Cervone	Hugh Davidson, Larry Dorf, Ben Falcone & Rachel Ramras	July 5, 2011	2.11
Lola ends a bidding war for Bugs when she puts one hundred thousand dollars on the table, which Bugs is reluctant, as a result of her being annoying to Bugs' last meeting with her, in the ROGOOCC. She flies Bugs to Paris to see the Louvre, Eiffel Tower and Versailles hoping the City of Lights will lead to amour. However, Lola's constant jabbering dampers any chance for love. Daffy is a much cheaper date and Granny bids on him so she can have some help cleaning her attic. Daffy however has a good time with Granny, when she tells him her tales of her time in Paris during World War II where she and Tweety fought against the Nazis. At the end, both Bugs and Daffy place their pictures on the refrigerator, as both pose in front of the Eiffel Tower, which Bugs finds it surprising. Guest Star: Stephanie Courtney as the young Granny Road Runner and Wile E. Coyote: "Winter Blunderland"
11	11	"Peel of Fortune"	Keith Baxter, Spike Brandt & Tony Cervone	Hugh Davidson, Pat Devine, Larry Dorf & Rachel Ramras	July 12, 2011	2.24
While at the mall, Daffy ends up trying to get an ice cream store lady to use the tips to pay for the sundae which doesn't go well. Daffy later learns that Bugs earns his money from an invention he made called the Carrot Peeler. After learning this fact, Daffy decides that a good invention is the perfect get-rich scheme. He gets to work in the garage "inventing" items that have been around for ages. Since inventing is such hard work, Daffy goes for the quick and the dirty, stealing an idea from Bugs' notebook called the Automatic Carrot Peeler. Daffy ends up succeeding causing a reversal of luck on Bugs who ends up moving back to his rabbit hole in the forest. Daffy rakes in plenty of money at first, but when public complaints about the Automatic Carrot Peeler being flammable (since Daffy never fully completed the instructions to the Automatic Carrot Peeler, forgetting to add in the cooling system to prevent this) rise and threaten both their lives with the city planning to repossess their home, Bugs uses a time machine to go back in time and prevent the incident from ever happening by paying for Daffy's sundae and not mentioning about him inventing the Carrot Peeler; however this is a paradox since there is still Bugs' past self around. Some time later, Daffy goes back in time to show some cavemen the toilet paper which he throws to them. It lands on the head of one of the cavemen causing them to attack Daffy. Merrie Melodies: "We Are in Love" by Bugs Bunny and Lola Bunny Road Runner and Wile E. Coyote: "Heavy Metal"
12	12	"Double Date"	Jeff Siergey	Hugh Davidson, Larry Dorf, Ben Falcone & Rachel Ramras	July 19, 2011	1.92
After winning a romantic evening for two (by rigging a contest), Daffy must find the right partner to bring on a dream date at a fancy restaurant. Lola attempts to help him and provides him with a script of what every woman wants to hear, but he reads everything on it aloud in her presence causing Lola herself to become smitten. However, Daffy has already decided that he wants to bring Tina, a gum-smacking duck who works at the Copy Place. They have a great time, but Lola's jealousy pushes her into stalker territory. In the end, Lola starts to get along with Tina, and Bugs complains that Lola is supposed to be his girlfriend. So Lola once again becomes Bugs' girlfriend and Daffy is dating Tina. Porky is shown to be without a date after being previously asked by Daffy (who did it on impulse not knowing he was supposed to get a female date). After Daffy drives by in a limo with Tina, Porky comments that he's got to get a girlfriend. Merrie Melodies: "Be Polite" by Mac and Tosh featuring Marvin the Martian Road Runner and Wile E. Coyote: "Wile E. Sisyphus"
13	13	"To Bowl or Not to Bowl"	Keith Baxter, Spike Brandt & Tony Cervone	Hugh Davidson, Larry Dorf, Ben Falcone & Rachel Ramras	July 26, 2011	2.25
Daffy is attempting to win a bowling tournament with Porky, Marvin the Martian and Pete against his high school rival Terry Delgado. But when Bugs shows up the others favor him over Daffy, which causes Daffy to reveal that being the leader is the only way he has esteem. But after Porky gets injured by Daffy using him as a bowling ball for his technique, Bugs must take his place. Daffy's team are in the lead but when an injury (faked so Daffy can get the final two pins needed to win) leads to Bugs dropping out. Daffy fails to knock over two pins with a gutter-ball, but because of technical problems, he is given another chance. Still, he manages to get another gutter-ball, resulting in their loss. The next day, Porky is shown still recuperating in a wheelchair as Daffy ends up bowling him down the gutter referring to Porky as his "lucky ball." Merrie Melodies: "Yellow Bird" sung by Holland Greco featuring Tweety and Sylvester Road Runner and Wile E. Coyote: "Vicious Cycles"
14	14	"Newspaper Thief"	Spike Brandt & Tony Cervone	Jim Cashman, Hugh Davidson, Larry Dorf & Rachel Ramras	August 23, 2011	2.16
Daffy's morning newspaper seems to be missing, so he concludes there is a thief in the neighborhood—just hours before he and Bugs host a dinner party for their neighbors (in an attempt to prevent them from suing him for Daffy's antics). When Granny, Witch Lezah, Yosemite Sam and Gossamer arrive, Daffy will not let the matter die and attempts to manipulate one of them into confessing to the theft. Later, much to Bugs' frustration, he learns that Daffy's idiocy caused him to overlook renewing his newspaper subscription; he stopped getting the paper because he did not renew his subscription. Merrie Melodies: "Tasmanian Meltdown" featuring Tasmanian Devil Road Runner and Wile E. Coyote: "Gone in 60 Parsecs"
15	15	"Bugs & Daffy Get a Job"	Jeff Siergey	Hugh Davidson, Larry Dorf, Ben Falcone & Rachel Ramras	August 30, 2011	2.28
Daffy has taken to snoring, so a sleep-deprived Bugs nearly pushes him off a building before both agree to visit a medical center. Daffy is offered a surgery for his deviated septum, but he learns he has a small bump on his beak, and when he elects for plastic surgery, his wishes leaving him without a beak. After visiting Porky at his accountant job, Bugs decides to get a job there, but this proves fatal for Porky's work ethic. Bugs' belief that work should be fun leads to Porky being fired but it makes Porky realize that he should not work at a job he disliked. Guest Star: Garry Marshall as Doctor Weisberg Road Runner and Wile E. Coyote: "Heartbreak Bridge"
16	16	"That's My Baby"	Jeff Siergey	Hugh Davidson, Larry Dorf, Ben Falcone & Rachel Ramras	September 6, 2011	2.56
Tina enlists Daffy to babysit her nephew, Zachary. While neglectful at first, a Mommy and Me class changes Daffy's behavior to the point where he is reluctant to give Zachary back to Tina. Meanwhile, Bugs learns why Daffy calls Porky a bummer when Porky falls for every upsell that is offered to him, and what's worse is that Porky doesn't know the difference between an upsale and a good offer. Merrie Melodies: "Skunk Funk" by Pepé Le Pew Road Runner and Wile E. Coyote: "Camo-Coyote"
17	17	"Sunday Night Slice"	Keith Baxter, Spike Brandt & Tony Cervone	Hugh Davidson, Larry Dorf, Ben Falcone & Rachel Ramras	September 13, 2011	2.00
Bugs recaps the time on how Speedy started his Pizzarriba restaurant. It started on the day a pizza restaurant named Girardi's closed down when Mr. Girardi made his fortune and retired. Bugs takes action by buying the restaurant and ends up getting help from Daffy, Porky, Marvin and Pete. When most of them make things difficult for him, Bugs ends up calling in Speedy for help. Upon realizing all he wanted to do was find a place to hang out at on Sunday nights, he rebrands Girardi’s as “Pizzarriba” and gives the restaurant to Speedy because of his success of working there due to his speed and quickness to deliver pizzas to customers in short timing. Merrie Melodies: “The Wizard” by Damon Jones featuring Daffy Duck Road Runner and Wile E. Coyote: "Go Fly a Coyote"
18	18	"DMV"	Jeff Siergey	Hugh Davidson, Larry Dorf, Ben Falcone & Rachel Ramras	September 20, 2011	1.74
After running a stop sign when taking Bugs to the movies, Daffy must take a driving test in order to get a driver's license when his VW parade float is impounded and left to rust. The same thing happens to Lola, who ends up running a red light and not having her driver's licence, and Porky, whose driver's license expired. Even if they passed the written test, their driving instructor is Yosemite Sam. Both Daffy and Lola get their licenses while Porky fails the written portion, but in reality he had perfect test scores, but his scores got accidentally mixed up with Daffy and Lola's respectively. Bugs tries to take Porky home, but crosses the double yellow lines, and worse, left his wallet with his license at home. Despite this, Bugs contentedly decides to walk home. Road Runner and Wile E. Coyote: "Remote Out of Control"
19	19	"Off Duty Cop"	Keith Baxter, Spike Brandt & Tony Cervone	Hugh Davidson, Larry Dorf, Ben Falcone & Rachel Ramras	October 25, 2011	1.66
Daffy goes to see his idol Steve St. James, a character on Off Duty Cop played by Leslie Hunt. After meeting Hunt and realizing his character isn't real, Daffy pretends to be Steve St. James and starts "arresting" innocent people for supposed crimes by handcuffing them with Porky acting as Daffy's chauffeur (which the chauffeur character being named Brandon Steel many times on the series). Meanwhile, Bugs drinks less coffee on Dr. Weisberg's orders, but Yosemite Sam sells him an energy drink called Spargle as an alternative which Bugs gets hooked on. Bugs does a lot of things around the house until he runs out of Spargle. When Bugs forcefully orders Yosemite Sam to take him to the Spargle factory to obtain more, Daffy and Porky pursue Bugs to stop him. Daffy ends up chasing Bugs throughout the factory until Yosemite Sam breaks up the conflict. Just then, the FBI raid the factory and arrest everyone that works there. It turns outs that dangerous chemicals are used in the Spargle drink, which makes it highly addictive. Bugs is taken to the hospital to be treated while Daffy is also arrested for his rampage of handcuffing people. When the lead FBI Agent wants Porky's name to put down as a witness (as Porky is the only one not arrested), Porky states "Brandon Steel" where the FBI Agent just lists him as "chauffeur." Sometime later, Bugs is ordered to have only one cup of coffee (albeit an enormous cup). Guest Stars: Garry Marshall as Dr. Weisberg and Powers Boothe as Leslie Hunt Road Runner and Wile E. Coyote: "Butte E. Fall"
20	20	"Working Duck"	Spike Brandt & Tony Cervone	Hugh Davidson, Larry Dorf & Rachel Ramras	November 1, 2011	2.09
Daffy loses his job as a security guard for the local bank after sleeping on the job during a night-time robbery, so he vows to get a new job. After several weeks pass, and all Daffy produces is a less than impressive resume, Bugs kicks him out of the house for a while. However, when Daffy starts trying to pull his own weight (literally), Bugs signs him up as a muffin man for Enormocorp. Daffy comes across Foghorn's meeting and makes fun of his personality behind the window. What sounds like direct insults to Foghorn actually inspires Foghorn to make Daffy his advisor, and eventual successor as CEO. However, Daffy's reliance of Foghorn's advice on asking the muffin man for help ends up sinking the company when he mistakes Pete Puma for the new muffin man who gives Daffy terrible advice of using the "Proceed as Planned" choice instead of the "Delay the Merger" choice. Elmer Fudd later reports that Enormocorp has gone bankrupt following a bad business deal and many of its workers are now out of a job which may have a serious effect on the economy. He also states that Daffy has yet to comment on this. Daffy is done as a CEO and decides pulling his own weight pulls others down with him. Merrie Melodies: "Pizzarriba" by Speedy Gonzales and Gustavo Road Runner and Wile E. Coyote: "Another Bat Idea"
21	21	"French Fries"	Jeff Siergey	Hugh Davidson, Larry Dorf, Ben Falcone & Rachel Ramras	November 8, 2011	1.69
During a lunch at Pizzarriba, Porky announces he has tickets to the playoff game. But when he eats what Daffy thinks are his french fries, Daffy refuses to speaks to Porky ever again. It was just a simple misunderstanding, but Porky cancels the trip to the game anyway. Meanwhile, Yosemite Sam practices a field goal to win $1 million, but with little success. Bugs tries to mend the rift between Daffy and Porky, but his plan backfires at the last minute, causing Porky to destroy the tickets for the game. Bugs tags along with Sam in another attempt to watch the game. While attempting the field goal, Sam injures his leg due to wearing cowboy boots with sharp heels, leaving Bugs to take his place, which is a success, as he makes the field goal attempt and wins the one million dollars that he donates to charity. Back at the restaurant, Speedy reveals that the french fries were compliments of the house and meant for the whole table. Guest Star: Powers Boothe as Leslie Hunt (cameo) Merrie Melodies: "Presidents' Day" by Lola Bunny
22	22	"Beauty School"	Jeff Siergey	Hugh Davidson, Larry Dorf & Rachel Ramras	November 15, 2011	1.95
While working on Tina's beauty school homework, Daffy helps her on difficult cuts and finds out that he enjoys it. However, Tina quits beauty school after getting sought for promotion at work, forcing Daffy to pose as Tina. Meanwhile, Bugs attends dance lessons with Porky under the identity of Cathy (in an attempt to prove that he looks good when he crossdresses after Daffy unintentionally dresses him like a girl while working on a wig), but this leads to Lola thinking Bugs isn't being faithful, and Speedy falls in love with his disguise. In the end, Daffy gets his cosmetologist license, Tina gets promoted, Bugs and Lola are still together, Porky meets a new lady friend, and Speedy is heartbroken. Merrie Melodies: "Giant Robot Love" by Daffy Duck featuring Porky Pig
23	23	"The Float"	Jeff Siergey	Hugh Davidson, Larry Dorf, Ben Falcone & Rachel Ramras	November 22, 2011	1.76
After his parade float is destroyed when he takes it to the car wash, Daffy cons Porky out of all his savings and splurges mercilessly in order to obtain a yacht to replace the float. When he finds out, Porky fights with Daffy as the yacht ends up drifting away from shore with Bugs after Daffy forgets to tie it to the dock. Bugs formulates an idea to safely make it back, but it backfires, as Daffy pushes Porky to the ocean to get help, prompting Bugs to help him, while Daffy seemingly drowns, only to find himself in a hospital being cared. In the end, the yacht is sold, restoring Porky's savings and his life back to order. However, in an ironic twist, Daffy ends up needing a new kidney (the lie he used for his deception), which Bugs pays for and Porky donates the new kidney. Guest Star: Garry Marshall as Doctor Weisberg Merrie Melodies: "You Like / I Like" by Mac and Tosh
24	24	"The Shelf"	Jeff Siergey	Hugh Davidson, Larry Dorf, Ben Falcone & Rachel Ramras	January 24, 2012	1.52
Bugs seeks to add a place for his Nobel Prize and plans to put up the shelf himself and refuses any help thinking he is capable of doing it himself because of his pride of winning a prestigious prize, but ends up destroying the house as a result. Because of an incident where Bugs accidentally drills into a water pipe, Daffy ends up bunking with Porky, and Lola tries to find Speedy a new home after Speedy decides to leave Bugs' home after Bugs' stubbornness to not get help from an expert on installing shelves and the fact that his mouse hole flooded. In the end, Tina helps Bugs restore his house and Speedy and Daffy go back to live with Bugs. Merrie Melodies: "Chintzy" by Daffy Duck featuring Porky Pig Road Runner and Wile E. Coyote: "Goner with the Wind"
25	25	"The Muh-Muh-Muh-Murder"	Jeff Siergey	Hugh Davidson, Larry Dorf, Ben Falcone & Rachel Ramras	January 31, 2012	1.30
After Bugs leaves Daffy and Porky at Pizzaribba to do an urgent issue, Daffy must stay at Porky's house, due to Daffy not having the keys to Bugs' house. Porky is reluctant on letting Daffy go with him to his house, as he is making birthday surprises for Daffy's birthday, which is to be taken place within a week. After Daffy sees a news report about the Suburban Strangler at Porky's place, he believes the description matches Porky, causing Daffy to think that Porky is the criminal, leading to subsequent events in which Daffy seemingly finds Porky acting and doing things in an immoral way. Meanwhile, Lola stays at Bugs' house for six weeks after she breaks her leg during a check-up with Dr. Weisberg, forcing him to deal with Lola's antics. In the end, Daffy learns that Porky's actions were based on his efforts to prevent Daffy from knowing his birthday surprises, and was not the criminal being identified on the news. Note: This is the only episode without both Wile E. Coyote and Road Runner CGI short and Merrie Melodies in Season 1.
26	26	"Point, Laser Point"	Mauricio Pardo & Jeff Siergey	Hugh Davidson, Larry Dorf & Rachel Ramras	February 7, 2012	1.52
While helping Porky set up an online profile, Bugs thinks that Granny is lonely due to her living with just Sylvester and Tweety. So Bugs and Daffy take her out to entertain her in various ways. Meanwhile, Sylvester becomes obsessed with a Laser Pointer toy which causes him problems when he tries to get the red dot. When this becomes a problem, Sylvester ends up seeking help from Witch Lezah who does hypnotic therapy on him with the red dot being a reflection from his mother's necklace. So Sylvester visits his mother, only for her to start nagging and criticizing him. Sylvester realizes his life is better off with Granny and goes back. Guest Star: Estelle Harris as Sylvester's mother Merrie Melodies: "Table for One" by Speedy Gonzales Road Runner and Wile E. Coyote: "Shut Your Trap" Note 1: The Sylvester and Tweety plot from this episode was from Laff Riot. Note 2: Wile E. Coyote makes an appearance in this episode outside of the Wile E. Coyote and Road Runner CGI shorts.

=== Season 2 (2012–13) ===
No. overall	No. in season	Title	Directed by	Written by	Original release date	U.S. viewers (millions)
27	1	"Bobcats on Three!"	Swinton Scott III	Hugh Davidson, Larry Dorf & Rachel Ramras	October 2, 2012	1.66
Gossamer approaches Daffy about him coaching his water polo team called the Bobcats, which being to lose until Daffy puts Gossamer as a goalie. Meanwhile, Bugs helps Porky with his catering by following the recipes of Porky's grandma which ends up getting Bugs hooked on the food since those recipes contained butter. In the end, Gossamer tells Daffy how he hates being a goalie. Daffy gives up winning the championship to make Gossamer happy and Bugs realizes his huge weight gain after splashing all the water out of the pool while rescuing Daffy and agrees to cut out eating Porky's cooking for a while. Merrie Melodies: "Laser Beam" by Marvin the Martian
28	2	"You've Got Hate Mail"	Seth Kearsley	Hugh Davidson, Larry Dorf & Rachel Ramras	October 9, 2012	1.71
When Daffy accidentally emails a letter to everyone he knows telling hateful things about them, he realizes he also sent it to Tina and teams up with Porky to erase it. Meanwhile, Lola and her parents want Bugs to be in their family photo, until Bugs chips one of his front teeth (during a fight with Daffy involving the main storyline) and Lola attempts to prevent him from being in the photo. Meanwhile, Yosemite Sam works to improve himself after reading Daffy's letter but reverts to his old self at the end of the episode. In the end, Tina ends up reading the letter but is fortunately unoffended by it and Bugs gets in the family photo after Walter, Patricia, and Lola accidentally chip their front teeth during Lola's prevention schemes. Guest Stars: John O'Hurley as Walter Bunny and Garry Marshall as Dr. Weisberg
29	3	"Itsy Bitsy Gopher"	Seth Kearsley	Hugh Davidson, Larry Dorf & Rachel Ramras	October 16, 2012	1.33
When Tosh goes missing, Daffy and Lola team up to find him. Meanwhile, Bugs tries to catch a large Sicarius that got into his house. Daffy and Lola create a missing poster for Tosh, but ended up picturing Speedy. Tosh is revealed to have only taken a walk; the note he left was overlooked by Daffy, who was using the same notepad to write clues. Bugs successfully releasing bug poison to be rid of the spider; however, Gossamer ends up ruining everything by saying his harmless pet spider, which only looks like an African sand spider, has gone missing. Bugs saved the spider, but finds Gossamer had located his true pet; the spider bites Bugs, paralyzing him for a time. At Pizzariba!, Daffy and Lola are treating Bugs, who has mostly recovered from the poisoning. They are then left wondering where Speedy is; Yosemite Sam saw their accidental poser and kidnapped Speedy to be taken to Mac for the reward for the previously missing Tosh. Guest Star: Garry Marshall as Doctor Weisberg Merrie Melodies: "Moostache" by Yosemite Sam's Moustache
30	4	"Rebel Without a Glove"	Seth Kearsley	Hugh Davidson, Larry Dorf & Rachel Ramras	October 23, 2012	1.57
Bugs loses his gloves and thinks he's lost his identity, so he goes in search of a replacement only to discover they just don't sell white gloves for men anymore and will have to wait, so he buys a pair of biker gloves and begins to take on the personality of a biker. Daffy, after learning the embarrassing definition of his name, changes it to Professor and ends up teaching Porky's political science class (despite not knowing anything about it) taking on the personality of a professor. Soon, the personality changed Bugs and Daffy began to act like they are in a 1950s teen film, until an annoyed Porky brings them back to normal by taking the things that made them act weird. In the end, Bugs gets his normal gloves back and Daffy changes his name back due to "Professor" being too hard for him to spell. Guest Stars: John O'Hurley as Walter Bunny Note: Wile E. Coyote and Road Runner made an appearance in this episode.
31	5	"Semper Lie"	Swinton Scott III & Jeff Siergey	Hugh Davidson, Larry Dorf & Rachel Ramras	October 30, 2012	1.49
In order to get out of going to the Peach Festival with Porky, Bugs tells a lie that gets out of hand when Lola starts believing it and ends with Daffy joining the US Marines, which Daffy erroneously thinks is a group that views marine life. Bugs poses as his sister, Viola, and boards a plane out of the country. Attempting to return home, Bugs is suspected to be a spy when he does not appear as he does in his license and he is imprisoned. He is later rescued by Daffy's group. At Pizzariba!, Bugs is horrified to learn that he was imprisoned for exactly one year from his scheme. Bugs gives up and goes with Porky to the festival. Daffy leaves the Marines under the guise that he has flat feet.
32	6	"Father Figures"	Swinton Scott III	Hugh Davidson, Larry Dorf & Rachel Ramras	November 6, 2012	1.62
Lola's father, Walter, enters himself and Bugs in a country club's father and son tennis tournament as he considers Bugs to be like a son to him. Walter puts Bugs through the training for the tournament as part of a bonding experience while Bugs finds that Walter is terrible at tennis. Meanwhile, Daffy joins Porky in the Father Figure Program. While Porky is the father figure of Henery Hawk, who is obsessed with wanting to eat chicken, Daffy gets a father figure in Foghorn, despite objection from Foghorn's assistant Carol as Daffy was the one who ruined Foghorn's film and destroyed EnormoCorp. In the end, no one wins the tournament due to Henery biting Foghorn's butt when Porky takes him to watch the tennis tournament. Luckily, everything works out; Bugs decides to continue bonding with Walter by participating in a father and son golf tournament, Porky gives Henery chicken, Henery decides to keep Porky as his father figure, and Foghorn and Daffy decide to continue the charade and go square dancing despite Carol ratting Daffy out. Guest Stars: Ben Falcone as Henery Hawk, John O'Hurley as Walter Bunny and Garry Marshall as Dr. Weisberg
33	7	"Customer Service"	Seth Kearsley	Story by : Steve Mallory; Teleplay by : Hugh Davidson, Larry Dorf & Rachel Ramras	November 13, 2012	1.78
After Trans-Visitron shuts off Bugs' cable, he seeks revenge on the company's sadistic customer service representative Cecil Turtle, who intentionally cut his cable and drives Bugs crazy by providing him poor service. Meanwhile, Daffy gets a job as a customer service representative supervisor at Trans-Visitron and begins to fire everyone. At the same time, Tina approaches Lola about how to be positive and upbeat after she is suspended from her job for getting angry at a customer. In the end, Tina gets her job back after using her bad attitude to stop Yosemite Sam from illegally photocopying money, Bugs successfully gets Cecil to turn his cable back on, and Daffy is fired for firing all of the staff without justification. Guest Stars: Jim Rash as Cecil Turtle and Michael Serrato as Giovanni Jones
34	8	"The Stud, the Nerd, the Average Joe, and the Saint"	Seth Kearsley	Hugh Davidson, Larry Dorf & Rachel Ramras	November 20, 2012	1.54
In an attempt to keep his supposed "place" in his group of friends, Daffy competes with Porky in a marathon. Daffy ends up being trained by Speedy but this proves difficult due to Daffy's poor diet. Meanwhile, Yosemite Sam is determined to repay Bugs for saving his life and temporarily forgets about getting his guns back. After eating a large breakfast, Daffy can't run very far. Porky carries him the rest of the way and is declared a town hero. Speedy wins the marathon in a few seconds. Yosemite Sam is also arrested for stealing the starter pistol meant for the marathon. Guest Star: Garry Marshall as Doctor Weisberg
35	9	"It's a Handbag"	Swinton Scott III	Hugh Davidson, Larry Dorf & Rachel Ramras	November 27, 2012	1.62
Daffy's handbag has gone missing during his time at the mall's food court and Daffy goes into a state of depression. Bugs goes to the mall to look for a new handbag, which Daffy claims to be irreplaceable. While out at the mall, Lola mistakes Bugs getting Daffy a new handbag as a gift for their anniversary, so she tries hard to find Bugs a gift, but is unsuccessful. Daffy uses Witch Lezah's hypnosis to identify who stole his handbag, a mall security guard. Daffy finds his handbag in the mall's lost and found.
36	10	"A Christmas Carol"	Swinton Scott III, Spike Brandt & Tony Cervone	Hugh Davidson, Larry Dorf & Rachel Ramras	December 4, 2012	2.01
When the overwhelming heat zaps everyone's enthusiasm for Christmas, Lola decides to stage a production of A Christmas Carol to renew the town's holiday spirit and the fact that the local theater has air conditioning where she casts Bugs, Porky, Speedy, Yosemite Sam, and the Gophers in her play. However, Lola instead of following the plot of the book stages her madcap version of the play. Meanwhile, Foghorn and Daffy set off for the North Pole to set up a giant fan that will blow cold air down to their sweltering town, which becomes impossible due to the fan not having the power source for its plug to connect to. When Daffy fails to put the plug in, the job is done by Santa Claus upon his arrival at Lola's play. Afterwards, it miraculously begins to snow and the characters sing a musical number to end the episode. Guest Stars: Barry Corbin as Santa Claus and Ben Falcone as Henery Hawk (cameo) Merrie Melodies (without logo, as part of the episode): "Christmas Rules"
37	11	"We're in Big Truffle"	Swinton Scott III	Hugh Davidson, Larry Dorf & Rachel Ramras	January 22, 2013	1.79
After learning that truffles are extremely expensive Daffy convinces Porky to help him with a get-rich-quick scheme of his. While looking for truffles, Daffy and Porky get lost in the woods. Meanwhile, Bugs watches over Gossamer while Witch Lezah is at a Witch's Convention in the 5th Dimension and receives reluctant help from Lola. But Lola accidentally turns Gossamer into a frog and Gossamer's alarm clock into a big angry grizzly bear that escapes to the woods and attack Porky and Daffy. While Lola and Bugs are trying to find the spell that Lola did, to turn Gossamer back to normal, Gossamer (as a frog) escapes and they are trying to save him from getting eaten by Taz. In the meantime Lezah calls Bugs to see how Gossamer is doing and explains how to find the spell. But when Lola does the spell, they find out that the alarm clock was the frog and Gossamer was the grizzly bear. Daffy finds Gossamer as a bear and brings him back along with a truffle, only for Speedy to reveal it is actually a potato and that truffles are only found in Europe.
38	12	"Dear John"	Seth Kearsley	Hugh Davidson, Larry Dorf & Rachel Ramras	January 29, 2013	1.76
After watching a movie together, Bugs explains to Lola what a Dear John letter is. Mutual mix-ups and misinterpretations lead to Lola and Bugs thinking that each of them want break up with each other; Bugs needed a repairman named John to fix his microwave and left a note saying it didn't work, and Lola, not wanting any pests invading her home, left a note saying she did not want to see any more bugs. Lola joins a monastery where she undergoes a year of a vow of silence while Bugs travels the seas. Meanwhile, Daffy learns that Porky is on the city council and, wanting to experience the perks himself, gets elected to city council, only to find it boring and time consuming. He tries to use his bad attitude as an excuse to be removed, only for the public to love it and becomes immensely popular. A year later, Bugs and Lola learn of the misunderstanding and get back together while Daffy, who has become so popular the public wants to make his spot on the council permanent, fakes his death to escape his responsibilities and a statue is erected in his "memory". Merrie Melodies: "Drifting Apart" by Mac and Tosh
39	13	"Daffy Duck, Esquire"	Seth Kearsley	Story by : Steve Borst; Teleplay by : Hugh Davidson, Larry Dorf & Rachel Ramras	February 5, 2013	1.55
When Tina's father Frank comes for a visit, Daffy pretends to be a lawyer in order to impress him as a suggestion from Lola. Daffy persuades Bugs to act as his slacker roommate. During Daffy's time as a lawyer with Lola acting as his secretary, his first client is Yosemite Sam who burnt the roof of his mouth on a hot pizza and wants Daffy to sue Pizzarriba. After learning through Speedy Gonzales that Daffy is not a real lawyer, the judge quickly closes the case. In an ironic twist, Frank begins to like Daffy's real personality through Bugs than Daffy's staged personality. Fortunately, Daffy is unable to keep up the charade and reveals his true self to Frank, who happily approves of his and Tina's relationship. Guest Star: Dennis Farina as Frank Russo
40	14	"Spread Those Wings and Fly"	Ethan Spaulding	Hugh Davidson, Larry Dorf & Rachel Ramras	February 12, 2013	1.72
After misunderstanding the metaphor "spread your wings and fly" at a self-help seminar held by Wieb Lunk, Daffy is inspired learn how to fly. Meanwhile, Bugs and Yosemite Sam end up in a feud when they both suspect each other of stealing each other's stuff. It turns out that Daffy was stealing the stuff in his sleep while listening to the self-help CDs. To make up for accusing Sam, Bugs gives him his replacement Nobel Prize. Guest Star: Brian Regan as Wieb Lunk
41	15	"The Black Widow"	Seth Kearsley	Hugh Davidson, Larry Dorf & Rachel Ramras	April 23, 2013	1.80
Daffy wants to go on spring break for fun and drags a reluctant Porky along, only to end up in a sleepy Mexican town. Lola loses her mother's bracelet and uses a movie persona to fake that someone stole it. She and Bugs find out that Lola was wearing it on her ankle the entire time. After streaking in the Mexican town, Daffy and Porky get thrown into prison, even though Daffy is already naked and Porky never wears pants. Fortunately the sheriff is Speedy's cousin, Slowpoke Rodriguez, and Speedy bails them out. Guest Star: John O'Hurley as Walter Bunny
42	16	"Mrs. Porkbunny's"	Ethan Spaulding	Hugh Davidson, Larry Dorf & Rachel Ramras	April 30, 2013	1.34
Porky and Bugs decide to start a business together selling carrot cake to capitalize on Porky's fine cooking skills and Bugs' acute gardening skills (which he started due to the supermarket no longer selling big carrots). Foghorn then convinces them into signing on with a big-brand company, but Bugs and Porky end up arguing on the name and marketing of the cake. Daffy attempts to become an actor in commercials and begins to fail repeatedly. While Daffy manages to land a commercial advertising Bugs and Porky's but his bad acting causes the product to flop before it even hit the shelves. Merrie Melodies: "Stick to My Guns" by Yosemite Sam
43	17	"Gribbler's Quest"	Seth Kearsley	Hugh Davidson, Larry Dorf & Rachel Ramras	May 7, 2013	1.50
Daffy must shake an online shopping addiction because the quick click is connected to Bugs' bank account. Daffy is dragged by Yosemite Sam into a group therapy, which helps Daffy to briefly change his ways. Bugs is addicted to a video game called "Gribbler's Quest IV: Elves vs. Fairies vs. Griblets.". After learning that Bugs was addicted to the game because he liked playing the game, Daffy decides that he was addicted to online shopping because he liked online shopping and he quits group therapy, much to the dismay and protests of Tina and Porky. Merrie Melodies: "I Love to Sing-A" by Gossamer/"Parade Float" featuring Daffy Duck Note: This is the only episode with two Merrie Melodies, with the former song being one of only two of the show's Merrie Melodies using a classic song rather than a new composition with the other instance being "Yellow Bird".
44	18	"The Grand Old Duck of York"	Ethan Spaulding	Hugh Davidson, Larry Dorf & Rachel Ramras	May 14, 2013	1.48
After a choking experience at Pizzariba's all-you-can-eat buffet, Daffy takes piano lessons from Granny prompting Bugs to get noise-cancelling headphones while getting a new TV to replace the one that Daffy sold to get his piano. Soon, Bugs realizes they come in handy for more than just blocking out Daffy's playing when it comes to blocking out Yosemite Sam's complaints and Porky's discussion on his recurring dream; he pretends to be listening and gives correct responses. Meanwhile, a new restaurant called Sullivan's opens across the street from Pizzariba and Speedy goes into competition against the restaurant. When it comes to Speedy's musical event, Bugs convinces Daffy (who had quit the piano lessons) to arrange the musical event, and in turn, Daffy arranges for Winnie Yang, Granny's prodigious piano student, to play the piano at Speedy's musical event. Sometime later, Speedy drives the competition out of business, Daffy resumes the piano lessons, and Granny gives him a gold star. After Daffy leaves, Granny takes out the noise-cancelling headphones and states that she'll have to thank Bugs for the headphones. Merrie Melodies: "Daffy's Legacy" by Daffy Duck featuring Bugs Bunny
45	19	"Ridiculous Journey"	Seth Kearsley	Story by : Seth Kearsley & Paul Rugg; Teleplay by : Seth Kearsley	May 21, 2013	1.67
After accidentally getting shipped to Alaska by Yosemite Sam, Taz, Tweety, and Sylvester join forces on a long journey home. They end up being tracked by a tracker named Blacque Jacque Shellacque. In the end, they make it home when it turns out that Blacque was hired by Yosemite Sam to retrieve the three on behalf of Bugs and Granny. Note: This is the only episode in which Bugs and Daffy have minor roles.
46	20	"The Shell Game"	Ethan Spaulding	Hugh Davidson, Larry Dorf & Rachel Ramras	June 25, 2013	1.52
Bugs replaces Daffy's broken recliner with a new one much to the objection of Daffy due to the recliner being his only possession. Bugs and Daffy have a run-in with Cecil Turtle where they discover that they got his shell cracked. While helping Cecil, Bugs discovers that Cecil has been scamming people by pretending to get his shell cracked and suing them; then Bugs attempts to stop Porky from being tricked by Cecil. Meanwhile, Lola and Daffy try to find a replacement for the latter's recliner. In the end, Bugs stops Cecil by using Daffy's recliner, resulting in Cecil's shell cracking for real, and Daffy gets his recliner back. Guest Star: Jim Rash as Cecil Turtle Merrie Melodies: "Wonderful Bugs" by Walter Bunny
47	21	"Year of the Duck"	Seth Kearsley	Hugh Davidson, Larry Dorf & Rachel Ramras	July 23, 2013	1.69
Daffy is highly insulted when he discovers that ducks are not included in the Chinese zodiac and learns from Foghorn that ducks are #64 on the Animal Popularity index. In an attempt to make ducks more popular, he talks Tina into entering a local beauty pageant. Meanwhile, Porky thinks it's the Chinese Year of the Pig and is convinced he should host the pageant to capitalize on it being "his time", but Bugs finds out that Porky was wrong and that it's really the year of the Rabbit. Porky flops as host of the pageant and Tina helps bring the popularity of ducks up despite not winning. To thank her, Daffy gives Tina a tiara.
48	22	"Gossamer is Awesomer"	Ethan Spaulding	Hugh Davidson, Larry Dorf & Rachel Ramras	July 30, 2013	1.36
Daffy becomes campaign manager for Gossamer's run for Class President, taking things too far. Meanwhile, Porky moves in with Bugs and Daffy after his catering business goes broke and spends his days reorganizing everything in Bugs and Daffy's house much to Bugs' dismay.
49	23	"Here Comes the Pig"	Seth Kearsley	Hugh Davidson, Larry Dorf & Rachel Ramras	August 13, 2013	1.32
Daffy accompanies Porky to the wedding of Brian Patrick Kennedy IV and Becky A. Hogg so they can stop it, thinking Becky is Porky's true love. Meanwhile, Bugs finds that without Daffy around, life is boring. Note: Wile E. Coyote and Road Runner made an appearance in this episode.
50	24	"Mr. Wiener"	Ethan Spaulding	Hugh Davidson, Larry Dorf & Rachel Ramras	August 20, 2013	1.53
Daffy enters a hot dog-eating contest while Bugs helps Yosemite Sam perform a stunt jumping a bus over a row of motorcycles. Daffy practices for the contest while Porky follows Daffy's rules on how to stay cool with Petunia (who Porky met in the previous episode). Meanwhile, Bugs attempts to soothe his rapidly beating heart when his doctor fears that he will have a heart attack. Guest Stars: Katy Mixon as Petunia Pig and Garry Marshall as Dr. Weisberg
51	25	"Super Rabbit"	Ethan Spaulding, Spike Brandt & Tony Cervone	Mark Banker	November 8, 2013 (Note: "Super Rabbit" was skipped when the series first aired in the United States, but aired in proper sequence overseas. It did not air in the U.S. until August 31, 2014. The date is of the first overseas airing, and the viewership is from the delayed U.S. airing.)	1.03
While Daffy tries to steal Bugs' stuff to pay for a present for Tina, Bugs tells him the story about Super Rabbit (Bugs' version of Superman) and his battle with Brainiac (Marvin the Martian), Lex Luthor (Elmer Fudd) and Kryptonian criminals General Zod (Daffy Duck), Faora, and Thunkian (a robot with "the intellect and personality of a lost sock"). Following the fight, Bugs learns that power corrupts unless it's balanced with humility. In the final scene, Bat Rabbit (Bugs' version of Batman) rescues Daffy and Tina from a mugger.
52	26	"Best Friends Redux"	Seth Kearsley	Hugh Davidson, Larry Dorf & Rachel Ramras	August 27, 2013	1.57
Daffy is jealous when Bugs meets up with an old friend named Rodney Rabbit and starts to feel left out. To make sure that he is still Bugs' friend, Daffy uses the time vortex at Witch Lezah's house to go back in time and ensure Bugs and Rodney never meet each other. When history is changed so that nobody knows Daffy, Witch Lezah (who was unaffected by the time change) sends Daffy back in time to correct it since Rodney is the reason that Bugs first met Daffy. Meanwhile, Porky wonders about his ranking in Daffy's list of best friends. Guest Star: Chuck Deezy as Rodney Rabbit Merrie Melodies: "Long-Eared Drifter" sung by Damon Jones featuring Bugs Bunny and Daffy Duck
