= Speedy Gonzales (film) =

- Title card
- Directed by: I. Freleng
- Story by: Warren Foster
- Starring: Mel Blanc (all other voices); Stan Freberg (Mice - uncredited)
- Music by: Carl Stalling
- Animation by: Gerry Chiniquy; Ted Bonnicksen; Arthur Davis; Harry Love (uncredited)
- Layouts by: Hawley Pratt
- Backgrounds by: Irv Wyner
- Color process: Technicolor
- Production company: Warner Bros. Cartoons
- Distributed by: Warner Bros. Pictures
- Release date: September 17, 1955
- Running time: 6:45
- Country: United States
- Language: English

Speedy Gonzales is a 1955 Warner Bros. Merrie Melodies animated short directed by Friz Freleng from a story by Warren Foster. The short was released on September 17, 1955, and stars Speedy Gonzales and Sylvester.

== Plot ==
The short opens on a group of starving Mexican mice thinking of how to get cheese from the AJAX cheese factory across the Mexico–United States border that is guarded by Sylvester, who has eaten any mouse who have tried to pass over. After losing another one of their group, the leader then decides to gain the services of the aptly named "Speedy Gonzales", the fastest mouse in all of Mexico, who the leader claims is a friend of his sister's. The group is doubtful of his claims (with one mouse jokingly remarking that Speedy is a "friend of everybody's sister"), but the leader goes to get him anyway. He finds Speedy at the carnival attraction "Shoot Speedy", in which he volunteers to let people try to shoot him with an actual gun in order to "win a beeg prize", and tells Speedy (in Spanish) about the dire situation he and his fellow mice are in, and Speedy agrees to help.

Upon arriving at the border, the mice celebrate his arrival while Sylvester readies himself to catch Speedy. Speedy then demonstrates his incredible speed as he quickly runs across the border to fetch an armful of cheese with each turn. After failing to catch Speedy by hand, Sylvester employs equipment such as a hand net, mousetraps, landmines, baseball equipment, and a pipe to funnel Speedy right into his mouth, but Speedy manages to thwart him every time, with Sylvester getting maimed in almost every attempt. When Speedy boldly declares that he will get all the cheese in the factory in one swoop, Sylvester becomes fed up and gathers all the cheese from the factory, stacks it, and uses dynamite to blow it all up in an act of spite. However, all the cheese ends up raining down on the mice, causing Sylvester to cry and bang his head on an electric pole in vexation. Speedy ends the short by saying: "I like this pussycat fellow; he's silly!"

== Production notes ==
Speedy Gonzales won the Academy Award for Best Animated Short Film in 1955.

This short marks the first appearance of a redesign for Speedy, after his initial appearance in Cat-Tails for Two.

== Home media ==
Speedy Gonzales can be found on Disc 4 of the Looney Tunes Golden Collection: Volume 1 DVD, Disc 1 of the Warner Bros. Home Entertainment Academy Awards Animation Collection, and Disc 1 of the Looney Tunes Platinum Collection: Volume 1 Blu-ray.

== See also ==
- List of American films of 1955
