= 2007–08 United States network television schedule (daytime) =

The following is the 2007–08 daytime network television schedule for the five major English-language commercial broadcast networks in the United States. It covers the weekday daytime hours from September 2007 to August 2008. The schedule is followed by a list per network of returning series, and any series canceled after the 2006–07 season.

Affiliates fill time periods not occupied by network programs with local or syndicated programming. PBS – which offers daytime programming through a children's program block, PBS Kids – is not included, as its member television stations have local flexibility over most of their schedules and broadcast times for network shows may vary. Also not included are stations affiliated with The CW Plus and MyNetworkTV, as they have never offered a daytime network schedule or aired network news, and Ion Television, as its schedule is composed mainly of programming from its Qubo block and syndicated reruns.

== Legend ==
- Light blue indicates local programming.
- Gray indicates encore programming.
- Yellow indicates talk shows.
- Pink indicates game shows.
- Chartreuse indicates soap operas.
- Blue-gray indicates news programming.
- Light green indicates sporting events.
- Light purple indicates children's and/or E/I-compliant programming.
- Light teal indicates programs not applicable to the above categorizations.
- New series are highlighted in **bold**.

== Schedule ==
- All times correspond to U.S. Eastern and Pacific Time scheduling (except for some live sports or events). Except where affiliates slot certain programs outside their network-dictated timeslots, subtract one hour for Central, Mountain, Alaska, and Hawaii–Aleutian times.
- Local schedules may differ, as affiliates have the option to pre-empt or delay network programs. Such scheduling may be limited to preemptions caused by local or national breaking news or weather coverage (which may force stations to tape delay certain programs in overnight timeslots or defer them to a co-operated station or a digital subchannel in their regular timeslot) and any major sports events scheduled to air in a weekday timeslot (mainly during major holidays). Stations may air shows at other times at their preference.

=== Weekdays ===
Network	6:00 a.m.	6:30 a.m.	7:00 a.m.	7:30 a.m.	8:00 a.m.	8:30 a.m.	9:00 a.m.	9:30 a.m.	10:00 a.m.	10:30 a.m.	11:00 a.m.	11:30 a.m.	Noon	12:30 p.m.	1:00 p.m.	1:30 p.m.	2:00 p.m.	2:30 p.m.	3:00 p.m.	3:30 p.m.	4:00 p.m.	4:30 p.m.	5:00 p.m.	5:30 p.m.	6:00 p.m.	6:30 p.m.	7:00 p.m.	7:30 p.m.
ABC	Local and/or syndicated programming		Good Morning America				Local and/or syndicated programming				The View		Local and/or syndicated programming		All My Children		One Life to Live		General Hospital		Local and/or syndicated programming					ABC World News Tonight with Charles Gibson	Local and/or syndicated programming	
CBS	Local and/or syndicated programming		The Early Show				Local and/or syndicated programming				The Price Is Right		Local and/or syndicated programming	The Young and the Restless		The Bold and the Beautiful	As the World Turns		Guiding Light		Local and/or syndicated programming					CBS Evening News with Katie Couric	Local and/or syndicated programming	
NBC	Local and/or syndicated programming		Today								Local and/or syndicated programming				Days of Our Lives		Local and/or syndicated programming									NBC Nightly News with Brian Williams	Local and/or syndicated programming	
The CW	Local and/or syndicated programming																				All of Us (R)		What I Like About You (R)	Reba (R)		Local and/or syndicated programming		

Note:

- ABC, NBC and CBS offer their early morning newscasts via a looping feed (usually running as late as 10:00 a.m. Pacific Time) to accommodate local scheduling in the westernmost contiguous time zones or for use a filler programming for stations that do not offer a local morning newscast; some stations without a morning newscast may air syndicated or time-lease programs instead of the full newscast loop.
- CBS delayed the start of The Price Is Right's 36th season by one month (until October 15, 2007) in order to allow the show to transition into its new host, Drew Carey (Bob Barker, whom Carey replaced, had retired as host of the program in June 2007 at the end of the game show's 35th season).

=== Saturday ===
Network		6:00 a.m.	6:30 a.m.	7:00 a.m.	7:30 a.m.	8:00 a.m.	8:30 a.m.	9:00 a.m.	9:30 a.m.	10:00 a.m.	10:30 a.m.	11:00 a.m.	11:30 a.m.	Noon	12:30 p.m.	1:00 p.m.	1:30 p.m.	2:00 p.m.	2:30 p.m.	3:00 p.m.	3:30 p.m.	4:00 p.m.	4:30 p.m.	5:00 p.m.	5:30 p.m.	6:00 p.m.	6:30 p.m.	7:00 p.m.	7:30 p.m.
ABC	Fall	Local and/or syndicated programming				Good Morning America		The Emperor's New School (R)	The Replacements (R)	That's So Raven (R)		Hannah Montana (R)	The Suite Life of Zack and Cody (R)	Power Rangers Operation Overdrive		ESPN College Football on ABC													College Football Scoreboard
ABC	Winter	Local and/or syndicated programming				Good Morning America		The Emperor's New School (R)	The Replacements (R)	That's So Raven (R)		Hannah Montana (R)	The Suite Life of Zack and Cody (R)	Power Rangers Operation Overdrive		NBA Access with Ahmad Rashad	ESPN on ABC and/or local programming			ESPN on ABC programming						Local and/or syndicated programming	ABC World News Saturday	Local and/or syndicated programming	
ABC	Spring	Local and/or syndicated programming				Good Morning America		The Emperor's New School (R)	The Replacements (R)	That's So Raven (R)		Hannah Montana (R)	The Suite Life of Zack and Cody (R)	**Power Rangers Jungle Fury**		NBA Access with Ahmad Rashad	ESPN on ABC and/or local programming			ESPN on ABC programming						Local and/or syndicated programming	ABC World News Saturday	Local and/or syndicated programming	
CBS	Fall	Local and/or syndicated programming		Care Bears: Adventures in Care-a-lot	Strawberry Shortcake	Cake	Horseland	The Saturday Early Show				Sabrina: The Animated Series	Trollz	College Football Today	SEC on CBS													Local and/or syndicated programming	
CBS	Mid-fall	Local and/or syndicated programming		Care Bears: Adventures in Care-a-lot	Strawberry Shortcake	Cake	Horseland	The Saturday Early Show				**Sushi Pack**	**Dino Squad**	College Football Today	SEC on CBS													Local and/or syndicated programming	
CBS	Winter	Local and/or syndicated programming		Care Bears: Adventures in Care-a-lot	Strawberry Shortcake	Cake	Horseland	The Saturday Early Show				**Sushi Pack**	**Dino Squad**	College Basketball on CBS												Local and/or syndicated programming	CBS Weekend News	Local and/or syndicated programming	
CBS	Spring	Local and/or syndicated programming		Care Bears: Adventures in Care-a-lot	Strawberry Shortcake	Cake	Horseland	The Saturday Early Show				**Sushi Pack**	**Dino Squad**	Local, syndicated and/or CBS Sports programming						PGA Tour on CBS						Local and/or syndicated programming	CBS Weekend News	Local and/or syndicated programming	
The CW	Fall	Local and/or syndicated programming		Will & Dewitt	Magi-Nation	Tom and Jerry Tales		**Skunk Fu!**	Shaggy & Scooby-Doo Get a Clue!	**Eon Kid**	Johnny Test	Legion of Super Heroes	The Batman	Local and/or syndicated programming															
The CW	Late fall	Local and/or syndicated programming		Will & Dewitt	Magi-Nation	Shaggy & Scooby-Doo Get a Clue!	Tom and Jerry Tales	**Skunk Fu!**	Teen Titans	**Eon Kid**	Johnny Test	Legion of Super Heroes	The Batman	Local and/or syndicated programming															
The CW	Winter	Local and/or syndicated programming		Will & Dewitt	Magi-Nation	Shaggy & Scooby-Doo Get a Clue!	Tom and Jerry Tales	**Skunk Fu!**	Johnny Test	Teen Titans	**Eon Kid**	Legion of Super Heroes	The Batman	Local and/or syndicated programming															
The CW	Late winter	Local and/or syndicated programming		Will & Dewitt	Magi-Nation	**Skunk Fu!**	Tom and Jerry Tales		Legion of Super Heroes	**The Spectacular Spider-Man**	**World of Quest**	Johnny Test	**Eon Kid**	Local and/or syndicated programming															
The CW	Spring	Local and/or syndicated programming		Will & Dewitt	Magi-Nation	Tom and Jerry Tales		Chaotic	**The Spectacular Spider-Man**		Teenage Mutant Ninja Turtles: Fast Forward	Yu-Gi-Oh! GX	The Batman	Local and/or syndicated programming															
The CW	Summer	Local and/or syndicated programming		Will & Dewitt	Magi-Nation	Tom and Jerry Tales		The Spectacular Spider-Man	Chaotic		Teenage Mutant Ninja Turtles: Fast Forward	Yu-Gi-Oh! GX	Yu-Gi-Oh! GX	Local and/or syndicated programming															
Fox	Fall	Local and/or syndicated programming				**The Adrenaline Project**	Yu-Gi-Oh! GX	Chaotic	Teenage Mutant Ninja Turtles		**Dinosaur King**	Viva Piñata	Sonic X (R)	Local, syndicated and/or Fox Sports programming														Local and/or syndicated programming	
Fox	Late fall	Local and/or syndicated programming				**The Adrenaline Project**	**Dinosaur King**	Chaotic	Teenage Mutant Ninja Turtles		**Dinosaur King**	Viva Piñata	Yu-Gi-Oh! GX	Local, syndicated and/or Fox Sports programming														Local and/or syndicated programming	
Fox	Winter	Local and/or syndicated programming				Viva Piñata		Chaotic	Teenage Mutant Ninja Turtles		**Dinosaur King**	Yu-Gi-Oh! GX	**The Adrenaline Project**	Local, syndicated and/or Fox Sports programming														Local and/or syndicated programming	
Fox	Mid-winter	Local and/or syndicated programming				Viva Piñata		Chaotic		Teenage Mutant Ninja Turtles	**Dinosaur King**	Yu-Gi-Oh! GX	**The Adrenaline Project**	Local, syndicated and/or Fox Sports programming														Local and/or syndicated programming	
Fox	Spring	Local and/or syndicated programming				Viva Piñata		Chaotic		Teenage Mutant Ninja Turtles	**Dinosaur King**	Yu-Gi-Oh! GX	Winx Club	Local, syndicated and/or Fox Sports programming							This Week in Baseball	Fox Saturday Baseball (continued to game completion)						Local and/or syndicated programming	
Fox	Late spring	Local and/or syndicated programming				Viva Piñata		Teenage Mutant Ninja Turtles		Sonic X (R)	**Dinosaur King**	Kirby: Right Back at Ya! (R)	Winx Club	Local, syndicated and/or Fox Sports programming							This Week in Baseball	Fox Saturday Baseball (continued to game completion)						Local and/or syndicated programming	
Fox	Summer	Local and/or syndicated programming				Di-Gata Defenders	**Biker Mice from Mars**	Teenage Mutant Ninja Turtles		Sonic X (R)	**Dinosaur King**	Kirby: Right Back at Ya! (R)	Winx Club	Local, syndicated and/or Fox Sports programming							This Week in Baseball	Fox Saturday Baseball (continued to game completion)						Local and/or syndicated programming	
NBC	Fall	Local and/or syndicated programming				Today				**Postman Pat**	Dragon	**My Friend Rabbit**	3-2-1 Penguins!	VeggieTales	Jane and the Dragon	Local, syndicated and/or NBC Sports programming			Notre Dame Football on NBC							Local and/or syndicated programming	NBC Nightly News	Local and/or syndicated programming	
NBC	Mid-fall	Local and/or syndicated programming				Today				Jacob Two-Two	Dragon	**My Friend Rabbit**	3-2-1 Penguins!	VeggieTales	Jane and the Dragon	Local, syndicated and/or NBC Sports programming			Notre Dame Football on NBC							Local and/or syndicated programming	NBC Nightly News	Local and/or syndicated programming	
NBC	Winter	Local and/or syndicated programming				Today				Jacob Two-Two	Dragon	**My Friend Rabbit**	3-2-1 Penguins!	VeggieTales	Jane and the Dragon	Local, syndicated and/or NBC Sports programming				Golf Channel on NBC						Local and/or syndicated programming	NBC Nightly News	Local and/or syndicated programming	
NBC	Spring	Local and/or syndicated programming				Today				Jacob Two-Two	Dragon	**My Friend Rabbit**	3-2-1 Penguins!	VeggieTales	Jane and the Dragon	Local, syndicated and/or NBC Sports programming										Local and/or syndicated programming	NBC Nightly News	Local and/or syndicated programming	
NBC	Summer	Local and/or syndicated programming				Today				Jane and the Dragon	**The Zula Patrol**	3-2-1 Penguins!	VeggieTales	Babar	My Friend Rabbit	Local, syndicated and/or NBC Sports programming										Local and/or syndicated programming	NBC Nightly News	Local and/or syndicated programming	

=== Sunday ===
Network		6:00 a.m.	6:30 a.m.	7:00 a.m.	7:30 a.m.	8:00 a.m.	8:30 a.m.	9:00 a.m.	9:30 a.m.	10:00 a.m.	10:30 a.m.	11:00 a.m.	11:30 a.m.	Noon	12:30 p.m.	1:00 p.m.	1:30 p.m.	2:00 p.m.	2:30 p.m.	3:00 p.m.	3:30 p.m.	4:00 p.m.	4:30 p.m.	5:00 p.m.	5:30 p.m.	6:00 p.m.	6:30 p.m.
ABC		Local and/or syndicated programming		Good Morning America Weekend		Local and/or syndicated programming		This Week with George Stephanopoulos		Local and/or syndicated programming		Local, syndicated and/or ESPN on ABC sports programming		Local, Syndicated And/or ESPN on ABC sports programming												Local and/or syndicated programming	ABC World News Tonight
CBS	Fall	Local and/or syndicated programming						CBS News Sunday Morning			Face the Nation	Local and/or syndicated programming		The NFL Today		NFL on CBS (continued until game completion)											
CBS	Winter	Local and/or syndicated programming						CBS News Sunday Morning			Face the Nation	Local and/or syndicated programming		College Basketball on CBS												Local and/or syndicated programming	CBS Weekend News
CBS	Spring	Local and/or syndicated programming						CBS News Sunday Morning			Face the Nation	Local and/or syndicated programming		Local, Syndicated and/or CBS Sports programming						PGA Tour on CBS						Local and/or syndicated programming	CBS Weekend News
CBS	Summer	Local and/or syndicated programming						CBS News Sunday Morning			Face the Nation	Local and/or syndicated programming		Local, Syndicated and/or CBS Sports programming												Local and/or syndicated programming	CBS Weekend News
The CW	Fall	Local and/or syndicated programming																						Girlfriends (R)	The Game (R)	**Gossip Girl** (R)	
The CW	Winter	Local and/or syndicated programming																						Girlfriends (R)	The Game (R)	One Tree Hill (R)	
The CW	Late winter	Local and/or syndicated programming																						Everybody Hates Chris (R)	The Game (R)	One Tree Hill (R)	
The CW	Spring	Local and/or syndicated programming																						Everybody Hates Chris (R)	The Game (R)	Gossip Girl (R)	
Fox	Fall	Local and/or syndicated programming						Fox News Sunday		Local and/or syndicated programming				Fox NFL Sunday		Fox NFL (continued to game completion)											
Fox	Winter	Local and/or syndicated programming						Fox News Sunday		Local and/or syndicated programming				Local, syndicated and/or Fox Sports programming				NASCAR on Fox								Local and/or syndicated programming	
Fox	Spring	Local and/or syndicated programming						Fox News Sunday		Local and/or syndicated programming				Local, syndicated and/or Fox Sports programming													
NBC	Fall	Local and/or syndicated programming		Today		Local and/or syndicated programming		Meet the Press		Local and/or syndicated programming				Local, syndicated and/or NBC Sports programming												Local and/or syndicated programming	NBC Nightly News
NBC	Winter	Local and/or syndicated programming		Today		Local and/or syndicated programming		Meet the Press		Local and/or syndicated programming				NHL on NBC						PGA Tour on NBC						Local and/or syndicated programming	NBC Nightly News
NBC	Spring	Local and/or syndicated programming		Today		Local and/or syndicated programming		Meet the Press		Local and/or syndicated programming				Local, syndicated and/or NBC Sports programming												Local and/or syndicated programming	NBC Nightly News

== By network ==
=== ABC ===
Returning series:

- All My Children
- America This Morning
- General Hospital
- Good Morning America
- One Life to Live
- This Week with George Stephanopoulos
- The View
- World News with Charles Gibson
- ABC Kids
  - The Emperor's New School (reruns)
  - Hannah Montana (reruns)
  - NBA Access with Ahmad Rashad
  - Power Rangers Operation Overdrive
  - The Replacements (reruns)
  - The Suite Life of Zack & Cody (reruns)
  - That's So Raven (reruns)

New series:

- ABC Kids
  - **Power Rangers Jungle Fury**

Not returning from 2006–07:

- ABC Kids
  - Power Rangers Mystic Force

=== CBS ===
Returning series:

- As the World Turns
- The Bold and the Beautiful
- The Early Show
- CBS Evening News
- CBS Morning News
- CBS News Sunday Morning
- Face the Nation
- Guiding Light
- The Price is Right
- The Saturday Early Show
- The Young and the Restless
- KEWLopolis
  - Cake
  - Horseland
  - Sabrina: The Animated Series
  - Trollz

New series:

- KEWLopolis
  - **Care Bears: Adventures in Care-a-lot**
  - **Dino Squad**
  - **Strawberry Shortcake**
  - **Sushi Pack**

Not returning from 2006–07:

- KOL Secret Slumber Party
  - Dance Revolution
  - Madeline

=== NBC ===
Returning series:

- Days of Our Lives
- Early Today
- Meet the Press
- NBC Nightly News with Brian Williams
- Today with Matt Lauer and Meredith Vieira
- Qubo
  - 3-2-1 Penguins!
  - Babar
  - Dragon
  - Jacob Two-Two
  - Jane and the Dragon
  - VeggieTales

New series:

- Qubo
  - **My Friend Rabbit**
  - **Postman Pat**
  - **The Zula Patrol**

Not returning from 2006–07:

- Passions (moved to The 101)

=== Fox ===
Returning series:

- 4Kids TV
  - Chaotic
  - Di-Gata Defenders
  - Kirby: Right Back at Ya!
  - Sonic X
  - Teenage Mutant Ninja Turtles
  - Winx Club
  - Viva Piñata
  - Yu-Gi-Oh! GX
- Fox News Sunday
- Fox Sports
  - This Week in Baseball

New series:

- 4Kids TV
  - **The Adrenaline Project**
  - **Biker Mice from Mars**
  - **Dinosaur King**

Not returning from 2006–07:

- 4Kids TV
  - Bratz
  - G.I. Joe: Sigma 6
  - Yu-Gi-Oh! Capsule Monsters

=== The CW ===
Returning series:

- All of Us (reruns)
- Everybody Hates Chris (reruns)
- Girlfriends (reruns)
- One Tree Hill (reruns)
- Reba (reruns)
- What I Like About You (reruns)
- Kids WB! (The WB)
  - The Batman
  - Johnny Test
  - Legion of Super Heroes
  - Shaggy & Scooby-Doo Get a Clue!
  - Teen Titans
  - Tom and Jerry Tales

New series:

- **Gossip Girl** (reruns)
- **The CW4Kids**
  - Chaotic
  - **Eon Kid**
  - **Magi-Nation**
  - **Skunk Fu!**
  - **The Spectacular Spider-Man**
  - Teenage Mutant Ninja Turtles
  - **Will & Dewitt**
  - **World of Quest**
  - Yu-Gi-Oh! GX

Not returning from 2006–07:

- Kids WB! (The WB)
  - Krypto the Superdog
  - Monster Allergy
  - Loonatics Unleashed
  - Spider Riders
  - Xiaolin Showdown

== See also ==
- 2007–08 United States network television schedule (prime-time)
- 2007–08 United States network television schedule (late night)

== Sources ==
- Curt Alliaume. "ABC Daytime Schedule". Curt Alliaume’s Utterly Irrelevant Web Site. Archived from the original on October 15, 2007.
- Curt Alliaume. "CBS Daytime Schedule". Curt Alliaume’s Utterly Irrelevant Web Site. Archived from the original on October 15, 2007.
- Curt Alliaume. "NBC Daytime Schedule". Curt Alliaume’s Utterly Irrelevant Web Site. Archived from the original on October 12, 2007.
