= Queen Athena =

Queen Athena may refer to:

- Athena (The Little Mermaid), character in the Disney franchise, mother to the protagonist, Ariel
- Queen Athena (Loonatics), character in the Warner Bros. animated TV spin-off series, Loonatics Unleashed
