= Speedy Gonzales =

Warner Bros. theatrical cartoon character

- Looney Tunes/Merrie Melodies character
- First appearance: Cat-Tails for Two (August 29, 1953; 73 years ago) (preliminary version); Speedy Gonzales (September 17, 1955; 71 years ago) (official version)
- Created by: Robert McKimson; Friz Freleng
- Voiced by: Mel Blanc (1953–1989); Noel Blanc (1990, 2012); Jeff Bergman (1990, 2002); Joe Alaskey (1991–2008); Greg Burson (1994–1995, 1998); Eric Goldberg (2003); Billy West (2003); Bob Bergen (2006–2008); Fred Armisen (2011–2015); Tim Dadabo (2011, 2014); Eric Bauza (2014–2026); Dino Andrade (2018); Gabriel "Fluffy" Iglesias (2021–present); Raul Ceballos (2023); see below

In-universe information
- Species: Mouse
- Gender: Male
- Family: Slowpoke Rodriguez (cousin)
- Nationality: Mexican

Speedy Gonzales is a cartoon character in the Warner Bros. Looney Tunes and Merrie Melodies series of cartoons. He is portrayed as "The Fastest Mouse in all Mexico" with his major traits being the ability to run extremely fast, being quick-witted, heroic, and speaking with a Mexican Spanish accent. He usually wears a yellow sombrero, white shirt and trousers (which was a common traditional outfit worn by men and boys of rural Mexican villages), and a red kerchief, similar to that of some traditional Mexican attires. There are 46 theatrical shorts that feature or star the character.

== History ==
A still of an early version of Speedy Gonzales as appeared in Cat-Tails for Two (animated by Charles McKimson)

Speedy's first appearance was in 1953's Cat-Tails for Two though he appeared largely in name (and super speed) only. It would be two years before Friz Freleng and layout artist Hawley Pratt redesigned the character into his modern incarnation for the 1955 Freleng short of the same name. The cartoon features Sylvester the Cat guarding a cheese factory at the international border between the United States and Mexico from starving Mexican mice. The mice call in the plucky, excessively energetic Speedy (voiced by Mel Blanc) to save them. Amid cries of "¡Ándale! ¡Ándale! ¡Arriba! ¡Arriba! ¡Epe! ¡Epe! ¡Epe! Yeehaw!" (Spanish for "Go on! Go on! Up! Up!", although "Ándale arriba" may have been intended as meaning "hurry up"), Sylvester soon gets his comeuppance. The cartoon won the 1955 Academy Award for Best Short Subject (Cartoons).

Speedy Gonzales in the 1955 short film of the same name

While Speedy's last name was given as Gonzalez in Cat-Tails (on a printed business card shown in the cartoon), it was spelled with an "s" from Speedy Gonzales onward. Today, the earlier spelling is sometimes used.

Freleng and McKimson soon set Sylvester up as Speedy's regular nemesis in a series of cartoons, much in the same way Chuck Jones had paired Wile E. Coyote and the Road Runner in his Road Runner cartoons (and indeed, all four characters ended up competing with each other in the short The Wild Chase). Sylvester (often called "El Gringo Pussygato" by Speedy) is constantly outsmarted and outrun by the mouse, causing the cat to suffer all manner of pain and humiliation from mousetraps to accidentally consuming large amounts of Tabasco hot sauce. Other cartoons pair the mouse with his cousin, Slowpoke Rodriguez, the "slowest Mouse in all Mexico." Slowpoke regularly gets into all sorts of trouble that often require Speedy to save him—but one cat in Mexicali Shmoes says that as if to compensate for his slowness, "he pack a gun!" In the mid 1960s, Speedy's main rival and second nemesis became Daffy Duck, whom Speedy usually referred to as "the loco duck." Speedy has shared victories with Sylvester in "Here Today, Gone Tamale" and "A Message to Gracias" as well as with Daffy Duck in "Snow Excuse", "Fiesta Fiasco" and "Skycraper Caper", furthermore Speedy lost to Sylvester in "Cats and Bruises" and he lost twice to Daffy Duck in "Chilli Corn Corny" and "Mucho Locos", and he sometimes lost alongside his co-stars like in "Road To Andalay" where he lost alongside Sylvester or "Daffy Duck's Fantastic Island" where he lost alongside Daffy.

=== Notable cartoon appearances ===
- Cat-Tails for Two (1953) – Early version
- Speedy Gonzales (1955) – Debut, official, Academy Award-winner, 28th (1955) – Short Subject (Cartoon)
- Tabasco Road (1957), Academy Award-nominated
- Mexicali Shmoes (1959), Academy Award-nominated
- The Pied Piper of Guadalupe (1961), Academy Award-nominated
- A Message to Gracias (1964) – One of the rare Speedy Gonzales cartoons directed by Robert McKimson
- It's Nice to Have a Mouse Around the House (1965) – first appearance with Daffy Duck.
- See Ya Later Gladiator (1968) – final theatrical appearance.

== Reception and controversy ==
Feeling that the character presented an offensive Mexican stereotype, Cartoon Network shelved Speedy's films when it gained exclusive rights to broadcast them in 1999 (as a subsidiary of Time Warner, Cartoon Network is a corporate sibling to Warner Bros.). In an interview with Fox News on March 28, 2002, Cartoon Network spokeswoman Laurie Goldberg commented, "It hasn't been on the air for years because of its ethnic stereotypes."

However, the Hispanic-American rights organization League of United Latin American Citizens called Speedy a cultural icon, and thousands of users registered their support of the character on the hispaniconline.com message boards. Fan campaigns to put Speedy back on the air resulted in the return of the animated shorts to Cartoon Network in 2002.

Speedy Gonzales remained a popular character in Latin America. Many Hispanic people remembered him fondly as a quick-witted, heroic Mexican character who always got the best of his opponents, at a time when such positive depictions of Latin Americans were rare in popular entertainment.

In a March 2021 essay, Los Angeles Times columnist Gustavo Arellano wrote, "I love Speedy so much, I keep a large painting of him in my home office. His kind smile and brown skin takes me back to my childhood — and reminds me of where we as Mexicans exist today."

== Other appearances ==
In 1983, he co-starred with Daffy Duck once again in Daffy Duck's Movie: Fantastic Island. He also made a cameo appearance in the finale sequence of the 1988 film Who Framed Roger Rabbit. He had one appearance in the Tiny Toon Adventures episode segment "The Acme Acres Summer Olympics", as the coach, and serving as the mentor of Lightning Rodriguez. He had a minor role in the 1996 film Space Jam. He made a cameo appearance alongside Porky Pig in the 2003 film Looney Tunes: Back in Action, making fun of his politically incorrect status. At around the same time, he made a non-speaking cameo in an episode of ¡Mucha Lucha! titled "Lucha, Rinse and Repeat".

Volume 4 of the Looney Tunes Golden Collection DVD series, released on November 14, 2006, has an entire disc of Speedy shorts, although some of his other shorts had previously been released on Volumes 1 and 3. Speedy is mentioned in one Duck Dodgers episode, after Cadet sits on Dodgers, prompting him to say, "I knew I should've chosen Speedy Gonzales as a sidekick!"

Speedy Gonzales appears in Bah, Humduck! A Looney Tunes Christmas. He is an employee at the Lucky Duck Superstore for the greedy Daffy Duck where he confuses Daffy with the Feliz Navidad comment.

Speedy Gonzales serves as a supporting character on The Looney Tunes Show. He is seen living with Bugs and Daffy as their "mouse in the wall" and running the pizza parlor Pizzarriba. Speedy is shown to act as Daffy's conscience, which is a far cry from the antagonistic relationship they had in the old days. The episode "Sunday Night Slice" showed that Bugs bought his favorite restaurant, Girardi's, to prevent it from being closed and hired Speedy to help him. When Bugs decides he does not want to own a restaurant anymore, he hands ownership of it to Speedy, who renames it to Pizzarriba. In the episode "Beauty School", Speedy is revealed to be teaching dance classes above the Pizzarriba on Monday nights: Bugs - who has spent the episode being a less-than-willing model for Daffy's hairdressing practice - gets dragged into attending with Porky and is mistaken for a woman, who Speedy becomes besotted with. In "The Black Widow", Speedy Gonzales answers Daffy Duck's call and races to Tacapulco to convince his cousin Sheriff Slowpoke Rodriguez to let Daffy Duck and Porky Pig out of jail.

Speedy Gonzales appeared in the 2015 direct-to-video movie Looney Tunes: Rabbits Run. He is seen as Lola Bunny's landlord.

An elderly Speedy Gonzales was "interviewed" by Al Madrigal for Madrigal's one-hour comedic documentary special Half Like Me.

Speedy Gonzales appeared occasionally in New Looney Tunes, often as the leader of a gang of mice that also includes Hubie and Bertie, Sniffles, and "Minnesota Rats" (originally Minniesoda Fats; an aborted 1970s character revived and fleshed out in this series). He seems to have reverted to his personality from Merrie Melodies.

Speedy Gonzales appeared in the 2021 film Space Jam: A New Legacy. Here, he is picked up alongside Granny from The Matrix part of the Warner Bros. 3000 server-verse and becomes a member of the Tune Squad during their basketball match against the Goon Squad.

Speedy Gonzales appeared in the Bugs Bunny Builders episode "Speedy", where he is a professional soccer player and hired the Looney Builders to fly to Mexico and build a soccer stadium for his soccer game with his four teammates. He also made a cameo in the episode "The Snuffles", where he watches the world premiere of the movie Wonder Rabbit on his laptop in the soccer field.

Speedy Gonzales appeared in the 2026 short film Daffy Season, where he switches the audio of a soccer game on TV to Spanish.

== Inspiration of the character's name ==
Though Speedy Gonzales is purely a fictional character, the name was inspired by Frank Gonzales, an assistant animator who was working at Warner Bros. at the time. These facts were described by another Warner Bros. employee, Martha Goldman Sigall, who was present during the event.

== In other media ==
In 1962, pop singer Pat Boone scored a top-10 hit in the United States with the song "Speedy Gonzales" which featured Mel Blanc samples as Speedy. It was covered by Manolo Muñoz and several other artists.

In 1965, the movie Wild on the Beach included the song "Little Speedy Gonzales" which was written by Stan Ross and Bobby Beverly and performed by The Astronauts.

Speedy Gonzales starred in several video games: Cheese Cat-Astrophe Starring Speedy Gonzales for the Mega Drive/Genesis, Master System, and Game Gear, Speedy Gonzales: Los Gatos Bandidos for the Super Nintendo Entertainment System, Speedy Gonzales for the Game Boy and Speedy Gonzales: Aztec Adventure for the Game Boy Color. He also appeared as an enemy in Looney Tunes: Back in Action, and Looney Tunes: Marvin Strikes Back! as both a miniboss and playable character. Between 2008 and 2009, Deadline Games pitched a video game based on Speedy, but it was never developed.

In 2006, Volkswagen licensed Speedy Gonzales for a series of Spanish-language commercials for the Volkswagen Golf, using footage from the cartoon of the same name. Other commercials featuring Speedy were animated by Sahin Ersoz at Hahn Film AG.

In 2010, Virgin Media struck a deal with Warner Bros. to use Speedy in a television advertising campaign promote its superfast broadband services. The campaign was developed by DDB, directed by Dan Colley, Jerry Hibbert, and Guy Bradbury; and produced by Chris Lapham and Aaron McGuirk.

In the 2026 film Coyote vs. Acme Speedy Gonzales is indirectly referenced (but not seen) twice: 1. While lawyer Kevin Avery (Will Forte) is watching television news, an upcoming story teaser says that "A mouse has broken the sound barrier in Guadalajara". 2. Kevin Avery also cites a fictitious in-universe legal case "Sylvester vs. Gonzales", which held a "predator chasing prey is a legal occupation under the law". "Sylvester" refers to Sylvester the Cat, while "Gonzales" refers to Speedy Gonzales.

== Film adaptation ==
In 2010, Warner Bros. Pictures and New Line Cinema announced a new Speedy Gonzales live action/animated feature film. George Lopez was attached to voice the character. In December 2015, it was reported that an animated feature film based on the character was in development at Warner Bros. In April 2016, it was announced that Eugenio Derbez would voice the character. In April 2024, during an interview, Derbez said that he doubted that the movie would happen, saying, "I feel that the studios are afraid that, nowadays, it's so politically incorrect. I've been telling them constantly that we love Speedy Gonzales in Mexico". On December 2, 2025, Jorge R. Gutiérrez teased that a Speedy Gonzales feature film was in development. On January 16, 2026, The Hollywood Reporter announced that the project got greenlit by Warner Bros. Pictures Animation.

== Voice actors ==
- Mel Blanc (1953–1989)
- Malcolm McNeill (Spin a Magic Tune)
- Stan Freberg ("Day-O (The Banana Boat Song)" in Blue Peter)
- Noel Blanc (You Rang? answering machine messages, Bugs Bunny's Birthday Ball, MetLife commercial)
- Jeff Bergman (Tyson Foods commercial, Toon Biography: Speedy Gonzales)
- Joe Alaskey (Tiny Toon Adventures, Looney Tunes River Ride, Yosemite Sam and the Gold River Adventure!, Sunsoft commercial, Bugs Bunny Learning Adventures, The Looney Tunes Kwazy Christmas, Mice Capades, Looney Tunes: Cartoon Conductor)
- Greg Burson (Acme Animation Factory, Speedy Gonzales: Los Gatos Bandidos, Bugs Bunny's Learning Adventures, Quest for Camelot promotion)
- Keith Scott (Canon commercials, The Looney Tunes Radio Show, Looney Rock)
- Eric Goldberg (Looney Tunes: Back in Action)
- Billy West (Looney Tunes: Back in Action – The Video Game)
- James Arnold Taylor (Drawn Together)
- Seth Green (Robot Chicken)
- Bob Bergen (Bah, Humduck! A Looney Tunes Christmas, A Looney Tunes Sing-A-Long Christmas, Volkswagen commercials)
- Kerry Shale (Virgin Media commercials)
- Fred Armisen (The Looney Tunes Show, Looney Tunes: Rabbits Run)
- Tim Dadabo (singing voice in The Looney Tunes Show, speaking voice in Scooby Doo and Looney Tunes: Cartoon Universe)
- Carlos Alazraqui (Half Like Me)
- Eric Bauza (Looney Tunes Dash, Looney Tunes: World of Mayhem)
- Dino Andrade (New Looney Tunes)
- Gabriel Iglesias (Space Jam: A New Legacy,, Daffy Season)
- Raul Ceballos (Bugs Bunny Builders)

== Works cited ==
- Nericcio, William Anthony (1996). “Autopsy of a Rat: Odd, Sundry Parables of Freddy Lopez, Speedy Gonzales, and Other Chicano/Latino Marionettes Prancing about Our First World Visual Emporium.” Camera Obscura 37 (January 1996): 189–237.
- Nericcio, William Anthony (2007). Tex[t]-Mex: Seductive Hallucinations of the "Mexican" in America. University of Texas Press.
- Schneider, Steve (1990). That's All Folks!: The Art of Warner Bros. Animation. Henry Holt & Co.
- Solomon, Charles (1994). The History of Animation: Enchanted Drawings. Random House Value Publishing.
