= The Looney Tunes Show =

American animated television series

- Genre: Animated sitcom Comedy; Slapstick; Musical; Slice of life
- Created by: Sam Register; Spike Brandt; Tony Cervone
- Based on: Looney Tunes and Merrie Melodies by Warner Bros.
- Developed by: Sam Register; Spike Brandt; Tony Cervone
- Showrunners: Spike Brandt; Tony Cervone
- Voices of: Jeff Bergman; Bob Bergen; Maurice LaMarche; Jim Cummings; Fred Armisen; Kristen Wiig; Jennifer Esposito; Annie Mumolo; Billy West; Rob Paulsen; Jess Harnell; Eric Bauza; Grey DeLisle
- Theme music composer: Cliff Friend and Dave Franklin (adaptation by Andy Sturmer)
- Opening theme: "The Merry-Go-Round Broke Down"
- Ending theme: "What's Up, Doc?" by Carl W. Stalling (instrumental)
- Composer: Andy Sturmer
- Country of origin: United States
- Original language: English
- No. of seasons: 2
- No. of episodes: 52 (list of episodes)

Production
- Executive producer: Sam Register
- Producers: Matt Danner (season 1); Hugh Davidson(season 2); Rachel Ramras (season 2)
- Running time: 22 minutes
- Production company: Warner Bros. Animation

Original release
- Network: Cartoon Network
- Release: May 3, 2011 – August 27, 2013 (Note: An unreleased episode first aired in overseas territories. It did not air in the US until August 31, 2014.)

Related
- Loonatics Unleashed (2005–2007); New Looney Tunes (2015–2020)

The Looney Tunes Show is an American animated sitcom produced by Warner Bros. Animation, developed by Sam Register, Spike Brandt and Tony Cervone, and broadcast on Cartoon Network for two seasons from May 3, 2011, to August 27, 2013. (An episode skipped in the United States was later broadcast on August 31, 2014, after it had been first broadcast overseas in proper sequence.) The series featured characters from the Looney Tunes and Merrie Melodies theatrical cartoon shorts in a sitcom format with Bugs Bunny and Daffy Duck, who live a suburban life together within a neighborhood of fellow cartoon neighbors, dealing with various issues in their own way. Many episodes also include a musical short under the Merrie Melodies name, and the first season also includes computer-animated shorts involving new antics between Wile E. Coyote and the Road Runner.

The series received mixed reviews from critics, who praised the visual style and voice acting, but criticized its deviations from the source material. In later years, the series has gained a cult following.

== Premise ==
The Looney Tunes Show revolves around the lives of Bugs Bunny, who owns a suburban home after inventing carrot peelers that pay him royalties, and Daffy Duck, who is Bugs' roommate, as they deal with different issues and problems that they encounter, some of the time caused by Daffy's rather bad lifestyle. The pair reside within a neighborhood inhabited by a number of notable Looney Tunes characters including Yosemite Sam, Granny, Gossamer, and Speedy Gonzales, with both Bugs and Daffy having girlfriends in the form of Lola Bunny and Tina Russo, and a regular friendship with Porky Pig. Other Looney Tunes characters, like Elmer Fudd, Foghorn Leghorn, and Sylvester and Tweety, have less prominent roles but still partake in stories in their own way.

Unlike other Looney Tunes productions, the series focused less on slapstick and fewer visual gags, in favor of sitcom elements including love triangles, employment and rooming. Episodes often contained at least two stories featuring Bugs and Daffy, and sometimes led by others in the show.

Alongside the main plots of the episode, the story would often include Merrie Melodies – two-to-four-minute music videos showcasing the cast singing brand new original songs. For the first season only, the show also included new computer-animated shorts involving Wile E. Coyote and the Road Runner, and a new spate of antics between them.

== Episodes ==
| Season | Episodes | Originally released | |
| Season | Episodes | First released | Last released |
|---|---|---|---|
| 1 | 26 | May 3, 2011 | February 7, 2012 |
| 2 | 26 | October 2, 2012 | November 8, 2013 |

== Characters ==
=== Main ===
- Bugs Bunny (voiced by Jeff Bergman) lives a life of upper-middle-class suburban leisure, based on income from a popular Carrot Peeler that he invented; instead of an underground burrow from the theatrical shorts, Bugs lives in a well-appointed house, drives a compact car, and provides room and board for Daffy Duck. Although he is typically the voice of reason, he has incorporated the trickster personality on occasion. Despite their contrasting personalities, he has dated Lola Bunny.
- Daffy Duck (voiced by Jeff Bergman) is the best friend and roommate of Bugs Bunny. Although eccentric like Bugs, Daffy is incompetent, loudmouthed, and lazy who takes advantage of several characters especially Porky Pig. He also has a high maintenance streak, as he demands far more from his friends than he deserves and takes high advantage of gullible Porky, his other "best friend". With that said, he does have a kinder side. Daffy speaks more in a deadpan tone of voice than previous versions of the character.
- Porky Pig (voiced by Bob Bergen) is Bugs and Daffy's second best friend. Despite being bright and bookish, Porky has an innocent, naïve quality that Daffy frequently uses to his advantage, tricking Porky into parting with large sums of money or accompanying him in bizarre schemes. Porky originally worked a boring office job as an accountant, but got fired following Bugs' example. Porky started his own catering company afterwards. In "Dear John", Porky was shown to have served on the city council. Towards the end of the series, Porky starts a relationship with Petunia in the end of the Season 2 episode "Here Comes the Pig". In "Best Friends Redux", Daffy meets Porky's young self and ensures that Porky becomes good friends with Bugs and Rodney in their cabin, finally showing Porky an act of kindness.
- Speedy Gonzales (voiced by Fred Armisen) is an extremely fast Mexican mouse who lives with Bugs and Daffy as their "mouse in the wall" and runs a pizza parlor called Pizzarriba. Speedy is one of the brighter, more level-headed characters as he is not afraid to speak his mind (even standing up to Bugs at times, despite living rent free in a mouse hole in Bugs house) and has occasionally shown to act as Daffy's conscience.
- Samuel "Yosemite Sam" Rosenbaum (voiced by Maurice LaMarche) is a quick-tempered cowboy who is one of Bugs and Daffy's neighbors. Sam claims to be a liar, a thief and a cheat, amongst other things, like in the original cartoons, albeit the show portrays him as far less ruthless and more moral and mild-mannered.
- Lola Bunny (voiced by Kristen Wiig) is Bugs Bunny's girlfriend, who has a habit of speaking rapidly, whether anyone else is listening or not, being a bit flighty, and is very silly. When they first meet, Bugs falls in love with her, but after learning how energetic Lola is, Bugs loses interest and often tries to escape her company. Lola develops a huge obsession with Bugs Bunny that Daffy initially finds creepy, but in later episodes Daffy and Lola become friends. Despite her often being impulsive and naive, she’s not completely dumb and does show that emotional intelligence and creative thinking are her biggest strengths.
- Tina Russo (voiced by Jennifer Esposito in Season 1, Annie Mumolo in Season 2) is a new character original to the show. She is a yellow duck and Daffy's girlfriend. Tina works at a copy store called "Copy Place". Tina is another straight character of the show, with a no-nonsense personality. The character was originally called Marisol Mallard in the Laff Riot pilot.

=== Recurring ===
- Tasmanian Devil/Taz/Poochie (voiced by Jim Cummings) is a Tasmanian devil who is Bugs' pet. In this show, Taz is portrayed as walking on four legs like a real Tasmanian devil and his eyes are bloodshot red (later turned back to yellow after Bugs uses a taming trick he learned from Speedy Gonzales). Initially, Bugs believed Taz to be a dog and kept him as a house pet named Poochie much to Daffy's discomfort. Eventually, Bugs learned the truth and tried to return him to his home in Tasmania only to find out that Taz would rather live with him. When Taz is not causing trouble for Daffy, Taz has occasionally tried to eat Sylvester. In the episode "Ridiculous Journey", Taz spoke for the first time in the series and bonded with Sylvester and Tweety while they evaded Blacque Jacques Shellacque.
- Mac (voiced by Rob Paulsen) and Tosh (voiced by Jess Harnell) are two goofy gophers with English accents who run an antique store. They are shown to hate being away from each other.
- Pete Puma (voiced by John Kassir) is a dimwitted puma who is one of Daffy Duck's friends and does various jobs around town.
- Marvin the Martian (voiced by Eric Bauza) is a Martian who is one of Daffy Duck's friends.
- Witch Lezah (voiced by Roz Ryan) is a witch who is Gossamer's mother and lives next door to Bugs Bunny. She is often annoyed by Daffy Duck's antics and is a voice of reason. Witch Lezah is also a hypnotherapist by trade. The character is based on Witch Hazel, with "Lezah" being "Hazel" spelled backwards. Promotional artwork by Jamie Nicholes featured Lezah and Hazel together, with the latter being planned to also appear in the series.
- Gossamer (voiced by Kwesi Boakye) is a large orange furry monster who is Witch Lezah's son. In stark contrast to previous characterizations, Gossamer is portrayed as a timid and kind-hearted young boy with a voice to match.
- Emma "Granny" Webster (voiced by June Foray, Stephanie Courtney as a young adult) is a practical and old fashioned elderly lady who is one of Bugs Bunny's neighbors. Granny is revealed to have been a spy for the Allies in World War II. In "The Grand Old Duck of York", it is revealed that Granny also teaches piano lessons. This series marks the final time Foray provided the voice of Granny before her death in 2017.
- Sylvester and Tweety (voiced by Jeff Bergman) are Granny's pets. Sylvester is a tuxedo cat who is always trying to devour Tweety, but always fails, either due to Tweety outwitting him or Granny catching him and spanking him hard enough to spit Tweety out. Tweety is a cute yellow canary who is frequently targeted by Sylvester. Tweety is revealed to have also been a spy for the Allies in World War II during Granny's youth.
- Foghorn Leghorn (voiced by Jeff Bergman) is an eccentric and rich entrepreneur rooster. Foghorn and Daffy get on very well, and are often involved in various schemes. He has mentored Daffy on various occasions, including a biopic where Daffy portrays him and sees himself as a father figure.
- Pepé Le Pew (voiced by René Auberjonois in Season 1, Jeff Bergman in Season 2) is a French striped skunk. He's the local casanova. In the episode "Members Only", he works as a wedding planner when he planned Bugs and Lola's wedding at the country club.
- Elmer Fudd (voiced by Billy West) who works as the resident TV news anchor and also hosts his own talk show, "Tit for Tat". He is fond of Grilled cheese sandwiches.
- Wile E. Coyote and the Road Runner (Road Runner is voiced by Paul Julian via archive recordings, Wile E. is mute) are shown in short computer-animated segments in Season 1. They also make cameos throughout the show, most notably in "Here Comes the Pig", when Bugs gets lost in the desert, he witnesses the Road Runner and Wile E.'s chases, then asks Wile E. for directions to the highway once he fails. Bugs then decides to use Wile E.'s catapult to get back.

=== Others ===
- Dr. Weisberg (voiced by Garry Marshall) is a physician who Bugs and the other characters often visit. His appearance resembles that of Dr. I.Q. Hi from Duck Dodgers.
- Walter Bunny (voiced by John O'Hurley) is Lola Bunny's father who idolizes Bugs. He then appears when they play in the father son tennis tournament. Like most of the characters, he dislikes Daffy.
- Patricia Bunny (voiced by Grey DeLisle in Season 1, Wendi McLendon-Covey in Season 2) is Lola Bunny's mother.
- Henery Hawk (voiced by Ben Falcone) is a chickenhawk that likes to target chickens.
- Cecil Turtle (voiced by Jim Rash) is an antagonistic turtle who formerly worked as a customer service representative at the Trans-Visitron cable company until he got fired by Daffy. Cecil became a con artist but ended up getting defeated by Bugs and Porky.
- Frank Russo (voiced by Dennis Farina) is Tina Russo's dad.
- Slowpoke Rodriguez (voiced by Hugh Davidson) is Speedy's cousin who is the sheriff of Tacapulco, Mexico.
- Hugo the Abominable Snowman (voiced by John DiMaggio) is a Yeti who lives in Alaska.
- Blacque Jacque Shellacque (voiced by Maurice LaMarche) is a tracker who is the Canadian cousin of Yosemite Sam.
- The Three Bears (voiced by Maurice LaMarche, Grey DeLisle, and John DiMaggio) are a family of bears consisting of Henry Bear (a short, cruel, dyspeptic father bear), Mama Bear (a deadpan mother bear), and Junior Bear (a huge, good-natured, oafish 7-year-old "child" bear). They were based on the story Goldilocks and the Three Bears.
- Beaky Buzzard (voiced by Jim Cummings) is a buzzard that rescues anyone in the desert in a hot air balloon.
- Petunia Pig (voiced by Katy Mixon) is a pig that Porky develops a relationship with starting in "Here Comes the Pig".
- Rodney Rabbit (voiced by Chuck Deezy) is a rabbit who is Bugs Bunny's old childhood best friend since summer camp.

== Production ==
The Looney Tunes Show was originally envisioned as Looney Tunes Laff Riot, a "true-to-the-classics" show emulating the original run of Looney Tunes shorts announced in July 2009 by Warner Bros. Animation. The show was produced and directed by Mauricio Pardo and Matt Danner, the latter of whom also co-wrote the theme song. Other crew members working on the show included Doug Langdale, Bob Camp, Chris Reccardi, Mike Fontanelli, Jim Smith, Lynne Naylor, Eddie Fitzgerald, Jim Gomez, Richard Pursel, Joe Alaskey (Bugs Bunny and Daffy Duck), and Bob Bergen (Porky Pig and Tweety). Ottawa-based artist Jessica Borutski created new character designs for the series. However, Looney Tunes Laff Riot was scrapped because the executives were not impressed, and it was later retooled into the sitcom-inspired The Looney Tunes Show which premiered on May 3, 2011, on Cartoon Network. Borutski's character designs were later retooled for the final series. The Laff Riot pilot would surface on September 4, 2020.

As is standard for most modern animated sitcoms like The Simpsons and Family Guy, the series does not use a laugh track.

The animation was produced by Yearim and Rough Draft Korea, along with Toon City Animation in the first season. The Wile E. Coyote and the Road Runner shorts were produced by Crew972.

=== Cancelation ===
On July 29, 2014, it was announced that the series would not be renewed for a third season.

== Broadcast ==
The Looney Tunes Show premiered in the United States on May 3, 2011, through August 31, 2014, on Cartoon Network. In Australia, the series began airing on 9Go! and Cartoon Network Australia.

The Looney Tunes Show premiered in Africa on Boomerang Africa on May 17, 2011, in France on Boomerang France, in the UK on Boomerang UK and on different Boomerang feeds throughout Europe.

The Looney Tunes Show premiered in Canada on Teletoon on September 5, 2011.

== Home media ==
The Looney Tunes Show has received home video releases for season 1. The season 2 episode "Super Rabbit" was released as part of the Looney Tunes: Parodies Collection on February 4, 2020.

| Season | Title | Episode count | Disc(s) | Release date |
|---|---|---|---|---|
| 1 | 3-Pack Fun: The Looney Tunes Show | 12 | 3 | May 8, 2012 |
| 1 | This three-disc reissue for the first three volumes contained the first twelve episodes from the first season. | | | |
| 1 | There Goes the Neighborhood | 14 | 2 | August 7, 2012 |
| 1 | This two-disc release contained the final fourteen episodes from the first season. | | | |

The first episode was also released on Looney Tunes: Rabbits Run as a special feature.

== Reception ==
=== Contemporary response ===
The Looney Tunes Show initially received mixed reviews from critics, who praised the voice acting and animation, but criticized its lack of ambition and departures from previous Looney Tunes incarnations (including its redesigns and portrayals of the characters, and its lack of slapstick and meta humor).

Common Sense Media gave the series 4 out of 5 stars, saying: "Fun remake of classic toon has a more grown-up feel." Robert Lloyd of the Los Angeles Times wrote that "while it doesn’t improve on the originals […] taken on its own merits, ignoring the cognitive dissonance, the show can be pretty amusing." Reviewing the first volume of season one on DVD, Wired wrote, "The Looney Tunes Show does understand what it is. It's a new series for a new generation, and it doesn't seem overly concerned with the sacred nostalgia of us oldsters. It takes strides to modernize the characters while at the same staying more or less true to their original spirit." Conversely, Brian Lowry of Variety called the first season "a disappointment," and was critical of its "short[age] on sight-gags and action […] despite the odd amusing moment," believing that it "represent[ed] a miscalculation – and a basic misunderstanding of the franchise." Writing for The A.V. Club, Brandon Nowalk wrote, "The Looney Tunes Show is the most off-putting version of Looney Tunes I’ve ever seen. Instead of a universe where anything could happen, here the plots are standard sitcom tropes. […] [the show] exists happily inside the lines."

==== Online response ====
In 2010, CBC News reported that upon revealing the redesigned Looney Tunes characters, some fans "lashed out by posting nasty [online] comments" directed toward animator Jessica Borutski, who was tasked with redesigning the characters for The Looney Tunes Show. Borutski admitted that "it was hard to see such hatred," but defended the redesigns, feeling that "[it is] time for a new generation to meet the characters." Cartoon historian Chris Robinson attributed the response to "a sense of ownership," arguing that "[fans] just really become attached to these things […] It's just so strongly rooted in their childhood that they're unable to separate themselves."

=== Retrospective response ===
Since the show's end, the series has been reevaluated by some commentators online in a more favorable light, with some seeing the show as something akin to Seinfeld. There have also been a substantial amount of YouTube videos dedicated to the show's more surreal and meme-worthy moments. The portrayal of Lola Bunny, the creation of Tina Russo, and their dynamic with Bugs and Daffy have also been praised.

=== Awards and nominations ===
The Looney Tunes Show was nominated for three Primetime Emmy Awards.

| Year | Award | Category | Nominee | Outcome |
|---|---|---|---|---|
| 2011 | Primetime Emmy Award | Outstanding Voice-Over Performance | Bob Bergen: For the voice of Porky Pig; Episode: "Jailbird and Jailbunny" | Nominated |
| 2011 | BTVA People's Choice Voice Acting Award | Best Female Vocal Performance in a Television Series in a Supporting Role | Kristen Wiig: For the voice of Lola Bunny | Won |
| 2011 | BTVA Television Voice Acting Award | Best Female Vocal Performance in a Television Series in a Supporting Role | June Foray: For the voice of Granny | Nominated |
| 2012 | Primetime Emmy Award | Outstanding Voice-Over Performance | Kristen Wiig: For the voice of Lola Bunny; Episode: "Double Date" | Nominated |
| 2013 | BTVA Television Voice Acting Award | Best Female Lead Vocal Performance in a Television Series – Comedy/Musical | Kristen Wiig: For the voice of Lola Bunny | Nominated |
| 2013 | Primetime Emmy Award | Outstanding Voice-Over Performance | Bob Bergen: For the voice of Porky Pig; Episode: "We're in Big Truffle" | Nominated |
| 2013 | BTVA Television Voice Acting Award | Best Male Vocal Performance in a Television Series in a Guest Role – Comedy/Musical | Eric Bauza: For the voice of Marvin the Martian | Won |
| 2013 | BTVA People's Choice Voice Acting Award | Best Male Vocal Performance in a Television Series in a Guest Role – Comedy/Musical | Eric Bauza: For the voice of Marvin the Martian | Won |
| 2013 | BTVA Television Voice Acting Award | Best Female Lead Vocal Performance in a Television Series in a Supporting Role – Comedy/Musical | June Foray: For the voice of Granny | Won |
| 2013 | BTVA Television Voice Acting Award | Best Male Vocal Performance in a Television Series in a Supporting Role – Comedy/Musical | Maurice LaMarche: For the voice of Yosemite Sam | Won |

== Music ==
Two albums compiling songs from the show have been released digitally by WaterTower Music:

- Songs from The Looney Tunes Show, Season One (2012)
- Songs from The Looney Tunes Show, Season Two (2013)

== Feature film ==
A direct-to-video film, titled Looney Tunes: Rabbits Run, was released on August 4, 2015 (though Vudu and Wal-Mart retail outlets released it early on July 7, 2015). The film was produced shortly after production of The Looney Tunes Show ended and retains much of the cast and crew from the series with the exception of Kristen Wiig, who is replaced by series writer Rachel Ramras as the voice of Lola Bunny. The film does not follow the continuity of the series, however.
