= Loonatics Unleashed =

American animated television series

- Genre: Action-adventure; Comedy-drama; Superhero; Post-apocalyptic; Science fiction
- Based on: Looney Tunes created by Warner Bros.
- Developed by: Christian Tremblay; Yvon Tremblay
- Starring: Charlie Schlatter; Jessica DiCicco; Jason Marsden; Rob Paulsen; Kevin Michael Richardson; Candi Milo
- Narrated by: Candi Milo
- Composer: Thomas Chase Jones
- Country of origin: United States
- Original language: English
- No. of seasons: 2
- No. of episodes: 26

Production
- Executive producer: Sander Schwartz
- Producer: Ron Myrick
- Running time: 30 minutes
- Production company: Warner Bros. Animation

Original release
- Network: Kids' WB
- Release: September 17, 2005 – May 5, 2007

Related
- Duck Dodgers; The Looney Tunes Show

Loonatics Unleashed is an American superhero animated television series produced by Warner Bros. Animation that ran on Kids' WB for two seasons from 2005 to 2007. It also aired on Cartoon Network internationally, excluding the US and Japan. The series was based and inspired on the Looney Tunes cartoon characters, with the series described by Warner Bros. as an action comedy. Loonatics Unleashed is meant to be a mixture of the Looney Tunes shorts' irreverent style of humor and a modern action animated series, with the characters designed in a more action cartoon-inspired style.

Unlike previous Looney Tunes-related shows, Loonatics Unleashed has a darker tone and takes place in a post-apocalyptic setting, following multiple minor story arcs. The initial concept designs were met with backlash among fans and there were petitions to have the designs changed, while Sander Schwartz defended the show's direction, saying the classic characters were "sharing DNA" with these new ones, and it was an extension of the franchise. Sam Register, who became WB's executive vice president of creative affairs in 2008, considers the character designs "a reminder of what not to do". This serves as the final series of the Looney Tunes TV franchise to premiere in the 2000s decade. After Loonatics Unleashed ended, the franchise would go on hiatus until the release of The Looney Tunes Show on Cartoon Network, four years later.

== Plot ==
"In the year 2772, a meteor strikes the city-planet of Acmetropolis, knocking it off its axis. This cosmic event releases supernatural forces unleashing a new kind of hero...The Loonatics!"

— Zadavia's opening monologue from season 1.

The events of Loonatics Unleashed occur in the year 2773, the year after a meteor strikes the city planet of Acmetropolis by crashing into one of its oceans, knocking it completely off its original axis. Instead of destroying the planet, the meteor crashes in a waterfront, releasing waves of supernatural energies causing some of the planet's citizens' genetic codes to be severely altered, granting them special abilities and strengths.

A mysterious and powerful woman named Zadavia calls upon six of the affected residents to form a team of superheroes. She becomes their commander, dispatching them for the purpose of combating any and all threats to Acmetropolis and its citizens. The newly formed team is known as the Loonatics, with their base operating out of the 134th floor of a large tower. These characters are the descendants of the classic Looney Tunes characters, according to multiple press releases and official sources. Descendants of other Looney Tunes are unverified, though they can be inferred in certain situations based on names, behaviors, and appearances.

It is later revealed that Zadavia is in fact an alien and had used her powers to knock the meteor slightly off-course, preventing the total destruction of the planet. It is also revealed that a mysterious figure, later revealed to be Zadavia's older brother named Optimatus, caused the meteor to strike Acmetropolis in an attempt to destroy his sister.

In the second season, the show takes on a lighter tone and many more descendants of other Looney Tunes characters are introduced, the majority of which only appear once in the series. The super villain characters from the previous season are rarely mentioned or rarely appear, though a few do remain relevant to the plot of several episodes. Zadavia becomes a less mysterious figure and regularly participates with the Loonatics in their adventures, appearing in-person rather than only through her hologram. Two more aliens from Zadavia's home planet are also introduced, Deuce and Keyboard Man. In the season's finale, the Loonatics are temporarily joined by one of their previous adversaries, and Optimatus is replaced by Deuce as the series arch-villain.

== Main characters ==
- Ace Bunny: Descendant of Bugs Bunny. Before the meteor hit the city, Ace worked as a stunt rabbit in films.
- Lexi Bunny: Descendant of Lola Bunny. Before the meteor hit the city, Lexi was trying out to become a cheerleader at Acmetropolis University.
- Danger Duck: Descendant of Daffy Duck. Before the meteor hit the city, Danger was employed as a pool boy.
- Slam Tasmanian: Descendant of the Tasmanian Devil. Before the meteor hit the city, Slam was a fighter in a ring. Due to the nature of his combat, it is implied that he was a pro wrestler in staged fights.
- Tech E. Coyote: Descendant of Wile E. Coyote. Before the meteor hit the city, Tech was a college student at the Acme Institute; although it was never explicitly stated, it is implied that he was kicked out under the pretense of being "mad" after one of the faculty misused his machine, although in his defense, he had installed the self-destruct button for extra credit.
- Rev Runner: Descendant of Road Runner. Before the meteor hit the city, Rev was a delivery boy and invented things.

== Principal voice cast ==
- Charlie Schlatter – Ace Bunny, Toby the Pizza Boy
- Jessica DiCicco – Lexi Bunny
- Jason Marsden – Danger Duck, Pilot #2, Robo-Amigo, Rupes Oberon
- Candi Milo – Zadavia, Misty Breeze, Queen Granicus, Harriet Runner, Alien Girl, Female Reporter, Mum, Old Lady, Monitor
- Rob Paulsen – Rev Runner, Mr. Leghorn, Pilot #1, Gorlop, Pizza Chef, Policeman, Construction Worker, Computer
- Kevin Michael Richardson – Slam Tasmanian, Tech E. Coyote, Massive, Announcer, Warden Oates

=== Additional voice cast ===
- Charlie Adler – Optimatus, Director
- Joe Alaskey – Sylth Vester, The Royal Tweetums, Melvin the Martian, Stoney the Stone
- Dee Bradley Baker – Otto the Odd, Male Reporter (2)
- Jeff Bennett – Professor Zane, Dr. Fidel Chroniker, Colonel Trench
- Bob Bergen – Pinkster Pig
- Steve Blum – Fuz-Z
- Dan Castellaneta – College Professor
- Michael Clarke Duncan - Massive
- Bootsy Collins – Boötes Belinda
- Jim Cummings, Phil Morris – Additional Voices
- Kaley Cuoco – Paula Hayes / Weather Vane
- Tim Curry – Ringmaster
- Grey DeLisle – Apocazons
- Jeannie Elias – Elegant Woman, Boy
- Bill Farmer – Mr. Leghorn, Sportscaster
- David Faustino – Arthur / Time Skip
- Vivica A. Fox – Black Velvet
- Mark Hamill – Adolpho, Captain
- Florence Henderson – Mallory Mastermind
- Mikey Kelley – Rip Runner
- Tom Kenny – Gunnar the Conqueror
- Maurice LaMarche – Ophiuchus Sam, Ice Cream Vendor, Pierre Le Pew
- Phil LaMarr – Drake Sypher
- Daran Norris – Alien Dad, Ralph Runner
- Khary Payton – General Deuce
- James Arnold Taylor – Bugsy the Bug, Male Reporter (3)
- Simon Templeman – Dr. Dare
- Billy West – Electro J. Fudd, Sagittarius Stomper, Male Reporter (1)
- Serena Williams – Queen Athena

== Production ==
Original character designs under the initial working title of Loonatics originally named from left: Slick, Spaz, Buzz, Duck, Lexi, and Roadster.

Loonatics Unleashed began as a pitch by Christian and Yvon Tremblay, originally titled The Loonatics using reinterpretations of classic Looney Tunes characters. The team presented their pitch to then President of Warner Bros. Animation, Sander Schwartz, who responded favorably to the pitch, and after showing the concept to a focus group of kids was given a formal production commitment. David Janollari, then President of Kids' WB expressed enthusiasm for the series and referred to it as "a great way to take the classic Looney Tunes franchise that has been huge with audiences for decades and bring it into the new millennium".

The Loonatics were first unveiled to the public in February 2005 with a live-action/animated promotional short that featured the characters with early designs and names such as Zadavia being originally named Maxima. The reveal of Loonatics, in particular the characters' more angular and imposing designs, was met with ire throughout the Looney Tunes fandom. A petition demanding a change to the Loonatics designs garnered 85,000 signatures. The petition garnered enough of a response that Warner Bros. Animation issued a statement that the circulated drawings were early preliminary designs that had been since modified with softer, less imposing features. Ace's original planned name of Buzz Bunny was likely changed due to a similarly named character created by Metin Seven as well sharing the name with a sex toy.

In September 2006, The CW presented its lineup for the 2006–07 Saturday Morning schedule with Loonatics Unleashed returning for a second season, with the press release describing the show as a "breakout hit". The show was credited with helping Kids' WB become No.1 in key demographics including boys 6-11 and tweens 9-14 and while Pokémon: Advanced Battle was the number one program overall, Loonatics Unleashed managed to tie for second place against Nickelodeons The Fairly OddParents.

In March 2007, The CW presented its lineup for the 2007–08 Saturday Morning schedule with Loonatics Unleashed no longer among the shows scheduled to air.

== Episodes ==
| Season | Episodes | Originally released | | Season DVD release dates (Region 1) |
| Season | Episodes | First released | Last released | Season DVD release dates (Region 1) |
|---|---|---|---|---|
| 1 | 13 | September 17, 2005 | May 13, 2006 | March 13, 2007 |
| 2 | 13 | September 23, 2006 | May 5, 2007 | August 14, 2007 |

=== Season 1 (2005–06) ===
| No. overall | No. in season | Title | Directed by | Written by | Original release date | Prod. code | K6–11 rating/share |
|---|---|---|---|---|---|---|---|
| 1 | 1 | "Loonatics on Ice" | Dan Fausett | Chris Brown | September 17, 2005 | 257–911 | 3.3 (Note: This episode also received a 3.5 rating and 0.85 million viewers with ages 9–14.) |
The citizens of Acmetropolis are living through a heat wave when temperatures drastically drop and the planet is in the grip of a cold snap. To investigate, Zadavia summons the Loonatics, who discover that a group of space Vikings are responsible for the deep freeze. The Loonatics must stop the threat from making the freeze permanent. They are eventually frozen by the Vikings, but Slam Tasmanian frees them.
| 2 | 2 | "Attack of the Fuzz Balls" | Curt Walstead | Brian Swenlin | September 24, 2005 | 257–912 | 3.4 |
The planet is in the grip of Fuz-Z mania when a little creature becomes one of the most popular pets in Acmetropolis thanks to Professor Zane, who says that he found them shortly after the meteor strike. The pets become so popular that even Lexi gets one for herself. But when an attack occurs involving a mysterious creature, the team learns the truth that the Fuz-Zs are the attackers and are spurred on by eating chocolate, causing them to grow into large, vicious monsters and attack. The Loonatics enact a two-step plan to get the creatures out of Acmetropolis while stopping Professor Zane.
| 3 | 3 | "The Cloak of Black Velvet" | Kenny Thompkins | Mark Hoffmeier and Vinny Montello | October 1, 2005 | 257–913 | 4.1 |
A series of attacks on Acmetropolis is being perpetrated by felons who work in shadows. Zadavia dispatches the Loonatics and find the culprit is Black Velvet, a woman who was forced to live in darkness after her eyesight was nearly obliterated by the shock wave unleashed by the impact of the meteor. She steals the planet's Doppler weather radar system dish to create a device to shroud the entire planet in permanent darkness. Along with this, Tech is kidnapped and brainwashed by Black Velvet to help her complete her task. The remaining Loonatics must rescue their teammate and stop Black Velvet. Meanwhile, Duck is tired of technology and makes a bet with Tech that he cannot go for one week without it.
| 4 | 4 | "Weathering Heights" | Dan Fausett | Christopher Painter | October 8, 2005 | 257–914 | 2.9 |
After Paula Hayes, an up-and-coming weather girl and assistant to current (and mean) weather girl, Misty Breeze, is struck by lightning, she becomes Weathervane, a supervillain with control over all forms of weather. She launches wave after wave of cataclysmic storms and the Loonatics must stop her before Acmetropolis is destroyed.
| 5 | 5 | "Going Underground" | Curt Walstead | Jack Monaco | October 29, 2005 | 257–915 | 2.8 |
Lexi and Duck are out buying lunch when an earthquake occurs that sinks parts of Acmetropolis into the ground. The team finds that an evil genius named Dr. Dare plans to place the entire planet underground through a series of earthquakes with the help of the Jade Serpent Crystal. The Loonatics must stop him and return Acmetropolis to its original form.
| 6 | 6 | "The Comet Cometh" | Kenny Thompkins | Len Uhley | November 5, 2005 | 257–916 | 2.1 |
The citizens of Acmetropolis are celebrating the Loonatics on the one-year anniversary of the meteor strike, when the sky is filled with pieces of rock falling from the stars. An investigation by Tech reveals that another meteor is headed straight for Acmetropolis, only this one is 500 times larger than the one that gave the Loonatics their powers one year prior. As the team prepares for the intercept mission, we learn about each Loonatics' life and what they were doing before the meteor struck: Ace was a martial arts stunt double, Lexi was a student at Acme University trying out for the cheerleading squad, Duck was a pool boy, Slam was a professional wrestler, Tech was a student at the Acme Tech Institute, and Rev was a delivery boy/inventor. When they fail to destroy the meteor, they land on it to plant explosive charges and destroy it from the inside. Though successful, an unknown figure declares that he will destroy Acmetropolis despite two failures of using meteors.
| 7 | 7 | "The World is My Circus" | Dan Fausett | Steven Kriozere | November 12, 2005 | 257–917 | 1.6 |
A popular intergalactic circus featuring unique creatures from across the galaxy comes to Acmetropolis to entertain the citizens. Unbeknownst to many of its inhabitants, the circus contains creatures that are combinations of human DNA and animal DNA and its host, the Ringmaster, is the one behind their existence. When a child disappears and an investigation shows that the last place he was seen was the circus, the Loonatics follow a monkey-chameleon-cheetah hybrid (who is revealed to be Zadavia after falling victim to the Ringmaster) to the circus to see what they can dig up. However, when the team gets to the circus they find that they are on the list to join the Ringmaster's menagerie. The team is transformed by the Ringmaster and begin their quest to get back to normal and shut the Ringmaster down. After returning to their original forms, they learn that Otto, the Ringmaster's assistant, is really the one behind everything. Otto transforms the Ringmaster himself into a hybrid, but the Loonatics defeat him.
| 8 | 8 | "Stop the World, I Want to Get Off" | Curt Walstead | Christopher Painter | November 19, 2005 | 257–918 | N/A |
A new villain named Massive uses his ability to control gravity (having the ability to make objects and people lighter-than-air or massively heavy) to commit several robberies all over Acmetropolis. His goal is to use the robberies to make as much money as he possibly can. Meanwhile, the citizens and the Loonatics are getting ready for the championship game of a futuristic sport known as "basherball" (which resembles the Harry Potter series' game of Quidditch) at the Acmetropolis World Dome. When Massive plots to steal the basherball championship trophy, the Loonatics head to the game to stop Massive's crime spree.
| 9 | 9 | "Sypher" | Kenny Thompkins | Wendell Morris | November 26, 2005 | 257–919 | 2.3/10 |
Drake Sypher possesses the power to absorb the abilities of anyone who touches him, and decides he should be the one person getting the fame and glory of being a superhero. He first steals the abilities of a star "basherball" player and scores the winning shot, then steals Ace and Rev's abilities since the two were in attendance at the game. After Zadavia assigns Lexi as the team leader and sends the Loonatics to stop a dam from bursting, Sypher battles the team and adds Lexi and Slam's powers to his. Duck assigns himself as the team leader while Tech creates suits that give the powerless Loonatics simulations of their powers and make them resistant to Sypher. But in the ensuing confrontation, Sypher steals Tech and Duck's powers, resulting in a completely powerless Loonatics team forced to stop Sypher and get their powers back.
| 10 | 10 | "Time After Time" | Curt Walstead | Steve Cuden | February 11, 2006 | 257–921 | 2.1/8 |
The Loonatics must battle Time Skip, a villain who can control time, and stop him from stealing the Trolbot 9000. However, the Loonatics keep failing while the day resets.
| 11 | 11 | "The Menace of Mastermind" | Dan Fausett | Vinny Montello and Mark Hoffmeier | February 18, 2006 | 257–920 | 2.1/8 |
Mallory Mastermind, formerly Mallory Casey, is a former university classmate of Tech. She breaks out of prison to get revenge on Tech for ruining her attempt to steal knowledge from the university professors. Mastermind breaks into their HQ and turns all their technology against them. Tech and the Loonatics must stop Mastermind from inside their own base.
| 12 | 12 | "Acmegeddon" | Kenny Thompkins | Len Uhley | May 6, 2006 | 257–922 | 2.1/9 |
| 13 | 13 | "Acmegeddon" | Dan Fausett | Story by : Chris Brown; Teleplay by : Len Uhley | May 13, 2006 | 257–923 | 2.5/9 |
Part I: Massive, Mastermind, Sypher and Weathervane are broken out of prison by Optimatus and join forces with him to aid their mysterious benefactor in defeating the Loonatics. Part II: Zadavia explains her history and Optimatus' to the Loonatics. Meanwhile, Optimatus betrays Massive, Mastermind, Sypher, and Weathervane, sending them back to Acmetropolis as he activates a wormhole to suck the city-planet up whole. Now knowing the secret of his past and his relation to Zadavia, the Loonatics head for Optimatus' base of operations to defeat him and his "Optiforce(s)".: Planet Freleng is named after Friz Freleng, who created many of the Looney Tunes characters and directed many of the series' cartoon shorts.

=== Season 2 (2006–07) ===
| No. overall | No. in season | Title | Directed by | Written by | Original release date | Prod. code | K6–11 rating/share |
|---|---|---|---|---|---|---|---|
| 14 | 1 | "Secrets of the Guardian Strike Sword" | Andrew Austin | Stephen Sustarsic | September 23, 2006 | 015 | 1.5/7 |
Ace meets a mysterious young man, Deuce, who saves his life when Ophiuchus Sam attempts to rob an inter-dimensional train. Deuce is not whom he appears to be, however, and Ace learns the true origins of his sword.
| 15 | 2 | "A Creep in the Deep" | Andrew Austin | Len Uhley | September 30, 2006 | 014 | 1.4/7 |
The Loonatics encounter Adolpho, a mutated dolphin who uses psychic abilities to brainwash sea creatures and destroy any human-made object at sea. It is up to the Loonatics to stop Adolpho and his gang of killer dolphins from taking revenge on the "surface-dwellers" at their next target: Acmetropolis.
| 16 | 3 | "I Am Slamacus" | Clint Taylor | Gordon Bressack | October 7, 2006 | 016 | 1.2/7 |
Pierre Le Pew convinces Slam and Duck that Slam can become a champion fighter in his private tournament. However, he fails to tell them that the last match is to the death. It is up to the rest of the Loonatics to save Slam before it is too late.
| 17 | 4 | "The Heir Up There" | Dan Fausett | Charles M. Howell IV and Stephen Sustarsic | November 4, 2006 | 017 | 1.6/8 |
The Loonatics have to transport the Royal Tweetums, the heir to the throne, to his home planet of Blanc to end a war. Little do they know is that they are threatened by a force named Sylth Vester and an unknown figure. Both will stop at nothing to see that the Loonatics do not complete their mission.: Planet Blanc is named after Mel Blanc who voiced acted many of the Looney Tunes Characters.
| 18 | 5 | "The Family Business" | Clint Taylor | Alexx Van Dyne | November 11, 2006 | 019 | 1.2/6 |
After the Loonatics' mission on stopping Toby the pizza boy possessed by a Bio-Tech Brain Parasite device, Rev Runner's family comes to visit when they want Rev to take over the family business. Rev begs Tech to help him make his father proud. Meanwhile, Rev's father shows so much attention to him that his younger brother Rip, the oddball of the family, shows extreme jealousy towards his brother for being the family favorite as well as a superhero. When Rip finds the confiscated Bio-Tech Brain Parasite, it takes control of him and acts on his dark feelings of rage and jealousy towards Rev, and the Loonatics must stop him.
| 19 | 6 | "Cape Duck" | Dan Fausett | Mark Zaslove | November 18, 2006 | 020 | 1.3/6 |
One of Tech's weapons goes haywire causing Duck to take out the Sagittarius Stomper, who vows to get his revenge. The citizens consider Duck as the one who did it which make the others jealous. Meanwhile, Dr. Dare is released from his statue prison after being hit by Tech's invention and steals the Shield of Perseus. When Tech is given credit, he, along with Duck, are made targets by the Stomper, who is somehow able to drop heavy objects on them while still in jail.
| 20 | 7 | "The Hunter" | Andrew Austin | Steve Cuden | February 3, 2007 | 021 | N/A |
During a fight against Massive who has escaped from prison, the Loonatics battle the high-tech hunter named Electro J. Fudd who is hunting Ace. However, Massive is actually a robot decoy and soon Electro becomes a target, along with Duck, to be added to someone's collection.
| 21 | 8 | "It Came From Outer Space" | Clint Taylor | Kevin Hopps | February 10, 2007 | 022 | 1.8/8 |
When Rev and Lexi tamper with Tech's X3000 Automated Weapon System mistaking it for a video game, Melvin the Martian comes to Acmetropolis to destroy it after his spacecraft was hit by a missile from Tech's invention. When Melvin threatens to shrink the planet, Lexi admits she tampered with Tech's invention and Melvin orders that Lexi be handed over to him in 24 hours. The Loonatics must find a way to thwart Melvin before Acmetropolis becomes the only planetary location to be "hard to find on any map".
| 22 | 9 | "Apocalypso" | Andrew Austin | Christopher Painter | February 17, 2007 | 018 | 1.8/9 |
Landing on the island of Apocalypso, the Loonatics find a colony of powerful women called the Apocazons led by Queen Athena. Queen Athena, impressed by Lexi's behavior towards Duck, invites her to join them in a special event. However, not all is as it really seems with the Apocazons.
| 23 | 10 | "In the Pinkster" | Dan Fausett | Stephen Sustarsic | February 24, 2007 | 023 | 2.0/10 |
An old friend of Danger Duck, Officer Pinkster Pig, helps the Loonatics in their fight against gangsters Stoney the Stone and Bugsy the Bug. But ever since he has helped out, things have been going bad for the Loonatics.
| 24 | 11 | "The Music Villain" | Andrew Austin | Mark Zaslove | March 3, 2007 | 024 | 1.6/8 |
During the New Year period, the Loonatics face off against Boötes Belinda, a villain and his band who use rock music to terrorize Acmetropolis. When Zadavia is captured, he orders Tech to build a high-tech guitar for him. Now the Loonatics must save Zadavia and defeat this evil band. It turns out that the band are robots led by Rupes Oberon, a man who wrote a national anthem for Zadavia on Freleng, but was shot down since there already was a national anthem: one that had words. He uses the guitar to steal all of Zadavia's powers.
| 25 | 12 | "Planet Blanc" | Clint Taylor | Stephen Sustarsic | April 28, 2007 | 025 | 1.5/8 |
| 26 | 13 | "Planet Blanc" | Dan Fausett | Steve Cuden | May 5, 2007 | 026 | 1.6/8 |
The Fall of Blanc (Part I): Now that Optimatus is free, he, alongside General Deuce and Rupes Oberon, plan to use the planet Blanc's wormhole generator to take over the universe. Blanc is said to be at the center of the universe, and that every point in the universe can be instantly traveled to with ease from it. The Royal Tweetums contacts the Loonatics for help. It turns out that the Tweetums evaded capture. The Loonatics must find him before Optimatus does, but not without help from an old enemy. In Search of Tweetums (Part II): After receiving a message containing clues on the Tweetums' whereabouts, the Loonatics and Sylth Vester seek out where the Tweetums is. Meanwhile, General Deuce and Optimatus begin their plans to conquer the universe. However, Deuce betrays Optimatus, who joins up with Zadavia and the Loonatics. During the final confrontation between Deuce and Ace, Ace banishes him to another universe. The Loonatics realize they have graduated from merely protecting Acmetropolis, and are now protectors of the entire universe. The team decides to relocate their headquarters to Blanc, which will allow them to instantly reach any trouble-spot anywhere in space.

== Home media ==
Loonatics Unleashed: The Complete First Season
| Set details | Special features | |
| 13 episodes; 2-disc DVD set; 1.33:1 aspect ratio; 271 minutes; English (Dolby Stereo) | Villain Invasion! challenge | |
DVD release dates
| Region 1 | Region 2 | Region 4 |
| March 13, 2007 | N/A | N/A |

Loonatics Unleashed: The Complete Second Season
| Set details | Special features | |
| 13 episodes; 2-disc DVD set; 1.33:1 aspect ratio; 273 minutes; English (Dolby Stereo); Subtitles: English SDH | None | |
DVD release dates
| Region 1 | Region 2 | Region 4 |
| August 14, 2007 | N/A | N/A |

== Reception ==
Loonatics Unleashed received mixed to negative reviews. Joly Herman of Common Sense Media gave the show two stars out of five, saying that the jokes are "no longer very funny" and the characters have "become little more than filler material."

== In other media ==
- In the New Looney Tunes episode "One Carroter in Search of an Artist", Ace Bunny makes a brief appearance. Bugs Bunny attempts to get the artist of the cartoon to fix his appearance. After turning into his original premiere design, he begs the artist to change him into something more current, and he turns into Ace, prompting Bugs to state, "Okay, now you're just messing with me".
- In the Teen Titans Go! episode "Huggbees", when danger is reported to be located at the Warner Bros. studio, Raven asks if someone is rebooting the series, followed by a poster of the series accompanied by a stock scream. Another episode called "Unleashed" was more focused on the series with the Titans having to replace the Loonatics after they are killed off by a giant meteor strike.
- Lexi Bunny, Slam Tasmanian, Danger Duck, and Ace Bunny appear in the Animaniacs reboot episode "Suffragette City". Dot refers to them as "whatever these guys are".
