= Cat-Tails for Two =

1953 film by Robert McKimson

- Title card
- Directed by: Robert McKimson
- Story by: Tedd Pierce
- Starring: Mel Blanc; Stan Freberg
- Music by: Carl Stalling
- Animation by: Herman Cohen; Phil DeLara; Charles McKimson; Rod Scribner; Keith Darling; Harry Love
- Layouts by: Robert Givens
- Backgrounds by: Richard H. Thomas
- Color process: Technicolor
- Production company: Warner Bros. Cartoons
- Distributed by: Warner Bros. Pictures
- Release date: August 29, 1953
- Running time: 6:40
- Language: English

Cat-Tails for Two is a 1953 Warner Bros. Merrie Melodies cartoon, directed by Robert McKimson and written by Tedd Pierce. The short was released on August 29, 1953. It was the first appearance of Speedy Gonzales, in a prototype form. Because this cartoon's rendition of Speedy Gonzales looked rather coarse, they redesigned him for future cartoon releases.

== Plot ==
Early prototype of Speedy Gonzales before redesign

George and Benny, two dim-witted cats, are searching for food on a pier when they discover a Mexican ship. Hoping for Mexican mice, they board the ship and encounter Speedy Gonzales, who declares himself "The Fastest Mouse in All Mexico."

George and Benny, the latter who looks like Dodsworth but with red hair, go through numerous attempts to capture Speedy, who always outwits them. Speedy comes to think of them as private entertainment, at one point declaring "I like those fellows. All the time having fon (fun)!" The cats' failures include setting a crate of anvils as a trap, trying to use dynamite-laced cheese without a match, and using a pipe and mallet setup.

In their final attempt, the cats try to channel dynamite through a pipe into Speedy's hiding place, but Speedy bends the pipe back toward them. George's lit dynamite results in an explosion that sends both cats flying into the harbor. As they fall, George admits he has lost his appetite for Mexican food, while Speedy remarks on their silliness.

== Voice cast ==
- Mel Blanc as Speedy Gonzales / George / Benny (screaming)
- Stan Freberg as Benny

== Reception ==
The cartoon has been criticized for its stereotypical and insensitive depictions of Mexicans.

== Home media ==
Cat-Tails for Two is available on disc 3 of the Looney Tunes Golden Collection: Volume 4 DVD set and disc 2 of the Looney Tunes Collector's Vault: Volume 1 Blu-ray set.
