= Lola Bunny =

Warner Bros. theatrical cartoon character

- Looney Tunes character
- Lola Bunny as she appears in Space Jam
- First appearance: Space Jam (1996)
- Created by: Dan Romanelli; Leo Benvenuti; Steve Rudnick; Timothy Harris; Herschel Weingrod
- Voiced by: Kath Soucie (1996–present); Britt McKillip (Baby Looney Tunes; 2002–2005); Kristen Wiig (The Looney Tunes Show; 2011–2014); Rachel Ramras (2014–2015); Carla Delaney (Daffy Duck Dance Off; 2016); Zendaya (Space Jam: A New Legacy; 2021); Chandni Parekh (2022–2025); Kari Wahlgren (Tiny Toons Looniversity; 2023); Erin Yvette (MultiVersus; 2025); Jeannie Tirado (Daffy Season; 2026)
- Developed by: Dan Haskett; Spike Brandt and Tony Cervone; Bob M. Guthrie; San Wei Chan; Ashanti Miller

In-universe information
- Nicknames: Lo (by Bugs Bunny in "Buggin'"); Girl Bunny (by Bill Murray in Space Jam)
- Species: Rabbit/Hare
- Gender: Female
- Significant other: Bugs Bunny (boyfriend)
- Relatives: Walter and Patricia Bunny (parents in The Looney Tunes Show); Lexi Bunny (descendent)

Lola Bunny is a Looney Tunes cartoon character portrayed as an anthropomorphic female rabbit created by Warner Bros. Pictures. She is generally depicted as Bugs Bunny's girlfriend. She first appeared in the 1996 film Space Jam.

== Development ==
=== Honey Bunny ===
A character named "Honey Bunny" first appeared in the Bugs Bunny's Album comic book in 1953. That character was depicted as Bugs' cousin, and was an explorer. The name was reused for a separate character intended as Bugs' love interest, who debuted in Bugs Bunny Comic Book number 108 on November 15, 1966. Robert McKimson designed the prototype version of the character with Phil DeLara redesigning Honey and using her as a semi-regular in the Looney Tunes Gold Key Comics in the 1960s.

Honey's physical appearance varied over time. She was originally drawn with flopped-down ears, white bangs and pale yellow-tan fur. A female rabbit resembling this design appears at the end of the 1979 television special Bugs Bunny's Thanksgiving Diet albeit with the ears standing up. Later merchandise using the character depicted her as more closely resembling Bugs, with grey fur but a more visibly feminine model and clothing, which was used until the early 1990s. She also made several video game cameos such as The Bugs Bunny Crazy Castle, Bugs Bunny's Birthday Ball, and The Bugs Bunny Crazy Castle 2. Honey was also mentioned in the book Looney Tunes: The Ultimate Visual Guide.

When Warner Bros. began working on Space Jam in the mid-1990s, there were plans to feature Honey Bunny in her Bugs-like design. Some artists commented that Honey looked too much like him cross-dressing, and designed a potential replacement. This later design, named Lola Rabbit, was rejected as McDonald's, who had signed a contract with Warner Bros. to sell Space Jam-themed Happy Meal toys, felt that she looked too young to be paired up with Bugs romantically. The character was then redesigned and renamed to Lola Bunny.

=== Voice actors ===
- Desirée Goyette (shows at Six Flags Astroworld)
- June Foray (shows at Marriott's Great America and Six Flags amusement parks)

== Appearances ==
=== Space Jam films ===
Lola first appeared in the 1996 film Space Jam. She is shown with tan fur, blonde bangs, and wears a cropped white tank top, purple/blue shorts and a matching rubber band on both ears like a ponytail. She wears white gloves on her hands. She has tan feet with three toes. She has light blue eyes and a curvy figure. Lola is voiced by Kath Soucie in the film.

Lola was created to serve as a romantic interest for Bugs. As soon as she appears, Bugs is instantly smitten and several other male characters ogle her. Throughout the film, there is a sub-plot of Bugs attempting to win her affection. Lola reciprocates Bugs' feelings when she is nearly injured by one of the opponents in the basketball game, and Bugs saves her.

According to author Kevin Sandler, Lola's personality is a combination of the Hawksian woman, tomboy, and femme fatale archetypes. She is a straight-talking, no-nonsense woman who is extremely independent and confident. She is both highly athletic and extremely seductive in her behavior. Her catchphrase is "Don't ever call me 'Doll'". As animation director Tony Cervone explained, Lola was originally intended to be more of a "tomboy", but the production team feared that she would appear "too masculine" and chose to emphasize her "feminine attributes" instead. Following Space Jam, Lola has regularly appeared in solo stories in the monthly Looney Tunes comic published by DC Comics.

Lola returned in Space Jam: A New Legacy with an updated character redesign, voiced by Zendaya, although Soucie was initially announced to be reprising the role.

=== The Looney Tunes Show ===
Lola also appears in The Looney Tunes Show, where she is voiced by Kristen Wiig. As opposed to her personality in Space Jam, she is portrayed as an eccentric, scatterbrained, endearing, and cheerful young rabbit who tends to obsess over Bugs, whom she refers to as "Bun-Bun". She is very dedicated to achieving goals, but oftentimes tends to forget what she was doing. Lola is mostly involved in bizarre situations, either created by herself or when accompanied by her friend Daffy.

Bugs nevertheless appears to enjoy having her around, even surprising himself when declaring himself her boyfriend in "Double Date" where she helped Daffy get the courage to ask Tina Russo out on a date. Later in the series, Bugs and Lola are seen in multiple episodes spending time with each other.

Lola's wealthy parents Walter (voiced by John O'Hurley) and Patricia (voiced by Grey DeLisle in season 1, Wendi McLendon-Covey in season 2) appear in the show as well.

Lola is the titular lead character in the straight-to-video spin-off film Looney Tunes: Rabbits Run. In this film, however, here she is voiced by Rachel Ramras but still retains her Looney Tunes Show personality and appearance.

=== Other appearances ===
Lola appears as a news reporter twice, both in the direct-to-video film Tweety's High-Flying Adventure and the games Looney Tunes Racing and Looney Tunes: Space Race. Kath Soucie reprises her voice in both.

A baby version of Lola is one of the main characters in the series Baby Looney Tunes, as well as in its direct-to-video film Baby Looney Tunes' Eggs-traordinary Adventure, where she is like her older counterpart in Space Jam, having tomboyish traits and an affinity for basketball. She is voiced by Britt McKillip.

Lola makes a brief cameo in Looney Tunes: Back in Action, where she appears on a poster for a fictional movie titled "A Hare Is Born", a homage to 1954's A Star Is Born.

In the post-apocalyptic action-comedy Loonatics Unleashed, her descendant Lexi Bunny is one of the main characters.

The series New Looney Tunes portrays Lola as a happy and friendly character but with a more serious personality almost like her original character from her debut. She appears in the segments "Hare to the Throne", "Lola Rider" and "Rhoda Derby". Her appearance is similar to The Looney Tunes Show, although she wears a different outfit. She always shows eccentricity and maintains her carefree attitude but very clever and outwits her opponents similar to Bugs. Her intrepid and adventurous side appears within some episodes, where she performs various sports.

Lola appeared in the preschool series Bugs Bunny Builders, this time being voiced by Chandni Parekh, once again having a different voice. This version gained the most positive reception for her personality and her defying gender stereotypes by working hard on projects with her friends and acting as a true leader for a construction team.

Lola appears in Tiny Toons Looniversity, a reboot of Tiny Toon Adventures, this time voiced by Kari Wahlgren. She is seen with Babs Bunny and the other Tiny Toons together onscreen for the first time; her occupation within Acme Looniversity is implied to be sports coach, as well as other roles such as the head chef.

Lola became a playable character in MultiVersus, and is voiced by Erin Yvette. She was included in the season 5 wave alongside Aquaman before the game was delisted from all digital storefronts and all online functionality ceased.

On March 26, 2026, Fortnite released Lola Bunny skins, with Daffy Duck included. A month later, Bugs Bunny was added to coincide with the April Looney Tunes celebration "Rabbit Season".

Lola appears in the short film Daffy Season, voiced by Jeannie Tirado.

== Voice actresses ==
Since Lola Bunny's first official appearance in 1996, the cartoon character has been voiced by a variety of voice actresses.

For the majority of the Looney Tunes series, Lola's character is voiced by Kath Soucie, an American voice actress. Soucie has voiced Lola in Space Jam (1996), Walkers commercial (UK and Ireland only, 1999), Tweety's High-Flying Adventure (2000), Looney Tunes Racing (2000), Looney Tunes: Space Race (2000), the Looney Tunes webtoons (2001–2005), Looney Tunes Dance Off (2010), New Looney Tunes (2015–2020), Looney Tunes World of Mayhem (2018–2026), and Looney Tunes: Wacky World of Sports (2024).

From 2011 to 2014, American actress, comedian, writer, and producer Kristen Wiig, voiced Lola in The Looney Tunes Show. For her portrayal, Wiig received several nominations including a Primetime Emmy and won the People's Choice Voice Acting Award in 2011.

=== Others ===
- Britt McKillip (Baby Looney Tunes, Baby Looney Tunes' Eggs-traordinary Adventure)
- Jessica DiCicco (as Lexi (descendant of character) in Loonatics Unleashed)
- Rachel Ramras (Scooby Doo & Looney Tunes Cartoon Universe: Adventure, Looney Tunes: Rabbits Run)
- Carla Delaney (Daffy Duck Dance Off)
- Zendaya (ESPN 30 for 30: The Bunny & THE GOAT, Space Jam: A New Legacy)
- Chandni Parekh (Bugs Bunny Builders, Acme Fools, Space Jam: Beyond the Jam)
- Kari Wahlgren (Tiny Toons Looniversity)
- Erin Yvette (MultiVersus)
- Jeannie Tirado (Daffy Season)

== Reception and legacy ==
Since her first appearance, Lola quickly became a fan favorite and an iconic character in the Looney Tunes franchise. She has frequently been regarded as an animated sex symbol. In 2020, she was named the "most attractive cartoon character across the world" based on global search volume per month. Shannon Carlin of Bustle.com praised Lola from Space Jam, calling her "confident" and "talented". Dan Kahan of PopDust.com wrote that Lola was meant to be "ogled, both by in-world characters and viewers".

Lola from The Looney Tunes Show was well received by critics. CBR.com ranked Lola and Bugs No. 2 in their 10 Best Romances From Childhood Cartoons, stating that she is more "lively and vapid" than in Space Jam, and is "pretty cute and funny to watch". IGN.com praised the character, calling her a "crazy but charming character" with Kristen Wiig doing "a phenomenal job". WhatCulture calls Lola more interesting compared to her first appearance, stating that the "Lola of this show is scatter-brained, strange, and incredibly off-putting, making her leagues more interesting and funny as a result." Jonathan North of Rotoscopers.com complimented Lola from the same series, saying that it "brought out Lola's character far better than her debut in Space Jam did."

In 2019, after watching the original Space Jam for the first time, Malcolm D. Lee, the director for Space Jam: A New Legacy, said that he "felt off-guard on how Lola was too sexualized" and decided to turn her into the typical "strong woman" character of modern films, stating: "The original Lola Bunny was not politically correct...It's important to reflect the authenticity of strong, capable female characters." The new personality and look gained controversy, specifically among Twitter (now X), as fans complained her appearance made her less physically appealing.

Author Kevin Sandler has said that Lola Bunny was created as a female merchandising counterpart to Bugs Bunny. However, Lola Bunny is not the only character to see a rise in contemporary popularity, as original Looney Tunes merchandise in general has gained nostalgic value.

== Accolades ==
Kristen Wiig, who portrayed Lola Bunny in The Looney Tunes Show, received several nominations for her work and won the 1 Behind the Voice Actors Award.

Year	Work	Award	Category	Nominee	Results
2011	The Looney Tunes Show	BTVA People's Choice Voice Acting Award	Best Female Vocal Performance in a Television Series in a Supporting Role	Kristen Wiig: For the voice of Lola Bunny	Won
2012	The Looney Tunes Show	Primetime Emmy Award	Outstanding Voice-Over Performance	Kristen Wiig: For the voice of Lola Bunny; Episode: "Double Date"	Nominated
2013	The Looney Tunes Show	BTVA Television Voice Acting Award	Best Female Lead Vocal Performance in a Television Series - Comedy/Musical	Kristen Wiig: For the voice of Lola Bunny	Nominated
2016	Looney Tunes: Rabbits Run	BTVA Television Voice Acting Award	Best Female Vocal Performance in a TV Special/Direct-To-DvD Title Or Short	Rachel Ramras: For the voice of Lola Bunny	Nominated

== Bibliography ==
- Sandler, Kevin (1998). Reading the Rabbit: Explorations in Warner Bros. Animation. Rutgers University Press. ISBN 978-0813525389.
