= List of Zoo episodes =

American drama TV series episodes list

Zoo is an American drama television series based on the 2012 novel of the same name by James Patterson and Michael Ledwidge, the former of who also serves as an executive producer. The series primarily stars James Wolk, Kristen Connolly, Nonso Anozie, Nora Arnezeder and Billy Burke as a group of varied professionals who investigate the mysterious pandemic of violent animals attacks upon humans all over the world. Zoo premiered on June 30, 2015 on CBS.

On October 23, 2017, CBS announced that the series was canceled. During the course of the series, 39 episodes of Zoo aired over three seasons.

== Series overview ==
Season	Episodes	Originally released	
Season	Episodes	First released	Last released
1	13	June 30, 2015	September 15, 2015
2	13	June 28, 2016	September 6, 2016
3	13	June 29, 2017	September 21, 2017

== Episodes ==
=== Season 1 (2015) ===
No. overall	No. in season	Title	Directed by	Written by	Original release date	US viewers (millions)
1	1	"First Blood"	Brad Anderson	Josh Appelbaum, André Nemec, Jeff Pinkner & Scott Rosenberg	June 30, 2015	8.18
In Botswana, the American zoologist Jackson Oz rescues French tourist Chloe Tousignant from a lion attack. She is on her honeymoon alone because her ex-fiancé cheated on her. Jackson's late father Robert was collecting evidence for an upcoming rise of the animals against humanity. At the Los Angeles Zoo, a lion keeper is attacked. Journalist Jamie Campbell is convinced this is caused by new food that was contaminated with pesticides from Reiden Global, a biotechnology company, and starts to investigate together with veterinary pathologist Mitch Morgan. Even ordinary pet cats behave strangely.
2	2	"Fight or Flight"	Michael Katleman	Jeff Pinkner & Scott Rosenberg	July 7, 2015	7.67
Jackson's friend, safari guide Abraham Kenyatta, is attacked and then held captive by a group of lions. He is eventually rescued by Jackson, but there are more victims. Startled by this unusual behavior, Jackson's mother tells him to look for his father's rejected research results in Japan. Jamie and Mitch continue their investigation of strange animal behavior around the world and against Reiden. They also find unusual brain activity and hints of hive-like communication in the zoo lions. A man is led into an ambush by a dog owned by a hotel. Chloe returns to Paris and we learn she works as an intelligence analyst at the DGSE and her ex-fiancé is cheating on her with her sister. She is later approached by Gaspard Alves.
3	3	"The Silence of the Cicadas"	Chris Long	Denitria Harris-Lawrence	July 14, 2015	6.56
Gaspard shows Chloe six men killed by dogs and asks her to help him investigate the strange animal behavior. In Japan, Jackson and Abraham fly to a radioactive island outside Fukushima, where Robert conducted his research. They are the only survivors when their plane crashes after a bat attack. They find horses that Robert had blinded, when they had developed defiant pupils and become violent. Jamie and Mitch travel to New Orleans to show their evidence to Senator Vaughn, head of the Environment Committee, but he turns them away because Reiden is too powerful. Afterwards, Gaspard recruits Mitch in a bar and brings them to Japan, where he also rescues Jackson and Abraham from the island. Everyone is introduced to Mr. Delavenne, who also believes the animal pandemic has started. In Mississippi, Evan Lee Hartley, a death row inmate, escapes when wolves attack the prison.
4	4	"Pack Mentality"	David Grossman	Bryan Oh	July 21, 2015	6.69
On video surveillance of the prison in Mississippi, Hartley appears to be leading the wolf pack. FBI agent Ben Shaffer also investigates. Jamie finds a photo of Hartley together with Robert. Mitch and Abraham try to catch one of the wolves but are caught themselves, by Hartley. They escape when hunters shoot a wolf, and they examine the body in the hotel room for an infection. In Antarctica, a research station is attacked by bats. The researchers released their caged birds, thinking it may appease the bats, but the bats continue blocking the station's solar panels until the scientists freeze to death.
5	5	"Blame It on Leo"	Steven A. Adelson	Jay Faerber	July 28, 2015	7.09
In Alabama, Mitch finds a chemical signature in the bacteria from the wolf, that leads to one of Reiden's chemists, Leo Butler, a name Hartley had written all over his Bible. Jamie hacks into Reiden's database and finds that Butler was blackmailing them to compensate for damages caused by Reiden around the world. Together with Shaffer and Jackson, she finds Leo, who explains Reiden's success is based on the "mother cell", their special vector molecule, which is in all of their products, including human medication, plant herbicides and animal food. However, it has adverse side effects. Leo takes Jamie to retrieve the mother cell, but Shaffer tracks his cell phone GPS signal, and they are intercepted by Hartley. Chloe, Mitch, and Abraham travel to Rio to investigate diurnal bats, which local authorities plan to poison. The bats are attracted by electricity and create a power failure, so the group wants to draw the bats out of the city with a strong electric signal, but are held up by Gustavo Silva and his gang. In Boston, Mitch's daughter, Clementine, is having a seizure. Later, her dog Henry is hit by a car and needs expensive surgery to recover.
6	6	"This Is What It Sounds Like"	David Solomon	Carla Kettner	August 4, 2015	5.95
In Paris, a bear roams through an apartment. In Rio, Silva holds Chloe and Mitch captive. The authorities are busy spreading poison against the bats (which does not work), so Abraham needs to find his friends, using his fists. Silva wants Mitch to solve the bat problem without using the cell phone antenna as bait, otherwise he will kill them, so Mitch builds an ultrasound signal. In Mobile, Alabama, Jackson notices on a photo that Hartley has the same widened pupils as the rogue animals. Hartley makes an optometrist inject a sample of the mother cell into his eye. Jackson, Jamie and Shaffer go after him but find him dead from the procedure. Shaffer steals the mother cell from Jamie, but Jackson catches him after discovering Ben killed the optometrist. In pursuit, Jamie shoots him dead. With the mother cell in possession, the full team of five reassembles at the airport.
7	7	"Sleuths"	Dean White	Denitria Harris-Lawrence	August 11, 2015	6.69
Jamie obtains a fake passport so she can travel after killing Ben. In Paris, the bear caught in an apartment is just one out of a sleuth of four. Chloe's ex-fiancé Jean-Michel Lion is working with the local officials on the case. Jamie infiltrates Reiden's Paris office to hack into their accounting records. She wants to find out if Ben had been paid by Reiden so that she will not need to hide from the police anymore. Mitch examines the captive bear, which apparently fell into hibernation. At first, there are no signs of influence of the mother cell, but when the bear awakens its pupils have widened, and it has developed a thicker skin to deflect needles. Also, the DNA test shows changes with respect to an earlier record. Mitch hypothesizes that the mother cell leads to accelerated evolution, and the mother cell might be able to cure. Chloe, Jean-Michel, Jackson, and Abraham find the missing three bears in an old fortress, where the animals awaken from hibernation and attack. Jean-Michel is injured, but they find the bears' weak spot. Mitch contacts Clayton Burke from Reiden and offers him the mother cell, in exchange for a cure for his daughter Clementine.
8	8	"The Cheese Stands Alone"	Eric Laneuville	Jay Faerber & Scott Rosenberg	August 18, 2015	5.85
A container ship runs aground along the coast of Massachusetts, near an island where Jackson lived as a child. The crew was killed by rats that have been feeding on the cargo of grains treated with Reiden pesticides. Thousands of bloodthirsty rats swim ashore and hide away in an abandoned hotel. The team is sent there to capture a male and female rat to check if the mother cell has accelerated their reproduction rate. Becky, a childhood friend of Jackson's and now sheriff, does not want to evacuate the island, as she believes that there is no rat problem, and she does not want to spoil the tourist season. Abraham catches a male rat which gives birth but cannot nurse its pups. Jackson believes the rats have evolved to a hive organization, and they go after the rat queen. Mitch splits off from the group to visit his daughter and her mother in Boston. In New York, a horse gets out of control and gallops off, crashing the carriage in which it was pulling Brannigan, Ben's FBI boss. Ben's body is discovered, and Brannigan starts to investigate. Mitch visits Burke to obtain the cure for his daughter in exchange for the mother cell, and he sees Delavenne in Reiden's offices.
9	9	"Murmuration"	Michael Katleman	Bryan Oh	August 25, 2015	6.18
In possession of the pills for his daughter, Mitch escapes from the Reiden building without handing over the mother cell and reunites with the group. He thinks he can use the mother cell to develop a cure against the mutations, but they need to find an animal that mutated without having had contact with Reiden's products. They decide Zambian leopards are their best option. Brannigan issues an arrest warrant for Chloe and Jamie. Delavenne is Reiden's head of global security and is ordered by Burke to retrieve the mother cell. Jackson and Chloe visit him to suggest that Reiden admit to having caused the animal mutations, but Delavenne refuses, and in response, Jamie contacts her journalist friend Wilson Dupree. When they meet to hand over the evidence, Brannigan tries to arrest Chloe and Jamie, and they barely escape. Reiden threatens Wilson's newspaper with legal action, so Wilson backs out. Various bird species have learned to communicate with each other and start attacking. Mitch rescues his daughter and her mother from a bird attack, and gives them the medication. Burke orders Delavenne to have the group assassinated.
10	10	"Emotional Contagion"	Christine Moore	Jay Faerber	September 1, 2015	6.02
The FBI has issued a public search for the members of the group. Before going to Zambia, Mitch needs an electroporator to examine the African animals for the mutation. Jackson suggests seeking help from Ray Endicott, an animal rights activist who has a troubled past, and from Abraham in Africa. In Clearwater, Florida, they all break into the zoo, where Mitch steals the device. Ray abducts some of the animals, planning to set them free, but is shot by zoo security, so Mitch has to operate on him. The behavioral change from the mother cell appears to have spread between the different animals while herded together in Ray's truck, making even the predatory animals friendly towards each other but hostile against humans. Ray forces the others to take the animals with them, but they escape on the way to the airport. Chased by police, the group barely makes it to their plane bound for Africa. Chloe is left behind and arrested by Brannigan.
11	11	"Eats, Shoots and Leaves"	Zetna Fuentes	Rebekah F. Smith	September 8, 2015	5.73
The team arrives in Zambia and finds Ray's contacts killed by roaming leopards. At night, the leopards attack their camp and kill Ray. Jackson and Abraham find a den and take a cub, in order to examine its mutation and find a cure for the mother cell. When they are held up by rebels, Jackson is shot during the escape. In Virginia, Brannigan is driving with Chloe when his car is attacked, and he is shot. Chloe is abducted by Gaspard, who insists she reveal where the others are. When she refuses to tell him, he has her sister tortured, so Chloe lies, saying they are in India. Eventually, Delavenne frees Chloe and shoots Gaspard.
12	12	"Wild Things"	John Polson	Carla Kettner	September 8, 2015	5.73
In Washington, Delavenne lets Chloe present her findings at a conference on the altered animal behavior, but the scientists believe the cause is a virus. Later they are approached by Amelia Sage, whose team is also investigating the mutations. Abraham, Mitch, and Jamie drive Jackson to the hospital in Harare, which is being evacuated because animals are attacking. A remaining doctor helps Jackson, and in the meantime they use the hospital's lab to produce the cure with stem cells from the Zambian leopard cub. When attacked, they lose the mother cell. The cure is tested on a dog that Abraham caught, and eventually it works. Soldiers sent by Chloe come to the rescue, but on the flight back, the plane is attacked by birds.
13	13	"That Great Big Hill of Hope"	Michael Katleman	Jeff Pinkner & Scott Rosenberg	September 15, 2015	4.81
Several months have passed since the plane crash: the mutated animals have taken over the streets. While the others believe she is dead, Jamie was rescued by a fisherman who does not speak English, and she is trapped at his house. The others have signed non-disclosure agreements in exchange for immunity for their previous actions, and the government has indemnified Reiden in return for their cooperation to fight the mutation and the animals. Abraham is working as a bodyguard against the animals. Jackson and Chloe are working with Amelia Sage. On his way through town, Jackson is attacked and bitten by a dog. He plans to use mosquitoes to deliver the cure once they have it, but the remaining Zambian leopards were contaminated with Reiden's mutation. Jamie calls Mitch on a satellite phone after she discovers that the fisherman had also rescued the leopard cub from the plane crash and it is alive and healthy. The other four reunite and are on their way to take a boat trip to Jamie, when they encounter a large group of animals.

=== Season 2 (2016) ===
No. overall	No. in season	Title	Directed by	Written by	Original release date	US viewers (millions)
14	1	"The Day of the Beast"	Michael Katleman	Matt Pitts & Melissa Glenn	June 28, 2016	5.14
The group manage to evade the horde of animals and retreat back to Reiden Global. En route, Jackson gets cornered by a tiger, but it fails to pay Jackson any attention. The team manage to find another way into New Brunswick to rescue Jamie. However, by the time they arrive, animals have already overrun the house and killed the owner, while Jamie leaves the cub behind (safely isolated) while she flees into the forests. After the rest of the team are forced to leave Jamie behind, Mitch later discovers that the gene has mutated and the cure is ineffective. The team are given a plane containing a mobile lab by government contact Eleanor, where they will work to find another means to cure the animals before the Noah Objective goes into effect. Jackson discovers that he has the mutated gene; he and Chloe decide to keep this development a secret. The team head off to Patagonia, where a special forces team comes across a human who has mutated into a monster and who kills the team with the exception of Dariela Marzan. She and Jackson's team are able to capture it for Mitch to study.
15	2	"Caraquet"	Michael Katleman	Bryan Oh & Nick Parker	June 28, 2016	5.14
The team discovers that the mutated human was a scientist who worked with Dariela. Mitch also learns that the scientist's brain has mutated to a point where it cannot communicate anymore. While they need the mutant to experiment on him further, a vengeful Dariela kills him. Meanwhile, Jamie decides to head into Caraquet, and message her direction on the roof when her team returns. On her travels, she comes across Logan Jones and they journey to Caraquet together.
16	3	"Collision Point"	Steven A. Adelson	Jay Faerber & Rebekah F. Smith	July 5, 2016	5.05
The team flies to Geneva to speak with Eleanor who wishes to talk to them about the Noah Objective. However, they arrive to find Eleanor dead in her hotel room. They find that she died from an army of ants that emit electricity. The ants cause further attacks across the city, and the team learns that they are heading towards the Large Hadron Collider, where its attack would destroy the city. Mitch and Dariela manage to shut down the collider before the ants can cause any damage. Dariela accidentally swallows one, so Mitch kills the ant with an electric shock to save her. Mitch also learns of Jackson's mutation when ants avoid him. Chloe learns that the Noah Objective will not only kill the affected animals, but will also cause over 2,000,000 human casualties. Meanwhile, Jamie and Logan have found that beavers have created dams large enough to divert rivers, changing the local terrain. As they look for another way into Caraquet, Jamie finds that Logan is carrying a bag of money and learns he is a mercenary who was hired to take the cub but left with the money after his team was killed.
17	4	"The Walls of Jericho"	David Solomon	Matt Pitts & Melissa Glenn	July 12, 2016	4.46
Jamie and Logan burn the money to keep them warm. They later encounter Logan's bosses who demand they return the money. The confrontation leads into the deaths of Logan's bosses by a pack of wolves. Jamie and Logan reunite and arrive outside Caraquet to find the town in flames. Meanwhile, the team arrives in Vancouver to find a sloth that is causing earthquakes, but General Davies of the Noah Objective and his team get their hands on it first. They break into the Reiden building, which is hosting a ball relating to the Noah Objective's mission: to kill the animals with TX gas. The team find a stockpile of the gas. As Jackson and Abraham steal the sloth, Chloe and Dariela distract the guards, causing a gas canister to explode. Dariela escapes to safety, but has no choice but to leave Chloe to the mercy of the gas.
18	5	"The Moon and the Star"	Norman Buckley	Bryan Oh & Nick Parker	July 19, 2016	4.11
The rest of the team find Chloe, who dies soon after. Before her death, Chloe received a message informing her that Jamie is going to Caraquet. However as they set off, the plane falls under the control of Allison Shaw, Mitch's step-mother, who wants the team to help her find what is causing some local crops to fail. As soon as they find the culprit, they continue to Caraquet. Jamie and Logan arrive at a school where the locals are hiding waiting for military aid. However, Jamie and Logan discover that the group had given up waiting and has become a cult-like group, occasionally sacrificing people to a pack of polar bears under the belief that doing so would stop the animals from attacking the school. Jamie is forced to be selected as part of the next sacrifice, but she and Logan manage to turn the tables by breaching the fence into the school, and they are both rescued by the timely arrival of Dariela and Mitch.
19	6	"Sex, Lies and Jellyfish"	Ed Ornelas	Matt Pitts & Jay Faerber	July 26, 2016	4.00
Allison presents the team with a newspaper article from 1895 detailing a similar situation with the animals. To learn more about the cause, which Mitch calls the "ghost gene" that is also affecting Jackson, they set off to a venom dealer in Portugal to get their hands on a rare jellyfish. The dealer agrees to give it to them if they find a venomous spider. When they succeed, the dealer reneges on the deal and the team release the spiders. The dealer denies tipping off General Davies, who has sent a team of soldiers to capture them, but is attacked by the spiders before he can tell them who did. Jackson begins to behave erratically by almost beating a soldier to death. It is later revealed Jackson's father Robert is still alive, and that Davies wants to capture Jackson alive to coerce Robert, who is working on the Noah Objective, to cooperate.
20	7	"Jamie's Got a Gun"	Lee Rose	Melissa Glenn & Rebekah F. Smith	August 2, 2016	4.43
Jackson continues to behave irrationally, digging graves and uttering a riddle ("all good children are growing teeth"). Mitch and Abraham decide to put Jackson into a hypnotic state back to his childhood: Robert's work began to consume him and Mitch, feeling resentful of Robert killing lab animals for his experiments, burns down his lab. It is revealed that the riddle is based on the nucleobase that has isolated the ghost gene. Jackson later remembers that Robert injected him, leading him to believe his father infected him. Meanwhile the rest of the team are in a village in England where the sleep-deprived residents are hiding in a church. They dig up a grave to gather the triple helix, after which Dariela decides to stay behind to escort the locals to a safe zone.
21	8	"Zero Sum"	Anton Cropper	Bryan Oh & Nick Parker	August 9, 2016	3.60
Jackson learns that his mother is missing, so the team fly to Botswana to find her. On the flight there, the plane is taken over by General Davies and his soldiers. The team manages to turn the tables and capture Davies, and Abraham tortures him for information. There, Abraham learns that Robert is still alive, but he decides to withhold this information from Jackson. Jamie, who begins to grow close to Logan, realizes that Logan has sent Davies into the plane and is preparing to parachute out. Feeling betrayed, Jamie fires a tranquilizer dart at him. Logan falls off the plane to an unknown fate.
22	9	"Sins of the Father"	Michael Katleman	Carla Kattner	August 16, 2016	4.01
The team arrives at a Botswanan camp where Jackson learns his mother has the same ghost gene as Jackson, and has turned into a feral state like Kovacs in Patagonia. Jackson is forced to kill her to save Abraham. Meanwhile, to find the origins of the final set of triple helix animal bones, Mitch reluctantly asks for the assistance of Max Morgan, a cryptozoologist and his father, in Helsinki. There, they learn that they need to find a live sabretooth cat (a species thought extinct, but actually inhabiting a Pacific island called Pangaea). Abraham is forced to reveal to Jackson that Robert is alive, and that he (Abraham) was likely responsible for his mother's infection years earlier. An angered Jackson begins to act feral and flees. Meanwhile, Dariela and the English villagers near the safe zone when they are attacked by horses. Dariela notices that the horses are after her in particular and are ignoring the villagers. She lures them away while the villagers make it to safety. She later reunites with the team.
23	10	"Yellow Brick Road"	David Barrett	Matt Pitts & Jay Faerber	August 23, 2016	4.83
Mitch and Abraham track down Jackson's movements in Helsinki, leading them to a hospital, which in turn leads them the address of a Vera Salvon. Meanwhile, Davies' team are also on the hunt for Jackson. A team of Russian diplomats arrive on the plane, who intend to veto the Noah Objective, so long as there are assurances that the team's cure will work. In return, they trace Robert Oz's location in Washington, D.C. Mitch and Abraham return to the plane, where Jackson dropped off Vera, who also has the ghost gene. Afterwards, the team goes to Washington to meet Robert. They arrive only to see one of Davies' soldiers dead and Robert missing. Jackson contacts Davies to turn himself in if he can speak with his father. When Robert does not answer, Davies orders a sniper to kill Jackson, only for Jackson to be saved by Robert.
24	11	"The Contingency"	Leslie Libman	Melissa Glenn & Rebekah F. Smith	August 30, 2016	4.68
Mitch, Jamie, and Allison go to Russia to stop the Noah Objective while Abraham and Dariela search for Jackson, but Jackson returns with an unconscious Robert Oz in tow. Jackson has to be restrained while Abraham and Dariela help Robert recover to help Jackson. In Russia, the Russian embassy is attacked by a rogue gorilla. Robert helps Jackson build an EMP, when Davies threatens to attack. Dariela collapses and Abraham finds out she is pregnant. Jamie and Mitch manage to stop the Gorilla. Jackson and Abraham use the EMP to help protect the aircraft. In Russia, the gorilla attack has changed Russia's vote for the Noah Objective, just as Davies had planned. Robert Oz gives Davies the formula for the TX gas and takes the crew to meet his friends' "Shepherds" on the island of Pangaea.
25	12	"Pangaea"	Gary Fleder	Bryan Oh & Nick Parker	September 6, 2016	4.22
Robert takes Abraham, Dariela and Jackson meet Dr. Nielson on the island of Pangaea. She explains that the Shepherds have been trying to fight the same mutation. With 12 hours to go, Mitch and Jamie try to steal the DNA from the Noah Objective but find out that Logan has beat them to it. The Shepherds reveal a delivery system for the cure when it is done, a flock of birds, but first they need to find the sabertooth cat. Mitch, Jamie and Logan are caught by Davies. In a desperate act, Logan helps Jamie rig the DNA to explode. With no other option, Davies decides to abort the mission. Sgt. Mansdale, equally desperate, kills Davies and orders the mission to continue, then frees Mitch, Jamie and Logan. Abraham and Dariela find a sample of the sabertooth cat's DNA. The full team is assembled with Robert still mistrusting Logan. While formulating the cure, Mitch discovers that the Shepherds are responsible for both curing and causing his daughter Clementine's disease. Despite this revelation, Mitch manages to synthesize a cure in Jackson. With no other choice, Robert sacrifices himself for Jackson to produce enough of the cure to save the world. The birds of Pangaea are released with the cure, but so is the TX gas.
26	13	"Clementine"	Michael Katleman	Bryan Oh & Nick Parker	September 6, 2016	4.22
The team and Logan find the island overrun with hybrid creatures that have killed the scientists. Mitch sacrifices himself to the hybrids to ensure that the electric fence is not breached so that the rest can take off to save Clementine from the effects of the TX gas. The remainder of the team arrives at the safe zone to find Clem's mother and stepfather dead. They cure Clem and learn that the birds from Pangaea have made it to the rest of the world, and the animals are cured. Jackson looks through his father's records and discovers that the cure has also sterilized the human race. 10 years later, humanity is still sterilized and hybrids have made their way onto the mainlands. Abraham and Dariela attend their son's graduation at America's last running elementary school. Abraham comes across a 21-year-old Clementine, who reveals that Mitch is still alive and working on a solution.

=== Season 3 (2017) ===
No. overall	No. in season	Title	Directed by	Written by	Original release date	US viewers (millions)
27	1	"No Place Like Home"	Michael Katleman	Melissa Glenn & Nicole Phillips	June 29, 2017	2.99
Jackson, using a team of lions at his command, is working to help people evacuate from the Pacific Coast hybrid zone. Clementine tries to convince Abraham (now a doctor) and Dariela to help her find her father Mitch before the IADG (International Animal Defense Group) does. Mitch is being held in a mysterious facility in suspended animation via a stasis chamber. Jamie is now a successful author who has been working in secret to find the last of the Shepherds, their supposed leader code-named "the Falcon." Jackson encounters a hybrid rhino creature, which he manages to trap with aid from his girlfriend Tessa, and sends a blood sample to Abraham, who is working to find the cure to human sterility. Mitch is found by the IADG, who break him out of containment, nearly killing him in the process. Logan, now an NYPD detective, stops Jamie after she steals an important hard drive. After devising a plan with Abraham and Dariela, Clementine calls Jamie to get her help finding Mitch. She confronts Abraham at gunpoint and leaves abruptly. After confiscating the hard drive, explosions occur at Logan's NYPD precinct and Jackson's camp, from which a mysterious figure was seen fleeing after examining the new hybrid. While being interviewed by the IADG, Mitch is greeted by someone who claims to be Clementine.
28	2	"Diaspora"	Michael Katleman	Bryan Oh & Nick Parker	July 6, 2017	2.83
Jackson helps his safe zone recover from the bombing while the NYPD does their own investigation. While Jamie helps one Clementine, the other Clementine begins questioning Mitch. Tessa knows Jackson as Dylan Green, as Jackson Oz is being hunted. Abraham and Dariela continue to study the mysterious blood sample from Jackson until a razorback hybrid attacks, drawn by the blood sample that has grown into a fetus. Jackson finds a mysterious device left behind by the stranger. Logan's investigation leads him to Jackson. Clementine asks Mitch about Blue Diaspora. Jamie's Clementine discovers a secret chamber in Jamie's plane containing a caged Mansdale, who Jamie has been torturing for information on the remaining Shepherds. Clementine and Jamie attack the facility. Abraham tries to save the fetus, but it is taken by the razorbacks. Jackson gets a threatening message from the mysterious woman. While trying to escape, Mitch is confronted by both Clementines. He shoots the real one, who proves her identity with a memento from her childhood. The false Clementine is then killed by Jamie. Jackson discovers through Logan that the bomber is Abigail Westbrook, his heretofore unknown biological sister. Abraham and Dariela are visited by soldiers who abduct Issac, along with numerous other children, as part of a protocol initiated by Reiden Global. Clementine is revealed to be pregnant.
29	3	"Ten Years Gone"	Ed Ornelas	Jay Faerber & Shintaro Shimosawa	July 13, 2017	2.98
Abraham and Dariela realize a new executive order has been given that quarantines any children under age 12. Jackson continues the hunt for Abigail. Mitch hears about all the events that have transpired with his team. A man named Jonah, who slept with Dariela, confesses to Abraham that Dariela is responsible for giving him Abraham's research, which Jonah then gave to Reiden Global. Abraham calls Jackson to find another sample of the hybrid. Jamie performs risky brain surgery on Mitch to help his condition. While searching for another hybrid rhino, Jackson, Logan, and Tessa are attacked by a hybrid vulture. Later, Jackson confesses his true identity to Tessa, who leaves him. After trying to rescue Issac, Abraham and Dariela are given another child, who they return to his parents. Abraham and Dariela are apprehended by Leanne Ducovny, the CEO of Reiden Global, who offers Isaac's safe return in exchange for Clementine. With the help of Mansdale, Mitch discovers a bio-drive implanted in his brain. He concludes that, if they remove the drive, his memories would be erased, but he would likely die if they leave it in. Mitch decides to leave the bio-drive in until the sterility crisis is averted. Jackson and Logan continue tracking the hybrid vulture, but encounter Mitch, Jamie, and Clementine in a cabin, surrounded by hybrid vultures.
30	4	"Welcome to the Terra Dome"	Greg Beeman	Gregory Weidman & Geoff Tock	July 20, 2017	2.80
The team manages to escape the vultures to the plane; it is revealed that Jamie is responsible for labeling Robert as the man who doomed humanity, thereby making Jackson a target. They learn that the hybrids were attracted to a mysterious device and, if more were planted over the barrier, they would lure the hybrids and infect the rest of the world within 90 days. Abraham and Dariela return to the plane to offer their support. Clementine later leaves on a personal errand, but Dariela gives her location to Ducovny and she is abducted, just before Abraham objects to the idea. The team arrives in New York, tracing a similar device to the headquarters of Reiden Global, which Jamie, Mitch, and Logan infiltrate. Logan confronts and shoots Abigail, who escapes. Ducovny, revealed to be the Falcon, is murdered and Jamie is arrested, having confessed to killing her. Abraham confirms that samples from the newly evolved hybrids are required to manufacture the cure for human sterility; using the device as bait, they pilot the plane away from the city, luring a swarm of hybrid vultures after them.
31	5	"Drop It Like It's Hot"	Norman Buckley	Melissa Glenn & Nicole Phillips	July 27, 2017	2.69
Using a harpoon, Jackson is able to retrieve a sample from one of the vultures, but Mansdale escapes captivity and hides in a car; to dispose of the hybrids, Jackson plants the device in the same car, dropping it into a volcano and inadvertently killing Mansdale. Back in New York, Jamie states that she did not kill Ducovny, but required Mansdale to testify for her. Mitch and Logan infiltrate the morgue and find a computerized contact lens in Ducovny's eye. After revealing the truth about Abigail to his friends, Jackson arrives in Mexico to search for another hybrid, where he encounters Tessa; they search for the hybrid together, where Jackson reveals that he lost his wife and son Connor in an accident years ago. They arrive at a junkyard, finding a band of criminals holding a telepathic ape hybrid called Abendegos, awaiting collection from another Shepherd codenamed "Mr Duncan". On the plane, Abraham and Dariela discover that Clementine is pregnant, explaining Reiden's interest in her, and Abe believes that her unborn child could be the key to curing sterility; Dariela later confesses to giving her over to Reiden. Elsewhere, Abigail is dragged to safety by hybrid wolves, revealing that she can control them just as Jackson controls the animals.
32	6	"Oz is Oz"	Michael Katleman	Matt Pitts	August 3, 2017	2.60
Mitch rescues Clementine from the auction house and admits his regret in not being around to protect her. Jackson and Tessa escape with Abendegos to the plane. They extract its blood and find that the woolly rhinos, winged hybrids, and Abendegos are related and that there are six new hybrids which are required to end the sterility problem. Tessa leaves after reconciling with Jackson. Back in New York, Jamie is released after she and Logan confirm that it was Abigail who murdered Ducovny. Reiden collapses but, when SWAT raids the facility holding the captured children, it is empty. Abigail is returned to her headquarters, where her fellow Shepherds revive her in another stasis chamber. Shown in flashbacks, Abigail was on Pangaea the day of the Noah Objective, where she is revealed to have been jealous of Robert's approval over Jackson, having created the hybrids only to impress him. The ape hybrid whom she named "Abendegos" has her own DNA. After witnessing Robert sacrifice himself to save Jackson, Abigail took over the Shepherds and saved Mitch from death. In the present, Mitch discovers that he is Mr. Duncan.
33	7	"Wham, Bam, Thank You Sam"	Alex Gayner	Jay Faerber & Shintaro Shimosawa	August 10, 2017	2.44
The Shepherds are revealed to be the children's captors; the team rescues them and Isaac, but Abigail infiltrates the plane and retrieves Abendegos, injuring Clementine in the process. Logan is recruited by IADG agent Henry Garrison to investigate worldwide hybrid activity. Mitch and Jamie go searching for a new hybrid, an invisible snake, and are able to kill it with aid from Max, who was also hunting the creature. On the plane, Abraham confirms Clementine's baby is in danger and needs a blood transfusion from the father, Sam Parker. Clementine is put into the stasis chamber to keep her baby alive. Jamie later confirms that Mitch is Duncan, but Mitch wipes her memory with a tranquilizer dart. Max brings a very large egg aboard the plane. Jackson goes searching for Sam, but he denies knowing Clementine before being shot and killed by Abigail, who then captures Jackson.
34	8	"Stakes on a Plane"	Jet Wilkinson	Gregory Widman & Geoff Tock	August 17, 2017	2.61
Abigail takes Jackson to Copenhagen, Denmark and discovers he can control animals telepathically. Mitch and Max decide to remove the bio-drive from Mitch's head, but a power failure during the procedure leaves Mitch temporarily blind and reboots the bio-drive. A new hybrid on the plane has caused the power failure and must be tracked down and a sample taken. Power malfunctions cause Jamie and Dariela to nearly be sucked out of the tail section, but Abraham saves them while Max helps fix Mitch's blindness. Abraham rigs a beacon to draw out the hybrid, an octopus with fanged tentacles, while Jamie tries to overcome Mitch/Duncan to reboot the plane's power system. Abigail uses the plane's situation to discover the secret of how Jackson can control animals. Elsewhere, Logan discovers the cause of hybrid DNA in Germany and similar causes in Seoul, South Korea and Atlanta, Georgia.
35	9	"The Black Forest"	David Barrett	Bryan Oh & Nick Parker	August 24, 2017	2.42
Jamie reboots the plane's power, but Mitch/Duncan escapes the plane. Dariela takes Isaac off the plane, while Abraham stays to help with the crisis. Logan comes to the plane to deal with the spore problem and they coerce a former Shepherd named Jared to lead them to Abigail by tracking the bio-drive. Mitch/Duncan returns to Abigail, who repairs his bio-drive and introduces him to Sam Parker. Jackson deduces that Abigail can control the hybrids and that she is, in fact, the last hybrid needed to cure sterility. Sam is taken to the plane by Abraham to give a transfusion to Clementine and save the baby, but there are complications. Jamie and Max find Jackson and capture Mitch/Duncan and the device used to control his bio-drive, though Jamie leaves him in his "Duncan" state at gunpoint to control his actions. Jared confronts Abigail, but is killed after fighting with Jackson, who retrieves a spinal sample from Abigail. Logan and his team find the spore nest.
36	10	"Once Upon a Time in the Nest"	Avi Youabian	Jay Faerber & Shintaro Shimosawa	August 31, 2017	2.03
Abigail is brought onto the plane dying and Jackson demands that they save her because he needs to know what her endgame is. Abraham determines that Abigail needs her spinal fluid replaced and the only match is the hybrid samples the team has collected. Jackson approves their use and travels to Seoul to meet up with Logan and collect new samples. Meanwhile Jamie offers Mitch/Duncan a deal - kill Abigail and make it look like an accident and Duncan can have possession of the bio-drive controller. He takes the deal and swaps needles during surgery causing Abraham to inadvertently kill her. Abigail's death triggers an implant in her neck that starts setting off beacons to awaken the hybrid nests. Dariela is offered a job with the IADG coordinating the destruction of hybrid nests when the beacons go off. Back on the plane Jamie reveals she had no intention of giving Duncan possession of the controller. They wrestle over ownership when Max steps in and destroys the controller, returning Mitch. Abigail awakens in the operating room and stabs Abraham, grabs a gun and shoots Jamie, Mitch and Max. She waits in the hangar bay for Jackson to return with the hybrid samples and shoots him as well. Clementine awakes from her tank several months along into her pregnancy.
37	11	"Cradles and Graves"	Jennifer Lynch	Melissa Glenn & Nicole Phillips	September 7, 2017	2.66
Abraham's serum coupled with the healing tank have caused Clem to rapidly progress through her pregnancy to the point that she is now full term. She awakens to find everyone dying from gunshot wounds and releases Sam to help save them. Dariela warns them the recent destruction of the hybrid nest has covered the city in toxic spores; if any of the air gets into the plane, everyone will die. So Clem pressurizes the plane and uses the regeneration liquid from the healing tank to treat everyone's gunshot wounds. Once everyone is stable Jamie informs them that now that the plane is pressurized they only have a few hours of oxygen left and the team must find a way to extend their available oxygen until the toxic spores dissipate. When Clem goes into labour it inspires Mitch and Max to coat the air filters to trap the spores while letting outside oxygen in. Meanwhile Jackson has begun decoding Abigail's dead-man switch. He recognizes the GPS coordinates for a beacon in Tokyo and directs the IADG to cut off its power source. When they attempt to they trigger an explosion that destroys the city. Feeling guilty Jackson calls Tessa and admits defeat, apologizing for not being able to stop Abigail. Tessa instead convinces Jackson to think like his dad and take another look at the encrypted code. When he does, he recognizes part of the code is named after a joke his dad used to tell, allowing Jackson to use the answer as a key and decrypt the code.
38	12	"West Side Story"	Gary Fleder	Gregory Weidman & Geoff Tock	September 14, 2017	2.57
En route to delivering the decrypted code to IADG headquarters in Colorado, Abigail shoots down the plane with an EMP, causing it to crash land in the hybrid zone several miles from the Barrier. Dariela and Tessa lead a team to rescue the others. Overrun with hybrids, Jackson and Sam offer to lead the hybrids away and allow the others to make a run for the Barrier. Sam turns on Jackson, however, bringing him straight to Abigail. He attempts to kill Jackson, only for Jackson to shoot him in the leg and push him down the hill. Abigail reveals that this was her plan all along - Sam is really Connor Oz, Jackson's son that was thought to have died 20 years ago, and now Jackson will be forced to watch him die again, with the hybrids circling his wounded body. Jackson is able to rescue him and bring him to the Barrier. Meanwhile, Mitch is able to shut down all the beacons worldwide by redirecting their power to the beacon in North America. This causes all the hybrids to attack the Barrier in an attempt to get to the other side.
39	13	"The Barrier"	Michael Katleman	Bryan Oh & Nick Parker	September 21, 2017	2.84
Mitch asks the Director of the IADG to evacuate Clem and her baby while he works on getting the last beacon turned off. Jackson recognizes the signal pattern as a mixture of his and Abigail's brainwaves, which makes Mitch think that Jackson can safely move through the sonic barrier protecting the beacon. While Jackson is fighting to get close enough to install an override switch, the hybrids attack the headquarters. Everyone else makes a last stand against the hybrids in an attempt to protect the generator long enough to ensure the override switch can be used. Jackson is able to install the switch and Mitch turns off the beacon, causing all the hybrids to flee. Afterwards, a K9 unit that was killed by a hybrid comes back to life as a hybrid, signalling that hybrids can now convert regular animals into new hybrids. Logan is leading the evacuation of Clem when Abigail attacks the convoy with hybrids, killing Logan and taking the baby. She calls Jackson and offers a trade, the baby for Jackson allowing the hybrids through the Barrier. The team is divided on the issue until Jackson, using the remote control, crashes the jet into the Barrier, saying that the new hybrid threat is a problem for another day.

== Ratings ==
Zoo : U.S. viewers per episode (millions)

Season	Episode number												
Season	1	2	3	4	5	6	7	8	9	10	11	12	13
1	8.18	7.67	6.56	6.69	7.09	5.95	6.69	5.85	6.18	6.02	5.73	5.73	4.81
2	5.14	5.14	5.05	4.46	4.11	4.00	4.43	3.60	4.01	4.83	4.68	4.22	4.22
3	2.99	2.83	2.98	2.80	2.69	2.60	2.44	2.61	2.42	2.03	2.66	2.57	2.84

Audience measurement performed by Nielsen Media Research
