= Michael Bennett (book series) =

Thriller novels by James Patterson

- Step on a Crack, Run For Your Life, Worst Case, Tick Tock, I, Michael Bennett
- Author: James Patterson
- Country: United States
- Language: English
- Genre: Thriller
- Publisher: Little, Brown
- Published: February 6, 2007
- Media type: Print (hardcover, paperback)
- No. of books: 17

Michael Bennett is a series of thriller books by co-writers of James Patterson. It follows Michael Bennett, an Irish American New York City detective, as he solves crimes and raises his ten adopted children.

== Books ==
Michael Bennett series
Title	Year	Notes	NYTB †
Step on a Crack	2007	Michael Bennett must free the celebrities and billionaires held hostage at a First Lady's funeral before it is too late.	#1 February 25, 2007
Run for Your Life	2009	A serial killer called "the Teacher" is killing off Manhattanites who break his idea of courtesy. With Michael Ledwidge	#2 February 22, 2009
Worst Case	2010	Someone is kidnapping the children of wealthy families, but he does not ask for any ransom.	#1 February 21, 2010
Tick Tock	2011	Michael Bennett has to cut into vacation time with his family as a serial killer rips New York apart with a string of horrifying murders.	#1 February 13, 2011
I, Michael Bennett	2012	A South American drug lord terrorizes New York City as Michael Bennett does his best to force this criminal mastermind to stand trial for his crimes.	
Gone	2013	Following his angering of a powerful drug lord, Bennett and his family are in a witness protection program out in the boondocks of California.	
Burn	2014	Bennett investigates a high society dining club suspected of practicing ritual murder and cannibalism.	#2 October 19, 2014
Alert	2015	New York City is reeling from a wave of high-profile assassinations which are only a prelude to a more shocking and widespread terrorist plot.	✓
Bullseye	2016	The U.S. President's life is threatened by a mysterious conspiracy of snipers during an intense international conference in New York.	
Haunted	2017	On vacation, local kids start disappearing and Michael Bennett is asked to investigate.	
Ambush	2018	An anonymous tip about a crime in New York proves to be a set-up that takes down an officer, but not Michael Bennett.	
Blindside	2019	The NYC mayor has a daughter who's missing and in danger. Michael Bennett has a son in prison. They make a deal.	
The Russian	2021	Weeks before NYPD Detective Michael Bennett is to marry his longtime love, Mary Catherine, an assassin announces his presence in the city with a string of grisly murders.	
Shattered	2022	A partner and friend disappears in Washington, D.C.. Michael Bennett goes outside his jurisdiction to investigate.	
Obsessed	2023	A killer is targeting young women in New York City. One of the women is a friend of Michael Bennett's daughter.	
Crosshairs	2024	Michael Bennett teams with a shooting expert to track down a killer.	
Paranoia	2025	Michael Bennett chases a killer who feeds on isolation and Paranoia.	

† Books included in The New York Times Best Seller list, with highest position and first date.
