= Zoo (American TV series) =

American drama television series

- Genre: Drama; Thriller; Science Fiction
- Based on: Zoo by James Patterson and Michael Ledwidge
- Developed by: Josh Appelbaum; André Nemec; Jeff Pinkner; Scott Rosenberg
- Starring: James Wolk; Kristen Connolly; Nonso Anozie; Nora Arnezeder; Billy Burke; Alyssa Diaz; Josh Salatin; Gracie Dzienny
- Theme music composer: John Carpenter
- Composer: Chris Tilton
- Country of origin: United States
- Original language: English
- No. of seasons: 3
- No. of episodes: 39 (list of episodes)

Production
- Executive producers: Jeff Pinkner; Josh Appelbaum; André Nemec; Scott Rosenberg; Michael Katleman; James Mangold; Cathy Konrad; James Patterson; Bill Robinson; Leopoldo Gout; Steve Bowen
- Running time: 39–45 minutes
- Production companies: Midnight Radio; Tree Line Film; James Patterson Entertainment; CBS Television Studios

Original release
- Network: CBS
- Release: June 30, 2015 – September 21, 2017

Zoo is an American drama television series based on the 2012 novel by James Patterson and Michael Ledwidge, the former also serving as an executive producer for the series, which stars James Wolk, Kristen Connolly, Nonso Anozie, Nora Arnezeder and Billy Burke as a group of varied professionals who investigate a mysterious outbreak of violent animal attacks upon humans all over the world. Zoo premiered on June 30, 2015, on CBS. CBS renewed the series for a third season in August 2016, which aired between June 29 and September 21, 2017. On October 23, 2017, CBS announced the series had been cancelled after three seasons.

== Premise ==
Violent animal attacks upon humans are occurring all over the world. Jackson Oz, an American zoologist and his Kenyan friend, Abraham Kenyatta, a safari guide, as well as Jamie Campbell, a Los Angeles reporter, Mitch Morgan, a quirky veterinary pathologist, and a French intelligence agent, Chloe Tousignant, all seek to investigate the mysterious pandemic as the attacks become more coordinated and ferocious.

Season	Episodes	Originally released	
Season	Episodes	First released	Last released
1	13	June 30, 2015	September 15, 2015
2	13	June 28, 2016	September 6, 2016
3	13	June 29, 2017	September 21, 2017

== Cast ==
=== Main ===
- James Wolk as Jackson Oz, a zoologist
- Kristen Connolly as Jamie Campbell, a journalist
- Nonso Anozie as Abraham Kenyatta, a safari guide
- Nora Arnezeder as Chloe Tousignant, a French intelligence investigator (seasons 1–2)
- Billy Burke as Dr. Mitch Morgan, a veterinary pathologist
- Alyssa Diaz as Dariela Marzan (seasons 2–3)
- Josh Salatin as Logan Jones/Edward Collins (seasons 2–3)
- Gracie Dzienny as Clementine Lewis (guest season 2; main season 3)

=== Guest ===
- Brian Tee as Philip Weber
- Tamara Tunie as Brenda Montgomery
- Tamlyn Tomita as Minako Oz
- Jay Paulson as Leo Butler
- James DuMont as Dr. Humbolt Swinney
- Simon Kassianides as Jean-Michel Lion
- Scottie Thompson as Sheriff Rebecca Bowman
- David Jensen as Victor Holman

=== Recurring ===
- Ken Olin as Professor Robert Oz
- Bess Armstrong as Dr. Elizabeth Oz
- Benoit Cransac as Pascal
- Henri Lubatti as Gaspard Alves
- Marcus Hester as Evan Lee Hartley
- Carl Lumbly as Thomas Delavenne
- Geoff Stults as FBI Agent Ben Shaffer
- Madison Wolfe as Young Clementine Lewis (seasons 1–2)
- Anastasia Griffith as Audra Lewis
- Gonzalo Menendez as Gustavo Silva
- Michael Scott as Enzo
- Yvonne Welch as Gabriela Machado
- Steven Culp as Clayton Burke
- Xander Berkeley as Ronnie "Dogstick" Brannigan
- Warren Christie as Ray Endicott
- Jayne Atkinson as Amelia Sage
- April Grace as Eleanor
- Tom Butler as Greg Hopper
- Peter Outerbridge as General Andrew Davies
- Joanne Kelly as Allison Shaw
- Edward Foy as Father Pete Harris
- Robin Thomas as Dr. Max Morgan
- Athena Karkanis as Abigail Westbrook
- Hilary Jardine as Tessa
- Sophina Brown as Leanne Ducovny
- Michael Hogan as Henry Garrison
- Delon de Metz as Sam Parker
- Lee Majdoub as Tad Larson (Season 3)

== Production ==
=== Development ===
In October 2013, it was announced that CBS had given Zoo "a rare pilot production commitment for a pitch originating from sibling CBS TV Studios." In July 2014, the series was given a 13-episode straight-to-series order and added to the network's summer schedule.

The series premiered on June 30, 2015, on CBS. On October 2, 2015, Zoo was renewed by CBS for a second season, which premiered on June 28, 2016. On August 10, 2016, CBS renewed the series for a third season, which premiered on June 29, 2017.

There will not be a season 4 as it was cancelled due to low ratings.

=== Casting ===
James Wolk was the first to be cast, in November 2014, followed later the same month by Nora Arnezeder and Nonso Anozie. The main cast was rounded out in January 2015, with Kristen Connolly and Billy Burke. In February, Geoff Stults was cast in a recurring role for a "multi-episode arc". In March, Carl Lumbly was cast in a recurring role.

In March, 2016, Josh Salatin and Alyssa Diaz were added to the cast as series regulars in the second season. In April, Joanne Kelly was cast in a recurring role.

In December 2016, Gracie Dzienny, who guest-starred in the second-season finale, was promoted to series regular for the third season. In January, 2017, Aleks Paunovic was cast in a recurring role. In February, Athena Karkanis, Hilary Jardine, and Sophina Brown were cast in recurring roles.

=== Filming ===
The series started filming in New Orleans in January 2015. Production for the second season began filming in February 2016 in and around Vancouver, British Columbia, Canada. The third season started filming in mid-January 2017, also in and around Vancouver, British Columbia.

== Broadcast ==
Zoo aired in Australia the day after the U.S. premiere, and was simulcast in Canada. It was also aired in the UK and Ireland on Sky One, and in Israel on Yes Action.

Netflix carried the streaming rights in eight countries with many regions, losing the show in June 2022.

== See also ==
- Uplift (science fiction)
- Genetic engineering in science fiction
- Fiction about viral outbreaks
- Animal feed
- Food industry
- Techno-thriller
- When Animals Attack!
