= The Dangerous Days of Daniel X =

2008 novel by James Patterson

The Dangerous Days of Daniel Xtraterrestrial
- First edition
- Author: James Patterson and Michael Ledwidge
- Language: English
- Genre: Young adult fiction, Science fiction novel
- Publisher: Little, Brown
- Publication date: July 21, 2008
- Publication place: United States
- Media type: Print (Hardcover)
- Pages: 238 pp
- Followed by: Watch the Skies

The Dangerous Days of Daniel X is a novel by James Patterson and co-author Michael Ledwidge, written in the same vein as his Maximum Ride series. Patterson returns to the realm of science fiction in this novel. It was released on July 21, 2008.

== Plot ==
Twelve years after the murder of his parents, fifteen-year-old alien Daniel X has taken up the task of his parents as Defender of Earth. In the sewers of Portland, Oregon, he defeats number 19 on the List of Alien Outlaws on Earth, Orkng Jllfgna, in hopes of working his way up to number 1: The Prayer, the alien who murdered Daniel's parents.

Daniel then leaves to go to Los Angeles in search of number 6 on his List, Ergent Seth. While traveling, he spends a night in the woods, camping with the "friends" he conjured up with his powers: Joe, Willy, Emma, and Dana.

The next day, Daniel arrives in LA. With the help of his "family", which he created, he rents a house.

The next day, Daniel decides to go to school, a first in his life. At the end of the day, he bumps into Phoebe Cook, who is also new to the school.

Daniel decides to search the city for clues about the whereabouts of Seth, and stumbles in upon a child-slave and drug-dealing operation.

The following day after school, Daniel walks Phoebe to his house, which he finds destroyed. Soon after, he is contacted by Seth, who again warns him to leave LA.

The next day, Daniel goes back to school and, so as not to seem too smart, purposely flunks a history test. After the test, Phoebe tells Daniel why she had changed schools. A few months before, Phoebe's sister, Allison, had been abducted without a trace. Daniel suspects it to be the work of Seth and hurries home.

After his house is compromised again, Daniel feels it is unsafe to return, so he goes to spend the night with Phoebe. They plot to go to Malibu the following day to investigate Allison's disappearance.

The next morning, Daniel awakens to find Phoebe missing. He finds Phoebe near the school. He talks to her, and she transforms, revealing herself as Ergent Seth in disguise. Seth deactivates Daniel's powers, shoots him, and drags him into a spaceship. The ship flies away from Earth as Daniel is put into a cell for the duration of the trip. He summons his friends, who begin reconnaissance.

Daniel is taken to the bridge as the ship comes to Alpar Nok, Daniel's home world. It has been taken over by Seth and his henchmen, killing or impoverishing most of the inhabitants. Daniel escapes from a landing party and flees under the wreckage, where the few survivors live. After regaining his strength, Daniel goes after Seth again. During the fight, Daniel turns into a tick and enters Seth's head via his ear. He transforms into an elephant inside Seth's head, killing him instantly.

Daniel leaves Alpar Nok and returns to Earth.

== Characters ==
Daniel X – The main character of the novel. His parents' deaths left him with a list of alien criminals that he is to terminate. His main target is Number 1 on the List, a dreadful alien known as The Prayer. Daniel has the power to create with his mind, but must be focused and calm. In the book Daniel explains, "There's only so much I can create, for a limited period. I have to be really calm, and concentrate like you wouldn't believe. If I'm tired or cranky, forget it—it won't work. Plus there seems to be a mass limit. Or sometimes I seem to run up against a mental block of some kind. One time I tried to create a really cool, flaming red Ferrari, but nothing happened." He can shapeshift and read minds, which makes it easier to terminate all the aliens. He is forced to move from town to town because of some laws he has broken, and he must move to wherever the next alien on the list is living. He doesn't go to school, not until the middle of the book, when he moves to LA. He is very smart, but sometimes he acts dumb, just so he doesn't get made fun of or so that he doesn't gain unwanted attention. Daniel is also quite cocky, however, and doesn't always think things through, usually underestimating an opponent or enemy. Throughout the whole book, he is after Number 6 (Ergent Seth) on the List.

Phoebe Cook – In the middle of the book, Seth impersonates her, pretending to be Daniel's girlfriend, thus earning his trust. But one night, while he sleeps in Phoebe's closet as she is dreaming, Daniel reads her mind. The dream is about Seth in a classroom, trying to figure out a confusing problem, and everyone is calling him "dumb-dumb." In the end of the novel, it is revealed that the real Phoebe Cook was one of the humans taken from Earth, and she and Daniel meet near the end of the story.

Ergent Seth – Seth for short, he's Number 6 on Daniel's List. He is said to be a Vermgypian alien, and is described in the book by Daniel as having "an impossibly narrow, horse-like head, a dead horse's head, covered in slack, bone-white, bloodless skin. The skin was decorated with pea-sized, pus-oozing bumps, like a diseased chicken's." Later, he describes Seth's eyes as "Shiny, bulging, blood-red orbs embedded in the loose skin like larvae." It is also said that Seth has a British accent. He is responsible for many horror movie sequels. Daniel is chasing after this character the entire story, until Seth is killed by Daniel at the end of the book by transforming into an elephant inside his head. He is known to be very cranky.

Dana – Dana is from Daniel's home planet of Alpar Nok. She, along with Joe, Emma, and Willy, were assumed dead when the planet was attacked, although their bodies were never found. She is often conjured out of Daniel's mind to keep him from getting lonely. Dana has long blond hair and fair skin. She is explained by Daniel as "the girl of his dreams." It is proven throughout the book that they have feelings for each other. But in "Armageddon" she shows "feelings" for Willy.

Emma – Emma is from Alpar Nok. She, Joe, Willy, and Dana were a part of Daniel's "drang" (an alien word for a group of close friends, possibly also meaning 'Gang'). She is a self-proclaimed environmentalist, a vegetarian, and an extreme animal lover. She was given the title 'Earth Mother' by the group. She is Willy's younger sister. She is white and has brown hair and brown eyes.

Joe – Joe is from Alpar Nok. He is fairly tall and very skinny (even though he eats four times his own body weight). His mouth is always moving; he is either talking or eating. He is the clown of the drang and is constantly joking. He enjoys playing video games and computers.

Willy – Daniel's wingman. Daniel usually summons Willy for help with machinery, weapons and combat. He never backs down from a challenge and is constantly reminding everyone that there is nothing to fear except fear itself. Willy is Emma's older brother. And has feelings for Dana, per "Armageddon".

Graff - Daniel's father. Killed in prologue of the first book but constantly conjured up by Daniel. His soul dies in "Armageddon".

Altrelda - Daniel's mother. Also killed in the prologue in the first book. Her soul dies in "Armageddon".

Melody Judge - A girl Daniel meets in "Armageddon". She is said to be very beautiful, with 'eyes as blue as the sky, no, bluer, like sapphires'. She is said to be very much like Dana, and at the end of the series, it turns out that they are one and the same. Daughter of Special Agent Martin Judge.

Judy McGillicutty - A waitress that Daniel met looking for his target in the second book

== Sequels ==
After the success of The Dangerous Days of Daniel X, Patterson followed up with several sequels: Watch the Skies (2009), Demons and Druids (2010), Game Over (2011), Armageddon (2012), and Lights Out (2015).

== In other media ==
=== Video game ===
In January 2010, Patterson collaborated with THQ to release a video game based on the world of Daniel X, titled Daniel X: The Ultimate Power. It was released exclusively for the Nintendo DS.

=== Planned film adaptation ===
It was reported in May 2008 that New Regency Productions obtained the rights to The Dangerous Days of Daniel X. The film currently seems to be stuck in development hell.

=== Audio drama ===
In 2022, an audio drama based on the novel titled Daniel X: Genesis was released on Audible starring Michael Cimino as Daniel.

== Notes ==
=== Further reading ===
- The Dangerous Days of Daniel X. Publishers Weekly. 2008;255(34):68. Accessed May 20, 2025. https://search.ebscohost.com/login.aspx?direct=true&db=lkh&AN=35371570&lang=ru&site=eds-live&scope=site
- Klein M. The dangerous days of Daniel X. Kliatt. November 2008:59. Accessed May 20, 2025. https://search.ebscohost.com/login.aspx?direct=true&db=lkh&AN=35376770&lang=ru&site=eds-live&scope=site
- J. D. A. The Dangerous Days of Daniel X. Reading Time. 2009;53(1):34. Accessed May 20, 2025. https://search.ebscohost.com/login.aspx?direct=true&db=f6h&AN=36890906&lang=ru&site=eds-live&scope=site
- Israel JL. The Dangerous Days of Daniel X. Library Journal. 2008;133(15):95. Accessed May 20, 2025. https://search.ebscohost.com/login.aspx?direct=true&db=lkh&AN=34400320&lang=ru&site=eds-live&scope=site
