= Run for Your Life (Patterson and Ledwidge novel) =

2009 novel

- Author: James Patterson; Michael Ledwidge
- Language: English
- Series: Michael Bennett series
- Genre: Thriller
- Publisher: Little, Brown and Company
- Publication date: February 2, 2009
- Publication place: United States
- Media type: Print (hardcover, paperback)
- Pages: 384 pp.
- ISBN: 978-0-316-01874-6
- Preceded by: Step on a Crack (2007)
- Followed by: Worst Case (2010)

Run for Your Life, published in 2009, is the second novel in the Michael Bennett series by the American authors James Patterson and Michael Ledwidge. The novel debuted on the New York Times Best-Seller list at number 2 on February 20, 2009.

== Critical reception ==
James Mitchell of Tonight said that, while he liked the novel, it was "somewhat predictable towards the end".
