= Dark Was the Night (2014 film) =

- Film poster
- Directed by: Jack Heller
- Written by: Tyler Hisel
- Produced by: Jack Heller; Dylan K. Narang; Stefan Nowicki; Dallas Sonnier
- Starring: Kevin Durand; Lukas Haas; Bianca Kajlich; Nick Damici; Sabina Gadecki; Steve Agee; Heath Freeman
- Cinematography: Ryan Samul
- Edited by: Timothy Donovan
- Music by: Darren Morze
- Production companies: Caliber Media Company; Foggy Bottom Pictures; Molecule; Preferred Content; Sundial Pictures
- Distributed by: Image Entertainment
- Release dates: October 16, 2014 (Screamfest Horror Film Festival); July 24, 2015
- Running time: 90 minutes
- Country: United States
- Language: English

Dark Was the Night (released as Monster Hunter in the UK) is a 2014 American horror film directed and produced by Jack Heller, and written by Tyler Hisel. It stars Kevin Durand, Lukas Haas, and Bianca Kajlich.

== Plot ==
At a logging camp, a supervisor tries to contact the last crew working before the weekend. When he cannot, he goes to the site and finds a severed arm and something in the trees. When he flees back to his car, a creature kills him.

90 miles south in Maiden Woods, Farmer Ron insists that one of his horses has been stolen, but there is no evidence or motive for theft. Sheriff Paul Shields and his deputy Donny assume the man forgot to shut his gate and the horse escaped. That night, Paul's son Adam sees something pass their window, but Paul finds nothing outside. Adam asks Paul why his mother doesn't live with them, and alludes to someone named Tim.

The next morning, Paul finds footprints in the snow around his house that appear to come from an animal with hooves that walks on two legs. The footprints are around everybody's houses in Maiden Woods. Paul and Donny follow the footprints into the woods and find claw marks on the trees where the footprints disappear. No known animal with hooves can walk such a distance on two legs, so Paul assumes that the whole thing is a prank. Meanwhile, several local animals have gone missing. Ron's daughter and several hunters confront Paul with fears about old aboriginal stories of creatures living in the woods, though he dismisses this. Earl, another hunter, says that even though it is hunting season, all the deer and other animals have disappeared, meaning a new predator may be in the area.

As Paul drives Adam home, they both see a creature in the back yard. When Paul investigates, all he finds is a bridle up a tree that came from Ron's missing horse. The next day, Paul and Donny witness a flock of birds flying south when they should be flying north. That night, Paul is called to Ron's farm, where he sees the creature attempt to enter the stables before it flees. Paul later discovers a dead deer that had been mauled in the road, but before he can move it, the creature appears and takes the body away.

Susan tells Donny that their second son, Tim, died in a freak accident while Paul was supervising him. Paul blames himself and it is affecting their family. As the town gets increasingly concerned about the creature, resident Jim even taunts Paul with his failure to protect his son. Paul occasionally has visions of Tim while he is investigating the creature.

The next day, three hunters are attacked in the woods. Though one witness survives, he cannot say anything definitive about the creature. The other two bodies are found mangled high up in the trees. Paul bans any more hunters from entering the forest and orders everybody in town to stay indoors at night. He also reports the deaths and calls in park rangers to hunt the creature down. That night, a snow storm hits the surrounding area and most of the town evacuates. Paul theorizes that the creature had been pushed from its territory by the logging company. A hunter shows Paul game camera footage of a creature walking on two legs. As the storm gets worse, the creature breaks into Paul's house, where he barricades himself and Adam in the bathroom until the arrival of Donny scares it away.

Paul gathers the remaining residents into the town church. He reconciles with his wife, and seems to finally forgive himself for the accident with Tim. When the creature arrives, Paul takes the residents into the basement. He and Donny go upstairs to confront the creature and split up; Donny encounters it in the kitchen and shoots it, but is wounded himself, and it escapes. Paul finds it in the main church and, after shooting it, it attacks him. He ultimately kills it with a knife.

Paul returns to the basement with news that the creature is dead. However, while examining the creature's body, Donny realizes that he had shot it in the shoulder, yet the wound was missing. Paul and Donny realize that there is more than one creature in the church. Outside, dozens of creatures swarm over the roof.

== Cast ==
- Kevin Durand as Paul Shields, Sheriff of Maiden Woods County
- Lukas Haas as Deputy Donny Saunders
- Bianca Kajlich as Susan Shields
- Ethan Khusidman as Adam Shields
- Nick Damici as Earl Lerner
- Steve Agee as The Foreman
- Heath Freeman as Jim
- Sabina Gadecki as Clair
- Minerva Scelza as Mrs. Poplar
- Joseph Pallister as The Hunter
- Charles Parshley as Kyle

== Production ==
=== Development ===
Tyler Hisel's screenplay for The Trees (later to become Dark Was the Night) was included in the 2009 Hollywood Black List (the annual list of the top 100 screenplays; not to be confused with this blacklist). The film is loosely based on the real-life events that unfolded in Topsham, England in 1855, known as the Devil's Footprints. The small town woke to find freshly fallen snow and apparent hoof prints tracing the landscape. Dark Was the Night investigates the question of how a present-day community would react to similar event.

There is a point in the film where the Sheriff is investigating creatures with a "three-toed hoof," which they see from its tracks. He briefly pauses over a search engine article about a Wendigo. One of the town residents, who claims to have Shawnee ancestry, tells him that the natives believed in a spirit that dwelled in the trees. In many native cultures, the Wendigo is depicted as a forest dwelling humanoid or evil spirit. The Wendigo is believed to either eat humans or possess humans, causing them to become cannibalistic. It is possible that the legends of this creature inspired its creation, though the final appearance in the film does not closely match any indigenous or popular depiction of the Wendigo.

There is also a reference in the film to the possibility that the creature could be a thought-extinct or never-discovered species that had simply lived undisturbed in the woods for a long time without human contact. Deputy Donny alludes to the case of a fish which was believed extinct for millions of years, possibly a reference to the case of the rediscovery of the coelacanth. In 1938, a coelacanth, believed extinct for 70 million years, was caught near the mouth of the Chalumna river in South Africa. Donny, however, claims it was off the coast of Taiwan, and does not give a species.

=== Filming ===
Jack Heller directed, and the film is said to include a "never-before-seen monster", drawn from various pieces of American folklore.

Production started in February 2012, filming in Southampton, New York.

== Release ==
Dark Was the Night was released in theaters on July 24, 2015, through Image Entertainment.

== Reception ==
On the review aggregator Rotten Tomatoes, the film holds an approval rating of 52% based on 21 critic reviews with an average score of 6.00/10. On Metacritic, it has a score of 40, indicating "mixed and average reviews."
