= Freaky Deaky (film) =

- Directed by: Charles Matthau
- Screenplay by: Charles Matthau
- Based on: Freaky Deaky by Elmore Leonard
- Produced by: Charles Matthau; Judd Rubin
- Starring: Billy Burke; Christian Slater; Michael Jai White; Crispin Glover; Roger Bart; Sabina Gadecki; Andy Dick; Breanne Racano
- Cinematography: John J. Connor
- Edited by: William Steinkamp
- Music by: Joseph LoDuca
- Production companies: The Matthau Company; Final Cut Productions
- Distributed by: Entertainment One
- Release date: April 22, 2012
- Running time: 105 minutes
- Country: United States
- Language: English

Freaky Deaky is a 2012 crime-comedy-thriller film based on Elmore Leonard's 1988 novel of the same name. Produced, directed and written by Charles Matthau, the film starring Billy Burke, Christian Slater, Crispin Glover and Michael Jai White involves a bomb squad detective investigating weird goings-on of two 1960s ex-hippies revolutionaries in 1974 Detroit.

The film was released straight to video after debuting at the Tribeca Film Festival.

== Plot ==
Chris Mankowski worked in the bomb squad, but when he transferred out, he got caught up in an elaborate plot by former hippies, who have turned bomb making into a business.

== Cast ==
- Billy Burke as Chris Mankowski
- Christian Slater as Skip Gibbs
- Crispin Glover as Woody Ricks
- Michael Jai White as Donnell Lewis
- Bill Duke as Wendell Robinson
- Roger Bart as Jerry Baker
- Breanne Racano as Robin Abbott
- Sabina Gadecki as Greta Wyatt
- Andy Dick as Mark Ricks
- Gloria Hendry as Sgt. Maureen Downey
- Page Kennedy as Booker
- Leonard Robinson as Juicy Mouth

== Production ==
The film received $2.8 million in tax incentives from the state of Michigan.
