= Final Jeopardy (2001 film) =

- Genre: Drama
- Written by: Linda Fairstein; Adam Greenman
- Directed by: Nick Gomez
- Starring: Dana Delany; Billy Burke
- Country of origin: United States
- Original language: English

Production
- Executive producers: Dana Delany; Drew S. Levin; Larry Sanitsky
- Running time: 100 minutes
- Production companies: Elmwood Entertainment; Sanitsky Company; Team Entertainment

Original release
- Network: ABC
- Release: April 9, 2001

Final Jeopardy is a 2001 drama TV film based on a novel by Linda Fairstein and starring Dana Delany. Delany also produced the film, which premiered on ABC on April 9, 2001. The film was nominated for an Edgar Allan Poe Award for Best Television Feature or Miniseries in 2001.

== Cast ==
- Dana Delany as Alexandra Cooper
- Billy Burke as Mike Chapman
- Joelle Carter as Sandra Bonventre
- Chris Potter as Jed Seigel
- Sherman Augustus as Mercer Wallace
- Jeff Clark as William Montvale
- Colm Feore as Paul Battaglia
- Fulvio Cecere as Luther Waldron
- Karen Robinson as Laura Wilkie
- Jonathan Higgins as Patrick "Pat" McKinney
- Arnold Pinnock as Herman Miller
- Joe Pingue as Harold McCoy
- Bill Lake as Chief Flanders

== See also ==
- List of television films produced for American Broadcasting Company
