= Tyler Rich =

American country music singer (born 1986)

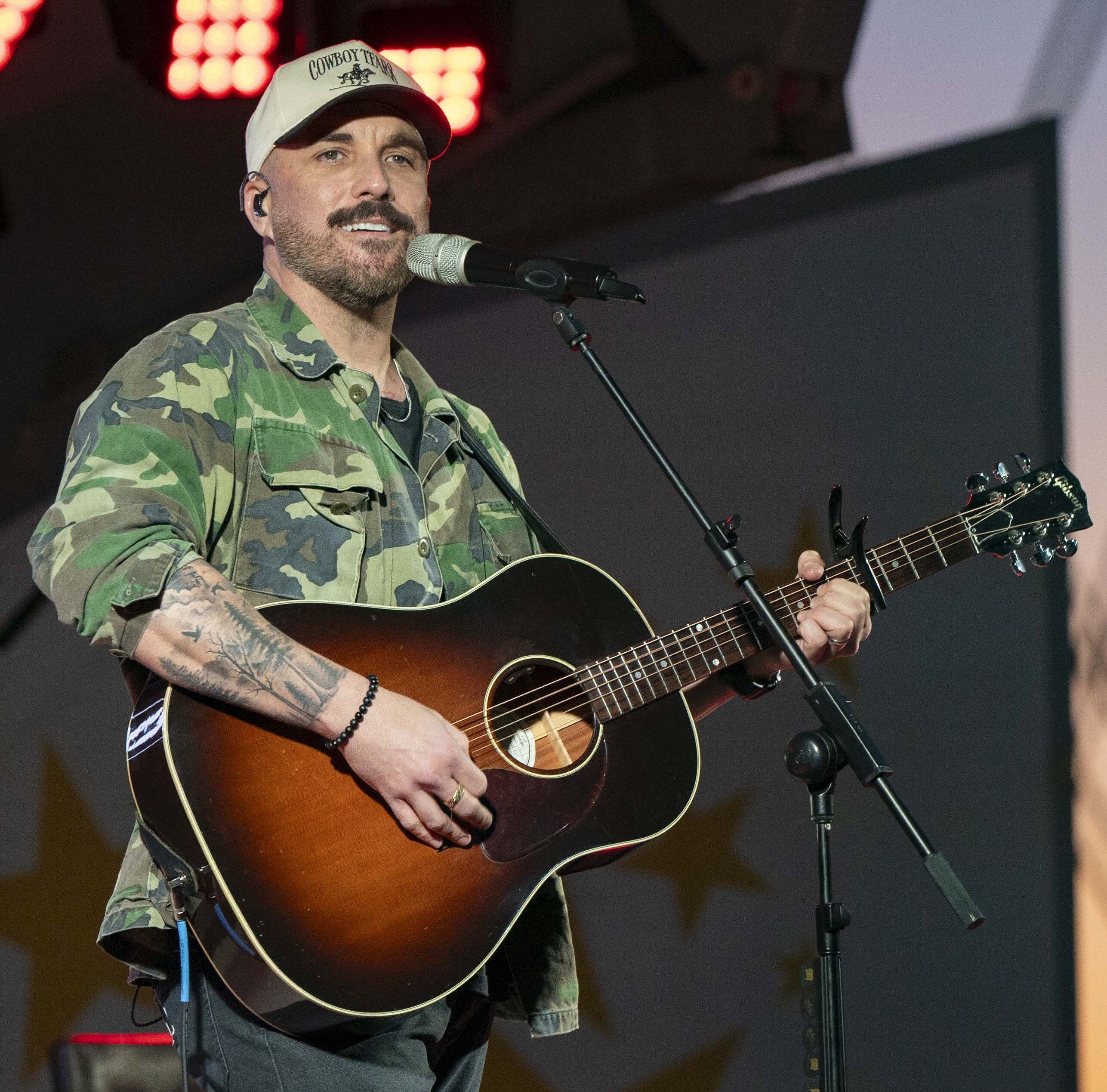
- Rich in 2024

Background information
- Born: Tyler Weinrich; February 24, 1986 (age 40); Yuba City, California
- Origin: Nashville, Tennessee
- Genres: Country
- Years active: 2014-present
- Label: Valory

Tyler Rich (born February 24, 1986) is an American country music singer. He was born Tyler Weinrich in Yuba City, California and began listening to country music at age eight. Rich began learning to play guitar at age 14 and, after graduating college, moved to Los Angeles, California. He self-released the single "Radio" in 2014. He also self-released a four-song extended play. After moving to Nashville, Tennessee, he was signed by Big Machine Records imprint Valory Music Group. The label issued his single "The Difference" in 2018. "The Difference" has charted on Hot Country Songs and Country Airplay and was certified Platinum by Music Canada and Gold in the U.S. by RIAA. The song, written by Rhett Akins, Devin Dawson, Benjamin Burgess, and Jacob Durrett, was inspired by Rich's wife (then fiancée), Sabina Rich (Gadeki). Rich began touring with Brett Young in late 2018.

Tyler Rich's debut album "Two Thousand Miles" was released on September 4, 2020. Tyler has amassed nearly half a billion global streams to date and notched three No. 1 hits on SiriusXM's The Highway with his debut album TWO THOUSAND MILES (The Valory Music Co.), featuring 2 GOLD-certified singles “The Difference” and "Leave Her Wild" plus subsequent releases “Better Than You’re Used To,” “A Little Bit of You” and “Trucks Don’t Lie.” In 2022, Tyler joined forces with one of Canada's most successful bilingual singer-songwriters, Marie-Mai for a duet on “Thinkin’ We’re In Love” in both English and French.

== Discography ==
=== Albums ===
Year	Album
2020	Two Thousand Miles: Released: September 4, 2020; Label: Valory

=== Extended plays ===
Year	Album
2015	Valerie: Released: August 11, 2015; Label: self-released; Formats: CD, digital download, streaming
2018	Tyler Rich EP: Released: September 21, 2018; Label: Valory; Formats: CD, digital download, streaming
2020	Live at Home: Released: July 31, 2020; Label: Valory; Formats: CD, digital download, streaming
2023	I Know You Do: Released: March 31, 2023; Label: Valory; Formats: CD, digital download, streaming
2023	Unplugged In Nashville: Released: May 19, 2023; Label: Valory; Formats: CD, digital download, streaming

=== Charted singles ===
Year	Single	Peak chart positions	
Year	Single	US Country	US Country Airplay
2018	"The Difference"	30	21

=== Music videos ===
Year	Video	Director
2018	"The Difference"	Mason Dixon
2020	"Feels Like Home"	Aaron Eisenberg

== Certifications and Sales ==
Region	Certification	Certified units/sales
United States (RIAA)	Gold	500,000^{‡}
Canada (Music Canada)	Platinum	80,000^{‡}
^{‡} Sales+streaming figures based on certification alone.
