= Step on a Crack =

2007 novel by James Patterson

- First edition
- Author: James Patterson and Michael Ledwidge
- Language: English
- Series: Michael Bennett (book series)
- Genre: Thriller, Mystery novel
- Publisher: Little, Brown
- Publication date: February 6, 2007
- Publication place: United States
- Media type: Print (Hardcover)
- Pages: 400 pp (first edition, hardback)
- ISBN: 0-316-01394-3 (first edition, hardback)
- OCLC: 70673176
- Dewey Decimal: 813/.54 22
- LC Class: PS3566.A822 S74 2007
- Followed by: Run For Your Life (2009)

Step on a Crack is the first novel in the Michael Bennett series by James Patterson and Michael Ledwidge featuring Detective Michael Bennett and his 10 children. It was released on February 6, 2007.

== Plot summary ==
When a beloved former First Lady dies, an elaborate funeral is held at St. Patrick's Cathedral in New York City. Many famous people, including actors and politicians, attend. During the service, gunmen seal the cathedral and take all of the celebrities inside hostage. Knowing that each of their captives is enormously wealthy, they demand a ransom from each captive personally. While the lawyers, families, and talent agents of each of the famous captives assembles their ransom, the gunmen periodically kill and toss out hostages, including the current mayor of New York City.

NYPD Detective Michael Bennett is the lead negotiator with the gunmen. Through the course of his involvement, he consults with the FBI, goes on a botched raid of the cathedral in which an FBI agent and an NYPD officer die. Meanwhile, he learns that his wife, Maeve, who has cancer, has short time to live.

When the gunmen receive their ransom, they demand a fleet of identical-looking sedans be brought to the cathedral. The NYPD provides the sedans with the intent of using snipers to kill each gunman as he exits the cathedral. Unfortunately, everyone emerges from the cathedral dressed identically in hoods and robes—it is impossible to differentiate gunman from hostage. The hostages and gunmen pile into each of the sedans and drive off. Bennett and the NYPD and FBI follow from helicopters as the sedans travel a route that the gunmen had demanded be blocked off.

From the helicopter, Bennett struggles to figure out where the sedans are going. Eventually the sedans break off into two groups—one headed east and one west. Neither group of sedans stops and both eventually end up careening into the Hudson and East rivers. Once submerged, the gunmen escape with the help of SCUBA equipment they stashed in the rivers earlier. The hostages all surface and are rescued.

One sedan, however, did not make it to a river, having instead been hijacked by the hostages inside. The sedan crashes into a car dealership where the gunman inside dies after being impaled on a motorcycle's handlebars. After learning that the dead gunman has gone to great lengths to hide his identity (by burning his fingerprints off, for example), Bennett believes that the bad guys have won and returns home to his family.

On Christmas Eve, Bennett and his ten adopted children visit Maeve in the hospital and give her the presents they have for her. After the children leave for home, Bennett and Maeve get some time to themselves. Maeve's cancer gets worse and as the clock strikes 12 on Christmas day, she tells Bennett she loves him and wants him to be happy before dying. After she dies, a tearful Bennett walks home and tells his children the news, who all grieve along with him. They have her funeral and begin to move on with their lives.

After nearly a week later, Bennett and the NYPD and the FBI are able to determine the dead gunman's identity, through some of his hair, and that he was a corrections officer at the infamous Sing Sing prison, giving them the break they have been waiting for.

Bennett and other officers travel to Sing Sing and determine that a group of corrections officers staged a sick out on the morning of the cathedral incident. The lead gunman then reveals himself as one of the officers escorting Bennett around the prison and proceeds to beat Bennett up. The beating ends when Bennett throws the gunman up against a cell and the prisoner inside, seeking retribution against the gunman's cruelty as a prison guard, puts the gunman in a chokehold. Bennett manages to free the lead gunman and the story ends with Bennett driving him back to face charges in New York City.

With all criminals arrested, Bennett enjoys the coming New Year with his children, who all are still grieving for Maeve and trying to move on.

== Film adaptation ==
In an interview with Vanity Fair, Patterson announced that a film adaption of Step on a Crack is in the works.

== Release details ==
- 2007, US, Little Brown ISBN 0-316-01394-3), 6 February 2007, Hardback
