= Divine Access =

- Directed by: Steven Chester Prince
- Written by: Steven Chester Prince; John A. O'Connell; Michael Zagst
- Produced by: Carissa Buffel; Billy Burke; Terry G. Jones; Kevin Matusow; Steven Chester Prince
- Starring: Billy Burke; Patrick Warburton; Joel David Moore; Sarah Shahi; Dora Madison Burge; Adrienne Barbeau; Gary Cole
- Cinematography: Julie Kirkwood
- Edited by: Kindra Marra
- Music by: Casey McPherson
- Production companies: Traveling Picture Show Company; G-Men Media
- Distributed by: Freestyle Digital Media
- Release date: April 11, 2015 (Sarasota)
- Running time: 113 minutes
- Country: United States
- Language: English

Divine Access is a 2015 American comedy-drama film directed by Steven Chester Prince and starring Billy Burke, Gary Cole, Patrick Warburton, Adrienne Barbeau and Dora Madison Burge. It is Prince's directorial debut and Burke served as a producer of the film.

== Plot ==
Jack Harriman lives an ordinary life next to a lake in Texas, sometimes getting work in construction. His friend Bob produces a cable access show about religion called "Divine Access". Bob invites Jack to appear on the show to discuss religion with host Rev. Guy Roy Davis and a man named Pete who is obsessed with the power of pyramids. Jack, who does not belong to a specific religion but thinks highly of many religious leaders, becomes very popular with viewers, to the dismay of Rev. Davis who protests that the show was his. Rev. Davis is later fired from the show and from his job in a grocery store, where he behaves erratically using a ventriloquist dummy resembling Jesus. Bob sends Jack out on tour to speak about his views and inspire people. Nigel accompanies Bob, intending to serve as a catcher for people who fall down when blessed, as people do at Christian revival meetings. As they travel through Texas, Jack meets Marian, who is following him and questioning Jack's sincerity as well as his concern for the consequences of following his advice. They pick up Amber, a prostitute who seems to have no place to go, and she eventually moves in with Jack. Jack continues to deal with obsessed followers, including some who show up at his home. Jack's mother Catherine also comes to visit. There is one final meeting of Jack's followers before a tragic event.

== Cast ==
- Billy Burke as Jack Harriman
- Patrick Warburton as Bob
- Gary Cole as Reverend Guy Roy Davis
- Sarah Shahi as Marian
- Dora Madison Burge as Amber
- Joel David Moore as Nigel
- Barak Hardley as Pete "Pyramid Pete"
- Adrienne Barbeau as Catherine
- Austin Lyon as Caller
- Katherine Willis as Amber's Mom
- Michael Zagst as Lonnie

== Reception ==
The film has a 67% rating on Rotten Tomatoes. Jake Nevins of Paste gave it a rating of 6.5. On Vudu the reviewers have given it a 3.5 star rating.
