= Welcome to Willits =

2016 film by Trevor Ryan

- Theatrical release poster
- Directed by: Trevor Ryan
- Written by: Tim Ryan
- Produced by: Jon Keeyes; Scott Levenson; Jordan Yale Levine; Shaun Sanghani
- Starring: Bill Sage; Sabina Gadecki; Anastasia Baranova; Dolph Lundgren; Thomas Dekker; Chris Zylka; Garrett Clayton; Rory Culkin; Serge Levin
- Cinematography: Che Broadnax
- Edited by: Phillip Blackford
- Music by: Jeremy Little
- Production companies: Yale Productions; SSS Entertainment
- Distributed by: IFC Midnight
- Release date: November 11, 2016 (New York City Horror Film Festival)
- Running time: 84 minutes
- Country: United States
- Language: English
- Budget: $464,770

Welcome to Willits (also known as Alien Hunter) is a 2016 American science fiction comedy horror film directed by Trevor Ryan and starring Bill Sage, Sabina Gadecki, Anastasia Baranova, Dolph Lundgren, Thomas Dekker, Chris Zylka, Serge Levin, Garrett Clayton, and Rory Culkin.

== Plot ==
Deep in the Northern California woods, in the heart of the notorious Emerald Triangle, lies a remote cabin. Brock (Bill Sage) is a marijuana farmer and methamphetamine user/dealer in the area who believes his farms have been invaded by aliens. Brock's paranoia continues to grow, which may be PTSD from a past alien abduction and torture. In his spare time, Brock watches the police procedure TV show "Fists of Justice", starring Dolph Lundgren as a violent policeman.

Other residents of the area are allegedly suffering from attacks from mysterious creatures.

When Brock catches a wayward group of young campers on his land, he hallucinates the campers into aliens and the situation quickly escalates into total carnage.

== Cast ==
- Bill Sage as Brock, a paranoid, drug-addicted pot farmer and meth dealer.
- Sabina Gadecki as Peggy, Brock's wife
- Anastasia Baranova as Courtney, Brock's niece
- Chris Zylka as Jeremiah
- Garrett Clayton as Zack
- Thomas Dekker as Klaus
- Rory Culkin as "Possum"
- Dolph Lundgren as Officer Derek Hutchinson, a fictional police officer on Brock's favorite television show
- Serge Levin as Officer Jackson, Derek Hutchinson's partner

== Production ==
An adaptation of the sci-fi/horror short "Welcome to Willits: After Sundown."

The first film was made by the Ryans. Filmed in Louisiana, Los Angeles, and Willits, California.

== Reception ==
=== Critical response ===
The Los Angeles Times found the film promising with loopy energy, but finally the movie was unfocused. They found the film promising enough to hope for more efforts from the filmmakers.

The Horror Society praised the film, finding it amazingly original. They praised the dialogue and the effects.,

Dread Central praised the film, finding it one of the best independent horror films of the year.

Rue Morgue far preferred the short the film is based on, ridiculing the long version for "obnoxious characters, awful pacing and some of the worst practical/special effects that’s ever been produced."
