= Daniel X: Armageddon =

Book by James Patterson

- Hardcover Edition
- Author: James Patterson
- Cover artist: Owen Richardson
- Language: English
- Series: Daniel X series
- Genre: Fiction
- Published: 2012 Little, Brown
- Publication place: The United States of America
- Media type: Print (Hardcover)
- Pages: 320 pp (first edition, hardcover)
- ISBN: 0316101796 (first edition, hardcover)

Daniel X: Armageddon is the fifth installment in the Daniel X series by James Patterson. Armageddon was published by Little, Brown for Young Readers in October 2012. The main character, Daniel X, is a teenager from Alpar Nok sent to Earth to protect it from the most dangerous alien criminals in the galaxy. In Armageddon, the setting takes place in the 2000s, and Daniel X has to bring down an alien known as "Number 2," the second most powerful criminal, and is literally, The Devil.

== Summary ==
Daniel has just defeated Numbers 6 and 5 on the List of Alien Outlaws and now must defeat Number 2, or Abbadon, before he takes over the world. Daniel finds out about Number 2's plans and retreats to an amusement park with his friends. He is then interrupted by a group who turns out is a branch of the FBI dealing with extraterrestrials, the IOU. He meets Agent Judge and finds out he worked with Daniel's parents. At Agent Judge's ranch in Kentucky, he meets his father's spiritual adviser Xanthos the Jamaican horse. He also meets Agent Judge's daughter, Melody, and quickly falls in love. Number 2 continues to show his greater power by destroying cities and turning the human race against Daniel, and Daniel continues to struggle to find a way to beat him. Number 2 then kills Xanthos and kidnaps Melody, and to save them Daniel must travel to Hell itself. Daniel brings along his friends, Willy, Joe, Emma, and Dana, and a squad of the best fighters including Navy SEALs and members of the IOU. Daniel is halfway through the journey in Hell when his father reveals he must leave Daniel, and he tells his all the secrets he has been keeping from him. His father then dissolves into dust and Daniel and his mother release him in the wind. Daniel's mother then tells Daniel she must leave as well because she and his father were soul mates, and soul mates are never far apart. Daniel learns that Number 2 is Satan himself and is from the same planet as Daniel, but uses his powers to destroy rather than create. In the final battle Daniel uses the clues he gathered from his friends to defeat Abbadon by simply thinking he is dead. When Daniel defeats Number 2, everything is back to normal as they realize Number 2 just made them all believe he was destroying the world. Daniel is no longer able to create his parents or his friends and feels alone again. Melody then arrives and he notices a scar exactly like the one Dana received in an earlier battle. He then realizes that Melody is Dana, and that is why she reminded him so much of her.

== Series ==
After the success of The Dangerous Days of Daniel X, Patterson followed up with several sequel books: Watch the Skies (2009), Demons and Druids (2010), Game Over (2011), Armageddon (2012), and Lights Out (2015).
