= Anastasia Baranova =

Russian actress

- Aнастасия Баранова
- Born: 23 April 1989 (age 35); Moscow, Russian SFSR, Soviet Union
- Occupation: Actress
- Years active: 2002–present

Anastasia Baranova (Russian: Aнастасия Баранова; born 23 April 1989) is a Russian actress, best known for her starring roles as Jennifer "Scout" Lauer on the television series Scout's Safari and as Addison "Addy" Carver on the Syfy series Z Nation.

== Biography ==
Baranova was born in Moscow, Russia, in what was then part of the Soviet Union. As a child, she began modeling in Moscow. In 1998, Baranova and her mother, Ata, moved from Russia to Minnesota in the United States, where she continued to model. In 2000, they moved to California, where Baranova began her acting career. To learn the English language, she used the JumpStart CD-ROM series and took speech and singing classes. She is fluent in both Russian and English, and studied at Chapman University.

She is a graduate of the Los Angeles-based school The Acting Corps. As of 2010, she lives in Los Angeles, California.

== Career ==
Baranova began her acting career in 2002 with a small speaking role on the Disney Channel series Lizzie McGuire. She then won the lead role for the Discovery Kids/NBC television series Scout's Safari, playing the character Jennifer "Scout" Lauer. Filming began in July 2002, and primarily took place at locations around South Africa. The series ran from October 2002 to February 2004, lasting two seasons and 26 episodes.

Baranova has had one- or two-episode appearances on several television series, including Sons of Anarchy, Joan of Arcadia, Veronica Mars, Drake & Josh, 7th Heaven, and Malcolm in the Middle. She also appeared in the 2007 film Rise: Blood Hunter. In 2010, she made an appearance on the HDNet series Svetlana.

In 2014, Baranova joined the cast of the Syfy post-apocalyptic horror-comedy-drama series Z Nation, playing the role of Addison "Addy" Carver.

In the 2019 video game Metro Exodus she voiced the character of Katya.

== Filmography ==
Film roles
Year	Title	Role	Notes
2007	Rise: Blood Hunter	Teen girl	
2011	Apocalypse, CA	Giant interviewee 2	
2014	Mostly Ghostly: Have You Met My Ghoulfriend?	Young Emma	
2016	Welcome to Willits	Courtney	

Television roles
Year	Title	Role	Notes
2002	Lizzie McGuire	Cara Gunther	Episode: "Over the Hill"
2002–04	Scout's Safari	Jennifer "Scout" Lauer	Lead role
2004	Joan of Arcadia	Exchange Student	Episode: "No Bad Guy"
2004–05	Veronica Mars	Lizzie Manning	Episodes: "Like a Virgin", "Green-Eyed Monster"
2005	Drake & Josh	Yooka	Episode: "We're Married"
2005	7th Heaven	Lizzie Wheeler	Episode: "Ring Around the Rosie"
2005	Malcolm in the Middle	Sonja	Episode: "Blackout"
2010	Svetlana	Nastya	Episode: "Wish Fulfillment"
2012	90210	Reece Turner	Episode: "902-100"
2013	Sons of Anarchy	Escort	Episode: "Huang Wu"
2014–2018	Z Nation	Addison "Addy" Carver	Lead role: 46 episodes
2017	Syn	Xael	Lead role: 17 episodes

Video game roles
Year	Title	Role	Notes
2011	Rise of Nightmares	Sacha / Tasha	
2011	The Darkness II	Angelus / Venus / Additional Voices	
2014	Yaiba: Ninja Gaiden Z	Miss Monday	
2015	Evolve	Additional voices	
