= Sabina Gadecki =

American actress and model

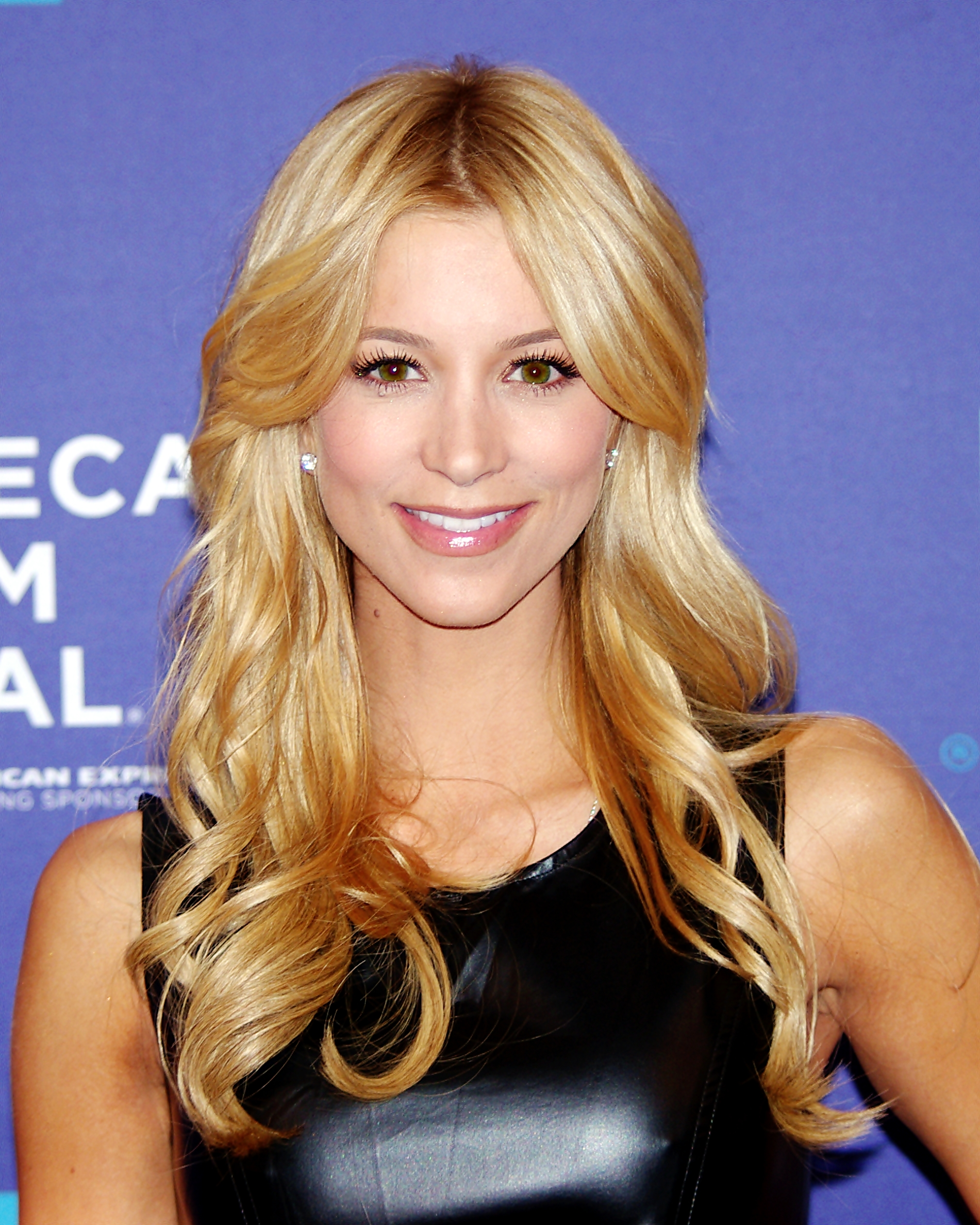
- Gadecki in 2012
- Occupations: Actress, model
- Years active: 2009–present
- Spouse: Tyler Rich (m. 2019)

Sabina Gadecki is an American actress and fashion model.

== Career ==
In 2007, she gained attention as the host of World Poker Tour on The Travel Channel, and she went on to sign with Ford Models. Gadecki has modeled for several brands, including Saks Fifth Avenue, Oil of Olay, Banana Republic and Jimmy Choo. She is a former Miss Polonia America and Miss Polonia World. She is currently signed to Wilhelmina Models in Los Angeles.

Gadecki has had major recurring roles in TV shows such as L.A.'s Finest starring Gabrielle Union and Jessica Alba, and also appeared in Narcos: Mexico, The Affair and House of Lies. She played Melanie in the comedy film Entourage (2015) alongside Jeremy Piven and Adrian Grenier.

== Personal life ==
Gadecki dated her Entourage co-star Kevin Connolly from 2015 to 2016. Gadecki began dating country music singer Tyler Rich, after meeting at Stagecoach Festival in 2016. The couple married in Murfreesboro, Tennessee, in September 2019. The couple appeared on the Winter/Spring 2020 cover of Southern Bride magazine. Rich wrote the song, "Leave Her Wild" for Gadecki.

== Filmography ==
=== Film ===
Year	Title	Role	Notes
2009	Jonas Brothers: The 3D Concert Experience	Girlfriend	Documentary film
2012	Freaky Deaky	Greta Wyatt	
2014	Tweet Me in NY	Farret Face	Short film
2014	Dark Was the Night	Clair	
2015	Entourage	Melanie	
2016	Welcome to Willits	Peggy	
2017	72 Hours: A Love Story	Pam	Short film
2018	The Ninth Passenger	Tina	
2018	Dangerous Matrimony	Bridget	
2018	The Bobby Roberts Project	Katie Sherwood	
2019	The Experience	Abigail Evans	
2020	The Office Mix-Up	Cynthia	
2020	Honesty Weekend	Delaney Danton	
2021	False Positive	Rita	
2022	Bee the Change	Narrator	
2022	Dark Asset	Vivian	
2026	Wrong Side of Dead	Amber	

=== Television ===
Year	Title	Role	Notes
2007	World Poker Tour	Herself / Host	5 episodes
2009	The Superagent	Lady Dynamite	TV film
2010	White Collar	Madison Cookler	Episode: "Hard Sell"
2010	Law & Order	Brenna Lane	Episode: "Crashers"
2012	House of Lies	Malina	Episode: "The Mayan Apocalypse"
2012	Sketchy	Ivy	Episode: "Crook'd Smile"
2012	The League	Tiffany	Episode: "The Vapora Sport"
2013	Inside Amy Schumer	Tiffany	Episode: "Sex Tips"
2014	Outlaw Prophet: Warren Jeffs	Rebecca Musser	TV film
2015	Finding Carter	Abby	Episodes: "Wake Up Call", "Something to Talk About"
2016	The Adult Swim Golf Classic	Poppy	TV film
2018	Narcos: Mexico	Mandy Buehl	Episode: "La Última Frontera"
2019	The Affair	Hannah	Episode: "5.7"
2019	L.A.'s Finest	Jen Striker	Recurring role; 9 episodes
2023–2024	Fire Country	Cara	Recurring role; 9 episodes
