= Scout's Safari =

- The main characters of Scout's Safari, from left, Cheryl, Roger, Scout, Tyler, Bongani and C.B.
- Created by: Thomas W. Lynch
- Starring: Anastasia Baranova; Freedom Hadebe; Jarred Uys; Chantell Stander; Ashley Dowds; Hlomla Dandala
- Composers: Reg Powell; Andrew R. Powell; Chris Powell
- Country of origin: United States
- Original language: English
- No. of seasons: 2
- No. of episodes: 26

Production
- Executive producer: Thomas W. Lynch
- Producers: Gary L. Stephenson; Rocky Bester (S2); Ron Oliver (S2); David Wicht (S2)
- Production location: South Africa
- Cinematography: David Aenmey
- Editors: Uta Frey (S1); Tanja Hagen (S2)
- Running time: 22 minutes

Original release
- Network: Discovery Kids; NBC
- Release: October 5, 2002 – February 7, 2004

Scout's Safari is an American teen comedy-drama television series that aired on Discovery Kids and Saturday mornings on NBC. The series was created by Thomas W. Lynch (The Secret World of Alex Mack, Caitlin's Way).

== Premise ==
The show revolves around Jennifer "Scout" Lauer, a teenage girl who lives the simple life in New York City until her photographer father is sent on year-round trip around the world and she is forced to live with her know-it-all mother (Cheryl) and her new husband (Roger) at a resort in South Africa. While she is there she is exposed to a new world, goes to a new school, and reunites with her other best friend named Bongani, who believes strongly in his Zulu culture, lives with his Uncle C.B., a veterinarian. Bongani is often the voice of reason for Scout. While still keeping in contact with her best friend Sherna via webcam, she has to deal with her stepdad's bratty and Know-it-All young son Tyler. During the course of the series Scout eventually becomes more comfortable in her new surroundings.

== Cast ==
=== Main ===
- Anastasia Baranova as Jennifer "Scout" Lauer
- Freedom Hadebe as Bongani
- Jarred Uys as Tyler Shickler
- Chantell Stander as Cheryl Lauer-Shickler
- Ashley Dowds as Roger Shickler
- Hlomla Dandala as Carlton "C.B." Boone

=== Supporting ===
- Dana de Agrella as Sherna Puckett
- Ma Afrika Kekana as Nandi Ngwenyo
- Phelisa Thulisile Mandeka.

== Episodes ==
Season	Episodes	Originally released	
Season	Episodes	First released	Last released
1	13	October 5, 2002	February 15, 2003
2	13	September 13, 2003	February 7, 2004

=== Season 1 (2002–03) ===
No. overall	No. in season	Title	Directed by	Written by	Original release date	Prod. code	US viewers (millions)
1	1	"Departure"	Lamont Kingclip	Thomas W. Lynch	October 5, 2002	000	N/A
While living in New York, Scout comes home to find that her father Dennis has been assigned to a new cover story for a year-round trip, and he has booked her to spend time with her mother Cheryl and new husband Roger at their lodge in South Africa. Upon arrival, it becomes clear that Scout has completely forgotten her childhood there, as well as her childhood friend Bongani, and a salesman, Max Trunsten, is expressing his interest in buying the lodge and turning it into a hotel. While out scouting with Bongani's uncle C.B. and her obnoxious stepbrother Tyler, Scout and Bongani wander off and barely escape from a wildebeest stampede that was startled by gunshots. The pair are left alone after dark and are picked up and carried back to the lodge by Trunsten, and find convincing evidence that he is really a poacher. Scout suddenly remembers how a village from her childhood was bulldozed in a similar manner, and tells Trunsten off, finally beginning to show signs of accepting her new surroundings.
2	2	"Lost in Africa"	Steve Markowitz	Thomas Chehak	October 12, 2002	002	N/A
Scout travels with Cheryl and Bongani to a nearby town in hopes of finding what she considers civilization. She goofs around with Bongani and runs off, and is accidentally pushed onto a bus and left stranded on the side of the road. A young village woman leads Scout to her home and introduces her to their way of life, and Scout, remembering what Bongani had taught her earlier, uses newfound skills in warding off a wild cobra that has wandered into the village. In the meantime, C.B. and Tyler catch a meerkat with a foaming mouth and C.B. has it tested for rabies, while Tyler lets it out despite C.B. warning him not to. Fortunately, the meerkat is rabies-free - the foam was from eating a frog - and Cheryl and the others bring Scout home with a newfound respect for Zulu culture.
3	3	"An Elephant Never Forgets"	Lamont Kingclip	Thomas W. Lynch & Thomas Chehak	October 26, 2002	001	N/A
Scout begins to express her fear of wild animals after not being around them for so long, but is reluctant to admit it. Scout, Bongani, and C.B. drive out to release an ostrich into the wild and are nearly trampled by an elephant stampede that is being hunted by poachers and knocks their jeep aside. One of the youngest members is left behind with an injured leg, and Scout hides in a tree from fear of it, forcing Bongani to leave her behind and run back to the lodge for help. Scout falls from the tree and is trapped under a branch, but the elephant helps her pull it off and retriggers her childhood love for the animals. They manage to evade the poachers who killed the elephant's mother and bring her back to the lodge. Meanwhile, Tyler tries to bond with the son of a visiting couple who has little interest outside of his video game, but manages to win him over by showing him some of the animals. Scout decides to name the elephant Sherna in honor of her friend from New York.
4	4	"Science Friction"	Steve Markowitz	Thomas Chehak	November 9, 2002	003	N/A
Scout is sent with Tyler to her first year of school in South Africa where she meets Sophie and Nandi, and instantly bonds with the latter. Scout and Nandi accidentally wander off from their group during a class field trip trying to find the bus and fall into a poacher's trap with a snake, but are pulled out after being found and learn that the snake is harmless. On the bus, Scout decided to take full punishment for not staying with her group, and decides to become the class clown. Back at the lodge, Roger tries to fix an old jeep to use on safari tours, but soon realizes that it's not worth it.
5	5	"The Lie"	Lamont Kingclip	Thomas W. Lynch	November 23, 2002	005	N/A
Scout picks up Nandi on the way to school and believes her to be living a rich life after seeing her house. Bongani attempts to get tickets for the upcoming soccer tournament and Scout suggests watching the game with Nandi at her house, but she keeps coming up with excuses for them not to visit, and even begins to get a cold attitude. Scout and Bongani follow Nandi and find that she lives in a settlement full of squatters, and lied about her life out of embarrassment; Scout assures that she is Nandi's friend no matter where she lives. Cheryl and C.B. get reports of a wounded lioness with a cub and set out to find them, and find that Tyler has stowed away in the back of the jeep. They find that the mother did not survive, but manage to rescue the cub.
6	6	"Rites of Passage"	Steve Markowitz	Jonas Agin	December 7, 2002	004	N/A
Scout witnesses several different religions: Bongani is preparing to become a man in his Zulu culture, Nandi is being baptized as a Christian, and Sherna has gotten a bat mitzvah, which leaves Scout wondering about what her journey to adulthood will be like and heads out into the wilderness to find out. While doing so, she finds a trapped lion cub and is cornered by a sick hyena that Roger and Tyler spotted during a travelling tour. Scout manages to rescue the cub and the hyena is sedated. Cheryl gives Scout a necklace as a sign that she is meant to be in Africa and help take care of the animals there.
7	7	"Constellation Consolation"	Lamont Kingclip	Thomas Chehak & Kevin Arnovitz	December 14, 2002	006	N/A
Scout prepares to go camping with Cheryl for some mother-daughter bonding as a part of her class field trip, but winds up going with Roger at the last minute when Cheryl and Tyler are infected with a bug and catch a fever that soon begins to spread to the guests. Scout is reluctant to bond with Roger, as he is only her stepfather, and wind up having to cancel the camping trip when it begins to rain and leaves the jeep stuck in the mud, forcing them to travel to higher ground. Unfortunately, the only way is across a rope bridge above a raging river, but Roger helps Scout across and they bond over star constellations. At the lodge, a critic begins to write a review on the lodge after seeing the conditions there, but Cheryl and C.B. get him to bond with some of the animals, which gets him to write a positive review. Scout and Roger return home with a newfound respect for each other.
8	8	"Released"	Steve Markowitz	Jessica Klein	January 4, 2003	009	N/A
Tyler begins to have nightmares of a giant spider and begins to suffer from a lack of sleep. The group decides to take Tyler to a witch doctor to cure him, and she mixes a potion and puts him through a Zulu ritual to help rid him of his dreams. The attempt proves successful, as Tyler dreams of the spider shrinking and finds that it was a tarantula that got loose under his bed. In the meantime, Scout attempts to make a video of a zebra being released into the wild. Through a talk with her friend Sherna, Scout gets inspired to convince the others to find and introduce another zebra to theirs, which proves successful and it is accepted into the herd.
9	9	"The Visitor"	Ken Kaplan	Thomas W. Lynch	January 11, 2003	008	N/A
Scout's friend Sherna comes to South Africa to visit for the week. The visit starts off alright, but soon turns south when Sherna immediately begins to bond with Bongani and embraces the Zulu lifestyle, making Scout feel left out. The two girls end up fighting and disrupt the festival, but a talk with Bongani helps Scout to realize what it means to lose a friend and the girls reconcile before Sherna returns to New York. At the lodge, a tourist films C.B. warding off an agitated elephant, but the footage is edited to make him out to be abusing the animals and is harassed by a reporter. The tourist admits to the magistrate that he edited the footage for the news and received money for it, and C.B. is cleared of all charges while the tourist is sued on account of fraud.
10	10	"Time to Go"	Alan Leslie	Thomas W. Lynch	January 18, 2003	007	N/A
Sherna the elephant is beginning to act up on account of her age, and it begins to concern everyone at the lodge. Scout thinks she can train Sherna to behave and seems to be succeeding at first, but it soon becomes clear that it is not working and Scout must face Sherna going to live with a new herd at a different reserve. Through talking with Bongani and Cheryl, Scout comes to accept that it is better for Sherna to move on and happily sees her off to her new sanctuary. Tyler tries to find a special trick to learn for the school talent show, but his efforts only irritate some of the guests. He eventually succeeds in teaching a parrot to talk and easily wins over the audience.
11	11	"A Night at the Lodge"	Ken Kaplan	Jessica Klein	January 25, 2003	010	N/A
A sudden thunderstorm causes a flood that washes out the roads, forcing everyone to spend the night at the lodge while Roger and C.B. try to hatch ostrich eggs. Scout spots a figure outside the window and is convinced she saw a ghost and that the house is haunted, especially after Cheryl tells her of a woman who was killed in a similar storm. Scout and Bongani go outside and perform a ritual to summon the ghost, who is found in the veterinary office and is revealed to be an old woman who was caught in the storm.
12	12	"Kruger's Gold"	Alan Leslie	Thomas Chehak	February 8, 2003	011	N/A
Scout and Tyler find a treasure map behind a picture frame and discover that it leads to gold left by Paul Kruger. With Bongani and Sophie tagging along, they head out to Mozambique to find it, but things soon go horribly wrong. They begin fighting over possession of the map, are followed by a man who overheard their conversation, run into a herd of rhinos, and fall into a river where Tyler loses his backpack and Sophie loses her father's metal detector. When they reach their destination, they meet an old hermit who tells them that there's no gold and reveals that their map is a fake. The foursome are grounded for running off, but accept that being rich is not worth losing a friend over.
13	13	"Fathers"	Alan Leslie	Thomas W. Lynch	February 15, 2003	012	N/A
Dennis is coming to South Africa for a visit after finishing his assignment, and everyone believes he is coming to take Scout back to New York. Cheryl is especially concerned having missed most of Scout's life growing up, and Scout is beginning to rethink returning with him, having begun to accept her new lifestyle. Dennis' visit is cut short when he finds that Max Trunsten, the businessman from "Departure", has bought and begun bulldozing one of his favorite places to build a casino, and is immediately suspected when Trunsten's machinery is found destroyed, but the culprit is later revealed to be Bongani. Scout and Dennis look through his photos and discover physical evidence to suggest that Trunsten is building on a sacred burial ground, which is against the law, and he is forced to cease production. After thinking about her father's visit, Scout admits that she is not ready to return to New York; Dennis says he just wants Scout to be happy and agrees to let her stay in South Africa for a little while longer.

=== Season 2 (2003–04) ===
No. overall	No. in season	Title	Directed by	Written by	Original release date	Prod. code	US viewers (millions)
14	1	"The Gift"	Lamont Kingclip	Thomas W. Lynch	September 13, 2003	013	N/A
An orphaned zebra is brought to the sanctuary and Scout successfully gets it to eat despite not knowing how. Bongani's grandmother says that Scout has a special gift to communicate with animals, but she initially refuses to believe it, even when she manages to feed the grandmother's parrot and calms down an agitated cobra. She initially begins to question it, however, when she accidentally leaves the gate unlocked and the zebra escapes, but learns from Bongani that having such a gift makes her special when her instincts help her to successfully tracks the zebra down. Meanwhile, the sanctuary is facing financial problems and Roger heads to a government building with Tyler to apply for government grant, but Tyler is convinced that he is a spy and goes undercover to prove it.
15	2	"Shark!"	Lamont Kingclip	Thomas W. Lynch	September 20, 2003	015	N/A
While snorkeling with Bongani and Sophie trying to find a bracelet she lost, Scout is frightened by a bull shark in the river. Bongani initially refuses to believe Scout at first and thinks she is just scaring herself, though Roger and C.B. believe otherwise and help to hire an expert to have the shark removed. The shark attacks their boat and, despite being on land, Bongani falls into the river and Scout manages to save him while the shark is tranquilized and taken back to the ocean. At the lodge, Roger and Cheryl attempt to have a giraffe moved to another sanctuary to reduce overpopulation on the reserve, and Tyler goes behind their backs and auctions the giraffe off to a circus attraction. The man who purchased the giraffe is given a refund and the shark expert, Pam, agrees to take the giraffe as well.
16	3	"The Ritual"	Hlomla Dandala	Jonas Agin	September 27, 2003	016	N/A
Bongani's father returns from his trucking business his family prepares for a Zulu celebration. Scout is offered to take part in it, but disapproves of the family's plan to sacrifice the goat on their farm, and sets it loose in the middle of the night, infuriating Bongani. Cheryl convinces Scout that killing the goat is just a part of life, and Scout returns the goat and makes amends with Bongani, now with a new respect for other cultures and religion. Bongani in return gives the goat to Scout and his father brings in another goat for the ceremony. At the lodge, Roger, C.B. and Tyler try to build new pens to make room for more animals, but Tyler just winds up annoying them with his constant criticisms for not following the guide book's directions. The men tell him to wait up at the house and finish the job without him, leaving Tyler feeling unneeded. When the plans to build the pens fall through, they realize Tyler was right and ask him for help, learning a big lesson in teamwork.
17	4	"Brushfire"	Kenneth Kaplan	Thomas W. Lynch & Lyle Weldon	October 25, 2003	014	N/A
Scout and Bongani go horseback riding for a picnic at Kahlundi Falls with some friends, which is cut short by an oncoming thunderstorm. Bongani tries to get everyone to return home, but Scout insists at staying and checking out the scenery when lightning strikes and sets off a brushfire that cuts them off from their friends. While Roger and Cheryl try to mount a rescue for them, Scout and Bongani come across a cheetah that guides them to the far side of a mountain on the opposite side from the fire, where they reunite with the others. At the lodge, Tyler tries to finish a school report to prove that he is just as responsible as Scout, but inadvertently lets the snakes in the clinic loose and they begin turning up all over the place. The snakes are all caught and Tyler is punished with cleaning the clinic.
18	5	"Potions"	Lamont Kingclip	Jessica Klein	November 29, 2003	017	N/A
Scout has bonded with an infant steenbok and grows concerned when it does not act as actively as it should. When diagnostics come back positive for cancer, Scout grows determined to save it despite everyone cautioning her that it may not work. Roger takes a pair of tourists that lost their passports to a crocodile to the city for a renewal, and Scout and a reluctant Bongani, who dislikes the city, tag along to find Bongani's cousin in order to find medicine for the steenbok. Unfortunately, the steenbok dies and is buried on the savannah, leaving Scout to ponder how wonderful life is.
19	6	"Live to Play"	Lamont Kingclip	Thomas W. Lynch	December 6, 2003	019	N/A
Bongani grows concerned when his team's goalie, James, begins to act strangely and stays home sick on the eve of a big soccer tournament. Scout grows concerned about Bongani's behavior when he accuses James of faking sickness and should play no matter how he is feeling, but Bongani soon learns that James is positive for HIV. The pair reconcile before the game and win the tournament, and Bongani gives the trophy to James. Meanwhile, various items have been disappearing from the lodge and clinic, and Tyler thinks that a thief is lurking around. It turns out that the thief was Tyler's pet mongoose.
20	7	"Ghost Cat"	Kenneth Kaplan	George Geiger	December 13, 2003	018	N/A
Scout finds that Bongani is spending time with a girl named Tula, who is convinced that a ghost cat is stalking her. When the cat apparently attacks Tula, her father orders it killed and Scout, through extensive research of a footprint, discovers that the culprit is actually an illegally imported Bengal tiger that has escaped. With help from C.B. and Bongani, she manages to locate the tiger and remove it from the area before the villagers can get a chance to kill it. At the lodge, Tyler tries to make money off of a visiting guest by walking her dog, but it escapes and he suspects it was eaten by one of the lions when he discovers the dog's collar in their pen. Fortunately, the dog is found playing in a pen with some pigs and promptly returned to its owner.
21	8	"Know It All"	Kenneth Kaplan	Say Laybourne	January 3, 2004	020	N/A
While Roger and Tyler go on a fishing trip, Scout stays behind to work at the sanctuary and insists that she is old enough to handle things when she grows annoyed with Cheryl's constant reminding of how to handle wild animals. Scout claims that she already knows what to do because of her connection with animals when they rescue a rhino caught in a poacher's trap. However, she neglects to lock the gate to the pen holding the rhino, which breaks out and leaves Cheryl injured and in the hospital, leaving Scout feeling guilty. Roger, having gone through a similar situation with his father on their fishing trip, consoles Scout, who apologizes to Cheryl and realizes how important it is to listen and follow instructions.
22	9	"Contraband"	Costas Gavriel	George Geiger	January 10, 2004	021	N/A
Scout and Bongani witness a helicopter crash and help to rescue the pilot as well as a white lion cub which was onboard and being transported from another sanctuary. While the pilot is left to recover, Scout finds evidence that he is actually a wanted smuggler trying to transport the lion out of the country, as white lions are extremely rare and can be sold for a lot of money, just as he is discovered missing and found driving off with the cub. Though told to stay behind for their safety, Scout and Bongani race after the smuggler and intercept him on horseback, just as Roger and C.B. arrive with the police, and the cub is taken to a safe location. In the meantime, Tyler tries to do extra chores to earn money, though his attempts to use the animals for it comes with consequences.
23	10	"Rumors"	Kenneth Kaplan	Jessica Klein	January 17, 2004	022	N/A
News spreads when Scout and Bongani are nominated in a poll and win the title of best couple in the school newspaper, courtesy of Tyler sending a photo of them together. At the same time, it is revealed that he has also called a news gathering for the wild release of a lioness imported from Italy as a publicity stunt in order to raise money and attract guests for the lodge, as well as get a raise in his allowance. The latter event does not go well, as the reporters make the lioness nervous and she nearly escapes, resulting in the sanctuary getting a poor review in the front pages. The incident at school leaves Scout and Bongani questioning their friendship; Scout insists that they are just friends, but at the same time they wonder if they will ever be more than that. After a talk with Cheryl and C.B., respectively, the two decide that they are happy just being in the relationship they are now and not let such a thing be rushed before they are ready.
24	11	"Diamonds"	Hlomla Dandala	George Geiger	January 24, 2004	023	N/A
While cleaning out around the sanctuary, Scout and Bongani find an old chest containing materials belonging to Scout's great-grandmother. Scout finds that she inherited her love of animals and the connection she had with them, and that she left notes in her diary about a diamond belonging to Bongani's tribe, which the chief had hidden to keep it safe from angry priests who wanted to destroy it. Scout and Bongani head out to search for the diamond, but soon find that it is not buried in the place they thought; it was actually hidden in the binder of the diary, which the chief had done so with help from her grandmother's childhood friend as it was private and the last place the priests would look. At the same time, Scout feels she has lost her connection with animals when she fails to sense a cobra that surprised her during the cleanup and an elephant that runs away from Tyler. With advice from Bongani's mother, Scout learns to let her instincts just happen on their own, and they kick in when she saves Bongani from being attacked by a spitting cobra. The diamond is given back to Bongani's tribe, and Scout leaves a note for her grandmother in the last page of her diary. Meanwhile, Tyler enters a video contest for hilarious animals in an attempt to win a new video camera for Roger, but his efforts fail miserably until Roger offers his help.
25	12	"My Big Fat Zulu Wedding"	Lamont Kingclip	Ron Oliver	January 31, 2004	025	N/A
CB, Bongani, and Scout are invited to the former's family tribe for a wedding, but things soon go awry. On the way to the wedding, their car breaks down and Scout loses her phone, which is then eaten by a rhinoceros which forces them to travel on foot. Upon their arrival, CB finds that his grandmother has gathered together several young women for him to choose to marry in the future, and Scout, while trying to fit in, accidentally insults a woman by refusing food, among other things deemed insulting to the Zulu culture, causing her to be looked down upon by the women of the tribe. Scout has a talk with the bride of the wedding who tells her that it is not easy to fit in, as she herself is leaving home to be with her new husband, and Scout wins the tribe's favor when the rhinoceros from earlier returns and she calls the phone it swallowed, startling it into running off, and she finally begins to adapt to the Zulu way of life. Meanwhile, Tyler plans a sleepover which turns out to be nothing but another attempt to make money by having his friends pay for a tour of the sanctuary and clinic. As usual, his plan backfires and he is sentenced to cleaning up animal manure.
26	13	"Life Goes On"	Kenneth Kaplan	Thomas W. Lynch	February 7, 2004	024	N/A
Change is in the air as Scout, while considering leaving back to New York to spend time with Sherna, finds that Bongani is accepting an offer from a boarding school in Cape Town, which will result in him moving far away. Scout is unsure of what to think of all the coming changes, but CB helps her realize that this is a big opportunity for Bongani, since his family has so little money. In the meantime, Tyler must face the inevitable when his pet lion cub Jumba is planned to be sent away after causing one too many messes around the lodge, and he runs off with the cub into the wild. After an incident with a male lion that was spotted in the area, Scout and CB help Roger and Cheryl mount a search party and Scout, using her gift, helps to locate the pair and helps Tyler realize that letting friends go is a part of growing up. The two siblings say goodbye to their respective friends, with Scout and Bongani vowing that they will always be a part of each other. However, Scout still laments her wish for a better word than goodbye. Series finale
