= Billy Burke (actor) =

American actor (born 1966)

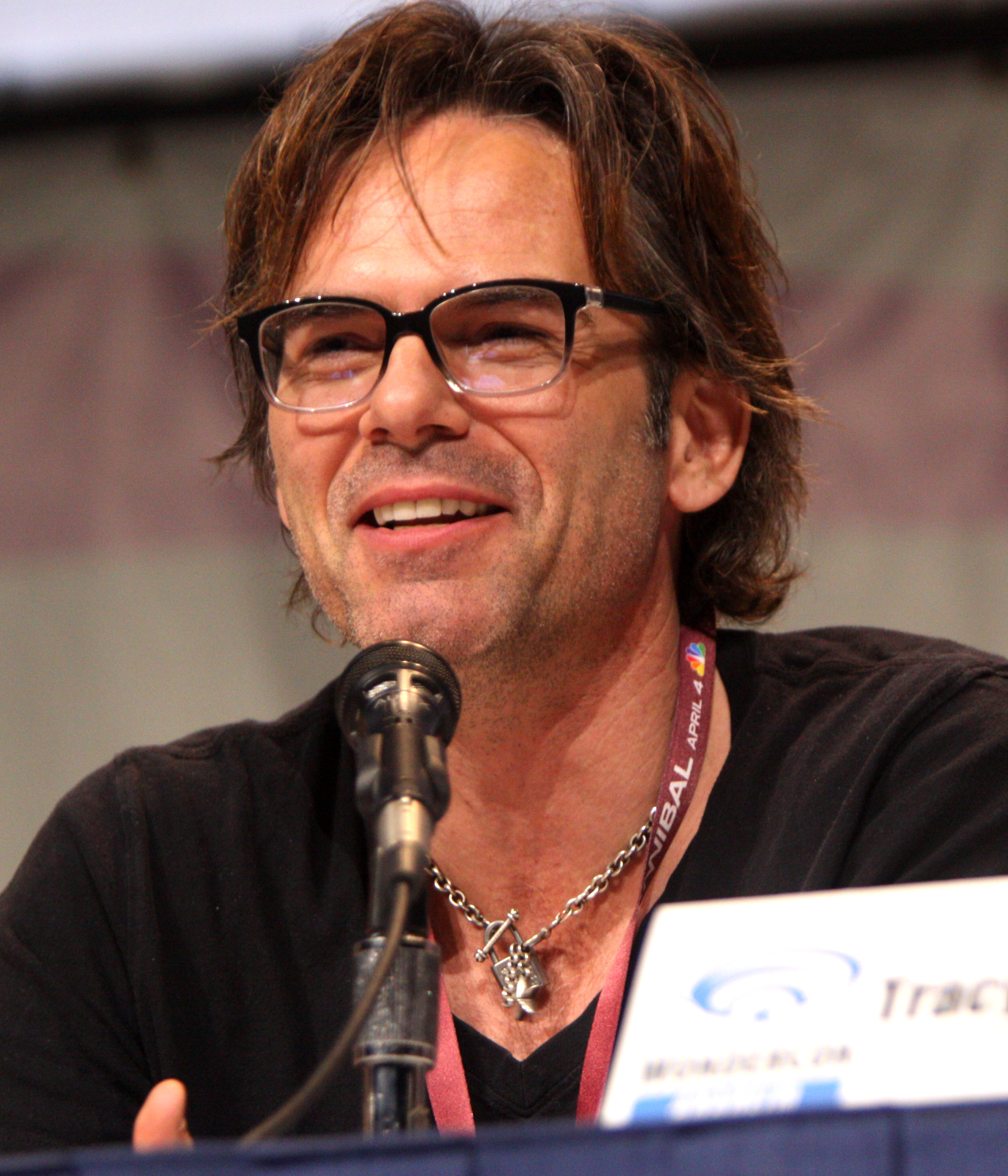
- Burke at WonderCon, Anaheim, California, March 30, 2013
- Born: William Albert Burke; November 25, 1966 (age 59); Bellingham, Washington, U.S.
- Occupation: Actor
- Years active: 1990–present
- Spouse: Pollyanna Rose
- Children: 1

William Albert Burke (born November 25, 1966) is an American actor. Burke is known for his role as Charlie Swan in The Twilight Saga. In 2011, he played Cesaire in Red Riding Hood. In 2012, he was cast as one of the lead characters, Miles Matheson, in the NBC science-fiction series Revolution. From 2015 to 2017, he starred in the CBS series Zoo. He has also appeared in the supernatural horror film Lights Out (2016) and the thriller Breaking In (2018).

== Early life ==
Burke was born in Bellingham, Washington. He graduated from Sehome High School in 1984.

== Career ==
His television credits include roles in Star Trek: Deep Space Nine (in the episode "Second Skin"), Party of Five, Gilmore Girls, Karen Sisco, Fringe, Monk, and The Closer (Season 4, episode 13, "Power of Attorney") playing Phillip Stroh, a serial rapist and murderer, a character revisited in Major Crimes (see below). His motion picture credits include Jane Austen's Mafia!, Along Came a Spider, Final Jeopardy, Flashpoint, Ladder 49, Fracture, and Three Days to Vegas.

He appeared in Feast of Love (2007), co-starring Selma Blair and Morgan Freeman, and he played Detective Eric Box in the film Untraceable (2008) with Diane Lane.

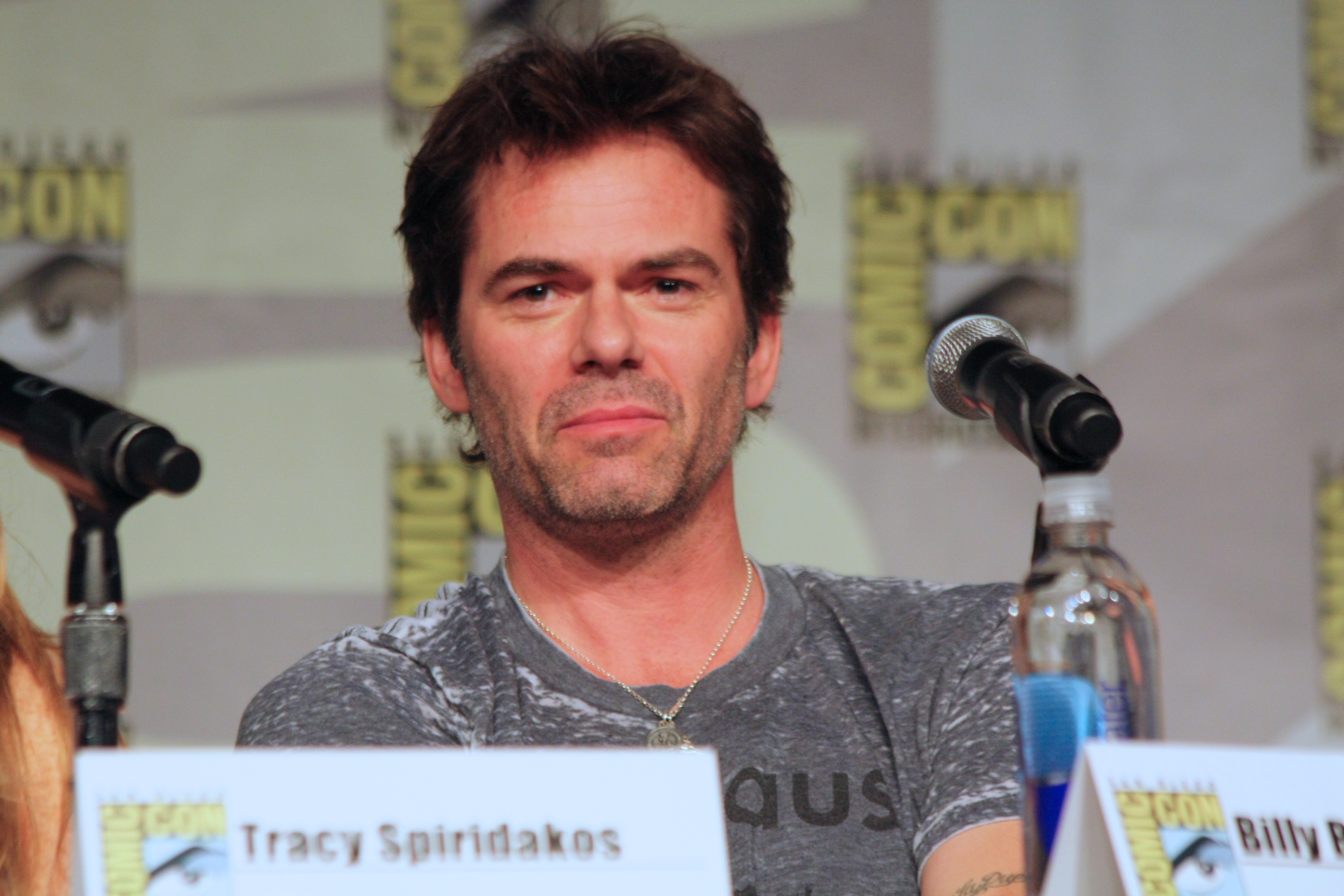
Burke at the 2013 San Diego Comic-Con.

In 2008, Burke appeared in Twilight, based on the best-selling novel by Stephenie Meyer, playing the role of Charlie Swan. He also portrayed Bobby's brother, Jack, on the show My Boys. Burke reprised his role as Charlie Swan in the Twilight sequels, New Moon, Eclipse and Breaking Dawn – Part 1 and Part 2.

In February 2010, Burke was cast as Jonah King, the primary antagonist featured in the thriller Drive Angry, which was directed by Patrick Lussier and co-starred Amber Heard, Nicolas Cage, and William Fichtner. It was released on February 25, 2011. In July 2011, Burke appeared in the TNT drama series Rizzoli & Isles.

In 2012, he was cast as the lead in the NBC science-fiction series Revolution, created by Eric Kripke and produced by J. J. Abrams. Burke reprised his role in The Closer (Season 7, episode 16, "Hostile Witness," playing the rapist and murderer, attorney Phillip Stroh). He appeared again in the series finale, "The Last Word", in a face-off against the LAPD. He returned as Phillip Stroh in a recurring role in the "Closer" spin-off Major Crimes with an ongoing impact on the show through its finale in 2018. From 2015 to 2017, Burke starred as veterinary pathologist Mitch Morgan in CBS's Zoo, based on the James Patterson novel. He has also appeared in the films Good After Bad (2017) and Breaking In (2018).

His most recent appearances on TV include shows like Chicago P.D., Most Dangerous Game, 9-1-1: Lone Star. He has recently starred in Maid, a new Netflix series created by Molly Smith Metzler and inspired by Stephanie Land's memoir "Maid: Hard Work, Low Pay, and a Mother’s Will to Survive", that premiered globally on October 1, 2021 and became one of the most watched shows in many different countries, earning several nominations at the 2022 AFI Awards, Critics Choice Awards and Golden Globes.

He has also voiced Commissioner James Gordon in the animated DC movies Batman: The Long Halloween, Part One and Part Two released in 2021. In 2022, he joined the cast of CBS TV Studios' new drama Fire Country that was picked up by CBS in May; Burke plays Vince Leone, a third-generation Cal Fire and the fire chief of the community of Edgewater, California.

In 2010, Burke released an album titled Removed. His second album, The Underkill, was released in 2018. A new single, Burn, was released on January 20, 2023 and featured in Fire Country episode 1x11 Mama Bear on the same day. Another single, History, was released on May 10, 2024, as part of Fire Country Season 2 OST; it was featured in episode 2x09 No Future, No Consequences.

== Personal life ==
He was married to actress Pollyanna Rose. They have one daughter named Bluesy who plays Charlotte Cassadine on the ABC-TV soap opera General Hospital.

== Filmography ==
=== Film ===
Year	Film	Role	Notes
1990	Daredreamer	Dante of the Three D's	
1991	To Cross the Rubicon	James Bird	
1998	Don't Look Down	Mark Engel	
1998	Without Limits	Kenny Moore	
1998	Mafia!	Joey Cortino	
1999	Komodo	Oates	
1999	Dill Scallion	Dill Scallion	
2000	The Independent	Dwayne	
2001	Along Came a Spider	Secret Service Agent Ben Devine	
2001	After Image	Sammy	
2003	Lost Junction	Jimmy McGee	
2003	Something More	Peter	
2004	Ladder 49	Dennis Gauquin	
2005	World Poker Tour	Himself	
2007	Feast of Love	David Watson	
2007	Fracture	Lt. Robert 'Rob' Nunally	
2007	Forfeit	Frank	
2007	Three Days to Vegas	Billy Simpson	
2008	Twilight	Charlie Swan	
2008	The Grift	Wade Buchanan	
2008	Untraceable	Detective Eric Box	
2009	The Twilight Saga: New Moon	Charlie Swan	
2009	Luster	Tito	
2009	Ticket Out	Dennis	
2010	The Twilight Saga: Eclipse	Charlie Swan	
2010	Removal	Eric Kershe	
2011	Drive Angry	Jonah King	
2011	Red Riding Hood	Cesaire	
2011	The Twilight Saga: Breaking Dawn – Part 1	Charlie Swan	
2012	Freaky Deaky	Chris Mankowski	
2012	The Twilight Saga: Breaking Dawn – Part 2	Charlie Swan	
2013	Angels in Stardust	The Cowboy	
2013	Highland Park	Lloyd Howard	
2015	Divine Access	Jack Harriman	
2016	Lights Out	Paul	
2017	Good After Bad	Wes	
2018	Breaking In	Eddie	
2021	Batman: The Long Halloween, Part One	James Gordon	Direct-to-video; voice role
2021	Batman: The Long Halloween, Part Two	James Gordon	Direct-to-video; voice role
2024	Outbreak	Neil Morris	
2024	Bloody Axe Wound	Roger Bladecut	

=== Television ===
Year	Series	Role	Notes
1994	Party of Five	Guy in Club	Episode: "Fathers and Sons"
1994	Star Trek: Deep Space Nine	Ari	Episode: "Second Skin"
1995	Strange Luck	—N/a	Episode: "Over Exposure"
1995	Vanishing Son	Spider McKeun	Episode: "Sweet Sixteen"
1995	All-American Girl	Cody	Episode: "Notes from the Underground"
1996	Party of Five	Gil	Episode: "Poor Substitutes"
1996	Marshal Law	Monk	Television film
1996	The Ultimate Lie	Dale	Television film
1996	Gone in the Night	Rob Kinney	Television film
1997	VR.5	Marco	Episode: "Parallel Lives"
2000	Wonderland	Dr. Abe Matthews	5 episodes
2001	Final Jeopardy	Mike Chapman	Television film
2002	Flashpoint	Shaw	Television film
2002–2003	24	Gary Matheson	7 episodes
2003	Karen Sisco	Merle Salchek	Episode: "Dumb Bunnies"
2003	Gilmore Girls	Alex Lesman	3 episodes
2004	The Jury	John Ranguso	2 episodes
2004	Monk	Brad Terry	Episode: "Mr. Monk and the T.V. Star"
2007	Law & Order	Attorney Farmer	Episode: "Charity Case"
2007	Backyards & Bullets	—N/a	Television film
2007	HBO First Look	Himself	
2008–2009	My Boys	Jack Newman	5 episodes
2008	Fringe	Lucas Vogel	Episode: "In Which We Meet Mr. Jones"
2009–2012	The Closer	Phillip Stroh	3 episodes
2010–2012	Rizzoli & Isles	Gabriel Dean	4 episodes
2012–2014	Revolution	Miles Matheson	42 episodes Nominated—Saturn Award for Best Actor on Television
2015–2018	Major Crimes	Phillip Stroh	Recurring role
2015–2017	Zoo	Dr. Mitch Morgan	39 episodes
2016	Chicago P.D.	Jake McCoy	Episode: "Some Friend"
2018	FBI	Rowan Quinn	Episode: "The Armorer's Faith"
2020–2025	9-1-1: Lone Star	Captain Billy Tyson	Recurring
2020	Most Dangerous Game	Reagan	5 episodes
2021	Maid	Hank Russell	Main role
2022–2025	Fire Country	Vince Leone	Main role (seasons 1–3)

=== Writer ===
Year	Film	Notes
2003	Something More	
2004	Dead & Breakfast	story

=== Producer ===
Year	Film	Notes
2003	Something More	Co-producer
2015	Divine Access	Co-producer
