= Zoo (Patterson novel) =

2012 novel by James Patterson and Michael Ledwidge

- First edition US cover
- Authors: James Patterson; Michael Ledwidge
- Language: English
- Genres: Thriller; Science fiction
- Published: 2012 (Little, Brown)
- Publication place: United States
- Media type: Print (hardcover)
- Pages: 395 (1st edition, hardcover)
- ISBN: 0316097446 (1st edition, hardcover)
- Followed by: Zoo 2
- Website: Official website

Zoo is a science fiction thriller novel by James Patterson and Michael Ledwidge published in September 2012. The book made it to the New York Times bestseller list. A sequel, Zoo 2, by Patterson and Max DiLallo, was released on June 7, 2016, as a novella.

== Plot ==
The novel centers on Jackson Oz, an outcast among professional and academic ecologists and biologists. Oz has tried for years to get other scientists to listen to the data he has collected on the increasing number of mammal attacks on humans. He becomes so obsessed with this goal that he quits graduate school and devotes himself to full-time data collection and arguing his case. Finally, on a trip to Botswana, he survives an attack by a large band of male lions in which about 100 people are killed over a large area. He saves the life of ecologist Chloe Tousignant. Upon returning to America, he finds his girlfriend dead in his apartment, killed and partly eaten by his pet chimpanzee.

Five years later, Oz has married Chloe and they have a son named Eli. His theory becomes accepted, as all over the world, packs of animals are entering densely populated cities and killing humans en masse. He is recruited by the US president to research the cause, but before he and his team of scientists can find an answer, the president's daughter is killed by their dog, and the military launches strikes against affected cities, which worsens the attacks. Continuing his research, Oz discovers that animal pheromones have changed due to the widespread use of radio communication (cell phones) and petroleum products (notably automobile exhaust), and these disrupted pheromones are enlarging the animals' amygdalas and causing the aggression. The US president orders all electricity, cellphone, and automobile usage banned for two weeks, and animal attacks cease nearly immediately as the ban takes effect. But after one week, people return to their previous habits, and the attacks restart with increased ferocity. Oz, his wife and son, along with some scientists and political leaders, are evacuated to Thule, Greenland, where research into how to reverse the changes will take place.

== Reviews ==
Zoo has received mixed reviews. The Hutchinson Leader says "It's a page turner that's for sure. The ending is sort of lame, but overall I enjoyed it". Bookreporter.com rates Zoo very positively, saying, "What is really chilling about Zoo is its plausibility. You may not agree with all of the points of view presented here, but at the very least it will keep you reading—and thinking—from first page to last".

== Adaptation ==
In 2015, CBS adapted the novel as the television series Zoo. It is developed by Josh Appelbaum, André Nemec, Jeff Pinkner, and Scott Rosenberg. James Wolk was the first to be cast, in November 2014, followed later the same month by Nora Arnezeder and Nonso Anozie. The main cast was rounded out in January 2015 with Kristen Connolly and Billy Burke. In February, Geoff Stults was cast in a recurring role for a "multi-episode arc". In March, Carl Lumbly was cast in a recurring role. In March 2016, Josh Salatin and Alyssa Diaz were added to the cast as series regulars in season two. In April, Joanne Kelly was cast in a recurring role. On August 10, 2016, CBS renewed the series for a third season. On October 23, 2017, CBS announced that the series was canceled.

== Sequel ==
A sequel, Zoo 2, written by James Patterson and Max DiLallo, was released on June 7, 2016, as a novella. The plot has some humans becoming infected, possibly leading to the species evolving.
