= Michael Ledwidge =

American author

Michael S. Ledwidge is an American author from Kingsbridge, Bronx in New York City. He has written several novels and is best known for his numerous collaborations with the best-selling American author James Patterson.

== Published works ==
Title	Series	Author	Year
The Narrowback	N/A	Michael Ledwidge	1999
Bad Connection	N/A	Michael Ledwidge	2001
Before the Devil Knows You're Dead	N/A	Michael Ledwidge	2002
Beach Murder (aka Beach Wedding)	N/A	Michael Ledwidge	2022
The Vault (aka The Girl in the Vault)	N/A	Michael Ledwidge	2023
Closing Time (to be released)	N/A	Michael Ledwidge	2025
Stop at Nothing	Michael Gannon	Michael Ledwidge	2020
Run for Cover	Michael Gannon	Michael Ledwidge	2021
Hard to Break	Michael Gannon	Michael Ledwidge	2023
No Safe Place	Michael Gannon	Michael Ledwidge	2024
Step on a Crack	Michael Bennett	James Patterson, Michael Ledwidge	2007
Run for Your Life	Michael Bennett	James Patterson, Michael Ledwidge	2009
Worst Case	Michael Bennett	James Patterson, Michael Ledwidge	2010
Tick Tock	Michael Bennett	James Patterson, Michael Ledwidge	2011
Gone	Michael Bennett	James Patterson, Michael Ledwidge	2011
I, Michael Bennett	Michael Bennett	James Patterson, Michael Ledwidge	2012
Burn	Michael Bennett	James Patterson, Michael Ledwidge	2014
Alert	Michael Bennett	James Patterson, Michael Ledwidge	2015
Bullseye	Michael Bennett	James Patterson, Michael Ledwidge	2016
Chase (novella)	Michael Bennett	James Patterson, Michael Ledwidge	2016
The Dangerous Days of Daniel X	Daniel X	James Patterson, Michael Ledwidge	2008
Zoo	Zoo	James Patterson, Michael Ledwidge	2012
Zoo: The Graphic Novel	Zoo	James Patterson, Michael Ledwidge	2012
The Quickie	N/A	James Patterson, Michael Ledwidge	2007
Now You See Her	N/A	James Patterson, Michael Ledwidge	2011
