= Worst Case =

2010 novel by James Patterson and Michael Ledwidge

First edition cover design (publ. Little, Brown)

Worst Case is the third book in the Michael Bennett series by James Patterson and Michael Ledwidge. It was published on February 1, 2010, by Little, Brown and Company.

== Plot ==
NYPD Detective Mike Bennett and his new partner FBI Special Agent Emily Parker are on the trail of Francis Mooney, a Manhattan trusts and estates lawyer with terminal lung cancer. Faced with his mortality, he realizes he has spent his life and career helping the rich pass along monetary possessions to children who have neither the intelligence nor maturity to use those possessions in a way that helps society at large.

To remedy this, Mooney begins kidnapping the teenage children of the rich and putting the children through a test in which he asks them questions to test their social awareness. For example, he asks one teen what his childhood nanny's first and last name and what country she was from. When the teenager doesn't answer correctly, Mooney kills him. However, when Mooney kidnaps another teen who does answer her questions correctly, he lets her go unharmed. Mooney had expected to have to kill the teen as well and did not wear a mask over his face. He also left a fingerprint on the teen's forehead.

From that fingerprint and the teen's description, Bennett and Parker are able to identify Mooney. By that time, Mooney has returned to his old high school where he has taken several male students hostage in an auditorium. Bennett and Parker respond, but Mooney is able to escape in a stolen taxicab with 2 male students as hostages. After leaving the school, Mooney also takes the teenage doorman from a nearby swanky hotel hostage as well. Mooney wires his hostages and himself with explosives so that any attempt to kill him would kill the hostages as well.

Mooney takes his hostages to the place he feels epitomizes all the greed and monetary obsession that troubles him: the New York Stock Exchange. The police have the Exchange surrounded and the Exchange's Chief of Security attempts to apprehend Mooney. Mooney's teenage doorman hostage happens to be the son of the Exchange's chief of security and rather than shoot his own son, the chief lets Mooney by.

Once inside, Mooney reveals that the fathers of each of the two student hostages from the high school are very wealthy. He demands that the fathers both come to the Exchange and swap places with their sons. Bennett and Parker arrive and hatch a plan. Parker engages Mooney in a discussion where she belittles and trivializes all of the factors motivating Mooney. While she has Mooney distracted, Bennett engages Mooney in another discussion from the opposite side. Bennett convinces Mooney that the fathers of his hostages have arrived and are coming up the stairs as they speak. Mooney moves towards the stairway to verify this and is shot in the wrists by an FBI sniper stationed across the street. Unable to detonate his explosives with his hands, Mooney tries to do so with his chin and is shot in the head by the sniper.

== Reception ==
A review from Publishers Weekly praised the character Emily as having "an appealing gentleness", but criticised the other female characters as clichéd. The Journal Gazette described the book as a "fast read" with superior plot compared to other books by Patterson.
