= 2011–12 United States network television schedule (daytime) =

The 2011–12 daytime network television schedule for four of the five major English-language commercial broadcast networks in the United States covers the weekday daytime hours from September 2011 to August 2012. The schedule is followed by a list per network of returning series, and any series canceled after the 2010–11 season.

Affiliates fill time periods not occupied by network programs with local or syndicated programming. PBS – which offers daytime programming through a children's program block, PBS Kids – is not included, as its member television stations have local flexibility over most of their schedules and broadcast times for network shows may vary. Also not included are stations affiliated with Fox (as the network does not air a daytime network schedule or network news expect on Sundays), The CW Plus and MyNetworkTV (as the programming services also do not offer daytime programs of any kind), and Ion Television (which only supplies programming from their Qubo block as its schedule is composed mainly of syndicated reruns).

== Legend ==
- Light yellow indicates talk shows.
- Green indicates soap operas.
- Pink indicates game shows.
- Gold indicates news programming.
- White indicates local programming.
- Gray indicates encore programming (e.g., reruns of prime-time programming).
- Light teal indicates sporting events.
- Light purple indicates children's programming.
- Light blue indicates other programs not applicable to the above categorizations.

== Schedule ==
- New series are highlighted in **bold**.
- All times correspond to U.S. Eastern and Pacific Time scheduling (except for some live sports or events). Except where affiliates slot certain programs outside their network-dictated timeslots, subtract one hour for Central, Mountain, Alaska, and Hawaii–Aleutian times.
- Local schedules may differ, as affiliates have the option to pre-empt or delay network programs. Such scheduling may be limited to preemptions caused by local or national breaking news or weather coverage (which may force stations to tape delay certain programs in overnight timeslots or defer them to a co-operated station or digital subchannel in their regular timeslot) and any major sports events scheduled to air in a weekday timeslot (mainly during major holidays). Stations may air shows at other times at their preference.

=== Monday-Friday ===
Network		7:00 am	7:30 am	8:00 am	8:30 am	9:00 am	9:30 am	10:00 am	10:30 am	11:00 am	11:30 am	noon	12:30 pm	1:00 pm	1:30 pm	2:00 pm	2:30 pm	3:00 pm	3:30 pm	4:00 pm	4:30 pm	5:00 pm	5:30 pm	6:00 pm	6:30 pm
ABC	Fall	Good Morning America				Local and/or syndicated programming				The View		Local and/or syndicated programming		**The Chew**		One Life to Live		General Hospital		Local and/or syndicated programming					ABC World News with Diane Sawyer
ABC	Winter	Good Morning America				Local and/or syndicated programming				The View		Local and/or syndicated programming		**The Chew**		**The Revolution**		General Hospital		Local and/or syndicated programming					ABC World News with Diane Sawyer
ABC	Summer	Good Morning America				Local and/or syndicated programming				The View		Local and/or syndicated programming		**The Chew**		**Good Afternoon America**		General Hospital		Local and/or syndicated programming					ABC World News with Diane Sawyer
CBS	Fall	The Early Show				Local and/or syndicated programming		Let's Make a Deal		The Price Is Right		Local and/or syndicated programming	The Young and the Restless		The Bold and the Beautiful	The Talk		Local and/or syndicated programming							CBS Evening News with Scott Pelley
CBS	Winter	CBS This Morning				Local and/or syndicated programming		Let's Make a Deal		The Price Is Right		Local and/or syndicated programming	The Young and the Restless		The Bold and the Beautiful	The Talk		Local and/or syndicated programming							CBS Evening News with Scott Pelley
NBC		Today								Local and/or syndicated programming				Days of Our Lives		Local and/or syndicated programming									NBC Nightly News with Brian Williams
CW	Fall	Local and/or syndicated programming																Dr. Drew's Lifechangers	Dr. Drew's Lifechangers (R)	Local and/or syndicated programming					
CW	Summer	Local and/or syndicated programming																Dr. Drew's Lifechangers (R)	Dr. Drew's Lifechangers (R)	Local and/or syndicated programming					

- Note: After Good Afternoon America aired its final broadcast on September 7, ABC turned the 3:00 p.m. ET hour over to its owned-and-operated stations and affiliates to accommodate syndicated programming.

=== Saturday ===
Network		7:00 am	7:30 am	8:00 am	8:30 am	9:00 am	9:30 am	10:00 am	10:30 am	11:00 am	11:30 am	noon	12:30 pm	1:00 pm	1:30 pm	2:00 pm	2:30 pm	3:00 pm	3:30 pm	4:00 pm	4:30 pm	5:00 pm	5:30 pm	6:00 pm	6:30 pm
ABC	Fall	Good Morning America		Local and/or syndicated programming				**Jack Hanna's Wild Countdown**	**Ocean Mysteries with Jeff Corwin**	**Born to Explore with Richard Wiese**	**Culture Click**	**Everyday Health**	**Food for Thought with Claire Thomas**	ESPN College Football on ABC											
ABC	Winter	Good Morning America		Local and/or syndicated programming				**Jack Hanna's Wild Countdown**	**Ocean Mysteries with Jeff Corwin**	**Born to Explore with Richard Wiese**	**Culture Click**	**Everyday Health**	**Food for Thought with Claire Thomas**	ESPN on ABC and/or local programming				ESPN on ABC programming						Local news	ABC World News Saturday
ABC	Spring	Good Morning America		Local and/or syndicated programming				**Jack Hanna's Wild Countdown**	**Ocean Mysteries with Jeff Corwin**	**Born to Explore with Richard Wiese**	**Sea Rescue**	**Everyday Health**	**Food for Thought with Claire Thomas**	ESPN on ABC and/or local programming				ESPN on ABC programming						Local news	ABC World News Saturday
CBS	Fall	The Saturday Early Show				**Danger Rangers**	Horseland (R)	**The Doodlebops**		Busytown Mysteries (R)		SEC on CBS													
CBS	Winter	**CBS This Morning Saturday**				**Danger Rangers**	Horseland (R)	**The Doodlebops**		Busytown Mysteries (R)		CBS Sports and/or local programming						CBS Sports programming						Local news	CBS Evening News
NBC	Fall	Weekend Today				Local and/or syndicated programming		Turbo Dogs (R)	Shelldon	The Magic School Bus (R)	Babar (R)	Willa's Wild Life (R)	Pearlie (R)	NBC Sports and/or local programming				NBC Sports programming						Local news	NBC Nightly News with Lester Holt
NBC	January	Weekend Today				Local and/or syndicated programming		The Zula Patrol (R)	Shelldon	Jane and the Dragon (R)	Babar (R)	Willa's Wild Life (R)	Pearlie (R)	NBC Sports and/or local programming				NBC Sports programming						Local news	NBC Nightly News with Lester Holt
NBC	July	Weekend Today				Local and/or syndicated programming		**Noodle and Doodle**	**Pajanimals**	**Poppy Cat**	**Justin Time**	LazyTown	**The Wiggles**	NBC Sports and/or local programming				NBC Sports programming						Local news	NBC Nightly News with Lester Holt
FOX	Fall	Local and/or syndicated programming						Weekend Marketplace				Fox Sports and/or local programming													
FOX	April	Local and/or syndicated programming						Weekend Marketplace				**MLB Player Poll**	Fox Sports and/or local programming												
The CW	Fall	Magi-Nation		Sonic X (R)		Yu-Gi-Oh! (R)	Sonic X (R)	Dragon Ball Z Kai		**Tai Chi Chasers**	Yu-Gi-Oh! (R)	Local and/or syndicated programming													
The CW	October	Magi-Nation		Sonic X (R)		Yu-Gi-Oh! (R)	**Yu-Gi-Oh! Zexal**	Dragon Ball Z Kai		**Tai Chi Chasers**	Yu-Gi-Oh! (R)	Local and/or syndicated programming													
The CW	February	Cubix: Robots for Everyone (R)		Sonic X (R)		Yu-Gi-Oh! Zexal	Yu-Gi-Oh! (R)	Dragon Ball Z Kai		**Tai Chi Chasers**	Yu-Gi-Oh! (R)	Local and/or syndicated programming													
The CW	Spring	Cubix: Robots for Everyone (R)		Sonic X (R)		Yu-Gi-Oh! Zexal	Yu-Gi-Oh! Capsule Monsters (R)	Dragon Ball Z Kai		**Tai Chi Chasers**	Yu-Gi-Oh! Capsule Monsters (R)	Local and/or syndicated programming													
The CW	May	Cubix: Robots for Everyone (R)		Sonic X (R)		Yu-Gi-Oh! Zexal	Yu-Gi-Oh! (R)	Dragon Ball Z Kai		**Tai Chi Chasers**	Yu-Gi-Oh! (R)	Local and/or syndicated programming													
The CW	Summer	Cubix: Robots for Everyone (R)		Sonic X (R)		Yu-Gi-Oh! Zexal		Dragon Ball Z Kai		Yu-Gi-Oh! (R)		Local and/or syndicated programming													
The CW	July	Cubix: Robots for Everyone (R)		Sonic X (R)		Yu-Gi-Oh! Zexal		Dragon Ball Z Kai			Yu-Gi-Oh! (R)	Local and/or syndicated programming													

=== Sunday ===
Network		7:00 am	7:30 am	8:00 am	8:30 am	9:00 am	9:30 am	10:00 am	10:30 am	11:00 am	11:30 am	noon	12:30 pm	1:00 pm	1:30 pm	2:00 pm	2:30 pm	3:00 pm	3:30 pm	4:00 pm	4:30 pm	5:00 pm	5:30 pm	6:00 pm	6:30 pm
ABC		Local and/or syndicated programming		Good Morning America		Local and/or syndicated programming		This Week		ESPN on ABC and/or local programming														Local news	ABC World News Sunday
CBS	Fall	Local and/or syndicated programming				CBS News Sunday Morning			Face the Nation	Local and/or syndicated programming		NFL Today		NFL on CBS											
CBS	Mid-winter	Local and/or syndicated programming				CBS News Sunday Morning			Face the Nation		Local and/or syndicated programming	CBS Sports and/or local programming												Local news	CBS Evening News
NBC		Local and/or syndicated programming		Weekend Today		Meet the Press		Local and/or syndicated programming				NBC Sports and/or local programming												Local news	NBC Nightly News with Lester Holt
FOX	Fall	Local and/or syndicated programming				Fox News Sunday		Local and/or syndicated programming				Fox NFL Sunday		Fox NFL (and sometimes local programming)											
FOX	Mid-winter	Local and/or syndicated programming				Fox News Sunday		Local and/or syndicated programming				Fox Sports and/or local programming												Local and/or syndicated programming	

== By network ==
=== ABC ===
Returning series:

- ABC World News
- General Hospital
- Good Morning America
- One Life to Live
- The View
- This Week

New series:

- The Chew
- Good Afternoon America
- The Revolution
- Litton's Weekend Adventure
  - Jack Hanna's Wild Countdown
  - Ocean Mysteries with Jeff Corwin
  - Born to Explore with Richard Wiese
  - Culture Click
  - Everyday Health
  - Food for Thought with Claire Thomas
  - Sea Rescue

Not returning from 2010–11:

- All My Children
- ABC Kids
  - The Emperor's New School (reruns)
  - Hannah Montana (reruns)
  - The Replacements (reruns)
  - The Suite Life of Zack and Cody (reruns)
  - That's So Raven (reruns)

=== CBS ===
Returning series:

- The Bold and the Beautiful
- CBS Evening News
- CBS News Sunday Morning
- The Early Show
- Face the Nation
- Let's Make a Deal
- The Price Is Right
- The Talk
- The Young and the Restless
- Cookie Jar TV
  - Busytown Mysteries (reruns)
  - Horseland (reruns)

New series:

- CBS This Morning
- Cookie Jar TV
  - Danger Rangers
  - The Doodlebops

Not returning from 2010-11:

- Cookie Jar TV
  - Doodlebops Rockin’ Road Show
  - Sabrina's Secret Life
  - Sabrina: The Animated Series (reruns)
  - Trollz (reruns)

=== The CW ===
Returning series:

- Toonzai/The CW4Kids
  - Cubix: Robots for Everyone (reruns)
  - Dragon Ball Z Kai
  - Magi-Nation
  - Sonic X (reruns)
  - Yu-Gi-Oh! (reruns)
  - Yu-Gi-Oh! Capsule Monsters (reruns)

New series:

- Dr. Drew's Lifechangers
- Toonzai/The CW4Kids
  - Tai Chi Chasers
  - Yu-Gi-Oh! Zexal

Not returning from 2010–11:

- The Tyra Banks Show
- Toonzai/The CW4Kids
  - Dinosaur King (reruns)
  - Yu-Gi-Oh! 5D's

=== FOX ===
Returning series:

- Fox News Sunday
- Fox Sports
  - Fox NFL
  - Fox NFL Sunday
- Weekend Marketplace

New series:

- MLB Player Poll

Not returning from 2010-11:

- This Week In Baseball

=== NBC ===
Returning series:

- Days of Our Lives
- Meet the Press
- NBC Nightly News
- Today with Matt Lauer and Ann Curry / Savannah Guthrie
- Qubo (shared with Ion Television and Telemundo, ending June 30)
  - Babar (reruns)
  - Jane and the Dragon (reruns)
  - The Magic School Bus (reruns)
  - Pearlie (reruns)
  - Shelldon
  - Turbo Dogs (reruns)
  - Willa's Wild Life (reruns)
  - The Zula Patrol (reruns)

New series:

- NBC Kids (starting July 7)
  - Noodle and Doodle
  - Pajanimals
  - Poppy Cat
  - Justin Time
  - LazyTown
  - The Wiggles

== Renewals and cancellations ==
=== Renewals ===
==== ABC ====
- General Hospital—Renewed for a 50th season on April 11, 2012.

==== CBS ====
- The Young and the Restless—Renewed for three additional seasons (encompassing the series' 38th, 39th and 40th seasons) on November 29, 2010.
- The Bold and the Beautiful—Renewed for two additional seasons (encompassing the series' 48th and 49th seasons) on November 29, 2010.
- The Talk—Renewed for a third season on November 29, 2010.

==== NBC ====
- Days of Our Lives—Renewed for two seasons (encompassing the series' 46th and 47th seasons) on November 7, 2010.

=== Cancellations/series endings ===
==== ABC ====
- One Life to Live—Canceled after 43 years on April 14, 2011; the series concluded its ABC run January 13, 2012.
- The Revolution—Canceled on April 11, 2012; the series concluded on July 6, 2012.

==== The CW ====
- Dr. Drew's Lifechangers—Canceled on February 10, 2012; the series concluded on May 11, 2012.

== See also ==
- 2011–12 United States network television schedule (prime-time)
- 2011–12 United States network television schedule (late night)

== Sources ==
- Curt Alliaume. "ABC Daytime Schedule". Curt Alliaume’s Utterly Irrelevant Web Site. Archived from the original on October 15, 2007.
- Curt Alliaume. "CBS Daytime Schedule". Curt Alliaume’s Utterly Irrelevant Web Site. Archived from the original on October 15, 2007.
- Curt Alliaume. "NBC Daytime Schedule". Curt Alliaume’s Utterly Irrelevant Web Site. Archived from the original on October 12, 2007.
