= 2009–10 United States network television schedule (daytime) =

The 2009–10 daytime network television schedule for four of the five major English-language commercial broadcast networks in the United States covers the weekday daytime hours from September 2009 to August 2010. The schedule is followed by a list per network of returning series, and any series canceled after the 2008–09 season.

Affiliates fill time periods not occupied by network programs with local or syndicated programming. PBS – which offers daytime programming through a children's program block, PBS Kids – is not included, as its member television stations have local flexibility over most of their schedules and broadcast times for network shows may vary. Also not included are stations affiliated with Fox, MyNetworkTV, and The CW Plus, as the former network and the latter programming services did not offer (and continues not to offer) a daytime network schedule or network news, and Ion Television, as its schedule was composed mainly of programming from its Qubo block and syndicated reruns at the time.

== Legend ==
- Light yellow indicates talk shows.
- Green indicates soap operas.
- Pink indicates game shows.
- Gold indicates news programming.
- White indicates local programming.
- Gray indicates encore programming (e.g., reruns of prime-time programming).
- Light blue indicates other programs not applicable to the above categorizations.
- New series are highlighted in **bold**.

== Schedule ==
- All times correspond to U.S. Eastern and Pacific Time scheduling (except for some live sports or events). Except where affiliates slot certain programs outside their network-dictated timeslots, subtract one hour for Central, Mountain, Alaska, and Hawaii–Aleutian times.
- Local schedules may differ, as affiliates have the option to pre-empt or delay network programs. Such scheduling may be limited to preemptions caused by local or national breaking news or weather coverage (which may force stations to tape delay certain programs in overnight timeslots or defer them to a co-operated station or digital subchannel in their regular timeslot) and any major sports events scheduled to air in a weekday timeslot (mainly during major holidays). Stations may air shows at other times at their preference.

=== Monday-Friday ===
Network		7:00 am	7:30 am	8:00 am	8:30 am	9:00 am	9:30 am	10:00 am	10:30 am	11:00 am	11:30 am	noon	12:30 pm	1:00 pm	1:30 pm	2:00 pm	2:30 pm	3:00 pm	3:30 pm	4:00 pm	4:30 pm	5:00 pm	5:30 pm	6:00 pm	6:30 pm
ABC	Fall	Good Morning America				Local and/or syndicated programming				The View		Local and/or syndicated programming		All My Children		One Life to Live		General Hospital		Local and/or syndicated programming					ABC World News with Charles Gibson
ABC	Winter	Good Morning America				Local and/or syndicated programming				The View		Local and/or syndicated programming		All My Children		One Life to Live		General Hospital		Local and/or syndicated programming					ABC World News with Diane Sawyer
CBS		The Early Show				Local and/or syndicated programming		**Let's Make a Deal**^{†}		The Price Is Right		Local and/or syndicated programming	The Young and the Restless		The Bold and the Beautiful	As the World Turns		Local and/or syndicated programming							CBS Evening News with Katie Couric
NBC		Today								Local and/or syndicated programming				Days of Our Lives		Local and/or syndicated programming									NBC Nightly News with Brian Williams
CW		Local and/or syndicated programming																		The Tyra Banks Show (R)		The Tyra Banks Show		Local and/or syndicated programming	

Notes:

- ABC, NBC and CBS offer their early morning newscasts via a looping feed (usually running as late as 10:00 a.m. Pacific Time) to accommodate local scheduling in the westernmost contiguous time zones or for use a filler programming for stations that do not offer a local morning newscast; some stations without a morning newscast may air syndicated or time-lease programs instead of the full newscast loop.
- (†) Many CBS affiliates returned the 3:00 p.m. ET timeslot to their affiliates starting September 21, although some stations continue to air Let's Make a Deal during the 3:00 p.m. hour to this day. In the two weeks preceding the October 5 debut of Let's Make a Deal, to fill a gap in the schedule caused by the discontinuance of Guiding Light, CBS aired repeats of The Price is Right in the timeslot.

=== Saturday ===
Network		7:00 am	7:30 am	8:00 am	8:30 am	9:00 am	9:30 am	10:00 am	10:30 am	11:00 am	11:30 am	noon	12:30 pm	1:00 pm	1:30 pm	2:00 pm	2:30 pm	3:00 pm	3:30 pm	4:00 pm	4:30 pm	5:00 pm	5:30 pm	6:00 pm	6:30 pm
ABC	Fall	Local and/or syndicated programming		Good Morning America		The Emperor's New School (R)	The Replacements (R)	That's So Raven (R)		Hannah Montana (R)	The Suite Life of Zack and Cody (R)	Power Rangers RPM		College Football on ABC											
ABC	Winter	Local and/or syndicated programming		Good Morning America		The Emperor's New School (R)	The Replacements (R)	That's So Raven (R)		Hannah Montana (R)	The Suite Life of Zack and Cody (R)	Mighty Morphin Power Rangers (re-version)		ABC Sports and/or local programming				ABC Sports programming						Local news	ABC World News Saturday
CBS	Fall	**Busytown Mysteries**	**Noonbory and the Super Seven**	**Busytown Mysteries**	Sabrina: The Animated Series (R)	The Saturday Early Show				**Busytown Mysteries**	**Noonbory and the Super Seven**	SEC on CBS													
CBS	Winter	**Busytown Mysteries**	**Noonbory and the Super Seven**	**Busytown Mysteries**	Sabrina: The Animated Series (R)	The Saturday Early Show				**Busytown Mysteries**	**Noonbory and the Super Seven**	CBS Sports and/or local programming						CBS Sports programming						Local news	CBS Evening News
CBS	Spring	Noonbory and the Super Seven	Busytown Mysteries	**Doodlebops Rockin' Road Show**	Strawberry Shortcake	The Saturday Early Show				Sabrina: The Animated Series (R)		CBS Sports and/or local programming						CBS Sports programming						Local news	CBS Evening News
NBC
NBC	Fall	Local and/or syndicated programming		Today				The Zula Patrol	My Friend Rabbit (R)	**Willa's Wild Life**	Babar (R)	Jacob Two-Two	Jane and the Dragon (R)	NBC Sports and/or local programming				NBC Sports programming						Local news	NBC Nightly News
NBC	October	Local and/or syndicated programming		Today				The Zula Patrol	My Friend Rabbit (R)	**Willa's Wild Life**	Babar (R)	**Shelldon**	Jane and the Dragon (R)	NBC Sports and/or local programming				NBC Sports programming						Local news	NBC Nightly News
NBC	Winter	Local and/or syndicated programming		Today				Turbo Dogs	Shelldon	3-2-1 Penguins! (R)	Babar (R)	Willa's Wild Life	Jane and the Dragon (R)	NBC Sports and/or local programming				NBC Sports programming						Local news	NBC Nightly News
Fox	Fall	Local and/or syndicated programming						Weekend Marketplace				Fox Sports and/or local programming													
Fox	April	Local and/or syndicated programming						Weekend Marketplace				This Week in Baseball	Fox Sports and/or local programming												
The CW	Fall	GoGoRiki	Winx Club (R)	**Rollbots**	Dinosaur King	Yu-Gi-Oh!	Sonic X (R)		Teenage Mutant Ninja Turtles	Chaotic	Kamen Rider: Dragon Knight	Local and/or syndicated programming													
The CW	November	Winx Club (R)		**Rollbots**	Dinosaur King	Yu-Gi-Oh!	Sonic X (R)		Teenage Mutant Ninja Turtles	Chaotic	Kamen Rider: Dragon Knight	Local and/or syndicated programming													
The CW	December	Winx Club (R)		Huntik: Secrets & Seekers (R)	Dinosaur King	Yu-Gi-Oh!	Sonic X (R)		Teenage Mutant Ninja Turtles	Chaotic	Kamen Rider: Dragon Knight	Local and/or syndicated programming													
The CW	January	Winx Club (R)		Rollbots	Dinosaur King	Yu-Gi-Oh!		Sonic X (R)		Teenage Mutant Ninja Turtles	Chaotic	Local and/or syndicated programming													
The CW	March	Winx Club (R)		Dinosaur King		Yu-Gi-Oh!		Sonic X (R)		Teenage Mutant Ninja Turtles		Local and/or syndicated programming													
The CW	May	Magical DoReMi (R)	Winx Club (R)	Dinosaur King		Teenage Mutant Ninja Turtles (R)		Sonic X (R)		Yu-Gi-Oh! (R)		Local and/or syndicated programming													
The CW	June	Magical DoReMi (R)	Winx Club (R)	Dinosaur King (R)	Skunk Fu!	Teenage Mutant Ninja Turtles (R)		Sonic X (R)	Chaotic (R)	Yu-Gi-Oh! 5D's		Local and/or syndicated programming													
The CW	July	Cubix: Robots for Everyone (R)		Sonic X (R)		Teenage Mutant Ninja Turtles (R)		Sonic X (R)	Yu-Gi-Oh! 5D's		Dinosaur King (R)	Local and/or syndicated programming													
The CW	August	Cubix: Robots for Everyone (R)		Sonic X (R)		Teenage Mutant Ninja Turtles (R)		**Dragon Ball Z Kai**	Yu-Gi-Oh! 5D's		Dinosaur King (R)	Local and/or syndicated programming													

=== Sunday ===
Network		7:00 am	7:30 am	8:00 am	8:30 am	9:00 am	9:30 am	10:00 am	10:30 am	11:00 am	11:30 am	noon	12:30 pm	1:00 pm	1:30 pm	2:00 pm	2:30 pm	3:00 pm	3:30 pm	4:00 pm	4:30 pm	5:00 pm	5:30 pm	6:00 pm	6:30 pm
ABC		Good Morning America		Local and/or syndicated programming		This Week		Local and/or syndicated programming		ABC Sports and/or local programming														Local news	ABC World News Sunday
CBS	Fall	Local and/or syndicated programming				CBS News Sunday Morning			Face the Nation	Local and/or syndicated programming		NFL Today		NFL on CBS											
CBS	Mid-winter	Local and/or syndicated programming				CBS News Sunday Morning			Face the Nation	Local and/or syndicated programming		CBS Sports and/or local programming												Local news	CBS Evening News
NBC		Local and/or syndicated programming		Today		Meet the Press		Local and/or syndicated programming				NBC Sports and/or local programming												Local news	NBC Nightly News
Fox	Fall	Local and/or syndicated programming				Fox News Sunday		Local and/or syndicated programming				Fox NFL Sunday		Fox NFL (and sometimes local programming)											
Fox	Mid-winter	Local and/or syndicated programming				Fox News Sunday		Local and/or syndicated programming				Fox Sports and/or local programming												Local and/or syndicated programming	

== By network ==
=== ABC ===
Returning series:

- ABC World News
- All My Children
- America This Morning
- General Hospital
- Good Morning America
- One Life to Live
- The View
- This Week
- ABC Kids
  - The Emperor's New School (reruns)
  - Hannah Montana (reruns)
  - Power Rangers RPM
  - The Replacements (reruns)
  - The Suite Life of Zack and Cody (reruns)
  - That's So Raven (reruns)

New series:

- ABC Kids
  - Mighty Morphin Power Rangers (re-version)

Not returning from 2008–09:

- ABC Kids
  - Power Rangers Jungle Fury

=== CBS ===
Returning series:

- As the World Turns
- The Bold and the Beautiful
- CBS Evening News
- CBS Morning News
- The Early Show
- The Price Is Right
- The Young and the Restless
- Cookie Jar TV
  - Sabrina: The Animated Series (reruns)
  - Strawberry Shortcake

New series:

- **Let's Make a Deal**
- Cookie Jar TV
  - **Busytown Mysteries**
  - **Noonbory and the Super Seven**
  - **Doodlebops Rockin' Road Show**

Not returning from 2008–09:

- Guiding Light
- KEWLopolis
  - Cake (reruns)
  - Care Bears: Adventures in Care-a-lot
  - Dino Squad
  - Horseland
  - Sushi Pack

=== The CW ===
Returning series:

- The CW4Kids
  - Chaotic
  - Dinosaur King
  - GoGoRiki
  - Huntik: Secrets & Seekers (reruns)
  - Kamen Rider: Dragon Knight
  - Skunk Fu!
  - Sonic X (reruns)
  - Teenage Mutant Ninja Turtles
  - Winx Club (reruns)
  - Yu-Gi-Oh! 5D's

New series:

- **The Tyra Banks Show** (moved from first-run syndication)
- The CW4Kids
  - **Rollbots**
  - **Dragon Ball Z Kai**
  - Yu-Gi-Oh! (reruns)

Not returning from 2008–09:

- 4Real
- The Drew Carey Show (reruns)
- Everybody Hates Chris
- The Game
- In Harm's Way
- The Jamie Foxx Show (reruns)
- Judge Jeanine Pirro
- Valentine
- The Wayans Bros. (reruns)
- The CW4Kids
  - Kirby: Right Back at Ya! (reruns)
  - Viva Piñata
  - The Spectacular Spider-Man (continues on Disney XD)
  - Will & Dewitt

=== Fox ===
Returning series:

- Fox News Sunday
- This Week in Baseball
- Weekend Marketplace

Not returning from 2008–09:

- 4Kids TV
  - Biker Mice from Mars
  - Chaotic
  - Di-Gata Defenders
  - Kirby: Right Back at Ya! (reruns)
  - Sonic X (reruns)
  - Winx Club (reruns)

=== NBC ===
Returning series:

- Days of Our Lives
- Early Today
- NBC Nightly News
- Today
- Qubo
  - 3-2-1 Penguins! (reruns)
  - Babar (reruns)
  - Jacob Two-Two
  - Jane and the Dragon (reruns)
  - My Friend Rabbit (reruns)
  - Turbo Dogs
  - The Zula Patrol

New series:

- Qubo
  - **Shelldon**
  - **Willa's Wild Life**

Not returning from 2008–09:

- Qubo
  - VeggieTales

== Renewals and cancellations ==
=== Cancellations/series endings ===
==== CBS ====
- As the World Turns—Canceled after 54 years on December 8, 2009; the series concluded its CBS run on September 17, 2010.

== See also ==
- 2009–10 United States network television schedule (prime-time)
- 2009–10 United States network television schedule (late night)

== Sources ==
- Curt Alliaume. "ABC Daytime Schedule". Curt Alliaume’s Utterly Irrelevant Web Site. Archived from the original on October 15, 2007.
- Curt Alliaume. "CBS Daytime Schedule". Curt Alliaume’s Utterly Irrelevant Web Site. Archived from the original on October 15, 2007.
- Curt Alliaume. "NBC Daytime Schedule". Curt Alliaume’s Utterly Irrelevant Web Site. Archived from the original on October 12, 2007.
