= 2008–09 United States network television schedule (daytime) =

The 2008–09 daytime network television schedule for the five major English-language commercial broadcast networks in the United States covers the weekday and weekend afternoon hours from September 2008 to August 2009. The schedule is followed by a list per network of returning and cancelled shows from the 2007–08 season.

Affiliates fill time periods not occupied by network programs with local or syndicated programming. PBS – which offers daytime programming through a children's program block, PBS Kids – is not included, as its member television stations have local flexibility over most of their schedules and broadcast times for network shows may vary. Also not included are MyNetworkTV and The CW Plus (as the former network and the latter programming service don't offer daytime programs of any kind), and Ion Television (which only supplies programming from their Qubo block as its schedule is composed mainly of syndicated reruns). Fox is not included on the weekday schedule: Fox only airs daytime programming (in the form of sports on weekend afternoons).

== Legend ==
- Light blue indicates local programming.
- Gray indicates encore programming.
- Yellow indicates talk shows.
- Pink indicates game shows.
- Chartreuse indicates soap operas.
- Blue-gray indicates news programming.
- Light green indicates sporting events.
- Light purple indicates children's and/or E/I-compliant programming.
- Light teal indicates programs not applicable to the above categorizations.

== Schedule ==
- New series are highlighted in **bold**.
- All times correspond to U.S. Eastern and Pacific Time (select shows) scheduling (except for some live sports or events). Except where affiliates slot certain programs outside their network-dictated timeslots, subtract one hour for Central, Mountain, Pacific (for selected shows), Alaska, and Hawaii-Aleutian times.
- Local schedules may differ, as affiliates have the option to pre-empt or delay network programs. Such scheduling may be limited to preemptions caused by local or national breaking news or weather coverage (which may force stations to tape delay certain programs in overnight timeslots or defer them to a co-operated station or digital subchannel in their regular timeslot) and any major sports events scheduled to air in a weekday timeslot (mainly during major holidays). Stations may air shows at other times at their preference.
- All sporting events air live in all time zones in U.S. Eastern time, with local and/or primetime programming after game completion.

=== Weekdays ===
Network	6:00 a.m.	6:30 a.m.	7:00 a.m.	7:30 a.m.	8:00 a.m.	8:30 a.m.	9:00 a.m.	9:30 a.m.	10:00 a.m.	10:30 a.m.	11:00 a.m.	11:30 a.m.	Noon	12:30 p.m.	1:00 p.m.	1:30 p.m.	2:00 p.m.	2:30 p.m.	3:00 p.m.	3:30 p.m.	4:00 p.m.	4:30 p.m.	5:00 p.m.	5:30 p.m.	6:00 p.m.	6:30 p.m.	7:00 p.m.	7:30 p.m.
ABC	Local and/or syndicated programming		Good Morning America				Local and/or syndicated programming				The View		Local and/or syndicated programming		All My Children		One Life to Live		General Hospital		Local and/or syndicated programming					ABC World News Tonight with Charles Gibson	Local and/or syndicated programming	
CBS	Local and/or syndicated programming		The Early Show				Local and/or syndicated programming				The Price Is Right		Local and/or syndicated programming	The Young and the Restless		The Bold and the Beautiful	As the World Turns		Guiding Light		Local and/or syndicated programming					CBS Evening News with Katie Couric	Local and/or syndicated programming	
NBC	Local and/or syndicated programming		Today								Local and/or syndicated programming				Days of Our Lives		Local and/or syndicated programming									NBC Nightly News with Brian Williams	Local and/or syndicated programming	
The CW	Local and/or syndicated programming																				**Judge Jeanine Pirro**		The Jamie Foxx Show (R)	The Wayans Bros. (R)	Local and/or syndicated programming			

=== Saturday ===
Network		6:00 a.m.	6:30 a.m.	7:00 a.m.	7:30 a.m.	8:00 a.m.	8:30 a.m.	9:00 a.m.	9:30 a.m.	10:00 a.m.	10:30 a.m.	11:00 a.m.	11:30 a.m.	Noon	12:30 p.m.	1:00 p.m.	1:30 p.m.	2:00 p.m.	2:30 p.m.	3:00 p.m.	3:30 p.m.	4:00 p.m.	4:30 p.m.	5:00 p.m.	5:30 p.m.	6:00 p.m.	6:30 p.m.	7:00 p.m.	7:30 p.m.
ABC	Fall	Local and/or syndicated programming				Good Morning America		The Emperor's New School (R)	The Replacements (R)	That's So Raven (R)		Hannah Montana (R)	The Suite Life of Zack and Cody (R)	Power Rangers Jungle Fury		ESPN College Football on ABC													College Football Scoreboard
ABC	Winter	Local and/or syndicated programming				Good Morning America		The Emperor's New School (R)	The Replacements (R)	That's So Raven (R)		Hannah Montana (R)	The Suite Life of Zack and Cody (R)	Power Rangers Jungle Fury		Local, syndicated and/or ESPN on ABC sports programming										Local and/or syndicated programming	ABC World News Tonight	Local and/or syndicated programming	
ABC	Spring	Local and/or syndicated programming				Good Morning America		The Emperor's New School (R)	The Replacements (R)	That's So Raven (R)		Hannah Montana (R)	The Suite Life of Zack and Cody (R)	**Power Rangers RPM**		Local, syndicated and/or ESPN on ABC sports programming										Local and/or syndicated programming	ABC World News Tonight	Local and/or syndicated programming	
CBS	Fall	Local and/or syndicated programming		Cake (R)	Horseland	Dino Squad	Sushi Pack	The Saturday Early Show				Strawberry Shortcake	Care Bears: Adventures in Care-a-lot	College Football Today	SEC on CBS													Local and/or syndicated programming	
CBS	Winter	Local and/or syndicated programming		Cake (R)	Horseland	Dino Squad	Sushi Pack	The Saturday Early Show				Strawberry Shortcake	Care Bears: Adventures in Care-a-lot	College Basketball on CBS												Local and/or syndicated programming	CBS Weekend News	Local and/or syndicated programming	
CBS	Spring	Local and/or syndicated programming		Cake (R)	Horseland	Dino Squad	Sushi Pack	The Saturday Early Show				Strawberry Shortcake	Care Bears: Adventures in Care-a-lot	Local, syndicated and/or CBS Sports programming						PGA Tour on CBS						Local and/or syndicated programming	CBS Weekend News	Local and/or syndicated programming	
The CW	Early fall	Local and/or syndicated programming		Will & Dewitt	Magi-Nation	Skunk Fu!	Viva Piñata	The Spectacular Spider-Man	TMNT: Back to the Sewer	Dinosaur King	**Yu-Gi-Oh! 5D's**	Chaotic		Local and/or syndicated programming															
The CW	Fall	Local and/or syndicated programming		Will & Dewitt	Skunk Fu!	Viva Piñata	**GoGoRiki**	The Spectacular Spider-Man	TMNT: Back to the Sewer	Dinosaur King	**Yu-Gi-Oh! 5D's**	Chaotic		Local and/or syndicated programming															
The CW	Mid-fall	Local and/or syndicated programming		Will & Dewitt	Teenage Mutant Ninja Turtles		**GoGoRiki**	The Spectacular Spider-Man		TMNT: Back to the Sewer	Dinosaur King	Chaotic	**Yu-Gi-Oh! 5D's**	Local and/or syndicated programming															
The CW	Winter	Local and/or syndicated programming		Will & Dewitt	The Spectacular Spider-Man	Sonic X (R)	**GoGoRiki**	Dinosaur King	TMNT: Back to the Sewer	Chaotic: M'arillian Invasion	**Huntik: Secrets & Seekers**	**Yu-Gi-Oh! 5D's**	**Kamen Rider: Dragon Knight**	Local and/or syndicated programming															
The CW	Mid-winter	Local and/or syndicated programming		Will & Dewitt	Chaotic: M'arillian Invasion	Sonic X (R)	**GoGoRiki**	Dinosaur King	TMNT: Back to the Sewer	Chaotic: M'arillian Invasion	**Huntik: Secrets & Seekers**	**Yu-Gi-Oh! 5D's**	**Kamen Rider: Dragon Knight**	Local and/or syndicated programming															
The CW	Spring	Local and/or syndicated programming		**Huntik: Secrets & Seekers**	Sonic X (R)	**GoGoRiki**		Dinosaur King	TMNT: Back to the Sewer	Chaotic: M'arillian Invasion		**Yu-Gi-Oh! 5D's**	**Kamen Rider: Dragon Knight**	Local and/or syndicated programming															
The CW	Summer	Local and/or syndicated programming		**Yu-Gi-Oh! 5D's**	Kirby: Right Back at Ya! (R)	**GoGoRiki**		Sonic X (R)	Dinosaur King	Teenage Mutant Ninja Turtles	**Kamen Rider: Dragon Knight**	Sonic X (R)	**Huntik: Secrets & Seekers**	Local and/or syndicated programming															
The CW	Mid-summer	Local and/or syndicated programming		**Yu-Gi-Oh! 5D's**	Sonic X (R)	**GoGoRiki**		Sonic X (R)	Dinosaur King	Teenage Mutant Ninja Turtles	**Kamen Rider: Dragon Knight**	Kirby: Right Back at Ya! (R)	**Huntik: Secrets & Seekers**	Local and/or syndicated programming															
The CW	Late summer	Local and/or syndicated programming		**GoGoRiki**	Winx Club (R)	Sonic X (R)		**Yu-Gi-Oh! 5D's**	Teenage Mutant Ninja Turtles		Dinosaur King	**Kamen Rider: Dragon Knight**	**Huntik: Secrets & Seekers**	Local and/or syndicated programming															
Fox	Fall	Local and/or syndicated programming				Di-Gata Defenders	Biker Mice from Mars	Sonic X (R)		**Chaotic: M'arillian Invasion**	Teenage Mutant Ninja Turtles: Fast Forward	Kirby: Right Back at Ya! (R)	Winx Club (R)	Local, syndicated and/or Fox Sports programming														Local and/or syndicated programming	
Fox	Winter	Local and/or syndicated programming								**Weekend Marketplace**				Local, syndicated and/or Fox Sports programming														Local and/or syndicated programming	
Fox	Spring	Local and/or syndicated programming								**Weekend Marketplace**				Local, syndicated and/or Fox Sports programming							This Week in Baseball	Fox Saturday Baseball (continued to game completion)						Local and/or syndicated programming	
NBC	Fall	Local and/or syndicated programming				Today				Jane and the Dragon (R)	The Zula Patrol	3-2-1 Penguins!	VeggieTales	**Turbo Dogs**	My Friend Rabbit	Local, syndicated and/or NBC Sports programming			Notre Dame Football on NBC							Local and/or syndicated programming	NBC Nightly News	Local and/or syndicated programming	
NBC	Winter	Local and/or syndicated programming				Today				VeggieTales	3-2-1 Penguins!	Turbo Dogs	Babar (R)	The Zula Patrol	My Friend Rabbit	Local, syndicated and/or NBC Sports programming				PGA Tour on NBC						Local and/or syndicated programming	NBC Nightly News	Local and/or syndicated programming	
NBC	Spring	Local and/or syndicated programming				Today				VeggieTales	3-2-1 Penguins!	Turbo Dogs	Babar (R)	The Zula Patrol	My Friend Rabbit	Local, syndicated and/or NBC Sports programming										Local and/or syndicated programming	NBC Nightly News	Local and/or syndicated programming	

=== Sunday ===
Network		6:00 a.m.	6:30 a.m.	7:00 a.m.	7:30 a.m.	8:00 a.m.	8:30 a.m.	9:00 a.m.	9:30 a.m.	10:00 a.m.	10:30 a.m.	11:00 a.m.	11:30 a.m.	Noon	12:30 p.m.	1:00 p.m.	1:30 p.m.	2:00 p.m.	2:30 p.m.	3:00 p.m.	3:30 p.m.	4:00 p.m.	4:30 p.m.	5:00 p.m.	5:30 p.m.	6:00 p.m.	6:30 p.m.
ABC		Local and/or syndicated programming		Good Morning America Weekend		Local and/or syndicated programming		This Week with George Stephanopoulos		Local and/or syndicated programming		Local, syndicated and/or ESPN on ABC sports programming		Local, Syndicated And/or ESPN on ABC sports programming												Local and/or syndicated programming	ABC World News Tonight
CBS	Fall	Local and/or syndicated programming						CBS News Sunday Morning			Face the Nation	Local and/or syndicated programming		The NFL Today		NFL on CBS (continued until game completion)											
CBS	Winter	Local and/or syndicated programming						CBS News Sunday Morning			Face the Nation	Local and/or syndicated programming		Local, Syndicated and/or CBS Sports programming												Local and/or syndicated programming	CBS Weekend News
CBS	Spring	Local and/or syndicated programming						CBS News Sunday Morning			Face the Nation	Local and/or syndicated programming		Local, Syndicated and/or CBS Sports programming						PGA Tour on CBS						Local and/or syndicated programming	CBS Weekend News
CBS	Summer	Local and/or syndicated programming						CBS News Sunday Morning			Face the Nation	Local and/or syndicated programming		Local, Syndicated and/or CBS Sports programming												Local and/or syndicated programming	CBS Weekend News
The CW	Fall	Local and/or syndicated programming																						4Real		**In Harm's Way** (R)	
The CW	Mid-fall	Local and/or syndicated programming																						4Real		**Valentine** (R)	
The CW	Late fall	Local and/or syndicated programming																						Everybody Hates Chris (R)	The Game (R)	The Drew Carey Show (R)	
Fox	Fall	Local and/or syndicated programming						Fox News Sunday		Local and/or syndicated programming				Fox NFL Sunday		Fox NFL (continued to game completion)											
Fox	Winter	Local and/or syndicated programming						Fox News Sunday		Local and/or syndicated programming				Local, syndicated and/or Fox Sports programming				NASCAR on Fox								Local and/or syndicated programming	
Fox	Spring	Local and/or syndicated programming						Fox News Sunday		Local and/or syndicated programming				Local, syndicated and/or Fox Sports programming													
NBC	Fall	Local and/or syndicated programming		Today		Local and/or syndicated programming		Meet the Press		Local and/or syndicated programming				Local, syndicated and/or NBC Sports programming												Local and/or syndicated programming	NBC Nightly News
NBC	Winter	Local and/or syndicated programming		Today		Local and/or syndicated programming		Meet the Press		Local and/or syndicated programming				NHL on NBC						PGA Tour on NBC						Local and/or syndicated programming	NBC Nightly News
NBC	Spring	Local and/or syndicated programming		Today		Local and/or syndicated programming		Meet the Press		Local and/or syndicated programming				Local, syndicated and/or NBC Sports programming												Local and/or syndicated programming	NBC Nightly News

== By network ==
=== ABC ===
Returning series:

- ABC World News Tonight
- All My Children
- College Football Scoreboard
- General Hospital
- Good Morning America
- ESPN College Football on ABC
- One Life to Live
- This Week
- The View
- ABC Kids
  - The Emperor's New School (reruns)
  - Hannah Montana (reruns)
  - Power Rangers Jungle Fury
  - The Replacements (reruns)
  - The Suite Life of Zack & Cody (reruns)
  - That's So Raven (reruns)

New series:

- ABC Kids
  - Power Rangers RPM

Not returning from 2007–08:

- NBA Access with Ahmad Rashad

=== CBS ===
Returning series:

- As the World Turns
- The Bold and the Beautiful
- CBS Evening News
- College Football Today
- Guiding Light
- NFL on CBS
- The NFL Today
- SEC on CBS
- The Young and the Restless
- KEWLopolis
  - Cake (reruns)
  - Care Bears: Adventures in Care-a-lot
  - Dino Squad
  - Horseland
  - Strawberry Shortcake
  - Sushi Pack

Not returning from 2007-08:

- KEWLopolis
  - Sabrina: The Animated Series
  - Trollz

=== The CW ===
Returning series:

- Everybody Hates Chris (reruns)
- The Game (reruns)
- The CW4Kids
  - Chaotic
  - Dinosaur King
  - Kirby: Right Back at Ya! (reruns)
  - Magi-Nation
  - Skunk Fu!
  - Sonic X (reruns)
  - The Spectacular Spider-Man
  - Teenage Mutant Ninja Turtles
  - Viva Piñata
  - Will & Dewitt
  - Winx Club (reruns)

New series:

- 4Real
- The Drew Carey Show (reruns)
- The Jamie Foxx Show (reruns)
- Judge Jeanine Pirro
- The Wayans Bros. (reruns)
- The CW4Kids
  - GoGoRiki
  - Huntik: Secrets & Seekers
  - Kamen Rider: Dragon Knight
  - Yu-Gi-Oh! 5D's

Not returning from 2007–08:

- All of Us (reruns)
- Girlfriends
- Gossip Girl
- One Tree Hill
- Reba (reruns)
- What I Like About You (reruns)

=== Fox ===
Returning series:

- Biker Mice from Mars
- Chaotic
- Di-Gata Defenders
- Fox News Sunday
- Fox NFL Sunday
- Fox Saturday Baseball
- Kirby: Right Back at Ya! (reruns)
- NASCAR on Fox
- NFL on Fox
- Sonic X (reruns)
- Teenage Mutant Ninja Turtles (reruns)
- This Week in Baseball
- Winx Club (reruns)

=== NBC ===
Returning series:

- Days of Our Lives
- Early Today
- Meet the Press
- NBC Nightly News
- Notre Dame Football on NBC
- Today
- Qubo
  - Babar
  - Jane and the Dragon (reruns)
  - My Friend Rabbit
  - 3-2-1 Penguins!
  - VeggieTales
  - The Zula Patrol

New series:

- Qubo
  - Turbo Dogs

== Renewals and cancellations ==
=== Cancellations/series endings ===
==== CBS ====
- Guiding Light— Canceled after 72 seasons (57 years on television and 19 years on radio, with simultaneous radio and television broadcasts from 1952 to 1956) on April 1, 2009; the series concluded its CBS run on September 18, 2009.

== See also ==
- 2008–09 United States network television schedule (prime-time)
- 2008–09 United States network television schedule (late night)

== Sources ==
- Curt Alliaume. "ABC Daytime Schedule". Curt Alliaume’s Utterly Irrelevant Web Site. Archived from the original on October 15, 2007.
- Curt Alliaume. "CBS Daytime Schedule". Curt Alliaume’s Utterly Irrelevant Web Site. Archived from the original on October 15, 2007.
- Curt Alliaume. "NBC Daytime Schedule". Curt Alliaume’s Utterly Irrelevant Web Site. Archived from the original on October 12, 2007.
