= 2010–11 United States network television schedule (daytime) =

The 2010–11 daytime network television schedule for four of the five major English-language commercial broadcast networks in the United States covers the weekday daytime hours from September 2010 to August 2011. The schedule is followed by a list per network of returning series, and any series canceled after the 2009–2010 season.

Affiliates fill time periods not occupied by network programs with local or syndicated programming. PBS – which offers daytime programming through a children's program block, PBS Kids – is not included, as its member television stations have local flexibility over most of their schedules and broadcast times for network shows may vary. Also not included are stations affiliated with Fox (as the network does not air a daytime network schedule or network news), MyNetworkTV (as the programming service also does not offer daytime programs of any kind), The CW Plus (as its schedule is composed mainly of syndicated reruns), and Ion Television (as its schedule airs programming from the Qubo block and syndicated reruns).

== Legend ==
- Light yellow indicates talk shows.
- Green indicates soap operas.
- Pink indicates game shows.
- Gold indicates news programming.
- White indicates local programming.
- Gray indicates encore programming (e.g., reruns of prime-time programming).
- Light teal indicates sporting events.
- Light purple indicates children's programming.
- Light blue indicates other programs not applicable to the above categorizations.
- New series are highlighted in **bold**.

== Schedule ==
- All times correspond to U.S. Eastern and Pacific Time scheduling (except for some live sports or events). Except where affiliates slot certain programs outside their network-dictated timeslots, subtract one hour for Central, Mountain, Alaska, and Hawaii–Aleutian times.
- Local schedules may differ, as affiliates have the option to pre-empt or delay network programs. Such scheduling may be limited to preemptions caused by local or national breaking news or weather coverage (which may force stations to tape delay certain programs in overnight timeslots or defer them to a co-operated station or digital subchannel in their regular timeslot) and any major sports events scheduled to air in a weekday timeslot (mainly during major holidays). Stations may air shows at other times at their preference.

=== Monday-Friday ===
| Network | | 7:00 am | 7:30 am | 8:00 am | 8:30 am | 9:00 am | 9:30 am | 10:00 am | 10:30 am | 11:00 am | 11:30 am | noon | 12:30 pm | 1:00 pm | 1:30 pm | 2:00 pm | 2:30 pm | 3:00 pm | 3:30 pm | 4:00 pm | 4:30 pm | 5:00 pm | 5:30 pm | 6:00 pm | 6:30 pm |
|---|---|---|---|---|---|---|---|---|---|---|---|---|---|---|---|---|---|---|---|---|---|---|---|---|---|
| ABC | | Good Morning America | | | | Local and/or syndicated programming | | | | The View | | Local and/or syndicated programming | | All My Children | | One Life to Live | | General Hospital | | Local and/or syndicated programming | | | | | ABC World News with Diane Sawyer |
| CBS | Fall | The Early Show | | | | Local and/or syndicated programming | | Let's Make a Deal | | The Price Is Right | | Local and/or syndicated programming | The Young and the Restless | | The Bold and the Beautiful | **The Talk** | | Local and/or syndicated programming | | | | | | | CBS Evening News with Katie Couric |
| CBS | Summer | The Early Show | | | | Local and/or syndicated programming | | Let's Make a Deal | | The Price Is Right | | Local and/or syndicated programming | The Young and the Restless | | The Bold and the Beautiful | **The Talk** | | Local and/or syndicated programming | | | | | | | CBS Evening News with Scott Pelley |
| NBC | | Today | | | | | | | | Local and/or syndicated programming | | | | Days of Our Lives | | Local and/or syndicated programming | | | | | | | | | NBC Nightly News with Brian Williams |
| CW | | Local and/or syndicated programming | | | | | | | | | | | | | | | | The Tyra Banks Show (R) | | The Tyra Banks Show (R; ^{‡}) | | Local and/or syndicated programming | | | |

Notes:

- (¤) As CBS was transitioning shows in the 2:00 p.m. ET timeslot at the time due to the cancellation of As the World Turns, The Price Is Right aired in that hour during the weeks of September 20 and October 4 and Let's Make a Deal filled the slot during the weeks of September 27 and October 11, prior to the premiere of The Talk. Both game shows ran first-run episodes for both time slots.
- (‡) On September 19, 2011, The CW returned the 4:00 p.m. hour to its owned-and-operated stations and affiliates.

=== Saturday ===
| Network | | 7:00 am | 7:30 am | 8:00 am | 8:30 am | 9:00 am | 9:30 am | 10:00 am | 10:30 am | 11:00 am | 11:30 am | noon | 12:30 pm | 1:00 pm | 1:30 pm | 2:00 pm | 2:30 pm | 3:00 pm | 3:30 pm | 4:00 pm | 4:30 pm | 5:00 pm | 5:30 pm | 6:00 pm | 6:30 pm |
|---|---|---|---|---|---|---|---|---|---|---|---|---|---|---|---|---|---|---|---|---|---|---|---|---|---|
| ABC | Fall | Local and/or syndicated programming | | Good Morning America | | The Emperor's New School (R) | The Replacements (R) | That's So Raven (R) | | Hannah Montana (R) | The Suite Life of Zack and Cody (R) | Local and/or syndicated programming | | ESPN College Football on ABC | | | | | | | | | | | |
| ABC | Winter | Local and/or syndicated programming | | Good Morning America | | The Emperor's New School (R) | The Replacements (R) | That's So Raven (R) | | Hannah Montana (R) | The Suite Life of Zack and Cody (R) | Local and/or syndicated programming | | ESPN on ABC and/or local programming | | | | ESPN on ABC programming | | | | | | Local news | ABC World News Saturday |
| ABC | Spring | Local and/or syndicated programming | | Good Morning America | | Local and/or syndicated programming | | The Emperor's New School (R) | The Replacements (R) | That's So Raven (R) | | Hannah Montana (R) | The Suite Life of Zack and Cody (R) | ESPN on ABC and/or local programming | | | | ESPN on ABC programming | | | | | | Local news | ABC World News Saturday |
| CBS | Fall | The Saturday Early Show | | | | Busytown Mysteries | | Doodlebops Rockin' Road Show | | **Sabrina's Secret Life** | Sabrina: The Animated Series (R) | SEC on CBS | | | | | | | | | | | | | |
| CBS | Winter | The Saturday Early Show | | | | Busytown Mysteries | | Doodlebops Rockin' Road Show | | **Sabrina's Secret Life** | Sabrina: The Animated Series (R) | CBS Sports and/or local programming | | | | | | CBS Sports programming | | | | | | Local news | CBS Evening News |
| CBS | Spring | The Saturday Early Show | | | | Horseland (R) | | Busytown Mysteries | | Doodlebops Rockin' Road Show | Trollz (R) | CBS Sports and/or local programming | | | | | | CBS Sports programming | | | | | | Local news | CBS Evening News |
| NBC | | Today | | | | Local and/or syndicated programming | | Turbo Dogs | Shelldon | **The Magic School Bus** (R) | Babar (R) | Willa's Wild Life | **Pearlie** | NBC Sports and/or local programming | | | | NBC Sports programming | | | | | | Local news | NBC Nightly News with Lester Holt |
| Fox | Fall | Local and/or syndicated programming | | | | | | Weekend Marketplace | | | | Fox Sports and/or local programming | | | | | | | | | | | | | |
| Fox | April | Local and/or syndicated programming | | | | | | Weekend Marketplace | | | | This Week In Baseball | Fox Sports and/or local programming | | | | | | | | | | | | |
| The CW | Fall | Cubix: Robots for Everyone (R) | | Sonic X (R) | | Yu-Gi-Oh! (R) | Dragon Ball Z Kai | | Yu-Gi-Oh! 5D's | | Dinosaur King (R) | Local and/or syndicated programming | | | | | | | | | | | | | |
| The CW | October | Cubix: Robots for Everyone (R) | | Sonic X (R) | | Yu-Gi-Oh! (R) | Sonic X (R) | Dragon Ball Z Kai | | Yu-Gi-Oh! 5D's | | Local and/or syndicated programming | | | | | | | | | | | | | |
| The CW | Spring | Magi-Nation (R) | | Sonic X (R) | | Yu-Gi-Oh! (R) | Sonic X (R) | Dragon Ball Z Kai | | Yu-Gi-Oh! (R) | Yu-Gi-Oh! 5D's | Local and/or syndicated programming | | | | | | | | | | | | | |

=== Sunday ===
| Network | | 7:00 am | 7:30 am | 8:00 am | 8:30 am | 9:00 am | 9:30 am | 10:00 am | 10:30 am | 11:00 am | 11:30 am | noon | 12:30 pm | 1:00 pm | 1:30 pm | 2:00 pm | 2:30 pm | 3:00 pm | 3:30 pm | 4:00 pm | 4:30 pm | 5:00 pm | 5:30 pm | 6:00 pm | 6:30 pm |
|---|---|---|---|---|---|---|---|---|---|---|---|---|---|---|---|---|---|---|---|---|---|---|---|---|---|
| ABC | | Local and/or syndicated programming | | Good Morning America | | Local and/or syndicated programming | | This Week with Christiane Amanpour | | ESPN on ABC and/or local programming | | | | | | | | | | | | | | Local news | ABC World News Sunday |
| CBS | Fall | Local and/or syndicated programming | | | | CBS News Sunday Morning | | | Face the Nation | Local and/or syndicated programming | | NFL Today | | NFL on CBS | | | | | | | | | | | |
| CBS | Mid-winter | Local and/or syndicated programming | | | | CBS News Sunday Morning | | | Face the Nation | Local and/or syndicated programming | | CBS Sports and/or local programming | | | | | | | | | | | | Local news | CBS Evening News |
| NBC | | Local and/or syndicated programming | | Today | | Meet the Press | | Local and/or syndicated programming | | | | NBC Sports and/or local programming | | | | | | | | | | | | Local news | NBC Nightly News with Lester Holt |
| Fox | Fall | Local and/or syndicated programming | | | | Fox News Sunday | | Local and/or syndicated programming | | | | Fox NFL Sunday | | Fox NFL (and sometimes local programming) | | | | | | | | | | | |
| Fox | Mid-winter | Local and/or syndicated programming | | | | Fox News Sunday | | Local and/or syndicated programming | | | | Fox Sports and/or local programming | | | | | | | | | | | | Local and/or syndicated programming | |

== By network ==
=== ABC ===
Returning series:

- ABC Kids
  - The Emperor's New School (reruns)
  - Hannah Montana (reruns)
  - The Replacements (reruns)
  - The Suite Life of Zack and Cody (reruns)
  - That's So Raven (reruns)
- ABC World News with Diane Sawyer
- All My Children
- General Hospital
- Good Morning America
- One Life to Live
- This Week with Christiane Amanpour
- The View

Not returning from 2009–10:

- ABC Kids
  - Mighty Morphin Power Rangers (re-version)
  - Power Rangers RPM

=== CBS ===
Returning series:

- The Bold and the Beautiful
- CBS Sunday Morning
- CBS Evening News with Katie Couric
- CBS Sports
  - NFL on CBS
  - SEC on CBS
  - The NFL Today
- Cookie Jar TV
  - Busytown Mysteries
  - Horseland (reruns)
  - Sabrina: The Animated Series (reruns)
  - Sabrina's Secret Life (reruns)
  - Doodlebops Rockin' Road Show
  - Trollz (reruns)
- The Early Show
- Face the Nation
- Let's Make a Deal
- The Price Is Right
- The Young and the Restless

New series:

- **The Talk**

Not returning from 2009–10:

- As the World Turns
- Cookie Jar TV
  - Noonbory and the Super Seven
  - Strawberry Shortcake

=== Fox ===
Returning series:

- Fox News Sunday
- Fox Sports
  - Fox NFL
  - Fox NFL Sunday
  - This Week In Baseball
- Weekend Marketplace

=== NBC ===
Returning series:

- Days of Our Lives
- Meet the Press
- NBC Nightly News with Brian Williams
- Qubo (shared with Ion Television)
  - Babar (reruns)
  - Shelldon
  - The Magic School Bus (reruns) (moved from Fox Kids)
  - Turbo Dogs
  - Willa's Wild Life
- Today with Matt Lauer and Meredith Vieira / Ann Curry
  - Today with Hoda and Kathie Lee

New series:

- Qubo (shared with Ion Television)
  - **Pearlie**

Not returning from 2009–10:

- Qubo (shared with Ion Television)
  - 3-2-1 Penguins!
  - Jacob Two-Two
  - Jane and the Dragon (reruns)
  - My Friend Rabbit (reruns)
  - The Zula Patrol

=== The CW ===
Returning series:

- Toonzai
  - Cubix: Robots for Everyone (reruns)
  - Dinosaur King (reruns)
  - Dragon Ball Z Kai
  - Magi-Nation (reruns)
  - Sonic X (reruns)
  - Yu-Gi-Oh! (reruns)
  - Yu-Gi-Oh! 5Ds
- The Tyra Banks Show (reruns)

Not returning from 2009–10:

- Toonzai
  - Chaotic: Secrets of the Lost City
  - Huntik: Secrets & Seekers (reruns)
  - RollBots
  - TMNT: Back to the Sewer
  - Kamen Rider: Dragon Knight

== Renewals and cancellations ==
=== Cancellations/series endings ===
==== ABC ====
- All My Children—Canceled after 41 years on April 14, 2011; the series concluded its ABC run on September 23, 2011.
- One Life to Live—Canceled after 43 years on April 14, 2011; the series concluded its ABC run on January 13, 2012.

== See also ==
- 2010–11 United States network television schedule (prime-time)
- 2010–11 United States network television schedule (late night)

== Sources ==
- Curt Alliaume. "ABC Daytime Schedule". Curt Alliaume’s Utterly Irrelevant Web Site. Archived from the original on October 15, 2007.
- Curt Alliaume. "CBS Daytime Schedule". Curt Alliaume’s Utterly Irrelevant Web Site. Archived from the original on October 15, 2007.
- Curt Alliaume. "NBC Daytime Schedule". Curt Alliaume’s Utterly Irrelevant Web Site. Archived from the original on October 12, 2007.
