= Danger Rangers =

Children's animated television series

- Genre: Educational; Musical
- Created by: Walter Douglas Smith Jr. Michael D. Moore; Christopher and Scott West (characters)
- Directed by: John Kafka; Ginny McSwain (voice director)
- Voices of: Charlie Adler; Grey DeLisle; Mark Hamill; Jerry Houser; John Kassir; Rob Paulsen; Kevin Michael Richardson; Tasia Valenza
- Country of origin: United States
- Original language: English
- No. of seasons: 1
- No. of episodes: 16

Production
- Executive producers: Howard G. Kazanjian; Ilie Agopian; Larry Huber; Michael D. Moore
- Producers: Jerry Houser; Sean Roche
- Running time: 28 minutes
- Production companies: Educational Adventures (Note: later Mighty Kids Media); Animotion Works Inc.

Original release
- Network: PBS Kids (Note: Member stations); CBS (Cookie Jar TV)
- Release: September 5, 2005 – December 26, 2006

Danger Rangers is an American animated television series that aired on PBS Kids from September 5, 2005, to December 26, 2006, for 16 episodes.

The series is aimed at children ages 3 to 7.

== Premise ==
The Danger Rangers are a team of anthropomorphic animal heroes who protect the youth of the world and teach the children a thing or two about safety through example in the process, such as environmental hazards and unsafe places. Together, they operate out of their base located inside Mount Rushmore, ready to save the day whenever they're needed.

Episodes usually involve either children getting themselves in jeopardizing danger from their own mistakes, necessitating the Rangers saving them and teaching them about making smart choices in the future, or the actions of misguided antagonists intentionally putting as many children at serious risk of danger and harm at possible, requiring the Rangers stopping them (the only episode that doesn't rely on either of these plotlines is "Wet and Wild!"). Each episode contains a music video or two (written by Randy Rogel of Animaniacs fame) featuring the characters themed to whatever safety topic said episode is discussing. At the end of each episode, a mini-segment plays that recaps the lessons learned from the events of that particular episode.

== Characters ==
- Sully (voiced by Jerry Houser) is a blue sea lion. He is the leader and spokesanimal of the Danger Rangers. He has a mild ego and cares a lot about his appearance, but also takes his duties as leader seriously and competently.
- Kitty (voiced by Grey DeLisle) is a pink cat. She is the intelligent, cool and adventurous second-in-command of the group. She is also helpful and resourceful, and strongly believes in playing fair.
- Burble (voiced by Kevin Michael Richardson) is a large polar bear. He is the strong and humorous recreational safety expert. He is also the group's "gentle giant" and prefers to play both fair and safe.
- Squeeky (voiced by Rob Paulsen) is a navy blue mouse. He is a snarky, wisecracking smart-mouth, and small, yet very valuable to the Danger Rangers. With his size, he can fix any problem which otherwise proves to be too small for the others to handle.
- Burt (voiced by Mark Hamill) is a green turtle and the brains of the group. He is the team's creative personal safety expert. As the team's inventor, Burt always comes up with inventions, including Fallbot, that help the Danger Rangers in their missions.
- Gabriella "GB" (voiced by Tasia Valenza) is a red hummingbird. She is the operations chief and head safety trainer. While the other members go out on the field during a mission, she usually acts as mission control, staying back at headquarters as a supervisor.
- Fallbot (voiced by John Kassir) is a blue-and-yellow robot who was invented by Burt and wants to learn about safety. He is very clumsy, goofy and accident-prone, but an ally of the Danger Rangers nonetheless.
- SAVO (voiced by Jonathan Harris in "Mission 547: Safety Rules", Charlie Adler in other episodes) is the supercomputer and artificial intelligence of the Danger Rangers' base who alerts them of any troubling safety disturbances. He also has somewhat of a flair for the dramatic. His name is an acronym for "Safety Alert Vectometer" (as shown in "Mission 547: Safety Rules").
- The Junior Danger Rangers are various children who help and work along with the Danger Rangers.

== Cast ==
=== Main ===
- Charlie Adler as SAVO, Chimpanzee (ep. 1), Police Officer (ep. 2), Kid (ep. 3), Gopher Dad (ep. 4), Frinja #3 (ep. 6), Worker #1 (ep. 6), Record Executive (ep. 8), Herbert Dinkwell (ep. 10)
- Grey DeLisle as Kitty, Penguin (ep. 1), Lil (ep. 1), Kate (ep. 2), Child (ep. 3), Kwan (ep. 3), Mom (ep. 3), Fabiola (ep. 4, 15), Badger Kid (ep. 5), Jack (ep. 6), Mrs. Hopper (ep. 7), Mateo (ep. 8), Bobby (ep. 9), Queen of England (ep. 10), Jackie (ep. 11), Jodie (ep. 14), Teacher (ep. 14)
- Mark Hamill as Burt, Lobster Theodore (ep. 1), Carl the Electrical Worker (ep. 3), Driver (ep. 5), Mayor of Digger's Gold (ep. 9), Butler (ep. 10)
- Jerry Houser as Sully, Police Officer (ep. 3), Audience Guy #1 (ep. 5), Decibull #3 (ep. 8), Dad (ep. 8), Paramedic (ep. 10)
- John Kassir as Fallbot, Peter Possum (ep. 1), Fox Dad (ep. 4), Eddie (ep. 5), Frinja #2 (ep. 6), Decibull #2 (ep. 8), Police Officer (ep. 8), Giles (ep. 9), Fire Chief (ep. 10), Beaver Guy (ep. 11), Duncan (ep. 14), Kid #1 (ep. 14)
- Rob Paulsen as Squeeky, Snarf (ep. 2), Quentin V. Manderbill (ep. 3), Firework Announcer (ep. 4), Sparky's Dad (ep. 5), Frinja #1 (ep. 6), Billy Goat (ep. 7), Mr. Curl (ep. 7), Decibull #1 (ep. 8), Inspector Brumell (ep. 10), Mr. Buckster (ep. 11), Luke (ep. 12), Ship Crew Member (ep. 13), Chancy McSpill (ep. 14), Scott (ep. 15)
- Kevin Michael Richardson as Burble, Chili Dog (ep. 2), Judge Maxim (ep. 4), Audience Guy #2 (ep. 5), Frinja #4 (ep. 6), Knuckles (ep. 8), Detective (ep. 10), Lonnie (ep. 10), Announcer (ep. 14)
- Tasia Valenza as Gabriella the Hummingbird, London Reporter (ep. 1), Raccoon Kid #2 (ep. 1), Firefighter #3 (ep. 4), Ana Gomez (ep. 14)

=== Additional ===
- Pamela Adlon as Carl (ep. 8), Martin (ep. 8)
- Jeff Bennett as Henri Ennui (ep. 6), EMT (ep. 6), Factory Owner (ep. 6)
- Gregg Berger as Commander Octodon (ep. 1)
- Cassie Boyd as Talya Mendoza (ep. 14), Kid #2 (ep. 14), Kid #3 (ep. 14)
- Kimberly Brooks as Boy (ep. 3), Girl #2 (ep. 3)
- Jodi Carlisle as Mother (ep. 8), Teacher (ep. 8)
- Justin Cowden as Derek (ep. 4, 15), Dad (ep. 4, 15), Gopher Kid (ep. 4)
- E. G. Daily as Bobby (ep. 5), Kid (ep. 5), Sparky (ep. 5)
- Debi Derryberry as Emily (ep. 10), Mark (ep. 10), Royal Secretary (ep. 10)
- Jessica DiCicco as Manny (ep. 6), Moe (ep. 6)
- Nika Futterman as Sheila the Cancun Reporter (ep. 1), Harry (ep. 1), Raccoon Kid #1 (ep. 1)
- Kim Mai Guest as Angela (ep. 3), Girl #1 (ep. 3)
- Jess Harnell as Captain Squall (ep. 13), Chival Brayski (ep. 13), Cruise Director (ep. 13)
- Jonathan Harris as S.A.V.O. (ep. 7)
- Amber Hood as Andy (ep. 5), Boy (ep. 5), Pauley (ep. 5)
- Richard Steven Horvitz as Worley the Weasel (ep. 5), Beaver (ep. 5)
- Joe Lala as Hector Delgado (ep. 1), Joey Clams (ep. 1), Raccoon Dad (ep. 1)
- Carolyn Lawrence as Ana (ep. 15), Millie (ep. 15)
- Katie Leigh as Adam (ep. 15)
- Sherry Lynn as Casey (ep. 4), Panda Girl (ep. 4), Panda Mom (ep. 4), Kelly Lamb (ep. 7), Mrs. Curl (ep. 7), Raccoon Kid (ep. 7), Casey (ep. 15), Kareen (ep. 15)
- Danny Mann as Dudek Brayski (ep. 13), Frantik Brayski (ep. 13)
- Jason Marsden as Alex (ep. 1, pilot), Rusty Ringtail (ep. 2), Jack, Kevin, and Matt (ep. 3), Lucky Curl (ep. 1, pilot)
- Annie Mumolo as Jose (ep. 9)
- Liza del Mundo as Billy (ep. 5), Police Officer (ep. 5), Wendy (ep. 5)
- David Prince as Fire Chief Daniels (ep. 4), Tall Tale Tim (ep. 9), Fire Ranger (ep. 9)
- Michael Reisz as Scott (ep. 4), Panda Dad (ep. 4)
- Marilyn Rising as Kids (ep. 9)
- Crystal Scales as Danny (ep. 10), Harrison (ep. 10)
- Justin Shenkarow as Jenkins (ep. 10), Nick (ep. 10)
- Kath Soucie as Mrs. Martha Barkster (ep. 12), Amy (ep. 12), Antny (ep. 12)
- Andre Stojka as Mr. Barkster (ep. 12)
- Danny Strong as Casey (ep. 9), Mickey (ep. 9)
- Tara Strong as Juan (ep. 2), Timmy (ep. 2)
- Cree Summer as Alisha (ep. 13), Alisha's Mom (ep. 13)
- Philip Tanzini as Brutus (ep. 5), Joey (ep. 5)
- Rosslyn Taylor as Willie Buckster (ep. 11), Cookie (ep. 11)
- Mark Thompson as Monster Truck Rally Announcer (ep. 5)
- Lauren Tom as Firefighter #2 (ep. 4), Miko (ep. 4), Poodle Kid (ep. 4)
- Kari Wahlgren as Alice Buckster (ep. 11), Mrs. Buckster (ep. 11)
- Audrey Wasilewski as Julie (ep. 9), Kareen (ep. 9), Denny (ep. 12), Dex (ep. 12)
- Frank Welker as Mr. Sherman (ep. 11), Rufio (ep. 11), Sparky the Robot Dog (ep. 11)

== Episodes ==
No.	Title	Directed by	Written by	Storyboard by	Song(s)	Original release date	Prod. code
1	"Water Works"	John Kafka	Sean Roche	Garrett Ho and Dave Rodriguez	"Everybody Be Water Safe"	September 3, 2005	103
The Danger Rangers deal with the first member of their rogues' gallery, Commander Octodon, when he tries to build a vast, elaborate underwater hideout, and sends his henchmen Lobster Theodore and Joey Clams to sabotage the pools that the Danger Rangers plan to build all over the world. When Fallbot (the Rangers' new member and robot sidekick) comes with them, the locals blame him for it.
2	"Wild Wheels"	John Kafka	Sean Roche	Louis Scarborough	"Wheels" & "Rules of the Road"	September 10, 2005	102
A notorious figure from Burble's past, Rusty Ringtail, resurfaces to builds skate ramps in New York City so he and his friends Snarf and Chili Dog can skate to the top of the Statue of Liberty. Burble has previously encountered Rusty before in his early work and works to reason with him.
3	"Where the Fun Never Stops"	John Kafka	Sean Roche	Garrett Ho, Elaine Hultgren, Tom Mazzocco and Louis Scarborough	"When You're Coming Down That Slide" & "Keep Yourself Safe"	October 13, 2005	105
During Boston's power surge problem, Nobel Prize-winning inventor and scientist Quentin V. Manderbill plots to build a transporter powered by the wasted energy that children use playing on the prize-rigged, freak accident-causing playground equipment made by his Play Along Playground Equipment company. Kids can only get to said toys if they willingly endanger themselves on them. When the Danger Rangers end up captured, Gabriela contacts their Junior Danger Ranger allies in Boston for help.
4	"Fires and Liars"	John Kafka	Sean Roche	Bob Nesler, Bert Ring, Dave Rodriguez and Louis Scarborough	"False Alarms" & "Never Mess Around with Fire"	October 24, 2005	104
The Danger Rangers celebrate National Fire Safety Month across the United States. Meanwhile, in Chicago, two boys named Derek and Scott cause a false alarm 911 call that Fire Chief Daniels and his fire department respond to. Things get really hot when Derek and Scott abscond off and play with some fireworks, and accidentally set them all off at once, which in turn starts a major fire near their building that sets a nearby apartment on fire. Sully and Kitty must help the Chicago Fire Department put out the fire, rescue the building's inhabitants, and teach Derek and Scott about fire safety.
5	"The Great Race"	Bob Nesler	Randy Rogel; Story by : Mike D. Moore	Elaine Hultgren and Bob Nesler	"Use That Crosswalk" & "Make Sure They See You"	November 26, 2005	108
At a time when the Danger Rangers are preparing for their appearance at the Monster Truck Relay, Worley the Weasel and his friends hold a secret jogging race for the prize of the mini-monster truck. The Danger Rangers arrive to teach pedestrian safety and thwart Worley's plot.
6	"Medicine Mix-Up"	John Kafka	Kurt Weldon	Greg Garcia and Elaine Hultgren	"Don't Touch Them Pills" & "Common Sense"	January 28, 2006	106
In Paris, a brilliant, yet evil scientist poodle named Henri Ennui has a scheme to use a stink gun, a "Rancinator", to stink up the world's candy and junk food supply as part of a ransom of $50,000,000.00. With most junk foods now smelling completely horrible, this causes kids to seek out things that look like sweets by raiding medicine cabinets and purses for anything shaped like candy, but are actually medicine, which has some of the kids promptly get sick and rushed en route to the hospital. The Danger Rangers head out to intervene in the mix-ups, confiscate the rancid-smelling candy, and defeat Henri Ennui (who turns out to have a history with Kitty) and his "Frinja" rat henchmen.
7	"Mission 547: Safety Rules"	Jamie Diaz, Larry Leichliter and Bob Nesler	Sean Roche	Louie Scarborough, Bernie Petterson and Mario Piluso	"911" & "Danger Rangers Pilot Ending Song"	February 27, 2006	101
This series of vignettes shows a typical day in the life of the Rangers when they're not pursuing a villain or dealing with a particular kid. Kitty and Sully visit a pig family to teach them about checking on hidden dangers inside the home, Burble and Squeeky are on vehicular and travel safety duty (Burble teaching kids about proper bicycle safety rules while Squeeky inspects cars to make sure everyone's buckled up), and Burt is off by himself, educating kids on what to do if they get lost, with humorous results. At the end of the day, everyone enjoys a dip in the pool while learning about basic pool courtesy, before the Rangers return home with the knowledge that these kids are now well-educated on safety. NOTE: This is considered the show's pilot episode. As such, Gabriella and Fallbot are notably absent from this episode.
8	"Safe and Sound"	John Kafka	Sean Roche; Story by : Larry Huber	Dave Rodriguez, Louis Scarborough and Byron Vaughns	"Protect Your Ears" & "It's All Up to Me"	March 3, 2006	107
The Danger Rangers must face the music, quite literally, to not only save Hollywood from the music of the new rock band the Decibulls, which is shaking up buildings enough to cause hazardous artificial earthquakes and mysteriously always plays at dangerously loud volumes, but snap Sully (the Decibulls' biggest fan) and his ego back into reality as the Decibulls' corrupt manager, Buck Huckster, butters him up to be his next big star. Meanwhile, Burt discovers that the CDs by the Decibulls have been purposely made so they literally can't be turned down by any means by the band's manager and sinister bodyguard Knuckles, who want their music to be loud in the musical competition.
9	"Cave Save"	John Kafka	David Ehrman	Kyle A. Carrozza, Louis Scarborough and Byron Vaughns	"Cave Save" & "Places Not to Play"	July 7, 2006	109
After hearing tales of old-timer and benefactor Digger Diaz's mining adventures from Tall Tale Tim (the resident storyteller) in the quaint little local town of Digger's Gold, New Mexico, four local children named Mickey, Kareen, Jose, and Julie decide to do a little mining of their own to look for a lost motherlode of gold and treasure in a large cave and end up losing their way thanks to their very amateurish spelunking skills. The Danger Rangers are off to rescue the missing children and showing them that abandoned homes, dark caves, and certain places in the junkyard are no place to play. Things get worse when Mickey and Kareen end up in a competition with two greedy, bumbling prospectors and gold enthusiasts, Tall Tale Tim and Giles, to get the gold underneath Digger Diaz's house, with death traps aplenty and dangers abound underground. Can the Rangers get it through to both parties that their methods of finding the gold are putting their lives in danger?
10	"Chem Gems"	John Kafka	Sean Roche	Kyle A. Carrozza, Andrew Dickman, Greg Emison, Elaine Hultgren, Bob Nesler and Dave Rodriguez	"Poison" & "Don't Touch That"	July 14, 2006	110
When Scotland Yard is investigating who's currently been putting chemicals on London's streets, they assume it's the local toymaker Herbert Dinkwell. The Danger Rangers are called in to return to London and help prevent dangerous chemical combinations inadvertently done by the hands of some unsuspecting local British schoolchildren (collecting enough chemicals to make a stink bomb big enough to get out of their morning assembly) that nearly kill them. The Danger Rangers soon discover that Herbert's two disgruntled assistants, Lonnie and Jenkins, are responsible for improperly disposing of the chemicals by dumping them on the streets and in the River Thames instead of having them taken to the waste processing plant. And what is one of the suppliers doing with these jewels?
11	"Dog Days"	John Kafka	David Ehrman and Sean Roche	John Dorman and Bob Nesler	"Don't Startle a Dog" & "A Dog is a Love Sponge"	July 21, 2006	111
The Danger Rangers teach about the dangers of dog bites, how to avoid them, and how to approach dogs safely, as Burt makes a mechanical dog named Sparky for the dog show at the county fair. Two kids named Alice and Willie Buckster plan to get a dog of their own for the Pooch Parade, where they try to get the dog that Willie meets on the way to the school named Rufio.
12	"Be Prepared"	John Kafka	Unknown	Elaine Hultgren, Louis Scarborough and Byron Vaughns	"Be Prepared" & "Stay Calm"	July 28, 2006	112
Burble takes the Danger Rangers to the "Be Ready for Anything Jamboree" at the Pine Lake Orphanage (where Burble had grown up during his childhood) run by Mr. and Mrs. Barkster. A boy named Luke and his friend Danny end up in danger when Luke was perfecting wind surfing for Burble until a storm hits.
13	"Wet and Wild!"	John Kafka	Dave McDermott	Andrew Dickman, Bob Nesler, Louis Scarborough and Byron Vaughns	"You've Got to Think of Everyone Else" & "Learn to Swim"	August 4, 2006	113
The Danger Rangers take a cruise ship vacation and discuss water safety while helping a young girl named Alisha overcome her fear of water and dealing with calming down the hyperactive Brayski Brothers and their nephew Frantik. Meanwhile, Squeeky accidentally scares off a little girl who is trying to learn to swim, only to find herself caught up in the donkeys' antics.
14	"The Go Games"	John Kafka	Michael Maurer and Sean Roche	Andrew Dickman, Elaine Hultgren, Bob Nesler and Byron Vaughns	"Wear Your Helmet" & "Ride Smart"	August 11, 2006	114
Junior Danger Ranger Talya Mendoza sets out to shoot a movie about the Danger Rangers as they prepare for a bicycle, skateboarding, and rollerblading competition called the Go Games at Rivergrove Skate Park. Burt becomes the director to help out Talya. Meanwhile, local residents Chancy McSpill and his friend Duncan plan to use every dirty trick in the book to win the Go Games, even though Chancy isn't wearing a helmet and Duncan's helmet is too big for him. It's up to the Danger Rangers to thwart Chancy and Duncan's plot and set them straight.
15	"Kitty's Surprise Party!"	Jonathan Heidelberger and Urgen Radshev	Sean Roche	Ugren Radshev, Momchil Grozdanov, Stela Dorin and Dragomir Sholev	"False Alarms" (from "Fires and Liars") "Keep Yourself Safe" (from "Where the Fun Never Stops"), "Protect Your Ears" (from "Safe and Sound"), "Everybody Be Water Safe" (from "Water Works"), "When You're Coming Down That Slide" (from "Where the Fun Never Stops"), "Places Not to Play" (from "Cave Save"), "Wheels" (from "Wild Wheels"), "Common Sense" (from "Medicine Mix-Up")	August 18, 2006	115
In this clip show, the Danger Rangers have a surprise birthday party for Kitty and invite many of the children that she has helped over the years.
16	"Fallbot Forget-Me-Not!"	John Kafka	Sean Roche	Garrett Ho and Monte Young	"Don't Touch Them Pills" (from "Medicine Mix-Up"), "Rules of the Road" (from "Wild Wheels"), "Never Mess Around with Fire" (from "Fires and Liars"), "Poison" (from "Chem Gems"), "Use That Crosswalk" (from "The Great Race")	December 26, 2006	116
In this clip show, when Fallbot blows a circuit board and loses his memory during a thunderstorm, the Danger Rangers scramble to fix Fallbot's circuit board and reinstall the safety rules he used to know so well before his visit to Hoover Street Elementary School.

== Books ==
- Street Smarts
- Poison Patrol
- Blazin' Hot
- Cool by the Pool
- Free Wheelin'
- Danger Alert
- Attack of the Achoos
- Camping Caper
- Adventure Island

== Production ==
Douglas Smith and Michael Moore hired ProMedia of Knoxville, TN to develop a low-fidelity prototype that was used to conceptualize the aspirational goal of the animation. Chris West, an employee of ProMedia, was a valued contributing member of their team and was instrumental in developing the original prototype. After raising the necessary capital to produce the pilot episode, "Mission 547: Safety Rules", Smith and Moore traveled to Los Angeles where Jerry Houser, Larry Huber, Ginny McSwain, Howard Kazanjian and Ilie Agopian brought the pilot to life.

The first episode was completed in 2003. The show was created for the cause of children's safety and was the first show to successfully put Disney-quality productions into a quality curriculum. Danger Rangers was the most successfully distributed independent show on PBS affiliates.

== Broadcast ==
The series originally aired on PBS Kids under the American Public Television brand from 2005 to 2006. Reruns were distributed by Cookie Jar Entertainment and aired on CBS as part of Cookie Jar TV from September 2011 to September 2012, however, they were edited for commercial television purposes, which included having the epilogues of the episodes cut, resulting in showing 14 out of the 16 episodes only on that network.

== Business dealings and lawsuit ==
Educational Adventures (the original company behind the show) built distribution through grassroots efforts and deals with Virgin Atlantic and Safe Kids Worldwide. The assets of the company were eventually lost in a lawsuit after the liquidation of the company. This left Mike D. Moore to seek to regain control and restart the show.
