= Care Bears: Adventures in Care-a-lot =

American animated television series

- Genre: Animated series
- Based on: Care Bears: Oopsy Does It!
- Written by: Thomas D. Hart
- Directed by: Davis Doi
- Voices of: Tabitha St. Germain; Tracey Moore; Ian James Corlett; Scott McNeil; Ashleigh Ball
- Opening theme: "We Are the Care Bears" performed by Kay Hanley
- Composers: Carl Johnson (score); Andy Street (songs: music); Judy Rothman (songs: lyrics)
- Country of origin: United States
- Original language: English
- No. of seasons: 2
- No. of episodes: 26 (52 segments)

Production
- Executive producers: Andy Heyward; Jonathan Dern; Paul Sabella; Brad Hood; Jeffrey Conrad; David Polter; Margaret Loesch; Sean Gorman
- Producer: Robert Winthrop
- Running time: 21 minutes
- Production companies: American Greetings; American Greetings Properties; SD Entertainment

Original release
- Network: CBS
- Release: September 15, 2007 – November 2, 2010

Related
- The Care Bears Family; Care Bears: Welcome to Care-a-Lot

Care Bears: Adventures in Care-a-Lot is an American children's animated television series based on the Care Bears franchise produced by American Greetings Properties and animated by SD Entertainment. (Note: Animation outsourced to Wang Film Productions and Hong Ying Animation.) The series functions as part of the fourth incarnation of the franchise, and centers on the adventures and escapades of the titular Care Bears - Cheer, Share, Grumpy, Funshine, and Oopsy, as they help their fellow Care Bear friends and battle against the main antagonist Grizzle.

The series originally aired on CBS as part of the network's KEWLopolis strand (which itself was co-run by American Greetings) from September 2007 until November 2008, with reruns airing until September 12, 2009. Along with the other shows in the KEWLopolis block, this series fulfilled the federal "E/I" requirements. The series officially began with a computer-animated pilot movie entitled Care Bears: Oopsy Does It! which saw a limited theatrical release in the United States in August 2007. Four half-hour specials were released straight to DVD in 2008, and this was followed up with three additional computer-animated films in 2010 part of a miniseries entitled the "Care Power Team".

== Premise ==
While other Care Bears make occasional appearances in the show, the series primarily focuses on five Care Bears in particular: Cheer Bear, the new leader of the group, Share Bear, who's now a horticulturist, Grumpy Bear, now an inventor, Funshine Bear, now an energetic fun bear instead of a jokester, and introduced in Care Bears: Oopsy Does It!, Oopsy Bear. In this version, the Care Bears are shown as much more energetic and playful, but also function as adults with responsibilities such as having jobs, living independently and taking care of the little cubs, Hugs and Tugs. The show's theme song is performed by Kay Hanley.

Unlike the previous animation created by DIC and Nelvana in the 1980s, and as with Care Bears: Oopsy Does It!, this series features the new redesigned Care Bears with redesigned tummy symbols (renamed to "belly badges"). It also features a redesigned Care-a-lot. Additionally, there was initially no interaction with humans or other supernatural entities like those found in the previous iteration until later episodes. Instead, as an immediate follow-up to Care Bears: Oopsy Does It!, the series inherits the sole villain from the movie, Grizzle, who has robots to do his bidding.

== Characters ==
=== Main ===
- Cheer Bear (voiced by Tabitha St. Germain) is optimistic, outgoing and intelligent. She has carnation pink fur with a rainbow as her belly badge and wears a rainbow-colored bow. She also appears to have a good deal of medical knowledge, as seen in the episodes "Care-Ful Bear", "Bubbles" and "King Grumpy". She's the main care taker of the cubs, as seen in the episode "Night Shift", being a mother-like figure to them.
- Share Bear (voiced by Tracey Moore) has an innocent, naive, and airheaded demeanor. She is a horticulturist, often growing flowers in a garden she owns (along with a knowledge about them), and always carries a purse full of lollipops to share with her fellow Care Bear friends. She has lavender fur and has two lollipops crossed like an X as her belly badge. She also works at the Sweetheart Shop as seen in the episodes "Harmony: Unplugged" and in "Share and Share Alike".
- Funshine Bear (voiced by Ian James Corlett) is determined and active. He often gets hooked on an idea and rarely lets go (as seen in the episodes "Care-ful Bear" and "Rainshine Meadows"). He is somewhat overconfident, which sometimes gets him into trouble. He has sunshine yellow fur with a sun as his belly badge and wears a red baseball cap. He's usually in charge of organizing games for events like in the episodes "Cheer, There And Everywhere" and "Care-Ful Bear".
- Grumpy Bear (voiced by Scott McNeil) is cynical, bitter and fairly blunt, yet he is a prolific inventor by creating gizmos and gadgets intended to make a Care Bear's life easier, although some of his gadgets are absolutely nonsense (for example, he was working on a rainbow-powered windmill in the episode "All You Need Is..."). Whenever Oopsy makes accidents on him or his property, he utters phrases like, "Bumbling Blizterbugs!" and "Typhonic Typhoons!" He is sky blue and his belly badge is a rain cloud with raindrops shaped like hearts.
- Oopsy Bear (voiced by Ashleigh Ball) is clumsy and accident-prone. He is light green and, unlike the other Care Bears, doesn't have a belly badge; he usually draws on his belly with a special belly badge crayon, often that of a shooting star, although he can erase it and change it according to his feelings. He's usually working with Grumpy Bear as an assistant, as seen in episodes like "All You Need Is...", "Grizzle-ized" and "Desperately Seeking Mr. Beaks" or just helping others around Care-a-Lot.

=== Villains ===
- Grizzle (voiced by Mark Oliver) is the main villain that resembles a brown wicked Bear and wears a big metal suit. He hates the Care Bears because he doesn't understand what all of their caring is for, and wishes to take over Care-a-lot. He usually deploys robots or uses strange contraptions to carry out his dirty deeds, but it usually backfires on him. He exhibits megalomania, delusions of grandeur, and symptoms of mild schizophrenia, as he often seen talking to an inanimate bird made of spare parts named "Mr. Beaks" and replying to it as if it were speaking.
- UR-2 (voiced by Ron Halder) is one of Grizzle's robots. He is a very snarky and intelligent, suave robot who's dressed like a butler. He wears a indigo robot suit and black bow tie. He can change his hand into a wrench (as seen in the episode "A Little Help") and does not have feet at all, instead, he just floats around.
- Sergeant Rocketbottom is another one of Grizzle's robots. He is dumb, a little airheaded and tends to take words literally. He is dressed like an army sergeant and looks very human-like. He also appears to be poorly made, as he often has parts falling off.

=== Supporting ===
- Wingnut (voiced by Nathan Wallace) was originally built by Grizzle to function as an aide in Grizzle's Lair. However, by the end of the movie Oopsy Does It!, he has defected to the Care Bears' side. True to his name, a large Wingnut can be found on his head. He lives with Oopsy and is also usually found by Oopsy's side and also with Share in some episodes, if not occupied helping Grumpy out or playing with Funshine. Wingnut is equipped with Hammerspace storage to store various items that he or the other bears may need in the episode, such as pulling out a leafblower that's the same size as he is. He can also use the same compartment to analyze unknown substances.
- Tenderheart Bear (voiced by Matt Hill), an excellent ball player, is a bit of a daredevil. He is a good friend of Funshine. He has brown-orange fur, and has a red heart belly badge. He also wears a red heart-shaped backpack.
- Harmony Bear (voiced by Andrea Libman) believes that, like the colors of the rainbow, many different people can come together to make something beautiful. She works at the SweetHeart SweetShop, and has a knack for creating outrageous new candies. Her fur color is violet and her belly badge is of a smiley-faced flower with different colored petals. She also wears a pink headband.
- True Heart Bear (voiced by Stevie Vallance), the town's reporter and runner of the "Heroes of Care-a-Lot" website, she usually carries a laptop computer with wireless network connection and a digital camera around (seen in the episodes "Rainshine Meadows" and "Oopsy the Hero"). She is a pastel pink bear and her belly badge is of a heart with triangle petal shapes around it. She tends to write in purple prose. Unlike others, she is voiced by Unknown in the UK dub of the series.
- Wish Bear (voiced by Chiara Zanni) is very close to the Whishing Stars and is shown to understand them more than the other bears, as has been shown in the episodes "Cheer, There and Everywhere" and "Twinklet". She has her own Whishing Star friend, Twinkers and she can sometimes be shown with Grumpy Bear. She is a light turquoise bear and her belly badge is a shooting star. She also wears a yellow star-shaped barrette on her hair.
- Bedtime Bear (voiced by Richard Ian Cox) is usually asleep when the other bears are up (waking up for only short moments to share his thoughts before drifting back to slumber during the day). However, he is fully awake at nighttime where he totes a lantern and functions as Care-a-Lot's night "watchbear", making sure everyone is sleeping when they should (such as in the episodes "Belly Ball" and "Bubbles"). He is an aqua blue bear and his belly badge is a snoozing crescent moon with a small star. He also wears a purple & yellow night cap and white slippers.
- Surprise Bear (voiced by Kelly Sheridan) loves and enjoys being surprised, such as in the episodes "Erased" and "Unbearable", or surprising the other bears, such as in the episodes "All You Need Is..." and "Gobblebugs". She often pops up in unexpected places. She is an amethyst purple bear and her belly badge is a star popping out of a jack-in-the-box.
- Love-a-Lot Bear (voiced by Terri Hawkes) is a bear who works in the Smart Heart Library as the librarian, where the other bears go if they have questions or if they needed some quiet time. She is a magenta pink bear and her belly badge is two intertwining hearts. She also wears a barrette in her hair that matches her belly badge and a purple scarf. When she speaks, she punctuates everything with the word "love" or a variation of such.
- Good Luck Bear (voiced by Samuel Vincent) works at the Smart Heart Library as a shelver (as seen in the episode "Luck O' the Oopsy"). However, he can also be seen in the episodes "A Little Help" and "Tell Tale Tummy", where he helps the other bears prepare for the celebration. He is a shamrock green bear with a shamrock belly badge.
- Amigo Bear (voiced by Samuel Vincent) is the ice-cream vendor in Care-a-Lot, providing refreshments at the meadows or near the gathering tree where the bears play. He is a red-orange bear with a tropical sun flower for his belly badge. True to his name, he speaks with a Hispanic accent and often uses Spanish words (meaning he can speak Latin Spanish).
- Best Friend Bear (voiced by Brittney Wilson) works at the Grocery Store (as seen in the episode "Luck 'O Oopsy") and is a very helpful bear who believes friends are forever. She is an orchid bear and her belly badge is a heart and star connected by a rainbow.
- Laugh-a-Lot Bear (voiced by Adrienne Carter) is a bear who loves making the others laugh. She is a dark orange bear and her belly badge is a smiling star with three pink hearts.
- Friend Bear (voiced by Shannon Chan-Kent) is a yellow-orange bear with a flower in her hair and a belly badge showing two intertwining sunflowers. She appears in the episodes "Present and Accounted For", "Flower Power", "Cheer, There, and Everywhere", and "Stand Up and Cheer".
- Champ Bear (voiced by (voiced by Kirby Morrow) is a very sporty, royal blue bear with a trophy belly badge.
- Baby Hugs is a baby pink bear that lives with her twin brother Tugs at Cheer's house.
- Baby Tugs is a baby blue bear that lives with his twin sister Hugs at Cheer's house.
- McKenna (voiced by Chantal Strand) is a human little girl who is often brought to Care-A-Lot by the main cast to learn lessons on caring in a few episodes of the second season.
- Bumpity (voiced by Garry Chalk) and Tweazle (voiced by Shannon Chan-Kent) are cloud-like creatures also known as the Nimbits. They often try to help the Care Bears, but it usually goes wrong. Tweazle is small and carnation pink, she's usually the one who suggests ideas to try to help the Care Bears; while Bumpity, who is big and sky blue, tends to follow along whatever ideas Tweazle has. They attend Cloud School and they both have shapeshifting abilities and unstable weather powers; being able to create rain, fog, funnel clouds and other phenomena that sometimes tend to affect the emotions and behavior of others.
- Professor Cumulus is the elderly cloud teacher of Cloud School. He is a large baby blue cloud with the face of an old man and small round glasses. Unlike Bumpity and Tweazle, he looks more like a regular cloud although he also appears to be a nimbette.
- Emma (voiced by Andrea Libman) is a Hispanic human little girl who's good at finding things. She is the youngest of her siblings; having three older brothers named Luis, Jorge, and Daniel.
- Jake (voiced by unknown) is a human boy who just moved into a new town and is missing his old friends, Funshine goes to Earth to help him make new friends and to teach him that fun is everywhere if he knows where to look for it.

== Care-a-lot ==
The new Care-a-Lot has five main places that make it up:

- Central Care-a-lot, basically the place where most of the show takes place, this hosts the Gathering tree and all of the houses of the main cast, and Harmony's Sweet Shop, Smart Heart Library and Care-a-lot Cafe.
- Waterfall Cloud is the Care Bears' favorite place to play. It has a waterfall, stream, and a large meadow called Cloud Hill. Cheer refers to the meadow by its name in the episode "Cheer, There and Everywhere". Waterfall Cloud's name is mentioned first in "Rainshine Meadows" and then again in "Gobblebugs".
- Rainshine Meadows, Rainshine Meadows first appeared in the episode of the same name, where Funshine goes to Rainshine Meadows to practice his Belly Ball moves, and he finds it a mess. After a big storm the once beautiful place was ruined, but by the end of the episode, everything is cleaned up and the place is restored. If it appears in more episodes is unknown, due to the fact it looks a lot like the Meadow. Rainshine Meadows is accessed from behind the waterfall from the meadow where the bears usually play.
- Grizzle's Lair, A place where Grizzle lives above Care-a-lot and plots all of his evil plans. It is a floating fortress built from scrap metal, Grizzle one time describes it as "a castle in the clouds" in the episode "Forget It".
- WooHoo World is an amusement park within Care-a-Lot constructed by Oopsy, Cheer, Funshine, Share, and Grumpy in the movie Care Bears: Oopsy Does It! This location is seen in the show in the episodes "Belly Ball" and "Twinklet".

== Houses and buildings ==
The houses in Care-a-lot are very different, but they all show the personalities of their owners:

- Oopsy's upside-down House: Oopsy's house resembles a building that had been flipped over, therefore the door is at the top, even with the decorative edging at the top that the other Care Bears have on the bottom of their houses. He lives to the right of Grumpy's Garage/Shop.
- Cheer's House Is pink with heart-shaped windows. It is to the left of Funshine's house, and to the right of the Grocery Store.
- Grumpy's Garage/Shop: The main part of Grumpy's house is the Garage/Shop where he does all of his work. The inside and outside of his house is blue and it is adorned with thunderbolts. Right above the door to his garage is a 2D flipped out umbrella. The inside of his Garage it holds his tools, a broom, a ladder, a work bench, etc. His house is to the right of Share's and to the Left of Oopsy's.
- Share's Garden: Share's garden is her pride and joy and she keeps it very well. It is mostly full of Lollipop flowers that look like the Lollipops on her Belly Badge. Her house is to the Left of Grumpy's and the right of Funshine's.
- Funshine's Fun-House: Funshine's many colored house has a pink/red slide coming out of his bedroom window. Funshine's room is seen in the episode "Bubbles" and only has a bed, but in the episode "Unbearable" it has a fireman's pole and a bedstand. In the episode "Cheer Up" we see Funshine's living room which is pretty empty. His house is to the left of Share's.
- Sweetheart Shop: Harmony Bear is seen running a candy parlor in the episode "Cheer, There and Everywhere") where she creates all manner of sweets. Share Bear also appears to work here, as seen in the episodes "Share and Share Alike" and "Harmony: Unplugged". The name of the parlor was eventually revealed in the episode "Share And Share Alike".
- Smart Heart Library: Love-a-Lot works at the library, but it is unclear if she's the head librarian or not. Commonly, the bears go to the library to find answers to questions they have (i.e. Funshine in the episode "Rainshine Meadows") or have some quiet time (i.e. Cheer and Harmony in Oopsy the Hero). This library is apparently named after Smart Heart Bear (who loves school and learning) but she has never appeared in this series.
- Care-a-lot Cafe: Care-a-lot's local "cafe" has not been "announced" as a place in Care-a-lot yet, but it has been seen in the background. It is unclear of who works/owns the place. It is also possible that this place is an annexe of Sweetheart Candy Parlor.
- Grocery Store: Best Friend Bear can be seen working as a cashier here in "Luck O' the Oopsy". This building is blue with pink hearts on it. It can be seen to the right of the Care-a-Lot Cafe, and to the left of Cheer's house.
- Bedtime Bear's House is first seen in the episode "Care-Ful Bear". His house is varying shades of blue and has a nightcap-like structure build over a tower on it. Bedtime's house is located in Waterfall Cloud, as seen in the episode "Good Knight Bedtime".
- Best Friend Bear's House is seen in the episode "Oopsy the Hero". Share runs past Cheer's house and then past Sweetheart Shop before arriving at Best Friend Bear's home. Despite this, it is never shown on the Central Care-a-Lot map.
- Harmony's Cottage is seen in the episode "Care-Ful Bear". Her house is small with flowers painted around the windows. It is never shown on the map of Central Care-a-Lot.
- Love-a-Lot's House is shown in the episode "Present and Accounted for". It is pink with heart-shaped windows. It is never shown on the map of Central Care-a-Lot.
- Surprise Bear's House is seen in the episode "Care-Ful Bear". Her house is two stores with a jack-in-the-box like structure on the top of it. It is never shown on the map of Central Care-a-Lot

== Episodes ==
Season	Episodes	Originally released	
Season	Episodes	First released	Last released
Pilot		August 4, 2007	
Season 1	13	September 15, 2007	December 8, 2008
Season 2	13	September 13, 2008	November 22, 2008
Care Power Team	3	March 10, 2010	November 2, 2010

=== Theatrical pilot (2007) ===
Title	Directed by	Written by	Original release date
"Oopsy Does It!"	Davis Doi	Jill Gorey, Barbara Herndon & Thomas Hart	August 4, 2007
Grizzle plans to conquer Care-a-Lot by taking all the belly badges off all the Care Bears and using those belly badges.

=== Season 1 (2007–08) ===
No.	Title	Directed by	Written by	Original release date
1	"A Little Help / Tell-Tale Tummy"	Mike Roth	Unknown	September 15, 2007
A Little Help: To stop his lab from losing power and floating away, Grizzle tries to steal a power generator that Grumpy Bear invented while the town is preparing for a festival. Tell-Tale Tummy: Share Bear breaks Grumpy Bear's cloud express, which was still a work in progress, and gets the butterflies while trying to hide the fact that she broke it from Grumpy.
2	"Care-Ful Bear / A Case of the Grumpies"	Mike Roth	Unknown	September 22, 2007
Care-Ful Bear: After Share Bear gets into a minor accident, Funshine Bear decides to enforce safety and becomes Care-Ful bear. Unfortunately, his enforcement is spoiling everyone's fun. A Case of the Grumpies: Grumpy Bear is grumpier than usual as of late, and Cheer Bear tries to cheer him up.
3	"Ice Creamed / Heatwave"	Mike Roth	Unknown	September 29, 2007
Ice Creamed: Grumpy Bear builds a mechanical ice cream cart that produces unlimited ice cream for Amigo Bear after Grizzle destroys Amigo Bear's old ice cream cart. Unfortunately, it ends up producing too much ice cream. Heatwave: Grizzle is using a device that consists of a pair of magnifying glasses to cause a heatwave in Care-a-Lot. The Thunder whales come by to bring rain, but then Grizzle scares them off. It's up to Share Bear, who's afraid of the whales, to save Care-a-Lot by facing her fears and leading the whales back.
4	"Erased / Unbearable"	Mike Roth	Unknown	October 6, 2007
Erased: Grizzle has invented a robot named Newbie and fitted it with a badge removal ray emitter to try erasing the Care Bears' belly badges. Unfortunately, the ray amplifies the negative traits of the bears instead of removing them. Soon, all in Care-a-Lot is in chaos and only Oopsy, who doesn't have a real belly badge and thus have not been zapped by the robot, can save the day. Unbearable: Because of Funshine's helpful nature, the bears awards him with a trophy. However, the trophy soon gets to his head.
5	"Belly Ball / Bubbles"	Mike Roth	Unknown	October 13, 2007
Belly Ball: Share Bear wants to be good at a new game called Belly Ball. She's hoping it will help her out for a visit to Woohoo World, but becomes obsessed with winning a ribbon. Share stays up so late practicing that she neglects her sleep and can't play well at the game at all. Bubbles: Funshine has also been staying up late to have fun, and ends up catching the "bubbles." These bubble-hiccups cause him to float up in the air. His friends tell him he has to stay in bed, but Funshine keeps getting up because he doesn't want to miss out on any fun.
6	"Cheer, There and Everywhere / Twinklet"	Carson Kugler	Eugene Son Unknown	October 20, 2007
Cheer, There And Everywhere: Cheer Bear neglects her duties to help out others during the parade. Twinklet: Oopsy finds a twinklet and decides to keep it.
7	"Growing Pains / King Grumpy"	Larry Houston	Unknown	October 27, 2007
Growing Pains: Share Bear and Cheer Bear battle it out for the best garden in Care-a-Lot, but both go too far. King Grumpy: Wingnut accidentally hurts Grumpy to which Grumpy takes advantage of him.
8	"All You Need Is... / Gobblebugs"	Larry Houston	Unknown	November 3, 2007
All You Need Is...: Due to a slip-up, a bottle of love perfume belonging to Grizzle, which causes anyone who sniffs the scent of the wearer to fall madly in love with the wearer of the perfume, ends up with Oopsy. Oopsy uses the perfume, which makes everyone in Care-a-Lot fall heads over heels with him. Gobblebugs: A swarm of destructive insects called "gobblebugs" have descended upon Care-a-Lot. Cheer and Oopsy save the day and chases the Gobblebugs away.
9	"Rainshine Meadows / Oopsy The Hero"	Kent Osborne	Unknown	November 10, 2007
Rainshine Meadows: Funshine looks for a place to practice Belly Ball and happens upon Rainshine Meadows, a once beautiful place which is now in a state of despair and negligence. Oopsy The Hero: Oopsy laments that he feels like he needs more attention. However, when his clumsiness saves Cheer and Harmony from a falling sign, he becomes a town hero.
10	"Grizzle-ized / Share and Share Alike"	Davis Doi	Unknown	November 17, 2007
Grizzle-ized: Grizzle has invented a new invention called the "Grizzle-ator," which he intends to use to turn all of Care-a-Lot into a replica of his lair. He needs, however, a bear to deliver it into Care-a-Lot without anyone suspecting what it really is. Share and Share Alike: Share Bear has been growing special plants in her garden to make "Rootbear", a special root-beer that allows the bears to float into the sky. However, when she makes the drink, she finds that there isn't enough for her.
11	"Dare Bears / Battle of the Bands"	Larry Houston	Unknown	November 24, 2007
Dare Bears: After trying out Grumpy's new "bouncy boots" invention, Tenderheart and Funshine want more ways to have fun and decide to start taking dares. However, the fun they end up having ends up causing them to get into trouble. Battle of the Bands: When Harmony, Cheer, True Heart and Share form a band, their playing disturbs Grizzle's sleep. He dons a wig and lipstick and becomes Busybody Bear, allegedly having come to Care-a-Lot to pay a visit to an old friend. Under this guise, he begins spreading rumors that the various members of the band are saying nasty things about each other.
12	"Re-Booted / Flower Power"	Larry Houston	Unknown	December 1, 2007
Re-Booted: A robot that Grizzle creates kicks the villain out of his lair. Flower Power: Share has grown some lovely flowers and wants to share them with all of the Care Bears. Just then, the nimbits Tweazle and Bumpity arrive. They decide to create a special rain to increase the flowers' power and enhance everyone's appreciation of them, but none of them realize that they've accidentally created a flurry of jealousy.
13	"Two of a Kind / Stand Up and Cheer"	Larry Houston Davis Doi	Unknown	December 8, 2007
Two of a Kind: Grumpy is having a problem with a new machine and agrees to let his friends help. When it seems like they're just getting in his way, however, he unceremoniously tosses them out of his workshop. He instead turns to another machine, creating duplicates of himself, only to find that they're too busy arguing to help him at all. Tossed out of his own workshop, Grumpy finds himself turning to those whose help he shunned before. Stand Up and Cheer: Noticing how talented the Care Bears all are, Cheer decides to hold a talent show. Soon, everyone is getting together great acts, and even Grizzle puts together one, though his act is part of another scheme to take over Care-a-lot. Meanwhile, Cheer helps everyone with their acts, but has trouble coming up with a performance of her own.
14	"Broken"	Davis Doi	Thomas D. Hart	February 5, 2008 (DVD); November 29, 2008 (CBS)
As the Care Bears hold a celebration for Wingnut, Grizzle fumes over the loss of his robotic assistant who has "turned traitor." He's not sure how, but he's determined to make the Care Bears and Wingnut pay. Later on, as Share Bear is teaching Wingnut about caring, an accident happens and Wingnut is broken. The only choice that the Bears have this time is by letting Grizzle fix Wingnut, but can the Bears trust him? Note: This episode is the first of the Grizzle-ly Adventures specials, which were first featured on DVD.
15	"Emma's Dilemma"	Davis Doi	Thomas D. Hart	February 5, 2008 (DVD); December 6, 2008 (CBS)
As the Care Bears experience a rash of disappearing personal items, they receive an alert from their Care Bear Transporter. A girl on Earth named Emma is in trouble and needs their help. Her caring quotient has dropped dangerously low after her brothers refused to play with her. The Care Bears decide to bring her to Care-a-Lot, in the hope they can boost her confidence by having her find their lost things. They don't know, however, that they've landed her right in the middle of one of Grizzle's evil plans. Grizzle has been stealing their items in the hopes of finding out what makes them tick. He's now set his sights on actually capturing a Care Bear and analyzing it. Note: This episode is the second of the Grizzle-ly Adventures specials, which were first featured on DVD.
16	"Cheer Up"	Davis Doi	Thomas D. Hart	May 13, 2008 (DVD)
Cheer wants to hold a surprise party for Surprise Bear, but she begins to get frustrated when she tries to hide away the evidence. Note: This episode is the first of the Ups and Downs specials, which are DVD-exclusive episodes.
17	"Down to Earth"	Davis Doi	Thomas D. Hart	May 13, 2008 (DVD)
A boy named Jake has moved to a new town and is missing his old friends. Funshine travels to Jake's hometown and shows him how well it can be to make new friends. Note: This episode is the second of the Ups and Downs specials, which are DVD-exclusive episodes.

=== Season 2 (2008) ===
#	Title	Director	Writer	Original air date
18	"Bumpity & Tweazle / Here Comes McKenna"	Unknown	Unknown	September 13, 2008
Bumpity & Tweazle: As the Care Bears start their annual spring cleaning, Oopsy finds himself bothered by an odd problem: he thinks that he's seeing duplicates of his friends. The "duplicates" turn out to be Bumpity and Tweazle, shape-shifting clouds called nimbits who weren't sure how to fit into Care-a-Lot. The Care Bears try their best to make them feel welcome. Here Comes McKenna: The Care Bears have been trying to help a girl named McKenna, but find her to be a tough case. They decide to transport her to Care-a-Lot in the hope of teaching her more about sharing and caring. Once there, McKenna starts to act reformed, but secretly hatches her own plan. Then, Grizzle shows up with a new version of his Care-taker device, forcing McKenna to make a tough decision.
19	"Whose Friend Is Who? / Present and Accounted For"	Unknown	Unknown	September 21, 2008
Whose Friend Is Who?: McKenna makes another appearance in Care-a-Lot. Upon arrival she helps Cheer, Harmony and Love-a-Lot with a big project. Grumpy, Funshine, and Oopsy are left out of the project making them jealous. They decide to start their own project, leaving the girls out. McKenna is caught in the middle of a veritable boys club vs. girls club forcing her to try to reconcile the two groups. Present and Accounted For: Care-a-Lot celebrates Love-a-Lot's birthday, and Cheer plans a big gift-basket surprise for Love-a-Lot, but the gifts are mysteriously stolen. Love-a-Lot is frustrated at Cheer for forgetting about her birthday, while Cheer thinks Love-a-Lot ungratefully took the basket without showing appreciation.
20	"Surprise Day / Tempus Fugit"	Unknown	Unknown	September 27, 2008
Surprise Day: On Surprise Day, Harmony Bear is unnerved because it's her least favorite holiday. Though the other Care Bears all love surprising their friends and getting surprised on the holiday, Harmony feels jittery about all the unexpected things happening. When Share gives her a surprise, she lashes out and then shuts herself inside. Tempus Fugit: The Care Bears are so busy with work that they haven't had much time for play lately. When they all politely decline Bumpity and Tweazles' invitation to join in games, Bumpity and Tweazle look for a way to speed up their work.
21	"Desperately Seeking Mr. Beaks / Good Knight Bedtime"	Unknown	Unknown	September 28, 2008
Desperately Seeking Mr. Beaks: When Grizzle loses Mr. Beaks, he leaps to the worst conclusion that his pal has been stolen by the Care Bears. The Care Bears don't agree with his conclusion but agree to help anyway. Good Knight Bedtime: When Grizzle invents a "dream scheme machine," not even the Care Bears' nocturnal slumberings are safe from his evil designs. At first, the device is set only to low power, but when Grizzle cranks it all the way, the Care Bears find themselves trapped in a giant nightmare world.
22	"True Heart's Big Trip / Bumbleberry Jammed"	Unknown	Unknown	September 30, 2008
Trueheart's Big Trip: True Heart trips and is teased. Bumbleberry Jammed: Grumpy finds a special Bumbleberry bush and refuses to share.
23	"Harmony Unplugged / King of the Gobblebugs"	Unknown	Unknown	October 18, 2008
Harmony Unplugged: Harmony has the most lovely voice in Care-a-Lot, but when True Heart plans a big concert for Harmony to sing, all the extra attention begins to go to Harmony's head. Now, True Heart must deal with an unruly and ungrateful friend, and hope to correct the misdeeds of the monster she created. King of the Gobblebugs: As the Care Bears sit around the campfire telling stories, it comes to Oopsy's turn, and he cannot think of anything as good as anyone else's. Oopsy decides to tell a tale that is a bit taller than all of the other Care Bears, telling of an encounter he had in Rainshine Meadows with a giant Gobblebug as big as him, however, the other Bears take his story a bit too seriously.
24	"Night Shift / No Snow Day"	Unknown	Unknown	October 25, 2008
Night Shift: Bedtime allows Funshine, Tenderheart and Oopsy to accompany him on a typical work shift, which includes helping Hugs and Tugs get to sleep and keep everyone's dreams running smoothly. No Snow Day: Bumpity and Tweazle try to create winter conditions to allow the Care Bears and McKenna to enjoy winter activities, but they accidentally create No Snow, an opposite form of snow that can invert one's attitude (positive to negative and vice versa).
25	"Luck O' the Oopsy / Rudemate"	Unknown	Unknown	November 5, 2008
Luck O' the Oopsy: After several mishaps while preparing for a race, Oopsy believes himself to be bad luck until he receives the idea to get a four leaf clover after seeing Good Luck Bear. Rudemate: McKenna is invited to stay in Care-a-Lot for a while, but she's not the best house guest.
26	"Belly Blanked / All Give & No Take"	Unknown	Unknown	November 13, 2008
Belly Blanked: Grizzle has created another device to steal the Care Bears belly badges and uses it on Funshine. All Give & No Take: McKenna is taught about the joys of giving, and Grizzle gives the Care Bears a gift and invites them to his lair for a larger gift--one he intends to use to trap them.
27	"Tour de Farce / Bad News"	Unknown	Unknown	November 15, 2008
Tour de Farce: McKenna and the other Care Bears help Grumpy get over his fear of riding a bicycle. Bad News: True Heart and Share decide to become full-time reporters, and end up on the verge of becoming tabloid reporters.
28	"Forget It / Gone"	Unknown	Unknown	November 22, 2008
Forget It: Tenderheart gets a new pogo stick from Grumpy and insists on Funshine trying it, despite Funshine's insistence that he's not ready for it. When Funshine breaks the pogo stick, they both blame each other for the problem. Grizzle then uses a new machine on them, which makes them forget about why they were angry. Gone: McKenna's friend Heather has moved away. The Care Bears bring Mckenna to Care-a-lot to see the Thunder Whales and it ends up helping McKenna feel better about Heather's absence after helping a Thunder Whale calf.

=== Care Power Team movies (2010) ===
#	Title	Director	Writer	Original air date
1	"Share Bear Shines"	Larry Houston	Thomas D. Hart	March 10, 2010 (Australia); November 6, 2010 (DVD)
2	"To the Rescue"	Larry Houston & Davis Doi	Unknown	April 3, 2010 (DVD)
3	"The Giving Festival"	Larry Houston	Thomas D. Hart	November 2, 2010 (DVD)

== DVD release ==
In 2008, 20th Century Fox Home Entertainment released two DVDs of the series which contained double-length episodes from the second season which didn't air on TV at the time of release. "Grizzle-ly Adventures", released in February 2008 contained “Emma's Dilemma” and “Broken”; while "Ups and Downs", released in May 2008 contained “Cheer Up” and “Down to Earth”.

In 2009, Lionsgate Home Entertainment took over DVD distribution of the series under a new deal with American Greetings, and in March 2009, released their first DVD for the series titled "Cheer, There and Everywhere". The company would continue on to release DVDs of the series which all focus on specific morals.

Many of these releases have also been released on digital download.

DVD name	Episodes	Distributor	Release date	Moral
Grizzle-ly Adventures	"Emma's Dilemma" "Broken"	20th Century Fox Home Entertainment	February 5, 2008	
Ups and Downs	"Cheer Up" "Down to Earth"	20th Century Fox Home Entertainment	May 6, 2008	
Cheer, There & Everywhere	"Growing Pains" "King Grumpy" "Cheer, There & Everywhere" "A Case of the Grumpies" "Gobblebugs" "Grizzle-ized" "Two of a Kind" "Stand Up and Cheer"	Lionsgate Home Entertainment	March 24, 2009	Getting Along with Others
Tell-Tale Tummies	"The Tell-Tale Tummy" "Oopsy the Hero" "Bumbleberry Jammed"; Desperately Seeking Mr. Beaks" "King of the Gobblebugs" "Bad News" "Tour de Farce" "No-Snow Day"	Lionsgate Home Entertainment	June 9, 2009	Telling the Truth
Bear Buddies	"Belly Ball" "All You Need Is..." "Battle of the Band" "Whose Friend Is Who" "Present and Accounted For" "Forget It" "Gone" "True Heart's Big Trip"	Lionsgate Home Entertainment	September 22, 2009	Value of Friendship
Helping Hearts	"Ice Creamed" "A Little Help"; Unbearable" "Twinklet" "Rainshine Meadows" "Care-ful Bear" "Rudemate"; Dare Bears"	Lionsgate Home Entertainment	January 12, 2010	Helping Others
Share-a-Lot in Care-a-Lot	"Re-Booted" "Tempus Fugits" "Share and Share Alike" "Here Comes McKenna" "Night Shift" "All Give and No Take" "Bumpity and Tweazie" "Surprise Day"	Lionsgate Home Entertainment	May 4, 2010	Sharing and Caring
Flower Power	"Flower Power" "Luck O' the Oopsy" "Heatwave" "Erased" "Bubbles" "Harmony Unplugged" "Belly Blanked" "Good Knight Bedtime"	Lionsgate Home Entertainment	June 7, 2011	Believing in Yourself
