= 4Real =

American television series, 2007–2008

- Created by: Sol Guy
- Written by: Shoshana Guy; Sol Guy; Josh Thorne
- Directed by: Shoshana Guy; Josh Thorne
- No. of seasons: 1
- No. of episodes: 8

Original release
- Network: MTV Canada
- Release: December 25 – December 27, 2007

4Real (stylized as 4REAL) is a reality television series, whose eight episodes were broadcast on MTV Canada during the 2007–2008 season. The series' main theme was having celebrity guests visit local communities to discuss local and global challenges, for example, having Joaquin Phoenix visit the Brazilian rainforest to discuss contemporary challenges with a local chieftain (Episode 1). The series was produced by Direct Current Media.

Celebrity guests of 4REAL season 1 are Cameron Diaz, Mos Def, Joaquin Phoenix, Eva Mendes, Casey Affleck, K'naan, M.I.A. and Flea.

== History ==
4REAL was founded by its producer, Josh Thome, when he was invited to the Global Leadership Jam in 2000, an event that brought together 30 young leaders from around the world. The rationale was to take celebrities (and audiences) to these young leaders while offering ways for people to contribute to their initiatives.

After three more years of development and production adventures around the world, Josh and Sol landed a broadcast deal with CTV in 2006. Joaquin Phoenix agreed to be the celebrity guest for the first 4REAL episode featuring the Yawanawa community in the Amazon. After this, Phoenix joined the team as an Executive Producer to recruit other celebrity guests.

== Episodes ==
- 4REAL Yawanawa - Joaquin Phoenix journeys into the heart of the Amazon Rainforest, to visit the Yawanawa, an indigenous tribe
- 4REAL City of God - Mos Def travels to Rio's "City Of God" where Brazilian rap artist, MV Bill, shows how his program working with favela youth through hip hop culture and educational opportunities.
- 4REAL Liberia - UK rapper/artist M.I.A. learns about the work of child rights leader Kimmie Weeks. They visit with Liberian President Ellen Johnson Sirleaf, fix a playground and throw a block party in Monrovia.
- 4REAL Kenya - Hip hop star K'naan travels to Kenya's Kibera, the largest slum in East Africa. There, he connects with local volunteer, Salim Mohamed, who runs a medical clinic and a soccer program for over 4,000 kids.
- 4REAL Aiti - In the hills of Aiti, Flea of Red Hot Chili Peppers meets rural health aide, Camseuze Moise, who provides medical care and health education to thousands of people.
- 4REAL Peru - Cameron Diaz treks into the Andes mountains of Peru, where young shaman Puma Singona, of the Quechua tribe, is keeping his people's culture alive.
- 4REAL Pawnee - Casey Affleck visits the Pawnee Nation reservation in Oklahoma to meet Crystal Echo-Hawk and her Nvision crew who work with Native youth through hip hop & art.
- 4REAL Vancouver - Eva Mendes visits health advocate Liz Evans and the Portland Hotel Society in Vancouver's downtown eastside, a place rife with homelessness, addiction and mental illness.

== Awards and accolades ==
Season 1 producers, Sol Guy and Josh Thome, named Emerging Explorers by National Geographic as New Media Cultural Storytellers.

Season 1 producers, Sol Guy and Josh Thome received the 2009 Harmony Award.
