= Busytown Mysteries =

Canadian animated television series

- Also known as: Hurray for Huckle!
- Genre: Cartoon series Mystery
- Directed by: Ken Cunningham; Larry Jacobs
- Voices of: Jo Vannicola; Ellie Ellwand; Paul Wensley; Julie Lemieux; Richard Binsley; Catherine Disher; Kevin Dennis
- Theme music composer: Carl Lenox for Mountain Dog Music
- Opening theme: "You and Me, Solve a Mystery!"
- Ending theme: "You and Me, Solve a Mystery!" (instrumental)
- Countries of origin: Canada; Singapore (Season 2)
- Original language: English
- No. of seasons: 2
- No. of episodes: 52 (104 segments)

Production
- Executive producers: Michael Hirsh; Pamela Slavin; Toper Taylor
- Producers: Christine Davis; Genna Du Plessis; Audrey Velichka
- Editors: Camille Crawford; Michael Agostini
- Running time: 30 minutes
- Production companies: Cookie Jar Entertainment (Note: As Busytown Productions Inc. (Season 1) and Busytown II Productions Inc. (Season 2)); Peach Blossom Media (Season 2)

Original release
- Network: CBC Television (Kids' CBC)
- Release: September 22, 2007 – November 9, 2010

Related
- The Busy World of Richard Scarry

Busytown Mysteries, also known as Hurray for Huckle!, is a 2007 animated children's television series produced by Canadian studio Cookie Jar Entertainment, with Singapore studio Peach Blossom Media joining in production and animation for the second season. It aired in Canada as part of the Kids' CBC block and on the Tiny Pop channel in the United Kingdom. In the United States, the show was scheduled to debut on Qubo, but it aired as part of the Cookie Jar TV block on CBS instead, and then returned to the United States on Starz.

The first season was directed by Ken Cunningham and produced by Christine Davis. Animation for this season was produced by Helix Digital Inc. Post production was handled by Fearless Films and Supersonics Productions Inc. This season was the winner of the 2009 CFTPA award for best children's program, and nominated for the 2009 Pulcinella award for best preschool series at Italy's prestigious "Cartoons on the Bay".

The second season was directed by Larry Jacobs with post directing by Ken Cunningham and produced by Genna Du Plessis, and Audrey Velichka.

== Overview ==
The show takes place in Richard Scarry's Busytown and teaches the deductive reasoning through stories in which Huckle Cat (with his sister Sally Cat, and friend Lowly Worm) solve mysteries by examining evidence, with occasional help from friends such as Hilda Hippo, and twins Pig Will and Pig Won't. The mysteries are filed through insect reporter Gold Bug, who comes with a microphone and his own personal news van.

== Voice cast ==
- Jo Vannicola as Huckle Cat, Sally's older brother and the leader of his detective group. Huckle is the most mature, observative and intelligent of his group, though he isn't above childish behavior. He drives a red car with a picture of his face on the hood.
- Ellie Ellwand as Sally Cat, Huckle's younger sister. Sally is much more immature than her brother, but she is always on his side. She rides an orange scooter and wears a red helmet doing so.
- Paul Wensley as Lowly Worm, a friend of Huckle and Sally's. Lowly is easy going and has a bit of a joking spree, often disguising himself as a long and thin object. A running gag in the series is Lowly's penchant for sneezing when near something he's allergic to (often a flower). He drives a red car shaped like an apple.
- Julie Lemieux as Pig Will, Pig Won't's twin, and a friend of Huckle's. Pig Will is cheery and optimistic, and although he and his brother mean well, their penchant for ridiculous theories, focus on food, and constant arguments often serve as a common source of the group's annoyances. He and his twin share a truck with a cab shaped like a sausage. Pig Will is identified by his straight ears, green shirt, and higher-pitched voice.
  - Lemieux also voices Hilda Hippo, a friend of Huckle's. Hilda enjoys numerous activities most consider feminine, and is typically seen bonding the most with Sally. She has numerous activities and drives a pink and purple buggy.
- Richard Binsley as Pig Won't, Pig Will's twin, and a friend of Huckle's. Pig Won't is grumpy and pessimistic, and although he and his brother mean well, their penchant for ridiculous theories, focus on food, and constant arguments often serve as a common source of the group's annoyances. He and his twin share a truck with a cab shaped like a sausage. Pig Won't is identified by his bent ears, red shirt, and lower-pitched voice.
- Kevin Dennis as Goldbug, Busytown's main reporter. He is often around when there is a mystery around, but he also does reports on key events all over Busytown. He uses a large variety of small orange vehicles, namely a news van, helicopter, and occasionally a boat.
- TBA as Sergeant Murphy
- TBA as Mr. Grunkle
- TBA as Mr.Fixit
- TBA as Mayor Fox
- TBA as Mr. Frumble

== Episodes ==
Each of the following episodes consists of two segments.

=== Season 1 (2007) ===
No.	Title	Original release date
1	"The Big Apple Mystery / The Missing Pickle Car Mystery"	September 22, 2007
A giant wooden apple on the fruit store sign falls off and the gang investigates where it went. / Huckle Po is on the case when Mr. Frumble's newly painted Pickle Car goes missing.
2	"The Mystery Wheel / Busytown Blue-Bottoms"	September 29, 2007
Huckle, Lowly, and Sally discover a missing wheel by the road. / The Busytown citizens find blue paint on their clothes, so Huckle sets out to find the bench that needs a "wet paint" sign.
3	"The Mystery of the Lost Parrot / The Monster Mystery"	October 4, 2007
Huckle and Lowly try to reunite a lost parrot without an owner. / Sally is convinced there's a monster loose in Busytown.
4	"The Trouble with Bubbles / Little Orphan Egg"	November 7, 2007
Busytown cars start blowing bubbles after getting fuel. Huckle and the gang soon realize that bubble bath soap was accidentally pumped into the gas station tank. / Huckle, Lowly, and Sally discover an abandoned egg in the park, so they search for a nest with similar-looking eggs.
5	"The Lighthouse Ghost Mystery / Cornfield Confusion"	November 8, 2007
Huckle tries to prove there is no such thing as ghosts when Hilda Hippo thinks she sees one in the lighthouse. / A sign leading citizens to a corn stand suddenly swings upside down and points in the wrong direction.
6	"The Sticky Stuff Mystery / Up, Up and Away"	November 9, 2007
Busytown citizens get stuck in purple goo. / Pig Won't and a bunch of helium balloons disappear when the kids help decorate cars for Jack's big sale.
7	"Six Little Muffins / The Crashing Cans Mystery"	November 10, 2007
When Hilda invites the gang over for muffins they suddenly disappear leaving the gang to figure out why. / Huckle and the gang try to determine why someone is knocking over stacks of cans in Mr. Cat's shop.
8	"The Invisible Cake Snatcher / On the Move"	November 11, 2007
Huckle, Lowly, and Sally's science project vanishes from inside a locked room. / Huckle helps Sally track down her missing scooter.
9	"Litterbug Busters / There Might Be Giants"	November 12, 2007
Huckle hunts down a litterbug. / Pig Will and Pig Won't are convinced that giant robots are invading Busytown.
10	"Where's Junior? / The Secret Club Mystery"	November 13, 2007
When Junior Monkey goes missing, Huckle, the gang and her little sister try to solve the mystery. / The Pig Brothers refuse to let their friends join their secret club.
11	"The Playground Mystery / The Crazy Clock Mix-Up Mystery"	November 14, 2007
When the playground items go missing, the gang is convinced that it must be the work of the Playground Grabber. / While the gang is at Mr. Fix-It's shop to have his portable video game repaired, they are surprised when the clocks suddenly go crazy, causing confusion.
12	"The Cheese Car Chomp Mystery / Where's the Hero?"	November 15, 2007
Huckle and the gang investigate what took a bite of the Mouse family's cheese car. / Huckle and his friends search for the mysterious hero who rescued Granny Goat from the train tracks.
13	"The Mystery of the Unbreakable Bread / The Twisty Line Mystery"	November 16, 2007
Huckle, Lowly, and Sally are determined to figure out why every loaf of bread in Busytown is as hard as concrete. / The center line of the road becomes twisty, causing drivers to veer off the road.
14	"Chain of Mysteries / The Mystery of the Unfinished Painting"	November 17, 2007
When Huckle and the gang find that the teeter-totter and other objects are chained up, they try to get to the bottom of it. / Huckle and his friends find an unfinished portrait and set out to return it.
15	"The Pretty Park Mystery / The Missing Museum Statue Mystery"	November 19, 2007
Trimmed bushes that resemble Busytown residents mysteriously appear in the park. / Vincent Van Goat's statue made out of butter disappears from the Busytown Museum.
16	"The Vanishing Tiara Mystery / The Postage Stamp Mystery"	November 20, 2007
Huckle and the gang search for Belinda Bear's missing good luck tiara. / Huckle and his pals help Mr. Frumble find his prized butterfly stamp.
17	"The Bank Note Mystery / The Flying Saucer Mystery"	November 21, 2007
The Pig Brothers assume a bank note the gang found is from bank robbers. / Huckle and his friends notice that Goldbug, who reports on Huckle's mysteries, is absent while the kids try to solve the mystery of a flying saucer.
18	"The Mystery Present / The Smudged Letter Mystery"	November 22, 2007
Huckle, Lowly, Sally, and Hilda find a wrapped gift without a name tag. / The gang helps Postman Pig deliver a letter with a smudged address.
19	"The Falling Fruit Mystery / The Dragon Hunters"	November 23, 2007
Huckle and the gang investigate when a cherry tree in Patrick Pig's orchard mysteriously drops all its fruit. / The Pig Brothers think that a dragon is on the loose.
20	"The Disappearing Swimming Hole / The Forgotten Fire Hose Mystery"	November 24, 2007
When they find that the swimming hole is empty, the gang sets out to find out where the water went. / When the gang learns about a report of a giant snake at the park, they rush to the fire department, but the firefighters can't go anywhere until they retrieve their missing hose.
21	"The Disappearing Home Mystery / The Flipping, Flying, Slipping, Sliding Mystery"	November 25, 2007
Everything in the Raccoon family's house disappears. / Huckle and his pals try to figure out why metal objects are flying around Busytown.
22	"The Mystery of the Unpopular Pizzeria / The Silly Scarecrow Mystery"	November 27, 2007
The Busytown's popular pizzeria closes due to a sudden lack of business and the gang tries to figure out why. / Pig Will and Pig Won't are convinced that Farmer Pig's scarecrow is out to get them after finding straw on the bedroom floor.
23	"Huckle, Where's My Apple Car? / The Dirty Laundry Mystery"	November 28, 2007
Lowly joins Huckle and Sally in the orchard to pick apples for Granny Goat. / Huckle, Lowly, and Sally try to figure out what caused strange clothing stains.
24	"The Eight Shoes Mystery / The Something in the Woods Mystery"	November 29, 2007
Shoemaker Sam comes across a bag containing eight shoes to be repaired and a note to return them in time for an upcoming concert. / The gang hears strange noises when they go camping.
25	"The Borrowed Book Mystery / The Mystery of the Missing Mystery Books"	November 30, 2007
Sally needs to find a book at the library about trees for a book report, only to find the book overdue, and the gang tries to figure out who checked it out. / A shipment of Martha Mystery books goes missing and Huckle and the gang are set to find a box labeled "MM".
26	"The Mystery of the High Jumper / The Mystery of the Summer Snowman"	December 1, 2007
Someone who can jump higher than a house puts advertising stickers on everything, which doesn't please the Busytown pedestrians. / A snowman appears on a summer day. He doesn't melt, so Huckle and his friends try to find out why.

=== Season 2 (2009–2010) ===
No.	Title	Original release date
27	"The Mystery of the Mumbling Mummy / The False Alarm Mystery"	June 4, 2009
The gang investigates strange voices in the Busytown Museum, and Huckle wants to find out why a smoke alarm keeps going off but there is no fire.
28	"The Sandcastle Squasher / The Strange Ski Tracks Mystery"	July 4, 2009
The kids' sand castle gets washed overnight, and a set of ski tracks runs on either side of a tree.
29	"The Mislaid Sketchbook Mystery / The Hot and Cold Mystery"	August 4, 2009
The gang searches for real owner of a mysterious sketchbook, and a strange temperature has turned Busytown's summer into winter.
30	"The Missing Cookie Coupon Mystery / The Mystery of the Broken Boat"	September 4, 2009
The gang is determined break find out why coupons for free cookies fail to arrive in the mail, and Oliver's boat is mysteriously broken.
31	"The Disappearing Dolly Mystery / The Vanishing Vehicle Mystery"	October 4, 2009
Huckle and his pals help Baby Sadie find her lost doll, and the gang wants to find out why cars are missing from a parking space.
32	"Now You See It, Now You Don't / The Mystery of the Missing Pirate Gold"	April 13, 2009
Huckle, Lowly and Sally set out to rolling stones why their mini putt balls are disappearing, and the gold that Mr. Fixit found on the beach disappears.
33	"Mysterious Coloring T-Shirt / The Metal Finger Mystery"	April 14, 2009
The gang tries to find out why Sally's yellow T-shirt has mysteriously turned green, and the children discover pieces of a large metal hand.
34	"The Mystery of the Lost Camera / The Jellybean List Mystery"	April 15, 2009
Photographs on a lost camera help Huckle and his pals find the camera's rightful owner, and a written jellybean list made by Sally disappears.
35	"The Vanishing Hopscotch Mystery / The Hidden Treasure Mystery"	April 3, 2009
Sally and Hilda's hopscotch disappears, and Huckle and the gang search for Mr. Gronkle's priceless hidden treasure.
36	"The Busytown Lake Monster Mystery / The Bad Driver Mystery"	June 26, 2009
Lowly is convinced there is a monster loose in Busytown Lake; Huckle and his pals track down a bad driver.
37	"The Flattened Field Mystery / The Flying Potatoes Mystery"	July 7, 2009
A giant circle appears in the middle of a cornfield, and potatoes drop from the sky in Busytown.
38	"The Red Spot Painter Mystery / The Teeny Weeny Piano Mystery"	September 15, 2009
The gang sets out to find out who is painting red spots throughout Busytown, and Huckle, Sally and Lowly try to figure out who would own very a tiny piano.
39	"The Lost Key Mystery / The Door Knocker Mystery"	September 22, 2009
Huckle and his pals help Mayor Fox to find the missing key to Busytown, and the gang searches for the person who is knocking on doors.
40	"The Totally Fishy Mystery / The Radio Message Mystery"	October 13, 2009
Huckle and the gang are puzzled by a puddle full of goldfish, and Sgt. Murphy's radio receives a mysterious message.
41	"The Numbered Papers Mystery / The Sour Milk Mystery"	January 4, 2010
The gang finds numbered papers blowing around the park, the milk bought from the store of Grocer Cat is sour.
42	"The Delayed Delivery Mystery / The Busytown Fairies Mystery"	May 6, 2010
Huckle and the gang try to figure out why their pizza delivery is unusually late, and Hilda Hippo thinks that are real fairies in Busytown woods.
43	"The Mystery of the Lost Bag / The Flat Tire Mystery"	May 7, 2010
A lost bag has been discovered; Huckle, Lowly and Sally investigate why flat tires of Busytown has happened everywhere.
44	"Huckle Unlocks a Mystery / The Messy Car Mystery"	May 3, 2010
Sally, Huckle and Lowly look for the lock that fits the old key they've found, and Huckle and the gang are puzzled when they find chocolate stains on Lowly's apple car.
45	"The Achoo Mystery / The Missing Laundry Mystery"	May 4, 2010
Ginormous sneezes making from Hilda when she gets close to Sally; Lowly and Sally try to figure out why Ester's laundry keeps disappearing.
46	"The No News Today Mystery / The Big Tooth Mystery"	May 5, 2010
The children investigates why the newspaper does not show up at the houses; Huckle, Sally and Lowly find a huge tooth.
47	"The Big 10 Mystery / The Whistle Blower Mystery"	October 5, 2010
Huckle, Lowly and Sally investigate a metal piece that shows a big number 10, and Huckle and friends try to determine to search for the owner is causing a traffic jam.
48	"The Mystery Invitation / A Spoon Full of Mystery"	November 5, 2010
Mysterious party invitations meets sent out, and a large spoon is discovered.
49	"The Whoop Whoop Whoop Mystery / The Missing Mayor Mystery"	December 5, 2010
Strange incidents happens and Pig Will and Pig Won't think a hungry bat is on the loose, and Mayor Fox mysteriously disappears.
50	"The Apple Orchard Spaceman Mystery / The Pick and Run Mystery"	November 7, 2010
A spaceman suddenly appears in the Busytown apple orchard, and someone has taken all the red roses from Granny Goat's garden.
51	"The Sleeptown Mystery / The Mystery of the Switched Cars"	November 8, 2010
The citizens of Busytown fall asleep during the day, someone has switched Huckle's car.
52	"The Admiral Hornblast's Nameplate Mystery / The Secret Spy Ring Mystery"	November 9, 2010
A nameplate figure out to be put on the statue of Admiral Hornblast goes missing, and Pig Won't's helping spy ring disappears.

== Home releases ==
Between 2009-2010, NCircle Entertainment released several DVD releases of the series in the United States. The first two releases: "The Very Best Busytown Friends Ever!" and "Zooming Around Busytown" were released on February 10, 2009. The third: "The Best Outside Fun Ever!" was released on June 30, 2009. All three of these releases were released under the show's alternate title: Hurray for Huckle!. The last two releases: "A Pickle of a Pickle in Busytown", released on May 25, 2010, and "The Mysterious Mysteries Of Busytown", released on July 13, 2010, were released under the show's original title.

On July 27, 2010, Mill Creek Entertainment released a DVD called You and Me Solve a Mystery, a 3-disc set featuring the entire second season of the series on DVD, once again in the United States. Similar to other Cookie Jar releases from Mill Creek, the set also contains a bonus episode of The Busy World of Richard Scarry alongside four other Cookie Jar shows: Wimzie's House, A Miss Mallard Mystery, Nellie the Elephant and Simon in the Land of Chalk Drawings. The company also released the first disc as a standalone release on the same day, titled "The Biggest Mysteries Ever!", containing the same bonus episode of The Busy World of Richard Scarry.
