= Cookie Jar TV =

American children's programming block

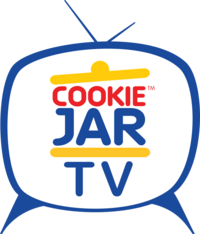
- Network: CBS
- Launched: September 16, 2006
- Closed: September 21, 2013
- Country of origin: United States
- Owner: DIC Entertainment (2006–08); Cookie Jar Entertainment (2008–12); DHX Media (2012–13)
- Formerly known as: KOL Secret Slumber Party (2006–07); KEWLopolis (2007–09)
- Format: Saturday morning children's programming block
- Running time: 3 hours
- Original language: English

Cookie Jar TV was an American children's programming block that aired on CBS, originally premiering on September 16, 2006, as the KOL Secret Slumber Party; the block was later rebranded as KEWLopolis (/ˈkuːlɔːpoʊlɪs/ KOO-law-poh-lis) on September 15, 2007, and then as Cookie Jar TV on September 19, 2009, running until September 21, 2013. It was originally programmed by DIC Entertainment, which over the course of the block's seven-year run, was acquired by Canada-based Cookie Jar Entertainment and subsequently by DHX Media (both of which thereby assumed responsibility for the lineup). Cookie Jar TV ended on September 21, 2013 and was replaced by a Litton Entertainment-produced block called the "CBS Dream Team" on September 28, 2013.

== History ==
=== KOL Secret Slumber Party ===
KOL Secret Slumber Party logo, used from 2006 to 2007.

On January 19, 2006, two months after Viacom and CBS Corporation finalized their separation into two commonly controlled companies (both owned by National Amusements), CBS announced that it would enter into a three-year programming partnership with DIC Entertainment to produce a new Saturday morning children's programming block including new and older series from its program library.

DIC originally announced that the block would be named CBS's Saturday Morning Secret Slumber Party; however, it was later renamed as the KOL Secret Slumber Party after DIC partnered with KOL, an AOL website aimed at children, to co-produce the block's programming. AOL managed the programming block's website and produced public service announcements which aired both on television and online. This association, along with the fact that some CBS stations chose to tape delay some of the programs to air on Sunday mornings, was what led to the block's renaming. Notably, despite AOL at the time being a sister company to Warner Bros., with whom CBS co-owned the then new CW Network, neither Secret Slumber Party nor Kids' WB advertised each other's programs and KOL Secret Slumber Party shows.

The KOL Secret Slumber Party premiered on September 16, 2006, replacing Nick Jr. on CBS. Its inaugural lineup included three first-run shows (Horseland, Cake, and Dance Revolution), one show that originally aired on the syndicated DIC Kids Network block (Trollz), and two shows from the 1990s (Madeline and Sabrina: The Animated Series). The block's de facto hosts (and in turn, from whom the Secret Slumber Party name was partly derived) were the Slumber Party Girls, an all-female teen pop group signed with Geffen Records (consisted of Cassie Scerbo, Mallory Low, Karla Deras, Lina Carattini, and Caroline Scott), who made appearances in break bumpers and interstitial segments during the block, and served as a house band on Dance Revolution.

=== KEWLopolis ===
KEWLopolis logo, used from 2007 to 2009.

In the summer of 2007, KOL withdrew its sponsorship from the network's Saturday morning block. CBS and DIC subsequently announced a new partnership with American Greetings to rebrand the block as KEWLopolis, debuting on September 15 of that year, which would be targeted at younger children and branded as a tie-in with the monthly teen magazine Kewl (which was established in part by DIC in May 2007; it is no longer in publication). All shows were retained from Secret Slumber Party except for Dance Revolution and Madeline. When the rebranded block began, a new series, American Greetings' Care Bears: Adventures in Care-a-lot joined the block along with another fellow DIC/American Greetings series Strawberry Shortcake, which also joined the lineup after having previously been aired in syndication. In November 2007, Sabrina: The Animated Series and Trollz were replaced with two new series, the DIC/American Greetings co-production Sushi Pack and DIC's DinoSquad.

=== Cookie Jar TV ===
On June 20, 2008, Canada-based production company Cookie Jar Group announced that it would acquire DIC Entertainment; the purchase was finalized one month later on July 23. On February 24, 2009, CBS renewed its time-lease agreement with Cookie Jar for three additional seasons, running through 2012.

Subsequently, on September 19, the block was rebranded again as Cookie Jar TV; all of the programs from KEWLopolis and KOL Secret Slumber Party were removed upon the block's relaunch. The new shows added to the block were Busytown Mysteries and Noonbory and the Super Seven. Sabrina: The Animated Series also returned to the lineup after leaving in 2007. The theme song for the block was composed by Ron Wasserman. On April 3, 2010, Doodlebops Rockin' Road Show was added, while Strawberry Shortcake returned to the block.

On September 18, 2010, Sabrina's Secret Life joined the block, replacing both Noonbory and the Super Seven and Strawberry Shortcake. On February 5, 2011, Trollz and Horseland returned to the block, replacing both Sabrina shows.

On September 17, 2011, Cookie Jar TV added The Doodlebops and PBS series Danger Rangers, replacing Doodlebops Rockin' Road Show and Trollz. On September 22, 2012, PBS series Liberty's Kids replaced Danger Rangers and Horseland. Following Cookie Jar Group's acquisition by DHX Media (now WildBrain) in October 2012, Cookie Jar TV brand remained in place for the block through the end of its run.

On July 24, 2013, CBS announced a programming agreement with Litton Entertainment (which recently programmed a Saturday morning block that is syndicated to ABC's owned-and-operated stations and affiliates for two years) to launch a new Saturday morning block featuring live-action reality-based series aimed at teenagers ages 13 to 18 years old. Cookie Jar TV ended its run after seven years on September 21, 2013, and was succeeded by the following week on September 28 by the Litton-produced CBS Dream Team.

== Programming ==
All of the programs aired within the block featured content compliant with educational programming requirements as mandated by the Federal Communications Commission via the Children's Television Act. Though the block was intended to air on Saturday mornings, like its predecessors, some CBS affiliates deferred certain programs aired within the block to Sunday mornings, or (in the case of affiliates in the Western United States) Saturday afternoons due to breaking news or severe weather coverage, or regional or select national sports broadcasts (especially in the case of college football and basketball tournaments) scheduled in earlier Saturday timeslots as makegoods to comply with the E/I regulations. Some stations also tape delayed the entire block in order to accommodate local weekend morning newscasts, the Saturday edition of The Early Show and later its successor CBS This Morning or other programs of local interest (such as real estate or lifestyle programs). It was the final children's block to be broadcast only in standard definition.

=== Former programming ===
==== KOL Secret Slumber Party ====
Title	Premiere date	End date	Source(s)
Madeline	September 16, 2006	September 8, 2007	
Sabrina: The Animated Series ‡	September 16, 2006	September 8, 2007	
Trollz ‡	September 16, 2006	September 8, 2007	
Horseland ‡	September 16, 2006	September 8, 2007	
Cake ‡	September 16, 2006	September 8, 2007	
Dance Revolution	September 16, 2006	September 8, 2007	

‡ - Program transitioned to KEWLopolis
† - Program transitioned to Cookie Jar TV

==== KEWLopolis ====
Title	Premiere date	End date	Source(s)
Care Bears: Adventures in Care-a-lot	September 15, 2007	September 12, 2009	
Strawberry Shortcake ‡	September 15, 2007	September 12, 2009	(Note: Originally planned to premiere on September 16, 2006.)
Cake †	September 15, 2007	September 12, 2009	
Horseland † ‡	September 15, 2007	September 12, 2009	
Sabrina: The Animated Series † ‡	September 15, 2007	October 27, 2007	
Trollz † ‡	September 15, 2007	October 27, 2007	
Sushi Pack	November 3, 2007	September 12, 2009	
DinoSquad	November 3, 2007	September 12, 2009	

† - Program transitioned from KOL Secret Slumber Party
‡ - Program transitioned to Cookie Jar TV

==== Cookie Jar TV ====
Title	Premiere date	End date	Source(s)
Busytown Mysteries	September 19, 2009	September 21, 2013	
Noonbory and the Super Seven	September 19, 2009	September 11, 2010	
Sabrina: The Animated Series †	September 19, 2009	January 29, 2011	
The Doodlebops Rockin' Road Show	April 3, 2010	September 10, 2011	
Strawberry Shortcake †	April 3, 2010	September 11, 2010	
Sabrina's Secret Life	September 18, 2010	January 29, 2011	(Note: Only the first 13 episodes were broadcast.)
Trollz †	February 5, 2011	September 10, 2011	
Horseland †	February 5, 2011	September 15, 2012	
The Doodlebops	September 17, 2011	September 21, 2013	
Danger Rangers	September 17, 2011	September 15, 2012	
Liberty's Kids	September 22, 2012	September 21, 2013	

† - Program transitioned from KOL Secret Slumber Party/KEWLopolis

=== Canceled programming ===
Title	Planned premiere date	Source(s)
Archie's Weird Mysteries	September 16, 2006	
Inspector Gadget's Field Trip	September 16, 2006	
Kooky Kitchen	September 16, 2006	
Littlest Pet Shop	September 16, 2006	
The Littles	September 16, 2006	
Sherlock Holmes in the 22nd Century	September 16, 2006	
Sonic Underground	September 16, 2006	
Where on Earth Is Carmen Sandiego?	September 16, 2006	

== See also ==
- Children's programming on CBS
- Cookie Jar Kids Network
- This is for Kids
