= Children's programming on CBS =

Historical summary of children's programs aired by CBS

CBS Eyemark

In regard to children's television programming, CBS has aired mostly animated series, such as the original versions of Scooby-Doo, Fat Albert and the Cosby Kids, Jim Henson's Muppet Babies, Garfield and Friends and the 1987 incarnation of Teenage Mutant Ninja Turtles. This article outlines the history of children's television programming on CBS including the various blocks and notable programs that have aired throughout the television network's history.

== History ==
=== Early years with Captain Kangaroo ===
From 1955 to 1984, live-action series Captain Kangaroo served as CBS' flagship children's program. For its first three months, the program aired only on weekday mornings; a Saturday morning edition was added in December 1955. During the 1964-65 season, the Saturday broadcast was temporarily replaced by Mr. Mayor, a children's program that served as a vehicle for Captain Kangaroo star Bob Keeshan; after returning in the fall of 1965, the Saturday edition of Captain Kangaroo was discontinued again in 1968, relegating it to weekdays only. Except for pre-emptions due to breaking news coverage, notably the network's three-day-long continuous coverage of the assassination of John F. Kennedy in 1963, and a few episodes that ran for 45 minutes, the program aired as an hour-long broadcast on weekday mornings until 1981. On September 9, 1968, the program began broadcasting in color.

Its audience of predominately children could never help the program compete in the ratings with entertainment/news shows such as NBC's Today, although Captain Kangaroo would become a three-time Emmy Award winner for "Outstanding Children's Entertainment Series" in 1979, 1983 and 1984. In the fall of 1981, as part of an expansion of the CBS Morning News, Captain Kangaroo was moved to the earlier time slot of 7:00 a.m. and reduced to half-hour – at which time, the program was retitled Wake Up with the Captain.

In the fall of 1982, Captain was relegated to a Saturday morning 7:00 a.m. (Eastern) time slot. The network offered a package of reruns to CBS-affiliated stations to air on Sunday mornings in place of the previous block of animated series reruns. Most CBS affiliates only cleared the Saturday morning broadcast of program afterward. Still a third of CBS' affiliated stations had stopped airing Captain Kangaroo entirely after 1982. The program was finally canceled altogether in late 1984, citing a lack of affiliate clearances. Alongside Captain Kangaroo, CBS aired various animated series aimed at children during the 1960s and 1970s, such as the original version of Scooby-Doo and Fat Albert and the Cosby Kids.

=== The In the News era (1971–1986) ===
From 1971 to 1986, CBS News produced a series of one-minute segments titled In the News, which aired between other Saturday morning programs. The "micro-series" (as it would be labelled today) had its genesis in a series of animated interstitials produced by CBS and Hanna-Barbera Productions called In the Know, featuring the title characters from Josie and the Pussycats narrating educational news segments tailored for children. This eventually evolved into a more live-action-oriented micro-series.

The network premiered its first in-house animated series since their original Terrytoons, CBS Storybreak, in 1985; originally hosted by Bob Keeshan, the half-hour series – which featured animated adaptations of popular children's books – was nominated for an Emmy Award for "Outstanding Animated Program" in 1986. Storybreak continued to air on the network in reruns until 1991, before returning in September 1993 with new hosted segments conducted by Malcolm-Jamal Warner.

=== 1986–1990 ===
One of the network's most popular children's programs around this time was Muppet Babies, an animated series which debuted in 1984 and ran for eight seasons. At the height of its popularity, CBS aired the program in two- or three-episode blocks. The program was briefly renamed Muppets, Babies and Monsters during the show's second season, with the second half-hour of the block filled by Little Muppet Monsters, a new series which featured live-action puppets and cartoons starring the adult Muppet characters. The program lasted three weeks before its cancellation (leaving 15 already produced episodes unaired), replaced by an additional half-hour of Muppet Babies. Pee-wee's Playhouse, which debuted in 1986, also became a major hit for the network's Saturday morning lineup; known for its bizarre humor, reruns of the series were abruptly dropped by CBS in 1991 – less than a year after the series ended its five-year run – following star Paul Reubens' arrest after allegedly exposing himself in a Sarasota, Florida adult movie theatre.

Another popular series was Garfield and Friends, based on the Garfield newspaper comics, which debuted on the network in 1988; the episodes featured a mix of longer-length animated segments and short segments known as "Quickies", featuring characters from the Garfield and U.S. Acres strips. Although the series had still been doing well in the ratings, Garfield and Friends ended in 1994 after seven seasons through a mutual agreement to cease production, after the show's production company nixed a proposal by CBS to reduce its production budget.

One series that never made it to the Saturday morning lineup was Garbage Pail Kids, a series based on the trading card series of the same name by Topps Company. CBS heavily promoted the series in the run-up to the 1987-88 season, having ordered an entire season of episodes; however it was abruptly pulled a few days before its premiere (replaced with a third half-hour of Muppet Babies), following protests from Action for Children's Television, the National Coalition on Television Violence and the Christian Leaders for Responsible Television due to claims that the series ridiculed the handicapped, glorified violence, and served mainly as a program-length commercial for the cards. Some advertisers (such as Nabisco, McDonald's and Crayola) also pulled out of sponsoring the program, either due to pressure from special interest groups, or because a preview tape of the show was not available in time for review. A few CBS stations (such as WIBW-TV in Topeka, Kansas; KOTV in Tulsa, Oklahoma and KREM-TV in Spokane, Washington) opted not to carry the program, notifying the network of their decision to pre-empt the program weeks in advance of the debut.

Another series which also never made it to the CBS Saturday morning lineup was The Noids, which was based on the Noid mascot featured in Domino's Pizza commercials and would have aired during the 1988-89 season. The show was scrapped for unknown reasons.

=== CBS Kid TV (1990–1993) ===
In 1990, the network began branding its Saturday morning block as CBS Kid TV, and incorporated additional programs over the next few years such as Teenage Mutant Ninja Turtles, Bill & Ted's Excellent Adventures, Back to the Future and Mother Goose and Grimm. CBS Kid TV's break bumpers featured the character Fido Dido.

=== CBS Saturday/CBS Toontastic TV/CBS Saturday Morning/CBS Kidz (1993–1997) ===
In September 1993, the block was rebranded as CBS Saturday. The block was later rebranded as CBS Toontastic TV in 1994, CBS Saturday Morning in 1995, and CBS Kidz in 1996. Additional live-action and animated programs that aired on the block around this time included Beakman's World, Beethoven, The Mask: Animated Series, The Twisted Tales of Felix the Cat, and Ace Ventura: Pet Detective.

During the early and mid-1990s, through a partnership between CBS and The Walt Disney Company, Walt Disney Television Animation provided much of CBS's animated programming (in addition, Disney partnered with CBS for some of its holiday specials such as Happy New Year, America and The All-American Thanksgiving Day Parade). The partnership led to, among other shows, several adaptations of recent Disney films (such as The Little Mermaid: The Series, Timon & Pumbaa and Aladdin: The Series) appearing on CBS's Saturday morning lineup.

==== Action Zone (1994–1997) ====
In an effort to compete with other action series at the time, Teenage Mutant Ninja Turtles was revamped into a more action-oriented series with less comedy, and along with new shows WildC.A.T.s and Skeleton Warriors was grouped into a new sub-block, "Action Zone", which premiered in September 1994. The sub-block featured a fly-through robotic style pre-opening that eventually segued into the show's opening title sequence. WildC.A.T.s. and Skeleton Warriors went off the air at the conclusion of the 1994-1995 season, at which time the sub-block was discontinued although Teenage Mutant Ninja Turtles individually retained the Action Zone brand and bumpers until that series ended its run on the network in 1997.

=== Think CBS Kids (1997–1998) ===
In 1997, taking advantage of the tightened Children's Television Act regulations mandated by the Federal Communications Commission that required broadcasters to carry three hours of educational programming each week, CBS launched an all-"educational/informational" Saturday morning lineup for the 1997-98 season, known as Think CBS Kids (which served as both the block's branding and tagline), replacing CBS Kidz.

The block consisted entirely of live-action series, marking the first time that CBS did not feature animated series within its children's program lineup. Programs included the youth-oriented game show Wheel 2000 (which aired simultaneously on the Game Show Network), a magazine series based on Sports Illustrated for Kids, a revival of the popular PBS television series The New Ghostwriter Mysteries, the long-running Beakman's World carried over from CBS Kidz, the second season of Fudge, and "Weird Al" Yankovic's first regular television series, The Weird Al Show. In the News was also briefly revived as part of the Think CBS Kids block, hosted by CBS Radio News Washington correspondent Dan Raviv (in place of original narrators Christopher Glenn and Gary Shepard).

At this time, CBS reduced its Saturday morning children's program lineup to three hours, with the launch of the two hour-long CBS News Saturday Morning (which eventually evolved into the Saturday edition of The Early Show). Since 1997, like other networks, the scheduling of CBS's children's programming has varied depending on the CBS station (for example, then-affiliate KTVT in Fort Worth, Texas—now owned-and-operated by CBS—aired the experimental Think CBS Kids block from 9:00 to 11:00 A.M. on Saturdays and 7:00 to 8:00 A.M. on Sundays from 1997 to 1998).

Think CBS Kids as a whole suffered from low ratings, resulting in the network canceling all of the shows after four months and even replacing Fudge immediately with reruns of CBS Storybreak for the remaining of the season.

=== CBS Kidshow (1998–2000) ===
CBS Kidshow logo

In 1998, CBS began contracting other companies to provide programming material for the network's Saturday morning schedule. The first of these blocks was the CBS Kidshow (using the tagline, "The CBS Kidshow: Get in the Act."), which debuted in October of that year and featured programming from the Canada-based animation studio Nelvana (such as Anatole, Mythic Warriors, Birdz, Rescue Heroes and Flying Rhino Junior High), replacing Think CBS Kids. In January 1999, Franklin and Rupert switched networks, with the former moving from the CBS lineup to Nickelodeon's preschool block Nick Jr., while the latter moved from Nick Jr. to CBS.

=== Nick Jr. on CBS/Nick on CBS (2000–2006) ===
Nickelodeon on CBS logo

Nick Jr. on CBS logo

After CBS's programming agreement with Nelvana ended in 2000, the network subsequently entered into a deal with Nickelodeon (which became a sister property to CBS, as a result of one-time CBS subsidiary-turned-media conglomerate Viacom's merger with the network) to air programming from the Nick Jr. block under the banner Nick Jr. on CBS. The block debuted on September 16, 2000, hosted by Face, the animated host/mascot originated on the flagship Nick Jr. block. The lineup was rebranded as simply Nick on CBS on September 14, 2002, as the block incorporated live-action and animated Nickelodeon series aimed at older children in addition to the Nick Jr. series. The older-skewing Nickelodeon series were removed from the block on September 11, 2004, refocusing the block back exclusively toward preschooler-oriented series; the block also began incorporating interstitial hosted segments featuring Piper O'Possum.

All of the programs that aired as part of the block met the FCC's educational programming requirements, despite some tenuousness to some of the claims of educational content in some programs. It was for this reason that the block did not add some of Nickelodeon's most popular programs (most notably SpongeBob SquarePants), even during the more open-formatted Nick on CBS era.

On December 31, 2005, Viacom was split into two separate companies, with CBS becoming part of the standalone company CBS Corporation, and Nickelodeon becoming part of a restructured Viacom. Nick Jr. on CBS/Nick on CBS ended on September 9, 2006.

=== KOL Secret Slumber Party/KEWLopolis/Cookie Jar TV (2006–2013) ===
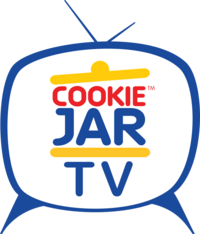
Cookie Jar TV logo

On January 19, 2006, less than a month after the Viacom-CBS split was finalized, CBS announced that it would enter into a three-year programming partnership with DIC Entertainment (which included the distribution of select tape delayed Formula One auto races) to produce a new children's program block featuring new and recent series from its program library.

After the announcement of the CBS/DIC partnership, the latter originally announced the block was to be branded the Secret Saturday Morning Slumber Party (or Saturday Morning Secret Slumber Party); the block was later renamed as the KOL Secret Slumber Party after DIC Entertainment, which produced all of the children's programming for the block, partnered with AOL to co-produce the block's first-run programs through its KOL subsidiary. AOL managed the programming block's website, and produced public service announcements which aired both on television and online. This alliance, along with the fact that some CBS stations chose to tape delay some of the programs to air on Sunday mornings, led to the block's name change.

The KOL Secret Slumber Party premiered on September 16, 2006, with three first-run programs (Cake, Dance Revolution, and Horseland) and three pre-2006 shows (Madeline, Trollz and Sabrina: The Animated Series) in the block's inaugural lineup. The block's female hosts (and in turn, from whom the Secret Slumber Party name was partly derived from) were the Slumber Party Girls, a teen pop group signed with Geffen Records (consisted of Cassie Scerbo, Mallory Low, Karla Deras, Carolina Carattini and Caroline Scott), who appeared during commercial break bumpers and interstitial segments seen before the start and the end segment of each program as well as serving as the musical performers for one of the series featured in the block, Dance Revolution.

In the summer of 2007, KOL withdrew its sponsorship from the network's Saturday morning block. CBS and DIC subsequently announced a new partnership with American Greetings Corporation to relaunch the block on September 21 of that year as KEWLopolis, which would be targeted at younger girls and serve as a tie-in with the monthly teen magazine KEWL (which was established in part by DiC in May 2007, and is no longer in publication). Complimenting CBS's 2007 lineup – which included KOL Secret Slumber Party holdovers Cake and Horseland – were newly added series Care Bears: Adventures in Care-a-lot, Strawberry Shortcake, DinoSquad and Sushi Pack. The block came under the purview of Cookie Jar Group, after DIC was acquired by the Canada-based company on July 23, 2008. On February 24, 2009, it was announced that CBS renewed its contract with Cookie Jar for three additional seasons, running through 2012.

On September 19, 2009, the block was rebranded again, this time to Cookie Jar TV. With the exception of Sabrina: The Animated Series, most of the programs recently featured on the predecessor KEWLopolis and KOL Secret Slumber Party were dropped upon the block's relaunch on September 19, 2009. The Cookie Jar TV brand remained in place for the block even after that company's acquisition by DHX Media (now WildBrain) in October 2012.

=== CBS Dream Team/CBS WKND (2013–present) ===
CBS WKND logo

On July 24, 2013, CBS announced that it had entered into a programming agreement with Litton Entertainment (which already programs a Saturday morning block syndicated to ABC owned-and-operated stations and affiliates and has subsequently begun producing a similarly formatted block for CBS' co-owned sister network The CW as of October 4, 2014) to launch a new Saturday morning block featuring live-action E/I lifestyle, wildlife and documentary programming aimed at teenagers between the ages of 13 and 18. The new Litton-produced block, the CBS Dream Team, debuted on September 28, 2013, marking the return to an exclusively live-action Saturday morning programming block to the network since the discontinuance of the experimental Think CBS Kids block in September 1998 (once again ending the entirety of conventional children's programming—animated or otherwise—airing on CBS). The block's lineup consisted mainly of newer series (including one scripted police procedural, The Inspectors, a format Litton has not used on programs airing on its other blocks), with the cooking series Recipe Rehab migrating to the Dream Team from the ABC-syndicated Litton's Weekend Adventure block.

On March 20, 2018, CBS and Litton announced that the block was renewed for five more seasons, through 2023.

On September 21, 2023, CBS announced that it would rebrand to CBS WKND starting October 7, 2023.

=== Potential future partnerships with Nickelodeon ===
Following the announcement of the second merger between CBS Corporation and Viacom, former CBS Corporation CEO Joseph Ianniello was receptive to the possibility of the return of Nickelodeon children's programming to CBS. However, Ianniello left CBS in 2020, and CBS has continued to carry the CBS WKND E/I programming block since the merger.

== Programming ==
=== List of notable children's programs broadcast by CBS ===
Note: Shows in bold are in-house productions from CBS, whose distribution rights are now held by CBS Media Ventures.

Title	Run
Ace Ventura: Pet Detective	1995–1997
The Adventures of Hyperman	1995–1996
**The Adventures of Raggedy Ann and Andy**	1988–1990; reran in August 1991 to replace Pee-Wee's Playhouse following a controversy
Aladdin	1994–1996
All Grown Up!	2004
All In	2013–2015; 2020–2022
The All-New Dennis the Menace	1993–1994
The All-New Popeye Hour	1978–1983
The Amazing Chan and the Chan Clan	1972
The Amazing Live Sea Monkeys	1992–1993
Anatole	1998–2000
The Archie Show	1968–1969
Archie's TV Funnies	1971–1973
Ark II	1976–1979
As Told by Ginger	2002
Back to the Future: The Animated Series	1991–1993
The Backyardigans	2004–2006
Bailey Kipper's P.O.V.	1996–1997
Beakman's World	1993–1998; originated in syndication in 1992, moved to CBS for its second season
Beethoven	1994–1995
The Berenstain Bears	1985–1987
Best Friends Furever	2019–2020
Bill & Ted's Excellent Adventures	1990–1991; moved to Fox Kids for its second season
Birdz	1998–1999
The Biskitts	1983–1984
BlackStar	1981–1984
Blaster's Universe	1999–2000
Blue's Clues	2000–2006
Bob the Builder	2001–2002
The Brothers García	2004
Bugs Bunny/Road Runner Hour	1968–1973; 1975–1978; 1978–1985
Busytown Mysteries	2009–2013
Cadillacs and Dinosaurs	1993–1994
Cake	2006–2009
**CBS Storybreak**	1985–1991, 1993–1995, 1996–1998
The California Raisins	1989–1990
Captain Midnight	1954–1956
Care Bears: Adventures in Care-a-lot	2007–2009
ChalkZone	2003–2004
The Charlie Brown and Snoopy Show	1983–1985
Chicken Soup for the Soul's Hidden Heroes	2015–2017
Clue Club	1976–1977
Conan and the Young Warriors	1994
Cyber COPS	1993
Dance Revolution	2006–2007
Danger Rangers	2011–2012
Dastardly and Muttley in Their Flying Machines	1969–1971
Dennis the Menace	1988; originally aired in syndication, moved to CBS for its second season
Dink, the Little Dinosaur	1989–1991
DinoSquad	2007–2009
The Doodlebops	2011–2013
Doodlebops Rockin' Road Show	2010–2011
Dora the Explorer	2000–2006
Dr. Chris: Pet Vet	2013–2019
Drak Pack	1980
The Dukes	1983
Dumb Bunnies	1998–1999
Dungeons & Dragons	1983–1985; rebroadcast on the same network in 1986 and again in 1987
Far Out Space Nuts	1975–1976
Fat Albert and the Cosby Kids	1972–1981, 1982-1984
Fievel's American Tails	1992–1993
Flip!	1988
Flying Rhino Junior High	1998–2000
Frankenstein Jr. and The Impossibles	1967–1968
Franklin	1998–1999, 2000–2002
Fudge	1997
Galaxy High	1986–1988
Game Changers	2013–2016
Garfield and Friends	1988–1995
The Get Along Gang	1984–1986
The Ghost Busters	1975–1976
Gilligan's Planet	1982–1983
Go, Diego, Go!	2005–2006
**Harlem Globetrotters**	1970–1971; co-produced by CBS and Hanna-Barbera
Hello Kitty's Furry Tale Theater	1987–1988
Help!... It's the Hair Bear Bunch!	1971–1974
The Henry Ford's Innovation Nation	2014–2024
The Herculoids	1967
Hey Arnold!	2002–2004
Hey Vern, It's Ernest!	1988–1989
Hope in the Wild	2018–2024
Horseland	2006–2009, 2011–2012
Hulk Hogan's Rock 'n' Wrestling	1985–1987
Inspector Gadget	1991–1992
The Inspectors	2015–2019
Jamie's 15-Minute Meals	2013–2014
Jason of Star Command	1978–1981
Jeannie	1973–1975
The Jetsons	1969–1971
Jim Henson's Muppet Babies and Monsters	1985
Josie and the Pussycats	1970–1971
Kangaroo	1984–1985
Kidd Video	1987
Kipper	2000–2001
Land of the Lost	1985, 1987; repeats of the NBC series from the 1970s
LazyTown	2004–2006
Liberty's Kids	2012–2013
Little Bear	2000–2001
Little Bill	2000–2006
Little Muppet Monsters	1985
The Little Mermaid	1992–1995
Lucky Dog	2013–2024
Madeline	2006–2007
Marsupilami	1993–1994
The Mask	1995–1997
Meatballs & Spaghetti	1982–1983
Mighty Mouse: The New Adventures	1987–1989
Miss Spider's Sunny Patch Friends	2004–2005
Mission Unstoppable	2019–2024
The Monkees	1969–1972; repeats of NBC series, with new songs
Mother Goose and Grimm	1991–1993
Muppet Babies	1984–1992
Mythic Warriors: Guardians of the Legend	1998–2000
The New Adventures of Batman	1977
The New Adventures of Superman	1966–1970
The New Ghostwriter Mysteries	1997–1998
The New Scooby-Doo Movies	1972–1973
New Tales from the Cryptkeeper	1999–2000
Noonbory and the Super Seven	2009–2010
Oswald	2001–2002
Pandamonium	1982–1983
Partridge Family 2200 A.D.	1974–1975
The Pebbles and Bamm-Bamm Show	1969–1972
Pee-wee's Playhouse	1986–1991
Pelswick	2002
The Perils of Penelope Pitstop	1969–1971
Pet Vet Dream Team	2018–2022
Pole Position	1984-1986
Popeye and Son	1987–1988
Project G.e.e.K.e.R.	1996-1997
Pryor's Place	1984–1985
The Puppy's Great Adventures	1986
Raw Toonage	1992–1993
Really Wild Animals	1995–1996
Recipe Rehab	2013–2015; 2023–2024
Riders in the Sky	1991–1992
Rescue Heroes	1999–2000
Richie Rich	1986
Rugrats	2003
Rupert	1999
Sabrina: The Animated Series	2006–2007, 2009–2011
Sabrina the Teenage Witch	1970–1974
Sabrina's Secret Life	2010–2011
Santo Bugito	1995–1996
Saturday Supercade	1983–1985
Scooby-Doo, Where Are You!	1969–1970, 1974–1976
Secrets of the Cryptkeeper's Haunted House	1996–1997
Shazam!	1974–1977
Shazam!/Isis Hour	1975–1977
The Skatebirds	1977–1978
Skeleton Warriors	1994–1995
Space Academy	1977–1979
Space Ghost and Dino Boy	1966–1968
Speed Buggy	1973–1975, 1978, 1982–1983
The Sports Illustrated for Kids Show	1997–1998
Strawberry Shortcake	2007–2009, 2010
Superman	1988–89
Sushi Pack	2007–2009
Sylvester & Tweety	1976–1977
Sylvester & Tweety, Daffy & Speedy	1982
Tails of Valor	2019; 2023–2024
Tarzan, Lord of the Jungle	1976–1982, 1984
Teenage Mutant Ninja Turtles	1990–1997; originated in syndication in 1987, moved to CBS in 1990 during its fourth season
Teen Wolf	1986–1989
Tennessee Tuxedo and His Tales	1963–1966
Timon & Pumbaa	1995–1997
Tom and Jerry	1965–1972
Trollz	2006–2007, 2011
The Twisted Tales of Felix the Cat	1995–1997
Underdog	1966–1968
The U.S. of Archie	1974–1976
Valley of the Dinosaurs	1974–1976
Wacky Races	1968–1970
The Weird Al Show	1997–1998
Wheel 2000	1997–1998
Where's Waldo?	1991–1992
Wild C.A.T.s	1994–1995
Wildfire	1986–1987
The Wild Thornberrys	2002–2004
The Wuzzles	1985–1986

==== Saturday morning preview specials ====
- 1969 – CBS Funtastic Preview (hosted by Family Affair stars Sebastian Cabot, Johnny Whitaker and Anissa Jones)
- 1974 – Socko Saturday (hosted by the cast of The Hudson Brothers)
- 1975 – Dyn-o-mite Saturday (hosted by Good Times stars BernNadette Stanis, Jimmie Walker and Ralph Carter)
- 1976 – Hey, Hey, Hey! It's the CBS Saturday Preview Special (hosted by Fat Albert and the Cosby Kids)
- 1977 – Wacko Saturday Preview (hosted by the cast of Wacko)
- 1983 – Preview Special (hosted by Scott Baio; featuring the Krofft Puppets, and Sorrell Booke and James Best, the latter two as their respective Dukes of Hazzard characters Boss Hogg and Sheriff Rosco P. Coltrane)
- 1984 – Saturday's The Place (hosted by Joyce DeWitt; featuring Howie Mandel and Ted Knight)
- 1985 – All-Star Saturday Spectacular (hosted by Roddy Piper)

=== Animated primetime holiday specials ===
CBS was the original broadcast network home of the animated primetime holiday specials based on the Peanuts comic strip, beginning with A Charlie Brown Christmas in 1965. Over 30 holiday Peanuts specials (each for a specific holiday such as Halloween) were broadcast on CBS from that time until 2000, when the broadcast rights were acquired by ABC. CBS also aired several prime time animated specials based on the works of Dr. Seuss, beginning with How the Grinch Stole Christmas in 1966, as well as several specials based on the Garfield comic strip during the 1980s (which led to Garfield getting his own Saturday morning cartoon on the network, Garfield and Friends, in 1988). Two animated specials by the Rankin/Bass studio, the stop motion classic Rudolph the Red-Nosed Reindeer, and the traditionally animated Frosty the Snowman have been annual holiday staples on CBS respectively since 1972 (Rudolph) (eight years after the special originally debuted on NBC) and 1969 (Frosty) (when it debuted on CBS). As of 2023, Rudolph and Frosty are the only two pre-1990 animated specials that continue to air on CBS on an annual basis (since 2019, they have also aired on Freeform); the broadcast rights to the Peanuts specials are now held by Apple TV+ while How The Grinch Stole Christmas is broadcast by NBC, its streaming sister Peacock and Warner Bros. Discovery outlets; the Garfield specials aren't currently shown. In the 21st century, Rudolph and Frosty have been joined by a series of newer specials that air on a semi-regular basis, including such entries as Frosty Returns, the Robbie the Reindeer shorts, The Flight Before Christmas and The Story of Santa Claus.

All of these animated specials, from 1973 to 1992, began with a fondly remembered seven-second animated opening sequence, in which the words "A CBS Special Presentation" were displayed in a colorful ITC Avant Garde typeface. The word "SPECIAL", in all caps and repeated multiple times in multiple colors, slowly zoomed out from the frame in a spinning counterclockwise motion against a black background, and rapidly zoomed back into frame as a single word, in white, at the end; the sequence was accompanied by a jazzy though majestic up-tempo fanfare with dramatic horns and percussion (believed to be edited incidental music from the CBS crime drama Hawaii Five-O, titled "Call to Danger" on the Capitol Records soundtrack LP). This opening sequence – presumably designed by, or under the supervision of, longtime CBS creative director Lou Dorfsman (who oversaw print and on-air graphics for CBS for nearly 30 years, replacing William Golden following his death in 1959) – also appeared immediately before other CBS specials of the period (such as the annual presentations of the Miss USA pageant and the Kennedy Center Honors).

== See also ==
- Lists of United States network television schedules – includes articles on Saturday morning children's programming schedules among the major networks
- Children's programming on the American Broadcasting Company
- Children's programming on NBC
- Children's programming on TBS/TNT
