= Nickelodeon on CBS =

American children's programming block (2000–2006)

Nick on CBS Nickelodeon on CBS
- Network: CBS
- Launched: September 16, 2000
- Closed: September 9, 2006
- Country of origin: United States
- Owner: Viacom
- Formerly known as: Nick Jr. on CBS (2000–02, 2004–06); Nick on CBS (2002–04)
- Format: Saturday morning children's program block
- Original language: English

Nick on CBS (also known as Nickelodeon on CBS) was an American Saturday-morning cartoon children's programming block featuring programming from Nick Jr. and Nickelodeon that ran on CBS from September 16, 2000 to September 9, 2006. It initially aired programming from the Nick Jr. block until September 7, 2002, when it began airing programming from Nickelodeon. On September 18, 2004, it returned to its previous format.

== History ==
On April 14, 2000, a few months after Viacom (in timeline, which CBS founded in 1952 as television syndication distributor CBS Television Film Sales, and later spun off in 1971) completed its $37 billion merger with CBS Corporation (the original Westinghouse Electric Corporation), CBS reached an agreement with new corporate relative Nickelodeon to air programming from its Nick Jr. programming block beginning that September.

Nick Jr. on CBS logo used when the programming block first launched

On September 16, 2000, the three-hour block, known as Nick Jr. on CBS, premiered, replacing CBS Kidshow, produced by Canada-based animation studio Nelvana, which ended its run the week prior on September 9. For the first two years of the Viacom agreement, the block exclusively aired preschool-oriented programming from Nick Jr.; the block launched without commercial advertising, only airing promos, interstitial segments, and PSAs. Viacom began selling advertising during the block in early 2001; as with Nickelodeon's Nick Jr. block at the time, it would be limited to four minutes per-hour.

On September 14, 2002, the block was rebranded as Nick on CBS, and its programming content expanded to animated Nickelodeon series aimed at children between the ages of 2 and 12, in addition to two returning Nick Jr. series Blue's Clues and Dora the Explorer. The rebranding also introduced a new logo with three circles with different colors (orange for Nick (due to its logo's trademark hue), green for the word "On", and blue for CBS) alongside bumpers and promos animated by the now-defunct, Georgia-based Primal Screen.

As with its predecessor Think CBS Kids and CBS Kidshow blocks, all of the programs within the block complied with educational programming (E/I) requirements defined by the Children's Television Act, although the educational content in some of the programs was tenuous in nature. It was partly for this reason why some of Nickelodeon's most popular programs (most notably SpongeBob SquarePants) were mainly not included as part of the CBS block due to offense, especially during the more open-formatted Nick on CBS era. However, Rugrats aired briefly in 2003, when it was added as a short-lived regular series within the block. On March 13, 2004, the block was rebranded, making additions such as live-action shows, such as The Brothers García.

The older-skewing Nickelodeon series were removed from the block and was reverted to Nick Jr. on CBS on September 18, 2004, refocusing the block exclusively towards preschool-oriented series. On September 17, 2005, the block added Go, Diego, Go! and began incorporating interstitial hosted segments featuring Piper O'Possum. On December 31, 2005, Viacom formally split under the shared control of National Amusements (owned by Sumner Redstone at the time), with CBS and all related broadcasting, television production and distribution properties as well as some non-production entities becoming part of the standalone company CBS Corporation, while Nickelodeon and its parent subsidiary MTV Networks (now Paramount Media Networks, a television division of Paramount Skydance) became part of a new company under the Viacom name.

Less than a month later on January 19, 2006, CBS announced that it would enter into a three-year programming partnership with DIC Entertainment (now WildBrain) to produce a new children's programming block for the three-hour Saturday morning timeslot featuring new and older series from its program library, to begin airing in Fall 2006. The block was replaced by DIC's block, initially branded as the KOL Secret Slumber Party (hosted by a short-lived teen-pop female quintet known as the Slumber Party Girls), on September 16, 2006. In October, Nickelodeon-owned, timeshared digital cable television network Noggin (currently rebranded as "Nick Jr.", but only 24/7) changed its weekend morning lineup to include more ongoing Nick Jr. series as a response to Nick Jr. on CBS's closure.

== Rumored return ==
Following the announcement of the second merger between CBS Corporation and Viacom, then CBS Corporation CEO Joseph Ianniello was receptive to the possibility of the return of Nickelodeon children's programming to CBS in the future. However, Ianniello left CBS in 2020, and CBS has continued to carry the CBS WKND E/I programming block since the merger, and there is currently no exact or estimated date for the return of Nickelodeon's children programming to CBS.

== Programming ==
All of the programs aired within the block featured content compliant with educational programming requirements as mandated by the Children's Television Act. Although the block was intended to air on Saturday mornings, some CBS affiliates deferred certain programs aired within the block to Sunday mornings, or (in the case of affiliates in the Western United States) Saturday afternoons due to breaking news or severe weather coverage, or regional or select national sports broadcasts (especially in the case of college football and basketball tournaments) scheduled in earlier Saturday timeslots as makegoods to comply with the E/I regulations. Some stations also tape delayed the entire block in order to accommodate local weekend morning newscasts, the Saturday edition of The Early Show, or other programs of local interest (such as real estate or lifestyle programs).

=== Former programming ===
==== Programming from Nickelodeon ====
Title	Premiere date	End date	Source(s)
Hey Arnold!	September 14, 2002	September 11, 2004	
The Wild Thornberrys	September 14, 2002	March 6, 2004	
As Told by Ginger	September 14, 2002	January 25, 2003	
Pelswick	September 14, 2002	November 23, 2002	
Rugrats	February 1, 2003	July 26, 2003	
ChalkZone	February 1, 2003	September 11, 2004	
All Grown Up!	March 13, 2004	September 11, 2004	
The Brothers García	March 13, 2004	September 11, 2004	

===== Preschool =====
Title	Premiere date	End date	Source(s)
Blue's Clues	September 16, 2000	September 9, 2006	
Dora the Explorer	September 16, 2000	September 9, 2006	
Little Bill	September 16, 2000	September 9, 2006	
Little Bear	September 16, 2000	September 15, 2001	
Oswald	September 22, 2001	September 7, 2002	
The Backyardigans	October 16, 2004	September 9, 2006	
Go, Diego, Go!	September 17, 2005	September 9, 2006	

==== Acquired programming ====
===== Preschool =====
Title	Premiere date	End date	Source(s)
Franklin	September 16, 2000	September 7, 2002	
Kipper	September 16, 2000	September 15, 2001	
Maggie and the Ferocious Beast	September 16, 2000 (select stations only)	September 15, 2001 (select stations only)	
Maisy	September 16, 2000 (select stations only)	September 15, 2001 (select stations only)	
Bob the Builder	September 22, 2001	September 7, 2002	
LazyTown	September 18, 2004	September 9, 2006	
Miss Spider's Sunny Patch Friends	September 18, 2004	September 10, 2005	

==== Cancelled/Scrapped Programming ====
Title	Planned Premiere Date
CatDog	September 14, 2002
Doug (TV series)	September 14, 2002
Rocket Power	September 14, 2002
Rocko's Modern Life	September 14, 2002
The Angry Beavers	September 14, 2002

== See also ==
- Children's Programming on CBS
