= CBS Kidshow =

American children's programming block

- Network: CBS
- Launched: October 3, 1998
- Closed: September 9, 2000
- Country of origin: United States
- Format: Saturday morning children's program block
- Running time: 3 hours
- Official website: cbs.nikolai.com

The CBS Kidshow was an American Saturday morning children's programming block that aired on CBS from October 3, 1998, to September 9, 2000. Canada-based Nelvana handled programming responsibilities.

== History ==
In January 1998, CBS entered into an agreement with the Canadian animation studio Nelvana to program and produce its Saturday-morning block, replacing the Think CBS Kids which aired that season. The CBS Kidshow was planned to relaunch on September 19 of that year, but CBS delayed the block's relaunch to October 3.

The new block featured several first-run series co-produced by Nelvana, CBS and Scottish Television; the first half of the block was targeted towards younger audiences with series such as Franklin, Anatole, and Dumb Bunnies, while the second half of Flying Rhino Junior High, Mythic Warriors, and Birdz targeted an older audience. Nelvana also oversaw the block's branding, which featured a stage show theme with children performing for an audience of kids and computer-animated aliens; CBS VP of children's programming Brian O'Neal stated that the branding was intended to be "quirky and weird", and "give kids a sense of ownership". The launch was also backed by promotional campaigns with Baskin-Robbins, the USPS, and retail chain Target.

The premiere of Mythic Warriors was further delayed due to its complicated animation techniques; reruns of Tales from the Cryptkeeper (with a revival airing a year later) aired in Mythic Warriors' timeslot until it premiered on November 7.

In June 2000, a few months after Viacom (which CBS founded in 1952 as television syndication distributor CBS Films, Inc., and later spun off in 1971 after the then-recently implemented Financial Interest and Syndication Rules barred networks from holding financial interest in syndicated programming content) completed its $37 billion merger with CBS Corporation (which was the original Westinghouse Electric Corporation that purchased CBS in 1995), CBS reached an agreement with new corporate cousin Nickelodeon to air programming from the cable channel's preschool-oriented block Nick Jr. beginning that September. Prior to the deal, former Nick Jr. series Rupert moved to the CBS Kidshow block in January 1999, as part of an agreement in which both it and another animated series, Franklin, swapped networks (with Franklin moving from CBS to the Nick Jr. block on Nickelodeon).

The CBS Kidshow block ended its run on September 9, 2000, and was replaced the following week on September 16 by Nick Jr. on CBS, which featured two Nelvana series - the aforementioned Franklin and Little Bear; several other Nelvana series from Nickelodeon and Nick Jr. continued to air on CBS until September 9, 2006, after which, the Nickelodeon block was replaced with KOL Secret Slumber Party as a result of Viacom and CBS demerging earlier that year.

== Programming ==
=== Scheduling variances and pre-emptions ===
Although the block was intended to air on Saturday mornings, some CBS affiliates deferred some programs over the course of the CBS Kidshow block's run to Sunday or early Saturday morning time slots or tape delayed the entire block in order to accommodate local weekend morning newscasts. Other stations pre-empted some programs outright for these same reasons, as well as due to professional and college sports broadcasts scheduled by CBS (especially in the case of college football and basketball tournaments) or its stations (primarily through sports syndication services), although most affiliates aired the block in its entirety.

=== Programming ===
Title	Premiere date	End date	Source(s)
Anatole	October 3, 1998	September 9, 2000	
Flying Rhino Junior High	October 3, 1998	September 9, 2000	
Tales from the Cryptkeeper	October 3, 1998	October 31, 1998	
Birdz	October 3, 1998	September 25, 1999	
Dumb Bunnies	October 3, 1998	September 25, 1999	
Franklin	October 3, 1998	January 2, 1999	
Mythic Warriors: Guardians of the Legend	November 7, 1998	September 9, 2000	
Rupert	January 9, 1999	September 25, 1999	
Rescue Heroes	October 2, 1999	September 9, 2000	
Blaster's Universe	October 2, 1999	September 9, 2000	

== See also ==
- Children's Programming on CBS
