= List of Go, Diego, Go! episodes =

Go, Diego, Go! is an American animated educational interactive children's television program that premiered on Nickelodeon on September 6, 2005, in the United States. Created and executive produced by Chris Gifford and Valerie Walsh Valdes, the series is a spin-off of Dora the Explorer and follows Dora's cousin Diego, an 8-year-old boy whose adventures frequently involve rescuing animals and protecting their environment.

== Series overview ==
Season	Episodes	Originally released	
Season	Episodes	First released	Last released
1	20	September 6, 2005	October 15, 2007
2	20	October 2, 2006	March 7, 2008
3	20	March 21, 2008	July 13, 2013
4	20	September 28, 2009	September 16, 2011

== Episodes ==
=== Season 1 (2005–07) ===
No. overall	No. in season	Title	Directed by	Written by	Storyboard by	Original release date	Prod. code
1	1	"Rescue of the Red-Eyed Tree Frogs"	George Chialtas, Sherie Pollack, and Henry Madden	Madellaine Paxson	Kuni Tomita (director); Carol Datuin, Jose Silverio, and Kuni Tomita	September 6, 2005	104
Diego and Baby Jaguar have to rescue two red-eyed tree frogs floating down the river.
2	2	"Diego Saves Mommy and Baby Sloth"	George Chialtas, Henry Madden, and Sherie Pollack	Nancy De Los Santos	Kuni Tomita (director); Carol Datuin, Jose Silverio, and Kuni Tomita	September 8, 2005 (Note: This episode first previewed on Noggin on August 22, 2005, and premiered as a sneak peek on September 7, 2005 as part of the Dora and Diego Power Hour.)	102
Diego and a sloth, Sammy, try to save a mother sloth and her baby before a mudslide hits their tree. On the way they face several challenges. They must row across a rocky lake, tiptoe past two harpy eagles, and find the right path to go down. They also have to find an animal that can help them climb a rocky mountain.
3	3	"Chinta the Baby Chinchilla"	George Chialtas, Henry Madden, and Sherie Pollack	Ligiah Villalobos	Kuni Tomita (director); Carol Datuin, Jose Silverio, and Kuni Tomita	September 8, 2005	101
When Diego learns of a little chinchilla who got lost from her family, he helps the chinchilla to find her way home to Chinchilla Mountain to be reunited with her family. Along their way, they face new challenges! Some of those include choosing the right path with the wrong path being filled with snakes and finding a way up Chinchilla Mountain to get the little chinchilla back with her family.
4	4	"Diego Saves Baby Humpback Whale"	George Chialtas, Henry Madden, Sherie Pollack, and Kuni Tomita	Valerie Walsh and Chris Gifford	Kuni Tomita (director); Carol Datuin, Jose Silverio, and Kuni Tomita	September 9, 2005	103
A baby humpback whale is in trouble, he is stuck on a rocky island in the ocean! Diego wants to reach the island to save the whale and bring him back to his mommy.
5	5	"Journey to Jaguar Mountain"	George Chialtas, Henry Madden, and Sherie Pollack	Chris Gifford	Kuni Tomita (director); Carol Datuin, Jose Silverio, and Kuni Tomita	September 12, 2005	110
Baby Jaguar wants to impress his mother by making it to the top of Jaguar Mountain all by himself. To do this, he must climb, reach and jump. Diego and Mama Jaguar follow Baby Jaguar as he climbs up Jaguar Mountain.
6	6	"Three Little Condors"	George Chialtas, Henry Madden, and Sherie Pollack	Chris Gifford	Kuni Tomita (director); Carol Datuin, Jose Silverio, and Kuni Tomita	September 13, 2005	106
Diego and Alicia have been nursing three little baby condors, but now it is time for them to get their own home! The condors are thrilled that they are being adopted, and they get a new mami and papi. But there is a problem, condors cannot fly at night. So the condors and Diego must hurry and get them home before nightfall.
7	7	"Pepito's Penguin School"	George Chialtas, Henry Madden, and Sherie Pollack	Valerie Walsh	Kuni Tomita (director); Carol Datuin, Jose Silverio, and Kuni Tomita	September 14, 2005	107
Diego and Alicia are far away from home for the first time ever! They are on a trip doing some research and animal help in Antarctica, and this trip proves to be a busy one! A little penguin named Pepito the Emperor Penguin and he is lost and cannot find his way to his new school. Diego must help him find where his new school is, and how to get there.
8	8	"Rainforest Race"	George Chialtas, Henry Madden, and Sherie Pollack	Rosemary Contreras	Kuni Tomita (director); Carol Datuin, Jose Silverio, and Kuni Tomita	September 15, 2005	109
An armadillo wants to compete in the big Rainforest Race, but sadly, she cannot find a team to join. Diego decides that he will join her team, and together they participate in the games.
9	9	"The Mommy Macaw"	George Chialtas, Henry Madden, and Sherie Pollack	Ligiah Villalobos	Kuni Tomita (director); Carol Datuin, Jose Silverio, and Kuni Tomita	September 16, 2005	105
A young Scarlet Macaw and his baby egg brother or sister have been found by Alicia. Their tucked safely into their nest, but their mommy is in big trouble! Diego goes on a search to find their mommy, then finds her stuck between two rocks and unable to get out on her own. After he rescues her, he has to find a way to treat her, so they can make their trip back to the nest and the baby macaw, so her little egg hatches.
10	10	"Linda the Llama Saves Carnival"	George Chialtas, Henry Madden, and Sherie Pollack	Ligiah Villalobos	Kuni Tomita (director); Carol Datuin, Jose Silverio, and Kuni Tomita	October 10, 2005	108
Diego rescues Linda the Llama who is stuck in a mud puddle and is delivering two baskets where one is filled with fruit and another basket is filled with musical instruments that she had to take to the parade up on top of the mountain.
11	11	"A Booboo on the Pygmy Marmoset"	Matt Engstrom, Allan Jacobsen, and Henry Madden	Ligiah Villalobos	Kuni Tomita (director); Anna Burns, Butch Datuin, Carol Datuin, Miyuki Hoshikawa, Kenji Ono, and Jose Silverio	January 26, 2006	118
Diego and Alicia must rescue a father and little pygmy marmoset from the prickly thorns. They need to cure the pygmy marmosets' booboos to make them feel better.
12	12	"A Blue Morpho Butterfly is Born!"	George Chialtas, Matt Engstrom, Allan Jacobsen, Henry Madden, and Sherie Pollack	Madellaine Paxson	Kuni Tomita (director); Carol Datuin, Miyuki Hoshikawa, and Jose Silverio	January 24, 2006	114
Baby Jaguar growls too loud and accidentally frightens a new full-grown blue morpho butterfly away. Diego sets out to rescue the butterfly in a cold cave and bring him back home safely.
13	13	"Cool Water for Ana the Anaconda"	George Chialtas, Henry Madden, and Sherie Pollack	Ligiah Villalobos	Kuni Tomita (director); Anna Burns and Norma Klinger	January 25, 2006	113
Diego rescues Ana the Anaconda who got separated from her friends when the river has been dried out. Diego needs to bring Ana the Anaconda to the water where all of her friends are.
14	14	"Linda the Librarian"	George Chialtas, Matt Engstrom, Allan Jacobsen, and Henry Madden	Rosemary Contreras	Kuni Tomita (director); Anna Burns, Butch Datuin, Carol Datuin, Enrique May, Kenji Ono, and Jose Silverio	January 23, 2006	117
Linda the Llama is delivering all of the library books to a new library on top of the mountain.
15	15	"Chito and Rita the Spectacled Bears"	Matt Engstrom, Henry Madden, and Allan Jacobsen	Ligiah Villalobos	Kuni Tomita (director); Carol Datuin, Jose Silverio, and Kuni Tomita	February 20, 2006	111
Diego and Dora team up to help a pair of Spectacled Bear cubs named Chito and Rita by making a new home in the tallest trees in the cloud forest.
16–17	16–17	"Diego's Great Dinosaur Rescue"	George Chialtas, Matt Engstrom, Allan Jacobsen, and Henry Madden	Valerie Walsh	Kuni Tomita (director); Anna Burns, Butch Datuin, Carol Datuin, Enrico Santana, Jose Silverio, Kuni Tomita, and Ysty Veluz	August 17, 2007 (Note: This episode was first released on The Great Dinosaur Rescue VHS/DVD on February 21, 2006.)	119–120 (Note: Also listed under the syndication number #999.)
In this special two-part episode, a Maiasaura named Maia (a duck-billed dinosaur) has lost her family in a big storm. It's up to Diego, Alicia, Dora, and Baby Jaguar to travel back in time to the time of dinosaurs to help Maia find her family.
18	18	"Diego's Wolf Pup Rescue"	George Chialtas	Valerie Walsh	Kuni Tomita (director); Butch Datuin, Miyuki Hoshikawa, and Enrique May	September 18, 2006	112
Diego and Dora team up as they rescue a maned wolf pup who got separated from his mommy and brothers and sisters.
19	19	"Baby Jaguar to the Rescue"	Matt Engstrom, Allan Jacobsen, and Henry Madden	Ligiah Villalobos	Kuni Tomita (director); Anna Burns, Miyuki Hoshikawa, and Norma Klinger	October 15, 2007	116
Baby Jaguar is going to be an official animal rescuer. But first, he needs to rescue three animals in trouble then he gets an official animal rescue patch.
20	20	"Diego Saves the Sea Turtles"	George Chialtas, Matt Engstrom, Allan Jacobsen, and Henry Madden	Chris Gifford	Kuni Tomita (director); The Answer Studio, Fumio Maezono, and Kuni Tomita	July 10, 2006	115
Tuga and the other leatherback sea turtles need to lay their eggs, but the beach is too dirty. So Diego, Alicia, and their parents clean up some garbage, then it's time for the turtles to lay their eggs.

=== Season 2 (2006–08) ===
No. overall	No. in season	Title	Directed by	Written by	Storyboard by	Original release date	Prod. code
21	1	"Little Kinkajou is in Beehive Trouble"	George Chialtas	Ligiah Villalobos	Carol Datuin, Enrico Santana, Jose Silverio, and Kuni Tomita	October 4, 2006	201
Little Kinkajou got his head stuck in a beehive. Papa Kinkajou joins Diego and Dora in a mission to rescue Little Kinkajou before the bees return.
22	2	"Diego Saves Baby River Dolphin"	Matt Engstrom	Jorge Aguirre	Enrico Santana, Kuni Tomita, and Ysty Veluz	October 2, 2006	206
Baby River Dolphin got stuck in a puddle after a rainstorm, but he must follow the rainbow to get back home because today is the day he'll turn pink, like a Big River Dolphin.
23	3	"Diego and Baby Humpback to the Rescue"	Matt Engstrom	Valerie Walsh	Anna Burns, Butch Datuin, Enrico Santana, and Jose Silverio	October 3, 2006	202
King Humpback Whale has his tail caught under a sunken ship. Diego and Baby Humpback set off on an ocean journey to rescue the King Humpback Whale.
24	4	"Macky the Macaroni Penguin"	George Chialtas	Ligiah Villalobos	Carol Datuin and Jose Silverio	October 5, 2006	207
Diego finds a lost newborn penguin and her name is Macky the Macaroni Penguin. Diego must take her back home to penguin island and meet Alicia there to see all the other baby penguins being born.
25	5	"The Iguana Sing Along"	Matt Engstrom	Rosemary Contreras	Enrico Santana and Ysty Veluz	October 17, 2007	215
The Iguana sing along is about to start, but one of the desert iguanas is missing. Diego races against the setting sun to get Iggy the Iguana back home in time for the sing along.
26	6	"Panchita the Prairie Dog Finds a New Prairie"	Matt Engstrom	Jorge Aguirre	Anna Burns and Butch Datuin	October 18, 2007	217
Diego and Alicia find Panchita, the Mexican prairie dog, who needs to find a nice prairie for her family. Later, Diego and Alicia head out with Panchita and her prairie dog family.
27	7	"Diego Saves Christmas!"	George Chialtas	Chris Gifford	Carol Datuin and Jose Silverio	December 8, 2006 (Note: This episode was first released on Diego Saves Christmas! VHS/DVD on October 24, 2006.)	204
Diego is determined to save Christmas. He has to find a strong animal to pull Santa's sleigh out of a snowdrift.
28	8	"The Great Jaguar Rescue!"	Allan Jacobsen	Chris Gifford	Enrico Santana and Ysty Veluz	January 15, 2007	209
The Bobos have taken Baby Jaguar's growl away and locked it in a magic bottle. We have to catch them and get his growl back before the big jaguar party.
29	9	"Diego the Hero"	George Chialtas	Valerie Walsh	Enrico Santana and Ysty Veluz	February 5, 2007	218
Alicia is taking some sick and hurt chinstrap penguins to the Penguin Rescue Center, when her boat gets stuck in the ice. Diego and Baby Jaguar set out to help Alicia rescue the penguins.
30	10	"Sammy's Valentine"	Allan Jacobsen	Rosemary Contreras	Enrico Santana, Kuni Tomita, and Ysty Veluz	February 14, 2007	203
It is Valentine's Day and all of the Rainforest animals are trading valentines, but poor Sammy the Sloth is so slow. Diego and Sammy have to save Valentine's Day for Lulu the Sloth before the sun goes down.
31	11	"The Great Roadrunner Race"	Allan Jacobsen	Leyani Diaz	Anna Burns and Butch Datuin	March 5, 2007	205
Diego is at the desert visiting his friend Roady Roadrunner, who is about to compete in The Great Roadrunner Race. Roady is nervous because he has not done this before.
32	12	"The Tapir's Trip Home"	Matt Engstrom	Rosemary Contreras	Anna Burns and Butch Datuin	March 6, 2007	208
Diego must find Tapir a new home - a home that has grass for her to eat, water to swim in, and clouds to keep her nice and cool.
33	13	"Jorge the Little Hawk Learns to Migrate"	George Chialtas	Ligiah Villalobos	Carol Datuin and Jose Silverio	March 7, 2007	210
Jorge the Hawk is ready to migrate. We helped Diego and Alicia build a bird-plane that has the same-colored wings, beak, and tail feathers as Jorge's so he can follow the plane home to the warm forest.
34	14	"Giant Octopus to the Rescue!"	George Chialtas	Ligiah Villalobos	Anna Burns and Butch Datuin	March 8, 2007	214
Giant Octopus must help Diego rescue some ocean animals who are trapped near the underwater volcanoes.
35	15	"An Underwater Mystery"	Matt Engstrom	Valerie Walsh	Carol Datuin and Jose Silverio	June 26, 2007 (Note: This episode was first released on Underwater Mystery DVD on March 20, 2007.)	213
Diego and Alicia must determine what kind of fish Lucy is so that they can return her to her home.
36–37	16–17	"Diego's Safari Rescue"	George Chialtas, Matt Engstrom, and Henry Lenardin-Madden	Ligiah Villalobos	Butch Datuin, Carol Datuin, Enrico Santana, Jose Silverio, Kuni Tomita, and Ysty Veluz	October 8, 2007	219–220 (Note: Also listed under the syndication number #998.)
Diego, Alicia and Baby Jaguar visit their friend Juma in East Africa; Juma tells a story about what happened to the African elephants. When a mean Magician, who used to be a mosquito, turned them into giant rocks, so Diego, Alicia, Juma and Baby Jaguar must find Erin the Elephant and a hidden magic drum that can break the Magician's spell and help all the animals in Africa.
38	18	"Diego and Alicia Save the Otters!"	Matt Engstrom	Rosemary Contreras	Anna Burns and Butch Datuin	October 16, 2007 (Note: This episode was first released in The Iguana Sing Along DVD on May 22, 2007.)	211
Diego and Alicia are playing hide-and-seek with Oscar and Ollie the otters, when the Bobo Brothers make a wave that pushes Ollie and Oscar down a river - in different directions.
39	19	"Alicia Saves the Crocodile"	George Chialtas and Allan Jacobsen	Chris Gifford	Enrico Santana and Ysty Veluz	February 1, 2008	219
Kyra the Crocodile is lost in a dirty city pond. Alicia sets out on her Rescue Racer to rescue Kyra and bring her back home to her river.
40	20	"Rhea is an Animal Rescuer"	George Chialtas	Luisa Dantas	Carol Datuin and Jose Silverio	March 7, 2008	216
Diego helps a Rhea - he can't fly, but that's okay because there's other things he can do - like running super fast. Diego invites him to be an animal rescuer!

=== Season 3 (2008–13) ===
Serena Kerrigan replaces Constanza Sperakis as the voice of Alicia.

No. overall	No. in season	Title	Directed by	Written by	Storyboard by	Original release date	Prod. code
41	1	"Kicho's Magic Flute"	George Chialtas	Chris Gifford	Butch Datuin and Ysty Veluz	March 2, 2009 (Note: This episode was first released on Diego's Magical Missions DVD on February 5, 2008.)	301
Diego is visiting Kicho, an indigenous boy from the Andes who is an expert in music and instruments. When Tranimal, a sneaky Magician, takes the magic flute, they and their friend, Falcon must get it back.
42	2	"Green Iguana Helps Abuelito Plant a New Strawberry Farm"	George Chialtas	Ligiah Villalobos	Carol Datuin and Curt Walstead	April 18, 2008	303
It's the growing season and it's time for Abuelito's Strawberry Festival, but when a strong Windy Wind blows all the strawberries away, Alicia must ask Diego and his friend, a Green iguana for help.
43	3	"Rainforest Rhapsody"	Henry Lenardin-Madden	Henry Lenardin-Madden	Miyuki Hoshikawa and Henry Lenardin-Madden	March 3, 2009	304
Diego and the pair of singing Red-Eyed Tree Frogs are practicing for the Rainforest Recital. Alicia is getting the other animals ready for the concert, but a puma scares them away.
44	4	"Gorilla Fun"	George Chialtas	Kuni Tomita and Kevin Hopps	Butch Datuin, Kuni Tomita, and Ysty Veluz	March 4, 2009	305
In Africa, Diego's friend Juma introduces him to a baby mountain gorilla. The baby gorilla can be the king at the gorilla king party for all of the mountain gorillas.
45–46	5–6	"Tuga Helps the Moon"	Allan Jacobsen	Rosemary Contreras	Butch Datuin, Carol Datuin, Enrico Santana, Jose Silverio, Kuni Tomita, Arthur Valencia, Ysty Veluz, and Curt Walstead	August 18, 2008 (Note: This episode was first released on Moonlight Rescue DVD on March 18, 2008.)	317-318 (Note: Also listed under the syndication number #997.)
Diego and Tuga help Luna put the pieces of the moon back together on her and help her get back into the night sky, so she can shine her light to lead the baby sea turtles to the ocean.
47	7	"Whistling Willie Finds a Friend"	George Chialtas	Valerie Walsh Valdes	Carol Datuin and Curt Walstead	March 21, 2008	311
When it's time for Willie, a Whistling duck to go home, Willie doesn't want to leave his friends, so Diego and Baby Jaguar take Willie home together.
48	8	"Super Flying Squirrel to the Rescue!"	George Chialtas	Jeff DeGrandis	Enrico Santana and Jose Silverio	June 27, 2008	306
Diego encounters a Flying Squirrel trying to save a little pygmy marmoset, but the marmoset is too heavy and Diego rescues the two by catching them both, then some baby birds in a nest fell in a river and it's up to Diego and Flying Squirrel to save them.
49	9	"Diego and Porcupine Save the Piñata!"	Henry Lenardin-Madden	Jorge Aguirre	Enrico Santana and Jose Silverio	May 30, 2008	302
Diego and Alicia are having a party for Porcupine's birthday, but the Bobos accidentally tie balloons on the pinata and send it floating in the air.
50	10	"It's a Bug's World!"	Allan Jacobsen	Ligiah Villalobos	Enrico Santana and Jose Silverio	May 12, 2008	310
Diego and Kicho use the magic flute to shrink themselves down to the size of an insect in order to see a whirligig beetle dance contest, but when Benito the Beetle's dance partner, Betty the Beetle gets lost, Diego must find her and get her back to the contest before it starts.
51	11	"Save the Giant Tortoises"	Allan Jacobsen	Valerie Walsh Valdes	Allan Jacobsen and Arthur Valencia	June 15, 2009	308
Dora, Diego, and Louie, a lonely giant tortoise travel to the Lost Island in the Galápagos Islands, in search of another giant tortoise.
52	12	"Alicia and Whitetail to the Rescue!"	Henry Lenardin-Madden	Rosemary Contreras	Butch Datuin, Kuni Tomita, and Ysty Veluz	June 6, 2008	309
Alicia and a white-tailed deer named Whitetail must save a baby deer that got stuck in a bush from an upcoming rock slide.
53	13	"Manatee's Mermaid Rescue!"	Allan Jacobsen	Rosemary Contreras	Carol Datuin and Curt Walstead	June 20, 2008	315
Diego reads with a manatee his favorite mermaid story, and together the pair go on a storybook adventure to rescue the Mermaids and their underwater city.
54	14	"Freddie the Fruit Bat Saves Halloween!"	Henry Lenardin-Madden	Rosemary Contreras	Allan Jacobsen, Kuni Tomita, and Ysty Veluz	October 27, 2008 (Note: This episode was first released on Diego's Halloween DVD on August 26, 2008.)	312
Diego, Alicia, and Freddie the Fruit Bat hear cries for help while they are setting up trick-or-treating booths for Halloween.
55	15	"Egyptian Camel Adventure"	George Chialtas	Ligiah Villalobos	Butch Datuin, Kuni Tomita, and Ysty Veluz	July 13, 2013 (Note: This episode was first released in Great Gorilla! DVD on June 3, 2008.)	313
Diego is visiting his new friend Medina in Egypt, but when the river dries out, they must find a way to fill it up for all the camels (and the other animals) to have enough water to drink.
56	16	"A New Flamingo Mami"	Allan Jacobsen	Ligiah Villalobos	Enrico Santana and Jose Silverio	March 5, 2009	314
Today is the day that all the flamingo eggs will hatch, but there's either one or two rescues needed before Diego gets to welcome the new baby flamingoes.
57	17	"The Bobo's Mother's Day!"	George Chialtas	Valerie Walsh Valdes	Butch Datuin, Enrico Santana, Jose Silverio, Kuni Tomita, Arthur Valencia, Ysty Veluz, and Curt Walstead	May 9, 2008	316
It's Mother's Day in the rainforest, and everyone is celebrating except for the Bobos Spider monkeys, who forgot! They and Diego lend a hand to make it the best Mother's Day ever.
58–59	18–19	"The Great Polar Bear Rescue"	Nancy Avery, George Chialtas, and Allan Jacobsen	Chris Gifford	Butch Datuin, Carol Datuin, Enrico Santana, Jose Silverio, Kuni Tomita, Arthur Valencia, Ysty Veluz, and Curt Walstead	September 18, 2009 (Note: This episode was first released on Diego's Arctic Rescue DVD on September 15, 2009.)	319-320 (Note: Also listed under the syndication number #996.)
Diego and Baby Jaguar are off to the Arctic to help a mother polar bear and find her babies. It's a big rescue, for sure, and even Alicia and Dora get involved.
60	20	"Diego and Dora Help Baby Monarch Get to the Festival"	Allan Jacobsen and Henry Lenardin-Madden	Luisa Dantas	Carol Datuin and Curt Walstead	November 25, 2009	307
Today is the day that all of the Monarch Butterflies are arrived to the warm forest at the Monarch Butterfly Festival so that everyone is ready for the festival to begin. But just then, Diego gets a called from his cousin Dora and telling him that a Baby Monarch won't come out of her chrysalis. Diego and Dora have to help Baby Monarch get to the festival so that all of the Monarch Butterflies can start the festival. NOTE: This is the final episode where Kathleen Herles provides the voice of Dora in this series, as with being her last time performing the character entirely.

=== Season 4 (2009–11) ===
Brandon Zambrano replaces Jake T. Austin as the voice of Diego and Gabriela Aisenberg replaces Serena Kerrigan as the voice of Alicia.

No. overall	No. in season	Title	Directed by	Written by	Storyboard by	Original release date	Prod. code
61	1	"Diego Reunites Hippo & Oxpecker"	George Chialtas and Allan Jacobsen	Brian Bromberg	George Chialtas, Bismarck "Butch" Datuin, Allan Jacobsen, and Ysty Veluz	September 28, 2009	406
In the grasslands of Africa, Diego was helping a hippopotamus relocate to Hippo Lake, after his old river habitat was being drained by a new neighboring town. Oxpecker, a friend of the Hippopotamus due to their symbiotic relationship (oxpeckers eat bugs off other animals' back to clean them), went to get some water plants from the old river to feed Hippopotamus, but fell in and was being sucked into the drainage pipe. After hearing the Oxpecker's call for help, and locating him via Click, Diego and Hippopotamus make their return journey back, through a field of tall grass (obscuring large rock obstacles, when they have to avoid with the assistance of a giraffe giving directions) and across hot terrain (assisted by some elephants, who use water from their trunks to cool the overheating Hippopotamus). When they reach the old river, Hippopotamus scares away some Nile crocodiles and rescues Oxpecker from the lake by blocking the drainage pipe with his body.
62	2	"Diego's Orangutan Rescue"	Henry Lenardin-Madden	Juan Carlos Perez	Bismarck "Butch" Datuin and Allan Jacobsen	September 29, 2009	403
In the rainforests of Borneo (Indonesia), Diego united a baby orangutan, who he found while canoeing along the river, with Baby Orangutan's Mommy and sister in a fruit tree forest that his friend Burgin, a fellow animal rescuer, had been planting. When Baby Orangutan goes into the canoe and loses the oar, he floats out-of-control along with the river current. Diego uses Click to locate Baby Orangutan and work out where the river current is taking him. Diego and Big Sister Orangutan swing from branch-to-branch along the river, and even through a swinging bamboo obstacle, to follow the canoe. During their travels, Diego has to rescue both Baby Orangutan (using a version of the "follow the leader" game, that Diego taught Baby Orangutan back at the fruit tree forest, to show Baby Orangutan how to duck under three naturally occurring river cave overpasses) and then Big Sister Orangutan (pulling her out of the river and then to shore, with a "zip cord" from Rescue Pack and then the assistance of an Asian elephant). Finally, both Diego and Big Sister Orangutan swing over the river and pull Baby Orangutan out of the canoe, just before the canoe crashes on some giant rocks. Once again using the "follow the leader" game to get Baby Orangutan to raise his arms, thereby assisting in his own rescue. They all use the forest's vines to swing back to the fruit tree forest, where Baby Orangutan is united with his family and his favorite fruit.
63	3	"Where is Okapi's Brother?"	George Chialtas and Allan Jacobsen	Jorge Aguirre	Enrico Vilbar Santana and Jose Silverio	September 30, 2009	402
In the rainforests of Central Africa, Diego and Alicia were playing "hide-and-seek" with the okapis amongst the trees. However, the lack of hiding spaces, due to logging, causes Okapi and his brother stray too far. Diego takes his Mobile Rescue Unit and follows the lost okapis' fresh footprints (sorting these out from other animals' footprints with his Field Journal) and tries to spot the okapis with his Spotting Scope (looking out for their stripes and long purple tongues). Diego initially finds Okapi hiding behind a rock, in part of the logged forest, but not his Brother. During the search for Okapi's brother, they rescue some animals, a zebra (who is sinking into wet sand, using the Mobile Rescue Unit's crane) and a baby giraffe (whose head is stuck in a tree, using the Mobile Rescue Unit's pedal operated lift and Okapi's long purple tongue to pull away the branches), and follow the rumors from these rescued animals about Okapi's brother's location. Diego finds Okapi's brother behind a rock on a mountain (who they rescue from leopards, avoiding them using Okapi's acute hearing as a guide) and return both of them to their African rainforest home.
64	4	"Puffin Fish Adventure"	George Chialtas and Allan Jacobsen	Rosemary Contreras	Carol Delmindo Datuin and Ysty Veluz	October 1, 2009	401
In Greenland, Diego was assisting a puffin (Puffy) babysit ten baby puffins. All of the baby puffins could neither fly, nor swim (due to having no swimming feathers yet), with Diego even having to teach the littlest one how to waddle. After using Click to find out where there were fish for the Baby Puffins to eat, i.e. Fish Canyon (where the parent puffins were hunting), and how to get there, they all set off there in Rescue Boat. While going past some giant waves, two of the puffin babies are almost eaten by an Arctic tern. when they fall into the water, but Diego frightens the seagull off by making an "Ar, ar!" puffin call and fishes them out of the water using Rescue Boat's life preserve. Upon hitting some impenetrable ice, they continue by foot over the ice, towards where the whales (which also eat fish) are conjugating (following Diego's Papi's advice by sending the biggest puffin, Puffy, to fly ahead to give directions). They get a lift the rest of the way to Fishy Canyon on a whale's back. When Puffy is attacked by an orca while diving for fish, Diego uses the clapping sound made by the thrashing of his whale ride's tail to scare the orca away. After Diego calls all the puffin parents together to their babies (again using the puffin call), the Puffin parents decide that Fishy Canyon will be their new home.
65	5	"Diego's Ringed Seal Rescue"	George Chialtas, Allan Jacobsen, and Henry Lenardin-Madden	Rosemary Contreras	Enrico Vilbar Santana and Jose Silverio	February 19, 2010 (Note: This episode was first released on Lion Cub Rescue DVD on January 26, 2010.)	405
In the Arctic, using their snowmobiles, Diego, Alicia, and Baby Jaguar visit a Rescue Center for ringed seals, needed for when the melting of the baby seals' snow caves leave them unprotected from the elements and polar bears. Upon hearing the distress calls of a baby ringed seal (Susie), and seeing (via Click) that this animal is being menaced by a polar bear as her snow cave melts, Diego transforms his convertible snow mobile into a jet ski to travel there. Upon arrival, Susie wiggles over some intervening sheet thin ice to Diego, a move preventing the polar bear from following. On their journey back, Diego looks after the baby seal, as they navigate on paths through the floating ice (especially when they have to avoid the polar bear again), as Susie searches for food and when they both travel through a snowstorm. Diego even teaches Susie basic seal movements, such as launching itself onto the ice from the water and even wiggling its nose. Close to the Rescue Center, Susie must again avoid the polar bear, the third time, this time by diving in and out of some holes in the ice made by some of the other Rescue Center ringed seal inhabitants. When the bear gets stuck in one of those holes, Diego suddenly rescues the polar bear as well with the use of a shovel to dig the animal out, warning the bear not to return due to the abundance of those holes in that area. Susie joins the safety of the Rescue Center and the other ringed seal inhabitants, thus completing Diego's mission.
66	6	"All Aboard the Giant Panda Express!"	George Chialtas and Allan Jacobsen	Jorge Aguirre	Carol Delmindo Datuin and Ysty Veluz	March 15, 2010	407
In the mountains of China, Diego and Baby Jaguar were looking for Giant Pandas, when they heard a distress growling call coming from a hungry panda (Pan Pan), who was slipping off a precious in his attempts to reach the last piece of bamboo on the mountain. Diego rescues Pan Pan and resolved take him to Bamboo Mountain, where such food is plentiful. Via Diego's video watch, Yang, a fellow animal rescuer at Bamboo Mountain, informs Diego that some pandas, that went looking for bamboo, are also missing, including Pan Pan's grandfather (Grandpa Panda), Pan Pan's mother (Mommy Panda), Pan Pan's baby sister (Baby Panda), and the Panda Cub Twins. Diego and Pan Pan take a train (The Giant Panda Express) and retrieve them, locating them all with Diego's Panda Tracker and then his Spotting Scope (by looking for black and white fur). In the snow fields (first stop), they rescue Grandpa Panda (by waking him up just before a wind created rolling snow ball was going to hit him). In the tall trees (second stop), they meet Mommy Panda and rescue Baby Panda (caught up a tree that she was using as a vantage point to find bamboo, a tree too thin for the mother to climb, but which Diego can climb using his Sharp Panda Gloves). In the rock caves (third stop), they rescue the Panda Twins (from some clouded leopards, which Grandpa Panda scares away with his growls). Diego brings all these hungry Pandas, via the train, to their new home on Bamboo Mountain, thus completing his mission.
67	7	"Bengal Tiger Makes a Wish"	George Chialtas	Juan Carlos Perez	Jose Silverio, Kuni Tomita, and Ysty Veluz	March 16, 2010	410
In the forests of India, after a big rainstorm, Diego responds to the distress calls of a tiger, a Bengal tiger (Benji), who was caught in a wire, and rescues it. Diego pledges to help this lost tiger achieve his wish to get back to his mother at the magical Wishing Tree. Following Click's directions, they journey to the Wishing Tree, helping several animals along the way. Diego and Benji help some baby parrots, after Benji climbs their tree and removes some branches that have fallen over the baby parrots' nest (the rescued birds subsequently wish that the sun would shine, so that the flowers would open). After swimming across the wild and wavy river, Diego and Benji help a mother duck by scaring away two mugger crocodiles menacing her riverside nest with hatching duckling eggs (the mother duck subsequently wishes the river would calm down, so her babies could go swimming). At the Tiger Temple, they meet Shanti, a fellow animal rescuer, who has always had a wish to open a tiger reserve. They also assist a little tiger to find its way out of the temple, who wishes that there were more tigers to play with. Diego and Benji get to the Wishing Tree, where Benji's mother's wish to see Benji again is granted. Benji (whose original wish was the same as his mother's wish) is allowed to make an additional wish, and he wishes that the wishes made by all of their new friends that they made along their journey were granted. All the animals wishes start be realized, concluding with Shanti and Diego pledging, and then building, a tiger reserved at the Wishing Tree, to provide a safe place for all of the tigers to live.
68	8	"Leaping Lemurs"	George Chialtas	Jorge Aguirre	Bismarck "Butch" Datuin, Enrico Vilbar Santana, and Jose Silverio	March 17, 2010	409
On the island of Madagascar, Diego and Baby Jaguar are returning some native animals (using the Rescue Boat), that had been inappropriately taken away to be used as pets, when they notice that an unhappy sifaka lemur (Sara) cannot find her way back to her family, due to being away too long. Using Click to locate and give directions in order to get to the other sifaka lemurs. Diego and Baby Jaguar endeavor to reunite Sara with her family. They go past the Spiky Trees, where Sara (using her tough hands) and Diego (using his tough Lemur Gloves) climb a spiky tree to rescue a brown lemur whose tail is stuck on a breaking branches spiky thorns, thus allowing the brown lemur to return to his family. After helping Sara defend herself from a fossa (by hoping around it to make it too dizzy to attack), then they go past the Rocky Caves, where Diego helps a mouse lemur find his family within those dark caves (using his flash light to locate the lemur's mother by her shining yellow eyes). As they reunite each different species of lemur with their families, they gradually cheer Sara up. Finally, following directions from a group of ring-tailed lemurs, they go to the rainforest and deliver Sara back to her sifaka lemur family, catching up to them by bouncing from tree-to-tree (with Diego using a special bouncing boot feature on his boots to accompany Sara), making Sara super happy and completing Diego's mission.
69	9	"Diego Saves the Beavers"	Allan Jacobsen	Rosemary Contreras	Carol Delmindo Datuin and Enrico Vilbar Santana	March 18, 2010	411
In the mountains of Canada, Diego and his friend, Billy the Beaver are building a dam to save a chipmunks' home from an overflow due to some recent flood water (caused by the rapid melting of mountain snow). Alicia informs Diego (via his video watch) that Billy's family, who hadn't finished building their dam, were in the path of a oncoming giant river flood wave. Following Click's directions and using a Kayak, created by converting Diego's Rescue Pack, Diego accompanies Billy downstream, and ahead of the oncoming flood wave, avoiding obstacles such as rocks, floating logs, even the Bobo Brothers who were mischievously creating whirlpools. At the Water Slide section, Billy saves some frogs by rolling a log to block the approaching water from entering their pond inlet, and at the prickly branches section, Billy rescues a baby deer by chomping some of the branches entangling her. The mission is completed when Diego and Billy reach the dam of Billy's family and build it up sufficiently to survive the oncoming wave. Alicia arrives with other animals she has saved, who decide to permanently shelter at this dam where it is safe.
70	10	"Ocean Animal Rescuer"	Allan Jacobsen	Jorge Aguirre	Bismarck "Butch" Datuin, Jose Silverio, and Ysty Veluz	April 22, 2010	412
Off the coast of Mexico, Bottlenose (a Bottlenose Dolphin) tells Diego (in his Rescue Dinghy) of his dream to be an Animal Rescuer, like Diego and Baby Humpback (the humpback whale), ever since Diego and Baby Humpback both rescued Bottlenose (sinking when stuck in a net, but brought to the surface by Diego and Baby Humpback and then torn free). They remember back to the previous times that both Baby Humpback and Bottlenose used their fast swimming speed to save some baby sea turtles (when Bottlenose and Baby Humpback scared away some menacing sharks) and even Diego himself (when Bottlenose guided Diego and his Rescue Speedboat through the fog and between rocks to get back to his Papi, who had called Diego back home for dinner on his Video Watch). Alerted to an oil spill by Alicia, Diego and Bottlenose spot Baby Humpback (using Diego's Spotting Scope to locate the whale's blowhole spray) trying to warn the coastal animals about the approaching oil all by himself. Bottlenose and Diego (riding on his back) jump three intervening coral reefs to join Baby Humpback, where they combine their effort to splash their tails to ward of the oil, which has now encompassed them all, until Alicia arrives to suck the oil up with an her Oil Vacuum. Upon completing their mission to save Baby Humpback and clean up the oil, they recognize Bottlenose's skills as an Ocean Animal Rescuer.
71	11	"Welcome Home, Lion Cub"	George Chialtas, Allan Jacobsen, and Henry Lenardin-Madden	Jorge Aguirre	George Chialtas, Carol Delmindo Datuin, Pete Mekis, Edemer Santos, and Ysty Veluz	June 18, 2010	404
In the grasslands of Tanzania (in East Africa), at an Africa Animal Rescue Center, Diego and Baby Jaguar help a Lion (Daddy Lion) escort his son (Lion Cub) back to their pride, where his mother, brother, sisters, and all his cousins, have organized a welcome back party. While Click is showing them the quickest way to get to the party, they discover that some of Lion Cub's family are in various forms of trouble along that route. At the river, Daddy Lion catches Baby Lion out of the river just before Baby Lion goes over a waterfall, when the tree branch the animal was hanging off breaks. Further on, Daddy Lion cuts Cousin Lion out of a net, that Diego has released from a tree, and then another net when Lion Cub gets caught in a similar net trap himself. The Lion Cub, after being realized, in turn cuts down a number of other unsprung net traps. Along the way the Lion Cub is mentored in various skills such as recognizing Lion tracks, creeping and crawling passed sleeping elephants, spotting Lions hiding in the grass (when they meet up with Sister Lion), and roaring loud (to divert a stampede of buffaloes). Upon completing the mission of safely escorting Lion Cub to his party, they realize that Lion Cub has become a lot like his father.
72–73	12–13	"Diego's International Rescue League"	George Chialtas and Allan Jacobsen	Rosemary Contreras	Bismarck "Butch" Datuin, Carol Delmindo Datuin, Gary Hartle, Pete Mekis, Enrico Vilbar Santana, Edemer Santos, Jose Silverio, and Ysty Veluz	September 24, 2010 (Note: This episode was released on Diego's Ultimate Rescue League DVD on August 31, 2010.)	419-420 (Note: Also listed under the syndication number #995.)
Diego and his father (World Animal Rescuer) travel by helicopter to Rescue Island (a special island with different animal habitats from around the world) where Diego and his team (each experienced in different rescue environments: Juma - deserts and grasslands of Africa, Shanti - forests of India, Burgin - ocean waters around the world and rainforests of Borneo (Indonesia), and Yang - mountains of China) are to be tested in order to obtain their World Rescue Badges, thus each officially becoming World Animal Rescuers. The test involves rescuing five different mystery animals eggs, stored in special heated cases, which are hidden around Rescue Island. To start the race Diego's team works in relay to complete an initial traditional obstacle course (tire run - Juma, cargo net crawl - Burgin, balance beam - Yang, zip line - Shanti, and climbing wall - Diego), collecting the first egg upon completion, from which hatches a sulcata tortoise.: First Egg - Travelling by Rescue Flyer to the Rescue Island's desert environment, they return the baby sulcata tortoise to her friends. They experience a sand storm (surviving by taking cover like the tortoise and her friends), which necessitates them digging out of the sand the case with the second mystery egg, from which hatches out a platypus.; Second Egg - Diego's team all fly to Rescue Island's forest river, where, after Shanti and Diego descend to the river using the Rescue Flyer's rope ladder, they follow the river paths (guided by the platypuses' sensing of the other platypuses' vibrations) to return the platypus to his family and recover the third mystery egg from the river (prevented from submerging by Diego and Shanti splashing the river to give it buoyancy), from which hatches a sea krait (a type of sea snake).; Third Egg - After Diego's team land on the ocean with the Rescue Flyer (transforming into a Rescue Boat), Burgin and Diego have to avoid losing the sea krait in the big waves (by surfing the waves) and dive to the bottom of the ocean (using Rescue Pack transformed into diving suits) to return the sea krait to her family and locate the fourth egg (saving it from some crabs), from which hatches a Komodo dragon.; Fourth Egg - After Diego's team all fly to the top of Rescue Island's rocky mountain environment, they abseil down the side of the mountain, whilst navigating through a rock slide, to return the baby Komodo dragon to his family in a hole on the mountainside. They locate the fifth and final egg of a gentoo penguin in a large mountain cave (alarmed with a booby trap, which they narrowly escape), but, after they discover that the egg was already hatched, then they have to locate the penguin, just in time to catch him as he falls from above off a ledge whilst chasing a butterfly.; Fifth Egg - When Diego's team all fly the Rescue Flier to Rescue Island's snowy coast environment, Diego parachutes down (where his Rescue Pack is almost lost in the process, but turns into a balloon and flies back to him), locates the penguin's family (using Juma's GPS map), avoids an avalanche (using Yang's grappling hook rope anchored to a nearby cliff, to swing out of the avalanche's path), and then returns the baby gentoo penguin to his family.; Having completed all five egg missions, returning just before the race deadline, Diego and his team each officially become World Animal Rescuers.
74	14	"Diego Rescues Prince Vicuna"	George Chialtas and Allan Jacobsen	Juan Carlos Perez	Bismarck "Butch" Datuin, Carol Delmindo Datuin, Gary Hartle, Enrico Vilbar Santana, Jose Silverio, and Ysty Veluz	November 5, 2010	414
75	15	"Koala's Birthday Hug"	George Chialtas and Allan Jacobsen	Rosemary Contreras	Enrico Vilbar Santana and Jose Silverio	February 7, 2011 (Note: This episode was first released in The Great Panda Adventure DVD on May 4, 2010.)	408
76	16	"To Babysit a Bobo"	George Chialtas	Brian Bromberg	Bismarck "Butch" Datuin, Carol Delmindo Datuin, Gary Hartle, Enrico Vilbar Santana, Jose Silverio, and Ysty Veluz	February 8, 2011	415
77	17	"Pampas Cat and Friends Help the Rescue Center"	George Chialtas	Maria Escobedo	Bismarck "Butch" Datuin, Enrico Vilbar Santana, Edemer Santos, Jose Silverio, and Ysty Veluz	February 9, 2011	416
78	18	"Cotton-Top Tamarin Cave Rescue"	George Chialtas, Allan Jacobsen, and Henry Lenardin-Madden	Maria Escobedo	Carol Delmindo Datuin, Gary Hartle, Enrico Vilbar Santana, Jose Silverio, and Ysty Veluz	February 10, 2011	413
79–80	19–20	"Fiercest Animals!"	George Chialtas and Allan Jacobsen	Jorge Aguirre	Bismarck "Butch" Datuin, Carol Delmindo Datuin, Enrico Vilbar Santana, and Jose Silverio	September 16, 2011 (Note: This episode was first released on Fiercest Animal Rescues DVD on July 19, 2011.)	417-418 (Note: Also listed under the syndication number #994.)
While Diego and Alicia are giving a cable car guided tour of the Animal Rescue Center to Rosita and Martin, they spot a mother duck's missing duckling in a wounded crocodile's lake enclosure. Diego saves the duckling using Alicia's Lasso as a vine and Alicia then goes off to return the duckling to her mother in Rescue Lake. To dispel Rosita and Martin's misperception that fierce animals are mean, Diego takes the children on a tour of his password-protected (password: "Animales Feroces") Adventure Cave, where Diego has stored numerous mementos and digital images from his adventures with fierce animals, telling various stories of fierce animals that have kept their homes and families safe using their ferocity: While exploring in the rainforest of Central Africa, Diego rescued a gorilla behaving fiercely because it was caught in a trap. Upon release, the gorilla then rescues his own three gorilla babies from two elephants, chasing them away with his fierce gestures (looking fierce, beating his chest and making "Ooh, ooh, ooh!" sounds), which the Gorilla babies start learning to emulate.; From their amphibious Rescue Rover, under the ocean waters off the coast of Australia, Diego and Alicia see a speed boat break a blue-ringed octopus's coral reef home. Diego and Alicia (using their glow sticks) assist the blue-ringed octopus (using its fierce display of glowing blue rings, as a warning of his venomous nature) to ward off some sharks, and then rebuild the octopus' home.; After hearing the distress sounds of a baby grizzly bear while backpacking in Alaska, Diego and his mother locate (with Spotting Scope) and then rescue (with Rescue Pack transformed into a Kayak) the little bear from the wild water of a river. They return the rescued cub to his mother, once they have located the fiercely growling mother and placate her (by Diego and his mother lowering their heads and backing away), who in turn gathers the rest of her other four bear cubs (calling them using her fierce growl) to feed them with fish she catches from the river.; In the grasslands of Africa, when the Rescue Rover (that Diego's father is using to help Diego take photo's of animals for his animal science book) gets caught in quicksand, a full-grown bull hippopotamus dislodges it, by giving it a running push (once he has first given his preemptive warning fierce gestures, by stomping his feet, showing his teeth and wiggling his ears), that not only frees the vehicle, but even leaves a dent in it as well. After Diego and his Father in turn rescue the hippo (using the Rescue Rover's crane) when he gets stranded in the quicksand as a result of that rescue push, he then saves his own baby from two lionesses, by using his fierce gestures.; At the conclusion of Diego's telling of these four stories, Alicia brings Diego's attention to a distressed jaguar who is lost in the town. Travelling out in his Rescue Rover, Diego repairs the Big Jaguar's injury (extracting a nail from its foot) and then assists Big Jaguar to crawling out of the town, thereby avoiding scaring its human inhabitants. Diego takes the Rescue Rover back to the Adventure Cave, where Alicia, Rosita, and Martin have been watching the rescue on the monitor and have put up a new picture on one of the cave walls' screens featuring the Big Jaguar that Diego has just rescued.
