= Mike Bundlie =

American artist, producer, and entrepreneur

- Born: Michael Fargo Bundlie; April 6, 1975 (age 51); Minneapolis, Minnesota, United States
- Education: Roseville Area High School; Carleton College; Minneapolis College of Art and Design
- Occupations: Artist, film and music producer, author, entrepreneur, publisher
- Years active: 1993–present
- Notable work: Monaco Comic Con,Trees of Peace (film), Reactor Motors, Ali NFTs, Da 5 Bloods, Peter Pan Musical, Stan Lee Super Con, Kewl Magazine, Free Candle App, Sid the Science Kid, Pearl Jam App
- Website: Abstract Entertainment / Poets Road

Michael Bundlie (born April 6, 1975) is an American artist, film and music producer, entrepreneur, author and publisher.

== Early life ==
Bundlie was born in Minneapolis, Minnesota, United States. He began his first company at age nine as a manuscript typist for fiction authors. While in high school he started his second company, MiraView Design, which provided design services for national brands.

After high school, Bundlie attended Carleton College and the Minneapolis College of Art and Design where he graduated in 1997.

== Career ==
=== Design and interactive career ===
After moving to Los Angeles, Bundlie provided art direction and design for numerous film, television and animation series including Strawberry Shortcake, SpongeBob SquarePants and Inspector Gadget. He continued on to do character design for animations such as Dragonlance and The Voyages of Young Doctor Dolittle, starring Jane Seymour, Jason Alexander, and Tim Curry. This led him to become Head of Interactive for animation company DIC Entertainment in Burbank, California.

In 2001, he formed Poets Road, a creative technology company. Under his direction, Poets Road has produced websites and apps for large corporations and celebrities. In 2011, Poets Road created the Free Candle App which became a number 1 app in six countries and one of the most downloaded apps of 2011. In 2012, Bundlie launched the Pearl Jam app which continues to be one the top rated band apps on iTunes. Poets Road continues to produce websites and apps.

Bundlie co-authored the worldwide patent for the educational system that became the successful online learning tool ABCmouse.com in 2010.

In January 2017, Bundlie designed an emoji app featuring soccer star Neymar Jr called Neymoji that ranked as the number one celebrity app and the number one entertainment, utility and sports app in multiple countries.

=== Art career ===
Bundlie has done animation and design on various animated and live action titles including Hercules, Stan Lee's Mighty 7, DinoSquad, Rock Dog, Horseland, Strawberry Shortcake, Trollz, Sabrina's Secret Life, and Liberty's Kids. He was commissioned to design the award statue and show graphics for NBC's Ultimate Toy Awards.

In 2018, Bundlie designed, inked and lettered a limited edition comic issue entitled The Marvel Experience written by Cullen Bunn featuring the Avengers, SHIELD and various Marvel villains.

=== NFT art ===
Reactor NFT art, created by Bundlie, became the first NFT art to be announced to be actively being translated into a feature film on March 14, 2024.

On January 4, 2022, NFT company Metacurio licensed Bundlie's art for an NFT collection called Reactor Motors which was released on Opensea. The collection consisted of 8888 unique 3D animated videos of virtual reactors based on the fictional story written by Bundlie which Metacurio is adapting into a mobile racing game. One Reactor NFT owner was also gifted a one of a kind real world McLaren designed by Bundlie popularly known as the Iron McLaren due to its inspiration being drawn from the superhero Iron Man. The Reactor Motors inspired comic book title "Reactor 2042" debuted during a panel discussion about the future of comic books at the 2022 Stan Lee Super Con.

=== Film producing ===
A member of the Producers Guild of America, Bundlie began producing in 2012 with the Sid the Science Kid Movie. In 2015, he established Abstract Entertainment with Barry Levine.

On September 4, 2015, Variety announced the upcoming film "Monkey", a modern-day follow up to the classic Chinese fable of Journey to the West with Mike Bundlie and Barry Levine producing under their production company Abstract Entertainment along with co-production partner Eracme Entertainment.

The 2022 award-winning film "Trees of Peace" that debuted June 10 on Netflix, was produced by Mike Bundlie, Barry Levine, Ron Ray, and others. Written and Directed by Alanna Brown, the film follows the powerful struggles of four women trying survive the Rwandan Genocide. The film became a top 4 film in over 60 countries on Netflix.

Recent films executive produced by Bundlie include Da 5 Bloods directed by Spike Lee on Netflix starring Chadwick Boseman, Norm of the North Family Vacation, and the thriller No Escape starring Keegan Allen and Holland Roden.

Bundlie was tapped to develop a film production of the bestselling novel The Diamond Age by Neal Stephenson with Road Pictures and script by Karl Gajdusek (Oblivion and Stranger Things).

Deadline Hollywood announced on March 14, 2024 that Pierre Morel, director of Taken and Transporter 2 was attached to direct a feature film based on the NFT artwork and storyline created by Bundlie. The film will be produced by Bundlie, Barry Levine, Morel and Renee Tab.

=== Writing career ===
In 2003, Bundlie co-wrote a non-fiction book teaching financial literacy to kids entitled Make More Than Your Parents with Kevin O'Donnell and Bart Diliddo. The book featured an interactive CD-Rom.

In 2007, Bundlie co-wrote a hardcover fiction book, Adventures in the Arts with Denise Bradley. The book was the first to feature the PTA logo on the cover as it allowed the reader to complete a full Arts curriculum while reading.

=== Publishing career ===
Kewl Magazine was created by Mike Bundlie (Publisher), Denise Bradley (Editor-In-Chief), DIC Entertainment and Geffen Records in 2007 with Bundlie and Bradley becoming full owners in 2008. The magazine was licensed for a TV Series called Everything KEWL that aired on CBS in 2007 and later as the brand for the entire Saturday Morning TV block called KEWLOPOLIS on CBS. KEWL was the first music-focused magazine geared specifically to tweens and celebrated its launch by sponsoring Miley Cyrus's Best of Both Worlds Tour.

Beginning in 2019, Bundlie began mentoring future authors and artists through investments and creative assistance including the Kippi the Conqueror book series by author Kady Oliker Eshleman.

For the Moves Magazine Power Women Annual Gala, Bundlie printed the fine art book celebrating the 100 powerful women had adorned the cover of Moves Magazine.

Feb 2, 2024 Abstract Comics announced a new series called Lost Souls of Saturn in partnership with the music group of the same name and artist Rob Shields. The first two issues which included augmented reality panels featuring animation and music were available at the opening night event and sold out.

=== Interactive and live events ===
Starting in 2014 became a producer and creative on The Marvel Experience, a touring interactive park based on the characters from Marvel superhero universe that tours around the world in which visitors train to be Agents of SHIELD.

In November 2019, Bundlie produced the first ever Stan Lee Super Con, a large scale Comic Convention, in Riyadh, Saudi Arabia. The event drew dozens of celebrities including members of the cast of Entourage, The Sopranos, Vampire Diaries, Doctor Strange, Avengers: Endgame, and more. Famed comic artists such as Rob Liefeld, and Bob Layton. The show lasted three days and drew over 60,000 attendees. The first international convention of its kind in the country, the event has helped open the doors of American Pop Culture for local fans.

Stan Lee's Super Con returned to Saudi Arabia in June 2022 produced by Bundlie, where from June 9–11 over a dozen hollywood celebrities and artists entertained tens of thousands of fans at the Jeddah Super Dome. Attendees included Shazam's Zachary Levi, Guardians of the Galaxy star Michael Rooker, Eternal's Lauren Ridloff, Viking's Clive Standen, and more. The show included multiple interactive exhibits including the Cinema Watch Collection, and the Premiere Gallery that featured rare comic first appearances of a wide variety of superheroes. The event also celebrated the 100th anniversary of Stan Lee's birth.

Bundlie spoke at the 2023 Creativity Conference which was to be set in Reykjavik but was moved online due to the volcano eruption. He gave four talks about the future of AI in entertainment and the transition of NFTs into mainstream media.

In partnership with Lost Souls of Saturn (made up of DJ Seth Troxler and Phil Moffa) and artist Rob Shields, Bundlie along with Abstract Comics, a division of Abstract Entertainment, launched a new comic series called Lost Souls of Saturn at fully immersive augmented event on Feb 2, 2024 at the W1 Curates museum on Oxford St in London. The event celebrated the augmented exhibit in which floor to ceiling LED screens inside and outside the building came to life when using the custom built mobile app.

November 15-17 of 2024, Bundlie produced the first ever Comic Con in Monaco at the prestigious Grimaldi Forum. The Monaco Comic Con Prelude was an introduction of this type of event in preparation for the full version to be held in 2025. The Prelude featured guests including Scott Eastwood, Shameless' Steve Howey, cast members from Northern Exposure, Vampire Diaries, The Descendants, Star Wars, and Big Time Rush. On the 16th Bundlie hosted an intimate concert with First Day of School opening for the Plain White T's and an award ceremony for renowned actress Elsa Zylberstein. On the 17th, he gave a talk about how Abstract Entertainment turns Art into Movies and kicked off the first public screening of Jason Reitman's movie "Saturday Night".

=== Theatre ===
Bundlie produced the first production of a Broadway Musical in Saudi Arabia in November 2019. The twenty-show run of Peter Pan featured over thirty cast members, the World Tour sets and was done in conjunction with Thomas McCoy and the legendary Cathy Rigby.

As part of Broadway's comeback in 2021, Bundlie produced Candace Bushnell's critically acclaimed show "Is There Still Sex in the City" based on the best selling book of the same title. The show opened in November 2021 to glowing reviews.

Bundlie was announced to be producing a new musical about Nikola Tesla for stage. The announcement came at the debut of the musical's Concept Cast album.

=== Music producing ===
For the upcoming Musical "Tesla" about the life of Nikola Tesla, Bundlie produced a Concept Cast recording released on March 14, 2024 (pi day) featuring an all-star cast with the talents of West End stars Oliver Savile and Tim Howar, Pia Toscano, Bethany Joy Lenz of One Tree Hill fame, Tony Amendola, Clive Standen from Vikings, Denise Bradley and Bradley Bundlie. The album includes the singers backed by a full orchestra and choir. The debut release was celebrated with an impromptu live performance at the Space Barn in Venice, CA with some of the album performers joined by Broadway and TV stars including James Snyder, Juliette Goglia, Brent Schindele, Danielle Bessler, Lucy Martin and social media star Nathan Kessel.

The Tesla charity concert also included the March 11 debut album release for 11 year old piano prodigy Bowie Bundlie, entitled "This goes to 11" which was produced by Bundlie and top selling pianist Jim Wilson with eleven instrumental piano songs including four originals by the artist.

In December 2020, Bundlie produced and mastered the album "Snow" by Bethany Joy Lenz of One Tree Hill fame. It featured six holiday songs including four originals by Bethany Joy. The album was released under Poets Road Records and was Top 10 on the iTunes Christmas Charts and Top 50 on the Overall Albums Charts.

Following up on the success of 2020, Bundlie produced the first Christmas album for singer Pia Toscano entitled "Christmas with You" with six songs including classics White Christmas, "Baby It's Cold Outside" featuring Broadway artist Erich Bergen, "O Holy Night", "Jingle Bell Rock", "Ave Maria" and the breakthrough original "Fall All Over Again" written by Denise Bradley. The album reached Top 10 on the iTunes News Christmas Charts.

=== Chocolate ===
In 2021, Bundlie founded artisan chocolate house ChocoLab with two partners. The company produces high end chocolate bars in collaboration with well known celebrities and brands.

=== Charity ===
Bundlie actively assists a variety of charities. Currently he is actively involved in supporting the band First Day of School in their charity through music mission supporting a variety of kid-centric charities as seen on the Kelly Clarkson show. In 2019, he was awarded his second Kiwanis award by the Kiwanis Club of Burbank.

== See also ==
- Kewl Magazine
