= Matt Hunter (singer) =

American singer (born 1998)

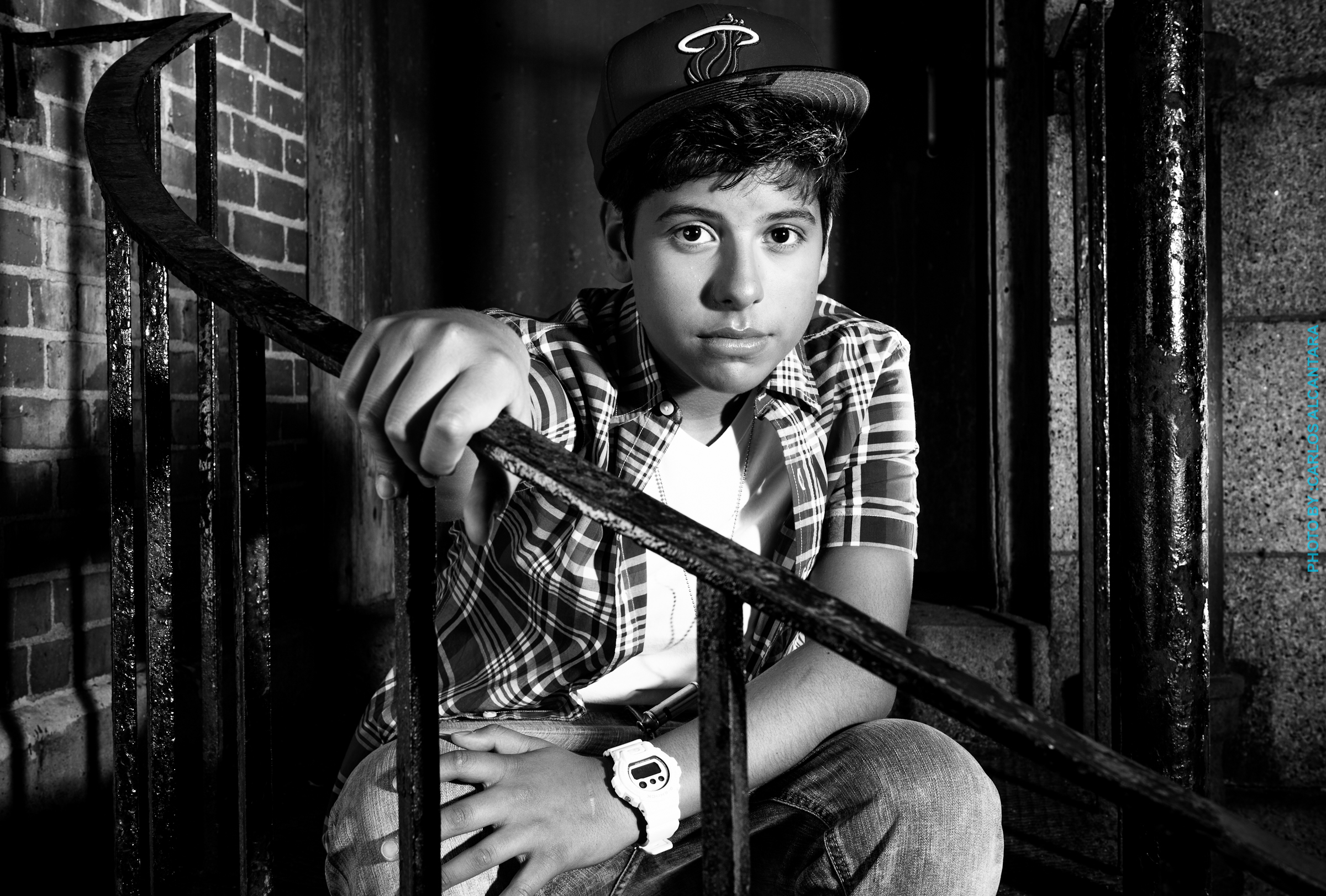
- Hunter in 2012

Background information
- Born: Matthew Alexander Hunter Correa; February 20, 1998 (age 28); New York City, U.S.
- Genres: Latin pop; R&B
- Occupations: Singer; songwriter; voice actor
- Instruments: Vocals; piano; guitar
- Years active: 2009–present
- Spouse: Carla Inostroza (married 2026-present)
- Website: matthunterworld.com

Matthew Alexander Hunter Correa (born February 20, 1998), known professionally as Matt Hunter, is an American singer.

== Early life ==
Hunter was born on February 20, 1998, in New York City, and raised in Paramus, New Jersey. His mother is Colombian, and his father is Italian.

== Career ==
=== Music ===
Hunter worked in voice acting from ages 9 to 12, at which point he began posting YouTube videos of himself playing the guitar and singing various covers, occasionally in Spanish. His videos went viral and he traveled around Latin America building his fan base in a grass roots fashion. Around this time, he was dubbed the "Latino Justin Bieber". Marc Anthony later called Hunter "the future" of music.

At 13, Hunter released his first single, "Mi Amor". He released follow-up singles in English and Spanish, "Right Here, Right Now" and "Mi Senorita", in 2012, and then his EP Right Here, Right Now. For the 2014 FIFA World Cup, he released the songs "Minha Mina Ta Loca" and "Mi Chica Esta Loca" with Pitbull, in both Portuguese and Spanish versions. By 2016 he had amassed 200,000 subscribers on his YouTube channel and over 500,000 Twitter followers.

Hunter splits his time between New York, Los Angeles, Miami, and Latin America.

=== Television ===
As a voice actor, Hunter played the singing role of Diego Márquez in the final two seasons of The Nickelodeon animated television series Go, Diego, Go! and played the same character in Dora the Explorer. He auditioned for the role when he was 10, recording the voice of Diego until he was 12. He also released his weekly comedy webisode series Fuego Fridays.

=== Performances ===
Hunter has performed live in the United States, Puerto Rico, Mexico, Spain, Chile, Brazil, Dominican Republic, Colombia, Argentina, Costa Rica and Ecuador. In May 2013, he headlined and sold out Chile's 12,000 seat Movistar Arena.

== Awards and nominations ==
Hunter was nominated for Favorite Pop Artist at the 2013 Premios Juventud, presented by Univision (which did actually carry Spanish dubs of both Dora the Explorer and Go, Diego, Go! (two shows that Hunter did voice work on) as part of its Planeta U block from 2008 to 2014).

== Filmography ==
Year	Title	Role	Notes
2009–11	Go, Diego, Go!	Singing Diego	Main role (Seasons 4–5)
2009–11	Dora the Explorer	Singing Diego	Main role (Season 6)

== Discography ==
EPs

Title and details
Right Here, Right Now
- Credited to: Matt Hunter
- Type: EP
- Released: September 13, 2013
- Record label: Plaza Independencia
Notes

No.	Title	Length
1.	"Mi Señorita"	3:42
2.	"Mi Amor"	3:20
3.	"Te Vi"	3:01
4.	"Right Here, Right Now"	3:08
5.	"Celular"	3:17
6.	"Mi Señorita (karaoke)"	3:46
7.	"Mi Amor (karaoke)"	3:18
8.	"Te Vi (karaoke)"	3:05
9.	"Right Here, Right Now (karaoke)"	3:24
10.	"Celular (karaoke)"	3:15

Singles

- "Home for the Holidays" (2011)
- "Mi Señorita" (2012)
- "Mi Amor" (2012)
- "Right Here, Right Now" (2013)
- "Te Vi" (2014)
- "Mi Chica Está Loca" (2014)
  - "Mi Chica Está Loca" (alternative version feat. Pitbull) (2014)
- "Mas Que Tu Amigo" (2015)
- "Te Necesito" (feat. Augusto Schuster) (2016)
- "Amor Real" (2017)
- "Dicen" (duet with Lele Pons) (2018)
- "Lista De Espera" (feat. Isabela Moner) (2018)
- "Una Vez Más" (feat. Tommy Boysen) (2019)
- "Cazador" (feat. Lenny Tavarez) (2019)
- "Problemas" (feat. GASHI, Big Soto) (2019)
- "Entera" (with Carla Fernandes) (2020)
- "Suave" (with Corina Smith) (2020)
- "Error" (with Lalo Ebratt) (2020)

Covers

- "All of Me" (from John Legend) (2014)
- "Todo Cambiara" (Spanish version of Justin Timberlake's "Not a Bad Thing") (2015)

Featured in

- "Fiesta" (StereO 4 feat. Matt Hunter) (2014)
