= Dance and Sing! The Best of Nick Jr. =

Compilation album by Various artists
- Released: October 2, 2001; 24 years ago
- Recorded: 1994–2001
- Genre: Children's music
- Length: 44:28
- Label: Nick Jr./Kid Rhino
- Producer: Viacom

Dance and Sing! The Best of Nick Jr. is an album released on Tuesday, October 2, 2001 on CD and cassette from Kid Rhino. The CD includes songs from some of the most popular Nick Jr. programs, including Face, Nick Jr. Sings, Dora the Explorer, Little Bill, Little Bear, Blue's Clues, Gullah Gullah Island, Oswald, Maggie and the Ferocious Beast, Franklin, Maisy, and Kipper. The album was scored by Tanner "Bones" Jones. The album charted at No. 16 on the Billboard Top Kid Audio chart. All content is owned by its creators (including Paramount Global).

== Tracks ==
The CD has 44 tracks which included:

| No. | Title | Length |
|---|---|---|
| 1. | "Doo Doo Tee Doo" | 0:17 |
| 2. | "Freres Jacques" | 0:22 |
| 3. | "Country Hop" | 0:51 |
| 4. | "Colors" | 1:32 |
| 5. | "Tracing Shapes" | 1:20 |
| 6. | "Funky Jelly Monster" | 2:11 |
| 7. | "Moo-Moo" | 1:43 |
| 8. | "FACE Mambo" | 0:47 |
| 9. | "Spelling FACE" | 0:47 |
| 10. | "Blue's Clues Theme" | 0:58 |
| 11. | "The Planet Song" | 2:12 |
| 12. | "Healthy Snacks" | 1:41 |
| 13. | "Oranges Grow on Trees" | 0:50 |
| 14. | "The Buddy Boogie" | 2:46 |
| 15. | "So Long Song" | 0:41 |
| 16. | "Humming" | 0:32 |
| 17. | "Little Bear Theme" | 1:02 |
| 18. | "Little Bear's Band" | 0:35 |
| 19. | "Gullah Gullah Vignette" | 0:26 |
| 20. | "Gullah Gullah Island Theme" | 0:54 |
| 21. | "Down Down Baby" | 1:52 |
| 22. | "Yes I Can" | 1:27 |
| 23. | "I Love a Haircut" | 1:25 |
| 24. | "Head and Shoulders" | 1:42 |
| 25. | "Nick Jr. Sings" | 0:32 |
| 26. | "Oswald Theme" | 0:46 |
| 27. | "The Penguin Polka" | 0:59 |
| 28. | "I Guess You Never Know" | 0:34 |
| 29. | "Roller Skating" | 0:29 |
| 30. | "Maisy Theme" | 2:09 |
| 31. | "Franklin Theme" | 1:04 |
| 32. | "Maggie and the Ferocious Beast Theme" | 0:31 |
| 33. | "My One and Only Box" | 0:49 |
| 34. | "Hamilton the Ham" | 1:02 |
| 35. | "Kipper Theme" | 0:47 |
| 36. | "Little Bill Cube Checkers Open" | 1:03 |
| 37. | "Little Bill Cube Checkers Close" | 0:59 |
| 38. | "Alphabet Song" | 0:23 |
| 39. | "Dora the Explorer Theme" | 0:43 |
| 40. | "Map Song" | 0:32 |
| 41. | "Backpack Song" | 0:26 |
| 42. | "Travel Song" | 0:43 |
| 43. | "We Did It" | 0:39 |
| 44. | "Goodbye Song" | 0:25 |
