= Go, Diego, Go! =

American animated children's television series

- Genre: Animated series Adventure
- Created by: Chris Gifford; Valerie Walsh Valdes
- Voices of: Jake T. Austin; Brandon Zambrano; Matt Hunter; Constanza Sperakis; Serena Kerrigan; Gabriela Aisenberg; Rosie Perez; Keeler Sandhaus; Kyle Brenn; Thomas Sharkey; Dylan Clark Marshall
- Theme music composer: George Noriega; Joel Someillan
- Opening theme: "Go, Diego, Go! Theme"
- Ending theme: "Al Rescate, Amigos!" (instrumental)
- Composers: Steve Sandberg; Jed Becker
- Country of origin: United States
- Original languages: English; Spanish
- No. of seasons: 4
- No. of episodes: 80 (list of episodes)

Production
- Executive producers: Chris Gifford; Valerie Walsh Valdes
- Producers: Cathy Galeota; Miken Wong
- Running time: 23 minutes
- Production companies: Nickelodeon Animation Studio; Nick Jr. Productions (seasons 1–3)

Original release
- Network: Nickelodeon (2005–11); Nick Jr. Channel (2013) (Note: "Egyptian Camel Adventure")
- Release: September 6, 2005 – July 13, 2013

Related
- Dora the Explorer

Go, Diego, Go! is an American animated children's television series that aired on Nickelodeon from September 6, 2005, to July 13, 2013, with 80 episodes across four seasons. Created and executive produced by Chris Gifford and Valerie Walsh Valdes, the series is a spin-off of the animated television series Dora the Explorer and follows Dora's cousin Diego, an 8-year-old boy whose adventures often involve rescuing animals and protecting the environment. The series also aired in reruns on Nick Jr. on CBS from September 17, 2005, to September 9, 2006.

The series received favorable reviews from critics and garnered acclaim for its portrayal of a bilingual Latino lead character, winning four NAACP Image Award nominations for "Outstanding Children's Program" from 2008 to 2012, and also winning for the Imagen Award and Young Artist Award for Jake T. Austin's role as the voice of Diego.

== Premise ==
Diego and Baby Jaguar

The series follows Diego, who helps animals in danger. His cousin is Dora from Dora the Explorer, who also appears in the series; prior to Go, Diego, Go!, Diego debuted in the Dora the Explorer episode "Meet Diego!" and appeared throughout the series since then. In most episodes, Diego hears an animal's call for help at the Animal Rescue Center and sets out to rescue them. Like Dora the Explorer, the show teaches Spanish, but it is not its primary purpose. Supporting characters include Diego's sisters Alicia and Daisy, his companion Baby Jaguar, Click, an anthropomorphic camera who locates animals, and Rescue Pack, an anthropomorphic orange messenger bag Diego wears who can transform into any object. The antagonists are the Bobo Brothers, a pair of anthropomorphic spider monkeys who, like Swiper in Dora the Explorer, cause mischief and can be stopped by shouting "Freeze, Bobos!" However, unlike Swiper, they do not intentionally cause trouble.

Whenever a carnivorous predator is featured on the show, its diet is not mentioned, unlike when herbivores are shown. There are exceptions to this, including when an octopus is shown and discussed eating crabs, when a baby river dolphin eats the crabs heading toward a waterfall, when Tuga, a leatherback sea turtle, eats jellyfish, and when Jorge, a hawk, eats grasshoppers, however, these prey are not anthropomorphized. Also, when a predator threatens a featured animal, they are described as being "afraid" of them.

== Episodes ==
Season	Episodes	Originally released	
Season	Episodes	First released	Last released
1	19	September 6, 2005	October 15, 2007
2	19	October 2, 2006	March 7, 2008
3	18	March 21, 2008	July 13, 2013
4	18	September 28, 2009	September 16, 2011

=== Home video and streaming ===
In 2006, a year after Go, Diego, Go! premiered, the show had several DVD and VHS releases. In 2008, Go, Diego, Go! became available on iTunes. The show is available to stream on Paramount+.

== Characters ==
=== Main cast ===
- Diego Márquez (speaking voice by Jake T. Austin in Seasons 1–3, Matt Hunter as singing voice in Season 4, and Brandon Zambrano as speaking voice in Season 4) is an 8-year-old Latino boy who is bilingual, as he speaks both English and Spanish, and rescues and cares deeply for animals. His diet is not mentioned, but it is implied that he is not vegetarian.
- Alicia Márquez (voiced by Constanza Sperakis in Seasons 1–2, Serena Kerrigan in Season 3, and Gabriela Aisenberg in Season 4) is Diego's 12-year-old sister, who is skilled with using computers and is also bilingual. She aids Diego by directing animal rescue calls that come into the center and assisting with rescues.
- Daisy (voiced by Iliana Friedson-Trujillo) is Diego and Alicia's older sister, who is usually away at college, but appears in "The Bobo's Mother's Day!" after returning home from college.
- Mrs. Márquez Sabrina (voiced by KJ Sanchez) is Diego’s Mother, who work as animal scientists.
- Mr. Márquez Nico (voiced by Sebastian Arcelus) is Diego’s Father, who work as animal scientists.
- Baby Jaguar (voiced by Thomas Sharkey in Seasons 1–3 and Dylan Clark Marshall in Season 4) is a jaguar cub and Diego's best friend, who met him when he came to his aid.
- Click (voiced by Rosie Perez) is a camera who identifies animals and their location by hearing their voices.
- Rescue Pack (voiced by Keeler Sandhaus in Seasons 1–3 and Kyle Brenn in Season 4) is an orange backpack that can transform into any object Diego needs.
- The Bobo Brothers (voiced by Jose Zelaya in Seasons 1–3 and Andres Filipe Aristizabal in Season 4) are mischievous spider monkeys who cause much trouble and mischief.
- Linda (voiced by Laura Abreu) is a llama who, like Baby Jaguar, met Diego when he came to her aid.
- Dora Márquez (voiced by Kathleen Herles) is Diego's cousin and the protagonist of Dora the Explorer, who sometimes helps with rescue missions.
- Boots (voiced by Harrison Chad) is a monkey who is Dora's best friend.
- Backpack (voiced by Sasha Toro) is Dora's purple backpack, who carries objects that she may need.
- Map (voiced by Marc Weiner) is Dora's map, who aids her by showing her where she needs to go.

=== Guest stars ===
- Olga Merediz as Mrs. Márquez Sabrina (Diego's mother)
- Kelly Ripa as Mommy Maned Wolf
- Adam Alexi-Malle as Jamal the Camel
- Héctor Elizondo as Victor Vicuña and King Vicuña

== Broadcast ==
In the United States, Go, Diego, Go! first aired with the episode "Diego Saves the Mommy and Baby Sloth" as a sneak peek on Noggin throughout the week of August 22 to August 28, 2005. The show would make its official primetime premiere on Nickelodeon on September 6, 2005 at 8:00 p.m. ET with the episode "Rescue of the Red-Eyed Tree Frogs", before airing on the Nick Jr. block the next day. The show also aired on CBS within its Saturday morning Nick Jr. on CBS children's block from September 17, 2005, to the block's discontinuation on September 9, 2006. Spanish-language broadcast network Univision aired the show on its Saturday morning children's block, Planeta U, from its debut on April 5, 2008, until May 24, 2014, to accommodate the launch of the "Disney Junior en Univision" sub-block the following week. The last episode, "Egyptian Camel Adventure", aired on July 13, 2013, with reruns continuing on the Nick Jr. Channel through August 31, 2018.

In Canada, the show aired on Nickelodeon and Treehouse TV. In the UK, the show aired on Nickelodeon, Nick Jr., and Nick Jr. 2. In Australia, the show aired on Nickelodeon, Nick Jr., and Nine Network. In India, the show aired on Nickelodeon, and Nick Jr.

== Home media ==
=== DVD releases ===
DVD name	Episodes	Release date
The Great Dinosaur Rescue	"The Great Dinosaur Rescue"; "Diego Saves Baby Humpback Whale"; "Rescue of the Red-Eyed Tree Frogs"	Region 1: February 21, 2006 July 29, 2008 (reissue); Region 2: November 2, 2009; Region 4: July 1, 2010
Wolf Pup Rescue	"Diego's Wolf Pup Rescue"; "A Booboo on the Pygmy Marmoset"; "Diego Saves Mommy and Baby Sloth"; "Three Little Condors"	Region 1: September 19, 2006
Diego Saves Christmas!	"Diego Saves Christmas"; "Pepito's Penguin School"; "A Blue Morpho Butterfly is Born!"; "Save the Sea Turtles"	Region 1: October 24, 2006; Region 4: November 4, 2009
The Great Jaguar Rescue	"The Great Jaguar Rescue!"; "Little Kinkajou is in Beehive Trouble!"; "The Mommy Macaw"; "Chinta the Baby Chinchilla"	Region 1: January 16, 2007; Region 2: May 11, 2009 (UK) July 2, 2012 (South Africa); Region 4: June 19, 2008 June 5, 2015
Underwater Mystery	"An Underwater Mystery"; "Diego Saves Baby River Dolphin"; "Journey to Jaguar Mountain"; "Chito and Rita the Spectacled Bears"	Region 1: March 20, 2007; Region 4: March 5, 2009
The Iguana Sing Along (Region 1); Diego's Great Iguana Adventure (Region 4)	"The Iguana Sing Along"; "Diego and Alicia Save the Otters"; "Linda the Librarian"; "Cool Water for Ana the Anaconda"	Region 1: May 22, 2007; Region 4: April 7, 2015
Ready, Set, Go!	"Rainforest Race"; "The Great Roadrunner Race"; "The Tapir's Trip Home"; "Baby Jaguar to the Rescue"	Region 1: July 3, 2007; Region 2: February 11, 2013; Region 4: July 6, 2015
Safari Rescue	"Diego's Safari Rescue"; "Panchita the Prairie Dog"; "Jorge the Little Hawk Learns to Migrate"	Region 1: October 9, 2007; Region 4: June 18, 2009
Diego's Magical Missions	"Kicho's Magic Flute!"; "Green Iguana Helps Abuelito Plant a New Strawberry Farm!"; "Diego and Baby Humpback to the Rescue!"; "Giant Octopus to the Rescue!"	Region 1: February 5, 2008; Region 2: September 14, 2009; Region 4: June 18, 2009
Moonlight Rescue	"Tuga Helps the Moon"; "Rhea is an Animal Rescuer"; "Rainforest Rhapsody"	Region 1: March 18, 2008; Region 4: September 4, 2013
Great Gorilla!	"Gorilla Fun"; "Egyptian Camel Adventure"; "Diego and Dora Save the Giant Tortoises!"; "Super Flying Squirrel to the Rescue!"	Region 1: June 3, 2008
Diego's Halloween	"Freddie the Fruit Bat Saves Halloween!"; "Diego and Dora Help Baby Monarch Get to the Festival"; "Alicia Saves the Crocodile!"; "Manatee's Mermaid Rescue!"	Region 1: August 26, 2008; Region 4: October 1, 2009
It's a Bugs' World	"It's a Bugs' World!"; "Alicia and Whitetail to the Rescue!"; "Diego the Hero!"; "Whistling Willie Finds a Buddy"	Region 1: October 21, 2008; Region 4: March 4, 2010
Rainforest Fiesta!	"Diego and Porcupine Save the Pinata!"; "A New Flamingo Mami"; "Macky the Macaroni Penguin"; "Linda the Llama Saves Carnival"	Region 1: March 31, 2009; Region 4: September 23, 2010
Diego's Arctic Rescue	"The Great Polar Bear Rescue!"; "Puffin Fishing Adventure"; "Where is Okapi's Brother?"	Region 1: September 15, 2009; Region 4: March 6, 2015
Lion Cub Rescue	"Welcome Home, Lion Cub"; "Diego's Ringed Seal Rescue"; "Diego Reunites Hippo & Oxpecker"; "Diego's Orangutan Rescue"	Region 1: January 26, 2010; Region 4: September 1, 2011
Diego's Ultimate Rescue League	"Diego's International Rescue League"; "Ocean Animal Rescuer"; "Diego Rescues Prince Vicuña"	Region 1: August 31, 2010; Region 4: May 23, 2012
Diego Saves the World	"Diego the Hero!"; "Cotton-top Tamarin Cave Rescue"; "Bengal Tiger Makes a Wish"; "Diego Saves Baby Humpback Whale"; "Jorge the Little Hawk Learns to Migrate"; "Egyptian Camel Adventure"	Region 1: April 12, 2011; Region 2: April 2, 2012
Fiercest Animal Rescues! S.O.S. Animaux Sauvages (Region 2 – France)	"Fiercest Animals!"; "Cotton-top Tamarin Cave Rescue"; "Pampas and Friends Help the Rescue Center"	Region 1: July 19, 2011; Region 2 (France): April 6, 2017; Region 4: June 19, 2013
Journey to the Great Pyramids	"The Bobos' Mother's Day"; "Egyptian Camel Adventure"; "Super Flying Squirrel to the Rescue!"; "Diego and Dora Save the Giant Tortoises!"	Region 4: October 24, 2012
The Great Panda Adventure	"All Aboard the Giant Panda Express!"; "Koala's Birthday Hug"; "Leaping Lemurs"; "Diego Saves the Beavers"	Region 4: March 6, 2015

Nickelodeon, with Paramount for Region 1 released a number of DVDs featuring one episode from a variety of the animated television series they have produced, including Go, Diego, Go!, Dora the Explorer, Blue's Clues, Bubble Guppies, The Fresh Beat Band, Ni Hao, Kai-Lan, Team Umizoomi, Wonder Pets!, and Yo Gabba Gabba!, an average of six on each DVD.

DVD name	Episode	Release date
All-Star Sports Day	"Rainforest Race"	Region 1: March 10, 2009
Celebrate Family!	"The Bobos' Mother's Day"	Region 1: June 9, 2009 April 2, 2013
Nickelodeon Favorites: Animal Friends!	"Diego and Alicia Save the Otters"	Region 1: September 15, 2009
Nick Jr. Favorites: We Love Our Friends	"Sammy's Valentine"	Region 1: January 5, 2010 December 25, 2012
Nick Jr. Favorites: Go Green!	"Manatee's Mermaid Rescue!"	Region 1: March 30, 2010
Nickelodeon Favorites: The First Day of School	"Linda the Librarian"	Region 1: July 13, 2010
Nickelodeon Favorites: Happy Halloween	"Freddie the Fruit Bat Saves Halloween!"	Region 1: August 24, 2010
Nickelodeon Favorites: Sisters and Brothers	"To Babysit a Bobo"	Region 1: February 8, 2011
Nickelodeon Favorites: Food with Friends!	"Green Iguana Helps Abuelito Plant a New Strawberry Farm"	Region 1: May 17, 2011
Nickelodeon Favorites: Summer Vacation	"Panchita the Prairie Dog"	Region 1: June 21, 2011
Nickelodeon Favorites: Merry Christmas!	"Diego Saves Christmas!"	Region 1: October 4, 2011; Region 4: November 7, 2012
Nickelodeon Favorites: Dance to the Music	"The Iguana Sing Along"	Region 1: February 28, 2012; Region 4: March 20, 2013
Let's Learn – 123s	"Three Little Condors"	Region 1: January 15, 2013 June 24, 2014
Let's Learn: ABCs	"Linda the Librarian"	Region 1: January 15, 2013
Nickelodeon Favorites: Rootin' Tootin' Wild West	"The Great Roadrunner Race"	Region 1: January 29, 2013

Go Diego Go! episodes featured as bonus episodes in the DVD releases of Dora the Explorer, produced primarily by Paramount.

DVD name	Episode	Release date
Dora the Explorer: Dora and the 3 Little Pigs	"A Booboo on the Pygmy Marmoset"	Region 2 (UK): February 13, 2012; Region 4: March 22, 24, 2012
Dora the Explorer: It's Haircut Day!	"Linda the Llama Saves Carnival"	Region 4: May 29, 2013
Dora the Explorer: Dora's Ballet Adventures	"The Iguana Sing-Along"	Region 2 (UK): May 11, 2009 September 1, 2011; Region 4: September 1, 2011 May 28, 2014
Dora the Explorer: Dora's Enchanted Forest Adventures	"Diego the Hero"	Region 2 (UK): November 14, 2011; Region 4: November 3, 2010
Dora the Explorer: First Bike	"Pepito's Penguin School"	Region 4: June 20, 2012 October 12, 2012
Dora the Explorer: Dora's Easter Adventure	"Kicho's Magic Flute"	Region 2 (UK): March 25, 2013; Region 2 (South Africa): March 25, 2013; Region 4: March 6, 2013
Dora the Explorer: Dora's Rescue in Mermaid Kingdom	"Cool Water for Ana the Anaconda"	Region 2 (UK): June 17, 2013; Region 2 (South Africa): June 3, 2013; Region 4: June 26, 2013
Dora the Explorer: Dora's Butterfly Ball	"A Blue Morpho Butterfly is Born"	Region 4: February 26, 2014
Dora the Explorer: Dora Rocks!	"Alicia and Whitetail to the Rescue!"	Region 2 (South Africa): July 21, 2014; Region 4: November 6, 2013
Dora the Explorer: Dora in Wonderland	"Little Kinkajou is in Beehive Trouble"	Region 2 (South Africa): August 8, 2014; Region 4: June 25, 2014
Dora the Explorer: Dora's Magical Sleepover	"To Babysit a Bobo"	Region 2 (UK): December 25, 2013; Region 4: January 7, 14, 2015

== In other media ==
=== Films ===
Diego is featured in the live-action Dora film Dora and the Lost City of Gold played by Jeff Wahlberg. Diego is also featured in the sequel Dora and the Search for Sol Dorado played by Jacob Rodriguez.

=== Live shows ===
A live show called The Great Jaguar Rescue is about Diego saving Baby Jaguar's growl. This is also the premise of an episode of the series that aired on January 15, 2007. A touring live version of the series was staged in 2007, starring Richard J. Portela as the role of Diego.
