= Kewl Magazine =

US teen magazine

- Editor-in-Chief: Denise Bradley
- Categories: Teen magazine
- Frequency: Monthly
- Publisher: KEWL, LLC (DIC Entertainment)
- Founder: Mike Bundlie; Denise Bradley
- First issue: April 2007
- Final issue: 2010
- Company: Poets Road
- Country: United States
- Based in: Burbank, California
- Language: English

Kewl Magazine was an American national teen magazine distributed in North America. It was published by DIC Entertainment and was located in Burbank, California, with distribution at mass merchandisers and bookstore chains throughout the country. The magazine was in circulation between 2007 and 2010.

== History ==
Kewl Magazine was co-founded by Mike Bundlie and Denise Bradley in 2007 and was published by KEWL, LLC. DIC Entertainment and music label Geffen Records were involved in the first two issues of the magazine. The first issue appeared in April 2007. The magazine was owned and controlled by KEWL, LLC with DIC Entertainment (later Cookie Jar Entertainment, now WildBrain) having a sub-minority equity stake. Originally launched as a promotional quarterly magazine (spring and summer), Kewl became monthly following its Holiday Issue (Dec./Jan. 2007). The magazine released ten issues per year.

Soon, it got a Saturday morning block named after it called "KEWLopolis", but it was taken off the air in Fall 2009.

The first issue featured Zac Efron from Hairspray.

Kewl Magazine featured interviews with teen celebrities as well as full poster pages. It also featured reviews on movies, music, DVDs, video games, gear, gadgets and books, as well as regular GO GREEN environmental sections, beauty, fashion, and fitness sections. The cover image and cover story usually featured a recent teen star.
