= Joseph Ianniello =

American media executive (born 1968)

- Born: Joseph R. Ianniello; 1968 (age 57–58); Brooklyn, New York, U.S.
- Other name: Joe
- Education: Pace University (BS); Columbia University (MBA)
- Occupation: Chairman of CBS Entertainment Group (2019-2020)

Joseph R. Ianniello is an American business executive who is the CEO and chairman of Argus Capital Corp., a special purpose acquisition company. He is the former Chairman, President, and CEO of CBS Entertainment Group unit of ViacomCBS.

== Career ==
=== CBS ===
Ianniello started his career at CBS in 1997 as Director of Financial Planning.

His next move within CBS was as its Vice President of Corporate Development from 2000 to 2005. At that position, Mr. Ianniello was in charge of all financial planning matters at CBS including investor relations. He became Senior Vice President of Finance and Treasurer of Viacom Inc. in July, 2005. During that time, he was involved in many of the mergers and acquisitions including the acquisitions of BET, Comedy Central and Sportsline. He was also involved in the divestiture of Blockbuster.

In December 2015, he served as Senior Vice President of Finance and Treasurer of CBS Corporation.

During the time since, he was Director of Entercom Communications Corporation, and Executive VP and Treasurer of CBS Radio Inc. In 2009, Ianniello served as CBS's Chief Financial Officer and Executive Vice President of CBS Corporation for four years, where he was responsible for the company's financial strategy across all of its operations. He was named COO of CBS Corporation in 2013.

In 2017, Ianniello signed a contract extension to June 30, 2022, a year longer than Chairman and CEO Les Moonves. This is significant because, according to the New York Post, Ianniello was being poised to succeed Moonves as CEO at some point in the future. That contract extension includes a $70 million payout if his employment were to end by way of a merger.

On September 9, 2018, CBS Corporation announced Moonves would be stepping down as CEO and announced Joe Ianniello as president and acting CEO.

Ianniello's contract for his acting CEO role was extended by the board for six months in April 2019. Under the contract extension, Ianniello's salary rises to $3 million, from $2.5 million. He will receive a $5 million cash signing bonus, and the extension guarantees him another $15 million bonus.

In his role, Ianniello oversaw all CBS-branded assets under parent company ViacomCBS. and strengthened the company's diversity and inclusion efforts.

Joe exited his role on March 23, 2020, being replaced with NBCUniversal alum George Cheeks.

==== CBS-Viacom bid involvement ====
At the time various CBS Board Members put together and submitted a bid to acquire Viacom, CBS had wanted Ianniello – CBS's then chief operating officer – to hold the same position at the new firm.

=== Argus Capitol Corp. ===
On July 22, 2021, Ianniello filed a special purpose acquisition company named Argus Capital Corp. with the purpose of merging or acquiring other private companies in media, sports and entertainment sectors, according to the S-1 filing. Argus Capital Corp. was looking to raise $300,000,000 through the share of 30 million shares at $10 per share.

=== Boards of Directors ===
Ianniello serves on the Board of Trustees at Pace University, the Board of Directors of the charitable organization Food Allergy Research & Education (FARE) as well as New Alternatives for Children. Previously, Ianniello has served as a director of CBS Outdoor Americas, Inc.
