= Nick Jr. =

Nickelodeon preschool programming block

- Logo used since 2023 (Note: The logo's wordmark has been in use since September 28, 2009. Additionally, there is a variant meant to be used for white backgrounds; the main variant has a white (for Nick) and blue (for Jr.) wordmark in conjunction with a fully orange splat.)
- Network: Nickelodeon
- Launched: January 4, 1988; 38 years ago
- Country of origin: United States
- Owner: Nickelodeon Group (Skydance Corporation)
- Headquarters: New York City
- Formerly known as: Nick Junior (1988); Nick Jr. Play Date (2007–09); Nickelodeon's Play Date/Nickelodeon Play Date/Play Date (2009–12); Weekday Mornings on Nick: The Smart Place to Play (2012–14)
- Running time: 7:00 a.m.-2:00 p.m.
- Original languages: English; Spanish (via SAP audio track)
- Official website: nickjr.com

Nick Jr. or Nick, Jr., sometimes disambiguated as Nick Jr. on Nickelodeon or Nick Jr. on Nick, is a morning preschool programming block that airs on Nickelodeon every weekday. Launched on January 4, 1988, Nick Jr. features programming aimed at children aged 2 to 6.

On September 28, 2009, Nickelodeon launched a separate channel named after the Nick Jr. block as a replacement for the Noggin cable channel, which was known occasionally on air as the "Nick Jr. Channel" until 2023 for differentiation purposes.

== History ==
=== Early years (1988–93) ===
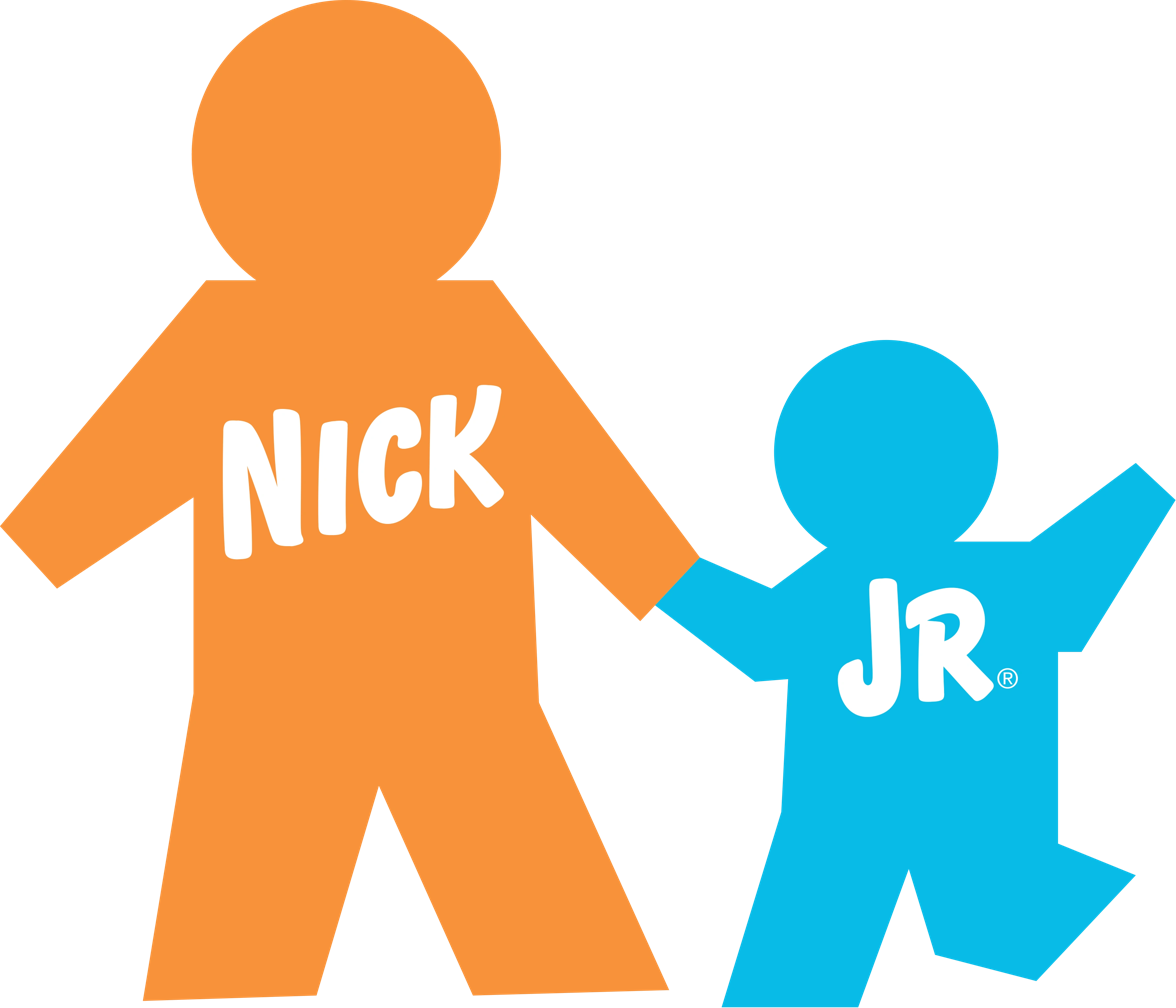
Nick Jr.'s third logo ran from April 5, 1993 to September 12, 2003; concurrently used alongside the 2003 logo from September 15, 2003 to January 30, 2009.

Since its launch on April 1, 1979 and throughout the 1980s, Nickelodeon aired programs for preschoolers (most prominently Pinwheel and Today's Special) on weekdays 8:00 am – 2:00 pm and weekend mornings. After Nickelodeon's preschool block premiered a slew of new shows in 1987, it began using the Nick Junior branding on January 4, 1988, coinciding with the premiere of the Spanish program The World of David the Gnome. A new rebrand for the block that abbreviated its name to Nick Jr. was gradually rolled out from September 5, 1988 to the summer of 1989. Nick Jr.'s new logo was orange for 'Nick' and blue for 'Jr.', and it varied in the shape or species (e.g.: two gears, trains, robots, planets, insects, comets, or elephants). Like with Nickelodeon, Nick Jr.'s network IDs featured the block's logo in different shapes and styles. At launch, the block aired from 8:30 am – 2:30 pm. On weekends, preschool programs aired at earlier hours of the day, and in the case of Eureeka's Castle went unbranded.

Until June 29, 1990, Pinwheel was featured, originally for three hours (two in the morning and one at noon), then for one hour starting in spring 1989. When Nick Jr.'s original series Eureeka's Castle premiered in September, Pinwheel was split into two separate half hours in the morning and afternoon, where it remained until June 29, 1990, after which the block was truncated to run from 9:30 am to 2:30 pm on July 2, 1990, another solidified timing from 9:30 am to 2:00 pm on June 15, 1992, and lastly from 9:00 am to 2:00 pm on October 5. Much of Nick Jr.'s other programs at the time were of Japanese or otherwise foreign origin (including Fred Penner's Place, Sharon, Lois & Bram's Elephant Show, Adventures of the Little Koala, Noozles, Maya the Bee and The Littl' Bits).

=== Grow, Learn, and Play (1993–94) ===
On April 5, 1993, Nick Jr. premiered a new series, Cappelli & Company, and received a new rebrand which prominently featured a new logo consisting of an orange parent and a blue child, and the slogan Grow, Learn, and Play. Several Nick Jr. bumpers featured kids playing near a Nick Jr. logo and a theme song with the slogan sung to the melody of London Bridge, and interstitials were created featuring Cappelli & Company host Frank Cappelli on the set. Nick Jr. also started using a female announcer (who was replaced by a different one) in its promos and bumpers. Nick Jr. began to invest more into producing original interstitial series (including Muppet Time, forty two-minute shorts from The Jim Henson Company) in order to stay within a self-imposed limit of five minutes of commercials per hour.

A year later on April 4, the "Jim Henson's Muppet Hour" sub-block was created by pairing Muppet Babies reruns with the new acquisition The Muppet Show. Due to Nick Jr.'s declining ratings as well as competition from PBS' children's programs and TLC's Ready Set Learn block, Nickelodeon spent $30 million revamping Nick Jr. over the next three years. On June 13, older-skewing Nickelodeon series Rugrats, The Alvin Show, Dennis the Menace, and Lassie joined Nick Jr.'s lineup, as the block's branding was temporarily de-emphasized in favor of Nickelodeon programming.

On October 21, 1994, the Grow, Learn, and Play interstitials ended their 1-year run.

=== Just for Me/Play to Learn (1994–2003) ===
On October 24, 1994, Nick Jr. returned with new on-air branding and premiered two new original series, Gullah Gullah Island and Allegra's Window, resulting in 50% rating gains for the block. Nick Jr. also introduced Face, an animated mascot that introduced shows and interstitials and led into commercial breaks. In the context of his segments, Face was capable of materializing objects such as an astronaut, a robot, a clown, a window, a traffic light, stars, and even wood. He was also capable of creating a number of Foley sound effects and voices including an iconic signature three-note trumpet noise usually following the name "Nick Jr." at the end of almost every bumper. Also, he changed colors, moods, and feelings. Face was voiced by Chris Phillips, who also narrated several Nickelodeon and Nick Jr. promos.

In 1995, Nick Jr. acquired broadcast rights to The Busy World of Richard Scarry from sister network Showtime, and later premiered Rupert on September 11 and Little Bear on November 6 (both were produced by the Canadian animation studio Nelvana).

Nick Jr. received a new rebrand produced by Pittard Sullivan on April 1, 1996. On September 8, the first episode of Blue's Clues premiered in primetime on Nick at Nite, then aired on Nick Jr. the next day. Blue's Clues quickly deposed Gullah Gullah Island as Nick Jr.'s most popular series. Rugrats was pushed out of Nick Jr.'s lineup after May 2, 1997, to make room for second showings of Little Bear and Blue's Clues. The Wubbulous World of Dr. Seuss replaced Papa Beaver's Storytime on October 7, 1997, after a series of occasional airings on the block from October 21, 1996, to February 1997. On March 16, 1998, the "nickjr.com" website was launched. Later that year, Nick Jr. rebranded again and introduced the "Just for Me" slogan. A sign-on and sign-off bumper featuring the "Just for Me" slogan was used on Nick Jr. video releases from 2000–04.

In the first quarter of 1999, Nick Jr. premiered three new series based on books, Franklin on January 11, and Kipper and Maisy in February, which helped increase the block's ratings. Little Bill premiered later in 1999; the series' first episodes premiered on Nickelodeon Sunday nights before airing on Nick Jr. the next day. Nick Jr. briefly aired reruns of Shining Time Station beginning June 5, 2000 (Maggie and the Ferocious Beast premiered on the same day) to promote the film Thomas and the Magic Railroad, before replacing it with Dora the Explorer on August 14, which became one of Nick Jr.'s most successful series.

The US dub of Bob the Builder premiered on Nickelodeon on January 13, 2001, before airing on Nick Jr. two days later; Oswald premiered on August 20. On September 24, 2001, Nick Jr. received a new rebrand produced by AdamsMorioka (who had previously rebranded Nickelodeon and Nick at Nite) and Editional Effects, intended to have a greater appeal towards parents. In the spring of 2002, Nick Jr. altered the format of its commercial breaks, resulting in the removal of older network IDs dating back to 1994. Beginning on January 10, 2003, Dora the Explorer and Blue's Clues were placed in Nick Jr.'s "Play Along Time" sub-block. On April 7, the day that sister network Noggin rebranded and introduced mascots Moose and Zee, Nick Jr. aired some of Noggin's new original series (Oobi, Tweenies, and Miffy and Friends) as a cross-promotion; British program Rubbadubbers premiered on September 2. Nick Jr. continued to air Tweenies from July to September 25.

On September 12, 2003, the original Face interstitials ended their almost 9-year run.

=== Play Along (2003–04) ===
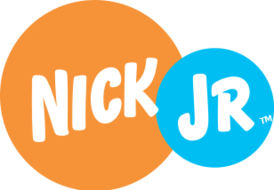
Nick Jr.'s fourth logo ran from September 15, 2003 to January 30, 2009.

On September 15, 2003, Nick Jr. received a rebrand that introduced more than a dozen new logos. A new interstitial series called Nick Jr. Play Along was introduced, hosted by two live-action hosts: Robin (played by actress Hillary Hawkins) and Zack (played by actor Travis Guba). Along with Robin and Zack were two sock puppets called the Feetbeats. Face was given a brand new look which added eyebrows and a chin and straightened his eyes by inverting their colors from white dots on black eyes to actual-looking eyes, and was voiced by Nick on CBS announcer Babi Floyd. The new Face promos were produced by Virtual Persuasion. On the same day, Nick Jr. also began to use split-screen credits for most shows, while Dora the Explorer and Blue's Clues would still play normal end credits. These two shows were later excluded from this format of credits since three years later on December 11. Starting the following year in September, Nick Jr. used a new on-screen bug to promote its website until two years later on February 28.

On October 8, 2004, the new Face interstitials ended their 1-year run alongside most of Nick Jr.'s older interstitial series.

=== Love to Play! (2004–07) ===
On October 11, 2004, Nick Jr. received another rebrand containing interstitials co-produced with Little Airplane Productions featuring the block's new mascot Piper O'Possum (voiced by Ali Brustofski and created by Josh Selig), and the new slogan "Love to Play!". Nick Jr.'s female announcer was replaced with Kobie Powell and Chris Phillips. LazyTown, Miss Spider's Sunny Patch Friends, Blue's Room, and The Backyardigans (the latter of which premiering alongside the rebrand) premiered on Nick Jr. Nick Jr.'s commercial limit increased to 8 minutes per hour, and the block began airing more interstitials that were clips from its shows. Dora the Explorer spin-off Go, Diego, Go! premiered, whilst Wonder Pets! and Wow! Wow! Wubbzy! debuted the following year. Yo Gabba Gabba! debuted the following year, and was the only Nick Jr. series to premiere that year.

On September 7, 2007, the Piper O'Possum interstitials ended their almost three-year run.

=== Play Date (2007–09) ===
On September 10, 2007, Nick Jr. received another rebrand nicknamed Nick Jr. Play Date. A new slogan, Play with Us!, was also included. The bumpers encouraged preschoolers to play along and featured the Nick Jr. logo in the form of two stop-motion plushies. This marked the first time that Nick Jr. had no mascot since thirteen years. Five months later on February 18, the March 2006 on-screen bugs were replaced with three new bugs reflecting the branding. Nick Jr. began its broadcast at 8:30 am starting the following week.

On January 30, 2009, the Play Date interstitials ended their 16-month run.

=== Nickelodeon rebranding (2009–14) ===
Nick Jr.'s fifth logo ran from September 28, 2009 to May 18, 2018.

On February 2, 2009, the Nick Jr. block rebranded as Nickelodeon Play Date, as part of an effort to unite the Nickelodeon channel's programs under a single brand. The block's commercial limit increased again to 10 minutes per hour. NickJr.com continued to use the Nick Jr. brand name to categorize all of Nickelodeon's preschool programming. The block initially retained the previous branding, alongside new branding (which was based on Noggin’s branding) designed by Melinda Beck, and many bumpers featured drawings, finger puppets or cupcakes. The bumpers' music was a choir of kids vocalizing, and Nicolette Pierini was the announcer of each bumper. The Nickelodeon splat logo was edited onto the block's split-screen credits design and interstitials predating the previous branding (although a few interstitials at the time retained the Nick Jr. name). Starting on June 15 of that year, the split-screen credits were replaced to match the new branding, officially retiring the previous branding. On September 28 of that year, the Nick Jr. channel was launched, replacing Noggin.

In 2011, Nickelodeon Play Date received a new rebrand featuring characters from the block's shows. That same year, Nickelodeon Play Date stopped using the branding’s split-screen credits and started using Nickelodeon's split-screen credits design. The following year, the Play Date branding was replaced with a modified version of the Nick Jr. channel's new branding known as Nick: The Smart Place to Play, and the block stopped airing most interstitials. Despite Nickelodeon displaying its shows' credits during the last 30 seconds before it, the branding retained the split-screen credits for Nick Jr. shows airing on the block until May 2, 2014.

=== Return of Nick Jr. branding (2014–23) ===
Nick Jr.'s sixth logo ran from May 21, 2018 to July 1, 2023; in which the logo is in slightly darker color.

On May 5, 2014, The Smart Place to Play name was later replaced with the regular Nick Jr. name and began calling itself "Nick Jr. on Nickelodeon" or "Nick Jr. on Nick" while still using a Nickelodeon screen bug. When aired on the Nick Jr. channel, commercials for programs broadcast on Nickelodeon's Nick Jr. block usually end with "Over on Nick" or "Over on Nickelodeon" to differentiate the titles. On the same day, the block also began to use Nickelodeon's on-screen credits to include more commercials (now 12 minutes per hour). The following year on June 10, the Nick Jr. website was fully redesigned to match up with the Nick Jr. app.

=== Return of Nickelodeon branding (2023–present) ===
Alternate logo with slightly different text placing concurrently used alongside the 2023 logo since July 5, 2023

On July 5, 2023, the Nick Jr. block was rebranded to include a refreshed splat logo and used a Nickelodeon name in the refreshed bumpers, as well as refreshed curriculum boards, while the Nick Jr. channel eventually adopted the full rebrand on September 4.

== Programming ==
=== Other Nick Jr. blocks for broadcast networks ===
Nick Jr. programs and interstitial segments appeared as a Saturday morning block on CBS entitled Nick Jr. on CBS. It was part of the general Nick on CBS block, which also included programming from the main Nickelodeon channel until 2 years later on September 18, when it switched back to its previous format. It ended after Viacom and CBS Corporation were separated (but re-merged in later years) and was replaced by the KOL Secret Slumber Party block.

Spanish-language US network Telemundo has aired Spanish-dubbed versions of both Blue's Clues (Pistas De Blue) and Dora the Explorer (Dora la Exploradora) as part of the network's Nickelodeon en Telemundo block. Dora la Exploradora would return to the network through its Telemundo Kids block on October 2, 2004, but was eventually pulled off the lineup once more on September 3, 2006, with Telemundo Kids being replaced by a Spanish version of Ion Media's Qubo block (which launched on the same day as Nick Jr. on CBS's shutdown) the following week.

Dora la Exploradora would later return to Spanish-language broadcast television through competing Spanish network Univision with the launch of its Saturday morning Planeta U line-up on April 5, 2008, joined by Spanish-dubbed versions of its spin-off Go, Diego, Go! and Pinky Dinky Doo from Nickelodeon's sister network Noggin. Unlike Telemundo, Univision added on-screen captions of the Spanish words spoken in English during its broadcasts of Dora la Exploradora. A Spanish-dubbed version of The Backyardigans was later added to the lineup on June 25, 2011.

Tr3s, another sister network to Nickelodeon, aired a daily block of Spanish-dubbed Nick Jr. programs under the name Tr3s Jr. to meet E/I requirements for its broadcast affiliates. Shows like Pistas de Blue and Las mascotas maravilla (the Spanish version of Wonder Pets!) were featured in the block.

=== Face's reappearances ===
The 90s Face made an appearance during the New Year edition of The '90s Are All That, TeenNick's former retro-oriented late-night block. Face's appearances consisted of out-of-context clips that make him appear to be drunk or making adult comments (e.g.: "Yeah, grow a pair!").

For the Halloween/Nick or Treat season, the "Face the Monster" bumper would play on the block as a transition of introducing episodes of Aaahh!!! Real Monsters on The Splat. The same bumper would be used on the block as an April Fools' Day prank two years later on April 1.

Face also appeared in an Easter promo for The Splat, encouraging viewers to look for the Easter bunny in 90s Nickelodeon shows.

A re-designed Face voiced by Cedric Williams hosted the Nick Jr. show Face's Music Party. Face's original voice actor Chris Phillips continued to narrate promos for Nick Jr.

== See also ==
- Dance and Sing! The Best of Nick Jr.
- Nick Jr. Channel
- Nickelodeon
