= Horseland (TV series) =

American animated television series

- Genre: Animated series Adventure
- Created by: Andy Heyward
- Developed by: Phil Harnage
- Directed by: Karen Hydendahl
- Starring: Dana Donlan; Emily Hernandez; Bianca Heyward; Marissa Maliani; Caroline Iliff; David Kalis; Gerald Longe; Stephen Michael Shelton; Laura Marr; Vincent Michael; Marissa Shea; Aleyah Smith; Andrea Ware; Michelle Zacharia; Rachel Ware
- Theme music composer: Ron Wasserman
- Opening theme: "Let's Go to Horseland" performed by Slumber Party Girls
- Ending theme: "Let's Go to Horseland" (instrumental)
- Composer: Ron Wasserman
- Country of origin: United States
- Original language: English
- No. of seasons: 3
- No. of episodes: 39

Production
- Executive producers: Andy Heyward; Michael Maliani
- Producer: Kaaren Lee Brown (S1–2)
- Editors: Jo Martin (S1); James Hereth; Judith Reily (S2–3)
- Running time: 23 minutes
- Production companies: Horseland, LLC; KOL/AOL for Kids (S1–2); DIC Entertainment (Note: Animation outsourced to Suzhou Hong Yang Cartoon Company Limited.); Melusine Productions

Original release
- Network: CBS
- Release: September 16, 2006 – December 6, 2008

Horseland is an American animated series produced by DIC Entertainment. It follows the events in the lives of a group of children at Horseland, an equestrian school and stables. Their adventures include riding their horses and entering them in competitions to test their skill and friendships. The show premiered on September 16, 2006, as part of CBS's new Saturday morning cartoon block, KOL Secret Slumber Party on CBS, later KEWLopolis (now Cookie Jar TV). Concurrent with the series, the online virtual pet game that it was based upon was updated to complement the show by launching a new "Junior version" of the game based on the program and featuring its various characters and locations. After three seasons and 39 episodes, the show was cancelled on CBS and aired its final episode on December 6, 2008. Reruns of Horseland subsequently aired nationwide on the digital subchannel This TV; two episodes aired each weekend until September 2010. Horseland last aired as part of Cookie Jar TV on CBS. The series has seven related books which are available to be purchased online.

This show, along with Sushi Pack and DinoSquad, were the final three series produced by DIC before their acquisition with Cookie Jar Entertainment, who produced the third and final season of Horseland until the series ended its run in 2008. Cookie Jar (along with most of the DiC library) would be acquired by DHX Media (now known as WildBrain) in 2012.

== Premise ==
Set on the fictional ranch of Horseland Stables, the series follows the adventures of six pre-teens (Sarah, Alma, Molly, Bailey, Chloe, Zoey, Will, and Nani in Season 3) and their horses, who each deal with their own life situations. Almost every episode is narrated in flashback by Shep the Rough Collie alongside his fellow animal friends Angora, and Teeny. He gives the episode's featured lesson to Teeny the pig and Angora the cat in the opening and ending scenes.

== Characters ==
The characters of Horseland are usually limited to the group of kids who are frequently at the stable, but some episodes (especially those which involve travelling), introduce one-time characters and horses as a plot device.

=== Sarah Whitney and Scarlet ===
Sarah Whitney is the 12-year-old English-American central character of the series who likes to make friends. She is very friendly and loves to encourage others to do their best and have fun. She comes from a rich family but does not consider herself better than others because of it. She stays more loyal to Molly, Alma, and Bailey, and later Nani when she joins in Season 3. Sarah has wavy blonde hair with bleached highlights and baby-blue eyes. She also has silver hoop earrings with piercings in her ears. Sarah wears a red riding jacket with a matching red necktie and white pants. She has been seen at younger ages and in different hairstyles in flashbacks. She is voiced by Dana Donlan.

Sarah's horse is Scarlet, a purebred black Shagya Arabian mare who has a black mane and tail with red highlights. She sometimes carries her tail higher than the other horses, a common trait of Arabian horses. Scarlet is fearless, level-headed, wise, and regal. She is completely loyal to her owner. She is patient and loving, much like her owner, and is great with kids. Her symbol is a red crown, representing royalty. She is voiced by Andrea Ware.

=== Molly Washington and Calypso ===
Molly Washington is a 12-year-old African-American girl who often deals with life's issues through humor. She is entertaining, creative, appealing, and enjoys self-deprecating humor. She at times applies similar humorous criticisms to her friends, which tends to annoy them, but Molly can become serious and ride a horse just as well as the others when her friends are depending on her. She is good at Western riding with Calypso and is the only one to consistently wear her hair in a ponytail. Molly wears a pink riding jumper and white pants. Her father is a dentist. She has a younger sister named Lissa, who also expresses an interest in horses. She is voiced by Aleyah Smith.

Molly's horse is Calypso, a brown/silver/bay spotted blanket Appaloosa mare with a creamy white mane and tail with pink highlights, who is warm-hearted, laid back, and affectionate. When she learns something once, she has learned it for life. She likes her friends and rider dearly, and is best friends with Button, who always jumps to Calypso's defense. She speaks with a Caribbean accent. Her symbol is a pink heart, representing love. She is voiced by Emily Hernandez.

=== Alma Rodriguez and Button ===
Alma Rodriguez is a 12-year-old girl who comes from a tight-knit Mexican-American family, and is the best jumper at Horseland. While living in Mexico, her grandfather gave her a medallion of St. Martin of Tours. Later, Alma and her family moved to the United States. Alma's father is the manager at Horseland. He taught her how to ride when she was younger. Alma wears a white jumper with light green vest and khaki pants, and is a bibliophile. Alma is also constantly using the knowledge she learns from the Internet. She is voiced by Emily Hernandez.

Alma's horse is Button, a black and white tobiano trakehner mare with green highlights in her wavy white mane and tail. Her owner is Alma, whom she has been with for 10 years, coming from Mexico to Horseland when Alma and her family moved. She has a Mexican accent. She likes to please Alma and does not work very hard to do so. She is fully focused and talented, especially at jumping, and has earned the title of "The best jumper at Horseland". When she has to do something important, Button is extremely focused and patient and is ready to do whatever it takes to get it done, including going over show acts in the pouring rain, or constantly going over jump after jump, and she is best friends with Calypso. Her symbol is a clover, representing luck. She is voiced by Laura Marr and Tiffany White-Welchen in some episodes.

=== Bailey Handler and Aztec ===
Bailey Handler is the 13-year-old son of the Horseland owners. He often takes risks and bets not considering the consequences of his actions, and enjoys joking around and having a good time. He loves horses and animals, and insists that they be treated with kindness and gentleness. Bailey has a dark brown mullet and dark blue eyes, and is considered the local heartthrob at the stables, much to his own embarrassment. Bailey wears dark blue long sleeved shirt with the sleeves rolled up and light blue pants. He sometimes wears a cowboy hat. He is voiced by David Kalis.

Bailey's horse is Aztec, a light brown-bay Kiger mustang stallion with a dark brown mane and tail with dark blue highlights and a white muzzle. He frequently acts irritable and nonchalant, but he honestly cares about his friends and other animals. He is often protective of his mare friends, much to their irritation, and has shown great courage, determination, and leadership skills. His symbol is a dark blue lightning bolt, representing strength. He is voiced by Ben Birkholtz.

=== Chloe Stilton and Chili ===
Chloe is the 12-year-old older twin sister of Zoey and one of the two anti-heroes of the series, who is a confident, skilled young girl who likes to let other people know of her talents. She comes from an affluent family and can often be conceited, self-centered, and depthless, but like her sister, Chloe can also be very friendly and polite with the other girls. She has an unrequited crush on Bailey, and would go to great lengths to impress him. She is especially fond of fashion and makeup, and loves to look great when she rides. Though Chloe is competitive with her sister, Zoey, they still support each other when it is important. Chloe has strawberry blonde hair and light green eyes. She wears a lavender jumper, a lavender headband and purple pants. She is voiced by Bianca Heyward (season 1–2) and Caroline Iliff (in "Win Some, Lose Some", and in some episodes of season 2 and in season 3).

Chloe's horse is Chili, a light grey Dutch Warmblood stallion with lavender highlights in his white mane and tail and a dark gray blaze on his muzzle. Chili shares Chloe's confidence to the point that he feels he is the most talented horse at Horseland, though he often feels upstaged and unappreciated by his showy rider. He and Aztec disagree with each other frequently. Both Chili and his rider are talented in dressage. His symbol is a lavender diamond, representing discipline. He is voiced by Stephen Michael Shelton.

=== Zoey Stilton and Pepper ===
Zoey is the 12-year-old younger twin sister of Chloe and the second anti-hero of the series, who takes a more devious approach with her competitiveness and is into fashion and makeup like Chloe. She is talented in cross country, and is also captain of Horseland's cross-country team. Zoey also likes to show off and can be flirtatious with the boys that she meets. She is competitive with her sister Chloe, but they still support each other. Depending on the circumstances, Zoey can appear shallow and rude, or thoughtful and nice. Zoey has wavy red hair, freckles and green eyes. She wears a light blue short-sleeved top and two-tone khaki pants. She is voiced by Marissa Maliani.

Zoey's horse is Pepper, a snobby steel-gray purebred Dutch Warmblood mare with light blue highlights in her slate grey wavy mane and tail, and a white muzzle. Pepper is quick-tempered and irritable, donning a large ego and confidence to match. While she likes her rider and is good friends with Chili, she often clashes with the other horses. Like Zoey, Pepper is cynical, spirited, and likes to compete. Her symbol is a light blue crescent moon, representing grace. She is voiced by Tifanie Christun.

=== Will Taggert and Jimber ===
Will is a 15-years-old boy who is often put in charge of the ranch while Bailey's parents are away. He is Bailey's cousin and has lived with Bailey's family ever since he was younger. Mature and insightful, he often acts as an adult figure to the rest of the kids and also serves as their riding instructor and mentor. He loves to listen to country music and is great at horse riding, whether it be Western and English. He has blonde hair and greyish-blue eyes. He wears a black short-sleeved shirt with a horseshoe pendant around his neck, and dark blue pants. Will has dyslexia, just like Sarah's cousin Chase, which leads to a close relationship between the characters. He always helps her when she is down and defends her when she is hurt. He is voiced by Vincent Michael (season 1 and 2) and Ian Eli Lee (season 3).

Will's horse is Jimber, a palomino Quarter Horse stallion with black highlights in his off-white mane and a white front foot. Similar to Will, he has a commanding presence among the others, and worked as a ranch horse before coming to Horseland. He is a bit older in years in comparison to the other horses, and is dependable and wise. Jimber speaks with a Southern accent. His symbol is a black star, representing loyalty. He is voiced by D. Kevin Williams.

=== Nani Cloud and Sunburst ===
Nani is a 12-year-old Native American girl who debuts at the start of season 3. She is proud of her Cherokee ethnic heritage and loves nature and horses. Nani has blue-black hair with braided tendrils and hazel eyes, and wears a light blue long-sleeved Cherokee jacket with light yellow accents, and blue jeans. She is quick to defend herself and accidentally stirs up a rivalry between herself and Zoey for the position of leadership for the cross-country team at Horseland. Nani is calm, friendly, intelligent, and good with animals. She is voiced by Rachel Ware.

Nani's horse is Sunburst, a generally calm and polite yellow palomino Paint stallion with a white mane with gold highlights. He cannot stand to wear saddles and prefers to be ridden bareback, though he gets used to saddles within one episode, as it is clear that the writers forgot about this plot point. Like his owner, he at first starts on bad terms with Pepper, but the two eventually become friends, and he later begins to show great concern for her well-being. Unlike many of the other horses, he rarely lets mean words affect him. He has a single braid under his mane. His symbol is a yellow sun with blue lights, representing dignity. He is voiced by Cork Ramer.

=== Shep ===
Shep is a wise male rough collie, who acts as the leader of the animals at Horseland, and is the narrator of the series. He is a very loyal ranch dog and always helps the horses in times of trouble. Shep often serves as the voice of reason for Teeny and Angora, and, to illustrate a moral or lesson, frequently relates stories to them based on the episode's plot. He is friendly, perceptive, and protective of both the horses and the riders at Horseland. His owners are Will and Bailey. Shep has been with him since he was a pup. Shep would frequently break the fourth wall, addressing the audience about the episode's lesson. He is voiced by Jerry Longe.

=== Teeny ===
Teeny is a young chubby black-and-white female pot-bellied pig who wears a pink ribbon on her tail. She shows an innocent, naive personality, and often becomes anxious over relatively small situations. She is well-intentioned, though simple-minded, and Shep usually acts as a friend and mentor to Teeny, in contrast to Angora, who frequently teases her. Although Teeny rarely understands situations, she is a compassionate young piglet who gets very worried about others when there is trouble. She is voiced by Michelle Zacharia.

=== Angora ===
Angora is a gray, long-haired Turkish Angora with bangs that sweep over her eyes, white chest tuft, green eyes and a pink collar. She is often dismissive of other animals, and feels that she deserves better treatment than anyone else, due to her self-absorbed and arrogant nature, but there are many episodes that showcase her character development. Angora's favorite people are Chloe and Zoey because they're so much like her. A running gag in the series involves her love of trouble (and hatred of peace) at Horseland, but she shows authentic concern whenever Shep and Teeny are in true danger. She is voiced by Marissa Shea.

=== Cubby ===
Cubby is a brown Pomeranian puppy. He was found abandoned by Bailey in "New Pup in Town" and was subsequently adopted. He is cute and well-meaning, much like Teeny. Alma becomes jealous because she wants a dog, but because her father is the foreman at Horseland, she is not allowed to have one. Shep is initially jealous of Cubby. When Cubby runs away, Alma and Shep put their jealous feelings aside and help Bailey bring him home. Alma takes Bailey up on his offer to share Cubby with him. Shep and Cubby eventually become friends. Cubby is only seen in 2-3 episodes.

== Secondary characters ==
=== Simbala and Ranak ===
Simbala is an Indian girl who meets the Horseland gang on a trip to France in the episode "International Sarah". She is thoughtful, sweet-natured, and is proud of her culture, choosing to wear traditional dress and a bindi. Her father knows Sarah's father, and the two girls became friends after falling into a cave. She loves riding, fresh fruit, and dental floss.

Simbala's horse is Ranak, a black stallion with a blaze. He hates plane rides, but enjoys sugar cubes and being alone. After initially irritating the other horses with his worried whinnying, he apologizes and becomes friendly to them. He also has an accent and his color is dark blue.

=== Jesse Golden and Buddy ===
Jesse is a boy who visits Horseland while his parents' farm, Golden Corral Ranch, is being remodeled. He appears in the episode "Bailey's New Friend", in which he unintentionally causes Sarah to feel like Bailey does not like her anymore. Like Bailey, he enjoys video games, taking care of his horse, talking, and being a bit of a daredevil. Both Molly and Alma mention that he is a "cutie", and Chloe and Zoey express that they think he is "hot"; Chloe also describes him as a "total babe".

Jesse's horse is Buddy, a large chocolate palomino stallion. He is brave, headstrong, and misses his home while away. He has teal stripes in his mane and tail. He is skittish at first but eventually gets used to the place.

=== Alexander Buglick and Bucephalus ===
Alexander is Alma's pen pal, seen in the episode "First Love". While his letters to her made him seem like a wealthy champion rider, an intentional facade meant to impress her, he really only rides for fun, and is rather timid. His parents are the proprietors of a traveling circus, but he admires Alma and her incredible riding abilities, and shares her love of reading. He likes to compare himself with the great Macedonian general, Alexander the Great.

His horse is a kind, humble stallion named Bucephalus, in honor of Alexander the Great's famous steed. He performs in the circus and enjoys his life, despite its lack of glamour. His color is maroon.

=== Mary Whitney and Prince ===
Mary is Sarah and Chase's cousin, an entertaining, independent girl who never lets the fact that she is blind get in the way of her positive attitude and self-sufficiency. Mary appears in the episode "A True Gift". She has a clever return for most insults that Zoey throws at her, and understandably hates it when her friends are patronizing toward her, though she is also polite about it. She loves horses, riding, and the outdoors.

Mary's horse is Prince, a white Thoroughbred stallion who is said to be the fastest horse ever to come to Horseland, a 'fact' that causes Scarlet to get jealous and worry that she will be replaced. Sarah temporarily rode him in Scarlet's place in order to make sure that he was a good enough horse for Mary. He has a white wavy mane and tail with light blue highlights. Prince does not talk to any of the horses in the episode, so his personality is unknown.

=== Talia Bentley and Kisses ===
Talia is a talented but mean-spirited girl who is both confident and competitive. She appears in the episode "Changing Spots" and is the premier show jumper at Stanhope Academy, Horseland's biggest rival. She is Alma's nemesis, and the two show specific animosity towards each other after they get in a fight about who deserves to win an upcoming competition.

Talia's horse is Kisses, described as a beautiful Camarillo White Horse mare. She has a white mane with light pink highlights, and blue eyes. The show depicts her as an excellent show jumper and performer. Kisses' personality remains unknown as she does not have a speaking role.

=== Chase Whitney and Wonder ===
Chase is Sarah and Mary's cousin, first appearing as he visits during "The Secret". Chase is portrayed with dyslexia, and is embarrassed by his condition. Throughout the episode he tries to hide his difficulties with reading from the others. Despite this, he is still very friendly and enjoys making people laugh. Chase has light brown hair and blue eyes.

His horse Wonder is a dark bay Anglo-Arabian stallion with green stripes. Wonder does not talk to any of the horses in the episode, so his personality is unknown.

== Other characters ==
=== Jasmin and Amber ===
Jasmin and Amber are two of Molly's close friends from the city. Both of the girls are confident, loud, and playful, and enjoy having a good time all the time. Neither of them go to Horseland, but do express an interest in horseback riding. Despite frequently teasing Molly, the two are genuinely supportive of her interests. Amber is African-American, and has dark brown eyes and long wavy hair. Jasmine is of an Asian ethnicity and has light hazel eyes and black hair.

=== Linnea, Alexia and Windy ===
Linnea is a princess that visits Horseland in disguise, pretending to be the princess' assistant, while Alexia, her maid, pretends to be the princess. Both have light blonde hair, blue eyes, and favor the color light pink, although Alexia is much shorter than her companion. Linnea becomes close friends with Sarah.

Linnea's horse is Windy, a mare who looks like Talia's Kisses and wears an ornate bridle. She also has a volumous wavy mane and tail. She does not understand English and only speaks Icelandic, and fails to respond to any of the other horses' attempts to speak to her, causing them to think she was rude.

=== Diablo ===
Diablo is a red Welsh stallion with an injured back leg who belongs to a girl named Madison. He initially has aggressive and rude behavior and was brought to Horseland so that Sarah could use her "way with horses" to try to help him recover. His only appearance is "The Horse Whisperer". His name means "devil" in Spanish. He also has a wavy mane and tail. He is voiced by D. Kevin Williams.

=== Puma ===
Puma is a buckskin splashed white mustang stallion staying at Horseland to be tamed by Will. His mane and tail are black with white stripes. His only appearance is in the episode "Wild Horses". He tells Aztec about what it is like living in the wild, which prompts Aztec to run away, but Puma liked the wonderful treatment he was given at Horseland. It is mentioned that he likes oats, which is shown in the same episode.

=== Wild Horses ===
These horses are met by Aztec when he runs away from Horseland. The two identified by name are Chaco, a black mustang stallion who does not want Aztec on their territory, and Mesa, a cream colt that befriends Aztec. Other horses in the herd are a pair of bays, Mesa's cream mother, and a brown paint female. They all have plain manes and tails.

=== River ===
River is a well-known racehorse stallion that comes to Horseland to recuperate from a leg injury. He is steel grey with a white mane and tail, and has desaturated blue highlights. His only appearance is "A Horse Named River", during which it is revealed that he has become a polite, but elderly and unenthusiastic horse, nothing like the speedy youthful stallion Chili who has been a fan of his whole life. He was younger and belonged to an unnamed girl in flashbacks. He is voiced by Peter Elliott.

=== Cream and Sugar ===
Cream is a white colt that has light pink highlights, while Sugar is a pale filly that has light blue stripes. They are fraternal twins, and only appear in the episode "Oh, Baby". They visit Horseland when their mother was sick and could not take care of them. They are voiced by Eugene Jaramillo and Grace Bydalek.

== Additional voices ==
- Dana Donlan as Sarah Whitney
- Emily Hernandez as Alma Rodriguez and Calypso
- Bianca Heyward as Chloe Stilton (seasons 1 and 2)
- Caroline Iliff as Chloe Stilton in "Win Some, Lose Some", the last two episodes of season 2 and season 3
- Marissa Shea as Angora
- Marissa Maliani as Zoey Stilton
- David Kalis as Bailey Handler
- Jerry Longe as Shep
- Laura Marr as Button
- Vincent Michael as Will Taggert (seasons 1 and 2)
- Ian Eli Lee as Will Taggert (season 3)
- Aleyah Smith as Molly Washington
- Michelle Zacharia as Teeney
- Joe Dinghman
- Ben Birkholtz as Aztec
- Courtney Britt
- Tifanie Christun as Pepper
- Stephen Shelton
- Andrea Ware as Scarlet
- Kelcey Watson as Bucephalus
- Tiffany White-Welchen as Calypso
- D. Kevin Williams as Jimber
- Rachel Ware as Nani Cloud
- Brice Altman
- Benjamin Beck as Chili
- Susan B. Collins
- Nils Haaland
- Moral Masuoka
- Cork Ramer as Sunburst
- Samantha Triba
- Prenisha Barfield
- Miranda Christine
- Cody Fox
- R.C. Cash
- John Michael Lee
- Roz Parr
- Ryle Smith
- Mary Waltman

== Episodes ==
Season	Episodes	Originally released	
Season	Episodes	First released	Last released
1	13	September 16, 2006	December 9, 2006
2	13	September 15, 2007	December 8, 2007
3	13	September 13, 2008	December 6, 2008

=== Season 1 (2006) ===
No. overall	No. in season	Title	Written by	Original release date	Prod. code
1	1	"You Can't Judge a Girl By Her Limo"	Phil Harnage; Carter Crocker	September 16, 2006	101
The kids reminisce back to when Sarah first arrived at Horseland. The Stiltons are eager to make friends with a fellow wealthy girl, while the others assume she's going to be another rich, mean snob like Chloe and Zoey. Sarah, however, turns out to be truly kind and selfless, and the others have to realize they had jumped to unfair conclusions about her character.
2	2	"Win Some, Lose Some"	Martha Moran	September 23, 2006	102
Alma gets cocky over the fact that she is the best jumper at Horseland and thinks she is too good to practice for an upcoming competition. When the course is changed at the last minute, Alma finds herself radically unprepared for the challenges ahead of her, and this competition turns out to be one of the most difficult ones the riders have had to face yet.: Note: Molly, Will, Bailey, Calypso, Jimber, and Aztec are absent from this episode and Caroline Iliff voices Chloe in this episode.
3	3	"Back in the Saddle Again"	John Loy	September 30, 2006	103
During jumping practice one day, Molly is thrown off Calypso and becomes too scared to ride her anymore. As the days go by, Molly shows up to the lessons but is too overcome by her fear to even get on her horse, despite wanting nothing more than to ride her. When Scarlet is struck with a serious case of colic, Molly must learn to get over her fear in order to ride to the vet and retrieve the help Scarlet desperately needs.
4	4	"Cry Wolf"	Michael Edens	October 7, 2006	104
Fed up with Chloe shirking her responsibility of cleaning out Chili's stall, Alma decides to trick her by saying a bracelet Chloe had lost was in the stall and that she would have to clean it in order to find it. Later, on a hike, Alma spies a wolf, but nobody believes her because of the way she lied to Chloe earlier. Alma returns to the spot she last saw the wolf to get proof, but Button gets spooked and runs away, leaving Alma stranded to fend off the wolf by herself.
5	5	"Fire, Fire, Burning Bright"	Eric Lewald; Julia Lewald	October 14, 2006	105
Everyone except Bailey goes on a trail ride, and Chloe and Zoey are assigned the job of putting out the camp fire, but they don't do a good enough job and accidentally cause a forest fire, putting Will's leadership skills to the test.
6	6	"Fast Friends"	Michael Edens	October 21, 2006	106
Sarah, Alma, Molly, and Zoey are assigned to doing musical kur for an upcoming competition, but Calypso struggles with learning the routine. Worried that Molly and her horse will mess up during the competition and embarrass her and Pepper, Zoey tries to get Molly to drop out by convincing her that Sarah and Alma want to drop her from the routine anyway. Molly however takes it as a sign that nobody wants her around Horseland anymore and plans to leave the ranch forever.
7	7	"Pepper's Pain"	Rhonda Smiley	October 28, 2006	107
After Pepper is accidentally injured during a competition, Zoey turns her back on her, fearful that Pepper will be put down and unwilling to deal with the pain that would come from that. Pepper becomes depressed and unmotivated to get better and ride again when Zoey stops coming by to see her, which only adds to Zoey's fears about losing her. It is up to the rest of the Horseland gang to reunite both Zoey and Pepper before the two give up on each other, and their lives at Horseland, for good.
8	8	"The Awful Truth"	Greg Perkins	November 4, 2006	108
Chloe lies to everyone about jumping over a parallel oxer so she can impress Bailey. Her fib succeeds in impressing him, but it soon escalates to the point where reporters come to Horseland for a meet to watch her make the jump, since it is rare that such a young rider can perform it. Chloe decides to practice the jump the night before the competition, but Chili sprains his leg during the process. The next day at the meet, Chloe must either come clean with her lie, or attempt another jump and endanger the lives of both her and Chili.
9	9	"The Competition"	Jay Abramowitz	November 11, 2006	109
The Junior Nationals are coming up and the theme of the competition is western riding. Horseland must pick one rider to represent them, and the gang begins to compete to see which one of them will go to the nationals. Soon, however, they learn a famous music star will be a judge at the competition, and they let the chance to win and meet their favorite singer take priority over their friendship. What started out as a fun opportunity to compete may end up costing them their friendship.
10	10	"The Can-Do Kid"	Martha Moran	November 18, 2006	110
The girls are given the task of learning lateral dressage and Sarah especially is determined to learn it. Rather than take it slow, she pushes Scarlet and herself to too hard and ends up spraining Scarlet's leg during practice. Convinced that Scarlet is unable to learn it and unwilling to accidentally hurt her again, Sarah decides to give up her determination, but when she and her friends are stranded in the middle of a river during a fierce thunderstorm, Sarah realizes that her determination may be the only thing that can save them.
11	11	"The Best Loss"	Corey Powell	November 25, 2006	111
Molly invites her friends from the city to watch her perform at an upcoming competition and to meet her friends at Horseland, but she is afraid that they won't like each other due to the fact her city friends are all about goofing off and having fun while her friends at Horseland are dedicated and serious about work. When her city friends become lost on their way to the competition, Molly drops out of the competition in order to find them, with the help of her friends at Horseland.
12	12	"Boss Bailey"	Karl Geurs	December 2, 2006	112
Will leaves for one day to help Bailey's folks for the parade, leaving Bailey in charge. The power ends up going to Bailey's head, and his desire to do well in their performance drives him to act harshly to the others and bark orders at them like a dictator. When a storm hits, Alma continues to practice when the others head inside so she won't upset Bailey. The storm spooks Button and causes her to run off with Alma in tow. It is up to Bailey and Sarah to now work together and go find her before it's too late.
13	13	"A True Gift"	Sharon Schatz Rosenthal	December 9, 2006	113
Sarah's blind cousin, Mary, comes to Horseland for a visit. Sarah is busy training a new horse, so she lets Mary take care of and ride Scarlet while she is visiting. Bailey, Molly, and Alma are concerned with leaving her by herself, but so they constantly follow her around offering to do everything for her. When the four of them get lost on a new trail at night, they soon begin to realize that Mary is not as helpless as they think she is.

=== Season 2 (2007) ===
No. overall	No. in season	Title	Written by	Original release date	Prod. code
14	1	"First Love"	Jim Peronto	September 15, 2007	201
When Alma discovers that her pen pal and love, Alexander, is going to visit Horseland, she's worried that she won't be good enough for him. Chloe and Zoey attempt to help her impress him, but their plan backfires. Then Alexander and his horse fall down a steep ravine, which Alma saves him from, and she finds out that she was good enough for him.
15	2	"Bailey's New Friend"	Kevin O'Donnell	September 22, 2007	202
When a new boy, Jesse, comes for an extended visit to Horseland, Bailey is overjoyed to have a boy his own age to hang out with. When he starts neglecting his friendship with Sarah, Molly and Alma, though, tension grows. Chloe and Zoey, always jealous of his relationship with the other girls, go out of their way to ensure that much of his time is spent with Jesse. When Horseland is chartered for the birthday party of the annoying Ethan Simon, though, the friends must get back together to organize the party.
16	3	"Molly and Chili"	Eric Lewald; Julia Lewald	September 29, 2007	203
The Horseland gang is excited to go on the Twilight Trek, an annual outdoor campout during the course of which horses and riders are expected to bond. Calypso has a hot spot, however, that prevents her from being ridden. Chloe, who is also unable to go due to a cold, offers to let Molly ride Chili instead. The two initially don't get along, but become friends after a close encounter with a bear.
17	4	"Wild Horses"	John Loy	October 6, 2007	204
A once-wild horse named Puma comes to Horseland, and talks of his life in the wild. This makes Aztec also want to run away and be free. He manages to sneaks away, but comes to find out that life away from civilization is a lot harder than he expected. Meanwhile, Bailey is distraught with worry for his beloved horse. Eventually, the two are reunited, and Aztec decides that he prefers life at Horseland. Meanwhile Sarah is at Stanhope Riding School but later decides to stay with her friends at Horseland.
18	5	"Magic in the Moonlit Meadow"	Michael Edens	October 13, 2007	205
An elderly horse teaches Chili about a horse's innate herd instinct, a form of magic, and how it is beneficial for the whole group of horses.
19	6	"The Horse Whisperer"	Phil Harnage	October 20, 2007	206
While the other members of Horseland vie for a broadcast internship, competing fiercely with each other, Sarah tries to re-train Diablo, a stallion injured in a jumping accident for her friend Madison.
20	7	"Mosey"	Fred Holmes	October 27, 2007	207
Shep recalls over the course of a winter, the beloved barn cat of Horseland, Mosey, is becoming very old and sick. He eventually gets hit by a car and passes away while Sarah is asleep, leaving the barn so she does not see the body, and she spends all night searching for him until she finds out herself. Too heartbroken to even ride Scarlet, she spends the following days sulking. One day she lets out her feelings to Will while grooming Scarlet then he comforts her. Spring comes and Will asks her to nurse a small piglet she then names him Little Mosey and feels ready to ride again.
21	8	"The Big Parade"	Noelle Wright	November 3, 2007	208
Chloe and Zoey blame Sarah when things start disappearing around the stables, and the tension threatens their riding teamwork for an upcoming important parade. Scarlet then finds out a crow is responsible for the missing items after witnessing it take a coin and fly away.
22	9	"The Bluebird of Happiness"	John Loy	November 10, 2007	209
While on a ride, Zoey finds an injured bluebird that has been attacked by a hawk. She tries to nurture it back to health, and forms a bond with it. Despite her attachment to the bird, though, she fails to see that keeping such a bird caged is bad for a wild animal. Shep, Angora and Teeny find a way to teach her a lesson in compassion.
23	10	"Riding In Style"	Barbara Schwartz	November 17, 2007	210
An equestrian fashion designer comes to Horseland, and the gang is thrilled to model for the subsequent photo shoot. The clothes, however, are impractical and too dangerous to ride in. The kids must speak up before someone gets hurt.
24	11	"International Sarah"	Martha Moran	November 24, 2007	211
The riders go to France for an international exhibition and Sarah's father encourages her to befriend an Indian rider named Simbala, but the two seem to have nothing in common.
25	12	"Changing Spots"	Kevin O'Donnell	December 1, 2007	212
Alma, Chloe and Zoey strike a deal: Alma will be more competitive during an upcoming show jumping competition if Chloe and Zoey will be nice. When Alma has to face Talia Bentley, a rude super-competitive rider from Horseland's bitter rival, Stanhope Academy, she's not sure that being untrue to herself is such a good thing.: Note: Caroline Iliff voices Chloe from this episode onwards.
26	13	"The Whispering Gallery"	Martha Moran	December 8, 2007	213
Zoey accuses Molly of spreading malicious gossip about Sarah, even though it is not true. The friends become divided, and give Molly the silent treatment until the truth is revealed. The Sarah that Molly referred to was a singer named Sarah Malone, from Zoey's gossip magazine.

=== Season 3 (2008) ===
No. overall	No. in season	Title	Written by	Original release date	Prod. code
27	1	"The Secret"	Karl Geurs	September 13, 2008	301
When a new boy, Chase, visits Sarah at Horseland, Alma, Molly, Bailey, Chloe and Zoey think that he's her boyfriend, but Will tells them that Chase is Sarah's cousin. Chase helps them prepare for an upcoming dressage show, but refuses to read the directions. Chloe and Zoey think that he is illiterate, but it is revealed that he is, instead, dyslexic.
28	2	"The Newbies"	Phil Harnage	September 20, 2008	302
A Native American girl named Nani Cloud and her horse Sunburst come to Horseland as the new members. Zoey especially jumps to conclusions, which leads to a rivalry for a leadership role between the two girls. The two then have a cross country race to see who will be the team leader for an indoor cross country course. At the end they become good friends.
29	3	"A New Development"	Martha Moran	September 27, 2008	303
The Horseland gang discovers that their beloved meadow may be used as a construction site, and vow to stop the development.
30	4	"New Pup in Town"	Cynthia Harrison	October 4, 2008	304
Bailey finds a lost puppy, Cubby, and decides to adopt him, but both Alma and Shep begin to act jealous and, as usual, something's afoot.
31	5	"A Horse Named River"	Michael Edens	October 11, 2008	305
Chili's idol, a famous racehorse named River, comes to stay at Horseland, but River is retired, causing Chili to have some concern.
32	6	"The Last Drop"	John Loy	October 18, 2008	306
A heavy drought has hit Horseland and the surrounding countryside, and water is scarce. Chloe does not seem to care until she is led to believe that she used up the last drop.
33	7	"No News is Good News"	Eric Lewald	October 25, 2008	307
Chloe and Zoey are thrilled to be able to run Horseland's website, but their reporting rarely sticks to the truth, and rumors start spreading. They don't think anything of it until the Animal Health and Safety Department shows up and threatens to close Horseland down.
34	8	"Talk Talk"	Martha Moran	November 1, 2008	308
Molly gets her first cell phone, and loves it, but is chatting long enough while having less care for Calypso and her friends.
35	9	"Oh, Baby"	Michael Edens	November 8, 2008	309
Twin baby foals come for a temporary visit at Horseland while their mother recuperates. The kids lavish much of their attention on the adorable foals, making all the horses, especially Calypso and Aztec, jealous, but Scarlet really cares about the foals.
36	10	"Heritage Days"	Martha Moran	November 15, 2008	310
The Horseland gang is set to ride in a "Heritage Days" parade, but they can't decide on what sort of heritage they will represent.
37	11	"The Princess"	Len Uhley	November 22, 2008	311
A princess, Linnea, and her assistant come to ride for a day at Horseland. Chloe and Zoey want to make a socially advantageous friendship with the princess, but end up mistaking her for her assistant.
38	12	"Added Weight"	Michael Edens	November 29, 2008	312
When her friends tease her about her weight, Pepper becomes worried and goes on an unhealthy crash diet.
39	13	"Sister, Sister"	Carter Crocker	December 6, 2008	313
In a "The Gift of the Magi" story, Sarah and Alma try to convince the constantly bickering Stilton twins to tell each other "I Love You". Their plan fails until the two try to cheer their sister up, while at the same time sacrificing what they hold dear.

== Home media ==
In 2007, NCircle Entertainment released two DVDs of the series, titled "Friends First... Win or Lose" and "Taking the Heat", each containing two episodes. In 2008, two more DVDs, titled "To Tell the Truth" and "The Fast and the Fearless" were released, each containing three episodes. All of the DVDs included trailers for other cartoons, bonus features, and interactive menus. Mill Creek Entertainment released the complete series on DVD in Region 1 on October 12, 2010, containing all of the episodes of the series and including five other Cookie Jar-owned shows as bonus cartoons which are Busytown Mysteries, Mona the Vampire, Dance Revolution, The Country Mouse and the City Mouse Adventures and Postcards from Buster. Mill Creek also released a 10-episode best of set titled "The Greatest Stable Ever!" in the same year which features the first 10 episodes of the third season, and also included an episode of Mona the Vampire as a bonus. These releases have since been discontinued and are out of print. Later in January 2018, Mill Creek re-released the complete series on DVD, excluding the bonus cartoons. The Secret also appears as bonus episode on the Mona the Vampire: Show Us Your Fangs! DVD and on the first disc of Mona the Vampire: The Complete First Season DVD while The Newbies appears on the third disc.

== See also ==
- Horseland
