= Maddison Bullock =

American actress, producer, and writer

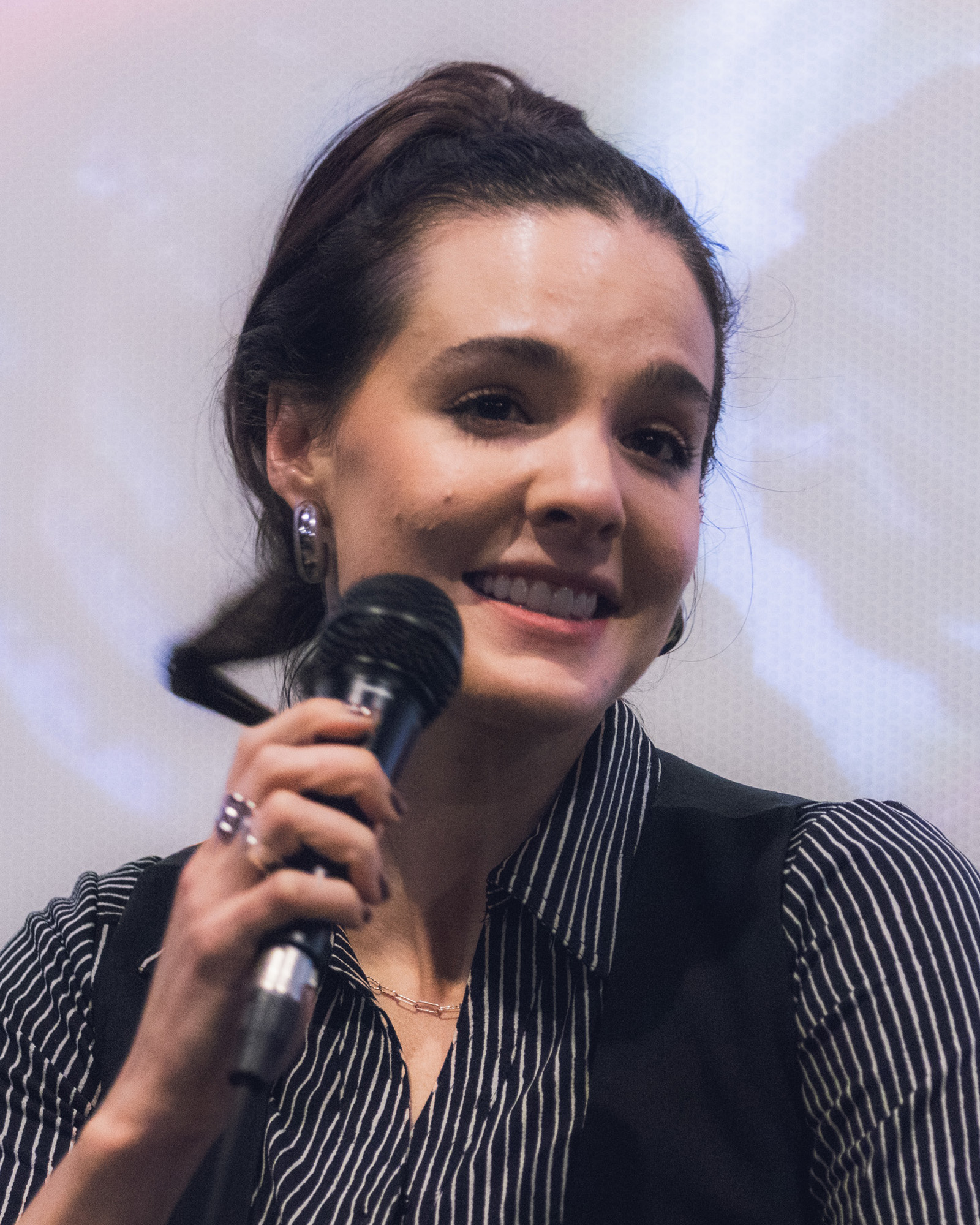
- Bullock in 2026
- Born: May 25, 1992 (age 34); Colorado, United States
- Occupations: Actress, producer, writer, former Figure Skater
- Website: www.maddisonbullock.com

Maddison Bullock (born May 25, 1992 in Colorado) is an American actress, producer, screen writer and former competitive figure skater. She is the owner of a production company called Bankable Pictures. Since 2012, she has made dozens of appearances in both television and film roles. She trained at the United States Olympic Training Center in Colorado for Figure Skating and competed for Team USA with the Los Angeles Ice Theater. She volunteers as a young girls ambassador for the anti-bullying organization Boo2Bullying.

== Personal life ==
Bullock was raised in Denver and spent most of her childhood at her family's second home in Winter Park, Colorado. Her father worked at a ski resort in Winter Park as an instructor and Bullock took skiing lessons during childhood. She began figure skating lessons as a toddler and later competing nationally and internationally, representing the United States, as a singles skater. She taught figure skating classes while competing as a competitive skater during her 20-year career.

She developed an interest in film and television making while attending college in Southern California at the University of California, Los Angeles. She graduated from the University of California, Los Angeles's screenwriting program in 2022. While attending college, she majored in History and took courses in production and co-founded UCLA's Intercollegiate Figure Skating Team.

== Film career ==
Bullock has appeared on NBC, ABC, Tru TV, and Netflix. Her former production company, Maddness Pictures, produced a film titled ICE: the Movie which was written by and starring Maddison. This film draws from her experience in professional Figure Skating and emphasizes good sportsmanship, family values, and artistic excellence. The film co-stars Lisa Mihelich. both Maddison and Lisa performed their own figure skating stunts for the film.

She auditioned for the role of Nancy Kerrigan in the 2017 Oscar-winning comedy/drama film, I, Tonya, but did not get the part. During her senior year at UCLA, she decided to write a screenplay based on her experiences as a former professional figure skater. The film she later wrote, ICE: The Movie, was filmed on location in Nebraska and Colorado, two locations where Bullock had trained as a skater during her childhood. An ice rink in Grand County, Colorado served as one of the filming locations for ICE: the Movie in December 2016; local actors and businesses were invited to participate in the film's production. In order to make the film more accurate and believable, Bullock cast professional figure skaters and hockey players to play characters.

== Figure skating career ==
Bullock is a former competitive figure skater. Her experience as a competitive figure skater allowed her to write an authentic film about the world of competitive ice skating called ICE: The Movie. The film also includes some of her former competitive skating coaches and judges. She represented the Peninsula Skating Club of Silicon Valley at the 2014 Central Pacific Regional Championships in 2014, where she finished in 13th place out of 13 competitors in the senior ladies category. In 2014, she competed at the Nationals for collegiate figure skating held at Adrian College in Adrian, Michigan, as one of two qualifying members of the UCLA figure skating team she co-founded in 2012 while attending university.

== Other ventures ==
Bullock serves as a Young Girl's Ambassador for Cassie Scerbo's Anti-Bullying Nonprofit Boo2Bullying. She founded her production company, Bankable Pictures, in June 2023. The company produces independent film projects and Bullock writes, produces, and directs content of her own creation.

== Selected filmography ==
=== Actress ===
Year	Title	Role	Category	Notes
2026	The Huntsman	Ava	Film	
2024	My Professor's Deadly Secret	Kristy	TV Movie	Lifetime TV movie
2024	You Can't Teach Love	Elizabeth	TV Movie	
2024	The Story Behind the Story	Alive Mother/Student #1 Jenny	TV series	Two episodes
2024	From Paradise with Love	Ann Minors	TV Movie	
2024	Death Spiral	Megan	Film	
2024	In Her Likeness	Lily	Film	
2024	Omni Loop	College zOYA	Film	
2023	A Christmas Vintage	Emily	Film	
2023	Dressed for Love	Jenna	TV Movie	
2022	Love Under the Lemon Tree	Beck	Film	
2021	Dying to Marry Him	Jody	TV Movie	Lifetime TV Movie; Lead role
2019	The Extraordinary Ordinary	Erica	Film	Lead role
2019	13 Reasons Why	Cheerleader	TV series	Ep #3.10
2019	The Debt of Maximillian	Bank Employee	Film	
2019	General Hospital	Waitress	TV series	Ep #1.14311, Ep #1.14312
2018	Solve	Carla	TV series	Ep #6.10
2018	Deacon	Sister Carla Knutson	Film	
2018	Ice: The Movie	Bailey Grantham	Film	Writer/Co-director/Producer/ Lead Actress
2017	Stasis	Circe	Film	
2017	Chris Webber's Full Court Pranks	Figure Skater	TV series	Ep #1.5
2017	Highway to Havasu	Michelle	Film	
2016	No Girls Allowed	Marty	TV series	Ep #1.1-4
2016	Westworld	Waltz Dancer	TV series	Ep #1.1
2016	FabLife	Special Guest	TV series	Ep #1.107
2012	Go On	Figure Skater	TV series	Ep #1.4

=== Producer ===
Year	Title	Category	Notes
2018	Ice: The Movie	Film	Also co-director
2016	No Girls Allowed	TV series	Ep #1.1-4

=== Writer ===
Year	Title	Category	Notes
2018	Ice: The Movie	Film	Also actress
2016	No Girls Allowed	TV series	Ep #1.1-4
