= Radio kol =

Radio KOL may refer to:

- Radio KOL (Kids Online), a defunct internet radio station for children owned by AOL
- KKOL (AM), a radio station (1300 AM) licensed to Seattle, Washington, United States formerly known as KOL
- Radio Kol Chai, an Israeli radio station
- The Kingdom of Loathing role-playing game's SHOUTcast radio station
