= Celetia Martin =

- Origin: London, England
- Genres: R&B, dance
- Occupations: Singer, songwriter
- Instrument: Vocals
- Years active: 1995–present
- Labels: Diesel Records, Big Life

Celetia Martin, also known simply as Celetia, is a British singer and songwriter.

== Career ==
Celetia has worked with and/or written for many artists including Eric Bellinger, Iggy Azalea, Usher, Jennifer Hudson, Janet Jackson, Fatman Scoop, The Saturdays, Conor Maynard, Wiley, Misha B, Jacob Banks, Dionne Bromfield, Kieran Alleyne, Jermain Jackman and Skepta.

Celetia has also worked as songwriter alongside producers such as The FanatiX, Michael Angelo, TJ Oosterhuis, Fraser T. Smith, Diztortion, Rymez, Young Yonni, Chris Loco and Carl Ryden.

She has also released music herself as an artist, including two albums and numerous singles. Three singles made the UK Singles Chart; "Rewind", "Runaway Skies" and "Sorry (You Lied to Me)" (with Masterstepz). She has also featured as vocalist on several songs such as "My Friend" by Groove Armada and on UK garage songs such as "You Got Me Singing" and "There I Go" with Y-Tribe, as well as "Sorry (You Lied to Me)". After two years touring with Groove Armada, Celetia temporarily moved to LA to pursue songwriting where she worked with producers Soulshock and Karlin, Ron Fair and The Underdogs.

She co-wrote the songs "Goin' Crazy" for Ashley Tisdale (from Headstrong) and "Bubblegum" for the Slumber Party Girls (from Dance Revolution). "Bubblegum" was then the most requested song on Disney Radio.

In 2014, Celetia entered a new business venture with the head of Royalty Network publishing, Frank Liwall to form her own publishing company, Forty Nine Publishing, for her to scout and sign upcoming new writers and producers.

== Discography ==
=== Albums ===
- Celetia (1996), Diesel
- Runaway Skies (1998), Big Life

=== Singles ===
- 1996: "Missing Your Love"
- 1996: "Are U Ready"
- 1997: "Special"
- 1998: "Rewind" – UK No. 29
- 1998: "Runaway Skies" – UK No. 66
- 1998: "On the Phone"
- 1998: In the Mix EP
- 1999: "Give It Up"
- 2001: "Sorry (You Lied to Me)" (with Masterstepz) – UK No. 91
