= Bedrooms (film) =

- Directed by: Youssef Delara; Michael D. Olmos; Victor Teran
- Written by: Youssef Delara; Wynne Renz; Victor Teran; Rebecca Woolf
- Produced by: Youssef Delara; Amir Delara; Victor Teran; Maury Rogow; Shab Azma
- Starring: Dylan Sprayberry; Julie Benz; Moon Bloodgood; Sarah Clarke; Xander Berkeley; Dee Wallace; Barry Bostwick; Jordan Belfi; Jesse Garcia; Enn Reitel
- Cinematography: Ben Kufrin
- Edited by: Eric R. Brodeur; Youssef Delara
- Music by: The Angel
- Distributed by: Cima Productions; Castle2000 Films; Olmos Productions
- Release date: August 20, 2010 (Los Angeles)
- Running time: 85 minutes
- Country: United States
- Language: English

Bedrooms is a 2010 drama film directed and written by Youssef Delara. Starring Julie Benz, Moon Bloodgood, Sarah Clarke, Xander Berkeley, Dee Wallace and Barry Bostwick. It premieres August 20, 2010 at the Los Angeles Latino Film Festival 2010.

== Plot ==
Bedrooms is about the exploration of relationships between humans, the tough choices we have to face to see them work or need to move on and the complications. Julian and Beth are a married couple at the vital turning point of their young relationship. In another, Anna and Harry are a married couple who are suffering from infidelity, while Sal [a pizza delivery boy] unwittingly becomes the ultimate reason of their conflict. Marnie and Roger are a retired couple who have had a long but unusual relationship together. Janet is a divorced mother of ten-year-old twins who decide to create their own separate spaces in the room they share by building a wall out of all their toys.

== Cast ==
- Dylan Sprayberry as Max
- Julie Benz as Anna
- Moon Bloodgood as Beth
- Sarah Clarke as Janet
- Xander Berkeley as Harry
- Dee Wallace as Marnie
- Barry Bostwick as Roger
- Jordan Belfi as Julian
- Jesse Garcia as Sal
- Enn Reitel as Walter
- Ellery Sprayberry as Daisy
- Maury Rogow as John
