= Ellery Sprayberry =

American actress and voice over artist (born 2000)

- Born: October 26, 2000 (age 25); Houston, Texas, U.S.
- Occupations: Actress; voice over artist; aerialist
- Years active: 2006–present
- Relatives: Dylan Sprayberry (brother)

Ellery Sprayberry (born October 26, 2000) is an American actress and voice over artist best known for Wakefield, Baskets, The Bronze, and The Young and the Restless.

== Early life ==
Sprayberry was born and raised in Houston, Texas along with her brother Dylan Sprayberry. She began acting at the age of six after being asked to audition with her brother for commercials and print modeling. Both children relocated to Los Angeles with their parents in 2006 in order to pursue their careers.

== Career ==
Sprayberry made multiple guest appearances on popular television shows during her early childhood. She was cast in the recurring role of Piper Welch on The Young and The Restless in 2011 for which she was nominated for a Young Artist Award in 2012.

In addition to her on-screen performances, she has worked steadily in voice over in major studio films including Shrek Forever After, Ice Age: A Mammoth Christmas, and The Hunger Games: Catching Fire.

In 2014, she landed the role of Teenage Hope in The Bronze opposite Melissa Rauch, Sebastian Stan, and Gary Cole and attended the film's opening night premiere at the 2015 Sundance Film Festival.

She also co-starred in the film Wakefield opposite Bryan Cranston and Jennifer Garner, released on May 26, 2017, by IFC Films.

In August 2017, she appeared in a guest star role on the MTV series Teen Wolf (on which her older brother Dylan starred as Liam Dunbar).

Sprayberry is an aerialist and frequently performs her own stunts in films and television shows.

== Filmography ==
=== Film ===
Year	Title	Role	Notes
2008	Soccer Mom	Kelci Handler	
2009	The Honeysting	Katie Wilder	Short film
2009	Bound by a Secret	Lila	TV movie
2010	Shrek Forever After	ADR Group (voice)	
2010	Bedrooms	Daisy	
2011	Ice Age: A Mammoth Christmas	Additional Voices	TV Short
2012	The Butterfly Room	Julie	
2013	The Hunger Games: Catching Fire	ADR Voice Artist	
2014	Cry of the Butterfly	Kate	
2015	Pancake Castle	Jody	Short film
2015	The Breakfast Club	Jade	Video
2015	The Bronze	Teenage Hope	
2016	Pinky	Shari	Short film
2016	Wakefield	Giselle	
2017	Atomic	Gwen, Co-producer	Short film
2017	Circus Sam	Alice	Short film
2018	A Father's Nightmare	Katie	TV movie

=== Television ===
Year	Title	Role	Notes
2007	House M.D.	Girl	Episode: "Act Your Age"
2007	Private Practice	Sasha	Episode: "In Which Addison Finds the Magic"
2007	CSI: Miami	Megan Lambert	Episode: "CSI: My Nanny"
2007	Journeyman	Caroline Vasser	Episode: "The Hanged Man"
2008	Criminal Minds	Chelsea Robinson	Episode: "Masterpiece"
2009	Brothers & Sisters	Girl	Episode: "A Father's Dream"
2009	Pushing Daisies	Young Olive	Episode: "Window Dressed to Kill"
2009	The Forgotten	Claire Morse	Episode: "River John"
2009	The Mentalist	Gail Hines	Episode: "Black Gold and Red Blood"
2010	The Event	Abby Stern	Episode: "Your World to Take"
2011	The Cape	Blonde Girl	Episode: "Scales"
2011	The Young and the Restless	Piper Welch	17 episodes
2012	The Joey & Elise Show	Herself / Actress	2 episodes
2013	Back in the Game	Danica	Episode: "The Change Up"
2015	About A Boy	Becky	Episode: "About a Love in the Air"
2016	Baskets	Kelly	Episode: "Uncle Dad"
2017	Teen Wolf	Tierney	Episode: "Pressure Test"

== Awards and nominations ==
In 2012, Sprayberry was nominated for Best Performance in a Daytime TV Series by a Young Actress at the Young Artist Awards for her role as Piper Welch on The Young and the Restless.
