= Dylan Sprayberry =

American actor (born 1998)

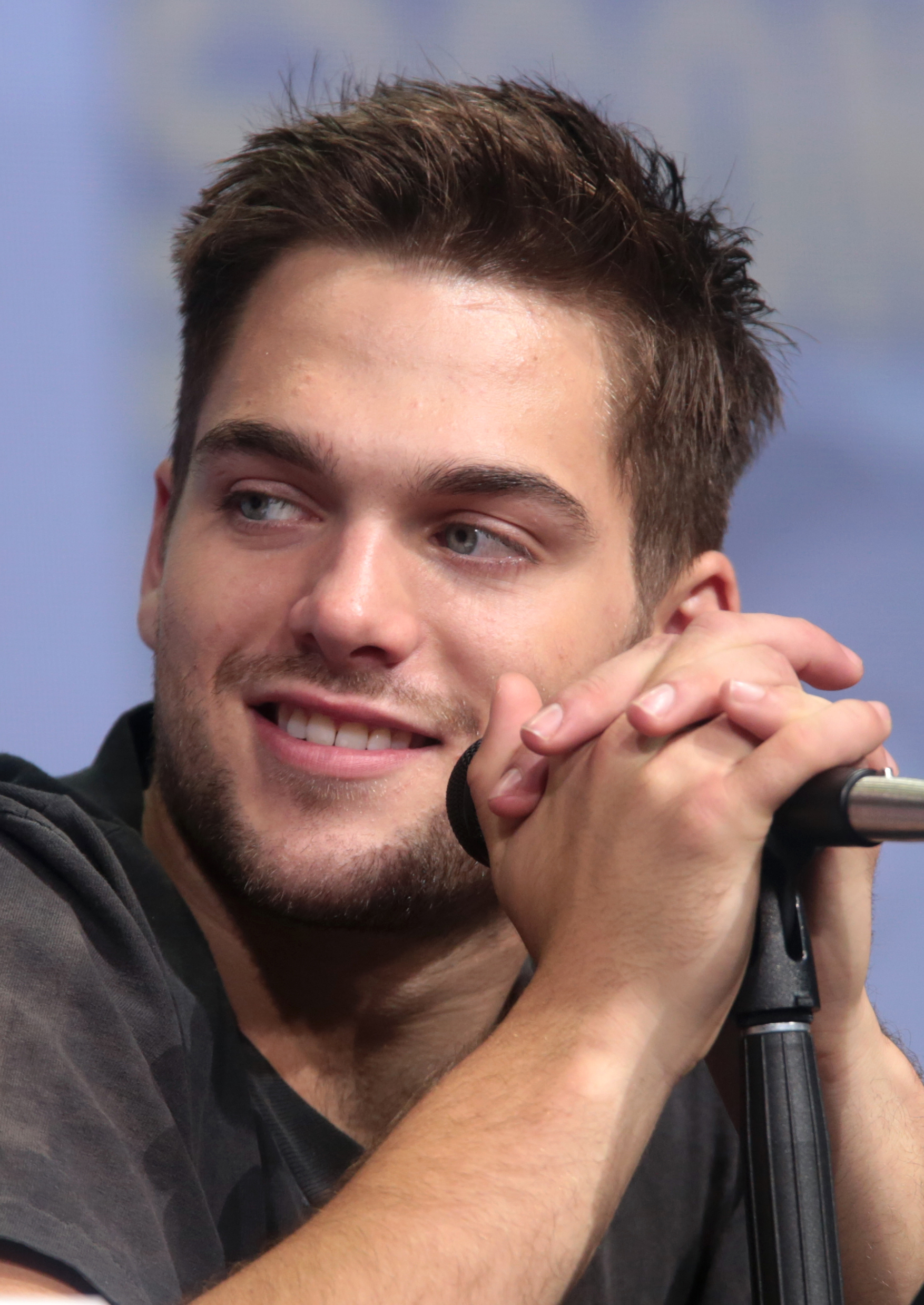
- Sprayberry at the 2017 San Diego Comic-Con
- Born: July 7, 1998 (age 28); Houston, Texas, U.S.
- Education: Brighton Hall
- Occupations: Actor; musician
- Years active: 2007–present
- Known for: Man of Steel, Teen Wolf
- Children: 1
- Relatives: Ellery Sprayberry (sister)

Dylan Sprayberry (born July 7, 1998) is an American actor known for portraying the young Clark Kent in the 2013 film Man of Steel and Liam Dunbar on the MTV series Teen Wolf from 2014 to 2017. From 2018 to 2019, Sprayberry played Henry Richmond in the American supernatural thriller television series Light as a Feather.

== Early life ==
Sprayberry was born July 7, 1998, and raised in Houston, Texas, and later attended West University Elementary. He booked his first acting role at the age of three in a public service announcement for PBS. He continued working in commercials and print as a child.

His sister Ellery Sprayberry is an actress. Both children relocated to Los Angeles with their parents in 2006 in order to pursue their careers. He then attended Brighton Hall in Los Angeles in between pursuing his career.

== Career ==
After relocating to Los Angeles, Sprayberry appeared in multiple comedy and drama network television shows, including iCarly, Tracey Ullman's State of the Union, Criminal Minds, and Glee. He also played supporting roles in the feature films The Three Gifts opposite Dean Cain and Bedrooms. He then landed the breakout role of the young Clark Kent in the 2013 film Man of Steel, the first film in the DC Extended Universe, opposite Amy Adams, Michael Shannon, Diane Lane, and Kevin Costner.

Sprayberry is best known for MTV's Teen Wolf in which he played the role of Liam Dunbar from 2014 to 2017. He first appeared on the show in a recurring role during the show's fourth season before being upped to series regular for its fifth season, which premiered on June 29, 2015. He appeared at Comic-Con with the Teen Wolf cast before the show concluded in 2017. He originally auditioned for the part of Young Derek in season 3, but he was too young at the time. During his time on the show, Sprayberry accumulated a significant fanbase.

In 2016, he appeared in the adventure film Vanished – Left Behind: Next Generation. The film is based on The New York Times best-selling young-adult book Vanished by Tim LaHaye and Jerry Jenkins, and features a cast from MTV's Teen Wolf, Nickelodeon's The Haunted Hathaways, and Lifetime's Flowers in the Attic.

After the conclusion of Teen Wolf, Sprayberry continued his career with a supporting role in the 2018 thriller film Malibu Tapes, script writing, and recording his debut original EP. He plays the guitar, bass, and drums and, prior to appearing on Teen Wolf, was in a band called The Dead Toms. He is a fan of punk rock and cites his favorite bands as Black Flag, Minor Threat, The Stooges, Neck Deep, The Story So Far, and Blink-182.

Sprayberry cites Jack Nicholson, Robert De Niro, Sean Penn, Joaquin Phoenix, Tom Hardy, and Jake Gyllenhaal as his inspirations.

In September 2021, it was announced that a reunion film for Teen Wolf had been ordered by Paramount+, with Jeff Davis returning as a screenwriter and executive producer of the film. The majority of the original cast members, including Sprayberry, were set to reprise their roles. The film was released on January 26, 2023.

== Personal life ==
In 2026, Sprayberry revealed that he had been a Scientologist for the past three years, having been introduced to the Church of Scientology after recovering from drug addiction.

== Filmography ==
=== Film ===
Year	Title	Role	Notes
2007	My Father	Young Steven	
2007	The Sunday Man	Bully	
2008	Soccer Mom	Sammy Handler	
2009	Chasing a Dream	8-year-old John Van Horn	
2009	Old Dogs	Cute Soccer Kid	
2009	Reconciliation	10-year-old Grant	
2010	Bedrooms	Max	
2011	Shuffle	Young Lovell	
2011	Spooky Buddies	Rodney	
2013	Man of Steel	13-year-old Clark Kent	
2014	Cry of the Butterfly	Homeless Child	
2016	Vanished – Left Behind: Next Generation	Flynn	
2018	The Row	Carter West	
2020	Lost Girls: Angie's Story	Mario	
2021	Malibu Horror Story	Josh Davidson	
2022	Sick	DJ Cole	
2023	Teen Wolf: The Movie	Liam Dunbar	
2023	Baby Blue	Hutch	

=== Television ===
Year	Title	Role	Notes
2008	Criminal Minds	Sam Cunningham	Episode: "Brothers in Arms"
2008	iCarly	Matthew	Episode: "iHave a Lovesick Teacher"
2008	MADtv	Tyler	Episode: #14.2
2008	Spaced	Goat Boy	Television film
2008–2009	Tracey Ullman's State of the Union	Jesse	Guest role; 2 episodes
2009	Chasing a Dream	8-year-old John Van Horn	Television film
2009	The Three Gifts	Mike Crane	Television film
2012	Common Law	Hunter	Guest role; 2 episodes
2012	Glee	Young Cooper	Episode: "Big Brother"
2014–2017	Teen Wolf	Liam Dunbar	Recurring role (season 4); main role (seasons 5–6)
2018–2019	Light as a Feather	Henry Richmond	Main role
2023	Catfish: The TV Show	Himself	Episode: #8.74

== Discography ==
=== EPs ===
Title	Extended play details	Ref.
Home Recordings, Vol. 1	Release date: February 9, 2025; Genre: Indie folk; Label: Self-released	
Home Recordings, Vol. 2	Release date: March 11, 2025; Genre: Indie folk; Label: Self-released	

== Awards and nominations ==
Year	Award	Category	Work	Result	Ref.
2014	Saturn Awards	Best Performance by a Younger Actor	Man of Steel	Nominated	
2016	Saturn Awards	Best Performance by a Younger Actor in a Television Series	Teen Wolf	Nominated	
