= Dance Revolution (album) =

Studio album by Slumber Party Girls
- Released: October 3, 2006
- Recorded: August – September 2006
- Genre: Dance, pop, R&B
- Length: 40:04
- Label: Geffen Records
- Producer: Ron Fair

Professional ratings
Review scores
Source	Rating
Allmusic	3.5/5 stars
Bullz-Eye.com	0/5 stars

Dance Revolution is the debut and only album from American girl group, The Slumber Party Girls. It was released on October 3, 2006 by Geffen Records.

== Promotion ==
"My Life" was released on May 8, 2007 as the album's lead and only single. It is also featured in Bratz: The Movie and on its soundtrack.

Music videos for "Dance With Me", "The Texting Song", "Salsa", "Summer's Gone", "Make a Wish", "My Life", "I Got Your Back", "Carousel", "Back to Basics", "Good Times", "Countdown", "Bubblegum" and "Eavesdroppin'" were produced to promote the album. They are currently available for purchase on iTunes.

The group further promoted the album through live performances, mostly on Dance Revolution since they were the show's house band. All songs, except "The Slumber Party Girls Theme" and "Dance Revolution Theme", were performed on the show. They also made a guest appearance on The Early Show on the album's release date to promote it and performed "Countdown". During that special guest appearance, they spoke of a made-for-TV movie and television series in development. However, due to the group's disbandment in the summer of 2007, those projects were cancelled.

Despite heavy promotion on the album, it failed to chart on the Billboard 200 chart or any major chart and was a commercial failure.

== Critical reception ==
The album earned mixed reviews from music critics. Marisa Brown of AllMusic gave the album a positive review, calling it "With good beats and hooks, It's absolutely nothing that hasn't already been done a million times before, but for what it is, it's done pretty well". However, Bullz-Eye.com's Jason Thompson panned the album. criticizing it's forgettable and disposable pop sound. He also noted that none of the songs were memorable, saying "They’re all as wretched and forgettable as you would imagine they are. There is nothing here even worth making fun of in a completely base way, it’s that pointless". He gave the album zero stars out of five.

== Track listing ==
1. "Countdown" (Kura, Mazza, Ridel) – 2:55
2. "The Texting Song (BTW, This is All 4 U)" (Crawford, Ferguson, Mischle, Ridel) – 2:56
3. "Bubblegum" (Emmanuel, Fair, Martin, Ridel) – 3:24
4. "Make a Wish" (Fair, Munson, Ridel) – 3:05
5. "Good Times" (Crawford, Ferguson, Louriano, Ridel) – 2:51
6. "I Got Your Back" (Crawford, Fair, Ferguson, Louriano, Ridel) – 3:29
7. "My Life" (Harris, Mazza, Ridel) – 2:50
8. "Dance with Me" (Fair, Mischke, Munson, Ridel) – 2:44
9. "Carousel" (Fair, Ridel, Scapa) – 3:26
10. "Salsa" (Harris, Mazza, Ridel, Sandstrom) – 3:15
11. "Summer's Gone" (Fair, Modesto, Ridel, Sheth) – 2:57
12. "Eavesdropping" (Brucculeri, Fair, Hidalgo, Kelley, Pascal, Ridel) – 3:34
13. "Back to Basics" (Fair, Hendricks, Ridel) – 2:46
14. "The Slumber Party Girls Theme" (bonus track) (Fair, Ridel) – 1:12
15. "Dance Revolution Theme" (bonus track) (Fair, Ridel) – 2:36

== Personnel ==
- Charlie Bisharat – Violin (Electric)
- David Brookwell – Executive Producer
- Christian Brucculeri – Producer
- Anthony Caruso – Assistant Engineer
- Luis Conte – Percussion
- Tyler Coomes – Drum Programming
- Drop Squad – Producer
- John Easton – Producer
- Mike "Angry" Eleopoulos – Engineer
- Colin Emmanuel – Producer
- Ron Fair – Harmonica, Percussion, Arranger, Keyboards, Programming, Producer, Executive Producer, Vocal Arrangement, Mixing, Slide Whistle, Toy Piano
- Deb Fenstermacher – Marketing
- Gary Grant – Horn
- Bernie Grundman – Mastering
- Ron Harris – Keyboards, Producer
- Ron Harris – Bass
- Hylah Hedgepeth – Artist Coordination
- Kyle Hendricks "Rain" – Producer
- Tal Herzberg – Bass, Producer, Digital Editing
- Jerry Hey – Horn, Horn Arrangements
- Andy Heyward – Executive Producer
- Dan Higgins – Horn
- Jun Ishizeki – Engineer
- Judy – Stylist
- Carlene K – Make-Up
- Kimberly Kelley – Guitar, Producer
- Gelly Kusuma – Assistant Engineer
- Mike Maliani – Executive Producer
- John Marx – Representation
- Anthony Mazza – Guitar, Producer
- Sean McNamara – Executive Producer
- Moises Modesto – Producer
- Peter Mokran – Mixing
- Dean Nelson – Mixing Assistant
- Sheryl Nields – Photography
- Jeff Norskog – Management
- Dave Pensado – Mixing
- Jack Joseph Puig – Mixing
- Bill Reichenbach Jr. – Horn
- Stefanie Ridel – Producer, Executive Producer, Vocal Arrangement
- Sammy – Stylist
- Nicky Scapa – Producer
- Ashish Sheth – Producer
- Justin Siegel – A&R
- Sabrina Sweet – Make-Up
- Michelle Thomas – Marketing
- Eric Weaver – Mixing Assistant
