= Wakefield (film) =

- Theatrical release poster
- Directed by: Robin Swicord
- Written by: Robin Swicord
- Based on: "Wakefield" by E. L. Doctorow
- Produced by: Bonnie Curtis; Wendy Federman; Julie Lynn; Carl Moellenberg; Sainty Nelsen; Eric Nelsen
- Starring: Bryan Cranston; Jennifer Garner; Beverly D'Angelo; Jason O'Mara; Pippa Bennett-Warner
- Cinematography: Andrei Bowden-Schwartz
- Edited by: Matt Maddox
- Music by: Aaron Zigman
- Production company: Mockingbird Pictures
- Distributed by: IFC Films
- Release dates: September 2, 2016 (Telluride); May 19, 2017 (United States)
- Running time: 108 minutes
- Country: United States
- Language: English
- Box office: $874,187

Wakefield is a 2016 American drama film written and directed by Robin Swicord and starring Bryan Cranston and Jennifer Garner. It is based on the 2008 short story of the same name by E. L. Doctorow published in The New Yorker, which was in turn inspired by the 1835 story of the same title by Nathaniel Hawthorne.

The film had its world premiere at the Telluride Film Festival on September 2, 2016 and was released in the United States on May 19, 2017.

== Plot ==
Howard Wakefield, an attorney in New York City, is unhappy in his marriage of fifteen years to Diana, an art curator and former dancer. They used flirtation with other people to add excitement to their sex life, but Diana soon begins to resent it. One night, Howard returns home late from his commute, which has been disrupted and delayed by a widespread power outage, and is distracted by a raccoon he sees entering his garage, which is detached from the house. He chases the raccoon into the garage's attic and realizes he has a perfect view into his house, where his wife and two daughters, Taylor and Giselle, are eating dinner. He ignores calls from his wife and is amused at her clear annoyance, but is insulted when she angrily throws his plate of dinner away instead of saving it for him. To avoid a fight, he decides to wait a bit to go into the house, but he ends up falling asleep.

The next morning, Howard realizes Diana will never believe his story of spending the night in the garage and will insist he was having an affair, so he plans to wait for her to leave for work before going in. Instead, he is shocked when, after finding his car still in the garage, she calls the police to report him missing. Howard feels bad when he sees Diana cry, but before he can go inside, his overbearing mother-in-law, Babs, shows up to comfort her. Babs and Diana appear to argue about his absence, with Diana showing her mother there is no evidence he has taken any money to run off. Howard finally goes inside to shower after Diana leaves for work, planning to just deal with the fallout of his absence, before he starts resenting the idea that she is carrying on with her routine after his disappearance. He realizes that his disappearance is probably a relief to her, believing that she probably thinks that she married the wrong man. He cleans up any evidence that he was at the house, grabs some food from the pantry and returns to the garage.

Howard is overjoyed with abandoning all his responsibilities and amused that people would surely suspect his wife's involvement in his disappearance, just as he is amused at seeing her tackle the chores that used to be his responsibility. He feels unshackled and free as he spends his time doing puzzles, reading and observing his family and their neighbors. He also happily realizes that he is seeing more of his daughters' lives than he did before. For the first few days, he continues to sneak food and amenities from his house. He soon realizes that he no longer cares about having clients and being freshly showered and shaved, and vows not to take anything from his old life or spend the money he has in his wallet. He begins foraging each night through the trash and showers in the backyard bathroom built by his neighbor, Dr. Sondervan, who runs a small home for mentally disabled youth.

As months go by and he grows a beard and long hair, Howard is free to walk about town during the day, where people dismiss him as homeless. The only people who discover his presence are Herbert and Emily, two of Dr. Sondervan's residents, who follow him back to the attic one day. He reflects on the beginning of his relationship with Diana, whom he met when she was dating his best friend Dirk Morrison, an extremely competitive Wall Street trader. Through manipulation and dishonesty, Howard managed to take Diana away from Dirk, and as he thinks back, Howard wonders if he ever truly loved her. Nevertheless, he realizes that by simply disappearing, he has the upper hand in controlling her love life. If he had just divorced her, she would be free to date other men, but while he is missing under mysterious circumstances, she can't easily move on to another man.

As summer turns into fall, Howard no longer basks in his freedom but instead feels like he has become a prisoner of his choices. He has an epiphany and realizes that he had been a selfish, jealous and resentful husband and father, who made himself out to be a victim. While he feels happy to be free from himself, he also feels that his family is happier without him. He also realizes that he has never loved Diana more and one day, he walks out onto the sidewalk, but Diana does not recognize him.

Diana appears to be developing a romantic relationship, and Howard is stunned when he sees it is with Dirk. Howard surmises that Dirk would have probably told Diana the lies he had said that broke them up years ago. He decides to give Diana an honest chance this time to pick with whom she wants to be. After getting himself cleaned up and buying a new suit, Howard works up the courage to walk back into his house. As he sees his wife and daughters decorating the Christmas tree, he envisions them being overjoyed at his return, and also envisions a second scenario in which they respond with horror. He pauses, and then comes in through the front door and announces, "I'm home."

== Cast ==
- Bryan Cranston as Howard Wakefield
- Jennifer Garner as Diana Wakefield
- Beverly D'Angelo as Babs, Diana's mother
- Jason O'Mara as Dirk Morrison, Howard's former friend and Diana's ex-boyfriend
- Ian Anthony Dale as Ben Jacobs, an attorney at Howard's firm
- Alexander Zale as Dr. Sondervan, the Wakefields' next-door neighbor
- Pippa Bennett-Warner as Emily, mentally disabled ward of Dr. Sondervan
- Isaac Leyva as Herbert, mentally disabled ward of Dr. Sondervan.
- Ellery Sprayberry as Giselle Wakefield, Howard and Diana's teen daughter
- Victoria Bruno as Taylor Wakefield, Howard and Diana's teen daughter
- Tracey Walter as Homeless Man

== Production ==
On November 11, 2015, it was announced that Robin Swicord would direct a drama film based on the short story "Wakefield" by E. L. Doctorow, after the short story of the same title by Nathaniel Hawthorne. Bonnie Curtis and Julie Lynn would produce the film through Mockingbird Pictures, along with Elliott Webb as co-producer. Swicord had written the screenplay after meeting with Doctorow and discussing her ideas on how to present the story on film. She said, "I had to really interrogate the story before I ever got up the courage to meet with Doctorow, because I knew he was going to want to know what kind of movie this was going to be. I met him and we had great conversations. We emailed and talked on the phone, and started the process of getting him to trust that we had all our ducks in a row."

Principal photography on the film began on November 30, 2015, in Pasadena, California, and ended on January 8, 2016.

== Release ==
The film had its world premiere at the Telluride Film Festival on September 2, 2016. It went onto screen at the Toronto International Film Festival on September 9, 2016. Shortly after, IFC Films acquired distribution rights to the film and set the film for a May 19, 2017 limited release. The movie has earned $262,566 at the North America box office as of July 20, 2017.

=== Critical response ===
On Rotten Tomatoes, the film has a 74% rating based on 76 reviews, with an average rating of 6.4/10. The site's critical consensus reads, "Thanks to a committed, powerhouse performance by Bryan Cranston, Wakefield is a fascinating character study of a decidedly unpleasant character." On Metacritic, the film has a weighted average score of 62 out of 100, based on 24 critics.

Richard Roeper of the Chicago Sun-Times wrote: "In this haunting, darkly funny and elegiac mood piece, Cranston once again displays a nearly unparalleled ability to make us like and care about men who are selfish and impetuous and reckless — yet still seem to have a core of decency buried deep within." Peter Travers of Rolling Stone wrote: "The role is a beast, and Cranston, in a tour de force of touching gravity and aching humanism, gives it everything he's got. It's astounding to watch, and an award-caliber performance from an actor who keeps springing surprises." On RogerEbert.com, critic Glenn Kenny said Swicord "has made a smart, intriguing, sometimes provocative and often oddly moving picture of Wakefield," which he called "kind of a wonder".
