= Soccer Mom (film) =

- Directed by: Greg Cathy George
- Written by: Frederick Ayeroff
- Produced by: Nicholas Bogner; Michael Hennessy; Jonathan Bogner
- Starring: Missi Pyle; Emily Osment; Dan Cortese; Kristen Wilson; Elon Gold; Master P
- Cinematography: Jeffrey Venditti
- Edited by: Jim Makiej
- Music by: Gerald Brunskill
- Production companies: Ladies' Home Journal; Bogner Entertainment, Inc. Blueprint Entertainment
- Distributed by: Anchor Bay Entertainment
- Release date: September 30, 2008
- Running time: 91 minutes
- Country: United States
- Language: English
- Budget: $3,500,000

Soccer Mom is an American 2008 direct-to-video film starring Missi Pyle and Emily Osment.

== Plot ==
A warm-hearted comedy about a compulsive soccer mom who masquerades as a famous Italian soccer star hired to coach her daughter's floundering soccer team, the Mar Vista Galaxy, then struggles frantically to keep her wacky charade going long enough to see the girls win their big tournament.

== Cast ==
- Missi Pyle as Wendy Handler, Becca's mother
- Emily Osment as Becca Handler, Wendy's daughter and an avid soccer player
- Dan Cortese as Lorenzo Vincenzo, a famous Italian soccer player
- Kristen Wilson as Dee Dee, Tiffany's mother
- Elon Gold as Tony, a colleague of Wendy
- Master P as Wally
- Dylan Sprayberry as Sam Handler, Wendy's son
- Ellery Sprayberry as Kelci Handler, Wendy's younger daughter
- Robert Cavanah as Harry
- Cassie Scerbo as Tiffany, a player for the Malibu Majestics
- Jennifer Sciole as Patti Duchamps
- Steve Hytner as Coach Kenny
- Victoria Jackson as Dr. Renneker
- William O'Leary as Harley the Tournament Director
- Joy Fawcett as herself

== Production ==
The film was shot in, and takes place in, Los Angeles and its surrounding areas between February 12 and March 10, 2008, on a budget of 3.5 million dollars.

== Reception ==
In the Texan newspaper The Tribune, Ms. Hollywood D. Light called Soccer Mom "a great teen and kid-friendly family funny movie with a positive and uplifting message", giving it "two thumbs up" and labelled the acting "the best part of the movie". Writing for the review website 7M Pictures, Kevin Carr gave the film two-and-a-half stars out of a possible five, stating "this film works for the direct-to-DVD family market", praising both Missi Pyle and Emily Osment while criticizing some of the comedy beats and the amount of "teenage girl angst", concluding that "ultimately this is a nice flick for families with daughters and kids interested in soccer". Similarly on the website Bum's Corner, Porfle wrote that "while there are a few moments of awkward melodrama along the way [...], most of Soccer Mom is light, fluffy comedy that doesn't come close to the dizzying heights of wackyness we used to get from those old Disney comedies like Freaky Friday and Superdad, but is still harmless fun", while praising Pyle's performance and those of Steve Hytner and Dan Cortese, though not being impressed with Osment and giving the film 3 stars out of 5. The same rating was given by Joly Herman for Common Sense Media, who found the film to be "pretty light fare" and "some of the plot twists [...] a little predictable" but liked Pyle's and Osment's performances as well as the focus on girls' sports and opined that "moms and daughters will enjoy watching it together". On DVD Verdict, Erich Asperschlager was critical of how Pyle looked in man makeup, but wrote that "once you get past the premise and the makeup, Soccer Mom is a middle-of-the-road kids flick with a good message about family—even if it's the same message found in plenty of better movies", going to praise Pyle, Osment, Cortese as well as Cassie Scerbo and concluding that the film "succeeds more than it fails, and ultimately fares better than a lot of its family movie competition". Home Theater Info, finally, only awarded the film 4 out of 10 stars, but remained mostly positive, concluding that "this is fun on a juvenile level but just perfect for that rainy Saturday afternoon when the kids are stuck in the house".

== Soundtrack ==
The film features the 2009 song "Don't Change for Me" by Matthew Moon in the closing credits, which was later covered by Gin Blossoms on their 2010 album No Chocolate Cake.

== See also ==
- List of association football films
