= Horseland =

- Developer: Horseland LLC
- Publisher: Horseland LLC
- Platform: web browser
- Release: Horseland: 1998; Horseland Jr.: 1 September 2006
- Genre: Sim horse game Digital Pet
- Mode: Multiplayer

Horseland was an online community and browser game where members took care of, bred, trained and showed horses and dogs. Begun in 1994 in the United States, Horseland had grown to have more than 8 million users who played from all over the world. Most of the players were females from age 10 to 22. In September 2006, an animated cartoon series based on the website was launched in the United States. The cartoon is now distributed around the world. The game is no longer online, having closed in April 2019.

== History ==
Horseland, a sim horse game, grew out of a webpage dedicated to horses that launched in 1994. The original website featured bulletin boards and forums where members discussed their love of horses and participated in horse-themed role playing games. A system of gameplay soon developed, and Horseland LLC launched the Horseland game shortly afterwards. The Horseland game featured the ability to create, own and train virtual horses that players could care for and compete with in online shows. As the popularity of the game grew, the interest in Horseland spawned a new Junior Version, and later, a series of cartoons and short novels. In 2006, Horseland LLC partnered with DIC Entertainment to produce a cartoon based on the website.

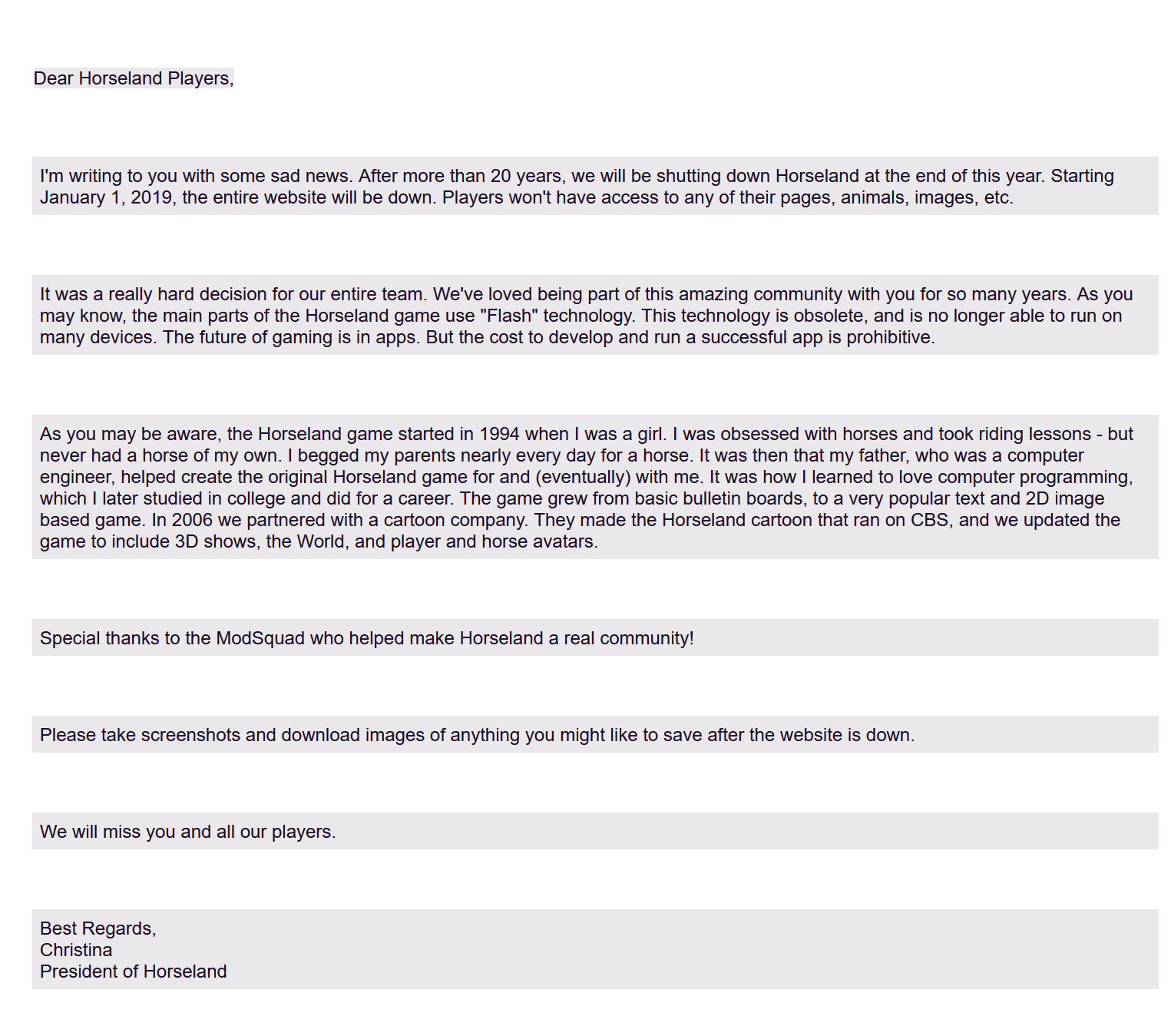
2019 message from company's president regarding company shutting down

On October 28, 2008, Horseland released a revamped website. It introduced a 2D interactive world where players could ride their horses and chat with others, as well as a new store selling virtual clothing and tack. The update also added interactive 3D jumping shows. Alongside these changes, Horseland introduced a micro-transaction pay model through Horseland "Coins" which they sold through a variety of pay options. Horseland also offered a "Premium Membership" which unlocked exclusive features in the game, such as owning a boarding stable where other players could pay to keep their horses.

The revamped game was met with criticism from longtime players and membership appeared to decline steadily. Large parts of the game used Flash, and as popular browsers stopped supporting the format, many parts of the game became nonfunctional. No official updates from the game's staff were made from the end of 2016 until sometime in late 2018 when it was announced that the game would be permanently closed on January 1, 2019. The game officially went offline in April 2019.

== Horseland Junior Game ==
"My Horse" Horseland Jr.

The Horseland Jr. game was launched on September 1, 2006, featuring characters from the Horseland cartoon. It was a very simplified version of Horseland World and suitable for kids younger than 13 years old. The graphics were simple and colorful, appealing to the younger audience. The Junior game was a Flash-based game similar to the World game in that players could create and interact with a virtual horse. Horseland Jr. let players select a horse (choosing from characters you'd also find in the Horseland cartoon series) and pick the horse's name and the player name. Players could visit their horse in its stall, and care for it in a variety of ways (shown in the image on the right). The horse needed to be fed daily, exercised regularly, seen by a veterinarian and farrier, and fitted with tack.

There were jumping shows that players could enter for fun. During the holidays, Horseland released themed shows (e.g. Halloween, Christmas, Easter, etc.). There was a leaderboard showing the scores of the last 10 people who entered the show.

In December 2008, the "Trail Ride" was introduced. This gave players the ability to actually ride their horse around scenes from the Horseland cartoon and interact with other players, including making friends and chatting restricted to an option of phrases. (shown in the image on the right). Horseland Jr. players could upgrade to the Horseland World game with parental permission.

The Horseland Jr. game was closed in February 2009. Players under 13 were given a "Junior" account in the main Horseland game. Junior accounts were COPPA compliant and could not send or receive private messages or chat freely.

== Horseland Game ==
The original game on the Horseland website was renamed from "Horseland" to "Horseland World" on September 1, 2006, when the Jr. game was launched. It was reverted to "Horseland" in February 2009 when the Jr. game was closed. In the Horseland game, players bought and sold horses, found stables to board their horses at, found a fair trainer, chatted with friends, participated in horse shows, and had a homepage.

There was some controversy among the players after the October 28, 2008 changes. The change in currency from HLD to HLC was one of them. The value of 1 HLC was different from the value of one old HLD, so prices across the game were changed to reflect the new value. Horseland also removed the ability for Basic Players (free accounts) to get free money and players now earned money by playing games.

=== Mods ===
The game also consisted of a group of people who "moderated" the website and took action against players who acted inappropriately or cyber bullied other players. These players had a badge beside their name. Whether the mods were active or not, players had to see their status updates.

=== World ===
The world is the place where players could meet, chat, and roleplay virtually. The world had several different servers to accommodate many players, with a variety of places to explore. There were groups of players who formed a roleplaying subgame within Horseland, creating their own characters and acting as their said characters either in the world or through messages with other players. Everyone was represented in the world by an avatar created when the player signed up. These avatars could be modified somewhat to resemble the player and you could change the hair, eye, and skin color. However, you could not change your avatar's gender. If a player had the money to, they could customize their horses and avatar with a variety of clothing and tack, which could be purchased from the store. (Picture of The World is shown on right.)

=== Shop ===
The "Horseland Outfitters" shop sold tack and clothing to customize player and horse avatars. Tack cost from 800 to 3750 coins, and clothing ranged from 530 to 4000 coins. Players could add multiple items to their cart and buy them all at once. They also sold horses and dogs, plus crates and stalls for them. All animals purchased at the shop were three years old. The price for animals generally ranged from around 200 to 350 coins. Also, shops sold food for the animals at a cost of 95 coins per bag of feed, which contained 100 daily servings.

Screenshot of the "Shop" section in Horseland

=== Points ===
Horseland was an escalating system of gameplay, where players strived to earn as many points as possible, both for their player account as well as their individual horses. Players earned points through the training of their horses or dogs. A single player could own many animals of varying breeds and descriptions. While there was no single point goal for their animals, the players were restricted by the trainable lifespan of their horses and dogs. While a horse or a dog could only participate in show training for a period of time, it could participate in ticket training its whole life. When an animal became too old for show training, it was offered the option of retirement. Most players did not retire their animals, as it created "broken lines" where the horses' or dogs' records were wiped off the Horseland database and could not be seen again. Horses could pass a portion of their earned points to their offspring if they bred before reaching retirement age, and thus an evolving system of gameplay continued through the lineage of the animals that players foster d and maintained.

Screenshot of the "Jumping Show" in Horseland

Points usually took time. The horse or dog was required to have all their checkups completed before they showed.

=== Shows ===
There were 2 types of shows: Jumping Shows and Automatic Shows. Jumping Shows were added to the game in October 2008. Every player could start one show a week. The Jumping shows were Flash-based and interactive. The player maneuvered the horse around a jumping course using the arrow keys and space bar. The player received the points immediately after they finished the course. The owner of a jumping show designed the courses using different jumps and obstacles. The Automatic Shows were not interactive. In Automatic Shows, a player put their horse on the list for a particular show then, overnight, the winners of the show are randomly picked and points are awarded.

=== Training ===
Horseland players could train their animals by "Show Training" or "Ticket Training." Show Training involved players entering their horses or dogs in shows where points were awarded the next day. As their animals gained points, the user also gained "Player Points," which were equal to the number of points the animal gained. However, with every show the animal's health bar decreased, limiting the number of shows a horse or dog could enter.

The other method, Ticket Training, was through the use of tickets that Premium players could purchase at the online store. One training ticket gave a horse or dog 30 points without it affecting the animal's health. These tickets could be used on the player's own animals or the player could choose to sell it as a service to other players. As it was a player-operated service, ticket prices fluctuated depending on the seller. Horse tickets were removed from the game in October 2008 and re-introduced in January 2009.

Some players offered a service referred to as "point training", or training a horse or dog using one of the above methods to "x" number of points for "x" amount of money. Generally, hiring other players to do such a thing was more expensive than doing so personally.

=== Breeding ===
Breeding was an important part of the Horseland World game. Players could extend the capabilities of an animal to earn more points by passing a portion of the points earned by a horse on to their offspring, giving that foal a higher starting point level.

Players could choose to breed among their own horses or with horses owned by others. The owners of the stallions controlled the breeding by having the option to accept or reject a "breed request" by another player. Mares could be bred once every 21 days, and stallions every 2 days (both from the age of 3 until the age of 21).

Breeding was tracked by the game, listing all ancestors of a horse still in play. Once retired, however, the information for that horse (name, age, points, etc.) was lost and the offspring of that horse lost that portion of their lineage, resulting in what is referred to as a "broken line". Most players were very attentive to the tracking of bloodlines, so they often chose to not retire their horses.

==== Different Types of Bloodlines and Breeds ====
Crossbreeds (aka CB) were two different breeds that were bred together.

Overbred (aka OB) meant that the horse/dog had a large number of offspring.

Inbred (aka IB) meant that one horse/dog was in the pedigree more than once.

Broken-Lined (aka BL) meant that the horse/dog's parents, grandparents, great-grandparents, etc., could not be found.

A horse that was either inbred, overbred, or both, was generally frowned upon. A horse or dog was less likely to be bought if this applied to it.

=== Graphics ===
Graphics were modified pictures and "layouts" designed by graphic makers. A layout was usually a manipulated image with the player's name and ID number on it, with text boxes for writing any information about the player and their services. Layouts required knowledge of HTML and photo manipulation, often resulting in large sums of money being paid to the graphic maker. They were a popular way of keeping homepages interesting. They were simple or complex, depending on the player's budget and needs. Graphic makers ranged from beginners who were experimenting with novice programs to more experienced people using programs such as Gimp or Photoshop. People often had layout contests in which they offered a large sum of money, chose the layout they liked best, and paid that person.

=== Economy ===
The economic system in Horseland evolved into a free, open market by players, originally beginning with the buying and selling of horses and items included by the Horseland game system and eventually including services offered by the players themselves, such as homepage design and artwork.

Players used "Coins" to buy most things in the game. Coins could be earned by playing mini-games or purchased with real money. Horseland also offered a "Premium Membership". Premium Players were given a weekly income of 3,500 Coins and access to exclusive features like forum avatars & signatures, featured listings in search results, dog training tickets, themed jumping shows, and the previously standard 100 classes/show.

Though the game itself required players to purchase automated services, such as veterinary visits to maintain the health of their animals. Elective services, such as the boarding of animals in privately owned stables and kennels, were handled by the players themselves.

Horseland allowed players to dictate the price of their services and created a natural division of labor, as some players elected to specialize their gameplay by being "trainers" or "boarders", for example. The ability to have open discussion on the Horseland Forum pages lent itself to players looking for and advertising services offered for players by players and fostered a fluctuating open market.

== Horseland as a social network ==
In addition to being a simulation game, Horseland also had many attributes of a social network. A great deal of Horseland's social network centered around user-generated content. Each player had a homepage that they could alter with HTML or CSS. Players often created and "sold" design codes for homepages, turning the code over to other players in exchange for coins. "Professional" (aka “pro”) photographs and illustrations for horses and dogs were also exchanged between players.

Players could communicate with each other through Flash-based chat rooms, in-game messages, personal blogs, forums, and the Flash-based 3D world. An additional feature of the game was lists of "Friends", which highlighted each friend's last status or activity in the game. Players could send digital cards (sometimes called "Love/Luff Cards") to their friends for occasions like birthdays or holidays.

Unofficial clubs, different from the official Horseland Club, were popular. Players created their own clubs by creating a new account. These clubs were run in a similar way to the official club: they held contests, gathered members, created logos (called "club cards"), and propagated campaigns.

Players could also run campaigns in Horseland official clubs. Becoming the President of a club allowed the player to control which animals were accepted and rejected from the club. The President set their own registry for the club for their term, with each term lasting for one month. Players campaigned to become president by TVing (trading votes) with other Premium players. Players often held voting contests in hopes of luring other players to help them get enough votes. Players could also "buy" votes from other players who did not want to trade their votes. This was sometimes a controversial topic, as players could become presidents simply by bribing other players with a lot of money instead of them voting for a more ideal president.

== See also ==
- List of fictional horses
