= Bring It On: In It to Win It =

- DVD cover
- Directed by: Steve Rash
- Written by: Alyson Fouse; Elena Song
- Produced by: Wayne Morris
- Starring: Ashley Benson; Cassie Scerbo; Jennifer Tisdale
- Cinematography: Levie Isaacks
- Edited by: Tony Lombardo
- Music by: Transcenders
- Production company: Beacon Pictures
- Distributed by: Universal Studios Home Entertainment
- Release date: December 18, 2007
- Running time: 90 minutes
- Country: United States
- Language: English

Bring It On: In It to Win It is a 2007 American teen sports comedy film directed by Steve Rash and written by Alyson Fouse and Elena Song. The fourth installment in the Bring It On film series, it stars Ashley Benson, Cassie Scerbo, and Michael Copon as members of rival cheerleading squads attending a Florida cheer camp.

The film was shot at Universal Orlando Resort in April and May 2007, with members of the University of Central Florida cheerleading squad appearing as cheerleaders and stand-ins. Universal Studios Home Entertainment released it direct-to-video on December 18, 2007. The film generated $24.8 million in domestic DVD sales. It received negative reviews from critics, although later retrospectives have highlighted its overt references to West Side Story.

== Plot ==
The West Coast Sharks Cheerleading Squad, led by Carson, attends Camp Spirit-Thunder, where they're confronted by their arch-rivals, the East Coast Jets Cheerleading Squad, led by Brooke. Both are fierce rivals because each is the best on its respective coast; however, the Jets have beaten the Sharks at the annual Cheer Camp Championships for the previous three years in a row.

On her first day at camp, Carson meets and flirts with Penn. They trade phone numbers, neither knowing the other is on their arch-rival squad. When Carson eventually finds out that Penn is a Jet, she gives him up despite their reciprocated feelings.

As part of the Camp Spirit-Thunder ritual, the West Coast Sharks are given the Spirit Stick, a "special" cheerleading item that they have to guard. Carson agrees to watch the Spirit Stick when her friends leave for a poker game, but she forgets about it when Penn arrives to ask her out. They go to a nearby amusement park and spend time together. At this time, Penn confesses that he tricked his team to raise money for him to go to the camp to prevent his father from finding out he is a cheerleader.

Carson's friends return to her room but find both her and the Spirit Stick missing. They search for her and eventually find her dancing with Penn. At this time, Brooke and her friends also see the duo. When the Sharks reveal that the Spirit Stick is gone, Carson accuses the Jets of sending Penn to lure her away, and she angrily announces Penn's secret to all. The Sharks worry that losing the Spirit Stick means they are "cursed."

The Sharks decide to hold a ceremony to ask the "Cheer Gods" for forgiveness. They are interrupted when the Jets arrive, and the squads have a "cheer-rumble". The authorities arrive, and in the ensuing melee, several members from both teams become injured. Both squads are forced to leave the camp as neither one has enough members to compete. But before they can board their respective buses, Carson suggests to Brooke that they combine into a single squad to compete at the Cheer Camp Championship. Though reluctant at first, the squads come together as the "East-West Coast Shets", complete with new uniforms made through patching their old uniforms together. The two teams slowly bond, while Carson works on repairing her relationship with Penn.

The Shets sneak into Camp Victory, the rival of Camp Spirit-Thunder, to scope Camp Victory's star team, the Flamingos. After seeing their impressive performance, Carson devises a new routine, inspired by the Double Dragon ride at the amusement park. On the day of the competition, the Shets perform their routine perfectly and win the competition outright. Carson and Penn kiss on the mat in the middle of the celebrations, and Vance reveals that Camp Victory is the one responsible for stealing the Spirit Stick.

The end credits feature clips of the cast dancing "all over the world", while Ashley Tisdale performs her single "He Said She Said".

== Cast ==
- Ashley Benson as Carson, the leader of the West Coast Sharks Cheerleading Squad
- Cassie Scerbo as Brooke, the leader of the East Coast Jets Cheerleading Squad
- Michael Copon as Penn, Carson's love interest, a member of the Jets Cheerleading Squad
- Jennifer Tisdale as Chelsea, a member of the Jets Cheerleading Squad
- Anniese Taylor Dendy as Aeysha, a member of the Sharks Cheerleading Squad
- Noel Areizaga as Ruben, a member of the Sharks Cheerleading Squad
- Kierstin Koppel as Sarah, a goth who is a member of the Sharks Cheerleading Squad
- Adam Vernier as Vance
- Tanisha Harris as Chicago
- Jobeth Locklear as Shelby
- Lisa Glaze as Pepper
- Ashley Tisdale as herself

== Production ==
The story was conceived as a loose cheerleading variation on West Side Story, with the opposing teams named the Jets and the Sharks and their rivalry culminating in a “cheer rumble”. Rash and screenwriter Alyson Fouse had also worked on the preceding film, Bring It On: All or Nothing.

=== Casting and training ===
The production held an open casting call for cheerleaders. Six members of the UCF cheerleading squad—Dinah Schierer, Cory Brown, Brian White, Jake Waldrup, Tim Johnson, and Lauren Whitt—joined the film in various roles. According to UCF Athletics, they were hired for their cheerleading ability and appeared as team members or stood in for actors. Some began rehearsing two weeks before filming, learned as many as ten routines, and spent up to 30 days on set.

Scerbo, who had a dance background but had not previously cheered, said that the principal cast completed three weeks of cheerleading training with choreographer Tony Gonzalez. She and Benson learned to perform as flyers and carried out the principal stunt used in the final routine.

=== Filming ===
Principal photography took place at Universal Orlando during April and May 2007. Locations included the Hard Rock Hotel and areas of the Universal theme park. The resort and its attractions are prominent in the finished film; the climactic routine is inspired by the former Dueling Dragons roller coaster. UCF cheerleaders described the production as physically demanding, involving repeated stunting, tumbling, and dancing during long outdoor shooting days.

== Music ==
The original score was composed by the Transcenders. The film also uses contemporary pop, rock, R&B, and hip-hop recordings, including “Conga” by Miami Sound Machine, “Get Me Bodied” by Beyoncé, “Ay Chico (Lengua Afuera)” by Pitbull, and songs by Hilary Duff, JoJo, Aly & AJ, and Superchick. During the closing credits, Ashley Tisdale appears as herself and performs “He Said She Said”.

== Release ==
Universal Studios Home Entertainment released Bring It On: In It to Win It DVD in the United States on December 18, 2007. The disc included seven deleted scenes, a making-of featurette titled “Lights, Camera, Bring It!”, and four instructional segments led by choreographer Tony Gonzalez. ABC Family broadcast the film on January 20, 2008. It grossed $24.8 million in domestic DVD sales.

Universal released the film individually on Blu-ray on July 10, 2018.

== Reception ==
Rotten Tomatoes lists three contemporary critic reviews, all of them negative. David Cornelius of DVD Talk criticized the acting, writing, direction, and cheerleading sequences, describing the film as an “irritating and vacuous” in-name-only sequel. Jay S. Jacobs of PopEntertainment similarly found the story silly, the dialogue poor, and the performances exaggerated; he also wrote that the Universal Orlando setting made the film resemble a feature-length advertisement for the resort. Kevin Carr rated it two out of five stars, criticizing its dialogue and conspicuous West Side Story references.

In a more favorable review for OK!, a staff writer called the plot flimsy and the musical sequences cheesy but praised the cheerleading, particularly a double-flip stunt.

=== Retrospective assessments ===
In a 2015 retrospective on the series' direct-to-video sequels, Entertainment Weekly highlighted the film's West Side Story parallels and described its cheer rumble as “so-bad-it's-good”, while praising the visual symbolism of the combined team's red-and-blue uniforms. That year, LaToya Ferguson of Complex ranked it last among the first five films in the series, criticizing its caricatured characters, romance, and extensive presentation of Universal Orlando. In 2016, Kirsten Howard of Den of Geek called it the strangest sequel in the series and criticized its story as aimless and incoherent.
