= Cassie Scerbo =

American actress, singer and dancer

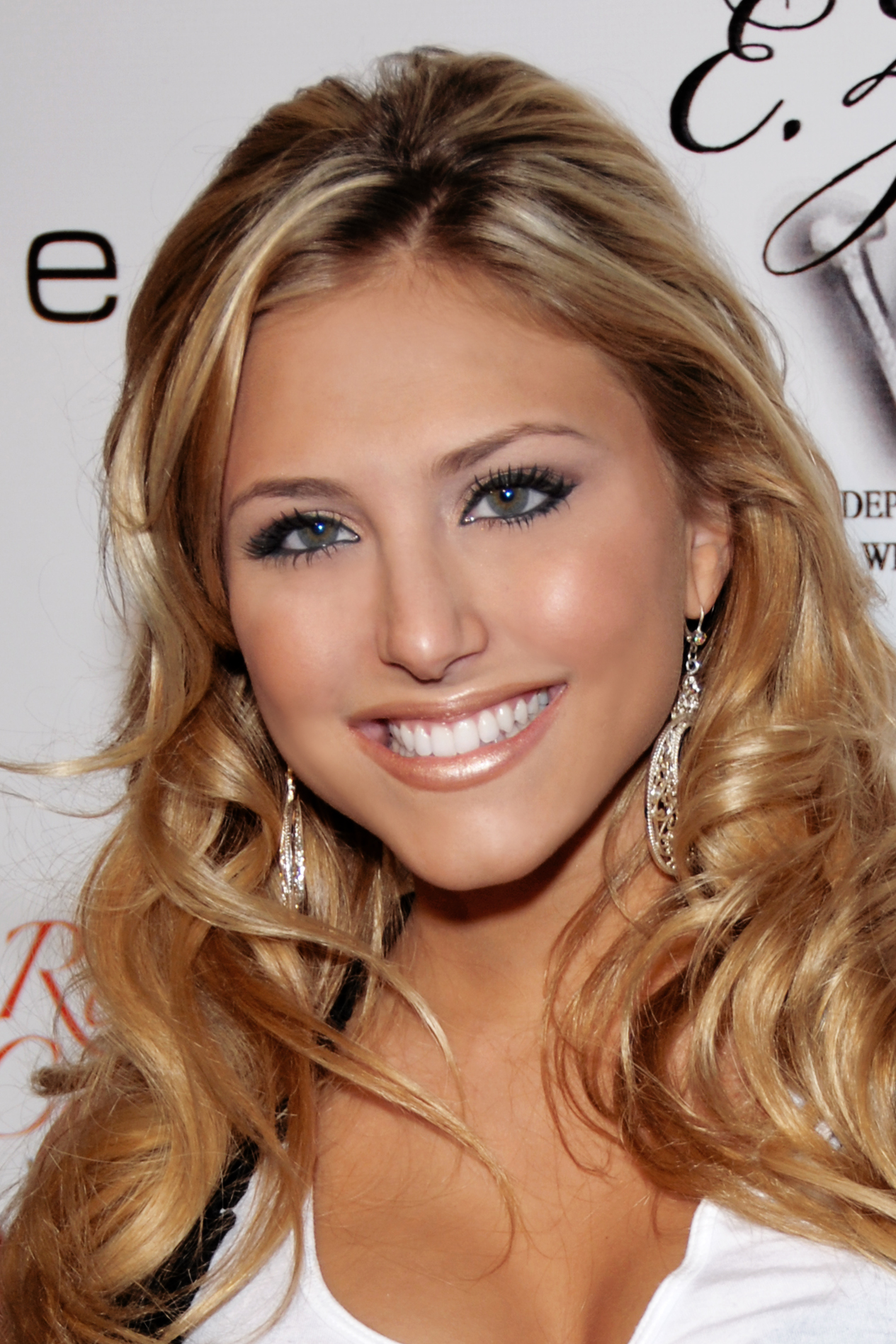
- Scerbo in January 2009
- Born: Long Island, New York, U.S.
- Occupations: Actress, singer, dancer
- Years active: 2005–present
- Website: cassandrascerbo.net

Cassandra Lynn Scerbo is an American actress, singer, and dancer. She was a member of the girl group Slumber Party Girls on the CBS children's music variety series Dance Revolution (2006-2007). As an actress, she starred as Brooke in the film Bring It On: In It to Win It (2007), as Lauren Tanner on the ABC Family comedy series Make It or Break It (2009–2012), as Nova Clarke in the Sharknado film series (2013–2018), and as Jo Beckett in the film The Wolf and the Lamb (2026).

== Life and career ==
Scerbo was born on Long Island, New York. She is of full Italian ancestry. Scerbo was raised in Parkland, Florida and played soccer for the Parkland Soccer Club. She attended Marjory Stoneman Douglas High School in Parkland. She lived in Florida from the time she was in kindergarten until she was cast in Make It or Break It.

In 2006, Scerbo successfully auditioned for the music girl group Slumber Party Girls. Scerbo was chosen as 1 of the 5 members out of over 1,000 applicants. In September 2006, the group hosted the children's music variety series Dance Revolution, which promoted nutrition and fitness to children. Slumber Party Girls' original songs were dominantly featured throughout the series' run. The group's debut album Dance Revolution was released, but the series was not renewed for a second season. In mid-2007, as they began working on their second album, the group was confirmed to have split. That same year, Scerbo signed a solo-recording contract with Geffen Records. Her original songs "Betcha Don't Know", "Sugar and Spice", and "Top Of The World" were released on iTunes in 2008.

In 2007, Universal Pictures green-lit a fourth installment of the Bring It On film series with Scerbo confirmed to star. In the film, entitled Bring It On: In It to Win It, Scerbo portrayed the lead role of Brooke, the team captain of the East Coast Jets Cheerleading squad, which won three years in a row at Camp Spirit-Thunder. It was released on December 18, 2007. That same year, Scerbo starred on the Disney Channel television pilot Arwin!. The pilot was filmed in late 2006, but was not picked up by the Disney Channel.

In September 2008, Scerbo starred in the comedy film Soccer Mom, alongside Missi Pyle and Emily Osment.

In June 2009, Scerbo was cast in the ABC Family teen comedy series Make It or Break It, which premiered to 2.5 million viewers. Scerbo portrayed the role of skilled gymnast Lauren Tanner, who aspires to make it to the Olympic Games. Due to the series' success, ABC Family ordered an additional 10-episodes on July 27, 2009, bringing the first season episode count to 20 episodes. In January 2010, the show was renewed for a second season, which premiered on June 28, 2010. The series was renewed for a third season on September 16, 2011, which premiered on March 26, 2012. On April 26, 2012, it was announced that the third season would be the final season. The series finale aired on May 14, 2012.

In April 2010, Scerbo appeared with her Make It or Break It castmate Chelsea Hobbs on an episode of CSI: Miami entitled "Spring Breakdown". The episode aired on April 12, 2010.

In April 2010, Scerbo guest-starred on an episode of 10 Things I Hate About You, playing her character Lauren Tanner from Make It or Break It. The episode, entitled "The Winner Takes It All", aired on April 26, 2010.

In 2011, Scerbo starred in the ABC Family original film Teen Spirit. She portrayed the role of Amber Pollock. the Queen Bee of the high school, who is electrified to death and not allowed to enter Heaven unless she helps the school's most unpopular girl become prom queen. Filming took place in Wilmington, North Carolina. The film premiered on August 7, 2011 on ABC Family.

In August 2012, Scerbo announced that she is the godmother to Tiffany Thornton's son.

In December 2012, Scerbo guest-starred on an episode of Hot in Cleveland, acting opposite Valerie Bertinelli, Jane Leeves, Wendie Malick, and Betty White. The episode, entitled "Method Man", aired on December 12, 2012.

In 2013, Scerbo starred in the Syfy original film Sharknado as bartender Nova Clarke. She reprised her role in the third installment Sharknado 3: Oh Hell No! in 2015, the fifth installment Sharknado 5: Global Swarming in 2017, and the final installment The Last Sharknado: It's About Time in 2018, in which her character has become a hardened sharknado fighter.

In 2026, Scerbo starred as Jo Beckett in the film The Wolf and the Lamb.

== Filmography ==
=== Film ===
Year	Title	Role	Notes
2005	Hitters Anonymous	Young Leah	
2007	Natural Born Komics	Montana	
2007	Bring It On: In It to Win It	Brooke	Direct-to-video film
2008	Soccer Mom	Tiffany	
2011	A Holiday Heist	Kate	
2011	Not Another Not Another Movie	Ursula	
2012	Music High	Candi Piper	
2012	Just Yell Fire: Campus Life	Herself	Short documentary
2013	Isolated	Ambassador for Peace	
2013	Not Today	Audry	
2015	Take a Chance	Cynthia	
2015	Agoraphobia	Faye	
2026	The Wolf and the Lamb	Josephine 'Jo' Beckett	

=== Television ===
Year	Title	Role	Notes
2006	House Broken	Cassie	Television film
2006–2007	Dance Revolution	Slumber Party Girl	Main role
2008	Mother Goose Parade	Herself	Television film
2009–2012	Make It or Break It	Lauren Tanner	Main role
2010	10 Things I Hate About You	Lauren Tanner	Episode: "The Winner Takes It All"
2010	CSI: Miami	Hilary Swanson	Episode: "Spring Breakdown"
2010	Sym-Bionic Titan	Kimmy / Tiffany	Voice role; episode: "Showdown at Sherman High"
2011	Teen Spirit	Amber Pollock	Television film (ABC Family)
2012	Hot in Cleveland	Lindsay	Episode: "Method Man"
2012–2015	Randy Cunningham: 9th Grade Ninja	Heidi Wienerman/Additional Voices	Recurring voice role
2013	Sharknado	Nova	Television film (Syfy)
2013	Bering Sea Beast	Donna	Television film (Syfy)
2014	Baby Daddy	Heather	Episodes: "Romancing the Phone" and "The Bet"
2015	My Life as a Dead Girl	Brittany Smith / Chelsea White	Television film
2015	Sharknado 3: Oh Hell No!	Nova Clarke	Television film (Syfy)
2017	The Perfect Soulmate	Lee Maxson	Television film (Lifetime)
2017	Sharknado 5: Global Swarming	Nova Clarke	Television film (Syfy)
2017	Truth or Dare	Alex Colshis	Television film (Syfy)
2018	The Last Sharknado: It's About Time	Nova Clarke	Television film (Syfy)
2019	The Filth	Diane	Episode: "Filthy Day Jobs"
2019	Grand Hotel	Vanessa	3 episodes
2020	9-1-1: Lone Star	Cheyenne	Episode: "Studs"

=== Albums ===
- 2006: Dance Revolution
