= Sushi Pack =

American-Canadian children's cartoon series

- The show's title card
- Genre: Action; Adventure; Comedy; Superhero
- Created by: Studio Espinosa
- Developed by: Tom Ruegger; Nicholas Hollander
- Written by: Tom Ruegger; Nicholas Hollander
- Directed by: Walt Kubiak
- Starring: Rick Adams; Tara Strong; Andrew Francis; Chiara Zanni; Scott McNeil
- Theme music composer: Phofo (Season 1); Ron Wasserman (Season 2)
- Opening theme: "Sushi Pack"
- Composer: Phofo
- Countries of origin: United States; Canada
- Original language: English
- No. of seasons: 2
- No. of episodes: 26 (52 segments)

Production
- Executive producers: Andy Heyward; Michael Maliani; Jeffrey Conrad; Sean Gorman; Ryan Wiesbrock
- Producers: J.C. Cheng; Jim E. Lara
- Editor: James Hereth
- Running time: 22 minutes (11 minutes per episode)
- Production companies: Studio Espinosa; Tom Ruegger Productions; CloudCo, Inc.; The Hatchery; Studio 352 S.A (post-production); American Greetings; American Greetings Properties; DIC Entertainment Corporation (Note: Animation outsourced to Suzhou Hong Yang Cartoon Company Limited.)

Original release
- Network: CBS (KEWLopolis)
- Release: November 3, 2007 – February 28, 2009

Sushi Pack is an animated action-adventure television series created by Studio Espinosa and developed by Tom Ruegger and Nicholas Hollander. Produced by DIC Entertainment Corporation and CloudCo, Inc. the show aired for two seasons and 26 episodes comprising 52 segments on the KEWLopolis programming block of CBS from November 3, 2007 to February 28, 2009.

This show, along with DinoSquad and Horseland, were the final three series produced by DIC before their acquisition with Cookie Jar Entertainment, who produced the second and final season of Sushi Pack until the series ended its run in 2009. Cookie Jar (along with most of the DiC library) would be acquired by DHX Media (which is now known as WildBrain) in 2012.

== Premise ==
The series centres on a fictional superhero team of anthropomorphic remains of sushi and/or common sushi ingredients (octopus, tuna, salmon, crab, and wasabi) that had become sentient after getting hit by a lightning storm. They use their "wits and powers" to save the world from dastardly villains. Morals featured throughout the series involve learning about friendship, cooperation skills, and teamwork.

== Characters ==
=== Sushi Pack ===
- Tako Maki (voiced by Rick Adams): A blue octopus who is the self-proclaimed leader of the team, he has six long tentacle arms, wears an eye patch, and speaks with a British accent. While he is part of the team, he not only uses his powers of shooting multi-colored ink to fight evil, but also to become a world-renowned painter.
- Maguro Maki (voiced by Tara Strong): A purple tuna who is the backbone and spiritual guru of the team, she possesses the ability to concentrate intensely, resulting in her gaining psychic powers, including levitation, mind-reading, telekinesis and getting "in tune with her inner tuna". She is also friends with Mochi Macchiato, despite them being on opposites sides of good and evil.
- Kani Maki (voiced by Chiara Zanni): A tomboyish, grumpy, and brainy reddish-pink crab whose pigtails are tough crab claws, which she uses to give her foes powerful pinches. She is frequently sarcastic and often claims that other people are making her "crabby". Despite that, she has her fair share of kindness and usually acts as a mechanic/engineer of the team. She also seems to be interested in geology.
- Ikura Maki (voiced by Andrew Francis): An orange salmon who is impulsive, headstrong, and competitive, he tends to jump into action and get ahead of himself without thinking, which causes tension between him and the pack. He has the power to shoot sticky fish eggs from his hands. Ikura also has a fear of bears, including those that don't harm him such as gummy bears.
- Wasabi Pow (voiced by Scott McNeil): A yellowish-green wasabi creature who is the smallest and youngest member of the Sushi Pack, as well as the powerhouse and the only speechless member of the team. As a spicy ball of hot mustard, unlike the rest of the team, he speaks hot sauce and only communicates with unintelligible squeaky noises and babbles. But despite this, his teammates have no trouble understanding him. He also has the power to shoot fireballs at his foes. He is the only one able to stand high temperatures as the Sushi Pack's weakness is heat.

=== Legion of Low Tide ===
- Titanium Chef (voiced by Adam Behr): A sushi chef catfish who not only orders the Legion of Low Tide to fight dirty and scheme evil plots, but also manages the sushi bar they live in, mostly using the Book of Chum Chop, which might be inspired by the Necronomicon. He is often rude, and demeaning to the legion of lowtide members even when they want to help with his schemes.
- Fugu (voiced by Scott McNeil): A blowfish who can puff himself up to many times his original size, he mostly acts as the leader of the team like Tako. He has an eye that also functions as a camera, implying that he may be a cyborg.
- Toro (voiced by Vincent Tong): A fatty tuna who is not very smart, he acts as powerhouse of the team like Wasabi, and is strong but gullible, he usually ends up following the lead of others. He is also kind, as seen in the episode "The Sign of Tuna".
- Uni (voiced by Samuel Vincent): An unstoppable sea urchin with a talent for shapeshifting into objects and people, he is one of the Sushi Pack's biggest threats, due to being unpredictable. He speaks with a Jamaican accent.
- Unagi (voiced by Brian Dobson): A mutated electric eel and slimy savage with an eye for detail and possessing the ability of electrokinesis, he and Fugu argue and seem to fight over who gets to be leader sometimes. He helps the Sushi Pack on occasion.
- Mochi Macchiato (voiced by Jeannie Elias): A mochi ice cream creature who freezes her enemies in their tracks, she is candy coated but cold as ice, as she can freeze anything she touches. She is a bit of a klutz and is very girly, loving dress-up and pop music. She befriends Maguro and later Kani in "Deep Freeze".

=== Other characters ===
- Ben (voiced by Samuel Vincent): A close friend of the Sushi Pack, as well as the manager of the vegan doughnut shop where they live, he always gives them advice or suggestions.
- Mayor Hack Martin: The mayor of Wharf City who calls on the Sushi Pack during emergencies.
- Jenny Flume: The chief of police who usually has something she would rather be doing than talking to the Sushi Pack, such as going to the movies or playing golf with Mayor Martin.
- Satel-Lightning (voiced by Michael Daingerfield): A mechanical monster created via fusion of a meteor and satellite, he is initially hostile, but ultimately becomes a friend of the Sushi Pack. He is later seen giving advice to them about teamwork in the episode "In Hot Water" while being stuck in a crack in the ocean floor.
- Hideki (voiced by Maryke Hendrikse): Tako's cousin, who is a purple squid, she is very kind and sweet towards the pack. In "Deep Sea Diver Dude" Hideki spent years trying to find Tako, and when she does, she invites Tako to a family reunion. The rest of the sushi pack are suspicious and almost ruin the reunion, but at the end it was a misunderstanding, and they are happy for Tako for finding his long lost family, and become honorary octopuses to his family.
- Pipin' Hot: A formerly evil piece of cookie dough with an egg beater stuck in his head, he was created by Ben. At the end of "Dough-Ray-Me" he seems to become friendly and reformed, working on a farm milking cows with other cookie dough creatures.
- Sophia Tucker: A reporter who often appears on the news, making comments about the sushi pack, events and other jaw-dropping news.
- Cataplatopus: A weird mutant hybrid with cybernetics, he has an Australian accent and says the phrase "Meow-Quack!" often, and was also Ben's favorite hero when he was a child. He is egotistical and is afraid of mice.
- Insecto: Another hero, a cross between a fly and a bumblebee, and self proclaimed "King Of All Insects", his weakness is honey and he speaks in a high-pitched voice.
- The Prom Princess of Power: A prom-themed superheroine with the flower power of invisibility, but can lose the powers if her flower on her chest wilts. She is married to Fantastic Fellow and often proclaims as the most "coolest, most powerful and cutest hero of all!".
- Fantastic Fellow & Gastro: A superhero with the strength of ten men, but his weakness is turkey gobbling. He is married to The Prom Princess of Power. His dog, Gastro, is an old raspy dog with a heart of gold, and loves him a lot.
- Murphey Pilbean: The art museum's director, an eccentric and kind old man with a love of art, but he does not like Tako's art very much.

=== Villains ===
- Apex (voiced by Scott McNeil): A four-armed alien with the ability to disguise himself.
- The Collector: A man who collects anything he can get his hands on.
- Sir Darkly: A wraith whose goal is to spread misery.
- Oleandar: A purple woman who runs a cooking show and wants to eat the Sushi Pack.
- Hot Squad: Three chili peppers who want to make the planet a hot place.
- Paradoxtor: A anthropometric Ox scientist.
- Baron Von Loudly (voiced by Peter New)
- Trashasarus
- General Anesthetic
- Jimmy Sweet Tooth (voiced by Samuel Vincent): A little person who masquerades as a kid to sell sugar-loaded snacks.
- Dr. Naught: A mad scientist.
- An Egomanical Frozen Pea

== Episodes ==
Season	Episodes	Segments	Originally released	
Season	Episodes	Segments	First released	Last released
1	13	26	November 3, 2007	February 23, 2008
2	13	26	September 13, 2008	February 28, 2009

=== Season 1 (2007–08) ===
No. overall	No. in season	Title	Original release date	Prod. code	K6–11 rating/share
1	1	"But is it Art?"	November 3, 2007	BZ010–101A	0.5/2
1	1	"Wassup Wasabi?"	November 3, 2007	BZ010–101B	0.5/2
But is it Art?: The famous paintings from the museum — Boo Boy, Groaning Pizza, Whistler's Goat and The Shrieker — are stolen and have come to life by The Collector, except for Tako's paintings. Wassup Wasabi?: Wasabi gets teased by his teammates to the point of running off crying and getting kidnapped by the Legion of Low Tide.
2	2	"No Clowning Around"	November 10, 2007	BZ010–102A	0.4/2
2	2	"World's Tastiest Heroes"	November 10, 2007	BZ010–102B	0.4/2
No Clowning Around: Sir Darkly is walking past the people in Wharf City and making a storm by collecting tears from everyone he meets in Wharf City. World's Tastiest Heroes: The Pack must save the day when the Superheroes from their favorite reality TV show are captured by an invading alien called Apex.
3	3	"Go With the Glow"	November 17, 2007	BZ010–103B	N/A
3	3	"Poached Salmon"	November 17, 2007	BZ010–103A	N/A
Go With the Glow: Maguro and Tako's bickering over the importance of art vs. meditation prevents them from stopping the Low Tide from causing a city-wide brown out. Poached Salmon: Ikura's impulsiveness causes the Sushi Pack to get caught up in a trap set by the evil gourmet Oleander.
4	4	"Deep Freeze"	November 24, 2007	BZ010–104A	N/A
4	4	"Satel Lightning"	November 24, 2007	BZ010–104B	N/A
Deep Freeze: Maguro befriends Mochi Mochiato, to which rest of the Pack challenge the Legion of Low Tide to an epic showdown in order to settle it once and for all. Satel Lightning: After an asteroid hits a satellite, it merges and becomes a robot monster. The Pack must decide what to do and how to save the day.
5	5	"Red Hot Chili Planet"	December 1, 2007	BZ010–105A	0.1/0
5	5	"Sweet Tooth"	December 1, 2007	BZ010–105B	0.1/0
Red Hot Chilli Planet: After seeing a global warming video, The Sushi Pack end up meeting a group of heroes named the Hot Squad. Now they must stop this squad from turning up the heat and destroying the world. Sweet Tooth: After eating excessive amounts of Jimmy's candy, Wasabi becomes addicted and overweight, resulting in the Pack training Wasabi back into shape.
6	6	"Taming the Gaming" "Taming the Game"	December 8, 2007	BZ010–106A	0.3/1
6	6	"Rex Marks the Spot"	December 8, 2007	BZ010–106B	0.3/1
Taming the Gaming: Tako jeopardizes a mission when he becomes addicted to video games. Rex Marks the Spot: When Tako doesn't get a comic book ring from Ben, he becomes jealous and loses a mission for the Pack.
7	7	"When Will Ben Be Zen?"	December 15, 2007	BZ010–107A	0.1/0
7	7	"Wharf City on the Half-Shell"	December 15, 2007	BZ010–107B	0.1/0
When Will Ben Be Zen?: When a health inspector attempts to close down Ben's donut shop, Ben tries to prove his worth to the Pack by keeping his shop open. Wharf City on the Half-Shell: A giant space clam attacks the city and it's up to the Sushi Pack to save the day.
8	8	"Dough Ray Me"	December 22, 2007	BZ010–108A	N/A
8	8	"Sign of the Tuna"	December 22, 2007	BZ010–108B	N/A
Dough Ray Me: After Ikura leaves for family matters, the Sushi Pack must defend Wharf City from mutant cookies in search of the "White Treasure". Sign of the Tuna: Toro gets injured in a fight and Maguro decides that it would be a good idea to have him stay in the secret hideout.
9	9	"The Yam Yakkers"	December 29, 2007	BZ010–109A	N/A
9	9	"Dungeon of the Crab"	December 29, 2007	BZ010–109B	N/A
The Yam Yakkers: Sir Darkly, Oleander, and the Titanium Chef become an evil group known as the Yam Yakkers. While the Sushi Pack try and stop their evil plans, Ikura and Wasabi focus all their energy on seeing the new Aquabot-Boy movie. Dungeon of the Crab: When a pearl is stolen from a science museum, the Pack split into two squads and get lost in a dungeon.
10	10	"Deep Sea Diver Dude"	February 2, 2008	BZ010–110A	0.4/2
10	10	"Fish Tales"	February 2, 2008	BZ010–110B	0.4/2
Deep Sea Diver Dude: Feeling upset that he has no family, Tako wallows in his self-pity. All of a sudden, he receives a mysterious invitation in the mail. Fish Tales: When Wasabi accidentally overhears Kani talking to Ikura about going to beach because she is molting, he misunderstands the situation.
11	11	"The Thing That Wasn't There"	February 9, 2008	BZ010–111A	N/A
11	11	"Starring Ikura"	February 9, 2008	BZ010–111B	N/A
The Thing That Wasn't There: Maguro loses trust in the Pack when they don't believe that she sees a monster attacking the city. Starring Ikura: When Ikura accidentally stars in a hit television show, the fame goes to his head.
12	12	"Give Peas a Chance"	February 16, 2008	BZ010–112A	0.3/1
12	12	"Chemicals Made From Dirt"	February 16, 2008	BZ010–112B	0.3/1
Give Peas a Chance: Ben gets stressed out over a big donut order and takes his anger out on Wasabi, hurting his feelings. This jeopardizes the Sushi Pack's mission where they must stop an army of evil frozen vegetables from freezing the city. Chemicals Made from Dirt: Titanium Chef makes a shoe cleaner that causes everyone to feel extremely cold. The Sushi Pack must then find a way to save the day.
13	13	"So Says Who?"	February 23, 2008	BZ010–113A	0.4/2
13	13	"Darkness and Spice"	February 23, 2008	BZ010–113B	0.4/2
So Says Who?: Tako and Maguro have different views on who screwed up an important mission. Now the Sushi Pack have to figure out exactly what happened in order to fix it. Darkness and Spice: Wasabi's fear of the dark causes problems for the Pack when they try to capture Uni at an amusement park.

=== Season 2 (2008–09) ===
No. overall	No. in season	Title	Original release date	Prod. code	K6–11 rating/share
14	1	"Disoriented on the Sushi Express"	September 13, 2008	BZ010–115A	0.4/2
14	1	"Ring-A-Ding-Ding"	September 13, 2008	BZ010–115B	0.4/2
Disoriented on the Sushi Express: Ikura jumps to a conclusion where he can't find his rare action figure. Ring-A-Ding-Ding: Kani wants to change her crabby ways when she is invited to be in a wedding.
15	2	"Near Miss"	September 20, 2008	BZ010–116A	0.5/2
15	2	"Mirror Schmirror"	September 20, 2008	BZ010–116B	0.5/2
Near Miss: Paradoxter returns with a plan to defeat the Sushi Pack once and for all. Mirror Schmirror: The Titanium Chef traps the Sushi Pack and sends them to a parallel universe where everything there is the exact opposite.
16	3	"Collect 'Em All"	September 27, 2008	BZ010–117A	N/A
16	3	"Jig-Saw Sushi"	September 27, 2008	BZ010–117B	N/A
Collect 'Em All: The Sushi Pack must make it through the Collector's obstacle course without cheating. Jig-Saw Sushi: Baron Von Loudly tries to catch the Sushi Pack for his collection of unique animals.
17	4	"Sushis of a Certain Stature" "Sushi of a Certain Stature"	October 4, 2008	BZ010–123A	N/A
17	4	"A Very Big Deal"	October 4, 2008	BZ010–123B	N/A
Sushis of a Certain Stature: Apex exploits the Sushi Pack's frustration about a statue of Kato Platypus as an opportunity to take over Wharf City. A Very Big Deal: Tired of being sushi-sized, Ikura inadvertently gets his wish when Dr. Naught's malfunctioning shrink ray turns him into a giant.
18	5	"Sushi Pack vs. The Fried Food Fighting Force"	November 8, 2008	BZ010–126A	0.4/2
18	5	"Every Body is Some Body"	November 8, 2008	BZ010–126B	0.4/2
Sushi Pack vs. The Fried Food Fighting Force: Oleander fries up her own pint-sized warriors to fight the Sushi Pack. Every Body is Some Body: An accident with some of Dr. Naught's magic dust causes Wasabi and Mayor Martin to switch bodies.
19	6	"Pants on Fire"	November 15, 2008	BZ010–121A	0.4/2
19	6	"The Wrong Sushi"	November 15, 2008	BZ010–121B	0.4/2
Pants on Fire: Unagi unleashes a supercharged lightning bolt against Wharf City, but it endows the Sushi Pack with new powers. The Wrong Sushi: The Sushi Pack were framed for a crime they didn't commit, right before the big basketball play-off.
20	7	"Respectable Delectables"	November 22, 2008	BZ010–122A	0.3/1
20	7	"Star Of Light, Star so Bright" "Star Light, Star So Bright"	November 22, 2008	BZ010–122B	0.3/1
Respectable Delectables: Apex assembles a supervillain team to help him get rid of the Sushi Pack. Star of Light, Star so Bright: Since Wasabi glows in the dark, Tako calls on him for training exercises.
21	8	"Ben's Law"	November 29, 2008	BZ010–114A	N/A
21	8	"Where No Truth Lies"	November 29, 2008	BZ010–114B	N/A
Ben's Law: Ben and the Sushi Pack ended up being shipwrecked while on a cruise trip. Where No Truth Lies: Mayor Martin's collection of bottle caps were stolen by the Prevaricator and the Sushi Pack are having trouble getting them back, because Tako lied to Maguro.
22	9	"Donut Whodunnit"	January 31, 2009	BZ010–118A	0.1/1
22	9	"Sushis at the Center of the Earth"	January 31, 2009	BZ010–118B	0.1/1
Donut Whodunit: Each member of the team contributes to search for Ben. Sushis at the Center of the Earth: Tako relinquishes his status as leader so Wasabi can cool down the Lava King.
23	10	"Disappearing Act"	February 7, 2009	BZ010–119A	0.3/1
23	10	"Wicked Waste Wisps"	February 7, 2009	BZ010–119B	0.3/1
Disappearing Act: To track down Jimmy Sweet Tooth's robbing holographic images, Kani pulls out an all-nighter fueled by jelly beans. Wicked Waste Wisps: Sir Darkly creates the wisps of waste, spirits that influence Wharf City citizens to litter excessively.
24	11	"From the Planet Citrus"	February 14, 2009	BZ010–120A	0.4/2
24	11	"Lights On, Lights Off"	February 14, 2009	BZ010–120B	0.4/2
From the Planet Citrus: The Titanium Chef's idea to embarrass the Sushi Pack is unnecessary when the team puts off preparing for a meeting with an alien delegation. Lights On, Lights Off: Mayor Martin's Night of a Thousand Lights celebration overworks a power station and plunges the city into darkness.
25	12	"In Hot Water"	February 21, 2009	BZ010–124A	0.3/1
25	12	"Much Ado About Tako"	February 21, 2009	BZ010–124B	0.3/1
In Hot Water: When the satellite falls from orbit and lands into the ocean, it reminds the bickering Sushi Pack to work together as a team. Much Ado About Tako: Tako is unable to share his duties with his teammates while investigating the mysterious disappearance of everything in Wharf City.
26	13	"Sushi Roll Model"	February 28, 2009	BZ010–125A	0.2/1
26	13	"Fair Share, For Sure"	February 28, 2009	BZ010–125B	0.2/1
Sushi Roll Model: Ikura outwits a manipulative gossip columnist in order to restore his good name. Fair Share, For Sure: The Sushi Pack are having a hard time sharing with the new goodies they bought at the mall and learning to settle their disagreements.

== Reception ==
Emily Ashby of Common Sense Media gave the show a rate three stars out of five, saying that "crime-fighting bento box serves up positive messages".
