= Radio KOL =

- Running time: 240 minutes
- Country of origin: United States
- Language: English
- Home station: KOL
- Hosted by: Rick Adams
- Recording studio: Dulles, Virginia
- Original release: September 2003 – November 28, 2007
- Website: Radio KOL

Radio KOL was a children's radio show aired by KOL (Kids Online), the children's platform of AOL, from 2003 to 2007. The show, hosted by Rick Adams, aired live from 3 to 7 p.m. Eastern Time on weekdays and was then aired on a loop until the next live episode. At its peak, Radio KOL had over 1,000,000 listeners.

In September 2003, AOL relaunched its service for children, previously known as the Kids Only Channel, as KOL and started a radio show hosted by Rick Adams. Adams, who had previously worked in the UK for Children's BBC and as host of Channel 4's The Big Breakfast, moved from the UK to Washington, D.C., to serve as host of the program aired from AOL headquarters in Dulles, Virginia. The program featured contemporary music suitable for children as well as interviews with guests, who played the "Moo Baa" game—guessing whether a breed was a cow or sheep and bleating or mooing accordingly.

By July 2004, Radio KOL had a million listeners aged 6 through 14. Adams received 5,000 emails a day as well as up to 400 instant messages while on the air. It also had two pets—sugar gliders named Ariel and Kiki.

The program featured humor aimed toward kids; for instance, Adams called parents "wrinklies". In 2005, a week of episodes was hosted from Walt Disney World, and Adams interviewed Hilary Duff and Mickey Mouse among other guests.

On November 25, 2007, DJ Rick announced AOL would be canceling Radio KOL. Three days later, on November 28, Radio KOL presented its final show. AOL shut down the remaining stream of the archived Radio KOL broadcasts on February 13, 2008.
