= Slumber Party Girls =

American pop band

The Slumber Party Girls
- Origin: Valencia, California, United States
- Genres: Teen pop
- Years active: 2006–2007
- Label: Geffen Records
- Past members: Caroline Scott; Cassandra Scerbo; Karla Deras; Lina Carattini; Mallory Low
- Website: http://myspace.com/slumberpartygirlsofficial

The Slumber Party Girls (also known as SPG) were an American teen pop girl group formed in 2006. Their debut album, Dance Revolution, was released on October 3, 2006. During the 2006–2007 television season, SPG hosted the KOL Secret Slumber Party every weekend on CBS. They also featured on the show, Dance Revolution, where they served as the show's house band; the program was hosted by Radio KOL's DJ Rick.

== History ==
The Slumber Party Girls was formed in July 2006 by Ron Fair, a music producer who is known for turning out popular music artists Christina Aguilera, Vanessa Carlton, the Black Eyed Peas, Fergie, and the Pussycat Dolls to fame. Scott, Scerbo, Deras, Carattini and Low were chosen out of 1,000 girls who auditioned.

=== Career ===
After the group lineup was finalized, the group started production on their debut album. After the album was finished, they released an EP called Meet the Slumber Party Girls on September 12, 2006. On September 16, 2006, the CBS weekend programming lineup KOL Secret Slumber Party premiered, featuring the Slumber Party Girls promoting healthy eating and fitness between segments. "The Slumber Party Girls Theme" is served as the lineup's theme song. The dance competition show Dance Revolution also premiered as part of the lineup and had the Slumber Party Girls as its house band. Each week, they would perform a song off their debut album Dance Revolution, which was released on October 3, 2006. The day of the album's release, the Slumber Party Girls made a guest appearance on the CBS morning talk show The Early Show to promote the album and perform "Countdown". The group also spoke of a made-for-TV movie and a television series featuring them were in development and slated to premiere in 2007. To further promotion, the Slumber Party Girls shot music videos, for "Dance With Me", "The Texting Song", "Salsa", "Summer's Gone", "Make a Wish", "My Life", "I Got Your Back", "Carousel", "Back to Basics", "Good Times", "Eavesdroppin'", "Countdown" and "Bubblegum". However, despite heavy promotion, the album failed to chart on the Billboard 200 chart and as a result the album was a commercial flop.

In 2007, the Slumber Party Girls started recording their second album, which was rumored to be titled SPG and released towards the end of 2007. Unfortunately, there was rumored disputes between Low and Deras about dating Cake cast member Keegan McFadden, which were thought to lead to the group's break-up that summer. As a result, their made-for-TV movie, television series and second album were canceled. After their break-up, they also went to pursue solo projects. Even though they disbanded, KOL Secret Slumber Party continued to air until its final broadcast on September 8, 2007, and their two songs "Summer's Gone" and "My Life" were featured in the film Bratz.

=== Post-breakup ===
Scerbo launched an acting career starring in the hit television show Make It or Break It and signed a solo recording contract with Geffen Records. Her songs "Betcha Didn't Know", "Sugar and Spice" and "Top of the World" were released throughout 2008 to iTunes. Low also launched an acting career, starring in the interactive short series Hampton High Revealed and having a recurring role in the hit ABC Family television series Lincoln Heights. Deras now studies manufacturing and merchandising in the fashion business at FIDM and has a popular style blog, Karla's Closet.

== Discography ==
=== Albums ===
Album Info
Dance Revolution
- Released: October 3, 2006 (U.S.)
- Chart positions: did not chart
- RIAA certification: N/A
- U.S. sales: N/A
- Official Singles:
  - "My Life"

=== Extended plays ===
Album Info
Meet the Slumber Party Girls
- Released: September 15, 2006 (iTunes), September 12, 2006 (Audio CD) (U.S.)
- Chart positions: did not chart
- RIAA certification: N/A
- U.S. sales: N/A
