= Dance Revolution =

American dance competition TV series

- DJ Rick with the Slumber Party Girls
- Created by: Konami; DIC Entertainment
- Based on: Dance Dance Revolution by Konami
- Developed by: DIC Entertainment; Konami; Brookwell McNamara Entertainment
- Written by: John Doyle; Susie Singer Carter; Don Priess
- Directed by: Keegan Martin
- Presented by: Rick Adams
- Starring: Slumber Party Girls: Caroline Scott; Cassie Scerbo; Karla Deras; Carolina Carattini; Mallory Low
- Country of origin: United States
- Original language: English
- No. of seasons: 1
- No. of episodes: 13

Production
- Executive producers: Andy Heyward; Michael Maliani; Sean McNamara; David Brookwell; Geoff Mulligan; Susie Singer Carter; Don Priess; Jeff Phillips
- Producers: Pixie Wespiser; Kim Morgan Greene; Brad La Fever
- Running time: 22 minutes
- Production companies: Brookwell McNamara Entertainment; Konami; KOL/AOL for Kids; DIC Entertainment

Original release
- Network: CBS
- Release: September 16, 2006 – March 10, 2007

Dance Revolution is a television series from CBS and DIC Entertainment, in association with Konami, produced by Brookwell McNamara Entertainment and CBS Television) (Sean McNamara and David Brookwell), and based on the video game series Dance Dance Revolution.

The series premiered on September 16, 2006, as part of KOL Secret Slumber Party on CBS. The entire series had a focus on promoting fitness and health to children. The series, however, was not renewed after its first season. Its last broadcast was on September 8, 2007.

Dance Revolution was taped at Raleigh Studios in Hollywood, California.

== Synopsis ==
Dance Revolution was hosted by London-based DJ Rick (a.k.a. Rick Adams) and pop group Slumber Party Girls (Caroline Scott, Cassie Scerbo, Karla Deras, Carolina Carattini and Mallory Low).

Every half-hour episode began with music from the house band, the Slumber Party Girls. Then DJ Rick would introduce the "Dance Crews" (the teams of contestants) and the judges. The Dance Crews would then start to perform their own dance routines. When they were finished, choreographer Leah Lynette would come to teach the Dance Crews some new styles of dancing. Finally, the Dance Crews would have a dance off. The judges would then declare who the winning Dance Crew was and the winners would move on to the next round, leading up to the finale, which awarded $25,000 scholarship to the winner. Although Dance Revolution was inspired by the video game series Dance Dance Revolution, there is nothing similar between the two except for the name.

== Development ==
During the show's planning stages, the series was entitled Dance! Dance! Dance!.
