= X-Men in television =

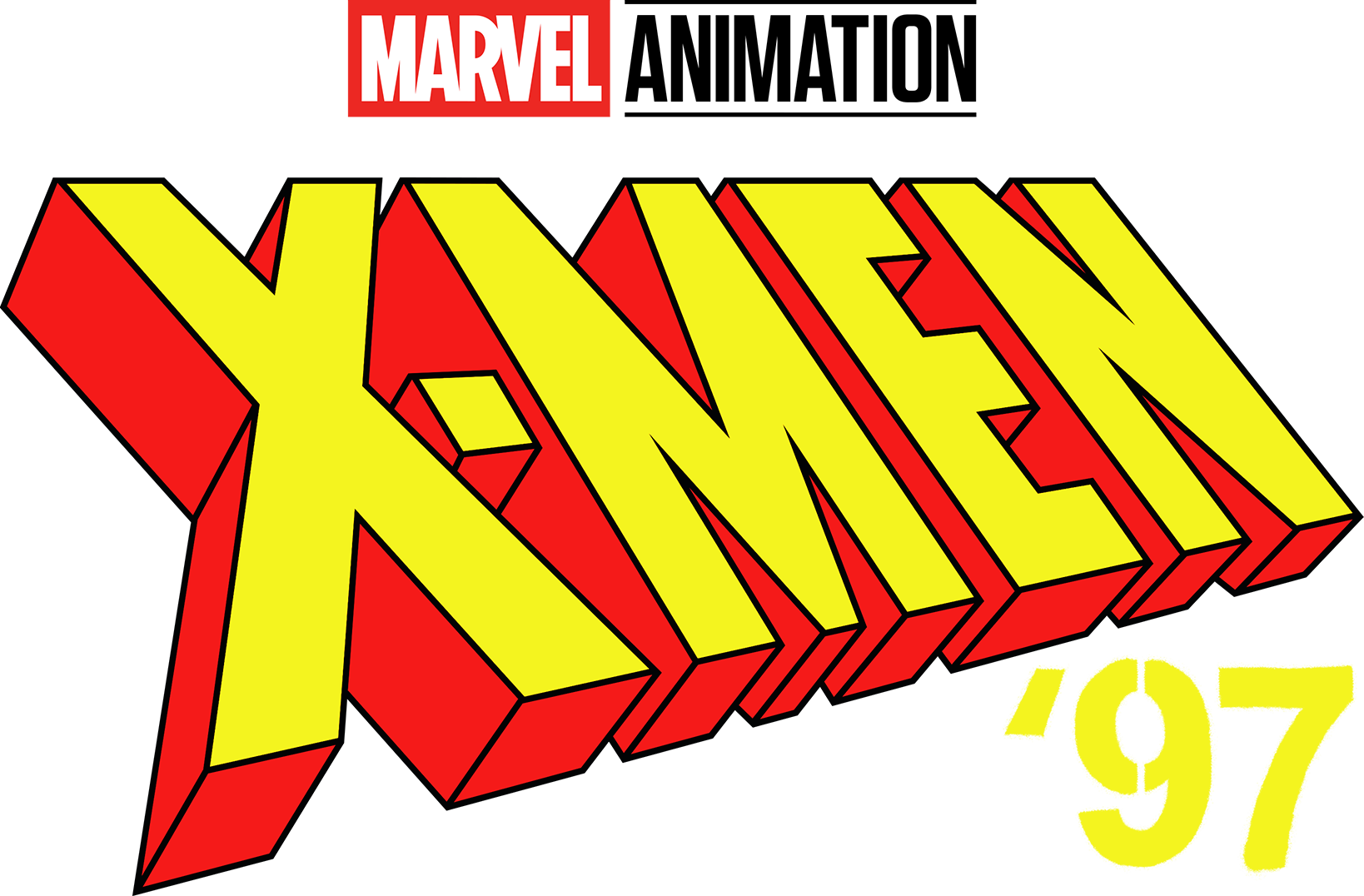
Logo for X-Men '97, the most recent X-Men television series. A continuation of X-Men: The Animated Series, '97 premiered on Disney+ in March 2024 and has been renewed for a second and third season.

The X-Men, a superhero team created by Stan Lee and Jack Kirby that appears in comic books produced by Marvel Comics, has appeared in multiple television series since the team's inception in 1963. X-Men: The Animated Series premiered on Fox Kids in 1992 and ran for five seasons until 1997. The series is credited with bringing mainstream attention to the X-Men. Following the conclusion of The Animated Series, a new X-Men cartoon titled X-Men: Evolution began airing on Kids' WB from 2000 to 2003 for four seasons.

Across the various X-Men television series, which characters make up the team's roster and are members of the cast often changes. The only characters to have appeared as cast members and part of the X-Men across all five series are Professor Charles Xavier, Scott Summers / Cyclops, Hank McCoy / Beast, James "Logan" Howlett / Wolverine, and Ororo Munroe / Storm. Besides these five characters, Jean Grey, Kurt Wagner / Nightcrawler, and Rogue have appeared in all five shows and been cast members in three; Warren Worthington III also appears in all five shows, being a cast member in two.

== X-Men series ==
Series	Season	Episodes	Originally released		Head writer	Director(s)	Network
Series	Season	Episodes	First released	Last released	Head writer	Director(s)	Network
X-Men: The Animated Series	1	13	October 31, 1992	March 27, 1993	Eric Lewald	Larry Houston	Fox Kids
X-Men: The Animated Series	2	13	October 23, 1993	February 19, 1994	Eric Lewald	Larry Houston	Fox Kids
X-Men: The Animated Series	3	19	July 29, 1994	October 5, 1996	Eric Lewald	Larry Houston	Fox Kids
X-Men: The Animated Series	4	21	May 6, 1995	October 26, 1996	Eric Lewald	Larry Houston	Fox Kids
X-Men: The Animated Series	5	10	September 7, 1996	September 20, 1997	Eric Lewald	Larry Houston	Fox Kids
X-Men: Evolution	1	13	November 4, 2000	May 12, 2001	Greg Johnson	Various	Kids' WB
X-Men: Evolution	2	17	September 29, 2001	May 11, 2002	Greg Johnson	Various	Kids' WB
X-Men: Evolution	3	13	September 14, 2002	August 23, 2003	Greg Johnson	Various	Kids' WB
X-Men: Evolution	4	9	August 30, 2003	October 25, 2003	Greg Johnson	Various	Kids' WB
Wolverine and the X-Men	1	26	January 23, 2009	November 29, 2009	Craig Kyle & Greg Johnson	Nicholas Filippi, Steven E. Gordon, Doug Murphy & Boyd Kirkland	Nicktoons
Marvel Anime: X-Men	1	12	April 1, 2011	June 24, 2011	Mitsutaka Hirota & Warren Ellis	Fuminori Kizaki	Animax & G4
X-Men '97	1	10	March 20, 2024	May 22, 2024	Beau DeMayo	Jake Castorena, Chase Conley and Emi-Emmett Yonemura	Disney+
X-Men '97	2	9	June 1, 2026	August 12, 2026	Matthew Chauncey	Chase Conley and Emi-Emmett Yonemura	Disney+

=== X-Men: The Animated Series (1992–1997) ===
In 1992, the Fox network launched X-Men: The Animated Series with the roster of Cyclops, Wolverine, Rogue, Storm, Beast, Gambit, Jubilee, Jean Grey, and Professor X with secondary background player Morph making occasional appearances. The two-part pilot episode, "Night of the Sentinels", began a five-season series. It was an extraordinary success and helped to widen the X-Men's popularity. The five seasons ended in 1997. It returned to Fox's line-up for several months after the first movie was released in 2000.

=== X-Men: Evolution (2000–2003) ===
In 2000, The WB launched the X-Men: Evolution television series, which portrayed the X-Men as teenagers attending a regular public high school in addition to the Xavier Institute. The series ended in 2003 after its fourth season. The show focused on Cyclops, Jean Grey, Nightcrawler, Rogue, Shadowcat, Wolverine, Storm, Beast, Professor X, Spyke (Storm's nephew), in addition to introducing the character Laura Kinney / X-23, who has since become a recurring character in the comics.

=== Wolverine and the X-Men (2009) ===
In 2008, Marvel Studios released a new X-Men animated show that featured Wolverine titled Wolverine and the X-Men. This series used a mesh of 2D/3D animation for characters and backgrounds. Avi Arad, CEO of Marvel Studios, stated "X-Men is one of Marvel's crown jewels and it makes sense to focus on the popular Wolverine character for our second animation project." The series debuted in the United States on January 23, 2009 and in the U.K. in February. It also aired in Latin America and Canada. The team consisted of Wolverine, Cyclops, Beast, Storm, Shadowcat, Iceman, Rogue, Nightcrawler, Angel, Jean Grey, Colossus, Forge, and Professor X. The show was cancelled after one season due to financing issues.

=== Marvel Anime: X-Men (2011) ===
As part of a four-series collaboration between the Japanese Madhouse animation house and Marvel, the X-Men starred in a 12 episode anime series that premiered in Japan on Animax and in the United States on G4 in 2011. The series deals with the X-Men coming to Japan to investigate the disappearance of Armor. The U-Men are the main antagonists.

=== X-Men '97 (2024–present) ===
Set a year after the conclusion of The Animated Series—in which Xavier nearly died in an assassination attempt and was taken to space to be healed by the alien Shi'ar empire—the X-Men face new challenges without Xavier, under the leadership of their former adversary Magneto.

In November 2021, Marvel announced that a revival of X-Men: The Animated Series, titled X-Men '97, was in production and set to air on the streaming service Disney+ in 2024. Beau DeMayo served as the head writer and executive producer for the series, with several cast members from the original animated series reprising their roles. Original animated series director Larry Houston and showrunners and producers Eric and Julia Lewald were announced as consultants for the series.

The first season premiered on Disney+ on March 20, 2024 and ran for 10 episodes. A second and third season are in development.

The entire cast of The Animated Series reappear as main characters. Cal Dodd, Alison Sealy-Smith, Lenore Zann, and George Buza all reprise their roles as Wolverine, Storm, Rogue, and Beast, respectively. At the beginning of the series, Morph and Lucas Bishop also join the cast, voiced by J. P. Karliak (replacing Ron Rubin) and Isaac Robinson-Smith (replacing Philip Akin).

== X-Men cast members ==
Character	Series				
Character	X-Men: The Animated Series (1992–1997)	X-Men: Evolution (2000–2003)	Wolverine and the X-Men (2009)	Marvel Anime: X-Men (2011)	X-Men '97 (2024–present)
Scott Summers / Cyclops	Main	Main	Main	Main	Main
James "Logan" Howlett / Wolverine	Main	Main	Main	Main	Main
Rogue	Main	Main	Recurring	Guest	Main
Ororo Munroe / Storm	Main	Main	Main	Main	Main
Hank McCoy / Beast	Main	Main	Main	Main	Main
Remy LeBeau / Gambit	Main	Recurring	Recurring	None	Main
Jubilation Lee / Jubilee	Main	Recurring	None	None	Main
Jean Grey	Main	Main	Recurring	Recurring	Main
Charles Xavier / Professor X	Main	Main	Main	Main	Main
Spyke	None	Main	None	None	None
Kitty Pryde / Shadowcat	None	Main	Main	None	None
Kurt Wagner / Nightcrawler	Guest	Main	Main	Guest	Main
Warren Worthington III / Angel / Archangel	Recurring	Recurring	Main	Guest	Main
Emma Frost	Guest	None	Main	Main	Recurring
Bobby Drake / Iceman	Guest	Recurring	Main	None	None
Hisako Ichiki / Armor	None	None	None	Main	None
Morph	Recurring	None	None	None	Main
Lucas Bishop	Recurring	None	Recurring	None	Main
Erik "Magnus" Lehnsherr / Magneto	Recurring	Recurring	Recurring	None	Main
Nathan Summers / Cable	Recurring	None	None	None	Main
Roberto "Bobby" da Costa / Sunspot	None	Recurring	None	None	Main
Betsy Braddock / Psylocke	Guest	None	Guest	None	Main
Lorna Dane / Polaris	Guest	None	Recurring	None	Main

== Reception ==
=== Critical response ===
Series	Season	Rotten Tomatoes	Metacritic
X-Men: The Animated Series	1	100% (18 reviews)	—N/a
X-Men: The Animated Series	2	—N/a	—N/a
X-Men: The Animated Series	3	100%	—N/a
X-Men: The Animated Series	4	—N/a	—N/a
X-Men: The Animated Series	5	50% (10 reviews)	—N/a
X-Men: Evolution	1	71% (7 reviews)	—N/a
X-Men: Evolution	2	—N/a	—N/a
X-Men: Evolution	3	—N/a	—N/a
X-Men: Evolution	4	—N/a	—N/a
Wolverine and the X-Men	1	67% (6 reviews)	—N/a
X-Men '97	1	99% (79 reviews)	82 (14 reviews)

== See also ==
- X-Men: Pryde of the X-Men
- X-Men (film series)
- List of television series based on Marvel Comics publications
- Marvel Television
- Marvel Animation
