= List of X-Men: Evolution episodes =

X-Men: Evolution is an American animated television series about the Marvel Comics superhero team X-Men. In this incarnation, many of the characters are teenagers rather than adults. The series ran for a total of four seasons (52 episodes) from November 2000 until October 2003 on Kids' WB.

== Series overview ==
Season	Episodes	Originally released	
Season	Episodes	First released	Last released
1	13	November 4, 2000	May 12, 2001
2	17	September 29, 2001	May 11, 2002
3	8	September 14, 2002	November 30, 2002
4	13	August 2, 2003	October 25, 2003

== Episodes ==
=== Season 1 (2000–2001) ===
No. overall	No. in season	Title	Directed by	Written by	Original release date
1	1	"Strategy X"	Frank Paur	Story by : Avi Arad & Rick Ungar; Teleplay by : Bob Forward	November 4, 2000
As Kurt Wagner (Nightcrawler) adapts to his new home at the Xavier Institute, Mystique attempts to spy on the facility with a young boy who has toad-like powers. Note: First appearance of Cyclops, Wolverine, Jean Grey, Charles Xavier, Storm, Nightcrawler, Toad, Mystique, Sabretooth, and Magneto.
2	2	"The X-Impulse"	Gary Graham	Story by : Greg Johnson & Rick Ungar; Teleplay by : Greg Johnson	November 11, 2000
Kitty Pryde discovers her mutant abilities of phasing through solid matter. Xavier sends Jean Grey on a mission to recruit Kitty, only to find out that she has already been won over by Lance Alvers, otherwise known as the mutant Avalanche, who can cause earthquakes and tremors. Note: First appearance of Avalanche.
3	3	"Rogue Recruit"	Steven E. Gordon	Simon Furman	November 18, 2000
When Rogue accidentally triggers her mutant ability by absorbing a local boy's memories, strengths, and abilities via mere skin contact, the X-Men head off to Caldecott County, Mississippi to recruit her. However, Mystique isn't willing to let her out of her sights because she wants her daughter to become one of them, so she and Destiny get to Rogue first to convince her that X-Men are hunting her down. Note: First appearance of Rogue & Destiny.
4	4	"Mutant Crush"	Frank Paur	Katherine Lawrence	November 25, 2000
Fred Dukes (Blob), a former freak show entertainer from the Texas State Fair, gets enlisted by Mystique into Bayville High. But his short temper and blubbery girth prevents him from making any necessary friends and makes him a target of bullying. He does get some help from Jean Grey who shows sympathy for him and helps him navigate his way around the school, but things take a turn for the worse when he mistakes these nice gestures as romantic interest. Note: First appearance of Blob.
5	5	"Speed and Spyke"	Gary Graham	Story by : Bob Forward & Rick Ungar; Teleplay by : Bob Forward	December 9, 2000
Evan Daniels, Ororo Munroe/Storm's nephew, is exhibiting his mutant ability of projecting boned spikes and projectiles. Despite knowing his mutant abilities, Evan initially refuses to join the X-Men. However, when former basketball teammate Pietro Maximoff (Quicksilver) continually steals money from him (along with getting him in trouble), Evan accepts the offer in an attempt to take his former friend down. Note: First appearances of Spyke & Quicksilver.
6	6	"Middleverse"	Steven E. Gordon	Story by : Evelyn Gabai & Adam Beechen; Teleplay by : Adam Beechen	January 27, 2001
One day, Kurt's childish behavior clashes with Scott's dead seriousness once too often. Later, Kurt accidentally activates a device which transfers him to a parallel dimension. There, he meets Forge, who had been trapped there since the late seventies, and together, they devise a plan to break out and return to their normal dimension. Things get complicated when the other X-Men discover the device and the Brotherhood then tries to steal it from them. Note: First appearance of Forge.
7	7	"Turn of the Rogue"	Boyd Kirkland	Story by : Rick Ungar & Greg Johnson; Teleplay by : Greg Johnson	February 3, 2001
Scott Summers/Cyclops and Jean Grey prepare for their geology club excursion, but Mystique has different plans in mind, replacing Jean with Rogue in an attempt to put further distance between her and the X-Men. In the end, Rogue finds out about Mystique's plans and finally joins the X-Men.
8	8	"SpykeCam"	Frank Paur	Story by : Rick Ungar & Randy Littlejohn; Teleplay by : Christy Marx & Randy Littlejohn	February 10, 2001
For extra credit, Spyke films the current events in his life. However, his project takes a turn for the worse when Sabretooth uses the video camera to find out where the Xavier Institute is in order to hunt down his rival, Wolverine.
9	9	"Survival of the Fittest"	Gary Graham	Pamela Hickey and Dennys McCoy	March 3, 2001
The X-Men and the Brotherhood battle each other in a summer camp, but must cooperate when a large and unstoppable mutant named Cain Marko (Juggernaut) threatens both Charles Xavier and Mystique. Note: First appearance of Juggernaut.
10	10	"Shadowed Past"	Steven E. Gordon	Story by : Jules Dennis; Teleplay by : Bob Forward	March 31, 2001
Rogue has nightmares about Kurt being abducted and experimented on (as a baby) by a dark figure (Magneto). It turns out that when she absorbed Kurt's memory, prior to her mother's (Mystique's) plan to keep her away from the X-Men, she also absorbed many more memories allowing the X-Men to find out that Mystique is Kurt's mother. However, Magneto finds out about all this and orders the Brotherhood to stop Mystique before she tells Nightcrawler all of his past.
11	11	"Grim Reminder"	Frank Paur	Len Uhley and Greg Johnson	April 14, 2001
Wolverine's tortured origin comes back to haunt him as he finds out that a wild monster ravaged Mount McKenna. He goes into the Canadian wilderness to find the beastly creature. He runs into not only his archrival Sabretooth, but the doctor who gave him his adamantium skeleton and adamantium claws. It turns out that the scientist still plans to use Wolverine to carry out his Weapon X animal program by brainwashing him with a microchip that was implanted into Logan's brain a long time ago. It's up to Shadowcat and Nightcrawler to save the day before the mind-controlled Wolverine and Sabretooth destroy them both.
12	12	"The Cauldron - Part 1"	Gary Graham	Simon Furman	May 5, 2001
Scott is reunited with his younger brother Alex, who is recruited by Magneto to join him as the X-Men are forced to fight the Brotherhood for a place in Magneto's sanctuary. Note: First appearance of Havok.
13	13	"The Cauldron - Part 2"	Steven E. Gordon	Greg Johnson	May 12, 2001
Magneto holds multiple battles to find out which mutants are "worthy" of joining him on Asteroid M. The "winners" are abducted by force and offered a place in the Cauldron, where Magneto offers to greatly strengthen and increase their mutant abilities to their full and maximum potential despite Professor X telling them that it will alter their mind and body.

=== Season 2 (2001–2002) ===
No. overall	No. in season	Title	Directed by	Written by	Original release date
14	1	"Growing Pains"	Frank Paur	Cydne Clark & Steve Granat	September 29, 2001
The Brotherhood (minus Mystique) gatecrash the girls' championship soccer match (in which Jean's team is taking part) and threaten to expose mutantkind to the world. Note: First appearance of the New Mutants (Iceman, Cannonball, Magma, Jubilee, Berzerker, Sunspot, Boom Boom, Wolfsbane and Multiple Man). The DVD has a deleted scene where Avalanche saves Shadowcat from a falling statue.
15	2	"Power Surge"	Gary Graham	Story by : Greg Johnson; Teleplay by : Doug Molitor	October 13, 2001
Jean Grey suddenly loses control of both her strong telepathic and telekinetic abilities. And the only one who can stop her psionic abilities from further going haywire is Rogue.
16	3	"Bada-Bing Bada-Boom"	Steven E. Gordon	Greg Johnson	October 6, 2001
Boom Boom romantically flirts with Nightcrawler, and then gets a visit from her criminal father who wants her to commit a crime for him.
17	4	"Fun and Games"	Frank Paur	Brian Swenlin	October 20, 2001
While Professor X has to mend Juggernaut's stasis cell, the younger X-Men trick Cyclops and Jean Grey into leaving the Mansion in order to have a party. Note: First appearance of Arcade.
18	5	"The Beast of Bayville"	Gary Graham	William Forrest Cluverius	October 27, 2001
Dr. Hank McCoy has no strength left to fight his bestial mutation, which forces him to be a violent and angry Beast. Note: Introduction of Beast's mutant form.
19	6	"Adrift"	Steven E. Gordon	Greg Johnson	November 3, 2001
Alex gets caught in a riptide while surfing using a surf board fitted with a webcam. Scott goes out to rescue him, but a huge storm threatens both their lives.
20	7	"African Storm"	Gary Graham	Nick Dubois	November 17, 2001
Storm is tormented by Hungan, an evil African shaman who wants to steal her abilities and use them to take over Africa.
21	8	"Joyride"	Steven E. Gordon	Cydne Clark and Steve Granat	December 1, 2001
Avalanche wants to join the X-Men in order to be closer to Kitty. However, he has trouble fitting in and, after antagonizing Scott, becomes the prime suspect for several recent joyrides committed by some cocky New Mutants.
22	9	"On Angel's Wings"	Frank Paur	Boyd Kirkland	December 15, 2001
During Christmas time, a mysterious angel is saving lives. Rogue and Cyclops track down Warren Worthington, who is deeply unsure about his mutation. Note First appearance of Angel.
23	10	"Mindbender"	Steven E. Gordon	Story by : Greg Johnson; Teleplay by : Bob Forward	January 26, 2002
A mysterious hypnotist named Mesmero kidnaps some of the X-Men (Jean Grey, Spyke, Nightcrawler and Kitty Pryde) and brainwashes them into committing crimes for him. Note: First appearance of Mesmero. Foreshadowing of Apocalypse and opening his first gate.
24	11	"Shadow Dance"	Boyd Kirkland	Boyd Kirkland	February 2, 2002
The Bayville High Sadie Hawkins dance arrives, and everybody is scrambling for dates. While this is going on, Forge constructs a device to greatly strengthen and magnify Nightcrawler's teleportation abilities to the point where he teleport across much longer and greater distances, however the demonic creatures he encounters while passing through a separate dimension during his teleporting, manage to escape through open portals Nightcrawler leaves behind. Note: First appearance of Amanda Sefton.
25	12	"Retreat"	Frank Paur	Michael Merton	February 16, 2002
In order to help a depressive Beast out of his slump, Kitty arranges a field trip with the younger X-Men (Spyke, Sunspot, Wolfsbane, Iceman). However, hunters catch Beast, thinking him to be Bigfoot.
26	13	"Walk on the Wild Side"	Frank Paur	Story by : Greg Johnson; Teleplay by : Cydne Clark and Steve Granat	March 2, 2002
The female X-Men are fed up with playing second fiddle, and form a vigilante crime-fighting group called the Bayville Sirens.
27	14	"Operation: Rebirth"	Gary Graham	Story by : Boyd Kirkland, Greg Johnson; Teleplay by : Bob Forward	March 30, 2002
Nick Fury informs Wolverine that Magneto has stolen a device once used to create the super-soldier Captain America. Wolverine, Rogue, and Nightcrawler go to recover it. Note: First appearance of Nick Fury. Guest appearance by Captain America.
28	15	"The Hex Factor"	Gary Graham	Cydne Clark and Steve Granat	April 20, 2002
Mystique returns to the Brotherhood with a mentally unstable, but immensely strong and powerful mutant named Wanda Maximoff, much to the horror of her brother Pietro. Note: First appearance of Scarlet Witch and Agatha Harkness.
29	16	"Day of Reckoning - Part 1"	Gary Graham, Steven E. Gordon and Frank Paur	Story by : Greg Johnson & Boyd Kirkland; Teleplay by : Cydne Clark & Steve Granat	May 11, 2002
Anti-mutants activist Bolivar Trask abducts Wolverine and introduces him to his newest invention, the Sentinels. Meanwhile, Magneto wants to provoke an all-out war between humans and mutants, and summons his Acolytes to create mayhem. Note: First appearance of the Acolytes (Gambit, Pyro, Colossus), the Sentinels, and Bolivar Trask.
30	17	"Day of Reckoning - Part 2"	Gary Graham, Steven E. Gordon and Frank Paur	Story by : Greg Johnson & Boyd Kirkland; Teleplay by : Cydne Clark & Steve Granat	May 11, 2002
The X-Men are shocked when Professor X teams them up with the Brotherhood to stop Magneto, but then, a shocking twist reveals that nothing was as it seemed to be.

=== Season 3 (2002) ===
No. overall	No. in season	Title	Directed by	Written by	Original release date
31	1	"Day of Recovery"	Gary Graham	Story by : Boyd Kirkland & Greg Johnson; Teleplay by : Cydne Clark & Steve Granat	September 14, 2002
The remaining X-Men and Brotherhood members go to Area 51 to rescue their captive members. They team up with the Brotherhood and Nick Fury points them in the right direction, they save the others, but Cyclops leaves Mystique behind. Note: First appearance of Caliban
32	2	"The Stuff of Heroes"	Curt Geda	Story by : Greg Johnson; Teleplay by : Bob Forward	September 21, 2002
While Storm and Beast step in front of the Senate to try curbing the rampant anti-mutant crowd, the rest of the X-Men have to stop Juggernaut, who has been unleashed by Mystique and is threatening to destroy a dam.
33	3	"Mainstream"	Frank Paur	Story by : Greg Johnson; Teleplay by : Michael Merton	September 28, 2002
Despite rescuing Professor X, the bigotry towards mutants still exists as our heroes return to Bayville High, scorned and verbally abused by their human classmates, including their mutant-hating Principal Edward Kelly. Also, the School Board decides whether or not to allow mutants to attend school. However, Kelly enlists Duncan to team up with the Brotherhood (Avalanche, Toad, & Blob) to ensure a permanent mutant ban. Note: Lance and Kitty's relationship becomes troubled during the fight in the school parking lot, where they realize that their romantic relationship will not work out as long as they're on different, opposing teams. Also Jean Grey and Duncan's platonic relationship ends.
34	4	"The Stuff of Villains"	Gary Graham	Adam Beechen	October 5, 2002
Wanda wants to find out where her father Magneto is, so she enlists Caliban for help. She then goes to her brother Quicksilver for info. When he refuses, Wanda delivers him to the police. When the Brotherhood tries to break him out of a prison transport (as part of Magneto's offer from Gambit), Rogue and Shadowcat appear to break up their rescue operation. Note: This is the first episode in which Gambit refers to Rogue as "cherie" (French for "cherished one" or "darling")
35	5	"Blind Alley"	Curt Geda	Story by : Greg Johnson, Boyd Kirkland & Craig Kyle; Teleplay by : Doug Molitor	October 19, 2002
Jean is about to confess her strong and deep mutual romantic love to Scott when Mystique (who managed to escape from Area 51 and is out for revenge) abducts Scott and abandons him in the desert in Mexico without his ruby quartz glasses. Jean, who has vivid telepathic visions of him in peril, tracks him down, but Mystique is determined to kill them both. Note: Scott and Jean's platonic relationship grows to an even closer and deeper romantic relationship after this episode.
36	6	"X-Treme Measures"	Frank Paur	Story by : Greg Johnson & Boyd Kirkland; Teleplay by : Jules Dennis & Greg Johnson	November 2, 2002
Spyke joins a skateboarding contest sponsored by "Pow-R 8" soda. However, Pow-R 8 is harmful to mutants and causes Spyke to lose control of his powers when he drinks it. He is saved by the Morlocks, who he later joins. Note: First appearance of the Morlocks.
37	7	"The Toad, the Witch and the Wardrobe"	Gary Graham	Steve Granat and Cydne Clark	November 9, 2002
Wanda tracks down Magneto to his Acolyte headquarters in a nearby ski resort. Meanwhile, Kurt is spending time with Amanda Sefton and meeting her parents. In a bid to win Wanda's affections, Toad steals Nightcrawler's image inducer (thereby blowing his cover in front of the Sefton household) and pursues Wanda, followed by an angry Kurt. However, when Wanda gets abducted by Magneto and is brainwashed by Mastermind into believing her father was a kind and giving man (erasing her memory of the asylum she was sent to), the two team up to rescue her. Note: First appearance of Mastermind and Margali Szardos.
38	8	"Self Possessed"	Curt Geda	Greg Johnson	November 16, 2002
Rogue witnesses her infatuated crush, Scott, date Jean. She is consoled by her British friend, Risty, but when she accidentally touches and absorbs everything from her at a concert, she finds out that she was Mystique all along in disguise. Absorbing Mystique's power, Rogue's alter-egos from inside that she has absorbed in the past, use the shape-shifting ability she accidentally borrowed from Mystique to break free from Rogue's inner self, fighting to take control over her body and mind. Thinking everybody hates her, Rogue's latent multiple personality disorder breaks through and she loses her sanity. The X-Men have to stop their friend and colleague, who has all of their mutant abilities combined and in the verge of burning herself out.
39	9	"Under Lock and Key"	Frank Paur	Sean Roche	November 30, 2002
Angel spots Gambit stealing a mysterious artifact, but when he tries to stop him, Mesmero fights him off. When the Acolytes want to steal another artifact, the X-Men fight them and discover there is a bigger plan happening. Soon both teams face a spider-like being which is virtually unstoppable. Magneto and the Acolytes destroy the spider, but it is revealed to be a guardian who was intended to prevent Apocalypse's release. Now that it is destroyed, the second gate will open.

=== Season 4 (2003) ===
No. overall	No. in season	Title	Directed by	Written by	Original release date
40	1	"Cruise Control"	Gary Graham	Steve Granat and Cydne Clark	August 23, 2003
Taking a break from superhero duty, the X-Men (without Rogue and Berzerker) take a pleasure cruise. But Magma becomes violently ill, literally suffering from earth withdrawal. When Boom Boom and Iceman take her to an island, she accidentally triggers a volcano. When the volcano threatens to explode again, Magma dives into its heart to silence it once and for all. Note: Originally aired out of order.
41	2	"X23"	Curt Geda	Story by : Craig Kyle; Teleplay by : Craig Kyle & Chris Yost	August 2, 2003
A mysterious female assassin terrorizes the X-Mansion, knocking out the X-Men one by one. Wolverine finds out that it is his clone, created by Deborah Risman and raised without love by Hydra, and she wants to kill him because she holds him responsible for her existence. Wolverine and X-23, as she is called, square off in a battle that Wolverine does not want to win.
42	3	"Dark Horizon – Part 1"	Frank Paur	Story by : Greg Johnson, Boyd Kirkland, Craig Kyle; Teleplay by : Chris Yost, Craig Kyle	August 9, 2003
Rogue falls under the mind control of Mesmero and is used as a weapon to absorb the powers of the X-Men, the Brotherhood of Mutants and the Acolytes. The three factions reluctantly cooperate and find out that Mesmero wants Rogue to give all of her stolen powers to Apocalypse to awaken him.
43	4	"Dark Horizon – Part 2"	Gary Graham	Story by : Greg Johnson, Boyd Kirkland, Craig Kyle; Teleplay by : Chris Yost, Craig Kyle	August 16, 2003
The X-Men, the Brotherhood of Mutants and the Acolytes track Apocalypse to Egypt, but fail to prevent him from coming back to life. Mankind is now in terrible danger.
44	5	"Impact"	Gary Graham	Greg Johnson	August 30, 2003
A strange phenomenon occurs in the wake of Apocalypse: A jungle-covered Mayan pyramid takes on a technological appearance and an impenetrable force shield surrounds it, even down into the ground underneath. The X-Men receive permission from the government there to study the base. However, Magneto, in an act of revenge, makes an attack upon it. Meanwhile, Nightcrawler tries to revive his mother Mystique who is still trapped in stone, much to the dismay of Rogue.
45	6	"No Good Deed"	Doug Murphy	Story by : Greg Johnson, Boyd Kirkland, Craig Kyle; Teleplay by : William Forrest Cluverius	September 6, 2003
Wanda accidentally causes an accident on the subway, and by helping the civilians the Brotherhood improve their Image. In order to boost their reputation, the Brotherhood decide to stage accidents and then rescue the bystanders. The plan starts out as a success, until a staged accident runs out of hand.
46	7	"Target X"	Frank Paur	Craig Kyle; Christopher Yost	September 13, 2003
After being kidnapped by Omega Red, Wolverine manages to escape to a nearby forest. There he finds his clone, X-23, on a personal mission to destroy the person responsible for creating her: Madame Hydra. Now, the two team up to take on Hydra and destroy the Hydra base. Meanwhile, Cyclops and Jean Grey try to teach the New Mutants much more advanced ways of using their mutant abilities. Note: First appearance of Madame Hydra, Omega Red, and Gauntlet.
47	8	"Sins of the Son"	Gary Graham	Story by : Greg Johnson, Boyd Kirkland, Craig Kyle; Teleplay by : Marsha F. Griffin	September 20, 2003
Charles Xavier's son David has been seemingly abducted. Charles, Storm, Cyclops, & Jean Grey track him down in Scotland, and it turns out that he suffers from multiply identity disorder, and that his hidden malicious personality, (born out of his hatred and agony for his father and his evil will), called Lucas, is overwhelming him. Meanwhile, Kitty and Kurt have some not so good adventures while they're ill with the flu, as Kurt teleports involuntarily as he sneezes in his sleep. Note: First appearance of Legion.
48	9	"Uprising"	Doug Murphy	Story by : Greg Johnson, Boyd Kirkland, Craig Kyle; Teleplay by : Bob Forward	September 27, 2003
Spyke makes his return, having turned into an angry vigilante who protects the Morlocks. He is unafraid to go in public with his disfiguring mutation, causing panic in his environment, especially since the extreme prejudice against mutants is on the rise. Anti-mutantists Duncan Matthews and his friends go and hunt Spyke down, and they even stumble upon a small boy named Dorian Leech. Also, in a moment of foreshadowing, Nick Fury of SHIELD releases Bolivar Trask and orders him to build new improved Sentinels.
49	10	"Cajun Spice"	Frank Paur	Story by : Greg Johnson, Boyd Kirkland; Teleplay by : Michael Merton, Greg Johnson	October 4, 2003
Gambit kidnaps Rogue but claims he's trying to help her forget what she did to Mystique, a deed which has left her feeling guilty. But actually Gambit's just using her to help him find his adopted father who has been kidnapped. The X-Men notice Rogue's missing, and Wolverine goes on a hunt to search for her.
50	11	"Ghost of a Chance"	Gary Graham	Greg Johnson	October 11, 2003
Kitty meets Danielle Moonstar and they quickly become friends. But she wakes up the next morning and realizes that she (seemingly) dreamed everything up. Strangely, it appears that Kitty's dreams had a deeper meaning, leading into a race-against-time search as she tries to find her new best friend. Note: First appearance of Danielle Moonstar.
51	12	"Ascension - Part 1"	Doug Murphy	Story by : Greg Johnson, Craig Kyle, Boyd Kirkland; Teleplay by : Greg Johnson	October 18, 2003
Apocalypse plans to turn all humans with the dormant X-gene into mutants, while killing those who aren't strong enough. He has turned Magneto, Professor X, Storm, and Mystique into his Four Horsemen, and has covered the world with a network of energy pyramids to stage his plan.
52	13	"Ascension - Part 2"	Frank Paur	Story by : Greg Johnson, Boyd Kirkland, Craig Kyle; Teleplay by : Greg Johnson	October 25, 2003
In order to prevent all humans from being turned into mutants, the X-Men, the Brotherhood of Mutants, S.H.I.E.L.D., the Acolytes, Angel, Spyke, Havok and the New Mutants all join forces to save humanity from the ambitions of Apocalypse. Rogue defeats Apocalypse at the last minute by borrowing Leech's ability to cancel other mutant abilities. She stops the pyramids' energy and closes his case with Apocalypse still inside. Wolverine helps, sending him back through time. In the end, Professor Xavier shares his visions of the future while he was under Apocalypse's mind control: The discrimination and persecution of mutants continues; Magneto as teacher of the New Mutants; The Brotherhood working for S.H.I.E.L.D.; Jean Grey is possessed by the Phoenix Force and becomes the Dark Phoenix.
