= Spyke =

- Spyke from the X-Men Evolution series

Publication information
- Publisher: Marvel Comics
- First appearance: X-Men: Evolution: "Speed and Spyke" (December 9, 2000)
- First comic appearance: X-Men: Evolution #1 (November 2001, cover-only appearance); X-Men: Evolution #4 (February 2002, full appearance)
- Created by: Robert N. Skir; Steven E. Gordon

In-story information
- Alter ego: Evan Daniels
- Species: Human mutant
- Team affiliations: Morlocks; X-Men; Brotherhood of Mutants
- Notable aliases: Armadillo; Porcupine
- Abilities: Bone spike generation; Enhanced strength; Skilled skateboarder

Spyke (Evan Daniels) is a fictional character created by writer Robert N. Skir and artist Steven E. Gordon for the WB animated superhero series X-Men: Evolution, which is based on American comic books published by Marvel Comics. Voiced by Neil Denis, the character is a high school student with the mutant ability to project spikes out of his body. Originally, Spyke was intended to be called Armadillo and have cornrows. He was created as a way to diversify the series' X-Men roster and include an African-American character among the main cast. Spyke has similar powers to Marrow, a pre-existing character, though Boyd Kirkland stated that this was not intentional.

== Fictional character biography ==
Evan Daniels was born in New York City, New York to an unnamed father and Vivian Daniels. His mutant abilities are first noticed at his high school basketball game by his aunt Ororo Munroe (a.k.a. Storm, a longtime member of the X-Men), and his teammate Pietro. The following night, Storm, along with Cyclops and Jean Grey, approach Evan's parents about his mutant powers and his attending the Xavier Institute. Evan angrily declines on his own behalf and leaves.

He goes to his school to catch the thief who keeps breaking into his locker. It is revealed that Pietro is not only the thief, but a mutant with super speed powers. Pietro, who renames himself Quicksilver, breaks into all the lockers in the school and lets Evan take the heat while he escapes prosecution. Only when Charles Xavier uses his pull to help Evan get out of prison does he join the X-Men and the school under the code name Spyke. Spyke settles the score with Quicksilver when he, Cyclops, and Jean defeat the speedy mutant. Spyke is cleared of all charges when he catches Quicksilver's confession on tape.

During his tenure with the X-Men, Spyke forgoes receiving special treatment from anyone at the school due to being Storm's nephew. Though he likes being an X-Man and thought of them as his family, Spyke at times acts selfishly and inconsiderate of others. After he and the X-Men are publicly revealed as mutants in the third season, Spyke grows angry at how they are being treated. After drinking Pow-R8, an energy drink that is toxic to mutants, Spyke loses control of his powers, becoming unable to retract or control his spikes. After seeing how cruelly he is treated because of his condition, Spyke joins the Morlocks, a group of mutants who cannot "pass" for human and are forced to live underground. Storm tries to convince Spyke to come back to the X-Men, but he refuses.

When Spyke returns in the fourth season, he has gained armadillo-like armor on his upper body and the new ability to ignite his spikes. Spyke begins using his powers to fight against humans who are attempting to commit hate crimes against the Morlocks and mutants in general. These actions eventually cause him to be targeted by a group of anti-mutant bigots led by Duncan Matthews. Spyke is cornered, but the Morlocks and X-Men step in and defeat Duncan and his accomplices, who are arrested. When Storm tries to persuade Spyke to return to the institute, he states that the Morlocks need him more and chooses to remain with them.

In the series finale, Spyke assists the X-Men in destroying Apocalypse's pyramids. He is last seen in a group photo with the future X-Men, the New Mutants, and their unaffiliated allies. In this photo, he is wearing the bottom half of his X-Men costume, which may mean he has finally returned to the X-Men.

== Powers and abilities ==
Spyke can extend or retract bone spikes that grow inside his body. He may shoot them out or bring them out to grab and hold. He also needs to drink milk to replace the calcium that he loses when using his powers. His body also seals the wounds caused by projecting his spikes with no visible scarring. He is also an expert skateboarder, and has integrated his skateboarding prowess into battles.

In later episodes, Spyke gains the ability to ignite the ends of his spikes and scale walls by sticking his spikes into them.

== Other versions ==
David Munroe, a character loosely based on Spyke, appears in the Earth-616 continuity. He is Storm's cousin, and named after her late father.

Another character named Darian Elliott, otherwise known as Spike, was introduced in X-Force #124. His appearance, name and powers were also loosely based on Spyke.

A clone of Spyke created by Mojo appears in X-Babies Stars Reborn.

== See also ==
- List of X-Men: Evolution characters
- List of Marvel Comics characters
