= Risty =

Risty may refer to:

- Risty Wilde, a character in the animated television series X-Men Evolution, disguise for Mystique
- Risty, a character in the Queen's Blade game series and anime series
