= Ultimate Avengers =

2006 American animated film

Ultimate Avengers: The Movie
- Official DVD poster
- Directed by: Curt Geda; Steven E. Gordon; Bob Richardson
- Written by: Greg Johnson; Boyd Kirkland; Craig Kyle
- Based on: The Ultimates by Mark Millar and Bryan Hitch
- Produced by: Bob Richardson
- Starring: Justin Gross; Andre Ware; Grey Griffin; Michael Massee; Marc Worden; Olivia d'Abo; Nolan North; Dave Boat; Fred Tatasciore
- Edited by: George Rizkallah
- Music by: Guy Michelmore
- Production companies: Lionsgate Films; MLG Productions; Marvel Studios
- Distributed by: Lionsgate Films Home Entertainment
- Release dates: February 7, 2006 (WonderCon); February 21, 2006 (United States)
- Running time: 72 minutes
- Country: United States
- Language: English

Ultimate Avengers: The Movie (also known simply as Ultimate Avengers) is a 2006 American animated superhero film based on the Ultimates comic book series by Marvel Comics. The film is the first installment in the Marvel Animated Features (MAF) film series, and follows Captain America, who is thawed and recruited by Nick Fury to fight an alien race.

Premiering on February 7, 2006, at WonderCon, Ultimate Avengers was released direct-to-video in the United States on February 21. A sequel to the film, titled Ultimate Avengers 2: Rise of the Panther, premiered at San-Diego Comic Con on July 22, 2006, five months after the first film was released. The film was also aired on Cartoon Network's Toonami block on April 22, 2006.

== Plot ==
In the North Atlantic in 1945, a squadron of B-24 Liberators transport the 101st Airborne Division. The radio announces that Berlin has been taken and Nazi Germany is expected to surrender. However, there are also claims of a Nazi superweapon that is aimed at the United States of America.

Steve Rogers, better known as Captain America, leads the mission on an island near Norway where the superweapon is believed to be held. Rogers storms through the fortress and is confronted by his nemesis Herr Kleiser, who is revealed to be an extraterrestrial shape-shifter. The superweapon is launched, leaving Rogers the choice to throw himself onto the rocket and harmlessly cause it to self destruct, while having a final confrontation with Kleiser. The missile is destroyed, but Rogers falls into the ocean and the world believes he is dead.

Decades later, Rogers' body is recovered by S.H.I.E.L.D. director Nick Fury and thawed out into modern day. Gamma scientist Bruce Banner is working on a super soldier serum for S.H.I.E.L.D., while on medications that keep him from transforming into the Hulk. S.H.I.E.L.D. sends a satellite into space to track the three remaining alien ships, but is ultimately destroyed by the invaders, forcing Fury to reluctantly initiate Project: Avenger.

Fury and Rogers try to recruit the Norse god Thor, who rejects the offer to continue environmentalist protests. The resulting recruits are Captain America, Bruce Banner, Iron Man, Giant-Man, Wasp, Natalia Romanov, and Betty Ross. Fury briefs the team about the aliens, named the Chitauri, and the use of the metal vibranium, while Banner struggles to repress the Hulk persona and Rogers is hesitant of leading the Avengers.

The team's first mission is to capture a Chitauri spy which has breached a S.H.I.E.L.D. facility. The Avengers disregard Rogers' orders and follow their own egos, resulting in failure which allows the alien to escape with all sufficient information about S.H.I.E.L.D.. Fury fires an arrogant Hank Pym, who is followed by his wife Wasp. Iron Man, now revealed to be Tony Stark, resigns immediately. Rogers also chooses to leave Fury, feeling unready to fight the Chitauri.

Desperate for soldiers to combat the coming assault on S.H.I.E.L.D.'s New York facility, Fury demands that Banner applies his super soldier serum to all of his candidates. Betty Ross learns that Banner was only using the serum as a diversion to find a way to control the Hulk. Banner steps into a "rebirth chamber", which transforms him into the Hulk while retaining his mind. Fury and the Black Widow lead a failing attack against the alien invaders, but each Avenger shows up, now joined by Thor, to send the three ships crashing into the ocean.

Banner loses control and the Hulk kills the Chitauri before lashing out against the Avengers. The Hulk proves strong enough to knock out a full-size Giant-Man, damage Iron Man's suit and even, with effort, to lift Thor's hammer Mjolnir. The Avengers manage to inject the Hulk with a high dose of Banner's medication, and Betty Ross calms the Hulk long enough to let the drug render him human again.

Banner is kept in a glass cell for breaking Fury's trust, and the Avengers celebrate their success against the Chitauri and praise a wounded Captain America for leading them as a team.

== Cast ==
- Justin Gross as Steve Rogers / Captain America
- Grey Griffin as Janet Pym / The Wasp
- Michael Massee as Bruce Banner
- Marc Worden as Tony Stark / Iron Man
- Olivia d'Abo as Natalia Romanoff / Black Widow
- Nan McNamara as Dr. Betty Ross
- Nolan North as Hank Pym / Giant-Man
- Andre Ware as Nick Fury
- Dave Boat as Thor
- Fred Tatasciore as Edwin Jarvis and Hulk
- James K. Ward as Herr Kleiser
- James Arnold Taylor as Bucky Barnes

== Production ==
In July 2004, Marvel Entertainment, Marvel Comics' new parent corporation, announced they had struck a deal with Lionsgate Entertainment to produce a series of eight to ten direct-to-video animated film under the name of Marvel Animated Features (MAF). These were to be produced in conjunction with Marvel Studios, Marvel's direct film subsidiary. Ultimate Avengers was planned as the first film in the series.

== Soundtrack ==
The film's soundtrack was released alongside the film. It was released on iTunes on December 15, 2006.

== Release ==
Ultimate Avengers was slated for a February 2006 release. It premiered on February 7, 2006, at WonderCon. It was released in the United States on February 21, 2006, by Lionsgate Films Home Entertainment.

On April 24, 2007, the two Ultimate Avengers films were paired together and released on Blu-ray in the United States.

== Reception ==
=== Sales ===
Ultimate Avengers grossed $6.7 million in home video sales in the United States.

In its first week of release, the film ranked fourth in DVD sales in the United States, grossing $3.5 million. In its second weekend, the film dropped to 21st, grossing $1 million.

=== Critical response ===
Todd Gilchrist of IGN gave the film a mostly positive review, calling the plot "well-executed if perfunctory." However, he stated that "in terms of storytelling, emotional content or universal appeal, considering this film the Ultimate anything remains an overstatement that has yet to be proven true."

Chris Hewitt of Empire gave the film a mixed review, criticizing the "non-atmospheric animation, weak voice acting and a dumbed-down plot," but calling the interplay between the characters "spot-on" and praising the characterization. Jeffrey M. Anderson of Common Sense Media also criticized the animation and plot while also loathing the short 72-minute runtime; however, he praised Captain America's extended screen time and the film "telling a good story as quickly and economically as possible." David Cornelius of eFilmCritic.com stated, "It's too violent for younger viewers, but not mature enough for older ones. It's a movie trapped in between target audiences."

=== Accolades ===
Year	Award	Category	Recipients	Result
2007	Cinema Audio Society Awards	Outstanding Achievement in Sound Mixing for DVD Original Programming	Mike Draghi, Eric Lewis	Won
2007	Golden Reel Awards	Best Sound Editing in a Direct to Video Project	Ultimate Avengers: The Movie	Nominated

== Sequel ==
A direct sequel to the film, titled Ultimate Avengers 2: Rise of the Panther, was already planned alongside the first film. It premiered at San Diego Comic-Con on July 22, 2006, and was released on DVD August 8.

== See also ==
- Ultimates
