= Duncan Matthews =

Duncan Matthews may refer to:

- Duncan Matthews (rugby union) (born 1994), South African rugby union player
- Duncan Matthews, a character in the animated television series X-Men: Evolution
