= Elyse Levesque =

Canadian actress

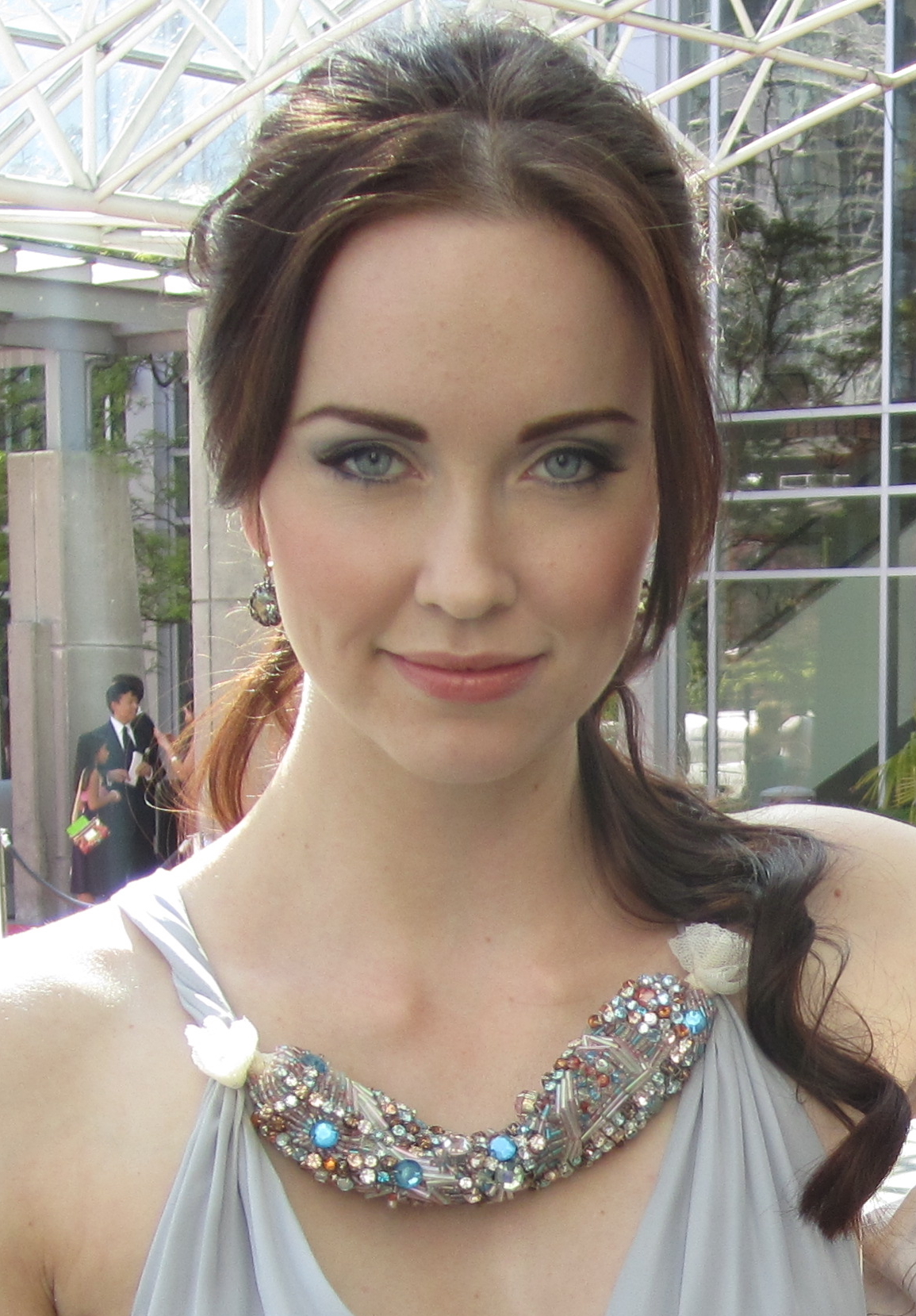
- Levesque in 2010
- Born: Elyse Marie Levesque; September 10, 1985 (age 40); Regina, Saskatchewan, Canada
- Occupation: Actress
- Years active: 1997–present

Elyse Marie Levesque (/ɛˈliːs ləˈvɛk/ el-EESS lə-VEK; born September 10, 1985) is a Canadian actress. She is best known for playing Chloe Armstrong in the Syfy original series Stargate Universe and Genevieve in the CW series The Originals.

== Early life ==
Levesque was born and raised in Regina, Saskatchewan, the only child of Hally (née Engelsjord), an executive assistant in the president's office at the University of Regina, and Louis Levesque. Her father was Fransaskois while her mother was originally from the United States, being born in Waukegan, Illinois.

== Career ==
Elyse Levesque began acting at age 11 when she became part of a repertory company of young actors for the acclaimed children's television series The Incredible Story Studio. She also did commercial work, and went on to a two-year stint playing the villainous Maxine Rich on the futuristic children's series 2030 CE.

Following high school, Levesque traveled around the world for two years as a model working in Taiwan, Japan, Italy, Spain, and France before returning to Canada to study fine arts. In 2006, she moved to Vancouver, British Columbia, to focus on a full-time acting career. She immediately enrolled in acting classes, and began to land parts in a number of television and film projects. She has taken on diverse roles ranging from Virginia (Cissy) Poe, the ailing wife of Edgar Allan Poe, in the Masters of Horror episode "The Black Cat", to a flame-wielding bog witch in Flash Gordon. She has also made guest appearances in Smallville, Men in Trees, and a variety of other TV shows for both Canadian and American media markets.

Levesque portrayed Chloe Armstrong, the daughter of a U.S. Senator in the Syfy original series, Stargate Universe, arguably her best known role. In 2014, she played the role of the witch Genevieve in the first season of The Vampire Diaries-spin-off The Originals.

== Filmography ==
=== Film ===
Year	Title	Role	Notes
2005	The Lost Angel	Young Billie	
2007	Normal	Marcy	
2009	Christmas Crash	Teresa Johnson	Direct-to-video film
2012	Slumber Party Slaughter	Nadia	
2012	In Return	Lola	
2013	Sons of Liberty	Rourke	
2014	Fishing Naked	Amy	
2014	Spare Change	Lily Horowitz	
2016	Meridian	Woman in white	
2019	Ready or Not	Charity Le Domas	
2020	The Big Ugly	Jackie	
2020	The Corruption of Divine Providence	Danielle Séraphin	
2022	The Darker the Lake	Tamara Fischer	

=== Television ===
Year	Title	Role	Notes
1997	Incredible Story Studios	Various	TV series
2001	MythQuest	Eurydice	Episode: "Orpheus"
2002–2003	2030 CE	Maxine Rich	TV series
2004	The Cradle Will Fall'	Maureen	TV film
2004	renegadepress.com	Vanessa	Episode: "A Very Thin Edge"
2006	Family in Hiding	Alicia Peterson	TV film
2007	Masters of Horror	Virginia Poe	Episode: "The Black Cat"
2007	Unthinkable	Kelly Shaw	TV film
2007	The Wedding Wish	Tina Landers	TV film
2007	renegadepress.com	Vanessa	Episode: "Blackout"
2007	The Deadly Pledge	Whitney Seasons	TV film
2007	Flash Gordon	Layla	Episode: "Possession"
2007	Smallville	Casey Brock	Episodes: "Wrath", "Gemini"
2008	Journey to the Center of the Earth	Emily	TV film
2008	Men in Trees	Tricia	Episode: "Sonata in Three Parts"
2008	Storm Cell	Dana	TV film
2009–2011	Stargate Universe	Chloe Armstrong	Main role
2009–2010	SGU - Stargate Universe Kino	Chloe Armstrong / Airman Kelly	Web series
2013–2015	Cedar Cove	Maryellen Sherman	Main role
2014	The Originals	Genevieve	Recurring role (season 1)
2014	Transporter: The Series	Zara Knight	2 episodes
2016	Containment	Rita Sanders	Episode: Pilot
2016	Shoot the Messenger	Daisy Channing	Main role
2016	Notorious	Alexa Downey	Episode: "Friends and Other Strangers"
2017	Legends of Tomorrow	Guinevere	Episode: "Camelot/3000"
2017	Orphan Black	Detective Engers	Recurring role (season 5)
2018	The Good Doctor	Bethany Tilley	Episode: "Stories"
2019	Into The Dark	Patience	Episode: "Pilgrim"
2021	Private Eyes	Willow Maitland	3 episodes
2021	Magnum P.I.	Elena	Episode: "The Lies We Tell"
2022	The Orville	Wenda	Episode: "From Unknown Graves"
2022	Quantum Leap	Lola Gray	Episode: "O Ye of Little Faith"
2024	Earth Abides	Maurine	Main role
