= List of X-Men: Evolution characters =

The entire X-Men roster as seen in the series finale.

The series X-Men: Evolution featured a diverse cast of complicated characters. A common staple of the series was whether a particular person had chosen their allegiances correctly, with several instances of a character switching teams.

== X-Men ==
=== Teachers ===
- Professor Charles Xavier (voiced by David Kaye) is the team's telepathic mentor and financier. In the series finale, he temporarily becomes Death, one of the Horsemen of Apocalypse, and is given glimpses of the future.
- Logan / Wolverine (voiced by Scott McNeil) is a combat trainer for the X-Men who possesses superhuman strength and adamantium claws. Though similar in most ways to the classic Wolverine, he is depicted as less violent and is designed to be more of a role model for the students.
- Ororo Munroe / Storm (voiced by Kirsten Williamson), is one of the instructors and caretakers for the students. As her codename implies, is able to harness and manipulate weather. Ororo is known for her calm personality and regal manner, and she was even worshipped as a goddess in Africa due to her ability to summon the rains. In the comics, Ororo is an only child and an orphan; in Evolution, she has a sister named Vivian and a nephew, Spyke. In the series finale, she temporarily becomes Famine, one of the Horsemen of Apocalypse.
- Hank McCoy / Beast (voiced by Michael Kopsa) joins during the second season. Beast is similar to his comic counterpart in most ways, though the Evolution version speaks more casually. He was originally a gym coach and chemistry teacher at Bayville High, but joined the X-Men after the medicine he created to suppress his mutation stopped working.

=== Students ===
- Scott Summers / Cyclops (voiced by Kirby Morrow) is a leading member of the X-Men who can generate lasers from his eyes. However, he is unable to control his powers and must wear a ruby visor to prevent them from constantly activating. Contrasting with many other incarnations, Cyclops is not the aloof, doubtful loner, but a handsome and confident leader who exudes natural authority, although he is still somewhat standoffish. While the other students tend to look up to him, his competitive nature and temper get in the way at times.
- Jean Grey (voiced by Venus Terzo) is the second-in-command of the X-Men, with her and Cyclops teaching younger students at the Xavier Institute. She possesses telepathy and telekinesis that enables her to generate force fields. Unlike many mutants who began as social outcasts and came to find their horizons expanded through their association with the institute, Jean starts out from a high position of status. After the third season, Cyclops and Jean Grey began teaching the younger students at the Xavier Institute how to better control and utilize their powers. Throughout the series, it is hinted that Jean will bond with the Phoenix Force in the future.
- Kurt Wagner / Nightcrawler (voiced by Brad Swaile) is a mutant who possesses a demonic appearance and can teleport by traveling through another dimension. He is the biological son of Mystique, but was raised by foster parents in Germany. Mystique accidentally dropped Kurt over a bridge while escaping Magneto, and when she saw he had been adopted, she decided to let him remain with his foster parents. For much of the series, Nightcrawler uses a holographic image inducer to hide his appearance.
- Kitty Pryde / Shadowcat (voiced by Maggie Blue O'Hara) is a member of the X-Men who can become intangible. Throughout the series, she enters a relationship with Avalanche and develops a sibling-like friendship with Nightcrawler.
- Rogue (voiced by Meghan Black) is the adoptive daughter of Mystique, who was raised by Irene Adler in Mississippi. She possesses the ability to drain the abilities of others, but cannot control her powers and wears gloves to block them. In a flash-forward depicted in the series finale, Rogue enters a relationship with Gambit and stops wearing gloves.
- Evan Daniels / Spyke (voiced by Neil Denis) is a series-original character and Storm's nephew, with the ability to project sharp bonelike spikes from his skin. In the third and fourth seasons, Spyke loses control of his powers after accidentally drinking a sports drink called Power-8 that is poisonous to mutants, permanently manifests an indestructible exoskeleton across his body, and joins the Morlocks which are an outcast group of mutants hiding from persecution. Spyke has been compared to Marrow due to their similar powers and ties to the Morlocks, but the creators have stated that they were unaware of Marrow during the series' production.

=== New Mutants ===
As a whole, the New Mutants did not have a significant role in the series. They were added in the second season of the show to make the Xavier Institute seem more populated by having several students in the background, and primarily have supporting roles.

- Bobby Drake / Iceman (voiced by Andrew Francis), the most outgoing of the new recruits, later becomes a standby X-Man to take the place of Spyke. He can manipulate temperature, enabling him to generate and transform into ice.
- Samuel Guthrie / Cannonball (voiced by Bill Switzer) is a member of the New Mutants who can propel himself through the air at high speeds. In this state, Cannonball is nearly indestructible.
- Ray Crisp / Berzerker (voiced by Tony Sampson) is a member of the New Mutants who can generate electricity. He is a former member of the Morlocks and is depicted as less violent than his comics counterpart.
- Jubilation Lee / Jubilee (voiced by Chiara Zanni) is a rebellious and reckless member of the New Mutants who can generate plasma blasts referred to as "Fireworks". In the third season, Jubilee leaves the Xavier Institute because her parents believe it is unsafe for her and defects to the Brotherhood. She eventually returns to the X-Men in season three.
- Amara Aquilla / Magma (voiced by Alexandra Carter) is a member of the New Mutants who can manipulate the earth and emit heat. She has a somewhat haughty, "royal" attitude at times, and is easily discouraged when she does not live up to her own expectations. Magma has a physiological connection with the earth and becomes ill when separated from it for long periods of time.
- Jamie Madrox / Multiple (voiced by David A. Kaye) is a member of the New Mutants who can duplicate himself via absorbing kinetic energy. He has a hard time controlling his powers and is the subject of a running gag where he duplicates after being injured.
- Roberto Da Costa / Sunspot (voiced by Michael Coleman) is a member of the New Mutants who can absorb and manipulate solar energy. When powered up, Sunspot assumes a fiery appearance with pitch-black skin.
- Rahne Sinclair / Wolfsbane (voiced by Chantal Strand) is a Scottish member of the New Mutants who has the ability to transform into a wolf. Later in the series, she is forced to leave the institute after the world discovers the existence of mutants, though she eventually rejoins the New Mutants in a flash-forward shown in the series finale.

== Brotherhood of Mutants ==
The Brotherhood of Mutants are a group of mutant criminals and juvenile delinquents led by Magneto who are arch rivals of the X-Men throughout the series. In a flash-forward depicted in the series finale, the group's members go on to reform and join S.H.I.E.L.D.

- Raven Darkholme / Mystique (voiced by Colleen Wheeler) is a member of the Brotherhood who possesses shapeshifting abilities. In the first season, she works undercover as the principal of Bayville High and is Magneto’s second in command. Additionally, Mystique is the biological mother of Nightcrawler and the adoptive mother of Rogue. In the series finale, she becomes Pestilence, one of the Horsemen of Apocalypse.
- Todd Tolansky / Toad (voiced by Noel Fisher) is a member of the Brotherhood who possesses frog-like abilities and speaks in a stereotypical brash New York accent who often serves as comic relief. Due to his lack of physical strength or training, he often serves as a burglar or spy due to his superhuman agility and climbing ability. In season two, he develops a one sided crush on Scarlet Witch who often rebuffs his romantic advances.
- Lance Alvers / Avalanche (voiced by Christopher Grey) is the Brotherhood's field leader, who can generate seismic waves from his hands. He is often irrational and driven by his temper, but as the series progresses, he becomes more mature and pragmatic, taking on a morally ambiguous role. Additionally, he and Kitty Pryde enter a romantic relationship throughout the series which is complicated due to them being on opposite sides.
- Fred Dukes / Blob (voiced by Michael Dobson) is a former freak show performer of the Texas State Fair and a member of the Brotherhood who possesses a large, durable body and superhuman strength. He appears tough and short tempered, but is shown to have a sensitive side and acts like a protective older brother figure towards Toad.
- Pietro Maximoff / Quicksilver (voiced by Richard Ian Cox) is a member of the Brotherhood with the ability to run at superhuman speeds. Pietro is the arch rival of Spyke (Evan Daniels) whom he frames for a string of locker thefts at their high school before he is eventually caught and imprisoned by the X-Men. He is later released from jail by his father Magneto in exchange for joining the Brotherhood.
- Wanda Maximoff / Scarlet Witch (voiced by Kelly Sheridan) is Magneto's daughter and Pietro's twin sister who possesses the mutant ability to manipulate probability. Magneto previously imprisoned Wanda in an asylum due to her inability to control her powers until Mystique freed her. In the present, Wanda attempts to seek revenge against Magneto, but Mastermind manipulates her into being devoted to him.

== Acolytes ==
When the Brotherhood of Mutants fall out of Magneto's favor, he creates a new team. Though never named on-screen, they resemble the Acolytes, a team led by Magneto in the comics.

- Erik Lehnsherr / Magneto (voiced by Christopher Judge) is the leader of the Acolytes, who possesses the ability to manipulate magnetism. In the fourth season, Magneto is transformed into War, one of the Horsemen of Apocalypse, before the X-Men free him. In a flash-forward depicted in the series finale, Magneto becomes an ally to the X-Men.
- Victor Creed / Sabretooth (voiced by Michael Donovan) is a member of the Acolytes who possesses similar abilities to Wolverine, including superhuman strength and senses.
- Remy LeBeau / Gambit (voiced by Alessandro Juliani) is a member of the Acolytes who can manipulate kinetic energy to cause explosions and develops a relationship with Rogue after forcing her to help him rescue his father Jean-Luc. In a flash-forward depicted in the series finale, Gambit joins the X-Men.
- Piotr Rasputin / Colossus (voiced by Michael Adamthwaite) is a member of the Acolytes with a thick Russian accent who can transform his body into an indestructible organic metal and was forced to join after Magneto threatened to hurt his family. He later helps the X-Men fight Apocalypse and, in a flash-forward depicted in the finale, eventually joins the team.
- St. John Allerdyce / Pyro (voiced by Trevor Devall) is a mad pyromaniac with a cackling laugh and a broken Australian accent. He possesses the mutant ability to manipulate fire, but cannot generate it himself and uses flamethrower gauntlets.
- Jason Wyngarde / Mastermind (voiced by Campbell Lane) is a member of the Acolytes who possesses psychic abilities. Unlike his comic counterpart, who can only generate illusions, this version also has telepathy that enables him to manipulate memories.

== Other mutants ==
- Tabitha Smith / Boom-Boom (voiced by Megan Leitch) is a former member of the New Mutants who left to join the Brotherhood of Mutants due to feeling out of place in the former group. She possesses the mutant ability to create energy 'time bombs' that she can detonate at will.
- The Morlocks are a group of mutants who live underground due to their mutations being impossible to hide.
  - Callisto (voiced by Saffron Henderson) is the leader of the Morlocks and possesses enhanced senses.
  - Caliban (voiced by Michael Dobson) is a member of the Morlocks who can detect the presence of other mutants.
  - Cybelle is a member of the Morlocks who can generate acid.
  - Torpid is a young member of the Morlocks who possesses large hands and a paralyzing touch.
  - Facade is a member of the Morlocks who possesses camouflage.
  - Lucid (voiced by Lee Tockar) is a member of the Morlocks who resembles a humanoid lizard and can see through solid objects.
  - Scaleface is a member of the Morlocks who can transform into a dragon-like creature.
- X-23 (voiced by Andrea Libman in the episode "X-23", Britt Irvin in "Target X") is a female clone of Wolverine who was raised since birth to serve Hydra as an assassin. In a flash-forward depicted in the series finale, X-23 joins the X-Men.
- Warren Worthington III / Angel (voiced by Mark Hildreth) is a young multi-millionaire who possesses an angel-like appearance. He attempts to become a vigilante using his mutant ability of flight, but stops after his actions garnered negative attention from Magneto. Warren eventually joins the X-Men during their battle with Apocalypse.
- Forge (voiced by Sam Vincent) is a Bayville High student and mutant inventor from the late 1970s who was trapped in a pocket dimension for decades. In the present, Nightcrawler frees Forge after accidentally being transported to the same dimension.
- Alex Summers / Havok (voiced by Matt Hill) is Cyclops's younger brother, who was adopted by the Masters family and believed to be dead. Magneto manipulates Alex into assisting him, but he eventually leaves him and chooses to remain neutral, staying in Hawaii to become a surfer.
- Danielle Moonstar (voiced by Tabitha St. Germain) is a Native American mutant who befriends Kitty. Her powers of psychic projection exposed the fears of her neighbors, causing them to move away and leaving her and her grandfather the only residents of a ghost town.
- Irene Adler / Destiny (voiced by Ellen Kennedy) is a blind mutant and close friend of Mystique, who entrusted her with raising Rogue.
- Dorian Leech (voiced by Danny McKinnon) is a young mutant who can nullify superpowers in a radius around him. In the series finale, Rogue uses his powers to vanquish Apocalypse.

== Hydra ==
- Viper (voiced by Lisa Ann Beley) is the leader of Hydra.
- Omega Red (voiced by Richard Newman) is an operative of Hydra and former member of Weapon X. He has a previous history with Wolverine.
- Gauntlet (voiced by Mark Gibbon) is a member of Hydra who possesses superhuman strength and senses. He has access to a wide array of tools and equipment that make him a formidable opponent and tracker.

== Other villains ==
- En Sabah Nur / Apocalypse (voiced by David Kaye) is an ancient mutant who was raised by bandits after being abandoned as a baby and sealed in a pyramid following a failed attempt to transform all humans into mutants. In the present, Apocalypse escapes, but is defeated and sent far from Earth.
- Vincent / Mesmero (voiced by Ron Halder) is a mutant with the ability to control the minds of others and a servant of Apocalypse. Unlike his comics counterpart, he has green tattoos rather than entirely green skin.
- Cain Marko / Juggernaut (voiced by Paul Dobson) is an independent villain who possesses immense strength and durability. Unlike the comics, he is Charles Xavier's half-brother rather than his stepbrother and is a mutant rather than deriving his powers from the entity Cyttorak.
- David Haller (voiced by Kyle Labine) is the son of Charles Xavier, who possesses multiple personalities and powers. The dominant personality, Lucas, hates Xavier and believes that he abandoned him in favor of other mutants.
- Bolivar Trask (voiced by John Novak) is a former member of S.H.I.E.L.D. and the creator of the Sentinels, a group of mutant-hunting robots. He is arrested, but later freed to help combat Apocalypse.
- Edward Kelly (voiced by Dale Wilson) is the second principal of Bayville High following Mystique's disappearance. He later runs for mayor of Bayville, competing with the falsely heroic Brotherhood for media attention.
- Duncan Matthews (voiced by Vincent Gale) is a jockish football player. When mutants are revealed to the public, Duncan begins terrorizing them and briefly allies with the Brotherhood of Mutants before being arrested.
- Hungan (voiced by Blu Mankuma) is a witch doctor from Storm's tribe. He is jealous of Storm because her powers over the weather made her a more venerable idol in their African village.

== Other characters ==
- Amanda Sefton (voiced by Moneca Stori) is Kurt Wagner's human girlfriend. She later discovers that he is a mutant, but remains attracted to him.
- Margali Szardos (voiced by Teryl Rothery) is Amanda Sefton's mother, who forbids her from seeing Kurt after he and Toad get into a fight that wrecks much of her house.
- Webber Torque / Arcade (voiced by Gabe Khouth) is a freshman student who Mystique manipulates into helping her access Cerebro.
- Gabrielle Haller (voiced by Stevie Vallance) is Professor Xavier's ex-wife and the mother of David Haller / Legion. The two married young and divorced because Xavier dedicated too much time to his study of mutants. Unbeknownst to him, Gabrielle was pregnant at the time of their separation and raised David by herself.
- Paul (voiced by Neil Denis) is a schoolmate and friend of Scott Summers. He made several appearances in the series, the last a look of utter bewilderment when the existence of mutants was revealed.
- Taryn Fujioka (voiced by Janyse Jaud) is a Japanese American girl who has a crush on Scott. At first, she is Jean's best friend, but when Jean starts to develop feelings for Scott herself, becomes her rival. When Scott is outed as a mutant, Taryn shuns him.
- Steve Rogers / Captain America was a government-sponsored superhero who gained powers from a super-soldier serum and fought for the Allies in World War II. With Wolverine's help, he liberated the Auschwitz concentration camp and rescued a young Magneto. Later, he was cryogenically frozen to prevent the serum's effects from killing him.
- Nick Fury (voiced by Jim Byrnes) is the leader of the government agency S.H.I.E.L.D.
- Agatha Harkness (voiced by Pauline Newstone) is a witch who helps Scarlet Witch train to master her powers. Later in the series, Nightcrawler visits Harkness in an attempt to restore Mystique after Apocalypse petrifies her.
- Deborah Risman (voiced by Lisa Ann Beley) is a scientist affiliated with Weapon X and Hydra who helped create X-23. After X-23 escapes, Risman defects to S.H.I.E.L.D., who she hopes can recapture her. When X-23 was adapted into the comics, Risman was replaced with a similar character named Sarah Kinney.
- Pharaoh Rama-Tut was a pharaoh in ancient Egypt. He attempted to eliminate Apocalypse, only to be overthrown by him and forced to flee.
