= 2030 CE =

- Also known as: AD 2030
- Genre: Biopunk; Cyberpunk; Science fiction; Teen drama
- Created by: Angela Bruce; Dennis Foon; Yan Moore
- Starring: Corey Sevier; Jessica Lucas; Curtis Harrison; Tatiana Maslany; Neil Denis; Elyse Levesque; Skye Kneller
- Country of origin: Canada
- Original language: English
- No. of seasons: 2
- No. of episodes: 26

Production
- Production locations: Winnipeg, Manitoba, Canada
- Production companies: Angela Bruce Productions; Buffalo Gal Pictures; Yan Moore Productions Ltd.; Minds Eye Entertainment; Minds Eye International

Original release
- Network: YTV
- Release: February 6, 2002 – April 3, 2003

2030 CE is a Canadian science fiction, teen drama that aired for two seasons on YTV from 2002-2003. It aired in the United States on Showtime Family Zone. The series was created by Angela Bruce, Dennis Foon and Yan Moore. A third season had been planned, but was cancelled after financial supporters backed out, presumably due to low ratings. It was filmed in Winnipeg, Manitoba.

== Plot ==
In the year 2030 C.E., no one since 2002 has lived past the age of thirty in a semi-post-apocalyptic, dystopian Earth, due to Progressive Ageing Syndrome (P.A.S.).

Science, government, and industry united to form Nexes, an all-powerful body that controls every aspect of society. In order to make up for their short life spans, and to continue to have a progressive society, people are assigned careers at a young age and put through intensive schooling specific to their assigned careers - they graduate and start work at age 14 as experts in their field, but ignorant about almost anything else. The result is that no one has enough knowledge to see the full picture, or question the world around them, leaving those few people in charge of Nexes with absolute power.

Nexes was meant to be a temporary solution, working to find a cure for P.A.S. so that life could return to the way it was. Aware that a cure will mean the end of their absolute rule, the powers that be within Nexes are not doing any research on the disease. Unfortunately for them, humanity is attempting to cure itself - people are being born in whom the P.A.S mutation are not present. In order to stop others from noticing, Nexes moves these people into dangerous career paths, and makes sure that they are dead before they become old enough for the disease to have affected them.

The show follows Hart Greyson, a 15-year-old boy who was training to be a doctor. Upon his graduation at the top of his class, he is told that a genetic flaw has been discovered within him, making him unsuitable for a medical career. Instead he is assigned to be an Eco-Tech, an extremely dangerous job in which he will likely be killed before he turns 20. Knowing that he does not have the flaw he has been accused of, Hart starts to look more closely at the operation of Nexes, and realizes that it is corrupt. He joins Storm, a small team of rebels that is attempting to cure P.A.S and destroy Nexes.

== Cast and characters ==
- Corey Sevier as Hart Greyson – Age 15, smart, athletic, and funny. When he is told upon his graduation that a genetic flaw has made him unsuitable for a medical career and is assigned to an extremely dangerous job as an Eco-Tech, Hart begins an investigation into the operations of Nexes and joins the Storm, a rebel group trying to cure P.A.S. and destroy Nexes.
- Jessica Lucas as Jakki Kaan – Age 15, free spirit, fearless and bright. Jakki is a member of the Storm and also one of the first long-term contacts that Hart makes. She is in the fight for several reasons, but mostly to find her lover, Dax, another of the people that Nexes has made an effort to eliminate.
- Curtis Harrison as Zeus – Age 19, technical genius who takes up leadership of the storm after blaming himself for a failed mission. Shares a mysterious past with Dr. Rich.
- Tatiana Maslany as Rome Greyson – Age 12, hip, open-minded, a whiz with the computer. Rome is Hart's younger sister, is a genetics genius and also very talented with computer operations. She becomes a strong ally in Hart's quest to discover the truth.
- Neil Denis as Robby Drake – Age 15, Hart's best friend.
- Elyse Levesque as Dr. Maxine Rich – Age 19, all charm on the outside, she is as hard as steel on the inside. She is smart, savvy, and shrewd. As a leading member of Nexes, she is not to be trusted and serves as the main antagonist of the series.
- Skye Kneller as Quixote – Age unknown, a girl who looks to be 12. Often comes to the aid of Hart, seemingly possessing magical powers with the ability to disappear at will and disable securities with the wave of a hand. Although seemingly benevolent, Quixote's motives are dubious at best, and she sometimes shows a sadistic side. She ends the series, enigmatically saying, after being rejoined by another Quixote: "One Quixote, two Quixote, three Quixote, four, and more, and more. We're taking over" to which Zeus replies "I have a bad feeling about this".

== Episodes ==
=== Season 1 ===
- 1x01: Happy Destiny Day/ 6 February 2002
- 1x02: Ch-Ch-Ch-Changes/ 13 February 2002
- 1x03: First Assignment/ 20 February 2002
- 1x04: Cat and Mouse/ 27 February 2002
- 1x05: The Lord Helps Those Who Help Themselves/ 6 March 2002
- 1x06: Free Jake/ 13 March 2002
- 1x07: Strange Medicine/ 20 March 2002
- 1x08: The Whole Truth/ 27 March 2002
- 1x09: Do You Know who Your Friends Are?/ 3 April 2002
- 1x10: Live Bait/10 April 2002
- 1x11: Trial and Punishment/ 17 April 2002
- 1x12: Into the Lion's Lair/ 24 April 2002
- 1x13: Plan B/ 1 May 2002

=== Season 2 ===
- 2x01: Where's Robby?/ 9 January 2003
- 2x02: Free Robby/ 16 January 2003
- 2x03: The Defector/ 23 January 2003
- 2x04: Get Victor/ 30 January 2003
- 2x05: The Ghost/ 6 February 2003
- 2x06: The One That Got Away/ 13 February 2003
- 2x07: Blood and Ice/ 20 February 2003
- 2x08: Faint Hope Clause/ 27 February 2003
- 2x09: The Saboteur/ 6 March 2003
- 2x10: Prisoners/ 13 March 2003
- 2x11: Batteries Not Included/ 20 March 2003
- 2x12: Endgame/ 27 March 2003
- 2x13: Reunion/ 3 April 2003
