= DinoSquad =

- Genre: Action/Adventure; Superhero
- Developed by: Jeffrey Scott
- Voices of: Benjamin Beck; Dana Donlan; Nils Haaland; Ian Eli Lee; Moira Mangiameli; Vincent Michael; Kelcey Watson
- Theme music composer: Ron Wasserman
- Composer: Ron Wasserman
- Country of origin: United States
- Original language: English
- No. of seasons: 2
- No. of episodes: 26

Production
- Executive producers: Andy Heyward; Michael Maliani
- Editors: Robert Brousseau; Jo Martin
- Running time: 22 minutes
- Production company: DIC Entertainment Corporation (Note: Although the Cookie Jar logo appeared on the second season, DIC still produced that season before the purchase. Animation outsourced to Suzhou Hong Yang Cartoon Company Limited.)

Original release
- Network: CBS (KEWLopolis)
- Release: November 3, 2007 – December 6, 2008

DinoSquad is an American animated series that was produced by DIC Entertainment and aired on the KEWLopolis block on CBS from November 3, 2007 to December 6, 2008.

The show is about five teenagers, consisting of Max, Roger, Fiona, Buzz and Caruso, each with the power to turn into a respective dinosaur. They use this power to fight the evil business magnate named Victor Veloci, who is intent on returning the world to the age of dinosaurs by turning humans and animals into new mutant dinosaurs and accelerating global warming. The series is also used to help teach viewers about many life lessons, such as how to deal with bullies, the effect humans have on the environment, and responsibility.

This show, along with Sushi Pack and Horseland, were the final three series produced by DIC before their acquisition with Cookie Jar Entertainment, who produced the second and final season of DinoSquad until the series ended its run in 2008. Cookie Jar (along with most of the DiC library) would be acquired by DHX Media (now known as WildBrain) in 2012.

== Premise ==
Set in Kittery Point, Maine, on a school field trip to the tide pools, five teenagers, Max, Roger, Caruso, Fiona, and Buzz, leap into the ocean to save a dog, Rump, from a shark attack. Victor Veloci, the owner of a biogenetics company called Raptor Dyne and a shapeshifting Velociraptor disguised as a human, releases a mutagenic orange substance called primordial ooze into the tide pools with the goal of reverting every living thing back to their early evolutions. The ooze mutates the DNA of the five teenagers, giving them the ability to turn into dinosaurs. Their mysterious science teacher, Ms. Moynihan reveals herself as another shapeshifting Velociraptor and telepathically shows the teens that when the asteroid that killed the dinosaurs hit the Earth, she and Victor survived, trapped in a cave. Over millions of years, their DNA mutated and gave them shapeshifting powers, and they integrated themselves into society, keeping their identities secret.

Victor Veloci ultimately seeks to take advantage of global warming and return the earth to the Mesozoic era under the belief that dinosaurs are superior. Ms. Moynihan believes that humans are superior because they gained dominance, evolved for reason and love rather than brute force and does what she can to hinder Victor from the shadows. Victor seeks to capture the Dino Squad in their dinosaur forms because they are perfectly formed dinosaurs rather than temporary mutations, but he does not know that they have human forms, and so he continuously mutates wild animals into dinosaurs with his primordial ooze to draw them out and try to capture them. Besides their world-saving duties, Max, Roger, Caruso, Fiona, and Buzz also need to deal with high school and typical teenage drama. To turn animals and other living things back to normal from the primordial ooze, they use the DNA Chiller, which causes the mutant DNA to come out from freezing, and then using the Devolver to vacuum it out.

== Characters ==
=== Dino Squad members ===
- Joanne Moynihan: A science teacher and the founder of the Dino Squad, she is a Velociraptor who survived the extinction of the dinosaurs with Victor Veloci and gained a human form, keeping her and Veloci's identities secret and has telepathic abilities that enable her to communicate with the Squad's members. She believes that humans are superior because they evolved for reason and love rather than brute force. In episode 13, "Pet Peeve", she adopts a budgerigar.
- Rolf Maxwell (Max) (voiced by Ian Eli Lee): A hunky, 18-year-old high school senior in Ms. Moynihan's class, he is the team leader and captain of the football team. His dinosaur form is a Tyrannosaurus. In episode 13, "Pet Peeve", he adopts a hamster.
- Roger Blair (voiced by Kelcey Watson): An African-American high school senior in Ms. Moynihan's class, he is very smart and has a prankster streak. He is able to come up with gadgets even though his creations fail at first. He is somewhat arrogant like Caruso, but always helps the team when duty calls. He has a younger brother named Mikey. His dinosaur form is a combination of a Triceratops and a Styracosaurus. In episode 13, "Pet Peeve", he adopts a turtle.
- Erwin Caruso (voiced by Benjamin Beck): A handsome high school senior in Ms. Moynihan's class, he is vain and obsessed with the idea of fame, as well as his "good looks". He can be a pain sometimes though as his selfishness and arrogance hurt the team, but he did prove himself worthy to the squad in episode 23. In that same episode, he is revealed to have created his own line of moisturizers. He also practices yoga. His dinosaur form is a Stegosaurus. In episode 13, "Pet Peeve", he attempts and fails to make an Internet web show about pets, before adopting a goldfish.
- Fiona Flagstaff (voiced by Dana Donlan): A high school senior in Ms. Moynihan's class, she is the only female on the Squad (with the exception of Ms. Moynihan), and has a penchant for fast things like rollerblades or race cars. Fiona is the squad's resident mechanic and gear head, and is also a tomboy. She also has a younger sister named Terri and a grandfather named Irish. In episode 19, "Never Judge a Dinosaur by its Cover", it is revealed that she is allergic to spider bites. Her dinosaur form is a Spinosaurus. In episode 13, "Pet Peeve", she adopts a domestic rabbit.
- Neil Buzmati (Buzz) (voiced by Nils Haaland): A high school senior in Ms. Moynihan's class, he is 17, then turned 18. He is the youngest member of the team, and the "punk" kid, who is scared of his own shadow. He is known to be an animal lover, as shown several times throughout the series, and especially shows affection for small animals traditionally considered "gross", such as rats, snakes, cockroaches, and spiders. Buzz is anything but a coward when he is needed in action. He also owns a pet Python snake. His dinosaur form is a Pteranodon.
- Rump is the Dino Squad's mischievous pet Bull Terrier. He can transform into a creature that looks like a hybrid between a Gorgonopsid and a modern dog. He usually gives Caruso a hard time, such as in the first episode, "The Beginning" as a stray dog and took his jacket, only to be rescued by the team from a shark attack, and the episode "Runaway Ugly", when he ate his cupcake.

=== Supporting characters ===
Terri Flagstaff (voiced by Sarah Heinke) is Fiona's brainy younger sister, but she is initially jealous of Fiona. Although she may be as intellectual as Roger, she has also exercised substandard judgment. Unlike her sister, she has lighter skin and wears glasses. She only appears in three episodes.

=== Minor characters ===
Mikey Blair is Roger's younger brother who only appears in episodes 13 and 24.

=== One-time characters ===
- Liam is an autistic student who only appeared in episode 14.
- Mrs. Carrel is Fiona's neighbor who only appeared in episode 19.
- Irish Flagstaff is Fiona's grandfather who only appeared in episode 13.
- Peter is Veloci's assistant who only appears in the first episode.

=== Raptor Dyne ===
- Victor Veloci (voiced by Vincent Michael) is the main antagonist of the series. He is a scientist and a business magnate who owns Raptor Dyne and Ms. Moynihan's rival. Originally a Velociraptor who survived the extinction of the dinosaurs, both Veloci and Ms. Moynihan kept their identities secret when they gained the ability to assume a human form, and believes that dinosaurs are superior and intends to revert Earth back to its prehistoric state and accelerate global warming to facilitate the return of dinosaurs as the dominant species by using his modern technology and mutagenic primordial ooze to mutate the DNA of humans and animals to transform them into dinosaurs. He also seeks to capture the Dino Squad members in their dinosaur forms not knowing they are actually humans because they are perfectly formed dinosaurs.
- Henchman: Veloci's goons, they wear dinosaur-shaped helmets with faceplates as part of their uniform, and ride dinosaur-themed vehicles. In episode 23, Caruso dresses up as one to fake out Veloci's real henchmen.

== Development ==
The series was first announced as a programme for DIC and CBS' Saturday-morning cartoon block (which would be named to KEWLopolis later on) in April 2007, under the name of I Was a High School Dinosaur.

== Episodes ==
=== Series overview ===
Season	Episodes	Originally released	
Season	Episodes	First released	Last released
1	13	November 3, 2007	February 23, 2008
2	13	September 13, 2008	December 6, 2008

=== Season 1 (2007–2008) ===
No. overall	No. in season	Title	Written by	Original release date	Prod. code	K6–11 rating/share
1	1	"The Beginning"	Jeffrey Scott	November 3, 2007	BY010–101	0.4/2
2	2	"Growth Potential"	Robert N. Skir	November 10, 2007	BY010–102	0.6/3
3	3	"Tangled Web"	Michael Ryan	November 17, 2007	BY010–103	N/A
4	4	"T-Rex Formation"	Jeffrey Scott	November 24, 2007	BY010–104	N/A
5	5	"Who Let the Dog Out?"	Robert N. Skir	December 1, 2007	BY010–105	0.1/1
6	6	"Bully 4 U"	Michael Scott	December 8, 2007	BY010–106	0.6/2
7	7	"The Lost Worldwide Web"	Jeffrey Scott	December 15, 2007	BY010–107	0.1/1
8	8	"Headline Nuisance"	Robert N. Skin	December 22, 2007	BY010–108	N/A
9	9	"Who'll Stop the Rain?"	Michael Ryan	December 29, 2007	BY010–109	N/A
10	10	"Zoom in on Zoom"	Jeffrey Scott	February 2, 2008	BY010–110	0.3/1
11	11	"A Mole Lotta Trouble"	Robert N. Skir	February 9, 2008	BY010–111	N/A
12	12	"The Not so Great Outdoors"	Michael Ryan	February 16, 2008	BY010–112	0.6/2
13	13	"Pet Peeve"	Jeffrey Scott	February 23, 2008	BY010–113	0.4/2

=== Season 2 (2008) ===
No. overall	No. in season	Title	Written by	Original release date	Prod. code	K6–11 rating/share
14	1	"The World According to Liam"	Robert N. Skir	September 13, 2008	BY010–114	0.4/2
15	2	"Runaway Ugly"	Michael Ryan	September 20, 2008	BY010–115	0.5/2
16	3	"Attack of the Brain-A-Saurus"	Jeffrey Scott	September 27, 2008	BY010–116	N/A
17	4	"Wannabe"	Robert N. Skir	October 4, 2008	BY010–117	N/A
18	5	"Fire and Ice"	Jeffrey Scott	October 11, 2008	BY010–118	0.3/2
19	6	"Never Judge a Dinosaur by its Cover"	Jeffrey Scott	October 18, 2008	BY010–119	0.3/1
20	7	"Easy Riders and Raging Dinos"	Robert N. Skir	October 25, 2008	BY010–120	0.3/1
21	8	"One Percent Inspiration"	Michael Ryan	November 1, 2008	BY010–121	0.5/2
22	9	"How Loa Can you Goa?"	Jeffrey Scott	November 8, 2008	BY010–122	0.5/2
23	10	"Scents and Scents Ability"	Robert N. Skir	November 15, 2008	BY010–123	0.2/1
24	11	"I Think I Can't, I Think I Can't"	Jeffrey Scott	November 22, 2008	BY010–124	0.4/2
25	12	"Preservance"	Michael Ryan	November 29, 2008	BY010–125	N/A
26	13	"The Trojan Dinosaur"	Jeffrey Scott	December 6, 2008	BY010–126	0.4/2

== Broadcast history ==
DinoSquad originally aired on CBS on the KEWLopolis block until being removed during the blocks rebranding to Cookie Jar TV in 2009.

Season 2 episodes began airing online on August 4, 2008, before airing on CBS on September 13.

The series later reaired on the syndicated Cookie Jar Kids Network block, and on This TV's Cookie Jar Toons block from 2011 until the block's end in 2013.

== Home media and streaming ==
From April 2009 until July 2010, NCircle Entertainment released five DVDs of the series, each containing three episodes (except for the last volume, which has four).

DVD/VHS name	Episodes	Release date
Go Dino!	The Beginning; Growth Potential; T-Rex Transformation	April 14, 2009
Raptor Attack!	Tangled Web; Zoom In On Zoom; Who'll Stop the Rain	April 14, 2009
Prehistoric Problems!	The Lost World Wide Web; Headline Nuisance; Who Let The Dog Out	August 18, 2009
Mutant Mayhem!	A Mole Lotta Trouble; Pet Peeve; The Not So Great Outdoors	February 2, 2010
Fire & Ice!	Bully 4 U Fire & Ice; One Percent Inspiration; Howa Loa Can You Goa	July 13, 2010

The series was also available to stream on Netflix from September 2014 until January 1, 2018, and is currently available to stream through Kid Genius and CONtv. In Australia, the series is available on Stan.
