= Curtis Harrison =

Canadian actor (born 1978)

Curtis Harrison (born December 31, 1978, in Welland, Ontario) is a Canadian actor. Harrison co-starred in the Sci-Fi series 2030 CE and played Steve Podborski, one of the skiers known as Crazy Canucks, in the CTV film Crazy Canucks.
