= Kirsten Williamson =

Canadian actress (born 1969)

- Born: 1969 (age 56–57); Canada
- Occupation: Actress

Kirsten Williamson (born 1969), also professionally known as Kirsten Alter, is a Canadian actress. She voices the character Ororo Munroe in the animated television series, X-Men: Evolution. She also had a role as Tammy in RV. Kirsten has also appeared in Jeremiah, Da Vinci's Inquest, and Da Vinci's City Hall. Kirsten had small roles in The Last Mimzy, in Juno as a maternity room nurse, and also in Fifty Shades Freed.

Kirsten is of black African, through her father and English origin, through her mother.
