= Neil Denis =

Canadian actor

- Years active: 1995–present

Neil Denis is a Canadian actor best known for his role as Rya'c, Teal'c's son, in Stargate SG-1. His first appearance was in University Hospital in 1995 at age ten. He is also known for his roles as Robby Drake in 2030 CE, Spyke in X-Men: Evolution, and Jose Merel in A Girl Like Me: The Gwen Araujo Story.

== Filmography ==
=== Television ===
| Year | Title | Role | Notes |
|---|---|---|---|
| 1995 | University Hospital | Danny | Episode: "You Can Run..." |
| 1996 | The X-Files | Catcher | Episode: "Home" |
| 1997 | The Sentinel | Carjacker Kid | Episode: "Three Point Shot" |
| 1997 | A Call to Remember | George Hicks | Television film |
| 1997–2004 | Stargate SG-1 | Rya'c | 6 episodes |
| 1998 | Big and Hairy | Kid | Television film |
| 1998 | Max Q | Michael Daniels | Television film |
| 1998 | The Inspectors | Will | Television film |
| 1998 | Dead Man's Gun | Arthur John | Episode: "Winner Take All" |
| 1998 | Goosebumps | Todd Erikson | Episode: "Chillogy" |
| 1999 | Zenon: Girl of the 21st Century | Leo | Television film |
| 2000 | Frankie & Hazel | Abdul | Television film |
| 2000 | First Wave | Skater | Episode: "Mabus" |
| 2000 | Out of Time | Sean | Television film |
| 2000 | Seven Days | Morgan | Episode: "The Backstepper's Apprentice" |
| 2000–2003 | X-Men: Evolution | Evan Daniels / Spyke (voice) | 26 episodes |
| 2002 | Living with the Dead | Dennis Branston | Television film |
| 2002–2003 | 2030 CE | Robby Drake | 7 episodes |
| 2004 | The Life | Student #2 | Television film |
| 2004 | Zolar | Hanson | Television film |
| 2004 | Romeo! | Stash | Episode: "A Matter of Principal" |
| 2006 | Alice, I Think | Abelard | 2 episodes |
| 2006 | The Dead Zone | Teenage Clerk | Episode: "Into the Heart of Darkness" |
| 2006 | A Girl Like Me: The Gwen Araujo Story | Jose Merel | Television film |
| 2008 | Loch Ness Terror | Chad | Television film |

=== Film ===
| Year | Title | Role | Notes |
|---|---|---|---|
| 1998 | National Lampoon's Golf Punks | Thork | |
| 2002 | Spooky House | Child in Audience | |
| 2002 | Tribe of Joseph | Phillipe | |
| 2005 | Fetching Cody | Sudden | |
