= Steven E. Gordon =

American animator (born 1960)

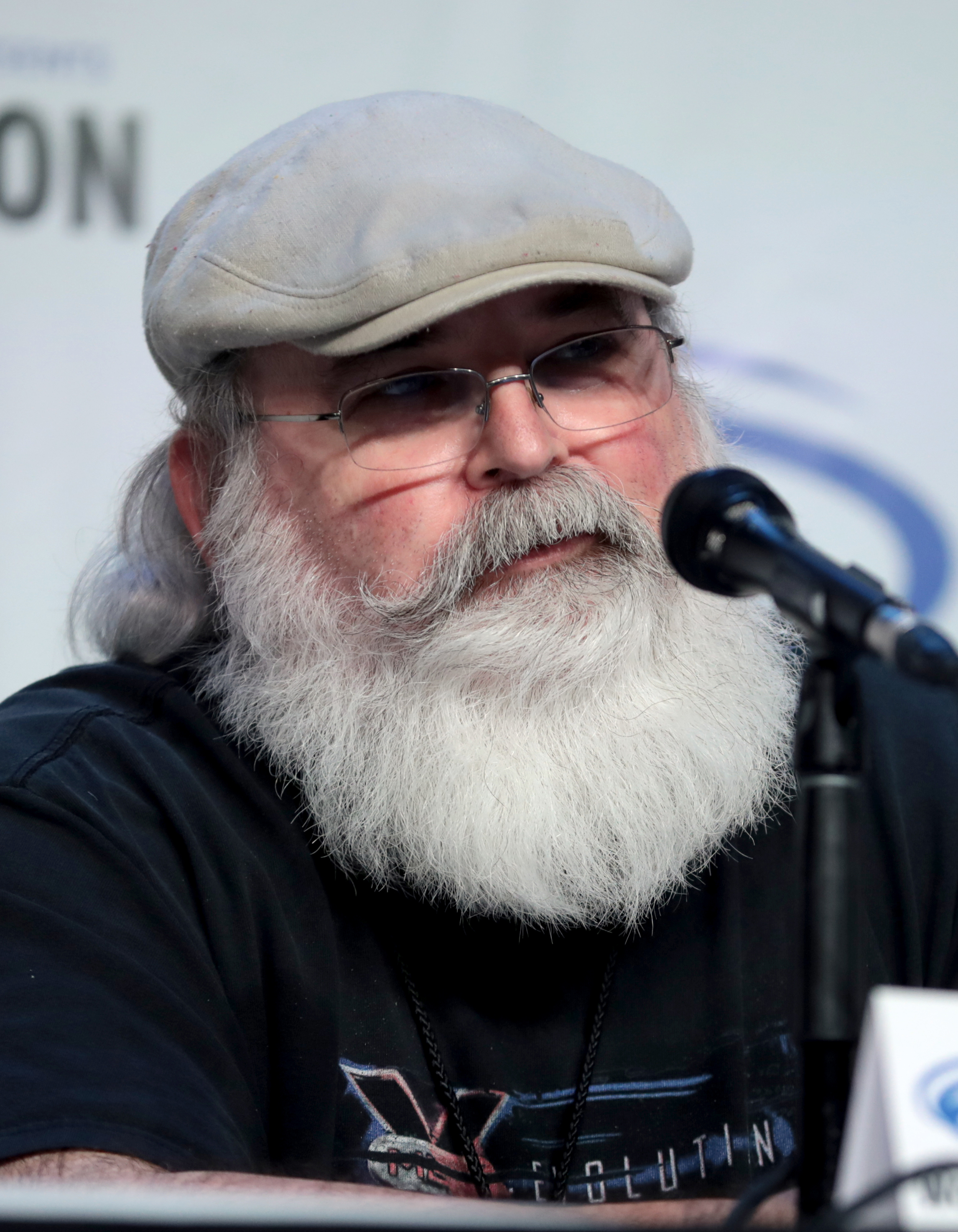
- Gordon at the 2022 WonderCon
- Born: March 23, 1960 (age 66); California, United States
- Occupations: Animator, film director, comic artist, character designer
- Website: www.stevenegordon.com

Steven Eric Gordon (born March 23, 1960) is an American film director, character designer and animator, who worked with animation film director Ralph Bakshi and on X-Men: Evolution.

== Career ==
=== Ralph Bakshi ===
He started in animation working on Ralph Bakshi's animated feature Lord of the Rings as a "roto-photo" artist while in high school. He then worked as an assistant animator and eventually animated (roto-scoped) several scenes and was given animator credit on the finished film. He worked for Bakshi on and off for years on films including American Pop and Fire and Ice (as animation director and character designer) working alongside Frank Frazetta and Cool World (as Key Animator on Holli and Lonette).

=== Marvel ===
Gordon was one of the directors on the first Marvel/Lionsgate direct-to-video films, Ultimate Avengers, as well as the character designer for that project and its sequel. He was also one of the directors for the TV series Wolverine and the X-Men. He directed the direct-to-DVD film Stan Lee presents: The Condor featuring Wilmer Valderrama. He was an uncredited storyboard artist on the feature film Terminator Salvation and a director on the second animated TV show The Avengers for Marvel and Starz.

=== Later career ===
In 2009, he co-directed the direct-to-video sequel to Happily N'ever After at Vanguard Animation alongside Boyd Kirkland. It was called Happily N'ever After 2: Snow White Another Bite @ The Apple and it turned out to be a hit on DVD. Over one million copies were sold.

He worked as Supervising Director on Voltron Force airing on Nicktoons for Kickstart and WEP Productions. He was one of the directors for Pigs Next Door, an un-aired animated series produced by Saban Productions featuring the voices of John Goodman and Jaime Lee Curtis.

He was the animation director, storyboard artist, key animator and character designer on The Swan Princess. He also worked on Space Jam: A New Legacy. In addition, he worked on Tom and Jerry: The Movie and with the company of Don Bluth on Anastasia and Titan A.E..

He illustrates a webcomic based on The Eternal Savage, available on the website of Edgar Rice Burroughs, Inc. In February 2013, Sequential Pulp Comics, a graphic novel imprint distributed by Dark Horse Comics announced that Gordon was one of the illustrators of Jungle Tales of Tarzan, written by Martin Powell.

== Filmography ==
=== As director ===
==== Film ====
| Year | Title | Notes |
|---|---|---|
| 2006 | Ultimate Avengers: The Movie | |
| 2007 | The Condor | |
| 2009 | Happily N'Ever After 2: Snow White—Another Bite @ the Apple | Credited as Steve Gordon |

==== Television ====
| Year | Title | Notes |
|---|---|---|
| 1987 | Mighty Mouse: The New Adventures | 2 episodes Credited as Steve Gordon |
| 2000 | Pigs Next Door | 6 episodes Unaired |
| 2000–2002 | X-Men: Evolution | 10 episodes Nominated – Annie Award for Outstanding Individual Achievement for Production Design in an Animated Television Production |
| 2008 | Wolverine and the X-Men | 8 episodes Credited as Steve Gordon |
| 2011 | Voltron Force | 11 episodes Supervising director |
| 2012 | The Avengers: Earth's Mightiest Heroes | 7 episodes |
| 2013 | NFL Rush Zone | 5 episodes |
| 2024 | Ariel | 3 episodes |
