= Robert N. Skir =

American writer (born 1961)

Skir at the 2026 L.A. Comic Con

Robert N. Skir (born 3 January 1961) is a writer best known for his work in television animation on shows including X-Men: The Animated Series, Gargoyles, Batman: The Animated Series, and Spider-Man: The Animated Series. He co-created and served as Story Editor on programs including Transformers: Beast Machines, Extreme Ghostbusters, Godzilla: The Series, and DinoSquad, and co-developed the series X-Men: Evolution. From 1991 to 2003, he frequently collaborated with Marty Isenberg.

His work on the series Beast Machines: Transformers was highly controversial, gaining favor among new viewers but polarizing many—but not all—longtime Transformers fans. Since then, the show has gained a cult following, consisting partially of fans who rejected the show when it first aired. there also rumors where he's received Death threat from fans His short story "Singularity Ablyss" was published in the anthology Transformers: Legends.

Skir's work on the Pocket Dragon Adventures episode "Festival of Lights" earned him a nomination for the Humanitas Award.

Skir has taught numerous classes in Animation Writing at UCLA's Department of Film, Television, and Digital Media.

== Television credits ==
Series head writer denoted in bold

- Beetlejuice (1991)
- Little Shop (1991)
- Batman: The Animated Series (1992, 1994)
- Dog City (1992–1994)
- The Legends of Treasure Island (1993)
- Stone Protectors (1993)
- X-Men: The Animated Series (1993–1994)
- Red Planet (1994)
- Spider-Man: The Animated Series (1994, 1996–1997)
- BattleTech: The Animated Series (1995)
- **Ultraforce** (1995): eps 10-13
- Gargoyles (1996)
- The Mask: Animated Series (1996)
- Superman: The Animated Series (1996)
- **Mighty Ducks: The Animated Series** (1996–1997)
- Extreme Ghostbusters (1997)
- The Adventures of Sam & Max: Freelance Police (1997–1998)
- Pocket Dragon Adventures (1998)
- **Godzilla: The Series** (1998–2000)
- **Beast Machines: Transformers** (1999–2000)
- **Action Man** (2000–2001)
- The Mummy (2001, 2003)
- DinoSquad (2007–2008)
- Transformers: Prime (2012)
- Kaijudo (2013)
- Super Monsters (2017)
- Tarzan and Jane (2018)
