= X-Men: Evolution =

American superhero animated television series

- Genre: Superhero; Action-adventure; Drama
- Created by: Marty Isenberg; Robert N. Skir; David Wise
- Based on: X-Men by: Stan Lee; Jack Kirby
- Developed by: John Bush; John W. Hyde; Jon Vein
- Voices of: Meghan Black; Neil Denis; David Kaye; Scott McNeil; Kirby Morrow; Maggie Blue O'Hara; Brad Swaile; Venus Terzo; Kirsten Williamson; Michael Kopsa
- Composer: William Kevin Anderson
- Country of origin: United States
- Original language: English
- No. of seasons: 4
- No. of episodes: 52 (list of episodes)

Production
- Executive producers: Avi Arad; Rick Ungar; Stan Lee
- Producers: Boyd Kirkland; Greg Johnson (season 4)
- Animators: Madhouse; Mook Animation; DR Movie
- Editors: Al Breitenbach (season 1); Mark T Collins (seasons 3–4)
- Running time: 20–22 minutes
- Production companies: Film Roman; Marvel Studios (Note: Animation outsourced to Madhouse, Mook DLE, and DR Movie.)

Original release
- Network: Kids' WB
- Release: November 4, 2000 – October 25, 2003

X-Men: Evolution is an American animated television series based on the superhero comic book series X-Men published by Marvel Comics. Taking inspiration from the early issues of the original comics, the series portrays the X-Men as teenagers rather than adults, following their struggle to control their mutant powers as they face various threats and backlash.

Produced in the United States, the voice recording was done in Canada; and the show was animated in Japan and South Korea. The series was distributed by Warner Bros. Television Distribution during its original run despite owning Marvel's rival, DC Comics and is currently distributed by Disney Platform Distribution in the United States.

X-Men: Evolution ran for a total of four seasons, comprising 52 episodes in total, from November 4, 2000, to October 25, 2003, on Kids' WB, making it the third longest-running Marvel Comics animated series at the time, behind Fox Kids' X-Men: The Animated Series and Spider-Man: The Animated Series. Seasons one through three aired on Cartoon Network from August 31, 2001, to May 27, 2003. The series later aired on Disney XD from June 15, 2009, to December 30, 2011 and was later featured on Disney+.

== Plot ==
=== Season 1 ===
The first season introduces the core characters of the series. The titular team, founded by Professor Charles Xavier, competes with Mystique to recruit young mutants with newly discovered superpowers to their cause. At the Xavier's School for Gifted Youngsters, the teenage X-Men are taught by Xavier, Wolverine, and Storm to control their abilities and keep them hidden from the rest of society whilst attending high school in the fictional Upstate New York town of Bayville. Their ranks grow over the course of the season and ultimately include Cyclops, Jean Grey, Nightcrawler, Shadowcat, Spyke, and Rogue, who is initially manipulated into joining Mystique's Brotherhood of Bayville.

While the X-Men teach their recruits to exercise restraint and uphold responsibility, Mystique encourages the Brotherhood to recklessly use their powers for selfish gain. The juvenile delinquents inducted into the Brotherhood consist of Avalanche, Toad, Blob, and Quicksilver. The mastermind behind Mystique and the Brotherhood is eventually revealed to be Magneto, a shadowy and mysterious figure from Xavier's past who seeks to enable mutants to replace humans as the dominant species on the planet. Nightcrawler also learns that he is Mystique's biological son, who was lost to her long ago due to Magneto's interference.

Other villains in the season are Wolverine's old rival Sabretooth, Xavier's vengeful half-brother Juggernaut, and Weapon X professor Andre Thorton.

=== Season 2 ===
Season two focuses on the continuing conflict between the X-Men, Magneto, and Mystique. Beast joins the X-Men as a teacher after his transformation while a cohort of new mutants are added to their ranks, including Iceman, Magma, Jubilee, Cannonball, Berzerker, Multiple, Sunspot, Wolfsbane, and Boom Boom, who soon leaves the team and becomes a neutral character. The season also introduces Angel, who uses his powers to help people independently but chooses not to join the X-Men.

Cyclops and Jean grow closer, creating a love triangle when Rogue develops a crush on Cyclops, while Shadowcat and Avalanche begin dating despite being on opposing sides.

After being enlisted by S.H.I.E.L.D. director Nick Fury in one episode, Wolverine had a memory of him working in World War II alongside Captain America and liberating a concentration camp that a younger Magneto was held in. Due to suffering the side effects of Project Rebirth, which was later revealed to only work on mutants, Captain America was frozen in ice until a cure can be found.

The X-Men are faced with several threats: Mystique strikes off with the Brotherhood and recruits the Scarlet Witch, Magneto's abandoned daughter and Quicksilver's sister, to seek revenge; Mesmero plots to free the ancient mutant Apocalypse; and Magneto forms a new group of mutant followers called the Acolytes, comprising Sabretooth, Gambit, Pyro, and Colossus. The existence of mutants is ultimately revealed to the world when Magneto pits the X-Men and the Brotherhood against Bolivar Trask's anti-mutant weapon, the Sentinel. The X-Men discover that Mystique has been posing as Xavier, who is now missing.

=== Season 3 ===
Season three focuses on the rising tension and hostility between mutants and humans. After Xavier is found and rescued, the X-Men attempt to rebuild their normal lives in Bayville and continue using their powers for good, though they face public scrutiny and discrimination from the other students at school. In addition, Trask is arrested.

The X-Men are forced to contend with numerous personal struggles: Cyclops is abducted and left for dead by Mystique; Spyke leaves the team to join the sewer-dwelling Morlocks after he unwittingly drinks an energy drink that is toxic to mutants and causes his mutation to rapidly advance; Nightcrawler overcomes his insecurities about his appearance; Rogue learns that Mystique is her adoptive mother and loses control of her powers; and Wolverine discovers that he has a teenage clone called X-23 who was created by Hydra to be trained and used as a weapon.

Meanwhile, Magneto enlists Mastermind to alter Scarlet Witch's memories to end her vendetta against him; and Mesmero manipulates Mystique and hypnotizes Rogue into helping him resurrect Apocalypse, who defeats the combined forces of the X-Men, the Brotherhood, and the Acolytes.

=== Season 4 ===
Season four focuses on the aftermath of the X-Men's failed attempt to prevent Apocalypse's revival. The Brotherhood try their hand at heroism, only for their selfish tendencies to prevail; Wolverine and X-23 work together to bring down Hydra; Xavier confronts his estranged son David; Spyke and the Morlocks begin fighting back against human prejudice; Shadowcat befriends Danielle Moonstar; and Rogue pushes Mystique's petrified statue off a cliff, creating a rift between her and Nightcrawler, which causes her to seek redemption by helping Gambit to rescue his father.

Apocalypse captures and transforms Xavier, Storm, Magneto, and Mystique into his Four Horsemen as he attempts to turn the human population into mutants. Because of the threat of Apocalypse, Nick Fury was given orders to release Trask from prison in order to have the Sentinels fight Apocalypse.

During the final battle, the X-Men and their allies defeat the Horsemen, who are returned to normal, while Rogue absorbs the powers of Dorian Leach to neutralize Apocalypse. In the aftermath, Rogue and Nightcrawler rebuff Mystique's attempt to make amends; Magneto reconciles with Quicksilver and Scarlet Witch; Shadowcat and Avalanche rekindle their relationship; Spyke reconnects with his aunt Storm; and Xavier sees his students reunited as the X-Men.

The series ends with a speech by Xavier, having caught a glimpse of the near future in Apocalypse's mind that shows:

- Continued anti-mutant sentiment at Capitol Hill.
- A reformed Magneto as a new instructor at Xavier's institute.
- Jean being consumed by the all-powerful Phoenix Force. Had the series continued, the fifth season would have focused on the Dark Phoenix saga with her becoming an enemy of the X-Men.
- The future X-Men team consisting of Cyclops, Nightcrawler, Shadowcat, Storm, Beast, Iceman, Colossus, X-23, and Rogue, who is now capable of flight and no longer wearing gloves.
- The Brotherhood, including Pyro reforming and joining S.H.I.E.L.D.
- A fleet of Sentinels led by Nimrod.
- A final photographic portrait of the full X-Men roster, including new members Havok, Angel, Gambit, Colossus, and X-23.

== Episodes ==
Season	Episodes	Originally released	
Season	Episodes	First released	Last released
1	13	November 4, 2000	May 12, 2001
2	17	September 29, 2001	May 11, 2002
3	8	September 14, 2002	November 30, 2002
4	13	August 2, 2003	October 25, 2003

== Cast and characters ==
The full X-Men roster seen in the series finale

- Professor Charles Xavier (voiced by David Kaye) is the telepathic founder and pacifistic leader of the X-Men. Nicknamed "Professor X" by his students, he remains somewhat secretive to protect the young mutants in his care. Although he often emphasizes the importance of keeping their powers hidden from the rest of the world, Xavier remains hopeful that mutants and humans can one day coexist peacefully.
- Scott Summers / Cyclops (voiced by Kirby Morrow) is the disciplined and responsible field leader of the X-Men. His eyes constantly emit powerful energy beams known as "optic blasts", which can only be controlled by his ruby-quartz glasses and visor. Scott harbors romantic affections for his best friend Jean, but only confesses his feelings for her in the third season, after which they begin dating.
- Jean Grey (voiced by Venus Terzo) is a popular girl with powerful telepathic and telekinetic abilities. She finds herself romantically torn between Duncan Matthews and Scott, until she and Scott begin dating in the third season.
- Evan Daniels / Spyke (voiced by Neil Denis) is Ororo's playful and stubborn nephew and the youngest member of the X-Men. He has the ability to project bone-like protrusions from his skin. In the third season, Evan leaves the X-Men to join the Morlocks after losing control of his powers.
- Logan / Wolverine (voiced by Scott McNeil) is the "gruff uncle" of the X-Men and the strict instructor in charge of the young mutants' combat and survival training. He possesses heightened senses, a regenerative healing factor and an indestructible adamantium skeleton with retractable hand claws. Logan has also shown a softer side as a protective surrogate father to both his clone X-23 and Rogue after she loses control of her powers.
- Ororo Munroe / Storm (voiced by Kirsten Williamson) is Evan's aunt and a wise mentor to the X-Men who can harness the forces of nature and manipulate the weather. She was previously worshipped due to her ability to summon the rains.
- Rogue (voiced by Meghan Black) is a sullen and reclusive goth girl who can absorb the life force, attributes, memories, and powers of anyone through physical touch. She is Mystique's adopted daughter and Kurt's foster sister. Rogue is initially tricked into joining the Brotherhood of Mutants before defecting to the X-Men. She develops an unrequited crush on Scott but eventually becomes attracted to Gambit, an Acolyte working for Magneto.
- Kitty Pryde / Shadowcat (voiced by Maggie Blue O'Hara) is an upbeat and cheerful valley girl who can become intangible. She is the second youngest member of the X-Men and develops a close friendship with Kurt over the course of the series. Despite being on opposing teams, Kitty begins dating Avalanche of the Brotherhood of Mutants in the second season.
- Kurt Wagner / Nightcrawler (voiced by Brad Swaile) is the blue-furred prankster of the X-Men with the ability to teleport. He is Mystique's biological son and Rogue's foster brother. Kurt develops a close friendship with Kitty and his penchant for excessive goofiness initially clashes with Scott's rule-abiding leadership. He is insecure about his appearance and given a holographic image inducer that allows him to blend in at school, though he comes to embrace his true self over the course of the series.
- Hank McCoy / Beast (voiced by Michael Kopsa) is a mild-mannered intellectual with a repressed, feral alternative mutant personality. He initially works as a gym coach and chemistry teacher at Bayville High School before his latent transformation forces him to retire and join the X-Men as a mentor in the second season.

== Music ==
X-Men: Evolution featured several songs that were produced exclusively for the show:

- "Only a Girl (The Bayville Sirens' Theme)" in "Walk on the Wild Side".
- "T-O-A-D (Toad's Theme)" in "The Toad, the Witch and the Wardrobe".
- "Who Am I Now? (Rogue's Theme)" in "Rogue Recruit".
- "Wolverine (Wolverine's Theme)" in a promotional video.
- "Evolution Theme (Theme Song)" in the start of the show.

The theme and score for X-Men: Evolution was composed and produced by William Kevin Anderson. Several characters had distinct musical cues, including Avalanche (heavy guitar riffs), Storm (orchestra piece), and Apocalypse (Egyptian music). Others had special sound effects. These include Jean Grey (light chime noise), Sabretooth (roaring), Rogue (also has a unique, black and white special effect), Magneto, Gambit, Shadowcat, and Nightcrawler. The main theme song was recorded by Anderson.

== Production ==
The original working title of the show while in production was Children of the Atom, a reference to the X-Men comic book in circulation. However, this was scrapped as the network did not want the title to reference children. One of the main points of the new X-Men: Evolution concept was the design of the new costumes. Early concept art sketches show the X-Men in classic gold-and-black garb. In these drafts, Spyke wears cornrows, Rogue's outfit exposes her midriff, and Jean Grey's costume is the female version of Cyclops' costume. Both Jean Grey and Shadowcat wear face masks, and Kitty is also wearing an orange miniskirt and Doc Martens over spandex. Early Storm drawings show her wearing white rather than black.

A point of controversy was the design of the blue-skinned villain Mystique. Steven E. Gordon, the character designer and director of various episodes, was never impressed with the Mystique designs for the first season. Mystique was originally to be presented as nude, akin to her film counterpart, but Warner Bros. did not want this included in a Kids' WB! production. However, a short scene of Mystique drawn to resemble her film counterpart (albeit clothed) appears in the Season 1 finale. Gordon stopped directing after two seasons, but continued to design characters for the show. He is most satisfied with the designs of Rogue and Scarlet Witch.

The show also contained various pop culture references: in episode 9 of the first season, one of Wolverine's defensive programs for the Danger Room is referred to as "Logan's Run X13", a reference to the novel/film Logan's Run. The Rogue/Kitty dance in "Spykecam" was modeled after a similar dance in the Buffy the Vampire Slayer episode "Bad Girls". The play used in "Spykecam", Dracula: The Musical, is a real play. The song used, however, is an original song made for the episode. The writers of the show have also admitted that they were fans of Buffy the Vampire Slayer. Using Shadowcat as the catalyst, the two shows appear similar: a teenage girl with superpowers fights powerful villains in order to save her high school. Buffy creator Joss Whedon has openly credited Kitty Pryde as an inspiration for the character of Buffy Summers.

Starting with the first episode of Season 4, "Impact", the episode title was no longer aired on-screen at the beginning of the show, and X-Men: Evolution became the third longest-running Marvel cartoon, behind Spider-Man: The Animated Series (5 seasons, 65 episodes) and X-Men: The Animated Series (5 seasons, 76 episodes). Boyd Kirkland, the show's producer, says his favorite X-Men: Evolution season is Season 3. The monthly budget for X-Men: Evolution was $350,000.

This is the first X-Men animated series to use digital ink and paint.

Produced in the United States, the voice recording was done in Canada and the show was animated in Japan and South Korea. Most of the animation was outsourced to Madhouse, Mook Animation in Japan, DR Movie, and WHITE LINE in South Korea.

While no official statement has come down on why the show ended after season 4, the show's co-producer, Robert N. Skir, has stated that it most likely came down to WB wanting show changes as well as business strategy moves with Nickelodeon in 2003.

== Successors ==
The show gave birth to a new series, Wolverine and the X-Men, which premiered on January 23, 2009 to great reviews and ratings and lasted for only one season but was cancelled on November 29, 2009 after 26 episodes due to financial difficulties with animation production despite plans for a second season. Although the series was not a continuation of X-Men: Evolution, the same creative team was behind the show: Craig Kyle, Chris Yost, Steven E. Gordon, Greg Johnson and Boyd Kirkland all returned to work on the series.

In 2012, Jean Grey and Robert Kelly made guest appearances in the Iron Man: Armored Adventures episode "The X-Factor", with Venus Terzo and Dale Wilson reprising their roles from X-Men: Evolution.

== Reception ==
According to IGN, the show aired "much to X-fans' initial protests and lamentations." RPGnet enjoyed Evolution's second season, hailing it as the show's "transition season." An improvement over the show's first season "in every way," X-Men: Evolution, according to RPGnet, "introduc[ed] many ... re-imagined characters from X-Men lore that will certainly entertain the X-Men fans," specifically Beast and Principal Kelley. RPGnet wrote, "Some episodes could easily be cut out of the show and they would not be missed," describing the dialogue as "atrocious at times" and some of the characters as "very one dimensional." Positively, Fred Choi of The Tech hailed X-Men: Evolution as "the best incarnation of X-Men yet," admitting that "There are a few changes which will send purists howling in the streets." Choi acknowledged that "The students generally have abilities more powerful than they ever had in the comics," specifically mentioning intangible Shadowcat and telekinetic Jean Grey. While praising the show's animation and music – "cleaner than the original series" – Choi described the transformation of Rogue "into a reclusive goth chick" as " completely baffling but surprisingly palatable."

Noting the show's treatment of its characters, specifically making them high school teenagers for thematic purposes as "admirable," John G. Nettles of PopMatters concluded, "What disappoints, however, is the sheer number of missed opportunities here and the decision to subscribe to the same old social norms." Reviewing X-Men: Evolution's third season, Filip Vukcevic of IGN was mixed in his analysis, deeming it inferior to X-Men: The Animated Series and concluding, "Evolution ... will interest long-time X-fans, but the fluffy stories and underutilized character personalities ... will cause discerning viewers to zone out," suffering from its attempt "to cram everyone in." Additionally, the author felt that Evolution lacks the "visual flair" of The Batman and the "wit" of Teen Titans. The author also panned the series' "average" voice acting, feeling that Magneto, Wolverine and Beast were "miscast." He also noted that combined with "inventive gags," "the show does its best to make the most of the mutants' powers" because "The fight scenes are fun to watch if only to see how the characters interact."

== Awards and nominations ==
X-Men: Evolution won the award for Outstanding Sound Mixing – Special Class at the 28th Daytime Emmy Awards, on May 18, 2001 and won the award for Outstanding Sound Editing – Live Action and Animation at the 30th Daytime Emmy Awards, on May 16, 2003.

It also won the Cover of the Year Award in 2004 for best animated figure for Beast. It was nominated for several Golden Reel Awards, as well as other Emmys. Steven E. Gordon, the director of this show, was nominated in the Production Design in an Animated Television Production category for X-Men: Evolution at the 2001 Annie Awards.

== Analysis ==
=== Comparison with original comics ===
The X-Men: Evolution series was targeted at a younger audience and as such portrays the majority of characters as adolescents rather than adults like in X-Men: The Animated Series. In the series, like many animated series based on comics, completely new characters were introduced including Spyke. As much of the cast are teenagers, they attend regular high school in addition to the Xavier's Institute.

X-Men: Evolution is set in a fictionalized version of the real life Long Island village of Bayville, New York instead of Westchester County in the comics. In the first two seasons, the X-Men do not face prejudice, as mutants are not publicly known to exist. In addition, the Brotherhood of Mutants is depicted as a group misfit mutants and juvenile delinquents rather than the terrorist group of the comics. At the end of the second season, mutants are exposed to the world, resulting in the X-Men facing larger threats and opposition from persecution from the United States government.

The series was created as a stark contrast to X-Men: The Animated Series. The series' bible was written by Robert N. Skir and Marty Isenberg (albeit uncredited), who meant to take the X-Men back to their roots as high school students learning to control their superpowers, as when the comics termed them "The Strangest Teens of All". Whereas the Fox series reflected the then-current role of X-Men as freedom fighters battling persecution and bigotry against mutantkind, X-Men: Evolution used the theme of mutant powers as a metaphor for the struggles of adolescence.

The look of the series was designed by producer Boyd Kirkland and artist Frank Paur, who created new costumes for the X-Men, replacing the comics-faithful designs of X-Men: The Animated Series with anime-influenced costumes which were much more animation-friendly.

=== Evolution characters in the comics and films ===
X-23, an original character introduced in later seasons, made her comic book debut in the miniseries NYX, where her appearance was slightly altered to more closely resemble Wolverine. She received a self-titled comic miniseries in 2005. The character of Dr. Deborah Risman which created X-23, the clone of Wolverine, was also created for the show and was replaced with a similar character named Dr. Sarah Kinney in the miniseries X-23. She later made appearances in the television series Wolverine and the X-Men, and in the films Logan and Deadpool & Wolverine, portrayed by Dafne Keen.

=== Marvel references and cameos ===
X-Men: Evolution weaves many references and cameos into its show. In the Season 3 episode "Under Lock and Key", circumstances gather a mix of X-Men, junior members, and nonmembers into a mission team that matches the original five members of the X-Men in the comics (Cyclops, Jean Grey, Beast, Iceman, and Angel). In the Season 3 episode "Dark Horizon", Kitty is seen sleeping with a stuffed purple dragon, a reference to Lockheed, her purple dragon companion. In the episode "Dark Horizon", Nightcrawler, Colossus, and Shadowcat are grouped together when the X-Men and the Acolytes are separated, a reference to the Europe-based superhero team Excalibur which included all three mutants in its roster.

Captain America is the only non-mutant Marvel superhero to appear on Evolution. There is also, however, a small Iron Man reference in the episode "On Angel's Wings", when a sign reading "Stark Enterprises" is seen during an exterior shot of New York City and a small Spider-Man reference when Angel is shown reading the Daily Bugle, the newspaper that Peter Parker / Spider-Man normally takes pictures for. In addition, Omega Red mentions Maverick and Kestrel in the episode "Target X", referring to the latter as "Wraith". In "Dark Horizon", the hieroglyphics translated by Beast refer to Pharaoh Rama-Tut, one identity of Kang the Conqueror.

== Home media ==
=== iTunes ===
All four seasons are available for download in SD format on iTunes (Only available for America), being released in 2009 by Marvel. All 4 seasons immediately broke into the Top 10 Animation charts on iTunes, with season 4 peaking at #3.

=== DVD ===
Name	Release dates			Ep #	Additional information
Name	Region 1	Region 2	Region 4	Ep #	Additional information
UnXpected Changes	September 23, 2003	TBA	TBA	3	Season one, volume one
Xplosive Days	September 23, 2003	TBA	TBA	3	Season one, volume two
X Marks the Spot	September 23, 2003	TBA	TBA	3	Season one, volume three
Xposing the Truth	September 23, 2003	TBA	TBA	4	Season one, volume four
Mutants Rising	February 10, 2004	TBA	TBA	4	Season two, volume one
Powers Revealed	February 10, 2004	TBA	TBA	4	Season two, volume two
Enemies Unveiled	June 29, 2004	TBA	TBA	4	Season two, volume three
Mystique's Revenge	November 23, 2004	TBA	TBA	5	Season two, volume four
The Complete Third Season	May 23, 2006	TBA	TBA	13	
The Complete Fourth Season	TBA	TBA	TBA	9	
The Complete Animated Series	TBA	TBA	TBA	52	

=== Streaming services ===
- Disney+ - All four seasons are currently available as of May 2024 in the United States and Canada.
- Netflix - The series is not available on Netflix, though the DVDs were available as part of their now defunct DVD by mail service.
- YouTube - All four seasons were uploaded on YouTube, however Marvel Entertainment's YouTube channel listed them as private.
- Google Play - All four seasons are currently available on Google Play, although the show is inaccessible in some countries, such as Poland.
- Hulu - Hulu had all episodes available on streaming as early as 2009. However, it is no longer available.
- Amazon - All four seasons are currently available on Amazon Instant Video.
- iTunes - All four seasons are currently available for purchase on the iTunes Store.
- HBO Max - All four seasons are currently available in HD on streaming in Latin America since September 17, 2022.

== Merchandise ==
=== Comic books ===
In January 2002, Marvel Comics began publishing an X-Men: Evolution comic book, partially based on the show. Written by Devin K. Grayson with art by Studio XD, it was abruptly canceled after the ninth issue due to low sales. The series has been reprinted in two trade paperbacks.

The comic introduced the Evolution version of the Morlocks before they appeared on the show, and their appearances and motivations were radically different in both versions. It also featured an appearance from Mimic, who never appeared on the series.

An ongoing plot line would have introduced the Evolution version of Mister Sinister, but the comic was canceled before it could be resolved. However, the cover of the unreleased issue 10 does reveal his intended character design.

A crossover comic between Evolution and X-Men '92, titled X-Men '92: Incursions #1, will be released on January 6, 2027, written by Craig Kyle and Christopher Yost.

=== Action figurines ===
Toy Biz created a line of action figures. Taco Bell ran the first X-Men: Evolution themed promotion with its Kid's Meals. Burger King also ran a Kid's Meal promotion which included X-Men: Evolution toys. Each toy included a mini-disc with games, screen-savers, and a mini-comic related to the character. The lineup included Rogue, Mystique, Cyclops, Wolverine, Magneto, Quicksilver, Nightcrawler, and Toad.
