= Frank Paur =

American animator and director

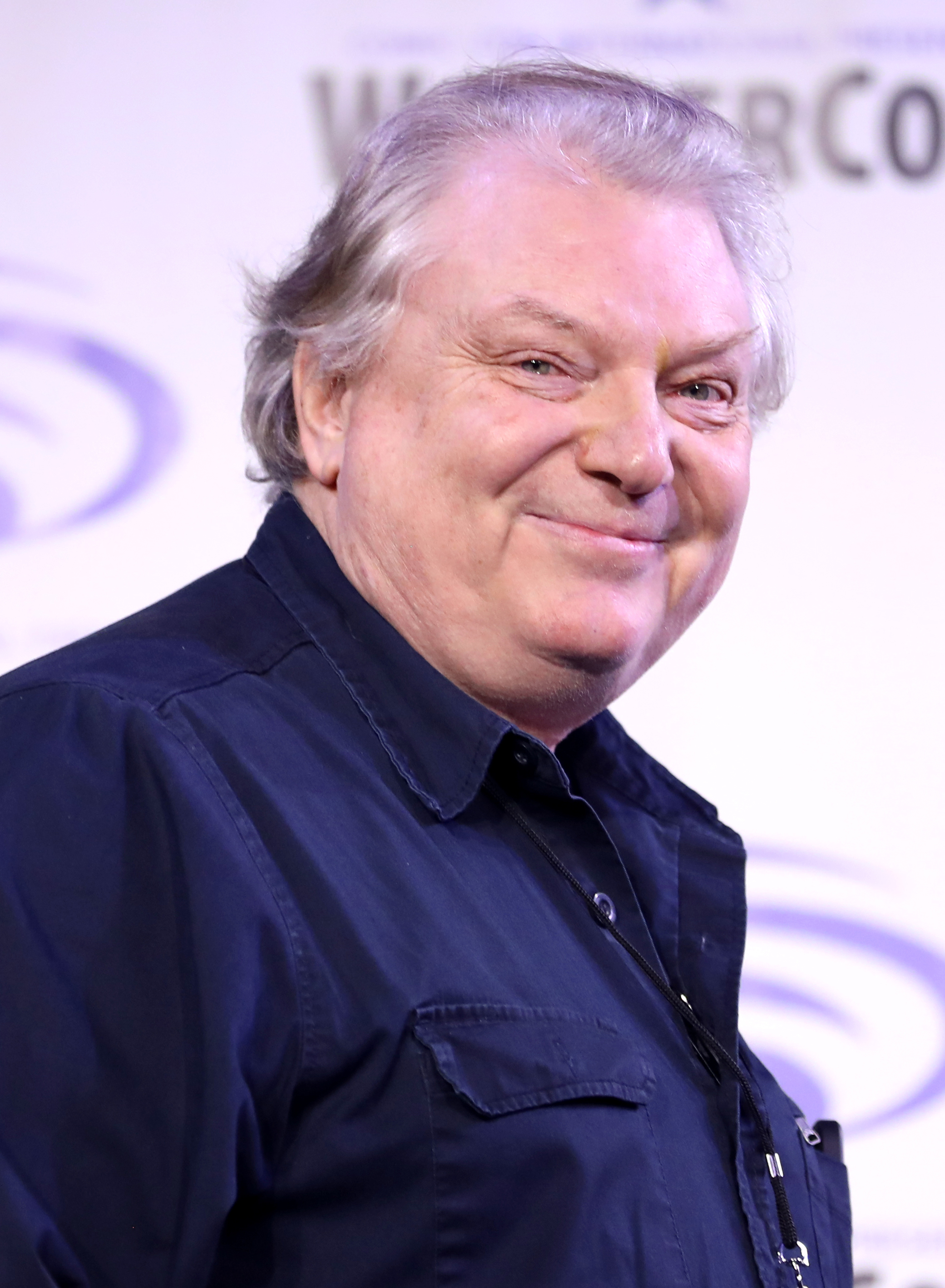
Paur at the 2024 WonderCon

Frank Paur is an American television director of animated cartoons and storyboard artist. He is best known for his work on Batman: The Animated Series, the Disney animated series Gargoyles, X-Men: Evolution, and The Avengers: Earth's Mightiest Heroes.

== Marvel Animation ==
Paur is currently working with Lionsgate Studios and Marvel Animation on their line of animated films. He has directed The Invincible Iron Man, Doctor Strange and both Hulk Vs segments (Hulk vs Wolverine and Hulk vs Thor).
