= Boyd Kirkland =

American television director (1950–2011)

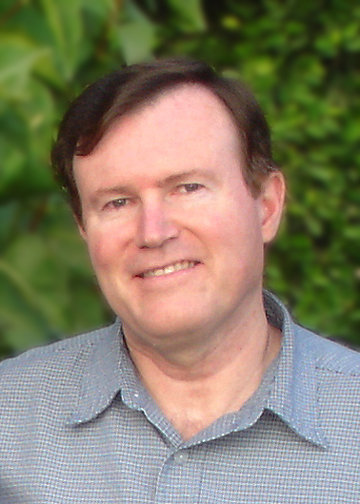
- Born: Boyd Douglas Kirkland; November 4, 1950; Salt Lake City, Utah, U.S.
- Died: January 27, 2011 (aged 60); Los Angeles, California, U.S.
- Occupations: Film director, producer, animator
- Spouse: Barbara Guest (m. 1972)
- Children: 5

Boyd Douglas Kirkland (November 4, 1950 – January 27, 2011) was an American television director of animated cartoons. He was best known for his work on X-Men: Evolution and Batman: The Animated Series.

== Biography ==
Kirkland was raised in Utah as a member of the Church of Jesus Christ of Latter-day Saints (LDS Church). He received his bachelor's degree in Business Administration from Weber State College in Ogden, Utah. His career in animation started in 1979 as a layout artist. This evolved into XAM! Productions, a partnership based in Salt Lake City that subcontracted for larger Los Angeles-based studios. He moved his family to Los Angeles in 1986.

Kirkland published articles about the nature of God in Mormon thought. While a missionary for the LDS Church, Kirkland was confused about the Adam–God doctrine, ostensibly taught in the 19th century and denied in the 1970s, which led him to start questioning the current official church leaders. After brief requests for answers from church leaders, Kirkland researched the controversy, resulting in articles published in Sunstone Magazine, Dialogue: A Journal of Mormon Thought, and chapters of Line Upon Line: Essays on Mormon Doctrine.

Kirkland was a producer for Attack of the Killer Tomatoes, and as a storyboard artist for G.I. Joe: The Movie, Little Nemo: Adventures in Slumberland, My Little Pony: The Movie, and Starchaser: The Legend of Orin. Additionally, he was a director and writer for Batman: The Animated Series and The Avengers: Earth's Mightiest Heroes. "Michael Korvac", an episode of the latter series, was dedicated to him.

Kirkland had idiopathic pulmonary fibrosis (IPF) and interstitial lung disease (ILD). He died on January 27, 2011, at Ronald Reagan UCLA Medical Center, while awaiting a lung transplant.
