= Joel Heller =

American radio and television producer

- Born: Joel Harrison Heller; July 5, 1931; Brooklyn, New York, U.S.
- Died: October 25, 2024 (aged 93); Manassas, Virginia
- Education: Syracuse University (bachelor's and master's degrees)
- Occupations: Radio and television producer
- Employer: CBS News
- Known for: In the Know, In the News, What's It All About?, The American Parade, Razzmatazz, 30 Minutes
- Spouses: Simma Harris (married 1962–div. ?); Victoria Hawley Bogle (married 1965–div. ?)
- Children: 1
- Parents: Ralph Jay Heller; Mildred Heller

Joel Harrison Heller (July 5, 1931 – October 25, 2024) was an American radio and television producer for CBS News in New York, who worked with Walter Cronkite, Christopher Glenn, Charles Kuralt, Mike Wallace, and other prominent journalists of his era. As executive producer and later director of children's programs for CBS News in the 1970s and 1980s, he developed numerous innovative, critically acclaimed, and award-winning informational programs for children, including In the Know, In the News, What's It All About?, Razzmatazz, and 30 Minutes. During a period when children's educational and informational programming on the major television networks was expanding, he became one of the foremost authorities in the field.

== Early life and education ==
Heller was born in Brooklyn, New York. His father was Ralph Jay Heller, an insurance salesman; his mother was Mildred Heller, a homemaker; and his younger sister was Carol. He grew up mainly in Long Beach, New York. As a student, he developed an interest in broadcast journalism. He graduated from Long Beach High School in 1949, where he was a member of the Speech Arts Club, which was organized for students interested in radio announcing, editing, and public speaking, and The Tide, the student newspaper. His graduating class voted him the man "Most Likely to Succeed."

Heller entered Syracuse University in 1949, which then had one of the only radio and television curriculums in the United States. He became a member of two scholastic honorary societies: Alpha Kappa Delta, for sociology, and Alpha Epsilon Rho, for radio (now electronic media). He graduated with a bachelor's degree in sociology and radio from the university's College of Liberal Arts in 1953. He received a master's degree in the television sequence from its Television, Radio and Film Master's program in 1954. Established in 1950, this program was the first of its kind.

While at Syracuse, Heller gained experience in both radio and television broadcasting. As a freshman, he began working for WAER, one of the first college radio stations in the United States, which was launched in 1947. He was involved in production, continuity, and engineering work and then became production director. In his senior year, he led the station as program director, managing a staff of over 70. He also worked as a radio engineer for WFBL, a Syracuse radio station that was a charter member of the CBS Radio Network. As a graduate student, he helped prepare an eight-minute segment on the university's extracurricular activities for the television program University Reporter, which aired on WSYR-TV in March 1954—likely the first television segment to which he contributed.

After Heller received his master's degree, he served with the U.S. Army Psychological Warfare Branch in South Korea from 1954 to 1956, which transmitted information, news, and propaganda to enemy forces and civilian populations by radio and other media. During this time, he prepared radio broadcasts beamed at North Korea and the People's Republic of China.

== Career ==
=== 1950s–1960s: Radio, Television, and Albums at CBS News ===
By 1957 Heller was working for CBS News, originally for radio and later for television as well. Initially a clerk in the radio division's press information office, he was promoted to researcher for the program Answer, Please, hosted by CBS News correspondent Douglas Edwards, in early 1958. He later became a producer for multiple programs, including the long-running Church of the Air. In 1960 he was named manager of CBS News's public affairs department in the radio division.

In November 1960, CBS Radio overhauled its daytime schedule, replacing entertainment with informational programming. This shift gave Heller the opportunity to create an ambitious series titled Dimension, for which he was executive producer. This series consisted of daily five-minute features on diverse subjects, presented by CBS News correspondents. In 1964, Billboard noted that Heller's staff produced 20 segments a week, which constituted a virtual encyclopedia of news topics, ranging from the space race to how the holes get in Swiss cheese.

While producing Dimension, Heller became producer of his first children's television program, The Reading Room. It was developed by CBS's public affairs department in collaboration with the American Library Association, the Child Study Association of America, and the National Education Association and premiered on September 22, 1962. On each episode the host, English teacher Ned Hoopes, explored a single book, such as Earl Miers's Mark Twain on the Mississippi, to encourage children to read. The following season Heller served as producer of another children's program, Do You Know?, which premiered on CBS on October 12, 1963. Hosted by Bob Maxwell, it featured two teams of kids answering questions based on different books.

In 1965, Heller was appointed executive producer of news programming for CBS Radio, where he was responsible for Mike Wallace at Large, World of Religion, Personal Close-up, Ask Betty Furness, and other programs. He also produced The Incredible Year, an album in which CBS News correspondent Charles Kuralt recounts the major events of 1968, which sold over 250,000 copies, and Kennedy-Nixon: The Great Debates, 1960, which was nominated for a Grammy Award for Best Spoken Word Recording.

Then in 1969 Heller became executive producer of CBS News's newly created resources development and production department. In this position, he oversaw the creation of products related to CBS News broadcasts, including publications, educational materials, and record albums. For example, he produced two more albums, Man on the Moon (1969), in which CBS Evening News anchor Walter Cronkite looked back at the historic Apollo 11 moon landing, and 1969: A Record of the Year (1970), narrated by Kuralt. Man on the Moon sold over 1.3 million copies and was nominated for a Grammy Award for Best Spoken Word Recording.

=== 1970s–1990s: Children's Television and Documentaries at CBS News ===
At the same time, in response to pressure from advocacy groups like Action for Children's Television (ACT) and the threat of new regulations from the Federal Communications Commission (FCC), ABC, CBS, and NBC began expanding their educational and informational programming for children. Fred Silverman, then CBS's director of daytime programming, recruited Heller to help develop In the Know, the first of a series of critically acclaimed, award-winning informational television programs for children Heller produced in the 1970s and 1980s. He collaborated with Hanna-Barbera Productions to develop the two-and-one-half-minute informational segments aimed at kids 6 to 12, which premiered in September 1970 and aired between Saturday morning cartoons. In these segments, characters from the animated series Josie and the Pussycats presented short live-action films on subjects like volcanoes, watchmaking, lunar rovers, iron-ore mining, and the construction of the Eiffel Tower. Viewing these segments as mini-documentaries, Heller explained that he intended to "present one idea quickly in simple visual terms—like showing what makes an airplane stay up in the air—and then get off quickly, before the child realizes he's being educated. The child will have learned a fact that will expand his perception of the world. And, if our concept is right, he won't turn us off as he undoubtedly would if we gave him a half-hour documentary on the same subject."

Encouraged by In the Know's success, Heller next developed In the News. These two-and-one-half minute segments on current events were presented by CBS News correspondent Christopher Glenn and aired for 16 seasons from 1971 to 1987 during the Saturday morning children's programming block between cartoons, where they were seen by generations of children. In a 1982 Gallup survey of 1,010 teenagers, nearly 90 percent stated that these segments had informed them about the world when they were younger and nearly half declared that they were a major source of information about current events. As Heller observed, by presenting the news to kids in short segments during programs they were already watching, "we have an opportunity to reach kids who wouldn't otherwise watch the news."

In November 1971, Heller was appointed executive producer of children's broadcasts at CBS News. In this newly created post, he developed and supervised numerous educational and informational programs for children and their parents. For example, The American Parade is a series of 13 prime-time specials aired from 1974 to 1976 that celebrate the Bicentennial. Targeted to families, each special focuses on a major historical theme and incorporates music, dance, animation, and dramatic reenactments. Mary Tyler Moore, then starring in her hit CBS sitcom, hosted the first one, "We, the Women." What's It All About? is a series of half-hour specials presented by CBS News correspondents, including Sylvia Chase, Walter Cronkite, Christopher Glenn, Roger Mudd, and Daniel Schorr, that aired from 1972 to 1980. Each one explains to kids a topical subject, such as the 1974 election, inflation, the Middle East, the Apollo-Soyuz mission, and the 1976 political conventions.

Concluding that spending a half-hour on one subject taxed a child's attention span, Heller then created Razzmatazz in collaboration with Scholastic Magazines. Hosted by Barry Bostwick and later Brian Tochi, this 30-minute newsmagazine (the pilot was one hour) aired from 1977 to 1982. Each episode is divided into short segments that show young people pursuing a range of interests, from competing in rodeos to serving as volunteer firefighters. Heller told a journalist that the program's focus was on "the infinite ways in which young people are enthusiastically enjoying and participating in life—life in the 'real world.'" He emphasized that the stress "is on the positive, on the real pleasure that these young people are getting from their success, no matter what the endeavor."

While Razzmatazz was still on the air, Heller created 30 Minutes, a groundbreaking television newsmagazine for high-school students hosted by Glenn and Betsy Aaron (replaced by Betty Ann Bowser in the third season), which aired for four seasons from 1978 to 1982. Modeled on 60 Minutes, this program featured short segments on stories of interest to high-school students and is best known for addressing sensitive social issues, such as suicide, child abuse, anorexia nervosa, and sexually transmitted disease; the effects of parental alcoholism or divorce on kids; and teenage marriage, homosexuality, and runaways. Both programs were highly praised by television critics.

In 1979 Heller was promoted to director, children's programs at CBS. In addition to continuing to develop new children's informational programs, he became the liaison with the children's programming department of the network's entertainment division. After the cancellation of Razzmatazz and 30 Minutes, he also began producing documentaries for the network's documentary unit, such as The Legacy of Harry S. Truman, which aired on July 18, 1984 and was presented by Cronkite. In 1985 and 1986 he served as executive producer in charge of documentary broadcasts anchored by Cronkite, who had been named CBS News special correspondent after retiring from the CBS Evening News in 1981.

In the late 1980s Heller also was executive producer of three series of one-minute segments for CBS News. American Treasury, for young viewers, which began airing on weekday afternoons in September 1985, features celebrities presenting interesting facts on a broad range of subjects, drawn from items in the Library of Congress, with the goal of encouraging kids to use libraries. In We the People, broadcast in prime-time in 1986 and 1987, public personalities illuminate aspects of constitutional history to celebrate the two-hundredth anniversary of the U.S. Constitution. A Presidential Portrait, which aired in prime-time from 1987 to 1989, features CBS News correspondents presenting vignettes from the lives of U.S. presidents to commemorate the two-hundredth anniversary of the establishment of the presidency.

In March 1987, CBS News laid off about 200 employees. Its children's programming department was essentially dissolved as a result. The long-running In the News was cancelled, and the entire staff was let go. Heller, however, continued to produce documentaries for CBS News. For example, reflecting his long-standing interest in issue relevant to children, he was executive producer of America's Toughest Assignment: Solving the Education Crisis. In this program, which aired on CBS on September 6, 1990 as part of a week's special coverage of education, Kuralt presented segments by CBS News correspondents on efforts by education professionals across the United States to find solutions to the problems undermining the nation's schools. The following year, CBS aired daily at 3:58 p.m. School's In, a series of one-minute segments, in which Kuralt reported on similar stories. Heller's last-known credit is producer for CBS News Productions for The Trial of O. J. Simpson: An Insider's View with Dominick Dunne, which premiered on The Learning Channel on July 14, 1996.

== Awards ==
Heller received numerous awards for his work in radio, television, and recording. 30 Minutes, In the News, Razzmatazz, and What's It All About? were nominated for and won multiple Emmy Awards. 30 Minutes and In the News also won Peabody Awards. The LP albums Kennedy-Nixon: The Great Debates, 1960 and Man on Moon were nominated for Grammy Awards for Best Spoken Word Recording.

== Personal life ==
Heller married Simma Harris in 1962. Their marriage ended in divorce. He subsequently married Victoria Hawley Bogle on May 9, 1965. They had a daughter, Jennifer, in 1969. Their marriage ended in divorce by 1977, when Victoria remarried. In the 2010s, Heller moved to The Gatherings, a residential community for seniors in Manassas, Virginia, where he died in 2024.

== Legacy ==
Through his long career at CBS News, Heller became a nationally recognized authority on children's television. He was invited to speak at numerous panel discussions. He was a guest professor for graduate seminars at his alma mater, Syracuse University. He led sessions at annual workshops on children's television that CBS organized for its affiliates beginning in 1978. And he contributed to books and articles on educational and informational programming for children.

Throughout his career, Heller took a pragmatic approach to children's educational and informational programming, acknowledging that limited viewer and advertiser support restricted what was possible in this genre. He recalls that when he first met Peggy Charren, president of the advocacy group Action for Children's Television (ACT), she naively asked him how programming decisions were made. He replied: "Television's goal is to deliver viewers to advertisers. Television is not a philanthropic institution." Furthermore, as a parent himself, he believed that the amount of television children watched should be limited. "They should be out playing, exercising their bodies, reading and doing other constructive things instead of sitting passively in front of their television sets," he told a journalist in 1978. "But as long as they do watch, I'll provide the best informational programming I have the budget for."

For Heller, the best informational programs for children were ones that did not pretend to be entertainment. He believed that information should be relevant to children's lives and presented in an honest manner that avoids gimmicks. He also worked to make his programs accessible to young audiences with limited attention spans; for this reason, he was particularly known for producing short segments of one to 10 minutes—a skill he had perfected during his many years in radio. In all of his programs, his overarching objective was to help young viewers learn how to distinguish the real from the imaginary and to better understand the world they live in. As he wrote in a book on television and teenagers, the introduction of young viewers "to the real world through the light and shadow images of television needs to be carefully sorted out and explained. Otherwise the potential of this powerful language can be forever lost in the confusion of those who can see but who do not understand." He implemented these principles in programs like In the News, Razzamatazz, and 30 Minutes, which millions of children watched in the 1970s and 1980s and which set the standard for later programs.
