= What's It All About? (American TV series) =

- What's the Energy Crisis All About?, CBS, broadcast on December 8, 1973, CBS News
- Genre: News magazine
- Written by: Joel Heller; Walter Lister; Ellen Schecter; Joel Siegel
- Directed by: Arthur Bloom; Vern Diamond; Richard Knox; Alvin Thaler
- Presented by: Sylvia Chase; Walter Cronkite; Christopher Glenn; Fred Graham; Roger Mudd; Dan Rather; Daniel Schorr
- Country of origin: United States
- Original language: English
- No. of episodes: 26

Production
- Executive producer: Joel Heller
- Producers: Vern Diamond; Joel Heller; Walter Lister; Irina Posner
- Production locations: New York City, New York, United States
- Camera setup: Single-camera
- Running time: 30 minutes
- Production company: CBS News Production

Original release
- Network: CBS
- Release: July 8, 1972 – November 1, 1980

Related
- In the News, 30 Minutes, 60 Minutes

What's It All About? is a series of 26 30-minute news specials for kids produced by CBS News that aired on CBS on Saturday afternoons from July 8, 1972 to November 1, 1980. Hosted and reported by major CBS News correspondents, each special examined one timely issue, subject, or institution in the news, such as the 1972 U.S. political conventions, the 1973 launch of the Skylab space station, or the U.S. presidency. The executive producer was Joel Heller; the directors included Arthur Bloom, Vern Diamond, Richard Knox, and Alvin Thaler; and the writers included Heller, Walter Lister, and Ellen Schecter. The correspondents were Sylvia Chase, Walter Cronkite, Christopher Glenn, Fred Graham, Carol Martin, Roger Mudd, Dan Rather, Daniel Schorr, Bernard Shaw, Joel Siegel, and Lesley Stahl, among others.

What's It All About? was one of CBS's most prestigious children's informational programs of the 1970s. As Bill Leonard, CBS News Senior Vice President, Director of Public Affairs Broadcasts, remarked in 1975, "We're very proud of the acceptance this unique informational effort has received. From elections to taxes, from impeachment to the CIA, 'What's It All About?' has made more immediate and understandable the current events that surround young people; a contribution that has brought the series distinguished awards." Numerous critics at the time commented that even though the series was aimed primarily at kids, the specials were valuable for adult viewers as well.

== Production team ==
Joel Heller was the executive producer of What's It All About? He was an experienced CBS News producer who had produced numerous informational programs for children for the network since 1961. He was the producer of In the Know and executive producer of the Emmy Award–winning In the News, both of which were two-and-one-half minute informational segments that aired during the Saturday morning children's programming block between cartoons beginning in the early 1970s. While continuing to produce In the News and What's It All About?, he created Razzmatazz and 30 Minutes, award-winning television newsmagazines for kids. In 1979, he was named director, children's programs, at CBS News.

Vern Diamond directed several episodes of What's It All About? He was a veteran Emmy Award–winning producer and director who began working in television in the 1940s. In 1951 he became a staff director at WCBS-TV in New York, after having worked as senior director at WXYZ-TV in Detroit. He subsequently became a producer and director at the national network, where he directed major special events, such as the 1960 Winter Olympics, as well as repeated iterations of the Miss America Pageant, the Miss Universe Pageant, and the Tournament of Roses Parade. He also directed broadcasts of important news events, ranging from space launches to political conventions and elections. In the early 1970s, he served as producer of the revival of the children's informational program You Are There, hosted by Walter Cronkite, and he also worked on additional children's news programs produced by CBS News with Heller, with whom he collaborated regularly until the 1980s. He left CBS around 1987.

Walter Lister (1921–2009) produced and wrote several episodes of What's It All About? The son of Walter B. Lister, the former executive editor of the Evening Bulletin and Sunday Bulletin in Philadelphia, he served as a pilot in World War II. After the war, he became a journalist. He was a correspondent for the New York Herald Tribune for 17 years. Then in 1963, he joined CBS News, where he was employed for 25 years. During this time, he worked as an on-air reporter and as a producer for the CBS Evening News with Walter Cronkite and CBS News Special Reports, among other roles. In the early 1970s, he began working on children's informational programs for the network, including the revival of You Are There and In the News, for which he served as producer until its cancellation in 1987, the consequence of a mass lay-off at CBS.

== Format ==
Each special in What's It All About? was a primer on one timely issue, subject, or institution in the news, hosted by a CBS News correspondent. In contrast to a conventional newscast, the host's narration was typically complemented by reports from other CBS News correspondents, historical and contemporary news footage, animated sequences, striking images and graphics, and occasionally interactive features like quizzes—a strategy intended to hold the limited attention span of young viewers. In addition, the producers strived to show how the topics examined were relevant to the everyday lives of viewers and their families. For example, What's the Energy Crisis All About? examined the causes of the contemporary energy crisis that began in the United States in 1973. Christopher Glenn hosted the program from a model of a fully furnished house without walls built in the studio, in which he demonstrated how the electric appliances we use in everyday life require energy. An animated sequence illustrated how fossil fuels are formed. Filmed news footage accompanied Lesley Stahl's report on the causes of the crisis, while both filmed footage and inventive graphics illustrated Bernard Shaw's report on new sources of energy. Glenn concluded the program discussing conservation efforts, and during this segment he showed an excerpt of President Richard M. Nixon's November 7, 1973 announcement of Project Independence.

== Episodes ==
No. overall	Title	Original release date
1	What's a Convention All About? Part I: The Democrats	Sat., July 8, 1972, 12:30 p.m.
This special was filmed from the convention hall of the 1972 Democratic National Convention, held in Miami Beach, July 10–13, 1972. It explains what political conventions are and how they function, as well as how television covers them, and includes brief biographies of candidates Sen. George McGovern, Sen. Hubert Humphrey, and others. Host: Walter Cronkite. Correspondents: Dan Rather, Daniel Schorr, and Mike Wallace. Executive producer and writer: Joel Heller. Producer and director: Vern Diamond.
2	What's a Convention All About? Part II: The Republicans	Sat., August 19, 1972, 12:30 p.m.
This special was filmed from the convention hall of the 1972 Republican National Convention, held in Miami Beach, August 21–23, 1972.
3	What's an Election All About?	Sat., November 4, 1972, 12:30 p.m.
Broadcast shortly before the presidential election on November 7, 1972, this special describes how elections work in the United States and how television networks can project winners so quickly. Host: Walter Cronkite. Executive producer, producer, and writer: Joel Heller.
4	What's the Presidency All About?	Sat., February 24, 1973, 12:30 p.m.
Broadcast a few weeks after the second-term inauguration of President Richard M. Nixon on January 20, 1973, this special looks at the U.S. presidency, from George Washington to Nixon, focusing on what the president's powers are, where they come from, and how they are allowed to be used. It includes a tour of the Oval Office in the White House. Host: Dan Rather. Executive producer and writer: Joel Heller. Producer: Irina Posner. Director: Vern Diamond.
5	What Are Taxes All About?	Sat., April 7, 1973, 1 p.m.
Broadcast a few days before the annual April 15 income tax filing date in the United States, this special addresses the U.S. tax system, including a sequence in which Christopher Glenn explains how tax monies are used as he drives with his paycheck from the CBS building in New York to his home in Norwalk, Connecticut, cued by landmarks along the way; a feature on the history of taxation; and a short film by the Internal Revenue Service. Host: Christopher Glenn. Executive producer and writer: Joel Heller. Producer: Irina Posner. Director: Vern Diamond.
6	What's Skylab All About?	Sat., May 12, 1973, 12:30 p.m.
Taped in part at Marshall Space Flight Center in Huntsville, Alabama, this special explains how Skylab, the first space station built by NASA, will be launched on May 14, 1973, how it will operate, and how astronauts will live in it. It features a tour of a full-scale mock-up, as well as demonstrations by three high-school students (Donald Schlack of Downey, California, Kathy Jackson of Houston, Texas, and Judith Miles of Lexington, Mississippi) of scientific experiments that will be performed on the station. Host: Walter Cronkite. Executive producer: Joel Heller.
7	What's the Energy Crisis All About?	Sat., October 20, 1973, 12:30 p.m. Updated edition broadcast Sat., December 8, 1973, 12:30 p.m.
December 8 edition: Inspired by the energy crisis that began in the United States in 1973, this special emphasizes the impact of the crisis on everyday life. Glenn narrates an animated sequence showing how fossil fuels are formed and why they are becoming more scarce, Lesley Stahl reports on the causes of the crisis, including the Arab oil embargo, Bernard Shaw discusses potential new sources of energy, and Glenn concludes the program by discussing conservation efforts. Host: Christopher Glenn. Correspondents: Bernard Shaw and Lesley Stahl. Executive producer: Joel Heller. Producer and writer: Walter Lister. Director: Vern Diamond.
8	What's the Supreme Court All About?	Sat., February 2, 1974, 12:00 p.m.
This special is about the role of the U.S. Supreme Court; its relationship to the legislative and executive branches of the U.S. government; its history, including important rulings on civil rights, the rights of criminal suspects, and other issues; and how cases reach the Court for review. Host: Fred Graham. Executive producer: Joel Heller. Producer and writer: Walter Lister. Director: Vern Diamond.
9	What's Impeachment All About?	Sat., April 13, 1974, 1:00 p.m. Repeated on Sat., August 10, 1974, 12:00 p.m.
Produced in response to the anticipated impeachment hearings against President Richard M. Nixon, which took place from May 9 to July 30, 1974, this special explains the process of presidential impeachment, focusing on its constitutional basis and history, including the impeachment of President Andrew Johnson in 1868. It also examines in detail the basis of the impeachment case against Nixon, beginning with the Watergate break-in of June 1972. Host: Christopher Glenn. Correspondents: Bruce Morton and Dan Rather. Producer and writer: Walter Lister.
10	What's This Election All About?	Sat., October 26, 1974, 12:30 p.m.
On the occasion of the November 5, 1974 congressional and gubernatorial elections, this special is about how voters select candidates and some of the issues influencing this election, such as inflation, unemployment, the energy crisis, and the impeachment hearings and subsequent resignation of President Richard M. Nixon. Host: Walter Cronkite. Executive producer: Joel Heller. Producer and writer: Walter Lister. Director: Arthur Bloom.
11	What's Inflation All About?	Sat., November 30, 1974
This special is a guide to inflation, which surged to over 11 percent in 1974 because of the Arab oil embargo, the end of wage and price controls implemented by President Richard M. Nixon, and other factors. It includes an explanation of the law of supply and demand; a segment demonstrating the real-life effects of inflation on food prices, with Christopher Glenn, his wife Dianne, and their daughters Becky (12) and Lindsay (6); and recently inaugurated President Gerald R. Ford's appeal to Americans for suggestions on how to combat inflation. Host: Christopher Glenn. Executive producer: Joel Heller. Producer and writer: Walter Lister. Director: Richard Knox.
12	What's Congress All About?: Part I, The House of Representatives	Sat., July 13, 1974, 12 p.m.
Focusing on the U.S. House of Representatives, this special explains the body's powers; how bills become laws; and how the committee system works, including an interview with Rep. Peter Rodino of New Jersey, the House Judiciary Chair. It also covers the origins of Congress and features interviews with two House pages, Kim Tomb of Hawai'i and Bob Kieffer of New Jersey. Host: Roger Mudd. Executive producer: Joel Heller.
13	What's the Middle East All About?	Sat., February 22, 1975, 12:00 p.m.
This special analyzes the conflicts between Israel and the Arab states in the Middle East, focusing on their causes, their effects on the United States, and how more powerful nations are involved. Host: Christopher Glenn. Executive producer: Joel Heller. Producer: Walter Lister. Director: Vern Diamond.
14	What's the Senate All About?	Sat., April 12, 1975, 1 p.m.
This special looks at the U.S. Senate, focusing on its powers and history. Roger Mudd interviews Sen. Charles McCurdy Mathias Jr. of Maryland, who compares his work in the Senate with his earlier work in the House of Representatives. Host: Roger Mudd. Executive producer: Joel Heller. Producer and writer: Walter Lister. Director: Richard Knox.
15	What's the CIA All About?	Sat., June 14, 1975, 12:00 p.m. Repeated on Tues., June 24, 1975, 10 p.m.
This special was inspired by the launch in 1975 of three investigations by the U.S. government of the Central Intelligence Agency (CIA): President Gerald R. Ford's Rockefeller Commission, the U.S. Senate's Church Committee, and the U.S. House of Representatives' Pike Committee. It includes a brief history of spying from ancient to modern times and of U.S. intelligence from the Pearl Harbor attack of December 7, 1941 to more recent U.S. operations in Latin America and the Caribbean. It defines the origins, functions, and workings of the agency, as well as arguments for and against its operations, including comments from President Ford and Sen. Frank Church of Idaho. Host: Daniel Schorr. Executive producer: Joel Heller. Producer and writer: Walter Lister. Director: Vern Diamond.
16	What's Apollo-Soyuz All About?	Sat., July 12, 1975, 12:00 p.m.
This special was broadcast days before Apollo-Soyuz, the first international space mission, in which an Apollo spacecraft from the United States docked with a Soyuz spacecraft from the Soviet Union. It summarizes the histories of the two nations' space programs and describes how the two crews were trained and what they intend to accomplish with their joint mission. Host: Walter Cronkite. Correspondents: Nelson Benton in Houston and Richard Roth in Moscow. Producer and writer: Walter Lister. Director: Richard Knox.
17	What's Communism All About?	Sat., October 18, 1975, 1:30 p.m.
Broadcast during the Cold War, this special looks at the Communist system of government. It opens with a simulation of a Communist-style election by a class of U.S. elementary school students and then describes the gap between the ideals and the realities of Communism. It also summarizes the history of the movement, including influential figures such as Karl Marx, Vladimir Lenin, Joseph Stalin, Nikita Krushchev, Mao Zedong, Fidel Castro, and Leonid Brezhnev. Reporting from Moscow, Richard Roth describes education and other aspects of daily life in the Soviet Union. Host: Christopher Glenn. Correspondent: Richard Roth. Executive producer: Joel Heller. Producer and writer: Walter Lister. Director: Richard Knox.
18	What's a City All About?	Sat., November 22, 1975, 1:30 p.m.
Taped in part from the top of the Empire State Building, this special aired a few weeks after President Gerald R. Ford refused to grant a bailout to New York City, which had been experiencing a severe fiscal crisis that brought it to the brink of bankruptcy. It explains the crisis and examines why many Americans view U.S. cities negatively, in addition to summarizing the benefits of cities. Host: Christopher Glenn. Correspondents: Trish Reilly and Joel Siegel. Executive producer and writer: Joel Heller. Producer: Walter Lister. Director: Alvin Thaler.
19	What Are the Loch Ness Monster and Other Monsters All About?	Sat., February 14, 1976, 1:30 p.m.
This special is about legendary monsters, focusing on the Loch Ness Monster and Bigfoot. Host: Christopher Glenn. Correspondents: Carol Martin and Joel Siegel. Executive producer: Joel Heller. Producer and writer: Walter Lister. Director: Alvin Thaler.
20	This Wild Race for the Presidency—What's It All About?	Sat., March 27, 1976, 1:30 p.m.
This special is a guide to the primaries in advance of the 1976 U.S. presidential election, including an examination of how delegates to the political conventions are selected and profiles of major candidates. Host: Christopher Glenn. Correspondents: Carol Martin and Joel Siegel. Executive producer: Joel Heller. Producer and writer: Walter Lister. Director: Richard Knox.
21	Saving Wild Animals—What's It All About?	Sat., May 15, 1976, 1:30 p.m.
Broadcast a few years after the enactment of the U.S. Endangered Species Act of 1973, this special focuses on the conservation of endangered species, such as whales, wolves, and bald eagles and includes a visit to the Bronx Zoo, where endangered animals are raised. Host: Christopher Glenn. Executive producer: Joel Heller. Producer: Walter Lister. Director: Richard Knox.
22	The Political Conventions—What Are They All About?	Sat., July 10, 1976, 1:30 p.m.
Broadcast shortly before the 1976 Democratic National Convention, held in New York City from July 12 to 15, 1976, this special examines political conventions. Host: Walter Cronkite. Executive producer: Joel Heller. Producer: Walter Lister. Director: Richard Knox.
23	The Presidential Election—What's It All About?	Sat., October 30, 1976, 1:30 p.m.
Broadcast from CBS News's Campaign '76 headquarters in New York shortly before the 1976 U.S. presidential election between President Gerald R. Ford and Gov. Jimmy Carter on November 2, 1976, this special explains how the U.S. president and vice president are chosen every four years, which Americans are qualified to vote, how the Electoral College works, and different ways of voting, from paper ballots to voting machines. Host: Walter Cronkite. Correspondents: Sylvia Chase, Morton Dean, and Christopher Glenn. Executive producer: Joel Heller. Producer: Vern Diamond.
24	Flying Saucers from Outer Space—What's It All About?	Sat., December 4, 1976, 1:30 p.m.
Through filmed reports, animated sequences, and dramatic reenactments, this special explores unidentified flying objects (UFOs) and the possibility of intelligent life on other planets and includes Christopher Glenn's investigation of a helicopter pilot's report of a UFO. Host: Christopher Glenn. Correspondent: Carol Martin Executive producer: Joel Heller. Producer and director: Vern Diamond. Writer: Joel Siegel.
25	Miss, Mrs., or Ms.—What's It All About?	Sat., May 21, 1977, 1:30 p.m.
This special uses filmed reports, animations, a quiz, and a simulated newscast to explore how the women's rights movement in the United States is transforming the traditional roles of both women and men. Hosts: Sylvia Chase and Christopher Glenn. Executive producer: Joel Heller. Producer and director: Vern Diamond. Writer: Ellen Schecter.
26	The Presidential Election—What's It All About?	Sat., November 1, 1980, 1:30 p.m.
Broadcast three days before the 1980 U.S. presidential election between President Jimmy Carter, former Gov. Ronald Reagan, and Rep. John B. Anderson, this special, taped from CBS News's election headquarters in New York, explains how officials are elected in the United States, how television projects election results, and the significance of voting. Host: Walter Cronkite. Correspondents: Betty Ann Bowser, Morton Dean, Christopher Glenn, Chris Kelly, and Bruce Morton. Executive producer: Joel Heller. Producer and director: Vern Diamond.

== Production ==
Although the major networks began producing children's programs in the early days of television in the 1940s, news programs aimed at young people were extremely rare until the 1970s. One of the few was Youth Takes a Stand, which premiered in 1953, in which a panel of four high school students discussed issues such as whether schools should ban debates over whether the People's of Republic of China should be recognized by the United Nations. In the early 1970s, ABC, CBS, and NBC began to significantly expand educational and informational programming for children in response to pressure from the advocacy group Action for Children's Television (ACT) and threats of new federal regulation. In 1968, Peggy Charren, a mother who was appalled by what her children saw on television, cofounded ACT to improve children's television, which she and her colleagues regarded as an overly commercialized wasteland. In 1970 ACT petitioned the Federal Communications Commission (FCC) to issue new rules. The FCC declined, but in 1974 it released its "Children's Television Report and Policy Statement," in which it set forth policies and guidelines it expected broadcasters to comply with, but left compliance to industry self-regulation. Among other things, it stated that broadcasters should provide a reasonable amount of programming "designed to educate and inform—and not merely to entertain."

Testifying before Congress in 1973, Arthur R. Taylor, CBS's president, frankly acknowledged that public attention to the deficiencies in children's television programming had led the network to develop new informational and educational series like What's It All About? The first of CBS's programs in this vein was In the Know, two-and-one-half-minute informational segments that premiered in September 1970 and aired between Saturday morning cartoons; aimed at kids 6 to 12, it was hosted by characters from the animated series Josie and the Pussycats and featured live-action films on subjects like volcanoes, watchmaking, lunar rovers, iron-ore mining, and the construction of the Eiffel Tower. Encouraged by its success, in September 1971 In the News, which Heller produced and Christopher Glenn anchored, was introduced. In a 1982 Gallup survey of 1,010 teen-agers, nearly 90 percent stated that these segments had informed them about the world when they were younger and nearly half declared that they were a major source of information about current events. That same month CBS launched You Are There, anchored by Walter Cronkite—"eyewitness" reenactments of historic events like the trial of Socrates, Paul Revere's ride, the Lewis and Clark Expedition, and the disappearance of Amelia Earhart.

Then in the summer of 1972, CBS debuted What's It All About? In contrast to You Are Here, it focused on contemporary rather than historical topics in the news. The core production team—Diamond, Heller, and Lister—was the same team that produced In the News. They essentially expanded the short news segments they produced for In the News into a 30-minute format that allowed them to examine more complex subjects in greater depth, like the Middle East and Communism. In addition, as Heller remarked, the popularity of In the News showed "that children are quite interested in and will readily understand news—news of realities we usually think of as relevant only to adults—when the information is presented appropriately." CBS's commitment to the program was demonstrated by the fact that the news division's most prominent correspondents, notably Cronkite, anchor of the flagship CBS Evening News with Walter Cronkite, served as hosts or reporters.

The first special, hosted by Cronkite and with reports by Dan Rather, Daniel Schorr, and Mike Wallace, was What's a Convention All About?, which aired on Saturday, July 8, 1972. The subject was inspired by the upcoming 1972 Democratic National Convention, held from July 10 to 13, in Miami Beach; an episode focusing on the 1972 Republican National Convention, held from August 21 to 23, also in Miami Beach, aired on August 19. Heller described the special as "a gavel-to-gavel explanation of how the convention will flow." Taped on location at the convention hall, it was a primer, explaining key concepts, introducing Sen. George McGovern, Sen. Hubert Humphrey, and other major candidates, and setting the convention in historical context. It was framed by a brief highlight clip from the 1968 Democratic National Convention in Chicago at the beginning and a slightly longer one at the end. Heller hoped that when viewers watched the latter clip, what was initially unfamiliar would now be comprehensible. He emphasized that the special was designed to inform adults as well as kids and that "there was never any hesitation by Cronkite to do it. They all feel they're still essentially doing informational television."

The number of What's It All About? specials that CBS committed to each year increased from three in 1972, to four in 1973 and five in 1974, peaking at six in each of 1975 and 1976, until dropping to one in 1977 and then none until the final special in 1980. Regarding the decline, Heller stated that by the mid-1970s he began to find the program's format too limiting. Specifically, he concluded that devoting 30 minutes to the examination of one subject taxed the short attention spans of many children and that the specials were becoming too much like lectures. He also found that there were fewer newsworthy topics to cover: "The world had quieted down. We weren't shooting rockets into space, the impeachment and Vietnamese war were over. We were running out of things to do." He decided to shift gears and focus on the development of a new informational program for children titled Razzmatazz, which premiered in April 1977, as well as other projects.

== Reception ==
=== Ratings ===
Public records of Nielsen ratings for What's It All About? and other daytime programs are not readily available. However, the prime-time broadcast of What's the CIA All About? on June 24, 1975 received a 13.5 rating and a 27 share and was ranked as the 248th most-watched special of the 1974–1975 television season.

=== Reviews ===
John J. O'Connor, television critic for the New York Times, described the series as "outstanding." His colleague Howard Thompson was equally complimentary. Cecil Smith of the Los Angeles Times commented that "these 'What's It All About…?' specials, produced by Joel Heller, who does these excellent news spots for kids—In the News—are not only great kid shows but can be quite valuable on the adult level." Kay Gardella, television critic for the Daily News, wrote: "This series of CBS News presentations for young folks cannot be praised too highly. In fact, it's probably one of the best, if not the best, efforts put forth on children's programs, since it has a very practical outlook. It tells the youngsters basic facts they need to know today in this fast-moving society."

=== Awards ===
In 1973, What's an Election All About? and What's a Convention All About? received ACT's Achievements in Children's Television Award for children's news specials.

In 1974, What's Impeachment All About? and What's the Energy Crisis All About? were each nominated for an Emmy Award for Outstanding Informational Children's Series. That same year What's the Supreme Court All About? received a Silver Gavel Award from the American Bar Association.

In 1976, What Are the Loch Ness and Other Monsters All About? was nominated for an Emmy Award for Outstanding Informational Children's Special.

== Home media ==
What's It All About? has not been officially released on DVD and is not available on streaming platforms.

However, What's the Presidency All About? is available on YouTube on the channel of the Museum of Classic Chicago Television (www.FuzzyMemories.TV).

The following episodes are in the collection of the Paley Archive at the Paley Museum in New York: What's the Energy Crisis All About? (1973), What's the Supreme Court All About? (1973), What's Inflation All About? (1974), What's Congress All About? (1974), What's the Senate All About (1975), What's Apollo-Soyuz All About? (1975), What's Communism All About? (1975), What's a City All About? (1975), and Saving Wild Animals—What's It All About? (1976). In addition, the following episodes are available at the Paley Archive at the Beverly Hills Public Library: What's the Energy Crisis All About? (1973) and What's Communism All About? (1975).
