= Razzmatazz (American TV series) =

American television series

- Genre: News magazine
- Directed by: Vern Diamond
- Presented by: Barry Bostwick; Brian Tochi
- Country of origin: United States
- Original language: English
- No. of episodes: 16 (excluding repeats)

Production
- Executive producer: Joel Heller
- Producer: Vern Diamond
- Production locations: New York City, New York, United States
- Running time: 30 minutes (pilot 60 minutes)
- Production company: CBS News in association with Scholastic

Original release
- Network: CBS
- Release: April 16, 1977 – November 6, 1982

Related
- In the News; What's It All About?; 30 Minutes

Razzmatazz is an Emmy Award–winning television newsmagazine aimed primarily at preteen viewers that was produced by CBS News in association with Scholastic and that aired on CBS for 16 original and 13 repeat episodes from April 16, 1977 to November 6, 1982. It was produced by the same production team as CBS's other award-winning news programs for young people, including executive producer Joel Heller and producer/director Vern Diamond. The original host was Barry Bostwick. Beginning with the February 1, 1979 episode, Brian Tochi served as the host, and Don Herbert, known as Mr. Wizard, hosted segments on science.

Razzmatazz was not a weekly series. Instead, episodes aired every few weeks, and occasionally months passed between airings. Its original time slot was Saturdays at 1:30 p.m., after the conclusion of CBS's Saturday morning cartoon block. Beginning with the April 13, 1978 episode, it moved to Thursday afternoons at 4 p.m., after the end of the school day. Then beginning with the February 1, 1979 episode, it generally aired on the first Thursday (later, the first Tuesday) of each month at 4 p.m. Specific broadcast times could vary from station to station.

== Production team ==
Joel Heller was the executive producer of Razzmatazz. He was an experienced CBS News producer who had produced numerous informational programs for children for the network since 1961. He was the executive producer for the Emmy Award–winning news segments for kids titled In the News, which aired from 1971 to 1987. Initially two-and-one-half minutes long, these segments aired during the Saturday morning children's programming block between cartoons. Beginning in 1972, he also produced What's It All About?, a series of 30-minute specials that explained current issues to kids. While continuing to produce Razzmatazz, he created 30 Minutes, an award-winning television newsmagazine for high-school students. In 1979, he was named director, children's programs, at CBS News.

Vern Diamond was the producer/director of Razzmatazz. He was a veteran producer and director who began working in television in the 1940s and at CBS in the early 1950s. He was known for having directed major special events, such as the 1960 Winter Olympics and repeated iterations of the Miss America Pageant, the Miss Universe Pageant, and the Tournament of Roses Parade. In the early 1970s, he began working with Heller on programs produced by CBS News, including What’s It All About?, which aired from 1972 to 1980. The two collaborated regularly until the 1980s.

Barry Bostwick was the host of the pilot and for the first seven episodes of Razzmatazz. When he began filming, he was a 31-year-old actor who had appeared in a handful of films, including The Rocky Horror Picture Show, in which he played Brad Majors. He was also well-known for his work in theater. He received Tony Award nominations in 1972 for his role in the musical Grease and in 1976 for his role in the play They Knew What They Wanted. In addition, in 1977, a few weeks after the pilot for Razzmatazz aired, he won a Tony Award for Best Actor in a Musical for The Robber Bridegroom.

Brian Tochi was the program's host for the final nine original episodes. When he became the new host, he was a 19-year-old actor who had appeared in numerous television programs as a child and teenager, including episodes of Star Trek, The Brady Bunch, and Kung Fu. He was also a regular cast member on two CBS Saturday morning series: The Amazing Chan and the Chan Clan, an animated series in which he voiced Alan Chan, and Space Academy, a live-action science fiction series, in which he played Tee Gar Soom, a young doctor with superhuman strength and martial arts skills. Before being selected as host, he had appeared on the January 28, 1978 episode of Razzmatazz in a segment on how the special effects in Space Academy are created.

Don Herbert, known as Mr. Wizard, explained and demonstrated scientific concepts in the final nine episodes. He had taught children about science on television since the 1950s, commencing with the program Watch Mr. Wizard. He often described himself as the quintessential high-school science teacher.

== Format ==
Razzmatazz is a television newsmagazine loosely modeled after news programs like 60 Minutes and 1970s magazines for kids like Dynamite, Bananas, and Wow, all published by Scholastic. Heller stated that "in the true sense of a magazine, there'll be something new on every page." Drawing on his extensive experience producing brief informational segments for both radio and television, each episode typically consists of four or five short features rather than one story. These segments were only as long as was necessary to tell the respective story; thus, they could range from one-and-a-half to several minutes.

The pilot of Razzmatazz was 60 minutes, and each subsequent episode was 30 minutes. Each episode began with the title song “Now’s the Time for Razzmatazz.” The host (Bostwick, and later Tochi) traveled across the United States to visit young people with extraordinary talents, skills, hobbies, or lives or to explore unusual places. Subjects ranged from three young brothers who were stunt drivers, to a teenage girl who piloted a sailplane glider, a boy who created an insect zoo in his bedroom, a girl who had not watched television for five years, and teenage members of a volunteer fire department. They also included visits to the 1977 National Jamboree of the Boy Scouts of America, an animation studio where a popular cartoon was produced, and the International Balloon Fiesta in Albuquerque, New Mexico. A few of the first episodes included segments produced by editors from Scholastic, including games and polls that mirrored features in the youth magazines that the company published. The last nine episodes included segments hosted by Mr. Wizard, some of which were filmed in the studio and some on location. Bostwick ended each of the episodes he hosted with the phrase, “We’re glad you could be watching to meet some of the interesting people and visit some of the fascinating places that make up our world.”

Each episode was lively, fast-paced, and peppered with a sense of adventure and humor from the charismatic hosts. While the segments were designed primarily to entertain, they also sought to inspire viewers to explore their own individual pursuits. In addition, many were educational, teaching about subjects ranging from the plight of endangered species to how coal is mined. In this respect, Razzmatazz shared affinities not only with Heller’s previous television projects such as In the Know, In the News, and What’s It All About?, but with other informational children’s programs of the era, including Animals, Animals, Animals (ABC), Big Blue Marble (syndicated), Go (NBC), and Rebop (PBS).

== Episodes ==
No. overall	Original release date	Prod. code
1	Sat., April 16, 1977	
Pilot. The Keane Brothers, a pop duo consisting of Tom (13) and John (11), based in Encino, CA, who would host a four-episode variety show on CBS in the summer of 1977. A 16-year-old girl raising a lion in Louisville, KY. Two young trapeze artists from Miami Beach, FL who perform for the Ringling Bros. and Barnum & Bailey Circus. An aerial tour of the Bay Area by a radio traffic reporter in San Francisco. Oil spills and their impact on wildlife, inspired in part by the Argo Merchant spill off of Nantucket, MA in 1976.
2	Sat, November 5, 1977	New series, vol. 1, no. 1
Three brothers from Chicago—Lou Sipolt Jr. (15), Mike Sipolt (14), and Marc “Sparky” Sipolt (9)—who are stunt drivers performing as the World’s Youngest Professional Daredevils. Stephanie Mills (19), who starred as Dorothy in the Broadway musical, The Wiz. Annetraud Hammer (72), who owns the world’s oldest pet, a 62-year-old turtle named Iphigenia she acquired when she was 10. Scholastic and Kodak’s annual photography contest for kids, featuring winner Alice Sebrell of Charlotte, NC. The Back Street Flyers, an acrobatic team from Harlem including students from Charles Evan Hughes High School in New York who also attend the New York School for Circus Arts. Efforts to protect dolphins from being killed by tuna fishing.
3	Sat, December 24, 1977	New series, vol. 1, no. 2
The Fort Walton Beach High School marching banding in Florida, which demonstrates how it creates its elaborate formations. The 1977 National Jamboree of the Boy Scouts of America in Moraine State Park, PA, including a visit with a Navajo troop from Nevada and Arizona. Michael Hurwitz (16) and his brother Mitchell Hurwitz (13), who own and operate a successful chocolate chip cookie business called the Chipyard in Newport Beach, CA, to raise money for college. A game from Scholastic editors, in which viewers are shown baby pictures of celebrities like Cindy Williams and Joe Namath and must guess who they are. Monique Hagopian, a girl who wrote a letter to the editor published in the New York Times on May 7, 1977, when she was 13, explaining why she has not watched television for five years. Field Day, the day each year when amateur radio operators move their stations outdoors, trying to make as many contacts as possible during a 24-hour-period.
4	Sat, January 28, 1978	New series, vol. 2, no. 1
A visit to the set of Space Academy, CBS’s Saturday morning science fiction series, to explore how its special effects are created, with designer Paul Huston, model builder Dave Jones, actor Brian Tochi, who plays Tee Gar Soom, and Dick Brown, who operates the robot Peepo. Valerie Robbin (14), a student from Uruguay at Horace Greeley High School in Chappaqua, NY, who waged a successful legal fight to compete on the boys’ soccer team. The 1977 World Frisbee Championship at the Rose Bowl in Pasadena, CA, featuring champion disc dog Ashley Whippet. A game from Scholastic editors, in which viewers must guess what four notable historical figures have in common (they are all left-handed), followed by an explainer on left-handedness. John Salisbury (15), who has turned a corner of his bedroom into an insect zoo, including an interview with his advisor, entomologist Lynda Richards of the Live Insect Zoo at the Smithsonian Institution in Washington, DC.
5	Sat., February 25, 1978	New series, vol. 2, no. 2
Derrek Wagoner (17) and his sister Teri Wagoner (16), team ropers competing in the Trailriders’ National Little Britches Rodeo in Belen, NM, for rodeo performers ages 8 to 18. The 1977 National Hula Hoop Championship at Six Flags over Georgia, whose contestants are 15 or younger. The Food and Maritime Trades High School, a New York school where students preparing for maritime careers take some of their classes on the boat SS John W. Brown, including comments from teacher Van Loo and student Sherwood Herben. A game from Scholastic editors in which viewers are shown postage stamps from different countries featuring animals and then must guess which animal has the longest lifespan, followed by an explainer on endangered species. Jack, a six-year-old fox terrier who appears in television commercials, and his trainer, Lisa Sacks.
6	Thurs, April 13, 1978	New series, vol. 2, no. 3
Vicky Barrett (17), who pilots a sailplane glider at the Skylark Gliderport in California, which is owned and operated by her family. A tour of the Coal Mine, a realistic re-creation of a coal mine at the Museum of Science and Industry in Chicago, a segment inspired by the long-running Bituminous Coal Strike of 1977–1978. Bill and Marcia Levy, filmmakers who discuss the challenges of filming wildlife like cheetahs, elephants, and antelopes. The alpine slide—a series of long chutes following a ski trail—at the Camelback Ski Resort in Tannersville, PA, which operates during the summer, including a race between Bostwick and Jo Ann Miceli (12).
7	Thurs, May 11, 1978	New series, vol. 2, no. 4
The Wilson Technological Center in Long Island, NY, where 70 junior and senior high-school students study horse care and management. The No Plaque Shack, a voluntary dental hygiene program at East Juniata High School in Cocolamus, PA. A visit to the studio of CBS Radio Mystery Theater, as the episode “The Golden Amulet” is being recorded, including comments from producer/director Himan Brown and actress Evelyn Juster. Fourth-grade students who took a field trip to photograph New York's Chinatown with photographer Hilda Bijur. A scout master takes scouts through the handicap awareness trail at the 1977 National Jamboree of the Boy Scouts of America.
8	Thurs, June 8, 1978	New series, vol. 2, no. 5
Repeat of January 28, 1978 episode.
9	Thurs, February 1, 1979	New series, vol. 3, no. 1
The New Bolton Center Hospital at the University of Pennsylvania's School of Veterinary Medicine, which treats large animals like horses and cows and specializes in surgery, including comments from veterinary technician Cathy Burns (19). The International Balloon Fiesta in Albuquerque, NM, where Tochi rides in a hot-air balloon with Wally Short and his son Kevin and explains how these balloons work. Scholastic’s National Institute of Student Opinion poll on what most kids would order if they had to order food and drinks for a group of friends but did not know their individual preferences (pizza and soft drinks). Mr. Wizard explains what calories are and demonstrates how they are calculated. Mary Ann Gilman (15), an apprentice engineer who pilots a Canadian Pacific steam engine locomotive in Vermont, under the direction of veteran engineer Andy Barbera.
10	Thurs, March 1, 1979	New series, vol. 3, no. 2
Direction Sports, a program that leverages kids’ interest in sports to encourage them to focus on education and change the direction of their lives for the better, including comments from a group of inner-city kids in Chicago who participate in the program and their leader, Rev. Bill Samuels. The Moffit kids—Andrea (16), John (12), and Michael (8)—who live on Liberty Island in New York, where their father David Moffitt is superintendent of the Statue of Liberty National Monument. A story narrated by Tochi about two airplane passengers who thought they saw a UFO, which was really just an optical illusion, followed by a segment in which Mr. Wizard explains what optical illusions are and demonstrates how they can be created. A motocross event at Raceway Park in Englishtown, NJ, including a visit with Hank Knabe (19), who has been racing since he was 12.
11	Thurs, April 5, 1979	New series, vol. 3, no. 3
A visit to Virgin Islands National Park, which includes thousands of acres of offshore underwater habitat, on the charter sloop North Star with teenagers Jodie Lawaetz and Amy Lawaetz, who live on St. Croix. The teenage members of the Harrington Park, NJ volunteer fire department, including Danny Harrison. Scholastic’s National Institute of Student Opinion poll on what teenagers do with their money (mostly spend it on clothes). Mr. Wizard explains how special effects, like the green screens used on Razzmatazz, work. The Maclay Finals at the National Horse Show at Madison Square Garden in New York, where junior riders 18 and younger compete.
12	Tues, May 1, 1979	New series, vol. 3, no. 4
Thomas Buoniello (15), who raises Siberian and Alaskan huskies with his family on Long Island. A family in the Virgin Islands who live on a 44-foot-long sailboat called La Boheme, in which the six children are homeschooled by their mother with course materials from the Calvert School in Baltimore. An explanation by Tochi of palindromes. Mr. Wizard demonstrates how to yank a tablecloth out from under dishes and describes the role of concepts like inertia, force, and speed. How the employees of the Clyde Beatty–Cole Bros. Circus move their big top circus tent.
13	Thurs, June 7, 1979	New series, vol. 3, no. 5
J’Anna Jacoby (14) of Redding, CA, whom American Girl magazine selected as the All-American Girl of 1979 because in 1978 she became the first female to win the Grand Masters Fiddler Competition, sponsored by the Grand Ole Opry. Irv Gikovsky, a meteorologist who is a weather forecaster on Channel 2 in New York and a science teacher at I.S. 131 Albert Einstein School in the Bronx, where he organized a weather club for students. Mr. Wizard explains what dry ice is and demonstrates how to create phenomena like clouds with it. Sharon Grammer (15) of North Linthicum, MD, a female goalie for the Benfield Flames, a youth hockey team that competes in the Capital Beltway Hockey League (later renamed the Chesapeake Bay Hockey League). Young clowns from the Clyde Beatty–Cole Bros. Circus in Vero Beach, FL, including Jeff Starroff (19) and Paul Cohen, discussing their profession.
14	Tues, July 3, 1979	New series, vol. 3, no. 6
Repeat of February 1, 1979 episode.
15	Tues, August 7, 1979	New series, vol. 3, no. 7
Repeat of March 1, 1979 episode.
16	Tues, September 4, 1979	New series, vol. 3, no. 8
Repeat of April 6, 1979 episode.
17	Tues, October 2, 1979	New series, vol. 3, no. 9
Janet Helton (16) of Riverside, CA, the youngest aerobatic flyer in the United States, who began flying at 14 with her father, an airline pilot, and flies in a home-built plane. A wind generator supplying electricity for Dorney Park, an amusement park near Allentown, PA, including comments from Bob Plarr, one of the park’s owners. Mr. Wizard demonstrates how to launch an oil can and explains Newton’s Third Law of Motion, the law of action and reaction. A visit to Filmation, an animation company in Hollywood, where members of the crew that produces Mighty Mouse explain how animated series are created, including comments from storyboard director Bob Kline, animation director Kay Wright, animator Franco Christofani, and camera operator Dean Trevis.
18	Tues, February 5, 1980	New series, vol. 4, no. 1
A visit with Jeanne Berry (14), National Junior Bowling Champion, at a bowling alley in Charleston Heights, NV, with comments from professional bowling champion Don Johnson. Williamsburg, MA chimney sweep Ken Hinkley, who often works with his daughter, Becky (14). Mr. Wizard demonstrates how to make giant soap bubbles. Animal trainer Frank Inn’s facility in Southern California, where coach, trainer, and agent Fred Dean explains how animal actors like the Dobermans in The Boys from Brazil are trained.
19	Tues, May 6, 1980	New series, vol. 4, no. 2
A training seminar for police bloodhounds in Louisville, KY sponsored by the National Police Bloodhound Association. Rick Hovey (13), who works at his father’s classic car business in Phoenix and helps restore vintage automobiles. Mr. Wizard explains how the cable cars of San Francisco work. New York's Pyrotechnics Products, Inc., the largest manufacturer of professional display fireworks in the United States, owned and operated by the Grucci family.
20	Tues, July 1, 1980	New series, vol. 4, no. 3
Repeat of May 1, 1979 episode.
21	Tues, August 5, 1980	New series, vol. 4, no. 4
Repeat of June 7, 1979 episode.
22	Sat, August 16, 1980	New series, vo. 4, no. 5
Repeat of October 2, 1979 episode.
23	Sat, August 23, 1980	New series, vol. 4, no. 6
Repeat of February 5, 1980 episode.
24	Tues, September 2, 1980	New series, vol. 4, no. 7
The penguin colony at the Hubbs-SeaWorld Research Institute in San Diego, where curator Frank Todd brought the first individuals in 1975, including comments from curator Scott Drieschmann. Mr. Wizard visits The Geysers, the world’s largest geothermal power complex and steam field, north of San Francisco. The Movieland Wax Museum in Buena Park, CA, including comments from the artist Logan Fleming, who explains how he creates the wax figures of celebrities exhibited at the museum.
25	Tues, July 7, 1981	New series, vol. 5, no. 1
Repeat of May 6, 1980 episode.
26	Tues, August 4, 1981	New series, vol. 5, no. 2
Repeat of September 2, 1980 episode.
27	Sat., October 2, 1982	New series, vol. 6, no. 1
Repeat of September 2, 1980 episode.
28	Sat., October 16, 1982	New series, vol. 6, no. 2
Repeat of May 6, 1980 episode.
29	Sat., November 6, 1982	New series, vol. 6, no. 3
Repeat of August 16, 1980 episode.

== Production ==
In response to pressure from the advocacy group Action for Children's Television (ACT), led by activist Peggy Charren, and later the threat of new regulation from the Federal Communications Commission (FCC) under the leadership of Charles D. Ferris, CBS and the other networks began expanding their educational and informational programming for children in the early 1970s, a process that accelerated through the end of the decade. The first of CBS's programs was In the Know, two-and-one-half-minute informational segments that premiered in September 1970 and aired between Saturday morning cartoons; aimed at kids 6 to 12, it was hosted by characters from the animated series Josie and the Pussycats and featured live-action films on subjects like volcanoes, watchmaking, lunar rovers, iron-ore mining, and the construction of the Eiffel Tower. Encouraged by its success, in September 1971 In the News, which Heller produced and Christopher Glenn anchored, was introduced. That same month CBS launched You Are There, anchored by Walter Cronkite—"eyewitness" reenactments of historic events like the trial of Socrates, Paul Revere's ride, the Lewis and Clark Expedition, and the disappearance of Amelia Earhart. In 1972, Heller created and became the executive producer of What's It All About?, a series of 30-minute specials that explained current issues to kids. In each special, a CBS News correspondent, such as Sylvia Chase, Walter Cronkite, Christopher Glenn, Roger Mudd, or Daniel Schorr, anchored a report on a newsworthy subject to young viewers. For example, episodes were devoted to the 1974 Congressional and gubernatorial elections, inflation, the Middle East, the CIA, and the Apollo-Soyuz mission, among other subjects. By the mid-1970s, however, Heller believed that What's It All About? had covered most of the timely subjects worth covering. In addition, he concluded that devoting 30 minutes to a single subject taxed the short attention spans of many children and that the specials were becoming too much like lectures.

Heller consequently envisioned a new type of children's informational program that he described as "more up to date and reflective of the Saturday morning pace," which eventually became Razzmatazz. The title, which means "noisy and exciting activity meant to attract attention," captures the youthful exuberance he was striving for. In contrast to a more sedate CBS News correspondent, a young, attractive, charismatic actor with theatrical experience, Barry Bostwick, was selected as the program's host. And the program itself was structured as a series of short, fast-moving, action-oriented segments on a variety of subjects filmed on-location, instead of a 30-minute examination of a single newsworthy topic.

Razzmatazz was produced by CBS News in association with Scholastic, and it reflected the influence of the company’s popular publications for kids. Scholastic was an educational corporation best known for publishing magazines and books for elementary, middle-school, and high-school students. Among its most successful magazines in the 1970s were Dynamite (launched 1974), Bananas (launched 1975), and Wow (launched 1976). These lively magazines published content relevant to young people while seeking to interest them in recreational reading without their realizing it. Scholastic also produced filmstrips, records, and other audiovisual materials under the auspices of its Audiovisual and New Media Department, directed by vice president Russell D'Anna. In 1977, D'Anna was charged with developing television and film projects for the company. In 1978, he became the director of a new division for such projects. The program's snappy title, magazine-like format, and tone, as well as specific features created by the company’s editors that were included in the first few episodes, reflected Scholastic's brand.

Razzmatazz was targeted primarily to preteen viewers. Because Heller believed that preteens tended to regard teenagers as role models, to inspire these viewers he showcased in the program the diverse pursuits of teenagers across the country. As he stated, "We try to show positive things, to give people the incentive to do things on their own …. I want to show them the opportunities they have to do things and all the areas they can be interested in." He also wanted to emphasize "the infinite ways in which young people are enthusiastically enjoying and participating in life—life in the real world. … The stress … is on the positive, on the real pleasure that these young people are getting from their success, no matter what the endeavor." Similarly, John Sharnick, then head of children's programs at CBS, defined the program as "reality treated in a form that is engaging as well as informative. Its spirit will reflect an interest in people—especially young people working, playing, going about their daily lives with zest."

The hour-long pilot for Razzmatazz began filming in January 1977 and aired on Saturday, April 16, 1977 at 1 p.m. The last original episode aired on September 2, 1980. No further episodes were broadcast until the summer of 1981, when CBS aired two repeats, followed by three more repeats in the fall of 1982, after which it quietly cancelled the program. At this time, the network was gradually retreating from educational and informational programming for children, dropping many of programs it had launched in the 1970s. Although the program's cancellation was barely noticed in the media, one journalist suggested that its disappearance was unsurprising: "In the hierarchy of concerns that preoccupy CBS News management, 'what should we be doing for children?' ranks pretty far down the list. 'Razzmatazz,' for example, was killed to save other things deemed more important." The implication was that the program was cancelled so that 30 Minutes, CBS's award-winning, critically acclaimed, but expensive-to-produce newsmagazine for teenagers, could continue. In fact, in April 1978, Variety had reported that Razzmatazz had been cancelled because producing both shows was too expensive for the network; the last original episode aired on September 2, 1980. In a sense, the program continued beyond that date because the second half of the fourth and last season of 30 Minutes, which aired in the spring of 1982, frequently broadcast repeats of segments that had originally aired on Razzmatazz.

== Reception ==
=== Ratings ===
Public records of Nielsen ratings for Razzmatazz and other daytime programs are not readily available. However, one journalist reported that ratings for the pilot were "respectable." A news item published in the April 5, 1978 issue of Variety stated that the program had "performed quite satisfactorily, according to Robert Chandler, veepee and director of pubaffairs for CBS News."

=== Reviews ===
Reviewing the pilot, Lee Margulies of the Los Angeles Times described Razzmatazz as "fresh and interesting" and praised Bostwick as "able and energetic." In a subsequent review, he commented: "Razzmatazz has enough concern for its audience that it is willing to tell them there are alternatives to sitting in front of the tube. It seeks, with humor and energy, to stimulate children's interest in the world around them. That's television with a purpose."

John J. O'Connor, television critic for the New York Times, described the pilot as "polished to a high gloss. The content is certainly preferable to the glut of cartoons on the Saturday morning schedule. And Mr. Bostwick is attractive and charmingly affable." Reviewing the program again after several episodes had aired, he remarked that it "has its enthusiastically participating heart in the right place. What the series needs now is more substance and the willingness, at least occasionally, to get beneath surfaces that are as slick and empty as a commercial for a soft drink."

A critic for Variety lauded the pilot as "a slick and sprightly hour that looked capable of attracting and holding kidvid audience" and praised the network's decision to hire a performer instead of a CBS News correspondent as host, writing that Bostwick: "brings an actor's ease and pleasing personality to the chore, communicates well and he handled the interviewing duties as capably as any newsman. As a result, the show talks to rather than at the target audience—and it should work out very nicely." This critic was equally complimentary in a follow-up review: "The pace was good, the segments were all newsworthy (and mostly involved teenagers), and all-in-all, 'Razzmatazz' came over as informative and entertaining programming for the older child audience that might conceivably be worth a primetime one-shot sometime to see if it could cut the mustard in the 'family hour.'" However, this critic preferred Bostwick to Tochi as host. Although he praised the latter's "youthful exuberance," he stated that Tochi had "a less balanced approach to the job than Bostwick gave it."

Kay Gardella, television critic for the Daily News, also praised the pilot: "It's a potpourri of fascinating offbeat reports on young people around the country involved in bizarre interests …. Much is packed into this lively hour …. Bostwick is a good host, and the program should have wide appeal among the young as well as adult viewers." In a syndicated review, an anonymous critic observed: "Perhaps the adult underdog lover has just a niggling feeling that all the kids on this program are a little too competent, a little too successful, and over-poweringly articulate. But the peers of these pre-teen and teen-age talents may appreciate teen-age maturity more than they would little kid cuteness." By contrast, Tom Dorsey, television critic for The Courier-Journal, was less complimentary: "It's a mixed bag—not particularly great or terrible, but better than a lot of what passes for kids' programs on Saturday mornings this season."

== Awards ==
In 1978, Razzmatazz received an award from Action for Children's Television (ACT) for making a significant contribution toward improving children's television in the miniseries category. In 1979, it received an Emmy Award for Outstanding Children's Informational Special.

== Home media ==
Razzmatazz has not been officially been released on DVD and is not available on streaming platforms. Transcripts of all episodes, usually catalogued under the title CBS News Public Affairs Broadcasts, are available on microfiche in the collections of select libraries in the United States.
