= 30 Minutes (TV program) =

American television series

- Genre: News magazine
- Presented by: Christopher Glenn; Betsy Aaron; Betty Ann Bowser
- Country of origin: United States
- Original language: English
- No. of seasons: 4
- No. of episodes: 74 (excluding repeats)

Production
- Executive producer: Joel Heller
- Producers: Madeline Amgott; Nancy Baer; Ken Baldwin; Elliot Bernstein; John Block; Jo Ann Caplin; Vern Diamond; Nancy M. Dutty; Diego Echeverria; Virginia Gray; Judith Hole; Christine Huneke; Horace Jenkins; Michael Joseloff; Roz Karson; Michelle Kay; Carolyn Kresky; Elisabeth Lawrence; Susan Mills; Catherine Olian; Richard Purow; Robert Rubin; Gail Sikevitz; Martin Smith; Patti Obrow White; Tom Yellin
- Production locations: New York City, New York, United States
- Camera setup: Single-camera
- Running time: 30 minutes
- Production company: CBS News Production

Original release
- Network: CBS
- Release: September 16, 1978 – August 28, 1982

Related
- 60 Minutes

30 Minutes is a television newsmagazine for high-school students produced by Joel Heller for CBS News that aired on CBS for four seasons, from September 16, 1978 to August 28, 1982, for a total of 74 original episodes. For the first and second seasons, Betsy Aaron and Christopher Glenn were the coeditors, who reported and presented the stories; in the third season, Betty Ann Bowser replaced Aaron.

Except during the last half of the fourth season, each episode typically featured two primary segments, one reported by each editor, as well as a short segment on kids' legal rights, letters from viewers, or profiles of careers. Most stories focused on subjects of interest to teenagers, while some covered political or social issues rarely addressed in daytime children's programming. Although 30 Minutes received critical acclaim and numerous awards, it was cancelled for a variety of reasons, including low ratings, difficulty attracting advertiser support due to its mixed demographic of teenagers and adults, and the Federal Communications Commission's shift to a deregulatory approach to broadcasting, which meant that the networks faced less pressure to schedule educational and informational programming for children, which was typically less profitable than cartoons.

== Production team ==
The executive producer of 30 Minutes was Joel Heller, who recruited many former colleagues to the production team, including director Vern Diamond, editor Christopher Glenn, and certain producers. During the first and second seasons, Glenn and Betsy Aaron were the two coeditors; in this capacity, they both reported and presented stories. In the third season, Betty Ann Bowser replaced Aaron. Each editor typically worked on three stories at a time—writing one, filming a second, and editing a third; usually, they worked together only when they taped the program in the studio. During the first two seasons, attorney Patricia McGuire hosted a brief segment on legal issues titled "What's Right?"

Heller was a veteran CBS News producer who had produced numerous informational programs for children for the network since 1961. He was the executive producer for the Emmy Award–winning news segments for kids titled In the News, which aired from 1971 to 1987. Initially two-and-one-half minutes long, these segments aired during the Saturday morning children's programming block between cartoons. Beginning in 1972, Heller also produced What's It All About?, a series of 30-minute specials that explained current issues to kids. Later he produced the Emmy Award–winning Razzmatazz, a newsmagazine for kids 8 to 14 that aired from 1977 to 1982. In 1979, while continuing to serve as executive producer of 30 Minutes, he was named director, children's programs, at CBS News. In 1987, when the children's programs unit was effectively dissolved during a massive layoff at CBS News, he moved to the network's documentary unit.

Aaron was a respected television journalist. She began her broadcasting career as a reporter for a local station in Philadelphia in 1962. In 1972 she joined ABC News as an associate producer for the ABC Evening News in New York and was later based out of Chicago. In 1976 she joined CBS News as a reporter in the Atlanta bureau, and in 1977 she became a correspondent. She also anchored Newsbreak, news digests that aired during prime time. After she left 30 Minutes in 1979, she worked as a reporter for NBC, ABC, and CNN, and later returned to CBS. During her long career, she reported from conflict zones in Vietnam, Central America, and the Middle East.

Glenn was an experienced reporter, producer, and editor. In 1960, he broadcast for Armed Forces Broadcasting in South Korea and New York. Among other positions, he worked for WNEW, a radio station in New York, from 1964 to 1970 and Metromedia Radio News Network in Washington, DC, from 1970 to 1971. In the latter year he joined CBS News as a radio producer. He also became the reporter/narrator for In the News, where he produced over 5,000 segments and acquired substantial experience in reporting for kids. Beginning in 1973, he hosted several episodes of What's It All About? After 30 Minutes ended, he coanchored CBS News Nightwatch from 1982 to 1984 and later returned to CBS Radio, where he anchored World News Roundup from 1999 until shortly before his death in 2006.

Betty Ann Bowser was a pioneering reporter. She began her broadcasting career at WAVY, a local television station in the Norfolk, Virginia area, in 1966. She then moved to WTAR, another local station in the state. In 1974 she joined CBS News, where she reported both national and international stories, including the famine in Africa. After 30 Minutes concluded, she became a general assignment and later a health correspondent for PBS News Hour, covering stories such as the trial of the Oklahoma City bomber Timothy McVeigh, Hurricane Katrina, and the opioid epidemic, before retiring in 2013.

Patricia McGuire was an attorney who received her law degree from Georgetown University Law Center in Washington, DC. She began her legal career as project director for Georgetown's Street Law Program, founded in 1972, which placed law students in high schools to educate youths on the legal system. In 1989 she became the president of Trinity College in Washington, DC.

== Format ==
30 Minutes focused on stories of interest to high-school students, but it sought to appeal to both younger and older viewers as well. In an essay for a book on teenagers and television, Heller explained his broadcasting philosophy, which he applied to 30 Minutes: "As the teen years begin, young people regard the TV set as a minor source of their entertainment and an unimportant source of their information unless some event or some school assignment draws them to it. However, we can improve our news and public affairs programming for young people by making sure that what we do broadcast is relevant to their real needs."

During the first three-and-a-half seasons, each episode of 30 Minutes typically included two primary segments, one reported by each editor; each segment was about ten minutes long. During the second half of the fourth and final season, the program relied heavily on three-segment episodes with stories repeated from previous episodes and from Razzmatazz, presumably because of budget constraints. Heller stated: "The stories not only are of interest to young people, but deal with matters that in a very real way touch the lives of the young …. It is our intention to bring them news stories that directly relate to their own concerns, worries and beliefs."

Stories addressed a range of subjects of interest to teenagers, from the treatments available to individuals with acne to high-school marching bands, the effectiveness of driver's education, and young models and bodybuilders. Some covered political subjects in the news, such as kids growing up in the war-torn Middle East or Northern Ireland, young refugees arriving in the United States from Southeast Asia after the Vietnam War, and children and teenagers recruited by the Ku Klux Klan. Many were inspired by recent events in the news, such as President Jimmy Carter's proposal to reinstitute registration for the military draft in response to the Iran hostage crisis that began in 1979 and the serial killings of Black youths in Atlanta from 1979 to 1981.

30 Minutes is best remembered, however, for addressing sensitive social issues, such as suicide, child abuse, anorexia nervosa, and sexually transmitted disease; the effects of parental alcoholism or divorce on kids; and teenage marriage, homosexuality, and runaways. While prime-time newsmagazines like 60 Minutes and some daytime talk shows, like The Phil Donahue Show, covered such topics, it was exceedingly rare in the late 1970s and early 1980s for daytime children's programs to do so (exceptions include episodes of the ABC Afterschool Specials, CBS Afternoon Playhouse, and NBC Special Treat, which occasionally dealt with controversial subjects, but through drama). Glenn emphasized that these stories were reported under the same rigorous standards the evening news followed, and Aaron declared: "Sometimes I think we should run a disclaimer …. Something like: Warning—this language could be offensive to your parents." These segments were particularly valuable to young viewers who were facing these challenges alone.

30 Minutes also regularly featured three short segments. During the first two seasons, most episodes ended with "What's Right?," which examined legal issues of concern to teenagers, such as whether school principals have the right to search students' lockers, whether teachers can use corporal punishment to discipline students, and who is responsible if a teenager wrecks a car that he or she does not own. Heller explained that the goal was to "try to make the kids—and adults—aware of both their recourses and their responsibilities as we describe types of conflicts and explore the stands that could legally be taken." These segments were presented by the attorney Patricia McGuire of Georgetown University Law Center's Street Law Program. Initially, they were filmed with both anchors in the studio; later, they were filmed on location with only one. In the third season, "Letters to 30 Minutes" was introduced. In the fourth, "What It Takes" was added. For this segment, adults explained how they had succeeded in their careers; guests included an actor, a newspaper critic, a lawyer, a veterinarian, a police officer, an advertising executive, and a pilot.

== Episodes ==
=== Season 1 (1978–79) ===
No. overall	No. in season	Title	Original release date	Prod. code
1	1	"Southroad Connection" / "Zapping the Zits"	September 16, 1978	2501
"Southroad Connection": Glenn on Southroad Connection, a rock band formed by teenagers from White Plains, NY, who are trying to succeed (produced by Elliot Bernstein). "Zapping the Zits": Aaron on treatments for acne (produced by Madeline Amgott). "What's Right?": Can principals search students' lockers?
2	2	"The Boys in the Big House" / "Inside MAD Magazine"	September 23, 1978	2502
"The Boys in the Big House": Glenn speaks with juvenile offenders at Kansas State Industrial Reformatory, a maximum-security prison for adults in Hutchinson, KS, to ask whether juveniles should be held in adult prisons (produced by Jo Ann Caplin). "Inside MAD Magazine": Aaron on the popular satirical humor magazine (produced by Caplin). "What's Right?": Do teenagers have the right to sue a store if it does not refund their money for faulty merchandise?
3	3	"School Censorship" / "The Shaun Cassidy Cult"	October 7, 1978	2503
"School Censorship": Glenn on Jonathan Diamond and Jane Kauffman, drama students at Princeton High School in Princeton, NJ, who sued when Principal George Petrillo censored potentially offensive language from their production of Michael Weller's play Moonchildren (produced by Patti Obrow White). "The Shaun Cassidy Cult": Aaron on the fascination with the teen idol, focusing on Inga Georges, a teenager who won an opportunity to meet him (produced by White). "What's Right?": Can teenagers join a religious sect against the wishes of their parents?
4	4	"The Selling of the Stars" / "A Summer of Jazz"	October 14, 1978	2504
"The Selling of the Stars": Glenn on Harry Geisler, known as Harry the Bear, the teenage president of Factors Et Cetera, Inc., a company that sells celebrity-branded merchandise (produced by Patti Obrow White). "A Summer of Jazz": Aaron on teenagers studying jazz at the summer arts camp at Interlochen in Michigan (produced by Jo Ann Caplin). "What's Right?": What are the legal rights of children in custody suits?
5	5	"Move Ratings" / "A Trip to Red China"	October 21, 1978	2505
"Movie Ratings": Aaron on how a new film's MPAA rating can determine its success or failure (produced by Madeline Amgott). "A Trip to Red China": Glenn on a group of students from Darien High School in Darien, CT, who filmed their visit to the People's Republic of China with a Super 8 camera provided by 30 Minutes (produced by Patti Obrow White). "What's Right?": What are students' legal rights when they are suspended from school?
6	6	"Joy's Story" / "Cheerleaders"	November 4, 1978	2506
"Joy's Story": Aaron on the struggles of a 15-year-old drug addict (produced by Robert Rubin). "Cheerleaders": Glenn on the comeback of high-school cheerleading, including interviews with Duncanville, TX students attending a cheerleading clinic on the Southern Methodist University campus in Dallas (produced by Rubin). "What's Right?": What are your legal rights when you have not committed a crime, but the police stop you and ask to search your car?
7	7	"Teen Models" / "The Hazards of Rock"	November 11, 1978	2507
"Teen Models": Glenn on the popularity of modeling among teenage girls, including a visit to a national convention of modeling schools in New York, whose attendees are hoping to be discovered (produced by Christine Huneke). "The Hazards of Rock": Aaron on hearing loss caused by loud music (produced by Patti Obrow White). "What's Right?": Do female varsity athletes have the right to try out for male varsity contact sports teams, such as football?
8	8	"Student Strike Enders" / "The Dieter's Disease"	November 18, 1978	2508
"Student Strike Enders": Glenn on teachers' strikes and students' efforts to end them, including students at Stadium High School in Tacoma, WA, who sued to end a teachers' strike (produced by Madeline Amgott). "The Dieter's Disease": Aaron on teenagers like Katy Murphy with anorexia nervosa (produced by Christine Huneke). "What's Right?": The recent Supreme Court ruling [Ingraham v. Wright] holding that teachers can use corporal punishment to discipline students.
9	9	"Football Inuries" / "School Vandalism"	December 2, 1978	2509
"Football Injuries": Aaron on the injuries that can result from playing football (produced by Elliot Bernstein). "School Vandalism": Glenn on an antivandalism program at George Washington High School in San Francisco that resulted in a 60 percent reduction in vandalism by giving students $10,000 to pay for repairs and allowing them to spend any leftover funds however they wished (produced by Bernstein). "What's Right?": What are the legal responsibilities of teenage parents?
10	10	Repeat of September 23, 1978 episode	December 9, 1978	2502R
11	11	"Driver Education" / "Runaways"	January 6, 1979	2510
"Driver Education": Glenn on whether driver education programs really make young drivers safer (produced by Robert Rubin). "Runaways": Aaron on why kids run away from home and the resources available to help them (produced by Christine Huneke). "What's Right?": Can a principal control what is published in a school newspaper?
12	12	"Teen Parents" / "Teen Tycoons"	January 13, 1979	2511
"Teen Parents": Glenn on two couples who became parents when they were teenagers: David and Sue Mondragon and Kelly and Michelle McCormick (produced by Christine Huneke). "Teen Tycoons": Aaron on Junior Achievement, an organization that teaches kids entrepeneurship by giving them practical experience in forming and running businesses (produced by Madeline Amgott). Update on "Football Injuries," focusing on the financial risks that high-school football players take regarding injuries.
13	13	Repeat of October 7, 1978 episode	January 20, 1979	2503R
14	14	Repeat of October 14, 1978 episode	February 3, 1979	2504R
15	15	"From Harvest to Harvard" / "Surfing Back to School"	February 10, 1979	2512
"From Harvest to Harvard": Aaron on Laura Ruiz, a Mexican American woman from Mission, TX, who labored as a migrant worker with her family and then was accepted to Harvard (produced by Jo Ann Caplin). "Surfing Back to School": Glenn on the recognition of surfing as a sport in high schools, including the formation of the National Scholastic Surfing Association, which works to recognize surfing as a varsity sport to encourage young surfers to finish high school (produced by Madeline Amgott). "What's Right?": What are the laws governing wages and benefits for part-time teenage employees?
16	16	Repeat of October 21, 1978 episode	February 17, 1979	2505R
17	17	"New Expressions" / "The Racers"	March 3, 1979	2513
"New Expressions": Aaron on New Expression, a newspaper founded in 1977 with the sponsorship of Sister Ann Heintz of the nonprofit organization Youth Communication, which is produced by and for urban minority high-school students in Chicago and publishes articles relevant to their lives (produced by Patti Obrow White). "The Racers": Glenn on 17-year-old Scott Mohr, who runs a sikscreening business to fund his passion for drag racing, which he shares with his father Neil (produced by Robert Rubin). "What's Right?": Who is responsible for damages and injuries if a teenage driver has an accident in a car they do not own?
18	18	Repeat of November 4, 1978 episode	March 10, 1979	2506R
19	19	Repeat of November 11, 1978 episode	March 17, 1979	2507R
20	20	Repeat of November 18, 1978 episode	March 24, 1978	2508R
21	21	Repeat of December 2, 1978 episode	April 7, 1979	2509R
22	22	Repeat of January 6, 1979 episode	April 14, 1979	2510R
23	23	Repeat of January 13, 1979 episode	April 21, 1979	2511R
24	24	Repeat of February 10, 1979 episode	April 28, 1979	2512R
25	25	Repeat of March 1, 1979 episode	May 5, 1979	2513R
26	26	Repeat of September 16, 1978 episode	May 12, 1979	2501R

=== Season 2 (1979–80) ===
No. overall	No. in season	Title	Original release date	Prod. code
27	1	"Golden Gloves" / "Suicide"	September 15, 1979	2514
"Golden Gloves": Glenn on Jimmy McGovern of Queens, NY, a 19-year-old boxer who dropped out of school at 16 and is competing in the Golden Gloves tournament (produced by Patti Obrow White). "Suicide": Aaron on suicide among teenagers, including a visit to the San Mateo Suicide Prevention Center in San Mateo, CA, which has the highest suicide rate in the United States (produced by Madeline Amgott). "What's Right?": Why do school districts impose mandatory school busing, and is it truly mandatory?
28	2	"Motorcycle Safety" / "Nose Job"	September 22, 1979	2515
"Motorcycle Safety": Glenn on the rising rate of motorcycle deaths and injuries among teenagers, including interviews with Michael Corsini and Michael Bethke, both of whom were paralyzed as a result of motorcycle accidents, and Jon S. McKibben, an automative safety engineer who researches the causes and effects of motorcycle accidents (produced by Robert Rubin)."Nose Job": Aaron visits 15-year-old Mindy Arthur before, during, and after her rhinoplasty (produced by Madeline Amgott). "What's Right?": Should babysitters report suspected cases of child abuse? In 1980, Ed Armstrong, an engineer and officer of Abaste, a national organization for motorcycling, filed a complaint with the FCC under the fairness doctrine alleging that the "Motorcycle Safety" segment covered the issue of mandatory helmet wearing unfairly. In 1981 the FCC made a determination in favor of CBS (in 1987 the FCC abolished the fairness doctrine).
29	3	"Army Promise" / "What Price Olympic Gold?"	September 29, 1979	2516
"Army Promise": Glenn on teenagers' expectations of life in the military and the realities (produced by Robert Rubin). "What Price Olympic Gold?": Aaron on 19-year-old figure skater Linda Fratianne, who is preparing for the 1980 Winter Olympics in Lake Placid, NY (produced by Madeline Amgott). "What's Right?": What are a school's responsibilities if a student goes off-campus without permission and then is injured?
30	4	Repeat of January 6, 1979 episode	October 6, 1979	2510RR
31	5	"Who's on First?" / "Teenage Homosexuality"	October 13, 1979	2517
"Who's on First?": Glenn on Luis Ortiz and Rex Hudler, two young prospects at the New York Yankees' minor league training camp (produced by Tom Yellin). "Teenage Homosexuality": Aaron interviews five gay teenagers in Houston, who discuss how they are dealing with their homosexuality, and Dr. Steven Coleman, who treats gay teenagers (produced by Elisbeth Lawrence). "What's Right?": Do parents have to pay for college for children over 18?
32	6	"Drinking Parents" / "Medical High School"	October 20, 1979	2518
"Drinking Parents": Aaron on how kids are affected by their alcoholic parents, including interviews with members of Alateen, an organization that helps teenagers deal with the impact of someone else's alcholism (produced by Diego Echeverria). "Medical High School": Glenn on the High School for Health Professions, founded by renowned cardiologist Dr. Michael DeBakey in collaboration with Baylor College of Medicine in Houston (produced by Robert Rubin). "What's Right?": What are the legal responsibilities of camp counselors if someone is injured in an accident?
33	7	"The SAT's" / "Young, Black and Jobless"	October 27, 1979	2519
"The SAT's": Glenn on the SAT college admissions test and whether coaching for it is effective (produced by Madeline Amgott). "Young, Black and Jobless": Aaron on employment among Black youths in Memphis (produced by Tom Yellin). "What's Right?": If juveniles are suspected of having committed a crime, are they required to answer questions from the police?
34	8	"Burger Blues" / "Street Gangs"	November 3, 1979	2520
"Burger Blues": Glenn on what it is like to work at a fast-food chain restaurant (produced by Horace Jenkins). "Street Gangs": Aaron on how street gangs can provide a sense of identity and belonging for some kids, including interviews with members of the Ching-A-Ling Nomads gang in the South Bronx (produced by Catherine Olian). "What's Right?": Can a school prohibit a student from reading certain poems at a school literary festival?
35	9	"Drug Busting, Part I" / "Call of the Wild"	November 10, 1979	2521
"Drug Busting, Part I": Part I of Glenn's two-part report on the use of undercover tactics, including hidden cameras and student informants, to combat drug use at Lake Central High School in St. John, IN (produced by Elisabeth Lawrence). "Call of the Wild": Aaron on the lessons learned by seven 14-year-old boys who spent the summer in the Utah wilderness in a program organized by the National Outdoor Leadership School (produced by Tom Yellin). "What's Right?": What is the legal authority that gives a school the right to use undercover tactics, such as hidden cameras and informants?
36	10	"Drug Busting, Part II" / "Juilliard"	November, 17, 1979	2522
"Drug Busting, Part II": Part II of Glenn's two-part report (produced by Elisabeth Lawrence). "Juilliard": Aaron on teenagers studying classical music in a precollege program at the Juilliard School, a prestigious performing arts school in New York (produced by Catherine Olian). "What's Right?": What legal guidelines are the police required to follow when they come to a school for a search?
37	11	"Magnificent 13" / "A View from Abroad"	December 1, 1979	2523
"Magnificent 13": Glenn on the Magnificent 13, a group of young people who patrol the Bronx and the New York subways to deter crime, which was formed by Curtis Sliwa in 1977 and became the Guardian Angels in 1979 and which is regarded by critics as a vigilante group (produced by Diego Echeverria). "A View from Abroad": Aaron visits Paris to speak with three European teenagers, from France, Italy, and the Netherlands, about growing up in Europe and whether they think they are different from their American counterparts (produced by Michelle Kay). "What's Right?": How will the recent Supreme Court ruling [Smith v. Daily Mail Publishing Co.] that permits newspapers to publish the names of juvenile offenders affect juveniles?
38	12	Repeat of September 15, 1979 episode	December 15, 1979	2514R
39	13	"Legacy of Hate" / "Brothers and Sisters"	January 5, 1980	2524
"Legacy of Hate": Glenn on the psychological and emotional effects on teenagers of the long-running conflict in Northern Ireland (produced by Madeline Amgott). "Brothers and Sisters": Aaron on the growing popularity of fraternities and sororities, including interviews with students at the University of Alabama in Tuscaloosa (produced by Diego Echeverria). "What's Right?": What happens to you if your parents die?
40	14	"Rolling for Dollars" / "Shoplifting"	January 12, 1980	2525
"Rolling for Dollars": Glenn on the roller skating fad, focusing on the popularity of roller disco (produced by Robert Rubin). "Shoplifting": Aaron on the motivations for and consequences of teenage shoplifting (produced by Elisabeth Lawrence). "What's Right?": Can a coach suspend a basketball player from the team if he is arrested for disorderly conduct?
41	15	Repeat of September 22, 1979 episode	January 19, 1980	2515R
42	16	"Marching Bands" / "Teens Looking at Themselves"	January 26, 1980	2526
"Marching Bands": Glenn on the transformation of high-school marching bands, like one in Travelers Rest, SC, into fiercely competitve organizations (produced by Robert Rubin). "Teens Looking at Themselves": Aaron on a course developed by teacher Susan Spina at Smithtown High School East in St. James, NY, in which teenagers study other teenagers from an ethnographical perspective (produced by Virginia Gray and Vern Diamond). "What's Right?": How are a part-time restaurant employee's salary and tips taxed?
43	17	Repeat of February 29, 1979 episode	February 2, 1980	2516R
44	18	"The Young Refugees" / "Teen Medicine"	February 9, 1980	2527
"The Young Refugees": Glenn on the difficulties of young Southeast Asian refugees who have resettled in the United States, including those at Classen High School in Oklahoma City, where 7,000 Southeast Asian refugees have relocated since the end of the Vietnam War in 1975 (produced by Diego Echeverria). "Teen Medicine": Aaron on health services specifically for teenagers, including a clinic for adolescents at Long Island Jewish Hospital in Great Neck, NY, where teenagers can get confidential treatment for sensitive issues, and a hotline run by teenagers for teenagers operated by the Milwaukee Planned Parenthood Association (produced by Susan Mills). "What's Right?": How do you get out of a record club agreement that requires you to purchase a certain number of records a year?
45	19	Repeat of October 13, 1979 episode	February 16, 1980	2517R
46	20	"Teen Medics" / "Kids in Politics"	February 23, 1980	2528
"Teen Medics": Glenn on an innovative emergency medical service called Explorer Post 53 run by high-school medics in Darien, CT (produced by Susan Mills). "Kids in Politics": Aaron on young people participating in the January 1980 Iowa caucuses, including 18-year-old Phil Cavanaugh, a supporter of President Ronald Reagan, and high-school senior Janet Hess, a supporter of Senator Edward Kennedy (produced by Madeline Amgott). "What's Right?": Are adoptees entitled to obtain information about their biological parents?
47	21	"The Hitchhikers" / "Kids in College"	March 1, 1980	2529
"The Hitchhikers": Glenn on the risks of hitchhiking (produced by Elisabeth Lawrence). "Kids in College": Aaron on kids 15 and under enrolled as full-time students in a special early-entrance program at the University of Washington (produced by Catherine Olian). "What's Right?": Why are some states moving the legal drinking age from 18 back to 19, 20, or 21?
48	22	Too Late for Me	March 8, 1980	2530
Excerpts from a 31-minute narrative film about gang violence produced by the mostly Latino students in the film, television, and radio program at Roberto Clemente High School in Chicago. "The Movie Makers": Aaron speaks with some of the students who made Too Late for Me, including actors Oscar Monterrubio and John Savage, actor and editor Eric David, writer and cinematographer Aldo R. Gandia, and film teacher John C. West. "What's Right?": What are the legal responsibilities of babysitters? Although this episode is no longer readily available, the film can be viewed in its entirety on the Media Burn website.
49	23	"Women in Sports" / "Roadies"	March 15, 1980	2531
"Women in Sports": Aaron on the efforts to secure the equal treatment of women in college sports since the passage of Title IX in 1972, including interviews with Janet Davis, a basketball player at Alta Loma High School in Rancho Cucamonga, CA, who has received numerous college athletic scholarship offers, and college basketball players Judy LeWinter of San José State University, Karen Fox of New Mexico State University, and Nancy Lieberman of Old Dominion University (produced by Madeline Amgott). "Roadies": Glenn on the life of the roadies who travel with touring rock groups, including New York teenager Jamie Bocciagallupo, who is not a roadie but is assisting three of them at the start of The Police's first world tour (produced by Robert Rubin). "What's Right?": Does a potential employer have the right to see your high-school records without your permission?
50	24	"Draft" / "Blue Jeans"	March 22, 1980	2532
"Draft": Aaron on President Jimmy Carter's proposal to revive registration for the miltary draft, in response to the Iran hostage crisis that began in 1979, and the reactions of young people at the University of California, Berkeley (produced by Virginia Gray and Susan Mills). "Blue Jeans": Glenn on the designer jeans fad (produced by Catherine Olian). "What's Right?": If you buy a radio that you suspect to be stolen and then it turns out to be stolen, are you liable?
51	25	"Teen Parents" / "Death and Dying"	March 29, 1980	2533
"Teen Parents": Repeat of January 13, 1979 segment. "Death and Dying": Aaron on a course on death and dying conceived by Rev. William Wendt at the School Without Walls, an experimental high school in Washington, DC, and plans to offer such courses at all public high schools in the district (produced by Martin Smith). "What's Right?": Why are persons under 18 who have committed crimes increasingly standing trial as adults?
52	26	Repeat of October 20, 1979 episode	April 5, 1980	2518R
53	27	Repeat of October 27, 1979 episode	April 12, 1980	2519R
54	28	Repeat of November 3, 1979 episode	April 19, 1980	2520R
55	29	Repeat of November 10, 1979 episode	May 3, 1980	2521R
56	30	Repeat of November 17, 1979 episode	May 10, 1980	2522R
57	31	Repeat of December 1, 1979 episode	May 17, 1980	2523R
58	32	Repeat of January 5, 1980 episode	May 24, 1980	2524R
59	33	Repeat of January 12, 1980 episode	May 31, 1980	2525R
60	34	Repeat of January 26, 1980 episode	June 7, 1980	2526R
61	35	Repeat of February 9, 1980 episode	June 14, 1980	2527R
62	36	Repeat of February 23, 1980 episode	June 21, 1980	2528R
63	37	Repeat of March 1, 1980 episode	June 28, 1980	2529R
64	38	Repeat of March 8, 1980 episode	July 5, 1980	2530R
65	39	Repeat of March 15, 1980 episode	July 12, 1980	2531R
66	40	Repeat of March 22, 1980 episode	July 19, 1980	2532R
67	41	Repeat of March 29, 1980 episode	July 26, 1980	2533R

=== Season 3 (1980–81) ===
No. overall	No. in season	Title	Original release date	Prod. code
68	1	"Ku Klux Klan" / "Karen Rogers"	September 20, 1980	2534
"Ku Klux Klan": Glenn on the Klan Youth Corps, a division of the Ku Klux Klan, a white supremacist group, that recruits, indoctrinates, and trains kids ages 10 to 17 (produced by Catherine Olian). "Karen Rogers": Bowser on 17-year-old Karen Rogers, the leading female jockey in the United States (produced by Madeline Amgott). "Letters."
69	2	"Amigos" / "The Desser Family"	September 27, 1980	2535
"Amigos": Glenn visits Honduras to observe the young volunteers of Amigos de las Américas, a nonprofit organization that works with impoverished communities in Latin America (produced by Susan Mills). "The Desser Family": Bowser visits a family in Grand Rapids, MI with 16 children (produced by Patti Obrow White). "Letters."
70	3	"Diet Camp" / "Gospel Gold"	October 4, 1980	2536
"Diet Camp": Bowser on Camp Shane in Ferndale, NY, a weight-loss camp for overweight teenagers (produced by Martin Smith). "Gospel Gold": Glenn on The Mighty Supreme Voices, a Black gospel group from Dallas consisting of 19-year-old Cecil Washington and several family members (produced by Robert Rubin). "Letters."
71	4	"Handicapped Teens" / "Hartford Theatre"	October 11, 1980	2537
"Handicapped Teens": Glenn meets Paul Graham of Scituate, RI and Annie Glavon of Bellingham, MA, two teenagers who each lost a leg to bone cancer, and discusses how they have learned to cope (produced by Catherine Olian). "Hartford Theatre": Bowser on the Hartford Stage's Summer Youth Theatre, as a group of inner-city kids prepares a production of the musical, On the Town (produced by Susan Mills). "Letters."
72	5	"OceanQuest" / "The Magic Man"	October 18, 1980	2538
"OceanQuest": Bowser on a program established VisionQuest, an organization that works with at-risk youths, in which 17 juvenile offenders are offered an alternative to institutionalization by completing a 10-day journey around Lake Ontario as assistants to the crew of the sailing ship Pathfinder (produced by Patti Obrow White). "The Magic Man": Glenn on 19-year-old magician Russell Feig (produced by Robert Rubin). "Letters."
73	6	"The Embassy Teens" / "On the Farm"	October 25, 1980	2539
"The Embassy Teens": Bowser speaks with Julie and Susan Petterson, the two teenage daughters of Donald Petterson, US Ambassador to Somalia, on living at the US Embassy in Mogadishu in the aftermath of the 1979 takeover of the US Embassy in Tehran, Iran (produced by Patti Obrow White). "On the Farm": Glenn visits the Farm in Tennessee, the largest commune in the United States, cofounded by spiritual leader Steve Gaskin in 1970, of which 500 out of its 1,300 members are under 18 (produced by Martin Smith). "Letters."
74	7	"Off the Streets at 9" / "Racing to the Olympics"	November 8, 1980	2540
"Off the Streets at 9": Bowser visits Bordentown, NJ, which has imposed a controversial 9 p.m. curfew for persons under 18 to combat crime (produced by Susan Mills). "Racing to the Olympics": Glenn speaks with Sarah Rengal and Lori Bloam, two alpine skiers hoping to compete at the Winter Olympics (produced by Robert Rubin). "Letters."
75	8	"College Shock" / "Getting into College"	November 15, 1980	2541
"College Shock": Glenn speaks with first-year students at the University of Michigan, who discuss whether they were academically prepared for college (produced by Madeline Amgott). "Getting into College": Bowser interviews Richard Moll, dean of admissions at the University of California, Santa Cruz, and author of Playing the Private College Admissions Game (1979), who offers advice on applying to college (produced by Joel Heller). "Letters."
76	9	"Nico-Teen" / "Football, Faith & Faust"	November 22, 1980	2542
"Nico-Teen": Bowser on teenage smoking and antismoking programs, including one at Redwood Junior High School in Saratoga, CA (produced by Gail Sikevitz). "Football, Faith & Faust": Glenn on Gerry Faust, football coach at Archbishop Moeller High School, a Catholic high school in Cincinnati, who leads a successful football program that combines athletic practice and prayer (produced by Catherine Olian). "Letters."
77	10	Repeat of September 20, 1980 episode	November 29, 1980	2534R
78	11	Repeat of September 27, 1980 episode	December 6, 1980	2535R
79	12	Repeat of October 4, 1980 episode	December 20, 1980	2536R
80	13	"Inside The White Shadow" / "Battered Teens	January 10, 1981	2543
"Inside The White Shadow": Bowser on the hit CBS drama series, The White Shadow, including interviews with actors Ken Howard, Thomas Carter, and Timothy Van Patten, writers Joshua Brand and John Falsey, producer Mark Tinker, and executive producer Bruce Paltrow (produced by Patti Obrow White). "Battered Teens": Glenn on teenagers physically abused by their parents, including 16-year-old Lisa Hutchinson of Biloxi, MS, who has been getting help from Neil Brennecke and Jeanine Atkinson at Parents Anonymous (produced by Susan Mills). "Letters."
81	14	"High School Ministry" / "The Indian School"	January 24, 1981	2544
"High School Ministry": Glenn on the high-school ministry program of the Campus Crusade for Christ (produced by Martin Smith). "The Indian School": Bowser on the problems of government-run boarding schools for Native Americans, including the Sherman Indian High School in Riverside, CA, which enrolls students from 45 tribes, including students from the Hopi Reservation in Arizona 400 miles away (produced by Catherine Olian). "Letters."
82	15	Repeat of October 11, 1980 episode	January 31, 1981	2537R
83	16	"Sex Education" / "Faith Healer"	February 7, 1981	2545
"Sex Education": Glenn on the controversy over sex education courses that focus solely on the biology of reproduction and those that are more comprehensive (produced by Carolyn Kresky). "Faith Healer": Bowser speaks with "Little" Michael Lord, a 13-year-old faith healer from Columbus, GA (produced by Robert Rubin). "Letters."
84	17	"Dancers" / "Mind Your Manners"	February 14, 1981	2546
"Dancers": Glenn on teenage members of the American Ballet Theatre's repertory company rehearsing for their fall tour in August 1980 and then performing along Florida's Gulf Coast in November 1980 (produced by Martin Smith). "Mind Your Manners": Bowser on etiquette courses for teenagers, including an interview with Walter Hoving, author of Tiffany's Table Manners for Teenagers (1961), who teaches a course at the luxury store Tiffany's in New York (produced by Susan Mills). "Letters."
85	18	Repeat of October 18, 1980 episode	February 21, 1981	2538R
86	19	"Women at Sea" / "How to Survive Teenagers"	February 28, 1981	2547
"Women at Sea": Glenn on the US Navy's Women at Sea program, created after women were first allowed to serve on noncombat support ships in 1978 (produced by Catherine Olian). "How to Survive Teenagers": Bowser on a course that teaches parents and teenagers how to get along with each other, developed by educator Eleanor M. Saris and psychotherapist Peter H. Buntman, based on their book, How to Live with Your Teenager: A Survivor's Handbook for Parents (1979) (produced by Madeline Amgott). "Letters."
87	20	"Music or Mayhem" / "Bobby's Choice"	March 7, 1981	2548
"Music or Mayhem": Bowser on the difficulties faced by concert promoters, arena managers, and musicians in controlling crowds at rock concerts after 11 young fans were trampled to death while rushing for first-come, first-served seating before The Who concert at Cincinnati's Riverfront Coliseum on December 3, 1979 (produced by Martin Smith). "Bobby's Choice": Glenn on high-school hockey player Bobby Carpenter, who is deciding whether to sign with the NHL for a lucrative contract or attend college and train for the 1984 Winter Olympics (produced by Robert Rubin). "Letters."
88	21	"Growing Up in the Middle East"	March 14, 1981	2549
Glenn and Bowser travel to Israel to speak with Israeli Jewish and Arab Muslim kids about growing up amidst the persistent violence in the Middle East (produced by Madeline Amgott).
89	22	"The Art of Graffiti?" / "Coming Out"	March 21, 1981	2550
"The Art of Graffiti?": Bowser speaks with New York graffiti artists Futura 2000 (Lenny McGurr) and ALI (Marc André Edmonds) from the collective Soul Artists, Reese Stone of the New York City Transit Authority, graphic artist Ed Benguiat of the School of Visual Arts, and Stefan Eins of the art gallery Fashion Moda about whether graffiti is art or vandalism (produced by Susan Mills). "Coming Out": Glenn on the world of Black debutantes like TroyLynne Marie Perrault of the Young Men Illinois Club in New Orleans (produced by Catherine Olian). "Letters."
90	23	"High School Leaders Look at Their Future"	March 28, 1981	2551
Glenn and Bowser visit a seminar on the Columbia University campus in New York, where 3,000 high-school journalists from across the United States are honing their skills, and they ask them to respond to questions from a survey prepared by 30 Minutes and the CBS News Survey Unit on the views of young people on a variety of issues (produced by Patti Obrow White).
91	24	VD: Less an Illness Than an Attitude	April 4, 1981	2552
A documentary film produced by students from Roberto Clemente High School in Chicago, who examine the facts and myths surrounding sexually transmitted diseases, created at the invitation of Joel Heller, the executive producer of 30 Minutes and funded in part by CBS.
92	25	Repeat of October 25, 1980 episode	April 11, 1981	2539R
93	26	Repeat of November 8, 1980 episode	April 18, 1981	2540R
94	27	Repeat of November 15, 1980 episode	April 25, 1981	2541R
95	28	Repeat of November 22, 1980 episode	May 2, 1981	2542R
96	29	Repeat of January 10, 1981 episode	May 9, 1981	2543R
97	30	Repeat of January 24, 1981 episode	May 16, 1981	2544R
98	31	Repeat of February 7, 1981 episode	May 23, 1981	2545R
99	32	Repeat of February 14, 1981 episode	May 30, 1981	2546R
100	33	Repeat of February 28, 1981 episode	June 6, 1981	2547R
101	34	Repeat of March 7, 1981 episode	June 13, 1981	2548R
102	35	Repeat of March 14, 1981 episode	June 20, 1981	2549R
103	36	Repeat of March 21, 1981 episode	June 27, 1981	2550R
104	37	Repeat of March 28, 1981 episode	July 4, 1981	2551R
105	38	Repeat of April 4, 1981 episode	July 11, 1981	2552R
106	39	Repeat of September 20, 1980 episode	July 18, 1981	2534R
107	40	Repeat of September 27, 1980 episode	July 25, 1981	2535R
108	41	Repeat of October 4, 1980 episode	August 1, 1981	2536R
109	42	Repeat of October 11, 1980 episode	August 8, 1981	2537R
110	43	Repeat of October 18, 1980 episode	August 15, 1980	2538R
111	44	Repeat of October 25, 1980 episode	August 22, 1981	2539R
112	45	Repeat of November 8, 1980 episode	August 29, 1981	2540R

=== Season 4 (1981–82) ===
No. overall	No. in season	Title	Original release date	Prod. code
113	1	"The Other Tragedy of Atlanta" / "Helmet Safety"	September 19, 1981	2553
"The Other Tragedy of Atlanta": Bowser on how the serial killings of 28 Black youths in Atlanta from 1979 to 1981 have affected a generation of children, including comments from students and Dr. Alfred Messer, a psychiatrist who worked with investigators (produced by Jo Ann Caplin). "Helmet Safety": Glenn on the controversy over laws requiring motorcyclists to wear helmets, including comments from Patrick Simmons of The Doobie Brothers, who opposes such laws; Jon S. McKibben, an automotive safety engineer; and Danese Malkmus of Rancho Los Amigos National Rehabilitation Center in Downey, CA, a speech and language therapist who works with patients with traumatic head injuries (produced by Robert Rubin). "What It Takes": Actor Richard Thomas on the acting profession (produced by Virginia Gray).
114	2	"A Day at the Races" / "Teen Tutors"	September 26, 1981	2554
"A Day at the Races": Bowser speaks with teenage compulsive gamblers in Philadelphia and psychiatrist Dr. Robert Custer, who treats gambling addiction (produced by John Block). "Teen Tutors": Glenn on students at Mountain View High School in Mesa, AZ who tutor their peers (produced by Patti Obrow White). "What It Takes": New York Times architecture critic Paul Goldberger on being a reporter (produced by Virginia Gray).
115	3	"Video Games" / "Back to High School"	October 3, 1981	2555
"Video Games": Glenn speaks with Bill Herman, owner of Mother's Pinball Arcade in Mount Prospect, IL, and his teenage customers to understand the appeal of video games since the 1978 launch of Space Invaders and attends a town meeting in Irvington, NY, where parents are trying to restrict the popular pastime (produced by Catherine Olian). "Back to High School": Bowser speaks with 26-year-old David Owen, who impersonated a 17-year-old student to research his book High School: Undercover with the Class of '80 (1981) (produced by Susan Mills). "What It Takes": Veterinarian Dr. Lyn Comans discusses her profession (produced by Virginia Gray).
116	4	"Mackenzie Phillips" / "Creationism"	October 17, 1981	2556
"Mackenzie Phillips": Bowser speaks with the actress from the hit CBS sitcom One Day at a Time about her struggle with drug abuse (produced by Susan Mills). "Creationism": Glenn on creationism, the biblical theory of the origin of life that some schools are teaching alongside evolution, including interviews with Dr. Niles Eldredge, a paleontologist from the American Museum of Natural History, and Dr. Walter Brown, a former engineer from the Institute for Creation Research (produced by Martin Smith). "What It Takes": New York police officer Wilma Jackson discusses her profession (produced by Virginia Gray).
117	5	"Daytop vs. Delinquincy" / "Body Building"	October 24, 1981	2557
"Daytop vs. Delinquency": Bowser on an experimental program at Daytop Village in Millbrook, NY, where 70 kids live apart from their families as they work to resolve behavioral problems stemming from their relationships with their parents, including comments from assistant director Frank Scotter (produced by Robert Rubin). "Body Building": The rising popularity of bodybuilding among teenagers, including interviews with brothers Len Lychas and David Lychas, bodybuilders in Brooklyn, NY; their trainer Julian Levine of R&J Health Studio, who coached bodybuilder and actor Lou Ferrigno; and exercise physiologist Dr. Frank Catcher (produced by John Block). "What It Takes": Attorney Colleen McMahon discusses the legal profession (produced by Virginia Gray).
118	6	"The C's" / "See-Minus"	October 31, 1981	2558
"The C's": Glenn on the California Conservation Corps, a youth workforce development program founded in 1976 whose members work on environmental projects and respond to disasters (produced by Patti Obrow White). "See-Minus": Bowser speaks with visually impaired teenagers to understand how they cope (produced by Vern Diamond). "What It Takes": Robert Moehl of Doyle Dane Bernbach Inc. discusses the advertising profession (produced by Nancy M. Dutty).
119	7	Repeat of September 19, 1981 episode	November 7, 1981	2553R
120	8	Repeat of September 26, 1981 episode	November 14, 1981	2554R
121	9	Repeat of October 3, 1981 episode	November 21, 1981	2555R
122	10	Repeat of October 17, 1981 episode	November 28, 1981	2556R
123	11	"Soap Addicts" / "OK Theater"	December 5, 1981	2559
"Soap Addicts": Bowser on why some teenagers are obsessed with daytime dramas, including interviews with students at Rutgers University, 19-year-old actress Genie Francis, who plays Laura on General Hospital; 17-year-old actress Jennifer Cooke, who plays Morgan on Guiding Light; Douglas Marland, writer for Guiding Light; and psychologist Dr. Kenneth Hahn, who studies teenage soap audiences (produced by Carolyn Kresky). "OK Theater": Glenn on the Ordinary Kids / Adolescent Community Theater (OK Theater), a multiracial improvisational theater group for teenagers on Long Island that produces skits about the problems they face, including comments from founder and director Barbara Schwartz, a social worker in the Great Neck, NY public school district (produced by Michael Joseloff). "What It Takes": Airline pilot John Jersild of Transamerica Airlines discusses his profession (produced by Nancy M. Dutty).
124	12	"Aerobatics" / "Mangione in Concert" / "Jack the Dog"	January 23, 1982	2560
"Aerobatics": Repeat of an October 2, 1979 Razzmatazz report, with Glenn on teenage stunt pilot Jane Helton (produced by Catherine Olian). "Mangione in Concert": Bowser on musician and composer Chuck Mangione, who organized a backup orchestra of 70 high-school musicians for a concert at Constitution Hall in Washington, DC on March 28, 1981. "Jack the Dog": Repeat of a February 5, 1978 Razzmatazz report, with Glenn on a six-year-old fox terrier who appears in television commercials.
125	13	"Animal Medicine" / "High School Rodeo" / "Marching Bands"	January 30, 1982	2561
"Animal Medicine": Bowser visits the New Bolton Center Hospital at the University of Pennsylvania's School of Veterinary Medicine, which treats large animals like horses and cows and specializes in surgery (produced by Catherine Olian). "High School Rodeo": Glenn profiles Bobby and Brad Harris, Wyoming's 1981 team roping champions (produced by Robert Rubin). "Marching Bands": Repeat of January 26, 1980 segment.
126	14	"Insect Zoo" / "Girl Quarterback" / "Chimney Sweeps" / "Canine Frisbees"	February 6, 1982	2562
"Insect Zoo": Repeat of a January 28, 1978 Razzmatazz report, with Glenn on 15-year-old John Salisbury, who has turned a corner of his bedroom into an insect zoo, including an interview with his advisor, entomologist Lynda Richards of the Live Insect Zoo at the Smithsonian Institution in Washington, DC (produced by Judith Hole). "Girl Quarterback": Bowser on 14-year-old quarterback Tami Maida, the only female member of the junior varsity football team at Philomath High School in Philomath, OR (produced by Michael Joseloff). "Chimney Sweep": Repeat of a February 5, 1980 Razzmatazz segment, with Glenn on Williamsburg, MA chimney sweep Ken Hinkley, who often works with his 14-year-old daughter, Becky (produced by Virginia Gray). "Canine Frisbees": Repeat of a January 28, 1978 Razzmatazz segment, with Bowser on the dogs competing for the World Frisbee Championship at the Rose Bowl in Pasadena, CA.
127	15	"Sled Dogs" / "Grand Prix Jumper" / "Maritime High School" / "Hula Hoops"	February 13, 1982	2563
"Sled Dogs": Repeat of a May 1, 1979 Razzmatazz segment, with Bowser on Long Island teenager Thomas Buoniello, who raises Siberian and Alaskan huskies with his family (produced by Catherine Olian). "Grand Prix Jumper": Glenn on equestrian William Martin and his horse, Hole-In-One (produced by Robert Rubin). "Maritime High School": Repeat of a February 25, 1978 Razzmatazz segment, with Bowser on the Food and Maritime Trades High School, a New York school where students preparing for maritime careers take some of their classes on the boat SS John W. Brown, including comments from teacher Van Loo and student Sherwood Herben (produced by Viriginia Gray). "Hula Hoops": Repeat of a February 25, 1978 Razzmatazz segment, with Glenn on the 1977 National Hula Hoop Finals held at Six Flags Over Georgia (produced by Patti Obrow White).
128	16	"Sail Plane" / "Helen's Search" / "Steamtown USA"	February 20, 1982	2564
"Sail Plane": Repeat of an April 13, 1978 Razzmatazz segment, with Glenn on 17-year-old Vicky Barrett, who pilots a sailplane glider at the Skylark Glider Port in California (produced by Patti Obrow White). "Helen's Search": Bowser on 19-year-old adoptee Helen Bird, who is searching for her biological mother (produced by Jo Ann Caplin). "Steamtown USA": Repeat of a February 1, 1979 Razzmatazz segment, with Glenn on 17-year-old Mary Ann Gilman, an apprentice engineer who pilots steam engine locomotives (produced by Virginia Gray).
129	17	"Clowns" / "High School Marriages" / "Junior Firemen"	February 27, 1982	2565
"Clowns": Repeat of a June 7, 1979 Razzmatazz segment, with Bowser on becoming a circus clown, including comments from Jeff Staroff and Paul Cohen at a circus in Vero Beach, FL (produced by Vern Diamond). "High School Marriages": Glenn on the family dynamics course offered at a high school in Cortland, NY, where students pretend to be married to learn what real marriage is like (produced by Madeline Amgott). "Junior Firemen": Repeat of an April 5, 1979 Razzmatazz segment, with Bowser on the teenage members of the Harrington Park, NJ volunteer fire department (produced by Vern Diamond).
130	18	"Rolling for Dollars" / "The Missing 'R'" / "Fireworks"	March 6, 1982	2566
"Rolling for Dollars": Repeat of January 12, 1980 segment. "The Missing 'R'": Bowser visits programs helping teenagers who cannot read, including Fortune Society, Literacy Volunteers, and a US Army program (produced by Richard Purow). "Fireworks": Repeat of a May 6, 1980 Razzmatazz segment, with Glenn on New York's Pyrotechnics Products, Inc., the largest manufacturer of professional display fireworks in the United States (produced by Catherine Olian).
131	19	"Danielle Brisebois" / "School Closings" / "Cheerleaders"	March 27, 1982	2567
"Danielle Brisebois": Bowser on the 12-year-old actress who plays Stephanie Mills on Archie Bunker's Place (produced by Roz Karson). "School Closings": Glenn on school districts in Alpena, MI and Taylor, MI that have been forced to temporarily shut down due to severe financial crises (produced by Carolyn Kresky). "Cheerleaders": Repeat of November 4, 1978 segment.
132	20	"Drag Racer" / "Rainbow Company" / "Windmills"	April 3, 1982	2568
"Drag Racer": Repeat of March 3, 1979 segment. "Rainbow Company": Bowser on the Rainbow Company, a youth theater company founded in Las Vegas in 1976, including interviews with director Jody Johnston (daughter of performer Totie Fields) and choreographer Katherine McKinney as they rehearse a performance of Brian Kral's play Odd Man Out, whose cast includes several disabled children (produced by Patti Obrow White). "Windmills": Repeat of an October 2, 1979 Razzmatazz segment, with Glenn on a wind generator supplying electricity for Dorney Park, an amusement park near Allentown, PA (produced by Vern Diamond).
133	21	"Rock 'n' Roll Roadie" / "Phillips Exeter / "Field Day"	April 10, 1982	2569
"Rock 'n' Roll Roadie": Repeat of March 15, 1980 segment originally titled "Roadies." "Phillips Exeter": Glenn visits the exclusive New Hampshire boarding school, including interviews with Principal Stephen G. Kurtz, Dean of Faculty Stephen Smith, teachers, and students (produced by Patti Obrow White). "Field Day": Repeat of a December 24, 1977 Razzmatazz segment, with Bowser on the day each year when amateur radio operators move their stations outdoors, trying to make as many contacts as possible during a 24-hour-period (produced by Ken Baldwin).
134	22	"Video Games" / "Life After Tennis" / "Penguins"	April 17, 1982	2570
"Video Games": Repeat of October 3, 1981 segment. "Life After Tennis": Bowser follows up with Ilyse Wilpon, a promising 12-year-old tennis player when CBS News correspondent Charles Osgood interviewed her in 1976, to ask why she decided to stop competing at 18 (produced by Patti Obrow White). "Penguins": Repeat of a September 2, 1980 Razzmatazz segment, with Glenn on the penguin colony at the Hubbs-SeaWorld Research Institute in San Diego, where curator Frank Todd brought the first individuals in 1975 (produced by Vern Diamond).
135	23	"Dancers" / "On Their Own" / "Horse Stable School"	April 24, 1982	2571
"Dancers": Repeat of February 14, 1981 segment. "On Their Own": Glenn on minor emancipation laws, including an interview with Connecticut teenager Rosanne Demanski, who obtained a court order to be emancipated from her parents, and Ronald Gold, an attorney with Legal Aid who participated in drafting the state's law (produced by Jo Ann Caplin). "Horse Stable School": Repeat of a May 11, 1978 Razzmatazz segment, with Bowser on a Long Island vocational school's course on the care of horses (produced by Virginia Gray).
136	24	"Diet Camp" / "Children of Divorce" / "Brushing Teeth"	May 8, 1982	2572
"Diet Camp": Repeat of October 4, 1980 segment. "Children of Divorce": Bowser on a filmed group session featuring students at Lexington High School in Lexington, MA sharing their feelings about their parents' divorces, led by guidance counselor Howard Scofield (produced by Nancy Baer). "Brushing Teeth": Repeat of a May 11, 1978 Razzmatazz segment, with Glenn on students participating in No Plaque Shack, a voluntary dental hygiene program at East Juniata High School in Cocolamus, PA (produced by Virginia Gray).
137	25	"See-Minus" / "Matador" / "Chinatown Photographers"	May 15, 1982	2573
"See-Minus": Repeat of October 31, 1981 segment. "Matador": Glenn on 19-year-old David Renk of Texas, the youngest matador in American history (produced by Susan Mills). "Chinatown Photographers": Repeat of a May 11, 1978 Razzmatazz segment, with Bowser on fourth-grade students who took a field trip to photograph New York's Chinatown with photographer Hilda Bijur (produced by Virginia Gray).
138	26	"Body Building" / "Isle of Youth" / "Monique"	May 22, 1982	2574
"Body Building": Repeat of October 24, 1981 segment. "Isle of Youth": Glenn on Isla de la Juventud, a Cuban island where the government has established numerous boarding schools for foreign students from developing countries in Latin America, Africa, and elsewhere, where they study regular subjects and Marxist political ideology and also work in the fields (produced by Patti Obrow White). "Monique": Repeat of a December 24, 1977 Razzmatazz segment, on Monique Hagopian, a girl who wrote a letter to the editor published in the New York Times on May 7, 1977, when she was 13, explaining why she has not watched television for five years (produced by White).
139	27	Repeat of January 23, 1982 episode	May 29, 1982	2575
140	28	Repeat of January 30, 1982 segments: "Animal Medicine" and "High School Rodeo." Repeat of January 26, 1980 segment: "Marching Band"	June 5, 1982	2576
141	29	Repeat of February 6, 1982 episode	June 12, 1982	2577
142	30	Repeat of February 13, 1982 episode	June 19, 1982	2578
143	31	Repeat of February 20, 1982 episode	June 26, 1982	2579
144	32	Repeat of February 27, 1982 episode	July 3, 1982	2580
145	33	Repeat of January 12, 1980 segment: "Rolling for Dollars. Repeat of March 6, 1982 segment: "The Missing 'R.'" Repeat of March 6, 1982 segment: "Fireworks"	July, 10, 1982	2581
146	34	Repeat of March 27, 1982 segments: "Danielle Brisebois" and "School Closings." Repeat of November 4, 1978 segment: "Cheerleaders"	July 17, 1982	2567R
147	35	Repeat of March 3, 1979 segment: "Drag Racer." Repeat of April 3, 1982 segments: "Rainbow Company" and "Windmills"	July 24, 1982	2568R
148	36	Repeat of April 10, 1982 episode	July 31, 1982	2569R
149	37	Repeat of October 3, 1981 segment: "Video Games." Repeat of April 17, 1982 segments: "Life After Tennis" and "Penguins"	August 7, 1982	2570R
150	38	Repeat of February 14, 1981: "Dancers." Repeat of April 24, 1982 segments: "On Their Own" and "Horse Stable School"	August 14, 1982	2571R
151	39	Repeat of October 4, 1980 segment: "Diet Camp." Repeat of May 8, 1982 segments: "Children of Divorce" and "Brushing Teeth"	August 21, 1982	2572R
152	40	Repeat of October 31, 1981 segment: "See Minus." Repeat of May 15, 1982 segments: "Matador" and "Chinatown Photographers"	August 28, 1982	2573R

== Production ==
30 Minutes debuted at the close of a decade that reshaped children's television, a period when ABC, CBS, and NBC expanded educational and informational programming for children in response to pressure from the advocacy group Action for Children's Television (ACT) and threats of new federal regulation. In 1968, Peggy Charren and a group of her friends cofounded ACT to improve children's television, which they regarded as an overly commercialized wasteland. In 1970 ACT petitioned the Federal Communications Commission (FCC) to issue new rules. The FCC declined, but in 1974 it released its "Children's Television Report and Policy Statement," in which it set forth policies and guidelines it expected broadcasters to comply with, but left compliance to industry self-regulation. Among other things, it stated that broadcasters should provide a reasonable amount of programming "designed to educate and inform—and not merely to entertain." In 1978 the FCC reestablished its Children's Task Force to assess the changes that had occurred since 1974. In 1979 this task force published a report on its findings, one of which concluded that the time devoted to educational and informational programming had remained essentially the same. Based on this finding, it concluded that broadcasters had failed to provide a reasonable amount of such programming. FCC staff determined that children's television would improve only if the FCC set mandatory rules.

In response to pressure from ACT and the threat of new FCC regulation, CBS and the other networks began expanding their educational and informational programming for children in the early 1970s, a process that accelerated through the end of the decade. The first of CBS's programs was In the Know, two-and-one-half-minute informational segments that premiered in September 1970 and aired between Saturday morning cartoons; aimed at kids 6 to 12, it was hosted by characters from the animated series Josie and the Pussycats and featured live-action films on subjects like volcanoes, watchmaking, lunar rovers, iron-ore mining, and the construction of the Eiffel Tower. Encouraged by its success, in September 1971 In the News, which Heller produced and Glenn anchored, was introduced. In a 1982 Gallup survey of 1,010 teen-agers, nearly 90 percent stated that these segments had informed them about the world when they were younger and nearly half declared that they were a major source of information about current events. That same month CBS launched You Are There, anchored by Walter Cronkite—"eyewitness" reenactments of historic events like the trial of Socrates, Paul Revere's ride, the Lewis and Clark Expedition, and the disappearance of Amelia Earhart. From 1972 to 1980, Heller produced What's It All About?, a series of 30-minute specials that explained current issues to kids, such as the 1974 U.S. Congressional and gubernatorial elections, inflation, Communism, and the Middle East. Later, CBS launched a one-hour newsmagazine for younger kids titled Razzmatazz. Developed in collaboration with Scholastic Magazines, this Emmy Award–winning program aired from 1977 to 1982. It was produced by Heller, hosted by Barry Bostwick and later Brian Tochi, and featured segments showing young people pursuing a range of interests, from competing in rodeos to serving as volunteer firefighters.

After the newsmagazine 60 Minutes became one of CBS's most successful programs, CBS News was asked to create a half-hour news program for teenagers. Jerry Golab, then vice president for children's programming, asked Heller to develop this program and to title it 30 Minutes: "That was all he said …. I asked what kind of program he was talking about. 'I don't know,' he told me. '60 Minutes is a big success—why can't you do the same thing on Saturday for the kids?'" Although 30 Minutes was inspired by 60 Minutes, it had no connection to the latter's creator, Don Hewitt, or its anchor-reporters (although some of the producers worked for 60 Minutes before or after 30 Minutes premiered). Nevertheless, Heller remarked that he hoped that it would eventually become the 60 Minutes for young people—a program he admired because it was what he described as the "ombudsman of the everyday man."

Heller stated that with this new venture, the network was "entering into uncharted waters." Importantly, the program was more expensive to make than the animated series that aired on Saturday mornings. For the first season, 13 episodes were produced, each of which had a budget of $70,000 and was repeated only once. By contrast, the typical cartoon had a budget of about $140,000 but was repeated several times. Heller appreciated the fact that CBS was willing to rely on profits from the network's entertainment programming to subsidize the losses on informational programs like 30 Minutes. But at a workshop presented by a chapter of the National Academy of Television Arts and Sciences, he emphasized that broadcasting was ultimately a business and could expend only limited funds on high-quality children's programs because both audiences and advertiser support were limited.

30 Minutes was taped at CBS Broadcast Center in New York and filmed on location. Aaron and Glenn were selected as the program's initial editors. The decision to use two accomplished CBS correspondents, rather than teenagers, was intentional. As Heller observed, "One major way we try to establish a line of honest communication with young people … is to use experienced adult journalists as on-the-air hosts. We have found that it is better to use an adult to present the broadcast rather than a young person speaking to other young people. Although youthful enthusiasm can be charming, a fourteen-year-old talking about teen problems does not ring true unless that young person is talking about his personal experiences." Nevertheless, some segments were produced by teenagers. For example, in the first season, a group of high-school students who were traveling to the People's Republic of China were equipped with 8mm sound cameras and filmed their visit. For the second season, students from Roberto Clemente High School in Chicago produced a film on gang violence and for the third season, one on sexually transmitted diseases among teenagers.

== Broadcast ==
30 Minutes premiered on CBS on Saturday, September 16, 1978, at 1:30 p.m., after the network's block of children's cartoons had concluded. It aired for the first three Saturday afternoons of each month, while the CBS Children's Film Festival was shown on the fourth Saturday. Newsweek heralded the premiere of 30 Minutes and similar programs that season as signs that children's television was finally maturing: "Has children's television finally decided to grow up? Judging from the new series and specials in kidvid's fall semester, TV's most infantile genre is displaying signs of a refreshing—if not entirely voluntary—maturity. Under the lash of governmental and consumerist protest, kidvid's manufacturers are eschewing stereotypes and downplaying violence. The emphasis remains on entertainment, but now all manner of social messages are being woven into the fun."

However, the program's time slot was challenging because most teenagers were either watching sports on television at that time or not watching television at all. As one critic commented, 30 Minutes offered a worthwhile alternative to Saturday morning's entertainment programming, but "who wants their children watching TV in the middle of a Saturday afternoon?" Contesting this perspective, Faith Frenz-Heckman, vice president of children's programs at CBS Entertainment, maintained that 30 Minutes was slotted for Saturday afternoons because more sets were in use, more older viewers were watching, and if the program had been scheduled opposite cartoons it would not have had the audience it aimed to reach.

Nevertheless, Heller believed that the program's ideal time slot would have been a weekday after school or early Saturday or Sunday evening so that parents could watch it with their children. Glenn declared: "The dream location for this show would be at 7:30 p.m. …. One evening a week, we'd reach a lot more people, and it's a logical spot. My second choice would be late afternoon, like 4:30 Thursday. The audience is greater there. But 30 Minutes is unfortunately stacked against football." Television critic David Bianculli suggested that even though the program's time slot may have limited its audience, the fact that it received comparatively little notice may have it enabled it to cover more sensitive subjects and even include occasional profanity than if it had aired in a slot where more viewers were paying attention.

In 1984, CBS sold a package of programming to China Central Television (CCTV) for broadcast in the People's Republic of China. Wang Feng, the director of CCTV, selected 64 hours of programming, including football, music, news, nature, and culture shows, "to promote understanding between the Chinese and American people." Segments from 30 Minutes were included.

== Cancellation ==
Although 30 Minutes was critically acclaimed, Its ratings were relatively low and its mixed audience of adults and children made it difficult to market to advertisers, who preferred targeting a single demographic. In 1981, Bill Leonard, then president of CBS News, intervened to save it from cancellation after the end of the third season. But in 1982 it was finally cancelled. Heller estimated that CBS would save $1 million a year by replacing the program with the CBS Children's Film Festival, which aired films that the network simply bought from distributors.

The program's cancellation also coincided with the FCC's retreat from its efforts to regulate children's television after President Ronald Reagan, whose administration championed deregulation, assumed office. Mark S. Fowler, the new FCC chairman, implemented this approach, arguing that the market, not the government, should shape television programming. During his tenure, the networks cancelled 30 Minutes and other expensive educational and informational programs.

== Reception ==
=== Ratings ===
Ratings for 30 Minutes were typically lower than ratings than for the cartoons that preceded it and the sports programs that aired opposite it. But Heller stated: "We didn't lose our audience and sometimes we did slightly better than the Children's Film Festival, which had been in our time slot before …. In that way we considered the show a ratings success—not a success compared to Bugs Bunny, but it was respectable." The chart below shows the program's ratings during the May and November sweeps periods.

Date	Average Audience (Households)	Average Audience (%)	Share of Audience (%)
November 18, 1978	2,980,000	4.0	14
May 26, 1979	N/A	N/A	N/A
November 17, 1979	3,360,000	4.4	15
May 17, 1979	3,200,000	4.2	19
November 15, 1980	3,350,000	4.3	13
May 23, 1981	2,720,000	3.5	16
November 14, 1981	2,200,000	2.7	9
May 15, 1982	2,120,000	2.6	10

=== Reviews ===
30 Minutes was universally acclaimed by critics. David Bianculli exclaimed: "If you haven't seen CBS's 30 Minutes yet, you should. Even though this pint-sized version of 60 Minutes is meant for kids, it makes for fine adult entertainment." Lee Margulies of the Los Angeles Times commented: "The longer pieces are solidly produced and should interest most teens." John J. O'Connor of the New York Times praised the program as "far above the level of most programing designed for young audiences" and singled it out for tackling difficult subjects, such as juvenile offenders treated as adults. A critic for Variety remarked: "A pint-sized '60 Minutes,' this teen-oriented news magazine is off to a responsible and interesting beginning, though it needs to find the right approach to its segments. Should there be an emphasis on investigative work? Or should the items be simply informative? The format no doubt will shake out with time. … A good effort that ought to be strengthened." The popular syndicated television columnist Gary Deeb described the program as "outstanding" and condemned CBS's decision to cancel it.

=== Awards ===
30 Minutes was nominated for an Emmy Award for Outstanding Children's Informational Series in 1979. It won Emmy Awards for Outstanding Children's Informational/Instructional Series in 1980, 1981, and 1982.

In 1978 the program received a Peabody Award. The commendation read: "In 30 Minutes, CBS News has successfully dealt with a variety of subjects, primarily of interest to teen-agers, but generally of interest to other segments of the viewing public as well. In so doing, they have produced a series of programs of real quality, programs which, in the opinion of the Peabody Board, have made significant contributions to keeping the young people of this nation informed."

In 1979 the program was honored for its "Significant Contribution" at the 7th Annual Achievement in Children's Television Awards, sponsored by ACT.

In 1980 the program received an Ohio State Award, presented by the Institute for Education by Radio-Television at Ohio State University to recognize excellence in educational, informational, and public affairs radio and television programming.

== Home media ==
30 Minutes has not been released officially on DVD. A small number of episodes are in the collection of the Paley Archive at the Beverly Hills Public Library and at the Paley Museum in New York. One episode is in the collection of the UCLA Film & Television Archive in Los Angeles. Transcripts of episodes, usually under the title CBS News Public Affairs Broadcasts, are available on microfiche in the collections of select libraries in the United States.

== Themes and analysis ==
In the 1970s, a confluence of factors paved the way for 30 Minutes. These include pressure from advocacy groups like ACT that lobbied for more educational and informational programming for children, CBS's anticipation of increased regulation from the FCC, CBS News's longstanding commitment to children's programming and its desire to replicate the success of 60 Minutes with a show aimed at teenagers, and the creative vision of executive producer Joel Heller, the coeditors, and the production team. It offered viewers rigorous reporting on issues relevant to teenagers, tackling subjects rarely covered on television for kids and providing high-quality information from an empathetic perspective to teenage viewers on sensitive subjects.

But during the program's third season, incoming FCC chairman Mark S. Fowler adopted a deregulatory approach to broadcasting. 30 Minutes and other educational and informational programs for children were cancelled one by one, largely replaced by cartoons inspired by hit television series or toys. Frustrated by this shift, ACT sued the FCC in 1982. Eventually, Congress took action and passed the Children's Television Act of 1990. Among other things, this act restricted advertising during children's programming and required broadcasters to air a minimum of three hours of educational and informational programming each week. Despite this requirement, none of the networks developed a successor to 30 Minutes. Instead, the program's effective heir was Nick News, a news program for kids hosted by journalist Linda Ellerbee that premiered on the cable network Nickelodeon in 1992, which informed a new generation of young people. 30 Minutes remains a valuable historical record of issues relevant to teenagers in the late 1970s and early 1980s.
