= Fred Graham (correspondent) =

American television news anchor

- Born: Fred Patterson Graham; October 6, 1931; Little Rock, Arkansas, U.S.
- Died: December 28, 2019 (aged 88); Washington, D.C., U.S.
- Education: Yale University; Vanderbilt University Law School; Oxford University
- Occupations: Legal correspondent, television news anchor, attorney
- Employer(s): CBS News; Court TV; The New York Times
- Spouses: Sheila Lucille McCrea (m. 1961; div. 1982) Skila Harris (m. 1982)
- Children: 3
- Awards: Peabody Award; Silver Gavel Award; Emmy Award

Fred Patterson Graham (October 6, 1931 – December 28, 2019) was an American legal affairs journalist, television news anchor, and attorney. He was the chief anchor and managing editor of the former Court TV. He also won a Peabody award for his work as a CBS law correspondent.

== Early life ==
Graham was born in Little Rock, Arkansas, the son of Otis and Lois Patterson Graham. His father was a Presbyterian minister.

He went to a two-room school in Texarkana, Arkansas where his classmate was Ross Perot. Then, the family moved to Nashville, Tennessee for his father's work. He graduated from West End High School in Nashville in 1949. He attended Yale University on an academic scholarship, receiving a B.A. in 1953. There, he was a member of the fraternity St. Anthony Hall.

Graham was in the infantry and was an intelligence officer of the United States Marine Corps from 1953 to 1956. He served in both Korea and Japan.

He then attended Vanderbilt University Law School, receiving an LL.B. in 1959. There, he became a member of the Order of the Coif and was the managing editor of the Vanderbilt Law Review.

As a Fulbright Scholar, he attended Oxford University and earned a Diploma of Law in 1960.

== Career ==
From 1960 to 1963, Graham went into private practice with the firm of Trabue, Sturdivant and Harbison in Nashville, Tennessee. In January 1963, he moved to Washington D.C. to serve as the chief counsel to the Senate Judiciary Subcommittee on Constitutional Amendments. In October 1963, he then worked as a special assistant to Secretary of Labor W. Willard Wirtz.

In February 1965, he was the first attorney hired to be a Supreme Court correspondent for The New York Times, working there until 1972. In addition to the Supreme Court, he covered the Justice Department in an era of racial tensions and violence.

He was a legal correspondent for CBS News from 1972 to 1987, covering the FBI, the Department of Justice, the Supreme Court, and the legal profession. In this capacity, he covered the Watergate scandal, President Richard M. Nixon's resignation, and abortion rights. He also had a weekly radio show, The Law and You, and was a substitute anchor for CBS Morning News, Face the Nation, and Nightwatch. He received a Peabody Award in 1974 for his coverage of Watergate.

However, as television news became film focused, his airtime was reduced because cameras were not allowed in the courtroom. In 1987, he was laid off from CBS during a period of staff reduction. Graham found a new position as a local news anchor of WKRN-TV, the ABC affiliate in Nashville, for two years. During this time he wrote Happy Talk: Confessions of a TV Newsman which was published in 1990. In this memoir of his twenty years as a broadcast journalist, he stated that network news had become “infotainment, the equivalent of a well-produced video version of a tabloid.”

In 1991, cameras were allowed in the courtroom for criminal trials. Graham was hired as the managing editor, chief anchor, and one of the first four anchors of Court TV, the nickname for the new Courtroom Television Network. Graham said, "It is unlike anything I've done before, but this is a very exciting project. It probably will become a fixture as an important part of both broadcasting and the legal scene." He is most known for his coverage of the O. J. Simpson murder case. He became Court TV's managing editor. Graham retired in 2008, when Court TV became TruTV and changed its focus.

Graham was a founding member of the Reporters Committee for Freedom of the Press. He wrote articles for magazines Esquire, Harper’s, and The New Republic, as well as the newspapers Los Angeles Times and The Washington Post.

== Awards ==
- 1974: Peabody Award
- 1974: Silver Gavel Award – Television, for his series of four reports on the U.S. Supreme court as broadcast on the CBS Evening News
- 1980: Silver Gavel Award – Radio, for the CBS Radio Network's special report, "The Supreme Court on the Air: The Pentagon Papers Case Revisited"
- 3 Emmy Awards

== Publications ==
=== Books ===
- Happy Talk: Confessions of a TV Newsman. Norton & Company, 1990. ISBN 9780393027761
- The Alias Program. Little, Brown & Co., 1976. ISBN 978-0316322980
- Press Freedom Under Pressure. The Twentieth Century Fund, 1972 ISBN 9780527027827
- The Self-Inflicted Wound. MacMillan Publishing Company. 1970. ISBN 978-0025450202
- The Due Process Revolution: The Warren Court's Impact on Criminal Law. Hayden Book Company, 1970.

=== Journals ===
- "Politics, the Constitution, and the Warren Court." with Arthur Selwyn Miller, Philip B. Kurland, and Stephen L. Wasby. Columbia Law Review. 2006; 71: 502.

== Personal life ==
He married Sheila Lucile McCrea in 1961. They had three children before divorcing in 1982. He married Skila Harris in 1982.

In 2019, he died at 88 in Washington, D.C., from complications of Parkinson’s Disease.
