= Betty Ann Bowser =

American journalist

- Born: August 19, 1944; Norfolk, Virginia, U.S.
- Died: March 16, 2018 (aged 73); Ajijic, Mexico
- Education: Granby High School; Ohio Wesleyan University
- Occupation: Journalist

Betty Ann Bowser (August 19, 1944 – March 16, 2018) was an American journalist.

== Life ==
Born in Norfolk, Virginia, Bowser graduated from Granby High School and Ohio Wesleyan University. She started in television journalism in 1966. From 1988 to 2013, she was a correspondent for PBS NewsHour.

Bowser covered Hurricane Katrina and sexual harassment in the military.

Bowser died March 16, 2018, in Ajijic, Mexico.
