= John J. O'Connor (journalist) =

American journalist (1933–2009)

- Born: John Joseph O'Connor; July 10, 1933; The Bronx, New York City, U.S.
- Died: November 13, 2009 (aged 76); Manhattan, New York City, U.S.
- Education: City College of New York; Yale University
- Occupations: Journalist, critic

John Joseph O'Connor (July 10, 1933 – November 13, 2009) was an American journalist and critic. He was born in The Bronx, New York.

One of four sons born to Irish immigrant parents, he earned his bachelor's degree from City College of New York and his master's degree from Yale University.

He began his career as a copy editor at The Wall Street Journal in 1959, later becoming the Journal's arts editor and theater and dance critic, in which capacity he continued at The New York Times. He served at the Times for 25 years, mostly as a television critic. O'Connor was diagnosed with lung cancer four weeks before his death at the age of 76. He died at his home in Manhattan.
