= Sylvia Chase =

American journalist (1938–2019)

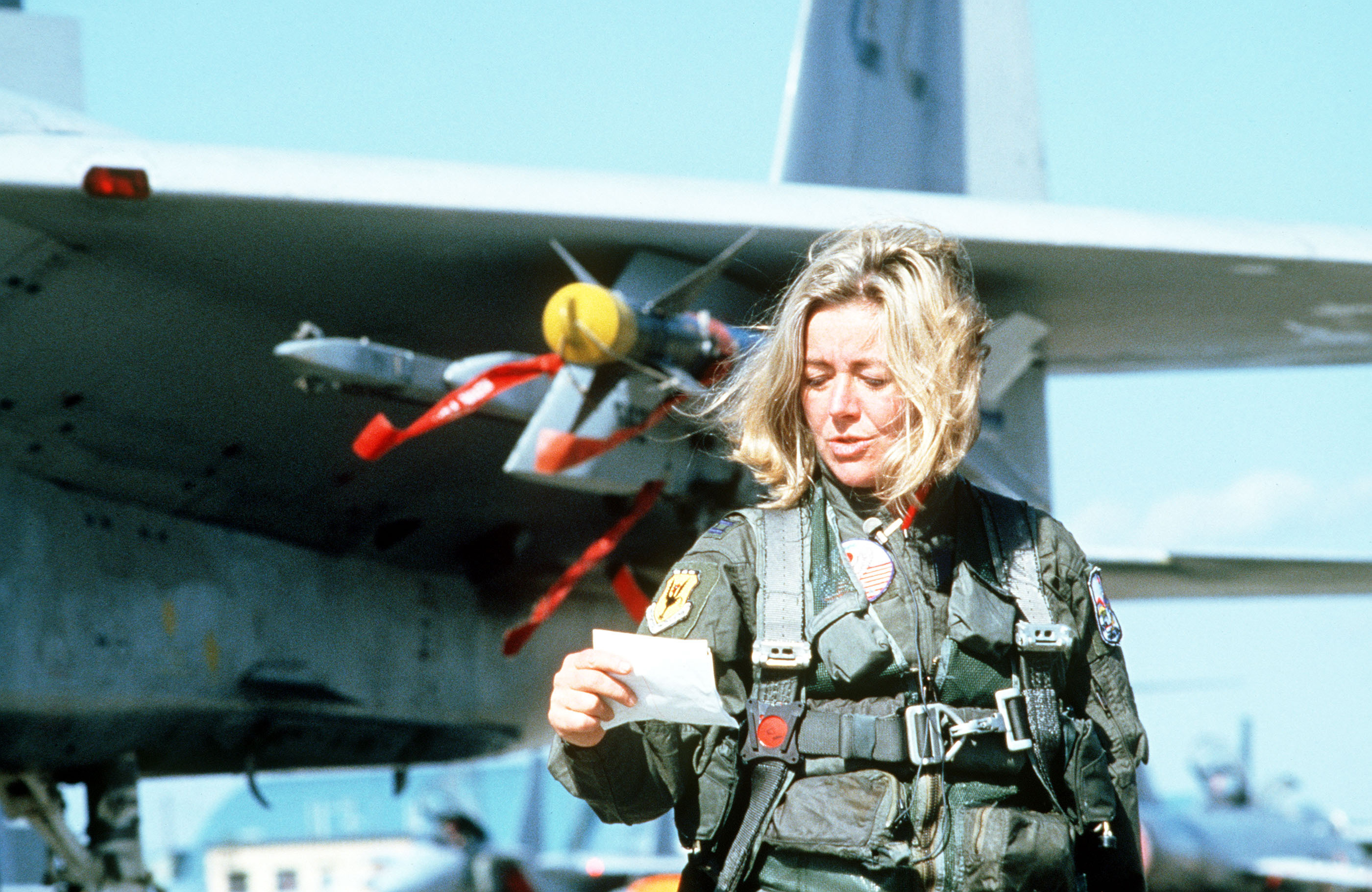
- Chase in 1983 prior to a flight in a military plane for a 20/20 segment
- Born: Sylvia Belle Chase; February 23, 1938; Northfield, Minnesota, U.S.
- Died: January 3, 2019 (aged 80); Marin County, California, U.S.
- Education: University of California, Los Angeles
- Occupation: Journalist
- Spouse: Robert Rosenstone
- Awards: Emmy Awards (x5); Peabody Award (1989)

Sylvia Belle Chase (February 23, 1938 – January 3, 2019) was an American broadcast journalist. She was a correspondent for ABC's 20/20 from its inception until 1985, when she left to become a news anchor at KRON-TV in San Francisco; in 1990 she returned to ABC News in New York.

== Early life and education ==
Chase was born in Northfield, Minnesota, where she graduated from Northfield High School. She was the youngest of three children. Her aunt was a radio announcer in Minneapolis, and in junior high school Sylvia and her sister produced a local radio show on news from the school.

Her parents divorced early in her childhood and she had foster parents; she refused a scholarship from Wellesley College to join her sister studying at the University of California in Los Angeles, where her father was living, but he died shortly before she started classes. She worked her way through a degree in English, graduating in 1961.

== Career ==
Chase managed the UCLA urban extension program; after graduation she was a temporary secretary and receptionist and modeled on weekends at I. Magnin; for some time she worked for Democratic California legislators and managed political campaigns in the state. In 1969 she went to work as a reporter at KNX, then a CBS radio station. She moved to New York in 1971, where she worked for CBS News and became a correspondent in 1974; she was the writer and narrator for a new radio show, The American Woman, which replaced the radio version of the advice column Dear Abby. She became one of the earliest prominent women reporters in the Walter Cronkite era of the CBS Evening News, persuading the network to cover stories such as the Coalition of Labor Union Women conference in 1974 in Chicago, and serving as a role model; she also headed the CBS employees' women's rights group that presented a list of concerns to the network president, Arthur Taylor. She anchored CBS Newsbreak and hosted the daytime Magazine news show, and also made appearances on 60 Minutes. She transferred in 1977 to ABC News, where she was a general assignment correspondent and co-anchor of ABC News Weekend Report.

She was a correspondent for 20/20 from its start in summer 1978 to 1985. TV Guide referred to her during this period as "the most trusted woman on TV" and readers voted her the best investigative reporter for the U.S. TV news magazines.

In late 1985, she left for San Francisco to take a job as a news anchor at KRON (San Francisco's NBC affiliate at the time). She later stated that ABC News president Roone Arledge's cancellation of a 20/20 story she had worked on based on a book by Anthony Summers about Marilyn Monroe's relationships with President Kennedy and his brother Bobby Kennedy, which was to have been featured in that year's season premiere, had precipitated the move; after being shortened and postponed, the segment was canceled shortly before it was to have aired. At the time of her move she denied a connection, and that her resignation was related to that of Geraldo Rivera, who left shortly before her after criticizing the decision. KRON advertised her arrival with the slogan "The Chase is on!". In addition to co-anchoring the station's news broadcasts, she also hosted news documentaries, including one on environmental degradation in Leningrad, and frequently reported on the AIDS crisis and on children. She was in Europe when the 1989 Loma Prieta earthquake struck the Bay Area.

In late 1990, she returned to ABC News in New York, telling the San Francisco Chronicle's columnist Herb Caen, "I hate to leave the Bay Area, but if I’m going to get mugged it might as well be in New York". She co-anchored Prime Time Live and was a correspondent for 20/20; among other work, she reported on an American woman whose children were taken by her Serbian ex-husband and narrated Hopkins 24/7, a six-hour documentary about the Johns Hopkins Hospital in Baltimore that aired in 2000. Following her investigative report on the death of Kimberly Bergalis, the US Centers for Disease Control and the American Dental Association both increased requirements for sterilization of dental equipment.

In 2001, when ABC cutbacks led to her contract not being renewed, she moved to PBS, where she was a contributing correspondent for Now with Bill Moyers and the narrator on Exposé: America's Investigative Reports. She retired to Belvedere, California.

== Awards ==
Chase's awards included the 1983 Pinnacle Award in Television News, the 1983 National Headliner Award for Outstanding Investigative Reporting, and two Emmy Awards for her 20/20 work, a Peabody Award for a KRON documentary on homeless children in 1989, three further Emmy awards for local news, the National Headliner Award in 1979, 1983, and 1994, and the 1991 Matrix Award from New York Women in Communications. She also received duPont-Columbia and Washington Press Club awards.

== Personal life and death ==
While in college Chase married Robert Rosenstone, a graduate student in journalism who became a history professor at the California Institute of Technology, and moved with him to Wisconsin; she returned to UCLA when they separated two years later, and they subsequently divorced. She had both a professional and a personal relationship with producer Stanhope Gould, whom she met at CBS and with whom she shared an Emmy for a report on cars with exploding gasoline tanks and also collaborated on the Monroe report and at KRON; they traveled together to Russia.

In retirement, she volunteered at De Marillac Academy, a Catholic middle school in the Tenderloin neighborhood of San Francisco; she made a documentary about one family whose children attended the school.

Chase was diabetic. She died on January 3, 2019, at the age of 80, after undergoing treatment for brain cancer.
