= Christopher Glenn =

American radio and television news journalist

Joseph Christopher Glenn (March 23, 1938 – October 17, 2006) was an American radio and television news journalist who worked in broadcasting for over 45 years and spent the final 35 years of his career at CBS, retiring on February 23, 2006 at the age of 68.

== Early life ==
Glenn was born in Queens, New York City. He earned a Bachelor's degree in English from the University of Colorado Boulder. His early years in broadcasting were spent working for the American Forces Network while he served in the United States Army in 1960.

== Career ==
Glenn worked at various radio stations in New York, Connecticut, and Washington, D.C. before joining CBS in 1971. While at CBS, Glenn worked in a variety of capacities in its news organization. He was a narrator for In the News, a long-running Emmy Award-winning TV news program geared toward children and young people, which aired between the network's Saturday morning children's shows. Glenn also appeared on camera as an anchor for the short-lived 30 Minutes, a young people's version of 60 Minutes.

He served as an anchor for two of the CBS Radio Network's signature news roundups carried by affiliates in the United States - The World Tonight (now the CBS World News Roundup Late Edition) from 1988 to 1999, and the morning CBS World News Roundup from 1999 until his retirement. Glenn's final morning broadcast occurred on February 23, 2006.

From 1982 to 1984, Glenn served as a television news anchor on CBS News Nightwatch, which aired from 2-6 a.m. weekdays.

Glenn made his best-known report on January 28, 1986, when he anchored CBS News Radio's live coverage of the launch of the Space Shuttle Challenger. Glenn had just signed off—after what was thought to have been a normal launch—when the shuttle disintegrated, killing the seven astronauts on board. "I had to get back on the air real fast to describe that, and had a very difficult time doing that," he recalled. Glenn and correspondent Frank Mottek (now a reporter at CBS Radio station KNX in Los Angeles) covered the Challenger disaster from that point as a CBS NetAlert bulletin.

Glenn was among the first CBS News correspondents to use a personal computer (an Apple II). Glenn continued to play sound clips in his newscasts from carts long after most of the industry had switched to computer-based playback systems.

== Personal life ==
Glenn married Dianne West in 1960, and had two daughters.

== Death ==
Glenn, who suffered from liver cancer, died suddenly on October 17, 2006 at the age of 68 in Norwalk, Connecticut. Glenn was posthumously inducted into the National Radio Hall of Fame in Chicago on November 4.

== See also ==
- CBS World News Roundup
