= In the News =

American television series

- Title card
- Narrated by: Christopher Glenn; Gary Shepard
- Country of origin: United States
- No. of seasons: 15

Production
- Camera setup: Single-camera
- Running time: 2 minutes (1971–85); 1:05 minutes (1985–86)
- Production company: CBS News

Original release
- Network: CBS
- Release: 1971 – 1986
- Release: 1997 – 1998

In the News is an American series of two-minute televised video segments that summarized topical news stories for children and pre-teens. The segments were broadcast in the United States on the CBS television network from 1971 until 1986, between Saturday morning animated cartoon programs, alongside features like Schoolhouse Rock! and One to Grow On, which aired on competing networks ABC and NBC, respectively. NBC also produced a competing segment called Ask NBC News.

The "micro-series" (as it would be labeled today) had its genesis in a series of animated interstitials produced by CBS and Hanna-Barbera Productions called In the Know, featuring Josie and the Pussycats narrating educational news segments tailored for children. This was eventually transformed into a more live-action-oriented micro-series produced solely by CBS' News division.

In the News segments attempted to explain the essence of complex news stories to children, and to do so in a way that might engage a young audience. Video clips of national or world events and special-interest stories were shown with voice-over narration specifically written with children in mind. Although news stories deemed to be inappropriate for children were not covered on In the News, the series did feature a wide range of current events.

The famous In the News sphere logo was actually two different logos; the first one has a non-spinning sphere while the title, written in something close to Times New Roman, spins around once, then fades into the news footage. The second logo was a spinning sphere and the title, now written in something close to Calibri, kept going around the opposite direction the sphere was moving (at the end of each segment, this logo was shown again, and then faded into the CBS Eye logo in the credits).

On occasion, a special mini-documentary segment, In the Future, was presented, examining events and technology that may exist in the near future.

CBS News journalists Christopher Glenn, Doug Poling, and Gary Shepard narrated the segments. Through the late 1970s through early 1980s, they were generally preceded by an animated bumper featuring a character from one of CBS' Saturday morning programs (such as Batman, The Robonic Stooges, Popeye, Mighty Mouse, or Bugs Bunny) announcing, "And now, another interesting story that's In the News!". It was also often included in the announcement during a show's bumper; "...will return after In the News and these messages."

== 30 Minutes ==
In the late 1970s, CBS News produced a Saturday afternoon news magazine for young viewers, 30 Minutes, which was along the same lines as In the News and the nighttime news magazine, 60 Minutes. The series aired irregularly from 1978 to 1982, with only a handful of repeating episodes, factors that kept the show from catching on widely. Christopher Glenn co-anchored 30 Minutes.

== Revival and rebroadcasts ==
The series was briefly revived as part of CBS's all-"educational/informational" Saturday morning lineup during the 1997–1998 season, but without the involvement of original narrators Glenn and Shepard. Three new one-minute segments were produced each week, narrated by CBS Radio News Washington Correspondent Dan Raviv.

Repeats of the original In the News were seen during commercial breaks on TV Land in the late 1990s.
