= 1968–69 United States network television schedule (daytime) =

The following is the 1968–69 daytime network television schedule for the three major English-language commercial broadcast networks in the United States. It covers the weekday and weekend daytime hours from September 1968 to August 1969.

Talk shows are highlighted in yellow, local programming is white, reruns of older programming are orange, game shows are pink, soap operas are chartreuse, news programs are gold, children's programs are light purple and sports programs are light blue. New series are highlighted in bold.

== Monday-Friday ==
Network		6:00 am	6:30 am	7:00 am	7:30 am	8:00 am	8:30 am	9:00 am	9:30 am	10:00 am	10:30 am	11:00 am	11:30 am	noon	12:30 pm	1:00 pm	1:30 pm	2:00 pm	2:30 pm	3:00 pm	3:30 pm	4:00 pm	4:30 pm	5:00 pm	5:30 pm	6:00 pm	6:30 pm
ABC	Fall	Local									The Dick Cavett Show			Bewitched	Treasure Isle	Dream House	It's Happening 1:55: The Children's Doctor	The Newlywed Game	The Dating Game	General Hospital	One Life to Live	Dark Shadows	Local			ABC Evening News	Local
ABC	mid-Fall	Local									The Dick Cavett Show			Bewitched	Treasure Isle	Dream House	**Funny You Should Ask** 1:55: The Children's Doctor	The Newlywed Game	The Dating Game	General Hospital	One Life to Live	Dark Shadows	Local			ABC Evening News	Local
ABC	Winter	Local												Bewitched	Funny You Should Ask 12:55: The Children's Doctor	Dream House	Let's Make a Deal	The Newlywed Game	The Dating Game	General Hospital	One Life to Live	Dark Shadows	Local			ABC Evening News	Local
ABC	Summer	Local												Bewitched	**That Girl**	Dream House	Let's Make a Deal	The Newlywed Game	The Dating Game	General Hospital	One Life to Live	Dark Shadows	Local			ABC News	Local
CBS	Fall	Sunrise Semester	Local	7:05: CBS Morning News	Local	Captain Kangaroo		Local		**The Lucy Show**	The Beverly Hillbillies	The Andy Griffith Show	The Dick Van Dyke Show	Love of Life 12:25 pm: CBS News	Search for Tomorrow	Local	As the World Turns	Love Is a Many Splendored Thing	The Guiding Light	The Secret Storm	The Edge of Night	Art Linkletter's House Party 4:25: CBS News	Local				CBS Evening News
CBS	Spring	Sunrise Semester	Local	7:05: CBS Morning News	Local	Captain Kangaroo		Local		**The Lucy Show**	The Beverly Hillbillies	The Andy Griffith Show	The Dick Van Dyke Show	Love of Life 12:25 pm: CBS News	Search for Tomorrow	Local	As the World Turns	Love Is a Many Splendored Thing	The Guiding Light	The Secret Storm	The Edge of Night	The Linkletter Show 4:25: CBS News	Local				CBS Evening News
CBS	Summer	Sunrise Semester	Local	CBS Morning News		Captain Kangaroo		Local		**The Lucy Show**	The Beverly Hillbillies	The Andy Griffith Show	The Dick Van Dyke Show	Love of Life 12:25 pm: CBS News	Search for Tomorrow	Local	As the World Turns	Love Is a Many Splendored Thing	The Guiding Light	The Secret Storm	The Edge of Night	The Linkletter Show	Local				CBS Evening News
NBC	Fall	Local		Today				Local		Snap Judgment 10:25: NBC News	Concentration	Personality	Hollywood Squares	Jeopardy!	Eye Guess 12:55: NBC News	Local	Let's Make a Deal	Days of Our Lives	The Doctors	Another World	You Don't Say!	The Match Game 4:25: NBC News	Local				The Huntley–Brinkley Report
NBC	Winter	Local		Today				Local		Snap Judgment 10:25: NBC News	Concentration	Personality	Hollywood Squares	Jeopardy!	Eye Guess 12:55: NBC News	Local	**Hidden Faces**	Days of Our Lives	The Doctors	Another World	You Don't Say!	The Match Game 4:25: NBC News	Local				The Huntley–Brinkley Report
NBC	Spring	Local		Today				Local		**It Takes Two** 10:25: NBC News	Concentration	Personality	Hollywood Squares	Jeopardy!	Eye Guess 12:55: NBC News	Local	**Hidden Faces**	Days of Our Lives	The Doctors	Another World	You Don't Say!	The Match Game 4:25: NBC News	Local				The Huntley–Brinkley Report
NBC	Summer	Local		Today				Local		**It Takes Two** 10:25: NBC News	Concentration	Personality	Hollywood Squares	Jeopardy!	Eye Guess 12:55: NBC News	Local	**You're Putting Me On**	Days of Our Lives	The Doctors	Another World	You Don't Say!	The Match Game 4:25: NBC News	Local				The Huntley–Brinkley Report

== Saturday ==
Network		6:00 am	6:30 am	7:00 am	7:30 am	8:00 am	8:30 am	9:00 am	9:30 am	10:00 am	10:30 am	11:00 am	11:30 am	noon	12:30 pm	1:00 pm	1:30 pm	2:00 pm	2:30 pm	3:00 pm	3:30 pm	4:00 pm	4:30 pm	5:00 pm	5:30 pm	6:00 pm	6:30 pm
ABC	Fall	Local						The New Casper Cartoon Show (R)	**The Adventures of Gulliver**	Spider-Man	Fantastic Voyage	Journey to the Center of the Earth (R)	The Fantastic Four	George of the Jungle (R)	The New American Bandstand 1969		ABC Sports and/or local										
ABC	Winter	Local						The New Casper Cartoon Show (R)	**The Adventures of Gulliver**	Spider-Man	Fantastic Voyage	Journey to the Center of the Earth (R)	The Fantastic Four	George of the Jungle (R)	The New American Bandstand 1969		Happening '69	ABC Sports and/or local									
ABC	February	Local						The New Casper Cartoon Show (R)	**The Adventures of Gulliver**	Spider-Man	Fantastic Voyage	Journey to the Center of the Earth (R)	The Fantastic Four	George of the Jungle (R)	The New American Bandstand 1969		Happening	ABC Sports and/or local									
CBS	Fall	Local	Sunrise Semester	Local		**The Go Go Gophers Show**	The Bugs Bunny/Road Runner Hour		**Wacky Races**	**The Archie Show**	The Batman/Superman Hour		The Herculoids (R)	Shazzan (R)	Jonny Quest (R)	Moby Dick and the Mighty Mightor (R)	The Lone Ranger (R)	CBS Sports and/or local									CBS Evening News
CBS	Summer	Local	**Black Heritage**	Local		**The Go Go Gophers Show**	The Bugs Bunny/Road Runner Hour		**Wacky Races**	**The Archie Show**	The Batman/Superman Hour		The Herculoids (R)	Shazzan (R)	Jonny Quest (R)	Moby Dick and the Mighty Mightor (R)	The Lone Ranger (R)	CBS Sports and/or local									CBS Evening News
NBC	Fall	Local						The Super 6 (R)	Top Cat (R)	The Flintstones (R)	The Banana Splits Adventure Hour		Underdog (R)	Birdman and the Galaxy Trio (R)	Super President	NBC Sports and/or local				Speaking Freely		NBC Sports and/or local		Campaign and the Candidates	College Bowl	Local	The Frank McGee Report
NBC	November	Local						The Super 6 (R)	Top Cat (R)	The Flintstones (R)	The Banana Splits Adventure Hour		Underdog (R)	Birdman and the Galaxy Trio (R)	Super President	NBC Sports and/or local				Speaking Freely		NBC Sports and/or local			College Bowl	Local	The Frank McGee Report
NBC	Winter	Local						The Super 6 (R)	Top Cat (R)	The Flintstones (R)	The Banana Splits Adventure Hour		Underdog (R)	**Storybook Squares**	**The Untamed World**	NBC Sports and/or local								Shell's Wonderful World of Golf		Local	The Huntley–Brinkley Report
NBC	Spring	Local						The Super 6 (R)	Top Cat (R)	The Flintstones (R)	The Banana Splits Adventure Hour		Underdog (R)	**Storybook Squares**	**The Untamed World**	NBC Sports and/or local											The Huntley–Brinkley Report
NBC	Summer	Local						The Super 6 (R)	Cool McCool (R)	The Flintstones (R)	The Banana Splits Adventure Hour		Underdog (R)	**Storybook Squares**	**The Untamed World**	NBC Sports and/or local											The Huntley–Brinkley Report

== Sunday ==
Network		7:00 am	7:30 am	8:00 am	8:30 am	9:00 am	9:30 am	10:00 am	10:30 am	11:00 am	11:30 am	noon	12:30 pm	1:00 pm	1:30 pm	2:00 pm	2:30 pm	3:00 pm	3:30 pm	4:00 pm	4:30 pm	5:00 pm	5:30 pm	6:00 pm	6:30 pm
ABC	Fall	local programming					The New Beatles (R)	Linus the Lionhearted	The King Kong Show (R)	The Bullwinkle Show (R)	Discovery	local programming		Directions	Issues and Answers	ABC Sports and/or local									
ABC	Spring	local programming					**The Dudley Do-Right Show**	Linus the Lionhearted	The King Kong Show (R)	The Bullwinkle Show (R)	Discovery	local programming		Directions	Issues and Answers	ABC Sports and/or local									
ABC	Summer	local programming					**The Dudley Do-Right Show**	Linus the Lionhearted	The King Kong Show (R)	The Bullwinkle Show (R)	Discovery	local programming			Issues and Answers	ABC Sports and/or local									
CBS	Fall	local programming				Tom and Jerry	Aquaman	Lamp Unto My Feet	Look Up and Live	Camera Three	local programming		Face the Nation	NFL on CBS and/or local programming									Ted Mack's Amateur Hour	The 21st Century	Local
CBS	Winter	local programming				Tom and Jerry	Aquaman	Lamp Unto My Feet	Look Up and Live	Camera Three	local programming		Face the Nation	CBS Sports and/or local programming									Ted Mack's Amateur Hour	The 21st Century	Local
NBC	Fall	local programming										Youth Forum	Frontiers of Faith / Eternal Light / Catholic Hour	Meet the Press	AFL on NBC and/or local										
NBC	Winter	local programming										Youth Forum	local programming	Meet the Press	Frontiers of Faith / Eternal Light / **Guideline**	Speaking Freely		NBC Sports and/or local programming					The Frank McGee Report	College Bowl	Wild Kingdom
NBC	Summer	local programming						Youth Forum	local programming					Meet the Press	Frontiers of Faith / Eternal Light / **Guideline**	Speaking Freely		NBC Sports and/or local programming						Congressional Report	The Frank McGee Report

== By network ==
=== ABC ===
Returning series:

- ABC News
- The New Beatles (reruns)
- Bewitched (reruns)
- The Bullwinkle Show
- The Children's Doctor
- Dark Shadows
- The Dating Game
- The Dick Cavett Show
- Discovery
- Dream House
- The Fantastic Four Show
- General Hospital
- George of the Jungle
- Issues and Answers
- Filmation's Journey to the Center of the Earth
- The King Kong Show (reruns)
- Let's Make a Deal (moved from NBC)
- Linus the Lionhearted
- It's Happening!
- The New American Bandstand 1969
- The New Casper Cartoon Show
- The Newlywed Game
- One Life to Live
- Spider-Man
- Treasure Isle

New series:

- **The Adventures of Gulliver**
- **The Dudley Do-Right Show**
- **Fantastic Voyage**
- **Funny You Should Ask**
- **Happening '69** (January 4–25) & **Happening** (from February 1 to September 20, 1969)
- **That Girl** (reruns)

Not returning from 1967-68:

- The Baby Game
- Dateline:Hollywood
- The Dream Girl of '67
- The Beagles (reruns)
- The Donna Reed Show (reruns)
- Everybody's Talking
- The Family Game
- The Fugitive (reruns)
- The Honeymoon Race
- The Magilla Gorilla Show
- How's Your Mother-In-Law?
- The Milton the Monster Show
- News with the Woman's Touch
- Peter Jennings with the News
- The Peter Potamus Show (reruns)
- Temptation
- Tennessee Tuxedo and His Tales (reruns)
- This Morning with Dick Cavett
- Wedding Party

=== CBS ===
Returning series:

- The Andy Griffith Show (reruns)
- **Aquaman** (reruns)
- Art Linkletter's House Party
- As the World Turns
- The Beverly Hillbillies (reruns)
- The Bugs Bunny/Road Runner Hour
- Camera Three
- Captain Kangaroo
- CBS Evening News
- CBS Morning News
- CBS News
- The Dick Van Dyke Show (reruns)
- The Edge of Night
- Face the Nation
- The Guiding Light
- The Herculoids (reruns)
- Jonny Quest (reruns)
- Lamp Unto My Feet
- The Linkletter Show
- The Lone Ranger
- Look Up and Live
- Love Is a Many Splendored Thing
- Love of Life
- Moby Dick and Mighty Mightor
- The NFL Today
- The Original Amateur Hour / The New Ted Mack & the Original Amateur Hour
- Search for Tomorrow
- The Secret Storm
- Shazzan
- Sunrise Semester
- Tom and Jerry

New series:

- **The Archie Show**
- **The Batman/Superman Hour**
- **The Go Go Gophers Show**
- **The Lucy Show** (reruns)
- **Wacky Races**

Not returning from 1967-68:

- Frankenstein Jr. and The Impossibles
- The Road Runner Show (Combined into The Bugs Bunny/Road Runner Hour)
- Space Ghost and Dino Boy
- The Superman/Aquaman Hour of Adventure
- To Tell the Truth (returned in 1969 in syndication)
- Underdog (Returned to NBC)

=== NBC ===
Returning series:

- Another World
- Birdman and the Galaxy Trio
- Concentration
- Cool McCool
- Days of Our Lives
- The Doctors
- Eye Guess
- The Flintstones reruns
- The Frank McGee Report
- Frontiers of Faith
- Hollywood Squares
- Jeopardy!
- The Match Game
- Meet the Press
- NBC News
- NBC Saturday Night News
- NBC Sunday Night News
- Personality
- Snap Judgment
- Super President & Spy Shadow
- The Super 6
- The Today Show
- Top Cat reruns
- The Underdog Show reruns (Moved from CBS)
- You Don't Say!

New series:

- **The Banana Splits Adventure Hour**
- **Hidden Faces**
- **It Takes Two**
- **Storybook Squares**
- **The Untamed World**
- **You're Putting Me On**

Not returning from 1967-68:

- The Atom Ant/Secret Squirrel Show
- Let's Make a Deal (Moved to ABC)
- Samson & Goliath
- Young Samson

== See also ==
- 1968-69 United States network television schedule (prime-time)
- 1968-69 United States network television schedule (late night)

== Sources ==
- Castleman & Podrazik, The TV Schedule Book, McGraw-Hill Paperbacks, 1984
- TV schedules, **NEW YORK TIMES**, September 1968-September 1969 (microfilm)
