= 1967–68 United States network television schedule (daytime) =

The following is the 1967–68 daytime network television schedule for the three major English-language commercial broadcast networks in the United States. It covers the weekday and weekend daytime hours from September 1967 to August 1968.

Talk shows are highlighted in yellow, local programming is white, reruns of older programming are orange, game shows are pink, soap operas are chartreuse, news programs are gold, children's programs are light purple and sports programs are light blue. New series are highlighted in bold.

Note: This is the first full season in which all the three networks broadcast most of their weekday schedules in color.

Note: Please refer to the discussion page before attempting to edit.

== Monday-Friday ==
Network		6:00 am	6:30 am	7:00 am	7:30 am	8:00 am	8:30 am	9:00 am	9:30 am	10:00 am	10:30 am	11:00 am	11:30 am	noon	12:30 pm	1:00 pm	1:30 pm	2:00 pm	2:30 pm	3:00 pm	3:30 pm	4:00 pm	4:30 pm	5:00 pm	5:30 pm	6:00 pm	6:30 pm
ABC	Fall	Local									Dateline: Hollywood 10:55: The Children's Doctor	The Honeymoon Race In COLOR	The Family Game In COLOR	Everybody's Talking	The Donna Reed Show (R)	The Fugitive (R)		The Newlywed Game In COLOR	Dream Girl of '67 In COLOR 2:55: News with the Woman's Touch	General Hospital (In COLOR starting 10/23)	Dark Shadows In COLOR	The Dating Game In COLOR	Local			Peter Jennings with the News In COLOR	Local
ABC	October	Local									Canadian Features		The Family Game In COLOR	Everybody's Talking	The Donna Reed Show (R)	The Fugitive (R)		The Newlywed Game In COLOR	Dream Girl of '67 In COLOR 2:55: News with the Woman's Touch	General Hospital (In COLOR starting 10/23)	Dark Shadows In COLOR	The Dating Game In COLOR	Local			ABC Evening News In COLOR	Local
ABC	December	Local									The Family Game In COLOR	**Temptation** In COLOR 11:25: The Children's Doctor (News with the Woman's Touch effective 1/1/68)	**How's Your Mother-in-Law?** In COLOR	Everybody's Talking	The Donna Reed Show (R)	The Fugitive (R)		The Newlywed Game In COLOR	Dream Girl of '67 In COLOR 2:55: News with the Woman's Touch	General Hospital (In COLOR starting 10/23)	Dark Shadows In COLOR	The Dating Game In COLOR	Local			ABC Evening News In COLOR	Local
ABC	Late December	Local									The Donna Reed Show (R)	**Temptation** In COLOR 11:25: The Children's Doctor (News with the Woman's Touch effective 1/1/68)	**How's Your Mother-in-Law?** In COLOR	Everybody's Talking	**Treasure Isle** In COLOR	The Fugitive (R)		The Newlywed Game In COLOR	Dream Girl of '67 In COLOR 2:55: News with the Woman's Touch	General Hospital (In COLOR starting 10/23)	Dark Shadows In COLOR	The Dating Game In COLOR	Local			ABC Evening News In COLOR	Local
ABC	Winter	Local									The Donna Reed Show (R)	**Temptation** In COLOR 11:25: The Children's Doctor (News with the Woman's Touch effective 1/1/68)	**How's Your Mother-in-Law?** In COLOR	**Bewitched** (R)	**Treasure Isle** In COLOR	The Fugitive (R)		The Newlywed Game In COLOR	**The Baby Game** In COLOR 2:55: The Children's Doctor	General Hospital (In COLOR starting 10/23)	Dark Shadows In COLOR	The Dating Game In COLOR	Local			ABC Evening News In COLOR	Local
ABC	Spring	Local									**This Morning with Dick Cavett** In COLOR			**Bewitched** (R)	**Treasure Isle** In COLOR	**Dream House** In COLOR	**Wedding Party** In COLOR	The Newlywed Game In COLOR	**The Baby Game** In COLOR 2:55: The Children's Doctor	General Hospital (In COLOR starting 10/23)	Dark Shadows In COLOR	The Dating Game In COLOR	Local			ABC Evening News In COLOR	Local
ABC	Summer	Local									**The Dick Cavett Show** In COLOR			**Bewitched** (R)	**Treasure Isle** In COLOR	**Dream House** In COLOR	**It's Happening** In COLOR 1:55: The Children's Doctor	The Newlywed Game In COLOR	The Dating Game In COLOR	General Hospital (In COLOR starting 10/23)	**One Life to Live** In COLOR	Dark Shadows In COLOR	Local			ABC Evening News In COLOR	Local
CBS		Sunrise Semester In COLOR	Local	7:05: CBS Morning News In COLOR	Local	Captain Kangaroo In COLOR		Local		Candid Camera (R)	The Beverly Hillbillies (R)	Andy of Mayberry (R)	The Dick Van Dyke Show (R)	Love of Life (In COLOR starting 10/23) 12:55: CBS News	12:30: Search for Tomorrow (In COLOR starting 9/11) 12:45: The Guiding Light In COLOR	Local	As the World Turns In COLOR	**Love is a Many Splendored Thing** In COLOR	Art Linkletter's House Party In COLOR	To Tell the Truth In COLOR 3:25: CBS News	The Edge of Night (In COLOR starting 9/5)	The Secret Storm (In COLOR starting 9/11)	Local				CBS Evening News In COLOR
NBC		Local		Today In COLOR				Local		Snap Judgment In COLOR 10:25: NBC News	Concentration In COLOR	Personality In COLOR	The Hollywood Squares In COLOR	Jeopardy! In COLOR	Eye Guess In COLOR 12:55: NBC News	Local	Let's Make a Deal In COLOR	Days of Our Lives In COLOR	The Doctors In COLOR	Another World In COLOR	You Don't Say! In COLOR	The Match Game In COLOR 4:25: NBC News	Local				The Huntley–Brinkley Report In COLOR

Note: On CBS, both Search for Tomorrow and Guiding Light expanded from 15 to 30 minutes on Monday September 9, 1968. They were the last two 15-minute soap operas airing on television, ending a 22-season era of 15 minute soap operas which had begun with the first ever soap opera on television, Faraway Hill, on the DuMont network in 1946. As a result of those expansions, (The) Guiding Light was moved to 2:30 PM resulting in Art Linkletter's House Party in being pushed forward to 4:00 PM. The Edge of Night and The Secret Storm were also moved to 3:00 and 3:30 PM for respectively. As a result of this scheduling shuffle the program at CBS, To Tell The Truth aired its last broadcast on Friday September 6, 1968. Otherwise, the remainder stayed as is.

== Saturday ==
Network		6:00 am	6:30 am	7:00 am	7:30 am	8:00 am	8:30 am	9:00 am	9:30 am	10:00 am	10:30 am	11:00 am	11:30 am	noon	12:30 pm	1:00 pm	1:30 pm	2:00 pm	2:30 pm	3:00 pm	3:30 pm	4:00 pm	4:30 pm	5:00 pm	5:30 pm	6:00 pm	6:30 pm
ABC	Fall	Local						The New Casper Cartoon Show (R)	**The Fantastic Four** In COLOR	**Spider-Man** In COLOR	**Journey to the Center of the Earth** In COLOR	The King Kong Show In COLOR	**George of the Jungle** In COLOR	The New Beatles In COLOR	The New American Bandstand 1968 In COLOR		ABC Sports In COLOR and/or local							Wide World of Sports In COLOR			Local
ABC	Winter	Local						The New Casper Cartoon Show (R)	**The Fantastic Four** In COLOR	**Spider-Man** In COLOR	**Journey to the Center of the Earth** In COLOR	The King Kong Show In COLOR	**George of the Jungle** In COLOR	The New Beatles In COLOR	The New American Bandstand 1968 In COLOR		**Happening '68** In COLOR	ABC Sports In COLOR and/or local						Wide World of Sports In COLOR			Local
CBS	Fall	Local	Sunrise Semester In COLOR	Local		Captain Kangaroo In COLOR		Frankenstein Jr. and The Impossibles (R)	**The Herculoids** In COLOR	**Shazzan** In COLOR	Space Ghost and Dino Boy In COLOR	**Moby Dick and Mighty Mightor** In COLOR	The Superman/Aquaman Hour of Adventure In COLOR		Jonny Quest (R)	The Lone Ranger In COLOR	The Road Runner Show In COLOR	CBS Sports In COLOR and/or local									CBS Evening News In COLOR
CBS	Summer	Local	Summer Semester In COLOR	Local		Captain Kangaroo In COLOR		Frankenstein Jr. and The Impossibles (R)	**The Herculoids** In COLOR	**Shazzan** In COLOR	Space Ghost and Dino Boy In COLOR	**Moby Dick and Mighty Mightor** In COLOR	The Superman/Aquaman Hour of Adventure In COLOR		Jonny Quest (R)	The Lone Ranger In COLOR	The Road Runner Show In COLOR	CBS Sports In COLOR and/or local									CBS Evening News In COLOR
NBC	Fall	Local						The Super 6 (R)	**Super President and Spy Shadow** In COLOR	The Flintstones (R)	**Samson & Goliath** In COLOR	**Birdman and the Galaxy Trio** In COLOR	The Atom Ant/Secret Squirrel Show (R)	Top Cat (R)	Cool McCool (R)	NBC Sports In COLOR and/or local									College Bowl In COLOR	Local	The Frank McGee Report In COLOR
NBC	Winter	Local						The Super 6 (R)	**Super President and Spy Shadow** In COLOR	The Flintstones (R)	**Samson & Goliath** In COLOR	**Birdman and the Galaxy Trio** In COLOR	The Atom Ant/Secret Squirrel Show (R)	Top Cat (R)	Cool McCool (R)	NBC Sports In COLOR and/or local								Shell's Wonderful World of Golf In COLOR		Local	The Frank McGee Report In COLOR
NBC	Spring	Local						The Super 6 (R)	**Super President and Spy Shadow** In COLOR	The Flintstones (R)	Young Samson In COLOR	**Birdman and the Galaxy Trio** In COLOR	The Atom Ant/Secret Squirrel Show (R)	Top Cat (R)	Cool McCool (R)	NBC Sports In COLOR and/or local										Local	The Frank McGee Report In COLOR
NBC	Summer	Local						The Super 6 (R)	**Super President and Spy Shadow** In COLOR	The Flintstones (R)	Young Samson In COLOR	**Birdman and the Galaxy Trio** In COLOR	The Atom Ant/Secret Squirrel Show (R)	Cool McCool (R)	NBC Sports In COLOR and/or local												The Frank McGee Report In COLOR

== Sunday ==
Network		7:00 am	7:30 am	8:00 am	8:30 am	9:00 am	9:30 am	10:00 am	10:30 am	11:00 am	11:30 am	noon	12:30 pm	1:00 pm	1:30 pm	2:00 pm	2:30 pm	3:00 pm	3:30 pm	4:00 pm	4:30 pm	5:00 pm	5:30 pm	6:00 pm	6:30 pm
ABC	Fall	Local programming					The Milton the Monster Show (R)	Linus the Lionhearted In COLOR	The Peter Potamus Show (R)	The Bullwinkle Show (R)	Discovery In COLOR	local programming		Directions	Issues and Answers In COLOR	ABC Sports In COLOR and/or local				The Beagles (R)	The Magilla Gorilla Show (R)	ABC Sports In COLOR and/or local			
ABC	Winter	Local programming					The Milton the Monster Show (R)	Linus the Lionhearted In COLOR	The Bugs Bunny Show (R)	The Bullwinkle Show (R)	Discovery In COLOR	local programming		Directions	Issues and Answers In COLOR	ABC Sports In COLOR and/or local									
ABC	May	Local programming					The Milton the Monster Show (R)	Linus the Lionhearted In COLOR	The Bugs Bunny Show (R)	The Bullwinkle Show (R)	Discovery In COLOR	local programming			Issues and Answers In COLOR	ABC Sports In COLOR and/or local									
CBS	Fall	Local programming				Tom and Jerry In COLOR	Underdog (R)	Lamp Unto My Feet In COLOR	Look Up and Live In COLOR	Camera Three In COLOR	local programming		Face the Nation In COLOR	NFL on CBS In COLOR and/or local programming								Celebrity Game	Ted Mack's Amateur Hour In COLOR	The 21st Century In COLOR	Local
CBS	November	Local programming				Tom and Jerry In COLOR	Underdog (R)	Lamp Unto My Feet In COLOR	Look Up and Live In COLOR	Camera Three In COLOR	local programming		Face the Nation In COLOR	NFL on CBS In COLOR and/or local programming											
CBS	Winter	Local programming				Tom and Jerry In COLOR	Underdog (R)	Lamp Unto My Feet In COLOR	Look Up and Live In COLOR	Camera Three In COLOR	local programming		Face the Nation In COLOR	CBS Sports In COLOR and/or local programming							CBS Children's Film Festival / Specials		Ted Mack's Amateur Hour In COLOR	The 21st Century In COLOR	Local
CBS	Spring	Local programming				Tom and Jerry In COLOR	Underdog (R)	Lamp Unto My Feet In COLOR	Look Up and Live In COLOR	Camera Three In COLOR	local programming		Face the Nation In COLOR	CBS Sports In COLOR and/or local programming									Ted Mack's Amateur Hour In COLOR	The 21st Century In COLOR	Local
NBC	Fall	local programming						Youth Forum	local programming			**Speaking Freely**		Meet the Press In COLOR	Frontiers of Faith / Eternal Light / Catholic Hour	AFL on NBC In COLOR and/or local									
NBC	November	local programming						Youth Forum	local programming			**Speaking Freely**		Meet the Press In COLOR	Frontiers of Faith / Eternal Light / Catholic Hour	NBC Sports In COLOR and/or local programming								College Bowl In COLOR	The Frank McGee Report In COLOR
NBC	Winter	local programming						Youth Forum	local programming			**Speaking Freely**		Meet the Press In COLOR	Frontiers of Faith / Eternal Light / Catholic Hour	NBC Sports In COLOR and/or local programming						Animal Secrets / Specials	The Frank McGee Report In COLOR	College Bowl In COLOR	Flipper (R)
NBC	Spring	local programming						Youth Forum	local programming			**Speaking Freely**		Meet the Press In COLOR	Frontiers of Faith / Eternal Light / Catholic Hour	NBC Sports In COLOR and/or local programming						Vietnam: The War This Week	The Frank McGee Report In COLOR	College Bowl In COLOR	Flipper (R)
NBC	Summer	local programming						Youth Forum	local programming			**Speaking Freely**		Meet the Press In COLOR	Frontiers of Faith / Eternal Light / Catholic Hour	NBC Sports In COLOR and/or local programming							Campaign and the Candidates	The Frank McGee Report In COLOR	**Animal World** In COLOR

== By network ==
=== ABC ===
Returning series:

- ABC News
- The Beagles (reruns) (moved from CBS)
- The Bullwinkle Show
- The Children's Doctor
- The Dating Game
- Dateline:Hollywood
- Discovery
- The Donna Reed Show (reruns)
- Dream Girl of '67
- Everybody's Talking
- The Family Game
- The Fugitive (reruns)
- General Hospital
- The Honeymoon Race
- Issues and Answers
- Let's Make a Deal
- Linus the Lionhearted
- The Magilla Gorilla Show
- It's Happening
- The Milton the Monster Show
- The New American Bandstand 1968
- The New Beatles (reruns)
- The New Casper Cartoon Show
- The Newlywed Game
- News with the Woman's Touch
- Peter Jennings with the News
- The Peter Potamus Show reruns

New series:

- **The Baby Game**
- **Bewitched** (reruns)
- **Dark Shadows**
- **The Dick Cavett Show**
- **Dream House**
- **Fantastic Four**
- **George of the Jungle**
- **Happening '68**
- **How's Your Mother-In-Law?**
- **Journey to the Center of the Earth**
- **One Life to Live**
- **Spider-Man**
- **Temptation**
- **This Morning with Dick Cavett**
- **Treasure Isle**
- **Wedding Party**

Not returning from 1966-67:

- Beany and Cecil (reruns)
- Ben Casey (reruns)
- The Bugs Bunny Show (reruns; returned in 1968 on CBS)
- Father Knows Best (reruns)
- The Honeymoon Race
- Hoppity Hooper
- The Nurses
- One in a Million
- The Porky Pig Show (reruns)
- Supermarket Sweep
- A Time for Us
- Where the Action Is

=== CBS ===
Returning series:

- Andy of Mayberry (reruns)
- Art Linkletter's House Party
- As the World Turns
- The Beverly Hillbillies (reruns)
- Camera Three
- Captain Kangaroo
- CBS Evening News
- CBS Morning News
- CBS News
- The Dick Van Dyke Show (reruns)
- The Edge of Night
- Face the Nation
- Frankenstein Jr. and The Impossibles
- The Guiding Light
- Jonny Quest (reruns)
- Lamp Unto My Feet
- The Linkletter Show
- The Lone Ranger
- Look Up and Live
- Love of Life
- The NFL Today
- The Road Runner Show
- Search for Tomorrow
- The Secret Storm
- Shazzan
- Space Ghost and Dino Boy
- Sunrise Semester
- The Superman/Aquaman Hour of Adventure
- Ted Mack's Amateur Hour
- To Tell the Truth
- Tom and Jerry
- Underdog
- Where the Heart Is

**New series**

- **The Herculoids** (reruns)
- **Love is a Many Splendored Thing**
- **Moby Dick and Mighty Mightor**
- **Shazzan**

Not returning from 1966-67:

- Candid Camera (reruns)
- Mighty Mouse & The Mighty Heroes
- Password (returned in 1971 on ABC)
- The Beagles (moved to ABC)

=== NBC ===
**Returning series**

- Another World
- Another World in Bay City
- The Atom Ant/Secret Squirrel Show
- Concentration
- Cool McCool
- Days of Our Lives
- The Doctors
- Eye Guess
- The Flintstones reruns
- The Frank McGee Report
- Frontiers of Faith
- Hidden Faces
- The Hollywood Squares
- Jeopardy!
- Let's Make a Deal
- The Match Game
- Meet the Press
- NBC News
- NBC Saturday Night News
- NBC Sunday Night News
- Personality
- Snap Judgment
- The Super 6
- Today
- Top Cat reruns
- You Don't Say!
- Young Samson

**New series**

- **Animal World**
- **Birdman and the Galaxy Trio**
- **Samson & Goliath**
- **Super President and Spy Shadow**

Not returning from 1966-67:

- Animal Secrets
- The Bell Telephone Hour / Actuality Specials
- The Jetsons reruns
- The Smithsonian
- The Space Kidettes

== See also ==
- 1967-68 United States network television schedule (prime-time)
- 1967-68 United States network television schedule (late night)

== Sources ==
- Hyatt, Wesley, The Encyclopedia Of Daytime Television. New York: Billboard Books, 1997.
