= 1966–67 United States network television schedule (daytime) =

The following is the 1966–67 daytime network television schedule for the three major English-language commercial broadcast networks in the United States. It covers the weekday and weekend daytime hours from September 1966 to August 1967.

Talk shows are highlighted in yellow, local programming is white, reruns of older programming are orange, game shows are pink, soap operas are chartreuse, news programs are gold, children's programs are light purple and sports programs are light blue. New series are highlighted in bold.

Note: This is the first full season in which practically all NBC weekday programs were in color.

== Monday-Friday ==
Network		7:00 am	7:30 am	8:00 am	8:30 am	9:00 am	9:30 am	10:00 am	10:30 am	11:00 am	11:30 am	noon	12:30 pm	1:00 pm	1:30 pm	2:00 pm	2:30 pm	3:00 pm	3:30 pm	4:00 pm	4:30 pm	5:00 pm	5:30 pm	6:00 pm	6:30 pm
ABC	Fall	Local								Supermarket Sweep	The Dating Game	The Donna Reed Show (R)	Father Knows Best (R)	Ben Casey (R)		The Newlywed Game (In COLOR starting 4/3)	A Time for Us 2:55 pm: News with the Woman's Touch	General Hospital	The Nurses	Dark Shadows	Where the Action Is	Local		Peter Jennings with the News 6:15: Local	Local
ABC	December	Local								Supermarket Sweep	The Dating Game	The Donna Reed Show (R)	Father Knows Best (R)	Ben Casey (R)		The Newlywed Game (In COLOR starting 4/3)	**Dream Girl of '67** (In COLOR starting 4/3) 2:55: News with the Woman's Touch	General Hospital	The Nurses	Dark Shadows	Where the Action Is	Local		Peter Jennings with the News 6:15: Local	Local
ABC	January	Local								Supermarket Sweep	The Dating Game	The Donna Reed Show (R)	Father Knows Best (R)	Ben Casey (R)		The Newlywed Game (In COLOR starting 4/3)	**Dream Girl of '67** (In COLOR starting 4/3) 2:55: News with the Woman's Touch	General Hospital	The Nurses	Dark Shadows	Where the Action Is	Local		Peter Jennings with the News (In COLOR starting 1/9)	Local
ABC	February	Local								Supermarket Sweep	The Dating Game	**Everybody's Talking**	The Donna Reed Show (R)	Ben Casey (R)		The Newlywed Game (In COLOR starting 4/3)	**Dream Girl of '67** (In COLOR starting 4/3) 2:55: News with the Woman's Touch	General Hospital	The Nurses	Dark Shadows	Where the Action Is	Local		Peter Jennings with the News (In COLOR starting 1/9)	Local
ABC	Spring	Local								Supermarket Sweep	**One in a Million**	**Everybody's Talking**	The Donna Reed Show (R)	**The Fugitive** (R)		The Newlywed Game (In COLOR starting 4/3)	**Dream Girl of '67** (In COLOR starting 4/3) 2:55: News with the Woman's Touch	General Hospital	Dark Shadows (In COLOR starting 8/11)	The Dating Game (In COLOR starting 4/3)	Local			Peter Jennings with the News (In COLOR starting 1/9)	Local
ABC	April	Local							**Dateline: Hollywood** 10:55: **The Children's Doctor**	Supermarket Sweep	**One in a Million**	**Everybody's Talking**	The Donna Reed Show (R)	**The Fugitive** (R)		The Newlywed Game (In COLOR starting 4/3)	**Dream Girl of '67** (In COLOR starting 4/3) 2:55: News with the Woman's Touch	General Hospital	Dark Shadows (In COLOR starting 8/11)	The Dating Game (In COLOR starting 4/3)	Local			Peter Jennings with the News (In COLOR starting 1/9)	Local
ABC	Summer	Local							**Dateline: Hollywood** 10:55: **The Children's Doctor**	**The Honeymoon Race** (In COLOR starting 7/17)	**The Family Game** (In COLOR starting 6/19)	**Everybody's Talking**	The Donna Reed Show (R)	**The Fugitive** (R)		The Newlywed Game (In COLOR starting 4/3)	**Dream Girl of '67** (In COLOR starting 4/3) 2:55: News with the Woman's Touch	General Hospital	Dark Shadows (In COLOR starting 8/11)	The Dating Game (In COLOR starting 4/3)	Local			Peter Jennings with the News (In COLOR starting 1/9)	Local
CBS		7:05: CBS Morning News In COLOR	Local	Captain Kangaroo (In COLOR starting 9/10)		Local		**Candid Camera** (R)	**The Beverly Hillbillies** (R)	Andy of Mayberry (R)	The Dick Van Dyke Show (R)	Love of Life 12:25: CBS News	12:30: Search for Tomorrow 12:45: The Guiding Light (In COLOR starting 3/11)	Local	As the World Turns (In COLOR starting 8/21)	Password (In COLOR starting 9/12)	Art Linkletter's House Party In COLOR	To Tell the Truth (In COLOR starting 12/5) 3:25: CBS News	The Edge of Night	The Secret Storm	Local				CBS Evening News In COLOR
NBC	Fall	Today In COLOR				Local		Eye Guess LIVE and In COLOR 10:25: NBC News	Concentration LIVE (In COLOR starting 11/7)	**The Pat Boone Show** (In COLOR starting 10/17)	**The Hollywood Squares** (In COLOR starting 10/17)	Jeopardy! In COLOR	Swinging Country In COLOR 12:55 pm: NBC News	Local	Let's Make a Deal In COLOR 1:55 pm: NBC News	Days of Our Lives In COLOR	The Doctors (In COLOR starting 9/12)	Another World LIVE and In COLOR	You Don't Say! In COLOR	The Match Game LIVE and In COLOR 4:25: NBC News	Local				The Huntley–Brinkley Report In COLOR
NBC	January	Today In COLOR				Local		**Reach for the Stars** LIVE and In COLOR 10:25 am: NBC News	Concentration LIVE (In COLOR starting 11/7)	**The Pat Boone Show** (In COLOR starting 10/17)	**The Hollywood Squares** (In COLOR starting 10/17)	Jeopardy! In COLOR	Eye Guess LIVE and In COLOR 12:55: NBC News	Local	Let's Make a Deal In COLOR 1:55 pm: NBC News	Days of Our Lives In COLOR	The Doctors (In COLOR starting 9/12)	Another World LIVE and In COLOR	You Don't Say! In COLOR	The Match Game LIVE and In COLOR 4:25: NBC News	Local				The Huntley–Brinkley Report In COLOR
NBC	Spring	Today In COLOR				Local		**Snap Judgment** In COLOR 10:25: NBC News	Concentration LIVE (In COLOR starting 11/7)	**The Pat Boone Show** (In COLOR starting 10/17)	**The Hollywood Squares** (In COLOR starting 10/17)	Jeopardy! In COLOR	Eye Guess LIVE and In COLOR 12:55: NBC News	Local	Let's Make a Deal In COLOR 1:55 pm: NBC News	Days of Our Lives In COLOR	The Doctors (In COLOR starting 9/12)	Another World LIVE and In COLOR	You Don't Say! In COLOR	The Match Game LIVE and In COLOR 4:25: NBC News	Local				The Huntley–Brinkley Report In COLOR
NBC	Summer	Today In COLOR				Local		**Snap Judgment** In COLOR 10:25: NBC News	Concentration LIVE (In COLOR starting 11/7)	**Personality** In COLOR	**The Hollywood Squares** (In COLOR starting 10/17)	Jeopardy! In COLOR	Eye Guess LIVE and In COLOR 12:55: NBC News	Local	Let's Make a Deal In COLOR 1:55 pm: NBC News	Days of Our Lives In COLOR	The Doctors (In COLOR starting 9/12)	Another World LIVE and In COLOR	You Don't Say! In COLOR	The Match Game LIVE and In COLOR 4:25: NBC News	Local				The Huntley–Brinkley Report In COLOR

- With the final daytime airing of Where The Action Is on March 31, 1967, ABC returned the 4:30 (ET)/3:30 (CT) timeslot to its affiliates, joining CBS and NBC in ending its daytime lineup after the aforementioned timeslot.

== Saturday ==
Network		6:00 am	6:30 am	7:00 am	7:30 am	8:00 am	8:30 am	9:00 am	9:30 am	10:00 am	10:30 am	11:00 am	11:30 am	noon	12:30 pm	1:00 pm	1:30 pm	2:00 pm	2:30 pm	3:00 pm	3:30 pm	4:00 pm	4:30 pm	5:00 pm	5:30 pm	6:00 pm	6:30 pm
ABC	Fall	Local								**The King Kong Show** In COLOR	The Beatles In COLOR	The New Casper Cartoon Show (R) In COLOR	The Magilla Gorilla Show (R)	The Bugs Bunny Show (R)	The Milton the Monster Show In COLOR	Hoppity Hooper In COLOR	The New American Bandstand 1967 (In COLOR starting 9/9)		ABC Sports In COLOR and/or local					Wide World of Sports In COLOR			Local
ABC	Winter	Local							The Porky Pig Show (R)	**The King Kong Show** In COLOR	The Beatles In COLOR	The New Casper Cartoon Show (R) In COLOR	The Milton the Monster Show In COLOR	The Bugs Bunny Show (R)	The Magilla Gorilla Show (R)	Hoppity Hooper In COLOR	The New American Bandstand 1967 (In COLOR starting 9/9)		ABC Sports In COLOR and/or local					Wide World of Sports In COLOR			Local
CBS		Local	Sunrise Semester	Local		Captain Kangaroo In COLOR		Mighty Mouse & The Mighty Heroes In COLOR	Underdog In COLOR	**Frankenstein Jr. and The Impossibles** In COLOR	**Space Ghost and Dino Boy** In COLOR	**The New Adventures of Superman** In COLOR	**The Lone Ranger** In COLOR	**The Road Runner Show** In **C****O****L****O****R**	**The Beagles** In COLOR	Tom and Jerry In COLOR	CBS Sports In COLOR and/or local										CBS Evening News In COLOR
NBC	Fall	Local						**The Super 6** In COLOR	The Atom Ant Show In COLOR	The Secret Squirrel Show In COLOR	**The Space Kidettes** In COLOR	**Cool McCool** In COLOR	The Jetsons (R)	Top Cat (R)	**The Smithsonian** In COLOR	**Animal Secrets** In COLOR	NBC Sports In COLOR and/or local										
NBC	Winter	Local						**The Super 6** In COLOR	The Atom Ant Show In COLOR	The Flintstones (R)	**The Space Kidettes** In COLOR	The Secret Squirrel Show In COLOR	The Jetsons (R)	Cool McCool In COLOR	**The Smithsonian** In COLOR	**Animal Secrets** In COLOR	NBC Sports In COLOR and/or local										
NBC	Spring	Local						**The Super 6** In COLOR	The Atom Ant Show In COLOR	The Flintstones (R)	**The Space Kidettes** In COLOR	The Secret Squirrel Show In COLOR	The Jetsons (R)	Cool McCool In COLOR	NBC Sports In COLOR and/or local												

== Sunday ==
Network		7:00 am	7:30 am	8:00 am	8:30 am	9:00 am	9:30 am	10:00 am	10:30 am	11:00 am	11:30 am	noon	12:30 pm	1:00 pm	1:30 pm	2:00 pm	2:30 pm	3:00 pm	3:30 pm	4:00 pm	4:30 pm	5:00 pm	5:30 pm	6:00 pm	6:30 pm
ABC	Fall	local programming					Linus the Lionhearted In COLOR	Beany and Cecil (R)	The Peter Potamus Show (R)	The Bullwinkle Show (R)	Discovery In COLOR	local programming		Directions	Issues and Answers	ABC Sports and/or local				The Porky Pig Show (R)	Tennessee Tuxedo and His Tales (R)	ABC Sports and/or local			
ABC	Winter	local programming					Beany and Cecil (R)	Linus the Lionhearted In COLOR	The Peter Potamus Show (R)	The Bullwinkle Show (R)	Discovery In COLOR	local programming		Directions	Issues and Answers	ABC Sports and/or local				The Porky Pig Show (R)	Tennessee Tuxedo and His Tales (R)	ABC Sports and/or local			
CBS	Fall	local programming						Lamp Unto My Feet	Look Up and Live	Camera Three	local programming		Face the Nation	NFL on CBS and/or local programming								To Tell the Truth	Ted Mack's Amateur Hour	The Twentieth Century	Local
CBS	Winter	local programming						Lamp Unto My Feet	Look Up and Live	Camera Three	local programming		Face the Nation	CBS Sports and/or local programming			CBS Sports Spectacular	CBS Sports and/or local programming					Ted Mack's Amateur Hour	**The 21st Century**	Local
CBS	Summer	local programming						Lamp Unto My Feet	Look Up and Live	Camera Three	local programming		Face the Nation	CBS Sports and/or local programming								I Love Lucy (R)	Ted Mack's Amateur Hour	**The 21st Century**	Local
NBC	Fall	local programming										Open Mind		Meet the Press	Frontiers of Faith / Eternal Light / Catholic Hour	Wild Kingdom	AFL on NBC and/or local						College Bowl	The Frank McGee Report In COLOR	The Bell Telephone Hour / Actuality Specials In COLOR (continued into primetime)
NBC	Winter	local programming										Open Mind		Meet the Press	Frontiers of Faith / Eternal Light / Catholic Hour	NBC Sports and/or local programming						Wild Kingdom	College Bowl	The Frank McGee Report In COLOR	The Bell Telephone Hour / Actuality Specials In COLOR (continued into primetime)
NBC	Summer	local programming										Open Mind		Meet the Press	Frontiers of Faith / Eternal Light / Catholic Hour	NBC Sports and/or local programming							Sportsman's Holiday	The Frank McGee Report In COLOR	The Smithsonian

== By network ==
=== ABC ===
Returning series:

- A Time for Us
- ABC News
- Ben Casey (reruns)
- Beany and Cecil
- The Bugs Bunny Show
- The Bullwinkle Show (reruns)
- Dateline:Hollywood
- Dark Shadows
- The Dating Game
- Discovery 1966-1967
- The Nurses (from CBS)
- The Donna Reed Show (reruns)
- Father Knows Best (reruns)
- General Hospital
- Issues and Answers
- Let's Make a Deal
- Linus the Lionhearted (from CBS)
- The Magilla Gorilla Show
- The Milton the Monster Show
- The New American Bandstand 1967
- The Beatles
- The New Casper Cartoon Show
- The Newlywed Game
- News with the Woman's Touch
- Peter Jennings with the News
- The Peter Potamus Show (reruns)
- The Porky Pig Show (reruns)
- Supermarket Sweep
- Tennessee Tuxedo and His Tales (reruns) (from CBS)
- Where the Action Is

New series:

- **Dream Girl of '67**
- **The Children's Doctor**
- **Everybody's Talking**
- **The Family Game**
- **The Fugitive** (reruns)
- **The Honeymoon Race**
- **The King Kong Show**
- **One in a Million**

**Not returning from 1965–66**

- Arlene Dahl's Beauty Spot
- It's Confidential For Women
- Never Too Young
- The Young Marrieds
- The Young Set
- Shenanigans

=== CBS ===
Returning series:

- Andy of Mayberry (reruns)
- Art Linkletter's House Party
- As the World Turns
- Camera Three
- Captain Kangaroo
- CBS Evening News
- CBS Morning News
- CBS News
- The Dick Van Dyke Show (reruns)
- The Edge of Night
- Face the Nation
- The Guiding Light
- Lamp Unto My Feet
- The Linkletter Show
- Look Up and Live
- Love of Life
- Mighty Mouse & The Mighty Heroes
- The NFL Today
- Password
- Search for Tomorrow
- The Secret Storm
- Sunrise Semester
- Ted Mack's Amateur Hour
- To Tell the Truth
- Tom and Jerry
- Underdog (moved from NBC)
- Where the Heart Is

New series:

- **The Beagles**
- **The Beverly Hillbillies** (reruns)
- **Candid Camera** (reruns)
- **Frankenstein Jr. and The Impossibles**
- **The Lone Ranger**
- **The New Adventures of Superman**
- **The Road Runner Show**
- **Space Ghost and Dino Boy**

**Not returning from 1965-66**

- I Love Lucy (reruns)
- The Real McCoys (reruns)
- The Heckle and Jeckle Cartoon Show
- Tennessee Tuxedo and His Tales (moved to ABC)
- Linus the Lionhearted (moved to ABC)
- The Quick Draw McGraw Show
- Sky King (reruns)
- Lassie (continued in primetime)
- My Friend Flicka (reruns)
- The CBS Saturday News

=== NBC ===
Returning series:

- Another World
- Another World in Bay City
- The Atom Ant/Secret Squirrel Show
- The Bell Telephone Hour / Actuality Specials (continues into Primetime)
- Concentration
- Cool McCool
- Days of Our Lives
- The Doctors
- Eye Guess
- The Flintstones reruns
- The Frank McGee Report
- Frontiers of Faith
- Hidden Faces
- Jeopardy!
- Let's Make a Deal
- The Match Game
- Meet the Press
- NBC News
- NBC Saturday Night News
- NBC Sunday Night News
- Today
- Top Cat reruns
- You Don't Say!
- Young Samson

New series:

- **Animal Secrets**
- **The Hollywood Squares**
- **Personality**
- **Reach for the Stars**
- **The Smithsonian**
- **Snap Judgment**
- **The Space Kidettes**
- **The Super 6**

**Not returning from 1965-66**

- Chain Letter
- Fractured Phrases
- Let's Play Post Office
- Morning Star
- Paradise Bay
- Showdown
- Swinging Country
- Underdog (Moved to CBS)
- Fury (reruns)
- The First Look
- Exploring

== See also ==
- 1966-67 United States network television schedule (prime-time)
- 1966-67 United States network television schedule (late night)

== Sources ==
- Castleman & Podrazik, The TV Schedule Book, McGraw-Hill Paperbacks, 1984
- TV schedules, **NEW YORK TIMES**, September 1966-September 1967 (microfilm)
