= Hanna–Barbera's World of Super Adventure =

Television series

- Directed by: William Hanna; Joseph Barbera
- Theme music composer: Hoyt Curtin
- Country of origin: United States
- Original language: English
- No. of episodes: 129

Production
- Executive producers: William Hanna; Joseph Barbera
- Running time: 30 minutes
- Production company: Hanna-Barbera Productions

Original release
- Network: First-run syndication
- Release: 1980 – 1984

Related
- Fred Flintstone and Friends; The Funtastic World of Hanna-Barbera

Hanna–Barbera's World of Super Adventure is a 30-minute animated anthology wheel series produced by Hanna-Barbera which was broadcast in first-run syndication from 1980 to 1984.

== Overview ==
The series was similar in scope to Hanna-Barbera's 1977–78 syndicated rerun anthology, Fred Flintstone and Friends. It was packaged together by Hanna-Barbera and featured a combination of the following seven Hanna-Barbera action-adventure Saturday morning cartoons that were originally broadcast by various networks:

- Birdman and the Galaxy Trio (1967–1968)
- The Fantastic Four (1967–1970)
- Frankenstein Jr. and The Impossibles (1966–1968)
- The Herculoids (1967–1968)
- Moby Dick and Mighty Mightor (1967–1969)
- Shazzan (1967–1969)
- Space Ghost and Dino Boy (1966–1968)

== Revivals ==
Space Stars was a new updated version of this packaged series that ran on NBC from 1981–1982 which showcased new episodes of Space Ghost and The Herculoids, as well as the new shows Teen Force and Astro and the Space Mutts. It never reached the level of popularity as Super Adventures and was canceled after only one season.

== Opening narration ==
The opening title narration for the original 1978 broadcast was provided by Stanley Jones and consisted of the following message:

Hanna–Barbera's World of Super Adventure featuring the most fantastic collection of spectacular super heroic stars ever assembled! They will take you on adventures in space, meeting strange creatures, to exotic lands and fantastic flights of fancy, to jungle planets and mysterious invaders, to prehistoric times and super forces, to modern winged avengers, to giant, terrifying creatures against primitive power. In space, land, sea and air, it's a variety of stars – mighty, musical, athletic, extraordinary – from funtastic to the fantastic where amazing weapons, men and robots meet in combat in the far-out reaches of the universe. Dedicated to protecting the peace, these fantastic heroes defend the weak, right the wrong and battle against the forces of evil everywhere. And now it's take-off time for the gathering of the greatest...Hanna–Barbera's World of Super Adventure!

== See also ==
- Fred Flintstone and Friends, another syndicated rerun anthology from Hanna-Barbera
- USA Cartoon Express, a cartoon block featuring many of these series
