= The Herculoids =

Animated television series

- Title card
- Genre: Science fiction
- Created by: Alex Toth
- Directed by: William Hanna; Joseph Barbera
- Voices of: Mike Road; Virginia Gregg; Teddy Eccles; Don Messick
- Composer: Ted Nichols
- Country of origin: United States
- No. of episodes: 18 (36 segments, 1967–1969); 11 (1981–1982)

Production
- Producers: William Hanna; Joseph Barbera
- Running time: 22 min. – two 11-min. segments (1967–1969); 6-min. segments of Space Stars (1981–1982)
- Production company: Hanna-Barbera Productions

Original release
- Network: CBS
- Release: September 9, 1967 – January 6, 1968

Related
- Space Stars

The Herculoids is an American Saturday-morning animated television series produced by Hanna-Barbera Productions, created and designed by Alex Toth. With plotlines rooted in science fiction and fantasy, the show debuted September 9, 1967, on CBS. While Hanna-Barbera produced one season for the initial airing, the original 18 episodes were rerun during the 1968–69 television season. Eleven new episodes were produced in 1981 as part of the Space Stars show.

== Plot ==
On the planet Amzot (renamed Quasar in the revival), the space barbarian family Zandor, Tara, and son Dorno fight alongside their giant pets—laser dragon Zok, space rhinoceros Tundro, rock ape Igoo, and the shape-shifting duo Gloop and Gleep—to keep their planet safe from invaders. The Herculoids' pets understood human speech and often displayed various emotions. The Herculoids team battled against many different villains: invading robots, mad scientists, and mutants, including "the Faceless People, Destroyer Ants, Raider Apes, Mutoids, Arnoids, Zorbots, the Mekkano mechanical men and the Ogs, a strange form of vegetable life."

Roughly contemporaneous to their own series premiere, the Herculoids made a crossover appearance in the Space Ghost episode "The Molten Monsters of Moltar". In the "Council of Doom" story arc while battling the combined might of all of his enemies, Space Ghost, Jan, Jace, and Blip meet a number of Hanna-Barbera heroes just as they were debuting in their own respective series. Along with the Herculoids were Shazzan, Moby Dick and the Mighty Mightor, the last two sharing one series.

== Characters ==
There are eight regular characters who make up the Herculoids:

=== The Herculoids ===
==== Humans ====
The three humans were the only ones who could speak English:

- Zandor (voiced by Mike Road) – The protector of Amzot/Quasar, and leader of The Herculoids.
- Tara (voiced by Virginia Gregg) – Zandor's wife.
- Dorno (voiced by Ted Eccles in the original series, Sparky Marcus in 1981) – Son of Zandor and Tara. Despite being their son, he still refers to them by their first names, rather than "Mother" and "Father". However, this changed in the 1980s revival of the series.

==== Creatures ====
The five creature characters of The Herculoids are:

- Zok (voiced by Mike Road) – A dragon with bat-like wings. He can emit laser beams from his eyes and tail and produce a "nega-beam" that neutralizes certain energy attacks. Zok can survive in space unaided, is capable of interstellar travel, and can also breathe fire.
- Igoo (voiced by Mike Road) – An ape who possesses dense, rock-like skin and is nearly invulnerable to harm. Igoo has a kind and gentle temperament, except when his loved ones or home are threatened, and displays great fondness of and devotion to Tara in particular.
- Tundro (voiced by Mike Road) – A ten-legged, four-horned rhinoceros/Triceratops hybrid. He is highly durable and can shoot explosive energy rocks from his horn. His legs can extend to a remarkable length, somewhat like stilts. He can also spin his head at blinding speed, allowing him to drill through solid rock, and has the ability to make magnificent leaps.
- Gloop and Gleep (both voiced by Don Messick) – Two protoplasmic creatures. They are able to absorb and deflect energy blasts and laser beams, often placing themselves between attackers and other Herculoids to act as shields. They also possess the ability to shape-shift which they have used in numerous ways, including transforming into cushions, trampolines, or parachutes to break falls; stretching themselves between tree limbs or rocks to act as slingshots; and binding an attacker's limbs to restrain them, or encircling their entire body to squeeze and render them unconscious. They can also momentarily divide their body mass into separate portions under their full control when necessary until they reunite.

=== Villains ===
The Herculoids faced off against two opponents twice:

- Pirate Captain (voiced by Vic Perrin) - The unnamed captain of a group of space pirates who fought the Herculoids in "The Pirates" and "Revenge of the Pirates".
- Sta-Lak - The leader of the a space-faring faction that fought the Herculoids in "The Raiders" and "Return of Sta-Lak".

== Production ==
After the success of Space Ghost, CBS' head of daytime programming, Fred Silverman, commissioned Hanna-Barbera to develop three new action-adventure series in the same vein for the 1967–68 fall schedule consisting of The Herculoids, Shazzan, and Moby Dick and Mighty Mightor. Silverman stated that the series faced an uphill battle due to being what he called "second generation" shows, repeats of the same idea (in this case, the formula established by Space Ghost) and being seen as derivatives that couldn't match the original. Joseph Barbera described The Herculoids as being of a similar mold to a Tom and Jerry short wherein a setup would be quickly established (usually a stranger needing help or a threat from an outside force) which would then lead to a serious of attacks and counterattacks in a manner not too dissimilar from a Tom and Jerry short's delivery of visual gags. During development, potential titles considered for the show were Zartan or Zandor before finally settling on The Herculoids. According to Barbera, The Herculoids achieved a then unheard of 60 share in the ratings beating the already impressive 55 share of Space Ghost the previous season which prompted Silverman not to order any further episodes of Space Ghost and instead pool support behind The Herculoids.

== Broadcast ==
The series was broadcast on CBS from September 9, 1967 through September 6, 1969. Beginning February 4, 1978, NBC rebroadcast the series by packaging it with Harlem Globetrotters and airing it under the package title of Go Go Globetrotters until September 2, 1978. On November 9, 1992, Cartoon Network aired the series as part of their Boomerang programming block dedicated to showcases of older cartoons.

== Legacy ==
After its initial run, The Herculoids was featured in several anthology wheel series produced by Hanna-Barbera including Hanna–Barbera's World of Super Adventure, Space Stars (for which 11 additional episodes were created), Power Zone on Cartoon Network, and both the Cartoon Network and Boomerang incarnations of Super Adventures. The series has also influenced other artists across various media. In common with a number of other action-adventure cartoons from the 1960s, The Herculoids was pulled from reruns in the 1970s due to increased complaints by parents' groups over perceived violence in children's cartoons.

Award-winning video game designer David Crane has stated that he enjoyed the series as a child and that the character of Blobert from the A Boy and His Blob franchise was directly inspired by Gloop and Gleep. Jamaican-American DJ DJ Kool Herc at one time employed a backing band which also drew its name from the show, fictionalized versions of which appear in the Netflix period series The Get Down.

== Episodes ==
=== Original series ===
Each show featured two Herculoids episodes.

No.	Title	Original release date
1a	"The Pirates"	September 9, 1967
After killing two creatures with a treasure chest, a crew of space pirates bury it on Amzot. When the Herculoids approach, Dorno is captured and held hostage.
1b	"Sarko the Arkman"	September 9, 1967
Sarko (pronounced Arko in this episode) captures Igoo for unknown reasons, attacks Zandor with sleeping gas, and captures Dorno and Tundro as well.
2a	"The Pod Creatures"	September 16, 1967
An alien spacecraft hovers over Amzot, dropping mechanical pods onto the planet. Meanwhile, Dorno, Igoo and Gleep, on a mission to get firewood, see the robotic pod creatures as the pods open up and start attacking the trio.
2b	"Mekkor"	September 16, 1967
A group of powerful robots, led by a larger robot, attack the Herculoids.
3a	"The Beaked People"	September 23, 1967
Krokar, leader of the parrot-liked Beaked People, stages an invasion on the Winged Monkeys, purposely letting one escape so he can capture Zandor and rule Amzot after sending him down the River of Peril and over the Bottomless Falls. Note: This was the only episode in the 1967 version where Dorno refers to Zandor and Tara as Dad and Mom; even in this episode Dorno reverts to calling Zandor by his name. In the 1981 revival series, Dorno refers to Zandor and Tara as Father and Mother.
3b	"The Raiders"	September 23, 1967
Sta-Lak (then unnamed) flew over Amzot. Upon seeing Zandor and Zok, Sta-Lak turned his ship invisible to avoid detection, with the intent of taking Tara prisoner.
4a	"The Mole Men"	September 30, 1967
After being woken up by a bird, Zandor investigates Marcon and the Mole Men's plans to invade the surface world, saving a condemned prisoner in the process. Meanwhile, other Mole Men are attacking the Herculoids.
4b	"The Lost Dorgyte"	September 30, 1967
Zandor rescues a young boy from a vulture. The Herculoids then take the boy back to his heavily-shadowed home because he cannot live in sunlight. The insect-looking creatures attack the Herculoids on their way out.
5a	"The Spider Men"	October 7, 1967
A group of spider-like creatures kidnap Dorno, then try doing the same with Tara. Gloop saves her while Gleep blows a horn beckoning the Herculoids to action. Zandor briefly frees Dorno with his shield but is soon captured with Dorno. After a stalemate, Zandor calls the Herculoids to action for one concentrated attack. Note: This was the first time that the Herculoids were referred to by name within the episode.
5b	"The Android People"	October 7, 1967
Zandor was captured by Gorvac, leader of the Android People, and created a giant evil clone of Zandor with plans to create an army of Zandor clones.
6a	"Defeat of Ogron"	October 14, 1967
Andropon and his robots invade Amzot where the Herculoids easily defeat them. After Andropon continuously threatens to build replacement robot armies (and Zandor continuously vows to defeat said armies), Andropon pits his top warrior Ogron against Zandor and Zok.
6b	"Prisoners of the Bubblemen"	October 14, 1967
Brotak and his Bubblemen kidnap Zandor and Tara for the purpose of using them in scientific experiments.
7a	"Mekkano, the Machine Master"	October 21, 1967
Trained machines break Mekkano out of an intergalactic prison, where he vows to destroy the ones who put him in prison: Zandor and the Herculoids.
7b	"Tiny World of Terror"	October 21, 1967
Torrak shrinks the Herculoids down to microscopic size for the purpose of destroying them with his super-powered microorganisms and then enslaving the galaxy.
8a	"The Gladiators of Kyanite"	October 28, 1967
After destroying the last wild creature of Kyanite, Neron and his gladiators capture Tundro. Zandor and Zok, followed by the rest of the Herculoids, arrive at the arena to rescue Tundro and fight the gladiators.
8b	"Temple of Trax"	October 28, 1967
The unnamed high priest of Trax kidnaps Tara in order to use her as a sacrifice for the idol Trax, cutting off the Herculoids in their rescue attempt. Can Zandor and Zok, who are miles away, get to Trax in time?
9a	"The Time Creatures"	November 4, 1967
Oton, leader of the Time Creatures, has determined that in order to rule Amzot in the future, he has to change its past, starting with destroying the Herculoids and altering time in his favor.
9b	"The Raider Apes"	November 4, 1967
Gotron and his Raider Apes burn a village in search of gold. The Herculoids come to the villagers' aid.
10a	"The Zorbots"	November 11, 1967
A terrible windstorm is raging on Amzot. However, Zandor notices that winds on the left side of a canyon are aiming right, while winds travel in the opposite direction on the right side. Zandor and the Herculoids investigate, and discover Konar is destroying Amzot's atmosphere to replace it with his own. Konar sends his henchmen, who are either killed or injured by the Herculoids. As Zandor confronts Konar, Konar brings out the giant Zorbots to take on the Herculoids. Zandor chooses to surrender in order to destroy the wind machine from within and, when successful, battle the Zorbots.
10b	"Invasion of the Electrode Men"	November 11, 1967
Volton and his Electrode Men fly into a volcanic crater, setting up a dome headquarters to take over Amzot. The Herculoids are easily defeating them until Volton takes Tara and Dorno prisoner. Zandor and the Herculoids have to wait until nightfall, when the Electrode Men's power is weakened. Thanks to Zandor's tactic that involves freeing Tara and Zorno, Zok sees that Zandor has reached the required distance with Tara and Dorno and follows his instructions to fire his beam at the nearby dam. This sends water towards Volton's ship causing it to emerge and flee Amzot.
11a	"Destroyer Ants"	November 18, 1967
A lightning storm causes a nest of giant ant eggs to hatch. The giant ants cause havoc and destruction and Zandor and the Herculoids must put an end to them.
11b	"Swamp Monster"	November 18, 1967
A hideous monster emerges from a swamp and goes on a rampage, destroying anything it comes in contact with by its radioactive touch. It eventually traps Dorno and Gleep in a cave, and it is up to Zandor and the rest of the Herculoids to rescue them and defeat the creature.
12a	"Mission of the Amatons"	November 25, 1967
Amak and the Amatons come to Amzot and place control collars on some animals. When their efforts to enslave the Herculoids fail, Amak tries to kill them. Gloop and Gleep save the day by turning Amak's stun turret on him, causing his ship to crash.
12b	"Queen Skorra"	November 25, 1967
Queen Skorra unleashes a mud/lava creature which the Herculoids eventually defeat, but Skorra plans to force them into exile by sending her drones to capture Gleep, Gloop, Tara, and Dorno. They defend themselves long enough for Zandor and the others to return and drive off the drones. Skorra launches a mega-shield missile and closes the mega-circle to destroy everyone, but Tundro creates a smokescreen while the others make a tunnel to escape and then send Skorra running.
13a	"Laser Lancers"	December 2, 1967
The story starts with Zandor knocked out by the Laser Lancers and the Herculoids coming to the rescue. Magoth and the Lancers send a new wave of attackers which the Herculoids repel, but it is a ploy to take Dorno and Tara hostage. With Gleep's help, they seal off the tunnel the Lancers used to sneak up and repel them once and for all.
13b	"Attack of the Faceless People"	December 2, 1967
The princess Serena of the Sun People arrives on Amzot, being pursued by Darkon of the Faceless People. Darkon wants Serena so he can control her people. The Herculoids successfully drive him off, but not before he captures Tara. Zandor agrees to a trade, but substitutes a berobed Gleep for Serena and they destroy Darkon's palace from the inside.
14a	"The Mutoids"	December 9, 1967
A ship crash-lands on Amzot with a sole occupant on board. Zandor offers assistance and the passenger turns out to be a Mutoid, a race who can change their appearance to anything. The Mutoids plan to use Amzot as a launching site for their missiles to fool their enemies. Can Zandor and the Herculoids stop them in time?
14b	"The Crystallites"	December 9, 1967
A meteor crash-lands on Azmot and transforms into a giant crystalline object. Zandor investigates and is attacked by the Crystallites, while Tara and Dorno are captured in crystal cells. Zandor, Gloop, and Gleep steal uniforms sneak into the fortress and free Dorno and Tara. Gloop and Zok destroy Kryton's ship and he is defeated.
15a	"Return of Sta-Lak"	December 16, 1967
Sta-Lak returns to Amzot seeking vengeance and equipped with robot duplicates of Igoo, Zok, and Tundro. He captures Dorno, Tara and Zandor and the others are forced to go into his volcano lair. The robot duplicates prove no match to the originals, even though the robot Igoo can spin at high speeds and has multiple arms, and the robot Tundro can fly. Sta-Lak enters a bubble and flees into a volcanic lava hole.
15b	"Revenge of the Pirates"	December 16, 1967
The space pirate captain and his crew from "The Pirates" return. Using an image transmitter, the captain immobilizes Zandor and the Herculoids and takes Dorno and Tara prisoner. Zok uses his neutralizing eye beams to free them, then Gloop finds the real Dorno and Tara from the transmitted images and the Herculoids launch a new assault. The captain tries to escape, but Gloop blocks his escape missile tube, causing the ship to explode.
16a	"Ruler of the Reptons"	December 23, 1967
Tara is captured by the Reptons, who place her in a mind control device to make her their evil queen. She orders her people to destroy Zandor and the Herculoids, who beat them and go to rescue Tara. The Reptons send the Destructo Bats after them, but they escape, recover Tara, free her from the machine's influence, and destroy the Reptons' underground lair.
16b	"The Antidote"	December 23, 1967
While investigating panic among the Monkey People, Zandor confronts a giant spider and is bitten and poisoned. Dorno must go to the six-legged mustachioed Spider People within the Endless Caves with the Herculoids to get the only known antidote. The Spider People capture Dorno to hold him hostage. The Herculoids eventually stage a rescue, get the antidote, and block the Spider People's caves to cover their escape.
17a	"Attack from Space"	December 30, 1967
Amzot is being bombarded by the planet Luvanuum. Zaygot and his henchmen are trying to destroy Azmot. The Herculoids travel to Luvanuum in a ship captured from Sarco. When they land, their ship is destroyed and they are attacked by winged sentries with deadly laser beams. The Herculoids destroy Zaygot's base and he escapes—they use Zaygot's ship to return to Amzot.
17b	"The Return of Torrak"	December 30, 1967
Torrak returns and sends out a giant fly to capture Tara. The Herculoids follow and discover that Torrak's warrior microorganisms are now larger and more formidable, but defeat them anyway.
18a	"The Island of the Gravites"	January 6, 1968
Zandor and Dorno rescue a man floating in the river who says he is from Gravite Island and tells them that a villain has taken over the island. The Herculoids go to investigate and are attacked by giant gravite creatures. The creatures are being created by Lotak, who wants the village because of its large deposits of gravite. Zok destroys the machine Lotak uses to make his creatures and Lotak is destroyed when his energy ray backfires.
18b	"Malak and the Metal Apes"	January 6, 1968
Malak sends his Metal Apes to attack the Sea People. Dorno is shot off of Zok by one of the creatures. Zandor and the Herculoids destroy the Metal Apes. A damaged Metal Ape returns to Malak's headquarters and is followed by the Herculoids. The Herculoids destroy the remaining Metal Apes and Zok causes a steel beam to fall on Malak and his assistant.

=== Space Stars revival ===
No.	Title	Original release date
1	"The Ice Monster"	September 12, 1981
Dorno is feeling depressed when Zandor treats him like a child because of his size and age. Meanwhile, an ancient indestructible robotic monster emerges from a block of ice.
2	"The Purple Menace"	September 19, 1981
Glowing purple rocks have brought to life purple vines which cause havoc.
3	"The Firebird"	September 26, 1981
A volcano erupts, revealing a firebird who has taken up residency in the volcano's crater and threatens the Herculoids.
4	"The Energy Creature"	October 3, 1981
A meteorite containing an energy creature lands on Quasar. When it imprisons creatures in its coils, it takes on their forms and properties also.
5	"The Snake Riders"	October 10, 1981
Dorno and Gleep discover a plot by the Snake Riders to take over the planet. The Herculoids must stop their plans for planetary conquest.
6	"The Buccaneer"	October 17, 1981
The Buccaneer and his band of space pirates arrive on Quasar to look for buried treasure.
7	"The Thunderbolt"	October 24, 1981
Saiju, a creature with a voracious appetite, comes upon some electrically-charged rocks and mutates into a living electrical monster after eating them. The Herculoids learn that the effects of those rocks are temporary and try to revert Saiju to normal.
8	"Return of the Ancients"	October 31, 1981
The descendants/survivors of a highly-developed race that was wiped out on Quasar return to the planet after a 1,000-year absence, and they are not too happy to find out that their civilization is gone.
9	"Space Trappers"	November 7, 1981
The Space Trappers arrive on Quasar and capture the Herculoids for their intergalactic circus.
10	"The Invisibles"	November 14, 1981
A chunk of magnilite that Space Ghost, Jan, Jace, and Blip have been chasing lands in the Lost Lake of Quasar. Before long, the Herculoids go up against enemies that they cannot see. Zandor soon learns from the Zelos King Zel that his son Eezo and his followers might be the culprits.
11	"Mindbender"	November 21, 1981
While playing, Dorno, Gloop, and Gleep discover and unearth a metal cylinder which contains a big-brained alien. When they release him, he reveals himself to be a member of a race that ruled Quasar thousands of years ago. The Herculoids try to recapture the Mindbender.

== Voices ==
- Ted Eccles as Dorno (1967-1968)
- Virginia Gregg as Tara
- Sparky Marcus as Dorno (1981)
- Don Messick as Gleep, Gloop
- Mike Road as Zandor, Zok, Igoo, Tundro

=== Additional voices ===
- Paul Frees as Sarko (in "Sarko the Arkman")
- Vic Perrin as Pirate Captain (in "The Pirates", "Revenge of the Pirates"), Mekkor (in "Mekkor")

== The Herculoids in other languages ==
- French: Les Défenseurs interplanétaires
- Chinese: 宇宙泰山 The show was introduced by ATV in Hong Kong as "宇宙泰山" in traditional Chinese or Cantonese, which stands for Tarzan in Space or Universe.
- Italian: Gli Erculoidi
- Portuguese: Os Herculóides
- Spanish: Los Defensores Interplanetarios (The Interplanetary Defenders) or Spanish: Los Herculoides (The Herculoids)
- Hungarian: A Herkuloidák
- Japanese: 怪獣王ターガン Kaijû Ô Tâgan (Monster King Targan)

- The characters' names in Japan were Targan (Zandor), Marmi (Tara), Kane (Dorno), Maryû (Zok), Rikira (Igoo), Tangurô (Tundro), Hyûhyû (Gloop) and Bôbô (Gleep).

- Welsh: Sandor. The cartoon was dubbed into Welsh and transmitted during Yr Awr Fawr (The Big Hour) on Sunday mornings. Originally shown on BBC2 Wales and then BBC1 Wales in the late 1970s and 1980s, this was before the introduction of the Welsh-language channel S4C in 1982.

== Home media ==
On June 14, 2011, Warner Archive released The Herculoids: The Complete Series on DVD in Region 1 as part of their Hanna-Barbera Classics Collection. This is a Manufacture-on-Demand (MOD) release, available exclusively through Warner's online store and Amazon.com.

On July 27, 2021, the complete series was released on Blu-ray. The Blu-ray includes the opening narration and the second-season alternate titles that were not released on the Complete Series DVD.

== In other media ==
=== Television ===
Several episodes of Space Ghost Coast to Coast mention or show the Herculoids. In "Lawsuit", Space Ghost mentions the Herculoids' planet. In the episode "Sequel", he goes to their planet and refers to it as a "rotten hippie monster commune" after they demand he leaves while pelting him with stones.

Gloop is featured prominently and is mentioned by name in the Sealab 2021 episode "Hail, Squishface".

Gloop and Gleep make several guest appearances on Harvey Birdman, Attorney at Law as well. They make cameo appearances in the episodes "Mindless" and "Juror in Court". Zok makes an appearance in "Peanut Puberty", where Phil Ken Sebben throws a graph chart at him. In the episode "Beyond the Valley of the Dinosaurs", Phil is attacked by Tundro. In "Evolutionary War", Tara appears on the evolution chart in between Fred Flintstone and Race Bannon.

Tundro and Gloop appear in the Family Guy episode "8 Simple Rules for Buying My Teenage Daughter", where Tundro attacks Lois Griffin in retaliation for Lois not hiring Gloop as a babysitter.

Igoo, Gloop, and Gleep make minor appearances in Jellystone!. The Herculoids appear in the third season finale "Marinara Madness" with Zandor voiced by Maxwell Atoms, Tara voiced by Niccole Thurman, Domo voiced by C.H. Greenblatt, Igoo and Gleep voiced by Fajer Al-Kaisi, Tundro voiced by Jeff Bergman, and Gloop voiced by Ulka Simone Mohanty. They are portrayed as hillbillies who run a tomatoroid farm located at the edge of nowhere and is some distance from Jellystone where the farm's highly-regarded marinara sauce was made.

=== Film ===
Igoo, Gloop and Gleep make cameo appearances in Space Jam: A New Legacy. They are among the Warner Bros. 3000 Server-Verse inhabitants who watch the basketball game between the Tune Squad and the Goon Squad.

=== Comic books ===
Super TV Heroes #1 (1968) and Cartoon Network Presents #17 (1999), featuring the Herculoids on their covers

The Herculoids have appeared in various comic books through the years. They appear in issues #1–2 and 4–7 of the Gold Key Comics series Hanna-Barbera Super TV Heroes (1968–69). They appear in issue #3 of the Marvel Comics series TV Stars (1978). Between 1997 and 1999, they appear in issues #5, 9, 13 and 17 of the DC Comics series Cartoon Network Presents.

In 2016, the Herculoids play a major role in the DC Comics series Future Quest. This series features characters from various Hanna-Barbera animated series such as Jonny Quest, Space Ghost, Birdman and the Galaxy Trio, Frankenstein Jr. and The Impossibles, and Moby Dick and Mighty Mightor. They also featured in issues #9–11 of the spin-off title, Future Quest Presents, in a story written by Rob Williams and illustrated by Aaron Lopresti.

In 2024, it was announced a Herculoids comic from Dynamite Entertainment is in the works. The first issue was published in February 2025. A crossover with Space Ghost will be published in September 2025.

== See also ==
- Space Stars
- List of works produced by Hanna-Barbera Productions
- List of Hanna-Barbera characters
