= The Fantastic Four (1967 TV series) =

American animated television series

- Genre: Superhero; Action; Adventure
- Based on: Fantastic Four by: Stan Lee; Jack Kirby
- Written by: Phil Hahn; Jack Hanrahan
- Directed by: William Hanna; Joseph Barbera
- Voices of: Gerald Mohr; Jo Ann Pflug; Jac Flounders; Paul Frees
- Theme music composer: Ted Nichols
- Composer: Ted Nichols
- Country of origin: United States
- No. of seasons: 1
- No. of episodes: 20

Production
- Producers: William Hanna; Joseph Barbera
- Running time: 22 minutes
- Production companies: Hanna-Barbera Productions; Marvel Comics Group

Original release
- Network: ABC
- Release: September 9, 1967 – September 21, 1968

Related
- The Fantastic Four (1978)

The Fantastic Four is an American animated television series produced by Hanna-Barbera Productions and based on the Marvel Comics superhero team of the same name. The program, featuring character designs by Alex Toth, originally aired on Saturday mornings on ABC from September 9, 1967, to September 21, 1968. It lasted for 20 episodes, with repeat episodes airing on ABC for three years until the network cancelled the program. It was also rerun as part of the continuing series Hanna–Barbera's World of Super Adventure.

The show was followed by another Fantastic Four cartoon produced by DePatie–Freleng Enterprises, The New Fantastic Four, in 1978.

== Plot ==
In the show, the super-family go on many adventures. They cross paths with various figures and have battles against their comic book rogues, including Dr. Doom, the Mole Man, Galactus and Diablo.

== Voice cast ==
=== Credited cast ===
The Fantastic Four

- Gerald Mohr - Mister Fantastic / Reed Richards
- Jo Ann Pflug - Invisible Girl / Susan Storm Richards
- Paul Frees - The Thing / Benjamin J. Grimm, Uatu the Watcher, Skrull Emperor (in "Behold a Distant Star"), King Tok (in "The Micro World of Dr. Doom"), Impostor (in "The Deadly Director"), Additional Voices
- Jac Flanders - Human Torch / Johnny Storm

=== Notable guest stars ===
- Tol Avery - Warlord Morrat (in "Behold a Distant Star")
- Ted Cassidy - Galactus (in "Galactus")
- Henry Corden - Molecule Man, Attuma (in "Danger in the Depths")
- Regis Cordic - Diablo (in "Diablo")
- Jack DeLeon - Mole Man
- Frank Gerstle - Blastaar
- Don Messick - Kurrgo (in "Prisoners of Planet X"), Skrull Emperor (in "Invasion of the Super Skrulls")
- Marvin Miller - Super-Skrull (in "Invasion of the Super Skrulls"), Emperor (in "The Micro World of Dr. Doom")
- Vic Perrin - Red Ghost, Professor Gamma/The Gamma Ray (in "Demon in the Deep"), Silver Surfer (in "Galactus")
- Mike Road - Prince Triton (in "Danger in the Depths"), Pharaoh Rama-Tut (in "Rama-Tut")
- Joseph Sirola - Dr. Doom
- Hal Smith - Klaw, Judge (in "The Terrible Tribunal"), Otto Von Lenz (in "The Deadly Director")
- Ginny Tyler - Anelle (in "Behold a Distant Star")
- Janet Waldo - Lady Dorma (in "Danger in the Depths"), Princess Perla (in "The Micro World of Dr. Doom")

== Production ==
Grantray-Lawrence Animation had originally wanted Fantastic Four for a segment on The Marvel Super Heroes, but Marvel Comics decided not to sell them the rights. The impetus for The Fantastic Four series began when Hanna-Barbera's agent, Sy Fischer, noticed his son reading a Fantastic Four comic book. Fischer asked him if he would be interested in seeing it turned into a Saturday morning cartoon. Upon confirming his son's interest, Fischer took the idea to Joseph Barbera who read the comic himself and agreed that it would translate well as a cartoon. The two soon contacted Stan Lee at Marvel Comics to discuss their interest. After acquiring the rights, Barbera and Fischer successfully pitched the series to ABC for the 1967 TV season.

== Episodes ==
No.	Title	Original release date	Prod. code
2	"Menace of the Mole Men"	September 9, 1967	1
The Fantastic Four are off to carry out their experiments on a remote island. The Mole Man, however, has been waiting for them and traps them in a radiation field and plans to submerge the world's largest cities. The Fantastic Four escape, but the Mole Man traps them again. They manage to escape in separate ways. They successfully foil Mole Man's domination and escape the island once and for all.
3	"Diablo"	September 16, 1967	2
In Transylvania, the Fantastic Four find a ruined castle. Ben is summoned by Diablo and unable to resist, opens Diablo's prison, unleashing him and later brainwashing Ben. Diablo tricks the world into thinking he has the power to help them. The world then realizes what a fraud Diablo really is. The Fantastic Four seize this opportunity to attack Diablo's castle. After getting far in the dungeons, the four get captured. Ben escapes, releases the others, and they defeat Diablo while re-imprisoning him.
7	"The Way It All Began"	September 23, 1967	3
Dr. Doom arrives in New York City wanting diplomatic immunity. In the presence of the Fantastic Four and the police commissioner, Reed recalls the time he first met Victor before he became Dr. Doom. Victor was working on a dangerous experiment that brought him to the hospital, got him expelled from university, and badly disfigured his face as he swore revenge on Reed. Ben and Reed became soldiers in WWII. Ben, Susan, Johnny and Reed all went aboard a space rocket for space exploration. And so the origin of the Fantastic Four began when they each got their powers. Dr. Doom then confronts the Fantastic Four and briefs them on his origin that involved him being found by monks in Tibet that provide him his armor. Following that recap, Dr. Doom attempts to get his revenge. He fails and escapes only to crash. While the police commissioner suspects that it would be the end of Dr. Doom, Reed states that he is uncertain about that.
5	"Invasion of the Super Skrulls"	September 30, 1967	4
The Skrulls have failed to destroy the Fantastic Four. They introduce The Super-Skrull who possesses the powers of the Fantastic Four. The Fantastic Four are overwhelmed by the Super-Skrull's combined powers. The Fantastic Four lure the Super-Skrull to Crater Island. Susan plants a sonic wave jamming device on the Super-Skrull before he can destroy them with his ultimate power level. Notes: Based on Fantastic Four #18.
1	"Klaws"	October 7, 1967	5a
Klaw is here to vanquish the Fantastic Four with his solidifying sonic waves. Johnny is on vacation or so it would seem and arrives in the nick of time to assist Mr. Fantastic in catching The Klaw. Notes: Based on Fantastic Four #56.
4	"The Red Ghost"	October 7, 1967	5b
Reed is competing with Dr. Kragoff in racing to the moon for astronomical research. During the launch, Dr. Kragoff and his primate crew have developed some reverse energy powers. Dr. Kragoff is now transparent. Dr. Kragoff kidnaps Susan after counter attacking. She escapes and thwarts Dr. Kragoff's attempt to eliminate her companions. Using a special device, Reed turns Dr. Kragoff into a plastic statue.
9	"Prisoners of Planet X"	October 14, 1967	6
A UFO abducts the Fantastic Four from the Science Centre to Planet X. There, their dictator Kurrgo requests the Fantastic Four save their planet from another planet knocked off its orbit. Kurrgo even assigns one of his robots to keep an eye on them. Reed manages to formulate a working plan to save the population. While the plan is in process, Kurrgo has other ideas. However, Reed tricks Kurrgo and leaves him on the doomed planet while the micro-sized population, the Fantastic Four, and a defeated robot get away to safety. Notes: Based on Fantastic Four #7.
14	"It Started on Yancy Street"	October 21, 1967	7
The Fantastic Four face a bunch of old rivals in Yancy Street, but their old enemy Dr. Kragoff and his primates show up and capture them. During their voyage to the moon, the four turn the tables, but Dr. Kragoff gets away and the four are dumped on the moon. They barely manage to get to a source of oxygen, which is Uatu the Watcher's laboratory. Using one of the Watcher's machines, Reed brings down Dr. Kragoff's ship. Susan gets Dr. Kragoff banished into a transnitron machine. Reed uses that machine to get back to Earth.
6	"Three Predictions of Dr. Doom"	October 28, 1967	8
Dr. Doom challenges the Fantastic Four. Doctor Doom begins his plans by capturing Susan. Soon, the Fantastic Four manage to locate and penetrate Dr. Doom's flying fortress, but Ben is turned back to his former self and the other three are trapped. Ben turns himself back into the Thing, releases the others and aborts Dr. Doom's tidal waves. They chase Dr. Doom out and back to the flying fortress. After a struggle through the dangerous complex of the fortress, they abort Dr. Doom's global destruction for good.
8	"Behold a Distant Star"	November 4, 1967	9
The Fantastic Four are testing their rocket when they are drawn into the Skrull Galaxy. After beating the first round of Skrulls, the Fantastic Four become weak and are taken prisoner. The cruel Skrull Warlord Morrat wishes to overthrow the Skrull Emperor. The Warlord gives the Fantastic Four the option to assist them or die. Reed tricks Warlord Morrat into getting him and his friends' powers fully charged. They defeat Warlord Morrat as the Skrull Emperor arrives. The Skrull Emperor allows the Fantastic Four to go freely back to Earth as he plans to deal with Warlord Morrat later.
12	"Demon in the Deep"	November 11, 1967	10
The Fantastic Four successfully beat the criminal forces working for Dr. Gamma, and blow up the island with its secret weapons. While escaping, Dr. Gamma is infected by the radiation levels in the seabed and morphs into some creature. Johnny is flustered with being moved around and quits from the Fantastic Four. In the town Johnny goes to, there have been sightings of the Gamma Ray. Johnny defeats the Gamma Ray by himself, but he comes back with the hideous giant sperm whale-like sea monster Giganto. Johnny rejoins the Fantastic Four. Ben succeeds in eliminating the sea monster. The Gamma Ray is defeated but not finished.
11	"Danger in the Depths"	November 18, 1967	11
Johnny finds Lady Dorma and takes her back to the Headquarters. She claims to have come from a land beneath the sea called Pacifica, which is under siege by Attuma. They manage to slip past Attuma's forces. Pacifica is losing hope and Attuma has shadowed the seabed. Triton can only fight man-to-man with Attuma while his men prepare traps to weaken Triton into a losing battle. The Fantastic Four thwart every trap. Triton beats Attuma and the forces retreat. Notes: Based on Fantastic Four #33.
13	"Return of the Moleman"	November 25, 1967	12
The Mole Man is creating earthquakes and causing buildings to sink deep into the Earth. In addition, he and his Moloids kidnap Susan after sinking a building she was in. The Mole Man as usual has been expecting the other three and sends them back to the surface to tell the Army not to get involved. They manage to halt them and seek an alternate entrance in the underworld. Johnny rescues Susan, then they penetrate the laboratory. They all return the buildings to the surface and escape the exploding caves.
19	"Rama-Tut"	December 9, 1967	13
After coming back from vacation, Reed tells Ben an interesting theory on attempting to restore him. They head to Dr. Doom's deserted castle to use the time machine that Dr. Doom left behind. In 2000 B.C, the four are weakened during a fight and are taken by Pharaoh and fellow time traveller Pharaoh Rama-Tut. Susan is to be Rama-Tut's queen while the other three are put to work with some mind control. Ben turns back to his former self. As he rescues Susan he is once again the Thing. The four battle Rama-Tut to his sphinx. Finally, they destroy his sphinx and return to their own time.
15	"Galactus"	December 16, 1967	14
The Watcher fails to prevent the Silver Surfer from coming and summoning Galactus. Susan assists the unconscious Surfer and he begins to think differently. The Watcher has a plan only Johnny can undergo. Reed and Ben sabotage Galactus' Earth-draining machine and the Silver Surfer arrives to battle Galactus. Johnny gets back with the weapon that makes Galactus see reason not to destroy the Earth. Notes: Based on Fantastic Four #48-50.
16	"The Micro World of Dr. Doom"	December 30, 1967	15
The Fantastic Four have been shrunken to small size. Dr. Doom is after them and takes them to the Micro World. Dr. Doom briefs them on his micro genius experiments involving a king and a princess from the micro world. The four battle the giant guards, but Dr. Doom catches them and imprisons them with the King and Princess. They all escape and enlarge themselves. Ben puts a stop to the Lizard Men and then the Fantastic Four return to their own world. Notes: Based on Fantastic Four #16.
17	"Blastaar, the Living Bomb-Burst"	January 6, 1968	16
On a remote planet, its inhabitants are fighting against Blastaar and are able to banish him. Reed and Johnny enter the dangerous space zone via dimensional transport. As they depart, Blastaar escapes and follows them. Blastaar is too powerful for the four to handle. They lure Blastaar into an evacuated atomic power plant, where they use some atomic matter to put him in a coma. They eject him through the dimensional transport back into the space zone. Notes: Based on Fantastic Four #63.
10	"The Mysterious Molecule Man"	January 13, 1968	17
The Fantastic Four study a radiated meteor. Molecule Man appears and threatens the public. After the Fantastic Four tastes some of his power, he leaves to undergo his ruling the world. Reed has developed a weapon he thinks will defeat the Molecule Man. The weapon works, but the Molecule Man gets away. The Fantastic Four continue their pursuit. The plan to stop the Molecule Man is tricky. They manage to reverse the Molecule Man's form with a fragment of the meteor. Notes: Based on Fantastic Four #20.
18	"The Terrible Tribunal"	September 14, 1968	18
The Fantastic Four are taken to another planet where they are regarded as criminals against evil, charged by three old enemies. Reed is forced to recall his memories on Klaw, Molecule Man and Blastaar's defeat. Meanwhile, the other three escape and they rescue Reed just as the verdict is given. At the surface, they have to battle the court judge before they are able to leave the planet for Earth.
20	"The Deadly Director"	September 21, 1968	19
The Imposter plans to lure the Fantastic Four into a trap by posing as a famous Hollywood director. The four are tempted to be in a movie and briefly retell their previous adventures to the director. The next day, the four fly to the director's island and the director blows them out of the sky. The Fantastic Four are forced to go through the director's deadly movie landscapes and make it to the boat on the other side of the island which the director detonates. The Imposter removes his disguise and the Fantastic Four surprise him. The real director prevents the Imposter from escaping as the Imposter forgot that the room he was escaping into is where he trapped the real director.

== Broadcast ==
The series was broadcast on ABC from September 9, 1967 through August 30, 1970. Beginning October 3, 1992, Cartoon Network began airing the series as part of their Boomerang programming block dedicated to showcases of older cartoons until October 1996.

== Reception ==
In The Encyclopedia of American Animated Television Shows, David Perlmutter writes, "While Hanna-Barbera was, because of obvious production restrictions, unable to duplicate Lee and Kirby's complex, labyrinthine plotting from the comics, their 1967 adaptation of the Four was well produced in every other respect, and gave the team welcome exposure to those previously unfamiliar with their comic-book existence. The voice actors were unusually well cast, with Frees' Brooklyn-accented Thing standing out, and this helped compensate for the limitations of the animation process of the time. Unfortunately, the erroneous concerns about violence in the mass media ultimately marginalized the series, as it did others from the same time period."

Stan Lee, despite initially voicing optimism on both The Fantastic Four and 1967 Spider-Man series, expressed dissatisfaction with the end result stating that the comic books were written in mind with an older audience while the shows felt like they were tailored towards six-year-olds. Lee attempted to voice input to both Spider-Man producer Krantz Films and The Fantastic Four producer Hanna-Barbera, but gave up after determining their sole concern was with pleasing the sponsors. In contrast to Lee, Marvel Comics' owners Martin Goodman and subsequently Cadence Industries, were satisfied with the series as they had secured a percentage of the gross revenue from the series all through their syndication.

The show is briefly referenced in the Marvel Cinematic Universe film The Fantastic Four: First Steps (2025).

== Legal issues ==
The ownership of the show was split between Marvel Comics and Hanna-Barbera. The Walt Disney Company purchased Marvel Comics in late 2009. Prior to 2009, the show re-ran on Cartoon Network in the 1990s and on Boomerang in the early 2000s. Legal battles has happened between The Walt Disney Company, who owns Marvel, and Warner Bros. Animation, who inherited Hanna-Barbera in 2001.

== See also ==
- Fred and Barney Meet the Thing
- List of works produced by Hanna-Barbera Productions
- List of Hanna-Barbera characters
