= 1967–68 United States network television schedule (late night) =

These are the late-night schedules for the three networks during the 1967–68 season. All times are Eastern and Pacific.

NET is not included, as member television stations had local flexibility over most of their schedules, and broadcast times for network shows might have varied. ABC and CBS are not included on the weekend schedules because those networks did not offer late-night programs of any kind on the weekend.

Talk/Variety shows are highlighted in yellow, Local News & Programs are highlighted in white.

== Monday-Friday ==
-	11:00 PM	11:30 PM	12:00 AM	12:30 AM	1:00 AM	1:30 AM	2:00 AM	2:30 AM	3:00 AM	3:30 AM	4:00 AM	4:30 AM	5:00 AM	5:30 AM
ABC	Local	The Joey Bishop Show			local programming or sign-off
CBS	local programming or sign-off
NBC	local programming	The Tonight Show Starring Johnny Carson			local programming or sign-off

== Saturday/Sunday ==
-	11:00 PM	11:30 PM	12:00 AM	12:30 AM	1:00 AM	1:30 AM	2:00 AM	2:30 AM	3:00 AM	3:30 AM	4:00 AM	4:30 AM	5:00 AM	5:30 AM
NBC	local programming	The Weekend Tonight Show			local programming or sign-off

== By network ==
=== ABC ===
Returning Series

- The Joey Bishop Show

=== NBC ===
Returning Series

- The Tonight Show Starring Johnny Carson
- The Weekend Tonight Show

Not returning from 1966-67

- The Saturday/Sunday Tonight Show

=== U ===
Not returning from 1966-67

- The Las Vegas Show
