= Super President =

- Voices of: Ted Cassidy; Paul Frees; June Foray; Shepard Menken; Don Messick; Lorri Scott; Mark Skor
- Narrated by: Paul Frees
- Theme music composer: Doug Goodwin
- Country of origin: United States
- Original language: English
- No. of seasons: 1
- No. of episodes: 30

Production
- Producers: David H. DePatie; Friz Freleng
- Running time: 30 minutes
- Production companies: DePatie–Freleng Enterprises; Mirisch-Rich Television Productions

Original release
- Network: NBC
- Release: September 16, 1967 – December 28, 1968

Super President is an American animated cartoon that aired Saturday mornings on NBC from September 16, 1967, to December 28, 1968. The series was produced by the DePatie–Freleng animation company.

In the show, the President of the United States has extraordinary superpowers, including increased strength and the ability to change his molecular composition, and uses them to protect the Free World, as well as his hapless Vice President. The show was relentlessly criticized for its bad taste and low quality, and was cancelled after thirty episodes, midway through its second season.

== Plot ==
The President of the United States, former astronaut James Norcross (voiced by Paul Frees) is given superpowers as the result of a cosmic storm during a space mission. The future President gains increased strength and the Metamorpho-like ability to change his molecular composition at will to any form required (like granite, steel, ozone, water and even electricity). A hidden panel in the Oval Office allows him access to his secret base, a hidden cave beneath the "Presidential Mansion" (a somewhat modified White House). Super President travels either by using a futuristic automobile/aircraft/submarine called the Omnicar, or by using jets built into his belt.

Despite the fact that the character's name is "Super President", for some reason only Norcross' chubby, pipe-smoking advisor Jerry Sales knows that the leader of the Free World is also a red and white-costumed superhero in his off-hours.

A total of thirty episodes of Super President were produced. Two episodes appeared in each show. Each episode also included an episode of Spy Shadow starring secret agent Richard Vance (voiced by Ted Cassidy) who had learned in Tibet how to command his shadow (also voiced by Ted Cassidy) to act independently of himself, an ability he put to good use as an Interspy operative battling a variety of villains, including the evil forces of S.P.I.D.E.R. ("Society for Plunder, International Disorder, Espionage and Racketeering"). Spy Shadow could slip through small openings and hide himself in another person's shadow, and was invulnerable to harm thanks to his insubstantial nature, but his fists remained decidedly solid. Spy Shadow's only weakness is the inability to appear in total darkness for "there can be no shadow without light".

== Episodes ==
1. The Great Vegetable Disintegrator
2. The Billion Dollar Bomber
3. The Electronic Spy
4. Day of the Locusts
5. The Case of the Destroyer Satellite
6. King of the Sea
7. The U.F.O. Mystery
8. No Time Passes
9. Man of Steel
10. The Earth Robber
11. Monster of the Atoll
12. Return of the Vikings
13. The Cosmic Gladiators
14. The Condor's Eye
15. The President and the Pirate
16. Interplanetary Menace
17. Red Ray Raider
18. The Treachery of Jerry Sales
19. Rangled Terrors
20. Dound and Doom
21. Spears from Space
22. Toys of Death
23. Birds of Terror
24. The Menace of the Moles
25. The Chameleon
26. The Gravity Destroyer
27. Ice Invader
28. Electronic Giant
29. Time Crimes
30. A Million Years of Menace

== Production ==
According to Art Leonardi, who prepared presentations for DePatie–Freleng Enterprises having worked for founders David H. DePatie and Friz Freleng since their time at Warner Bros. Cartoons, stated the series came about during a "bull session" at DePatie–Freleng involving other Warner Bros. alums John Dunn and Michael Maltese who threw out the idea of tapping into the popularity of Presidents of the United States and mixing it with superhero elements with the name Super President thrown out during the session which ended up sticking. Robert McKimson directed part of Super President as McKimson had worked under DePatie and Freland on Daffy Duck cartoons the two had made while at Warner Bros. Cartoons.

== Broadcast ==
The series premiered on NBC on September 16, 1967 and ran until September 14, 1968. In the wake of rising concerns about television violence following the assassinations of Robert F. Kennedy and Martin Luther King Jr. as well as perceived tastelessness of portraying the U.S. President as a nigh invincible superhero just four years after the assassination of John F. Kennedy, NBC cancelled Super President along with other action-oriented cartoons like Birdman and the Galaxy Trio and Samson & Goliath as part of a switch from harder edged action adventure series to lighter and tamer humor focused cartoons resulting in a writedown of $750,000 by NBC.

Super President has never been rebroadcast in the United States nor has it seen release on home video.

== Reception ==
Super President came under fire from critics and TV watchdog groups, including Action for Children's Television, for its depiction of a national leader who was an invincible superhuman (especially since it debuted less than four years after John Kennedy's death). The National Association of Broadcasters said: "An all-time low in bad taste, with the President of the United States in a Superman role. NBC was responsible for this direct ideological approach to totalitarianism. We fear that there may be other broadcasters who are irresponsible enough to keep it in circulation".

In The Encyclopedia of American Animated Television Shows, David Perlmutter says that the show is "perhaps the worst animated program in the late 1960s (its producers admitted it themselves)" and calls the superhero president "arguably the most implausible superhero narrative idea ever invented".

David H. DePatie called Super President the worst project he had ever worked on and was thankful for its short run on NBC, but did take some small amusement from the irony of Richard Nixon being elected President during the portrayal of the heroic James Norcross on Super President.

== Cast ==
- Daws Butler -
- Ted Cassidy - Richard Vance, Spy Shadow
- June Foray -
- Paul Frees - Super President/James Norcross, Narrator
- Shepard Menken -
- Don Messick -
