= Shazzan =

American animated television series

- Genre: Adventure; Action
- Created by: Alex Toth
- Directed by: Joseph Barbera; William Hanna
- Voices of: Jerry Dexter; Janet Waldo; Barney Phillips; Don Messick
- Theme music composer: Hoyt Curtin
- Composer: Hoyt Curtin
- Country of origin: United States
- Original language: English
- No. of seasons: 1
- No. of episodes: 18 (36 segments)

Production
- Producers: Joseph Barbera; William Hanna
- Running time: 22 minutes (11 minutes per segment)
- Production company: Hanna-Barbera Productions

Original release
- Network: CBS
- Release: September 9, 1967 – January 20, 1968

Shazzan is an American animated television series created by Alex Toth and produced by Hanna-Barbera Productions that aired on Saturday mornings on CBS from September 9, 1967, to January 20, 1968, and continued in reruns until September 6, 1969, besides being in syndication as part of World of Super Adventures from 1979 to 1982. The series follows the adventures of two 12-year-old siblings, Chuck and Nancy, traveling around a mystical Arabian world, mounted on Kaboobie the flying camel. During their journey they face several dangers, but they are aided by Shazzan, a genie with magical powers. 18 half-hour episodes were produced, made up of two 11-minute segments.

== Plot ==
Siblings Chuck (voiced by Jerry Dexter) and Nancy (voiced by Janet Waldo) come across a cave off the coast of Maine where they find a mysterious chest containing halves of a strange ring. When they first join the two halves of the ring, they end up transported back to the fabled land of the Arabian Nights where they meet their genie Shazzan (voiced by Barney Phillips). Shazzan creates a magical flying camel named Kaboobie (voiced by Don Messick) to serve as their mode of transportation and gives them gifts like an invisibility cloak and a magic rope. Shazzan tells Chuck and Nancy that he cannot return them home until they deliver the two halves of the ring to its rightful owner known as the Wizard of the 7th Mountain.

Shazzan is very large, being able to hold Chuck, Nancy, and Kaboobie in the open palm of his hand. He is wise and jolly in nature, usually appearing with a cheerful "Ho-ho ho-HO!" and addressing the two children as his "little masters". Chuck and Nancy each wear one half of the broken ring, which has to be joined to bring forth their magical servant in times of danger or different villains.

Out of the one-shot villains, Shazzan, Chuck, Nancy, and Kaboobie had two villains they encounter more than once:

- Master of Thieves – A powerful sorcerer who leads a group of thieves.
- Demon in the Bottle – An evil demon imprisoned in a bottle that seeks vengeance on those who imprisoned him.

A frequent plot device is that the two teenagers became separated, most often by the act of a villain. They cannot summon the omnipotent genie until they manage to find each other. Once Shazzan materializes, it is extremely bad news for the villain.

== Style ==
The series is similar in its style and production details to the other Alex Toth-created CBS Saturday morning cartoons of 1966–1968, relying heavily on music and sound effects earlier created for Jonny Quest. As is typical for both animated and live-action TV series of the era that revolve around an ongoing dilemma (Dino Boy in the Lost Valley, Moby Dick and Mighty Mightor, Lost in Space, Gilligan's Island, Lidsville, etc.), the heroes never resolve their long-term situation. Chuck and Nancy never find the ring's owner and thus never return to their American teenage lives.

== Voice cast ==
The cast included:

- Barney Phillips as Shazzan
- Jerry Dexter as Chuck
- Janet Waldo as Nancy
- Don Messick as Kaboobie

== Production ==
After the success of Space Ghost, CBS' head of daytime programming, Fred Silverman, commissioned Hanna-Barbera to develop three new action-adventure series in the same vein for the 1967–68 fall schedule consisting of The Herculoids, Shazzan, and Moby Dick and Mighty Mightor. Speaking on the show several years later, Silverman lauded the creativity and artistry on display in the series while also noting the story problems that came from Shazzan's lack of weaknesses which coupled with high production costs resulted in the series being labeled a disappointment. Silverman further stated that the series faced an uphill battle due to being what he called "second generation" shows, repeats of the same idea (in this case, the formula established by Space Ghost) and being seen as derivatives that couldn't match the original.

== List of episodes ==
Each half-hour episode consists of two 11-minute cartoons.

No.	Title	Original release date
1a	"The Living Island"	September 9, 1967
In order to give Kaboobie a rest, Chuck and Nancy land him on an island where they end up hunted by an evil hunter.
1b	"Master of Thieves"	September 9, 1967
An underling of the Master of Thieves plans to steal Chuck and Nancy's rings in order to give them to his master.
2a	"Valley of the Giants"	September 16, 1967
Chuck and Nancy travel through a valley which is inhabited by a cyclops.
2b	"The Black Sultan"	September 16, 1967
Chuck and Nancy encounter a prince that has been turned into a pig. He is on a mission to rescue his princess from a sleeping spell cast by the Black Sultan.
3a	"The Underground World"	September 23, 1967
While exploring some caverns, Chuck and Nancy are attacked by giant bats.
3b	"Demon in the Bottle"	September 23, 1967
Nancy and Chuck find themselves on an island and discover a bottle. They open it, and from it emerges the Evil Demon of the Bottle, who has been trapped for 4,000 years and wants revenge on the one who trapped him.
4a	"Ring of Samarra"	September 30, 1967
While trying to save Princess Jasmine, Chuck and Nancy end up chased by giant birds made of glass. It is soon discovered that the Evil Khan of El Jawali is holding her hostage in order to claim her father's Ring of Samarra.
4b	"City of Brass"	September 30, 1967
While flying over the ocean, Chuck, Nancy, and Kaboobie get lost and land on a ship to ask for directions. They find a ship full of brass statues that come to life and capture them in order to make them their slaves.
5a	"The Evil Jester of Masira"	October 7, 1967
The Evil Jester of Masira steals the secret Book of Evil Magic in a plot to overthrow the Viceroy of Masira and take over his kingdom.
5b	"The Master Wizard of Mizwa"	October 7, 1967
Upon finding a garden, Chuck, Nancy, and Kaboobie end up captured by an evil wizard
6a	"Demon in the Bottle Returns"	October 14, 1967
The Demon in the Bottle that Chuck, Nancy, and Shazzan had previously defeated returns for revenge. He manages to separate Chuck and Nancy so that they wouldn't summon Shazzan.
6b	"City of the Tombs"	October 14, 1967
Chuck, Nancy, and Kaboobie fly over the Desert of the Dead only to be captured and taken to the City of the Tombs.
7a	"The Young Rajah of Kamura"	October 21, 1967
Chuck and Nancy save a young Rajah from Kamura from certain death. Now they must fight to keep the evil Regent from claiming the throne
7b	"The Sky Pirates of Basheena"	October 21, 1967
Nancy is captured by the Sky Pirates of Basheena and it's up to Chuck to save Nancy.
8a	"The Forest of Fear"	October 28, 1967
Chuck and Nancy travel through the Forest of Fear in order to find the Magical Tree of Tureen.
8b	"Sorceress of the Mist"	October 28, 1967
The Sorceress of the Mist captures Nancy in order for her to become the next Sorceress of the Mist.
9a	"The Flaming Ruby"	November 4, 1967
The Maharajah wants to use Kaboobie to steal the Flaming Ruby of Eternal Truth.
9b	"Keys of the Zodiac"	November 4, 1967
Chuck and Nancy fight an evil wizard who can summon his evil Twins of Gemini to steal the sultan's Keys of the Zodiac. The only problem is that the Twins of Gemini resemble Chuck and Nancy and it's up to Shazzan to prove their innocence.
10a	"Lord of the Shadows"	November 11, 1967
The Lord of the Shadows sends some of his shadow creatures to steal the Jade Goddess from the Shah of Salim so that he can have its magical all-seeing powers.
10b	"The Diamond of El Rhapir"	November 11, 1967
The Magician of the Mirrors captures Nancy at the time when she is holding the Diamond of El Rhapir. Chuck and Kaboobie must fly through the mirror to rescue her.
11a	"The Idol of Turaba"	November 18, 1967
Chuck and Nancy witness a girl getting captured and taken behind a waterfall to a secret city which is made of porcelain and the river is made of clay. Note: This episode was adapted by Gold Key Comics in an issue of Hanna-Barbera's Super TV Heroes.
11b	"The Land of Neverwas"	November 18, 1967
Chuck and Nancy are captured by the ruler of the Land of Neverwas as part of a plot to take revenge on the kindly Wizard of the 7th Mountain.
12a	"The Three Horsemen of Mandragora"	November 25, 1967
Chuck and Nancy unwittingly release the Three Horsemen of Mandragora upon being tricked by the Sultan.
12b	"A Thousand and One Tricks"	November 25, 1967
Chuck and Nancy run into their friend the Rajah of Kamura who has been imprisoned in his own palace.
13a	"The Circus of Zahran"	December 2, 1967
Chuck, Nancy, and Kaboobie arrive in the city of Zahran and visit the local circus. They end up stumbling onto a plot by the circus' ringmaster to take over the city and take all of its treasures.
13b	"Baharum The Befuddled"	December 2, 1967
Chuck and Nancy run into a genie named Baharum the Befuddled who is being controlled by the Master of Thieves.
14a	"The Impossible Quest of Nazir"	December 16, 1967
Chuck and Nancy go to the Temple of Knowledge to ask the Sage of Nazir for directions to where the Wizard of the 7th Mountain lives. The Sage of Nazir has them perform two different tasks. Chuck and Nancy are unaware that an evil magician is posing as the Sage of Nazir and has the real Sage of Nazir imprisoned.
14b	"A Pound of Evil Magic"	December 16, 1967
Chuck and Nancy set out to meet their friend the Viceroy of Rapport where the run into the evil Master Wizard of Mizwater who plots to destroy the Viceroy of Rapport's kingdom.
15a	"The Maze of Mercuraad"	December 30, 1967
Chuck and Nancy get lost in the valley of the 5th Mountain when on their way to the 7th Mountain. They end up running into the valley's guardian Mercuraad who demands payment for them to pass.
15b	"The Magical Kingdom of Centuria"	December 30, 1967
The Magical Kingdom of Centuria only appears on Earth for 12 Hours every 100 years in order to find a new king. Chuck and Nancy see Centuria appear and end up captured by its queen who plots to make Shazzan its king.
16a	"Nastrina of the Flames"	January 6, 1968
While Chuck and Nancy are flying on Kaboobie, a magical cloud causes them to crash on an island where they find a princess being chased by a dragon. It soon turns out that the princess is really an evil sorceress named Nastrina who plots to destroy Shazzan.
16b	"Quest for the Magic Lamp"	January 6, 1968
The Master of Thieves steals Aladdin's lamp. Chuck and Nancy team up with Aladdin to get his lamp back.
17a	"Raschid, the Apprentice Sorcerer"	January 13, 1968
Kabala is an evil sorcerer who has a grudge against Shazzan. He sends his apprentice Raschid to find Chuck and Nancy in order to get to Shazzan.
17b	"Kahn of the North Wind"	January 13, 1968
Chuck and Nancy's friend Shalimar is captured by an evil wizard named Kahn.
18a	"The Mirage Maker"	January 20, 1968
The Mirage Maker kidnaps Kaboobie and a princess. Chuck and Nancy are forced by the Mirage Maker to deliver a message to the sultan for their safe release.
18b	"Mysterio, the Mini Magi"	January 20, 1968
Chuck and Nancy are pursued by flying imps who apparently have a deal with an evil wizard to get the two so he can lure and capture Shazzan.

== Other appearances ==
Shazzan has appeared on an episode of Harvey Birdman, Attorney at Law voiced by Maurice LaMarche. In the episode "Mufti Trouble," he had a long-standing rivalry with Mentok the Mindtaker. Chuck and Nancy also appeared in the episode.

Shazzan appeared in "The Final Encounter", an episode of Space Ghost. It was last episode of the six part "The Council of Doom". Space Ghost falls in a trap that transports him to the dimension of Shazzan. Shazzan helps him defeat the Sultan of Flame and transports him back to his own dimension.

A satirized version of Shazzan named Shazzang! appeared as an animated short as part of Robert Smigel's Saturday TV Funhouse feature on the late night sketch comedy series Saturday Night Live, on the May 14, 2005 episode. The parody depicted the genie Shazzang quickly defeating the villain, but then maiming and executing the villain in an increasingly sadistic fashion, to the horror of Chuck, Nancy, and Kaboobie, eventually babbling about having to "please his dad". It is shown on the DVD version of the SNL special "The Best of TV Funhouse".

Shazzan appears in Jellystone! voiced by Fajer Al-Kaisi. This version is shown to be at normal size and is a love interest for Mildew Wolf. Shazzan does many vendor jobs and is often working as a ticket seller at the Jellystone Theatre. He mentions Kaboobie in the season 2 episode "Lady Danjjer: Is It Wrong to Long for Kabong?" where he gives a shoutout to him at the time when Shazzan was promoting his gourmet ice cream.

== Home media ==
Two episodes of Shazzan were released on a Saturday morning cartoon compilation, along with a short video containing some background information. On April 3, 2012, Warner Archive released Shazzan: The Complete Series on DVD in region 1 as part of their Hanna–Barbera Classics Collection. This is a Manufacture-on-Demand (MOD) release, available exclusively through Warner's online store and Amazon.com. All episodes, while not perfect, have been remastered for this release.

== See also ==
- List of works produced by Hanna-Barbera Productions
- List of Hanna-Barbera characters
