= Moby Dick and Mighty Mightor =

American animated television series

- Genre: Science fiction
- Written by: David Scott; Ed Brandt
- Directed by: William Hanna; Joseph Barbera
- Voices of: Barry Balkin; Bobby Resnick; Don Messick; John Stephenson; Paul Stewart; Bobby Diamond; Patsy Garrett
- Narrated by: Don Messick (opening narration)
- Composers: Hoyt Curtin; Ted Nichols
- Country of origin: United States
- Original language: English
- No. of seasons: 1
- No. of episodes: 18 (36 Mightor segments and 18 Moby Dick segments)

Production
- Producers: William Hanna; Joseph Barbera
- Running time: 30 minutes
- Production company: Hanna-Barbera Productions

Original release
- Network: CBS
- Release: September 9, 1967 – January 6, 1968

Moby Dick and Mighty Mightor is an American Saturday-morning animated television series produced by Hanna-Barbera Productions that ran on CBS from September 9, 1967 to January 6, 1968, airing in reruns until September 6, 1969. Despite Moby's name coming first, he had only one short per half-hour episode, sandwiched between two with Mightor. The same structure was used the previous season for Frankenstein Jr. and The Impossibles.

== Characters and plot ==
=== Mightor ===
One day, while on a hunting trip, a teenage caveman named Tor (voiced by Bobby Diamond), along with his winged pet dinosaur Tog (vocal effects provided by John Stephenson), rescue an ancient hermit from an Allosaurus. As a reward, the hermit gives Tor a magical club. When Tor raises his club to the sky, he transforms into the masked and muscular Mightor (voiced by Paul Stewart), a prehistoric superhero who possesses superhuman strength and the power of flight through his club, which can also fire energy blasts. He can also transform Tog into a powerful fire-breathing dragon.

Mightor protects his village from evil-doers. Amongst the villagers are the chief Pondo (voiced by John Stephenson) and his daughter Sheera (voiced by Patsy Garrett). Sheera has a younger brother named Little Rok (voiced by Norma MacMillan), who loves pretending to be Mightor which often causes him to be saved from danger by Mightor on different occasions. The characters have several pets, including Little Rok's bird Ork (vocal effects provided by John Stephenson), and Sheera's mammoth calf Bollo (vocal effects also provided by Stephenson).

Mightor had recurring enemies like:

- Korg - An exiled member of Tor's tribe
- Serpent Queen (voiced by Jean Vander Pyl) - A serpent-themed female
- Kragor - The leader of the Cave Creatures
- Rog - The leader of the Stone Men
- Vultar - Leader of the Vulture Men
- Grok - A caveman who unleashed Tyrannor, and later stole the Golden Rock to control the beasts

Mightor bears a number of similarities to the Marvel superhero Thor, particularly during the early of run of the latter titular character's series. Both heroes having a secret identity of an ordinary, unassuming man with a superpowered alter ego when possessing a powerful mystical weapon. Their respective names and titles are quite similar as well.

No.	Title	Original release date
1	"The Monster Keeper" "The Tiger Men"	September 9, 1967
"The Monster Keeper: "The Tiger Men":
2	"The Serpent Queen" "The Bird People"	September 16, 1967
"The Serpent Queen": "The Bird People":
3	"The Giant Hunters" "Mightor Meets Tyrannor"	September 23, 1967
"The Giant Hunters": "Mightor Meets Tyrannor":
4	"Brutor, the Barbarian" "Return of Korg"	September 30, 1967
"Brutor, the Barbarian": "Return of Korg":
5	"Kragor and the Cavern Creatures" "The Tusk People"	October 7, 1967
"Kragor and the Cavern Creatures": "The Tusk People":
6	"The People Keepers" "The Snow Trapper"	October 14, 1967
"The People Keepers": "The Snow Trapper":
7	"The Vulture Men" "The Tree Pygmies"	October 21, 1967
"The Vulture Men": "The Tree Pygmies":
8	"The Stone Men" "Charr and the Fire People"	October 28, 1967
"The Stone Men": "Charr and the Fire People":
9	"Cult of Cavebearers" "Vampire Island"	November 4, 1967
"Cult of Cavebearers": "Vampire Island":
10	"Revenge of the Serpent Queen" "Attack of the Ice Creatures"	November 11, 1967
"Revenge of the Serpent Queen": "Attack of the Ice Creatures":
11	"The Scorpion Men" "Rok and His Gang"	November 18, 1967
"The Scorpion Men": "Rok and His Gang":
12	"A Big Day for Little Rok" "The Sea Slavers"	November 25, 1967
"A Big Day for Little Rok": "The Sea Slavers":
13	"Tribe of the Witchmen" "The Plant People"	December 2, 1967
"Tribe of the Witchmen": "The Plant People":
14	"The Return of the Vulture Men" "Battle of the Mountain Monsters"	December 9, 1967
"The Return of the Vulture Men": "Battle of the Mountain Monsters":
15	"Vengeance of the Storm King" "The Mightiest Warrior"	December 16, 1967
"Vengeance of the Storm King": "The Mightiest Warrior":
16	"Rok to the Rescue" "Dinosaur Island"	December 23, 1967
"Rok to the Rescue": "Dinosaur Island":
17	"The Missing Village" "The Greatest Escape"	December 30, 1967
"The Missing Village": "The Greatest Escape":
18	"The Battle of the Mightors" "Rok and the Golden Rok"	January 6, 1968
"The Battle of the Mightors": "Rok and the Golden Rok"

=== Moby Dick ===
Teenage boys Tom (voiced by Bobby Resnick) and Tubb (voiced by Barry Balkin) are rescued by the great white whale Moby Dick (vocal effects provided by Don Messick) after a shipwreck. Together with their pet seal Scooby (vocal effects provided by Messick), they face the dangers of the undersea world.

No.	Title	Original release date
1	"The Sinister Sea Saucer"	September 9, 1967
2	"The Electrofying Shoctopus"	September 16, 1967
3	"The Crab Creatures"	September 23, 1967
4	"The Sea Monster"	September 30, 1967
5	"The Undersea World"	October 7, 1967
6	"The Aqua-Bats"	October 14, 1967
7	"The Iceberg Monster"	October 21, 1967
8	"The Shark Men"	October 28, 1967
9	"The Saucers Shells"	November 4, 1967
10	"Moraya, the Eel Queen"	November 11, 1967
11	"Toadus, Ruler of the Dead Ships"	November 18, 1967
12	"The Cereb-Men"	November 25, 1967
13	"The Vortex Trap"	December 2, 1967
14	"The Sand Creatures"	December 9, 1967
15	"The Sea Ark"	December 16, 1967
16	"The Shimmering Screen"	December 23, 1967
17	"Soodak the Invader"	December 30, 1967
18	"The Iguana Men"	January 6, 1968

== Production ==
After the success of Space Ghost, CBS' head of daytime programming, Fred Silverman, commissioned Hanna-Barbera to develop three new action-adventure series in the same vein for the 1967–68 fall schedule consisting of The Herculoids, Shazzan, and Moby Dick and Mighty Mightor. Silverman stated that the series faced an uphill battle due to being what he called "second generation" shows, repeats of the same idea (in this case, the formula established by Space Ghost) and being seen as derivatives that couldn't match the original.

== Broadcast ==
The series was broadcast on CBS from September 9, 1967 through September 6, 1969. Cartoon Network rebroadcast the series beginning in February 7, 1993 and continued to air the series until February 18, 1995 on Cartoon Network's Boomerang programming block dedicated to showcases of older cartoons.

== Home media ==
On July 19, 2011, Warner Archive released Moby Dick and the Mighty Mightor: The Complete Series on DVD in region 1 as part of their Hanna-Barbera Classic Collection. This is a Manufacture-on-Demand (MOD) release, available exclusively through Warner's online store and Amazon.com.

== Other appearances ==
Along with other Hanna-Barbera heroes, Mightor and Moby Dick appear in a crossover with a time-traveling Space Ghost during the final six episodes ("The Council of Doom") of the latter's original series.

Moby Dick and the Mighty Mightor and his friends appear in the comic book Hanna-Barbera Super TV Heroes #1–7 (April 1968 – Oct. 1969).

In 1972, Moby Dick appeared briefly in Yogi's Ark Lark when Captain Noah and Yogi Bear accidentally landed their flying ark on Moby's back.

Moby Dick, Tom, and Tubb appear as animated figures in the Kings Island attraction The Enchanted Voyage which operated from 1972-1983. Little Rok and Scooby also appeared alongside them as cutouts on the ride’s exterior.

Characters from Moby Dick later appear in Sealab 2021: Tubb as child actor star "Chubby Cox", and Scooby the seal as "Stinky Pete", whose appearances culminate in his eyes becoming near-demonic, uttering his catchphrase "I'm cha-cha-cha-cha-delicious".

Mightor makes some appearances in the Adult Swim show Harvey Birdman, Attorney at Law, as Judge Hiram Mightor and voiced by Gary Cole. Moby Dick appears in the episode "SPF", voiced by Wally Wingert.

Tom, Tubb, and Scooby the seal appear in the Scooby-Doo! Mystery Incorporated episode "The Midnight Zone", with Tom and Tubb voiced by Dee Bradley Baker. Moby Dick is depicted as a submarine piloted by Tom and Tubb. They helped Mystery Incorporated and Cassidy Williams to reach the Midnight Zone (the deepest part of the ocean near Crystal Cove) when World War II robots have been attacking Cassidy Williams.

Mightor and Moby Dick have cameos in the film Scooby-Doo! Mask of the Blue Falcon.

Mightor appears in Space Jam: A New Legacy. He is among the Warner Bros. 3000 Server-Verse inhabitants that watch the basketball game between the Tune Squad and the Goon Squad.

Mightor, Little Rok, Ork, Moby Dick and Tubb appear in Jellystone!, with Mightor voiced by Jim Conroy, Little Rok voiced by SungWon Cho, Moby Dick voiced by Paul F. Tompkins in the first appearance and by Dana Snyder in the second appearance, and Tubb voiced by Dana Snyder. Mightor was shown as a wrestler who went up against The Funky Phantom in his infamous wrestling match. The Funky Phantom misused his ghostly powers on him causing the referee Gravity Girl to remove The Funky Phantom from the ring. Moby Dick appears in the episode "The Sea Monster of Jellystone Cove". He is mentioned to have a birthday and reside in Jellystone Cove. Moby Dick appears at the end of the episode where he rolls on everybody for being at his cove during his birthday. Tubb is a recurring character in the third season and has a German accent. Little Rok and Ork appear in the season three episode "Collection Protection" where Little Rok is an anime fan, a rival of Peter Potamus, and the proprietor of Little Rok's Big Museum of Anime and Manga Memorabilia. In "Chair Me Matey", Moby Dick is shown to be friends with Captain Swipe of Jellystone's local air pirates where he once bailed Moby out of jail for swallowing a child. He had fallen onto hard times where his girlfriend Brenda broke up with him and took everything and once dated a mermaid that was actually a whale in disguise. When Yogi Bear and Captain Swipe come looking for the chair that Captain Swipe sold to Moby Dick, he told them that he sold it to Dad Gift Island. When Moby Dick caught up with Yogi, Boo Boo, and the Air Pirates, he helped pay Nugget Nose for the chair after he successfully sued the whale that posed as a mermaid.

A new incarnation of Mightor appears in the 2016 DC comic book series Future Quest, along with several other characters from Hanna-Barbera's action cartoons. This version is a young black boy of modern times who discovers the original's club and is transformed into a new Mightor, with the boy's pet cat becoming a powerful saber-toothed cat. This Mightor is mentored in his new heroic role by Birdman.

== See also ==
- Moby-Dick, 1851 novel by Herman Melville
- List of works produced by Hanna-Barbera Productions
- List of Hanna-Barbera characters
