= John Bartholomew Tucker =

American media perdonality/author (1930–2014)

- Born: April 9, 1930; Pennsylvania, U.S.
- Died: December 7, 2014 (aged 84); Hastings On Hudson, New York, U.S.
- Occupations: American radio and television personality

John Bartholomew Tucker (April 9, 1930 – December 7, 2014) was an American radio and television personality, as well as an author.

== Career ==
Along with Big Wilson, Tucker was one of the last two "communicators" (hosts) of the long-running NBC Radio program Monitor; he was on the air when the show signed off for the last time on January 26, 1975. On television, he was seen as the host of the short-lived unique lagoon game show Treasure Isle, filmed at The Colonnades Beach Hotel on Singer Island which aired on ABC from 1967 to 1968.

In the early 1970s, Tucker hosted a local morning show on WABC-TV in New York City, called A.M. New York, which served as the genesis for what is now Good Morning America, as well as being an indirect ancestor to what is now Live with Kelly and Ryan. He also co-host the syndicated version of Candid Camera during its first season, from 1974 to 1975, followed by another local talk show, The John Bartholomew Tucker Show, on WCBS-TV. Tucker had done voice-over work on numerous commercials and other projects over the years, notably for Fotomat in the 1970s and '80s, Dirt Devil vacuum cleaners in the '90s, and also for Owens-Corning and their "Pink Panther" spots advertising their fiberglass insulation.

In 1975, he played a bit part in the movie, Abduction.

== Publications ==
Tucker is known to have written two novels, both based on the television business:

- He's Dead, She's Dead — Details at Eleven (ISBN 0-517-07807-4), published in 1991 by Random House
- The Man Who Looked Like Howard Cosell (ISBN 0-312-02248-4), published in 1988 by St. Martin's Press.
