= Snap Judgment (game show) =

- Created by: Mark Goodson; Bill Todman
- Presented by: Ed McMahon; Gene Rayburn (substitute)
- Announcer: Johnny Olson
- Country of origin: United States
- No. of episodes: 492

Production
- Running time: 25 minutes

Original release
- Network: NBC
- Release: April 3, 1967 – March 28, 1969

Snap Judgment is an American daytime game show hosted by Ed McMahon (with Gene Rayburn as occasional substitute) and announced by Johnny Olson which ran on NBC from April 3, 1967, to March 28, 1969, at 10:00 AM Eastern (9:00 Central). The program was created and produced by Mark Goodson and Bill Todman.

The series aired during an eight-year period in which the network aired a five-minute newscast at 10:25 AM; the exception during this time was from June 1964 to March 1965, when the slot had daytime repeats of the sitcom Make Room For Daddy (a series which had never aired on NBC in first-run).

== Game play ==
=== Format #1 ===
The original format featured a word-association game played by two teams consisting of a contestant and a celebrity. Contestants completed their associations before the start of the show and their celebrity teammates had three tries to guess the association based on the clue word provided by McMahon. A correct guess won $10, while no correct identification allowed the other team to get the $10 by guessing correctly with one try. If both teams failed to guess correctly, the contestant would reveal the first letter of the association and each celebrity had one shot at guessing the association. The first team to score $100 won the game and played a bonus round, called "The Big 5".

With the contestant offstage in a soundproof room, the celebrity teammate was asked to come up with five associations to a clue word provided by the host, then designate one of those five as a bonus word, the one his or her teammate was most likely to say. The contestant would then return and have 20 seconds to come up with all five associations for $50 each.

Initially, the contestant merely had to say the bonus word in order to double the team's winnings. When it quickly became apparent that this was too easy, the producers added a new rule requiring the contestant to guess the bonus word to double the team's winnings. For the second game on the same show, the celebrities switched teams.

The score (and earnings) counters for each team consisted of three digits. On those rare occasions when a contestant's total earnings exceeded $1000.00, the counter would display $999.

=== Format #2 ===
On December 23, 1968 the game format was changed to one virtually identical to Password, which had been cancelled by CBS over a year earlier. In the new format, the objective was to guess a word from one-word clues with a point structure identical to that of Password (10 points were awarded for guessing the password on the first clue, nine points on the second clue, eight points on the third clue, etc.) After the fifth word, point values doubled.

The first team to reach 25 points won $100 and played a reformatted "Big 5", played similarly to Password's "Lightning Round", only with 30 seconds to guess five words at $100 each.

There were no returning champions in either format. Each show featured two new contestants.

== Theme music ==
For the first five months, Snap Judgment used as its main theme the composition "Window Shopping" by Bob Cobert (previously used on The Price Is Right).

The second theme, named after the series and composed by Score Productions, debuted on September 4, 1967 and remained until the show's end.

== Episode status ==
Due to network wiping practices of the era, and unlike a majority of Goodson-Todman games which were preserved using videotape or kinescope recordings, no episodes of Snap Judgment are known to exist.

== Board game ==
In 1968, a Snap Judgment board game was released by Milton Bradley.
