= Cool McCool =

Animated television series

- Opening titles
- Created by: Bob Kane; Al Brodax
- Starring: Bob McFadden; Chuck McCann; Carol Corbett
- Countries of origin: United States; Australia
- No. of episodes: 20 (list of episodes)

Production
- Running time: 25 minutes
- Production companies: King Features Entertainment; Artransa Park Film Studios

Original release
- Network: NBC
- Release: September 10, 1966 – January 21, 1967

Cool McCool is a Saturday morning animated series that ran on NBC from September 10, 1966, to January 21, 1967, with three segments per show, consisting overall of sixty segments. It was created by Bob Kane—who was most famous as one of the creators of Batman—and produced by Al Brodax for King Features.

The show was drawn in Australia, with Artransa Park Film Studios completing the bulk of the animation. Due to the quick turn-around times required by the rapid production schedule, further animation was completed by other Australian artists such as Gus McLaren and Eric Porter Studios.

== Description ==
Riffing off the then-popular genres of superheroes and James Bond spy adventures, Cool McCool featured the adventures of a hip, trenchcoated spy, who—as on the contemporary TV show Get Smart—defeated villains despite being comically inept. Villains included the Rattler, Hurricane Harry, the Owl, Jack-In-The-Box and Dr. Madcap.

McCool's boss was known as Number One, although his face was never seen onscreen; only his arms and a cigar were visible behind his chair. Number One's secretary was Friday, a dumpy girl who had an unrequited crush on the secret agent.

McCool has three catchphrases: "Danger is my business!", "When you're right, Number One, you're right", and (after bungling something) "That will never happen again, Number One".

The show also featured a Keystone Kops-style segment featuring the adventures of McCool's father, Harry McCool, a uniformed police officer, presumed to have taken place decades before Cool's time. Harry was supported by his brothers Dick and Tom. The Cool McCool character sang the theme song to his father's segments, which ended with his proclaiming, in a plaintive voice, "My Pop ... the cop". Only 20 Harry McCool segments were made, each sandwiched between the two Cool McCool segments per show.

== Cast ==
Cool and Harry were voiced by Bob McFadden, while most of the other voices were supplied by Chuck McCann. Carol Corbett provided the voices of the female characters. McFadden modeled McCool's voice after comic legend Jack Benny.

=== Secret, Inc. ===
- Cool McCool: A secret agent who takes several risks to save the world. Despite his powerful skills and super-spy abilities, he can be bumbling, foolish and clumsy at times (but also supernaturally lucky, so attempts on his life keep backfiring on his adversaries). He drives a modified car called the "Coolmobile" (that can also transform into a jet plane or a submarine), which he summons by whistling. His mustache tingles when there is danger lurking, and can also be used as a telephone to contact Number One. A running gag in the series is that after the end of each mission, despite being successful (often in spite of his own bumbling), Cool would do something that would make Number One mad, thus causing him to get ejected. His catchphrases are "Danger is my business!", "When you're right, Number One, you're right" and "That will never happen again, Number One." He is voiced by Bob McFadden.
- Number One: Cool's boss. Whenever Cool does something really stupid, he ejects him from the headquarters by means of a control dashboard at his desk. An office chair, footstool, file cabinet, water cooler and/or coat rack suddenly come to life when Number One starts pushing buttons, attacking and disposing of McCool in hasty, violent fashion. Always obscured by his huge chair, the only part of Number One ever shown are his arms, hands and a cigar. His real name is never revealed. He is voiced by Chuck McCann.
- Mr. Riggs: Secret Inc.'s technician and repairman. He regularly makes prototypes of devices that are supposed to help McCool, but instead, backfire or hurt him—and yet Number One usually blames McCool for their failure. He is voiced by Chuck McCann.
- Friday: Number One's secretary who has a crush on Cool. She is mostly a klutz. She is voiced by Carol Corbett.
- Breezy: Cool McCool's adolescent sidekick who aids him on occasion. He is always there on the job when Cool is in trouble. He wears a trenchcoat like Cool and has hair covering his eyes, a hat, a buck tooth and a soft voice. Unlike Cool, he makes few mistakes and is not as accident prone. He is voiced by Chuck McCann.

=== Harry McCool segment (Komedy Kops) ===
These segments were flashbacks, supposed to have taken place years or decades before Cool's time. At the end of every first Cool McCool segment, Cool sings about his recent missions and that he should be more like his father (a uniformed police officer who was even more of a bumbler), and the flashback segment starts.

- Harry McCool: Cool's father, who, along with his brothers Dick and Tom (Cool's uncles), were the Komedy Kops, a take-off on the Keystone Kops. He is the tallest and most intelligent member of the trio, thus the de facto leader, occupying the first seat in their chosen mode of transportation, a three seater bicycle. Like his son, Harry is voiced by Bob McFadden.
- Dick McCool: The rotund brother of Harry and Tom rides in the middle seat of their bike. He is often befuddled by Tom's gibberish, so his catchphrase question is, "What did he say, Harry? What did he say?". He is voiced by Chuck McCann.
- Tom McCool: The shorter brother of Harry and Dick has a bushy black mustache and hair that covers his eyes. He rides in the bicycle's back seat. He speaks gibberish that only Harry seems to understand. He is voiced by Chuck McCann.

=== Villains ===
Cool McCool's enemies. Although each villain normally acts independently (aside from married couple Dr. Madcap and Greta Ghoul, who work together), the in-between sequences introducing Harry McCool shows them united in their quest to capture Cool McCool (they are usually outwitted nevertheless).

- The Owl: A barefooted, owl-themed human supervillain who is the first antagonist Cool McCool encounters in the series. He lives in a cave with pet owls and (in the debut episode) a cat-themed evil girlfriend named Pussycat (voiced by Corbett). He has the ability to command the bird kingdom to do his evil bidding. The Owl is a parody of the Penguin and is voiced by Chuck McCann.
- The Rattler: A snake-like, green cyber-human villain with a passion for the arts. He hisses and slithers, and can communicate with and control plant life. The Rattler is also known to wield shotguns and bombs. He is a parody of the Riddler, although his ability to control plant life also makes him a bit of an analog for Poison Ivy. He is voiced by Chuck McCann.
- Dr. Madcap: A wacky foe with the ability to control all hats and make them do his dirty work. He adores both his collection of hats and Greta Ghoul, his wife. He is a parody of the Mad Hatter from Batman. Madcap's hats sometimes contain deadly surprises such as anvils or guns. He is voiced by Bob McFadden.
- Greta Ghoul, aka Greta "Greenlips" Ghoul: Dr. Madcap's wife, who does not always feel appreciated or loved by her husband. She is a light gray-skinned woman who is often moody and depressed. Her vampire voice is done by Carol Corbett in an impression of Greta Garbo, after whom the character is modeled.
- Hurricane Harry: An overweight, blustery human who uses lung power to create mighty gusts that can blow anything out of his path. He speaks in a deep voice and a lisp. His fiancée is Bellows Belle (Carol Corbett), who wheezes when speaking. Harry's one weakness is his buck tooth that, when accidentally knocked out of his mouth, causes him to rapidly deflate like a balloon. He does not appear to be a parody of any Batman villains, but is more of an exaggerated caricature of Sydney Greenstreet. He is voiced by Chuck McCann.
- Jack-In-A-Box: A maniacal crook in red-and-yellow jester attire who hides in a jack-in-the-box to scare and attack his victims. His weapons include a shotgun, grenades filled with laughing gas, and spring-loaded shoes. Whenever he speaks, his waist bounces up and down, and his voice vibrates like a jack-in-the-box spring. He is a parody of the Joker, voiced by Bob McFadden.

== Episode list ==
No.	Title	Original release date
1	"Fine Feathered Fiends"	September 10, 1966
1	"The Phantom of the Opera House"	September 10, 1966
1	"The Big Blowout"	September 10, 1966
2	"The House that Jack Built"	September 17, 1966
2	"Horsehide and Go Seek"	September 17, 1966
2	"If the Hat Fits...Watch It"	September 17, 1966
3	"Garden of Evil"	September 24, 1966
3	"The Vaishing Shoehorns"	September 24, 1966
3	"The Odd Boxes Caper"	September 24, 1966
4	"Queen's Ransom"	October 1, 1966
4	"Here's Pie in Your Eye"	October 1, 1966
4	"Rocket Racket"	October 1, 1966
5	"Shrinking the Slinker"	October 8, 1966
5	"The Wood-Chopper"	October 8, 1966
5	"The Big Brainwash"	October 8, 1966
6	"Bagging the Windbag"	October 15, 1966
6	"Gym Dandy"	October 15, 1966
6	"The Box Fox"	October 15, 1966
7	"Owl on the Prowl"	October 22, 1966
7	"Big Top Cops"	October 22, 1966
7	"Will the Real Cool Mobile Please Stand Up"	October 22, 1966
8	"How Now Foul Owl"	October 29, 1966
8	"The New Car"	October 29, 1966
8	"Sniffin, Snoozen, and Sneezen"	October 29, 1966
9	"Caps and Robbers"	November 5, 1966
9	"Three Men on a House"	November 5, 1966
9	"The Romantic Rattler"	November 5, 1966
10	"Jack in the Boxer"	November 12, 1966
10	"Fowl Play"	November 12, 1966
10	"Love Is a Gas"	November 12, 1966
11	"The 500 Lb. Canary Caper"	November 19, 1966
11	"The Jet Set, Yet"	November 19, 1966
11	"Who Stole My 32 Secret Agents?"	November 19, 1966
12	"Fun and Games"	November 26, 1966
12	"McCool Jazz"	November 26, 1966
12	"Mother Greta's Wrinkle Remover"	November 26, 1966
13	"Rockabye for Rattler"	December 3, 1966
13	"Dog Tired"	December 3, 1966
13	"Two Fats and a Fink"	December 3, 1966
14	"High Jacker Jack"	December 10, 1966
14	"High Jokers"	December 10, 1966
14	"The Wind Goddess"	December 10, 1966
15	"A Growing Problem"	December 17, 1966
15	"Time Out"	December 17, 1966
15	"Hot McHot"	December 17, 1966
16	"Oh Say Can You Seed"	December 24, 1966
16	"Monkey Dizziness"	December 24, 1966
16	"What Goes Up... Must Come Down"	December 24, 1966
17	"Birds of a Feather Flop Together"	December 31, 1966
17	"Green Dragon"	December 31, 1966
17	"The Box Popper"	December 31, 1966
18	"A Tree Is a Tree Is a...Tree?"	December 31, 1966
18	"A Lot of Ballooney"	December 31, 1966
18	"Owl's Well That Ends Well"	December 31, 1966
19	"The College of Crooks"	January 14, 1967
19	"Goat Chasers"	January 14, 1967
19	"The Whistler's Mommy Case"	January 14, 1967
20	"The Sombrero Affair"	January 21, 1967
20	"In the Dough"	January 21, 1967
20	"The Moon Goon"	January 21, 1967

== DVD & VHS ==
=== Rhino records ===
- Cool McCool Collection – 2003, DVD

=== Hollywood DVD ===
- Cool McCool: How To Catch a Crook – 2003, UK PAL DVD
- Cool McCool: Danger is My Business / G-Force – 2004, UK PAL DVD
- Cool McCool: Danger is my Business / Felix the Cat – 2004, UK PAL DVD

=== Best Film & Video Co ===
- Cool McCool: Shooting the Breeze – 1990, VHS
- Cool McCool: Grime & Punishment – 1990, VHS
- Cool McCool: How to Catch a Crook – 1990, VHS

=== BCI Eclipse ===
- Animated All Stars vol. 1 – 2006, 2 DVDs – (two Cool McCool episodes)
- Cool McCool: The Complete Series – March 13, 2007, 3 DVDs
- Advantage Cartoon Mega Pack – DVD set that includes 6 Cool McCool episodes packaged with episodes of Magical Adventures of Quasimodo, Barney Google and Snuffy Smith, Hägar the Horrible, Krazy Kat, Betty Boop, and others.
