= The Family Game (game show) =

- Created by: Chuck Barris
- Presented by: Bob Barker
- Announcer: Scott Beach
- Country of origin: United States

Production
- Running time: 30 Minutes
- Production company: Chuck Barris Productions

Original release
- Network: ABC
- Release: June 19 – December 29, 1967

The Family Game is an American game show that ran on ABC for six months in 1967. Geoff Edwards was originally to host the (unrecorded) pilot, but was dropped at the last minute and was replaced by producer Chuck Barris. Although ABC bought the series, they mandated that someone other than Barris be the host; Bob Barker, then hosting Truth or Consequences and also began hosting the Miss USA & Miss Universe beauty pageants on CBS that year, was selected without a screen test or pilot.

The Family Game was played similar to Barris' The Newlywed Game, except that instead of four married couples there were three families (each consisting of two children and their parents).

The series is notable for being the last new black-and-white network series to air in America prior to the nationwide switch to color in 1968.

== Gameplay ==
The Family Game had parents and their children aged 6–11 years old trying to predict and match answers to a series of questions, similar to Newlywed.

=== Round 1 ===
In Round 1, the younger children were asked three questions while their parents were off stage. The parents returned and the mothers responded to the same questions. Their teams scored 10 points for each answer they matched.

=== Round 2 ===
In Round 2, the parents again left the stage and the older children answered four questions. The first three were worth 15 points, while the last was a "bonus" worth 25 points. When the parents returned, the father tried to match answers to the first three questions and both parents responded to the 25-point bonus question.

The family with the most points won the game and a grand prize. If there was a tie, it was broken in the same manner as on The Newlywed Game. Before the show, each family was asked to predict how many points they would score. The one closest to their actual score without going over was declared the winner.

== Merchandise ==
A board game based on the show was released by Hasbro at the time.

== Episode status ==
The Family Game is believed to have been erased ("wiped") due to network practices. Only two episodes are known to exist.

== Attempted revival ==
A revival was attempted in 1986 with Jeff MacGregor (who would go to host of The All-New Dating Game from 1987 to 1989), but the pilot was not picked up. This unsold pilot can be viewed at the UCLA Film and Television Archive, and a clip was also shown briefly in the Game Show Network original series, As Seen On.
