= The Honeymoon Race =

- Genre: game show
- Presented by: Bill Malone
- Country of origin: United States
- Original language: English

Production
- Production location: Hollywood, Florida
- Running time: 30 minutes

Original release
- Network: ABC
- Release: July 17 – December 1, 1967

The Honeymoon Race is an American game show that aired on ABC during the daytime from July 17, 1967 to December 1, 1967.

== Format ==
The Honeymoon Race consisted of newlywed couples who competed in a race at Hollywood Mall in Florida. The contestants got from one store to another on golf carts. In early episodes, the couples tried to earn time in a pricing round for a scavenger hunt, with the couple who found the most items in the fastest time winning prizes. This was later changed to a stunt race with the couples won prizes depending on how they finished the race. In either case, each episode consisted of two games with three couples competing in each game.
