= The Children's Doctor =

- Presented by: Dr. Lendon Smith, M.D.
- Country of origin: United States

Production
- Running time: 5 minutes (3.5 minus commercials)

Original release
- Network: ABC
- Release: April 1967 – August 1969

The Children's Doctor is an American daytime medical and parental advice program that ran on ABC for 3 years, from April 1967 to August 1969. It was produced at the studios of KGW-TV in Portland (an NBC affiliate; KATU was/is the market's ABC affiliate during this period) where the program was broadcast for a time locally before ABC picked it up for national broadcast.

== Series background ==
The program was hosted by Dr. Lendon Smith M.D., who gave advice everyday on topics ranging from how to discipline children to proper nutrition and would feature young children and their parents in his shows. Each program would begin with Dr. Smith saying "Hello. Today I'd like to talk about..." before going into the topic of the day. Smith taped a total of 10 segments in two hours.

== Production notes ==
Smith noted that at times that most of the children that appeared on the show would cause mischief both on and off-camera. He also used no scripts, relying on a few notes.

== Schedule ==
When it debuted, it aired at 10:55 am, but in the winter of 1968 it was moved to 2:55 pm where it would be paired with another ABC program, The Baby Game. It would later be shuffled two more times, to 1:55 pm in the summer of 1968 and to 12:55 pm in the Winter of 1969 (in both cases following Funny You Should Ask), where it remained until it was cancelled in August of that year.
