= 1970–71 United States network television schedule (daytime) =

The following is the 1970–71 daytime network television schedule for the three major English-language commercial broadcast networks in the United States. It covers the weekday and weekend daytime hours from September 1970 to August 1971.

== Legend ==
- Light yellow indicates talk shows.
- Green indicates soap operas.
- Pink indicates game shows.
- Gold indicates news and public affairs programming.
- Light teal indicates sporting events.
- White indicates local programming.
- Light purple indicates children's programming.
- Gray indicates encore programming (e.g., reruns of prime-time programming).
- New series are highlighted in **bold**.

== Schedule ==
- All times correspond to U.S. Eastern and Pacific Time scheduling (except for some live sports or events). Except where affiliates slot certain programs outside their network-dictated timeslots, subtract one hour for Central, Mountain, Alaska, and Hawaii-Aleutian times.
- Local schedules may differ, as affiliates have the option to pre-empt or delay network programs. Such scheduling may be limited to preemptions caused by local or national breaking news or weather coverage (which may force stations to tape delay certain programs to other timeslots) and any major sports events scheduled to air in a weekday timeslot (mainly during major holidays). Stations may air shows at other times at their preference.
- ABC had a 6PM (ET)/5PM (CT) feed for their newscast, depending on stations' schedule.

=== Monday-Friday ===
Network		6:00 am	6:30 am	7:00 am	7:30 am	8:00 am	8:30 am	9:00 am	9:30 am	10:00 am	10:30 am	11:00 am	11:30 am	noon	12:30 pm	1:00 pm	1:30 pm	2:00 pm	2:30 pm	3:00 pm	3:30 pm	4:00 pm	4:30 pm	5:00 pm	5:30 pm	6:00 pm	6:30 pm
ABC	Fall	Local/syndicated programming											That Girl	Bewitched	A World Apart	All My Children	Let's Make a Deal	The Newlywed Game	The Dating Game	General Hospital	One Life to Live	Dark Shadows	Local/syndicated programming				ABC News
ABC	Spring	Local/syndicated programming											That Girl	Bewitched	A World Apart	All My Children	Let's Make a Deal	The Newlywed Game	The Dating Game	General Hospital	One Life to Live	**Password**	Local/syndicated programming				ABC News
ABC	Summer	Local/syndicated programming											That Girl	Bewitched	**Love, American Style**	All My Children	Let's Make a Deal	The Newlywed Game	The Dating Game	General Hospital	One Life to Live	**Password**	Local/syndicated programming				ABC News
CBS		Sunrise Semester	Local/syndicated programming	CBS Morning News		Captain Kangaroo		Local/syndicated programming		The Lucy Show	The Beverly Hillbillies	**Family Affair**	Love of Life	Where the Heart Is CBS News (12:25)	Search for Tomorrow	Local/syndicated programming	As the World Turns	Love Is a Many Splendored Thing	The Guiding Light	The Secret Storm	The Edge of Night	Gomer Pyle, U.S.M.C.	Local/syndicated programming				CBS Evening News
NBC	Fall	Local/syndicated programming		Today				Local/syndicated programming		Dinah's Place	Concentration	Sale of the Century	Hollywood Squares	Jeopardy!	The Who, What, or Where Game NBC News (12:55)	Local/syndicated programming	**Words and Music**	Days of Our Lives	The Doctors	Another World	Bright Promise	Somerset	Local/syndicated programming				NBC Nightly News
NBC	Winter	Local/syndicated programming		Today				Local/syndicated programming		Dinah's Place	Concentration	Sale of the Century	Hollywood Squares	Jeopardy!	The Who, What, or Where Game NBC News (12:55)	Local/syndicated programming	**Joe Garagiola's Memory Game**	Days of Our Lives	The Doctors	Another World	Bright Promise	Somerset	Local/syndicated programming				NBC Nightly News
NBC	Summer	Local/syndicated programming		Today				Local/syndicated programming		Dinah's Place	Concentration	Sale of the Century	Hollywood Squares	Jeopardy!	The Who, What, or Where Game NBC News (12:55)	Local/syndicated programming	**Three on a Match**	Days of Our Lives	The Doctors	Another World	Bright Promise	Somerset	Local/syndicated programming				NBC Nightly News

=== Saturday ===
Network		7:00 am	7:30 am	8:00 am	8:30 am	9:00 am	9:30 am	10:00 am	10:30 am	11:00 am	11:30 am	noon	12:30 pm	1:00 pm	1:30 pm	2:00 pm	2:30 pm	3:00 pm	3:30 pm	4:00 pm	4:30 pm	5:00 pm	5:30 pm	6:00 pm	6:30 pm
ABC	Fall	Local and/or syndicated programming		**The Reluctant Dragon & Mr. Toad Show**	**Motormouse**	**Lancelot Link, Secret Chimp**		**Will the Real Jerry Lewis Please Sit Down**	**Here Come the Double Deckers**	Hot Wheels (R)	Skyhawks (R)	The Hardy Boys (R)	American Bandstand		ABC Sports and/or local programming										
ABC	February	Local and/or syndicated programming				**Lancelot Link, Secret Chimp**		**Will the Real Jerry Lewis Please Sit Down**	**Here Come the Double Deckers**	Hot Wheels (R)	Skyhawks (R)	Motormouse	The Hardy Boys (R)	American Bandstand		ABC Sports and/or local programming									
CBS		Local and/or syndicated programming		The Bugs Bunny/Road Runner Hour		**Sabrina and the Groovie Goolies**		**Josie and the Pussycats**	**Harlem Globetrotters**	**Archie's Funhouse**		Scooby-Doo, Where Are You!	The Monkees (R)	Dastardly and Muttley in Their Flying Machines (R)	The Jetsons (R)	CBS Sports and/or local programming									CBS Evening News
NBC	Fall	Local and/or syndicated programming		The Heckle and Jeckle Show	The Woody Woodpecker Show	**The Tomfoolery Show**	**The Bugaloos**	**The Further Adventures of Dr. Dolittle**	The Pink Panther Show	H.R. Pufnstuf (R)	Here Comes the Grump (R)	**Hot Dog**	Jambo	NBC Sports and/or local programming											NBC Saturday Night News
NBC	Winter	Local and/or syndicated programming		The Tomfoolery Show	The Heckle and Jeckle Show	The Woody Woodpecker Show	**The Bugaloos**	**The Further Adventures of Dr. Dolittle**	The Pink Panther Show	H.R. Pufnstuf (R)	Here Comes the Grump (R)	**Hot Dog**	Jambo	NBC Sports and/or local programming											NBC Saturday Night News

In the Know aired on CBS at 8:55 am, 9:55 am, 10:55 am, 11:55 am, and 12:55 pm.

=== Sunday ===
Network		7:00 am	7:30 am	8:00 am	8:30 am	9:00 am	9:30 am	10:00 am	10:30 am	11:00 am	11:30 am	noon	12:30 pm	1:00 pm	1:30 pm	2:00 pm	2:30 pm	3:00 pm	3:30 pm	4:00 pm	4:30 pm	5:00 pm	5:30 pm	6:00 pm	6:30 pm
ABC	Fall	Local and/or syndicated programming					The Smokey Bear Show (R)	Jonny Quest (R)	Cattanooga Cats (R)	The Bullwinkle Show (R)	Discovery	Local and/or syndicated programming		Directions	Issues and Answers	ABC Sports and/or local programming									
ABC	Summer	Local and/or syndicated programming					The Smokey Bear Show (R)	Jonny Quest (R)	Cattanooga Cats (R)	The Bullwinkle Show (R)	Discovery	Local and/or syndicated programming			Issues and Answers	ABC Sports and/or local programming									
CBS	Fall	Local and/or syndicated programming				Tom and Jerry (R)	The Perils of Penelope Pitstop (R)	Lamp Unto My Feet	Look Up and Live	Camera Three	Local and/or syndicated programming		Face the Nation	NFL on CBS and/or local programming											
CBS	November	Local and/or syndicated programming				Tom and Jerry (R)	The Perils of Penelope Pitstop (R)	Lamp Unto My Feet	Look Up and Live	Camera Three	Local and/or syndicated programming		Face the Nation	NFL on CBS and/or local programming										CBS Evening News	Local and/or syndicated programming
CBS	Winter	Local and/or syndicated programming				Tom and Jerry (R)	The Perils of Penelope Pitstop (R)	Lamp Unto My Feet	Look Up and Live	Camera Three	Local and/or syndicated programming		Face the Nation	CBS Sports and/or local programming									Animal World	CBS Evening News	Local and/or syndicated programming
CBS	Summer	Local and/or syndicated programming				Tom and Jerry (R)	The Perils of Penelope Pitstop (R)	Lamp Unto My Feet	Look Up and Live	Camera Three	Local and/or syndicated programming		Face the Nation	CBS Sports and/or local programming									Where's Huddles?	CBS Evening News	Local and/or syndicated programming
NBC	Fall	Local and/or syndicated programming											Meet the Press	NBC Sports and/or local programming											NBC Sunday Night News
NBC	Winter	Local and/or syndicated programming												Meet the Press	Speaking Freely		NBC Sports and/or local programming							Comment	NBC Sunday Night News

== By network ==
=== ABC ===
**Returning series**

- ABC Evening News
- All My Children
- American Bandstand
- Bewitched (reruns)
- The Bullwinkle Show (reruns)
- Cattanooga Cats (reruns)
- Dark Shadows
- The Dating Game
- Discovery
- General Hospital
- The Hardy Boys (reruns)
- Hot Wheels
- Issues and Answers
- Jonny Quest (reruns)
- Let's Make a Deal
- Motormouse
- The Newlywed Game
- One Life to Live
- Skyhawks
- The Smokey Bear Show
- That Girl (reruns)
- A World Apart

**New series**

- **Here Come the Double Deckers**
- **Lancelot Link, Secret Chimp**
- **Love, American Style** (reruns)
- **Password**
- **The Reluctant Dragon & Mr. Toad Show**
- **Will the Real Jerry Lewis Please Sit Down**

**Not returning from 1969-70**

- The Adventures of Gulliver (reruns)
- The Best of Everything
- Dream House returned in 1983 on NBC
- The Dudley Do-Right Show
- Fantastic Four (reruns)
- Fantastic Voyage (reruns)
- George of the Jungle (reruns)
- Get it Together
- The Hardy Boys
- The New Casper Cartoon Show
- Spider-Man

=== CBS ===
**Returning series**

- Archie's Funhouse
- As the World Turns
- The Beverly Hillbillies (reruns)
- The Bugs Bunny/Road Runner Hour
- Camera Three
- Captain Kangaroo
- CBS Evening News
- CBS Morning News
- Dastardly and Muttley in Their Flying Machines (reruns)
- The Edge of Night
- Face the Nation
- Gomer Pyle, USMC (reruns)
- The Guiding Light
- The Jetsons (reruns)
- Lamp Unto My Feet
- Look Up and Live
- Love Is a Many Splendored Thing
- Love of Life
- The Lucy Show (reruns)
- The Monkees (reruns)
- The Perils of Penelope Pitstop (reruns)
- Scooby-Doo, Where Are You!
- Search for Tomorrow
- The Secret Storm
- Sunrise Semester
- Tom and Jerry (reruns)
- Where the Heart Is

**New series**

- **Family Affair** (reruns)
- **Groovie Goolies**
- **Harlem Globetrotters**
- **Josie and the Pussycats**
- **Sabrina the Teenage Witch**

**Not returning from 1969-70**

- The Adventures of Batman (reruns)
- The Andy Griffith Show (reruns)
- The New Adventures of Superman
- Ted Mack's Amateur Hour
- Wacky Races

=== NBC ===
**Returning series**

- Another World
- Bright Promise
- Concentration
- Days of Our Lives
- Dinah's Place
- The Doctors
- H.R. Pufnstuf (reruns)
- The Heckle and Jeckle Cartoon Show
- Here Comes the Grump (reruns)
- Hollywood Squares
- Jambo
- Jeopardy!
- Meet the Press
- NBC Nightly News
- NBC Saturday Night News
- NBC Sunday Night News
- The Pink Panther Show
- Sale of the Century
- Somerset
- Today
- The Who, What, or Where Game
- The Woody Woodpecker Show (reruns)

**New series**

- **The Bugaloos**
- **The Further Adventures of Dr. Dolittle**
- **Hot Dog**
- **Joe Garagiola's Memory Game**
- **Three on a Match**
- **The Tomfoolery Show**
- **Words and Music**

**Not returning from 1969-70**

- The Banana Splits Adventure Hour
- The Flintstones
- Frontiers of Faith
- The Huntley-Brinkley Report
- It Takes Two
- Letters to Laugh-In
- Life with Linkletter
- Lohman & Barkley's Name Droppers
- You're Putting Me On

== See also ==
- 1970-71 United States network television schedule (prime-time)
- 1970-71 United States network television schedule (late night)
