= 1971–72 United States network television schedule (daytime) =

The following is the 1971–72 daytime network television schedule for the three major English-language commercial broadcast networks in the United States. It covers the weekday and weekend daytime hours from September 1971 to August 1972.

== Legend ==
- Light yellow indicates talk shows.
- Green indicates soap operas.
- Pink indicates game shows.
- Gold indicates news and public affairs programming.
- Light teal indicates sporting events.
- White indicates local programming.
- Light purple indicates children's programming.
- Gray indicates encore programming (e.g., reruns of prime-time programming).
- New series are highlighted in **bold**.

== Schedule ==
- All times correspond to U.S. Eastern and Pacific Time scheduling (except for some live sports or events). Except where affiliates slot certain programs outside their network-dictated timeslots, subtract one hour for Central, Mountain, Alaska, and Hawaii-Aleutian times.
- Local schedules may differ, as affiliates have the option to pre-empt or delay network programs. Such scheduling may be limited to preemptions caused by local or national breaking news or weather coverage (which may force stations to tape delay certain programs to other timeslots) and any major sports events scheduled to air in a weekday timeslot (mainly during major holidays). Stations may air shows at other times at their preference.
- ABC had a 6PM (ET)/5PM (CT) feed for their newscast, depending on stations' schedule

=== Monday-Friday ===
Network		6:00 am	6:30 am	7:00 am	7:30 am	8:00 am	8:30 am	9:00 am	9:30 am	10:00 am	10:30 am	11:00 am	11:30 am	noon	12:30 pm	1:00 pm	1:30 pm	2:00 pm	2:30 pm	3:00 pm	3:30 pm	4:00 pm	4:30 pm	5:00 pm	5:30 pm	6:00 pm	6:30 pm
ABC	Fall	Local/syndicated programming											That Girl	Bewitched	Password	All My Children	Let's Make a Deal	The Newlywed Game	The Dating Game	General Hospital	One Life to Live	Love, American Style	Local/syndicated programming				ABC News
ABC	Spring	Local/syndicated programming											Bewitched	Password	**Split Second**	All My Children	Let's Make a Deal	The Newlywed Game	The Dating Game	General Hospital	One Life to Live	Love, American Style	Local/syndicated programming				ABC News
CBS	Fall	Sunrise Semester	Local/syndicated programming	CBS Morning News		Captain Kangaroo		Local/syndicated programming		The Lucy Show	The Beverly Hillbillies	Family Affair	Love of Life	Where the Heart Is CBS News (12:25)	Search for Tomorrow	Local/syndicated programming	As the World Turns	Love is a Many Splendored Thing	The Guiding Light	The Secret Storm	The Edge of Night	Gomer Pyle, U.S.M.C.	Local/syndicated programming				CBS Evening News
CBS	Winter	Sunrise Semester	Local/syndicated programming	CBS Morning News		Captain Kangaroo		Local/syndicated programming		The Lucy Show	**My Three Sons**	Family Affair	Love of Life	Where the Heart Is CBS News (12:25)	Search for Tomorrow	Local/syndicated programming	As the World Turns	Love is a Many Splendored Thing	The Guiding Light	The Secret Storm	The Edge of Night	Gomer Pyle, U.S.M.C.	Local/syndicated programming				CBS Evening News
CBS	Spring	Sunrise Semester	Local/syndicated programming	CBS Morning News		Captain Kangaroo		Local/syndicated programming		The Lucy Show	**My Three Sons**	Family Affair	Love of Life	Where the Heart Is CBS News (12:25)	Search for Tomorrow	Local/syndicated programming	As the World Turns	Love is a Many Splendored Thing	The Guiding Light	The Secret Storm	The Edge of Night	**The Amateur's Guide to Love**	Local/syndicated programming				CBS Evening News
CBS	Summer	Sunrise Semester	Local/syndicated programming	CBS Morning News		Captain Kangaroo		Local/syndicated programming		The Lucy Show	The Beverly Hillbillies	Family Affair	Love of Life	Where the Heart Is CBS News (12:25)	Search for Tomorrow	Local/syndicated programming	As the World Turns	Love is a Many Splendored Thing	The Guiding Light	The Secret Storm	The Edge of Night	My Three Sons	Local/syndicated programming				CBS Evening News
NBC	Fall	Local/syndicated programming		Today				Local/syndicated programming		Dinah's Place	Concentration	Sale of the Century	The Hollywood Squares	Jeopardy!	The Who, What, or Where Game NBC News (12:55)	Local/syndicated programming	Three on a Match	Days of Our Lives	The Doctors	Another World	Bright Promise	Somerset	Local/syndicated programming				NBC Nightly News
NBC	Spring	Local/syndicated programming		Today				Local/syndicated programming		Dinah's Place	Concentration	Sale of the Century	The Hollywood Squares	Jeopardy!	The Who, What, or Where Game NBC News (12:55)	Local/syndicated programming	Three on a Match	Days of Our Lives	The Doctors	Another World	**Return to Peyton Place**	Somerset	Local/syndicated programming				NBC Nightly News

=== Saturday ===
Network		7:00 am	7:30 am	8:00 am	8:30 am	9:00 am	9:30 am	10:00 am	10:30 am	11:00 am	11:30 am	noon	12:30 pm	1:00 pm	1:30 pm	2:00 pm	2:30 pm	3:00 pm	3:30 pm	4:00 pm	4:30 pm	5:00 pm	5:30 pm	6:00 pm	6:30 pm
ABC		Local and/or syndicated programming		Will the Real Jerry Lewis Please Sit Down (R)	**The Road Runner Show**	**The Funky Phantom**	**The Jackson 5ive**	Bewitched	**Lidsville**	**Curiosity Shop**		Jonny Quest	Lancelot Link, Secret Chimp (R)	American Bandstand		ABC Sports and/or local programming									
CBS		Local and/or syndicated programming		The Bugs Bunny Show	Scooby-Doo, Where Are You! (R)	Harlem Globetrotters	**Help!... It's the Hair Bear Bunch!**	**The Pebbles and Bamm-Bamm Show**	Archie's TV Funnies	Sabrina the Teenage Witch (R)	Josie and the Pussycats (R)	The Monkees	**You Are There**	**CBS Children's Film Festival**		CBS Sports and/or local programming								CBS Evening News	Local and/or syndicated programming
NBC	Fall	Local and/or syndicated programming		The Further Adventures of Dr. Dolittle (R)	The Woody Woodpecker Show	**Deputy Dawg**	The New Pink Panther Show	**Barrier Reef**	**Take a Giant Step**		The Bugaloos	**Mr. Wizard**	The Jetsons	NBC Sports and/or local programming										Local and/or syndicated programming	NBC Saturday Night News
NBC	Winter	Local and/or syndicated programming		The Further Adventures of Dr. Dolittle (R)	Deputy Dawg	The Woody Woodpecker Show	The New Pink Panther Show	The Jetsons	Barrier Reef	Take a Giant Step		**Mr. Wizard**	The Bugaloos	NBC Sports and/or local programming										Local and/or syndicated programming	NBC Saturday Night News

In the News aired after all of CBS's Saturday morning shows, except The Bugs Bunny Show, You Are There, and CBS Children's Film Festival.

=== Sunday ===
Network		7:00 am	7:30 am	8:00 am	8:30 am	9:00 am	9:30 am	10:00 am	10:30 am	11:00 am	11:30 am	noon	12:30 pm	1:00 pm	1:30 pm	2:00 pm	2:30 pm	3:00 pm	3:30 pm	4:00 pm	4:30 pm	5:00 pm	5:30 pm	6:00 pm	6:30 pm
ABC		Local and/or syndicated programming						The Reluctant Dragon and Mr. Toad Show	Here Come the Double Deckers	The Bullwinkle Show	**Make a Wish**	Local and/or syndicated programming			Issues and Answers	ABC Sports and/or local programming									
CBS	Fall	Local and/or syndicated programming				Tom and Jerry	Groovie Goolies	Lamp Unto My Feet	Look Up and Live	Camera Three	Face the Nation	NFL on CBS and/or local programming													
CBS	Winter	Local and/or syndicated programming				Tom and Jerry	Groovie Goolies	Lamp Unto My Feet	Look Up and Live	Camera Three	Face the Nation	CBS Sports and/or local programming												60 Minutes	
CBS	Summer	Local and/or syndicated programming				Tom and Jerry	Groovie Goolies	Lamp Unto My Feet	Look Up and Live	Camera Three	Face the Nation	CBS Sports and/or local programming												Local and/or syndicated programming	CBS Evening News
NBC	Fall	Local and/or syndicated programming											Meet the Press	NBC Sports and/or local programming										Local and/or syndicated programming	NBC Sunday Night News
NBC	Spring	Local and/or syndicated programming												Meet the Press	NBC Sports and/or local programming									Local and/or syndicated programming	NBC Sunday Night News

== By network ==
=== ABC ===
**Returning Series**

- ABC Evening News
- All My Children
- American Bandstand
- Bewitched (reruns)
- The Bullwinkle Show
- The Dating Game
- General Hospital
- Here Come the Double Deckers (reruns)
- Issues and Answers
- Jonny Quest (reruns)
- Lancelot Link, Secret Chimp (reruns)
- Let's Make a Deal
- Love, American Style (reruns)
- The Newlywed Game
- One Life to Live
- Password
- The Reluctant Dragon and Mr. Toad Show (reruns)
- That Girl (reruns)
- Will the Real Jerry Lewis Please Sit Down (reruns)

**New Series**

- **Curiosity Shop**
- **The Funky Phantom**
- **The Jackson 5ive**
- **Lidsville**
- **Make a Wish**
- **The Road Runner Show**
- **Split Second**

**Not Returning From 1970-71**

- A World Apart
- Cattanooga Cats (reruns)
- Dark Shadows
- Discovery
- The Hardy Boys (reruns)
- Hot Wheels
- The Motormouse & AutoCat Show
- Skyhawks
- The Smokey Bear Show (reruns)

=== CBS ===
**Returning Series**

- Archie's TV Funnies
- As the World Turns
- The Beverly Hillbillies (reruns)
- The Bugs Bunny Show
- Camera Three
- Captain Kangaroo
- CBS Evening News
- CBS Morning News
- The Edge of Night
- Face the Nation
- Family Affair (reruns)
- Gomer Pyle, USMC (reruns)
- Groovie Goolies (reruns)
- The Guiding Light
- Harlem Globetrotters
- Josie and the Pussycats (reruns)
- Lamp Unto My Feet
- Look Up and Live
- Love is a Many Splendored Thing
- Love of Life
- The Lucy Show (reruns)
- The Monkees (reruns)
- Sabrina the Teenage Witch (reruns)
- Scooby-Doo, Where Are You! (reruns)
- Search for Tomorrow
- The Secret Storm
- Sunrise Semester
- Tom and Jerry (reruns)
- Where the Heart Is

**New Series**

- **The Amateur's Guide to Love**
- **CBS Children's Film Festival**
- **Help!... It's the Hair Bear Bunch!**
- **My Three Sons** (reruns)
- **The Pebbles and Bamm-Bamm Show**
- **You Are There**

**Not Returning From 1970-71**

- Dastardly and Muttley in Their Flying Machines (reruns)
- The Jetsons (reruns) (moved to NBC)
- The Perils of Penelope Pitstop (reruns)

=== NBC ===
**Returning Series**

- Another World
- Bright Promise
- The Bugaloos
- Concentration
- Dinah's Place
- Days of Our Lives
- Doctor Dolittle (reruns)
- The Doctors
- The Hollywood Squares
- Jeopardy!
- Meet the Press
- NBC Nightly News
- NBC Saturday Night News
- NBC Sunday Night News
- The New Pink Panther Show
- Sale of the Century
- Somerset
- Three on a Match
- Today
- The Who, What, or Where Game
- The Woody Woodpecker Show (reruns)

**New Series**

- **Barrier Reef**
- **Deputy Dawg** (reruns)
- **The Jetsons** (reruns)
- **Mr. Wizard**
- **Return to Peyton Place**
- **Take a Giant Step**

**Not Returning From 1970-71**

- The Heckle and Jeckle Cartoon Show
- Here Comes the Grump (reruns)
- Hot Dog
- H.R. Pufnstuf (reruns)
- Jambo
- Joe Garagiola's Memory Game
- The Tomfoolery Show
- Words and Music

== See also ==
- 1971-72 United States network television schedule (prime-time)
- 1971-72 United States network television schedule (late night)
