= 1969–70 United States network television schedule (daytime) =

The following is the 1969–70 daytime network television schedule for the three major English-language commercial broadcast networks in the United States. It covers the weekday and weekend daytime hours from September 1969 to August 1970.

== Legend ==
- Light yellow indicates talk shows.
- Green indicates soap operas.
- Pink indicates game shows.
- Gold indicates news and public affairs programming.
- Light teal indicates sporting events.
- White indicates local programming.
- Light purple indicates children's programming.
- Gray indicates encore programming (e.g., reruns of prime-time programming).
- New series are highlighted in **bold**.

== Schedule ==
- All times correspond to U.S. Eastern and Pacific Time scheduling (except for some live sports or events). Except where affiliates slot certain programs outside their network-dictated timeslots, subtract one hour for Central, Mountain, Alaska, and Hawaii-Aleutian times.
- Local schedules may differ, as affiliates have the option to pre-empt or delay network programs. Such scheduling may be limited to preemptions caused by local or national breaking news or weather coverage (which may force stations to tape delay certain programs to other timeslots) and any major sports events scheduled to air in a weekday timeslot (mainly during major holidays). Stations may air shows at other times at their preference.
- ABC had a 6PM (ET)/5PM (CT) feed for their newscast, depending on stations' schedule.

=== Monday-Friday ===
Network		6:00 am	6:30 am	7:00 am	7:30 am	8:00 am	8:30 am	9:00 am	9:30 am	10:00 am	10:30 am	11:00 am	11:30 am	noon	12:30 pm	1:00 pm	1:30 pm	2:00 pm	2:30 pm	3:00 pm	3:30 pm	4:00 pm	4:30 pm	5:00 pm	5:30 pm	6:00 pm	6:30 pm
ABC	Fall	Local/syndicated programming												Bewitched	That Girl	Dream House	Let's Make a Deal	The Newlywed Game	The Dating Game	General Hospital	One Life to Live	Dark Shadows	Local/syndicated programming			ABC News	Local/syndicated programming
ABC	Winter	Local/syndicated programming												Bewitched	That Girl	**All My Children**	Let's Make a Deal	The Newlywed Game	The Dating Game	General Hospital	One Life to Live	Dark Shadows	Local/syndicated programming			ABC News	Local/syndicated programming
ABC	Spring	Local/syndicated programming										Bewitched	That Girl	**The Best of Everything**	**A World Apart**	**All My Children**	Let's Make a Deal	The Newlywed Game	The Dating Game	General Hospital	One Life to Live	Dark Shadows	Local/syndicated programming			ABC News	Local/syndicated programming
CBS		Sunrise Semester	Local/syndicated programming	CBS Morning News		Captain Kangaroo		Local/syndicated programming		The Lucy Show	The Beverly Hillbillies	The Andy Griffith Show	Love of Life	**Where the Heart Is** CBS News (12:25)	Search for Tomorrow	Local/syndicated programming	As the World Turns	Love Is a Many Splendored Thing	The Guiding Light	The Secret Storm	The Edge of Night	**Gomer Pyle, U.S.M.C.**	Local/syndicated programming				CBS Evening News
NBC	Fall	Local/syndicated programming		Today				Local/syndicated programming		It Takes Two	Concentration	**Sale of the Century**	Hollywood Squares	Jeopardy!	**Lohman & Barkley's Name Droppers** NBC News (12:55)	Local/syndicated programming	You're Putting Me On	Days of Our Lives	The Doctors	Another World	**Bright Promise**	**Letters to Laugh-In**	Local/syndicated programming				The Huntley–Brinkley Report
NBC	Winter	Local/syndicated programming		Today				Local/syndicated programming		It Takes Two	Concentration	**Sale of the Century**	Hollywood Squares	Jeopardy!	**The Who, What, or Where Game** NBC News (12:55)	Local/syndicated programming	**Life with Linkletter**	Days of Our Lives	The Doctors	Another World	**Bright Promise**	Lohman & Barkley's Name Droppers	Local/syndicated programming				The Huntley–Brinkley Report
NBC	Spring	Local/syndicated programming		Today				Local/syndicated programming		It Takes Two	Concentration	**Sale of the Century**	Hollywood Squares	Jeopardy!	**The Who, What, or Where Game** NBC News (12:55)	Local/syndicated programming	**Life with Linkletter**	Days of Our Lives	The Doctors	Another World in Bay City	**Bright Promise**	**Another World in Somerset**	Local/syndicated programming				The Huntley–Brinkley Report
NBC	Summer	Local/syndicated programming		Today				Local/syndicated programming		**Dinah's Place**	Concentration	**Sale of the Century**	Hollywood Squares	Jeopardy!	**The Who, What, or Where Game** NBC News (12:55)	Local/syndicated programming	**Life with Linkletter**	Days of Our Lives	The Doctors	Another World in Bay City	**Bright Promise**	**Another World in Somerset**	Local/syndicated programming				**NBC Nightly News** (August)

=== Saturday ===
Network		6:00 am	6:30 am	7:00 am	7:30 am	8:00 am	8:30 am	9:00 am	9:30 am	10:00 am	10:30 am	11:00 am	11:30 am	noon	12:30 pm	1:00 pm	1:30 pm	2:00 pm	2:30 pm	3:00 pm	3:30 pm	4:00 pm	4:30 pm	5:00 pm	5:30 pm	6:00 pm	6:30 pm
ABC	Fall	Local and/or syndicated programming				The New Casper Cartoon Show (R)	**The Smokey Bear Show**	The Cattanooga Cats Show		**Hot Wheels**	**The Hardy Boys**	**Skyhawks**	The Adventures of Gulliver (R)	Fantastic Voyage (R)	The New American Bandstand 1970		Happening	ABC Sports and/or local programming									
ABC	October	Local and/or syndicated programming				The New Casper Cartoon Show (R)	**The Smokey Bear Show**	The Cattanooga Cats Show		**Hot Wheels**	**The Hardy Boys**	**Skyhawks**	The Adventures of Gulliver (R)	Fantastic Voyage (R)	The New American Bandstand 1970		ABC Sports and/or local programming										
ABC	Winter	Local and/or syndicated programming				The Adventures of Gulliver (R)	**The Smokey Bear Show**	The Cattanooga Cats Show		**Hot Wheels**	**The Hardy Boys**	**Skyhawks**	George of the Jungle (R)	**Get It Together**	The New American Bandstand 1970		ABC Sports and/or local programming										
CBS	Fall	Local and/or syndicated programming	Sunrise Semester	Local and/or syndicated programming		The Jetsons (R)	The Bugs Bunny/Road Runner Hour		Dastardly and Muttley in Their Flying Machines	**The Perils of Penelope Pitstop**	**Scooby-Doo, Where Are You!**	The Archie Comedy Hour		The Monkees (R)	Wacky Races (R)	The New Adventures of Superman (R)	Jonny Quest (R)	CBS Sports and/or local programming									CBS Evening News
CBS	Spring	Local and/or syndicated programming	Sunrise Semester	Local and/or syndicated programming		The Jetsons (R)	The Bugs Bunny/Road Runner Hour		Dastardly and Muttley in Their Flying Machines	Wacky Races (R)	**Scooby-Doo, Where Are You!**	The Archie Comedy Hour		The Monkees (R)	The Perils of Penelope Pitstop	The New Adventures of Superman (R)	Jonny Quest (R)	CBS Sports and/or local programming									CBS Evening News
CBS	Summer	Local and/or syndicated programming	Summer Semester	Local and/or syndicated programming		The Jetsons (R)	The Bugs Bunny/Road Runner Hour		Dastardly and Muttley in Their Flying Machines	Wacky Races (R)	**Scooby-Doo, Where Are You!**	The Archie Comedy Hour		The Monkees (R)	The Perils of Penelope Pitstop	The New Adventures of Superman (R)	Jonny Quest (R)	CBS Sports and/or local programming									CBS Evening News
NBC	Fall	Local and/or syndicated programming				The Heckle and Jeckle Cartoon Show		Here Comes the Grump	The Pink Panther Show	**H.R. Pufnstuf**	The Banana Splits Adventure Hour		**Jambo**	The Flintstones (R)	The Underdog Show (R)	NBC Sports and/or local programming		Speaking Freely		NBC Sports and/or local programming					College Bowl	Local and/or syndicated programming	The Huntley–Brinkley Report
NBC	Winter	Local and/or syndicated programming				The Heckle and Jeckle Cartoon Show		Here Comes the Grump	The Pink Panther Show	**H.R. Pufnstuf**	The Banana Splits Adventure Hour		**Jambo**	The Flintstones (R)	The Underdog Show (R)	NBC Sports and/or local programming											The Huntley–Brinkley Report
NBC	Spring	Local and/or syndicated programming				The Heckle and Jeckle Cartoon Show		Here Comes the Grump	The Pink Panther Show	**H.R. Pufnstuf**	The Banana Splits Adventure Hour		The Flintstones (R)	Jambo	The Underdog Show (R)	NBC Sports and/or local programming											The Huntley–Brinkley Report
NBC	August	Local and/or syndicated programming				The Heckle and Jeckle Cartoon Show		Here Comes the Grump	The Pink Panther Show	**H.R. Pufnstuf**	The Banana Splits Adventure Hour		Jambo	The Flintstones (R)	The Underdog Show (R)	NBC Sports and/or local programming											**NBC Nightly News**

=== Sunday ===
Network		7:00 am	7:30 am	8:00 am	8:30 am	9:00 am	9:30 am	10:00 am	10:30 am	11:00 am	11:30 am	noon	12:30 pm	1:00 pm	1:30 pm	2:00 pm	2:30 pm	3:00 pm	3:30 pm	4:00 pm	4:30 pm	5:00 pm	5:30 pm	6:00 pm	6:30 pm
ABC	Fall	Local and/or syndicated programming					The Dudley Do-Right Show (R)	George of the Jungle (R)	Fantastic Four (R)	The Bullwinkle Show (R)	Discovery	Local and/or syndicated programming		Directions	Issues and Answers	ABC Sports and/or local programming									
ABC	Winter	Local and/or syndicated programming					The Dudley Do-Right Show (R)	Fantastic Voyage (R)	Spider-Man	The Bullwinkle Show (R)	Discovery	Local and/or syndicated programming		Directions	Issues and Answers	ABC Sports and/or local programming									
ABC	Summer	Local and/or syndicated programming					The Dudley Do-Right Show (R)	Fantastic Voyage (R)	Spider-Man	The Bullwinkle Show (R)	Discovery	Local and/or syndicated programming			Issues and Answers	ABC Sports and/or local programming									
CBS	Fall	Local and/or syndicated programming				Tom and Jerry (R)	The Adventures of Batman (R)	Lamp Unto My Feet	Look Up and Live	Camera Three	Face the Nation	CBS Sports and/or local programming													
CBS	Winter	Local and/or syndicated programming				Tom and Jerry (R)	The Adventures of Batman (R)	Lamp Unto My Feet	Look Up and Live	Camera Three	Face the Nation	CBS Sports and/or local programming											Ted Mack's Amateur Hour	**CBS Evening News**	Local and/or syndicated programming
NBC	Fall	Local and/or syndicated programming										Youth Forum	Guideline / Eternal Light	Meet the Press	NBC Sports and/or local programming										
NBC	Winter	Local and/or syndicated programming										Youth Forum	local programming	Meet the Press	Guideline / Eternal Light / Frontiers of Faith	Speaking Freely		NBC Sports and/or local programming						The Frank McGee Report	College Bowl
NBC	May	Local and/or syndicated programming										Youth Forum	local programming	Meet the Press	Guideline / Eternal Light / Frontiers of Faith	Speaking Freely		NBC Sports and/or local programming					**In Which We Live**	The Frank McGee Report	College Bowl
NBC	Summer	Local and/or syndicated programming												Meet the Press	Guideline / Eternal Light / Frontiers of Faith	Speaking Freely		NBC Sports and/or local programming							

== By network ==
=== ABC ===
**Returning series**

- ABC News
- The Adventures of Gulliver
- Bewitched (reruns)
- The Bullwinkle Show
- Dark Shadows
- The Dating Game
- Discovery
- Dream House
- The Dudley Do-Right Show
- Fantastic Four
- Fantastic Voyage
- General Hospital
- George of the Jungle
- Happening
- Issues and Answers
- Let's Make a Deal
- The New American Bandstand 1970
- The New Casper Cartoon Show
- The Newlywed Game
- One Life to Live
- Spider-Man
- That Girl (reruns)

**New series**

- **A World Apart**
- **All My Children**
- **The Best of Everything**
- **The Cattanooga Cats Show**
- **Get It Together**
- **The Hardy Boys**
- **Hot Wheels**
- **Skyhawks**
- **The Smokey Bear Show**

**Not returning from 1968–69**

- The Children's Doctor
- The Dick Cavett Show
- Funny You Should Ask
- Journey to the Center of the Earth
- The King Kong Show (reruns)
- Linus the Lionhearted
- The New Beatles (reruns)
- Treasure Isle

=== CBS ===
**Returning series**

- The Adventures of Batman
- The Andy Griffith Show (reruns)
- As the World Turns
- The Beverly Hillbillies (reruns)
- The Bugs Bunny/Road Runner Hour
- Camera Three
- Captain Kangaroo
- CBS Evening News
- CBS Morning News
- CBS News
- The Edge of Night
- Face the Nation
- The Guiding Light
- The Jetsons (reruns)
- Jonny Quest (reruns)
- Lamp Unto My Feet
- Look Up and Live
- Love Is a Many Splendored Thing
- Love of Life
- The Lucy Show (reruns)
- The Monkees (reruns)
- The New Adventures of Superman
- Search for Tomorrow
- The Secret Storm
- Sunrise Semester
- Ted Mack's Amateur Hour
- Tom and Jerry
- Wacky Races

**New series**

- **Dastardly and Muttley in Their Flying Machines**
- **Gomer Pyle, USMC** (reruns)
- **The Perils of Penelope Pitstop**
- **Scooby Doo, Where Are You?**
- **Where the Heart Is**

**Not returning from 1968–69**

- Aquaman
- The Archie Show
- The Batman/Superman Hour
- The Dick Van Dyke Show (reruns)
- The Go Go Gophers Show
- The Herculoids (reruns)
- The Linkletter Show
- The Lone Ranger
- Moby Dick and the Mighty Mightor
- Shazzan

=== NBC ===
**Returning series**

- Another World
- Another World in Bay City
- The Banana Splits Adventure Hour
- Concentration
- Days of Our Lives
- The Doctors
- The Flintstones reruns
- Frontiers of Faith
- The Heckle and Jeckle Cartoon Show
- Hollywood Squares
- It Takes Two
- Jeopardy!
- Meet the Press
- NBC Saturday Night News
- NBC Sunday Night News
- Today
- You're Putting Me On

**New series**

- **Another World in Somerset**
- **Bright Promise**
- **Dinah's Place**
- **Here Comes the Grump**
- **H.R. Pufnstuf**
- **The Huntley-Brinkley Report**
- **Jambo**
- **Letters to Laugh-In**
- **Life with Linkletter**
- **Lohman and Barkley's Name Droppers**
- **NBC Nightly News**
- **The Pink Panther Show**
- **Sale of the Century**
- **The Who, What, or Where Game**

**Not returning from 1968–69**

- Birdman and the Galaxy Trio
- Cool McCool
- Eye Guess
- Hidden Faces
- The Match Game (returned in 1973 on CBS)
- Personality
- Snap Judgment
- Storybook Squares
- Super President
- The Super 6
- Top Cat reruns
- The Untamed World
- You Don't Say! (returned in 1975 on ABC)

== See also ==
- 1969-70 United States network television schedule (prime-time)
- 1969-70 United States network television schedule (late night)
