= All Monsters Attack =

1969 film by Ishirō Honda

- Theatrical release poster

Japanese name
- Kanji: ゴジラ・ミニラ・ガバラ オール怪獣大進撃
Transcriptions
- Revised Hepburn: Gojira Minira Gabara Ōru Kaijū Dai-shingeki
- Directed by: Ishirō Honda
- Screenplay by: Shinichi Sekizawa
- Produced by: Tomoyuki Tanaka
- Starring: Tomonori Yazaki; Kenji Sahara; Machiko Naka
- Cinematography: Mototaka Tomioka
- Edited by: Masahima Miyauchi
- Music by: Kunio Miyauchi
- Production company: Toho Co., Ltd
- Distributed by: Toho
- Release date: 20 December 1969
- Running time: 70 minutes
- Country: Japan
- Language: Japanese
- Box office: ¥260 million (Japan rentals)

All Monsters Attack (Japanese: ゴジラ・ミニラ・ガバラ オール怪獣大進撃, Hepburn: Gojira Minira Gabara Ōru Kaijū Dai-shingeki; lit. Godzilla, Minilla, and Gabara: All Monsters Attack) is a 1969 Japanese comedy kaiju film directed by Ishirō Honda, written by Shinichi Sekizawa, and produced by Tomoyuki Tanaka. The film, which was produced and distributed by Toho Co., Ltd, is the tenth film in the Godzilla series. The film stars Tomonori Yazaki, Kenji Sahara, and Hideyo Amamoto, with special effects by Honda and Teruyoshi Nakano, and features Haruo Nakajima as Godzilla, Masao Fukazawa as Minilla, and Yasuhiko Kakuyuki as Gabara.

All Monsters Attack was released theatrically in Japan on December 20, 1969. It received a theatrical release in the United States in 1971 by Maron Films, under the title Godzilla's Revenge, on a double bill with the 1967 film Night of the Big Heat. It has received generally negative reviews for its tone, characters and extensive use of stock footage from previous Godzilla films; many critics and audience retrospectively consider it to be one of the worst Godzilla films, although Honda viewed it as one of his favorites.

The film was followed by Godzilla vs. Hedorah, released on July 24, 1971.

== Plot ==
Ichiro Miki is a highly imaginative but lonely latchkey boy growing up in urban and polluted Kawasaki. Every day he comes home to his family's empty apartment. His only friends are a toymaker named Shinpei Minami and a young girl named Sachiko. Every day after school, Ichiro is tormented by a gang of bullies led by a child named Sanko Gabara.

To escape his loneliness, Ichiro sleeps and dreams about visiting Monster Island. During his visit, he witnesses Godzilla battle three Kamacuras —a form of giant mantis— brutally outpowering the three. Ichiro is then chased by a rogue Kamacuras and falls into a deep cave, but luckily avoids being caught by Kamacuras. Shortly afterwards, Ichiro is rescued from the cave by Godzilla's adopted child Minilla. Coincidentally, Ichiro quickly learns that Minilla has bully problems too, as it is bullied by a mutant amphibian monster known as Gabara.

Ichiro is then awoken by Shinpei who informs him that his mother Tamiko must work late again. Ichiro goes out to play, but is then frightened by the bullies and finds and explores an abandoned factory. After finding some souvenirs (tubes, a headset, and a wallet with someone's [necessarily the suspect's] license), Ichiro leaves the factory after hearing some sirens close by. After Ichiro leaves, two bank robbers who were hiding out in the factory learn that Ichiro has found one of their driver's licenses and follow him in order to kidnap him.

Later, after his dinner with Shinpei, Ichiro dreams again and reunites with Minilla. Together they both watch as Godzilla battles other monsters such as Ebirah, Kumonga, Giant Condor and some invading jets. Then in the middle of Godzilla's fights, Gabara appears and Minilla is forced to battle it, and after a short and one-on-one battle, Minilla runs away in fear. Godzilla returns to train Minilla how to fight and use its atomic breath. However, Ichiro is woken up this time by the bank robbers and is taken hostage as a means of protection from the authorities.

Out of fear and being watched by the bank robbers, Ichiro calls for Minilla's help and falls asleep again where he witnesses Minilla being beaten up by Gabara again. Finally, Ichiro helps Minilla fight back at Gabara and eventually, Minilla emerges victorious by catapulting Gabara through the air with a seesaw-like log. Godzilla, who was in the area watching comes to congratulate Minilla for his victory but is ambushed by a vengeful Gabara. Godzilla easily defeats and sends Gabara into retreat, never to bother Minilla again.

Now from his experiences in his dreams, Ichiro learns how to face his fears and fight back, gaining the courage to outwit the bank robbers just in time for the police, called by Shinpei, to arrive and arrest them. The next day, Ichiro stands up to Sanko and his gang and emerges victorious, regaining his pride and confidence in the process. He also gains their friendship when he plays a prank on a billboard painter.

== Cast ==
- Tomonori Yazaki as Ichiro Miki, the latchkey boy and one of the film's main protagonists. He is named after Ishirō Honda.
- Kenji Sahara as Kenichi Miki, Ichiro's father
- Machiko Naka as Tamiko Miki, Ichiro's mother
- Hideyo Amamoto as Shinpei Minami, the toymaker and one of Ichiro's friends
- Sachio Sakai as Sembayashi
- Kazuo Suzuki as Okuda
- Junichi Ito as Sanko Gabara, the boy who bullies Ichiro
- Hidemi Ito as Sachiko, the girl and one of Ichiro's friends
- Haruo Nakajima as Godzilla, the mutant dinosaurian creature and the film's secondary protagonist.
- Masao Fukazawa as Minilla, Godzilla's son and one of the film's main protagonists.
  - Midori Uchiyama as the voice of Minilla
- Yasuhiko Kakuyuki as Gabara, the mutant amphibian monster and the film's main antagonist

== Production ==
Ishirō Honda gives instructions to Minilla (Masao Fukazawa) and Ichiro Miki (Tomonori Yazaki), during filming.

Despite Destroy All Monsters initially having been planned as the final Godzilla film, not long thereafter Toho Studios entered negotiations with Filmation for an animated series based on the property that was intended for air during the 1969-70 television season. Although the deal collapsed, Toho's view of Godzilla as a children's property would dictate their approach to the series from then onward. Due to the economic situation in Japan at the time as well as a downward trajectory of movie going, Toho desired a new Godzilla movie which would be made cheaply, quickly, and be directed as a children's fantasy film. The film began production in October 1969 and was released in December of that year.

Due to production costs, All Monsters Attack includes extensive stock footage of Ebirah, Horror of the Deep, Son of Godzilla, King Kong Escapes, and Destroy All Monsters. The filmmakers also employed the same Godzilla suit used for Destroy All Monsters. Despite being credited as the film's special effects director, Eiji Tsuburaya was not actively involved with the production. Director Ishirō Honda not only directed the drama scenes but the special effects scenes as well, with assistance from Teruyoshi Nakano, who was a first assistant special effects director at the time. Honda would later confirm that Tsuburaya was given credit as the film's special effects director "out of respect", and the reason why Honda took over Tsuburaya's duties was due to "budget and time constraints". A small studio was used for the production, where both the special effects and drama scenes were filmed (usually the two were filmed in separate studios).

== Themes ==
Destroy All Monsters was released at a time when latchkey kids had become a rising social issue during the 1960s. Due to rising housing costs necessitating women taking jobs outside the home and a lack of widely available after school care, many children were often left to their own devices including dealing with bullies. Paralleling the situation of main character Ichiro, the anthropomorphized Minilla deals with its own bully in the form of the monster Gabara. It is likely that screenwriter Shinichi Sekizawa created Gabara's name (originally spelled "Gebara") either from Che Guevara or the German word gewalt, meaning violence, as both were prevalent motifs among student protesters of the time.

== Release ==
All Monsters Attack was released theatrically in Japan on 20 December 1969 where it was distributed by Toho. The film was the first "Toho Champion Matsuri", a festival-style program that included shorts and feature films.

The film had been test-screened under the title Minya, Son of Godzilla in the United States. The version was edited further and released with an English-language dubbed version in 1971 under the title Godzilla's Revenge. This version of the film was distributed by Maron Films as a double feature with Island of the Burning Damned.

=== Home media ===
The film was released on home video in the United States in 2007 by Classic Media with its original Japanese version.

In 2019, the Japanese version was included in a Blu-ray box set released by The Criterion Collection, which included all 15 films from the series' Shōwa era.

=== U.S. release ===
The film was released in the United States in 1971 under the title Godzilla's Revenge, with the film being dubbed by Riley Jackson. One change from the film was the removal of the song "Monster March" by Lilly Sasaki and the Tokyo Children's Choir.

== Critical response ==
The film is commonly regarded by critics and fans as being one of the worst Godzilla films, with many criticizing the film's tone, characters, and overwhelming use of stock footage. On the review aggregator website Rotten Tomatoes, 29% of 7 critics' reviews are positive, with an average rating of 4.7/10.

Nicholas Raymond of Screen Rant named All Monsters Attack the worst Godzilla film, referring to it as "universally disliked by Godzilla fans, and for good reason".

Matthew Jackson of Looper.com ranked the film among the worst Godzilla films, criticizing its usage of stock footage, referring to Minilla as "annoying", and writing that "There's nothing necessarily wrong with the premise, but the execution leaves a lot to be desired".

Jacob Knight of /Film ranked the film as the 27th best Godzilla movie out of 31 films, writing that "While it's almost universally accepted that Godzilla's Revenge is the 'worst' Godzilla movie by enthusiasts, there's an audacious 'so bad it's good' element to the proceedings that makes it endlessly watchable". Patrick Galvan of Syfy Wire defended the film, calling it "a rather sweet little movie and one of Ishiro Honda's most earnest efforts in the Godzilla series. A poignant gem dealing with serious issues – many of them still relevant today – providing food for thought for adults while entertaining its target audience." Honda once called the movie "one of my favorites".
