= Club 6 =

- Genre: music
- Presented by: Mike Darrow; Bob Willson
- Country of origin: Canada
- Original language: English

Production
- Producers: Denny Spence; Paddy Sampson
- Production locations: Toronto, Ontario, Canada
- Running time: 30 minutes

Original release
- Network: CBC
- Release: October 1960 – 1962

Club 6 is a Canadian music television series which aired on CBC Television between October 1960 and 1962.

CHUM deejays Mike Darrow and Bob Willson played popular music for teens to dance to with featured performances by Tommy Ambrose, Pat Hervey, the Walter Boys and the Mickey Shannon Combo. The show was produced from a selected high school in Toronto.
