= J.C. Gipson =

American basketball player (1932–2009)

Personal information
- Born: April 30, 1932 Henderson, Texas, U.S.
- Died: December 30, 2009 (aged 77) San Bernardino, California, U.S.
- Listed height: 6 ft 8 in (2.03 m)
- Listed weight: 250 lb (113 kg)

Career information
- High school: Jefferson (Los Angeles, California)
- NBA draft: 1957: 11th round, 78th overall pick
- Drafted by: Philadelphia Warriors
- Position: Forward
- Stats at Basketball Reference

J.C. "Gips" Gipson (April 30, 1932 – December 30, 2009) was a professional basketball player.

== Early life and education ==
Gipson was born in Henderson, Texas, to Eddie Gipson and Alberta Nickerson. He grew up in Concord, Texas. In 1946 he moved with his mother to Los Angeles where attended the Mt Zion Baptist Church. He had two siblings, a brother named Emmett and a sister named Gale.

== Career ==
After graduating from Jefferson High School (Los Angeles) Gipson joined The Harlem Globetrotters where he played as a forward for almost 20 years. In the 1961-1962 ABL Season Gipson played for the Los Angeles Jets. He retired from the Globetrotters in 1979 and moved to Rialto, California and later Highland, California where he worked for several companies.

On August 3, 1995, he received a Globetrotters Legends ring for his 20 years of service.

== Personal life ==
Gipson married Betty Davis in 1971; she died in 2003. Together they had a daughter.

== Death ==
Gipson died on December 30, 2009, in San Bernardino, California. Just before his death he was working as a shop owner at an auto repair business.

== Legacy ==
Gipson was one of the Globetrotters to be portrayed in the Hanna-Barbera production The Harlem Globetrotters. He was voiced by Richard Elkins.
