= Mike Darow =

Canadian television personality (1933–1996)

Mike Darow (born Darow Myhowich; January 8, 1933 – December 7, 1996) was a Canadian-born television game show host. He is best known for hosting the 1968–1970 ABC run of Dream House in the United States, the 1985–1988 Canada-produced run of the Bob Stewart game show, Jackpot (seen in the U.S. on the USA Network), and Club 6 from 1960 to 1962.

He also hosted the first season of the game show The $128,000 Question, a syndicated revival of The $64,000 Question, in 1976. Darow's announcing work included the NBC game show The Who, What, or Where Game (1969–1974) and sub-announcing duties in 1980 for the Wink Martindale version of Tic Tac Dough. He also hosted the game show Bluff in 1976 and A Go Go '66 in 1966. He also hosted the Canadian game show Going Places from 1973 to 1980.

Darow also worked as an on-air disc jockey, first at CFRN in Edmonton in the late 1950s and in the early 1960s in Toronto at radio station CHUM. While there, he sang on two novelty recordings made as promotions for the station. Along with Bob McAdorey and other on-air personalities at CHUM, they recorded songs as The Chumingbirds (play on words). One song as "Mike Darow and the Chums" was The Battle of Queenston Heights in 1959. It reached No. 17 on the CHUM Charts in July 1959 as a Canadian version of Johnny Horton's The Battle of New Orleans. He later hosted Toronto-based segments of the MDA Labor Day Telethon on Global Television from 1977 until the early 1990s, as well as emceeing the annual ACT Telerama for CFRN-TV in Edmonton.

Darow died on December 7, 1996, aged 63.

Preceded by First Host	Host of Dream House; 1968 – 1970	Succeeded by Bob Eubanks (1983-1984)
Preceded by Geoff Edwards (1974-1975)	Host of Jackpot; 1985 – 1988	Succeeded by Geoff Edwards (1989-1990)
