= Valjean =

American pianist (1934–2003)

Valjean Johns (November 19, 1934 – February 10, 2003), who typically recorded under his first name only, was an American pianist best known for his recording of the theme song from the TV show Ben Casey.

Born in Shattuck, Oklahoma, Valjean studied music at the University of Oklahoma, graduating in 1958 and attaining a Fulbright scholarship. In 1962, he released a recording of David Raksin's "Theme from Ben Casey", which hit #28 on the Billboard Hot 100. It was his sole Top 40 hit on the pop chart. That same year, he released a full-length album, also titled Theme from Ben Casey, which peaked at #113 on the Billboard 200. He also scored the 1969 counterculture thriller The Big Cube, which starred Lana Turner.

Valjean also toured, making appearances with the Dallas Symphony Orchestra and the Tulsa Philharmonic Orchestra among others.
