= Bob Willson =

Canadian radio announcer and host (1928–2019)

- Born: 1928; Grande Prairie, Alberta, Canada
- Died: December 27, 2019 (aged 91)
- Occupation(s): Radio and television broadcaster

Bob Willson (1928 – December 27, 2019) was a Canadian radio announcer and the host of programs on CBC Television in Winnipeg and Toronto.

His broadcasting career started at the age of 18 at CFGP Grande Prairie, Alberta.

In 1947 he moved to CKUA Edmonton.

Willson started with CBC in 1949 at CBW Winnipeg, and was part of the on-air staff reporting on the Winnipeg Flood of 1950.

When CBWT started broadcasting in May 1954, he co-hosted the current affairs interview program Spotlight with Bruce Marsh.

In April, 1959, Willson moved to Toronto where he hosted a teen program on CBLT, Talk of the Town.

Willson was the Executive Producer for radio coverage of the 1988 Olympics for CBC.

Bob Willson died on December 27, 2019, at the age of 91.

== Sources ==
- "Winnipeg Favorite Is Popular In Toronto", Winnipeg Free Press - TV-Radio, November 26, 1960, p. 16
