= Harlem Globetrotters (TV series) =

Animated TV series

- Title card
- Genre: Sports; Comedy; Musical
- Starring: Eddie "Rochester" Anderson; Scatman Crothers; Robert DoQui; Richard Elkins; Stu Gilliam; Johnny Williams; Nancy Wible; Daws Butler; Don Messick
- Country of origin: United States
- No. of seasons: 2
- No. of episodes: 22

Production
- Producers: William Hanna; Joseph Barbera
- Running time: 30 minutes
- Production companies: Hanna-Barbera Productions; CBS Productions

Original release
- Network: CBS
- Release: September 12, 1970 – October 16, 1971

Related
- The Super Globetrotters

Harlem Globetrotters is a Saturday morning cartoon produced by Hanna-Barbera and CBS Productions, featuring animated versions of players from the basketball team of the same name.

Broadcast from September 12, 1970, to October 16, 1971, on CBS Saturday Morning, repeated from September 10, 1972, to May 20, 1973, on CBS Sunday Morning, and later re-run from February 4 to September 2, 1978, on NBC as The Go-Go Globetrotters—a two-hour show that also incorporated the animated shorts of a show of the previous year, The CB Bears. (The theme song of the new show hybridized alternate versions of the theme songs of both previous shows.)

The show team members featured fictionalized versions of historical Globetrotters Meadowlark Lemon, Freddie "Curly" Neal, Hubert "Geese" Ausbie, J.C. "Gip" Gipson, Bobby Joe Mason, and Paul "Pablo" Robertson, all in animated form, alongside their fictional bus driver and manager Granny and their dog mascot Dribbles.

The series worked to a formula where the team travels somewhere and typically get involved in a local conflict that leads to one of the Globetrotters proposing a basketball game to settle the issue. To ensure the Globetrotters' defeat, the villains rig the contest; however, before the second half of the contest, the team always finds a way to even the odds, become all but invincible, and win the game.

== Voice cast ==
The voice cast included:

- Scatman Crothers – George "Meadowlark" Lemon
- Stu Gilliam – Freddie "Curly" Neal
- Johnny Williams – Hubert "Geese" Ausbie
- Richard Elkins – J.C. Gipson
- Eddie "Rochester" Anderson – Bobby Joe Mason
- Robert DoQui – Pablo Robertson
- Nancy Wible – "Granny"

Guard Leon Hillard was originally planned to be on the series, but was cut out of the cast prior to the start of production.

== Production history ==
A total of 22 episodes of Harlem Globetrotters were eventually produced: 16 for the 1970–71 season, and six more for the 1971–72 season. Harlem Globetrotters has a place in history as being the first Saturday morning cartoon to feature a predominately African-American cast. Filmation's The Hardy Boys was the first to feature an African-American character the previous season (1969–70), and Josie and the Pussycats (1970–71), another Hanna-Barbera series which premiered 30 minutes earlier on the same day and network, was the first to feature an African-American female character. Like many other Saturday morning cartoons of the era, the first season utilized a laugh track. By season 2, the full laugh track was replaced by an inferior version created by the studio.

After their show's cancellation, the animated Globetrotters made three appearances on Hanna-Barbera's The New Scooby-Doo Movies in 1972 and 1973. Dribbles, who did not appear on the show, was in the theme song sequence; several references were also made to Granny, who also did not appear on the show. Hanna-Barbera produced a second animated series starring the Globetrotters in 1979 called The Super Globetrotters, this time featuring the players as superheroes. In spring 1999, TV Land aired repeats of Harlem Globetrotters on Saturday mornings as part of its TV Land Super Retrovision Saturdaze lineup. The series has not been rerun since.

The series was a co-production of Hanna-Barbera and CBS Productions (one of the few animated TV series that CBS directly produced). Syndication rights were originally held by Viacom Enterprises and later Paramount Domestic Television, formerly owned by CBS as its syndication arm. They are currently held by CBS Media Ventures, a Skydance company.

== Episodes ==
=== Season 1 (1970–1971) ===
Episode #	Episode title	Original airdate	Synopsis
HG-1	"The Great Geese Goof-Up"	September 12, 1970	When Geese gets hurt and goes to the hospital the other Globetrotters (due to Bobby Joe getting his hospital room number confused) think he was turned into a kangaroo at a magic show. The kangaroo was actually an unknowing accomplice in a jewelry theft. The Globetrotters must find the real Geese and stop the criminals if they can.
HG-2	"Football Zeros"	September 19, 1970	When a charity football game gets cancelled, the Globetrotters fill in for the missing team to raise money for underprivileged kids. The under-equipped and undersized Globetrotters initially get flattened by their opponents, the Mashers. However, after employing their basketball trickery, the Globetrotters get back in the game. After stumbling upon a robbery of the charity money at halftime, the team chases down the crooks on borrowed bikes. Posing as vacuum cleaner salesmen, the team gets the money back, and returns for the second half. In the end, the Globetrotters recover the money for the kids, catch the bad guys, and win the game.
HG-3	"Hold that Hillbilly"	September 26, 1970	A game against the Hillbilly Hill-Stars gets called off amidst an ongoing feud between the Flatfields and the Coys. The Globetrotters intervene and try to set up a marriage between the families to end the dispute. The team arranges the Annual Hillbilly Picnic, which leads to a game between the Globetrotters and the Flatfields to settle the marriage. After much cheating and chicanery by the Flatfields, Meadowlark decides to use the Flatfields' cheating ways against them to stage a massive comeback, winning 304-102. When Rock Flatfield refuses to marry Cora Coy despite the win, a chase ensues. Granny gives Cora a mudpack beauty treatment, Cora becomes beautiful, and the two families become kin.
HG-4	"Bad News Cruise"	October 3, 1970	The team's cruise to Hawaii is interrupted when a rival sea captain sabotages their ship, causing it to run aground. In exchange for having it towed free, the Trotters agree to play a basketball game—on surfboards.
HG-5	"Rodeo Duds"	October 10, 1970	The Trotters help a poor widow keep her ranch by entering a rodeo to win the prize money. The final event is a basketball game...against a team of kangaroos.
HG-6	"Double Dribble Double"	October 17, 1970	In Transylvania, the Globetrotters stop at a mad scientist's laboratory, unaware that he is building a basketball team consisting of robots. He switches Gip's mind with that of one of the mechanical men. After Gip is switched back, the team is pitted against the robots, but the scientist cheats with a switcheroo ball. Eventually, the Globetrotters defeat the robots, and the evil professor reforms.
HG-7	"Heir Loons"	October 24, 1970	Bobby-Joe inherits an estate from his rich uncle, but his cousin will stop at nothing to swindle BJ out of his inheritance.
HG-8	"From Scoop to Nuts"	October 31, 1970	The Globetrotters take over a failing newspaper to put it back in business; their success hinges on winning a basketball game—blindfolded.
HG-9	"What a Day for a Birthday"	November 7, 1970	Granny's birthday is coming up, but Bobby Joe loses the money to buy her a gift. To win it back, the Globetrotters enter a reluctant Curly into a wrestling match with a vicious strongman. With Meadowlark's help, Curly is victorious, but the prize money is stolen by two counterfeiting thieves, who also capture Dribbles. Dribbles manages to escapes back to the Globetrotters to lead them to the counterfeiters, and the Globetrotters claim the money back. However, the counterfeiters recruit their henchwoman to convince the Globetrotters to wager the prize money on a charity game. The game is against a female basketball team, whom the Globetrotters are too polite to actually try to score against, giving the "Girl Stars" a commanding lead in the first half. However, Granny convinces the Globetrotters that they can score with foregoing their courtesy, which allows the Globetrotters to come back in the second half, win the game, and expose the counterfeiters' scheme. And they manage to buy Granny's gift, and donate the remainder of the money to a real charity.
HG-10	"It's Snow Vacation"	November 14, 1970	While in Snow Valley for a vacation, the Globetrotters help out a kind lodge owner get more business against a tough rival.
HG-11	"The Great Ouch Doors"	November 21, 1970	The Globetrotters decide to take a group of bratty kids at a youth center on a camping trip. This leads to an encounter with a runaway circus lion, and the Globetrotters facing off against the circus performers. The Globetrotters win in the end, of course, and the kids mend their ways.
HG-12	"Hooray for Hollywood"	November 28, 1970	
HG-13	"Shook Up Sheriff"	December 5, 1970	The Globetrotters do their best to help their friend Wally Weaknees get elected sheriff.
HG-14	"Gone to the Dogs"	December 12, 1970	Dribbles harbors jealousy when Big Richard stops by to ask the Globetrotters to dogsit his pet poodle, Top Forty. The team takes Dribbles to a pet psychiatrist to make him behave like a normal dog. He provides them with a record of a dog barking to hypnotize Dribbles, but Big Richard is hypnotized into acting like a dog instead. Note: Big Richard is a caricature of Little Richard, who, by the time this episode aired, had left show business to become a minister. Top Forty is named after American Top 40, which Casey Kasem had begun hosting a few months before the series premiered.
HG-15	"The Wild Blue Yonder"	December 19, 1970	The Trotters win an airplane in a raffle and decide to start an air service. Their first customer is Prof. Right, who must get to the patent office before his invention is stolen by Prof. Wrong.
HG-16	"Long Gone Gip"	January 2, 1971	When Gip believes he's injured Pabs, he quits the team. The others track him to an Arabian sheikh, who pits them against his team trained by Gip. The Globetrotters must lose to save Gip's neck.

=== Season 2 (1971–1972) ===
HG-17. "A Pearl of a Game" (9/11/1971)
HG-18. "Nothing to Moon About" (9/18/1971)
HG-19. "Pardon My Magic" (9/25/1971)
HG-20. "Granny's Royal Ruckus" (10/2/1971)
HG-21. "Soccer to Me" (10/9/1971)
HG-22. "Jungle Jitters" (10/16/1971)

== In other media ==
=== Soundtrack LP ===
A soundtrack album, The Globetrotters, was produced by Jeff Barry and released in 1970 by Kirshner Records (Kirshner #KES-106, distributed by RCA Records), which featured tunes heard in episodes of the series (during the basketball game sequences). Don Kirshner served as music supervisor for both the series and the record. Two singles were generated from this onetime release, a cover of the Neil Sedaka tune "Rainy Day Bells" with former Cadillac J.R. Bailey on lead vocals, followed by three non-album singles. Jimmy Radcliffe produced, with Wally Gold, and provided the vocals on "Duke Of Earl", "Everybody's Got Hot Pants" from the first non-album single and co-wrote and produced "Everybody Needs Love" from the second as well providing a number of songs and recordings for the series.

Globetrotter frontman Meadowlark Lemon was the only member of the team to be actually involved with the project, adding occasional background vocals to some tracks.

==== Track list for The Globetrotters ====
(Side 1)

1. The Globetrotter's Theme (Jeff Barry) – 0:41
2. Globetrottin' (Barry) – 2:19
3. Bouncin' All Over the World (Neil Sedaka and Howard Greenfield) – 3:01
4. Sneaky Pete (Rudy Clark, J.R. Bailey, and K. Williams) – 2:45
5. Marathon Mary (Sedaka and Greenfield) – 3:06
6. River Queen (Sedaka and Greenfield) – 3:06
7. House Party (Clark, Bailey, and Williams) – 3:00

(Side 2)

1. Gravy (Clark, Bailey, and Williams) – 3:19
2. Meadowlark (Sedaka and Greenfield) – 2:22
3. Lillia Peabody (Clark, Bailey, and Williams) – 2:56
4. Put a Little Meat On Your Bones, Lucinda (Sedaka and Greenfield) – 3:00
5. Rainy Day Bells (Sedaka and Greenfield) – 3:02
6. Cheer Me Up (Jeff Barry, Ron Dante, and J. Carr) – 2:22

==== Commercial singles (1970) ====
- "Cheer Me Up" b/w "Gravy" (Kirshner # 63-5006)
- "Rainy Day Bells" b/w "Meadowlark" (Kirshner #63-5008)

==== Non-album singles (1971) ====
- "Duke of Earl" b/w "Everybody's Got Hot Pants" (Kirshner #63-5012)
- "Everybody Needs Love" (Jimmy Radcliffe and Phil Stern) b/w "ESP" (Kirshner #63-5016)
- "Sweet Georgia Brown" b/w "Bye Bye Blues" (Harlem Globetrotters #45-HGT-300 A/B)

=== Gold Key Comics series ===
In April 1972, Gold Key Comics launched a comic adaptation of the Harlem Globetrotters animated series; their first comic book appearance was in issue #8 of Gold Key's Hanna-Barbera Fun-In published in July 1971. Several stories in early issues were based on episodes of the TV show. The comic book series lasted for four years and 12 issues through January 1975.
