= 1970–71 United States network television schedule (late night) =

These are the late-night schedules for the three television networks during the 1970–71 season. All times are Eastern and Pacific.

PBS (which launched on October 5, 1970) is not included, as member television stations had local flexibility over most of their schedules, and broadcast times for network shows might have varied. ABC and CBS are not included on the weekend schedules because the networks did not offer late-night programs of any kind on the weekend.

Talk/Variety shows are highlighted in yellow, Local News & Programs are highlighted in white.

== Monday-Friday ==
-	11:00 PM	11:30 PM	12:00 AM	12:30 AM	1:00 AM	1:30 AM	2:00 AM	2:30 AM	3:00 AM	3:30 AM	4:00 AM	4:30 AM	5:00 AM	5:30 AM
ABC	Local programming	The Dick Cavett Show			Local programming or sign-off
CBS	Local programming	The Merv Griffin Show			Local programming or sign-off
NBC	Local programming	The Tonight Show Starring Johnny Carson			Local programming or sign-off

== Saturday/Sunday ==
-	11:00 PM	11:30 PM	12:00 AM	12:30 AM	1:00 AM	1:30 AM	2:00 AM	2:30 AM	3:00 AM	3:30 AM	4:00 AM	4:30 AM	5:00 AM	5:30 AM
NBC	Local programming	The Weekend Tonight Show			Local programming or sign-off

== By network ==
=== ABC ===
Returning Series

- The Dick Cavett Show

Not returning from 1969-70

- The Joey Bishop Show

=== CBS ===
Returning Series

- The Merv Griffin Show

=== NBC ===
Returning Series

- The Tonight Show Starring Johnny Carson
- The Weekend Tonight Show
