= 1971–72 United States network television schedule (late night) =

These are the late-night schedules for the three television networks during the 1971–72 season. All times are Eastern and Pacific.

PBS is not included, as member television stations had local flexibility over most of their schedules, and broadcast times for network shows might have varied. ABC and CBS are not included on the weekend schedules because those networks did not offer late-night programs of any kind on the weekend.

Talk/Variety shows are highlighted in yellow, Local News & Programs are highlighted in white.

== Monday-Friday ==
| - | | 11:00 PM | 11:30 PM | 12:00 AM | 12:30 AM | 1:00 AM | 1:30 AM | 2:00 AM | 2:30 AM | 3:00 AM | 3:30 AM | 4:00 AM | 4:30 AM | 5:00 AM | 5:30 AM |
|---|---|---|---|---|---|---|---|---|---|---|---|---|---|---|---|
| ABC | | Local programming | The Dick Cavett Show | | | Local programming or sign-off |
| CBS | Fall | local programming | The Merv Griffin Show | | | Local programming or sign-off |
| CBS | February | local programming | The CBS Late Movie (from 2/14) | | | | Local programming or sign-off |
| NBC | | local programming | The Tonight Show Starring Johnny Carson | | | local programming or sign-off |

== Saturday/Sunday ==
| - | 11:00 PM | 11:30 PM | 12:00 AM | 12:30 AM | 1:00 AM | 1:30 AM | 2:00 AM | 2:30 AM | 3:00 AM | 3:30 AM | 4:00 AM | 4:30 AM | 5:00 AM | 5:30 AM |
|---|---|---|---|---|---|---|---|---|---|---|---|---|---|---|
| NBC | local programming | The Weekend Tonight Show | | | local programming or sign-off |

== By network ==
=== ABC ===
Returning Series

- The Dick Cavett Show

=== CBS ===
Returning Series

- The Merv Griffin Show

New Series

- The CBS Late Movie

=== NBC ===
Returning Series

- The Tonight Show Starring Johnny Carson
- The Weekend Tonight Show
