= Letters to Laugh-In =

- Genre: Game show
- Directed by: Alan J. Levi
- Presented by: Gary Owens
- Country of origin: United States
- Original language: English

Production
- Running time: 30 minutes
- Production company: George Schlatter-Ed Friendly Productions in association with Romart Inc.

Original release
- Network: NBC
- Release: September 29 – December 26, 1969

Related
- Rowan & Martin's Laugh-In

Letters to Laugh-In is a daytime game show and spin-off of NBC's nighttime comedy series, Rowan & Martin's Laugh-In, that aired on the network from September 29 to December 26, 1969. The show was hosted by Gary Owens, the announcer for Laugh-In.

== Format ==
Home viewers mailed their jokes to the program, for which they were paid $2.00. Their jokes were read aloud by a panel of four celebrities – two of them Laugh-In regulars. Each joke was rated on a scale of minus-100 to plus-100 by a randomly selected audience panel.

"Morgul, the friendly Drelb" (who Owens always referred to on Laugh-In, but who was seen only two or three times) would hand Owens the categories for each round, in the form of a hand or puppet reaching through the top of the podium, usually with added sound effects.

For the program tapings, the show's band of three musicians, which included Laugh-In's musical coordinator, Russ Freeman, all wore the yellow rain jackets and hats which had been worn as costumes by various characters as joke links on Rowan & Martin's Laugh-In.

The highest- and lowest-rated jokes each day won the viewers a prize. Trips were awarded for the highest-rated Joke-of-the-Week (such as a trip to Hawaii), while the lowest-rated joke-of-the-week won a trip to "beautiful downtown Burbank". A grand prize (a 1969 convertible) was awarded for the highest-rated joke of the entire 13-week run (see below).

One particularly notable joke from the program asked the question, "What's the difference between a sigh, a car, and a jackass?" When the other person answered that he didn't know, the questioner said, "A sigh is 'oh dear,' and a car is 'too dear.'" When pressed "What's a jackass?", the questioner responded, "You, dear."

The eventual Grand Prize-winning entry was a joke read by actress Jill St. John: "What do you get when you cross an elephant with a jar of peanut butter? A 500-pound sandwich that sticks to the roof of your mouth!"

== Broadcast history ==
Letters to Laugh-In debuted on September 29, 1969 at 4:00 PM (3:00 Central). It replaced The Match Game, which had been canceled after a seven-year run in that slot. Like Match Game, Letters to Laugh-In faced the popular Dark Shadows on ABC and reruns of Gomer Pyle, U.S.M.C. on CBS. Despite being promoted regularly on the primetime Laugh-In, Letters to Laugh-In was soundly beaten in the ratings. Unlike the Monday-night Laugh-In (which enjoyed a five-year run on NBC), Letters to Laugh-In lasted only three months before being canceled on December 26. Its replacement was Lohman & Barkley's Name Droppers, an equally short-lived game that was replaced on March 30, 1970, by the soap opera Somerset.

== Episode status ==
One episode of Letters to Laugh-In was uploaded to YouTube in July 2012. The episode, taped on September 6, 1969, featured a celebrity panel of Jo Anne Worley, Dan Rowan, Angie Dickinson, and Jack E. Leonard.
