= Cattanooga Cats =

American animated television series

- Genre: Comedy
- Written by: Neal Barbera; Larz Bourne; Mike Maltese
- Directed by: William Hanna; Joseph Barbera
- Voices of: Jim Begg; Julie Bennett; Daws Butler; William Callaway; Dick Curtis; Marty Ingels; Casey Kasem; Paul Lynde; Allan Melvin; Don Messick; Janet Waldo; Bruce Watson
- Country of origin: United States
- No. of seasons: 2
- No. of episodes: 17

Production
- Producers: William Hanna; Joseph Barbera
- Running time: 60 minutes (1969–1970); 30 minutes (1970–1971)
- Production companies: Hanna-Barbera Productions; Thames International

Original release
- Network: ABC
- Release: September 6, 1969 – September 4, 1971

Cattanooga Cats is an American animated television series produced by Hanna-Barbera Productions that aired on ABC from September 6, 1969, to September 4, 1971.

The show was a package program similar to the Hanna-Barbera/NBC show The Banana Splits, except that it contained no live-action segments. During the 1969–1970 season, Cattanooga Cats ran for one hour and contained four segments: Cattanooga Cats, Around the World in 79 Days, It's the Wolf! and Motormouse and Autocat. During the 1970–1971 season, It's the Wolf! and Motormouse and Autocat were spun off into a half-hour show. Around the World in 79 Days remained as part of Cattanooga Cats, which was reduced to a half-hour. Motormouse and Autocat ran concurrently with Cattanooga Cats until both met their demise at the end of the 1970–1971 season.

== Plot and premise ==
=== Cattanooga Cats ===
Cattanooga Cats depicted the adventures of a fictitious rock band similar to The Archies and The Banana Splits made up of anthropomorphic cat hippies consisting of:

- Lead singer/guitarist Country (voiced by Bill Callaway)
- Singer/dancer Kitty Jo (voiced by Julie Bennett)
- Bassist Scoots (voiced by Jim Begg)
- Drummer Groove (voiced by Casey Kasem)

A fifth member, a mouse keyboardist named "Cheesie", was storyboarded but cut out of the series. The group traveled around in a van, was chased by a female cat groupie named Chessie, the "Autograph Hound" (also voiced by Julie Bennett) and Kitty Jo owned a big blue dog named "Teeny Tim". The singing vocals for The Cattanooga Cats were performed by Michael Lloyd and Peggy Clinger. Producer Mike Curb was the musical director for the series and co-wrote all the songs performed by the Cattanooga Cats. Ted Nichols composed the background music. An LP, Cattanooga Cats (Forward ST-F-1018), featuring some of the songs used in the series, was released in 1969.

The Cats also appeared in various "bumpers" between the other cartoons, but they were best remembered for their animated musical segments. These cartoons showed a strong psychedelic and op-art influence and the Cattanooga Cats remain a cult favorite to this day.

==== Episodes ====
Only nine cartoon story segments featuring the characters were produced.

No.	Title	Original release date
1	"Witch Whacky"	September 6, 1969
While traveling to a gig, the Cats meet a witch who is determined to use Kitty Jo as her replacement.
2	"Geronihoho"	September 13, 1969
A Native American chief chases tourists away to preserve his land, even in the modern day, until the Cats show him a better life in show business.
3	"The Big Boo-Boo"	September 20, 1969
A princess, her father, and her servant attend a concert of the Cats. The princess wishes she could do the dances, leading the servant to become obsessed with capturing Kitty Jo to fulfill the wish, in spite of the fact the people were to leave for home tomorrow. In the end, the Cats give her a book illustrating all the dances.
4	"The Wee Greenie Goofie"	September 27, 1969
A leprechaun has followed Kitty Jo's uncle home from the Republic of Ireland, and continues playing pranks on the Cats until they beat him at his own game. They turn down his pot of gold to let him free, and so he decides to hitch a ride with them.
5	"Mummy's Day"	October 4, 1969
The Cats manage to get inside a museum before closing time and get locked inside.
6	"Zoo's Who"	October 11, 1969
The Cats spend their day at a zoo.
7	"Autograph Hounded"	October 18, 1969
Chessie the Autograph Hound stalks the Cats to get autographs and satisfy her fan club, inspiring a nightmare experienced by Groove later. When he awakens, he thinks his dream has been real, but what he thought was Chessie was only a police officer asking the Cats to play at their charity ball.
8	"The Caribbean Kook"	October 25, 1969
A pirate invades a cruise ship where the Cats were booked to perform. After a series of plots the Cats foil, the passengers all think it was all part of the act. As a result, the pirate gets a full-time job in place of being a real pirate.
9	"Ghosting A-Go-Go"	November 1, 1969
The Cats arrive at a haunted house, where its ghost is determined to trap them once and for all.

=== Around the World in 79 Days ===
Loosely based upon the novel Around the World in Eighty Days by Jules Verne, this was an adventure segment involving balloonist Phineas "Finny" Fogg Jr. (voiced by Bruce Watson). He is conceived as the great-great-grandson from America of the main character Phileas Fogg in the novel. Reporter teenagers Jenny Trent (voiced by Janet Waldo) and Hoppy (voiced by Don Messick) and he set out on a globetrotting adventure to travel around the world in 79 days and beat the original record set by Finny's ancestor. The trio is in competition for both the record and a £1,000,000 inheritance against the sinister Crumden (voiced by Daws Butler), who was the butler of Phileas. Crumden is aided by his idiotic chauffeur Bumbler (voiced by Allan Melvin) and his pet monkey Smirky (voiced by Don Messick). Unlike the other segments, Around the World in 79 Days was a serial with a continuing story, but as with many shows made during this period, it has no specific ending.

==== Episodes ====
No.	Title	Original release date
1	"The Race is On"	September 6, 1969
Finny will inherit the family fortune on condition that he travel around the world in 79 days and break the previous Fogg record. He is given his great-great grandfather's hot air balloon, and while photographing the launch, reporters Jenny and Hoppy are carried away with Finny, forcing them to make the trip as well.
2	"Swiss Mis-Adventure"	September 13, 1969
When the sneaky Crumden's pet monkey Smirky uses a water hose to freeze their hot air balloon, the trio is forced to make an emergency landing in the Swiss Alps.
3	"Arabian Daze"	September 20, 1969
The trio journeys to the Sahara Desert, where Crumden lures Finny and his companions out of their hot air balloon and leaves them stranded in the desert.
4	"Madrid or Busted"	September 27, 1969
When the trio lands in Madrid, Spain, it becomes a wild chase as they are in hot pursuit of Crumden, who has stolen both Finny's map and his hot air balloon.
5	"Mr. Bom-Bom"	October 4, 1969
6	"India or Bust"	October 11, 1969
7	"Snow Slappy"	October 18, 1969
8	"Finney, Finney Fun, Fun"	October 25, 1969
9	"The Argentiney Meany"	November 1, 1969
10	"The Tree Man"	November 8, 1969
11	"Saucy Aussie"	November 15, 1969
12	"Crumden's Last Stand"	November 22, 1969
13	"Egyptian Jinx"	November 29, 1969
14	"Border Disorder"	December 6, 1969
15	"Troubles in Dutch"	December 13, 1969
16	"The Fiji Weegees"	December 20, 1969
17	"Hawaiian Hangup"	December 27, 1969

=== It's the Wolf! ===
It's the Wolf! followed the comic exploits of Mildew Wolf (voiced by Paul Lynde), who aspires to catch and eat a sure-footed lamb named Lambsy (voiced by Daws Butler). The wolf is always thwarted by a sheep dog (voiced by Allan Melvin) named Bristlehound. Bristlehound would apprehend Mildew (usually after hearing Lambsy cry out, "It's the wool-uff!"), pound him, and toss him sailing into the air, with Mildew screaming a phrase such as "Spoilsport!" as he flies into the horizon and lands with a thud.

==== Episodes ====
No.	Title	Original release date
1	"It's the Wolf"	September 6, 1969
In the pilot show, Mildew Wolf tries to catch Lambsy so he can eat him for dinner, but did not factor in the lamb's guardian, Bristlehound.
2	"When My Sheep Comes In"	September 13, 1969
Lambsy and Bristlehound are on a cruise ship headed for Australia so Lambsy can participate in a sheep show. Of course, Mildew shows up to make life miserable for the two.
3	"A Sheep in the Deep"	September 20, 1969
A deserted island is where Mildew finds Bristlehound and Lambsy relaxing. Eventually it sinks.
4	"High Hopes"	September 27, 1969
Lambsy is put in a hot air balloon and eventually joins Bristlehound in an airplane; all the while, Mildew is posing as the Crimson Baron (a parody of the Red Baron).
5	"Winter Blunder-Land!"	September 27, 1969
Winter has brought snow and Lambsy enjoys a variety of snow-themed activities, whilst having to have Bristlehound protect him from Mildew.
6	"Merry Go Roundup!"	October 4, 1969
Bristlehound builds an amusement park just for Lambsy.
7	"Super Scientific Sheep Sitting Service"	October 11, 1969
Bristlehound uses a closed-circuit-television camera system to help stop Mildew.
8	"Any Sport in a Storm"	October 18, 1969
Lambsy tries out a bunch of sports, all of which Mildew uses to try to catch him.
9	"Magic Wanderer"	October 25, 1969
Mildew and Lambsy, and later Bristlehound, use magic tricks in their ongoing battle.
10	"Runaway Home"	November 1, 1969
Lambsy decides to run away from home, but gives up after all of Mildew's follies, thus confirming Bristlehound was telling the truth when quoting: "Leave them alone and they'll come home, wagging their tails behind them."
11	"Smart Dummy"	November 8, 1969
Mildew makes mechanical dummies of himself to catch Lambsy, only to get beaten at his own game.
12	"Cat Caper"	November 15, 1969
13	"Mask Me No Questions"	November 22, 1969
The Masked Avenger is Lambsy's favorite TV hero, and he writes a letter to the character to ask for protection from Mildew. When Lambsy finally meets the actor who portrayed the Masked Avenger while running from Mildew, the actor's fear of wolves leads him to run away when he spots Mildew. Lambsy is disappointed and goes back to depending on Bristlehound after he drives off Mildew.
14	"Freeway Frenzy"	November 29, 1969
15	"Slumber Jacks"	December 6, 1969
16	"Pow Wow Wolf"	December 13, 1969
17	"Ghost of a Chance"	December 20, 1969
18	"Lamb Scout Cook Out"	September 12, 1970
Lambsy has joined the Lamb Scouts, a fact which Mildew uses to try to trap him.
19	"Wolf in a Sheep's Clothing"	September 19, 1970
Bristlehound and Lambsy search for Little Bo Peep's missing sheep, while Mildew tries disguises ranging from Little Bo Peep to Little Boy Blue, even playing a jazzy trumpet solo.
20	"To Beach His Own"	September 26, 1970
21	"Sheep Scene Stealer"	October 3, 1970
Mildew uses Lambsy's stage-acting lessons as an excuse to catch him.
22	"Kookie Cook Book Cook"	October 10, 1970
23	"Train Tripped"	October 17, 1970
Bristlehound and Lambsy take a train trip and Mildew comes along for the ride.
24	"I Never Met a Lamb I Didn't Like"	October 24, 1970
Mildew takes advantage of Lambsy's boredom to catch him, going as far as being a pony customers can ride for 10¢, but then an actual cowboy shows up and has actually paid the dime for the ride, so he rides Mildew.
25	"Channel Chasers"	November 7, 1970
When Lambsy and Bristlehound get a new television set, Mildew tricks Lambsy into thinking that he is a film director.

=== Motormouse and Autocat ===
Essentially a motor-racing version of Tom and Jerry, this segment involved the antics of a race car-driving cat named Autocat (voiced by Marty Ingels) and a motorcycle-driving mouse named Motormouse (voiced by Dick Curtis). Much of the segment's appeal lay in the bizarre cars that Autocat devised in his attempts to catch Motormouse, and in the unusual character voices and dialect. For example, Motormouse would often over enunciate words, saying things like "Chi-co-ry", and greeting Autocat with a friendly "Hey there, Au-to-cat". Motormouse resembled Pixie and Dixie in character design.

==== Episodes ====
No.	Title	Original release date
1	"Wheelin' and Dealin'"	September 6, 1969
Motormouse and Autocat compete with their racing machines when they receive new parts and upgrades.
2	"Party Crasher"	September 13, 1969
Autocat tries to crash Motormouse's party, not realising it is for his birthday.
3	"Water Sports"	September 20, 1969
4	"What's the Motor with You?"	September 27, 1969
5	"Mini Messenger"	October 4, 1969
Autocat attempts to put Motormouse's delivery service out of business.
6	"Wild Wheelin' Wheels"	October 11, 1969
Autocat's failed attempts to catch Motormouse without a car prompt him to take drastic automobile action.
7	"Soggy to Me"	October 18, 1969
Motormouse becomes a firefighter. Autocat's efforts to bag Motormouse end with him soaking wet.
8	"Crash Course"	October 25, 1969
Autocat tries to ensure Motormouse does not make it to the motorcycle race, but he gets himself in the race.
9	"Fueling Around"	November 1, 1969
When Motormouse mixes a new super fuel, Autocat tries to mix his own, with explosive results.
10	"Buzzin' Cousin"	November 8, 1969
11	"Snow-Go"	November 15, 1969
12	"Hard Day's Day"	November 22, 1969
Autocat creates a remote-controlled Motormouse Remover, complete with a missile.
13	"Tally Ha Ha"	November 29, 1969
14	"Hocus Focus"	December 6, 1969
15	"Kitty Kitty Bang Bang"	December 13, 1969
16	"King Size Kaddy"	December 20, 1969
17	"Catch as Cat Can"	September 12, 1970
18	"Catnapping Mouse"	September 19, 1970
19	"Paint That Ain't"	September 26, 1970
20	"I've Been Framed"	October 3, 1970
21	"Match Making Mouse"	October 10, 1970
22	"Electronic Brainstorm"	October 17, 1970
23	"Brute Farce"	October 24, 1970
24	"Bouncing Buddies"	October 31, 1970
25	"Ramblin' Wreck from Texas"	November 7, 1970
26	"Two Car Mirage"	November 14, 1970
27	"Alacazap"	November 21, 1970
28	"Genie and the Meanie"	November 28, 1970
29	"Choo Choo Cheetah"	December 5, 1970
30	"The Fastest Mouse in the West"	December 12, 1970
31	"Cat Skill School"	December 19, 1970
32	"The Cool Cat Contest"	December 26, 1970
33	"Lights! Action! Catastrophe!"	January 2, 1971
34	"Follow That Cat"	January 9, 1971

== Cast ==
- Jim Begg as Scoots
- Julie Bennett as Kitty Jo, Chessie
- Mel Blanc as Additional voices
- Daws Butler as Lambsy, Crumden, Tree Man (from Around the World in 79 Days segment "The Tree Man")
- Bill Callaway as Country
- Dick Curtis as Motormouse
- June Foray as Additional voices
- Paul Frees as Additional voices
- Marty Ingels as Autocat
- Casey Kasem as Groove
- Paul Lynde as Mildew Wolf
- Allan Melvin as Bristlehound, Bumbler
- Don Messick as Hoppy, Smirky, Opening Announcer
- Hal Smith as Additional voices
- John Stephenson as Additional voices
- Ginny Tyler as Additional voices
- Jean Vander Pyl as Additional voices
- Janet Waldo as Jenny
- Bruce Watson as Phineas "Finny" Fogg Jr.
- Paul Winchell as Additional voices

== Legacy ==
Hanna-Barbera had high hopes for Cattanooga Cats to be a hit program, like The Banana Splits, but the show failed to attract a large audience during its original run. Mildew Wolf, the most popular character on the program, resurfaced six years after the cancellation of Cattanooga Cats as co-host (with Snagglepuss) on Laff-A-Lympics, this time voiced by John Stephenson impersonating Paul Lynde. Lambsy appeared in the television film Yogi's Ark Lark. Sky One occasionally broadcast Cattanooga Cats shorts in the UK in 1990, the segments were shown in complete isolation, broadcast neither as part of the original show or a new compilation.

Reruns of the show were not seen until the program began airing as part of the Boomerang programming block on Cartoon Network, which later became a spin-off network of its own. For several months, Boomerang UK channel ran the musical interludes from the show, all of which ran to exactly 1 minute 45 seconds, as short (and unidentified) fillers before closing down at midnight. When the channel expanded to 24 hours, these interludes were dropped. The complete show has not been seen in the UK in recent years.

== Other appearances ==
Characters from the all 3 segments were featured in The Enchanted Voyage ride which operated from 1972-1983 at Kings Island in Cincinnati, Ohio.

The Cattanooga Cats, Teeny Tim, Lambsy, Mildew Wolf & Bristlehound appeared in the HBO Max original series Jellystone! with Country voiced by Scott Whyte, Kitty Jo voiced by Georgie Kidder, Lambsy voiced by Dana Snyder, and Mildew Wolf voiced by Bernardo de Paula. The Cattanooga Cats and Teeny Tim are portrayed as animatronics of the Cattanooga Cheese Explosion pizzeria where the Cattanooga Cats are an animatronic band and Teeny Tim is a robot waiter. Lambsy is implied to be Jewish in the season 2 episode "Yogi's Midlife Crisis" as Yogi's band appears to be performing at a Bar Mitzvah and Lambsy declares himself to be a man.

== Soundtrack ==
Cattanooga Cats

Soundtrack album
- Released: 1969
- Genres: Soundtrack, Bubblegum pop
- Labels: Forward Records, EMI
- Producers: Mike Curb, Michael Lloyd

A soundtrack album for the series was released in 1969, containing eleven of the show's songs with the lead vocals performed by Michael Lloyd and Peggy Clinger. The songs "Mother May I" and "Merry-Go-Round" were also released as singles to coincide with the series and album, with "Johnny Johnny Jump-Up" and "Country Carnival" as their respective b-sides. The songwriters were uncredited on the album but were credited on the accompanying singles. Curb Records, the eventual successor to Forward Records and EMI (owned by noted record producer Mike Curb), most likely owns the master tapes of the Cattanooga Cats album. Curb likewise has not expressed plans to re-release the Cattanooga Cats album.

=== Track listing ===
Side 1

No.	Title	Writer(s)	Length
1.	"Mother May I"	Michael Lloyd; Peggy Clinger; Debra Clinger	2:20
2.	"How Did I Ever Get So Lucky"	Lloyd	2:00
3.	"Wait A Minute For Country"	Mike Curb; Guy Hemric	1:55
4.	"My Group Has Too Many Cavities"	Harley Hatcher	2:00
5.	"Alle Alle Oxen Free"	Jerry Styner; Hemric	2:20

Side 2

No.	Title	Writer(s)	Length
1.	"Cattanooga Cats Theme"	William Hanna; Joseph Barbera; Curb	1:15
2.	"Country Carnival"	Valjean Johns; Hemric	1:50
3.	"Johnny Johnny Jump-Up"	Curb; Hemric	2:00
4.	"My Girlfriend Is A Witch"	Lloyd	1:55
5.	"My Birthday Suit"	Hatcher	1:40
6.	"Merry Go Round"	Johns; Hemric	2:30

=== Other songs ===
In addition to the album, other songs were featured in the series that were not released in any format.

- "Cash Register Romance" (Michael Lloyd)
- "Children Understand" (Valjean Johns, Guy Hemric)
- "Cold Wisconsin Night" (Lloyd)
- "Come and Play with the Cattanooga Cats" (Mike Curb, Hemric)
- "Come Back, Baby, Come Back" (Lloyd, Hemric)
- "Daydream" (Lloyd)
- "The Day When Love Won't Stay Away" (Lloyd, Shaun Harris)
- "Do You Dig the Music" (Johnny Cymbal)
- "Honey" (Lloyd, Hemric)
- "Hoot Owl" (Harley Hatcher)
- "I Want to Sleep Tonight" (Hatcher)
- "I Wish I Was a Fire" (Lloyd)
- "It's Summertime" (Cymbal)
- "Love Could Be" (Lloyd, Peggy Clinger)
- "Magic Machine" (Lloyd)
- "Pretty as a Picture" (Lloyd, Curb)
- "She Sure Got Soul" (Jerry Styner, Roger Christian)
- "She's the Right One" (Curb, Christian)
- "Sing a Song of Sixpence" (Lloyd, Styner, Hemric)
- "Stop Right There" (Lloyd)
- "The Story of My Life" (Lloyd)
- "Super Love" (Styner, Christian)
- "Up, Down, And on the Ground" (Lloyd, Clinger)
- "We're Incompatible" (Lloyd, Christian)
