= Memory Game =

1971 American television game show

- Also known as: Joe Garagiola's Memory Game
- Created by: Merv Griffin
- Presented by: Joe Garagiola
- Announcer: Johnny Olson
- Country of origin: United States
- No. of episodes: 120

Production
- Running time: 30 Minutes
- Production company: Merv Griffin Productions

Original release
- Network: NBC
- Release: February 15 – July 30, 1971

Memory Game (sometimes referred to as Joe Garagiola's Memory Game) is an American television game show hosted by Joe Garagiola that aired on NBC from February 15 to July 30, 1971. The show's creator and packager was Merv Griffin, and its announcer was Johnny Olson (his only announcing job for Merv Griffin Productions).

== Gameplay ==
Five contestants, all women and one of them a returning champion (or designate), compete and are spotted $50 at the start of the game. Before each round, they are each given a booklet containing the questions and answers to be used in that round. The time they have to study the material vary per round. Once the study time period elapses, the show's assistants collect the booklets and Garagiola begins asking questions at random from the booklet.

The champion – who is seated in the number 1 position – can elect to answer or call out an opponent's number (2 through 5). That player can answer or call any of her opponents to answer, and so on until a "time's up" buzzer sounds. At that time, the active player at that moment has to answer. A correct answer is worth $5, a wrong answer loses that amount. Play continues in this fashion until all the questions are exhausted.

Subsequent rounds are played with increased stakes ($10 in Round 2, $20 in Round 3 and all future rounds). The winner at the end of the show wins a $1,000 bonus and returns the next day to meet new challengers. If a contestant stays on for three days, she retires undefeated and wins a new car.

== Broadcast history ==
Memory Game was one of eight shows NBC attempted to program in the 1:30 PM (12:30 Central) time slot between 1968 and 1975; like most of the others, CBS' As the World Turns and ABC's Let's Make a Deal (formerly seen on NBC) soundly defeated it in the ratings.

Three weeks after this show's cancellation, NBC moved Garagiola to another daytime game, Sale of the Century, which he hosted for the rest of its original run. Three on a Match, hosted by Bill Cullen, replaced Memory Game on the NBC schedule.

== Production ==
According to The Encyclopedia of Daytime Television by Wesley Hyatt, Griffin did not identify his production company on the end credits of the program. The talk-show host and entertainment mogul never gave any explanation for his decision.

== Episode status ==
Much like other NBC games of the era, most episodes of Memory Game are believed to have been wiped as per network practices. Five episodes are known to exist at the UCLA Film and Television Archive. Audio of the premiere episode from February 15, 1971, was posted to You Tube in December 2022.
