= Fantastic Voyage (TV series) =

1968 American science fiction television series

- Title card
- Genre: Science fiction
- Directed by: Hal Sutherland
- Voices of: Marvin Miller; Jane Webb; Ted Knight
- Theme music composer: Robert Allen; Spencer Raymond
- Composer: Gordon Zahler
- Country of origin: United States
- Original language: English
- No. of seasons: 1
- No. of episodes: 17

Production
- Producers: Lou Scheimer; Norm Prescott
- Running time: 30 minutes
- Production companies: Filmation Associates; 20th Century-Fox Television

Original release
- Network: ABC
- Release: September 14, 1968 – January 4, 1969

Related
- Fantastic Voyage; Fantastic Voyage by Isaac Asimov, a novelization of the movie

Fantastic Voyage is an American animated science fiction television series based on the famous 1966 film directed by Richard Fleischer. The series consists of 17 half-hour episodes, airing Saturday mornings on ABC-TV from September 14, 1968, through January 4, 1969, then rebroadcast the following fall season. The series was produced by Filmation Associates in association with 20th Century Fox Television. A Fantastic Voyage comic book, based on the series, was published by Gold Key and lasted two issues.

The show was later broadcast in reruns on the Sci Fi Channel's Cartoon Quest, from 1992 to 1996.

There are currently no plans to release the series on DVD and/or Blu-ray Disc in Region 1 from 20th Century Home Entertainment, although most of the series is available for viewing on YouTube, and the show was released on DVD in the United Kingdom years previously.

== Premise ==
Fantastic Voyage is the story of the C.M.D.F. (Combined Miniature Defense Force), a secret United States government organization that possessed the ability to reduce people to microscopic size.

The main characters were Commander Jonathan Kidd; biologist Erica Lane; scientist Busby Birdwell; and a "master of mysterious powers" known only as Guru. The team was reduced in size for its missions, each miniaturization period having a time limit of 12 hours, and it traveled around in a microscopic flying submarine, the Voyager, doing battle against the unseen, unsuspecting enemies of the free world, both criminal and germinal matter. The missions of the team were given out and supervised by Professor Carter, in charge of the miniaturization process, and a character usually referred to as "the Chief" (presumably the overall leader of the CMDF), who was always seen only in shadow. Occasionally, the four were accompanied by people who did not work for CMDF, but who Professor Carter and The Chief felt would be helpful. More often than not, these people were villains. The series featured character voices provided by Marvin Miller, Jane Webb, and Ted Knight. The producers were Lou Scheimer and Norm Prescott; the director was Hal Sutherland. The music was provided by Gordon Zahler (of Plan 9 from Outer Space infamy).

Changes from the film, aside from the ship's crew, included the duration of miniaturization (one hour in the film, 12 in the cartoon) and the meaning of the acronym CMDF from "Combined Miniaturized Deterrent Force" to "Combined Miniature Defense Force".

== Opening narration ==
Headquarters: CMDF--Combined Miniature Defense Force. Project: Fantastic Voyage. Process: Miniaturization. Authority: Top Secret, highest clearance. Team: Jonathan Kidd, Commander. Guru, master of mysterious powers. Erica Lane, doctor, biologist. Busby Birdwell, scientist, inventor, builder of the Voyager. Mission: In their miniaturized form, to combat the unseen, unsuspected enemies of freedom. Time limit: Twelve hours.

== Voyager model ==
While the series was in production, the Aurora Model Company developed a plastic model of the Voyager, releasing it only months before the series' cancellation was announced. Due to the short run of the show, this kit received only one press run, and as a result, it is one of the rarest kits to find in the Aurora line. A contributing factor to this scarcity is that most of the kits were bought for use as toys (by fans of the show) rather than as static display or collectors's items; thus they were lost, broken or disposed of long before they became "collectables."

Unbuilt, in-box kits have been sold on eBay for prices between US$300 and US$700. Assembled and partially assembled models in varied conditions from "acceptable" to "well-worn" have been sold for over $100, depending on their condition.

Polar Lights, a company which owned the rights to re-produce the kit, passed on re-releasing the subject. Company director Dave Metzner stated that they had to produce much more in-demand subjects in order to be able to afford even considering the production of such niche products.

However, Moebius Models retooled from an original kit, and went into production on a reproduction Voyager kit, including the original distinctive delta-shaped stand used for Aurora aircraft models.

== Episodes ==
| No. | Title | Written by | Original release date |
|---|---|---|---|
| 1 | "The Gathering of the Team" | Ken Sobol | September 14, 1968 |
A computer search, conducted by Professor Carter, Busby Birdwell and the mysterious chief of CMDF selects a team -- Jonathan Kidd (leader), Erica Lane (physician-biologist), and Guru (mystic). Birdwell (albeit reluctantly) agrees to take the position of engineer-pilot. The team, along with Birdwell's all-purpose air-sea craft Voyager, is miniaturized "to the size of a pinpoint" for a test mission in a single drop of ocean water which contains microscopic life forms. An accident during an hourly progress check incapacitates the Voyager, the ship and its crew now threatened by one of the tiny life forms. The team must repair their craft, ascend back to the surface and be returned to the launching point before the miniaturization process wears off.
| 2 | "The Menace from Space" | Ken Sobol | September 21, 1968 |
The team tries to determine why a rocket crew suddenly lost most of its oxygen and nearly died. The team miniaturizes, along with a scientist — who turns out to be an enemy agent.
| 3 | "The Magic Crystal of Kabala" | Ken Sobol | September 28, 1968 |
When a wizard uses the Crystal Ball of Kabala for evil, the CMDF must go inside the crystal to destroy the evil within.
| 4 | "The Atomic Invaders" | David Melmuth | October 5, 1968 |
Investigating some mysterious butterflies that are causing explosions at power plants, the CMDF finds that a miniature alien race is responsible.
| 5 | "The Master Spy" | H.F. Mauberly | October 12, 1968 |
Master spy Gottfried Seneca infiltrates the CMDF, miniaturizes Professor Carter, then masquerades as him to sabotage the team's test missions.
| 6 | "The Mind of the Master" | Eric Blair | October 19, 1968 |
Somewhere in the Himalayas, Guru is seriously injured by an enemy. He is brought back to the CMDF, where Erica discovers that his brain is damaged. She reveals that the only way to perform the operation is to go inside him. Professor Carter brings in another mystic, the only one who can understand Guru's complex mind and mysterious powers. Unknown to the team, this mystic is the same man who attacked Guru and left him to die. NOTE: The plot of this episode is very similar to that of the original film.
| 7 | "Gone Today, Here Tomorrow" | David Melmuth | October 26, 1968 |
The team must stop miniature toys from escaping and causing havoc. Some of these toys are rubber Indians who go on the warpath.
| 8 | "The Day the Food Disappeared" | H.F. Mauberly | November 2, 1968 |
Mysterious, rapidly growing weeds are destroying the nation's crops. The CMDF team uncovers an enemy organization named the BOAF is behind it.
| 9 | "Revenge of the Spy" | Eric Blair | November 9, 1968 |
Busby is trapped in an enemy base, but manages to send the Voyager back to HQ. The rest of the team are joined in their rescue attempt by weapons expert Brigadier Taylor Desmond Shaw and vault engineer Mademoiselle Lisette Clossard.
| 10 | "The Hobby House" | David Melmuth | November 16, 1968 |
A new test pattern interferes with the CMDF radio beam, causing the Voyager and its top secret cargo to crash land between the toys of Jacob's Hobby House.
| 11 | "The Spy Satellite" | H.F. Mauberly | November 23, 1968 |
An enemy satellite is able to take top secret pictures, even through solid walls. The Voyager is dispatched to sabotage the satellite from the inside.
| 12 | "First Men on the Moon" | Eric Blair | November 30, 1968 |
Commissioner Upjohn arrives, and assigns the CMDF to look after his bratty son Alvin. The boy proves to be more than a burden, calling Busby "Birdbrain," and expressing his desire to be a space scientist when he grows up. He eventually commandeers the Voyager, flying the team to an artificial moon that is being used as a laser testing site. The adults have to rescue him when he ends up directly in the path of the laser.
| 13 | "The Great Busby" | Ken Sobol | December 7, 1968 |
Erica miniaturizes Busby without authorization to use him as a puppet at a children's hospital show, only to have a jealous puppeteer steal her "puppet."
| 14 | "The Barnacle Bombs" | Eric Blair | December 14, 1968 |
A bathysphere filled with Navy men is brought down into a hole in the ground underwater because of an evil professor; the Voyager team goes down to find it.
| 15 | "The Perfect Crime" | Eric Blair | December 21, 1968 |
Kidd betrays the team by stealing Busby's new portable miniaturization machine and joins criminal mastermind Eric Mensa on the wrong side of the law.
| 16 | "The World's Fair Affair" | David Melmuth | December 28, 1968 |
Enemy agitators threaten to blow up the World's Fair. The CMDF team have to find them and stop them among the attendees of the fair before it is too late.
| 17 | "The Most Dangerous Game" | Ken Sobol | January 4, 1969 |
Radioactive ore has been discovered in an old coal mine, so the crew flies into the mine before the whole state gets contaminated.

== Home media ==
The complete series was released, as a 3-disc DVD set, in the United Kingdom by Revelation Films on November 21, 2011.
