= Dream House (game show) =

American game show

- Created by: Don Reid
- Directed by: Alan Mifelow; Dick Schneider; Jeff Goldstein
- Presented by: Mike Darow; Bob Eubanks
- Announcer: Chet Gould; Johnny Gilbert
- Composers: Don Reid; Edd Kalehoff
- Country of origin: United States
- No. of episodes: 395 (NBC; 1983–1984)

Production
- Executive producers: Don Reid; Bob Ruben; Bob Synes
- Producers: Ron Greenberg; Ron Kweskin; George Vosburgh; Bob Synes; Lee Goldstein; Peter Noah
- Production locations: NBC Studios; Burbank, California
- Running time: approx. 26 minutes
- Production companies: Don Reid Productions; ABC Productions; Group W Productions; Lorimar Television

Original release
- Network: ABC Primetime
- Release: March 27 – September 19, 1968
- Network: ABC Daytime
- Release: April 1, 1968 – January 2, 1970
- Network: NBC
- Release: April 4, 1983 – June 29, 1984

Dream House is an American television game show. Contestants competed in a variety of quiz elements to earn the chance at winning a house. The show originally premiered in primetime on ABC on March 27, 1968, with a daytime edition premiering on April 1, 1968. The primetime series aired weekly until September 19, 1968, and the daytime series aired daily until January 2, 1970, when it was replaced with All My Children. The daytime series was revived for NBC's daytime schedule and premiered on April 4, 1983, running until June 29, 1984.

The original Dream House was hosted by Mike Darow with Chet Gould announcing. Bob Eubanks hosted the revival series, with Johnny Gilbert as announcer. The ABC version was recorded in New York City, while the NBC run was staged at the network's studios in Burbank, California.

== 1968–70 ==
The first format involved two couples competing in a game of quick recall. The first contestant to buzz-in answered and received five points for a correct response. If the contestant was wrong, however, the other couple could try to answer for ten points. When a contestant gave a correct answer, he or she was locked out of the next question.

Two minutes before the end of the game, which lasted from four to five minutes, the point values doubled, and at the end was the "Catch-Up Round" in which the team that was trailing could choose one last question from 10 to 50 points (if they answered correctly, the other couple got one last shot). The winning couple won a room of furniture.

Couples who won seven rooms of furniture on the daytime version (four on the 1968 primetime version) won their choice of either a new house (worth over $40,000, plus $7,000 to purchase land) or $20,000 in cash.

Beginning in 1969, three couples competed in the first round in which the first couple to buzz-in with a correct answer scored five points. A wrong answer, however, gave the other couples a chance to score ten points. Only during that first round would all contestants be allowed to buzz-in on all questions. The points were doubled during the last two minutes of the round. The two highest-scoring couples advanced to the next round, played exactly the same as the previous two-couple format. Five-time champions were offered an airplane in lieu of attempting to win two more games.

== 1983–84 ==
=== Main Game ===
Two teams of two (usually married couples), one of them a returning champion, competed to win a house worth approximately $100,000.

The host read a true/false toss-up question open to all four players. A correct answer awarded that couple $50 and their choice of four categories, while a miss gave the money and control to their opponents. Each category had a multiple-choice question with three possible answers. After the couple in control gave their answer, the opponents had the option to challenge and select a different one. The couple with the right answer won $100, or $150 in the event of an unsuccessful challenge. Each team could challenge twice during the round. Once a category had been played, it was removed from the board and a new toss-up was asked. The round continued until all four categories had been used.

The game was played in two rounds, with the leader after the first round winning a prize. The second round was played the same as round one, except that each team had a one-time option to double the value of any question for which they had earned control. The option had to be used after the question was asked, but before the answer choices were revealed. The couple leading after two rounds won the game, received a room of furniture, and advanced to the bonus round. Couples kept whatever they earned, win or lose. If the game ended in a tie, one more true/false toss-up question was played to break the tie.

During the show's 15-month NBC run, special weeks were set aside for siblings, single couples with children and engaged couples. There was also a week in November 1983 where the cast of Diff'rent Strokes played for a designated couple, as well as one from May 1984 in which two different celebrity teams played for charity each day.

==== Rule changes ====
Several rule changes went into effect in April 1984. The couple in control was required to hit their plunger to determine the question value displayed on a "money machine", a random light which stopped at $50, $100, or $150, and the question had only two answer choices rather than three. The value could also be accompanied with "Prize," which awarded a bonus prize to the team that answered correctly, or "Turnover," which gave control of the question to the opposing team. In the second round, a "Number Off" space was added to the machine, which allowed the team who answered correctly to remove one extra number from the combination lock if they reached the bonus round. Any team that won the game by a margin of $1,000 or more received a car, while a margin of $500 to $950 awarded a prize (later changed to a $500 bonus). Unlike the first format, the winners of round one did not receive a prize, and there was no double option available in round two.

=== Bonus round ===
In the bonus round, the couple tried to open a set of "Golden Doors" by programming the correct three-digit combination into an electronic lock that secured them. The lock displayed three rows of four digits each, and the correct combination consisted of one digit from each row. The couple was given an opportunity to remove incorrect digits before making their guess.

Originally, each day that a couple reached the bonus round, one incorrect digit was automatically removed from the lock, following the sequence of top-middle-bottom. A later rule change removed one digit for each time the couple returned, thus depriving them of having one eliminated on their first day. Once the Money Machine format was introduced into the main game, the couple could have one extra digit removed if they had correctly answered a "Number Off" question.

After the initial removal of digits, the couple chose one of three categories and answered three questions in it, each with two possible answers. Each correct response eliminated one more digit – from the top row for the first question, the middle row for the second, the bottom row for the third.

After the questions, the couple entered their guess at the combination. Once a digit was chosen, it could not be changed. After making their guess, the couple pressed a button referred to as a "time release bar," which caused a series of four lights built into the frame of the Golden Doors to activate from the bottom up. If the combination was correct, all the lights came on, the Golden Doors opened, and the couple won the house. If not, the topmost section remained dark, a buzzer sounded, and the host revealed the correct combination.

Champions returned to face the Golden Doors each day until they either programmed the winning combination, won enough games to automatically win the house, or were defeated by another couple. Seven victories were initially required to win the house; this threshold was later lowered to five, then raised to six. When a couple was one victory away from winning the house, a plunger alternately called a "Golden Circuit Breaker" and a "Hotline Switch" was brought out at the beginning of the second round. If the couple won, the plunger was pushed and the Golden Doors automatically opened.

Any couple that won the house — either by guessing the combination or by winning the requisite number of games — retired undefeated, and two new couples competed on the next show.

== Broadcast history ==
=== ABC ===
Replacing reruns of the cult crime drama The Fugitive, Dream House began broadcasting on April 1, 1968, at 1:00 p.m. Eastern Time. Its competition depended on the local market, as both NBC and CBS went down during that half-hour to allow their affiliates to run local or syndicated programming.

ABC used the show as a promotional device; questions were frequently about the network's shows and stars, and Monty Hall appeared in December 1968 to promote the move of his Let's Make a Deal from NBC to ABC.

The show ended amid some controversy. In the summer of 1969, TV Guide reported that none of the houses given away on the series at that point had been completed. Furthermore, according to the report, some winning couples had to borrow considerably more than the $7,000 the show awarded for the purchase of land. Shortly after this article was published, Dream House began offering the option of $20,000 in lieu of the house, but the damage had already been done and the ratings began to decline. The network cancelled Dream House in late 1969 and its final episode aired on January 2, 1970. The show was replaced by the new soap opera All My Children, which went on to a 43-year run.

=== NBC ===
Dream House premiered in the 11:30 a.m. Eastern (10:30 a.m. Central) time slot on April 4, 1983, replacing the 13-week game show Hit Man (which had been canceled despite the network's ratings increasing in that slot). Airing opposite the second half of the highly rated CBS game show The Price Is Right on CBS and the ABC soap opera Loving (which premiered three months later), the series ran for a total of 1¼ years. The final episode aired on June 29, 1984; three days later, NBC began airing a television adaptation of the board game Scrabble, which would occupy the 11:30 a.m. timeslot for the first three years of its nearly six-year run.

=== Episode status ===
In 2013, the Museum of Television Production Music reported that the studio master tapes of the 1983–84 version, which had been in the possession of series creator Don Reid, were destroyed by a flood.
