= A World Apart (TV series) =

- Genre: Soap opera
- Created by: Katherine Phillips
- Starring: Augusta Dabney; William Prince; Susan Sarandon; Susan Sullivan; David Birney; Dorothy Lyman; Clifton Davis; Tom Ligon
- Composer: Wladimir Selinsky
- Country of origin: United States
- Original language: English
- No. of episodes: 325

Production
- Producer: Tom Donovan
- Camera setup: Multiple-camera setup
- Running time: 22–24 minutes
- Production company: ABC, Inc.

Original release
- Network: ABC
- Release: March 30, 1970 – June 25, 1971

A World Apart is an American daytime drama that ran from March 30, 1970, to June 25, 1971, on ABC.

== Overview ==
The initial stories were written by Katherine Phillips (adopted daughter of Irna Phillips, who created Guiding Light, As the World Turns and Another World). The story concerned a soap opera writer who adopted two children, a fictionalized version of Irna Phillips' life.

Soap opera writer Betty Kahlman (Elizabeth Lawrence, Augusta Dabney) raised her adopted children without a husband. Her sounding board and friend was fellow soap opera writer Meg Johns, played by actress Anna Minot. Betty married Russell Barry (William Prince) and the early focus was on generational conflicts between a newly married middle-aged couple and their confused children. People tried to understand each other, but were ultimately "a world apart", echoing the title. Eventually, the show-within-a-show element was scaled back, and writer Katherine Phillips was replaced by Richard Holland and Suzanne Holland. At that point, Betty and Russell settled into a tranquil marriage.

Other storylines centered on the Sims family, who were mired in less turmoil than the Kahlmans, but still had their problems, as Dr. Ed Sims (James Noble) and his extremely conservative wife Adrian (Kathleen Maguire) struggled with their rebellious daughter Becky (Erin Connor).

== Cast ==
Many of the show's performers went on to later notability as actors, including Susan Sarandon (Patrice Kahlman), Bill Sims (Nathan Young), Nicolas Surovy (Fred Turner), Susan Sullivan (Nancy Condon), Dorothy Lyman (Julie Stark), and David Birney (Oliver Harrell). James Noble (Dr. Ed Sims) would eventually play Governor Eugene Gatling on the television comedy Benson alongside Robert Guillaume. Clifton Davis, who played Matt Hampton, would later appear in both That's My Mama and Amen, where he played Reverend Reuben Gregory. Jane White and Davis played mother and son on both A World Apart and Amen.

== Broadcast history ==
The series ran Monday through Friday at 12:30 p.m. EST (11:30 a.m. Central), opposite CBS' then-popular Search for Tomorrow and NBC's The Who, What, or Where Game. It managed only a minuscule 2.8 rating, making it the second-worst-rated soap on the three networks—ahead of only The Best of Everything, which aired just before A World Apart, at noon EST. (The ironically-named Best sported an even-worse figure of 1.8, one of lowest ever for a US soap opera. Both series debuted on the same day, replacing re-runs of Bewitched and That Girl.) ABC canceled the show after a little over a year, wrapping up with a moving episode where Patrice Kahlman finally made peace with giving her newborn son up for adoption (among the few, if not only, episodes of this show known to survive).
