= Will the Real Jerry Lewis Please Sit Down =

- Created by: Lou Scheimer and Norm Prescott
- Developed by: Lee Rich
- Directed by: Hal Sutherland
- Voices of: Howard Morris; Jane Webb; David Lander
- Theme music composer: Richard Delvy; Ed Fournier
- Opening theme: "Please Sit Down"
- Ending theme: "Please Sit Down (reprise)"
- Composers: Jeff Michael; George Blais
- Country of origin: United States
- Original language: English
- No. of seasons: 1
- No. of episodes: 18

Production
- Producers: Norm Prescott; Lou Scheimer
- Production company: Filmation

Original release
- Network: ABC
- Release: September 12, 1970 – January 9, 1971

Will the Real Jerry Lewis Please Sit Down is a 1970 animated show produced by Filmation for the network, ABC. The title is a variant of the deciding question on the game show To Tell the Truth: "Will the real __________ please stand up?" Like most 1970s-era Saturday morning cartoon series, Will the Real Jerry Lewis Please Sit Down contained an adult laugh track.

Though Jerry Lewis contributed to some of the scripts, he did not voice any of the characters. The central character of Jerry Lewis was voiced by David Lander, who would later be known for his role of Squiggy on Laverne & Shirley.

== Premise ==
Similar to his depiction in DC Comics' long running comic book title, The Adventures of Jerry Lewis (originally published as The Adventures of Dean Martin and Jerry Lewis), Jerry Lewis in the cartoon was depicted as a gangly, rubbery slapstick caricature. Among the recurring characters were Chinese detective Hong Kong Flewis and his rotund son, One Ton Son; his father, Professor Lewis; and his sister Geraldine (and her pet frog, Spot). Presumably, the series takes place somewhere in the New York/New Jersey/Connecticut tri-state area, since in one episode, Jerry sees a road sign that reads "Atlantic City. 216 miles".

In the series, Jerry worked for the Odd Job Employment Agency under the supervision of the obnoxious Mr. Blunderpuss. A typical episode found Jerry being assigned a job, and making a complete shambles of it in his harmless, naive way.

The theme song and commercial bumpers were sung in a contemporary "bubblegum" style, with the song interrupted before the end of its final verse with the title of the show intoned in a scolding manner by Howard Morris as the announcer who stretched out the word "please" and shouted "sit down".

== Cast ==
- David Lander as Jerry Lewis
- Howard Morris as Mr. Blunderpuss, Ralph Rotten Lewis, Professor Lewis, One Ton Son, Hong Kong Flewis, Uncle Seadog, additional voices
- Jane Webb as Geraldine Lewis, Rhonda (Jerry's girlfriend)

== Episodes ==
No.	Title	Original release date
1	"Computer Suitor"	September 12, 1970
2	"Crash Course"	September 19, 1970
Mr. Blunderpuss and Rhonda follows Jerry around at Barbour College to check and see if he does any assignment right and where Jerry's dad is given a lecture.
3	"2 ½ Ring Circus"	September 26, 1970
4	"Good Luck Charm"	October 3, 1970
5	"Out to Launch"	October 10, 1970
Jerry gets a job cleaning up at the Space Research Center. He accidentally knocks out one of the astronauts and takes his place by going on a space mission.
6	"Watch of the Rhino"	October 17, 1970
Jerry is given an assignment to protect a white rhino at the zoo and his uncle, Ralph Rotten Lewis plans to kidnap it.
7	"To Beep or Not To Beep"	October 24, 1970
Jerry gets a job at The Leadfoot Automobile factory as a horn tester.
8	"How Green Was My Valet"	October 31, 1970
9	"Movie Madness"	November 7, 1970
Jerry gets a job washing windows at a movie studio and ends up saving an actress's life and ends up getting a job in the movie by his uncle Ralph Rotten Lewis.
10	"Rainmaker"	November 14, 1970
Jerry is sent out to be a medicine man way out at "Yucca Flats" where he tries to make it rain for Chief Ugly Bird.
11	"Jerry Goes Ape"	November 21, 1970
Jerry encounters a man who's been turned into a gorilla. Only a Native American princess can break the spell, but it's easier said than done.
12	"Haunted House Guest"	November 28, 1970
13	"Penthouse"	December 5, 1970
14	"Shipboard Romance"	December 12, 1970
15	"Hokus Pokus"	December 19, 1970
16	"Double Trouble"	December 26, 1970
Professor Lewis's newest invention creates a macho clone of Jerry. Jerry pursues this clone and Rhonda, who are on their way to Atlantic City, where Rhonda has entered a beauty contest.
17	"Jerry"	January 2, 1971
18	"Double Oh-Oh"	January 9, 1971

== Production ==
Along with Groovie Goolies, this was one of the first Filmation series to feature the rotating Lou Scheimer/Norm Prescott "wheel" credit. Previous shows featured a standard credit with Scheimer's name above Prescott's. It was also Filmation's first show to feature director Hal Sutherland's name written in calligraphic lettering.

== Availability ==
As of 2026, the series has not received a home release.
