= Words and Music (American game show) =

- Created by: Jack Quigley
- Directed by: Lou Tedesco
- Presented by: Wink Martindale
- Announcer: Johnny Gilbert
- Composer: Jack Quigley
- Country of origin: United States
- No. of episodes: 94

Production
- Producer: Jack Quigley
- Production locations: NBC Studios; Burbank, California
- Running time: approx. 28 minutes
- Production companies: Jack Quigley-Winter Rosen Productions

Original release
- Network: NBC
- Release: September 28, 1970 – February 12, 1971

Words and Music is an American television game show. It was one of only two game shows to debut during 1970 (the other show was Can You Top This). The show was hosted by Wink Martindale, who also hosted the aforementioned Can You Top This. The game was played in four rounds. At the start of the show, three contestants faced a game board consisting of 16 squares. Behind each square was a clue associated with a word to be sung in a song by the show's four regular singers: Peggy Connelly, Katie Gran, Bob Mario, and Don Minter. For example, the clue is "right between the eyes" and the word in the song the players are listening for is "nose". The first player to buzz in with the correct word after it was sung won cash and the opportunity to select the next clue. Four songs were played in each round. The player with the highest cash score at the end of the day won the game and the right to compete on the next show. There was no bonus game. Contestants who won three days in a row received a brand new car.

== Broadcast history ==
Words and Music aired each weekday afternoon on NBC from 1:30 to 2:00 PM, where it was beaten in the ratings by ABC's Let's Make a Deal and the CBS soap opera As the World Turns. In his autobiography Winking at Life, Wink Martindale noted that part of the way through the run, game show veteran Howard Felsher, who was known in the industry as the Game Show Doctor because of his ability to repair game show format flaws, was brought aboard as the new producer. Felsher implemented several rule changes but was unsuccessful in saving the show.
