= Jambo (TV series) =

Wildlife television series

- Genre: Wildlife anthology Children
- Narrated by: Marshall Thompson
- Country of origin: United States
- Original language: English
- No. of seasons: 2

Production
- Executive producer: Ivan Tors
- Production location: Africa
- Running time: 30 mins.

Original release
- Network: NBC

Jambo is a wildlife anthology television series broadcast on NBC from 1969 to 1971.

Intended for children, the show was hosted and narrated by actor Marshall Thompson. Spots were filmed on location in Africa. The series was intended to be a companion of sorts to Thompson's series Daktari. Ivan Tors was creator and executive producer of both.

The title "Jambo" is a greeting in Swahili, a language used throughout East Africa.

== Sources ==
- Terrace, Vincent. Encyclopedia of Television Shows, 1925 through 2007. Jefferson, North Carolina: McFarland & Co., 2008.
