= Skyhawks (TV series) =

American animated television series

Skyhawks opening screen

Skyhawks was a 17-episode television animated series sponsored by Mattel Toys. Each half-hour episode consisted of two adventures. The series originally aired from September 6, 1969 to September 4, 1971 on ABC. It was a Pantomime Picture Production and is distributed by CBS Television Distribution.

== Plot ==
Skyhawks, Inc. was a family-run air transport and rescue service based at San Marcos Field in Southern California, and headed by widower Mike "Cap" Wilson. Cap Wilson learned how to fly during World War II, during which he achieved the rank of Colonel. Cap's father, famed aviator Pappy Wilson, had been a World War I flying ace. A warm and encouraging father, Cap had 17-year-old fraternal twins named Steve and Carolyn. He also sponsored two foster kids: 14-year-old Baron "Red" Hughes and his 9-year-old sister Cynthia, usually referred to as "Cindy", though she was also nicknamed "Mugs". The Wilson crew also included Cap's girlfriend. Maggie McNally. Joe Conway was the Skyhawks' chief mechanic. The team saved troubled charter planes, rescued helicopter pilots, transported air freight, even ran secret government missions. San Marcos Field was also the home base of the Skyhawks' unscrupulous competitor, Buck Devlin, and his gang of pilots.

== Production ==
A 17-episode television cartoon series sponsored by Mattel Toys, Skyhawks was produced by Ken Snyder at Pantomime Pictures. Each episode consisted of two adventures. The series aired on ABC from September 6, 1969 to September 4, 1971.

Topper Toys alleged that this show and its sister series Hot Wheels were merely 30-minute commercial ads for Mattel.

== Cast (voices) ==
The Wilson Crew

- Captain Mike Wilson—Michael Rye
- Steve Wilson—Casey Kasem
- Caroline Wilson—Iris Rainer
- Pappy Wilson—Dick Curtis
- Maggie McNalley—Joan Gerber
- Baron "Red" Hughes—Dick Curtis
- Cynthia Hughes—Melinda Casey
- Joe Conway—Casey Kasem
- Buck Devlin—Bob Arbogast

== Episodes ==
There were 17 episodes, comprised two adventures each. At the end of each episode a short extra gave information on piloting and flying.

- "Night Flight"/"Flight to Danger (Big Wet Bird)"
- "Untamed Wildcat"/"Silent Flight"
- "The Search"/"Mission to Avalanche Wells"
- "Lobster Pirates"/"The Message"
- "Hidden Valley"/"The Snooper"
- "Bams Away"/"Vacation with Danger"
- "The Radioactive Lake"/"Circus Trail"
- "The Sniffers"/"Hot Wire on Storm Mountain"
- "Fire in the Tree"/"Runaway Ride"
- "The Duster"/"Animal Airline"
- "Discover Flying"/"Pappy to the Rescue"
- "The Intruders"/"Trouble Times Three"
- "Operation Slingshot"/"Dog Fight"
- "Quick Frozen"/"All at Sea"
- "Ground Zero"/"Devlin's Dilemma"
- "Barnstormer's Circus"/"The Peril of the Prince"
- "Carrier Pigeon"/"Mercy Flight"
