= Bright Promise =

American soap opera

- Genre: Soap opera
- Created by: Frank and Doris Hursley
- Written by: Larry Brody; Rick Edelstein; Frank and Doris Hursley
- Directed by: Rick Edelstein; Richard Franchot; Gloria Monty
- Country of origin: United States
- Original language: English
- No. of episodes: 605

Production
- Executive producers: Frank and Doris Hursley
- Producers: Dick Dunn; Jerry Layton
- Running time: 30 minutes (Approx.)
- Production companies: Frandor Productions; Bing Crosby Productions

Original release
- Network: NBC
- Release: September 29, 1969 – March 31, 1972

Bright Promise is an American daytime soap opera that ran on NBC from September 29, 1969 to March 31, 1972.

== Synopsis ==
The show revolved around students and faculty at the fictional Bancroft College, located in the community of Bancroft, somewhere in the American Midwest. The name of the show reflected the overarching theme of the bright promise that the leaders of tomorrow graduating from Bancroft would ostensibly bring. At first, the main character was College president Thomas Boswell (Dana Andrews). Later, the focus shifted from the College, to the town of Bancroft at large, and focused mainly on the Pierce and Jones families. The main character by this time was Sandra Jones, who had been a student at Bancroft College, and married herself into the wealthy Pierce family.

Bright Promise was created by the husband-and-wife writing team of Frank and Doris Hursley, who had previously created General Hospital, and was their last project prior to their retirement. Bing Crosby Productions (under the name Frandor Productions) was the packager, with assistance from Cox Broadcasting. The title and closing sequences were filmed at UCLA.

Having replaced the game show You Don't Say!, Bright Promise would give way to another soap opera, Return to Peyton Place, on the NBC daytime schedule; the serial had been soundly defeated in the Nielsen ratings by CBS' The Edge of Night and ABC's One Life to Live. Actress Gail Kobe, a regular on Bright Promise, would become Return's executive producer.

== Cast ==
Original cast members included the show's star, Dana Andrews, with Susan Brown, Paul Lukather, Ruth McDevitt, Ivor Francis, Forrest Compton, Richard Eastham, Betsy Jones-Moreland, Coleen Gray, Gary Pillar, Peter Hobbs, Peter Ratray, Pat Woodell, Susannah Darrow, Cheryl Miller, and Eric James. Later additions included David Lewis, Annette O'Toole, Dabney Coleman, Marion Brash, Anne Seymour, Anthony Geary, Gail Kobe, John Considine, Philip Carey, Anne Jeffreys and Sherry Alberoni.
