= Here Comes the Grump =

- Genre: Comedy; Fantasy
- Voices of: Rip Taylor; Indira Stefanianna; Jay North
- Country of origin: United States
- Original language: English
- No. of seasons: 1
- No. of episodes: 17

Production
- Producers: David H. DePatie; Friz Freleng
- Production companies: DePatie–Freleng Enterprises; The Mirisch Company

Original release
- Network: NBC
- Release: September 6, 1969 – April 25, 1970

Here Comes the Grump is an American animated television series produced by DePatie–Freleng Enterprises and aired Saturday mornings on NBC from 1969 to 1970. It was later shown in reruns on Sci-Fi Channel's Cartoon Quest.

Structured as a battle between good and evil, the show was played for comedy. The Grump, the purportedly-threatening villain of the peace, was voiced by extravagant prop comic Rip Taylor.

== History ==
The main character was a small, grumpy wizard who put a spell of gloom on the kingdom of the Princess Dawn. The Princess and her friend Terry Dexter (a boy from the "real" world) searched for the Cave of the Whispering Orchids to find a magic crystal key to break the spell, while the Grump tried to stop them. In each episode the Grump flew a dragon named Dingo, chasing Terry and Princess Dawn. This led them to bizarre places with strange characters, such as the Blabbermouth of Echo Island, where the mountains were made of living Swiss cheese.

The Princess had a pet named Bip — a vaguely doglike creature with tentacular legs, that sniffed clues like a hound dog, turned around by pulling in its tail and head and popping them back out at opposite ends, and communicated in the sounds of a soprano bugle. In most episodes, the Princess and her friends traveled in a flying car supported by a big balloon.

A recurring gag was that at the last minute when the Grump was about to catch up with Princess Dawn, the Dragon would sneeze and burn the little wizard.

The character of the Grump was based upon Yosemite Sam, also created by Friz Freleng. The Grump's Dragon was similar to Sam's in Knighty Knight Bugs, including the fiery nasal explosions upon its master.

== Broadcast ==
The series was broadcast by NBC from September 6, 1969, to April 25, 1970. NBC continued to air reruns until January 23, 1972.

The series lasted one season and was rerun, the most recent airing was on the Sci-Fi Channel in the mid 1990s. The complete series was released on DVD on January 31, 2006.

The series was called Ahi viene Cascarrabias in Spanish and was retransmitted into the 1970s and well into the 1980s by Televisa, in Mexico, with another rerun in 2006 after the DVD set was launched. It was "Grump, o feiticeiro trapalhão" in Brazilian Portuguese and was rerun in Brazil until 1993 by Rede Globo.

The only known merchandise for the show was a "Here Comes the Grump" Halloween mask, produced by the Ben Cooper Costume Company, for the 1969 holiday season.

== Episode guide ==
There were 17 episodes, each containing two ten-minute shorts, giving a total of 34 separate cartoons.

1. The Bloonywoonie Battle (First aired: 9/6/1969)
2. The Great Grump Crunch (First aired: 9/13/1969)
3. The Great Thorn Forest (First aired: 9/20/1969)
4. The Eenie Meenie Miners (First aired: 9/27/1969)
5. The Good Ghost Ship (First aired: 10/4/1969)
6. Grump Meets Peter Paintbrush (First aired: 10/11/1969)
7. The Lemonade Sea (First aired: 10/18/1969)
8. Beware of Giants (First aired: 10/25/1969)
9. Joltin' Jack-In Boxia (First aired: 11/1/1969)
10. Visit to a Ghost Town (First aired: 11/8/1969)
11. A Mess for King Midix (First aired: 11/15/1969)
12. The Shoes of Shoe-Cago (First aired: 11/22/1969)
13. Witch Is Witch? (First aired: 11/29/1969)
14. The Yuks of Gagville (First aired: 12/6/1969)
15. Toilin' Toolie Birds (First aired: 12/13/1969)
16. The Grand Slam of Door City (First aired: 12/20/1969)
17. Under the Pea Green Sea (First aired: 12/27/1969)
18. Sugar and Spite (First aired: 1/3/1970)
19. The Great Shampoo of Snow White City (First aired: 1/10/1970)
20. The Grump Meets the Grouch Grooch (First aired: 1/17/1970)
21. The Wily Wheelies (First aired: 1/24/1970)
22. The Blabbermouth of Echo Island (First aired: 1/31/1970)
23. With Malice in Blunderland (First aired: 2/7/1970)
24. Apachoo Choo-Choo (First aired: 2/14/1970)
25. A Hitch in Time (First aired: 2/21/1970)
26. The Shaky Shutter-Bugs (First aired: 2/28/1970)
27. S'No Land Like Snow Land (First aired: 3/7/1970)
28. Good Grief, Mother Goose (First aired: 3/14/1970)
29. The Balled-Up Bloonywoonies (First aired: 3/21/1970)
30. Cherub Land (First aired: 3/28/1970)
31. Meet the Blockheads (First aired: 4/4/1970)
32. Hoppy-Go-Lucky Hippetty Hoppies (First aired: 4/11/1970)
33. The Blunderful Flying Machine (First aired: 4/18/1970)
34. The Absent-Minded Wizard (First aired: 4/25/1970)

== Voices ==
- Rip Taylor - The Grump
- Jay North - Terry Dexter
- Avery Schreiber
- Stefanianna Christopherson - Princess Dawn
- Marvin Miller
- Paul Frees
- Bob McFadden
- Athena Lorde
- Larry D. Mann
- June Foray

== Staff ==
- Direction: Gerry Chiniquy, Art Davis, George Gordon, Sid Marcus, Hawley Pratt, Grant Simmons
- Story Supervision: John W. Dunn
- Stories: Don Christensen, Nick George, Bill Lutz
- Layout: Pete Alvarado, Bob Givens, Herb Johnson, Jack Miller, Dick Ung, Don Sheppard, Martin Studler, Al Wilson
- Character Design: Art Leonardi
- Animation: Warren Batchelder, Robert Bentley, William Carney, Edward DeMattia, Xenia, John Gibbs, Manny Gould, Ed Love, Ed Rehberg, Manny Perez, Bob Richardson, Ed Solomon, Robert Taylor, Lloyd Vaughan, Don Williams
- Backgrounds: Richard Thomas, Mary O'Loughlin, Tom O'Loughlin
- Film Editing Supervised by Lee Gunther
- Film Editing: Allan Potter, Todd McKay, Lloyd Friedgen
- Music: Doug Goodwin
- Production Supervision: Jim Foss
- Prod. Coordinator: Harry Love
- Sound by Producers' Sound Service, Inc.
- Produced by David H. DePatie, Friz Freleng

== Film ==
A feature film adaptation based on the series was produced by Ánima Estudios in Mexico and the newly launched GFM Animation, with the animation being done at Prime Focus World in London.

The film was released in Mexico on July 26, 2018, followed by the US release on September 14, under the name A Wizard's Tale.
