= The Who, What, or Where Game =

- Created by: Ron Greenberg
- Directed by: Dick Schneider
- Presented by: Art James
- Announcer: Mike Darow
- Composer: George David Weiss
- Country of origin: United States
- No. of episodes: 1,030

Production
- Executive producer: Ron Greenberg
- Producer: John Rhinehart
- Production locations: NBC Studios; New York, New York
- Running time: 25 Minutes
- Production companies: Ron Greenberg Productions; NBC Productions

Original release
- Network: NBC
- Release: December 29, 1969 – January 4, 1974

The Who, What, or Where Game is an American television game show that was broadcast weekdays on NBC from December 29, 1969, to January 4, 1974. The host was Art James, and the announcer was Mike Darow; Ron Greenberg packaged the show, which was recorded in NBC studios 6A and 8H in Rockefeller Plaza in New York City.

== Rules ==
Three contestants, one usually a returning champion, competed.

Each player was spotted $150 (later episodes it was $125) at the start of the game and used that money to wager on their knowledge of the questions presented. Each category (which dealt in various subjects; one category per game usually "Pot Luck," with random questions) had three question choices: a who question (dealing with people), a what question (dealing with things), and a where question (dealing with places). Each question had odds attached to it depending on the difficulty of the question. Easy questions paid off at even (1:1) odds, noted by an E under the question, but more difficult questions offered higher odds, usually 2:1 or 3:1. Each question was read only once.

Originally players could wager up to $25 for first round questions and $50 for second round questions, but this was later changed to $50 for the entire game. Answering correctly won the amount of the wager multiplied by the odds while only the amount of the wager was taken away for a wrong answer. If a player's score dropped to zero during any point in the game, that player was eliminated from further play.

The contestant who made the highest wager for any given question was given the right to answer it. If two or more contestants picked the same category and wagered the same amount, James put the question up for auction with the tied contestants now being able to wager up to their entire score if they desired. Bidding continued until one player elected to let the opposing player answer. In the rare case that the auction failed to break the deadlock, both contestants would write their answers down.

Later in the show's run, a "lightning round" category was played (known as the "3 W's Quick Round"), in which players buzzed in on rapid-fire questions for 60 seconds. This was the only time when any buzz-in technique was used in the game.

After all rounds had been played, the three players played the "Pot Limit" round with one final category. Once again, the category and question odds would be displayed for the contestants. However, players could wager any or all of their scores. Whoever was ahead at the end of the game was declared champion and returned the next show, with each player leaving with the money he or she had earned. A champion could return for a maximum of five days.

Later in its run, The Who, What, or Where Game instituted a monthly car giveaway contest in which the champion with the highest winnings also received a new car.

== Broadcast history ==
The show was part of a block of daytime games on NBC during the early 1970s, which began with Concentration at 10:30 a.m. Eastern Time and continued to Three on a Match at 1:30 p.m. Most of these games were known for emphasizing game play over prizes, which were intentionally small due to memories of the quiz show scandals of the 1950s. The Who, What, or Where Game ran at 12:30 p.m./11:30 a.m. Central, opposite Search for Tomorrow on CBS, and sitcom reruns, soap operas, and the games Password and Split Second on ABC. Because NBC ran a five-minute newscast anchored by either Floyd Kalber or Edwin Newman at 12:55 p.m. (before a 30-minute affiliate break), The Who, What, or Where Game only ran 25 minutes each day, instead of the customary 30. Similar to Jeopardy!, which preceded it at 12 Noon/11 a.m. Central, The Who, What, or Where Game proved to be an effective stablemate to its lead-in.

The Who, What, or Where Game succeeded a short-lived show called Name Droppers, hosted by Los Angeles-area disc jockeys Al Lohman and Roger Barkley; it was succeeded in turn by Jackpot. Coincidentally, The Who, What, or Where Game announcer Darow would later host a Canadian-produced revival of Jackpot that aired between 1985 and 1988 on the USA Network.

== Music ==
The music for The Who, What, or Where Game was written by George David Weiss. According to an audio clip from a 1973 episode, at least the closing theme had been changed before the end of program's run, but no further information has materialized.

== Home editions ==
Milton Bradley produced two home editions of The Who, What, or Where Game. The home game format was almost identical to that of the show, fairly unusual for board games of television shows of that era.

== International versions ==
| Country | Title | Broadcaster(s) | Presenter(s) | Premiere | Finale |
|---|---|---|---|---|---|
| United Kingdom | The Who, What, or Where Game | BBC1 | David Jacobs | September 8, 1973 | December 15, 1973 |

In 1973, a short-lived British version aired on BBC1, hosted by David Jacobs. This version had some differences from the American program; the most obvious being that it dealt with literature, instead of just general knowledge. The series winner competed on an episode of the NBC version.
