= The Hardy Boys (1969 TV series) =

American animated television series by Filmation

- Title card
- Genre: Mystery fiction
- Created by: Based on the juvenile book series created by Edward Stratemeyer
- Directed by: Hal Sutherland
- Voices of: Byron Kane; Dallas McKennon; Jane Webb
- Country of origin: United States
- No. of seasons: 1
- No. of episodes: 17

Production
- Producers: Norm Prescott; Lou Scheimer
- Running time: 30 min.
- Production company: Filmation Associates

Original release
- Network: ABC
- Release: September 6 – December 27, 1969

The Hardy Boys is an American animated series, produced by Filmation and aired Saturday mornings on ABC in 1969. It features the Hardy Boys, Joe and Frank, along with their friends Chubby Morton, Wanda Kay Breckenridge, and Pete Jones (one of the first black characters to appear on Saturday morning television) touring as a rock band while solving mysteries. The series is also notable for its opening and closing credits, in which the Hardys appeared in live action. The series debuted at the same time as Hanna-Barbera's similarly themed Scooby-Doo, Where Are You!, which aired on CBS. The series is noteworthy for including the producers' rotating wheel for the first time, which would make Filmation a household name.

== Voices ==
- Byron Kane – Joe Hardy, Fenton Hardy
- Dallas McKennon – Frank Hardy, Chubby Morton, Pete Jones
- Jane Webb – Wanda Kay Breckenridge, Gertrude Hardy

== Production and broadcast ==
Two 12-minute mysteries, based on the original book stories, made up one 24-minute television show. The 1969–1970 episodes were repeated for a second year in 1970–1971. Two live action songs were inserted in the middle of the mysteries and also used for the main and end titles, performed by a group calling themselves "The Hardy Boys". These songs were sold at stores on records and audio tapes under the album titles Here Come The Hardy Boys (Billboard #199) and Wheels. Both albums have since been released on streaming platforms in 2011 & 2021, respectively, by Sony Music.

As of March 2021, ownership of the rights to the series is currently unknown. The last known rights holder (for broadcast distribution only) was 20th Century Fox in the 1980s. However, in the 1970s and 1980s most of its episodes were released on 16mm film, which have been uploaded by numerous users to YouTube.

== Episodes ==
No.	Title	Original release date
1	"Footprints Under The Window" / "Hunting for Hidden Gold"	September 6, 1969
2	"Mystery of the Desert Giant" / "The Viking Symbol Mystery"	September 13, 1969
3	"The Secret of the Old Mill" / "The Missing Chums"	September 20, 1969
4	"The Secret Warning" / "The Mystery of the Aztec Warrior"	September 27, 1969
5	"The Mystery of Cabin Island" / "The Hidden Harbor Mystery"	October 4, 1969
6	"The Secret of the Caves" / "A Figure In Hiding"	October 11, 1969
7	"The Ghost at Skeleton Rock" / "The Mystery of the Chinese Junk"	October 18, 1969
8	"The Shore Road Mystery" / "The Sign of the Crooked Arrow"	October 25, 1969
9	"What Happened at Midnight" / "The Clue in the Embers"	November 1, 1969
10	"The Clue of the Screeching Owl" / "The Yellow Feather Mystery"	November 8, 1969
11	"The House on the Cliff" / "Mystery of the Spiral Bridge"	November 15, 1969
12	"The Mystery at Devil's Paw" / "The Haunted Fort"	November 22, 1969
13	"The Sinister Signpost" / "The Melted Coins"	November 29, 1969
14	"The Mark on the Door" / "The Flickering Torch Mystery"	December 6, 1969
15	"The Secret of Wildcat Swamp" / "The Clue of the Broken Blade"	December 13, 1969
16	"The Hooded Hawk Mystery" / "The Short Wave Mystery"	December 20, 1969
17	"The Phantom Freighter" / "The Secret of Pirates Hill"	December 27, 1969

== Comic book ==
Gold Key Comics published a Hardy Boys comic book series which ran for four issues from April 1970 to January 1971.
