= Animation in the United States in the television era =

Period of U.S. animation when television animation was common

The television era of American animation was a period in the history of American animation that gradually started in the late 1950s with the decline of theatrical animated shorts and the popularization of television animation, reached its peak during the 1970s, and ended around the mid-1980s. This era was characterized by low budgets, limited animation, an emphasis on television over the theater, and the general perception of cartoons being primarily for children.

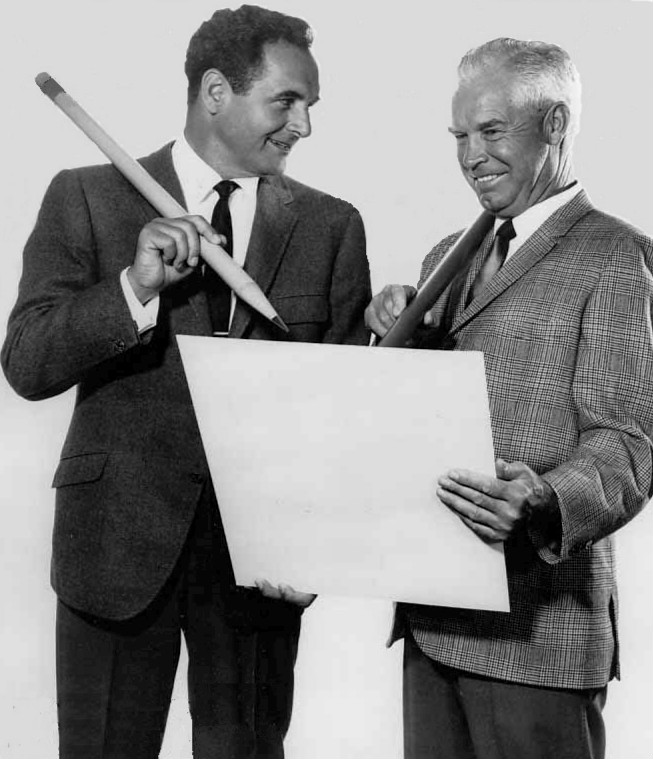
William Hanna and Joseph Barbera, co-founders of Hanna-Barbera.

The early-to-mid 20th century saw the success of Disney's theatrical animated movies, along with Warner Bros.' Looney Tunes and MGM's Tom and Jerry cartoons. However, the state of animation began changing with the mid-century proliferation of television. By the 1970s and 1980s, studios had generally stopped producing the big-budget theatrical short animated cartoons that thrived in the golden age, but new television animation studios would thrive based on the economy and volume of their output. Several popular animated cartoon characters emerged from this period, including:

- Hanna-Barbera's Atom Ant, Dick Dastardly, Scooby-Doo, Shaggy Rogers, Captain Caveman, Hong Kong Phooey, and The Smurfs.
- Jay Ward Productions' Rocky and Bullwinkle, and Mr. Peabody and Sherman.
- Total Television's Underdog.
- Bill Melendez's Charlie Brown and Snoopy.
- Filmation's He-Man, She-Ra, and Fat Albert.
- DiC Entertainment's Inspector Gadget.
- Marvel Productions' and Sunbow Productions' The Transformers.

Due to the perceived cheap production values, heavily limited creative freedom of artists and animators, low-quality animation, and mixed critical and commercial reception, this period is often referred to as the Bronze Age or The Dark Age of American animation by critics and animation historians. Despite this, the era is fondly remembered by members of Generation X who grew up with Saturday-morning cartoons in the 1970s and 1980s.

== From theaters to television ==
=== Early experiments ===
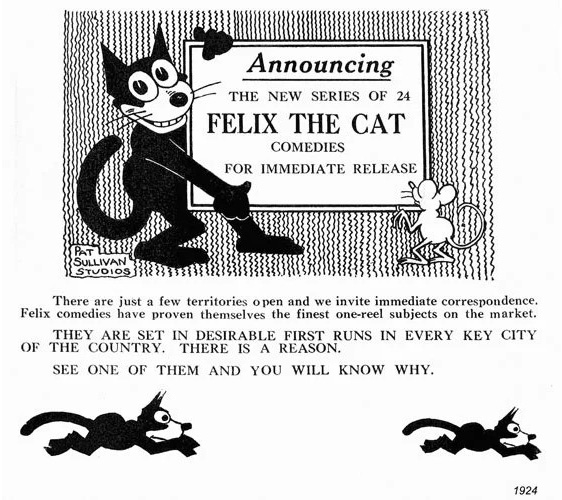
Poster for Felix the Cat.

There were a number of early experiments in limited animation television cartoons. These cartoons usually were about five minutes in length and were episodic in nature, allowing stations to flexibly program them. One of the first images to be broadcast over television was that of Felix the Cat in 1928. In 1938, cartoonist Chad Grothkopf's eight-minute experimental Willie the Worm, cited as the first animated film created for TV, was shown on NBC. Historian Harvey Deneroff of the Savannah College of Art and Design suggests that animator Don Figlozzi drew some of the first animations to be used on television, working for WPIX TV in 1948. Another one of the first cartoons produced expressly for television was Crusader Rabbit (1950), a creation of Alexander Anderson and Jay Ward. Soundac, a small studio in Florida, was responsible for another early adventure serial, Colonel Bleep. Often, existing programs would be a launching ground for new cartoon characters. In 1956, the Howdy Doody show aired the first Gumby clay animated cartoon from creator Art Clokey. Sam Singer earned a certain degree of infamy for his efforts at television animation, which included an animated adaptation of The Adventures of Paddy the Pelican (which may or may not have made it to air) and the original series Bucky and Pepito, both of which have been cited as among the worst of their kind. On the other hand, a long-running series of animated shorts named Tom Terrific was produced by Terrytoons for the Captain Kangaroo show, and this series was praised by film historian Leonard Maltin as "one of the finest cartoons ever produced for television."

Cartoons in the Golden Age, such as the works of The Fleischer Brothers and Tex Avery, contained topical and often suggestive humor, though they were seen primarily as "children's entertainment" by movie exhibitors. Beginning in 1954, Walt Disney capitalized on the medium of television with his own weekly TV series, Disneyland. This ABC show popularized his new Disneyland theme park and began a decades-long series of TV broadcasts of Disney cartoons, which later expanded into the show Walt Disney's Wonderful World of Color. While Disney recognized that the economics of the medium could not support his production standards and refused to go into TV animation, he still ordered the creation of one character exclusive to TV, Ludwig Von Drake. The character's segments would link compilations of the company's archived theatrical shorts as complete episodes.

=== Saturday morning cartoons and TV specials ===
As TV became a phenomenon and began to draw audiences away from movie theaters, many children's TV shows included airings of theatrical cartoons in their schedules, and this introduced a new generation of children to the cartoons of the 1920s and 1930s. Cartoon producer Paul Terry sold the rights to the Terrytoons cartoon library to television and retired from the business in the early 1950s. This guaranteed a long life for the characters of Mighty Mouse and Heckle and Jeckle, whose cartoons were syndicated and rerun in children's television programming blocks for the next 30 to 40 years.

By the early 1960s, the perception of cartoons as children's entertainment was entrenched in the public consciousness, enough so that Federal Communications Commission chairman Newton Minow, in his landmark 1961 speech "Television and the Public Interest," denounced the medium of animation as a whole and compared it to feeding children junk food all of the time. Animation began to disappear from movie theaters; while Disney continued to produce animated features after losing its founder, MGM and Warner Bros. closed their studios, outsourced their animation, and got out of it entirely by the end of the decade.

Throughout the 1960s, it was not uncommon to have animated shorts produced with both film and television in mind (DePatie–Freleng, established by two former WB employees, was particularly associated with this business model). By selling the shorts to theaters, the studios could afford a higher budget than would otherwise be available from television alone, which at the time was still a free medium for the end-user (except for a minority of households that had cable television) rather than strictly a medium for delivering signals from distant TV stations.

Animation on television focused almost exclusively on children, and the tradition of getting up early to watch Saturday morning cartoons became a weekly ritual for millions of American kids. The networks were glad to oblige their demands by providing hours-long blocks of cartoon shows. Hanna-Barbera Productions became the leader in the production of TV cartoons for children. A number of other studios produced TV cartoons, such as Filmation (Fat Albert and the Cosby Kids, The Archies) and DePatie–Freleng Enterprises (The Pink Panther), but Hanna-Barbera had developed a virtual lock on Saturday morning cartoons by the 1970s. Such critics of Hanna-Barbera's style of limited animation as Chuck Jones referred to it disparagingly as "illustrated radio", yet when one show was cancelled, the studio usually had another one ready to replace it because they were so cheap to produce.

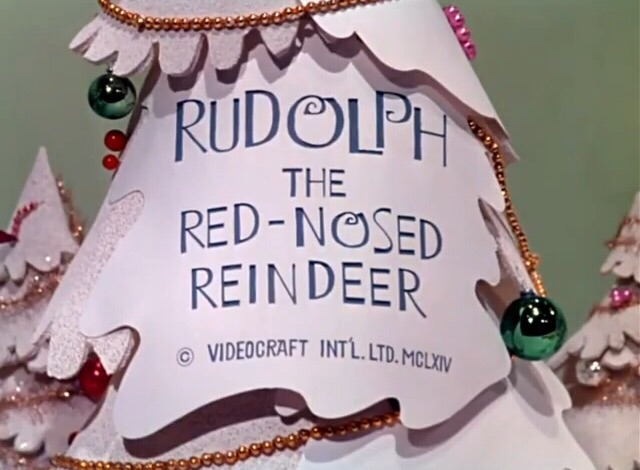
Rudolph the Red-Nosed Reindeer title card.

From the mid-1960s through the early 1980s, several successful prime-time animated TV specials aired. Because these one-shot cartoons were aired during prime-time hours (and thus had to appeal to adults as well as children), they had to obtain higher ratings than their Saturday and weekday counterparts. CBS in particular allowed a large number of animated TV specials to air on its network, and several of these continue to be repeated annually and sold on video and DVD. The Rankin-Bass studio produced a number of stop-motion specials geared towards popular holidays (including Rudolph the Red-Nosed Reindeer, Frosty the Snowman, and Santa Claus Is Comin' to Town); while Bill Melendez's long-running series of Peanuts specials won numerous awards, spawned four feature films, and even launched a Saturday morning series. Other attempts to bring comic strip characters to TV did not have anywhere near as much success until one of the Peanuts directors, Phil Roman, brought the Jim Davis comic strip Garfield to TV starting in 1982, resulting in twelve specials and a long-running animated series.

Though the dominant Hanna-Barbera Productions launched a phenomenon with the 1981 premiere of The Smurfs on NBC, very little else which they produced in the 1980s caught on. Adding to this was the financial problems of their owner Taft Broadcasting, which was taken over by Carl Lindner, Jr., owner of Great American Insurance Company, in 1987. Two years later, Tom Ruegger launched an exodus of H-B employees to form a relaunched Warner Bros. Animation division. In 1991, Turner Broadcasting System bought the company and its library.

Other studios' shows throughout the decade included H-B alumni Ruby-Spears Productions' Alvin and the Chipmunks, Marvel and Jim Henson's Muppet Babies, DiC and Columbia's The Real Ghostbusters, and Film Roman's Garfield and Friends. Additionally, the Saturday morning continued to see attempts to adapt prime time series for animation, some successfully (Happy Days and its spinoffs, Mister T, ALF: The Animated Series), others less so (It's Punky Brewster, The Gary Coleman Show, Little Rosie). After three decades, Disney premiered their first Saturday morning cartoons in 1985 with Adventures of the Gummi Bears and The Wuzzles. The shows debuted with significantly more substantial budgets. The first-run syndication success of DuckTales, which premiered in 1987, eventually inspired a whole block of Disney-produced syndicated cartoons which forced competing studios to improve their own production standards to compete.

The 1980s also saw a number of cartoons based on children's toys, such as Teenage Mutant Ninja Turtles, G.I. Joe: A Real American Hero, The Transformers, My Little Pony 'n Friends, He-Man and the Masters of the Universe, She-Ra: Princess of Power, Jem and the Holograms, ThunderCats, Pound Puppies, and Care Bears. There were even cartoons based on Pac-Man video games and the Rubik's Cube. Some of them even inspired feature films. While many of them were successful with children, shows like these were accused of being glorified toy commercials by parents' groups such as Action for Children's Television. These groups also objected to the level of violence in many of these shows. ACT's efforts to curb these trends resulted in the Children's Television Act, enacted in 1990 and strictly enforced by the FCC starting in 1996.

== Major animation studios ==
=== Hanna-Barbera ===
The first major animation studio to produce cartoons exclusively for television was Hanna-Barbera Productions. When MGM closed its cartoon studio on July 7, 1957, Hanna-Barbera began producing cartoons directly for television, finding an audience in the evening "family hour" time. The first animated series from Hanna-Barbera were NBC's The Ruff & Reddy Show, the first-run syndication entry The Huckleberry Hound Show, The Quick Draw McGraw Show, and The Yogi Bear Show each of which followed a format of three shorts, each the approximate length of a one-reel short film. However, the studio hit its stride in 1960s with ABC's The Flintstones, the first half-hour animated sitcom. Like many of its immediate successors it was originally aired during prime time when the whole family would be watching television. The Flintstones was the first of several prime-time animated series from Hanna-Barbera, which included The Jetsons, Top Cat, and Jonny Quest. But after the end of The Flintstones in 1966, Hanna-Barbera largely turned its efforts to the growing market for Saturday morning cartoons, outside of isolated series for first run syndication in the 1970s, aimed at adults instead of children, such as Where's Huddles? and Wait Till Your Father Gets Home.

Hanna-Barbera was notorious for using common tropes in its series. Its original series of the late 1950s through mid-1960s all featured anthropomorphic animals, usually an adult (who would in turn impersonate a well-known celebrity) and child, interacting with the humans of their environment. After the immense success of Scooby-Doo, Where Are You!, which premiered on CBS in 1969, the next decade of Hanna-Barbera's animated output would follow that show's formula: a group of teenagers solving supernatural (or apparently supernatural) mysteries or fighting crime, usually with the help of a wacky animal or a ghost. The many incarnations of Scooby-Doo ran uninterrupted on CBS and then ABC for 17 seasons. During the late 1970s and early 1980s, Hanna-Barbera turned to adaptations of prime time sitcoms. It was not until The Smurfs in 1981 that H-B once again had anything successful outside the Scooby template; it, in turn, led to derivative series (The Snorks and Paw Paws). The late 1980s and early 1990s saw Hanna-Barbera join the numerous studios producing younger and junior versions of cartoon characters for the Saturday morning cartoon market, such as The Flintstone Kids and A Pup Named Scooby-Doo.

One of the problems with producing animation for television was the extremely labor-intensive animation process. While theatrical short subjects were previously produced in six-month cycles or longer, networks needed a season of 10-20 half hour episodes every year. This led to a number of shortcut techniques to speed up the production process, and the techniques of limited animation were applied to produce a great number of quickly-produced, low-budget TV cartoons. Hanna-Barbera also used limited animation for artistic reasons: with smaller, low-resolution screens, the company's namesakes reasoned that a limited style that focused on dialogue, exaggerated sound effects and close-up shots with bold outlines worked better than the fully detailed animation used in film shorts, which were designed for large theater screens.

Hanna-Barbera had a large library of sound effects they recycled across productions, such as boinks, skids, and booms. These sound effects helped evoke a sense of movement within Hanna-Barbera's limited animation.

=== UPA ===
The UPA studio was one of the first victims of the TV-animation market. In 1952, because of his left-wing social activism, John Hubley was dismissed from the studio under pressure from Columbia Pictures (who was itself under pressure from the HUAC). The creative atmosphere post-Hubley was not the same and UPA's theatrical shorts ended in 1959. In order to stay afloat financially, UPA turned to television to sustain itself. The TV versions of Mister Magoo and Dick Tracy were not successful and did nothing to reverse the studio's financial decline. In spite of the 1962 animated feature Gay Purr-ee (distributed by Warner Bros. Pictures), which featured the voices of Judy Garland and Robert Goulet and a Harold Arlen/Yip Harburg song score, and the beloved animated special Mr. Magoo's Christmas Carol, UPA was shut down in 1964.

=== Jay Ward Productions ===
The Jay Ward studio, producer of The Rocky and Bullwinkle Show, used limited animation in its series, but compensated with its satire of Cold War politics and popular culture and its off-beat humor. Like the earlier Crusader Rabbit, the Rocky and Bullwinkle adventures were multi-part serials. The Ward studio also produced George of the Jungle, Super Chicken, and Tom Slick. It later produced a series of popular television commercials for Quaker Oats cereals Cap'n Crunch, Quisp and Quake. Another company that used the same animation studios as Jay Ward did was Total Television, most famous for The Underdog Show. Total Television and Jay Ward animated productions were often mixed and aired together in syndication, leading to the two companies' shows to sometimes be confused with each other.

=== Filmation ===
Filmation, headed by Lou Scheimer, Hal Sutherland, and Norm Prescott, was another television animation studio that arose in the 1960s. Founded in 1962, Filmation was most famous for its acquisition of licenses to produce animated series based on other media. It was one of the few companies to keep all of its animation within the United States and did not use the aesthetics of limited animation preferred by Hanna-Barbera and UPA; instead, Filmation productions relied on heavy usage of stock footage, rotoscoping, limited voice casts (Scheimer himself provided many voices) and a balance of licensed animated series with lower-budget, live-action ones (such as The Ghost Busters and Uncle Croc's Block) to stay financially solvent (in the case of Uncle Croc's Block, Filmation saved money by producing a show so intentionally bad that it was canceled midseason, allowing them to pocket their advance from the network without producing the full run). After a string of Saturday-morning and syndication successes lasting well into the 1980s (chiefly Fat Albert in the Saturday morning slot and the Masters of the Universe franchise entries He-Man and She-Ra in syndication), Filmation had several costly syndicated failures, namely Ghostbusters and BraveStarr, and a lawsuit from Disney over Happily Ever After, forcing its parent company Westinghouse to shut down the studio and sell off its library in 1989.

=== Cambria Studios ===
One of the most infamous users of limited animation was Cambria Studios, which invented and patented a process known as Syncro-Vox, implementing it beginning in 1960. While the process resulted in an extremely economical, quick and inexpensive product (thus making it ideal for television), it had a fatal flaw that prevented it from being taken seriously: the process involved inserting the moving lips of the voice actor over a still frame of a character's mouth. The result was that Cambria's cartoons (Clutch Cargo, Space Angel and Captain Fathom) contained hardly any animation at all, and were effectively pictures (albeit well-drawn ones that were of greater detail than other producers') with words. Cambria switched to a more mainstream limited animation process with The New Three Stooges in 1965, but went out of business shortly afterward.

=== Disney ===
In the 1960s, Walt Disney's current animated films (One Hundred and One Dalmatians, The Sword in the Stone, the live-action/animated combos Mary Poppins and Bedknobs and Broomsticks, The Jungle Book, and The Aristocats) generated hefty revenue for the studio, as did the regular reissues of earlier animated films. Poppins, in particular, won five Academy Awards (and received with the studio's first Best Picture nomination) and topped the 1964 box office charts while launching the film career of its star, Julie Andrews, who won an Oscar. Walt Disney's Wonderful World of Color, now on NBC, became a Sunday night television institution that kept Mickey Mouse, Minnie Mouse, Donald Duck, Daisy Duck, Goofy, and Pluto in the public consciousness long after their theatrical cartoon series had ended. The anthology series ran until 1983. In 1961, Walt helped to establish the California Institute of the Arts. The founding of the institute was both a philanthropic gesture and a savvy investment by Disney, as the school provided plenty of creative talent for the company in the years to come. In 1966, the studio brought A.A. Milne's Winnie-the-Pooh characters to the screen for the first time in two of four animated featurettes (the second of which, Winnie the Pooh and the Blustery Day, won an Oscar, the last Walt Disney received).

The Disney empire was rocked to its core when Walt died from lung cancer on December 15, 1966. While the studio tried to remain true to his vision (a common catchphrase of the time was "What would Walt do?"), the level of popularity and acclaim the studio received in earlier years eluded it in the 1970s. The theme parks Disneyland and Walt Disney World (the latter having opened in 1971) ended up contributing more to the bottom line than the film division. Additionally, many veteran animators either retired or died, so the studio had to find ways to replace them. In 1973, Eric Larson started a training program for new animators.

The studio's post-Walt animation fare consisted of the features Robin Hood, The Rescuers and The Fox and the Hound, the featurettes It's Tough to Be a Bird, Winnie the Pooh and Tigger Too!, The Small One, Winnie the Pooh and a Day for Eeyore, and Mickey's Christmas Carol, and the live-action/animation hybrid Pete's Dragon. Some of the films got mixed reactions from critics; Robin Hood, in particular, was widely criticized for re-use of animation from earlier films (especially in the production number "The Phony King of England"), but this was done because the film had fallen way behind schedule. Still, all of these films were successful and many of them received Academy Award nominations (with two wins, one for the short Bird and another for the special effects in Bedknobs). Additionally, in keeping with Walt's original intentions, the first three Pooh featurettes were compiled into the 1977 feature The Many Adventures of Winnie the Pooh.

The most devastating development since Walt's death occurred in September 1979, when studio animator Don Bluth led a walkout of himself and 11 of his supporters (a large chunk of the studio's animation department at the time), including Gary Goldman and John Pomeroy. Fed up with the status quo at Disney, he and his acolytes left to start his own studio, which produced the short film Banjo the Woodpile Cat and the feature film The Secret of NIMH. Disney entered the 1980s facing an uncertain future, despite the $39,900,000 gross and some good reviews for The Fox and the Hound,

=== The end of Termite Terrace ===
Warner Bros. shut down its animation studio completely in 1963, and the directors of Termite Terrace went their separate ways. Friz Freleng co-founded DePatie–Freleng Enterprises, which produced Looney Tunes and Merrie Melodies from 1964 to 1967. Warner Bros.-Seven Arts reopened the studio from 1967 to 1969, but the low-budget cartoons produced were not popular with critics or audiences then or now. The new characters introduced during the Seven Arts period such as Cool Cat, Bunny and Claude, and Merlin the Magic Mouse, never caught on, while the Termite Terrace cartoons remained perennial television favorites through syndication and Saturday morning airings throughout the remainder of the 20th century.

=== Chuck Jones and MGM ===
In 1961, Chuck Jones moonlighted as a writer on the UPA feature Gay Purr-ee. When Warner Bros. distributed the film the following year, they discovered that he had contributed to the film in violation of his exclusive contract and fired him. Jones teamed with Les Goldman to form Sib Tower 12 Productions, later renamed MGM Animation/Visual Arts, to work with MGM on the Tom and Jerry series in the mid-1960s; his shorts were not as popular as the Hanna-Barbera originals but more so than the Gene Deitch shorts produced overseas in the early 1960s. Jones then began producing a number of successful animated TV specials. His most famous special was How the Grinch Stole Christmas!, a 1966 CBS adaptation of the Dr. Seuss story that still remains popular and has been released on video and DVD several times. Jones also produced three animated adaptations of short stories from Rudyard Kipling's The Jungle Book, a full-length MGM feature film entitled The Phantom Tollbooth, and the 1970 TV version of Horton Hears a Who!

=== DePatie–Freleng ===
After leaving the remnants of Termite Terrace behind for good, Friz Freleng and his new partner David H. DePatie went on to produce the Pink Panther cartoons during the 1960s and 1970s, with the cartoons appearing almost simultaneously on television and in theaters through a distribution deal with United Artists. Freleng also produced several TV specials based on Dr. Seuss books throughout the 1970s, including The Cat in the Hat and The Lorax.

In 1981, Friz Freleng retired, and shortly thereafter Marvel Comics bought out the DFE studio, due largely to its pre-existing relationship from the commissioned shows The New Fantastic Four (1978) and Spider-Woman (1979). The studio continued under DePatie's lead as Marvel Productions. This new studio continued Saturday-morning fare but focused almost exclusively on licensed properties, first with Marvel shows like Spider-Man and His Amazing Friends and The Incredible Hulk, then shifting to Dungeons & Dragons and the long-lasting Muppet Babies. Sunbow Productions, commissioned by Hasbro, began farming out animation to Marvel Productions for toy merchandising, first as commercials, then as syndicated series, like action-oriented cartoons such as G.I. Joe: A Real American Hero and The Transformers, and later with My Little Pony 'n Friends and Jem and the Holograms. Marvel Productions found a new audience among young viewers, but was hampered by the collapse of the syndication market and multiple changes in ownership.

== Counterculture ==
The majority of American animation came to be dominated by limited animation made for TV and aimed primarily at children. However, there were a number of attempts to challenge this perception during the late 1960s and 1970s with ambitious (and often controversial) animated projects that were often not for children.

=== Yellow Submarine ===
In 1968, the music of The Beatles and the Peter Max-inspired psychedelic artwork of Canadian-born animator George Dunning came together to create Yellow Submarine. Displeased with the previous animated television series depicting themselves, the Beatles themselves had reservations about the project at first and declined to participate beyond providing a mix of older and original musical recordings. However, they were impressed enough with the finished film to appear in a live action epilogue.

=== Ralph Bakshi ===
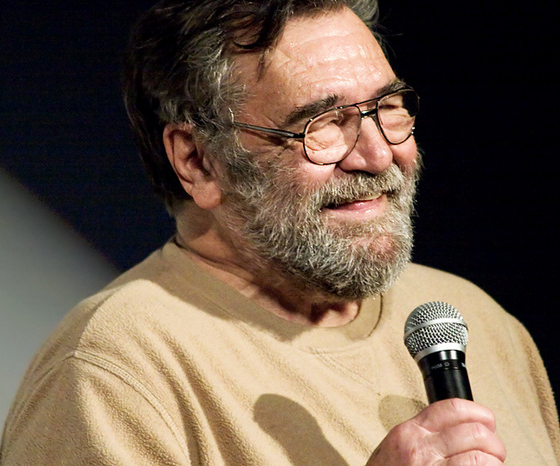
Ralph Bakshi tried to establish an alternative to mainstream animation through independent and adult-oriented productions in the 1970s.

In 1968, Ralph Bakshi, along with producer Steve Krantz, founded Bakshi Productions, establishing the studio as an alternative to mainstream animation by producing animation his own way and accelerating the advancement of female and minority animators. He also paid his employees a higher salary than any other studio at that time. In 1969, Ralph's Spot was founded as a division of Bakshi Productions to produce commercials for Coca-Cola and Max, the 2000-Year-Old Mouse, a series of educational shorts paid for by Encyclopædia Britannica. Bakshi was quoted in a 1971 article for the Los Angeles Times as saying that the idea of "grown men sitting in cubicles drawing butterflies floating over a field of flowers, while American planes are dropping bombs in Vietnam and kids are marching in the streets, is ludicrous." Bakshi soon developed Heavy Traffic, a tale of inner-city street life. However, Krantz told Bakshi that studio executives would be unwilling to fund the film because of its content and Bakshi's lack of film experience. While browsing the East Side Book Store on St. Mark's Place, Bakshi came across a copy of R. Crumb's Fritz the Cat. Impressed by Crumb's sharp satire, Bakshi purchased the book and suggested to Krantz that it would work as a film.

Fritz the Cat was the first animated film to receive an X rating from the MPAA, and is the highest grossing independent animated film of all time. With the success of his second film, Heavy Traffic, Bakshi became the first person in the animation industry since Walt Disney to have two financially successful films released back-to-back.

=== Music videos ===
Fine Arts Films, a studio founded by John David Wilson with offices in Hollywood and in England, became best known for its music videos beginning in the mid-1970s (e.g. Bob Dylan's "You Gotta Serve Somebody"). Several of the videos appeared on the American variety show The Sonny & Cher Comedy Hour (these shorts were compiled into The Fantastic All-Electric Music Movie), and one appeared as the opening sequence and title track to the hit film Grease.

The 1980s also saw the rise of a broader music video industry, beginning with Michael Nesmith's series Pop Clips and brought to full fruition by the first 24/7 music video channel in the United States MTV. Artistic experimentation in these short films often resulted in the production of innovative animated sequences that reminded viewers of the potential of animation as something other than Saturday morning cartoons. A number of memorable animated videos were produced during the heyday of MTV, including a-ha's "Take On Me" by British director Steve Barron; Peter Gabriel's "Sledgehammer" with animation by Aardman Animations and Brothers Quay; the groundbreaking computer-animated Dire Straits' "Money for Nothing" directed by Steve Barron; and The Rolling Stones' "Harlem Shuffle" with animated sequences directed by Ralph Bakshi and John Kricfalusi. MTV also had a plethora of wild and experimental animated idents, made by uncredited animators.

=== Japanese Anime comes to the United States ===
Throughout this period, Japanese anime productions made a limited impact on the US market. The most notable work were the television series like Astro Boy, Gigantor, Kimba the White Lion, and Speed Racer in the 1960s; Mazinger Z, Battle of the Planets, Star Blazers, and Tales of Magic in the late 1970s; and Force Five, Astro Boy (1980), Voltron, Leo the Lion, Belle and Sebastian, Robotech, The Adventures of the Little Prince, Galaxy Express 999, Ulysses 31, The Mysterious Cities of Gold, Captain Harlock and the Queen of a Thousand Years, Macron 1, and Saber Rider and the Star Sheriffs in the 1980s. As a rule, the imported series were heavily reworked through edits and dubbing to match American expectations and stereotypes. For this reason, Mazinger Z, Battle of the Planets, and Astro Boy (1980) were dubbed a second time to Americanize them more and reappeared in 1985–86, the first two retitled Tranzor Z and G-Force: Guardians of Space. Imports were also heavily censored to make them acceptable to parents; Star Blazers and Robotech were partial exceptions. Syndicated series stopped after the failure of Captain Harlock, Macron 1, and Saber Rider, and only Nickelodeon and HBO would program child-oriented anime through the end of the 1980s. The production companies Harmony Gold and WEP abandoned anime on the American television, but Saban would go on to play a key role in the anime boom of the mid-90s. Although their impact on visual style and storytelling in the USA was minimal for decades, the success of some of these series helped create the groundswell that would lead to mail-order VHS releases of adult-oriented movies and OVAs in the late 1980s.

=== Other animation ===
A few attempts were made to produce independent feature-length animated films in the 1970s. Several of these were decidedly adult-oriented productions from outside the United States, including the Canadian Heavy Metal, the English Watership Down and a live-action/animated version of the Pink Floyd concept album The Wall, all of which received wide release in the United States. Other films like Richard Williams' Raggedy Ann & Andy: A Musical Adventure were less successful. The industry largely continued to ignore or dismiss animation as something only kids watched on Saturday morning television, not to mention that some feature-length animations became less viable than TV animations. A notable exception was a series of films based on the Peanuts franchise, beginning with the 1969 film A Boy Named Charlie Brown, which was both a commercial and critical success; the films were made with the same production team behind the acclaimed Peanuts television specials that were airing throughout the time period, led by Bill Melendez.

This era also saw a number of independent animated short films that were rarely seen outside of "art house" movie theaters. As the Hollywood animation studios faded, a number of independent producers of animation continued to make experimental, artistic animated films that explored new artistic territory in the medium of animation. Short films such as Thank You Mask Man, Bambi Meets Godzilla, Lupo the Butcher, and many others were almost unknown to mainstream audiences; however, these independent animated films continued to keep the yearly category of the Academy Award for Animated Short Film alive, as well as introducing a number of new names into the field of animation—names that would begin to bring change to the industry in the 1980s.

== End of the era ==
By the end of the 1980s, most of the Golden-Age animators had retired or died, and their younger successors were ready to change the industry and the way in which animation was perceived. This led to the Renaissance age of American animation, with very highly-quality animated television cartoon shows like such as The Simpsons, Tiny Toon Adventures, The Ren & Stimpy Show, Rugrats, Batman: The Animated Series, Batman Beyond, Animaniacs, Pinky and the Brain, Spider-Man: The Animated Series, and the Disney Renaissance films.

== Legacy and influence ==
This era has been continued to be satirized and/or spoofed even by the likes of the cult sci-fi series Futurama in the episode "Saturday Morning Fun Pit".

The soundtrack to the Emmy-winning special A Charlie Brown Christmas was inducted to the National Recording Registry in 2012.

Paul Driessen's The Killing of an Egg (1977) influenced SpongeBob SquarePants creator Stephen Hillenburg to consider the field of animation after he saw it at the International Tournée of Animation.

The Simpsons was heavily influenced by The Flintstones.

Quasi at the Quackadero (1975) (which was part of the 1994 book survey of The 50 Greatest Cartoons) and the Oscar-winning shorts The Hole (1962) and Frank Film (1973) were each inducted into the National Film Registry.

Disney animator and director Byron Howard admitted that Robin Hood was his favorite film while growing up and cited it as a major influence on his 2016's Academy Award-winning Zootopia. The song "Whistle-Stop" was sped up and used in the Hampster Dance, one of the earliest internet memes, and later used at normal speed in the Super Bowl XLVIII commercial for T-Mobile. The song "Oo De Lally" was featured in a 2015 commercial for Android which shows animals of different species playing together.

The Yuletide specials of Rankin/Bass have been parodied by the likes of TV series from Saturday Night Live to South Park, while non-holiday works like The Last Unicorn maintained a cult following.

The Netflix animated series Saturday Morning All Star Hits! also spoofs the mid-1980s to early 1990s era of TV animation, such as Thundercats, Care Bears, and Denver, the Last Dinosaur.

== See also ==
- Saturday-morning cartoon
- Silver Age of Comic Books
- Bronze Age of Comic Books
- Limited animation
- Weekday cartoon
- List of weekday cartoons
- Network era
- New Hollywood
