= Saturday-morning cartoon =

Genre of television programming

"Saturday-morning cartoon" is a colloquial term for original animated series and live-action programming typically scheduled on Saturday and Sunday mornings in the United States on the "Big Three" television networks. The genre was a tradition broadly ranging from 1963 until 2016, with its popularity declining over time due to changing cultural norms, increased competition from formats available at all times, and heavier media regulations. In the last years of the genre's existence, Saturday-morning and Sunday-morning cartoons were primarily created and aired on major networks to meet "educational and informational" (E/I) requirements. Minor television networks, in addition to the non-commercial PBS in some markets, continued to air animated programming on Saturday and Sunday while partially meeting those mandates.

In the United States, the generally accepted times for these and other children's programs to air on Saturday mornings were from 8:00 a.m. to approximately 1:00 p.m. or 2:00 p.m. Eastern Time Zone. Until the late 1970s, American networks also had a schedule of children's programming on Sunday mornings, though most programs at this time were rebroadcasts of Saturday-morning shows that were already out of production. In some markets, some shows were pre-empted in favor of syndicated or other types of local programming.

== History ==
=== 1950s–60s: Early years ===
After the Paramount Decree broke up block booking practices, in the 1950s, animation production began shifting from theatrical shorts to television animation. Jason Mittel argues that by the end of the 1960s, this shift to television also unintentionally shifted popular understandings of animation. With the rise of the Saturday morning cartoon block, Mittel observes that animation transformed from "a mass-market genre with so-called 'kidult' appeal and became marginalized into the kid-only Saturday morning periphery." Until 1963, the Saturday morning programming block across all three major networks consisted primarily of telecasts of older cartoons made for movie theaters, reruns of animated series originally broadcast in prime time or reruns of younger skewing live-action television series such as My Friend Flicka or Sky King.

=== 1960s: Rise of original programming ===
Beginning with the 1963–64 television season, CBS took the first steps in setting up Saturday morning programming block made up of two hours of back-to-back animated series. The block consisted of acquired programs Tennessee Tuxedo and His Tales and The Quick Draw McGraw Show after the two had been seen in first-run syndication and pairing them with returning series The Alvin Show and Mighty Mouse Playhouse. The block attracted major sponsorship from Kellogg's and General Mills which in turn led to CBS expanding the Saturday morning schedule to three hours with the addition of Linus the Lionhearted and a repackage of Tom and Jerry shorts presented as The Tom and Jerry Show.

During the 1966–67 television season, then head of CBS' daytime programming Fred Silverman recognized the viewership attraction of cartoons and restructured the programming block around 4 and a half hours of back-to-back animated series which saw CBS take first place in the ratings. As a result of the season's success, the slot across all three networks for the remainder of the 1960s would be dominated by superhero and action cartoon series, influenced by the success of Space Ghost and The New Adventures of Superman.

At the time, the practice with networks ordering animated series was to order a batch of episodes and air them over the course of a predetermined cycle. CBS and ABC would typically order an average of 16 episodes to run six times over the course of two years, while NBC's orders were characterized by 13 episode batches to run 4 times over the year in order to cover the 52 week television schedule. The price per episode for these half-hour series ranged anywhere from $48,000 to $62,000 with networks engaging in competitive bidding for the series which would remain the standard practice for these shows into the seventies. Despite the success experienced by these cartoons, they were heavily criticized by parents for their violence. Other criticisms came about from those who worked within the industry such as Stan Lee who was initially enthusiastic for the animated series of The Fantastic Four and 1967 Spider-Man series based on the comics he co-created, only to react with disappointment upon seeing how simplified and dumbed down the writing was. Lee attempted to voice input to both Spider-Man producer Krantz Films and The Fantastic Four producer Hanna-Barbera, but gave up after determining their concerns were more aligned with pleasing the sponsors and not with the quality of the show itself.

=== 1970s: Regulatory changes ===
By 1968, concerns about television violence came more to the forefront of social and political discourse in the wake of the assassinations of Martin Luther King Jr. and Robert F. Kennedy. In addition to concerns surrounding violence, additional concerns were raised about advertising to children with a notable instance involving the popular Preschool children's television series Romper Room which advertised its own line of toys within the show presented by the host with the lobbying group Action for Children's Television (ACT) successfully forcing WHDH to conform to Federal Communications Commission (FCC) restrictions. The increased scrutiny of television violence in the wake of increased political scrutiny and social aversion to violence on television led to the networks adopting internal censors, who would sit in on writing sessions and veto any violent or suggestive content.

This approach by the networks was criticized by animation industry veterans such as Walter Lantz and Friz Freleng, who felt the connection between cartoon violence and real life violence was dubious. Others such as Norman Maurer detailed frustrations with outlandish concerns of the censors, such as having to change a scene from Josie and the Pussycats due to concerns from CBS that having the characters hide in a plate of spaghetti to hide from a monster would lead to kids putting their pet cats in spaghetti.

By 1972, most action programming had been removed from the Saturday-morning slot, following pressure from parents' lobbying groups such as Action for Children's Television (ACT). These groups voiced concerns about the presentation of commercialism, violence, anti-social attitudes and stereotypes in Saturday-morning cartoons. By the 1970s, these groups exercised enough influence, especially with the U.S. Congress and the FCC, that the television networks felt compelled to impose more stringent content rules for the animation houses. Fred Silverman, who at the time was head of CBS' daytime programming and brought about many of these action-oriented cartoons with his "superhero morning" initiative, refuted the claims that ACT and parental concerns were the deciding factor in the decline of these shows and instead said that ratings for superhero cartoons in general had begun to slip by the end of the 1960s and that declining ratings were a greater deciding factor than parental advocacy groups for causing these series to be phased out. In 1973, ACT tried to get advertising banned from children's broadcasting altogether, but ultimately compromised with the National Association of Broadcasters (NAB) which saw advertising limited to twelve minutes for every hour. In 1978, the Federal Trade Commission was openly considering a ban on all advertising during television programming targeting preschoolers, and severe restrictions on other children's program advertising, both of which would have effectively killed off the format; the commission ultimately dropped the proposal.

Action for Children's Television founder Peggy Charren had mixed feelings about the impact of the regulatory changes and emphasized that she never wished to curtail creative freedom or do away with any entertainment others deemed "trashy" (and admitted to enjoying shows others would see as lacking artistic or moral value) but simply wished to see the networks produce things of higher quality with occasional educational value and not just use the blocks as opportunities to peddle shows that were barely disguised commercials. After deciding that the networks would always choose to do the barest minimum possible, Charren would instead redirect her efforts to advocating for funding of public broadcasting for the remainder of her life.

The networks were encouraged to create educational spots that endeavored to use animation or live-action for enriching content, including the Schoolhouse Rock!, Time for Timer and The Bod Squad series on ABC which became fondly-remembered television classics, while CBS had the Bicentennial Minutes and their long-running children's oriented news series, In the News.

In Canada concurrently, the National Film Board of Canada produced a roughly equivalent domestic series called Canada Vignettes and their successors the Heritage Minutes, although they were intended to be aired (as the Bicentennial Minutes had) throughout the usual broadcast day; in a similar vein was the nature-themed interstitial series Hinterland Who's Who. With the 1970s came a wave of animated versions of popular live-action prime time series as well, mainly with the voices of the original casts, such as Star Trek: The Animated Series, as well as imitations of the highly successful Scooby-Doo combining teen characters and talking animals with supernatural mystery stories.

=== 1980s: Deregulation and toyetic programs ===
With the 1980 election of Ronald Reagan, this brought about an era of deregulation and laissez-faire economic doctrine. With Reagan's appointment of Mark S. Fowler as Chairman of the FCC on May 18, 1981, it was determined that the free market would decide the content that appeared on television and not regulations with the previous decade's worth of advertising restrictions and regulations immediately done away with. The 1981-82 Saturday morning season was the last to operate under the previous decade's guidance. By 1982, under President Reagan, the FCC had loosened programming and advertising regulations. On his position when it came to children's programming, Fowler stated:

I believe commercial broadcasters alone should decide what they shall broadcast, because they have the Constitutional right of free speech. It's too bad Captain Kangaroo is gone, but the Government should not be issuing directives about what should be on the air.

Fowler's hands off approach to the networks' handling of children's programming was the subject of harsh criticisms including from Bob Keeshan whose weekday series, Captain Kangaroo, was pushed to Saturday and Sunday mornings as a result of Fowler's policy. Keeshan compared leaving children's programming in the hands of the networks with the circumstances behind the Supreme Court of the United States case of New York v. Ferber involving child pornography, and stated that to do so would leave children open to exploitation of a different variety.

One of the first cartoons produced to take advantage of this deregulation push was Hanna-Barbera's Pac-Man which was the first cartoon to be based on a video game and its success leading to the era of "half-hour toy commercials", starting with He-Man and the Masters of the Universe and continuing with such series as The Transformers and Teenage Mutant Ninja Turtles. These were heavily criticized by ACT, but were nevertheless successful. As well, several more lighthearted series appeared, popularized by Hanna-Barbera's The Smurfs and Jim Henson's Muppet Babies. These included series based on popular video games, such as Saturday Supercade. Other cartoons tried to cater to the emerging MTV Generation and the popularity of contemporary music and televised music videos with series such as Wolf Rock TV and Kidd Video. In November 1988, the 100th United States Congress passed the Children's Television Act (H.R. 3966) introduced by John Bryant in order to rein in the glut of commercialized programming by limiting the duration of advertising in programs for children to a specified number of minutes per hour. However, President Reagan vetoed the legislation.

Beginning in the late 1980s, networks commissioned new series based on legacy properties that would appeal to nostalgia and to a whole family audience, including ABC's reviving the Scooby-Doo franchise with A Pup Named Scooby-Doo and commissioning The New Adventures of Winnie the Pooh from The Walt Disney Company, both series being major successes.

The move was largely driven by the adoption of the people meter, which ABC believed that younger children could not operate and which ABC blamed for the network's poor viewership with its younger-skewing lineup featuring the likes of The Little Clowns of Happytown. The networks had long noticed that much of the Saturday morning cartoon audience already had a built-in audience of parents who also enjoyed the programs as early as the mid-1970s. CBS likewise focused its content on established properties, bringing the comic strip Garfield (which had produced a number of successful specials already) to Saturday morning with what would become the long-running Garfield and Friends and pairing the show with live-action children's series hosted by fictional characters originally created for adult audiences, Pee-wee Herman (Pee-Wee's Playhouse) and Ernest P. Worrell (Hey Vern, It's Ernest!). By the end of the decade, Saturday-morning cartoons would begin to face erosion and splintering of its core audience as American homes widely adopted having videocassette recorder as standard parts of their entertainment centers and cable television offered a wider array of options.

=== 1990s: Changing media landscape ===
Despite increased competition from cable television networks (such as Nickelodeon, Cartoon Network, and Disney Channel), Saturday-morning and weekday cartoon blocks continued to remain popular in the 1990s and 2000s. Examples included Disney's Disney Afternoon in syndication, Fox's Fox Kids, ABC's One Saturday Morning (later ABC Kids), UPN's UPN Kids (later Disney's One Too), CBS's CBS Saturday, The WB's Kids' WB, and Amazin' Adventures (later Bohbot Kids Network) in syndication.

From 1992 however, the "Big Three" traditional major networks and their affiliates began replacing their Saturday-morning animated programming with weekend editions of their morning news programs, and live-action teen-oriented series. Multiple factors contributed to the change, among them an increasingly competitive market fueled by the multi-channel transition, a boom in first-run syndicated content and the introduction of home video and video games; increasing restrictions on advertising, educational content mandates and a boom in fully-animated educational content on public television such as The Magic School Bus and Arthur; and broader cultural changes stemming from an increase in no-fault divorces and the end of the post-World War II baby boom.

Attempting to pair the newscasts with the remaining cartoons was largely unsuccessful because the two program formats drew widely different audiences that did not lend themselves to leading in and out of each other, leading to viewership oddities (such as NBC's children's block having an average viewership age of over 40 years old).

=== 2000s: Anime boom and further changes ===
In North America, the debuting Pokémon franchise quickly rose to success. By December 1998, the Pokémon anime had become the highest-rated syndicated children's show during the weekdays. This attracted the attention of two media companies: Warner Bros., co-owner of The WB channel; and Saban Entertainment/Fox Family Worldwide, owners of the Fox Kids channel. A bidding war ensued between the parties, which was won by Warner Bros.. On 13 February 1999, Pokémon launched on the Kids' WB national television block. The debut episode became the most watched premiere in Kids' WB's history. The success of Pokemon and the wider phenomenon of "Pokemania" in general led other children's blocks adopting similar series to ride the coattails such as Digimon on Fox Kids or Monster Rancher on the Bohbot Kids Network.

The success of these acquired anime series was such that they were favored over legacy series such The Avengers: United They Stand which despite possessing the Marvel Comics branding was delayed in release so Digimon could be given a spot on the Saturday morning schedule. The shift to anime marked a shift in programming across Saturday mornings and resulted in Kids WB's cancellation of many shows which had been built on positive reception through the preceding decade such as Animaniacs being cancelled one episode short of the 100th episode, the cancellation of an additional season of Batman Beyond the creators had been promised, and the cancellation of Static Shock in spite of consistently strong ratings. In place of these shows, were additional episodes of Pokemon and Yu-Gi-Oh! Duel Monsters as well as other imports like Viewtiful Joe and Astro Boy. On the shift that occurred during this period, Tom Ruegger was quoted:

Kids' WB was handed Pokemon for free and it pulled down big numbers—so then they wanted everything for free.

By January 2002, Fox had retired their in house Fox Kids Saturday morning block (citing loss in ratings to Nickelodeon, Cartoon Network, and Kids WB) and leased the time slots to Pokemon licensee 4Kids Entertainment to air acquired licensed content similar to the Pokemon and Yu-Gi-Oh! Duel Monsters series they had provided to Kids WB. Outside of an increased presence of licensed anime content, shows with little to no anime connection were observed by journalists and industry insiders to have adopted more serialized storytelling with a focus on action with influence from the popularity of Dragon Ball Z credited to this trend. In addition to the influx of anime content, Saturday morning cartoons saw a change in dynamics wherein international co-productions became not only more desirable, but a necessity in a more globalized economy with programs taking into account domestic production laws of partner countries such as France and Canada, as well as shifting dynamics of the Pacific Rim that saw those nations' standing change for a position of services providers to production partners.

By 2003, Saturday morning cartoons continued to see a decline in viewership with the most successful programs on Saturday morning only garnering two million viewers. Factors such as recreational sports, the introduction of cable and satellite TV, the Internet and video games, a poorer quality of animation, and a greater emphasis on family time were also cited as reasons for decreased viewership in spite of growth seen in the population of children. By 2004, it was observed that when it came to commercial advertisers Kids WB was the highest rated Saturday morning block but only accounted for 7% of all impressions from child viewers while Nickelodeon and Cartoon Network together accounted for 88% of all impressions (as Noggin and Disney Channel were deemed commercial free and commercial lite they weren't accounted for).

=== 2010s: Last years and discontinuation ===
By the mid-2010s, all of the major American networks had shifted to live-action documentary programs. These were ostensibly targeted at teenagers to meet the educational mandates but less likely to cause a clash with the newscasts, as the programming was genericized as much as possible to resemble reality television programming for general audiences found on most cable networks (or in the case of Dr. Chris: Pet Vet, general reality programming from overseas re-edited to comply with American mandates). This documentary programming also benefited from having less restrictive rules for advertising compared to programming targeted to children. In the United States, The CW continued to air non-E/I cartoons until September 27, 2014, with the closure of the Vortexx block. The final commercial broadcast network to drop their block of Saturday morning cartoons was NBC on September 25, 2016, with the closure of their preschool and E/I mandated NBC Kids. KidsClick, owned by Sinclair Broadcast Group, premiered on This TV and broadcast syndication in July of 2017, and shut down on March 31, 2019.

As of December 28, 2025, Univision and MeTV are the only two commercial broadcast networks to still broadcast animated programming within a Saturday morning timeslot through their respective Planeta U and Saturday Morning Cartoons blocks, as Quest had dropped their Sunday morning public domain cartoon block, simply titled "Classic Cartoons". On May 1, 2024, Weigel Broadcasting announced a partnership with Warner Bros. Discovery to launch a new 24/7 spin-off animation network called MeTV Toons. The network launched on June 25, 2024 and is dedicated to broadcasting classic animation programming from the 1930s to the 2010s, following a similar format to the formative years of WBD's Cartoon Network and Boomerang. Disney XD has short block on Saturday morning at 7AM with new episodes of 2 animes broadcast back-to-back, mostly new seasons of Saturday morning classic animes such as Pokémon, Yu-Gi-Oh, Beyblade etc.

== Legacy ==
This era continues to be satirized and paid homage to in popular culture. Bobby Russell's "Saturday Morning Confusion," which encapsulated the cartoons of the early 1970s ("Popeye and Bluto, Batman and Bozo"), would be a top-40 hit and Russell's biggest hit as a performer. In the 1990s, many Generation Xers were nostalgic for the Saturday-morning cartoons of the 1970s and 1980s. One such example was the tribute album Saturday Morning: Cartoons' Greatest Hits (1995), where Saturday-morning cartoon themes such as Scooby-Doo and Fat Albert were covered by alternative rock artists. The Netflix animated series Saturday Morning All Star Hits! parodies the mid-1980s to early 1990s era of Saturday-morning animation, such as Thundercats, Care Bears, ProStars, and Denver, the Last Dinosaur. The science fiction animated series Futurama also spoofed 1970s and 1980s Saturday-morning cartoons in the episode "Saturday Morning Fun Pit".

== See also ==
- Animation in the United States in the television era
- History of animation
- List of weekday cartoons
- Lists of United States network television schedules – includes articles on Saturday morning children's programming schedules among the major networks
- Modern animation in the United States
- Saturday morning pictures
- Saturday morning preview specials
- Weekday cartoon
