= Modern animation in the United States =

Period of U.S. animation when the animation medium experienced a revival

Modern animation in the United States from the late 1980s to the early 2000s is frequently referred to as the renaissance age of American animation. During this period, many large American entertainment companies would reform and reinvigorate their animation departments following the dark age, and the United States influenced global and worldwide animation.

Many companies originating in the golden age of American animation experienced newfound critical and commercial success. During the Disney Renaissance, The Walt Disney Company went back to producing critically and commercially successful animated films based on well-known stories, just as principal co-founder Walt Disney had done during his lifetime. Disney also began producing successful animated television shows, a then-first for the company, which led to the creation and launch of Disney Channel. Warner Bros. produced highly successful animated cartoon television series inspired by their classic Looney Tunes cartoons, while also launching the DC Animated Universe. Hanna-Barbera ceased production on low budget television series and, through its acquisition by Ted Turner, launched Cartoon Network. Nickelodeon, a network owned by the first and second incarnations of Viacom Inc. until 2019, ViacomCBS until 2022, and Paramount Global until 2025, and Paramount Skydance thereafter, rose to fame by creating the Nicktoons brand in 1991 which led to various acclaimed programs under the label in the 1990s and 2000s.

Additionally, new animation studios rose to prominence during this period. Most notably, Pixar debuted with the extremely successful Toy Story, the first feature film to entirely use computer-generated imagery (CGI). DreamWorks Animation, freshly spun-out from DreamWorks (later named DreamWorks Pictures) debuted late in the era, but would become a major competitor and alternative to Disney in the subsequent decade. During this era, the technology used to produce animation would experience revolutionary shifts. Beginning in the mid-1990s, traditional animation using hand-drawn cels declined in favor of more advanced up-and-coming methods, like digital ink and paint (a modern form of traditional animation) and 3D computer animation. These changes in animation technology led to the millennium age of American animation, which started in the early 2000s and has continued into present day.

== Trends ==
=== Disney ===
At the start of the 1980s, The Walt Disney Company had been struggling since Walt Disney died in 1966, and the 1979 departure of Don Bluth and eleven other associates from the animation department dealt Disney a major blow. Bluth formed a new studio in direct competition with Disney.

Disney's "Nine Old Men", the animators responsible for Disney's most famous earlier works, and their associates began to hand their traditions to a new generation of Disney animators. New faces such as Glen Keane, Ron Clements, John Musker, Andreas Deja, and others came to the studio in the late 1970s and early 1980s, a period that produced such features as The Rescuers, Pete's Dragon (a live-action/animation hybrid), and The Fox and the Hound, as well as the featurettes The Small One (Bluth's only Disney-directed credit) and Mickey's Christmas Carol (the first screen appearance of Mickey Mouse since 1953).

At the same time, animator Steven Lisberger brought to the studio a concept about a computer programmer who is launched into a computerized world. The film would combine live-action sequences with computer animation, which had not yet been used to such an extent. The studio was impressed with the idea; the result was an ambitious $17 million film ($56.7 million in today's dollars) entitled Tron. While Disney's stock dropped four percent after a screening for unenthusiastic investment analysts, and despite only moderate grosses at the box office, Tron received enthusiastic praise from film critic Roger Ebert, became a cult favorite and turned out—many years later—to have a greater influence on animation (at Disney and elsewhere) than expected.

In 1984, Disney became the target of a corporate raid by Saul Steinberg, who intended to break up the company piece by piece. At the same time, Roy E. Disney, who had already resigned as President in 1977, relinquished his spot on the Board of Directors to use his clout to change the status quo and improve the company's declining fortune. Disney escaped Steinberg's attempt by paying him greenmail, but in its aftermath, CEO Ron W. Miller resigned, to be replaced by Michael Eisner. Roy Disney, now back on the Board as its Vice-Chairman, convinced Eisner to let him supervise the animation department, whose future was in serious doubt after the disappointing box office performance of its big-budget PG-rated feature, The Black Cauldron. The studio's next release, The Great Mouse Detective, fared better in relation to its significantly smaller budget, but it was overshadowed by Don Bluth's An American Tail, another film featuring mice characters that competed directly with Mouse Detective in theaters.

In 1988, the studio collaborated with Steven Spielberg and Robert Zemeckis to make Who Framed Roger Rabbit, a comedic detective caper that mixed live-action and animation while paying homage to the Golden Age of Cartoons. Disney characters appeared with characters from Warner Bros., Metro-Goldwyn-Mayer, Universal Pictures and other rival studios for the first time in animation history. The film was a huge box-office success, winning four Academy Awards, reviving interest in animation made for theatres, and popularizing the in-depth study of the history and techniques of animation. Several ageing legends in the business, such as Chuck Jones and Friz Freleng, suddenly found themselves the center of attention, receiving acclaim and accolades after decades of being virtually ignored by audiences and industry professionals alike. Additionally, the release of many older Disney features and short cartoons on home video, and the company's creation of new Saturday-morning cartoons for CBS and NBC respectively (such as The Wuzzles and Adventures of the Gummi Bears, renewed interest in the studio.

Disney followed up Who Framed Roger Rabbit with Oliver & Company in 1988 and The Little Mermaid, an adaptation of the Hans Christian Andersen fairy tale, in 1989 with songs by Broadway composers Alan Menken and Howard Ashman. The Little Mermaid was a huge critical and commercial success. It won two Academy Awards for its song and score and became the first of a series of highly successful new Disney animated features.

The studio invested heavily in new technology, creating the Computer Animation Production System to be used in tandem with traditional animation techniques. The first film to use this technology, The Rescuers Down Under, only grossed $27,931,461 ($68.8 million in today's dollars), not even equalling the take of the original 1977 film.

However, the films that followed, Beauty and the Beast and Aladdin, won rave reviews, received multiple Oscars and topped the box office charts. Beauty and the Beast would eventually become the first animated feature to win the Golden Globe Award for Best Motion Picture - Musical or Comedy and to be nominated for the Academy Award for Best Picture, followed by 2009's Up and 2010's Toy Story 3.

In 1993, Disney released The Nightmare Before Christmas, the first feature-length stop-motion animated film. Disney's success peaked in 1994, when The Lion King grossed $328,541,776 ($714 million in today's dollars) and became the highest-grossing movie of that year. As of 2024, The Lion King ranks as the 22nd highest-grossing motion picture of all time in the United States and the highest-grossing hand-drawn movie of all time. Subsequent Disney films from 1995 to 2000, including Pocahontas, The Hunchback of Notre Dame, Hercules, Mulan, Tarzan, and Fantasia 2000 were box office and/or critical successes as well, albeit modestly so when compared to Disney's early-1990s releases.

In 1994, the death of Disney President and Chief Operating Officer Frank Wells, and the departure of studio chairman Jeffrey Katzenberg to co-found DreamWorks, left Michael Eisner in full control of the company. At the turn of the century, films such as Dinosaur (Disney's first CG animated feature), Atlantis: The Lost Empire, Treasure Planet and Home on the Range failed to meet the critical and commercial expectations set by the 1990s phenomena, despite exceptions such as The Emperor's New Groove and Lilo & Stitch. At the same time, the high level of popular acclaim bestowed upon Toy Story, the first CGI animated film, sparked an industry trend. Based on the commercial success of Pixar's animated movies and other CGI fare (especially DreamWorks' Shrek, which contained numerous jabs at Katzenberg's former workplace and boss), Disney came to believe that CGI was what the public wanted, so it ceased producing traditional animation after Home on the Range, and switched exclusively to CGI starting with 2005's Chicken Little.

Public rifts grew between the animation staff and management, as well as between Michael Eisner and Roy E. Disney. Roy resigned from the board of directors in 2003 with a scathing letter calling the company "rapacious and soulless", adding that he considered it "always looking for the quick buck." He then launched the internet site SaveDisney.com in an attempt to preserve the integrity of the company and to oust Eisner, who resigned in 2005 after public opinion turned against him.

Robert Iger succeeded Eisner; one of his first acts as CEO was to regain the rights to Walt Disney's first star Oswald the Lucky Rabbit from NBCUniversal (Iger did so by offering NBC the services of Al Michaels, a play-by-play host then under contract to Disney subsidiary ABC Sports, as a trade). After Disney acquired Pixar in 2006, Pixar executive producer John Lasseter became Chief Creative Officer at both Pixar and Disney, with a plan to reintroduce two-dimensional animation, starting with The Princess and the Frog in 2009, but was abruptly halted after Winnie the Pooh was commercially unsuccessful in 2011.

==== Television animation ====
After 30 years of resisting offers to produce television animation, Disney finally relented once Michael Eisner, who had a background in TV, took over. The first TV cartoons to carry the Disney name, CBS' The Wuzzles and NBC's Adventures of the Gummi Bears, both premiered in the fall of 1985. Breaking from standard practice in the medium, the productions enjoyed substantially larger production budgets than average, allowing for higher-quality writing and animation, in anticipation of recouping profitably in rerun syndication. While The Wuzzles only lasted a season, Adventures of the Gummi Bears was a sustained success with a six-season run.

In 1987, the TV animation division adapted Carl Barks' Scrooge McDuck comic books for the small screen with the syndicated hit DuckTales. Its success spawned a 1990 theatrical film entitled DuckTales the Movie: Treasure of the Lost Lamp and an increased investment in syndicated cartoons. The result of this investment was The Disney Afternoon in 1990, a two-hour syndicated television programming block of such animated cartoon shows as: The New Adventures of Winnie the Pooh (1988-1991), Chip 'n Dale Rescue Rangers (1989–1991), TaleSpin (1990–1991), Darkwing Duck (1991–1993, also airing on ABC), Goof Troop (1992–1994, also airing on ABC), Bonkers (1993–1994), Marsupilami (1993–1995), the critically acclaimed and still-popular Gargoyles (1994–1997), and Pepper Ann (1997–2000). TV animation also brought some animated feature film characters to Saturday morning, including The Little Mermaid (1992–1994), Aladdin (1994–1995), Timon & Pumbaa (1995–1999), Hercules (1998–1999) (the first three on CBS), and later The Legend of Tarzan (2001–2003) and House of Mouse (2001–2003).

The perennially popular Disney's Mickey Mouse made his comeback and a revival on television with the animated series Mickey Mouse Works (1999-2000), an animated series paying homage to all the classic Mickey Mouse and Walt Disney cartoons. Mickey Mouse Works was later followed by the Mickey Mouse/Disney character crossover series House of Mouse (2001-2003), the educational series Mickey Mouse Clubhouse (2006-2016, which aired on Playhouse Disney and then Disney Junior), and Mickey Mouse/The Wonderful World of Mickey Mouse (2013-2020, 2020-2023). Additionally, the studio produced animated series for Disney Channel such as Kim Possible (2002-2007), The Proud Family (2001-2005), American Dragon: Jake Long (2005-2007), Phineas and Ferb (2007-2015; 2025-), Gravity Falls (2012-2016), Star vs. the Forces of Evil (2015-2019), Amphibia (2019-2022), The Owl House (2020-2023) and more recently, Kiff (2023–present), the studio is now a parent company of Disney Kids & Family (formerly Disney Channels Worldwide, then Disney Branded Television).

==== Direct-to-video sequels ====
DisneyToon Studios was founded in Paris in the late 1980s to produce DuckTales the Movie: Treasure of the Lost Lamp, which is not considered by the studio to be part of the Disney animated "canon". The practice of making non-canon direct-to-video sequels to canon films began in 1994 with The Return of Jafar, a sequel to Aladdin. This was a reversal of the long-standing studio policy against sequels to animated films (which did not apply to live-action films); Walt Disney has often been quoted on the subject as saying "you can't top pigs with pigs", a reference to how the Three Little Pigs short managed to get more than three sequels. Because of strong video sales, the studio continued to make these films despite negative critical reaction; 2002's Cinderella II: Dreams Come True received a rare 11% rating from the review-aggregating website Rotten Tomatoes. Under John Lasseter, the studio brought this practice to an end.

DisneyToon also produced several non-canon entries that did receive theatrical releases, such as A Goofy Movie and The Tigger Movie. The latter brought the Sherman Brothers back to the studio for their first Disney feature film score since Bedknobs and Broomsticks in 1971.

=== Don Bluth ===
Don Bluth's company had been driven to bankruptcy twice: once, as Don Bluth Productions, after the disappointing box office take of The Secret of NIMH coincided with an animator's strike; and again, as the Bluth Group, after the Video game crash of 1983—when Cinematronics, in an attempt to cut its losses, charged fees and royalties of over $3 million ($9.3 million adjusted for inflation) to Bluth's company while it was working on a sequel to the laserdisc-based animated arcade videogame Dragon's Lair.

Bluth formed Sullivan Bluth Studios with backing from businessman Morris Sullivan. Film director Steven Spielberg—a long-time animation fan who was interested in producing theatrical animation helped Bluth to produce 1986's An American Tail. The film was a hit, grossing $47,483,002 ($139 million in today's dollars). During its production, the studio relocated to Ireland, taking advantage of government tax breaks for film production. Bluth's 1988 follow-up The Land Before Time was a slightly bigger hit, grossing $48,092,846 ($131 million in today's dollars) and spawning 12 sequels and a TV series. Neither Bluth nor Spielberg was involved with any of the Land Before Time sequels; Spielberg produced the 1991 sequel An American Tail: Fievel Goes West without Bluth.

To gain further creative control, Bluth parted ways with Spielberg on his next film, the 1989 release All Dogs Go to Heaven. While the film had the misfortune of opening the same day as Disney's The Little Mermaid, it fared much better on home video.

The early 1990s proved difficult for the studio, as it released several box office failures. In 1992, Rock-a-Doodle was panned by critics and ignored by audiences; its dismal box-office performance of $11,657,385 ($26.7 million in today's dollars) contributed to Sullivan Bluth's bankruptcy. Bluth's next feature, 1994's Thumbelina fared a little better critically but even worse commercially, while A Troll in Central Park, also released in 1994, barely got a theatrical release, grossing $71,368 against a budget of $23,000,000 (or $155,026 against $50 million in current terms).

Sullivan Bluth Studios closed in 1995. Bluth and Goldman returned to the United States a year earlier to discuss the creation of a feature-animation division at 20th Century Fox; the studio's three previous animated films (FernGully: The Last Rainforest, Once Upon a Forest, and the live-action/animation hybrid The Pagemaster) had all failed. Anastasia, a musical remake of the 1956 film with Ingrid Bergman, did far better than any Bluth film since All Dogs Go To Heaven, but the 2000 release of Titan A.E., a film far different from the ones Bluth had been making, was a flop. Fox Animation Studios closed soon afterwards; nearly all Fox feature animation was produced by its Blue Sky Studios unit until the Fox Animation Studios imprint was revived, without Bluth or Goldman, in 2009.

=== Warner Bros. Animation ===
After parting ways with Bluth, Spielberg turned to television animation, working with the Warner Bros. Entertainment to bring back its animation department, which it had abandoned in the 1960s. A team of Tom Ruegger-led animators departed from Hanna-Barbera (which ironically would later be purchased by Warner Bros. when it purchased Turner Broadcasting System in 1996) fled to Warner Bros. Animation to produce a new series Tiny Toon Adventures, an animated series that paid homage to the Warner Bros. cartoons of Termite Terrace. The popularity of Tiny Toon Adventures among young TV viewers made the studio a contender once again in the field of animated cartoons. Tiny Toon Adventures was followed by Steven Spielberg Presents Animaniacs and its spinoff Pinky and the Brain. Not only did these cartoons bring in new viewers to Warner Bros., but they also captured the attention of older viewers. Warner Bros., minus Spielberg, continued with work such as Batman: The Animated Series. Batman quickly received wide acclaim for its animation and mature writing, and it also inspired a feature film. Combined, these four Warner Bros. series won a total of 17 Daytime Emmy Awards.

When Disney's feature animation surged in the 1990s, Warner Bros. attempted to capitalize on its rival's success with animated feature films of its own, without the assistance of Spielberg. Their films—Cats Don't Dance, Quest for Camelot and The Iron Giant—failed to come close to Disney's success, although Cats Don't Dance and The Iron Giant both received critical praise and developed cult followings. The 2001 live-action/animation hybrid Osmosis Jones, starring Bill Murray, was a costly commercial failure, although its home video performance proved successful enough for the studio's TV animation department to produce a short-lived spin-off series called Ozzy and Drix.

The perennially popular Looney Tunes characters made a comeback. The older shorts continued to enjoy constant reruns and compilation specials (and a few compilation films), and new Looney Tunes short features were made in the 1990s. Inspired by the success of Disney's Who Framed Roger Rabbit and a series of Nike and McDonald's commercials teaming the characters with basketball superstar Michael Jordan, the studio produced the live-action/animation combo Space Jam in 1996. The film received mixed reviews but was a major commercial success. However, another 2003 feature, Looney Tunes: Back in Action, was a box-office flop, grossing about three-quarter of its $80 million budget worldwide ($140 million in current terms), but received more positive critical reviews. Other modern Looney Tunes projects were in a different vein. Unlike the original shorts, Taz-Mania (1991-1995) and Baby Looney Tunes (2001-2006) were aimed primarily at young children, while Loonatics Unleashed (2005-2007) was a controversial revamping of the characters in the distant future. The Sylvester and Tweety Mysteries (1995-2000) and Duck Dodgers (2003-2005) were very well-received shows and were relatively more faithful to the original shorts. The Looney Tunes Show (2011-2014) was a modern, more adult-oriented sitcom, and Wabbit: A Looney Tunes Production (2015-2020) was a modernized series of Bugs Bunny shorts in the Looney Tunes tradition. However, both shows still received a slightly better reception from audiences than Baby Looney Tunes or Loonatics Unleashed.

=== Ralph Bakshi ===
Ralph Bakshi, director of ground-breaking animated films like Fritz the Cat and the original Lord of the Rings film, returned to animation after taking a short break in the mid-1980s. In 1985, he teamed up with young Canadian animator John Kricfalusi to make a hybrid live-action/animated music video for The Rolling Stones' "Harlem Shuffle", which was released in early 1986.

The music video assembled a production team at Bakshi Animation whose next project was the short-lived TV series Mighty Mouse: The New Adventures. Bakshi and company worked on several other projects in the late 1980s, but his biggest project, 1992's Cool World, was a critically panned commercial disappointment. In 2005, Bakshi announced that he would begin working on another feature film, Last Days of Coney Island, which he is financing himself and producing independently. Bakshi suspended production on the film in 2008, but resumed in 2013 after a successful Kickstarter campaign. The film was released in 2015.

=== Outsourcing animation ===
The major reason for the increase in the quantity of American animation was the ability to outsource the actual physical animation work to cheaper animation houses in foreign countries. Writing, character design, and storyboarding would be done in American offices. Storyboards, model sheets, and color guides would then be mailed overseas. This would sometimes cause problems; the final product wouldn't be seen until the completed cels were mailed back to the United States.

While budget became much less of an issue, overseas production houses would be chosen on a per-episode, or even per-scene, basis, depending on the amount of money available at that particular moment. This resulted in obviously different levels of quality from episode to episode. This was particularly noticeable in shows like Gargoyles and Batman: The Animated Series, where at times characters would appear wildly off-model, requiring scenes to be redone to the dismay of their directors.

== First-run syndicated animation ==
The older Bugs Bunny and Popeye cartoons made way for first-run syndicated cartoons such as He-Man and the Masters of the Universe, Rambo: The Force of Freedom, ThunderCats, Dennis the Menace, My Little Pony, The Transformers, G.I. Joe, Voltron, and reruns of Scooby-Doo, Garfield and Friends and The Pink Panther, among many others.

In 1987, The Walt Disney Company tried its luck at syndication; DuckTales went on the air that September and lasted 100 episodes. The success of DuckTales paved the way for a second series two years later, Chip 'n Dale Rescue Rangers. The following year, the two shows aired together under the umbrella title The Disney Afternoon. In 1991, Disney added another hour; the block aired in syndication until 1999.

These cartoons initially competed with the nationally broadcast ones. In the 1980s, national TV only aired Saturday mornings, not competing with the weekday and Sunday blocks of syndication aired by local independent stations; however, by the 1990s, Fox and then WB started airing weekday afternoon blocks. By the end of the 1990s, both syndicated and national TV ended up losing most of their children's market to the rise of cable TV channels like Nickelodeon, Disney Channel and Cartoon Network, which provided appealing children's entertainment throughout the week at nearly all hours.

== Rise of the "Big Three" kids networks ==
=== From Hanna-Barbera to Cartoon Network ===
The late 1980s and 1990s brought enormous changes in the Saturday-morning landscape. By now, the once-prosperous Hanna-Barbera Productions was beleaguered by several factors. Other studios' shows broke its dominance over the networks' schedules, and once The Smurfs was cancelled by NBC in 1989, Hanna-Barbera had no other hit ongoing series on the air. Additionally, its ability to successfully exploit older characters like The Flintstones and Scooby-Doo with new shows was coming to an end; Scooby-Doo would end a near-continuous 22-year first-run after its most recent juniorized version, A Pup Named Scooby-Doo, ended its run in 1991. The 1990 theatrical release of Jetsons: The Movie was a success for the fading studio, which earned $20 million ($49.3 million in today's dollars). In 1987, Great American Insurance Company owner Carl Lindner Jr. became the majority shareholder of Hanna-Barbera's parent company, Taft Broadcasting, renaming it Great American Communications.

Great American wanted out of the entertainment business, and Hanna-Barbera was sold to the Turner Broadcasting System in 1991. Ted Turner had expressed that he mainly wanted ownership of the studio's back catalog; its launch of Cartoon Network on October 1, 1992, provided a new audience for Hanna-Barbera and Warner Brothers cartoons, both old and new.

In 1989, producer Tom Ruegger had led an exodus of Hanna-Barbera staffers to restart Warner Bros. Animation. At first, the studio was constantly under threat of closure. However, under Fred Seibert's guidance, Hanna-Barbera's new staff (whose ranks included Craig McCracken, Genndy Tartakovsky, Butch Hartman and Seth MacFarlane) created a new generation of Hanna-Barbera cartoons in the 1990s such as 2 Stupid Dogs, Dexter's Laboratory, Johnny Bravo, Cow and Chicken, I Am Weasel and The Powerpuff Girls. Alongside these Hanna-Barbera cartoons, shows from other companies also premiered on the channel, such as Space Ghost Coast to Coast, Ed, Edd n Eddy and Courage the Cowardly Dog.

Time Warner acquired Turner in 1996, and thus inherited the rights to all of Hanna-Barbera's creative properties. This allowed Cartoon Network to begin airing all of the classic Looney Tunes shorts as well (previously, Turner had owned only the Looney Tunes shorts produced before August 1948, which had become part of the MGM/UA library). Cartoon Network's success with original programming led them to move the reruns of old Hanna-Barbera and Looney Tunes cartoons to their spin-off channel Boomerang.

In 1997, Fred Seibert left Hanna-Barbera to found his studio. In 1998, Hanna-Barbera moved to the same building as Warner Bros. Animation; the use of the Hanna-Barbera name for new productions ended with William Hanna's death in 2001. Hanna and Barbera continued to work as Time Warner employees and consultants until their respective deaths in 2001 and 2006; the name is still used for productions based on properties created during the Hanna-Barbera era. Cartoon Network Studios now handles most original animation for the network.

=== Nickelodeon ===
In 1991, Nickelodeon introduced The Ren & Stimpy Show as the first of three installments in Nicktoons brand. Ren & Stimpy was a wild and offbeat series that violated all the restrictions of Saturday morning cartoons, instead favoring the outrageous style of the shorts from the Golden Age period. The series' creator, John Kricfalusi—a Ralph Bakshi protege—was largely influenced by the classic works of Bob Clampett. Despite the show's popularity, it was beset by production delays and censorship battles with Nickelodeon, which fired Kricfalusi in 1992. The show continued under the production of the network-owned Games Animation company until 1996, though many animators departed with Kricfalusi. TNN revived the show in a more risqué form in 2003, with Kricfalusi receiving more creative freedom, but it only lasted six episodes.

From the early 1990s to the late 2000s, Nickelodeon Animation Studio and Paramount Animation also gave birth to many other hit animated series such as Doug, Rugrats, Rocko's Modern Life, Aaahh!!! Real Monsters, Hey Arnold!, KaBlam!, The Angry Beavers, The Wild Thornberrys, CatDog, SpongeBob SquarePants, Rocket Power, Invader Zim, The Adventures of Jimmy Neutron, Boy Genius, The Fairly OddParents, My Life as a Teenage Robot, Danny Phantom, and Avatar: The Last Airbender. Many of these shows spawned successful multimedia franchises, most notably Rugrats, SpongeBob SquarePants (both franchises having three theatrical films and TV movies), and Avatar: The Last Airbender (which garnered both a sequel series and a live action series).

=== Disney Channel ===
Disney had hit animated series from the mid-1980s to mid-1990s such as Adventures of the Gummi Bears (1985), DuckTales (1987), Chip 'n Dale: Rescue Rangers (1989), Darkwing Duck (1991), and Gargoyles (1994). These aired on syndication, the Disney Afternoon programming block, and the Disney Channel (at the time a pay-cable channel).

Further successful cartoons appeared in the late 1990s to early 2000s with Recess and Pepper Ann (1997), The Weekenders, Teacher's Pet (2000), The Proud Family (2001), and Kim Possible (2002) airing on Disney Channel (which switched to basic cable in 1997) and ABC's One Saturday Morning (later ABC Kids). Around the same time, Disney launched Toon Disney, a channel specifically intended for animation.

Disney continued launching successful cartoon series in the late 2000s to 2020s, such as Phineas and Ferb, Gravity Falls, Star vs. the Forces of Evil, the 2017 DuckTales reboot, Big City Greens, Amphibia, The Owl House, The Ghost and Molly McGee, Kiff, Primos, and StuGo. Toon Disney rebranded to Disney XD; cartoons continued airing there, as well as on Disney Channel and Disney's streaming platform Disney+.

=== Broadcast networks ===
Throughout the 1990s, the "Big Three" networks (ABC, NBC, and CBS) were no longer a three-way oligopoly. On cable TV, Cartoon Network, Nickelodeon, and Disney Channel all grew to a point where they were and are still competitive with the broadcast networks around the world. The fledgling Fox network launched their Fox Kids programming block on weekdays and Saturdays in 1990, while The WB joined the competition with a kids' programming block shortly after the network's 1995 launch.

When NBC compared the success of the live-action youth sitcom Saved by the Bell to the paucity of their animated hits, they stopped airing cartoons in 1992, instead concentrating on live-action teenage shows with their Saturday-morning TNBC block. ABC was purchased by Disney in 1996, and Disney transformed ABC's Saturday schedule into a series of Disney-produced animated cartoons collectively named One Saturday Morning. CBS was never able to come up with any new hits once the shows that anchored its late 1980s/early 1990s Saturday morning lineup—Muppet Babies, Teenage Mutant Ninja Turtles, Garfield and Friends, etc.—ran their respective courses. When CBS was purchased by Viacom, which also owned Nickelodeon, Viacom repurposed much of the Nick Jr. lineup—in addition to adding a Saturday edition of the CBS morning-news program The Early Show.

As a result of years of activism by Action for Children's Television and others against shows they believed blurred the line between entertainment and advertising, the Children's Television Act was passed in 1990. It was strictly enforced starting in 1996. The Federal Communications Commission began requiring three hours a week of educational and informational programs intended explicitly for children, at times when children were awake. Since this required three hours to be "off-limits" to programs aimed at the general public, the networks naturally chose to air them on Saturday morning, when children were already watching. As a result, almost every Saturday-morning network show is required to contain some educational content. Fox and The WB worked around this problem by airing short one-hour weekday children's blocks instead of morning news shows; however, those weekday blocks no longer exist (with the notable exception of PBS, which continues to have large weekday children's programming blocks as of 2010). Nonetheless, there were still a few toy-based children's programs in the 1990s, particularly Power Rangers and Pokémon.

Cable networks were not subject to these—or most other—FCC requirements, which allowed their series to have more leeway with content than network shows. The impact of the new regulations was almost instantaneous: by 1997, Nickelodeon had rocketed past its broadcast competitors to become the most-watched network on Saturday mornings.

== Animation for adults ==
The 1990s marked the beginning of a new wave of animated cartoon series, primarily targeted at adults only, following a decade of little focus on such age groups.

=== The Simpsons and 20th Television Animation ===
In 1987, "The Simpsons", an animated short cartoon segment of The Tracey Ullman Show, debuted. Matt Groening's creation gained its own half-hour series in 1989, the first prime-time animated series since The Flintstones. Although 70% of the first episode's animation had to be redone, pushing the series premiere back three months, it became one of the first major hit series for the fledgling Fox network. The Simpsons caused a sensation, entering popular culture and gaining wide acclaim for its satirical treatment of American culture, families, society as a whole, and the human condition.

The show has won dozens of awards, including 24 Emmy Awards, 26 Annie Awards and two Peabody Awards. Time magazine's December 31, 1999 issue named it the 20th century's best television series; it had also named character Bart Simpson in Time 100: The Most Important People of the Century, being the only fictional character to appear on the list. The Simpsons Movie grossed over half a billion dollars worldwide. On February 26, 2009, Fox renewed The Simpsons for an additional two years, "...which will secure its place as TV's longest-running prime-time series." Its 21st season began on September 27, 2009, breaking the 20-season record it once shared with Gunsmoke.

The success of The Simpsons led Fox to develop other animated series aimed at adults, including Bob's Burgers (created by Loren Bouchard), King of the Hill (created by Mike Judge), Futurama (also by Groening), Family Guy, American Dad! and The Cleveland Show (all created by Seth MacFarlane). King of the Hill was an instant success, running 13 seasons. Both Futurama and Family Guy were cancelled by the network; after strong DVD sales and ratings in re-runs, both returned to the air—Family Guy on Fox, and Futurama on Comedy Central, now Hulu. On March 20, 2019, Disney acquired 21st Century Fox, which integrated 20th Century Fox Television into Walt Disney Television as part of Disney Television Studios In December 2020, Disney announced that 20th Television Animation would be relaunched as a standalone unit from the live-action studio.

=== Spike and Mike ===
In 1989, a festival of animation shorts, organized by Craig "Spike" Decker and Mike Gribble (known as "Spike & Mike") and originally based in San Diego, began showcasing a collection of short subject animated films. Known as the Classic Festival of Animation, it played in theatrical and non-theatrical venues across the country.

The collections were largely made up of Oscar-nominated shorts, student work from the California Institute of the Arts, and experimental work funded by the National Film Board of Canada. Early festivals included work by John Lasseter, Nick Park, Mike Judge, and Craig McCracken. Judge's piece, Frog Baseball, marked the first appearance of his dimwitted trademark characters Beavis and Butt-head. McCracken's short The Whoopass Girls in A Sticky Situation featured the introduction of the trio of little girl superheroes that would later gain popularity under their new moniker, The Powerpuff Girls.

The festival gradually became a program of films called Spike and Mike's Sick and Twisted Festival of Animation, an underground movement for adult humor and subject matter.

=== Cartoon Network and Adult Swim ===
In 1994, the American cable television network Cartoon Network approved a new series entitled Space Ghost: Coast to Coast. In a particularly postmodern twist, this show featured live-action celebrity interviews mixed with animation from the original Space Ghost cartoon. It was the beginning of the now common practice of using old Hanna-Barbera cartoon characters for new edgier productions, such as the surrealistic Sealab 2021, based on the short-lived early 1970s environmentally themed cartoon Sealab 2020. Harvey Birdman, Attorney at Law was about a lackluster superhero, Birdman—originally the star of Birdman and the Galaxy Trio—who has become a lawyer. His clientele, as well as most of the other characters on the show, are made up entirely of old Hanna-Barbera characters.

Adult Swim, a scheduling block of adult-oriented cartoons appearing on Cartoon Network beginning after primetime, premiered in 2001. Originally limited to Sunday nights, as of 2018, Adult Swim remains on the air every night until 6:00 a.m. Eastern time. Animated series produced exclusively for Adult Swim include The Brak Show, Aqua Teen Hunger Force, Sealab 2021, Harvey Birdman, Attorney at Law, Squidbillies, The Venture Bros., Perfect Hair Forever, Stroker and Hoop, Tom Goes to the Mayor, Robot Chicken, Rick and Morty, Metalocalypse and Smiling Friends. In addition to American animation, Adult Swim also runs popular anime series such as Cowboy Bebop, Ghost in the Shell, Eureka Seven, the Fullmetal Alchemist series, Bleach, and My Hero Academia.

=== Other cartoons for adults ===
Other TV networks also experimented with adult-oriented animation. MTV produced several successful animated series especially for its adolescent and young adult audience, including Liquid Television, The Brothers Grunt, Æon Flux, Beavis and Butt-head (and its spin-off Daria), The Maxx, Cartoon Sushi and Celebrity Deathmatch. They would continue experimenting with animated series into the early 2000s with shows such as Clone High, Spy Groove, and 3-South. Their original animated programming slowed to a halt by the end of the decade. USA Network's Duckman, starring the voice of Jason Alexander, found a cult following. Premium cable also experimented with original animated series, such as Spawn.

Another successful adult-oriented animated series was Trey Parker and Matt Stone's South Park, which saw its beginnings in 1995 with the short cartoon The Spirit of Christmas. Like The Simpsons, Beavis and Butt-Head and South Park were given the big-screen treatment as Beavis and Butt-Head Do America and South Park: Bigger, Longer and Uncut both of which met with box office success.

Cartoonist Bill Plympton transitioned from print to animation in the late 1980s and has continued to make adult-oriented shorts. Don Hertzfeldt began in animation in the 1990s and was nominated for an Academy Award in 2001 for Rejected.

Feature-length films like Cool World and Bebe's Kids helped establish a market for adult animation films.

== The rise of computer animation ==
The 1990s saw major growth in the use of computer-generated imagery to enhance both animated sequences and live-action special effects, allowing elaborate computer-animated sequences to dominate both. This new form of animation soon dominated Hollywood special effects; the films Terminator 2: Judgment Day and Jurassic Park included Oscar-winning special effects sequences which made extensive use of CGI. After decades of existing as related but separate industries, the barrier between "animation" and "special effects" was shattered by the popularization of computerized special effects, to the point where computer-enhancement of Hollywood feature films became second-nature and often went unnoticed. The Academy Award-winning Forrest Gump (1994) depended heavily on computerized special effects to create the illusion of Tom Hanks shaking hands with Presidents John F. Kennedy and Lyndon B. Johnson, and to make Gary Sinise convincingly appear to be a double amputee, winning a special-effects Oscar. The film Titanic used computer effects in nearly every scene of its three-hour run time; one of the film's 11 Oscars was for visual effects.

While Disney made the film Tron—which extensively mixed live-action, traditional animation, and CGI in 1982, and introduced the CAPS system to enhance traditional animation in 1990's The Rescuers Down Under, a completely computer-animated feature film had yet to be made. In 1995, Disney partnered with Pixar to produce Toy Story, the first computer-animated movie. The film's success was so massive that other studios looked into producing their own CGI animated films. Computer-animated films turned out to be wildly popular, and animated films returned the highest gross margins (around 52%) of all film genres in the 2004-2013 timeframe.

Computer animation also made inroads into television. The Saturday morning animated series ReBoot won a large cult following among adults; it was the first of several CGI animated series, including Beast Wars, War Planets, and Roughnecks. The quality of the computer animation improved considerably with each successive series. Many live-action TV series (especially science fiction TV series such as Babylon 5) invested heavily in CGI production, creating a heretofore-unavailable level of special effects for a relatively low price.

=== Pixar ===
The most popular and successful competitor in the CGI race. Pixar originated in 1979 when George Lucas’ Lucasfilm was able to recruit Edwin Catmull from the New York Institute of Technology to start the Graphics Group of its special-effects division. In late 1983, Catmull was able to bring in as a freelance independent contractor a Disney animator, John Lasseter, not long after Lasseter (then unbeknownst to Catmull) had been fired by the Walt Disney Company for his vigorous advocacy of computer animation; Lasseter was hired as a full-time employee about a year later.

Lucas experienced cash flow issues after his 1983 divorce, and in 1986, Pixar was spun off from Lucasfilm as a separate corporation with $10 million in capital from Apple Computer co-founder Steve Jobs. At that time, Pixar primarily developed computer animation hardware, but Lasseter helped the company make a name for itself by creating acclaimed CGI short films such as The Adventures of André and Wally B. (1984). After the spin-off, he would go on to produce Tin Toy (1988), which won an Oscar. The company transitioned into TV commercial production and projects such as the Computer Animation Production System for Disney. After the success of Tin Toy, Pixar made a deal with Disney to produce feature films. The first of these films, 1995's Toy Story, was a smash hit, which in turn led to additional successful films such as A Bug's Life and Toy Story 2. By then, Jobs had become the owner of Pixar by keeping it alive with additional investments over the years; he had often considered selling it, but changed his mind after Toy Story.

Pixar's string of critical and box-office successes continued with Monsters, Inc., Finding Nemo, The Incredibles, Cars, Ratatouille, WALL-E, Up and Toy Story 3 all receiving rave reviews, earning huge profits, winning awards, and overshadowing Disney's in-house offerings until Cars 2 in 2011 ended the streak when it proved a critical disappointment, albeit still a commercial success. Disney produced a CGI/live-action feature film of its own without Pixar (Dinosaur), but the film received a mixed reaction, despite its financial success. During the later years of Michael Eisner' management, friction between Disney and Pixar grew to the point where Pixar considered finding another partner when they could not reach an agreement over profit sharing. When Eisner stepped down in 2005, his replacement, Robert Iger, arranged for Disney to buy Pixar in a $7.4 billion all-stock deal ($12.2 billion in today's dollars) that turned Steve Jobs into Disney's largest individual shareholder. The deal was structured so that Disney Animation and Pixar Animation would continue to operate as completely separate studios under the Disney corporate umbrella; Lasseter was placed in charge of greenlighting all-new animated films for both studios in his new role as Chief Creative Officer, a position he had held for 12 years.

=== DreamWorks Animation ===
When Jeffrey Katzenberg left Disney to become a co-partner of Steven Spielberg and David Geffen in the new studio DreamWorks Pictures, the studio naturally became interested in animation. Its first film, Antz, did not do as well as the Disney-Pixar releases but was a critical success. However, DreamWorks succeeded in its partnership with the British stop motion animation studio Aardman Animations Chicken Run in 2000, and later the Oscar-winning Wallace and Gromit: The Curse of the Were-Rabbit in 2005.

Furthermore, DreamWorks finally had success in 2001 with the computer-animated feature film Shrek, a gigantic box-office hit that overpowered Disney's summer release for that year, Atlantis. After winning the first Academy Award for Best Animated Feature, Shrek established DreamWorks as Pixar's first major competitor in CGI animation. DreamWorks' commercial success continued with three Shrek sequels, Shark Tale, Madagascar, Over the Hedge, Kung Fu Panda, How to Train Your Dragon, Megamind, The Croods, The Boss Baby and Ruby Gillman, Teenage Kraken. DreamWorks Animation eventually became a separate company from its parent; it is now owned by Universal Studios through its parent company NBCUniversal/Comcast as of 2024.

=== Walt Disney Animation Studios ===
In 2003, noting the growing success of studios that relied on computer animation, including Pixar, Blue Sky Studios, and DreamWorks Animation, Walt Disney Feature Animation announced it would be converted into a CGI studio.

Two years later, Chicken Little, the first fully computer-animated film from the studio, was released to moderate success at the box office and mixed critical reception. On January 24, 2006, Disney announced that it would be acquiring Pixar (the deal successfully closed that May), and as part of the acquisition, executives Edwin Catmull and John Lasseter assumed control of Walt Disney Feature Animation as President and Chief Creative Officer, respectively. Lasseter later acknowledged that there had been discussions back in 2006 about closing Feature Animation as redundant since Disney now owned Pixar, which he and Catmull flatly rejected ("Not on our watch. We will never allow that to happen."); they resolved to try to save Walt Disney's creative legacy by bringing his animation studio "back up to the creative level it had to be".

To maintain the separateness of Disney and Pixar (even though they share common ownership and senior management), it was outlined that each studio remains solely responsible for its own projects and is not allowed to borrow personnel from or lend tasks out to the other.

In 2007, the studio released Meet the Robinsons, which experienced a poor response at the box office despite the lukewarm critical and audience reception. The following film, 2008's Bolt, had the best critical reception of any Disney animated feature since Lilo & Stitch, and became a moderate success, receiving an Academy Award nomination. An adaptation of the Brothers Grimm's "Rapunzel" tale entitled Tangled was released in 2010, earning $591 million in worldwide box office revenue, and signified a return by the studio to fairytale-based features common in the traditional animation era. This trend was followed in 2013' global blockbuster hit Frozen, a film inspired by Hans Christian Andersen's The Snow Queen tale, which released to widespread acclaim and was the first Disney animated film to earn over $1 billion in worldwide box office revenue surpassing Pixar's Toy Story 3. Frozen also became the first film from Walt Disney Animation Studios to win the Academy Award for Best Animated Feature Film. They also had critical and commercial success with Oscar winners Big Hero 6, Zootopia and Encanto alongside (following in Pixar's footsteps) their own animated shorts Feast and Paperman; the latter was shown before Wreck-It Ralph.

=== Independents and others ===
Other studios attempted to enter the CGI game. After Don Bluth left 20th Century Fox Animation in 2001, the company released its first fully computer-animated feature, a hugely successful CGI-animated feature in early 2002 entitled Ice Age, as the first full-length feature film under Blue Sky Studios. In 2001, Paramount and Nickelodeon offered Jimmy Neutron: Boy Genius and TWC offered Hoodwinked! in 2005. Warner Brothers had a major success in 2006 with the Oscar-winning film, Happy Feet, while Sony and Columbia produced films under Sony Pictures Animation including Open Season in 2006, Surf's Up in 2007, and the successful film franchises Cloudy with a Chance of Meatballs and Hotel Transylvania which began in 2009 and 2012, respectively. Universal Studios attempted several times to become a viable participant in the market, finally achieving the goal in 2010 with Despicable Me, the first feature film from Illumination Entertainment, which provided more hits for them within the following decade. In 2013, Dallas, Texas–based Reel FX released their first feature film Free Birds, which was a moderate success, a year later, they released The Book of Life which was a huge success and was nominated for a golden globe for best animated feature.

Despite all its success, computer animation still relies on cartoon and stylized characters. 2001 saw the first attempt to create a fully animated world using photorealistic human actors in Final Fantasy: The Spirits Within, which met with moderate critical success but did not succeed at the box office.

In 2004, the live-action film Sky Captain and the World of Tomorrow was released. It was notable for being filmed entirely in front of a bluescreen, with the background being completely computer-generated; only the actors and some props were real. Robert Zemeckis’ film The Polar Express, starring Tom Hanks in five roles, was a completely CGI-animated film but used performance capture technology to animate the characters. Zemeckis followed The Polar Express with two other motion capture films: Beowulf and Disney's A Christmas Carol.

The use of CGI special effects in live-action film increased to the point where George Lucas considered his 2002 film Star Wars: Episode II – Attack of the Clones to be primarily an animated film that used real-life actors. A growing number of family-oriented films began to use entirely computer-generated characters that interacted on the screen with live-action counterparts, such as Jar-Jar Binks in Star Wars: Episode I – The Phantom Menace, Gollum in The Lord of the Rings: The Two Towers and the title character of Hulk. While computer-generated characters have become acceptable to moviegoers, there have yet to be any fully animated films featuring virtual human actors, or "synthespians".

== Rise of Internet and Flash animation ==
The late 1990s saw the rise of Flash animation—animated films created using the Adobe Flash animation software—produced in the U.S. and elsewhere, and distributed through the Internet.Waldron, Rick (November 20, 2000). "The Flash History". Flash Magazine. Archived from the original on August 2, 2018.

Some popular Flash animated cartoons include ‘’Joe Cartoons‘’, ‘’Weebl and Bob‘’, ‘’Happy Tree Friends‘’, ‘’Homestar Runner‘’, the ‘‘Brackenwood’’ series, ‘’Making Fiends‘’ and ‘’Salad Fingers‘’.

== Animation accolades ==
=== Recognition by the Oscars ===
Historically, despite the continuation of the Best Animated Short Subject category, animated films seldom received much recognition from the Academy Awards for anything other than musical scores and songs. The unprecedented nomination of Disney's ‘’Beauty and the Beast‘’ for Best Picture and five other awards changed things, even though it won two Oscars for its song and score while ‘’Toy Story‘’ became the animated film for Best Original Screenplay. Animation had become so widely accepted by the beginning of the 21st century that, in 2001, the Academy of Motion Picture Arts and Sciences introduced a new Academy Award for Best Animated Feature.

The three contenders for the award were: Shrek, by DreamWorks, Monsters, Inc., by Disney/Pixar, and Jimmy Neutron: Boy Genius, by Paramount and Nickelodeon. The award that year went to Shrek. Films passed up that year included the acclaimed adult-oriented film Waking Life and the photorealistic CGI film Final Fantasy: The Spirits Within.

Hayao Miyazaki's critically acclaimed Spirited Away won the Oscar in 2002. Disney/Pixar's Finding Nemo received the 2003 award, defeating nominees The Triplets of Belleville and Brother Bear. Since then, Pixar has won the most awards in this category with the current exceptions being Wallace & Gromit: The Curse of the Were-Rabbit in 2005, Happy Feet in 2006, Rango in 2011, Frozen in 2013, Big Hero 6 in 2014, Zootopia in 2016, Spider-Man: Into the Spider-Verse in 2018, Encanto in 2021, Guillermo del Toro's Pinocchio in 2022, The Boy and the Heron in 2023, Flow in 2024 and KPop Demon Hunters in 2025.

In 2013, the March 7 issue of The Hollywood Reporter published the ballots of eight different Oscar voters in the Academy. Of those eight, four voters abstained in the Best Animated Feature category due to inadequate knowledge of the subject. They admitted to not having seen all of the nominations, with one person stating “that ended when I was 6.” Such disregard for animated films by the voters themselves is often criticized by American animators, who claim that “Hollywood doesn’t care or know the first thing about animated films.”

=== Annie Awards ===
The Annie Awards are presented each February by the Hollywood branch of the International Animated Film Association for achievements in the fields of film and television animation in the United States. Originally formed in 1972 to celebrate lifetime contributions to the various fields within animation, the awards started to honor animation as a whole, including current offerings.

== Legacy ==
Eight animated features, The Little Mermaid (1989), Beauty and the Beast (1991), The Nightmare Before Christmas (1993), The Lion King (1994), Toy Story (1995), Shrek (2001), The Incredibles (2004), and WALL-E (2008) were inducted into the National Film Registry alongside two shorts made by Pixar, Luxo Jr. (1986) and Tin Toy (1988).

Studio Ghibli's Spirited Away (2001) and four Pixar films (2003's Finding Nemo, 2007's Ratatouille, 2008's WALL-E and 2015's Inside Out) were included on BBC's 100 Greatest Films of the 21st Century poll.

== See also ==
- History of animation
- History of computer animation
- Lists of animated feature films
- List of computer-animated films
- List of American animated television series
