= Weekday cartoon =

Animated series programming

A weekday cartoon is the colloquial term for the animated series programming that was typically scheduled on weekday mornings and afternoons in the United States on many major television networks and in broadcast syndication since the 1960s.

== History ==
=== 1960s and 1970s ===
Weekday cartoons began as far back as the early 1960s on commercial independent station in the major American media markets. On such stations, cartoon blocks would occupy the 7–9 a.m. and the 3–5 p.m. time periods, with some stations (such as WKBD-TV and WXON (now WMYD) in Detroit, MI) running cartoons from 6–9 a.m. and 2–5 p.m. In smaller markets, network affiliate sometimes filled the 3 or 4 p.m. hour with such programming. In the 1970s, additional independent stations signed on running such programming (such as WUAB in Cleveland, Ohio; WXNE-TV (now WFXT) in Boston, Massachusetts; WKBS-TV, WTAF-TV (now WTXF-TV) and WPHL-TV in Philadelphia, Pennsylvania). The programs were distributed on various television stations (many of which were independent stations) through broadcast syndication.

A number of these weekday cartoons, especially the early staples such as Colonel Bleep, Batfink and Clutch Cargo, were serials that aired in daily, five-minute segments (as opposed to the standard half-hour format typical of most other cartoons today). A glut of such shows were produced in the late 1950s and through the 1960s, then syndicated continuously for the next two decades. These programs were usually distributed to local stations to air within their locally produced children's program showcases – which in addition to animated shorts, also included games, locally produced or franchised costumed characters (the best known example being Bozo the Clown), and entertainment to form a variety show. This program model slowly died out during the 1980s.

=== 1980s ===
In the 1980s, independent stations signed on in many mid-sized and small markets. This market was meant for made-for-television cartoons which had grown as a result. Many of these stations started running cartoon blocks on weekdays as early as 6 in the morning and as early as two in the afternoon. There were some stations that had aired cartoons as late as 6 p.m. on weekdays. Most large and mid-sized markets had at least two local stations running such programming in the 6 to 9 a.m. and the 2:30 to 5 p.m. timeslots. Some markets had as many as three. Traditionally, the local stations had been airing reruns of either old theatrical cartoons or TV cartoons produced for the nationwide channels. However, this was soon to change as producers realized the potential of selling their cartoons directly to the independent stations. The first cartoon series to be produced for first-run syndication were He-Man and the Masters of the Universe and Inspector Gadget, both premiering with 65 half-hour episodes in the autumn of 1983.

The 1981 Action for Children's Television made it permissible for animated series to be used to promote toylines and merchandise, and the many series that were created as a result would come to define much of the landscape of mid-1980s children's cartoons. He-Man and the Masters of the Universe kickstarted this trend, and was followed in subsequent years by properties such as G.I. Joe: A Real American Hero, The Transformers, ThunderCats, My Little Pony, and Voltron. The regulations on children's television programming in the United States was instrumental in ending this practice and setting limits to the amount of advertising time which were allocated to children's programs. Currently, any advertisement for a tie-in product within the show, elsewise the entire program will be classified automatically as a violating half-hour infomercial according to the FCC's definition, even if one second of a show's character or reference is seen in an advertising; this clause in Children's Television Act puts the station at risk of paying large fines should the program violate this rule.

In 1987, The Walt Disney Company tried its luck at syndication, through its animation production unit Walt Disney Television Animation; DuckTales premiered that September, experiencing major success and eventually lasting for 100 episodes. The success of DuckTales paved the way for a second series two years later, Chip 'n Dale Rescue Rangers. In 1989, the two shows aired together as part of a syndicated daily block called The Disney Afternoon. In 1991, Disney added another hour to the block; The Disney Afternoon ran until August 29, 1997, when it was replaced by an unnamed block on September 1, 1997, until 1999, which was then replaced by Disney's One Too (a spinoff of ABC Saturday morning block Disney's One Saturday Morning) – and Disney's One Too had only lasted for four years on UPN and syndication, until it had discontinued in 2003. Since then, there are only a handful of local networks in the United States for ABC that broadcast children's programming. Otherwise, it has been replaced by reality shows, court shows, tabloid television, talk shows, and among other programming which are meant for adults.

=== 1990–1997 ===
In 1990, Fox began running a weekday afternoon cartoon called Fox's Peter Pan & the Pirates. In 1991, the network added another hour of children's programming; this block would be known as Fox Kids. In some markets, Fox stations ran one show in the morning hours and the other two on weekday afternoons, while other stations carried the entire block in the mid-afternoon hours only.

In 1992 and 1993, Fox Kids added Warner Bros. Animation-produced cartoons (some of which were previously in syndication), such as: Batman: The Animated Series, Merrie Melodies reruns, Animaniacs, Tiny Toon Adventures, and Tom & Jerry Kids to its schedule. Fox stations also carried other syndicated cartoons in addition to those offered by the Fox Kids weekday block, while independent stations aired Disney-produced cartoons, including The Disney Afternoon block, and other syndicated animated series. By this point, many markets had three independent stations running these animated programs.

After 1994–1996 United States broadcast television realignment with New World Pictures to switch several ABC, CBS and NBC-affiliated stations to the network in 1994, the network's new affiliates under New World opted to decline carriage of the Fox Kids lineups, replacing them either with talk and reality shows or additional local newscasts. In the affected markets, the local rights to Fox Kids programming went to an independent station, and eventually an affiliate of either The WB or UPN.

The popularity of the weekday cartoon lineup increased from the mid-1980s through the mid-1990s. The upstart minor network, The WB, launched Kids' WB, in September 1995, which had initially carried an afternoon block of animated series. At that point, shows such as Tiny Toon Adventures that featured Looney Tunes and other classic Warner Bros. animated characters moved from Fox Kids to Kids' WB. The weekday Kids' WB block initially ran for one hour, before expanding to three hours in late 1996 – two hours in the afternoon and one hour in the morning. By that point, The Disney Afternoon was airing largely on UPN affiliates, along with some WB and Fox stations.

=== 1997–2005 ===
In 1996, the United States Congress passed the Telecommunications Act of 1996 – which was signed into law by then-President of the United States Bill Clinton; among the changes to broadcast regulation incurred by the passage of the law included the relaxing of radio and television ownership limits, and it would also regulate children's television substantially. All broadcast television stations would be required to air three hours of educational and informative ("E/I") children's programming on a weekly basis. With a few exceptions; however, the weekday cartoons were then not considered to meet the requirements set by the federal mandates. The Federal Communications Commission also placed new regulations on advertising content, making selling commercial time during entertainment-based children's programming difficult on over-the-air stations (cable channels, in comparison, would not face the same stringent regulations). The decline of the weekday cartoons began in 1997, as the FCC's new regulations on children's programming resulted in complaints from local stations regarding the ability to make airing cartoons financially viable.

Regardless of the new regulations, UPN attempted to run a teen sitcom block in 1997. It only lasted one year. Warner Bros. would stop syndicating its vintage theatrical and made-for-TV cartoons to local stations that year, relegating them to cable television. The WB, though, continued to air the Kids' WB block and commissioned the daily cartoon Histeria! to meet the E/I guidelines.

Starting in 1998, some UPN- and WB-affiliated stations would scale back their reliance on syndicated cartoons in morning timeslots in favor of airing family sitcoms, weekday morning local newscasts, and/or court, talk or reality series; many Fox affiliates also started running morning newscasts around this time. The Disney Afternoon ended its run in syndication, in September 1999. Disney would then enter into a time-lease agreement with UPN, replacing the UPN Kids block (which debuted in 1995) with Disney's One Too. Disney's One Saturday Morning was on from 1997 until 2002. Still, there was a decent number of cartoons that were available in syndication in the 1990s. And in 1999, Fox Kids trimmed its weekday block to two hours while adding PBS' The Magic School Bus, which occupied an hour of the lineup to meet the E/I quotas for its local stations.

Numerous early cable networks that began in the 1970s and 1980s followed a similar full-service approach to their programming to their broadcast counterparts; this included children's programming blocks, both on weekdays and Saturday mornings. The number of cable channels began to increase rapidly in the 1990s, allowing the different full-service networks to split their programming onto specialized networks. In the autumn of 1996, the USA Network discontinued its long-running animation block, the USA Cartoon Express; its sister block, the USA Action Extreme Team, which began in 1995, continued until 1998. TNT followed in the autumn of 1998, replacing its cartoons with drama series; TBS (as well as its then-Atlanta parent station WPCH-TV) also followed suit in the autumn of 1999 to focus on sitcoms (in those cases, it was specifically to direct viewers to co-owned Cartoon Network and later, Boomerang).

Beginning in 2000, an increasing number of television stations stopped airing cartoons on weekday mornings and/or afternoons. By now, UPN's stations mainly ran cartoons through the Disney's One Too block. Some WB and UPN stations continued running an hour or so of syndicated cartoons each weekday. Fox affiliates for the most part had used the morning time period to run local newscasts or infomercials and only ran children's programs during the afternoon hours. Some Fox affiliates began dropping the afternoon block; in contrast, UPN, WB and independent stations ran their children's programs only either during the morning or afternoon time slots.

In 2001, the Kids' WB block was trimmed down to two hours, removing the one-hour morning block altogether. Syndicated cartoons started to lack station clearances. Fox also ended its weekday afternoon Fox Kids block at the end of that year, with the Fox stations that had been carrying the network's children's block replacing it with talk and reality shows. By 2002, most UPN stations ran Disney's One Too from 7 to 9 a.m. or from 3 to 5 pm, while WB stations ran Kids' WB from 3 to 5 pm. In most of these television markets, these were the only cartoons available on local television stations. Some stations ran a syndicated cartoon or a live action program to meet the E/I guidelines that were necessary. Still, stations lost revenue running such programs.

Disney's One Saturday Morning was replaced by ABC Kids, which would run until August 27, 2011, for nearly 10 years; when it was replaced by a teen-oriented block ran and operated by Litton Entertainment entitled "Weekend Adventure"

On August 29, 2003, UPN discontinued the Disney's One Too block after it chose not to renew its contract with Disney, resulting in the network dropping children's programming entirely. This had left Kids' WB as the only children's program block to air weekdays on broadcast network television. UPN-affiliated stations owned by Fox, as well as UPN's parent company, Viacom, continued to run cartoons syndicated by DIC Entertainment (which were also syndicated to, and contracted out by other minor network affiliates and independent stations), for two hours each weekday in the 7 to 9 a.m. timeslot. The majority of UPN affiliates still ran only one children's program per day, if that. By 2003, The Daily Buzz, a three-hour syndicated morning news and lifestyle program, would replace weekday morning cartoons on WB- and UPN-affiliated stations in certain markets.

In 2005, then Fox-owned UPN stations decreased weekday cartoons to one hour. In January 2006, The WB network's Kids' WB block was relegated to Saturday mornings only after the conclusion of their weekday cartoon block on December 30, 2005, which had replaced the two hours of network programming time on weekday afternoons with Daytime WB, a two-hour block of sitcom and drama reruns; which continued after The WB ceased operations (along with UPN) in September 2006, and were replaced by The CW (owned by both networks' respective parents, Warner Bros. Discovery and Paramount Skydance) with that block being renamed The CW Daytime. That autumn, Fox's UPN affiliates, which became owned-and-operated station of the News Corporation-owned MyNetworkTV, dropped cartoons from their weekday schedules, with some stations only running an educational children's program each day to meet E/I requirements.

=== 2005–2020 ===
In September 2006, Ion Television launched Qubo (co-owned by NBCUniversal and Canada-based Corus Entertainment), which was a three-hour block of programming (and accompanying digital subchannel) that originally aired exclusively on Friday afternoons – the E/I-compliant block has since moved to other time periods, and since settling on Friday mornings (airing from 8:00 to 11:00 am. Eastern Time, a time period during which most children are in school), in October 2012.

Also in September 2006, ABC Family dropped its Jetix lineup, making it exclusive to Toon Disney until 2009 rebrand. "Ready Set Learn" ended its run on TLC in 2008 and became exclusive only to Discovery Kids until 2010 because of Hasbro's partial acquisition.

Later, on November 1, 2008, This TV launched another daily children's programming block called Cookie Jar Toons (also known as This is for Kids); the three-hour block aired on Monday through Friday mornings as well as weekend mornings in most markets. Both blocks were discontinued when Tribune Broadcasting assumed partial-ownership of This TV from Weigel Broadcasting on November 1, 2013 (in favor of a three-hour Sunday-only E/I block), leaving Ion Television's Qubo as the sole remaining weekday children's block on American commercial broadcast television until its 2021 closure.

By the beginning of the 2010s, the traditional entertainment-based variety of children's programs that had been popular for years had vanished from broadcast television, which was now being replaced by mostly unscripted (and less profitable) E/I-compliant programs; however, the decreasing number of more entertainment-based children's shows – due largely to tighter regulations on educational and advertising content has led to a substantial erosion in the audience for children's programs on commercial broadcast television overall due to its limited creative options for producers. The weekday time periods that were traditionally reserved for children's programming are now ceded to court shows, talk shows, reality television, tabloid television, newsmagazine programs or off-network syndicated reruns of network television programs. Many of these local stations still have to air a bare minimum of the weekly three-hour requirement of E/I rated programming that was to be reported to the federal government to qualify for their license; mostly in the early morning periods (on weekdays, this is most commonly between 7 and 9 am), or once-a-week on Saturday mornings just to have the bare minimum of content that needs to be set. Or, the local networks air these specific programming when children have no realistic ability to watch the programming presented to them, because they're at a timeslot when they're at school, an example of work-to-rule or at worst malicious compliance. (E/I regulations prohibit airing the shows at times when children are asleep; however, this regulation also previously prohibited shows from counting towards E/I if they air before school in most administrations, but it does not prohibit airing them while they are on the bus or at school. In July 2019, the FCC revised that rule and opened up the 6 a.m. hour to allow E/I programs to be shown in that slot.)

PBS, which has historically carried educational children's programming as part of its lineup for the past several years prior to it being mandated, airs a variety of children's programming from 6 a.m. to approximately 2 p.m. local time (the time periods ceded to children's programs vary between the network's member stations). Cable television channels specializing in children's programming such as Nickelodeon, Cartoon Network, and Disney Channel (by 2014, the channel's weekday lineup would consist solely of its live-action sitcoms) as well as video-on-demand streaming media such as Netflix, Hulu, iTunes (now Apple TV), Amazon Prime Video, Redbox, television video on demand services and other video rental outlets that also provide alternative ways of distributing children's programming at any time of day or week, without restrictions placed on such programming that an FCC-licensed broadcast station must honor to stay in business or the need for advertising to fund it.

From 2012 to 2016, MundoMax aired one cartoon during late weekday afternoons in the Spanish language making it one the only two commercial networks to air cartoons while adding the mandates, and the only Spanish network that was non-E/I though it broadcast its E/I programming during weekday mornings and weekends. Due to the network closure of MundoMax and Qubo, this leaves only some local low-power independent TV stations to air cartoons during the weekdays while adhering to mandates.

Qubo's original Ion Television counterpart aired for the last time on December 26, 2014; on January 4, 2015, the block moved from Friday mornings to Sunday mornings under a new name, Qubo Kids Corner. This had marked the end of an era in weekday children's programming (including cartoons) going back to the early 1960s. Eventually, Qubo Kids Corner discontinued airing on Sunday mornings on January 1, 2016, returning to air Wednesdays to Fridays; the block would later return to air only on Friday mornings in January 2018 until its discontinuation on February 26, 2021, because of Scripps. All traces and mentions of Qubo Kids Corner were eliminated the week after, on March 5, despite the block still airing on Friday mornings.

In 2016, a new sub-channel network called Light TV began airing cartoons on weekday mornings full time for the first time since This TV dropped the format three years earlier. In late September 2019 it was discontinued as the network winded down operations, thus reducing to once a week.

KidsClick was an attempt by Sinclair Broadcast Group, one of the United States' largest owners of broadcast television stations, to re-establish a market for entertainment-based children's programming and cartoons on broadcast television. Launching July 1, 2017, KidsClick was carried on stations owned by Sinclair and by This TV, as Sinclair was attempting to attempted acquisition of Tribune Media by Sinclair Broadcast Group at the time (when the deal collapsed amid antitrust concerns, KidsClick moved to TBD, already owned by Sinclair in July 2018). It consisted mostly of rerun and imported programming from the past several years, none of which had any educational content. KidsClick ended its run March 31, 2019, 21 months after its launch.

=== 2020s ===
Currently, weekday cartoons are relegated to basic cable networks such as Nickelodeon and Disney Channel for much of the day, along with educational and family-oriented programs (as well as educational-oriented networks such as Universal Kids), and Cartoon Network airs children's programming until 8 p.m. Eastern Time Zone, when the network switches to the teen- and adult-oriented block Adult Swim, from 8 p.m. to 6 a.m. Eastern Time Zone. Other channels focusing on children's programs that are available through digital cable as well as satellite television that feature animated series on weekdays include Boomerang (a spin-off of Cartoon Network, which runs primarily classic cartoons), Disney XD (which airs a mixture of cartoons and live action series), Nicktoons (a digital channel that is dedicated spin-off from Nickelodeon, which is featuring that network's original animated programs as well as series exclusive to Nicktoons), and educational-oriented channels such as Universal Kids (now-defunct), Disney Junior, and the Nick Jr. Channel.

Since The WB dropped its weekday block on December 30, 2005, there has not been any other major American commercial broadcast network that has aired animated series on weekdays (or children's programming for that matter, other than that was acquired by their local affiliates). PBS is the only network that still runs weekday animated series, but it is a non-commercial network. Neither The CW nor MyNetworkTV have aired (much) cartoons on weekdays – aside from early morning, or rules given from the E/I rule, or any of the Big Three television networks (ABC, NBC and CBS), most of which have opted to lease out children's programming time to other production companies.

Other cable networks specializing in family-oriented and children's programming have similarly cut back on animated series on weekdays, though nowhere near the level of that done by broadcast television in the 1980s and 1990s. Even if they were to air such programming, they would have to air it at times in which children are not even awake (5 a.m.-7 a.m.), or they air it directly when they are in school in the morning (7am-9am), and only on certain channels and on local affiliates which choose to opt for cartoons; however – if they have to air regulations on children's television programming in the United States programming because of the federal government's rule on the minimal number of hours that are needed and required. Even if they were to have afternoon programming from the 3pm-5pm, or 2pm-4pm time slots, they will still need to be required to program regulations on children's television programming in the United States programming just as in the morning time slots, or on every network that has cartoons.

In late 2020, MeTV announced it would air "Toon In With Me", an hour long cartoon block which airs on weekday mornings at 7 am, nearly two years after Light TV reduced cartoons to just once a week. The block first aired on January 4, 2021.

== See also ==
- List of weekday cartoons
- Saturday-morning cartoon
- Kids' WB
- Fox Kids
- PBS Kids
