= Peggy Charren =

American activist

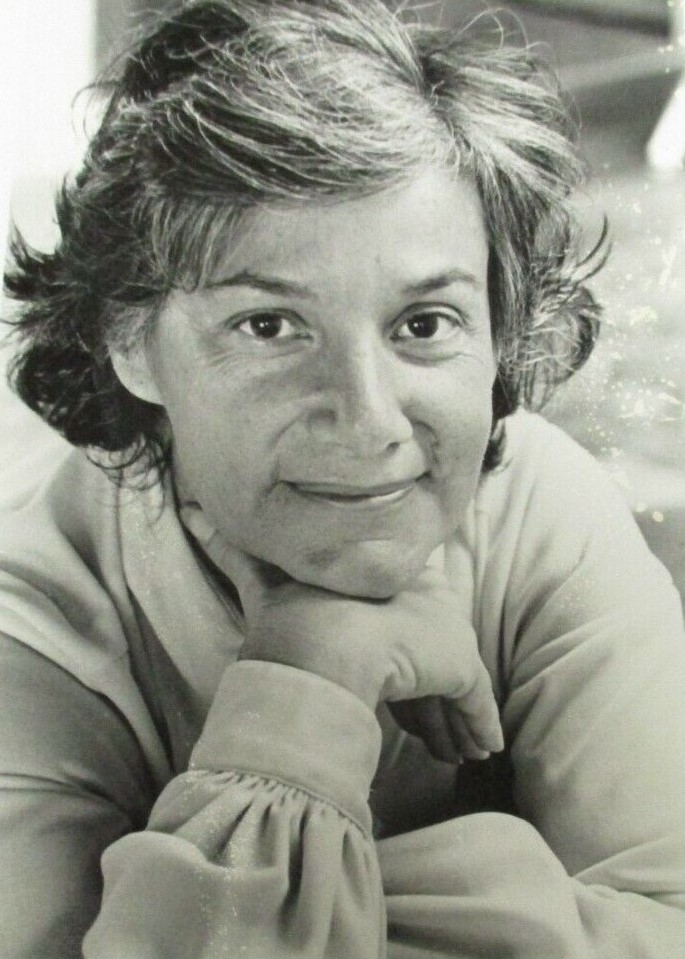
- Born: Peggy Sundelle Walzer; March 9, 1928; New York City, U.S.
- Died: January 22, 2015 (aged 86); Dedham, Massachusetts, U.S.
- Education: Connecticut College (BA)
- Known for: Founder of Action for Children's Television
- Spouse: Stanley Charren
- Children: 2
- Awards: Presidential Medal of Freedom (1995)

Peggy Sundelle Charren (née Walzer; March 9, 1928 – January 22, 2015) was an American activist best known as the founder of Action for Children's Television (ACT), a national child advocacy organization. The organization was founded in an effort to encourage program diversity and eliminate commercial abuses in children's television programming. In 1995, she was awarded the Presidential Medal of Freedom.

== Early life and education ==
Charren was born Peggy Walzer to a Jewish family on March 9, 1928, the daughter of Ruth (née Rosenthal) and Maxwell Walzer. Her grandparents were immigrants from Russia. In 1949, Charren graduated from Connecticut College and then took a job as director of the film department at station WPIX-TV in New York City. She then served as director of the Creative Arts Council of Newton, Massachusetts, and founded a company that organized children's book fairs, Quality Book Fair; and owned and operated a gallery specializing in graphic art, Art Prints.

== Career ==
In 1968, concerned over the poor selection of children's educational programming and child-targeted commercials, in 1968 she founded Action for Children's Television (ACT), a nonprofit organization dedicated to increasing quality diversity in television choices for children. As the Communications Act of 1934 required that television stations were required to serve the public interest in exchange for using broadcast spectrum, she lobbied and pressured the industry to promote educational television programs. In 1990, the U.S. Congress passed the Children's Television Act which required that every television station provide educational programming for children. Though she continued to work on the issue, Charren disbanded ACT in 1992, announcing that it had met the objectives she had set out to accomplish. In 1996, the rules were further tightened to require three hours of children's programming per week.

Although denounced as an advocate for censorship by her critics, including animation writers Steve Gerber and Mark Evanier, Charren has insisted she is an outspoken critic of censorship, and has cited her stance against the American Family Association's campaigns to ban various programs. She sat on the Board of Trustees of public broadcaster WGBH in Boston, Massachusetts. In 1983, Charren became an associate of the Women's Institute for Freedom of the Press (WIFP). WIFP is an American nonprofit publishing organization. The organization works to increase communication between women and connect the public with forms of women-based media.

== Awards ==
In 1989, the National Academy of Television Arts and Sciences awarded her its Trustees' Award. Her work with ACT culminated in the passage of the Children's Television Act of 1990, and she received a Peabody Award in 1991. In 1995, she was awarded the Presidential Medal of Freedom.

== Personal life ==
In 1951, she married Stanley Charren, an engineer; they had two daughters. The couple lived in Cambridge, Massachusetts. She died on January 22, 2015. In her later years, she had vascular dementia.

== Sources ==
- The Paley Center for Media
