= List of weekday cartoons =

This is a list of weekday cartoons that are still being aired or used to be broadcast.

== List ==
- 101 Dalmatians: The Series (FOX, The WB, and UPN affiliates; 1997–1998)
- Action Man (FOX 2000–2001)
- Adventures of Sonic the Hedgehog (ABC and WB affiliates 1993–1996, UPN affiliates 1996–1998, Toon Disney 1998–2002)
- Aladdin (UPN affiliates, CBS 1995–1996)
- Animaniacs (Fox Kids 1993–1995, Kids' WB 1995–1999)
- Archie's Weird Mysteries (Syndication 2004–2005)
- Arthur (PBS 1996–2022)
- Batman: The Animated Series (FOX 1992–1995, WB 1995–2002)
- Beast Wars: Transformers (FOX 1996–1999)
- Blinky Bill (UPN 1995–1996)
- Blue's Clues (Nickelodeon 1996–2008)
- Bob the Builder (Nickelodeon 2001-2004, PBS 2005–2018)
- Bobby's World (FOX 1990–1998)
- Bonkers (Syndication, 1993-1996 WB and UPN affiliates 1995–1997)
- Corn & Peg (Nickelodeon 2019–2020)
- Daniel Tiger's Neighborhood (PBS 2012–present)
- Darkwing Duck (Syndication, 1991-1995 UPN 1995–1997)
- Dennis the Menace (UPN, WB 1995–1999)
- Dora the Explorer (Nickelodeon 2000–2019)
- Double Dragon (unknown 1993–1995)
- Go, Diego, Go! (Nickelodeon 2005–2011)
- Goof Troop (UPN 1995–1996)
- He-Man and the Masters of the Universe (Multiple Networks September 1983–1985, Syndicated on USA till 1990)
- Hero Elementary (PBS 2020–2022)
- Highlander (UPN 1995–1996)
- Inspector Gadget (UPN 1995–? and 2003–2004)
- Jackie Chan Adventures (WB 2002–2005, Jetix 2006–2009)
- Lyla in the Loop (PBS Kids 2024–present)
- Max & Ruby (Nickelodeon 2002–2018)
- The Mr. Men Show (Syndicated, 1997–1999)
- Noddy (PBS 1997–1998 and 2004–2008) *
- Peg + Cat (PBS Kids 2013–2018)
- Pepper Ann (UPN 2000–2001)
- Pinky and the Brain (WB 1995–1999)
- Pinky Dinky Doo (Noggin 2006–2011)
- The Puzzle Place (PBS 1995–1998)
- Redwall (PBS Dec 2001 and Summer 2002) **
- Recess (UPN 2000–2003)
- Rocko's Modern Life (Nickelodeon 1993-1996)
- Rosie's Rules (PBS 2022–present)
- Sabrina: the Animated Series (ABC 1999–2001, UPN 1999–2002)
- Sagwa, the Chinese Siamese Cat (PBS 2001–2004)
- Sherlock Holmes in the 22nd Century (Syndication 2002–2005)
- Sid the Science Kid (PBS Kids 2008–2012)
- The Backyardigans (Nickelodeon 2004–2013)
- The Batman (WB 2003–2005)
- The Legend of Tarzan (UPN 2001–2003)
- The Littles (UPN 2004–2005)
- The Magic School Bus (PBS 1994–1997, FOX 1998–2002)
- The Mask: The Animated Series (WB affiliates 1997–1998)
- The Rocky and Bullwinkle Show (FOX and UPN affiliates 1995–1999)
- The Smurfs (USA late 80s to mid 90s)
- Thomas The Tank Engine & Friends (PBS 2004–2017, Nickelodeon 2018-2019, Cartoon Network 2021-2023)
- Tiny Toon Adventures (Syndication 1990–1992, Fox Kids 1992–1995, Nickelodeon 1995–1999 and 2002–2004, Kids' WB 1997–2000)
- Trollz (UPN affiliates 2005–2006)
- Underdog (various affiliates 1998–2002)
- Where on Earth Is Carmen Sandiego? (Cartoon Network 1998–2002)
- Wonder Pets! (Nickelodeon 2006–2010)
- Work It Out Wombats! (PBS 2023–present)
- Wow! Wow! Wubbzy! (Nickelodeon 2006–2010)
- X-Men (FOX 1992–2001)
- Yo Gabba Gabba! (Nickelodeon 2007–2011)

== See also ==
- Children's television series

== Notes ==
- * Noddy television series is currently aired by PBS (check local listings).
- ** PBS affiliates only aired the series during the summer months (with an exception of December 2001).
