= Action for Children's Television =

US advocacy group

- Founded: 1968
- Founders: Peggy Charren, Lillian Ambrosino, Evelyn Kaye Sarson and Judy Chalfen
- Dissolved: 1992
- Type: Advocacy group
- Purpose: Children's television programming (Aka "kidvid")
- Location: Newton, Massachusetts
- Region served: United States
- Product: None
- Method: Media attention, direct-appeal campaigns
- Key people: Peggy Charren, Judith Chalfen
- Volunteers: 20,000 maximum
- Website: None

Action for Children's Television (ACT) was an American grassroots, nonprofit child advocacy group dedicated to improving the quality of children's television. Specifically, ACT's main goals were to encourage diversification in children's television offerings, to discourage overcommercialization of children's programming, and to eliminate deceptive advertising aimed at young viewers.

ACT was founded by Peggy Charren, Lillian Ambrosino, Evelyn Kaye Sarson and Judy Chalfen in Newton, Massachusetts, in 1968. It had up to 20,000 volunteer members, eight staff members, and an operational budget of $225,000 by the mid-1980s, but declined financially and to four staff members before disbanding in 1992. About 70% of funds came from the group's membership, while the rest came from foundation grants (e.g. Markle Foundation) and fees from lectures and book sales.

== History ==
=== The 1960s ===
ACT's initial focus was the Boston edition of the syndicated Romper Room, a children's show which promoted toys tied into or branded with the program to its viewers.

In the late 1960s, ACT also targeted Saturday-morning cartoons that featured superheroes and violence, including The Herculoids, Space Ghost, Birdman and the Galaxy Trio, Journey to the Center of the Earth, The Lone Ranger, Super President and Fantastic Four. The group influenced, through pressure it exerted upon the U.S. Congress and the Federal Communications Commission, the networks to remove those shows from the air by the start of the 1969–70 television season, and the programs were replaced by the likes of Scooby-Doo, Where Are You?, H.R. Pufnstuf, Dastardly and Muttley in Their Flying Machines, and other light comedy-fantasy programs.

=== The 1970s ===
In 1970, ACT first petitioned the FCC to ban advertising from children's programming. In 1971, then-President of ACT, Evelyn Kaye Sarson, presented the head of the FCC with a petition, wrapped as a Christmas present, asking for an end to advertising on all programs for children. When this tactic failed, in subsequent years, it sought a more limited prohibition, namely eliminating commercials for specific categories of products. In 1971, ACT challenged the promotion of vitamins, usually fruit-flavored ones that resembled candy, to children. "One-third of the commercials were for vitamin pills, even though the bottles said, 'Keep out of reach of children' because an overdose could put them in a coma," said Charren. Responding to ACT's campaign, vitamin-makers voluntarily withdrew their advertising. In addition to petitioning for the FCC to ban advertising, ACT requested the FCC to publish a public notice of their guidelines for children's television. The guidelines included: "1. That there be a minimum of 14 hours programming for children of different ages each week, as a public service; 2. That there be no commercials on children’s programs; 3. That hosts on children’s shows do not sell."

On October 16 and 17, 1970, ACT co-sponsored the First National Symposium on Children and Television. The Symposium's theme was "Facts for Action", which invited guests to discuss the content of television for children at the time. Fred Rogers, a popular children's show host on public television, gave the keynote speeches, "The Ecology of Childhood", which examined the effects of television on children, and "Course of Action", which discussed legal and political ideas that could be used to create change in the children's television industry.

In 1973, responding to concerns raised by ACT, the National Association of Broadcasters adopted a revised code limiting commercial time in children's programming to twelve minutes per hour. Additionally, the hosts of children's television programs were prohibited from appearing in commercials aimed at children. This latter measure led to the near-disappearance of locally produced children's shows on American stations by the mid-1970s, as longtime advertisers on those programs saw no point in continuing if hosts beloved by a young audience could not pitch the companies' products themselves, instead of the station using pre-recorded commercials, which they felt would be more likely ignored by viewers. However, that part of the code had little or no effect upon networks, as few of their shows had formal masters of ceremonies.

In 1977, ACT, together with the Center for Science in the Public Interest, petitioned the Federal Trade Commission (FTC) to ban television advertising targeted at children too young to understand the concept of selling, as well as advertising for high-sugar foods (e.g., breakfast cereals, candy) pitched to older children.

=== The 1980s and 1990s ===
In 1981, then-President Ronald Reagan appointed Mark S. Fowler, a conservative Republican, as chairman of the FCC. As Fowler, a longtime proponent of deregulation, had determined that children's television should be dictated by marketplace considerations, the next several years saw the cancellation of many long-standing and Emmy-winning shows such as Captain Kangaroo, Schoolhouse Rock, Kids Are People Too!, Animals, Animals, Animals, and the CBS Children's Film Festival, all of which ACT had vigorously fought to keep on the air. To ACT, this was an abrupt reversal of some 12 years of progress. That era also saw the debut of many toy-inspired programs, which ACT contended were nothing more than program-length commercials: G. I. Joe, My Little Pony, The Transformers, M.A.S.K., He-Man and the Masters of the Universe, and the controversial Captain Power and the Soldiers of the Future.

Throughout the 1980s, ACT criticized television programs that featured popular toys such as G. I. Joe and He-Man, maintaining that they "blur(red) the distinction between program content and commercial speech," and successfully barred one program, Garbage Pail Kids, from the air. It also opposed the proposed introduction of Channel One News, a television news show designed for children featuring advertiser-based programming, into public schools, an effort which met with only limited success, due to lucrative inducements the company made to financially-strapped school boards of that time.

ACT brought many cases before the courts, including Action for Children's Television v. FCC, 821 F.2d 741 (D.C. Cir. 1987) often cited in media law.

ACT's efforts culminated in the passage of the Children's Television Act of 1990, establishing formal guidelines for children's programming, including rules governing advertising, content and quantity.

Co-founder Peggy Charren commented in 1995, after the organization's dissolution, "Too often, we try to protect children by doing in free speech."

== See also ==
- Regulations on children's television programming in the United States
