= Lists of United States network television schedules =

This article gives a list of United States network television schedules including prime time (since 1946), daytime (since 1947), late night (since 1950), overnight (since 2020), morning (since 2021), and afternoon (since 2021). The variously three to six larger commercial American television networks each has its schedule which is altered each year (and usually more frequently), and the introductions and relevant articles provide a comprehensive review for each year, from the 1946 season to the present.

Public broadcasting in the United States has often been more decentralized, and less likely to have a single network feed appear across most of the country (though some latter-day public networks such as World Channel and Create have had more in-pattern clearance than National Educational Television or its successor PBS have had). Also, local stations can and have deviated occasionally or frequently from commercial network schedules for a variety of reasons.

== 1940s ==
1940–41	No primetime schedule during these years	No daytime schedule during these years	No late night schedule during these years
1941–42	No primetime schedule during these years	No daytime schedule during these years	No late night schedule during these years
1942–43	No primetime schedule during these years	No daytime schedule during these years	No late night schedule during these years
1943–44	No primetime schedule during these years	No daytime schedule during these years	No late night schedule during these years
1944–45	No primetime schedule during these years	No daytime schedule during these years	No late night schedule during these years
1945–46	No primetime schedule during these years	No daytime schedule during these years	No late night schedule during these years
1946–47	Prime time	No daytime schedule during these years	No late night schedule during these years
1947–48	Prime time	Daytime	No late night schedule during these years
1948–49	Prime time	Daytime	No late night schedule during these years
1949–50	Prime time	Daytime	No late night schedule during these years

== 1950s ==
1950–51	Prime time	Daytime	No late night schedule during these years
1951–52	Prime time	Daytime	No late night schedule during these years
1952–53	Prime time	Daytime	No late night schedule during these years
1953–54	Prime time	Daytime	No late night schedule during these years
1954–55	Prime time	Daytime	Late night
1955–56	Prime time	Daytime	Late night
1956–57	Prime time	Daytime	Late night
1957–58	Prime time	Daytime	Late night
1958–59	Prime time	Daytime	Late night
1959–60	Prime time	Daytime	Late night

== 1960s ==
1960–61	Prime time	Daytime	Late night
1961–62	Prime time	Daytime	Late night
1962–63	Prime time	Daytime	Late night
1963–64	Prime time	Daytime	Late night
1964–65	Prime time	Daytime	Late night
1965–66	Prime time	Daytime	Late night
1966–67	Prime time	Daytime	Late night
1967–68	Prime time	Daytime	Late night
1968–69	Prime time	Daytime	Late night
1969–70	Prime time	Daytime	Late night

== 1970s ==
1970–71	Prime time	Daytime	Late night
1971–72	Prime time	Daytime	Late night
1972–73	Prime time	Daytime	Late night
1973–74	Prime time	Daytime	Late night
1974–75	Prime time	Daytime	Late night
1975–76	Prime time	Daytime	Late night
1976–77	Prime time	Daytime	Late night
1977–78	Prime time	Daytime	Late night
1978–79	Prime time	Daytime	Late night
1979–80	Prime time	Daytime	Late night

== 1980s ==
1980–81	Prime time	Daytime	Late night
1981–82	Prime time	Daytime	Late night
1982–83	Prime time	Daytime	Late night
1983–84	Prime time	Daytime	Late night
1984–85	Prime time	Daytime	Late night
1985–86	Prime time	Daytime	Late night
1986–87	Prime time	Daytime	Late night
1987–88	Prime time	Daytime	Late night
1988–89	Prime time	Daytime	Late night
1989–90	Prime time	Daytime	Late night

== 1990s ==
1990–91	Prime time	Daytime	Late night
1991–92	Prime time	Daytime	Late night
1992–93	Prime time	Daytime	Late night
1993–94	Prime time	Daytime	Late night
1994–95	Prime time	Daytime	Late night
1995–96	Prime time	Daytime	Late night
1996–97	Prime time	Daytime	Late night
1997–98	Prime time	Daytime	Late night
1998–99	Prime time	Daytime	Late night
1999–2000	Prime time	Daytime	Late night

== 2000s ==
2000–01	Prime time	Daytime	Late night
2001–02	Prime time	Daytime	Late night
2002–03	Prime time	Daytime	Late night
2003–04	Prime time	Daytime	Late night
2004–05	Prime time	Daytime	Late night
2005–06	Prime time	Daytime	Late night
2006–07	Prime time	Daytime	Late night
2007–08	Prime time	Daytime	Late night
2008–09	Prime time	Daytime	Late night
2009–10	Prime time	Daytime	Late night

== 2010s ==
2010–11	Prime time	Daytime	Late night
2011–12	Prime time	Daytime	Late night
2012–13	Prime time	Daytime	Late night
2013–14	Prime time	Daytime	Late night
2014–15	Prime time	Daytime	Late night
2015–16	Prime time	Daytime	Late night
2016–17	Prime time	Daytime	Late night
2017–18	Prime time	Daytime	Late night
2018–19	Prime time	Daytime	Late night
2019–20	Prime time	Daytime	Late night

== 2020s ==
2020–21	Prime time	Daytime		Late night	Overnight
2021–22	Prime time	Morning	Afternoon	Late night	Overnight
2022–23	Prime time	Morning	Daytime	Late night	Overnight
2023–24	Prime time	Morning	Daytime	Late night	Overnight
2024–25	Prime time	Morning	Daytime	Late night	Overnight
2025–26	Prime time	Morning	Daytime	Late night	Overnight
2026–27	Prime time	Morning	Daytime	Late night	Overnight
