= 1977–78 United States network television schedule (daytime) =

The following is the 1977–78 daytime network television schedule for the three major English-language commercial broadcast networks in the United States. It covers the weekday and weekend daytime hours from September 1977 to August 1978.

Talk shows are highlighted in yellow, local programming is white, reruns of older programming are orange, game shows are pink, soap operas are chartreuse, news programs are gold, children's programs are light purple and sports programs are light blue. New series are highlighted in bold.

PBS, the Public Broadcasting Service, was in operation, but the schedule was set by each local station.

== Schedule ==
=== Monday-Friday ===
Network		6:00 am	6:30 am	7:00 am	7:30 am	8:00 am	8:30 am	9:00 am	9:30 am	10:00 am	10:30 am	11:00 am	11:30 am	noon	12:30 pm	1:00 pm	1:30 pm	2:00 pm	2:30 pm	3:00 pm	3:15 pm	3:30 pm	4:00 pm	4:30 pm	5:00 pm	5:30 pm	6:00 pm	6:30 pm
ABC	Fall	Local/syndicated programming		Good Morning America				Local/syndicated programming				Happy Days reruns	Family Feud	The Better Sex	Ryan's Hope	All My Children		The $20,000 Pyramid	One Life to Live		General Hospital		The Edge of Night	Local/syndicated programming				ABC Evening News
ABC	Winter	Local/syndicated programming		Good Morning America				Local/syndicated programming				Happy Days reruns	Family Feud	The $20,000 Pyramid	Ryan's Hope	All My Children		One Life to Live		General Hospital			The Edge of Night	Local/syndicated programming				ABC Evening News
ABC	Summer	Local/syndicated programming		Good Morning America				Local/syndicated programming				Happy Days reruns	Family Feud	The $20,000 Pyramid	Ryan's Hope	All My Children		One Life to Live		General Hospital			The Edge of Night	Local/syndicated programming				**World News Tonight**
CBS	Fall	Sunrise Semester	Local/syndicated programming	CBS Morning News		Captain Kangaroo		Local/syndicated programming		Here's Lucy reruns	The Price Is Right		Love of Life; 11:55 am: CBS Midday News	The Young and the Restless	Search for Tomorrow	Local/syndicated programming	As the World Turns		Guiding Light	All in the Family reruns		Match Game '77	Tattletales	Local/syndicated programming				CBS Evening News
CBS	November	Sunrise Semester	Local/syndicated programming	CBS Morning News		Captain Kangaroo		Local/syndicated programming		The Price Is Right		Match Game '77	Love of Life; 11:55 am: CBS Midday News	The Young and the Restless	Search for Tomorrow	Local/syndicated programming	As the World Turns		Guiding Light			All in the Family reruns	Tattletales	Local/syndicated programming				CBS Evening News
CBS	Winter	Sunrise Semester	Local/syndicated programming	CBS Morning News		Captain Kangaroo		Local/syndicated programming		Tattletales	The Price Is Right		Love of Life; 11:55 am: CBS Midday News	The Young and the Restless	Search for Tomorrow	Local/syndicated programming	As the World Turns		Guiding Light			All in the Family reruns	Match Game '78	Local/syndicated programming				CBS Evening News
CBS	Spring	Sunrise Semester	Local/syndicated programming	CBS Morning News		Captain Kangaroo		Local/syndicated programming		**Pass the Buck**	The Price Is Right		Love of Life; 11:55 am: CBS Midday News	The Young and the Restless	Search for Tomorrow	Local/syndicated programming	As the World Turns		Guiding Light			All in the Family reruns	Match Game '78	Local/syndicated programming				CBS Evening News
CBS	Summer	Sunrise Semester	Local/syndicated programming	CBS Morning News		Captain Kangaroo		Local/syndicated programming		**The New Tic Tac Dough**	The Price Is Right		Love of Life; 11:55 am: CBS Midday News	The Young and the Restless	Search for Tomorrow	Local/syndicated programming	As the World Turns		Guiding Light			All in the Family reruns	Match Game '78	Local/syndicated programming				CBS Evening News
NBC	Fall	Local/syndicated programming		Today				Local/syndicated programming		Sanford and Son reruns	The Hollywood Squares; 10:57 am: NBC News Update	Wheel of Fortune	**Knockout**	**To Say the Least**	Chico and the Man reruns	Local/syndicated programming	Days of Our Lives		The Doctors	Another World			The Gong Show	Local/syndicated programming				NBC Nightly News
NBC	Winter	Local/syndicated programming		Today				Local/syndicated programming		Sanford and Son reruns	The Hollywood Squares; 10:57 am: NBC News Update	Wheel of Fortune	**Knockout**	**To Say the Least**	The Gong Show; 12:57 pm: NBC News Update	**For Richer, For Poorer**	Days of Our Lives		The Doctors	Another World			Local/syndicated programming					NBC Nightly News
NBC	Spring	Local/syndicated programming		Today				Local/syndicated programming		**Card Sharks**	The Hollywood Squares; 10:57 am: NBC News Update	**The New High Rollers**	Wheel of Fortune	Sanford and Son reruns	The Gong Show; 12:57 pm: NBC News Update	**For Richer, For Poorer**	Days of Our Lives		The Doctors	Another World			Local/syndicated programming					NBC Nightly News
NBC	Summer	Local/syndicated programming		Today				Local/syndicated programming		**Card Sharks**	The Hollywood Squares; 10:57 am: NBC News Update	**The New High Rollers**	Wheel of Fortune	**America Alive!** 12:57 pm: NBC News Update		**For Richer, For Poorer**	Days of Our Lives		The Doctors	Another World			Local/syndicated programming					NBC Nightly News

==== Notes ====
- Programs aired before 9:00AM aired at the same time in all time zones. CBS's Sunrise Semester was a half-hour program which aired at either 6:00 or 6:30 AM, depending on the station.
- Programs scheduled after 10:00 AM Eastern aired one hour earlier (starting at 9:00 AM) in the Central and Pacific time zones. Stations in the Mountain time zone that started their network schedule at 8:00 AM would follow the Central and Pacific pattern that year.
- Some network programs, particularly before 7:00 AM and after 10:00/9:00 AM, were subject to preemption by local affiliate stations in favor of syndicated or locally produced programs.
- On ABC, ABC Evening News / World News Tonight was produced at 6:00 PM Eastern/5:00 PM Central, and aired live by some affiliates. This early feed of the broadcast was discontinued in 1982.
- A CBS News Razzmatazz special would occasionally preempt CBS' 4:00PM show.

=== Saturday ===
Network		7:00 am	7:30 am	8:00 am	8:30 am	9:00 am	9:30 am	10:00 am	10:30 am	11:00 am	11:30 am	noon	12:30 pm	1:00 pm	1:30 pm	2:00 pm	2:30 pm	3:00 pm	3:30 pm	4:00 pm	4:30 pm	5:00 pm	5:30 pm	6:00 pm	6:30 pm
ABC		Local/syndicated programming		**The All-New Super Friends Hour** / Schoolhouse Rock! (8:56AM)		**Scooby's All-Star Laff-A-Lympics** / Schoolhouse Rock! (10:56AM)				The Krofft Supershow / Schoolhouse Rock! (11:56AM)		**ABC Weekend Special**	American Bandstand		ABC Sports and/or local/syndicated programming										
CBS	Fall	Local/syndicated programming		The Bugs Bunny/Road Runner Hour		**What's New, Mr. Magoo?**	**The Skatebirds**		**Space Academy**	**The Batman/Tarzan Adventure Hour**		**Wacko**	Fat Albert and the Cosby Kids (R)	The Secrets of Isis (R)	CBS Saturday Film Festival	CBS Sports and/or local/syndicated programming								CBS Evening News	Local/syndicated programming
CBS	November	Local/syndicated programming		The Skatebirds		The Bugs Bunny/Road Runner Show			The Batman/Tarzan Adventure Hour		Space Academy	The Secrets of Isis (R)	Fat Albert and the Cosby Kids (R)	What's New, Mr. Magoo?	CBS Saturday Film Festival	CBS Sports and/or local/syndicated programming								CBS Evening News	Local/syndicated programming
CBS	Spring	Local/syndicated programming		**The Robonic Stooges**	Speed Buggy (R)	The Bugs Bunny/Road Runner Show			The Batman/Tarzan Adventure Hour		The Secrets of Isis (R)	Fat Albert and the Cosby Kids (R)	Space Academy	What's New, Mr. Magoo?	CBS Saturday Film Festival	CBS Sports and/or local/syndicated programming								CBS Evening News	Local/syndicated programming
NBC	Fall	Local/syndicated programming	Think Pink Panther	**CB Bears**		**Young Sentinels**	**The New Archie and Sabrina Hour**		**I Am the Greatest: The Adventures of Muhammad Ali**	**Thunder**	**Search and Rescue: The Alpha Team**	**Baggy Pants and the Nitwits**	**The Red Hand Gang**	NBC Sports and/or local/syndicated programming										Local/syndicated programming	NBC Saturday Night News
NBC	October	Local/syndicated programming	Think Pink Panther	**CB Bears**		**Space Sentinels**	**The Bang-Shang Lollapalooza Show**	**Super Witch**	**I Am the Greatest: The Adventures of Muhammad Ali**	**Thunder**	**Search and Rescue: The Alpha Team**	**Baggy Pants and the Nitwits**	**The Red Hand Gang**	NBC Sports and/or local/syndicated programming										Local/syndicated programming	NBC Saturday Night News
NBC	Spring	Local/syndicated programming	I Am the Greatest: The Adventures of Muhammad Ali	Hong Kong Phooey (R)	**The Go-Go Globetrotters**				Space Sentinels	Think Pink Panther	Baggy Pants and the Nitwits	Land of the Lost (R)	Thunder	NBC Sports and/or local/syndicated programming										Local/syndicated programming	NBC Saturday Night News

In the News aired ten times during CBS' Saturday morning shows.

=== Sunday ===
Network		7:00 am	7:30 am	8:00 am	8:30 am	9:00 am	9:30 am	10:00 am	10:30 am	11:00 am	11:30 am	noon	12:30 pm	1:00 pm	1:30 pm	2:00 pm	2:30 pm	3:00 pm	3:30 pm	4:00 pm	4:30 pm	5:00 pm	5:30 pm	6:00 pm	6:30 pm
ABC		Local/syndicated programming							Jabberjaw (R)	The Great Grape Ape Show (R)	Animals, Animals, Animals	Issues and Answers		ABC Sports and/or local/syndicated programming											
CBS	Fall	Local/syndicated programming		Ark II (R)	The Ghost Busters (R)	Local/syndicated programming		Lamp Unto My Feet	Look Up and Live	Camera Three	Face The Nation	Local/syndicated programming	The NFL Today	NFL on CBS and/or local/syndicated programming										Local/syndicated programming	CBS Evening News
CBS	Winter	Local/syndicated programming		Ark II (R)	The Ghost Busters (R)	Local/syndicated programming		Lamp Unto My Feet	Look Up and Live	Camera Three	Face The Nation	CBS Sports and/or local/syndicated programming												Local/syndicated programming	CBS Evening News
NBC	Fall	Local/syndicated programming										Meet The Press	**NFL '77**	NFL on NBC and/or local/syndicated programming										Local/syndicated programming	NBC Sunday Night News
NBC	Winter	Local											Meet The Press	NBC Sports and/or local/syndicated programming/syndicated programming										Local/syndicated programming	NBC Sunday Night News

== By network ==
=== ABC ===
**Returning Series**

- The $20,000 Pyramid
- ABC Evening News
- All My Children
- American Bandstand
- Animals, Animals, Animals
- The Better Sex
- The Edge of Night
- Family Feud
- General Hospital
- Good Morning America
- The Great Grape Ape Show (reruns)
- Happy Days (reruns)
- Issues and Answers
- Jabberjaw (reruns)
- The Krofft Supershow
- One Life to Live
- Ryan's Hope
- Schoolhouse Rock!

**New Series**

- **ABC Weekend Special**
- **ABC World News Tonight**
- **The All-New Super Friends Hour**
- **Scooby's All-Star Laff-A-Lympics**

**Not Returning From 1976 to 1977**

- The Don Ho Show
- Hot Seat
- Junior Almost Anything Goes!
- The Mumbly Cartoon Show
- The New Adventures of Gilligan (reruns)
- The Oddball Couple (reruns)
- The Scooby-Doo/Dynomutt Hour
- Second Chance returned in 1983 on CBS as Press Your Luck
- Super Friends (reruns)
- The Tom and Jerry Show

=== CBS ===
**Returning Series**

- All in the Family (reruns)
- Ark II (reruns)
- As the World Turns
- The Bugs Bunny/Road Runner Hour
- Camera Three
- Captain Kangaroo
- CBS Children's Film Festival
- CBS Evening News
- CBS Morning News
- Face the Nation
- Fat Albert and the Cosby Kids (reruns)
- The Ghost Busters (reruns)
- Guiding Light
- Here's Lucy (reruns)
- Lamp Unto My Feet
- Look Up and Live
- Love of Life
- Match Game
- The New Adventures of Batman (reruns)
- The Price Is Right
- Search for Tomorrow
- The Secrets of Isis (reruns)
- Speed Buggy (reruns)
- Sunrise Semester
- Tarzan, Lord of the Jungle
- Tattletales
- The Young and the Restless

**New Series**

- **The Batman/Tarzan Adventure Hour**
- **The New Tic Tac Dough**
- **Pass the Buck**
- **The Robonic Stooges**
- **Space Academy**
- **The Skatebirds**
- **Wacko**
- **What's New, Mr. Magoo?**

**Not Returning From 1976 to 1977**

- Clue Club
- Double Dare
- Far Out Space Nuts (reruns)
- Gambit returned in 1980 on NBC as Las Vegas Gambit
- The Hudson Brothers Razzle Dazzle Show (reruns)
- Shazam!
- Way Out Games

=== NBC ===
**Returning Series**

- Another World
- Chico and the Man (reruns)
- Days of Our Lives
- The Doctors
- The Gong Show
- High Rollers
- The Hollywood Squares
- Hong Kong Phooey (reruns)
- Land of the Lost (reruns)
- Meet the Press
- NBC Nightly News
- NBC Saturday Night News
- NBC Sunday Night News
- Think Pink Panther
- Sanford and Son (reruns)
- Today
- Wheel of Fortune

**New Series**

- **I Am the Greatest: The Adventures of Muhammad Ali**
- **America Alive!**
- **Baggy Pants and the Nitwits**
- **Card Sharks**
- **CB Bears**
- **The Go-Go Globetrotters** (Combined reruns of Harlem Globetrotters with Space Ghost, The Herculoids and CB Bears)
- **For Richer, For Poorer**
- **Knockout**
- **The New Archie and Sabrina Hour**
- **The Red Hand Gang**
- **Search and Rescue: The Alpha Team**
- **Space Sentinels**
- **Thunder**
- **To Say the Least**

**Not Returning From 1976 to 1977**

- 50 Grand Slam
- Big John, Little John
- It's Anybody's Guess
- The Kids From C.A.P.E.R.
- Lovers and Friends
- McDuff, the Talking Dog
- Monster Squad
- Muggsy
- Name That Tune
- Shoot for the Stars
- Somerset
- Stumpers!

== See also ==
- 1977-78 United States network television schedule (prime-time)
- 1977-78 United States network television schedule (late night)

== Sources ==
- https://web.archive.org/web/20071015122215/http://curtalliaume.com/abc_day.html
- https://web.archive.org/web/20071015122235/http://curtalliaume.com/cbs_day.html
- https://web.archive.org/web/20071012211242/http://curtalliaume.com/nbc_day.html
