= 1972–73 United States network television schedule (daytime) =

The following is the 1972–73 daytime network television schedule for the three major English-language commercial broadcast networks in the United States. It covers the weekday and weekend daytime hours from September 1972 to August 1973. All times are Eastern and Pacific.

Talk shows are highlighted in yellow, local programming is white, reruns of older programming are orange, game shows are pink, soap operas are chartreuse, news programs are gold, children's shows are light purple and sports programs are light blue. New series are highlighted in bold.

== Monday-Friday ==
Network		6:00 am	6:30 am	7:00 am	7:30 am	8:00 am	8:30 am	9:00 am	9:30 am	10:00 am	10:30 am	11:00 am	11:30 am	noon	12:30 pm	1:00 pm	1:30 pm	2:00 pm	2:30 pm	3:00 pm	3:30 pm	4:00 pm	4:30 pm	5:00 pm	5:30 pm	6:00 pm	6:30 pm
ABC	Fall	Local/syndicated programming											Bewitched reruns	Password	Split Second	All My Children	Let's Make a Deal	The Newlywed Game	The Dating Game	General Hospital	One Life to Live	Love, American Style reruns	Local/syndicated programming				ABC News
ABC	Summer	Local/syndicated programming											**The Brady Bunch** reruns	Password	Split Second	All My Children	Let's Make a Deal	The Newlywed Game	**The Girl in My Life**	General Hospital	One Life to Live	Love, American Style reruns	Local/syndicated programming				ABC News
CBS	Fall	Sunrise Semester	Local/syndicated programming	CBS Morning News		Captain Kangaroo		Local/syndicated programming		**The Joker's Wild**	**The New Price Is Right**	**Gambit**	Love of Life; 11:55 am: CBS News (starting spring)	Where the Heart Is; 12:25 pm: CBS News (until spring)	Search for Tomorrow	Local/syndicated programming	As the World Turns	The Guiding Light	The Edge of Night	Love is a Many Splendored Thing	The Secret Storm	Family Affair reruns	Local/syndicated programming				CBS Evening News
CBS	Winter	Sunrise Semester	Local/syndicated programming	CBS Morning News		Captain Kangaroo		Local/syndicated programming		**The Joker's Wild**	**The New Price Is Right**	**Gambit**	Love of Life; 11:55 am: CBS News (starting spring)	Where the Heart Is; 12:25 pm: CBS News (until spring)	Search for Tomorrow	Local/syndicated programming	As the World Turns	The Guiding Light	The Edge of Night	Love is a Many Splendored Thing	The Secret Storm	**The Vin Scully Show**	Local/syndicated programming				CBS Evening News
CBS	Spring	Sunrise Semester	Local/syndicated programming	CBS Morning News		Captain Kangaroo		Local/syndicated programming		**The Joker's Wild**	**The $10,000 Pyramid**	**Gambit**	Love of Life; 11:55 am: CBS News (starting spring)	**The Young and the Restless**	Search for Tomorrow	Local/syndicated programming	As the World Turns	The Guiding Light	The Edge of Night	The (New) Price Is Right	**Hollywood's Talking**	The Secret Storm	Local/syndicated programming				CBS Evening News
CBS	Summer	Sunrise Semester	Local/syndicated programming	CBS Morning News		Captain Kangaroo		Local/syndicated programming		**The Joker's Wild**	**The $10,000 Pyramid**	**Gambit**	Love of Life; 11:55 am: CBS News (starting spring)	**The Young and the Restless**	Search for Tomorrow	Local/syndicated programming	As the World Turns	The Guiding Light	The Edge of Night	The (New) Price Is Right	**Match Game '73**	The Secret Storm	Local/syndicated programming				CBS Evening News
NBC	Fall	Local/syndicated programming		The Today Show				Local/syndicated programming		Dinah's Place	Concentration	Sale of the Century	The Hollywood Squares	Jeopardy!	The Who, What, or Where Game; 12:55 pm: NBC News	Local/syndicated programming	Three on a Match	Days of Our Lives	The Doctors	Another World	Return to Peyton Place	Somerset	Local/syndicated programming				NBC Nightly News
NBC	Spring	Local/syndicated programming		The Today Show				Local/syndicated programming		Dinah's Place	**Baffle**	Sale of the Century	The Hollywood Squares	Jeopardy!	The Who, What, or Where Game; 12:55 pm: NBC News	Local/syndicated programming	Three on a Match	Days of Our Lives	The Doctors	Another World	Return to Peyton Place	Somerset	Local/syndicated programming				NBC Nightly News
NBC	Summer	Local/syndicated programming		The Today Show				Local/syndicated programming		Dinah's Place	**Baffle**	**The Wizard of Odds**	The Hollywood Squares	Jeopardy!	The Who, What, or Where Game; 12:55 pm: NBC News	Local/syndicated programming	Three on a Match	Days of Our Lives	The Doctors	Another World	Return to Peyton Place	Somerset	Local/syndicated programming				NBC Nightly News

- ABC had a 6PM (ET)/5PM (CT) feed for their newscast

== Saturday ==
Network		7:00 am	7:30 am	8:00 am	8:30 am	9:00 am	9:30 am	10:00 am	10:30 am	11:00 am	11:30 am	noon	12:30 pm	1:00 pm	1:30 pm	2:00 pm	2:30 pm	3:00 pm	3:30 pm	4:00 pm	4:30 pm	5:00 pm	5:30 pm	6:00 pm	6:30 pm
ABC		Local/syndicated programming		H.R. Pufnstuf (R)	The Jackson 5ive	**The Osmonds**	**The ABC Saturday Superstar Movie**		**The Brady Kids**	Bewitched (R)	**Kid Power**	The Funky Phantom (R)	Lidsville (R)	The Monkees (R)	American Bandstand		ABC Sports and/or local/syndicated programming								
CBS		Local/syndicated programming		The Bugs Bunny Show (R)	Sabrina the Teenage Witch (R)	**The Amazing Chan and the Chan Clan**	**The New Scooby-Doo Movies**		**Josie and the Pussycats in Outer Space**	**The Flintstone Comedy Hour**		Archie's TV Funnies (R)	**Fat Albert and the Cosby Kids**	CBS Children's Film Festival		CBS Sports and/or local/syndicated programming								CBS Evening News	Local/syndicated programming
NBC	Fall	Local/syndicated programming		The Underdog Show (R)	The Jetsons (R)	The New Pink Panther Show	**The Houndcats**	**The Roman Holidays**	**The Barkleys**	**Sealab 2020**	**Runaround**	**Around the World in 80 Days**	**Talking with a Giant**	NBC Sports and/or local/syndicated programming										Local/syndicated programming	NBC Saturday Night News
NBC	Winter	Local/syndicated programming		The Houndcats	The Roman Holidays	The Jetsons (R)	The New Pink Panther Show	The Underdog Show (R)	**The Barkleys**	**Sealab 2020**	**Runaround**	**Around the World in 80 Days**	**Talking with a Giant**	NBC Sports and/or local/syndicated programming										Local/syndicated programming	NBC Saturday Night News

In the News aired after all of CBS's Saturday morning shows, except Fat Albert and the Cosby Kids and CBS Children's Film Festival.

On January 6, ABC debuted Multiplication Rock, a series of three-minute animated educational shorts shown five times each Saturday between programs.

== Sunday ==
Network		7:00 am	7:30 am	8:00 am	8:30 am	9:00 am	9:30 am	10:00 am	10:30 am	11:00 am	11:30 am	noon	12:30 pm	1:00 pm	1:30 pm	2:00 pm	2:30 pm	3:00 pm	3:30 pm	4:00 pm	4:30 pm	5:00 pm	5:30 pm	6:00 pm	6:30 pm
ABC		Local/syndicated programming						Curiosity Shop (R)		The Bullwinkle Show (R)	Make a Wish	Local/syndicated programming			Issues and Answers	ABC Sports and/or local/syndicated programming									
CBS	Fall	Local/syndicated programming				Archie's Funhouse (R)	Harlem Globetrotters (R)	Lamp Unto My Feet	Look Up and Live	Camera Three	Face the Nation	NFL on CBS and/or local/syndicated programming													
CBS	Winter	Local/syndicated programming				Archie's Funhouse (R)	Harlem Globetrotters (R)	Lamp Unto My Feet	Look Up and Live	Camera Three	Face the Nation	CBS Sports and/or local/syndicated programming												60 Minutes	
CBS	Summer	Local/syndicated programming				Archie's Funhouse (R)	Harlem Globetrotters (R)	Lamp Unto My Feet	Look Up and Live	Camera Three	Face the Nation	CBS Sports and/or local/syndicated programming												Local/syndicated programming	CBS Evening News
NBC	Fall	Local/syndicated programming											Meet the Press	NBC Sports and/or local/syndicated programming										Local/syndicated programming	NBC Sunday Night News
NBC	Spring	Local/syndicated programming												Meet the Press	NBC Sports and/or local/syndicated programming									Local/syndicated programming	NBC Sunday Night News

Multiplication Rock followed Curiosity Shop and Make a Wish on ABC starting January 7.

== By network ==
=== ABC ===
**Returning series**

- ABC Evening News
- All My Children
- American Bandstand
- Bewitched (reruns)
- The Bullwinkle Show (reruns)
- Curiosity Shop (reruns)
- The Dating Game
- The Funky Phantom (reruns)
- General Hospital
- H.R. Pufnstuf (reruns)
- Issues and Answers
- The Jackson 5ive
- Let's Make a Deal
- Lidsville
- Love, American Style (reruns)
- Make a Wish
- The Monkees (reruns)
- The Newlywed Game
- One Life to Live
- Password
- Split Second

**New series**

- **The ABC Saturday Superstar Movie**
- **The Brady Bunch** (reruns)
- **The Brady Kids**
- **The Girl in My Life**
- **Kid Power**
- **Multiplication Rock**
- **The Osmonds**

**Not returning from 1971-72**

- Here Come the Double Deckers (reruns)
- Jonny Quest (reruns)
- Lancelot Link, Secret Chimp (reruns)
- The Reluctant Dragon & Mr. Toad Show (reruns)
- The Road Runner Show
- That Girl (reruns)
- Will the Real Jerry Lewis Please Sit Down (reruns)

=== CBS ===
**Returning series**

- Archie's Funhouse (reruns)
- Archie's TV Funnies
- As the World Turns
- The Bugs Bunny Show
- Camera Three
- Captain Kangaroo
- CBS Children's Film Festival
- CBS Evening News
- CBS Morning News
- The Edge of Night
- Face the Nation
- Family Affair (reruns)
- The Guiding Light
- Harlem Globetrotters (reruns)
- Lamp Unto My Feet
- Look Up and Live
- Love is a Many Splendored Thing
- Love of Life
- Match Game previously on NBC from 1962-69
- Sabrina the Teenage Witch (reruns)
- Search for Tomorrow
- The Secret Storm
- Sunrise Semester
- Where the Heart Is

**New series**

- **The $10,000 Pyramid**
- **The Amazing Chan and the Chan Clan**
- **Fat Albert and the Cosby Kids**
- **The Flintstone Comedy Hour**
- **Gambit**
- **Hollywood's Talking**
- **The Joker's Wild**
- **Josie and the Pussycats in Outer Space**
- **The New Scooby-Doo Movies**
- **The Price Is Right**
- **The Vin Scully Show**
- **The Young and the Restless**

**Not returning from 1971-72**

- The Amateur's Guide to Love
- The Beverly Hillbillies (reruns)
- Gomer Pyle, USMC (reruns)
- Groovie Goolies (reruns)
- Help!... It's the Hair Bear Bunch!
- The Lucy Show (reruns)
- The Monkees
- My Three Sons (reruns)
- The Pebbles and Bamm-Bamm Show
- Tom and Jerry (reruns; returned in 1975 on ABC)
- You Are There

=== NBC ===
**Returning series**

- Another World
- Concentration
- Days of Our Lives
- Dinah's Place
- The Doctors
- The Hollywood Squares
- Jeopardy!
- The Jetsons (reruns)
- Meet the Press
- NBC Nightly News
- NBC Saturday Night News
- NBC Sunday Night News
- The New Pink Panther Show
- Return to Peyton Place
- Sale of the Century
- Somerset
- Three on a Match
- Today
- The Underdog Show (reruns)
- The Who, What, or Where Game

**New series**

- **Around the World in 80 Days**
- **Baffle**
- **The Barkleys**
- **The Houndcats**
- **The Roman Holidays**
- **Runaround**
- **Sealab 2020**
- **Talking with a Giant**
- **The Wizard of Odds**

**Not returning from 1971-72**

- Barrier Reef
- Bright Promise
- The Bugaloos
- Deputy Dawg
- Doctor Dolittle (reruns)
- Take a Giant Step
- Mr. Wizard
- The Woody Woodpecker Show

== See also ==
- 1972-73 United States network television schedule (prime-time)
- 1972-73 United States network television schedule (late night)
