= 1958–59 United States network television schedule (daytime) =

The following is the daytime Monday–Friday schedule for the USA for all three networks for each calendar season beginning September 1958. All times are Eastern and Pacific. The 1958–1959 season, beginning October 13 for ABC, was its first "full scale daytime programming" schedule.

Talk shows are highlighted in yellow, local programming is white, reruns of prime-time programming are orange, game shows are pink, soap operas are chartreuse, news programs are gold and all others are light blue. New series are highlighted in bold.

== Monday-Friday ==
Network		6:00 am	6:30 am	7:00 am	7:30 am	8:00 am	8:30 am	9:00 am	9:30 am	10:00 am	10:30 am	11:00 am	11:30 am	noon	12:30 pm	1:00 pm	1:30 pm	2:00 pm	2:30 pm	3:00 pm	3:30 pm	4:00 pm	4:30 pm	5:00 pm	5:30 pm
ABC	Fall	local programming										**Day in Court**	**The Peter Lind Hayes Show**		**Mother's Day**	**The Liberace Show**	local programming	**Chance for Romance**	local programming	Beat the Clock	Who Do You Trust?*	American Bandstand			Mickey Mouse Club/**Walt Disney's Adventure Time** (Tue/Thu) repeats
ABC	Winter	local programming											**The Peter Lind Hayes Show**		Play Your Hunch	**The Liberace Show**	local programming	Day in Court	local programming	Beat the Clock	Who Do You Trust?*	American Bandstand			Mickey Mouse Club/**Walt Disney's Adventure Time** (Tue/Thu) repeats
ABC	Spring	local programming											**The Gale Storm Show** reruns	**Love That Bob** reruns	Pantomime Quiz	**Music Bingo**	local programming	Day in Court	local programming	Beat the Clock	Who Do You Trust?*	American Bandstand			Mickey Mouse Club/**Walt Disney's Adventure Time** (Tue/Thu) repeats
CBS	Fall	**Sunrise Semester**				Captain Kangaroo		local programming		For Love or Money	Play Your Hunch	Arthur Godfrey Time	Top Dollar	Love of Life	12:30 pm: Search for Tomorrow 12:45 pm: The Guiding Light	local programming	As the World Turns	The Jimmy Dean Show	Art Linkletter's House Party	The Big Payoff	The Verdict is Yours	4:00 pm: The Brighter Day 4:15 pm: The Secret Storm	The Edge of Night	local programming	
CBS	Winter	**Sunrise Semester**				Captain Kangaroo		local programming		For Love or Money	Arthur Godfrey Time	**I Love Lucy** reruns	Top Dollar	Love of Life	12:30 pm: Search for Tomorrow 12:45 pm: The Guiding Light	local programming	As the World Turns	The Jimmy Dean Show	Art Linkletter's House Party	The Big Payoff	The Verdict is Yours	4:00 pm: The Brighter Day 4:15 pm: The Secret Storm	The Edge of Night	local programming	
CBS	Spring	**Sunrise Semester**				Captain Kangaroo		local programming		**On the Go**	**The Sam Levenson Show**	**I Love Lucy** reruns	Top Dollar	Love of Life	12:30 pm: Search for Tomorrow 12:45 pm: The Guiding Light	local programming	As the World Turns	The Jimmy Dean Show	Art Linkletter's House Party	The Big Payoff	The Verdict is Yours	4:00 pm: The Brighter Day 4:15 pm: The Secret Storm	The Edge of Night	local programming	
CBS	Summer	**Sunrise Semester**				Captain Kangaroo		local programming		**On the Go**	**The Sam Levenson Show**	**I Love Lucy** reruns	Top Dollar	Love of Life	12:30 pm: Search for Tomorrow 12:45 pm: The Guiding Light	local programming	As the World Turns	**For Better or Worse**	Art Linkletter's House Party	**The Millionaire** reruns	The Verdict is Yours	4:00 pm: The Brighter Day 4:15 pm: The Secret Storm	The Edge of Night	local programming	
NBC	Fall	**Continental Classroom**		The Today Show				local programming		Dough Re Mi	Treasure Hunt	The Price Is Right	Concentration	Tic-Tac-Dough	12:30 pm: It Could Be You In COLOR 12:55 pm: NBC News Update	local programming		Truth or Consequences (In COLOR starting 10/27)	Haggis Baggis In COLOR	Today Is Ours	From These Roots	Queen for a Day	**County Fair**	local programming	
NBC	Winter	**Continental Classroom**		The Today Show				local programming		Dough Re Mi	Treasure Hunt	The Price Is Right	Concentration	Tic-Tac-Dough	12:30 pm: It Could Be You In COLOR 12:55 pm: NBC News Update	local programming		Truth or Consequences (In COLOR starting 10/27)	Haggis Baggis In COLOR	**Young Doctor Malone**	From These Roots	Queen for a Day	**County Fair**	local programming	
NBC	Spring	**Continental Classroom**		The Today Show				local programming		Dough Re Mi	Treasure Hunt	The Price Is Right	Concentration	Tic-Tac-Dough	12:30 pm: It Could Be You In COLOR 12:55 pm: NBC News Update	local programming		Queen for a Day	**The Court of Human Relations**	**Young Doctor Malone**	From These Roots	Truth or Consequences In COLOR	**County Fair**	local programming	

- formerly Do You Trust Your Wife?

== Saturday ==
Network		7:00 am	7:30 am	8:00 am	8:30 am	9:00 am	9:30 am	10:00 am	10:30 am	11:00 am	11:30 am	noon	12:30 pm	1:00 pm	1:30 pm	2:00 pm	2:30 pm	3:00 pm	3:30 pm	4:00 pm	4:30 pm	5:00 pm	5:30 pm
CBS	Fall	local programming					Captain Kangaroo		Mighty Mouse Playhouse	The Heckle and Jeckle Cartoon Show	The Adventures of Robin Hood	local programming											
CBS	Spring	local programming					Captain Kangaroo		Mighty Mouse Playhouse	The Heckle and Jeckle Cartoon Show	The Adventures of Robin Hood	local programming		CBS Saturday News	local programming								
NBC	Fall	local programming						Howdy Doody In COLOR	The Ruff and Reddy Show (In COLOR beginning in June)	Fury	Blondie (R)	True Story	Detective's Diary	local programming									
NBC	November	local programming						Howdy Doody In COLOR	The Ruff and Reddy Show (In COLOR beginning in June)	Fury	Circus Boy (R)	True Story	Detective's Diary	local programming									

== Sunday ==
Network		7:00 am	7:30 am	8:00 am	8:30 am	9:00 am	9:30 am	10:00 am	10:30 am	11:00 am	11:30 am	noon	12:30 pm	1:00 pm	1:30 pm	2:00 pm	2:30 pm	3:00 pm	3:30 pm	4:00 pm	4:30 pm	5:00 pm	5:30 pm	6:00 pm	6:30 pm
ABC	Fall	local programming												College News Conference	local programming							The Paul Winchell and Jerry Mahoney Show	local programming		
ABC	Winter	local programming												College News Conference	local programming			Open Hearing	local programming			The Paul Winchell and Jerry Mahoney Show	local programming		
ABC	Summer	local programming												College News Conference	local programming			Open Hearing	local programming						
CBS	Fall	local programming						Lamp Unto My Feet	Look Up and Live	UN in Action	Camera Three	NFL on CBS and/or local programming										The Great Game of Politics	Face the Nation	The Search	Air Power (R)
CBS	November	local programming						Lamp Unto My Feet	Look Up and Live	UN in Action	Camera Three	local programming	Face the Nation	NFL on CBS and/or local programming								The Great Game of Politics	Ted Mack's Amateur Hour	Small World	The Twentieth Century
CBS	Winter	local programming						Lamp Unto My Feet	Look Up and Live	Eye on New York	Camera Three	CBS Sports and/or local programming						The Last Word	**The World of Ideas**	Face the Nation	**Behind the News**	**College Bowl**	Ted Mack's Amateur Hour	Small World	The Twentieth Century
CBS	late Winter	local programming						Lamp Unto My Feet	Look Up and Live	Eye on New York	Camera Three	The Last Word	CBS Sports and/or local programming				**The Great Challenge**		**The World of Ideas**	Face the Nation	**Behind the News**	**College Bowl**	Ted Mack's Amateur Hour	Small World	The Twentieth Century
CBS	Spring	local programming						Lamp Unto My Feet	Look Up and Live	Eye on New York	Camera Three	The Last Word	CBS Sports and/or local programming							Young Audiences	First Meeting	Face the Nation	College Bowl	Behind the News	The Twentieth Century
CBS	Summer	local programming						Lamp Unto My Feet	Look Up and Live	Eye on New York	Camera Three	CBS Sports and/or local programming								Young Audiences	First Meeting	The Last Word	Face the Nation	Conquest	The Twentieth Century
NBC	Fall	local programming									Report from America	**They Speak for Themselves**	Youth Forum	Watch Mr. Wizard	Catholic Hour	Open Mind	NBC Sports and/or local programming					Omnibus / **Kaleidoscope**		Meet the Press	Outlook
NBC	mid-Fall	local programming									**For the People**	**They Speak for Themselves**	Youth Forum	Watch Mr. Wizard	Frontiers of Faith	Open Mind	NBC Sports and/or local programming					Omnibus / **Kaleidoscope**		Meet the Press	**Chet Huntley Reporting**
NBC	January	local programming									**Adventuring in the Hand Arts**	**They Speak for Themselves**	Youth Forum	Open Mind	Frontiers of Faith	NBC Sports and/or local programming						Omnibus / **Kaleidoscope**		Meet the Press	**Chet Huntley Reporting**
NBC	Spring	local programming									Watch Mr. Wizard	**They Speak for Themselves**	Youth Forum	Open Mind	Frontiers of Faith	Wisdom	NBC Sports and/or local programming					Omnibus / **Kaleidoscope**		Meet the Press	**Chet Huntley Reporting**
NBC	Summer	local programming									Watch Mr. Wizard	**They Speak for Themselves**	local programming	Open Mind	NBC Sports and/or local programming								Frontiers of Faith	Meet the Press	**Chet Huntley Reporting**
NBC	August	local programming									Watch Mr. Wizard	**They Speak for Themselves**	local programming	Open Mind	NBC Sports and/or local programming								Catholic Hour	Meet the Press	**Chet Huntley Reporting**

== By network ==
=== ABC ===
**Returning Series**

- American Bandstand
- Beat the Clock
- College News Conference
- The Mickey Mouse Club
- Open Hearing
- Pantomime Quiz
- The Paul Winchell and Jerry Mahoney Show
- Play Your Hunch
- Who Do You Trust?

**New Series**

- **Chance for Romance**
- **Day in Court**
- **The Gale Storm Show** (reruns)
- **The Liberace Show**
- **Love That Bob** (reruns)
- **Mother's Day**
- **Music Bingo**
- **The Peter Lind Hayes Show**
- **Walt Disney's Adventure Time**

**Not Returning From 1957 to 1958**

- The Adventures of Sir Lancelot
- The Adventures of Superman
- The Adventures of Wild Bill Hickok
- The Buccaneers
- Dean Pike
- Get Set, Go
- The Woody Woodpecker Show

=== CBS ===
**Returning Series**

- The Adventures of Robin Hood
- Air Power
- Art Linkletter's House Party
- Arthur Godfrey Time
- As the World Turns
- The Big Payoff
- The Brighter Day
- Camera Three
- Captain Kangaroo
- CBS Saturday News
- The Edge of Night
- Eye on New York
- Face the Nation
- For Love or Money
- The Guiding Light
- The Heckle and Jeckle Cartoon Show
- The Jimmy Dean Show
- Lamp Unto My Feet
- The Last Word
- Look Up and Live
- Love of Life
- Mighty Mouse Playhouse
- NFL on CBS
- Play Your Hunch
- The Search
- Search for Tomorrow
- The Secret Storm
- Ted Mack's Amateur Hour
- Top Dollar
- The Twentieth Century
- The Verdict is Yours
- UN in Action

**New Series**

- **Behind the News**
- **College Bowl**
- **Conquest**
- **For Better or Worse**
- **First Meeting**
- **The Great Challenge**
- **The Great Game of Politics**
- **I Love Lucy** (reruns)
- **The Millionaire** (reruns)
- **On the Go**
- **The Sam Levinson Show**
- **Small World**
- **Sunrise Semester**
- **The World of Ideas**
- **Young Audiences**

**Not Returning From 1957 to 1958**

- The Adventures of Wild Bill Hickok
- CBS World News Roundup
- Charles Collingwood with the News
- Dotto
- The Garry Moore Show
- Hotel Cosmopolitan
- How Do You Rate?
- Let's Take a Trip
- Our Miss Brooks (reruns)
- Saturday Playhouse
- See It Now
- Strike It Rich
- Susan's Show
- Walter Cronkite and the News
- You Are There

=== NBC ===
**Returning Series**

- Blondie (reruns)
- Catholic Hour
- Circus Boy (reruns)
- Concentration
- Detective's Diary
- Dough Re Mi
- From These Roots
- Frontiers of Faith
- Fury
- Haggis Baggis
- Howdy Doody
- It Could Be You
- Meet the Press
- Omnibus
- Outlook
- The Price Is Right
- Queen for a Day
- The Ruff and Reddy Show
- Tic-Tac-Dough
- The Today Show
- Today Is Ours
- Treasure Hunt
- True Story
- Truth or Consequences
- Watch Mr. Wizard
- Wisdom

**New Series**

- **Adventuring in the Hand Arts**
- **Chet Huntley Reporting**
- **Continental Classroom**
- **County Fair**
- **The Court of Human Relations**
- **For the People**
- **Kaleidoscope**
- **Open Mind**
- **Report from America**
- **They Speak for Themselves**
- **Young Doctor Malone**
- **Youth Forum**

**Not Returning From 1957 to 1958**

- Andy's Gang
- Arlene Francis Show
- Bride and Gloom
- Captain Gallant of the Foreign Legion
- Close-Up
- Club-60
- Comedy Time
- Comment
- The Gumby Show
- Kitty Foyle
- Look Here
- Lucky Partners
- Matinee Theater
- Modern Romances
- My Friend Flicka
- Wide Wide World
- Youth Wants to Know

== See also ==
- 1958-59 United States network television schedule (prime-time)
- 1958-59 United States network television schedule (late night)

== Sources ==
- https://web.archive.org/web/20071015122215/http://curtalliaume.com/abc_day.html
- https://web.archive.org/web/20071015122235/http://curtalliaume.com/cbs_day.html
- https://web.archive.org/web/20071012211242/http://curtalliaume.com/nbc_day.html
- Castleman & Podrazik, The TV Schedule Book, McGraw-Hill Paperbacks, 1984
- Hyatt, The Encyclopedia Of Daytime Television, Billboard Books, 1997
- TV schedules, New York Times, September 1958 – September 1959 (microfilm)
