= 1960–61 United States network television schedule (daytime) =

The following is the 1960–61 daytime network television schedule for the three major English-language commercial broadcast networks in the United States. It covers the weekday daytime hours from September 1960 to August 1961.

Talk shows are highlighted in yellow, local programming is white, reruns of prime-time programming are orange, game shows are pink, soap operas are chartreuse, news programs are gold and all others are light blue. New series are highlighted in bold.

== Monday-Friday ==
Network		6:00 am	6:30 am	7:00 am	7:30 am	8:00 am	8:30 am	9:00 am	9:30 am	10:00 am	10:30 am	11:00 am	11:30 am	noon	12:30 pm	1:00 pm	1:30 pm	2:00 pm	2:30 pm	3:00 pm	3:30 pm	4:00 pm	4:30 pm	5:00 pm	5:30 pm	6:00 pm	6:30 pm
ABC	Fall	local programming											The Gale Storm Show (R)	Love That Bob (R)	Beat the Clock	About Faces	The Texan (R)	Day in Court	**The Road to Reality**	Queen for a Day	Who Do You Trust?	American Bandstand			Captain Gallant (Mon) (R) The Adventures of Rin Tin Tin (Tue/Fri) (R) **The Lone Ranger** (Wed) (R) Rocky and His Friends (Thu)	John Daly with the News 6:15: local programming	local programming
ABC	Winter	local programming											Love That Bob (R)	**Camouflage**	**Number Please**	The Gale Storm Show (R)	The Texan (R)	Day in Court	**The Road to Reality**	Queen for a Day	Who Do You Trust?	American Bandstand			Captain Gallant (Mon) (R) Rocky and His Friends (Tue/Thu) The Lone Ranger (Wed) (R) The Adventures of Rin Tin Tin (Fri) (R)	ABC Evening Report 6:15: local programming	local programming
ABC	Spring	local programming											Love That Bob (R)	**Camouflage**	**Number Please**	The Gale Storm Show (R)	The Texan (R)	Day in Court	**Seven Keys**	Queen for a Day	Who Do You Trust?	American Bandstand			The Adventures of Rin Tin Tin (Mon/Fri) reruns Rocky and His Friends (Tue/Thu) The Lone Ranger (Wed) reruns	ABC Evening Report 6:15: local programming	local programming
CBS	Fall	Sunrise Semester				Captain Kangaroo		local programming		I Love Lucy (R)	Video Village	December Bride (R)	The Clear Horizon	Love of Life	12:30 pm: Search for Tomorrow 12:45 pm: The Guiding Light	local programming	As the World Turns	Full Circle	Art Linkletter's House Party	The Millionaire (R)	The Verdict is Yours	4:00 pm: The Brighter Day 4:15 pm: The Secret Storm	The Edge of Night	local programming			
CBS	Spring	Sunrise Semester				Captain Kangaroo		local programming		I Love Lucy (R)	Video Village	**Double Exposure**	**Your Surprise Package**	Love of Life	12:30 pm: Search for Tomorrow 12:45 pm: The Guiding Light	local programming	As the World Turns	**Face the Facts**	Art Linkletter's House Party	The Millionaire (R)	The Verdict is Yours	4:00 pm: The Brighter Day 4:15 pm: The Secret Storm	The Edge of Night	local programming			
NBC	Fall	Continental Classroom		The Today Show				local programming		Dough Re Mi	Play Your Hunch In COLOR	The Price Is Right In COLOR	Concentration	Truth or Consequences	12:30 pm: It Could Be You In COLOR 12:55 pm: NBC News Update	local programming	**Make Room for Daddy** (R)	**The Jan Murray Show: Charge Account** In COLOR	local programming	Young Dr. Malone	From These Roots	The Loretta Young Theater (R)	**Here's Hollywood**	local programming			
NBC	Winter	Continental Classroom		The Today Show				local programming		**Say When!!**	Play Your Hunch In COLOR	The Price Is Right In COLOR	Concentration	Truth or Consequences	12:30 pm: It Could Be You In COLOR 12:55 pm: NBC News Update	local programming	**Make Room for Daddy** (R)	**The Jan Murray Show: Charge Account** In COLOR	local programming	Young Dr. Malone	From These Roots	The Loretta Young Theater (R)	**Here's Hollywood**	local programming			

== Saturday ==
Network		7:00 am	7:30 am	8:00 am	8:30 am	9:00 am	9:30 am	10:00 am	10:30 am	11:00 am	11:30 am	noon	12:30 pm	1:00 pm	1:30 pm	2:00 pm	2:30 pm	3:00 pm	3:30 pm	4:00 pm	4:30 pm	5:00 pm	5:30 pm	6:00 pm	6:30 pm
ABC	Fall	local programming										Lunch with Soupy Sales	local programming												
ABC	Spring	local programming																							
CBS	Fall	local programming	Sunrise Semester	local programming				Captain Kangaroo		**The Magic Land of Allakazam**	Mighty Mouse Playhouse	Sky King (R)	CBS Saturday News	local programming											
CBS	Winter	local programming		Sunrise Semester	local programming			Captain Kangaroo		**The Magic Land of Allakazam**	The Roy Rogers Show (R)	Sky King (R)	Mighty Mouse Playhouse	CBS Saturday News	local programming										
CBS	Spring	local programming		Sunrise Semester	local programming		Captain Kangaroo		Mighty Mouse Playhouse	**The Magic Land of Allakazam**	The Roy Rogers Show (R)	Sky King (R)	CBS Saturday News	local programming											
CBS	Summer	local programming					Captain Kangaroo		Mighty Mouse Playhouse	**The Magic Land of Allakazam**	The Roy Rogers Show (R)	Sky King (R)	CBS Saturday News	local programming											
NBC	Fall	local programming						**The Shari Lewis Show**	**King Leonardo and His Short Subjects**	Fury (R)	The Lone Ranger (R)	True Story	Detective's Diary (R)	Watch Mr. Wizard	local programming										
NBC	Summer	local programming					**Pip the Piper**	**The Shari Lewis Show**	**King Leonardo and His Short Subjects**	Fury (R)	The Lone Ranger (R)	True Story	Detective's Diary (R)	Watch Mr. Wizard	local programming										

== Sunday ==
Network		7:00 am	7:30 am	8:00 am	8:30 am	9:00 am	9:30 am	10:00 am	10:30 am	11:00 am	11:30 am	noon	12:30 pm	1:00 pm	1:30 pm	2:00 pm	2:30 pm	3:00 pm	3:30 pm	4:00 pm	4:30 pm	5:00 pm	5:30 pm	6:00 pm	6:30 pm
ABC	Fall	local programming													College News Conference	local programming						Matty's Funday Funnies	local programming		Walt Disney Presents
ABC	November	local programming													**Issues and Answers**	local programming						Matty's Funday Funnies	local programming		Walt Disney Presents
ABC	Winter	local programming										**Pip the Piper**	local programming		**Issues and Answers**	local programming					The Paul Winchell and Jerry Mahoney Show	Matty's Funday Funnies	local programming		Walt Disney Presents
ABC	Spring	local programming										**Pip the Piper**	local programming								Issues and Answers	Matty's Funday Funnies	local programming		Walt Disney Presents
ABC	Summer	local programming																			Issues and Answers	Matty's Funday Funnies	local programming		Walt Disney Presents
CBS	Fall	local programming						Lamp Unto My Feet	Look Up and Live	UN in Action	Camera Three	Television Workshop		CBS Sports and/or local programming								**Ted Mack's Amateur Hour**	College Bowl	Face the Nation	The Twentieth Century (R)
CBS	Winter	local programming						Lamp Unto My Feet	Look Up and Live	Eye on New York	Camera Three	CBS Sports and/or local programming										**Ted Mack's Amateur Hour**	College Bowl	I Love Lucy (R)	The Twentieth Century (R)
CBS	Spring	local programming						Lamp Unto My Feet	Look Up and Live	Eye on New York	Camera Three	**Washington Conversation**	CBS Sports and/or local programming									**Ted Mack's Amateur Hour**	College Bowl	I Love Lucy (R)	The Twentieth Century (R)
CBS	Summer	local programming						Lamp Unto My Feet	Look Up and Live	Eye on New York	Camera Three	CBS Sports and/or local programming										Accent	Ted Mack's Amateur Hour	I Love Lucy (R)	The Twentieth Century (R)
NBC	Fall	local programming											Youth Forum	local programming	Frontiers of Faith / Eternal Light / Catholic Hour	NBC Sports and/or local programming				Open Mind		Celebrity Golf	Chet Huntley Reporting	Meet the Press	People are Funny (R)
NBC	Winter	local programming											Youth Forum	local programming	Frontiers of Faith / Eternal Light / Catholic Hour	Open Mind	NBC Sports and/or local programming					Celebrity Golf	Chet Huntley Reporting	Meet the Press	People are Funny (R)
NBC	Spring	local programming											Youth Forum	local programming	Frontiers of Faith / Eternal Light / Catholic Hour	NBC Sports and/or local programming				Open Mind		Celebrity Golf	Chet Huntley Reporting	Meet the Press	Specials
NBC	Summer	local programming											Youth Forum	local programming	Frontiers of Faith / Eternal Light / Catholic Hour	NBC Sports and/or local programming				Open Mind		local programming	Edwin Newman Reporting	Meet the Press	Specials

== By network ==
=== ABC ===
**Returning Series**

- About Faces
- The Adventures of Rin-Tin-Tin (reruns)
- American Bandstand
- Beat the Clock
- Captain Gallant of the Foreign Legion (reruns)
- College News Conference
- Day in Court
- The Gale Storm Show (reruns)
- Love That Bob (reruns)
- Lunch with Soupy Sales
- Matty's Funday Funnies
- The Paul Winchell and Jerry Mahoney Show
- Queen for a Day (moved from NBC)
- Rocky and His Friends
- The Texan (reruns)
- Who Do You Trust?

**New Series**

- **Camouflage**
- **Issues and Answers**
- **The Lone Ranger** (reruns)
- **Number Please**
- **Pip the Piper**
- **The Road to Reality**
- **Seven Keys**
- **Walt Disney Presents**

**Not Returning From 1959-60**

- Music Bingo
- Open Hearing
- Pantomime Quiz
- My Friend Flicka (reruns)

=== CBS ===
**Returning Series**

- Art Linkletter's House Party
- As the World Turns
- The Brighter Day
- Camera Three
- Captain Kangaroo
- CBS Saturday News
- The Clear Horizon
- College Bowl
- December Bride (reruns)
- The Edge of Night
- Eye on New York
- Face the Nation
- Full Circle
- The Guiding Light
- Lamp Unto My Feet
- Look Up and Live
- Love of Life
- I Love Lucy (reruns)
- Mighty Mouse Playhouse
- The Millionaire (reruns)
- NFL on CBS
- The Roy Rogers Show (reruns)
- Search for Tomorrow
- The Secret Storm
- Sky King (reruns)
- Sunrise Semester
- Television Workshop
- The Twentieth Century
- UN in Action
- The Verdict is Yours
- Video Village

**New Series**

- **Accent**
- **Double Exposure**
- **Face the Facts**
- **The Magic Land of Allakazam**
- **Ted Mack's Amateur Hour**
- **Washington Conversation**
- **Your Surprise Package**

**Not Returning From 1959-60**

- Conquest
- For Better or Worse
- FYI
- The Heckle and Jeckle Cartoon Show (returned in 1965)
- The Last Word
- Montage
- On the Go
- The Red Rowe Show
- Small World

=== NBC ===
**Returning Series**

- Catholic Hour
- Chet Huntley Reporting
- Concentration
- Continental Classroom
- Detective's Diary (reruns)
- Edwin Newman Reporting
- Eternal Light
- Dough Re Mi
- From These Roots
- Frontiers of Faith
- Fury (reruns)
- It Could Be You
- The Lone Ranger (reruns)
- The Loretta Young Theater
- Meet the Press
- Open Mind
- Play Your Hunch
- The Price Is Right
- The Today Show
- True Story
- Truth or Consequences
- Watch Mr. Wizard
- Young Doctor Malone
- Youth Forum

**New Series**

- **Celebrity Golf**
- **Here's Hollywood**
- **The Jan Murray Show: Charge Account**
- **King Leonardo and His Short Subjects**
- **Make Room for Daddy** (reruns)
- **People are Funny** (reruns)
- **Pip the Piper**
- **Say When!**
- **The Shari Lewis Show**

**Not Returning From 1959-60**

- Briefing Session / Dateline U.N.
- Circus Boy (reruns)
- Decision
- Detective's Diary
- Fury
- House on High Street
- Howdy Doody
- Laughter Is a Funny Business
- Queen for a Day (moved to ABC)
- Recital Hall
- The Ruff and Reddy Show
- Saber of London
- Split Personality
- The Thin Man (reruns)
- Tic-Tac-Dough
- Time: Present
- Treasure Hunt

== See also ==
- 1960-61 United States network television schedule (prime-time)
- 1960-61 United States network television schedule (late night)

== Sources ==
- https://web.archive.org/web/20071015122215/http://curtalliaume.com/abc_day.html
- https://web.archive.org/web/20071015122235/http://curtalliaume.com/cbs_day.html
- https://web.archive.org/web/20071012211242/http://curtalliaume.com/nbc_day.html
- Castleman & Podrazik, The TV Schedule Book, McGraw-Hill Paperbacks, 1984
- Hyatt, The Encyclopedia Of Daytime Television, Billboard Books, 1997
- TV schedules, **NEW YORK TIMES**, September 1960-September 1961 (microfilm)
