= 1959–60 United States network television schedule (daytime) =

The following is the 1959–60 daytime network television schedule for the three major English-language commercial broadcast networks in the United States. It covers the weekday daytime hours from September 1959 to August 1960.

Talk shows are highlighted in yellow, local programming is white, reruns of prime-time programming are orange, game shows are pink, soap operas are chartreuse, news programs are gold and all others are light blue. New series are highlighted in bold.

== Monday-Friday ==
Network		6:00 am	6:30 am	7:00 am	7:30 am	8:00 am	8:30 am	9:00 am	9:30 am	10:00 am	10:30 am	11:00 am	11:30 am	noon	12:30 pm	1:00 pm	1:30 pm	2:00 pm	2:30 pm	3:00 pm	3:30 pm	4:00 pm	4:30 pm	5:00 pm	5:30 pm	6:00 pm	6:30 pm
ABC	Fall	local programming											The Gale Storm Show (R)	Love That Bob (R)	Pantomime Quiz	Music Bingo	local programming	Day in Court	local programming	Beat the Clock	Who Do You Trust?	American Bandstand			**The Adventures Of Rin Tin Tin** (Mon/Tue/Fri) (R); **My Friend Flicka** (Wed/Thu) (R)	John Daly with the News 6:15: local programming	local programming
ABC	Winter	local programming											The Gale Storm Show (R)	Love That Bob (R)	Pantomime Quiz	**About Faces**	local programming	Day in Court	local programming	Beat the Clock	Who Do You Trust?	American Bandstand			My Friend Flicka (Mon-Wed) (R); **Rocky and His Friends** (Thu); The Adventures Of Rin Tin Tin (Fri) (R)	John Daly with the News 6:15: local programming	local programming
ABC	Spring	local programming											The Gale Storm Show (R)	Love That Bob (R)	Pantomime Quiz	**About Faces**	local programming	Day in Court	local programming	Beat the Clock	Who Do You Trust?	American Bandstand			**Captain Gallant Of the Foreign Legion** (Mon) (R); Rocky and His Friends (Tue/Thu); My Friend Flicka (Wed) (R); The Adventures Of Rin Tin Tin (Fri) (R)	John Daly with the News 6:15: local programming	local programming
CBS	Fall	Sunrise Semester				Captain Kangaroo		local programming		On the Go	**The Red Rowe Show**	I Love Lucy (R)	**December Bride** (R)	Love of Life	12:30 pm: Search for Tomorrow 12:45 pm: The Guiding Light	local programming	As the World Turns	For Better or Worse	Art Linkletter's House Party	The Millionaire (R)	The Verdict is Yours	4:00 pm: The Brighter Day 4:15 pm: The Secret Storm	The Edge of Night	local programming			
CBS	Summer	Sunrise Semester				Captain Kangaroo		local programming		I Love Lucy (R)	**Video Village**	December Bride (R)	**The Clear Horizon**	Love of Life	12:30 pm: Search for Tomorrow 12:45 pm: The Guiding Light	local programming	As the World Turns	**Full Circle**	Art Linkletter's House Party	The Millionaire (R)	The Verdict is Yours	4:00 pm: The Brighter Day 4:15 pm: The Secret Storm	The Edge of Night	local programming			
NBC	Fall	Continental Classroom		The Today Show				local programming		Dough Re Mi	Treasure Hunt	The Price Is Right (In COLOR starting 12/14)	Concentration	Tic-Tac-Dough	12:30 pm: It Could Be You In COLOR 12:55 pm: NBC News Update	local programming	**The Thin Man** (R)	Queen for a Day	local programming	Young Doctor Malone	From These Roots	**House on High Street**	**Split Personality**	local programming			
NBC	October	Continental Classroom		The Today Show				local programming		Dough Re Mi	Treasure Hunt	The Price Is Right (In COLOR starting 12/14)	Concentration	Truth or Consequences	12:30 pm: It Could Be You In COLOR 12:55 pm: NBC News Update	local programming	**The Thin Man** (R)	Queen for a Day	local programming	Young Doctor Malone	From These Roots	**House on High Street**	**Split Personality**	local programming			
NBC	Winter	Continental Classroom		The Today Show				local programming		Dough Re Mi	**Play Your Hunch**	The Price Is Right (In COLOR starting 12/14)	Concentration	Truth or Consequences	12:30 pm: It Could Be You In COLOR 12:55 pm: NBC News Update	local programming	**The Thin Man** (R)	Queen for a Day	local programming	Young Doctor Malone	From These Roots	**The Loretta Young Theater** (R)	local programming				

== Saturday ==
Network		7:00 am	7:30 am	8:00 am	8:30 am	9:00 am	9:30 am	10:00 am	10:30 am	11:00 am	11:30 am	noon	12:30 pm	1:00 pm	1:30 pm	2:00 pm	2:30 pm	3:00 pm	3:30 pm	4:00 pm	4:30 pm	5:00 pm	5:30 pm
ABC		local programming										**Lunch with Soupy Sales**	local programming										
CBS	Fall	local programming	Sunrise Semester	Captain Kangaroo		local programming		The Heckle and Jeckle Cartoon Show	Mighty Mouse Playhouse	I Love Lucy (R)	The Lone Ranger (R)	**Sky King** (R)	local programming										
CBS	Spring	local programming	Sunrise Semester	Captain Kangaroo		local programming		The Heckle and Jeckle Cartoon Show	Mighty Mouse Playhouse	The Lone Ranger (R)	I Love Lucy (R)	**Sky King** (R)	local programming										
NBC	Fall	local programming						Howdy Doody In COLOR	The Ruff and Reddy Show In COLOR	Fury	Circus Boy (R)	True Story	Detective's Diary	local programming									
NBC	Summer	local programming						Howdy Doody In COLOR	The Ruff and Reddy Show In COLOR	Fury	Circus Boy (R)	True Story	Detective's Diary	Watch Mr. Wizard	local programming								

== Sunday ==
Network		7:00 am	7:30 am	8:00 am	8:30 am	9:00 am	9:30 am	10:00 am	10:30 am	11:00 am	11:30 am	noon	12:30 pm	1:00 pm	1:30 pm	2:00 pm	2:30 pm	3:00 pm	3:30 pm	4:00 pm	4:30 pm	5:00 pm	5:30 pm	6:00 pm	6:30 pm
ABC	Fall	local programming												College News Conference	local programming			Open Hearing	local programming						
ABC	October	local programming												College News Conference	local programming			Open Hearing	local programming	The Paul Winchell and Jerry Mahoney Show	local programming	**Matty's Funday Funnies**	local programming		
ABC	Spring	local programming												College News Conference	local programming			Open Hearing	local programming			**Matty's Funday Funnies**	local programming		
CBS	Fall	local programming						Lamp Unto My Feet	Look Up and Live	UN in Action	Camera Three	local programming	Face the Nation	CBS Sports and/or local programming								The Last Word	College Bowl	Small World	The Twentieth Century
CBS	November	local programming						Lamp Unto My Feet	Look Up and Live	UN in Action	Camera Three	local programming	Face the Nation	CBS Sports and/or local programming								Conquest	College Bowl	Small World	The Twentieth Century
CBS	Winter	local programming						Lamp Unto My Feet	Look Up and Live	**FYI**	Camera Three	**Television Workshop**		CBS Sports and/or local programming							Face the Nation	Conquest	College Bowl	Small World	The Twentieth Century
CBS	Spring	local programming						Lamp Unto My Feet	Look Up and Live	**FYI**	Camera Three	**Television Workshop**		CBS Sports and/or local programming								Face the Nation	College Bowl	Small World	The Twentieth Century
CBS	Summer	local programming						Lamp Unto My Feet	Look Up and Live	**Montage**	Camera Three	CBS Sports and/or local programming											Face the Nation	FYI	The Twentieth Century
NBC	Fall	local programming									Watch Mr. Wizard	**Decision**	Youth Forum	Open Mind	Frontiers of Faith / Eternal Light / Catholic Hour	NBC Sports and/or local programming							Time: Present	Meet the Press	Saber of London
NBC	mid-Fall	local programming									Watch Mr. Wizard	**Briefing Session** / **Dateline U.N.**	Youth Forum	Open Mind	Frontiers of Faith / Eternal Light / Catholic Hour	NBC Sports and/or local programming							Time: Present	Meet the Press	Saber of London
NBC	Summer	local programming									Laughter Is A Funny Business	local programming		Open Mind	Frontiers of Faith / Eternal Light / Catholic Hour	NBC Sports and/or local programming						Recital Hall		Meet the Press	Edwin Newman Reporting

== By network ==
=== ABC ===
**Returning Series**

- American Bandstand
- Beat the Clock
- College News Conference
- Day in Court
- The Gale Storm Show (reruns)
- Love That Bob (reruns)
- Music Bingo
- Open Hearing
- Pantomime Quiz
- The Paul Winchell and Jerry Mahoney Show
- Who Do You Trust?

**New Series**

- **About Faces**
- **The Adventures of Rin-Tin-Tin** (reruns)
- **Captain Gallant of the Foreign Legion** (reruns)
- **Lunch with Soupy Sales**
- **Matty's Funday Funnies**
- **My Friend Flicka** (reruns)
- **Rocky and His Friends**

**Not Returning From 1958-59**

- Chance for Romance
- The Liberace Show
- The Mickey Mouse Club
- Mother's Day
- The Peter Lind Hayes Show
- Play Your Hunch (returned in 1960 on NBC)
- Walt Disney's Adventure Time

=== CBS ===
**Returning Series**

- Art Linkletter's House Party
- As the World Turns
- The Brighter Day
- Camera Three
- Captain Kangaroo
- College Bowl
- Conquest
- The Edge of Night
- Face the Nation
- For Better or Worse
- The Guiding Light
- The Heckle and Jeckle Cartoon Show
- Lamp Unto My Feet
- The Last Word
- Look Up and Live
- The Lone Ranger (reruns)
- Love of Life
- I Love Lucy (reruns)
- Mighty Mouse Playhouse
- The Millionaire (reruns)
- NFL on CBS
- On the Go
- Search for Tomorrow
- The Secret Storm
- Small World
- Sunrise Semester
- The Twentieth Century
- UN in Action
- The Verdict is Yours

**New Series**

- **The Clear Horizon**
- **December Bride** (reruns)
- **Full Circle**
- **FYI**
- **Montage**
- **The Red Rowe Show**
- **Sky King** (reruns)
- **Television Workshop**
- **Video Village**

**Not Returning From 1958-59**

- The Adventures of Robin Hood
- Air Power (reruns)
- Arthur Godfrey Time
- Behind the News
- The Big Payoff
- First Meeting
- For Love or Money
- The Great Challenge
- The Great Game of Politics
- The Jimmy Dean Show
- Play Your Hunch
- The Sam Levinson Show
- The Search
- Ted Mack's Amateur Hour
- Top Dollar
- The World of Ideas
- Young Audiences

=== NBC ===
**Returning Series**

- Catholic Hour
- Circus Boy (reruns)
- Concentration
- Continental Classroom
- Detective's Diary
- Dough Re Mi
- From These Roots
- Frontiers of Faith
- Fury
- Howdy Doody
- It Could Be You
- Meet the Press
- Open Mind
- Queen for a Day
- The Price Is Right
- The Ruff and Reddy Show
- Tic-Tac-Dough
- The Today Show
- Treasure Hunt
- True Story
- Truth or Consequences
- Watch Mr. Wizard
- Young Doctor Malone
- Youth Forum

**New Series**

- **Briefing Session / Dateline U.N.**
- **Decision**
- **Edwin Newman Reporting**
- **Eternal Light**
- **House on High Street**
- **Laughter Is a Funny Business**
- **The Loretta Young Theater**
- **Play Your Hunch**
- **Recital Hall**
- **Saber of London**
- **Split Personality**
- **The Thin Man** (reruns)
- **Time: Present**

**Not Returning From 1958-59**

- Adventuring in the Hand Arts
- Blondie (reruns)
- County Fair
- The Court of Human Relations
- For the People
- Haggis Baggis
- Kaleidoscope
- Omnibus
- Outlook
- Report from America
- They Speak for Themselves
- Today Is Ours
- Wisdom

== See also ==
- 1959-60 United States network television schedule (prime-time)
- 1959-60 United States network television schedule (late night)

== Sources ==
- https://web.archive.org/web/20071015122215/http://curtalliaume.com/abc_day.html
- https://web.archive.org/web/20071015122235/http://curtalliaume.com/cbs_day.html
- https://web.archive.org/web/20071012211242/http://curtalliaume.com/nbc_day.html
- Brooks, Tim & Marsh, Earle (2007). The Complete Directory To Prime Time Network and Cable TV Shows (9th Ed.). New York: Ballantine.
- Castleman, Harry & Podrazik, Wally (1984). The TV Schedule Book. New York: McGraw-Hill Paperbacks.
- Hyatt, Wesley (1997). The Encyclopedia Of Daytime Television. New York: Billboard Books.
- TV schedules, The New York Times, September 1959-September 1960 (microfilm).
