= 1974–75 United States network television schedule (daytime) =

The following is the 1974–75 daytime network television schedule for the three major English-language commercial broadcast networks in the United States. It covers the weekday and weekend daytime hours from September 1974 to August 1975.

Talk shows are highlighted in yellow, local programming is white, reruns of older programming are orange, game shows are pink, soap operas are chartreuse, news programs are gold, children's programs are light purple and sports programs are light blue. New series are highlighted in bold.

In an effort to strengthen ratings, NBC cancelled its Emmy Award-winning talk show Dinah's Place, hosted by Dinah Shore. In the 1974–75 season, the series was replaced by the game show Name That Tune, which had been dropped in 1954. The move came as daytime game shows such as Hollywood Squares grew in popularity, overshadowing daytime soap operas.

PBS, the Public Broadcasting Service, was in operation, but the schedule was set by each local station.

== Monday-Friday ==
Network		6:00 am	6:30 am	7:00 am	7:30 am	8:00 am	8:30 am	9:00 am	9:30 am	10:00 am	10:30 am	11:00 am	11:30 am	noon	12:30 pm	1:00 pm	1:30 pm	2:00 pm	2:30 pm	3:00 pm	3:30 pm	4:00 pm	4:30 pm	5:00 pm	5:30 pm	6:00 pm	6:30 pm
ABC	Fall	Local/syndicated programming											The Brady Bunch reruns	Password	Split Second	All My Children	Let's Make a Deal	The Newlywed Game	The Girl in My Life	General Hospital	One Life to Live	The $10,000 Pyramid	Local/syndicated programming				ABC News
ABC	Winter	Local/syndicated programming		**AM America**				Local/syndicated programming					The Brady Bunch reruns	Password	Split Second	All My Children	Let's Make a Deal	The $10,000 Pyramid	**The Big Showdown**	General Hospital	One Life to Live	**The Money Maze**	Local/syndicated programming				ABC News
ABC	Spring	Local/syndicated programming		**AM America**				Local/syndicated programming					**Blankety Blanks**	Password	Split Second	All My Children	Let's Make a Deal	The $10,000 Pyramid	**The Big Showdown**	General Hospital	One Life to Live	**The Money Maze**	Local/syndicated programming				ABC News
ABC	Summer	Local/syndicated programming		**AM America**				Local/syndicated programming					The Brady Bunch reruns	**Showoffs**	All My Children	**Ryan's Hope**	Let's Make a Deal	The $10,000 Pyramid	**Rhyme and Reason**	General Hospital	One Life to Live	**You Don't Say!**	Local/syndicated programming				ABC News
CBS	Fall	Sunrise Semester	Local/syndicated programming	CBS Morning News		Captain Kangaroo		Local/syndicated programming		The Joker's Wild	Gambit	Now You See It	Love of Life; 11:55 am: CBS Midday News	The Young and the Restless	Search for Tomorrow	Local/syndicated programming	As the World Turns	The Guiding Light	The Edge of Night	The Price Is Right	Match Game '74	Tattletales	Local/syndicated programming				CBS Evening News
CBS	Winter	Sunrise Semester	Local/syndicated programming	CBS Morning News		Captain Kangaroo		Local/syndicated programming		The Joker's Wild	Gambit	Now You See It	Love of Life; 11:55 am: CBS Midday News	The Young and the Restless	Search for Tomorrow	Local/syndicated programming	As the World Turns	The Guiding Light	The Edge of Night	The Price Is Right	Match Game '75	Tattletales	Local/syndicated programming				CBS Evening News
CBS	Summer	Sunrise Semester	Local/syndicated programming	CBS Morning News		Captain Kangaroo		Local/syndicated programming		**Spin-Off**	Gambit	Tattletales	Love of Life; 11:55 am: CBS Midday News	The Young and the Restless	Search for Tomorrow	Local/syndicated programming	As the World Turns	The Guiding Light	The Edge of Night	The Price Is Right	Match Game '75	**Musical Chairs**	Local/syndicated programming				CBS Evening News
CBS	August	Sunrise Semester	Local/syndicated programming	CBS Morning News		Captain Kangaroo		Local/syndicated programming		**Spin-Off**	The Price Is Right	Gambit	Love of Life; 11:55 am: CBS Midday News	The Young and the Restless	Search for Tomorrow	Local/syndicated programming	As the World Turns	The Guiding Light	The Edge of Night	Match Game '75	Tattletales	**Musical Chairs**	Local/syndicated programming				CBS Evening News
NBC	Fall	Local/syndicated programming		Today				Local/syndicated programming		Name That Tune	Winning Streak	High Rollers	The Hollywood Squares	Jackpot	Celebrity Sweepstakes; 12:55 pm: NBC News Update	Local/syndicated programming	Jeopardy!	Days of Our Lives	The Doctors	Another World	How to Survive a Marriage	Somerset	Local/syndicated programming				NBC Nightly News
NBC	Winter	Local/syndicated programming		Today				Local/syndicated programming		Celebrity Sweepstakes	**Wheel of Fortune**	High Rollers	The Hollywood Squares	Jackpot	**Blank Check**; 12:55 pm: NBC News Update	Local/syndicated programming	How to Survive a Marriage	Days of Our Lives	The Doctors	Another World		Somerset	Local/syndicated programming				NBC Nightly News
NBC	Spring	Local/syndicated programming		Today				Local/syndicated programming		Celebrity Sweepstakes	**Wheel of Fortune**	High Rollers	The Hollywood Squares	Jackpot	**Blank Check**; 12:55 pm: NBC News Update	Local/syndicated programming	Days of Our Lives		The Doctors	Another World		Somerset	Local/syndicated programming				NBC Nightly News
NBC	Summer	Local/syndicated programming		Today				Local/syndicated programming		Celebrity Sweepstakes	**Wheel of Fortune**	High Rollers	The Hollywood Squares	**The Magnificent Marble Machine**	Jackpot; 12:55 pm: NBC News Update	Local/syndicated programming	Days of Our Lives		The Doctors	Another World		Somerset	Local/syndicated programming				NBC Nightly News

=== Notes ===
- ABC had a 6PM (ET)/5PM (CT) feed for their newscast, depending on stations' schedule.

== Saturday ==
Network		7:00 am	7:30 am	8:00 am	8:30 am	9:00 am	9:30 am	10:00 am	10:30 am	11:00 am	11:30 am	noon	12:30 pm	1:00 pm	1:30 pm	2:00 pm	2:30 pm	3:00 pm	3:30 pm	4:00 pm	4:30 pm	5:00 pm	5:30 pm	6:00 pm	6:30 pm
ABC		Local/syndicated programming		Yogi's Gang (R)	The Bugs Bunny Show	**Hong Kong Phooey**	**The New Adventures of Gilligan**	**Devlin**	**Korg: 70,000 B.C.**	Super Friends (R)		**These Are the Days**	American Bandstand		ABC Sports and/or local/syndicated programming										
CBS	Fall	Local/syndicated programming		Speed Buggy (R)	Scooby-Doo, Where Are You! (R)	Jeannie (R)	**Partridge Family 2200 A.D.**	**Valley of the Dinosaurs**	**Shazam!**	**The Harlem Globetrotters Popcorn Machine**	**The Hudson Brothers Razzle Dazzle Show**	**The U.S. of Archie**	Fat Albert and the Cosby Kids (R)	CBS Children's Film Festival		CBS Sports and/or local/syndicated programming								CBS Evening News	Local/syndicated programming
CBS	Winter	Local/syndicated programming		My Favorite Martians (R)	Speed Buggy (R)	Jeannie (R)	**Partridge Family 2200 A.D.**	Scooby-Doo, Where Are You! (R)	**Shazam!**	Valley of the Dinosaurs	**The Hudson Brothers Razzle Dazzle Show**	The Harlem Globetrotters Popcorn Machine	Fat Albert and the Cosby Kids (R)	CBS Children's Film Festival		CBS Sports and/or local/syndicated programming								CBS Evening News	Local/syndicated programming
CBS	Spring	Local/syndicated programming		My Favorite Martians (R)	Speed Buggy (R)	Jeannie (R)	The Pebbles and Bamm-Bamm Show (R)	Scooby-Doo, Where Are You! (R)	**Shazam!**	Valley of the Dinosaurs	**The Hudson Brothers Razzle Dazzle Show**	The Harlem Globetrotters Popcorn Machine	Fat Albert and the Cosby Kids (R)	CBS Children's Film Festival		CBS Sports and/or local/syndicated programming								CBS Evening News	Local/syndicated programming
NBC		Local/syndicated programming		The Addams Family (R)	**Wheelie and the Chopper Bunch**	Emergency +4	**Run, Joe, Run**	**Land of the Lost**	Sigmund and the Sea Monsters	The Pink Panther Show	Star Trek: The Animated Series	The Jetsons (R)	Go!	NBC Sports and/or local/syndicated programming										Local/syndicated programming	NBC Saturday Night News

== Sunday ==
Network		7:00 am	7:30 am	8:00 am	8:30 am	9:00 am	9:30 am	10:00 am	10:30 am	11:00 am	11:30 am	noon	12:30 pm	1:00 pm	1:30 pm	2:00 pm	2:30 pm	3:00 pm	3:30 pm	4:00 pm	4:30 pm	5:00 pm	5:30 pm	6:00 pm	6:30 pm
ABC		Local/syndicated programming							Lassie's Rescue Rangers (R)	Goober and the Ghost Chasers (R)	Make A Wish	Issues and Answers		ABC Sports and/or local/syndicated programming											
CBS	Fall	Local/syndicated programming		My Favorite Martians (R)	Bailey's Comets (R)	Local/syndicated programming		Lamp Unto My Feet	Look Up and Live	Camera Three	Face The Nation	Local/syndicated programming	NFL on CBS and/or local/syndicated programming											60 Minutes	
CBS	Winter	Local/syndicated programming		The U.S. of Archie	Bailey's Comets (R)	Local/syndicated programming		Lamp Unto My Feet	Look Up and Live	Camera Three	Face The Nation	CBS Sports and/or local/syndicated programming												60 Minutes	
CBS	Summer	Local/syndicated programming		The U.S. of Archie	Bailey's Comets (R)	Local/syndicated programming		Lamp Unto My Feet	Look Up and Live	Camera Three	Face The Nation	CBS Sports and/or local/syndicated programming												Local/syndicated programming	CBS Evening News
NBC	Fall	Local/syndicated programming										Meet the Press	Grandstand	NFL on NBC and/or local/syndicated programming										Local/syndicated programming	NBC Sunday Night News
NBC	Winter	Local/syndicated programming											Meet the Press	NBC Sports and/or local/syndicated programming										Local/syndicated programming	NBC Sunday Night News

== By network ==
=== ABC ===
**Returning Series**

- The $10,000 Pyramid moved from CBS
- ABC Evening News
- All My Children
- American Bandstand
- The Brady Bunch (reruns)
- The Bugs Bunny Show
- General Hospital
- The Girl in My Life
- Goober and the Ghost Chasers (reruns)
- Issues and Answers
- Lassie's Rescue Rangers (reruns)
- Let's Make a Deal
- Make a Wish
- The Newlywed Game
- One Life to Live
- Password
- Schoolhouse Rock!
- Split Second
- Super Friends (reruns)
- Yogi's Gang (reruns)

**New Series**

- **AM America**
- **The Big Showdown**
- **Blankety Blanks**
- **Devlin**
- **Hong Kong Phooey**
- **Korg: 70,000 B.C.**
- **The Money Maze**
- **The New Adventures of Gilligan**
- **Rhyme and Reason**
- **Ryan's Hope**
- **Showoffs**
- **These Are the Days**
- **You Don't Say!**

**Not Returning From 1973-74**

- The ABC Saturday Superstar Movie
- The Brady Kids
- H.R. Pufnstuf (reruns)
- Kid Power (reruns)
- Love, American Style (reruns)
- Mission: Magic!
- The Osmonds (reruns)

=== CBS ===
**Returning Series**

- As the World Turns
- Bailey's Comets (reruns)
- Camera Three
- Captain Kangaroo
- CBS Children's Film Festival
- CBS Evening News
- CBS Morning News
- The Edge of Night
- Face the Nation
- Fat Albert and the Cosby Kids
- Gambit
- The Guiding Light
- Jeannie (reruns)
- The Joker's Wild
- Lamp Unto My Feet
- Look Up and Live
- Love of Life
- Match Game
- My Favorite Martians (reruns)
- Now You See It
- The Pebbles and Bamm-Bamm Show (reruns)
- The Price Is Right
- Scooby-Doo, Where Are You! (reruns)
- Search for Tomorrow
- Speed Buggy (reruns)
- Sunrise Semester
- Tattletales
- The Young and the Restless

**New Series**

- **The Harlem Globetrotters Popcorn Machine**
- **The Hudson Brothers Razzle Dazzle Show**
- **Musical Chairs**
- **Partridge Family 2200 A.D.**
- **Shazam!**
- **Spin-Off**
- **The U.S. of Archie**
- **Valley of the Dinosaurs**

**Not Returning From 1973-74**

- The $10,000 Pyramid (moved to ABC)
- The Amazing Chan and the Chan Clan (reruns)
- Everything's Archie
- The Flintstones Comedy Show (reruns)
- Help!... It's the Hair Bear Bunch! (reruns)
- Josie and the Pussycats (reruns)
- The New Scooby-Doo Movies
- Sabrina the Teenage Witch (reruns)
- The Secret Storm

=== NBC ===
**Returning Series**

- The Addams Family (reruns)
- Another World
- Celebrity Sweepstakes
- Days of Our Lives
- The Doctors
- Emergency +4
- Go!
- High Rollers
- The Hollywood Squares
- How to Survive a Marriage
- Jackpot
- Jeopardy!
- The Jetsons (reruns)
- Meet the Press
- Name That Tune
- NBC Nightly News
- NBC Saturday Night News
- NBC Sunday Night News
- The New Pink Panther Show
- Sigmund and the Sea Monsters
- Somerset
- Star Trek: The Animated Series
- Today
- Winning Streak

**New Series**

- **Blank Check**
- **Land of the Lost**
- **The Magnificent Marble Machine**
- **Run, Joe, Run**
- **Wheel of Fortune**
- **Wheelie and the Chopper Bunch**

**Not Returning From 1973-74**

- Baffle
- Butch Cassidy and the Sundance Kids
- Dinah's Place
- Inch High, Private Eye
- Lidsville (reruns)
- Return to Peyton Place
- Three on a Match
- The Who, What, or Where Game
- The Wizard of Odds

== See also ==
- 1974-75 United States network television schedule (prime-time)
- 1974-75 United States network television schedule (late night)
