= 1978–79 United States network television schedule (daytime) =

The following is the 1978–79 daytime network television schedule for the three major English-language commercial broadcast networks in the United States. It covers the weekday and weekend daytime hours from September 1978 to August 1979.

== Legend ==
- Light yellow indicates talk shows.
- Green indicates soap operas.
- Pink indicates game shows.
- Gold indicates news and public affairs programming.
- Light teal indicates sporting events.
- White indicates local programming.
- Light purple indicates children's programming.
- Gray indicates encore programming (e.g., reruns of prime-time programming).
- New series are highlighted in **bold**.

== Schedule ==
- All times correspond to U.S. Eastern and Pacific Time scheduling (except for some live sports or events). Except where affiliates slot certain programs outside their network-dictated timeslots, subtract one hour for Central, Mountain, Alaska, and Hawaii-Aleutian times.
- Local schedules may differ, as affiliates have the option to pre-empt or delay network programs. Such scheduling may be limited to preemptions caused by local or national breaking news or weather coverage (which may force stations to tape delay certain programs to other timeslots) and any major sports events scheduled to air in a weekday timeslot (mainly during major holidays). Stations may air shows at other times at their preference.

=== Monday–Friday ===
Network		6:00 am	6:30 am	7:00 am	7:30 am	8:00 am	8:30 am	9:00 am	9:30 am	10:00 am	10:30 am	11:00 am	11:30 am	noon	12:30 pm	1:00 pm	1:30 pm	2:00 pm	2:30 pm	3:00 pm	3:30 pm	4:00 pm	4:30 pm	5:00 pm	5:30 pm	6:00 pm	6:30 pm
ABC	Fall	Local/syndicated programming		Good Morning America				Local/syndicated programming				Happy Days	Family Feud	The $20,000 Pyramid	Ryan's Hope	All My Children		One Life to Live		General Hospital		The Edge of Night	Local/syndicated programming				ABC World News Tonight
ABC	Spring	Local/syndicated programming		Good Morning America				Local/syndicated programming				**Laverne & Shirley**	Family Feud	The $20,000 Pyramid	Ryan's Hope	All My Children		One Life to Live		General Hospital		The Edge of Night	Local/syndicated programming				ABC World News Tonight
CBS	Fall	Sunrise Semester	Local/syndicated programming	CBS Morning News		Captain Kangaroo		Local/syndicated programming		All in the Family	The Price Is Right		Love of Life CBS News (11:55)	The Young and the Restless	Search for Tomorrow	Local/syndicated programming	As the World Turns		Guiding Light		**M*A*S*H**	Match Game '78	Local/syndicated programming				CBS Evening News
CBS	Winter	Sunrise Semester	Local/syndicated programming	**Morning**		Captain Kangaroo		Local/syndicated programming		All in the Family	The Price Is Right		Love of Life CBS News (11:55)	The Young and the Restless	Search for Tomorrow	Local/syndicated programming	As the World Turns		Guiding Light		**M*A*S*H**	Match Game '79	Local/syndicated programming				CBS Evening News
CBS	Spring	Sunrise Semester	Local/syndicated programming	**Morning**		Captain Kangaroo		Local/syndicated programming		All in the Family	**Whew!** CBS Mid-Morning News (10:55)	The Price Is Right		Local/syndicated programming	Search for Tomorrow	The Young and the Restless	As the World Turns		Guiding Light		**M*A*S*H**	Love of Life	Local/syndicated programming				CBS Evening News
NBC	Fall	Local/syndicated programming		Today				Local/syndicated programming		Card Sharks	**Jeopardy!**	High Rollers	Wheel of Fortune	America Alive!		The Hollywood Squares	Days of Our Lives		The Doctors	Another World		Local/syndicated programming					NBC Nightly News
NBC	Winter	Local/syndicated programming		Today				Local/syndicated programming		Card Sharks	**All Star Secrets**	High Rollers	Wheel of Fortune	Jeopardy!	**Password Plus**	The Hollywood Squares	Days of Our Lives		The Doctors	Another World		Local/syndicated programming					NBC Nightly News
NBC	Spring	Local/syndicated programming		Today				Local/syndicated programming		Card Sharks	**All Star Secrets**	High Rollers	Wheel of Fortune	Password Plus	The Hollywood Squares	Days of Our Lives		The Doctors	Another World			Local/syndicated programming					NBC Nightly News
NBC	Summer	Local/syndicated programming		Today				Local/syndicated programming		Card Sharks	The Hollywood Squares	High Rollers	Wheel of Fortune	**Mindreaders**	Password Plus	Days of Our Lives		The Doctors	Another World			Local/syndicated programming					NBC Nightly News

Notes:

- Programs aired before 9:00AM aired at the same time in all time zones. CBS's Sunrise Semester was a half-hour program which aired at either 6:00 or 6:30 AM, depending on the station.
- Programs scheduled after 10:00 AM Eastern aired one hour earlier (starting at 9:00 AM) in the Central and Pacific time zones. Stations in the Mountain time zone that started their network schedule at 8:00 AM would follow the Central and Pacific pattern that year.
- Some network programs, particularly before 7:00 AM and after 10:00/9:00 AM, were subject to preemption by local affiliate stations in favor of syndicated or locally produced programs.
- On ABC, World News Tonight was produced at 6:00 PM Eastern/5:00 PM Central, and aired live by some affiliates. This early feed of the broadcast was discontinued in 1982.
- NBC aired NBC News Updates at 10:57, 11:57, 12:57, 2:57 until June 1979, and 3:57.
- A CBS News Razzmatazz special would occasionally preempt CBS' 4:00PM show.
- On April 23, 1979, CBS returned the noon timeslot to local affiliates, in exchange for giving the 1PM slot, which The Young and the Restless was placed.

=== Saturday ===
Network		7:00 am	7:30 am	8:00 am	8:30 am	9:00 am	9:30 am	10:00 am	10:30 am	11:00 am	11:30 am	noon	12:30 pm	1:00 pm	1:30 pm	2:00 pm	2:30 pm	3:00 pm	3:30 pm	4:00 pm	4:30 pm	5:00 pm	5:30 pm	6:00 pm	6:30 pm
ABC	Fall	Local and/or syndicated programming		Scooby-Doo, Where Are You! Schoolhouse Rock! (8:25)	**Fangface** Schoolhouse Rock! (8:55)	**Challenge of the Superfriends** Schoolhouse Rock! (9:55)		Scooby's All-Stars Schoolhouse Rock! (11:25)			**The All New Pink Panther Show** Schoolhouse Rock! (11:55)	ABC Weekend Special	American Bandstand		ABC Sports and/or local programming										**ABC World News Saturday**
ABC	November	Local and/or syndicated programming		Scooby's All-Stars Schoolhouse Rock! (9:25)			Challenge of the Superfriends Schoolhouse Rock! (10:55)			Fangface Schoolhouse Rock! (11:25)	**The All New Pink Panther Show** Schoolhouse Rock! (11:55)	ABC Weekend Special	American Bandstand		ABC Sports and/or local programming										**ABC World News Saturday**
ABC	January	Local and/or syndicated programming		Scooby's All-Stars Schoolhouse Rock! (9:25)			Challenge of the Superfriends Schoolhouse Rock! (10:55)			Fangface Schoolhouse Rock! (11:25)	**The All New Pink Panther Show** Schoolhouse Rock! (11:55)	ABC Weekend Special	American Bandstand		ABC Sports and/or local programming									Local news	Local and/or syndicated programming
ABC	June	Local and/or syndicated programming		Fangface Schoolhouse Rock! (8:25)	Scooby's All-Stars Schoolhouse Rock! (9:55)			Challenge of the Superfriends Schoolhouse Rock! (11:25)			**Bigfoot and Wildboy** Schoolhouse Rock! (11:55)	The All New Pink Panther Show Schoolhouse Rock! (12:25)	American Bandstand		ABC Sports and/or local programming									Local news	Local and/or syndicated programming
CBS	Fall	Local and/or syndicated programming		**The All New Popeye Hour**		The Bugs Bunny/Road Runner Show			**Tarzan and the Super 7**			Space Academy (R)	Fat Albert and the Cosby Kids (R)	Ark II (R)	**30 Minutes**	CBS Sports and/or local programming								Local news	CBS Evening News
CBS	May	Local and/or syndicated programming		**The All New Popeye Hour**		The Bugs Bunny/Road Runner Show			**Tarzan and the Super 7**			Space Academy (R)	Fat Albert and the Cosby Kids (R)	Ark II (R)	CBS Children's Film Festival	CBS Sports and/or local programming								Local news	CBS Evening News
NBC	Fall	Local and/or syndicated programming		**Yogi's Space Race** **The Metric Marvels** (9:25)			**The Godzilla Power Hour**: **Jana of the Jungle**; **The Metric Marvels** (10:25)		**Fantastic Four**	**The Krofft Superstar Hour** **The Metric Marvels** (11:55)		**Fabulous Funnies**	Baggy Pants and the Nitwits (R)	NBC Sports and/or local programming										Local news	NBC Nightly News
NBC	November	Local and/or syndicated programming		Galaxy Goof-Ups	Fantastic Four	The Godzilla Super 90: Jana of the Jungle; Jonny Quest (R); The Metric Marvels (10:25)			**The Daffy Duck Show** The Metric Marvels (10:55)	Yogi's Space Race The Metric Marvels (11:55)		**Fabulous Funnies**	The Bay City Rollers Show	NBC Sports and/or local programming										Local news	NBC Nightly News
NBC	February	Local and/or syndicated programming		Yogi's Space Race	Fantastic Four	The Godzilla Super 90: Jana of the Jungle; Jonny Quest (R); The Metric Marvels (10:25)			**The Daffy Duck Show** The Metric Marvels (10:55)	**The New Fred and Barney Show**	The Jetsons (R) The Metric Marvels (11:55)	**Buford and the Galloping Ghost**	Fabulous Funnies	NBC Sports and/or local programming										Local news	NBC Nightly News
NBC	March	Local and/or syndicated programming		The Alvin Show	Fantastic Four	The Godzilla Super 90: Jana of the Jungle; Jonny Quest (R); The Metric Marvels (10:25)			**The Daffy Duck Show** The Metric Marvels (10:55)	**The New Fred and Barney Show**	The Jetsons (R) The Metric Marvels (11:55)	**Buford and the Galloping Ghost**	Fabulous Funnies	NBC Sports and/or local programming										Local news	NBC Nightly News

In the News aired ten times during CBS's Saturday morning shows.

=== Sunday ===
Network		7:00 am	7:30 am	8:00 am	8:30 am	9:00 am	9:30 am	10:00 am	10:30 am	11:00 am	11:30 am	noon	12:30 pm	1:00 pm	1:30 pm	2:00 pm	2:30 pm	3:00 pm	3:30 pm	4:00 pm	4:30 pm	5:00 pm	5:30 pm	6:00 pm	6:30 pm
ABC	Fall	Local and/or syndicated programming						**Kids Are People Too**			Animals, Animals, Animals	Issues and Answers	ABC Sports and/or local programming											Local news	Local and/or syndicated programming
ABC	Winter	Local and/or syndicated programming						**Kids Are People Too**			Animals, Animals, Animals	Issues and Answers	ABC Sports and/or local programming											Local news	**ABC World News Sunday**
CBS	Fall	Local and/or syndicated programming				What's New, Mr. Magoo? (R)	Clue Club (R)	Lamp Unto My Feet	Look Up and Live	Camera Three	Face the Nation	Local and/or syndicated programming	The NFL Today	NFL on CBS and/or local programming											
CBS	Mid-winter	Local and/or syndicated programming		What's New, Mr. Magoo? (R)	Clue Club (R)	**CBS News Sunday Morning**			Local and/or syndicated programming		Face the Nation	CBS Sports and/or local programming												Local news	CBS Evening News
NBC	Fall	Local and/or syndicated programming										Meet the Press	NFL '78	NFL on NBC and local programming											
NBC	Mid-winter	Local and/or syndicated programming											Meet the Press	NBC Sports and/or local programming										Local news	NBC Nightly News

== By network ==
=== ABC ===
**Returning Series**

- The $20,000 Pyramid
- ABC World News Tonight
- ABC Weekend Special
- All My Children
- American Bandstand
- Animals, Animals, Animals
- The Edge of Night
- Family Feud
- General Hospital
- Good Morning America
- Happy Days (reruns)
- Issues and Answers
- The All New Pink Panther Show (moved from NBC)
- One Life to Live
- Ryan's Hope
- Schoolhouse Rock!
- Scooby's All Stars (reruns)
- Scooby-Doo, Where Are You!

**New Series**

- **ABC World News Sunday**
- **Bigfoot and Wildboy**
- **Challenge of the Super Friends**
- **Fangface**
- **Kids Are People Too**
- **Laverne & Shirley** (reruns)

**Not Returning From 1977-78**

- ABC Evening News
- The All-New Super Friends Hour
- The Better Sex
- The Great Grape Ape Show (reruns)
- Jabberjaw (reruns)
- The Krofft Supershow
- Scooby's All-Star Laff-A-Lympics

=== CBS ===
**Returning Series**

- All in the Family (reruns)
- Ark II (reruns)
- As the World Turns
- The Bugs Bunny/Road Runner Hour
- Camera Three
- Captain Kangaroo
- CBS Children's Film Festival
- CBS Evening News
- CBS Morning News
- Clue Club (reruns)
- Face the Nation
- Fat Albert and the Cosby Kids
- Guiding Light
- Lamp Unto My Feet
- Look Up and Live
- Love of Life
- Match Game
- The Price Is Right
- Search for Tomorrow
- Space Academy (reruns)
- Sunrise Semester
- Tarzan, Lord of the Jungle
- What's New, Mr. Magoo? (reruns)
- The Young and the Restless

**New Series**

- **30 Minutes**
- **The All New Popeye Hour**
- **CBS News Sunday Morning**
- **M*A*S*H** (reruns)
- **Morning**
- **Tarzan and the Super 7**
- **Whew!**

**Not Returning From 1977-78**

- The Batman/Tarzan Adventure Hour
- The Ghost Busters (reruns)
- Here's Lucy (reruns)
- The New Tic Tac Dough continued in syndication
- Pass the Buck
- The Robonic Stooges
- The Secrets of Isis (reruns)
- The Skatebirds
- Space Academy
- Speed Buggy (reruns)
- Tattletales returned in 1982
- Wacko

=== NBC ===
**Returning Series**

- The Alvin Show (reruns)
- America Alive!
- Another World
- Baggy Pants and the Nitwits (reruns)
- Card Sharks
- The Daffy Duck Show
- Days of Our Lives
- The Doctors
- High Rollers
- The Hollywood Squares
- Jeopardy!
- The Jetsons (reruns)
- Jonny Quest (reruns)
- Meet the Press
- NBC Nightly News
- Today
- Wheel of Fortune

**New Series**

- **All Star Secrets**
- **Buford and the Galloping Ghost**
- **The Daffy Duck Show**
- **Fabulous Funnies**
- **The New Fantastic Four**
- **The New Fred and Barney Show**
- **Galaxy Goof-Ups**
- **The Godzilla Power Hour**
- **The Krofft Superstar Hour**
- **Jana of the Jungle**
- **The Metric Marvels**
- **Mindreaders**
- **Password Plus**
- **Yogi's Space Race**

**Not Returning From 1977-78**

- CB Bears
- Chico and the Man (reruns)
- For Richer, For Poorer
- The Gong Show
- I Am the Greatest: The Adventures of Muhammad Ali
- Knockout
- NBC Saturday Night News
- NBC Sunday Night News
- The New Archie and Sabrina Hour
- Think Pink Panther (moved to ABC)
- The Red Hand Gang
- Sanford and Son (reruns)
- Search and Rescue: The Alpha Team
- Space Sentinels
- Thunder
- To Say the Least

== See also ==
- 1978-79 United States network television schedule (prime-time)
- 1978-79 United States network television schedule (late night)
