= 1981–82 United States network television schedule (daytime) =

The following is the 1981–82 daytime network television schedule for the three major English-language commercial broadcast networks in the United States. It covers the weekday and weekend daytime hours from September 1981 to August 1982.

== Legend ==
- Light yellow indicates talk shows.
- Green indicates soap operas.
- Pink indicates game shows.
- Gold indicates news and public affairs programming.
- Light teal indicates sporting events.
- White indicates local programming.
- Light purple indicates children's programming.
- Gray indicates encore programming (e.g., reruns of prime-time programming).
- New series are highlighted in **bold**.

== Schedule ==
- All times correspond to U.S. Eastern and Pacific Time scheduling (except for some live sports or events). Except where affiliates slot certain programs outside their network-dictated timeslots, subtract one hour for Central, Mountain, Alaska, and Hawaii-Aleutian times.
- Local schedules may differ, as affiliates have the option to pre-empt or delay network programs. Such scheduling may be limited to preemptions caused by local or national breaking news or weather coverage (which may force stations to tape delay certain programs to other timeslots) and any major sports events scheduled to air in a weekday timeslot (mainly during major holidays). Stations may air shows at other times at their preference.

=== Monday–Friday ===
Network		6:00 am	6:30 am	7:00 am	7:30 am	8:00 am	8:30 am	9:00 am	9:30 am	10:00 am	10:30 am	11:00 am	11:30 am	noon	12:30 pm	1:00 pm	1:30 pm	2:00 pm	2:30 pm	3:00 pm	3:30 pm	4:00 pm	4:30 pm	5:00 pm	5:30 pm	6:00 pm	6:30 pm
ABC	Fall	Local/syndicated programming		Good Morning America				Local/syndicated programming				The Love Boat		Family Feud	Ryan's Hope FYI (12:58)	All My Children		One Life to Live FYI (2:58)		General Hospital FYI (3:58)		The Edge of Night	Local/syndicated programming				ABC World News Tonight
ABC	Summer	**ABC News This Morning**		Good Morning America				Local/syndicated programming				The Love Boat		Family Feud	Ryan's Hope FYI (12:58)	All My Children		One Life to Live FYI (2:58)		General Hospital FYI (3:58)		The Edge of Night	Local/syndicated programming				ABC World News Tonight
CBS	Fall	Sunrise Semester		Wake Up with the Captain	Morning			Local/syndicated programming		One Day at a Time	Alice	The Price Is Right CBS News Newsbreak (11:57)		Local/syndicated programming	The Young and the Restless		As the World Turns		Search for Tomorrow	Guiding Light CBS News Newsbreak (3:57)		**Up to the Minute**	Local/syndicated programming				CBS Evening News with Dan Rather
CBS	Winter	Sunrise Semester		Wake Up with the Captain	Morning			Local/syndicated programming		One Day at a Time	Alice	The Price Is Right CBS News Newsbreak (11:57)		Local/syndicated programming	The Young and the Restless		As the World Turns		Search for Tomorrow	Guiding Light CBS News Newsbreak (3:57)		**Tattletales**	Local/syndicated programming				CBS Evening News with Dan Rather
CBS	Spring	Sunrise Semester	Wake Up with the Captain	The CBS Morning News				Local/syndicated programming		One Day at a Time	Alice	The Price Is Right CBS News Newsbreak (11:57)		Local/syndicated programming	The Young and the Restless		As the World Turns		**Capitol**	Guiding Light CBS News Newsbreak (3:57)		**Tattletales**	Local/syndicated programming				CBS Evening News with Dan Rather
NBC	Fall	Local/syndicated programming		Today				Local/syndicated programming		Las Vegas Gambit	Blockbusters	Wheel of Fortune	**Battlestars**	Password Plus	The Doctors	Days of Our Lives		Another World		Texas		Local/syndicated programming					NBC Nightly News
NBC	Winter	Local/syndicated programming		Today				Local/syndicated programming		**The Regis Philbin Show**	Blockbusters	Wheel of Fortune	**Battlestars**	Password Plus	The Doctors	Days of Our Lives		Another World		Texas		Local/syndicated programming					NBC Nightly News
NBC	Spring	Local/syndicated programming		Today				Local/syndicated programming		**Diff'rent Strokes**	Wheel of Fortune	Texas		The Doctors	Search for Tomorrow	Days of Our Lives		Another World		**CHiPs**		Local/syndicated programming					NBC Nightly News
NBC	Summer	**Early Today**		Today				Local/syndicated programming		**Diff'rent Strokes**	Wheel of Fortune	Texas		The Doctors	Search for Tomorrow	Days of Our Lives		Another World		**CHiPs**		Local/syndicated programming					NBC Nightly News

Notes

- Search for Tomorrow was cancelled by CBS in late 1981, and ended its run on CBS on March 26, 1982. It moved to NBC with its first episode the following Monday, March 29. It is the second instance of a daytime soap opera switching networks, with The Edge of Night first doing-so from CBS to ABC in late 1975.
- ABC had a 6PM (ET)/5PM (CT) feed for World News Tonight, depending on stations' schedule. By Spring 1982 it would be discontinued.

=== Saturday ===
Network		7:00 am	7:30 am	8:00 am	8:30 am	9:00 am	9:30 am	10:00 am	10:30 am	11:00 am	11:30 am	noon	12:30 pm	1:00 pm	1:30 pm	2:00 pm	2:30 pm	3:00 pm	3:30 pm	4:00 pm	4:30 pm	5:00 pm	5:30 pm	6:00 pm	6:30 pm
ABC	Fall	Local and/or syndicated programming		The Super Fun Hour: Super Friends; **Heathcliff & Marmaduke**		The Fonz-**Laverne & Shirley** Hour		The Richie Rich/Scooby-Doo Show and Scrappy Too! / Schoolhouse Rock! (10:56AM)		**Goldie Gold and Action Jack** / Thundarr the Barbarian / Schoolhouse Rock! (11:56AM)		ABC Weekend Special	American Bandstand		ABC Sports and/or local programming									Local news	ABC World News Saturday
ABC	February	Local and/or syndicated programming		Super Friends / Schoolhouse Rock! (8:26AM)	Thundarr the Barbarian / Goldie Gold and Action Jack		Laverne & Shirley in the Army	The Richie Rich/Scooby-Doo Show and Scrappy Too! / Schoolhouse Rock! (10:56AM)		The Fonz and the Happy Days Gang	Heathcliff & Marmaduke	ABC Weekend Special	American Bandstand		ABC Sports and/or local programming									Local news	ABC World News Saturday
CBS	Fall	Local and/or syndicated programming		**The Kwicky Koala Show**	**Trollkins**	The Bugs Bunny/Road Runner Show			The Popeye and Olive Comedy Show	**Blackstar**	The Tarzan/Lone Ranger/Zorro Adventure Hour		The Tom and Jerry Comedy Show (R)	The New Fat Albert Show	30 Minutes	CBS Sports and/or local programming								Local news	CBS Evening News
CBS	December	Local and/or syndicated programming		The Popeye and Olive Comedy Show	The Tarzan/Lone Ranger/Zorro Adventure Hour		The Bugs Bunny/Road Runner Show			The New Fat Albert Show	Blackstar	Trollkins	The Tom and Jerry Comedy Show (R)	The Kwicky Koala Show	30 Minutes	CBS Sports and/or local programming								Local news	CBS Evening News
NBC	Fall	Local and/or syndicated programming	The Flintstone Comedy Show		**The Smurfs**		**The Kid Super Power Hour with Shazam!**		**Space Stars**		**Spider-Man and His Amazing Friends**	The Daffy-Speedy Show	The Bullwinkle Show (R)	NBC Sports and/or local programming										Local news	NBC Nightly News
NBC	December	Local and/or syndicated programming		The Flintstone Comedy Show	**The Smurfs**		**The Kid Super Power Hour with Shazam!**		Spider-Man and His Amazing Friends	Space Stars		The Daffy-Speedy Show	The Bullwinkle Show (R)	NBC Sports and/or local programming										Local news	NBC Nightly News
NBC	Summer	Local and/or syndicated programming		The Flintstone Comedy Show	**The Smurfs**		**The Kid Super Power Hour with Shazam!**		Spider-Man and His Amazing Friends	Space Stars		The Daffy-Speedy Show	**Sport Billy**	NBC Sports and/or local programming										Local news	NBC Nightly News

In the News aired ten times during CBS' Saturday morning shows.

Ask NBC News aired after the credits of NBC's Saturday morning shows except Spider-Man and His Amazing Friends and The Bullwinkle Show.

=== Sunday ===
Network		7:00 am	7:30 am	8:00 am	8:30 am	9:00 am	9:30 am	10:00 am	10:30 am	11:00 am	11:30 am	noon	12:30 pm	1:00 pm	1:30 pm	2:00 pm	2:30 pm	3:00 pm	3:30 pm	4:00 pm	4:30 pm	5:00 pm	5:30 pm	6:00 pm	6:30 pm
ABC	Fall	Local and/or syndicated programming							Kids Are People Too		Animals, Animals, Animals	Issues and Answers	ABC Sports and/or local programming											Local news	ABC World News Sunday
ABC	November	Local and/or syndicated programming							Kids Are People Too		**This Week with David Brinkley**		ABC Sports and/or local programming											Local news	ABC World News Sunday
CBS	Fall	The New Adventures of Mighty Mouse and Heckle & Jeckle (R)	Drak Pack (R)	Local and/or syndicated programming		CBS News Sunday Morning			Local and/or syndicated programming		Face the Nation	Local and/or syndicated programming	The NFL Today	NFL on CBS and/or local programming											
CBS	Mid-winter	The New Adventures of Mighty Mouse and Heckle & Jeckle (R)	Drak Pack (R)	Local and/or syndicated programming		CBS News Sunday Morning			Local and/or syndicated programming		Face the Nation	CBS Sports and/or local programming												Local news	CBS Evening News
NBC	Fall	Local and/or syndicated programming										Meet the Press	NFL '81	NFL on NBC and local programming											
NBC	Mid-winter	Local and/or syndicated programming										Meet the Press	NBC Sports and/or local programming											Local news	NBC Nightly News

== By network ==
=== ABC ===
**Returning series**

- ABC Weekend Special
- ABC World News Tonight
- All My Children
- American Bandstand
- Animals, Animals, Animals
- Family Feud
- The Fonz and the Happy Days Gang
- General Hospital
- Good Morning America
- Heathcliff
- Issues and Answers
- Kids Are People Too
- The Love Boat (reruns)
- One Life to Live
- The Richie Rich/Scooby-Doo Show and Scrappy Too!
- Ryan's Hope
- Schoolhouse Rock!
- Super Friends
- Thundarr the Barbarian

**New series**

- **ABC News This Morning**
- **Goldie Gold and Action Jack**
- **Laverne & Shirley in the Army**
- **This Week with David Brinkley**

**Canceled/Ended**

- The Plasticman/Baby Plas Super Comedy
- Three's Company (reruns)

=== CBS ===
**Returning series**

- 30 Minutes
- Alice (reruns)
- As the World Turns
- The Bugs Bunny/Road Runner Show
- Captain Kangaroo
- CBS Children's Film Festival
- CBS Evening News
- CBS Morning News
- CBS News Sunday Morning
- Drak Pack (reruns)
- Face the Nation
- The New Fat Albert Show
- Guiding Light
- The New Adventures of Mighty Mouse and Heckle & Jeckle (reruns)
- One Day at a Time (reruns)
- The Popeye and Olive Comedy Show
- The Price Is Right
- Search for Tomorrow (moved to NBC)
- Sunrise Semester
- The Tarzan/Lone Ranger/Zorro Adventure Hour
- The Tom and Jerry Comedy Show (reruns)
- The Young and the Restless

**New series**

- **Blackstar**
- **Capitol**
- **The Kwicky Koala Show**
- **Tattletales**
- **Trollkins**

**Canceled/Ended**

- Jason of Star Command (reruns)
- The Jeffersons (reruns)
- The Robonic Stooges (reruns)
- The Skatebirds (reruns)

=== NBC ===
**Returning series**

- Another World
- Blockbusters
- The Bullwinkle Show (reruns)
- The Daffy/Speedy Show
- Days of Our Lives
- The Doctors
- The Flintstone Comedy Show
- Gambit (renamed Las Vegas Gambit)
- Meet the Press
- NBC Nightly News
- Password Plus
- Search for Tomorrow (moved from CBS)
- Texas
- Today
- Wheel of Fortune

**New series**

- **Battlestars**
- **CHiPs** (reruns)
- **Diff'rent Strokes** (reruns)
- **The Kid Super Power Hour with Shazam!**
- **The Regis Philbin Show**
- **The Smurfs**
- **Space Stars**
- **Spider-Man and His Amazing Friends**
- **Sport Billy**

**Canceled/Ended**

- Batman and the Super 7
- Card Sharks
- The Daffy Duck Show
- Godzilla (reruns)
- The Godzilla / Dynomutt Hour (reruns)
- Hong Kong Phooey (reruns)
- The Jetsons (reruns)
- Jonny Quest (reruns)

== See also ==
- 1981-82 United States network television schedule (prime-time)
- 1981-82 United States network television schedule (late night)

== Sources ==
- https://web.archive.org/web/20071015122215/http://curtalliaume.com/abc_day.html
- https://web.archive.org/web/20071015122235/http://curtalliaume.com/cbs_day.html
- https://web.archive.org/web/20071012211242/http://curtalliaume.com/nbc_day.html
