= Search and Rescue (1977 TV series) =

- Starring: Michael J. Reynolds
- No. of episodes: 26

Original release
- Release: 1977 – 1978

Search and Rescue is a 1977–78 family-oriented adventure television series co-produced by the CTV television network in Canada and NBC in the United States. The program was aired in prime time in Canada and on Saturday mornings by NBC. It was later syndicated overseas. The American broadcasts of the series carried the modified title Search and Rescue: The Alpha Team. The show aired on NBC from September 10, 1977 to January 28, 1978.

The series starred Michael J. Reynolds (an actor later known for appearing in many commercials for Nabob coffee) as Dr. Bob Donell, the leader of a unique rescue team that includes his two children Katy (Donann Cavin) and Jim (Michael Tough). What makes the team unique is that it conducts its rescues using a veritable zoo of specially trained animals. Each episode would see the Alpha Team utilizing specific animals to handle specific incidents, ranging from birds to dogs.

A total of 26 episodes were produced, although the American broadcast of the series was cancelled after thirteen episodes.
