= 1959–60 United States network television schedule (late night) =

These are the late-night Monday–Friday schedules for the three networks for the 1959–60 season. All times are Eastern and Pacific.

Talk shows are highlighted in yellow, local programming is white.

Jack Paar's late night show on NBC was 1 hour and 45 minutes long. In May 1959, NBC announced that it would allow Paar to transition from a five-show-a-week schedule to just four nights a week; the fifth night would feature taped re-runs and billed The Best of Jack Paar.

On February 10, 1960, Paar said he was quitting and walked off-stage in front of a studio audience while taping.

== Schedule ==
	11:00 PM	11:30 PM	12:00 AM	12:30 AM	1:00 AM	1:30 AM	2:00 AM	2:30 AM	3:00 AM	3:30 AM	4:00 AM	4:30 PM	5:00 AM	5:30 AM
ABC	local programming or sign-off
CBS	local programming or sign-off
NBC	11:15 PM: The Jack Paar Show/The Best Of Paar (F)				local programming or sign-off
