= 1960–61 United States network television schedule (late night) =

These are the late-night Monday–Friday schedules for all three networks for the 1960–61 season. All times are Eastern and Pacific.

Talk shows are highlighted in yellow, local programming is white.

In September 1960, The Jack Paar Show was broadcast in color for the first time, as NBC expanded its color television programming. It was host Jack Paar's fourth season of late-night television. The show aired from 11:15 PM to 1:00 AM New York Time.

== Schedule ==
	11:00 PM	11:30 PM	12:00 AM	12:30 AM	1:00 AM	1:30 AM	2:00 AM	2:30 AM	3:00 AM	3:30 AM	4:00 AM	4:30 PM	5:00 AM	5:30 AM
ABC	local programming or sign-off
CBS	local programming or sign-off
NBC	11:15 PM: The Jack Paar Show/The Best Of Paar (F)				local programming or sign-off

== By network ==
=== NBC ===
Returning Series

- The Jack Paar Show
- The Best Of Paar
