= 1958–59 United States network television schedule (late night) =

These are the late-night Monday–Friday schedules for all three networks for the 1958–59 season. All times are Eastern and Pacific.

Talk shows are highlighted in yellow, local programming is white.

== Schedule ==
		11:00 PM	11:30 PM	12:00 AM	12:30 AM	1:00 AM	1:30 AM	2:00 AM	2:30 AM	3:00 AM	3:30 AM	4:00 AM	4:30 PM	5:00 AM	5:30 AM
ABC		local programming or sign-off
CBS		local programming or sign-off
NBC	Fall	11:15 PM: The Jack Paar Show+				local programming or sign-off
NBC	July	11:15 PM: The Jack Paar Show/The Best Of Paar* (F)				local programming or sign-off

+ formerly The Tonight Show.

- Beginning on July 10, 1959, the Friday night shows were repeats of previous shows.

== Sources ==
- Castleman & Podrazik, The TV Schedule Book, McGraw-Hill Paperbacks, 1984
- Brooks & Marsh, The Complete Directory To Prime-Time Network TV Shows, Ballantine, 1984
- TV schedules, The New York Times, September 1958–September 1959 (microfilm)
