= 1977–78 United States network television schedule (late night) =

These are the late-night schedules for the three U.S. television networks during the 1977–78 season. All times are Eastern and Pacific.

PBS is not included, as member television stations had local flexibility with most of their schedules, and broadcast times for network shows might have varied. However, this was the first season of the half-hour PBS version of The Dick Cavett Show which started on October 10, 1977 and continued through 1982. ABC and CBS are not included on the weekend schedules because those networks did not offer late-night programming on the weekend.

Talk/Variety shows are highlighted in yellow, Local News & Programs are highlighted in white.

== Monday-Friday ==
-	11:00 PM	11:30 PM	12:00 AM	12:30 AM	1:00 AM	1:30 AM	2:00 AM	2:30 AM	3:00 AM	3:30 AM	4:00 AM	4:30 AM	5:00 AM	5:30 AM
ABC	Local	ABC Late Night										Local programming or sign-off
CBS	local programming	The CBS Late Movie				Local programming or sign-off
NBC	local programming	The Tonight Show Starring Johnny Carson			The Tomorrow Show (to 2:00; Mon.-Thur.)/The Midnight Special (Fri)			local programming or sign-off

== Saturday ==
-	11:00 PM	11:30 PM	12:00 AM	12:30 AM	1:00 AM	1:30 AM	2:00 AM	2:30 AM	3:00 AM	3:30 AM	4:00 AM	4:30 AM	5:00 AM	5:30 AM
NBC	local programming	Weekend / Saturday Night Live			local programming or sign-off

== Sunday ==
-	11:00 PM	11:30 PM	12:00 AM	12:30 AM	1:00 AM	1:30 AM	2:00 AM	2:30 AM	3:00 AM	3:30 AM	4:00 AM	4:30 AM	5:00 AM	5:30 AM
NBC	local programming	NBC Late Night Movie				local programming or sign-off

== By network ==
=== ABC ===
Returning Series

- ABC Late Night

=== CBS ===
Returning Series

- The CBS Late Movie

=== NBC ===
Returning Series

- The Midnight Special
- NBC Late Night Movie
- Saturday Night Live
- The Tomorrow Show
- The Tonight Show Starring Johnny Carson
- Weekend
