= 1972–73 United States network television schedule (late night) =

These are the late-night schedules for the three television networks during the 1972–73 season. All times are Eastern and Pacific.

PBS is not included, as member television stations had local flexibility over most of their schedules, and broadcast times for network shows might have varied. ABC and CBS are not included on the weekend schedules because those networks did not offer late-night programs of any kind on the weekend.

Talk/Variety shows are highlighted in yellow, Local News & Programs are highlighted in white.

== Monday-Friday ==
-		11:00 PM	11:30 PM	12:00 AM	12:30 AM	1:00 AM	1:30 AM	2:00 AM	2:30 AM	3:00 AM	3:30 AM	4:00 AM	4:30 AM	5:00 AM	5:30 AM
ABC	Fall	Local programming	The Dick Cavett Show			Local programming or sign-off
ABC	Winter	Local programming	ABC's Wide World of Entertainment			Local programming or sign-off
CBS		local programming	The CBS Late Movie				Local programming or sign-off
NBC	Fall	local programming	The Tonight Show Starring Johnny Carson			local programming or sign-off
NBC	February	local programming	The Tonight Show Starring Johnny Carson			The Midnight Special (Fri)			local programming or sign-off

== Saturday/Sunday ==
-	11:00 PM	11:30 PM	12:00 AM	12:30 AM	1:00 AM	1:30 AM	2:00 AM	2:30 AM	3:00 AM	3:30 AM	4:00 AM	4:30 AM	5:00 AM	5:30 AM
NBC	local programming	The Weekend Tonight Show			local programming or sign-off

== By network ==
=== ABC ===
Returning Series

- The Dick Cavett Show

New Series

- ABC's Wide World of Entertainment

=== CBS ===
Returning Series

- The CBS Late Movie

Not returning from 1971-72

- The Merv Griffin Show

=== NBC ===
Returning Series

- The Tonight Show Starring Johnny Carson
- The Weekend Tonight Show

New Series

- The Midnight Special
