= Watch Mr. Wizard =

Television series

- Genre: Science education
- Starring: Don Herbert
- Country of origin: United States
- No. of episodes: 547

Production
- Production locations: Chicago, Illinois (1951–1955); New York City (1955–1965)
- Running time: 30 minutes

Original release
- Network: NBC
- Release: March 3, 1951 – June 27, 1965

Watch Mr. Wizard is an American children's television series that demonstrates the science behind ordinary things. The series' creator and on-air host was Don Herbert. Author Marcel LaFollette says of the program, "It enjoyed consistent praise, awards, and high ratings throughout its history. At its peak, Watch Mr. Wizard drew audiences in the millions, but its impact was far wider. By 1956, it had prompted the establishment of more than five thousand Mr. Wizard science clubs, with an estimated membership greater than one hundred thousand."

It was briefly revived in 1971, and a third version of the show ran during the 1980s on the children's cable television network Nickelodeon as Mr. Wizard's World.

== 1951–1965: Original series ==
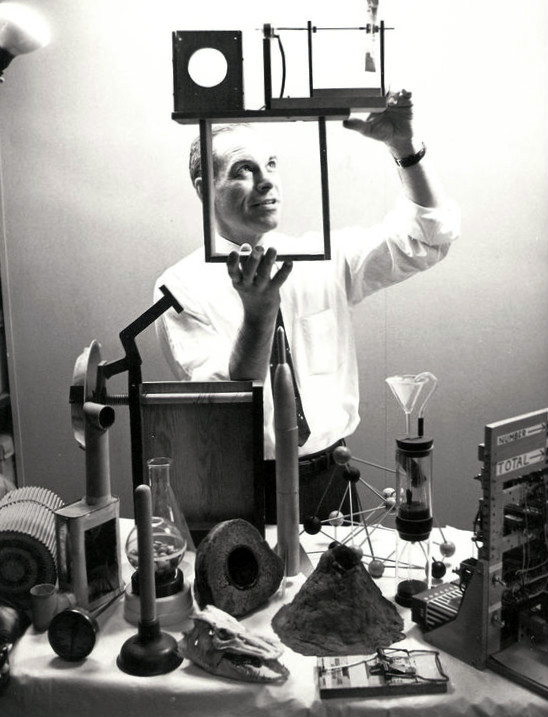
Herbert in 1961

Watch Mr. Wizard first aired on NBC on March 3, 1951, with Don Herbert as the title character. In the weekly half-hour live television show, Herbert played a science hobbyist and every Saturday morning a neighbor would come to visit. The children were played by child actors; one of them (Rita McLaughlin) enjoyed a long subsequent acting career. Mr. Wizard always had some kind of laboratory experiment going that taught something about science. The experiments, many of which seemed impossible at first glance, were usually simple enough to be re-created by viewers.

The show was very successful; by 1954 it was broadcast live by 14 stations, and by kinescope (a film made from the television monitor of the original live broadcast) by an additional 77. Mr. Wizard Science Clubs were started throughout North America, numbering 5,000 by 1955 and 50,000 by 1965. The show moved from Chicago to New York on September 5, 1955, and had produced 547 live broadcasts by the time the show was canceled in 1965. The show was cited by the National Science Foundation and American Chemical Society for increasing interest in science and won a 1953 Peabody Award.

Thirty-two episodes of Watch Mr. Wizard were selected by Herbert and released on eight DVDs.

== 1971: Canadian-produced revival ==
The series was revived by NBC from September 11, 1971, through September 2, 1972, as Mr. Wizard, and aired 26 episodes produced in color in Ottawa, Ontario, at the studios of CTV outlet CJOH-TV. The series was legally considered Canadian content, despite the American origins of the series and its host. CBC Television carried these episodes within Canada.

== 1983–1989: Mr. Wizard's World ==
Mr. Wizard's World
- Genre: Science education
- Starring: Don Herbert
- Composers: Paul Zaza (1983–1985); New York Sound (1985–1989)
- Countries of origin: Canada; United States
- No. of seasons: 5
- No. of episodes: 78

Production
- Producer: Fern Field
- Production locations: Calgary, Alberta, Canada
- Running time: 30 minutes

Original release
- Network: Nickelodeon (1983–1989)
- Release: October 3, 1983 – July 21, 1989

Related
- Watch Mr. Wizard

Mr. Wizard's World, a faster-paced version of the show, was shown three times a week on Nickelodeon, the then-rising kids cable channel. Once again, the revival was produced in Canada (this time in Calgary). It produced 78 episodes from 1983 onwards, and continued to run thereafter as reruns. During its run on Nickelodeon, it was the channel's #3 rated show in 1983 (behind Livewire and You Can't Do That on Television). It was also famous for its Ask Mr. Wizard segment where Herbert answered questions sent in by viewers of all ages. Episodes of this version of the show were reaired in 2005–06 on the digital cable channel The Science Channel.

Herbert once said: "My time on this Earth is getting shorter and shorter each day, but no matter how old I get, and even when I am dead, Mr. Wizard's World will never die". It was canceled in 1989, though reruns continued on Nick at Nite until 1995 and often in early morning time slots right after Nick at Nite finished (usually as part of Cable in the Classroom) until August 2000. In 1994, Herbert developed another new series of 15-minute spots called Teacher to Teacher with Mr. Wizard. They highlighted individual elementary science teachers and their projects. The series was sponsored by the National Science Foundation.

Selected episodes of Mr. Wizard's World are available on DVD from Mr. Wizard Studios Inc. in ten single volumes featuring four episodes on each disc. Gift box-sets are also available. Five seasons of the show, 75 episodes of the 78 total were released on Amazon instant streaming. These episodes are also available through Vudu and can be streamed for free with ads or rented for a fee. Paramount Global, the parent company of Nickelodeon, has also added the series to its Pluto TV service. The shows are also on iTunes and Crackle now.

Segments on Mr. Wizard's World included:

- Everyday Magic
- Supermarket Science
- Oddity
- What's This?
- Quick Quiz
- How It Works
- Snapshot
- Safari
- New Frontiers
- Know Your Body
- Close-Ups
- Challenge

== In popular culture ==
- In six episodes of The Big Bang Theory, the characters meet a retired TV scientist based on Mr. Wizard named Professor Proton (played by Bob Newhart).
