= CBS Children's Film Festival =

Film showcase series

CBS Children's Film Festival (also known as CBS Children's Hour) is a 1967–1984 television series of live action films from several countries that were made for children (several of them dubbed into English). Originally a sporadic series airing on Saturday mornings, Sunday afternoons, or weekday afternoons beginning in February 1967, it became a regularly scheduled program in 1971 on the CBS Saturday-morning lineup, running one hour with some films apparently edited down to fit the time slot. The program was hosted by 1950s television act Kukla, Fran and Ollie, a.k.a. puppeteer Burr Tillstrom and actress Fran Allison.

Kukla, Fran and Ollie were dropped from the series in 1977 and the program was renamed CBS Saturday Film Festival. In 1978 CBS canceled the show in favor of the youth-targeted magazine 30 Minutes which was modeled after its adult sister show 60 Minutes. CBS canceled 30 Minutes in 1982 and brought back Saturday Film Festival which ran for two seasons until CBS cancelled it for good in 1984.

Perhaps the most famous "episode" of the series was the 1960 British film Hand in Hand, the story of a deep friendship between two elementary school students, one a Roman Catholic boy and the other a Jewish girl.

In addition to many American and British films, the series also featured motion pictures from Russia, France, Bulgaria, Japan, Sweden, Italy, China, Australia, South Africa, and Czechoslovakia, as well as several other countries.

Other films that aired during the series run include the Academy Award-winning French film The Red Balloon; Skinny and Fatty from Japan; Digby, the Biggest Dog in the World from Great Britain; Tillie, the Unhappy Hippopotamus from Czechoslovakia; and Mi-Mi, the Lazy Kitten from China.

Actor Ray Bolger, a star of The Wizard of Oz, served as narrator for some of the episodes during the show's 1980s run.

Joel Hodgson of Mystery Science Theater 3000 fame stated that the characters of Kukla, Fran and Ollie were an early influence on his show.

== Films ==
Following is a partial list of films aired on the program:

- Adventure in Golden Bay – Czech, 1956
- Adventure in the Hopfields – British, 1954
- Angel and Big Joe – American, 1975
- Anoop and the Elephant – British, 1972
- Bag on Bag – Soviet, 1974
- A Bird of Africa – Japanese, 1975
- Birds Come Flying To Us – Bulgarian, 1971
- Black Mountain – Soviet, 1970
- The Blind Bird – Soviet, 1963
- The Boy and the Airplane – French, 1965
- The Boy Who Owned a Melephant – American, 1959
- The Boy Who Wore Spectacles – Soviet, ?
- The Boy With Glasses – Japanese, 1962
- Bunnie – Polish, 1973
- The Camerons – Australian, 1974
- Captain Korda – Czech, 1970
- Captain Mikula, the Kid – Yugoslavian, 1974
- Carole, I Love You – French, 1971
- Charlie the Rascal – Swedish, 1972
- Chimpmates – British, 1976
- The Chiffy Kids – British, 1976
- Circus Adventure – Dutch, 1972
- Circus Angel – French, 1965
- Clown – Spanish, 1969
- Cold Pizza – Canadian, 1972
- Countdown to Danger – British, 1967
- Cry Wolf – British, 1968
- Danger Point – British, 1971
- Death of a Gandy Dancer – Canadian, 1977
- Digby, the Biggest Dog in the World – British, 1973
- Doggie and Three – Czech, 1955
- Egghead's Robot – British, 1970
- Elephant River – Ceylon, 1956
- Felipa: North of the Border – American, 1971
- The Firefighters – British, 1975
- Flash the Sheepdog – British, 1966
- Fly Away Dove – American, 1982
- The Flying Sorcerer – British, 1973
- For Boys Only Is For Girls, Also – Czech, 1964
- A Friend – Italian, 1967
- Friend or Foe – British, 1969
- Friends for Life – Soviet, 1971
- Funny Stories – Soviet, 1962
- Geronimo Jones – American, 1970
- Get Used to Me – American, 1976
- Ghost of a Chance – British, 1968
- The Giant Eel – Czech, 1971
- Glamador – French, 1955
- The Goalkeeper Also Lives on Our Street – Czech, 1957
- The Golden Fish – French, 1959
- Gosha the Bear – Soviet, 1971
- Hand in Hand – British, 1960
- Headline Hunters – British, 1967
- Heidi – German/Austrian, 1965
- J.T. (1969) (Note: J.T. was so critically acclaimed as a Saturday-morning entry, it was rebroadcast in Prime Time by CBS several times over the next decade.)
- Joey – American, 1978
- John and Julie – British, 1954
- The Johnstown Monster – British, 1971
- Jumping Over Puddles – Czech, 1970
- The Legend of John Henry – American, 1974
- The Legend of Paul Bunyan – American, 1973
- Lionheart – British, 1968
- The Little Bearkeepers – Czech, 1957
- The Little Ones – British, 1965
- Little Pig – Hong Kong, 1976
- The Little Wooden Horse – French, 1966
- Lone Wolf – Yugoslavian, 1972
- Lost in Pajamas – Czech, 1966
- Lucy and the Miracles – Czech, 1970
- The Magnificent 6-1/2 – British, 1967
- Mauro the Gypsy – British, 1972
- Me and You, Kangaroo – Australian, 1974
- A Member of the Family – British, 1971
- Miguel's Navidad – Mexico, 1976
- Miguel: Up From Puerto Rico – American, 1970
- Mischief – British, 1968
- Mr. Horatio Knibbles – British, 1971
- My Father, Sun-Sun Johnson – Jamaican, 1976
- My Main Man – American, 1975
- Nikkolina – Canadian, 1977
- Nina and the Street Kids – Swedish, 1974
- Nunu and the Zebra – South African, 1973
- On Snow White – Czech, 1972
- The Orange Watering Cart – Hungarian, ?1973
- Paddle to the Sea – Canadian, 1966
- Paganini Strikes Again – British, 1974
- Pero and His Companions – Yugoslavia, 1970
- The Promise – American, 1977
- The Ransom of Red Chief – Soviet, 1963
- The Red Balloon – French, 1956
- Scramble – British, 1969
- A Seafaring Dog – Soviet, 1973
- The Secret – American, 1977
- The Seven Ravens – German, 1937
- Shok and Sher – Soviet, ?
- Shopping Bag Lady – American, 1975
- The Show Must Go On – Soviet, ?
- Six Bears and a Clown – Czech, 1972
- Sirius – Czech, 1974
- Skinny and Fatty – Japanese, 1959
- Soapbox Derby – Canadian, ?
- Stowaway in the Sky – French, 1959
- Strange Holiday – Australian, 1969
- That's My Name, Don't Wear It Out – British, 1975
- Three Wishes for Cinderella – Czech, 1973
- Thunderstorm – French, ?
- Ticko – Swedish, ?
- Tiko and the Shark – Italian/French, 1965
- Tjorven, Batsman, and Moses – Swedish, 1964
- Tony and the Tick-Tock Dragon – Hungarian, ?
- Turniphead – Italian, 1965
- Tymancha's Friend – Soviet, 1970
- Up in the Air – British, 1969
- The Violin – Canadian, 1974
- What Next? – British, 1974
- Where's Johnny? – British, 1974
- White Mane – French, 1952
- Winter of the Witch – British, 1969
- The Yellow Slippers – Polish, 1961
