= Look Up and Live =

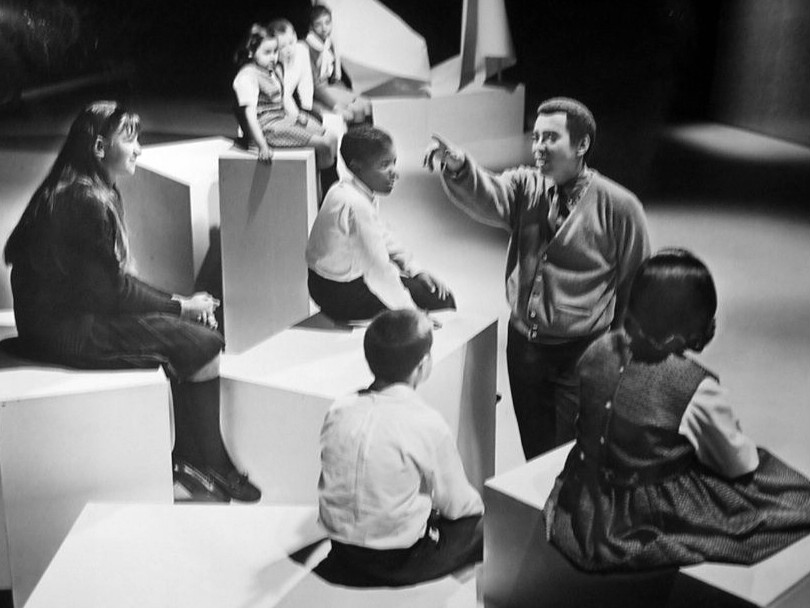
- Oscar Brown performing on Look Up and Live, 1965

Production
- Production companies: CBS News; National Council of Churches

Original release
- Network: CBS
- Release: January 3, 1954 – January 21, 1979

Look Up and Live is a 30-minute television anthology series. The series was produced in cooperation with the National Council of Churches and aired on CBS from January 3, 1954 to January 21, 1979. It was a non-denominational Sunday morning religious show that covered issues from multiple perspectives, avoiding heavy proselytizing. The series' success in reaching young people with inspirational messages was due partially to the contemporary musicians and celebrities featured on the show.

The show's first host was evangelist Charles Templeton, who hosted for three years, the last with Merv Griffin as co-host, before leaving in 1957 when his growing doubts about Christianity caused him to quit the ministry and become an agnostic.

In 1960, Look Up and Live received the Peabody Award. At that time, Reverend Andrew Young was a host of the series. Young, who would later become a top aide to Martin Luther King, Jr., was associate director of the Department of Youth Work for the National Council of Churches from 1957 to 1960. His duties included working on Look Up and Live, both in front of and behind the camera. Young has said that the knowledge of television he gained during his time working on the series enabled him to advise Dr. King on media strategy.

There were a number of other narrators and hosts over the years, including Mahalia Jackson, Eddie Fisher, Eydie Gormé, and Ed Sullivan. Guest stars included Gene Hackman, Oscar Brown, Dick Van Dyke, James Earl Jones, Bennye Gatteys, Jack Klugman, Beatrice Straight, Sal Mineo, Billy Dee Williams, Theodore Bikel, Ossie Davis, Ruby Dee, and, in two of his earliest performances, Warren Beatty. John M. Gunn edited six plays that were turned into episodes of the show.

In 1979, Look Up and Live and Lamp Unto My Feet, both of which were cancelled earlier that year, along with Camera Three, to make room for CBS News Sunday Morning, were combined into a new series called For Our Times, a weekly religious talk show which aired until 1988.

Some episodes of Look Up and Live are preserved at the Paley Center for Media in New York City and in the Peabody Awards archive at the University of Georgia.

== Critical response ==
A review in The New York Times said that the December 7, 1958, episode "offered an attractive example of the use of original devices in a religious telecast". The review said, "The combination of imaginative choreography ..., interesting musical passages and effective settings made an unusual and absorbing presentation."
