= Lamp Unto My Feet =

- Genre: Religious anthology
- Country of origin: United States
- Original language: English

Production
- Camera setup: Single-camera
- Running time: 60 minutes

Original release
- Network: CBS Television
- Release: 21 November 1948 – 21 January 1979

Lamp Unto My Feet is an American ecumenical religious program that was produced by CBS Television and broadcast from November 21, 1948, to January 21, 1979, on Sunday mornings. The title comes from Psalm 119: "Thy word is a lamp unto my feet, and a light unto my path."

== Overview ==
The program used a combination of drama, music, and dance to explore the histories, cultures and theological philosophies of the Protestant, Catholic and Jewish faiths. Most episodes in later seasons followed a reality-based documentary format, featuring various faith-based organizations and figures; a 1969 installment profiled the Lend-A-Hand Center in Knox County, Kentucky, and a 1970 installment featured Elizabeth Platz, the first woman in North America ordained by a Lutheran church body.

In 1979 this program and another long-running CBS religious series, Look Up and Live, were combined to form a new show called For Our Times (April 28, 1979 to 1988), sponsored by the National Council of Churches, New York Board of Rabbis, and U.S. Conference of Catholic Bishops.

The introduction was a simple voice-over, proclaiming "It is better to light one candle, than to curse the darkness," while a candle was being lit in a dark room.

== Guest stars ==
Notable guest stars included Mahalia Jackson, Kim Hunter, Luther Adler, Edward Mulhare, Arthur Hill, Beatrice Straight, Eydie Gorme, The Ink Spots, and Aline MacMahon.

== Production ==
Producers of the series included Isabelle Redman and Pamela Ilott.
