= Sunrise Semester =

American distance learning television series (1957 – 1982)

- Genre: Educational; Telecourse
- Country of origin: United States
- Original language: English
- No. of seasons: 25
- No. of episodes: 800+

Production
- Production locations: New York City; New York University
- Camera setup: Multi-camera
- Running time: 30 minutes
- Production company: CBS

Original release
- Network: CBS
- Release: September 9, 1957 – October 1, 1982

Sunrise Semester is an American educational television series that aired on WCBS-TV from September 1957 to October 1982 and was at first syndicated by CBS Television Film Sales. It was produced in conjunction with the College of Arts and Science at New York University (when the program started, the Washington Square and University College of Arts and Science). During June, July and August, the program was known as Summer Semester. It was one of the first examples of distance learning, telecourses, or MOOCs (massive open online courses). Lecturers presented NYU credit courses in studio on a wide range of academic subjects, and these broadcast courses were offered for credit to anyone who paid the course fees. The program earned five Emmy Awards during its lifetime.

The program was so named because it was broadcast in the early morning, in New York at 6:30 a.m.

== History and production ==
Sunrise Semester was developed by Warren A. Kraetzer, director of the Office of Radio/Television at New York University, and Sam Cook Digges, general manager of WCBS-TV, and started on WCBS before becoming a syndicated program. Thomas Brophy, assistant director under Kraetzer, was the administrator of the program until his retirement in 1973, when he was succeeded by Pat Myers. New York University planned the courses and provided faculty; beginning in 1963, CBS taped and distributed it to network affiliates. The first course was Comparative Literature 10: From Stendhal to Hemingway, taught by Floyd Zulli, Jr., an Assistant Professor of Romance Languages. Neil Postman taught a course, Communication, The Invisible Environment, in the Fall of 1976.

After a preview broadcast at 3:30 p.m. on Saturday, September 7, 1957, the program premiered on Monday, September 23, 1957 at 6:30 a.m. in New York and aired at varying early times between 5:30 and 7:30 a.m. elsewhere. It consisted of two courses per semester on alternating days from Monday through Saturday, each broadcast half an hour long (90–95 hours a year). Initially these were broadcast live, requiring a 4:30 a.m. makeup call for the lecturer. After adoption by the CBS network, the three lectures for each course were taped in a single weekly session, between 11:15 a.m. and 3:00 p.m. The setting was an unadorned lecture room, with a chalkboard and a projector. There was no editing and no provision for retakes; Myers said she advised professors who made "a horrendous goof" to "faint". Payments to the instructors were too low to permit rebroadcasting or the sale of tapes under union regulations: initially instructors received $25 per broadcast. NYU students at first paid a $75 fee to receive undergraduate credit for one of the courses; by 1974 this had risen to $250. Other institutions were free to use the program for their own credit courses, without payment to NYU. Beginning in 1971, NYU also allowed high-school students to take the course for credit before enrolling in the university. A primary source of funding was a grant from the Sperry and Hutchinson Foundation.

During the summer, the program was titled Summer Semester and courses were non-credit; from 1962 Rutgers University produced summer courses.

In a December 1958 article, John Crosby reported that most viewers of Sunrise Semester were women between 16 and 60. In the early years, NYU held a social event at which registered students could meet their instructor. There were plans in the early 1980s to improve the production values of the program, but CBS canceled it in 1982 to make way for early-morning news. At that time, according to the network, only 42 affiliates carried the program.

== Awards and reception ==
Sunrise Semester won five Emmy Awards in its first two years.

Zulli's first course, viewable only in New York, had 74,000 viewers in the first week, 120,000 by the end of the semester. 150 students enrolled for credit, and bookstores sold out of Stendhal's The Red and the Black. Jack Gould in The New York Times called it "a refreshing and civilized hit" and praised the instructor's "[lack of] condescension" and "carefully controlled ...theatrical[ity]". In the mid-1970s, 85 CBS stations were carrying the broadcast, and NYU believed there were up to a million viewers. Variety called Zulli's course "the first unquestioned hit show of the 1957 television season". CBS did not permit advertising during the program, but the slots before and after it were popular with advertisers.

Sunrise Semester has been described as "a kind of primitive form of a ... MOOC"; in 1962 The New York Times ran a featured article on a housewife who had completed a bachelor's degree at NYU including 54 out of 128 credits from Sunrise Semester courses. Sunrise Semester was cited in a 2021 article in the Smithsonian magazine as setting the stage for widespread distance learning during the COVID-19 pandemic.

== See also ==
- Continental Classroom
