= Camera Three =

American anthology television series (1956–1980)

- Genre: Anthology
- Written by: Lonne Elder III; Stephan Chodorov
- Directed by: Ivan Cury; Merrill Brockway; John Musilli
- Presented by: James Macandrew
- Country of origin: United States
- Original language: English
- No. of episodes: 248

Production
- Running time: 45 minutes
- Production company: CBS Productions

Original release
- Network: CBS (1956-1979); PBS (1979-1980)
- Release: January 22, 1956 – July 10, 1980

Camera Three is an American anthology television series devoted to the arts. It began as a Sunday afternoon local program on WCBS-TV in New York in 1954 and ran "for some time" before moving to the network on CBS at 11:30 a.m. Eastern time. It aired from January 22, 1956, to January 21, 1979, and then moved to PBS in its final year to make way for the then-new CBS News Sunday Morning, which incorporated regular segments devoted to the arts. The PBS version ran from October 4, 1979, to July 10, 1980.

Camera Three featured programs showcasing drama, ballet, art, music, anything involving fine arts. The first network presentation was a dramatization of Feodor Dostoevsky's short story "The Drama of a Ridiculous Man", with Canadian actor John Drainie as the "ridiculous man", and directed by Francis Moriarty.

Said media columnist Charles Mercer of the initial network broadcast, "The concept of Camera Three, as aptly expressed by its moderator James Macandrew, is that ‘television is more than an engineering miracle.' In the past, it has revealed the artistic dimensions of the medium in multipart dramatizations of Moby Dick, The Red Badge of Courage and Crime and Punishment. Unquestionably it will go on to do similar superior works."

One of its most notable presentations was a condensation of Marc Blitzstein's leftist opera The Cradle Will Rock. Presented on November 29, 1964, it was a dramatic demonstration of how far television had come since its early days, in its willingness to present a work that surely would have been banned from the airwaves during the era of Joseph McCarthy.

== Beginning ==
Camera Three originated as a Saturday afternoon cultural affairs program on WCBS-TV. Robert Herridge, who was producing a low-rated educational series, It's Worth Knowing, for the station approached WCBS-TV's head of public affairs, Clarence Worden, with his idea for "a program where there was no area of human experience we couldn't get into ... an open end kind of show -- an open sesame." Worden signed off on the idea and gave Herridge 45 minutes of time on Saturday afternoons and a $1,400 budget.

The program's name stemmed from a question Worden asked Herridge: "How many cameras are you using?" After Herridge replied "Three," Worden suggested that Camera Three would make "a great title."

Camera Three continued to be produced by WCBS-TV's public affairs department when it moved to the network, but by the early 1960s its budget had been increased to $5,000 a week.

== Successes and failures ==
Camera Three is recognized as being the first TV program "to use poetry extensively" and the first "to succeed with dramatizations of classics." The program also broke ground in sensitive areas, such as presenting a sympathetic portrayal of Sacco and Vanzetti and casting a black actor, Earle Hyman, in the role of Othello, rather than having the role played by a white actor in blackface, as was the usual custom at that time.

It aired a special episode on Sojourner Truth in 1966. Pioneer African-American actress Paulene Myers performed a one-woman show incorporating famous addresses and quotations, including Ain't I a Woman?

Noteworthy guests on the program included Buddy Guy, Son House, Alan Watts, Richard Burton, Melissa Hayden, Carlos Montoya, Agnes Moorehead, Ogden Nash, Nina Simone, Katherine Anne Porter, Christopher Plummer, Thornton Wilder, and Rosalyn Tureck.

During Clare Roskam's tenure as producer of the show, he did an episode that focused on the work of Salvador Dalí and purposely omitted an interview with the painter. After the program aired, Dalí phoned Roskam and left a terse message, "I'm not dead, you know!"

While the show was the recipient of several awards, including the Sylvania, the Peabody and the Emmy, not all its innovations succeeded. An episode consisting of a recording of Bach's Goldberg Variations against images of a harpsichord and a piano was "disastrous," according to Roskam. The attempt to adapt Isak Dinesen's Deluge at Norderney resulted in "a deadeningly talky" episode dismissed by WCBS-TV program director Dan Gallagher as "a real failure."
