= 1961–62 United States network television schedule (daytime) =

The following is the 1961–62 daytime network television schedule for the three major English-language commercial broadcast networks in the United States. It covers the weekday daytime hours from September 1961 to August 1962.

Talk shows are highlighted in yellow, local programming is white, reruns of prime-time programming are orange, game shows are pink, soap operas are chartreuse, news programs are gold and all others are light blue. New series are highlighted in bold.

== Monday-Friday ==
Network		6:00 am	6:30 am	7:00 am	7:30 am	8:00 am	8:30 am	9:00 am	9:30 am	10:00 am	10:30 am	11:00 am	11:30 am	noon	12:30 pm	1:00 pm	1:30 pm	2:00 pm	2:30 pm	3:00 pm	3:30 pm	4:00 pm	4:30 pm	5:00 pm	5:30 pm	6:00 pm	6:30 pm
ABC	Fall	local										The Texan (R)	Love that Bob (R) (to 12/1)	Camouflage	**Make a Face**	Day in Court	local	Number Please	Seven Keys	Queen for a Day	Who Do You Trust?	4:00 pm: American Bandstand 4:50 pm: **American Newsstand**		local		ABC Evening Report 6:15: local	local
ABC	December	local										The Texan (R)	**Yours for a Song** (from 12/4)	Camouflage	**Make a Face**	Day in Court	local	Number Please	Seven Keys	Queen for a Day	Who Do You Trust?	4:00 pm: American Bandstand 4:50 pm: **American Newsstand**		local		ABC Evening Report 6:15: local	local
ABC	Winter	local										The Texan (R)	**Yours for a Song** (from 12/4)	Camouflage	**Make a Face**	local		Day in Court	Seven Keys	Queen for a Day	Who Do You Trust?	4:00 pm: American Bandstand 4:50 pm: **American Newsstand**		local		ABC Evening Report 6:15: local	local
ABC	Spring	local										**The Tennessee Ernie Ford Show**	**Yours for a Song** (from 12/4)	Camouflage	**Window Shopping**	The Texan (R) (to 5/11)	local	Day in Court	Seven Keys	Queen for a Day	Who Do You Trust?	4:00 pm: American Bandstand 4:50 pm: **American Newsstand**		local		ABC Evening Report 6:15: local	local
ABC	May	local										**The Tennessee Ernie Ford Show**	**Yours for a Song** (from 12/4)	Camouflage	**Window Shopping**	local		Day in Court	Seven Keys	Queen for a Day	Who Do You Trust?	4:00 pm: American Bandstand 4:50 pm: **American Newsstand**		local		ABC Evening Report 6:15: local	local
ABC	Summer	local										**The Tennessee Ernie Ford Show**	**Yours for a Song** (from 12/4)	Camouflage	Jane Wyman Presents (R)	local		Day in Court	Seven Keys	Queen for a Day	Who Do You Trust?	4:00 pm: American Bandstand 4:50 pm: **American Newsstand**		local		ABC Evening Report 6:15: local	local
CBS	Fall	local				Captain Kangaroo		local		**Calendar**	I Love Lucy (R)	Video Village	11:30 am: Your Surprise Package (to 2/23) & 11:55 am: CBS Newsbreak with Rose Marie Scott	Love of Life	12:30 pm: Search for Tomorrow 12:45 pm: The Guiding Light	local	As the World Turns	**Password**	Art Linkletter's House Party	The Millionaire (R)	3:30 pm: The Verdict is Yours 3:55 pm: CBS Newsbreak with Rose Marie Scott	4:00 pm: The Brighter Day 4:15 pm: The Secret Storm	The Edge of Night	local			
CBS	February	local				Captain Kangaroo		local		**Calendar**	I Love Lucy (R)	Video Village	11:30 am: The Clear Horizon (from 2/26) & 11:55 am: CBS Newsbreak with Rose Marie Scott	Love of Life	12:30 pm: Search for Tomorrow 12:45 pm: The Guiding Light	local	As the World Turns	**Password**	Art Linkletter's House Party	The Millionaire (R)	3:30 pm: The Verdict is Yours 3:55 pm: CBS Newsbreak with Rose Marie Scott	4:00 pm: The Brighter Day 4:15 pm: The Secret Storm	The Edge of Night	local			
CBS	June	local				Captain Kangaroo		local		**Calendar**	I Love Lucy (R)	The Verdict is Yours	11:30 am: The Brighter Day & 11:55 am: CBS Newsbreak with Rose Marie Scott	Love of Life	12:30 pm: Search for Tomorrow 12:45 pm: The Guiding Light	local	As the World Turns	**Password**	Art Linkletter's House Party	The Millionaire (R)	3:30 pm: **To Tell the Truth** 3:55 pm: CBS Newsbreak with Rose Marie Scott''	The Secret Storm	The Edge of Night	local			
NBC	Fall	Continental Classroom		Today				local		Say When!!	Play Your Hunch In COLOR	The Price Is Right In COLOR	Concentration	Truth or Consequences	12:30 pm: It Could Be You In COLOR 12:55 pm: NBC News	local		The Jan Murray Show In COLOR	The Loretta Young Theater (R)	Young Doctor Malone	From These Roots	Make Room for Daddy (R)	4:30 pm: Here's Hollywood 4:55 pm: NBC News	5:00 pm: **Kukla, Fran and Ollie** 5:05 pm: local	local		
NBC	Winter	Continental Classroom		Today				local		Say When!!	Play Your Hunch In COLOR	The Price Is Right In COLOR	Concentration	**Your First Impression** In COLOR	12:30 pm: Truth or Consequences 12:55 pm: NBC News	local		The Jan Murray Show In COLOR	The Loretta Young Theater (R)	Young Doctor Malone	**Our Five Daughters**	Make Room for Daddy (R)	4:30 pm: Here's Hollywood 4:55 pm: NBC News	5:00 pm: **Kukla, Fran and Ollie** 5:05 pm: local	local		
NBC	Spring	Continental Classroom		Today				local		Say When!!	Play Your Hunch In COLOR	The Price Is Right In COLOR	Concentration	**Your First Impression** In COLOR	12:30 pm: Truth or Consequences 12:55 pm: NBC News	local		The Jan Murray Show In COLOR	The Loretta Young Theater (R)	Young Doctor Malone	**Our Five Daughters**	Make Room for Daddy (R)	4:30 pm: Here's Hollywood 4:55 pm: NBC News	local			

== Saturday ==
Network		7:00 am	7:30 am	8:00 am	8:30 am	9:00 am	9:30 am	10:00 am	10:30 am	11:00 am	11:30 am	noon	12:30 pm	1:00 pm	1:30 pm	2:00 pm	2:30 pm	3:00 pm	3:30 pm	4:00 pm	4:30 pm	5:00 pm	5:30 pm	6:00 pm	6:30 pm
ABC	Fall	local programming								On Your Mark	Magic Ranch	local programming													
ABC	Winter	local programming										The Texan (R)	local programming												
ABC	Spring	local programming										The Bugs Bunny Show (R)	local programming												
CBS	Fall	local programming	Sunrise Semester	local programming		Captain Kangaroo		**Video Village Junior**	Mighty Mouse Playhouse	The Magic Land of Allakazam	The Roy Rogers Show (R)	Sky King (R)	My Friend Flicka (R)	CBS Saturday News	Accent	local programming									
CBS	Winter	local programming	Sunrise Semester	local programming		Captain Kangaroo		**Video Village Junior**	Mighty Mouse Playhouse	The Magic Land of Allakazam	The Roy Rogers Show (R)	Sky King (R)	My Friend Flicka (R)	CBS Saturday News	local programming										
CBS	Summer	local programming	Sunrise Semester	local programming		Captain Kangaroo		The Alvin Show (R)	Mighty Mouse Playhouse	The Magic Land of Allakazam	The Roy Rogers Show (R)	Sky King (R)	CBS Saturday News	local programming											
NBC	Fall	local programming					Pip the Piper	The Shari Lewis Show	King Leonardo and His Short Subjects	Fury (R)	Make Room for Daddy (R)	Update	Watch Mr. Wizard	local programming											
NBC	Spring	local programming					Pip the Piper	The Shari Lewis Show	King Leonardo and His Short Subjects	Fury (R)	Make Room for Daddy (R)	Watch Mr. Wizard	local programming												

== Sunday ==
Network		7:00 am	7:30 am	8:00 am	8:30 am	9:00 am	9:30 am	10:00 am	10:30 am	11:00 am	11:30 am	noon	12:30 pm	1:00 pm	1:30 pm	2:00 pm	2:30 pm	3:00 pm	3:30 pm	4:00 pm	4:30 pm	5:00 pm	5:30 pm	6:00 pm	6:30 pm
ABC	Fall	local programming																Issues and Answers	AFL on ABC and/or local						Maverick
ABC	Winter	local programming																ABC Sports and/or local		Issues and Answers	ABC Sports and/or local				Maverick
CBS	Fall	local programming						Lamp Unto My Feet	Look Up and Live	Camera Three	CBS Sports and/or local programming											Ted Mack's Amateur Hour	College Bowl	The Twentieth Century	Mister Ed
CBS	Winter	local programming						Lamp Unto My Feet	Look Up and Live	Camera Three	local programming		Washington Conversation	CBS Sports and/or local programming								Ted Mack's Amateur Hour	College Bowl	The Twentieth Century	Mister Ed
CBS	Summer	local programming						Lamp Unto My Feet	Look Up and Live	Camera Three	local programming		Washington Conversation	CBS Sports and/or local programming									Ted Mack's Amateur Hour	The Twentieth Century	Mister Ed
NBC	Fall	local programming											Youth Forum	local programming	Frontiers of Faith / Eternal Light / Catholic Hour	local programming		Open Mind		NBC Sports and/or local programming		Wisdom	Chet Huntley Reporting	Meet the Press	1, 2, 3, Go
NBC	Winter	local programming									Open Mind		Youth Forum	local programming	Frontiers of Faith / Eternal Light / Catholic Hour	NBC Sports and/or local programming						Wisdom	Chet Huntley Reporting	Meet the Press	1, 2, 3, Go
NBC	Spring	local programming											Youth Forum	local programming	Frontiers of Faith / Eternal Light / Catholic Hour	local programming		Open Mind		NBC Sports and/or local programming		Wisdom	Update	Meet the Press	1, 2, 3, Go
NBC	Summer	local programming											Youth Forum	local programming	Frontiers of Faith / Eternal Light / Catholic Hour	local programming		Open Mind		NBC Sports and/or local programming		Specials		Meet the Press	This is NBC News

== By network ==
=== ABC ===
**Returning Series**

- American Bandstand
- The Bugs Bunny Show (reruns)
- Camouflage
- Day in Court
- Issues and Answers
- Jane Wyman Presents (reruns)
- Love That Bob (reruns)
- Number Please
- Queen for a Day
- Seven Keys
- The Texan (reruns)
- Who Do You Trust?

**New Series**

- **American Newsstand**
- **Magic Ranch**
- **Make a Face**
- **On Your Mark**
- **The Tennessee Ernie Ford Show**
- **Window Shopping**
- **Yours for a Song**

**Not Returning From 1960-61**

- About Faces
- The Adventures of Rin-Tin-Tin (reruns)
- Beat the Clock
- Captain Gallant of the Foreign Legion (reruns)
- College News Conference
- The Gale Storm Show (reruns)
- The Lone Ranger (reruns)
- Lunch with Soupy Sales
- Matty's Funday Funnies
- The Paul Winchell and Jerry Mahoney Show
- Pip the Piper
- The Road to Reality
- Rocky and His Friends

=== CBS ===
**Returning Series**

- Accent
- The Alvin Show (reruns)
- Art Linkletter's House Party
- As the World Turns
- The Brighter Day
- Camera Three
- Captain Kangaroo
- CBS Saturday News
- The Clear Horizon
- College Bowl
- The Edge of Night
- Face the Nation
- The Guiding Light
- Lamp Unto My Feet
- Look Up and Live
- Love of Life
- I Love Lucy (reruns)
- The Magic Land of Allakazam
- Mighty Mouse Playhouse
- The Millionaire (reruns)
- My Friend Flicka (reruns)
- NFL on CBS
- The Roy Rogers Show (reruns)
- Search for Tomorrow
- The Secret Storm
- Sky King (reruns)
- Sunrise Semester
- Ted Mack's Amateur Hour
- The Twentieth Century
- Washington Conversation
- The Verdict is Yours
- Video Village
- Your Surprise Package

**New Series**

- **Calendar**
- **Password**
- **To Tell the Truth**
- **Video Village Junior**

**Not Returning From 1960-61**

- Double Exposure
- December Bride (reruns)
- Eye on New York
- Face the Facts
- Full Circle
- Television Workshop
- UN in Action

=== NBC ===
**Returning Series**

- Catholic Hour
- Chet Huntley Reporting
- Concentration
- Continental Classroom
- Eternal Light
- From These Roots
- Frontiers of Faith
- Fury (reruns)
- Here's Hollywood
- It Could Be You
- The Jan Murray Show
- King Leonardo and His Short Subjects
- The Loretta Young Theater
- Make Room for Daddy (reruns)
- Meet the Press
- Open Mind
- Pip the Piper
- Play Your Hunch
- The Price Is Right
- Say When!
- The Shari Lewis Show
- Today
- Truth or Consequences
- Watch Mr. Wizard
- Wisdom
- Young Doctor Malone
- Youth Forum

**New Series**

- **1,2,3, Go**
- **Kukla, Fran and Ollie**
- **Our Five Daughters**
- **Your First Impression**

**Not Returning From 1960-61**

- Celebrity Golf
- Detective's Diary (reruns)
- Dough Re Mi
- People are Funny (reruns)
- True Story

== See also ==
- 1961-62 United States network television schedule (prime-time)
- 1961-62 United States network television schedule (late night)

== Sources ==
- Castleman & Podrazik, The TV Schedule Book, McGraw-Hill Paperbacks, 1984
- Hyatt, The Encyclopedia Of Daytime Television, Billboard Books, 1997
- TV schedules, **NEW YORK TIMES**, September 1961-September 1962 (microfilm)
