= 1962–63 United States network television schedule (daytime) =

The following is the 1962–63 daytime network television schedule for the three major English-language commercial broadcast networks in the United States. It covers the weekday daytime hours from September 1962 to August 1963.

Talk shows are highlighted in yellow, local programming is white, reruns of prime-time programming are orange, game shows are pink, soap operas are chartreuse, news programs are gold and all others are light blue. New series are highlighted in bold.

== Monday-Friday ==
Network		6:00 am	6:30 am	7:00 am	7:30 am	8:00 am	8:30 am	9:00 am	9:30 am	10:00 am	10:30 am	11:00 am	11:30 am	noon	12:30 pm	1:00 pm	1:30 pm	2:00 pm	2:30 pm	3:00 pm	3:30 pm	4:00 pm	4:30 pm	5:00 pm	5:30 pm	6:00 pm	6:30 pm
ABC	Fall	local programming										The Tennessee Ernie Ford Show	Yours for a Song	Jane Wyman Presents (R)	12:30 pm: Camouflage; 12:55pm: ABC Midday Report	local programming		2:00 pm: Day in Court & 2:25 pm: ABC Early Afternoon Report	Seven Keys	Queen for a Day	Who Do You Trust?	American Bandstand	4:30 pm: **Discovery '62/'63** & 4:55 pm American Newsstand	local programming		The ABC Evening News with Ron Cochran 6:15: local programming	
ABC	November	local programming										The Tennessee Ernie Ford Show	Yours for a Song	Jane Wyman Presents (R)	**Father Knows Best** (R)	local programming		2:00 pm: Day in Court & 2:25 pm: ABC Early Afternoon Report	Seven Keys	Queen for a Day	Who Do You Trust?	American Bandstand	4:30 pm: **Discovery '62/'63** & 4:55 pm American Newsstand	local programming		The ABC Evening News with Ron Cochran 6:15: local programming	local programming
ABC	Winter	local programming										Jane Wyman Presents (R)	Yours for a Song	The Tennessee Ernie Ford Show	**Father Knows Best** (R)	local programming		2:00 pm: Day in Court & 2:25 pm: ABC Early Afternoon Report	Seven Keys	Queen for a Day	Who Do You Trust?	American Bandstand	4:30 pm: **Discovery '62/'63** & 4:55 pm American Newsstand	local programming		The ABC Evening News with Ron Cochran 6:15: local programming	local programming
ABC	Spring	local programming											Seven Keys	The Tennessee Ernie Ford Show	**Father Knows Best** (R)	**General Hospital**	local programming	2:00 pm: Day in Court & 2:25 pm: ABC Early Afternoon Report	Jane Wyman Presents (R)	Queen for a Day	Who Do You Trust?	American Bandstand	4:30 pm: **Discovery '62/'63** & 4:55 pm American Newsstand	local programming		The ABC Evening News with Ron Cochran 6:15: local programming	local programming
CBS	Fall	local programming				Captain Kangaroo		local programming		Calendar	I Love Lucy repeats	**The McCoys** (R)	**Pete and Gladys** (R)	12 Noon: Love of Life 12:25 pm: CBS News	12:30 pm: Search for Tomorrow 12:45 pm: The Guiding Light	local programming	As the World Turns	Password	Art Linkletter's House Party	The Millionaire (R)	3:30 pm: To Tell the Truth & 3:55 pm: CBS News	The Secret Storm	The Edge of Night	local programming			
CBS	Winter	local programming				Captain Kangaroo		local programming		Calendar	I Love Lucy repeats	**The McCoys** (R)	**Pete and Gladys** (R)	12 Noon: Love of Life 12:25 pm: CBS News	12:30 pm: Search for Tomorrow 12:45 pm: The Guiding Light	local programming	As the World Turns	Password	Art Linkletter's House Party	3:00 pm: To Tell the Truth & 3:25 pm: CBS News	The Millionaire (R)	The Secret Storm	The Edge of Night	local programming			
CBS	Summer	local programming				Captain Kangaroo		local programming		Calendar	I Love Lucy repeats	**The McCoys** (R)	**Pete and Gladys** (R)	12 Noon: Love of Life 12:25 pm: CBS News	12:30 pm: Search for Tomorrow 12:45 pm: The Guiding Light	local programming	As the World Turns	Password	Art Linkletter's House Party	3:00 pm: To Tell the Truth & 3:25 pm: CBS News	The Edge of Night	The Secret Storm	The Millionaire (R)	local programming			
NBC	Fall	Continental Classroom		Today				local programming		10:00 am: Say When!! & 10:25 am: NBC News	Play Your Hunch In COLOR	The Price Is Right In COLOR	Concentration	Your First Impression In COLOR	12:30 pm: Truth or Consequences & 12:55 pm: NBC News	local programming		2:00 pm: **The Merv Griffin Show** 2:55 pm NBC News		The Loretta Young Theater (R)	Young Dr. Malone	Make Room for Daddy (R)	Here's Hollywood	local programming			
NBC	Winter	Continental Classroom		Today				local programming		10:00 am: Say When!! & 10:25 am: NBC News	Play Your Hunch In COLOR	The Price Is Right In COLOR	Concentration	Your First Impression In COLOR	12:30 pm: Truth or Consequences & 12:55 pm: NBC News	local programming		2:00 pm: **The Merv Griffin Show** 2:55 pm NBC News		The Loretta Young Theater (R)	Young Dr. Malone	4:00 pm: **The Match Game** 4:25 pm: NBC News	Make Room for Daddy repeats	local programming			
NBC	Spring	Continental Classroom		Today				local programming		10:00 am: Say When!! & 10:25 am: NBC News	Play Your Hunch In COLOR	The Price Is Right In COLOR	Concentration	Your First Impression In COLOR	12:30 pm: Truth or Consequences & 12:55 pm: NBC News	local programming		2:00 pm: **Ben Jerrod** In COLOR 2:25 pm: NBC News	**The Doctors**	The Loretta Young Theater (R)	**You Don't Say!** In COLOR	4:00 pm: **The Match Game** 4:25 pm: NBC News	Make Room for Daddy repeats	local programming			
NBC	Summer	Continental Classroom		Today				local programming		10:00 am: Say When!! & 10:25 am: NBC News	Play Your Hunch In COLOR	The Price Is Right In COLOR	Concentration	Your First Impression In COLOR	12:30 pm: Truth or Consequences & 12:55 pm: NBC News	local programming		2:00 pm: **People Will Talk** In COLOR 2:25 pm: NBC News	**The Doctors**	The Loretta Young Theater (R)	**You Don't Say!** In COLOR	4:00 pm: **The Match Game** 4:25 pm: NBC News	Make Room for Daddy repeats	local programming			

== Saturday ==
Network		7:00 am	7:30 am	8:00 am	8:30 am	9:00 am	9:30 am	10:00 am	10:30 am	11:00 am	11:30 am	noon	12:30 pm	1:00 pm	1:30 pm	2:00 pm	2:30 pm	3:00 pm	3:30 pm	4:00 pm	4:30 pm	5:00 pm	5:30 pm
ABC		local programming								Make a Face	Top Cat (R)	The Bugs Bunny Show (R)	The Magic Land of Allakazam	My Friend Flicka (R)	local programming								
CBS	Fall	local programming	Sunrise Semester	local programming		Captain Kangaroo		The Alvin Show (R)	Mighty Mouse Playhouse	The Adventures of Rin Tin Tin (R)	The Roy Rogers Show (R)	Sky King (R)	**The Reading Room**	CBS Saturday News	local programming								
CBS	Spring	local programming	Sunrise Semester	local programming		Captain Kangaroo		The Alvin Show (R)	Mighty Mouse Playhouse	The Adventures of Rin Tin Tin (R)	The Roy Rogers Show (R)	Sky King (R)	CBS Saturday News	local programming									
NBC	Fall	local programming					The Ruff and Reddy Show (R) In COLOR	The Shari Lewis Show	King Leonardo and His Short Subjects In COLOR	Fury (R)	**Marx Magic Midway**	Make Room for Daddy (R)	**Exploring**		Watch Mr. Wizard	local programming							
NBC	April	local programming					The Ruff and Reddy Show (R) In COLOR	The Shari Lewis Show	King Leonardo and His Short Subjects In COLOR	Fury (R)	Make Room for Daddy (R)	Watch Mr. Wizard	**Exploring**		local programming								
NBC	July	local programming					The Ruff and Reddy Show (R) In COLOR	The Shari Lewis Show	King Leonardo and His Short Subjects In COLOR	Fury (R)	Make Room for Daddy (R)	Watch Mr. Wizard	local programming										

== Sunday ==
Network		7:00 am	7:30 am	8:00 am	8:30 am	9:00 am	9:30 am	10:00 am	10:30 am	11:00 am	11:30 am	noon	12:30 pm	1:00 pm	1:30 pm	2:00 pm	2:30 pm	3:00 pm	3:30 pm	4:00 pm	4:30 pm	5:00 pm	5:30 pm	6:00 pm	6:30 pm
ABC	Fall	local programming														Directions '62	local programming	Issues and Answers	AFL on ABC and/or local						
ABC	Winter	local programming														Directions '63	Issues and Answers	ABC Sports and/or local							
ABC	Summer	local programming															Issues and Answers	ABC Sports and/or local							
CBS	Fall	local programming						Lamp Unto My Feet	Look Up and Live	Camera Three	Face the Nation	NFL Kickoff 12:15: local programming	NFL on CBS and/or local programming									Ted Mack's Amateur Hour	College Bowl	The Twentieth Century	Password
CBS	Winter	local programming						Lamp Unto My Feet	Look Up and Live	Camera Three	Face the Nation	CBS Sports and/or local programming										Ted Mack's Amateur Hour	College Bowl	The Twentieth Century	Password
CBS	Summer	local programming						Lamp Unto My Feet	Look Up and Live	Camera Three	Face the Nation	CBS Sports and/or local programming											Ted Mack's Amateur Hour	The Twentieth Century	Password
NBC	Fall	local programming											Youth Forum	local programming	Frontiers of Faith / Eternal Light / Catholic Hour	local programming		Open Mind		NBC Sports and/or local programming			The Bullwinkle Show In COLOR	Meet the Press	**McKeever and the Colonel**
NBC	Summer	local programming											Youth Forum	local programming	Frontiers of Faith / Eternal Light / Catholic Hour	local programming		Open Mind		NBC Sports and/or local programming			The Bullwinkle Show In COLOR	Meet the Press	Sunday Report

== By network ==
=== ABC ===
**Returning Series**

- American Bandstand
- American Newsstand
- The Bugs Bunny Show (reruns)
- Camouflage
- Day in Court
- Issues and Answers
- Jane Wyman Presents (reruns)
- The Magic Land of Allakazam (moved from CBS)
- My Friend Flicka (reruns)
- Queen for a Day
- Seven Keys
- The Tennessee Ernie Ford Show
- Top Cat (reruns)
- Who Do You Trust?
- Yours for a Song

**New Series**

- **Directions**
- **Discovery**
- **Father Knows Best** (reruns)
- **General Hospital**

**Not Returning From 1961-62**

- Love That Bob (reruns)
- Magic Ranch
- Number Please
- On Your Mark
- The Texan (reruns)
- Window Shopping

=== CBS ===
**Returning Series**

- The Adventures of Rin-Tin-Tin (reruns)
- The Alvin Show (reruns)
- Art Linkletter's House Party
- As the World Turns
- Calendar
- Camera Three
- Captain Kangaroo
- CBS Saturday News
- College Bowl
- The Edge of Night
- Face the Nation
- The Guiding Light
- Lamp Unto My Feet
- Look Up and Live
- Love of Life
- I Love Lucy (reruns)
- Mighty Mouse Playhouse
- The Millionaire (reruns)
- NFL on CBS
- Password
- The Roy Rogers Show (reruns)
- Search for Tomorrow
- The Secret Storm
- Sky King (reruns)
- Sunrise Semester
- Ted Mack's Amateur Hour
- To Tell the Truth
- The Twentieth Century

**New Series**

- **The McCoys** (reruns)
- **Pete and Gladys** (reruns)
- **The Reading Room**

**Not Returning From 1961-62**

- Accent
- The Brighter Day
- The Clear Horizon
- The Magic Land of Allakazam (moved to ABC)
- Washington Conversation
- The Verdict is Yours
- Video Village
- Video Village Junior
- Your Surprise Package

=== NBC ===
**Returning Series**

- The Bullwinkle Show
- Catholic Hour
- Concentration
- Continental Classroom
- Eternal Light
- Frontiers of Faith
- Fury (reruns)
- Here's Hollywood
- King Leonardo and His Short Subjects
- The Loretta Young Theater
- Make Room for Daddy (reruns)
- Meet the Press
- Open Mind
- Play Your Hunch
- The Price Is Right
- The Ruff and Reddy Show (reruns)
- Say When!
- The Shari Lewis Show
- Today
- Truth or Consequences
- Watch Mr. Wizard
- Young Doctor Malone
- Your First Impression
- Youth Forum

**New Series**

- **Ben Jerrod**
- **The Doctors**
- **Exploring**
- **Marx Magic Midway**
- **The Match Game**
- **The Merv Griffin Show**
- **People Will Talk**
- **You Don't Say!**

**Not Returning From 1961-62**

- 1,2,3, Go
- From These Roots
- It Could Be You
- The Jan Murray Show
- Kukla, Fran and Ollie
- Our Five Daughters
- Pip the Piper

== See also ==
- 1962-63 United States network television schedule (prime-time)
- 1962-63 United States network television schedule (late night)

== Sources ==
- Castleman & Podrazik, The TV Schedule Book, McGraw-Hill Paperbacks, 1984
- TV schedules, NEW YORK TIMES, September 1962-September 1963 (microfilm)
