= List of Fireside Theatre episodes =

Fireside Theatre, a.k.a. The Jane Wyman Show, is an American anthology drama series that ran on NBC from 1949 to 1958, and was the first successful filmed series on American television. Early seasons (1-7) featured low budget productions and were often based on public domain stories. Later seasons (8-10) included source material from well known writers including Eudora Welty, Patricia Highsmith and Cornell Woolrich as well as original scripts by freelance writers such as Rod Serling, Aaron Spelling and Quinn Martin.

== Series overview ==
Season	Episodes	Originally released	
Season	Episodes	First released	Last released
1	12	April 5, 1949	June 28, 1949
2	41	September 6, 1949	June 27, 1950
3	46	August 29, 1950	August 21, 1951
4	44	August 28, 1951	June 24, 1952
5	39	September 30, 1952	June 30, 1953
6	44	September 1, 1953	June 29, 1954
7	43	September 7, 1954	June 28, 1955
8	35	August 30, 1955	April 24, 1956
9	34	August 28, 1956	June 11, 1957
10	24	September 26, 1957	May 22, 1958

== Episodes ==
=== Season 1 (1949) ===
No. overall	No. in season	Title	Directed by	Written by	Original release date
1	1	"Friend of the Family"	Unknown	Unknown	April 5, 1949
2	2	"Ghost Story"	Unknown	Unknown	April 12, 1949
3	3	"Leonard Silliman's New Faces"	Unknown	Unknown	April 19, 1949
4	4	"What's New in the News"	Unknown	Unknown	April 26, 1949
5	5	"Meet My Sister"	Unknown	Unknown	May 3, 1949
6	6	"Time Bomb"	Unknown	Unknown	May 10, 1949
7	7	"Brain Bobby"	Unknown	Unknown	May 17, 1949
8	8	"Make a Wish"	Unknown	Unknown	May 24, 1949
9	9	"Feature Story"	Unknown	Unknown	June 7, 1949
10	10	"Dance Discoveries"	Unknown	Unknown	June 14, 1949
11	11	"The Stronger" / "A Terribly Strange Bed"	William Cameron Menzies	Unknown	June 21, 1949
12	12	"Father"	Unknown	Unknown	June 28, 1949

=== Season 2 (1949–50) ===
No. overall	No. in season	Title	Directed by	Written by	Original release date
13	1	"Smooth Fingers" / "Germelshausen"	Unknown	Unknown	September 6, 1949
14	2	"The Four Fifteen Express" / "Charlotte Corday"	Unknown	Unknown	September 13, 1949
15	3	"Vain Glory" / "Out on the River"	Unknown	Unknown	September 20, 1949
16	4	"The Spy" / "The Postmistress of Laurel Rim"	Unknown	Unknown	September 27, 1949
17	5	"Like Money in the Bank" / "Magic Skin"	Unknown	Unknown	October 4, 1949
18	6	"Scream in the Night" / "Troubled Harbor"	Unknown	Unknown	October 11, 1949
19	7	"Bandit, Banker and Blonde" / "The Wall"	Unknown	Unknown	October 18, 1949
20	8	"Heartbeat" / "Mardi Gras"	William Cameron Menzies	Unknown	October 25, 1949
21	9	"Checkmate" / "Solange"	Unknown	Unknown	November 1, 1949
22	10	"Night Owl" / "Another Road"	Unknown	Unknown	November 8, 1949
23	11	"Stagecoach Driver McLean" / "Cowboy's Lament"	Unknown	Unknown	November 15, 1949
24	12	"The Room" / "Epilogue"	John Reinhardt	Unknown	November 29, 1949
25	13	"Sealed Orders" / "Battle Scene"	John Reinhardt	Unknown	December 6, 1949
26	14	"The Pardoner's Tale" / "The Human Touch"	Unknown	Unknown	December 13, 1949
27	15	"The Doll" / "The Bet"	Unknown	Unknown	December 20, 1949
28	16	"The Gauntlet" / "Threshold"	Unknown	Unknown	December 27, 1949
29	17	"Judas"	Unknown	Arnold Belgard	January 3, 1950
30	18	"The Devil's Due" / "Rendezvous"	John Reinhardt	Unknown	January 10, 1950
31	19	"The Golden Ball" / "Just Three Words"	John Reinhardt	Agatha Christie & John Reinhardt	January 17, 1950
32	20	"Confession" / "Reprieve"	Unknown	Unknown	January 24, 1950
33	21	"Of Thee I Love" / "Double Jeopardy"	Unknown	Unknown	January 31, 1950
34	22	"The Imp in the Bottle" / "The Stronger"	Unknown	Unknown	February 7, 1950
35	23	"The Shot" / "The Bed by the Window"	Unknown	Unknown	February 14, 1950
36	24	"Anniversary" / "Jungle Terror"	John Reinhardt	Unknown	February 21, 1950
37	25	"A Terribly Strange Bed" / "The Stronger"	Unknown	Unknown	February 28, 1950
38	26	"Germelshausen" / "Sealed Orders"	Unknown	Unknown	March 7, 1950
39	27	"The General's Coat" / "Vain Glory"	Unknown	Unknown	March 14, 1950
40	28	"The Leather Heart"	Frank Wisbar	Unknown	March 21, 1950
41	29	"The Bunker"	Unknown	Unknown	March 28, 1950
42	30	"Operation Mona Lisa"	Unknown	Unknown	April 4, 1950
43	31	"The Tangled Web"	Unknown	Unknown	April 11, 1950
44	32	"No Strings Attached"	Unknown	Unknown	April 18, 1950
45	33	"Boys Will Be Men"	Unknown	Unknown	April 25, 1950
46	34	"The Parasol"	Unknown	Unknown	May 9, 1950
47	35	"Hired Girl"	Frank Wisbar	Arthur St. Claire	May 16, 1950
48	36	"Big Ben"	Unknown	Arch Oboler	May 23, 1950
49	37	"Man Without a Country"	Frank Wisbar	Unknown	May 30, 1950
50	38	"The Human Touch" / "The Assassin"	John Reinhardt	Unknown	June 6, 1950
51	39	"Dinner For Three" / "The Devil's Due"	Unknown	Unknown	June 13, 1950
52	40	"The Courting of Bell" / "Rendezvous"	Unknown	Unknown	June 20, 1950
53	41	"The Ear"	Unknown	Unknown	June 27, 1950

=== Season 3 (1950–51) ===
No. overall	No. in season	Title	Directed by	Written by	Original release date
54	1	"Polly"	Frank Wisbar	Unknown	August 29, 1950
55	2	"Stopover"	Frank Wisbar	Unknown	September 5, 1950
56	3	"The Canterville Ghost"	Frank Wisbar	Unknown	September 12, 1950
57	4	"Incident in the Rain"	Frank Wisbar	Arnold Lippschitz	September 19, 1950
58	5	"Andy's Old Man"	Frank Wisbar	Unknown	September 26, 1950
59	6	"International Incident"	Unknown	Unknown	October 3, 1950
60	7	"Lucy and the Stranger"	Frank Wisbar	Unknown	October 10, 1950
61	8	"Hope Chest"	Frank Wisbar	Unknown	October 17, 1950
62	9	"The Amber Gods"	Frank Wisbar	Story by : Harriet Prescott Spofford; Teleplay by : Adele Comandini & Edith Martin	October 24, 1950
63	10	"Mother's Mutiny"	Frank Wisbar	Unknown	October 31, 1950
64	11	"The Kingdom Within"	Frank Wisbar	Unknown	November 7, 1950
65	12	"Party Line"	Frank Wisbar	Unknown	November 14, 1950
66	13	"Love of Mike"	Frank Wisbar	Unknown	November 21, 1950
67	14	"Three Strangers"	Frank Wisbar	Unknown	November 28, 1950
68	15	"The Green Convertible"	Frank Wisbar	Unknown	December 5, 1950
69	16	"The Case of Marina Goodwin"	Frank Wisbar	Unknown	December 12, 1950
70	17	"Miggles"	Unknown	Unknown	December 19, 1950
71	18	"No Children, No Dogs"	Frank Wisbar	Unknown	December 26, 1950
72	19	"Flight Thirteen"	Frank Wisbar	Story by : David Boehm; Teleplay by : Josef Mischel	January 2, 1951
73	20	"Neutral Corner"	Frank Wisbar	William R. Cox & Leslie Urbach	January 9, 1951
74	21	"Looking Through"	Frank Wisbar	Curt Siodmak	January 16, 1951
75	22	"Drums in the Night"	Frank Wisbar	Story by : Frank Wisbar; Teleplay by : Josef Mischel	January 23, 1951
76	23	"Child in the House"	Frank Wisbar	Story by : Joe Pagano; Teleplay by : D.A. Jowitt	January 30, 1951
77	24	"Hottest Day of the Year"	Frank Wisbar	Story by : Frank Wisbar; Teleplay by : Alfred Lewis Levitt & Josef Mischel	February 6, 1951
78	25	"The Substance of His House"	Frank Wisbar	Story by : Brenda Weisberg; Teleplay by : David V. Robison	February 13, 1951
79	26	"Going Home"	Frank Wisbar	Story by : Brewster Morgan; Teleplay by : Samuel B. Harrison	February 20, 1951
80	27	"Copy Boy"	Frank Wisbar	Story by : Richard Harding Davis; Teleplay by : Wells Root	February 27, 1951
81	28	"The Acquittal" "Malachi's Cove"	Charles Frank	Charles Frank & Anthony Trollope	March 6, 1951
82	29	"Shifting Sands"	Frank Wisbar	Margaret McDonell & Wells Root	March 13, 1951
83	30	"The Eleventh Hour"	Frank Wisbar	Story by : Perceval Gibbon; Teleplay by : Arnold Lippschitz	March 20, 1951
84	31	"Unwritten Column"	Unknown	Unknown	March 27, 1951
85	32	"The Gentleman from LaPorte"	Frank Wisbar	Story by : Bret Harte; Teleplay by : Brenda Weisberg	April 3, 1951
86	33	"Hot Spot"	Frank Wisbar	Story by : Margaret McDonell; Teleplay by : Wells Root	April 10, 1951
87	34	"Close Shave"	Frank Wisbar	Story by : MacGowan Cooke; Teleplay by : D.A. Jowitt & Brewster Morgan	April 17, 1951
88	35	"The Celebrated Mrs. Rowland"	Frank Wisbar	Story by : George Zuckerman; Teleplay by : James Gunn & Brewster Morgan	April 24, 1951
89	36	"The Moment of Truth"	Robert Angus	Unknown	May 1, 1951
90	37	"The Tunnel"	Frank Wisbar	Gabrielle Windsor	May 8, 1951
91	38	"Back to Zero"	Frank Wisbar	Unknown	May 15, 1951
92	39	"Moment of Glory"	Frank Wisbar	Unknown	July 3, 1951
93	40	"The Vigil"	Frank Wisbar	Unknown	July 10, 1951
94	41	"A Little Night Music"	Frank Wisbar	Raphael Hayes	July 17, 1951
95	42	"A Jury of Her Peers"	Frank Wisbar	Susan Glaspell	July 24, 1951
96	43	"Deliver Us From Evil"	Frank Wisbar	Unknown	July 31, 1951
97	44	"Agnew Jones and the Giants"	Frank Wisbar	Unknown	August 7, 1951
98	45	"Make Believe"	Frank Wisbar	Raphael Hayes	August 14, 1951
99	46	"The Lottery"	Frank Wisbar	Story by : Shirley Jackson; Teleplay by : Ernest Kinoy	August 21, 1951

=== Season 4 (1951–52) ===
Episodes in this season included "Doctor Mac" on October 9, 1951.

=== Season 6 (1953–54) ===
Episodes in this season included "Harvest of Wrath" on May 10, 1954. Faith Domergue and Charles Drake were the stars.

=== Season 8 (1955-56) ===
No. overall	No. in season	Title	Directed by	Written by	Original release date
269	1*	"Technical Charge of Murder"	Sidney Lanfield	story by: Zelda Popkin teleplay by: Cyril Hume	August 30, 1955
Cast: Jane Wyman (Rita)
270	2*	"Gusher City"	Don Weis	William Froug	September 6, 1955
Cast: Jane Wyman (Maryann Goldsmith)
271	3	"The Director"	Herschel Daugherty	Rod Serling	September 13, 1955
The director of a popular television show is the only person who has confidence in a "has-been" actor. The actor falls apart at rehearsal, and tension mounts as air time draws near. Cast: Jack Carson
272	4*	"Holiday in Autumn"	Unknown	Elick Moll	September 20, 1955
A successful Hollywood social director refuses to give up her career for marriage. Cast: Jane Wyman (Mary)
273	5	"Little Guy"	Don Weis	David P. Harmon	September 27, 1955
A short man has a prominent chip on his shoulder for all bigger people. When two murderers enter a bar and hold everyone at bay including a young fighter and a tough racketeer, the "little guy" has a decision to make.
274	6	"The Sport"	Sidney Lanfield	Madelyn Pugh & Quinn Martin	October 3, 1955
Cast: Jayne Meadows & Keenan Wynn
275	7	"Stephen and Publius Cyrus"	Don Weis	Nathaniel Curtis	October 11, 1955
When the Evans family is killed in an accident in a foreign country, only a baby boy, Stephen, survives. Cast: Peter Lawford
276	8*	"One Last September"	Unknown	Kathleen Hite	October 18, 1955
Cast: Jane Wyman (Liz) & Don Murray (Ken)
277	9	"The Smuggler"	Don Weis	story by: Victor Canning teleplay by: Blake Edwards	October 25, 1955
A jealous rival informs on a popular fisherman who is smuggling whiskey in and enemies out from under the nose of the country's annoyed dictator. Cast: Gilbert Roland (Tasso)
278	10	"Nailed Down"	Don Weis	story by: Harry Sinclair Drago teleplay by: David P. Harmon	November 1, 1955
A fleeing gang leader is also a doctor and seeks refuge at the ranch of a former cohort whose wife is dangerously ill in childbirth. If the outlaw stays to save the woman, he will be captured. Cast: Gene Barry & Dan Duryea
279	11*	"Ride with the Executioner"	Unknown	Charlotte Armstrong	November 8, 1955
During a recess period, one of a young teacher's pupils kills himself with his father's gun. The boy's grief-crazed father vows vengeance upon the teacher that he thinks caused his son's death. Cast: Jane Wyman (Eve)
280	12*	"The Key"	Unknown	story by: Eudora Welty & Helen Dore Boyleston teleplay by: Frank De Felitta & Leo Townsend	November 15, 1955
A young student nurse, training at a sanatorium, becomes friendly with a young female patient. Although the authorities frown on the relationship, the nurse persists in her efforts to help the disturbed girl. Cast: Jane Wyman (Jean Bradford)
281	13	"His Maiden Voyage"	Don Weis	Jameson Brewer	November 22, 1955
An old man endures endless ridicule because of his dreams of sailing the seas in a vessel that he has built.
282	14	"Women at Sea"	James Sheldon	Hagar Wilde	November 29, 1955
A neglected wife goes unaccompanied on an ocean voyage. She develops a strong attraction to a handsome stranger who is accompanied by his wife.
283	15*	"Bamboo Cross"	John Ford	story by: Laurence Stallings teleplay by: Maria Del Rey & Theophane Lee	December 6, 1955
In a Catholic convent in China, two nuns are menaced by a Communist overlord who falsely accuses them of murdering babies in their care. Cast: Jane Wyman (Sister Regina)
284	16	"As Long as I Live"	Robert Stevenson	story by: Taylor Caldwell teleplay by: Leo Townsend	December 13, 1955
A despondent man decides to take a final fling and then kill himself. Cast: Brian Keith & Dan O'Herlihy
285	17*	"Along Came a Bachelor"	Sidney Lanfield	story by: Edwin Gilbert & Virginia Gilbert teleplay by: Katherine Albert & Dale Eunson	December 20, 1955
Cast: Jane Wyman (Widow)
286	18	"Big Joe’s Comin’ Home"	Blake Edwards	David P. Harmon	December 27, 1955
A former gangland boss returns after 25 years in prison, expecting things to be the same. Cast: Victor McLaglen
287	19*	"Once Upon a Nightmare"	Sidney Lanfield	story by: Cornell Woolrich teleplay by: John McGreevey	January 3, 1956
Cast: Jane Wyman (Emily Prince)
288	20	"The Liberator"	Jacques Tourneur	story by Indro Montanelli teleplay by: John Fante	January 10, 1956
A war-torn town once occupied by enemy troops. Vico Ferrasco, the leader of the partisan group during the liberation of Italy returns with his band to his small village intent on asserting his power. Cast: Sebastian Cabot
289	21*	"The House on Elm Street"	Sidney Lanfield	Unknown	January 17, 1956
Helen Crane, who lives alone in an old mansion, suffers a series of terrifying experiences. Cast: Jane Wyman (Helen Crane)
290	22*	"Excuse Me for Living"	Sidney Lanfield	story by: Adelaide Gerstley teleplay by: Leo Townsend	January 24, 1956
Comic confusion results when a mother-in-law joins a young couple in their crowded city apartment. Cast: Jane Wyman (Wife)
291	23	"The Velvet Trap"	William Asher	David P. Harmon	January 31, 1956
An informer is sought by the brother of his former partner. Cast: James Whitmore
292	24*	"Not What She Pretended"	Sidney Lanfield	Unknown	February 7, 1956
A socialite is mysteriously drawn to a quaint, out-of-the-way tavern and the bar owner's handsome son. Cast: Jane Wyman (Barbara Towne)
293	25*	"Kristi"	Jacques Tourneur	story by: Gladys Hasty Carroll teleplay by: Jameson Brewer	February 14, 1956
A Norwegian bride is faced with the task of winning over the strait-laced residents of a puritanical New England community. Cast: Jane Wyman (Kristi Stone) & Charles Coburn
294	26*	"The Thread"	Unknown	Stirling Silliphant & Collier Young	February 21, 1956
An irresponsible socialite is under the illusion that she can buy her way out of any kind of trouble. Cast: Jane Wyman (Leslie Bell)
295	27	"The Mirror"	Jacques Tourneur	story by: Alphonse Daudet & Jack Schaefer teleplay by: Jack Hanley	February 21, 1956
An eastern society girl marries a blacksmith and goes out west with him to found a cattle empire.
296	28*	"An Echo Out of the Past"	Sidney Lanfield	story by: William J. Locke teleplay by: Leo Townsend	March 6, 1956
A World War II field nurse discovers that her temporarily blind patient is her former sweetheart. Cast: Jane Wyman (Lieutenant Meg)
297	29*	"Scent of Roses"	Unknown	story by: Mary Eleanor Freeman teleplay by: Leo Townsend	March 13, 1956
After waiting for years for her fiancé to return from his trip out west, Clarissa is sure that it is a hopeless cause. When he finally does return, she is convinced that he is more interested in her younger sister than her. Cast: Jane Wyman (Clarissa)
298	30	"Shoot the Moon"	Ozzie Nelson	story by: Pat Frank teleplay by: William Bowers	January 24, 1956
A government scientist juggles secretary problems. Cast: Ozzie Nelson & Nancy Kulp
299	31*	"Sound of Thunder"	Sidney Lanfield	story by: Endre Bohem & Louis Vittes teleplay by: Richard Collins	March 27, 1956
A concert pianist suffers a permanent physical injury to her hands. Cast: Jane Wyman (May Knight)
300	32*	"In a Different Life"	Don Weis	story by: Gabrielle Upton teleplay by: Leo Townsend	April 3, 1956
A geologist and his wife arrive at a remote Peruvian village in the backwaters of the Amazon. Although neither of them has ever been in that part of the country before, the wife displays an uncanny knowledge of the people, their way of life and even their language. Cast: Jane Wyman (Marie)
301	33	"This Land Is Mine"	Don Weis	story by: Verne Athanas teleplay by: David P. Harmon	April 10, 1956
Homesteaders of the West run into trouble. The gunmen who already control the territory are unwilling to share the land.
302	34*	"The Past Is Always Present"	Sidney Lanfield	story by: Leslie Edgley teleplay by: David P. Harmon	April 17, 1956
On her honeymoon a bride discovers that her husband was suspected of murdering his wealthy first wife. Cast: Jane Wyman (Karen Foster)
303	35*	"The Hidden People"	Sidney Lanfield	Jameson Brewer	April 24, 1956
A hotel for elderly residents acquires a new maid who was once a music hall entertainer and she disrupts the staid routine of the hotel. Cast: Jane Wyman (Cleary Penryn)

=== Season 9 (1956-57) ===
No. overall	No. in season	Title	Directed by	Written by	Original release date
304	1*	"Ten Percent"	Sidney Lanfield	story by: Ronn Marvin teleplay by: Tony Barrett	August 28, 1956
Cast: Jane Wyman (Laura Ann Roberts)
305	2*	"Dirty Face"	Unknown	Unknown	September 4, 1956
A young boy escapes from reform school and tries to rob a woman. Cast: Jane Wyman (Martha Quillen)
306	3*	"Approved by Censor"	Unknown	George F. Slavin	September 11, 1956
Cast: Jane Wyman (Lt. Edith Collins)
307	4	"The Way to Heaven"	Don Weis	story by: Grace Sartwell Mason teleplay by: Jameson Brewer	September 18, 1956
An aging New York parish priest is relieved of his heavy duties and sent to El Diablo, a small wine center in California. Cast: Gene Lockhart
308	5*	"Let Yesterday Die"	Don Weis	story by: Alice Wilt Strauss teleplay by: Leo Townsend	September 25, 1956
Cast: Jane Wyman (Mrs. Norwood)
309	6*	"Assignment Champ"	Sidney Lanfield	Leonard Freeman	October 2, 1956
A woman reporter faces a career vs marriage problem. To complicate matters further, her husband, who wants her to quit her job, is also her editor. Cast: Jane Wyman (Susan Clarke)
310	7*	"No More Tears"	Sidney Lanfield	story by: Alice Eleanor Jones teleplay by: Kathleen Hite	October 16, 1956
A woman who has lost her son in tragic circumstances has amnesia. Cast: Jane Wyman (Olivia)
311	8	"Between Jobs"	Don Weis	David P. Harmon	October 30, 1956
A man with psychotic tendencies conspires with an unscrupulous sea captain to steal a fortune in precious jewels. Cast: Neville Brand
312	9*	"Father Forgets"	Felix E. Feist	teleplay by: Felix E. Feist	November 13, 1956
In his attempts to perfect a new invention, a man nearly forgets his responsibility for his wife and young son. Cast: Jane Wyman: (Katie Barns)
313	10*	"The Marked Bullet"	Sidney Lanfield	Ray Bradbury	November 20, 1956
The wife was having an affair and they have to go through a bullet trick routine in which the husband forces the lover through some means to fire a bullet at the end of the act, which the wife is supposed to catch in her teeth. Cast: Jane Wyman (Madame Olivia)
314	11*	"A Time to Live"	Unknown	story by: Theodore W. Case teleplay by: Leo Townsend	November 27, 1956
A visit to the grave of her first husband in France nearly ruins the second marriage of a grieving woman. Cast: Jane Wyman (Susan)
315	12	"Helpmate"	Don Weis	story by: Anton Chekhov teleplay by: David P. Harmon	December 4, 1956
The wife of a private detective attempts to help her husband solve a crime. Cast: Imogene Coca
316	13*	"While There’s Life"	Unknown	Doris Hursley & Frank Hursley	December 18, 1956
A middle-aged woman becomes involved in a romance but her possessive married sister opposes marriage for the two. Cast: Jane Wyman (Pauline)
317	14*	"A Point of Law"	Unknown	story by: Hewitt Leonard Balowe teleplay by: Stephanie Nordli	November 13, 1956
Cast: Jane Wyman (Sidney Brandt) & Virginia Grey
318	15	"A Place on the Bay"	Robert Florey	story by: James L. Henderson teleplay by: Leonard Freeman	December 26, 1956
Houseboat living has Laura Robertson at bay and she wants her husband to scuttle the idea. Cast: Gene Barry & Gloria Talbott
319	16	"The Little Black Lie"	Sidney Lanfield	story by: William Jerome Fay teleplay by: David P. Harmon & Leo Townsend	January 1, 1957
A policeman takes an interest in a pretty nightclub pianist when she is threatened by an ex-con. Cast: Carolyn Jones
320	17*	"Twenty Dollar Bride"	Unknown	Aaron Spelling	January 8, 1957
Cast: Jane Wyman (Sarah March)
321	18*	"Portrait in Fear"	Unknown	Tony Barrett	January 15, 1957
Cast: Jane Wyman (Paula Miller)
322	19*	"The Golden Door"	Unknown	Jameson Brewer	January 22, 1957
Cast: Jane Wyman (Cleary Penryn)
323	20	"Killer’s Pride"	Robert Florey	story by: Leslie McFarlane teleplay by: Michael Fessier	January 29, 1957
A sensitive young college student joins a posse of hardened men who are tracking down a killer.
324	21*	"Birthright"	Unknown	story by: Ann Pinchot & Ben Pinchot teleplay by: Michael Fessier	February 5, 1957
A nurse attempts to convince a distraught mother-to-be that having a child is the most glorious experience in a woman's life. Cast: Jane Wyman (Ellen Hensley)
325	22*	"Small Talk"	Sidney Lanfield	story by: George F. Slavin teleplay by: David P. Harmon	February 12, 1957
Cast: Jane Wyman (Ann Baker)
326	23*	"Farmer’s Wife"	Unknown	story by: Guy de Maupassant & Norma Mansfield teleplay by: Michael Fessier	February 19, 1957
Cast: Jane Wyman (Tita)
327	24	"A Dangerous Thing"	Unknown	Jameson Brewer	February 26, 1957
A librarian becomes uneasy when an unsavoury character begins frequenting the library. She is certain he is not the scholarly type. Cast: Jeannie Carson
328	25*	"Married to a Stranger"	Sidney Lanfield	story by: Victor Case teleplay by: Kathleen Hite	March 5, 1957
Susanna Holt's husband has cholera. Cast: Jane Wyman (Susanna Holt)
329	26*	"The Pendulum"	Sidney Lanfield	story by: Colin MacKenzie teleplay by: David P. Harmon	March 12, 1957
The testimony of a woman figures prominently in sending her former fiancé to prison. Cast: Jane Wyman (Laura Kincaid)
330	27	"The Wildcatter"	Jerry Hopper	William Froug & Kathleen Hite	March 19, 1957
Cast: Claude Akins & Virginia Grey
331	28*	"Mama Bufano’s"	Unknown	story by: Jo Sinclair teleplay by: Kathleen Hite	March 26, 1957
Cast: Jane Wyman (Millie)
332	29*	"Not for Publication"	Unknown	story by: Harvey Jerrold O'Higgins & Rufus King teleplay by: Michael Fessier	April 16, 1957
Cast: Jane Wyman (Violet Fitzhugh)
333	30	"Harbor Patrol"	Richard Irving	John Robinson	April 23, 1957
A man suspected of peddling narcotics is sought by the chief of the harbor patrol. Leads are almost non-existent until a pair of half-drunk women become involved in an argument.
334	31*	"The Man in the Car"	Sidney Lanfield	story by: Nancy Titus teleplay by: David P. Harmon	April 30, 1957
Just after moving into a partly furnished home, a husband leaves his wife alone to make an out-of-town business trip. An unexpected visitor and the half-empty house create strange fears in the wife's mind. Cast: Jane Wyman (Martha Carroll)
335	32*	"There Comes One Moment"	Sidney Lanfield	Peter Barry	May 7, 1957
An actor with failing memory falls in love with his psychotherapist. Cast: Jane Wyman (Dr. Edna Carlin) & Larry Pennell
336	33*	"Night of Terror"	Unknown	story by: Jean De Laney teleplay by: David P. Harmon	May 14, 1957
A woman driving alone through a lonely stretch of desert stops at a small café. There, she learns of a maniac at large in the area who preys on people who travel alone. Cast: Jane Wyman (Diane Nolan)
337	34*	"Two Sides to Everything"	Unknown	Unknown	June 11, 1957
A female reporter is engaged to a newspaperman from a rival publication but they are forbidden by their respective bosses to associate with each other. Cast: Jane Wyman (Peggy)

=== Season 10 (1957–58) ===
No. overall	No. in season	Title	Directed by	Written by	Original release date
338	1*	"The Way Home"	Allen H. Miner	story by: Phyllis Duganne teleplay by: Steve Fisher	September 26, 1957
Ann Langley picks up a hitchhiker on a deserted highway, who turns out to be an escaped convict. Cast: Jane Wyman (Ann Langley)
339	2	"Contact"	Allen H. Miner	story by: Samuel Marx teleplay by: Jack Jacobs	October 3, 1957
Bruce Malone, chief pilot of an airline company, tries to help a crusading newspaperman to leave a South American country in the middle of a political upheaval. The man disappears but Malone finds a clue to his whereabouts when a baseball is thrown through a window. Cast: Joseph Cotten
340	3	"The Man on the Thirty-fifth Floor"	Oscar Rudolph	Unknown	October 10, 1957
Cast: MacDonald Carey
341	4*	"The Animal Instinct"	Allen H. Miner	story by: Bart Burns teleplay by: Bart Burns & Lois Jakoby	October 31, 1957
Cast: Jane Wyman (Fran)
342	5	"Roadblock Number Seven"	George Waggner	story by: Bruno Fischer teleplay by: George Waggner	November 7, 1957
Cast: Margaret O'Brien
343	6	"A Reasonable Doubt"	Sidney Lanfield	story by: Kenneth Perkins teleplay by: Robert C. Dennis	November 28, 1957
After escaping from prison and man tries to clear himself and find out who set him up.
344	7*	"Death Rides the 12:15"	Unknown	story by: Wade Mosby teleplay by: Kathleen Hite & Joseph Calvelli	December 5, 1957
Cast: Jane Wyman (Amelia)
345	8	"The Perfect Alibi"	Allen H. Miner	story by: Patricia Highsmith teleplay by: Gene Roddenberry	December 12, 1957
In a jealous rage, Howard Keith shoots and kills George Barker. He wanted Barker's job. Cast: Vincent Price
346	9	"The Night After Christmas"	Allen H. Miner	Steve Fisher	December 26, 1957
Cast: John Dehner
347	10	"The Elevator"	Allen H. Miner	story by: Pamela Mason & James Mason teleplay by: Michael Fessier & Philip MacDonald	January 2, 1958
Cast: Linda Darnell
348	11*	"A Widow’s Kiss"	Unknown	Unknown	January 9, 1958
When her daughter is bitten by a black widow spider, a mother searches frantically for blood donors. Cast: Jane Wyman (Marge)
349	12	"Day of Glory"	Allen H. Miner	story by: S. Louis Adams & Oscar Millard teleplay by: Caulfield Fisher & Steve Fisher & Dorothea Frances	January 16, 1958
Damaged in battle and carrying many casualties aboard, the German warship Graf Spee is subject of a battle of wills between its captain and a commander. One officer wants to put into Montevideo to make repairs, the other insists the ship stay in the area and fight on. Cast: Paul Douglas
350	13	"A Guilty Woman"	Allen H. Miner	story by: Glenway Scott teleplay by: Jerome Gruskin	January 30, 1958
After serving many years in prison for the murder of her fiancé, Evelyn is paroled in the custody of her long-time friend Martha, a wealthy widow. Although Martha appears happy to welcome Evelyn into her home, Evelyn begins to notice something new about Martha. Cast: Virginia Grey & Jan Sterling
351	14*	"My Sister Susan"	Unknown	Unknown	February 6, 1958
When Carol Porter arrives in Green Bay to visit a twin sister whom she hasn't seen in some time, she learns that Susan is dead, apparently a murder victim. The police explain that Susan had been involved with a black market racketeer and dope pusher. The only way they can turn up conclusive evidence against this man is for Carol to pose as her twin. Cast: Jane Wyman (Carol/Susan)
352	15	"He Came for the Money"	Allen H. Miner	Frederick Brady	February 13, 1958
A man named Clay, using a lame horse as an excuse, asks for shelter at the ranch of Jim and Martha Benton. He openly observes that Jim and Martha are openly hostile to each other and Martha asks Clay to take her along when he leaves. Cast: Ruth Roman
353	16	"Tunnel Eight"	George Waggner	George Waggner	February 20, 1958
Right after the American Civil War, Dan McGann, a prominent construction engineer, is assigned to help with the construction of the Central Pacific Railroad. When the construction slows down, McGann uncovers the work of saboteurs.
354	17	"Prime Suspect"	Allen H. Miner	story by: Morton Wolson teleplay by: Steve Fisher	February 27, 1958
A police captain is assigned to track down an elusive schizophrenic terrorizing the blonde women of the town. During his investigation, the captain, who was unhappily married to a blonde later killed in a car accident, begins to think he himself may be the attacker. Cast: Claude Akins & William Bendix
355	18	"The Doctor Was a Lady"	William Asher	Bill Manhoff	March 27, 1958
Fran Mitchell and her husband Paul have successful, but conflicting careers. After Fran plans an intimate celebration for their wedding anniversary, Paul tells her that he made plans for a celebration with a client.
356	19*	"Swindler’s Inn"	Sidney Lanfield	Jameson Brewer	April 10, 1958
Hotel housekeeper Cleary Penryn befriends a guest. Cast: Jane Wyman (Cleary Penryn) & Connie Gilchrist
357	20	"The Bravado Touch"	Sidney Lanfield	story by: Richard Carr teleplay by: John Dunkel	April 17, 1958
Cast: Fernando Lamas
358	21	"Man of Taste"	Maurice Geraghty	story by: Philip Freund teleplay by: Philip MacDonald	April 24, 1958
Dr. John Rogers is visited one night by a man begging him for insulin. He convinces the doctor that he is a diabetic and is entitled to the medication so Rogers reluctantly gives him a supply. Cast: Paul Henreid
359	22	"On the Brink"	Unknown	story by: James Yaffe teleplay by: Kathleen Hite	May 1, 1958
Cast: Mercedes McCambridge
360	23	"The Last Test"	Allen H. Miner	John Kneubuhl	May 8, 1958
Cast: Gary Merrill & Marian Seldes
361	24	"Hide and Seek"	Harve Foster	Robert C. Dennis	May 22, 1958
Dan Wilder is a scientific detective who travels about in a car with a trailer attached. The trailer houses a complete laboratory that Dan uses in his work. The prosecutor of a small town has just summoned Dan to help investigate the unusual death of a young girl. Cast: Everett Sloane

== Directors ==
Sidney Lanfield,

Technical Charge of Murder

The Sport

The House on Elm Street

An Echo Out of the Past

Ten Percent

No More Tears

The Marked Bullet

The Little Black Lie

Small Talk

The Pendulum

There Comes One Moment

Robert Florey,

A Place on the Bay

Killer's Pride

John Ford,

Bamboo Cross (1955-Dec-06)

Jerry Hopper

The Wildcatter

Allen H. Miner,

Jacques Tourneur,

The Liberator (1956-Jan-10)

Kirsti (1956-Feb-14)

The Mirror (1956-Feb-28)

Don Weis,

Little Guy

Stephen and Publius Cyrus

The Smuggler

Nailed Down

His Maiden Voyage

The Way to Heaven

Let Yesterday Die

Between Jobs
