= 1964 United States presidential election in Mississippi =

- November 3, 1964

Nominee	Barry Goldwater	Lyndon B. Johnson
Party	Republican	Democratic
Home state	Arizona	Texas
Running mate	William Miller	Hubert Humphrey
Electoral vote	7	0
Popular vote	356,528	52,618
Percentage	87.14%	12.86%

Goldwater
60–70%
70–80%
80–90%
90–100%

The 1964 United States presidential election in Mississippi was held on November 3, 1964, as part of the 1964 United States presidential election, which was held on that day throughout all fifty states and the District of Columbia. Voters chose seven electors, or representatives to the Electoral College, who voted for president and vice president.

Less than 10% of Mississippi's black population were registered voters. Governor Paul B. Johnson Jr. told Mississippians to disobey the Civil Rights Act of 1964. Ultimately, Goldwater won Mississippi with a 74.28 point margin of victory over Johnson, making Mississippi 97% more Republican than the nation and Goldwater the first Republican to win the state since Reconstruction, even outperforming Johnson's 71% margin of victory in the District of Columbia. While Goldwater would suffer a landslide defeat to Johnson in both the national popular vote and Electoral College, his performance in Mississippi was the largest presidential vote share of any Republican presidential nominee ever in any state. Goldwater's victory, alongside Johnson's victory in Rhode Island marked the last time a Presidential nominee won over 80% of the vote in a state.

Over ninety percent of Mississippi's electorate viewed President Johnson as having done a bad job and 96.4 percent opposed the Civil Rights Act, compared to only 54 percent in the antebellum slave states and Oklahoma. Additionally, 87 percent of Mississippi voters, vis-à-vis 48 percent in the South as a whole, believed that President Johnson was failing at countering domestic Communism. This reflected the widespread belief among Mississippi whites that civil rights activists were funded by communists.

== Campaign ==
Neither Governor Johnson nor any other major state or federal politician offered President Johnson any support in his statewide campaign, which was left to inexperienced Greenville lawyer Douglas Wynn. Governor Johnson and four of the state's five Congressmen were silent about supporting Goldwater, though Congressman John Bell Williams supported him openly.

In July, polling suggested Goldwater would receive ninety percent of Mississippi's vote, but this fell to seventy in August and to between sixty and sixty-five in October due to fears that he would abolish the Rural Electrification Administration. By the weekend before election day, University of California political scientist Peter H. Odegard believed that Goldwater would win only Alabama (Note: In Alabama, Goldwater was opposed by a slate of unpledged Democratic electors who would not have voted for President Johnson had they carried the state.) and Mississippi. Mississippi was one of five states that swung more Republican in 1964, alongside Alabama, Louisiana, Georgia, and South Carolina.

Goldwater defeated Johnson by a margin comparable to what had been predicted in the earliest polls, and much greater than predicted immediately before the election. Over-representation of urban areas in polling was blamed for this discrepancy. As of the 2024 presidential election, this is the last time that Claiborne, Holmes and Jefferson counties voted for a Republican presidential candidate. Goldwater received 90% of the white vote in the state.

== Results ==
1964 United States presidential election in Mississippi
Party	Candidate	Votes	Percentage	Electoral votes
Mississippi Republican	Barry Goldwater	356,528	87.14%	7
National Democratic	Lyndon B. Johnson (incumbent)	52,618	12.86%	0
Totals		409,146	100.00%	7
Voter turnout (Voting age)				33.9%

=== Results by county ===
County	Barry Goldwater Republican		Lyndon B. Johnson Democratic		Margin		Total votes cast
County	#	%	#	%	#	%	Total votes cast
Adams	5,900	84.37%	1,093	15.63%	4,807	68.74%	6,993
Alcorn	3,377	63.79%	1,917	36.21%	1,460	27.58%	5,294
Amite	2,742	96.38%	103	3.62%	2,639	92.76%	2,845
Attala	4,409	94.37%	263	5.63%	4,146	88.74%	4,672
Benton	934	79.83%	236	20.17%	698	59.66%	1,170
Bolivar	4,680	86.49%	731	13.51%	3,949	72.98%	5,411
Calhoun	3,224	91.64%	294	8.36%	2,930	83.28%	3,518
Carroll	2,043	95.42%	98	4.58%	1,945	90.84%	2,141
Chickasaw	3,138	91.83%	279	8.17%	2,859	83.66%	3,417
Choctaw	2,096	93.32%	150	6.68%	1,946	86.64%	2,246
Claiborne	1,226	93.59%	84	6.41%	1,142	87.18%	1,310
Clarke	3,591	93.42%	253	6.58%	3,338	86.84%	3,844
Clay	2,848	92.65%	226	7.35%	2,622	85.30%	3,074
Coahoma	4,172	81.23%	964	18.77%	3,208	62.46%	5,136
Copiah	4,506	94.96%	239	5.04%	4,267	89.92%	4,745
Covington	3,033	88.55%	392	11.45%	2,641	77.10%	3,425
DeSoto	2,928	86.40%	461	13.60%	2,467	72.80%	3,389
Forrest	9,291	89.17%	1,128	10.83%	8,163	78.34%	10,419
Franklin	2,211	96.05%	91	3.95%	2,120	92.10%	2,302
George	2,797	92.04%	242	7.96%	2,555	84.08%	3,039
Greene	1,845	89.52%	216	10.48%	1,629	79.04%	2,061
Grenada	3,648	95.92%	155	4.08%	3,493	91.84%	3,803
Hancock	2,550	62.95%	1,501	37.05%	1,049	25.90%	4,051
Harrison	16,301	75.14%	5,393	24.86%	10,908	50.28%	21,694
Hinds	36,831	87.93%	5,058	12.07%	31,773	75.86%	41,889
Holmes	3,115	96.59%	110	3.41%	3,005	93.18%	3,225
Humphreys	1,863	95.69%	84	4.31%	1,779	91.38%	1,947
Issaquena	456	93.06%	34	6.94%	422	86.12%	490
Itawamba	2,140	65.50%	1,127	34.50%	1,013	31.00%	3,267
Jackson	11,357	82.73%	2,371	17.27%	8,986	65.46%	13,728
Jasper	2,994	92.69%	236	7.31%	2,758	85.38%	3,230
Jefferson	1,258	94.80%	69	5.20%	1,189	89.60%	1,327
Jefferson Davis	2,351	90.91%	235	9.09%	2,116	81.82%	2,586
Jones	12,123	85.95%	1,981	14.05%	10,142	71.90%	14,104
Kemper	2,185	91.96%	191	8.04%	1,994	83.92%	2,376
Lafayette	3,202	81.64%	720	18.36%	2,482	63.28%	3,922
Lamar	3,372	90.99%	334	9.01%	3,038	81.98%	3,706
Lauderdale	13,291	89.36%	1,583	10.64%	11,708	78.72%	14,874
Lawrence	2,373	90.95%	236	9.05%	2,137	81.90%	2,609
Leake	4,343	96.23%	170	3.77%	4,173	92.46%	4,513
Lee	5,165	68.19%	2,409	31.81%	2,756	36.38%	7,574
Leflore	5,589	93.63%	380	6.37%	5,209	87.26%	5,969
Lincoln	6,750	93.92%	437	6.08%	6,313	87.84%	7,187
Lowndes	6,135	92.01%	533	7.99%	5,602	84.02%	6,668
Madison	3,283	92.90%	251	7.10%	3,032	85.80%	3,534
Marion	5,469	91.55%	505	8.45%	4,964	83.10%	5,974
Marshall	2,251	86.78%	343	13.22%	1,908	73.56%	2,594
Monroe	5,627	85.10%	985	14.90%	4,642	70.20%	6,612
Montgomery	3,181	95.53%	149	4.47%	3,032	91.06%	3,330
Neshoba	5,431	94.88%	293	5.12%	5,138	89.76%	5,724
Newton	4,735	95.21%	238	4.79%	4,497	90.42%	4,973
Noxubee	1,980	96.59%	70	3.41%	1,910	93.18%	2,050
Oktibbeha	3,795	90.68%	390	9.32%	3,405	81.36%	4,185
Panola	4,002	90.65%	413	9.35%	3,589	81.30%	4,415
Pearl River	4,009	84.51%	735	15.49%	3,274	69.02%	4,744
Perry	1,775	86.42%	279	13.58%	1,496	72.84%	2,054
Pike	6,418	92.20%	543	7.80%	5,875	84.40%	6,961
Pontotoc	2,699	79.36%	702	20.64%	1,997	58.72%	3,401
Prentiss	2,289	69.32%	1,013	30.68%	1,276	38.64%	3,302
Quitman	2,065	86.01%	336	13.99%	1,729	72.02%	2,401
Rankin	7,541	95.78%	332	4.22%	7,209	91.56%	7,873
Scott	4,729	95.21%	238	4.79%	4,491	90.42%	4,967
Sharkey	1,116	89.71%	128	10.29%	988	79.42%	1,244
Simpson	4,949	94.81%	271	5.19%	4,678	89.62%	5,220
Smith	4,045	94.44%	238	5.56%	3,807	88.88%	4,283
Stone	1,776	90.84%	179	9.16%	1,597	81.68%	1,955
Sunflower	4,127	94.27%	251	5.73%	3,876	88.54%	4,378
Tallahatchie	3,126	92.46%	255	7.54%	2,871	84.92%	3,381
Tate	2,390	89.41%	283	10.59%	2,107	78.82%	2,673
Tippah	2,482	71.82%	974	28.18%	1,508	43.64%	3,456
Tishomingo	1,934	66.44%	977	33.56%	957	32.88%	2,911
Tunica	945	90.52%	99	9.48%	846	81.04%	1,044
Union	2,939	70.38%	1,237	29.62%	1,702	40.76%	4,176
Walthall	3,014	95.14%	154	4.86%	2,860	90.28%	3,168
Warren	7,409	81.96%	1,631	18.04%	5,778	63.92%	9,040
Washington	5,611	73.68%	2,004	26.32%	3,607	47.36%	7,615
Wayne	3,539	92.77%	276	7.23%	3,263	85.54%	3,815
Webster	2,884	92.41%	237	7.59%	2,647	84.82%	3,121
Wilkinson	1,473	93.46%	103	6.54%	1,370	86.92%	1,576
Winston	3,922	94.30%	237	5.70%	3,685	88.60%	4,159
Yalobusha	2,385	90.20%	259	9.80%	2,126	80.40%	2,644
Yazoo	4,801	95.92%	204	4.08%	4,597	91.84%	5,005
Totals	356,528	87.14%	52,618	12.86%	303,910	74.28%	409,146

==== Counties that flipped from Unpledged to Republican ====
- Adams
- Bolivar
- Carroll
- Coahoma
- Covington
- Clarke
- Franklin
- Grenada
- George
- Greene
- Humphreys
- Hinds
- Lamar
- Lauderdale
- Marshall
- Lawrence
- Lincoln
- Marion
- Noxubee
- Newton
- Oktibbeha
- Quitman
- Sharkey
- Pearl River
- Perry
- Stone
- Wilkinson
- Wayne
- Webster
- Amite
- Calhoun
- Chickasaw
- Clarke
- Clay
- Copiah
- Issaquena
- Jefferson Davis
- Leake
- Leflore
- Madison
- Montgomery
- Panola
- Pike
- Rankin
- Scott
- Simpson
- Sunflower
- Tallahatchie
- Tate
- Walthall
- Madison
- Marshall
- Wilkinson
- Yalobusha
- Winston
- Yazoo

==== Counties that flipped from Democratic to Republican ====
- Alcorn
- Attala
- Benton
- Choctaw
- Coahoma
- Desoto
- Hancock
- Harrison
- Itawamba
- Jasper
- Jackson
- Jones
- Kemper
- Lafayette
- Lee
- Monroe
- Neshoba
- Pontotoc
- Prentiss
- Smith
- Tippah
- Tishomingo
- Union
- Washington
- Warren

== Works cited ==
- Black, Earl; Black, Merle (1992). The Vital South: How Presidents Are Elected. Harvard University Press. ISBN 0674941306.
