= Jacqueline Courtney =

American actress (1946-2010)

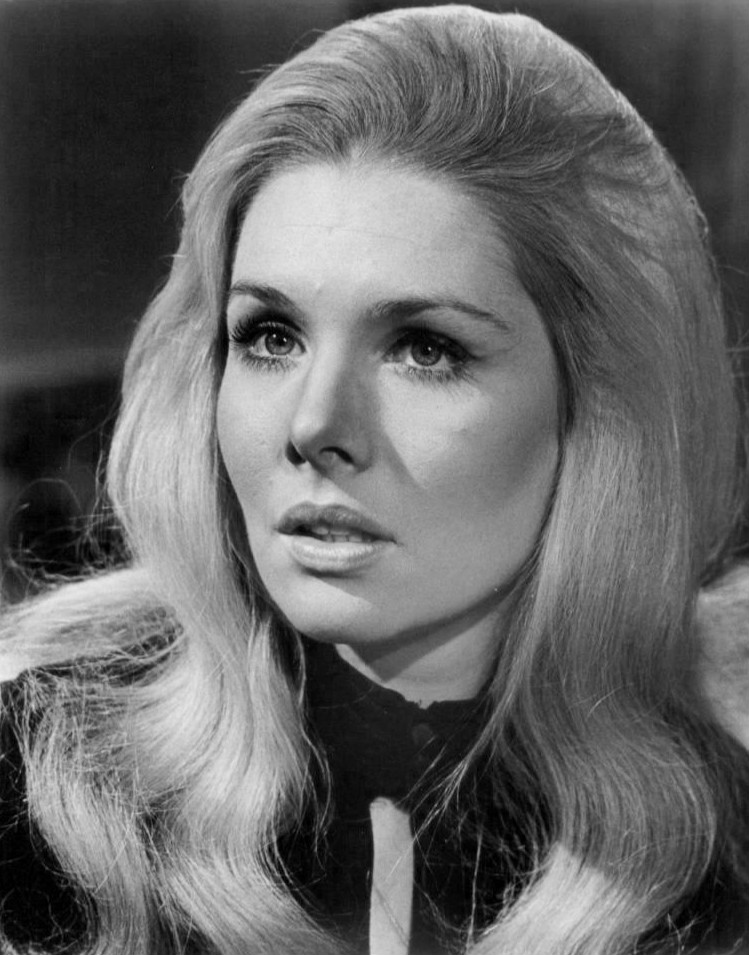
- Courtney as Alice Matthews Frame, 1975.
- Born: Sharon Courtney; September 24, 1946; East Orange, New Jersey, U.S.
- Died: December 20, 2010 (aged 64); Ypsilanti, Michigan, U.S.
- Occupation: Actress
- Years active: 1961–1989
- Spouse: Carl Desiderio (1970–1978)

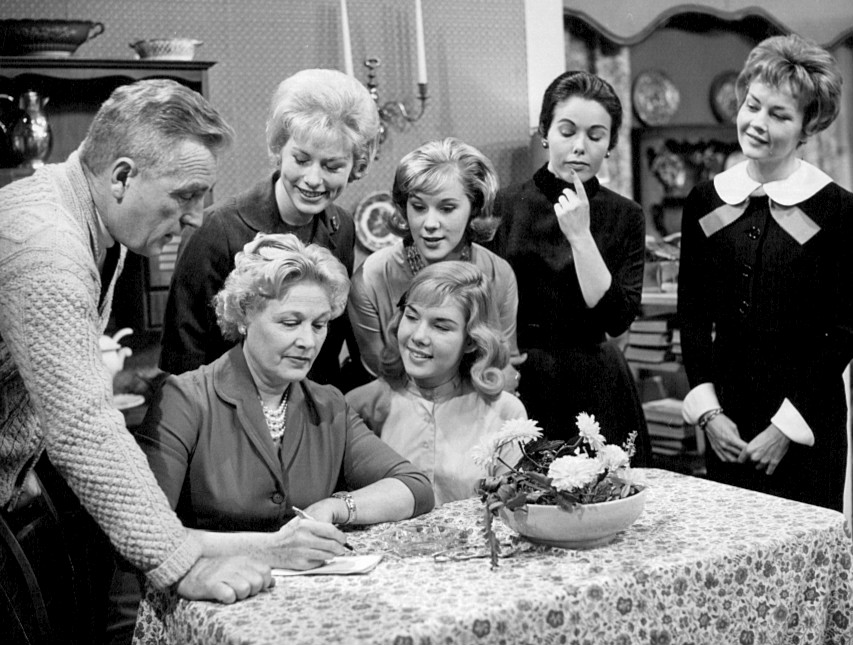
Courtney (seated beside Esther Ralston) in Our Five Daughters (1961)

Jacqueline Courtney (born Sharon Courtney; September 24, 1946 – December 20, 2010) was an American actress best known for her work on daytime soap operas.

Courtney's initial appearance on television came in 1951 when she performed on WAAT in Newark.

After short stints on The Edge of Night and Our Five Daughters, Courtney became famous for her role as Alice Matthews Frame on Another World; she played the role from the show's debut in May 1964 until July 1975. It was during the late 1960s that the Alice/Steve/Rachel triangle became one of the hottest storylines on daytime, pairing her with George Reinholt as the charismatic Steve Frame, and setting her in a rivalry with "bad girl" Rachel Davis, played at the time by Robin Strasser and later by Victoria Wyndham.

In 1975, Courtney and Reinholt were fired, allegedly for "storyline purposes." Head writer Harding Lemay wrote in his memoir, Eight Years in Another World, that Courtney was fired because she was a bad actress who refused to learn lines as written, although she had huge popularity with the soap audience. After being dismissed by producer Paul Rauch, Courtney went on to play Pat Ashley on ABC's One Life to Live, where she was reunited with George Reinholt, playing Tony Lord. In 1979, just as Courtney was involved in a storyline involving a psychotic twin sister, Maggie, Robin Strasser joined the cast as Dorian Lord. Courtney remained on the show until September 1983, when the network fired her just before bringing Paul Rauch in as producer.

Courtney reconciled her differences with Another World and started back on the show as Alice on the 20th anniversary show in May 1984. She played the role until the next year when she was let go due to lack of story for the character. In 1989 she returned for the show's 25th anniversary and for Mackenzie Cory's funeral. After a small role as madame Diane Winston on Loving in 1987, Courtney retired from acting, though she appeared, alongside Reinholt, on the TV special 50 Years of Soaps: An All-Star Celebration in 1994.

Courtney died on December 20, 2010, aged 64, from metastatic melanoma.

In 1973, Courtney received Best Actress, Single Performance, recognition in The First Annual Afternoon TV Writers And Editors Awards.

== Television ==
Year	Title	Role	Notes
1958	The Edge of Night	Kitty DeMarco #2	Daytime serial
1961	The Edge of Night	Viola Smith	Daytime serial
1962	Our Five Daughters	Ann Lee	Daytime serial (contract role)
1962	This Is the Life	Unknown	Episode: "Karen's Fears
1963	The Doctors	Julie Connors	Daytime serial
1963	Route 66	Binky Klein	Episode: "Same Picture, Different Frame"
1964	Route 66	Yvonne	Episode: "Follow the White Dove with the Broken Wing"
1964-1975, 1984-1985, 1989	Another World	Alice Matthews Frame	Daytime serial (contract 1964-1975; contract 1984-1985 and guest 1989)
1975-1983	One Life to Live	Patricia "Pat" Ashley Kendall	Daytime serial (contract role)
1975-1983	One Life to Live	Margaret "Maggie" Ashley	Daytime serial (recurring role 1979-1980; played twin to Pat)
1987-1988	Loving	Madame Diane Winston	Daytime serial (recurring)
