= Millette Alexander =

American actress

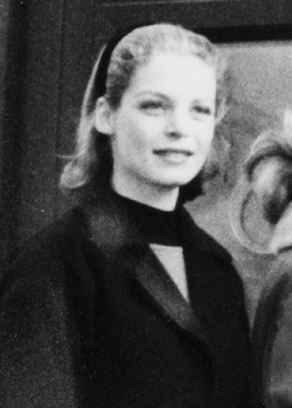
- Alexander in 1961
- Born: August 11, 1933 (age 92); New York City, U.S.
- Education: Northwestern University
- Occupations: Television actress, pianist
- Spouse: James Hammerstein (1962-?)
- Children: Adam, William, Jennifer

Millette Alexander (born August 11, 1933) is an American actress and concert pianist, best known for having played Dr. Sara McIntyre Gantry Werner Blackford Thorpe on The Guiding Light from January 1969 to January 1983. She also is known for her three roles on television's The Edge of Night and for having played Sylvia Hill Suker, R. N. on As the World Turns.

== Early life and education ==
Alexander originally was interested in being a concert pianist, but turned her attention to acting. She majored in theater at Northwestern University.

== Acting career ==
Alexander is best remembered for playing three different characters on The Edge of Night in the 1950s and 1960s. Those characters were named Gail Armstrong (1958–1959), a commercial artist; Laura Hathaway Hillyer (1966–1967), a socialite, married to Orin Hillyer; and lastly, her long-lost identical twin sister, Julie (Hathaway) Jamison Hubbard Hillyer (1967–1968). She later appeared as gun moll Gloria Saxon on the short-lived series, From These Roots. When The Edge of Night was casting its lead female role Sara Lane in 1956, Millette was offered the role, but declined. She did not want to commit to the role which was to be a longtime commitment. She was later to play three very diverse roles (including one of the first dual roles on daytime television) which she enjoyed. She also played on As the World Turns from 1964 to 1966 in the role of nurse, Sylvia Hill Suker.

Alexander assumed the role of Dr. Sara McIntyre #3 on the serial The Guiding Light from January 1969 until January 1983, playing the adoptive mother of character T.J. Werner, a role portrayed by T.J. Hargrave (1974–1978) and later by Kevin Bacon (1980–1981), Christopher Marcantel (1981), and finally by Nigel Reed (1981–1982). Her character was married to Lee Gantry, Dr. Joe Werner, Dean Blackford and Adam Thorpe (father of infamous Roger Thorpe). The role had been created by actress Patricia Roe. Her character was written out of the storyline offscreen when Alexander left the show of her own accord. The move coincided with Alexander's wish to pursue the piano full-time professionally with her piano duo partner Frank Daykin.

== Musical career ==
The piano duo Alexander and Daykin has performed in Paris' Salle Gaveau and New York's Weill Recital Hall at Carnegie Hall (three times) to critical acclaim. They have recorded two CDs for Connoisseur Society: Bach's "Die Kunst der Fuge" (winner of American Record Guide 10 Best New Releases of 1996) and "Paris Originals" (20th-century French masterworks for four hands). The New York Times said: "They make music as one." And the Toronto Citizen, in a review of the Bach CD, hailed them as "surely one of the finest piano duos in the world today."

== Personal life ==
Alexander's children are Adam, William, and Jennifer, and she also has several grandchildren. She was the daughter-in-law of Oscar Hammerstein II before she divorced her husband.

Alexander is the founder of Chamber Music Central, a summer chamber music camp for children in Fairfield County, Connecticut.
