= Not for Women Only =

- Genre: Talk show
- Created by: Barbara Walters
- Presented by: Barbara Walters; Hugh Downs (co-host) '
- Country of origin: United States
- Original language: English

Production
- Producer: Madeline Amgott
- Running time: 30 minutes
- Production company: NBC

Original release
- Release: 1971 – 1976

Related
- "For Women Only" by Aline B. Saarinen (1968-1971)

Not for Women Only is a syndicated American talk show hosted by broadcast journalist Barbara Walters from 1971 to 1976. The half-hour show was the lead-in to Today on its producing station, WNBC (channel 4) in New York. The program was adapted by Walters from For Women Only, a talk show hosted by broadcast journalist and art critic Aline B. Saarinen. Gilda Radner studied tapes of Not for Women Only while creating Baba Wawa, her impression of Walters on Saturday Night Live.

== For Women Only ==
Aline Saarinen, an art and architecture critic who became the third woman correspondent for NBC News, was the original moderator of For Women Only. Each show featured a panel of intellectuals and academics who discussed topics considered to be women's issues, including birth control, abortion, and the generation gap. They also fielded questions from a small studio audience made up of topical experts who were invited to attend the taping. Saarinen left the show in 1971 when she was named chief of NBC's Paris News Bureau.

== Transition ==
After Saarinen left the show, NBC asked Barbara Walters if she was interested in taking over hosting duties. Walters accepted on the condition that the program's coverage was expanded and the show itself was renamed Not for Women Only. The first episode featuring Walters premiered in September 1971.

In addition to changing the name and widening the range of topics addressed on the show, Walters requested the studio audience be seated at round tables rather than in rows, creating a more engaging environment. Audience members were no longer invited experts but members of the public who wrote in for tickets, asking, as Walters put it, "questions the folks watching at home would most want asked." The program was one of the first talk shows to involve audiences in this way.

Madeline Amgott, one of the first women to produce TV news programming, produced episodes of the show. Hugh Downs sometimes appeared alongside Walters as a co-host.

== Topics ==
Walters featured a variety of subjects on the show that she thought would be meaningful for her audience, including mainstream topics related to women's equality. These included "Sensitivity Training," "Stress," "Mastectomy," and "Is the Family Dying?" along with "lighthearted themes" like "The Hostess with the Mostest."

The show also featured notable guests including Mamie Eisenhower, Barbara Bush, Lenore Romney, Martha Mitchell, Phyllis Cerf, and Mollie Parnis.

Whenever ratings slipped, Walters recalls, "we did a program that dealt with some aspect of sex ... We had the most dignified and respected experts address these issues, and our questions were also dignified, but we managed to be candid and therefore exciting in a way few shows were in those days.

== Reception and legacy ==
By the time Not for Women Only had been on the air for six months, the ratings had tripled, and other NBC affiliates were picking up the show. The program was syndicated in 1972 and was soon broadcasting in eighty cities. The New York Times called it one of the most “provocative shows in the entire early morning schedule.”

Walters cites the show as a forerunner of The View. She left the program after signing on to co-host ABC Evening News with Harry Reasoner in 1976. In total, over 1,000 episodes of the show were aired.
