= Harvey Elliott White =

American physicist

Harvey Elliott White (January 28, 1902 – October 3, 1988) was an American physicist and professor at the University of California, Berkeley.

== Early life and education ==
White was born in Parkersburg, West Virginia, but grew up in Pasadena, California. He received an A.B. from Occidental College in 1925 and a Ph.D. from Cornell University in 1929. In 1929–30 he was a National Research Council Fellow at the Physikalische Technische Reichsanstalt in Germany, working on atomic spectroscopy under Friedrich Paschen.

== Career ==
While at Cornell, White was an Instructor in Physics from 1927 to 1929. After receiving his PhD and returning from Germany, he spent his career at the University of California, Berkeley: he was an Assistant Professor of Physics from 1930 to 1938, Associate Professor from 1938 to 1942, and then Professor. In 1958 he became Vice Chairman of the physics department. He designed two new buildings for the department at Berkeley, the second the 525-seat Physical Sciences Lecture Hall, which has a revolving stage divided into 120° sections each with its own chalkboard and demonstration facilities, and was also founder Director of the Lawrence Hall of Science. He retired in 1969.

He was a major proponent of the vector model of the atom, which he used to illustrate quantum mechanics. During World War II, he briefly worked with a group under Ernest Lawrence measuring the vapor pressure of molten uranium, then worked on problems in optics for the war effort.

White was active in instructional television. He participated in Science in Action, an early series produced in the San Francisco Bay Area. In 1956 the Ford Foundation gave him a grant to produce a nine-month high-school physics course with the educational TV station WQED. He presented five half-hour programs each week, 163 in all. In 1958 the Ford Foundation invited him to go to New York to present the inaugural year of NBC's national series called Continental Classroom. It was viewed by millions and aired by over 150 television stations; NBC estimated that the physics series alone had 400,000 viewers on its first airing.

== Honors ==
In 1928 Occidental College awarded White a Sc.D. degree. In 1941 he was awarded a Guggenheim Fellowship for a spectroscopic study of the gases of the Mauna Loa volcano in Hawaii; this was postponed until 1948. For his work on Continental Classroom, he won a Peabody Award, a Sylvania Television Award, and the Oersted Medal for physics teaching.

== Private life ==
White had a lifelong interest in ham radio; his call sign was 6KS.

He married Adeline Dally in 1928; they had three children. White dedicated his textbook Modern College Physics to his son Don. He died in Modesto, California.

== Selected bibliography ==
- White, Harvey Elliott. Introduction to Atomic Spectra (McGraw-Hill, 1934)
- White, Harvey Elliott. Fundamentals of Physical Optics (McGraw-Hill, 1937)
- Jenkins, Francis and White, Harvey Elliott. Fundamentals of Physical Optics (1937); revised ed. Fundamentals of Optics (1950)
- White, Harvey Elliott. Modern College Physics (1948)
- White, Harvey Elliott and White, Donald Harvey, Physics and Music: The Science of Musical Sound (Saunders College/Holt, Rinehart and Winston, 1980; repr. Dover Publications, 2014)
