= Barbara Berjer =

American actress (1920–2002)

- Born: Barbara Elinor Berger; June 12, 1920; Seattle, Washington, U.S.
- Died: October 20, 2002 (aged 82); New York City, U.S.
- Known for: Actress

Barbara Berjer (June 12, 1920 – October 20, 2002) was an American actress.

== Early life ==
Berjer was born Barbara Elinor Berger on June 12, 1920 in Seattle, Washington, the daughter of Knute Eystein Berger (1890-1949), a mechanical engineer originally from Norway, and Thomasina Sutherland (1892-1970), who came from Scotland. She had one older brother, Knute Eystein Berger Jr.

== Career ==
Berjer was well-known to television audiences for her roles in daytime soap operas. Her first was role was that of alcoholic actress Lynn Franklin on From These Roots, which she played from 1959 until the show's end in 1961. (One of her co-stars was actor Henderson Forsythe, who would go on to co-star with Berjer on As the World Turns as Dr. David Stewart, her on-screen son-in-law). This followed with an appearance on the 1962 episode of Armstrong Circle Theatre, "Patterns of Hope" (the episode also featured her future Another World co-star Douglass Watson. She had a small role as a wife in a 1963 episode of The Doctors before joining The Edge of Night in the role of Irene Eagon Wheeler, which she played from 1964 till the following year.

Following her departure from that show, she joined the cast of As the World Turns as the fifth Claire English. During her time on the show, Claire dealt with widowhood, remarrying, the fallout of her husband having an affair with a younger woman and alcoholism. She played the role until 1971, when the character was killed off. Years later, Berjer's co-star Eileen Fulton, who portrayed Claire's love rival Lisa) revealed in an interview that Berjer's exit came as the result of producers realizing that the character of Claire had become a great-grandmother (her on-screen grandson Dan Stewart had been rapidly aged to adulthood and had just had a child of his own). Producers did not like the idea of her character being a great-grandmother and Claire was killed off as a result. This incident led to Fulton having the now-infamous "granny clause" placed in her contract to protect herself (the clause stated that the writers would not be able to make the character of Lisa a grandmother).

Immediately after leaving, Berjer was cast in the role of Barbara Norris Thorpe on Guiding Light (taking over the role from Augusta Dabney). She played the role from 1971 to 1981, with a brief reprisal for a few episodes in 1989, and then on a recurring basis from 1995 to 1996. In 1983, she had a one-day appearance on All My Children as the secretary Erica Kane talks to in vain in an effort to reach Adam Chandler. In 1985, Berjer started playing Scottish nanny Bridget Connell on Another World, a role she continued to play until 1996, when the character was killed off. Berjer continued to make guest appearances as Bridget's ghost until 1998. Berjer is notable for being one of the few actresses to be featured on two daytime soap operas at the same time (Guiding Light and Another World). In 1997, Berjer guest-starred on Law & Order as Mrs. Gannett in the episode "Passion".

Early in her career, her surname was often mispronounced as "burger", so she changed it to "Berjer".

== Personal life ==
Berjer married Lee Foley in 1942. The two met while Berjer was attending Cornish College of the Arts to study ballet; Foley was her choreographer. They had one son, Thomas Michael Foley.

== Death ==
Berjer died of pneumonia in New York City on October 20, 2002. At the time of her death, she was survived by her son Thomas Michael Foley of Manhattan; her sister-in-law, Margi Berger of Bainbridge Island, Washington;, and several nieces, nephews and cousins.
