= The Lady of Glenwith Grange =

- Short story by Wilkie Collins
- Country: United Kingdom
- Genre(s): Mystery fiction

Publication
- Published in: After Dark
- Publisher: Smith, Elder & Co.
- Media type: Print
- Publication date: 1856

"The Lady of Glenwith Grange" is a novella by the nineteenth-century English writer Wilkie Collins. The story was first published as one of six short stories by Collins in a collection entitled After Dark, published in 1856; it was his first collection of short stories.

In the story, a French aristocrat living a peaceful married life in the English countryside is revealed to be an imposter.

== After Dark ==
The stories in After Dark are linked by a narrative framework. At the beginning and end of the book are "Leaves from Leah's Diary": William Kerby, a travelling portrait-painter, is in danger of losing his sight, and is required by his doctor to cease painting for a while. His wife Leah realizes that destitution threatens. He is a good story-teller, and Leah has the idea of writing down his stories and publishing them.

All the other stories were first published in Household Words, and for this volume a prologue was added to each story. This story, entitled "The Angler's Story of the Lady of Glenwith Grange" for this collection, similarly has a prologue: Garthwaite, a gentleman-farmer who has commissioned Kerby to paint a picture of his bull, takes Kerby fishing while the bull is in an unmanageable temper. They come near Glenwith Grange; Garthwaite knows Miss Ida Welwyn, a middle-aged woman who lives there, and they visit the house. Kerby is impressed by the melancholy nature of Miss Welwyn and the out-of-date interior. Garthwaite, as he is angling after their visit, tells Kerby the story of the Welwyn family.

== Story summary ==
Since childhood, Ida is devoted to looking after her younger sister Rosamond, as she had promised to their mother before she died, soon after Rosamond was born. Their father is wealthy, and some years later the family spend a winter in the high society of Paris. Rosamond becomes engaged to Baron Franval, a French aristocrat. He has recently returned to France after several years abroad, and has received an inheritance. Ida, who still puts Rosamond's interests before all else, dislikes and distrusts the Baron, although he has an apparently pleasant personality.

The married life of the Baron and Rosamond at Glenwith Grange is peaceful; however when a French provincial newspaper, which he receives regularly, fails to arrive one day his mood changes, and he leaves to make enquiries. While he is away a visitor arrives, received by Ida who lives with the couple; he is an agent of the French police, and has withheld the newspaper the Baron was expecting; the paper informed that Baron Franval has arrived in France from overseas. The French police have ascertained that this supposed imposter is genuine, and that Rosamond's husband is probably Monbrun, a fraudster who resembles Franval.

The identity of Rosamond's husband is proved soon afterwards: he returns and, while asleep, the French agent finds the branded mark that Monbrun was given when he was a convict. The shock puts Rosamond, who is pregnant, into premature labour; the child is born with mental disabilities, and Rosamond dies. Ida remains to look after the child.
