= Aline B. Saarinen =

American architecture critic (1914–1972)

- Saarinen, c. 1964
- Born: Aline Milton Bernstein; March 25, 1914; New York City, U.S.
- Died: July 13, 1972 (aged 58); New York City, U.S.
- Education: Ethical Culture Fieldston School (1931)
- Alma mater: Vassar College (AB); NYU Institute of Fine Arts (MA)
- Occupations: Art critic, television journalist
- Spouses: Joseph H. Louchheim (m. 1935; div. 1951) Eero Saarinen (m. 1954; died 1961)
- Children: 3

Aline Bernstein Saarinen (March 25, 1914 – July 13, 1972) was an American art and architecture critic, author and television journalist.

== Early life and education ==
Aline Bernstein was born on March 25, 1914, in New York City, the daughter of Irma (Lewyn) and Allen Milton Bernstein, both of German Jewish descent. Her father was the head of an investment firm and an amateur painter. Her mother also painted, and she was encouraged to take an interest in the arts.

In 1931, she graduated from the Ethical Culture Fieldston School in The Bronx, and then attended Vassar College, where she studied art and developed an interest in journalism. She graduated in 1935 with an A.B. degree. On June 17, 1935, she married Joseph H. Louchheim, a public welfare administrator. The same year, she enrolled New York University Institute of Fine Arts, where she studied the history of architecture and graduated with an A.M. degree in 1941. She had two sons during this period, Donald in 1937, and Harry in 1939.

== Career ==
=== Art and architecture critic ===
She obtained a job with Art News magazine in 1944, and was the magazine's managing editor from 1946 to 1948. From 1948 to 1953, she was associate art editor and critic at The New York Times and published articles on art and cultural trends in various magazines. She frequently wrote about modern architecture and the link between modern art and architecture.

Aline divorced Joseph Louchheim in 1951. In January 1953, she went to Detroit to interview the Finnish-born architect Eero Saarinen, who had recently been acclaimed for his General Motors Technical Center. They were attracted to each other at once. Her profile of Saarinen, titled Now Saarinen the Son, appeared in The New York Times Magazine on April 23, 1953. She married Saarinen in 1954 and moved to Bloomfield Hills, Michigan, where his firm had its headquarters.

After their marriage, Aline stopped writing on architecture owing to potential conflict of interest. She continued writing for The New York Times as an associate art critic under the byline Aline B. Saarinen. She became Head of Information Service at Eero Saarinen & Associates, a job that included bringing her husband's work to the attention of magazine editors with whom she had once worked. In December of that year, they had a son, Eames. In 1957, Aline was awarded a Guggenheim Fellowship during which she wrote the best selling book The Proud Possessors, a collection of biographies of American art collectors. Eero died suddenly in 1961. Aline stayed with the firm while unfinished projects were completed. In 1962, she edited the book Eero Saarinen on His Work.

=== Television ===
In 1962, Saarinen first appeared on television, discussing art. The show was successful, leading to demand for more appearances. In the fall of 1963, she became art and architecture editor for NBC's Sunday show, and art critic for their Today show. She discussed a broad range of topics with a lively and original style. She also made many specials and documentaries, including The Art of Collecting, which aired in January 1964. In October 1964, she became a correspondent for NBC News, the third NBC woman reporter after Pauline Frederick and Nancy Dickerson. Again, she covered a broad range of subjects.

Saarinen was moderator on the show For Women Only, in which a panel answered questions from the audience, including ones on subjects such as birth control and abortion. During the 1960s, she served on the Design Advisory Committee of the Federal Aviation Administration, the U.S. Commission of Fine Arts from 1963 to 1971, and the New York State Council of the Arts. In 1970, Saarinen prepared a one-hour NBC program in celebration of the Metropolitan Museum of Art Centennial.

In 1971, she was made head of NBC's Paris news bureau, making her the first woman to head a network's foreign bureau. She held this position until her death from a brain tumor on July 13, 1972.

== Recognition ==
Aline Saarinen was given the International Award for Best Foreign Criticism at the Venice Biennale in 1951. She received the Frank Jewett Mather Award for best newspaper art criticism in 1953, and the American Federation of Arts Award for best newspaper criticism in 1956. In 1964, she turned down an offer from President Lyndon B. Johnson of the post of ambassador to Finland. She was awarded an honorary degree by the University of Michigan in 1964 and another by the Russell Sage College in 1967.

== Bibliography ==
- Aline Bernstein Louchheim (1945). Five thousand years of art: survey of the Metropolitan's collections. Art News.
- Aline Bernstein Louchheim (1946). 5000 years of art in western civilization. Howell, Soskin.
- Aline (Bernstein) Louchheim (1946). Sports, pastimes and pictures: men at play observed by artists of four centuries. Art foundation.
- Aline B. Louchheim (1947). Children should be seen: painters since the Renaissance portray the changing aspects of childhood until today. The Art Foundation.
- Aline Bernstein Saarinen (1958). The proud possessors: the lives, times, and tastes of some adventurous American art collectors. Random House.
- Jacob Lawrence, Aline B. Saarinen (1960). Jacob Lawrence. American Federation of Arts.
- Eero Saarinen, Aline Bernstein Saarinen (1962). Eero Saarinen on his work. Yale Univ. Pr.
- Eero Saarinen, Aline (Bernstein) Saarinen (1964). Challenge to an architect: Deere and Company Administrative Center (statements by Eero Saarinen). Yale University Press.
- Aline B. Saarinen (1977). I grandi collezionisti americani: dagli inizi a Peggy Guggenheim. Einaudi.
