= Fireside Theatre =

American anthology TV series (1949–1958)

- Also known as: Jane Wyman Presents the Fireside Theatre; Jane Wyman Theatre; The Jane Wyman Show; Jane Wyman Presents
- Genre: Anthology drama
- Written by: Ray Bradbury; Blake Edwards; William Froug; Kathleen Hite; Quinn Martin; Madelyn Pugh; Gene Roddenberry; Rod Serling; Aaron Spelling
- Directed by: William Asher; Fred Coe; Blake Edwards; Robert Florey; John Ford; Sidney Lanfield; Allen H. Miner; Ozzie Nelson; Oscar Rudolph; Robert Stevenson; Jacques Tourneur; Don Weis
- Presented by: Frank Wisbar (1952–1953); Gene Raymond (1953–1955); Jane Wyman (1955–1958)
- Country of origin: United States
- Original language: English
- No. of seasons: 10
- No. of episodes: 361(268/93) (list of episodes)

Production
- Producers: William Asher; Jack Bernhard; John Houseman; Quinn Martin; John Reinhardt; William P. Rousseau; Frank Wisbar; Eva Wolas; Jane Wyman
- Camera setup: Single-camera
- Running time: 30 mins
- Production companies: General Television Enterprises; Hal Roach Studios; Lewman Inc./Revue Studios (1955–58)

Original release
- Network: NBC
- Release: April 5, 1949 – May 22, 1958

Fireside Theatre (later known as Jane Wyman Presents the Fireside Theatre, Jane Wyman Theatre, The Jane Wyman Show and Jane Wyman Presents) is an American anthology drama series that ran on NBC from 1949 to 1958, and was the first successful filmed series on American television. Early episodes (1949–1955) were low-budget and often based on public domain stories. While the series was dismissed by critics, it remained among the top ten most popular shows for most of this period. For the 8th season (1955–1956), Jane Wyman became the host and producer. The series was only the second filmed prime time network drama anthology to be hosted by a woman. Later episodes (1955–1958) were written by important freelance television writers, such as Rod Serling, Aaron Spelling and Gene Roddenberry. It predates the only major pioneer of filmed television production in the United States, I Love Lucy, by two years.

== Overview ==
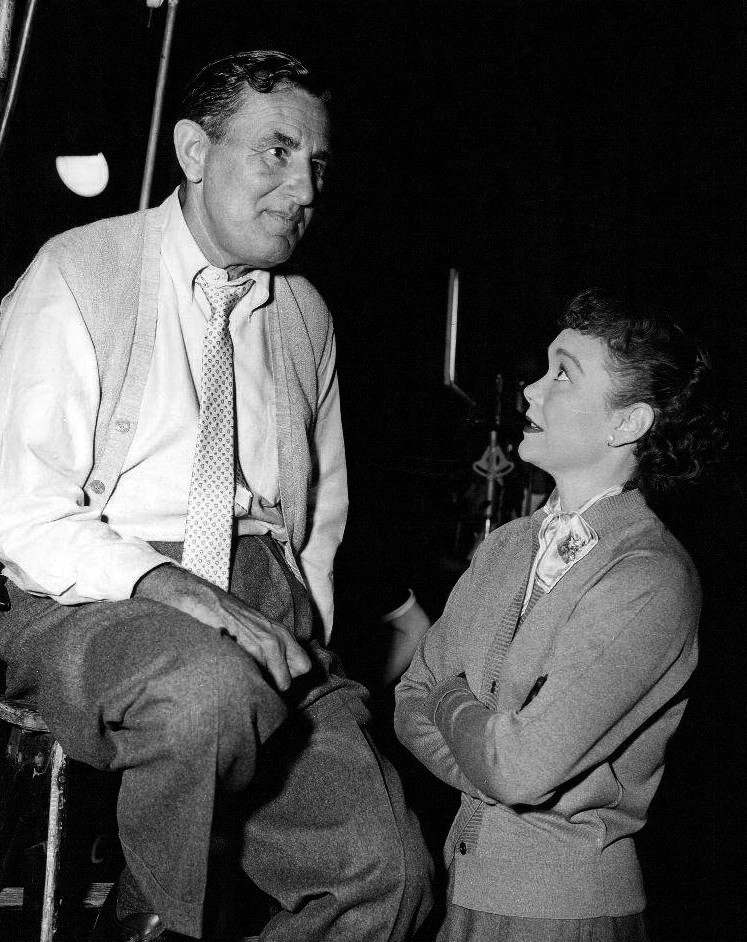
Director Sidney Lanfield and Jane Wyman on the set of The Jane Wyman Show (1955)

Fireside Theatre was created by Frank Wisbar, who also wrote and directed many episodes. He was the producer and director for the program's first six years, resigning on December 6, 1954, and leaving when his contract expired on February 15, 1955. From 1952 to 1958, the program was presented by a host. This role was first filled by Wisbar (1952–1953), then by Gene Raymond (1953–1955), and finally by the person most associated with the series in the public mind, Jane Wyman (1955–1958).

On April 2, 1955 series' sponsor P&G and NBC announced a deal with MCA Inc. for Wyman to assume the role of host. During the period first-run episodes were produced by Wyman’s production company Lewman Ltd. the series ultimately became known as The Jane Wyman Show. Wyman acted in 51 of the 93 episodes she hosted. Episodes rerun weekdays on ABC as part of its 1961-62 and 1962-63 daytime schedule ran under the title Jane Wyman Presents.

== Episodes ==
Season	Episodes	Originally released	
Season	Episodes	First released	Last released
1	12	April 5, 1949	June 28, 1949
2	41	September 6, 1949	June 27, 1950
3	46	August 29, 1950	August 21, 1951
4	44	August 28, 1951	June 24, 1952
5	39	September 30, 1952	June 30, 1953
6	44	September 1, 1953	June 29, 1954
7	43	September 7, 1954	June 28, 1955
8	35	August 30, 1955	April 24, 1956
9	34	August 28, 1956	June 11, 1957
10	24	September 26, 1957	May 22, 1958

=== Cast ===
As an anthology series, Fireside Theatre had no regular cast, just a series of guest stars:

- Claude Akins
- Keith Andes
- John Archer
- Barry Atwater
- Phyllis Avery
- Parley Baer
- Gene Barry
- Frances Bavier
- William Bendix
- Richard Beymer
- Whit Bissell
- Gloria Blondell
- Neville Brand
- Frank Cady
- Rod Cameron
- Macdonald Carey
- Jack Carson
- Jeannie Carson
- Anthony Caruso
- George Chandler
- Dane Clark
- Gary Clarke
- Imogene Coca
- Hans Conried
- Jeanne Cooper
- Robert O. Cornthwaite
- Joseph Cotten
- Linda Darnell
- John Dehner
- Albert Dekker
- Reginald Denny
- Francis De Sales
- Lawrence Dobkin
- John Doucette
- Paul Douglas
- Stephen Dunne
- Dan Duryea
- Vince Edwards
- Jack Elam
- Richard Erdman
- Bill Erwin
- Felicia Farr
- William Fawcett
- Frank Ferguson
- Joe Flynn
- Bruce Gordon
- Dabbs Greer
- Virginia Gregg
- Virginia Grey
- Kevin Hagen
- Don Haggerty
- Charles Herbert
- Louis Jean Heydt
- William Hopper
- Vivi Janiss
- Carolyn Jones
- Henry Jones
- Brian Keith
- Gail Kobe
- Jack Kruschen
- Fernando Lamas
- Charles Lane
- John Larch
- Peter Lawford
- Peter Leeds
- Yvonne Lime
- Betty Lynn
- Hugh Marlowe
- Lee Marvin
- Mercedes McCambridge
- Jayne Meadows
- Ralph Meeker
- Gary Merrill
- Eve Miller
- George Montgomery
- Dennis Morgan
- Jeff Morrow
- Don Murray
- Burt Mustin
- Jeanette Nolan
- Margaret O'Brien
- Doris Packer
- Larry Pennell
- Vincent Price
- Maudie Prickett
- Ainslie Pryor
- Stuart Randall
- Gilman Rankin
- Lydia Reed
- Addison Richards
- Peter Mark Richman
- Roy Roberts
- Gilbert Roland
- Ruth Roman
- Herbert Rudley
- Roberta Shore
- Everett Sloane
- Arthur Space
- Aaron Spelling
- Jan Sterling
- Craig Stevens
- Karl Swenson
- Nita Talbot
- Gloria Talbott
- Tom Tryon
- Ann Tyrrell
- Minerva Urecal
- Herb Vigran
- Beverly Washburn
- Jesse White
- Frank Wilcox
- Cara Williams
- Marie Windsor
- Fay Wray
- Keenan Wynn

== Reception ==
=== Critical response ===
1949-1954, Seasons 1-8

Billboard praised an episode titled "The Lottery", saying that the cast "all turned in taut, exciting performances to make Lottery a real winner". Unlike most episodes of the series, this episode aired live.

In 1954, Billboard’s “3rd Annual TV Program and Talent Awards” listed it as the fourth-best filmed network drama series, ahead of the General Electric Theater; however, Billboard's list excluded "mystery" shows (which was a separate list topped by Dragnet).

One of Fireside Theatre's most notable early offerings was a 1951 condensed version of Charles Dickens's A Christmas Carol, featuring Ralph Richardson as Ebenezer Scrooge for the only time on American television. He later recreated the role on a spoken word Caedmon Records LP album, with Paul Scofield as narrator. It has since been released on CD.

The Doubleday Book Club also ran a playscripts club called The Fireside Theatre.

1955-1958, Seasons 8-10

=== Ratings ===
Fireside Theatre became a hit for NBC, always in the Top 30 shows at the end of each TV season, until the 1956–1957 season, when its viewership began to decline. After this, it never returned to the Top 30.

Seasonal rankings (based on average total viewers per episode) of Fireside Theatre on NBC. (Note: In the United States, each network television season starts in September and ends in late May, which coincides with the completion of May sweeps.)

Season	TV season	Ranking	Viewers (in millions)
3rd	1950–1951	#2	5.365
4th	1951–1952	#7	6.594
5th	1952–1953	#10	8.282
6th	1953–1954	#9	9.464
7th	1954–1955	#20	9.547
8th	1955–1956	#24	10.121

1955-1958, Seasons 8-10

In the first year of Wyman's three-year deal to produce and host the 8th, 9th and 10th seasons of, what would ultimately become, The Jane Wyman Show, her series' lead-in, the new color incarnation of Texaco Star Theatre, continued to decline in the ratings for the 1955-56 season falling behind The Phil Silvers Show on CBS in its timeslot and dropping out of the top 30. It was cancelled in 1956 after eight seasons. By contrast the Wyman-hosted Fireside Theatre added an average half a million viewers per episode(the largest audience in the series history) and finished in the top 25 as the #1 show in its timeslot. Wyman's most direct competitor for the coveted female demographic The Loretta Young Show, also sponsored by P&G on NBC, didn't crack the top 30 shows for the 1955-56 season (it had been #27 in the season prior).
