= After Dark (short story collection) =

Book by Wilkie Collins

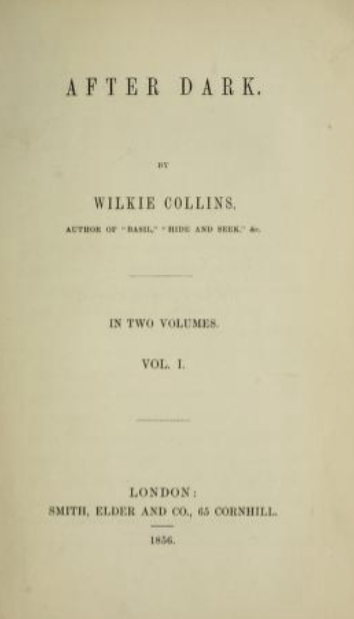
- Title page for After Dark (1856)
- Author: Wilkie Collins
- Language: English
- Genre: Mystery fiction Short stories
- Publisher: Smith, Elder & Co.
- Publication date: 1856
- Publication place: United Kingdom
- Media type: Print (hardback)
- OCLC: 4341884

After Dark is a collection of six short stories by Wilkie Collins, first published in 1856. It was the author's first collection of short stories. Five of the stories were previously published in Household Words, a magazine edited by Charles Dickens.

== Structure ==
The stories are linked by a narrative framework.

At the beginning and end of the book are "Leaves from Leah's Diary": William Kerby, a travelling portrait-painter, is in danger of losing his sight, and is required by his doctor to cease painting for a while. His wife Leah realizes that destitution threatens. He is a good story-teller, and Leah has the idea of writing down his stories and publishing them.

Each story has a prologue, which was added to the original story that appeared in Household Words.

== Contents ==
- "The Traveller's Story of a Terribly Strange Bed", first published as "A Terribly Strange Bed" in Household Words in 1852.
- "The Lawyer's Story of a Stolen Letter", first published as "The Fourth Poor Traveller" in "The Seven Poor Travellers", a group of stories by several authors in the Christmas 1854 edition of Household Words.
- "The French Governess's Story of Sister Rose", first published as "Sister Rose" in Household Words in April 1855.
- "The Angler's Story of the Lady of Glenwith Grange", first published in this volume.
- "The Nun's Story of Gabriel's Marriage", first published as "Gabriel's Marriage" in Household Words in April 1853.
- "The Professor's Story of the Yellow Mask", first published as "The Yellow Mask" in Household Words in July 1855.
