= Madeline Amgott =

American television news producer

- Born: Madeline Michelle Barotz; August 31, 1921; Bronx, New York
- Died: July 19, 2014 (aged 92); Manhattan
- Education: Brooklyn College
- Occupations: television producer, newspaper bureau
- Known for: Calendar; The Big News; Not for Women Only; 60 Minutes; 30 Minutes

Madeline Rochelle Amgott (August 31, 1921 – July 19, 2014) was an American television news producer. A pioneer of early television news, Amgott was one of the first, and only, women to produce television news shows during the mid-1950s and 1960s.

== Life ==
Amgott was born Madeline Rochelle Barotz on August 31, 1921, in the Bronx, New York. She graduated from Brooklyn College.

Amgott worked at the Washington D.C. bureau of The San Diego Union before moving back to New York City. In 1955, she joined the staff of CBS News. Amgott helped create Calendar, CBS daytime show aimed at women, which was hosted by Harry Reasoner and Mary Fickett from 1961 to 1963. She left Calendar after being turned down for an open producer on the show.

Amgott was next hired by as a television news producer at WABC-TV in New York. She produced The Big News, which is believed to have been the first major network affiliate news show made without network news staff. The show aired on WABC. During the 1970s, Amgott produced episodes of the NBC talk show, Not for Women Only, which was hosted by Barbara Walters.

She later returned to CBS where she produced episodes of 60 Minutes, as well as episodes of 30 Minutes, a half-hour children's format of 60 Minutes which aired on Saturdays from 1978 to 1982. Amgott's work on 30 Minutes earned her three Daytime Emmy Awards.

Amgott produced the 1987 PBS mini-series, In Search of the Constitution, hosted by Bill Moyers. She also produced segments for Morning News on CBS. Amgott produced a television film on Hans Hofmann, which aired on PBS in 2003.

Madeline Amgott died from lymphoma in Manhattan, New York City, on July 19, 2014, at age 92.
