= A Terribly Strange Bed =

- Short story by Wilkie Collins

Text available at Wikisource
- Country: United Kingdom
- Genres: Mystery fiction, Horror

Publication
- Published in: Household Words
- Publication type: Magazine
- Publisher: Bradbury and Evans
- Media type: Print
- Publication date: 24 April 1852

"A Terribly Strange Bed" is a short story by Wilkie Collins, first published in 1852 in Household Words, a magazine edited by Charles Dickens.

It was written near the beginning of his writing career, his first published book having appeared in 1848. Collins met Dickens in 1851, and this story was the first contribution by Collins to Household Words. After several more pieces for the magazine, he became a paid member of staff in 1856.

In the story, an English visitor to a gambling house in Paris stays overnight in the building, and is nearly killed by a specially constructed bed.

== The story in After Dark ==
The story was one of six short stories by Collins in his collection entitled After Dark, published in 1856. In the preface, he acknowledged the painter W. S. Herrick as his source for the idea of this story.

The stories in After Dark are linked by a narrative framework. At the beginning and end of the book are "Leaves from Leah's Diary": William Kerby, a travelling portrait-painter, is in danger of losing his sight, and is required by his doctor to cease painting for a while. His wife Leah realizes that destitution threatens. He is a good story-teller, and Leah has the idea of writing down his stories and publishing them.

Each story has a prologue, added to the original story that appeared in Household Words. In the prologue of this story, now entitled "The Traveller's Story of a Terribly Strange Bed", Kerby is in a hotel in Liverpool, making a portrait in chalk of Faulkner, who is staying there while waiting to sail to Brazil. Kerby has with him a portfolio containing sketches he made in Paris, which interests Faulkner; one of the sketches is of a back street, which he recognizes, and he tells Kerby of his adventure in a house in that street.

== Story summary ==
The narrator (Faulkner) is staying in Paris, after finishing his college education, and is exploring the amusements there. As a change from respectable establishments, he visits a low gambling house, where a variety of unsavoury characters are playing Rouge et Noir. He starts to win a great amount, which causes great interest and excitement among the other players. The atmosphere of the room, as a contrast to the respectable establishments he visited before, is powerfully described. This leads to a colourful depiction of a dissolute-looking elderly man, formerly a soldier in the French army, who encourages him to continue.

The narrator continues to win, until the bank is broken and playing ends. The old soldier advises him to keep his winnings safely tied in a handkerchief, and they drink champagne with the entire company. The old soldier brings coffee for them both, as the other players leave; he seems anxious that the narrator should not be drunk when he goes home with his winnings. The narrator feels giddy and the old soldier advises him to stay there overnight, as it would not be safe for him to go home.

The bedroom where he is to stay, on the first floor, is a peaceful contrast to the atmosphere below, but he is aware of possible dangers. He locks the door of his room and lies on the bed, which is a four-poster bed, with his winnings under the pillow. He cannot sleep. He tries to distract his mind by studying the items in the room, which include a wash-stand, chairs and a picture on the wall; thus a convincing image of the room is given to the reader. The moonlight in the room brings to his mind a moonlit evening after a picnic years ago, which he thought he had forgotten.

This recollection is brought to an end when he becomes aware that the top of the bed is slowly descending. He moves away as the canopy, which contains a mattress, approaches and reaches the bed, evidently to suffocate the occupant. It is moved by a wooden screw which goes through the ceiling. After a few minutes the canopy gradually returns to its original position.

He realizes his coffee was drugged, but too strongly for him to sleep as intended. He escapes from the room, which is on the first floor, through the window and down a drainpipe. He goes to a prefecture of police, where a sub-prefect, who happens to be discussing a recent murder with colleagues, becomes quickly interested in the narrator's story. He returns with the sub-prefect and several assistants, who arrest the residents of the gambling house and investigate the machinery which moved the bed canopy.

The sub-prefect speculates that many individuals found drowned in the Seine were victims of the gambling house, with fake suicide notes. The old soldier was master of the gambling house; he is one of several later brought to justice.

== Adaptations ==
The story has been adapted to TV in the US anthology series Thriller, presented by Boris Karloff (1960-61, episode 25), the British TV show Orson Welles Great Mysteries, with Edward Albert as Faulkner and Rupert Davies as Lemerle, the old French ex-soldier. It was also adapted as a Polish TV film in 1967 with Wiesław Gołas in a main role.
