= Leo Townsend =

American football and basketball coach

Coaching career (HC unless noted)

Football
- 1932–1935: North Carolina Central

Basketball
- 1935–1936: North Carolina Central

Head coaching record
- Overall: 16–17 (football); 0–11 (basketball)

Leo Townsend was an American football and basketball coach. He served as the head football coach at the North Carolina College for Negroes—now known as North Carolina Central University—in Durham, North Carolina four seasons, from 1932 to 1935, compiling a record of 16–17. Townsend was also the head basketball coach at North Carolina Central for one season, in 1935–36, tallying a mark of 0–11.

== Head coaching record ==
=== Football ===
Year	Team	Overall	Conference	Standing	Bowl/playoffs
North Carolina College Eagles (Colored Intercollegiate Athletic Association) (1932–1935)
1932	North Carolina College	3–5	3–5	6th	
1933	North Carolina College	4–4	4–4	8th	
1934	North Carolina College	4–5	4–4	7th	
1935	North Carolina College	5–3	5–2	5th	
North Carolina College:		16–17	16–15		
Total:		16–17			
