= 1961–62 United States network television schedule (late night) =

These are the late-night Monday–Friday schedules for all three networks for the 1961–62 season. All times are Eastern and Pacific.

Talk shows are highlighted in yellow, local programming is white.

The season was Jack Paar's final as a late-night host on NBC. His last show in the 11:15 PM time slot was at the end of March 1962. Following his departure, the program continued as The Tonight Show, featuring interim hosts including Art Linkletter, Joey Bishop, and Robert Cummings.

Meanwhile, ABC News Final aired at 11:00 PM ET, featuring "working reporters" on location.

== Schedule ==
		11:00 PM	11:30 PM	12:00 AM	12:30 AM	1:00 AM	1:30 AM	2:00 AM	2:30 AM	3:00 AM	3:30 AM	4:00 AM	4:30 PM	5:00 AM	5:30 AM
ABC		ABC News Final	Local	Local programming or sign-off
CBS		local programming or sign-off
NBC	Fall	11:15 PM: The Jack Paar Show/The Best Of Paar (F)				local programming or sign-off
NBC	Spring	11:15 PM: The Tonight Show				local programming or sign-off

Note: After Jack Paar's departure on March 29, 1962, guest hosts filled in on The Tonight Show until Johnny Carson's contract with ABC ended in September, after which he became the permanent host.

== By network ==
=== ABC ===
New Series

- ABC News Final

=== NBC ===
Returning Series

- The Jack Paar Show
- The Best Of Paar

New Series

- The Tonight Show
