= Allen H. Miner =

American television director and screenwriter (1917–2004)

- Born: Allen Harris Miner; October 18, 1917; Philadelphia, Pennsylvania, U.S.
- Died: January 4, 2004 (aged 86); San Marcos, California, U.S.
- Education: Yale University
- Occupations: Director, screenwriter

Allen Harris Miner (October 18, 1917 – January 4, 2004) was an American director and screenwriter. He served as a photographer during World War II. Miner then directed and wrote for television programs including Perry Mason, Colgate Theatre, Mission: Impossible, The Twilight Zone, The Jane Wyman Show, Route 66, The Lawless Years, Tales of Wells Fargo, Riverboat and Wagon Train.

Miner died on January 4, 2004 of natural causes in San Marcos, California, at the age of 86.
