= 1962–63 United States network television schedule (late night) =

These are the late-night Monday–Friday schedules for all three networks for the 1962–63 season. All times are Eastern and Pacific.

Talk shows are highlighted in yellow, local programming is white.

On October 2, 1962, Johnny Carson debuted as the new host of the Tonight Show, in the 11:15 PM time slot.

== Schedule ==
	11:00 PM	11:30 PM	12:00 AM	12:30 AM	1:00 AM	1:30 AM	2:00 AM	2:30 AM	3:00 AM	3:30 AM	4:00 AM	4:30 PM	5:00 AM	5:30 AM
ABC	Local	ABC News Final	Local programming or sign-off
CBS	local programming or sign-off
NBC	11:15 PM: The Tonight Show Starring Johnny Carson				local programming or sign-off

Johnny Carson becomes the host of The Tonight Show on October 1, 1962.

== By network ==
=== ABC ===
Returning Series

- ABC News Final

=== NBC ===
New Series

- The Tonight Show Starring Johnny Carson

Not returning from 1961-62

- The Jack Paar Show
- The Best Of Paar
- The Tonight Show
