= Peter H. Odegard =

American political scientist and college administrator (1901–1966)

Peter H. Odegard (April 5, 1901 – December 6, 1966) was an American political scientist and college administrator. A specialist in the study of propaganda, he was special assistant to the Secretary of the Treasury at the start of the World War II War Bonds campaign. From 1945 to 1948 he was president of Reed College.

== Early life and education ==
Odegard was born in Kalispell, Montana; his parents were Norwegian immigrants. He earned his Bachelor's degree at the University of Washington and his Ph.D. from Columbia University.

== Career ==
Odegard taught at Columbia and then from 1929 to 1930 at Williams College, from 1930 to 1938 at Ohio State University, in 1934 at Stanford University, and beginning in 1939 at Amherst College. In 1938, with E. Allen Helms, he published American Politics, A Study in Political Dynamics, a book on the interactions between pressure groups, politicians, and the public that included several chapters on "the fine art of propaganda".

Based on this work, in 1941 he took a leave of absence from Amherst at the invitation of the Secretary of the Treasury, Henry Morgenthau Jr., to become his special assistant advising on the projected campaign for defense bonds. He was the main strategist for the program until 1942, when he left because he viewed high-pressure bond "drives" as ultimately damaging to public support for the government and the war effort. He chose the Minuteman as a "distinctly American" symbol of the program, suggested bonds be sold at banks and post offices, and set the initial tone of positive symbolism in order to persuade the public to contribute voluntarily. After the war he also worked for the Atomic Energy Commission, the President's Commission on Migratory Labor, and the National Commission for UNESCO.

From 1945 to 1948, Odegard was president of Reed College. He resigned to become Chair of the Political Science Department at the University of California, Berkeley. After seven years he stepped down as Chair; he retired in 1965 and died in a hospital in Oakland the following year after a heart attack.

Odegard gave a year-long series of television lectures on American Government: Structure and Function for the fourth season of NBC's Continental Classroom, which made him well known; his course was repeated for the fifth and final season. He served as president of the American Political Science Association in 1950–1951. He was also an associate editor of Our Times and of Public Opinion Quarterly.

The Peter H. Odegard Memorial Award in Political Science at the University of California, Berkeley was established in his honor upon his retirement. Collections of his papers are at the Franklin D. Roosevelt Presidential Library and Museum (primarily 1941–1945 and concerning his work with the Treasury Department) and at the University of California, Berkeley Libraries (1947–1966).

== Views ==
For the Defense Bonds, later War Bonds, program, Odegard insisted on the use of "plus symbols" and the avoidance of high-pressure, shaming tactics such as had been used in the World War I bond program. He warned that demonizing the enemy, or even using factual reports of atrocities, would cause the program to be labeled propaganda and rebound against it. He warned Morgenthau: "It would be easy to stampede the country into buying ... by frenetic appeals to fear or by frantic beating of the patriotic tom toms. But if you start a campaign that way you'll hear your appeals re-echo with a hollow sound before long."

He was a Democrat and in December 1957 announced that he would seek the party's nomination in the 1958 election to fill a seat in the Senate, but he also worked on bipartisan good government initiatives. He was opposed to the House Un-American Activities Committee; as a director of the Pacifica Foundation, which operated three non-profit FM radio stations in California and New York, he was subpoenaed in 1963 by the anti-Communist Senate Internal Security Subcommittee in connection with their broadcasts, and he was prominent in the protests by a group of Berkeley faculty against the anti-Communist loyalty oath. The economist F. Taylor Ostrander wrote of "[experiencing] political and even religious apostasy" because of Odegard's teaching at Williams College.

== Books ==
- Pressure Politics: The Story of the Anti-Saloon League. (PhD dissertation). New York: Columbia University, 1928, OCLC 317894519. Repr. New York: Octagon, 1966, OCLC 898890734.
- The American Public Mind. New York: Columbia University, 1930, OCLC 483948056.
- (with E. Allen Helms). American Politics: A Study in Political Dynamics. New York / London: Harper, 1938. Repr. New York: Arno, 1974, ISBN 978-0-405-05886-8. 2nd ed. with Hans H. Baerwald and William C. Havard, Harper, 1969, OCLC 5230.
- Prologue to November, 1940. New York: Harper, 1940. OCLC 43960946.
- (with Victor G Rosenblum). The Power to Govern: An Examination of the Separation of Powers in the American System of Government. Mount Vernon, New York(?), 1957. OCLC 1358734.
