= Our Five Daughters =

US television program

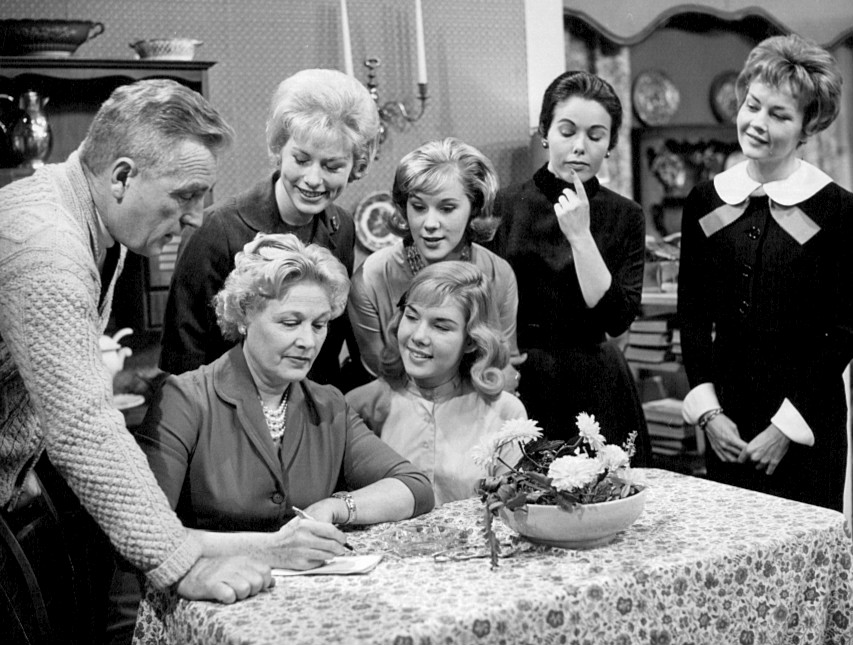
- Cast photo-first row from left: Michael Keene (Jim Lee-standing), Esther Ralston (Helen Lee-seated), Jacqueline Courtney (Ann Lee-seated). Top row: Patricia Allison (Barbara Lee), Iris Joyce (Marjorie Lee), Nuella Dierking (Jane Lee) and Wynne Miller (Mary Lee).
- Genre: Soap opera
- Country of origin: United States
- Original language: English

Production
- Running time: 30 minutes

Original release
- Network: NBC
- Release: January 2 – September 28, 1962

Our Five Daughters is a daytime soap opera that ran on NBC from January 2 to September 28, 1962. The show was written by Leonard Stadd and directed by Paul Lammers, and aired for a half-hour, five days a week, at 3:30 PM EST, right after Young Doctor Malone.

The show starred former silent film icon Esther Ralston, whose career had faded after refusing to sleep with a studio mogul; she had lost most of her money and had been working as a sales clerk before finding some acting roles here and there. One of them was a brief appearance on the daytime courtroom drama The Verdict Is Yours. Verdict producer Eugene Burr liked what he saw and offered her the lead role in his new soap, Our Five Daughters.

Ralston played Helen Lee, mother of five daughters, whose husband Jim (Michael Keene) was critically injured in an accident. He became an invalid and the abrupt change caused havoc for his wife and children. The show did not gain a significant audience and was ended after several months, on the same day The Brighter Day ended its run.

Jacqueline Courtney, who played daughter Ann Lee, was also a popular actress on other daytime shows such as The Edge of Night, Another World, and One Life to Live. Remarkably, all five actresses playing the daughters resembled Esther Ralston in her heyday.

Wynne Miller, who played her sister, was later featured on the NBC serial Somerset as Jessica Buchanan Delaney. Janis Young, who played another of the sisters, later played a mad housekeeper on Another World.

Other performers included Janis Young, future writer Ralph Ellis, Wynne Miller, and Edward Griffith.
