= Continental Classroom =

- Also known as: Education Exchange
- Genre: Educational television
- Created by: Edward Stanley
- Country of origin: United States

Production
- Running time: 30 minutes

Original release
- Network: NBC
- Release: October 6, 1958 – December 18, 1964

Continental Classroom is a U.S. educational television program that was broadcast on the NBC network five days a week in the early morning from 1958 to 1963, covering physics, chemistry, mathematics, and American government. It was targeted at teachers and college students and many institutions offered college credit for courses of which the broadcasts were the main component. The physics course was the first course in the subject available for credit nationwide and the government course was the first nationally broadcast TV course in social studies; the mathematics course has been called the first MOOC (massive open online course) in statistics.

== Background, production and format ==
The idea for the course came from the drive to upgrade science education, starting with the US Sputnik crisis of 1957. Learning of a plan by the New York State Commissioner of Education, James Allen, to spend $600,000 on a refresher course for science teachers, Edward Stanley, Director of Public Affairs and Education at NBC, decided the network could do the same nationwide for not much more money. The American Association of Colleges for Teacher Education was also planning a pilot project on using television in teacher training. Major funding for the program came from the Ford Foundation and from various corporations.

The title came from a phrase Stanley used to explain the idea to James Killian, science advisor to President Eisenhower. Physics for the nuclear age was the topic of the first year's course, which was broadcast from 6:30 to 7:00 in the morning Monday through Friday. The second course, in chemistry, was preceded by a rebroadcast of the physics course at 6:00 am. Courses in mathematics and American government followed. The Ford Foundation withdrew its funding for the fourth season, and the network subsequently canceled the program. The fifth season was a rebroadcast of the fourth, the last program airing on May 17, 1963.

Lecturers were paid $40,000 for a year of at least 130 half-hour lectures, and could have one or more paid assistants. They were given use of an apartment in Manhattan and their children were placed by NBC in good schools. They worked from outlines, rather than memorizing scripts. Each lecture was recorded in a four-hour studio session some two weeks ahead of the air date, usually in the afternoon by instructor preference. The first two seasons used three cameras; after the loss of the Ford Foundation support, this was reduced to two. The total budget was between $1.2 and $1.5 million a year.

The program attracted more viewers and a wider variety of viewers than NBC had expected: 400,000 for the physics course, 600,000 for chemistry, and one and a half million for American government, and including high-school classes (two of them for blind students), more than 800 engineers in the San Francisco Bay Area, nuns, 500 inmates of San Quentin State Prison in California, parents of students studying science, and other members of the public, including many 6–14-year-olds. As of 1960, one eighth of the viewers were teachers, four fifths of those science teachers. At its peak the program was shown on 172 stations, including some ABC and CBS affiliates and public television stations. Each course had an accompanying textbook, and about an hour of homework was assigned for each lecture; local colleges and universities were free to impose their own requirements such as discussion sessions, and to determine fees, for students to receive credit for the course. More than 400 institutions offered courses built around the program, for credit ranging from zero to seven hours; the maximum number of students watching the program for credit in any season was under 5,000. (The physics course was announced only about a month in advance of its start, causing logistical problems for colleges.) In some markets, such as New York, the program was ultimately re-run in the afternoon, and tapes were produced that some colleges used.

=== Season 1: Physics ===
The first course began on October 6, 1958, and consisted of 165 lectures under the title Atomic Age Physics by Harvey White, head of the physics department at the University of California, Berkeley. It was the first nationwide course offered for credit in physics. White, described by Time as looking "like an insomniac alchemist" on the program, had seven Nobel Prize winners appear as guest lecturers, one of them being Carl D. Anderson.

=== Season 2: Chemistry ===
For the second season, on chemistry, the lecturer was John F. Baxter of the University of Florida, and NBC broadcast the program in color. Nobel Prize winner Glenn Seaborg, then Chancellor at Berkeley, appeared on the first broadcast of the season. The physics course was repeated during the preceding half hour, and chemists and physicists began watching each other's programs in addition.

=== Season 3: Mathematics ===
The Contemporary Mathematics course that began in fall 1960 was divided in two ways: each week, the Monday, Wednesday, and Friday classes were for college students and the Tuesday and Thursday classes for teachers; and in addition, the first half of the course was Modern Algebra, taught by John Kelley of Berkeley and Julius H. Hlavaty of DeWitt Clinton High School, New York, respectively, and the second Probability and Statistics, taught by Frederick Mosteller, chairman of the department of statistics at Harvard University, and Paul Clifford of Montclair State College. The number of institutions offering credit for the course rose that year; probability was not commonly offered at the time. Exams were mailed out to participating institutions. According to Mosteller, more than 75,000 students took the probability and statistics course for credit at 320 colleges. Some high schools also gave credit for it. Gottfried Noether, then at Boston University, helped develop the course and administer it at the institutional level.

=== Seasons 4 and 5: Government ===
The course in government was titled American Government: Structure and Function and taught by Peter H. Odegard, chairman of the political science department at Berkeley. It was the first college-credit course in social studies to be available on national television; the audience included over half the high-school social science teachers in the US.

For the fifth season, in 1962–63, there were plans for a course in economics, but NBC decided the cost of the program was too high, and instead the government course was repeated.

=== Education Exchange ===
In the 1963–64 season Continental Classroom became Education Exchange, which aired for the last time on December 18, 1964. This took the form of short courses on specific topics developed by outside agencies, such as a 20-day series on safety, and series titled Wall Street for Everyone and Sex in American Culture.

== Reception ==
In its first season the program won the 1958 Peabody Award for Television Education and the 1958 Sylvania Television Award for Outstanding Public Service Series.

Stanley of NBC said that Alexander Stoddard, the former superintendent of schools in Los Angeles, had told him Continental Classroom was "the most significant thing that happened in American education in the last 100 years" and that the League of Women Voters had been convinced NBC had produced the government course "just for them". Teachers taking the courses for in-service credit reported that they were useful for keeping up to date, even for recent graduates. In 1992, David S. Moore looked back on it as "quite remarkable", a precursor of programs for highly motivated learners like the National Technological University. The statistics and probability course has been called the first MOOC in statistics.

== See also ==
- Sunrise Semester
