= From These Roots =

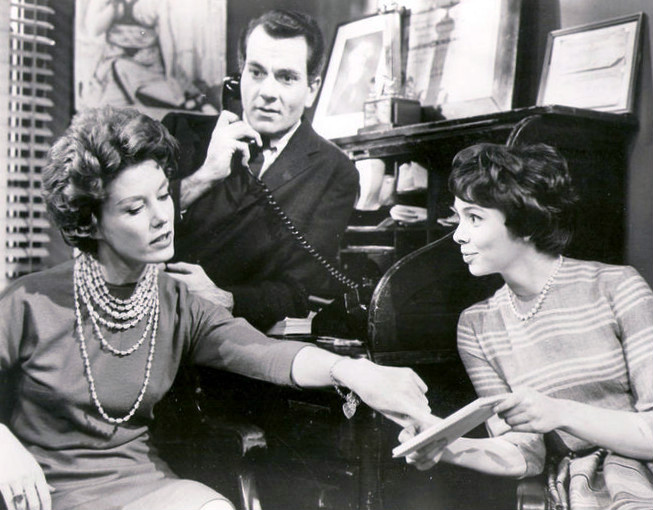
- Scene from the show. From left: Ann Flood, Robert Mandan, and Sarah Hardy, 1961
- Genre: Soap opera
- Created by: John Pickard; Frank Provo
- Starring: Millette Alexander; Barbara Berjer; Julie Bovasso; Susan Brown
- Country of origin: United States
- Original language: English
- No. of seasons: 3
- No. of episodes: 913

Production
- Running time: 30 minutes

Original release
- Network: NBC
- Release: June 30, 1958 – December 29, 1961

From These Roots is an American soap opera that aired from June 30, 1958, to December 29, 1961. It was created and written by Frank Provo and John Pickard. The show was seen on NBC.

== Storyline ==
Actress Ann Flood starred as Elizabeth "Liz" Fraser Allen, a successful writer who had returned to her New England hometown of Strathfield to run her family's newspaper, the Strathfield Record. Her father, Ben Fraser, Sr. had suffered a heart attack, thus causing Liz, who had been living and working in Washington, D.C. to come home, leaving her D.C. fiance, Bruce Crawford. Another former beau, from her earlier days in Strathfield, Dr. Buck Weaver, eventually married his secretary, Maggie Barker.

Her family included a brother Ben, Jr. who worked a family farm, was married to Italian Rose Corelli; had three children, including a son, named Dan, and didn't have much to do with the newspaper; and a sister Emily, who was married to Jim Benson and, after Jim's death, to Frank Teton. Jim and Emily had a daughter, named Lyddy, who worked with her aunt Liz on the newspaper.

Liz's first adversary was wealthy Enid Chambers, who was the first wife of the man she would eventually marry, David Allen. Her later adversary was alcoholic actress, Lynn Franklin, who, despite her own marriage to Tom Jennings, was very much in love with David and wanted him for herself.

== Famous actors ==
Several actors featured on From These Roots found fame in later shows. These include: Henderson Forsythe (Jim Benson), who went on to fame as Dr. David Stewart on As the World Turns; Charlotte Rae (Hilda Furman), who played Edna Garrett on Diff'rent Strokes and The Facts of Life; Billie Lou Watt (Maggie Barker Weaver) who played Ellie Harper on Search for Tomorrow and the voice of Ma Bagge (Eustace's mother) on the series Courage the Cowardly Dog; Audra Lindley (Laura Tompkins), best known as Helen Roper from Three's Company and its spin-off The Ropers; Millette Alexander (Gloria Saxon), who appeared on As the World Turns, Guiding Light and The Edge of Night; Robert Mandan (David Allen) who later played Chester Tate on Soap, Colonel Fielding on the television adaptation of the movie Private Benjamin, and Sam Reynolds on Search for Tomorrow; Barbara Berjer (Lynn Franklin) who continued serial work, most notably on As the World Turns and Guiding Light; Richard Thomas (Richard), known as John-Boy Walton #1 from The Waltons; Joseph Mascolo (Jack Lander), known for his roles as Stefano DiMera on Days of Our Lives and Massimo Marone on The Bold and the Beautiful; John Karlen, later known as Willie Loomis #2 on Dark Shadows and Harvey Lacey of Cagney & Lacey; and John Colenback (Jimmy Hull) who played Dr. Dan Stewart on As the World Turns.

The show was directed by Joseph Behar, and Don Wallace and Paul Lammers, who were producers as well, along with Eugene Barr. It was known for a story that dealt with the show-within-a-show performance of Madame Bovary, which featured the show's villainess Lynn Franklin.

A dispute between Wallace and Lammers with actress Julie Bovasso resulted in the latter's being fired from the show. Bovasso, who played Rose Corelli, Ben Fraser, Jr.'s wife, had a disagreement with a specific line's meaning, and she walked off the set. A line producer stepped in for her and did her roles that day. Bovasso was fired, and actress Tresa Hughes took over as Rose until the show's end in 1961.

== Cancellation ==
The show was cancelled in 1961 because not many people felt at home with this kind of drama, which was unusual for serials of that time. This soap opera was more literary than most that were on the air at that time. The owner of the show, Procter and Gamble, sold the show to network NBC, which cancelled the program.

As such, all the stories were wrapped up and ended happily. Ben, Sr. who had become Strathfield's mayor, had cleaned up the town of organized crime; Kass, the Fraser's lovable maid, had received a great big settlement from her late husband's estate; Lyddy had announced she was engaged; and Liz and her husband, David had achieved mutual success as writers.
