= Number Please (game show) =

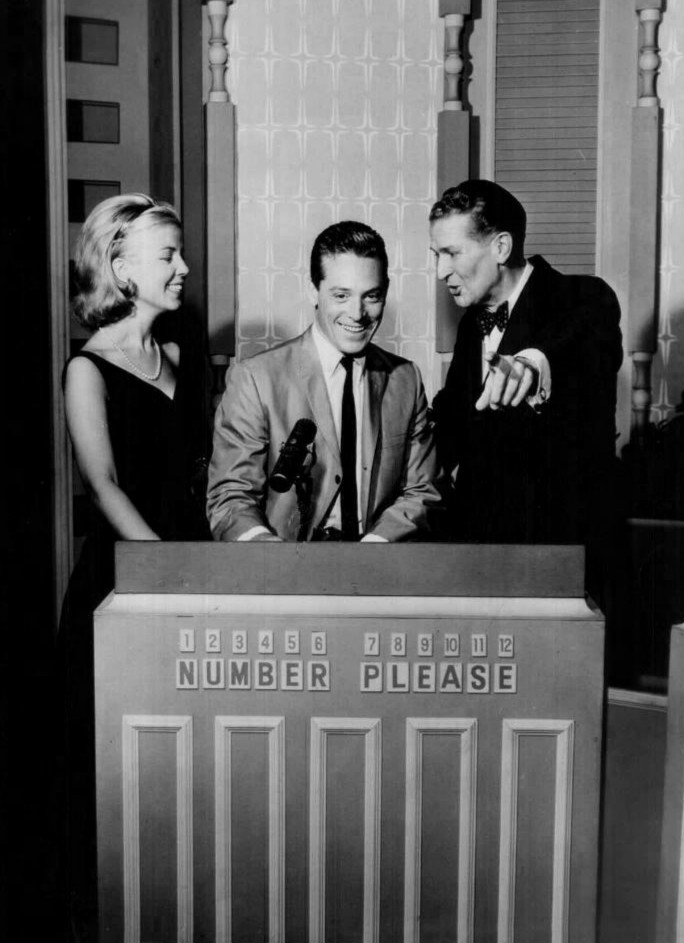
- Reggie Dombeck and host Bud Collyer with actor Paul Burke, a star of ABC's Naked City, as a contestant
- Created by: Mark Goodson; Bill Todman
- Presented by: Bud Collyer
- Announcer: Ralph Paul
- Country of origin: United States

Production
- Running time: 30 Minutes

Original release
- Network: ABC
- Release: January 30 – December 29, 1961

Number Please is a Goodson-Todman Productions game show hosted by Bud Collyer which aired at 12:30 p.m. weekdays on ABC from January 30 to December 29, 1961. It replaced Collyer's Beat the Clock when that series ended its run on ABC. Number Please was an early predecessor of Wheel of Fortune and other word-puzzle programs.

== Development ==
The show was initially conceived for CBS in 1958 and was to be sponsored by Brown & Williamson, and it was supposed to premiere on September 30, 1958, but it was cancelled before airing an episode as a result of the 1950s quiz show scandals.

The show eventually picked up by ABC in late 1960, and eventually aired in 1961.

== Game play ==
Two contestants competed against each other to solve a puzzle on a game board. Each contestant had his/her own row on the board, with the spaces on each row numbered 1–20. Contestants alternated choosing a number not yet revealed in their own puzzle, with each number revealing either a letter or a space.

Each puzzle described a prize, and the first contestant who thought that he could solve both rows rang in and gave an answer for both rows exactly as the configuration appeared on the board. If the contestant was correct, he won both prizes and, occasionally, other related items.

When the series began, the winner played against a new opponent and after five wins a contestant was retired as an undefeated champion. By May, this was amended to best-of-three with the appearance limit dropped.

== Episode status ==
Only one episode is known to exist, dating from sometime in May 1961, and exists on 2" videotape, which is unusual for many near-lost shows of the time. The episode was rerun on GSN on the morning of October 9, 2006 and on Buzzr on September 27, 2020 as a part of its 5th annual Lost & Found marathon.
