= Calendar (American TV program) =

American TV program

Calendar is a weekday news and information daytime program aimed at women that aired in the United States on CBS Television from 1961 to 1963. The program was co-hosted by Harry Reasoner and Mary Fickett. Madeline Amgott, who became one of the first women to produce television news during the 1950s and 1960s, helped create the show.

CBS scheduled the half-hour program in the 10 a.m. timeslot on the East Coast. Since the network then believed women were the primary audience for daytime television, it created a substantive information program geared toward a female audience. Each show began with Reasoner giving a summary of the latest news and then introducing the topic for the day, which was presented by Fickett.

A review in TV Guide commended Reasoner for not oversimplifying the news and noted that Fickett contributed "as another intelligent questioner and commentator" rather than someone who just represented "the woman's side."

Calendar's topics were diverse, ranging from national politics to interior decorating.

The mood of the program was relaxed despite its serious ambition. During an interview with a designer of modern furniture, Reasoner asked, "What would you say if I said you were giving us 'fake simplicity'?" The designer responded, "I'd say you're being offensive."

And on a day when the topic was redrawing voting districts to equalize representation between urban and rural regions, Fickett introduced the segment by acknowledging it was a subject that "sounds weighty for this time of the morning" before assuring viewers that she herself had found it interesting.
