= The Verdict Is Yours =

- Genre: Dramatized court show
- Written by: Peter Wildeblood
- Presented by: Jim McKay (1958–60); Bill Stout (1960–62)
- Starring: David Ensor; Robert Rietty
- Narrated by: Jim McKay (1958–60); Bill Stout (1960–62)
- Country of origin: United States
- Original language: English
- No. of seasons: 5

Production
- Running time: 30 minutes

Original release
- Network: CBS
- Release: September 2, 1957 – September 28, 1962

The Verdict Is Yours an American dramatized court show that aired on CBS Daytime from September 2, 1957, to September 28, 1962, and in primetime from July 3 to September 25, 1958.

== Overview ==
The Verdict Is Yours premiered on September 2, 1957, in the CBS Daytime lineup. The show was unscripted and featured real lawyers portraying both the attorneys and the judge. The defendants and witnesses on the program were professional actors who ad-libbed their dialogue, although they were given a general outline of what they were supposed to say. Sportscaster Jim McKay was the original reporter, providing commentary on the trials. He was succeeded in 1960 by newsman Bill Stout. The program aired weekly on CBS’ nighttime schedule in July 1958. The studio audience served as the jury.

All the cases took place in Overlook, a fictional town.

== Cast ==
- David Ensor served as the judge on most episodes.
- Robert Rietty served as an attorney on most episodes.
- Madeline Large served as an attorney on most episodes.

== Reception ==
According to Christopher Schemering in The Soap Opera Encyclopedia, "Legal groups across the country applauded the program's realism. TV Guide found it 'contrived' but 'fascinating.'"
