= 1964–65 United States network television schedule (daytime) =

The following is the 1964–65 daytime network television schedule for the three major English-language commercial broadcast networks in the United States. It covers the weekday daytime hours from September 1964 to August 1965.

Talk shows are highlighted in yellow, local programming is white, reruns of prime-time programming are orange, game shows are pink, soap operas are chartreuse, news programs are gold and all others are light blue. New series are highlighted in bold.

== Monday-Friday ==
Network		7:00 am	7:30 am	8:00 am	8:30 am	9:00 am	9:30 am	10:00 am	10:30 am	11:00 am	11:30 am	noon	12:30 pm	1:00 pm	1:30 pm	2:00 pm	2:30 pm	3:00 pm	3:30 pm	4:00 pm	4:30 pm	5:00 pm	5:30 pm	6:00 pm	6:30 pm
ABC	Fall	local							The Price Is Right	Get the Message	Missing Links	Father Knows Best (R)	Hello, Peapickers starring Tennessee Ernie Ford	Local			2:30 pm: Day in Court 2:55 pm: News with the Woman's Touch	General Hospital	**The Young Marrieds**	Trailmaster (R)		local		The ABC Evening News with Ron Cochran 6:15: local	local
ABC	Winter	local									The Price Is Right	**The Donna Reed Show** (R)	Father Knows Best (R)	Hello, Peapickers starring Tennessee Ernie Ford	local	**A Flame in the Wind**	2:30 pm: Day in Court 2:55 pm: News with the Woman's Touch	General Hospital	**The Young Marrieds**	Trailmaster (R)		local		Peter Jennings with the News 6:15: local	local
ABC	Spring	local									The Price Is Right	**The Donna Reed Show** (R)	Father Knows Best (R)	**The Rebus Game**	local	**A Flame in the Wind**	2:30 pm: Day in Court 2:55 pm: News with the Woman's Touch	General Hospital	**The Young Marrieds**	Trailmaster (R)		local		Peter Jennings with the News 6:15: local	local
ABC	Summer	local									The Price Is Right	**The Donna Reed Show** (R)	Father Knows Best (R)	**The Rebus Game**	local	**Where the Action Is**	2:30 pm: A Time for Us 2:55 pm: News with the Women's Touch	General Hospital	**The Young Marrieds**	Trailmaster (R)		local		Peter Jennings with the News 6:15: local	local
CBS		Local		Captain Kangaroo		local		CBS Morning News with Mike Wallace	I Love Lucy (R)	The Real McCoys (R)	**Andy of Mayberry** (R)	12 Noon: Love of Life 12:25 pm: CBS News	12:30 pm: Search for Tomorrow 12:45 pm: The Guiding Light	Local	As the World Turns	Password	Art Linkletter's House Party	3:00 pm: To Tell the Truth 3:25 pm: CBS News	The Edge of Night	The Secret Storm	**The Jack Benny Daytime Show** (R)	local			CBS Evening News
NBC	Fall	Today				local		The Danny Thomas Show (R)	10:30 am: **What's This Song?** In COLOR 10:55 am: NBC News	Concentration	Jeopardy! In COLOR	Say When!! In COLOR	12:30 pm: Truth or Consequences In COLOR 12:55 pm: NBC News	local	1:30 pm: Let's Make a Deal In COLOR 1:55 pm: NBC News	The Loretta Young Theater (R)	The Doctors	Another World	You Don't Say! In COLOR	4:00 pm: The Match Game (In COLOR starting 4/5) 4:25 pm NBC News	local				The Huntley-Brinkley Report
NBC	Winter	Today				local		Make Room for Daddy (R)	10:30 am: **What's This Song?** In COLOR 10:55 am: NBC News	Concentration	Jeopardy! In COLOR	Say When!! In COLOR	12:30 pm: Truth or Consequences In COLOR 12:55 pm: NBC News	local	1:30 pm: Let's Make a Deal In COLOR 1:55 pm: NBC News	**Moment of Truth**	The Doctors	Another World	You Don't Say! In COLOR	4:00 pm: The Match Game (In COLOR starting 4/5) 4:25 pm NBC News	local				The Huntley-Brinkley Report
NBC	Spring	Today				local		10:00 am: Truth or Consequences In COLOR 10:25 am: NBC News	What's This Song? In COLOR	Concentration	Jeopardy! In COLOR	**Call My Bluff** In COLOR	12:30 pm: **I'll Bet** In COLOR 12:55 pm: NBC News	local	1:30 pm: Let's Make a Deal In COLOR 1:55 pm: NBC News	**Moment of Truth**	The Doctors	Another World	You Don't Say! In COLOR	4:00 pm: The Match Game (In COLOR starting 4/5) 4:25 pm NBC News	local				The Huntley-Brinkley Report

== Saturday ==
Network		6:00 am	6:30 am	7:00 am	7:30 am	8:00 am	8:30 am	9:00 am	9:30 am	10:00 am	10:30 am	11:00 am	11:30 am	noon	12:30 pm	1:00 pm	1:30 pm	2:00 pm	2:30 pm	3:00 pm	3:30 pm	4:00 pm	4:30 pm	5:00 pm	5:30 pm	6:00 pm	6:30 pm
ABC	Fall	local							**Buffalo Bill, Jr.** (R)	**Shenanigans**	**Annie Oakley** (R)	The New Casper Cartoon Show (R)	Beany and Cecil (R)	The Bugs Bunny Show (R)	**Hoppity Hooper** In COLOR	The Magic Land of Allakazam	The New American Bandstand 1965		ABC Sports and/or local								
ABC	Winter	local								**Shenanigans**	**Annie Oakley** (R)	The New Casper Cartoon Show (R)	The Porky Pig Show	The Bugs Bunny Show (R)	**Hoppity Hooper** In COLOR	The New American Bandstand 1965		ABC Sports and/or local									
ABC	Spring	local										The New Casper Cartoon Show (R)	The Porky Pig Show	The Bugs Bunny Show (R)	**Hoppity Hooper** In COLOR	The New American Bandstand 1965		ABC Sports and/or local									
CBS		local programming	Sunrise Semester	local programming		**Mister Mayor**		The Alvin Show (R)	Tennessee Tuxedo and His Tales	The Quick Draw McGraw Show (R)	Mighty Mouse Playhouse	**Linus the Lionhearted**	The Jetsons (R)	Sky King (R)	My Friend Flicka (R)	I Love Lucy (R)	The CBS Saturday News	CBS Sports and/or local									
NBC	Fall	local							The Hector Heathcote Show	**The Underdog Show** In COLOR	Fireball XL5	Dennis the Menace (R)	Fury (R)	Exploring		NBC Sports In COLOR and/or local											
NBC	Spring	local						Top Cat (R)	The Hector Heathcote Show	**The Underdog Show** In COLOR	Fireball XL5	Dennis the Menace (R)	Fury (R)	Exploring		NBC Sports In COLOR and/or local											
NBC	Summer	local						Top Cat (R)	The Hector Heathcote Show	**The Underdog Show** In COLOR	Fireball XL5	Dennis the Menace (R)	Fury (R)	NBC Sports In COLOR and/or local													

== Sunday ==
Network		7:00 am	7:30 am	8:00 am	8:30 am	9:00 am	9:30 am	10:00 am	10:30 am	11:00 am	11:30 am	noon	12:30 pm	1:00 pm	1:30 pm	2:00 pm	2:30 pm	3:00 pm	3:30 pm	4:00 pm	4:30 pm	5:00 pm	5:30 pm	6:00 pm	6:30 pm
ABC	Fall	local programming							**The Porky Pig Show**	**The Bullwinkle Show** (R)	Discovery	local programming		Directions '65	Issues and Answers	AFL on ABC and/or local									
ABC	Winter	local programming							Beany and Cecil (R)	**The Bullwinkle Show** (R)	Discovery	local programming		Directions '65	Issues and Answers	ABC Sports and/or local									
ABC	Summer	local programming								Beany and Cecil (R)	The Bullwinkle Show (R)	Discovery	local programming		Issues and Answers	ABC Sports and/or local									
CBS	Fall	local programming						Lamp Unto My Feet	Look Up and Live	Camera Three	local programming		Face the Nation	NFL on CBS and/or local programming									Ted Mack's Amateur Hour	The Twentieth Century	Mister Ed
CBS	Winter	local programming						Lamp Unto My Feet	Look Up and Live	Camera Three	local programming		Face the Nation	CBS Sports and/or local programming			CBS Sports Spectacular	CBS Sports and/or local programming					Ted Mack's Amateur Hour	The Twentieth Century	World War One
CBS	Spring	local programming						Lamp Unto My Feet	Look Up and Live	Camera Three	local programming		Face the Nation	CBS Sports and/or local programming								Zoorama	Ted Mack's Amateur Hour	The Twentieth Century	World War One
NBC	Fall	local programming											Watch Mr. Wizard	Youth Forum	Frontiers of Faith / Eternal Light / Catholic Hour	Specials	Recital Hall	Open Mind / Kaleidoscope		Sunday		Wild Kingdom	College Bowl	Meet the Press	1964 Summer Olympics / Specials
NBC	November	local programming											Watch Mr. Wizard	Youth Forum	Frontiers of Faith / Eternal Light / Catholic Hour	Specials	Recital Hall	Open Mind / Kaleidoscope		Sunday		Wild Kingdom	College Bowl	Meet the Press	**Profiles in Courage**
NBC	Winter	local programming										Youth Forum	Watch Mr. Wizard	Recital Hall	Frontiers of Faith / Eternal Light / Catholic Hour	Open Mind / Kaleidoscope		Sunday		**Sports in Action**		Wild Kingdom	College Bowl	Meet the Press	**Profiles in Courage**
NBC	Summer	local programming										Youth Forum	Report Card for Parents	Recital Hall	Frontiers of Faith / Eternal Light / Catholic Hour	Open Mind / Kaleidoscope		Sunday		NBC Sports and/or local programming			21st Century: Threshold	Meet the Press	Sports in Action

== By network ==
=== ABC ===
Returning series:

- The ABC Evening News with Ron Cochran
- The Bugs Bunny Show (repeats)
- Beany and Cecil (repeats)
- The New Casper Cartoon Show
- Day in Court
- Discovery
- Father Knows Best (repeats)
- General Hospital
- Get the Message
- Hello, Peapickers starring Tennessee Ernie Ford
- Issues and Answers
- The Magic Land of Allakazam
- Missing Links
- News with the Women's Touch
- The New Casper Cartoon Show (repeats)
- The New American Bandstand 1965
- Trailmaster (repeats)

New series:

- **A Flame in the Wind/A Time for Us**
- **Annie Oakley** (repeats)
- **Buffalo Bill, Jr.** (repeats)
- **The Bullwinkle Show** (repeats) (moved from NBC)
- **The Donna Reed Show** (repeats)
- **Hoppity Hooper**
- **Peter Jennings with the News**
- **The Porky Pig Show**
- **The Rebus Game**
- **Shenanigans**
- **The Young Marrieds**

Not returning from 1963-64:

- The Jetsons (repeats) (moved to CBS)
- My Friend Flicka (repeats) (moved back to CBS)
- The Object Is
- Queen for a Day
- Seven Keys
- Who Do You Trust?

=== CBS ===
**Returning Series**

- The Alvin Show (reruns)
- Art Linkletter's House Party
- As the World Turns
- Camera Three
- Captain Kangaroo
- CBS Morning News with Mike Wallace
- CBS Evening News
- The CBS Saturday News
- The Edge of Night
- Face the Nation
- The Guiding Light
- The Jetsons (repeats)
- Lamp Unto My Feet
- Look Up and Live
- Love of Life
- I Love Lucy (repeats)
- The McCoys (repeats)
- Mighty Mouse Playhouse
- Mister Ed
- My Friend Flicka (repeats)
- NFL on CBS
- Password
- The Quick Draw McGraw Show (repeats)
- Search for Tomorrow
- The Secret Storm
- Sky King (repeats)
- Sunrise Semester
- Ted Mack's Amateur Hour
- Tennessee Tuxedo and His Tales
- To Tell the Truth
- The Twentieth Century
- World War One
- Zoorama

**New Series**

- **Andy of Mayberry** (repeats)
- **The Jack Benny Daytime Show**
- **Mister Mayor**
- **Linus the Lionhearted**

**Not Returning From 1963-64**

- The Adventures of Rin-Tin-Tin (repeats)
- Do You Know?
- Pete and Gladys (repeats)
- The Roy Rogers Show (repeats)

=== NBC ===
**Returning Series**

- Another World
- Catholic Hour
- College Bowl
- Concentration
- Dennis the Menace (repeats)
- The Doctors
- Eternal Light
- Exploring
- Fireball XL5
- Frontiers of Faith
- Fury (repeats)
- The Hector Heathcote Show
- Jeopardy!
- Kaleidoscope
- Let's Make a Deal
- The Loretta Young Theater
- Make Room for Daddy (repeats)
- The Match Game
- Meet the Press
- Open Mind
- Say When!!
- Recital Hall
- Top Cat (repeats)
- Today
- Truth or Consequences
- Watch Mr. Wizard
- Wild Kingdom
- You Don't Say!
- Youth Forum

**New Series**

- **Call My Bluff**
- **I'll Bet**
- **Moment of Truth**
- **Profiles in Courage**
- **Sports in Action**
- **The Underdog Show**
- **What's This Song?**

**Not Returning From 1963-64**

- The Bullwinkle Show (repeats) (moved to ABC)
- Merv Griffin's Word for Word
- Sergeant Preston of the Yukon (repeats)

== See also ==
- 1964-65 United States network television schedule (prime-time)
- 1964-65 United States network television schedule (late night)

== Sources ==
- Castleman & Podrazik, The TV Schedule Book, McGraw-Hill Paperbacks, 1984
- TV schedule pages, The New York Times, September 1964-September 1965 (microfilm)
