= 1965–66 United States network television schedule (daytime) =

The following is the 1965–66 daytime network television schedule for the three major English-language commercial broadcast networks in the United States. It covers the weekday daytime hours from September 1965 to August 1966.

Talk shows are highlighted in yellow, local programming is white, reruns of prime-time programming are orange, game shows are pink, soap operas are chartreuse, news programs are gold and all others are light blue. New series are highlighted in bold.

== Monday-Friday ==
Network		7:00 am	7:30 am	8:00 am	8:30 am	9:00 am	9:30 am	10:00 am	10:30 am	11:00 am	11:30 am	noon	12:30 pm	1:00 pm	1:30 pm	2:00 pm	2:30 pm	3:00 pm	3:30 pm	4:00 pm	4:30 pm	5:00 pm	5:30 pm	6:00 pm	6:30 pm
ABC	Fall	Local								**The Young Set**		The Donna Reed Show (R)	Father Knows Best (R)	**Ben Casey** (R)		**The Nurses**	A Time for Us 2:55 pm: News with the Woman's Touch	General Hospital	The Young Marrieds	**Never Too Young** 4:25 pm: **Arlene Dahl's Beauty Spot** In COLOR (effective 3/28)	Where the Action Is	Local		Peter Jennings with the News 6:15: Local	Local
ABC	December	Local								**Supermarket Sweep**	**The Dating Game**	The Donna Reed Show (R)	Father Knows Best (R)	**Ben Casey** (R)		**The Nurses**	A Time for Us 2:55 pm: News with the Woman's Touch	General Hospital	The Young Marrieds	**Never Too Young** 4:25 pm: **Arlene Dahl's Beauty Spot** In COLOR (effective 3/28)	Where the Action Is	Local		Peter Jennings with the News 6:15: Local	Local
ABC	Spring	Local								**Supermarket Sweep**	**The Dating Game**	The Donna Reed Show (R)	Father Knows Best (R)	**Ben Casey** (R)		**Confidential for Women**	A Time for Us 2:55 pm: News with the Woman's Touch	General Hospital	The Nurses	**Never Too Young** 4:25 pm: **Arlene Dahl's Beauty Spot** In COLOR (effective 3/28)	Where the Action Is	Local		Peter Jennings with the News 6:15: Local	Local
ABC	Summer	Local								**Supermarket Sweep**	**The Dating Game**	The Donna Reed Show (R)	Father Knows Best (R)	**Ben Casey** (R)		**The Newlywed Game**	A Time for Us 2:55 pm: News with the Woman's Touch	General Hospital	The Nurses	**Dark Shadows**	Where the Action Is	Local		Peter Jennings with the News 6:15: Local	Local
CBS		7:05: CBS Morning News (In COLOR starting 8/29)	Local	Captain Kangaroo		Local		I Love Lucy (R)	The Real McCoys (R)	Andy Of Mayberry (R)	**The Dick Van Dyke Morning Show** (R)	Love of Life 12:25: CBS News	12:30: Search for Tomorrow 12:45: The Guiding Light	Local	As the World Turns	Password	Art Linkletter's House Party (In COLOR starting 9/13)	To Tell the Truth 3:25: CBS News	The Edge of Night	The Secret Storm	Local				CBS Evening News (In COLOR starting 1/31)
NBC	Fall	Today (In COLOR starting 9/13)				Local		**Fractured Phrases** (In COLOR starting 9/27) 10:25: NBC News	Concentration	**Morning Star** (In COLOR starting 9/27)	**Paradise Bay** (In COLOR starting 9/27)	Jeopardy! In COLOR	**Let's Play Post Office** In COLOR 12:55 pm: NBC News	Local	Let's Make a Deal In COLOR 1:55 pm: NBC News	Moment of Truth	The Doctors	Another World (In COLOR starting 6/20)	You Don't Say! In COLOR	The Match Game In COLOR 4:25: NBC News	Local				The Huntley–Brinkley Report (In COLOR starting 11/15)
NBC	November	Today (In COLOR starting 9/13)				Local		**Fractured Phrases** (In COLOR starting 9/27) 10:25: NBC News	Concentration	**Morning Star** (In COLOR starting 9/27)	**Paradise Bay** (In COLOR starting 9/27)	Jeopardy! In COLOR	**Let's Play Post Office** In COLOR 12:55 pm: NBC News	Local	Let's Make a Deal In COLOR 1:55 pm: NBC News	**Days of Our Lives** In COLOR	The Doctors	Another World (In COLOR starting 6/20)	You Don't Say! In COLOR	The Match Game In COLOR 4:25: NBC News	Local				The Huntley–Brinkley Report (In COLOR starting 11/15)
NBC	Winter	Today (In COLOR starting 9/13)				Local		**Eye Guess** In COLOR 10:25: NBC News	Concentration	**Morning Star** (In COLOR starting 9/27)	**Paradise Bay** (In COLOR starting 9/27)	Jeopardy! In COLOR	**Let's Play Post Office** In COLOR 12:55 pm: NBC News	Local	Let's Make a Deal In COLOR 1:55 pm: NBC News	**Days of Our Lives** In COLOR	The Doctors	Another World (In COLOR starting 6/20)	You Don't Say! In COLOR	The Match Game In COLOR 4:25: NBC News	Local				The Huntley–Brinkley Report (In COLOR starting 11/15)
NBC	Summer	Today (In COLOR starting 9/13)				Local		**Eye Guess** In COLOR 10:25: NBC News	Concentration	**Morning Star** (In COLOR starting 9/27)	**Paradise Bay** (In COLOR starting 9/27)	Jeopardy! In COLOR	**Swinging Country** In COLOR 12:55 pm: NBC News	Local	Let's Make a Deal In COLOR 1:55 pm: NBC News	**Days of Our Lives** In COLOR	The Doctors	Another World (In COLOR starting 6/20)	You Don't Say! In COLOR	The Match Game In COLOR 4:25: NBC News	Local				The Huntley–Brinkley Report (In COLOR starting 11/15)
NBC	July	Today (In COLOR starting 9/13)				Local		**Eye Guess** In COLOR 10:25: NBC News	Concentration	**Chain Letter** In COLOR	**Showdown** In COLOR	Jeopardy! In COLOR	**Swinging Country** In COLOR 12:55 pm: NBC News	Local	Let's Make a Deal In COLOR 1:55 pm: NBC News	**Days of Our Lives** In COLOR	The Doctors	Another World (In COLOR starting 6/20)	You Don't Say! In COLOR	The Match Game In COLOR 4:25: NBC News	Local				The Huntley–Brinkley Report (In COLOR starting 11/15)

== Saturday ==
Network		6:00 am	6:30 am	7:00 am	7:30 am	8:00 am	8:30 am	9:00 am	9:30 am	10:00 am	10:30 am	11:00 am	11:30 am	noon	12:30 pm	1:00 pm	1:30 pm	2:00 pm	2:30 pm	3:00 pm	3:30 pm	4:00 pm	4:30 pm	5:00 pm	5:30 pm	6:00 pm	6:30 pm
ABC	Fall	Local								Shenanigans	**The Beatles** In COLOR	The New Casper Cartoon Show (R) In COLOR	The Porky Pig Show In COLOR	The Bugs Bunny Show (R)	**The Milton the Monster Show** In COLOR	Hoppity Hooper In COLOR	The New American Bandstand 1966		ABC Sports In COLOR and/or local								
ABC	Winter	Local								The Porky Pig Show In COLOR	**The Beatles** In COLOR	The New Casper Cartoon Show (R) In COLOR	**The Magilla Gorilla Show** (R)	The Bugs Bunny Show (R)	**The Milton the Monster Show** In COLOR	Hoppity Hooper In COLOR	The New American Bandstand 1966		ABC Sports In COLOR and/or local								
CBS	Fall	local programming	Sunrise Semester	local programming		Captain Kangaroo		The Heckle and Jeckle Cartoon Show In COLOR	Tennessee Tuxedo and His Tales In COLOR	Mighty Mouse Playhouse In COLOR	Linus the Lionhearted In COLOR	**Tom and Jerry** In COLOR	The Quick Draw McGraw Show (R) In COLOR	Sky King (R)	Lassie (R)	My Friend Flicka (R)	The CBS Saturday News In COLOR	CBS Sports In COLOR and/or local									
CBS	February	local programming	Sunrise Semester	local programming		Captain Kangaroo		The Heckle and Jeckle Cartoon Show In COLOR	Tennessee Tuxedo and His Tales In COLOR	Mighty Mouse Playhouse In COLOR	Lassie (R)	**Tom and Jerry** In COLOR	The Quick Draw McGraw Show (R) In COLOR	Sky King (R)	Linus the Lionhearted In COLOR	My Friend Flicka (R)	CBS Sports In COLOR and/or local										CBS Evening News In COLOR
CBS	June	local programming	Summer Semester	local programming		Captain Kangaroo		The Heckle and Jeckle Cartoon Show In COLOR	Tennessee Tuxedo and His Tales In COLOR	Mighty Mouse Playhouse In COLOR	Lassie (R)	**Tom and Jerry** In COLOR	The Quick Draw McGraw Show (R) In COLOR	Sky King (R)	Linus the Lionhearted In COLOR	My Friend Flicka (R)	CBS Sports In COLOR and/or local										CBS Evening News In COLOR
NBC	Fall	Local						The Jetsons (R)	**The Atom Ant Show** In COLOR	**The Secret Squirrel Show** In COLOR	Underdog In COLOR	Top Cat (R)	Fury (R)	**The First Look**	Exploring	NBC Sports In COLOR and/or local											
NBC	Winter	Local						The Jetsons (R)	The Atom Ant/Secret Squirrel Show In COLOR		Underdog In COLOR	Top Cat (R)	Fury (R)	**The First Look**	Exploring	NBC Sports In COLOR and/or local											
NBC	Spring	Local						The Jetsons (R)	The Atom Ant/Secret Squirrel Show In COLOR		Underdog In COLOR	Top Cat (R)	Fury (R)	NBC Sports In COLOR and/or local													

== Sunday ==
Network		7:00 am	7:30 am	8:00 am	8:30 am	9:00 am	9:30 am	10:00 am	10:30 am	11:00 am	11:30 am	noon	12:30 pm	1:00 pm	1:30 pm	2:00 pm	2:30 pm	3:00 pm	3:30 pm	4:00 pm	4:30 pm	5:00 pm	5:30 pm	6:00 pm	6:30 pm
ABC	Fall	local programming						Annie Oakley (R)	Beany and Cecil (R)	The Bullwinkle Show (R)	Discovery	local programming		Directions '66	Issues and Answers	ABC Sports In COLOR and/or local									
ABC	Winter	local programming						Beany and Cecil (R)	**The Peter Potamus Show**	The Bullwinkle Show (R)	Discovery	local programming		Directions '66	Issues and Answers	ABC Sports In COLOR and/or local									
ABC	Summer	local programming						Beany and Cecil (R)	**The Peter Potamus Show**	The Bullwinkle Show (R)	Discovery	local programming			Issues and Answers	ABC Sports In COLOR and/or local									
CBS	Fall	local programming						Lamp Unto My Feet	Look Up and Live	Camera Three	local programming		Face the Nation In COLOR	NFL on CBS In COLOR and/or local programming								Mister Ed	Ted Mack's Amateur Hour	The Twentieth Century	Local
CBS	Winter	local programming						Lamp Unto My Feet	Look Up and Live	Camera Three	local programming		Face the Nation In COLOR	CBS Sports In COLOR and/or local programming			CBS Sports Spectacular In COLOR	CBS Sports In COLOR and/or local programming				Mister Ed	Ted Mack's Amateur Hour	The Twentieth Century	Local
NBC	Fall	local programming										Open Mind		Meet the Press In COLOR	Frontiers of Faith / Eternal Light / Catholic Hour	Wild Kingdom In COLOR	College Bowl In COLOR	AFL on NBC In COLOR and/or local						**The Frank McGee Report** In COLOR	The Bell Telephone Hour / Actuality Specials In COLOR (continued into primetime)
NBC	Winter	local programming										Open Mind		Meet the Press In COLOR	Frontiers of Faith / Eternal Light / Catholic Hour	NBC Sports In COLOR and/or local programming				Sports in Action		Wild Kingdom In COLOR	College Bowl In COLOR	**The Frank McGee Report** In COLOR	The Bell Telephone Hour / Actuality Specials In COLOR (continued into primetime)
NBC	Summer	local programming										Open Mind		Meet the Press In COLOR	Frontiers of Faith / Eternal Light / Catholic Hour	NBC Sports In COLOR and/or local programming						Vietnam Weekly Report	Sportsman's Holiday	**The Frank McGee Report** In COLOR	The Bell Telephone Hour / Actuality Specials In COLOR (continued into primetime)

== By network ==
=== ABC ===
Returning series:

- ABC News
- Annie Oakley (reruns)
- Beany and Cecil (reruns)
- The Bugs Bunny Show (reruns)
- The Bullwinkle Show (reruns)
- The Donna Reed Show (reruns)
- Directions '66
- Discovery
- Father Knows Best (reruns)
- General Hospital
- Hoppity Hooper
- Issues and Answers
- News with the Woman's Touch
- The New Casper Cartoon Show
- The New American Bandstand 1966
- Peter Jennings with the News
- The Porky Pig Show
- Shenanigans
- A Time for Us
- Where the Action Is
- The Young Marrieds

New series:

- **Arlene Dahl's Beauty Spot**
- **The Beatles**
- **Ben Casey** (reruns)
- **Confidential for Women**
- **Dark Shadows**
- **The Dating Game**
- **Hello, Peapickers starring Tennessee Ernie Ford**
- **The Magilla Gorilla Show** (reruns)
- **The Milton the Monster Show**
- **Never Too Young**
- **The Newlywed Game**
- **The Nurses**
- **The Rebus Game**
- **Shenanigans**
- **Supermarket Sweep**
- **The Young Set**

Not returning from 1964-65:

- Buffalo Bill, Jr. (reruns)
- Day in Court
- Get the Message
- Hello, Peapickers starring Tennessee Ernie Ford
- The Magic Land of Allakazam
- Missing Links
- The Price Is Right (returned in 1972 on CBS)
- Trailmaster Wagon Train reruns

=== CBS ===
Returning series:

- Andy Of Mayberry (reruns)
- Art Linkletter's House Party
- As the World Turns
- Camera Three
- Captain Kangaroo
- The CBS Saturday News
- CBS Evening News
- CBS Morning News with Mike Wallace
- CBS News
- The Edge of Night
- Face the Nation
- The Guiding Light
- The Heckle and Jeckle Cartoon Show
- I Love Lucy (reruns)
- Lamp Unto My Feet
- Lassie (reruns)
- Linus the Lionhearted
- Look Up and Live
- Love of Life
- Mighty Mouse Playhouse
- My Friend Flicka (reruns)
- Password
- The Quick Draw McGraw Show (reruns)
- The Real McCoys (reruns)
- Search for Tomorrow
- The Secret Storm
- Sky King (reruns)
- Tennessee Tuxedo and His Tales
- Ted Mack’s Amateur Hour
- To Tell the Truth

New series:

- **The Dick Van Dyke Morning Show** (reruns)
- **Tom and Jerry**

Not returning from 1964-65:

- The Alvin Show (reruns)
- The Jack Benny Daytime Show (reruns)
- The Jetsons (reruns) (moved to NBC)
- Mister Ed
- World War One

=== NBC ===
Returning series:

- Another World
- The Bell Telephone Hour / Actuality Specials (continued into primetime)
- Catholic Hour
- Concentration
- The Doctors
- Exploring
- Eternal Light
- The First Look
- Frontiers of Faith
- Fury (reruns)
- Jeopardy!
- The Jetsons (reruns) (moved from CBS)
- Let's Make a Deal
- Match Game
- Meet the Press
- Moment of Truth
- NBC News
- NBC Saturday Night News
- NBC Sunday Night News
- Open Mind
- Sports in Action
- The Today Show
- Top Cat (reruns)
- Underdog
- You Don't Say!

New series:

- **The Atom Ant Show**
- **Chain Letter**
- **Days of Our Lives**
- **Eye Guess**
- **Fractured Phrases**
- **Let's Play Post Office**
- **Morning Star**
- **Paradise Bay**
- **The Secret Squirrel Show**
- **Showdown**
- **Swinging Country**

Not returning from 1964-65:

- Call My Bluff
- The Danny Thomas Show/Make Room for Daddy (reruns)
- Dennis the Menace (reruns)
- Fireball XL5
- The Hector Heathcote Show
- I'll Bet
- The Loretta Young Theater (reruns)
- Profiles in Courage
- Say When!
- Truth or Consequences
- What's This Song?

== See also ==
- 1965-66 United States network television schedule (prime-time)
- 1965-66 United States network television schedule (late night)

== Sources ==
- Castleman & Podrazik, The TV Schedule Book, McGraw-Hill Paperbacks, 1984
- TV GUIDE, Volume 14, No. 25, New York Metropolitan Edition, June 18–24, 1966
