= 1963–64 United States network television schedule (daytime) =

The following is the 1963–64 daytime network television schedule for the three major English-language commercial broadcast networks in the United States covers. It the weekday daytime hours from September 1963 to August 1964.

Talk shows are highlighted in yellow, local programming is white, reruns of prime-time programming are orange, game shows are pink, soap operas are chartreuse, news programs are gold and all others are light blue. New series are highlighted in bold.

== Monday-Friday ==
Network		7:00 am	7:30 am	8:00 am	8:30 am	9:00 am	9:30 am	10:00 am	10:30 am	11:00 am	11:30 am	noon	12:30 pm	1:00 pm	1:30 pm	2:00 pm	2:30 pm	3:00 pm	3:30 pm	4:00 pm	4:30 pm	5:00 pm	5:30 pm	6:00 pm	6:30 pm
ABC	Fall	local								**The Price Is Right**	Seven Keys	The Tennessee Ernie Ford Show	Father Knows Best (R)	General Hospital	local		2:30 pm: Day in Court 2:55 pm: News with the Woman's Touch	Queen for a Day	Who Do You Trust?	**Major Adams, Trailmaster** (R)		local		The ABC Evening News with Ron Cochran 6:15: local	local
ABC	Winter	local								**The Price Is Right**	**The Object Is**	Seven Keys	Father Knows Best (R)	The Tennessee Ernie Ford Show	local		2:30 pm: Day in Court 2:55 pm: News with the Woman's Touch	General Hospital	Queen for a Day	**Major Adams, Trailmaster** (R)		local		The ABC Evening News with Ron Cochran 6:15: local	local
ABC	Spring	local							The Price Is Right	**Get the Message**	Missing Links	Father Knows Best (R)	The Tennessee Ernie Ford Show	local			2:30 pm: Day in Court 2:55 pm: News with the Woman's Touch	General Hospital	Queen for a Day	**Major Adams, Trailmaster** (R)		local		The ABC Evening News with Ron Cochran 6:15: local	local
CBS	Fall	Local		Captain Kangaroo		local		**CBS Morning News with Mike Wallace**	I Love Lucy (R)	The Real McCoys (R)	Pete and Gladys (R)	12 Noon: Love of Life 12:25 pm: CBS News	12:30 pm: Search for Tomorrow 12:45 pm: The Guiding Light	local	As the World Turns	Password	Art Linkletter's House Party	3:00 pm: To Tell the Truth 3:25 pm: CBS News	The Edge of Night	The Secret Storm	The Lee Philip Show 4:30 to 4:45; Midwest affiliates only	local			**CBS Evening News**
CBS	Spring	Local		Captain Kangaroo		local		**CBS Morning News with Mike Wallace**	I Love Lucy (R)	The Real McCoys (R)	Pete and Gladys (R)	12 Noon: Love of Life 12:25 pm: CBS News	12:30 pm: Search for Tomorrow 12:45 pm: The Guiding Light	local	As the World Turns	Password	Art Linkletter's House Party	3:00 pm: To Tell the Truth 3:25 pm: CBS News	The Edge of Night	The Secret Storm	local				**CBS Evening News**
NBC	Fall	The Today Show				local		10:00 am: Say When!! 10:25 am: NBC News	**Merv Griffin's Word for Word** In COLOR	Concentration	**Missing Links** In COLOR	Your First Impression In COLOR	12:30 pm: Truth or Consequences (In COLOR starting 9/30) 12:55 pm: NBC News	local		2:00 p.m. People Will Talk In COLOR 2:25 pm: NBC News	The Doctors	The Loretta Young Theater (R)	You Don't Say! In COLOR	4:00 pm: The Match Game 4:25 pm NBC News	Make Room for Daddy (R)	local			The Huntley-Brinkley Report
NBC	Winter	The Today Show				local		10:00 am: Say When!! 10:25 am: NBC News	**Merv Griffin's Word for Word** In COLOR	Concentration	**Missing Links** In COLOR	Your First Impression In COLOR	12:30 pm: Truth or Consequences (In COLOR starting 9/30) 12:55 pm: NBC News	local		2:00 p.m. **Let's Make a Deal** In COLOR 2:25 pm: NBC News	The Doctors	The Loretta Young Theater (R)	You Don't Say! In COLOR	4:00 pm: The Match Game 4:25 pm NBC News	Make Room for Daddy (R)	local			The Huntley-Brinkley Report
NBC	Spring	The Today Show				local		10:00 am: Say When!! 10:25 am: NBC News	**Merv Griffin's Word for Word** In COLOR	Concentration	**Jeopardy!** In COLOR	Your First Impression In COLOR	12:30 pm: Truth or Consequences (In COLOR starting 9/30) 12:55 pm: NBC News	local		2:00 p.m. **Let's Make a Deal** In COLOR 2:25 pm: NBC News	The Doctors	The Loretta Young Theater (R)	You Don't Say! In COLOR	4:00 pm: The Match Game 4:25 pm NBC News	Make Room for Daddy (R)	local			The Huntley-Brinkley Report
NBC	Summer	The Today Show				local		Make Room for Daddy (R)	10:30 am Merv Griffin's Word for Word In COLOR 10:55 am NBC News	Concentration	**Jeopardy!** In COLOR	Say When!! In COLOR	12:30 pm: Truth or Consequences (In COLOR starting 9/30) 12:55 pm: NBC News	local	1:30 p.m. Let's Make a Deal In COLOR 1:55 pm: NBC News	The Loretta Young Theater (R)	The Doctors	**Another World**	You Don't Say! In COLOR	4:00 pm: The Match Game 4:25 pm NBC News	local				The Huntley-Brinkley Report

== Saturday ==
Network		6:00 am	6:30 am	7:00 am	7:30 am	8:00 am	8:30 am	9:00 am	9:30 am	10:00 am	10:30 am	11:00 am	11:30 am	noon	12:30 pm	1:00 pm	1:30 pm	2:00 pm	2:30 pm	3:00 pm	3:30 pm	4:00 pm	4:30 pm	5:00 pm	5:30 pm
ABC	Fall	local									The Jetsons (R)	**The New Casper Cartoon Show**	Beany and Cecil (R)	The Bugs Bunny Show (R)	The Magic Land of Allakazam	My Friend Flicka (R)	The New American Bandstand		local						
ABC	Winter	local									The Jetsons (R)	**The New Casper Cartoon Show**	Beany and Cecil (R)	The Bugs Bunny Show (R)	The New American Bandstand		local								
ABC	May	local									The Magic Land of Allakazam	**The New Casper Cartoon Show**	Beany and Cecil (R)	The Bugs Bunny Show (R)	The New American Bandstand		local								
CBS	Fall	local programming	Sunrise Semester	local programming		Captain Kangaroo		The Alvin Show (R)	**Tennessee Tuxedo and His Tales**	**The Quick Draw McGraw Show** (R)	Mighty Mouse Playhouse	The Adventures of Rin Tin Tin (R)	The Roy Rogers Show (R)	Sky King (R)	**Do You Know?**	The CBS Saturday News	CBS Sports and/or local								
CBS	Summer	local programming	Sunrise Semester	local programming		Captain Kangaroo		The Alvin Show (R)	**Tennessee Tuxedo and His Tales**	**The Quick Draw McGraw Show** (R)	Mighty Mouse Playhouse	The Adventures of Rin Tin Tin (R)	The Roy Rogers Show (R)	Sky King (R)	The CBS Saturday News	CBS Sports and/or local									
NBC	Fall	local							The Ruff and Reddy Show (R) In COLOR	**The Hector Heathcote Show** In COLOR	**Fireball XL5**	**Dennis the Menace** (R)	Fury (R)	**Sergeant Preston of the Yukon** (R)	The Bullwinkle Show In COLOR	Exploring		Watch Mr. Wizard	local						
NBC	Spring	local							The Ruff and Reddy Show (R) In COLOR	**The Hector Heathcote Show** In COLOR	**Fireball XL5**	**Dennis the Menace** (R)	Fury (R)	The Bullwinkle Show In COLOR	Watch Mr. Wizard	local									

== Sunday ==
Network		7:00 am	7:30 am	8:00 am	8:30 am	9:00 am	9:30 am	10:00 am	10:30 am	11:00 am	11:30 am	noon	12:30 pm	1:00 pm	1:30 pm	2:00 pm	2:30 pm	3:00 pm	3:30 pm	4:00 pm	4:30 pm	5:00 pm	5:30 pm	6:00 pm	6:30 pm
ABC	Fall	local programming											Discovery	Directions '64	Issues and Answers	AFL on ABC and/or local									
ABC	Winter	local programming												Discovery	Issues and Answers	Directions '64	ABC Sports and/or local								
ABC	Summer	local programming												Discovery	Issues and Answers	ABC Sports and/or local									
CBS	Fall	local programming						Lamp Unto My Feet	Look Up and Live	Camera Three	local programming		Face the Nation	NFL on CBS and/or local programming								CBS Sports Spectacular	Ted Mack's Amateur Hour	The Twentieth Century	Mister Ed
CBS	Winter	local programming						Lamp Unto My Feet	Look Up and Live	Camera Three	local programming		Face the Nation	local programming			CBS Sports Spectacular	CBS Sports and/or local programming					Ted Mack's Amateur Hour	The Twentieth Century	Mister Ed
CBS	Spring	local programming						Lamp Unto My Feet	Look Up and Live	Camera Three	local programming		Face the Nation	CBS Sports and/or local programming								CBS Sports Spectacular	Ted Mack's Amateur Hour	The Twentieth Century	Mister Ed
NBC	Fall	local programming										Youth Forum	local programming		Frontiers of Faith / Eternal Light / Catholic Hour	local programming		Open Mind		NBC Sports and/or local programming			**College Bowl**	Meet the Press	local programming
NBC	November	local programming										Youth Forum	local programming		Frontiers of Faith / Eternal Light / Catholic Hour	Open Mind		NBC Sports and/or local programming					**College Bowl**	Meet the Press	local programming
NBC	Spring	local programming												Youth Forum	Frontiers of Faith / Eternal Light / Catholic Hour	Open Mind		NBC Sports and/or local programming					**College Bowl**	Meet the Press	local programming
NBC	Summer	local programming												Youth Forum	Frontiers of Faith / Eternal Light / Catholic Hour	Open Mind		NBC Sports and/or local programming					**Sunday**	Meet the Press	**New York: Illustrated**

== By network ==
=== ABC ===
**Returning Series**

- Beany and Cecil (reruns)
- The Bugs Bunny Show (reruns)
- Day in Court
- Directions
- Discovery
- Father Knows Best (reruns)
- General Hospital
- Issues and Answers
- The Jetsons (reruns)
- The Magic Land of Allakazam
- Missing Links (moved from NBC)
- My Friend Flicka (reruns)
- The New American Bandstand
- Queen for a Day
- The Price Is Right (moved from NBC)
- Seven Keys
- The Tennessee Ernie Ford Show
- Who Do You Trust?

**New Series**

- **Get the Message**
- **Major Adams, Trailmaster** (reruns)
- **The New Casper Cartoon Show**
- **The Object Is**

**Not Returning From 1962-63**

- American Newsstand
- Camouflage
- Jane Wyman Presents (reruns)
- Yours for a Song

=== CBS ===
**Returning Series**

- The Adventures of Rin-Tin-Tin (reruns)
- The Alvin Show (reruns)
- Art Linkletter's House Party
- As the World Turns
- Camera Three
- Captain Kangaroo
- The CBS Saturday News
- The Edge of Night
- Face the Nation
- The Guiding Light
- Lamp Unto My Feet
- Look Up and Live
- Love of Life
- I Love Lucy (reruns)
- The McCoys (reruns)
- Mighty Mouse Playhouse
- NFL on CBS
- Password
- Pete and Gladys (reruns)
- The Roy Rogers Show (reruns)
- Search for Tomorrow
- The Secret Storm
- Sky King (reruns)
- Sunrise Semester
- Ted Mack's Amateur Hour
- To Tell the Truth
- The Twentieth Century

**New Series**

- **CBS Morning News with Mike Wallace**
- **CBS Evening News**
- **Do You Know?**
- **The Quick Draw McGraw Show** (reruns)
- **Tennessee Tuxedo and His Tales**

**Not Returning From 1962-63**

- Calendar
- College Bowl (moved to NBC)
- The Millionaire (reruns)
- The Reading Room

=== NBC ===
**Returning Series**

- The Bullwinkle Show
- Catholic Hour
- College Bowl (moved from CBS)
- Concentration
- The Doctors
- Eternal Light
- Exploring
- Frontiers of Faith
- Fury (reruns)
- The Loretta Young Theater
- Make Room for Daddy (reruns)
- The Match Game
- Meet the Press
- Open Mind
- People Will Talk
- The Ruff and Reddy Show (reruns)
- Say When!!
- The Today Show
- Truth or Consequences
- Watch Mr. Wizard
- You Don't Say!
- Your First Impression
- Youth Forum

**New Series**

- **Another World**
- **Dennis the Menace** (reruns)
- **Fireball XL5**
- **The Hector Heathcote Show**
- **Jeopardy!**
- **Let's Make a Deal**
- **Merv Griffin's Word for Word**
- **Missing Links** (moved to ABC)
- **Sergeant Preston of the Yukon** (reruns)

**Not Returning From 1962-63**

- Ben Jerrod
- Continental Classroom
- Here's Hollywood
- King Leonardo and His Short Subjects
- Marx Magic Midway
- The Merv Griffin Show
- Play Your Hunch
- The Price Is Right (moved to ABC)
- The Shari Lewis Show
- Young Doctor Malone

== See also ==
- 1963-64 United States network television schedule (prime-time)
- 1963-64 United States network television schedule (late night)

== Sources ==
- https://web.archive.org/web/20071015122215/http://curtalliaume.com/abc_day.html
- https://web.archive.org/web/20071015122235/http://curtalliaume.com/cbs_day.html
- https://web.archive.org/web/20071012211242/http://curtalliaume.com/nbc_day.html
