= ABC Daytime =

Daytime programming block on ABC

- Industry: Television broadcast
- Headquarters: New York City, New York, United States
- Key people: Rebecca Campbell (president)
- Parent: American Broadcasting Company (The Walt Disney Company)

ABC Daytime (sometimes shortened to ABC-D or ABCD) is a division responsible for the daytime television programming block on the ABC Network and syndicated programming. The block has historically encompassed soap operas, game shows and talk shows.

== History ==
ABC Daytime is the daytime programming division of the American Broadcasting Company (ABC) television network, which has been in operation since 1948. ABC Daytime originally began as a block of programming featuring game shows and soap operas, and it quickly became a popular destination for viewers during the daytime hours.

Brian Frons became president of ABC Daytime in 2002.

- When Megan McTavish returned as Head Writer of All My Children in July 2003, she faced criticism for a story that depicted the rape of a lesbian character, Bianca Montgomery. The show also faced opposition to a story of a transgender character in 2006.
- The Writers Guild of America East filed arbitration suits against ABC Daytime, claiming that they violated the strike-termination agreement by retaining replacement writers (those who choose Financial Core Status) who filled in during the strike (including Frons) on All My Children instead of bringing back the writers who had been on strike. "The strike-termination agreement does not allow the retention of replacement writers in lieu of allowing striking writers to return to their jobs. [ABC Daytime] are clearly violating this agreement," said Ira Cure, senior counsel for the Writers Guild of America, East, in a statement. "They have left us no other option but to file arbitrations to ensure that our members will be afforded their rights outlined under this agreement."

In May 2006, ABC Daytime was enlarged with the addition of Soapnet and ABC Media Productions. ABC Daytime was criticized by Susan Lucci for putting profits above their legacy for the 2011 cancellations of All My Children and One Life to Live in favor of lower-cost talk programming such as The Chew. ABC Daytime was folded into ABC Entertainment in 2011.

Times Square Studios (TSS) was created on December 2, 2011, under Vicki Dummer to oversee operations of ABC Daytime and the syndication programs replacing separate daytime and syndicated units. Times Square took over ABC Daytime when Frons' employment contract ended in January 2012. Except for Live with Kelly and Ryan, Times Square took over their remaining soap, all ABC syndicated and lifestyle shows. On October 30, 2014, The View talk show was transferred into Lincoln Square Productions, an ABC News subsidiary, from ABC Entertainment after struggling in ratings and a change in hosts.

Another popular show in the ABC Daytime lineup was the soap opera All My Children which aired from 1970 to 2011. The show was known for its dramatic storylines, complex characters, and talented cast of actors. All My Children helped to establish ABC as a leader in daytime programming, and it won numerous awards and accolades over the years.

ABC Daytime has featured a number of other popular shows over the years, including General Hospital, The View and One Life to Live. These shows have helped to establish ABC as a leader in daytime programming, and they have attracted a large and dedicated audience of viewers.

Times Square Studios reverted to the ABC Daytime name by the time of the appointment of ABC Owned Television Station President Rebecca Campbell as president of ABC Daytime, which still contains syndication, as an additional position.

== Current programs ==
=== Talk shows ===
==== The View ====
- Debut: August 11, 1997
- Replaced program: Caryl & Marilyn: Real Friends
- Taping location: New York City
- Creators: Barbara Walters, Bill Geddie
- Producing Team: Brian Teta
- Directing Team: Mark Gentile
- Current Hosts: Whoopi Goldberg (moderator), Joy Behar, Sunny Hostin, Sara Haines, Alyssa Farah Griffin and Ana Navarro

==== GMA3 ====
- Debut: September 10, 2018
- Replaced program: The Chew
- Taping location: New York City
- Creators: James Goldston and Catherine McKenzie
- Producing Team: Justin Dial (senior executive producer) and Catherine McKenzie (both)
- Directing Team: Lily Olszewski
- Current Hosts: Various GMA anchors and contributors

=== Soap opera ===
==== General Hospital ====
- Debut: April 1, 1963
- Replaced program: Yours for a Song
- Taping location: Los Angeles
- Creators: Frank and Doris Hursley
- Producing team: Frank Valentini (executive producer)
- Directing team: Jillian Dedote, Tina Keller, Rory Kramer, Robert Markham, Allison Reames Smith, Gary Tomlin, Denise Van Cleave
- Head writers: Elizabeth Korte and Chris Van Etten
- Other writers: Nigel Campbell, Emily Culliton, Suzanne Flynn, Cathy Lepard, Stacey Pulwer, Scott Sickles, Micah Steinberg, Ryan Quan
- Casting director: Mark Teschner
- Cast: List of General Hospital cast members

=== Schedule ===
11:00 am – 12:00 pm	The View
1:00 pm – 2:00 pm	GMA3
2:00 pm – 3:00 pm	General Hospital

NOTE: All times are Eastern; local schedules may differ.

== Former shows on ABC Daytime ==
=== Soap operas ===
- A Flame in the Wind (retitled A Time For Us) (1964–1966)
- A World Apart (1970–1971)
- All My Children (1970–2011)
- Confidential for Women (1966)
- Dark Shadows (1966–1971)
- Loving (1983–1995)
- Never Too Young (1965–1966)
- One Life to Live (1968–2012)
- Port Charles (1997–2003)
- Ryan's Hope (1975–1989)
- The Best of Everything (1970)
- The City (1995–1997)
- The Edge of Night (1975–1984)
- The Nurses (1965–1967)
- The Young Marrieds (1964–1966)

=== Game shows ===
ABC Daytime has not had a regular daytime game show block since 1986, and has not had any daytime game shows since a revival of Match Game ended in 1991.

- The $10,000 Pyramid (1974–1976) and The $20,000 Pyramid (1976–1980)
- About Faces (1960–1961)
- All-Star Blitz (1985)
- Baby Game (1968)
- Bargain Hunters (1987)
- Beat the Clock (1958–1961)
- The Better Sex (1977–1978)
- The Big Showdown (1974–1975)
- Blankety Blanks (1975)
- Break the Bank (1976)
- Bruce Forsyth's Hot Streak (1986)
- Camouflage (1961–1962)
- Chance for Romance (1958)
- The Dating Game (1965–1973)
- Double Talk (1986)
- Dream House (1968–1970)
- Everybody's Talking (1967)
- Family Feud (1976–1985)
- Funny You Should Ask (1968–1969)
- The Family Game (1967)
- Get the Message (1964)
- The Honeymoon Race (1967)
- Hot Seat (1976)
- How's Your Mother-in-Law? (1967–1968)
- Let's Make a Deal (1968–1976)
- Match Game (1990–1991)
- Missing Links (1964)
- The Money Maze (1974–1975)
- Mother's Day (1958–1959)
- Number Please (1961)
- One in a Million (game show) (1967)
- The Neighbors (1975–1976)
- The Newlywed Game (1966–1974, 1984)
- The Object Is (1963–1964)
- Pantomime Quiz (1959)
- Password (1971–1975)
- The Price is Right (1963–1965)
- Queen for a Day (1960–1964)
- Rhyme and Reason (1975–1976)
- Second Chance (1977)
- Seven Keys (1961–1964)
- Showoffs (1975)
- Split Second (1972–1975)
- Supermarket Sweep (1965–1967)
- Temptation (1967–1968)
- Trivia Trap (1984–1985)
- Who Do You Trust? (1957–1963)
- You Don't Say! (1975)
- Yours for a Song (1961–1963)

=== Talk shows and lifestyle programming ===
- Caryl & Marilyn: Real Friends (1996–1997)
- The Chew (2011–2018)
- The Children's Doctor (1967–1969)
- The Dick Cavett Show (1968–1969)
- Don McNeill's Breakfast Club (1954–1955)
- Fame, Fortune and Romance (1986–1987)
- Good Afternoon America (2012)
- Home (1988–1994)
- Lifestyles of the Rich and Famous (1986)
- Mike and Maty (1994–1996)
- The Don Ho Show (1976)
- The Liberace Show (1958–1959)
- Paul Dixon Show (1952)
- The Peter Lind Hayes Show (1958–1959)
- The Revolution (2012)

=== Other scripted originals ===
- The ABC Afternoon Playbreak (specials, 1973–1975)
- ABC Afterschool Special (specials, 1972–1996)
- Day In Court (1958–1965)
- New Love, American Style (1985–1986)

== Executives ==
Gail Starkey; Beth Wicke; Sue Johnson; Barbara Bloom (Vice President of Daytime Programming: 1996–2000); Mary Burch (Director of Daytime Programming)

Name	Title	Years	Notes
Armand Grant	President of Daytime Programming	1960–1965	
Harve Bennett	President of Daytime Programming	1965–1967	
Leonard Goldberg	President of Daytime Programming	1967–1968	
Marshall H. Karp	Vice President of Daytime Programming	1969–1971	
Michael Eisner	Vice President of Daytime Programming	1971–1972	
Brandon Stoddard	Vice President of Daytime Programming	1972–1974	
Michael Brockman	Vice President of Daytime Programming	1974–1977	
Jackie Smith	Vice President of Daytime Programming	1977–1988	
Jo Ann Emmerich	Vice President of Daytime Programming	1988–1991	
Charlotte Koppe	Vice President of Daytime Programming	1991-1994	
Patricia Fili-Krushel	President of Daytime Programming	1993–1998	Served until she resigned to join an internet company. During her tenure, the network published the 1995 New York Times bestseller General Hospital tie-in novel Robin Scorpio and debuted the General Hospital spin-off Port Charles.
Felicia Minei Behr	Vice President of Daytime Programming	1999–2002	
Angela Shapiro	President of Daytime Programming	1998–2002	The co-founder of Soap Opera Digest who had been ABC's Senior Vice President of Marketing and Promotion since 1995. Assumed the position of President in 2000. Called "a champion of the soap fans", Shapiro is credited with adapting the prime time series practice of "refreshers" and "previews" — recapitulation the previous episode immediately before showing the current one and previewing the next episode at the end – and applying the concept to daytime serials. The idea is still in use today, and other networks have adopted it. Shapiro also utilized the established interconnection of ABC's three soap operas (General Hospital, One Life to Live, and All My Children) in a bolder synergy concept designed to "entice viewers to tune into soap operas that they might not have usually watched." Over the course of six months in 2000, Daytime Emmy Award-winner Linda Dano's character Rae Cummings crossover among all four ABC daytime series. Shapiro also created ABC Super Soap Weekend, a fan event held at Walt Disney World in Florida from 1996 (the year The Walt Disney Company bought ABC) to 2008. She left ABC Daytime in 2002 to head the ABC Family channel.
Brian Frons	President of Daytime Programming	8/2002–2011	Joined in August 2002. In May 2006 Frons was promoted to President of Daytime for the newly created Walt Disney Television, an entity overseeing all ABC and Disney networks and Soapnet. Cancelled All My Children and One Life to Live and replaced them with The Chew and The Revolution. In December 2011, Frons announced that he was resigning as president after nine years with the network.
Vicki Dummer	Vice-President of Times Square Studios	2011–2020	Joined ABC in 1996. Cancelled lifestyle talk show The Revolution after less than 3 months on the air. Oversees duties of unscripted shows were transferred in 2013 to colleague Lisa Hackner, while General Hospital remains under Dummer's management. Dummer was let go along with Senior Vice President of ABC Daytime, William Burton, in December 2020. No replacement was announced.

== See also ==
- CBS Daytime
- NBC Daytime
