= Mark Wilson's Complete Course In Magic =

1975 book by Mark Wilson

Mark Wilson's Complete Course in Magic
- Cover of 1988 edition.
- Author: Mark Wilson
- Illustrator: Julia Laughlin; Manny Katz
- Cover artist: Weaver Lilly; Tony Schmidt
- Language: English
- Subject: Magic
- Genre: Non-fiction
- Publisher: Courage Books: Running Press Book Publishers
- Publication date: 1975
- Publication place: USA
- Pages: 472 pages
- ISBN: 0-89471-623-9
- OCLC: 17805952
- Dewey Decimal: 793.8 19
- LC Class: GV1547.W763 1988

Mark Wilson's Complete Course in Magic is a book on magic written by magician Mark Wilson. The book is a popular reference for magicians and has been in print since its first issue in 1975.

== Description of Mark Wilson's Complete Course in Magic ==
This description is based on the 1988 edition.

The book is organized into sections; each devoted to a particular topic, as follows:

=== Introductory sections ===
- Table of Contents
  - Listing of all sections and effects with page numbers.
  - This volume contains no index.
- Dedication
- Introductory Letter
  - Mark Wilson addresses his reader as "Dear Student," and expounds on his views of the basics of performance magic.
  - Throughout, Wilson refers to illusions as "tricks."

=== Biographies ===
- Mark Wilson
  - Nani Darnell Wilson (his wife and magician's assistant)
  - Greg Wilson (their son)
- Walter Gibson, co-author
- U.F. "Gen" Grant, co-author
- Larry Anderson, co-author
- Rakesh Menon, budding magician

=== Misdirection ===
Wilson's exposition on the basics of misdirection.

=== Acknowledgements and Credits ===
Course Coordinator: Larry Anderson
Assistant Course Coordinator: Don Wayne

=== Illusions (Tricks) ===
The main body of the book comprises tricks (Wilson's term) and prerequisite techniques and skills required to perform them. The key elements are illustrated with line drawings and explained in detail in the accompanying text.

Each trick is divided into logical sub-sections:

- Effect
  - What the audience is intended to see
- Secret and Preparation
  - Setting up the props, and how they work.
- Method
  - How the performer achieves the effect, step by step.
- Comments and Suggestions
  - Tips, pointers, and hard-won experience from the authors.

=== Card Magic ===
The section on card effects is divided into classes of tricks; each class contains multiple individual techniques and tricks, as follows:

- Card Magic
- Self-Working Card Tricks
- The Hindu Shuffle
- Overhand Shuffle
- Forcing A Card
- The Double Lift
- The Glide
- Double-Backed Card
- Double-Faced Card
- The Short Card
- Giant Cards
- Special Card Tricks
- Flourishes
- Genii Cards

=== Money Magic ===
As with Card Magic, the section on money effects is divided into classes of tricks; each class comprises multiple individual techniques and tricks, as follows:

- Money Magic
- Money Magic — Bills

=== Rope Magic ===
The section on rope effects is not divided, but comprises multiple individual techniques and tricks.

=== Silk & Handkerchief Magic ===
This section comprises multiple individual techniques and tricks.

=== Impromptu Magic ===
This section comprises multiple individual techniques and tricks, mainly with household objects readily at hand.

=== Mental Magic ===
This section comprises multiple individual techniques and tricks.

=== Betchas ===
This section comprises multiple individual techniques and tricks of the kind which the magician might bet he can do something the spectator cannot: "I'll bet you."

=== Make At Home Magic ===
This section comprises multiple individual techniques and tricks, requiring apparatus which can be constructed as build-it-yourself projects.

=== Sponge Ball Magic ===
This section comprises multiple individual techniques and tricks, requiring compressible balls as props.

=== Billiard Ball Magic ===
This section comprises multiple individual techniques and tricks with incompressible balls.

=== Cups & Balls ===
Perhaps the first illusions performed; definitely the first recorded in writing (in ancient Egypt). This section comprises multiple individual techniques and tricks.

=== Magical Illusions ===
"In magical terms an "Illusion" is any trick or effect involving a human being." (p. 435) This section comprises multiple individual illusions, according to the quoted definition.

=== Your Future In Magic ===
Wilson and co-authors' parting words of encouragement to their readers and students.
