= Patricia Fili-Krushel =

American businesswoman and media executive

Patricia Fili-Krushel (born 1953) is an American businesswoman and media executive. She is currently CEO of the Center for Talent Innovation and sits on the board of directors for Reddit, Dollar General and Chipotle Mexican Grill. Fili-Krushel has served as Chairman of the NBCUniversal News Group, Executive Vice President, Administration at Time Warner Inc., CEO of WebMD, President of the ABC Television Network, and President of ABC Daytime.

== Early life ==
Fili-Krushel attended St. John's University, graduating with a B. S. Degree. She earned an M.B.A. degree from Fordham University.

== Career ==
Fili-Krushel worked at HBO, where she became Vice President of Business Affairs and Production in December 1984. She then joined Lifetime Television in 1988 as both group vice president of Hearst/ABC-Viacom Entertainment Services (HAVES), and senior vice president of programming and production of Lifetime Television, where she was responsible for launching “the first network for women”.

Fili-Krushel joined ABC in 1993, as president of ABC Daytime (ABC-D)and then as network president. She was responsible for introducing the daytime talk show The View. While at ABC, she launched Soap Net, a 24-hour soap opera cable network.

She joined Time Warner in 2001. In 2006, she was inducted into the Museum of Television & Radio’s “She Made It” Collection. From 2012 until 2015 she was chairman of NBCUniversal news group.

In September 2012, Fili-Krushel made her second appearance on Fortune’s “50 Most Powerful Women” list.

In 2019, Fili-Krushel serves on the board of Dollar General Corporation, Chipotle Mexican Grill, The Public Theater of New York, where she is Vice Chair, PEN America, and the Berkshire International Film Festival.

Past service includes: board of directors of Lifetime Television, Central Park Conservancy, Oxygen Media, NowThis News, Fordham University, and Revere Media, as well as the executive committee and the board of governors of the Academy of Television Arts and Sciences, the Advertising Council and the National Campaign to Prevent Teen Pregnancy's Media Task Force. Pat is past president of New York Women in Film and TV.

Fili-Krushel has been named to Fortune’s “50 Most Powerful Women” list a number of times. She has been recognized by New York Women in Communications through their Matrix Awards. She is the recipient of the Women's Project & Productions' Women of Achievement Award, honored by the Police Athletic League as Woman of the Year, awarded the Women in Film Muse Award, and the Crystal Apple Award by the City of New York. She was named to Mayor Bloomberg's Commission on Women's Issues. In 2009, Harvard Business School published a case study on Pat; “Patricia Fili-Krushel: Traversing a Career Path.”

== Personal ==
Fili-Krushel currently lives in New York with her husband, Ken, and her two grown children.
