= The Tim Conway Show (1970 TV series) =

US television series - 1970

- The Tim Conway Show's title card, showing the Beechcraft Model 18 Lucky Linda in flight against the glare of the sun.
- Genre: Sitcom
- Created by: Kenny Solms; Gail Parent
- Starring: Tim Conway; Joe Flynn; Anne Seymour; Johnnie Collins III; Emily Banks; Fabian Dean; Dennis Robertson
- Theme music composer: Dan & Lois Dalton
- Composer: Jerry Fielding
- Country of origin: United States
- Original language: English
- No. of seasons: 1
- No. of episodes: 13

Production
- Producer: Burt Nodella
- Running time: 26 minutes
- Production companies: Timkel Enterprises, Inc./Andromeda Productions, in association with CBS

Original release
- Network: CBS
- Release: January 30 – June 12, 1970

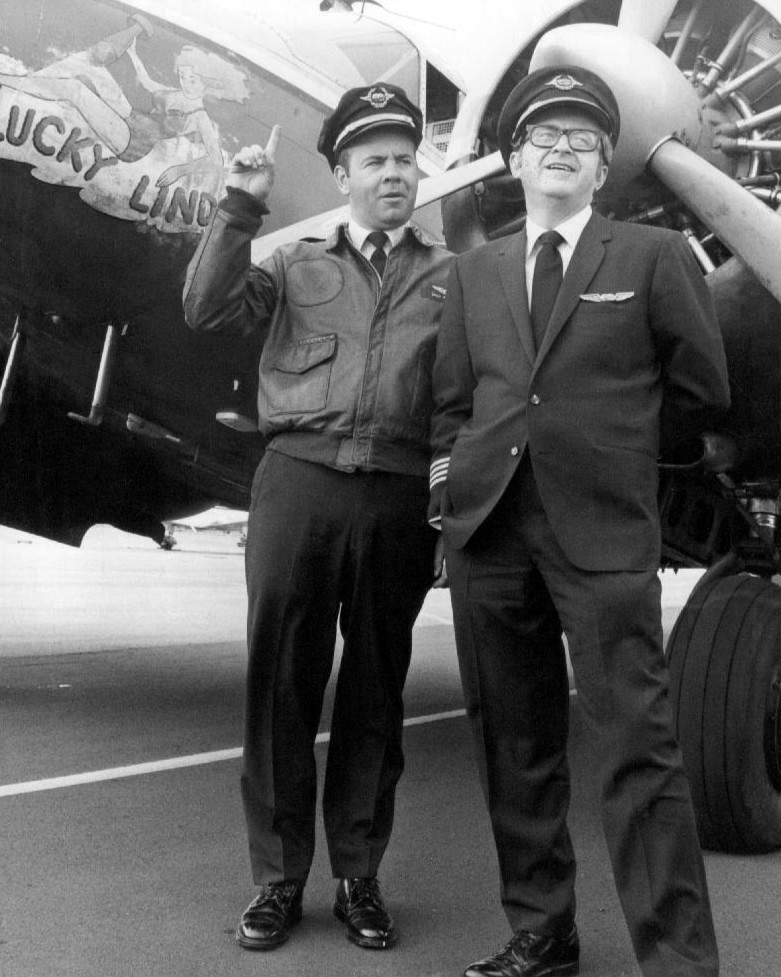
Tim Conway (left) and Joe Flynn in a publicity photo for The Tim Conway Show taken on January 9, 1970, in front of the Beechcraft Model 18 which appeared in the show as the Triple A Airlines airliner Lucky Linda.

The Tim Conway Show – the first of two television series of the name – is a 1970 American sitcom starring Tim Conway and Joe Flynn which centers on a single-plane charter airline. The show aired during periods between January 30, 1970, and June 12, 1970.

== Cast ==
- Tim Conway as Tim "Spud" Barrett
- Joe Flynn as Herbert T. Kenworth
- Anne Seymour as Mrs. K. J. Crawford
- Johnnie Collins III as Ronnie Crawford
- Emily Banks as Becky Parks
- Fabian Dean as Harry Wetzel
- Dennis Robertson as Sherman Bell

== Synopsis ==
Tim "Spud" Barrett is the well-meaning but bumbling chief pilot – in fact, the only pilot – and part-owner of Triple A Airlines, a charter airline based at Crawford Airfield in Los Angeles, California. His business partner, the inept co-owner and president of Triple A, is Herb Kenworth, who is cranky, terrified of flying, and prone to airsickness. Triple A – which stands for "Anywhere Anytime Airlines" – owns only one plane, a decrepit Beechcraft Model 18 named Lucky Linda, and is always on the verge of bankruptcy. Mrs. K. J. Crawford, a tough businesswoman, owns both Crawford Airfield and Crawford Airlines, a larger and more successful charter airline that is in direct competition with Triple A and based at the same airport; she also holds a mortgage on Lucky Linda. Her sycophantic son, Ronnie Crawford, helps her run the airport and her airline and is always trying to put Triple A out of business. Spud has a romantic interest in a Crawford Airlines employee, Becky Parks, who is friendly toward Triple A and helps Spud and Herb whenever she can. Spud and Herb often eat at the airport terminal's diner, the Chez Skyway, run by Harry Wetzel. Sherman Bell is the control tower operator.

== Production ==
Kenny Solms and Gail Parent created The Tim Conway Show, which paired Tim Conway and Joe Flynn in a situation comedy for the second time; they previously had starred together in McHale's Navy from 1962 to 1966 and in two theatrical films spun off from the series, McHale's Navy in 1964 and McHale's Navy Joins the Air Force in 1965. It was the second attempt at giving Conway a starring role in a situation comedy of his own after the unsuccessful Rango of 1967.

Burt Nodella produced the show. Episode directors included Harry Falk and Alan Rafkin, and writers included Frank Gill, Jr., Rudy De Luca, Barry Levinson, Craig T. Nelson, Gene Perret, William Raynor, and Myles Wilder. Jerry Fielding composed and conducted the theme music, and Dan and Lois Dalton wrote the title song.

== Broadcast history ==
The Tim Conway Show aired on CBS at 8:00 p.m. Eastern Time on Fridays throughout its run. The show replaced The Good Guys. It had a five-episode run in January and February 1970, then left the air until late April 1970, when it returned for another eight episodes that ran through mid-June 1970. The show drew low ratings and was cancelled after only 13 episodes. Reruns of He & She replaced it on the CBS schedule.

Almost simultaneously with the cancellation of The Tim Conway Show, Tim Conway accepted an offer to host a new comedy-variety show, The Tim Conway Comedy Hour. It aired during the fall of 1970, but was equally unsuccessful.

== Episodes ==
The Tim Conway Show ran for 13 episodes:

No.	Title	Directed by	Written by	Original release date
1	"To Cuba with Love"	Unknown	Unknown	January 30, 1970
After Spud and Herb load supplies aboard Lucky Linda for a flight to a mining camp on a remote ranch in Arizona, a mysterious passenger also comes aboard for the trip. They soon discover that he is from Cuba, and become so consumed with the fear that he might hijack the plane that they scramble around until they accidentally lock themselves out of the cockpit while in flight. Joan Crawford plays herself in a cameo appearance.
2	"Mail Contract"	Alan Rafkin	William Raynor & Myles Wilder	February 6, 1970
Triple A competes against Crawford Airlines for a U.S. Mail contract, and after Spud agrees to care for a baby, he must bring the child aboard Lucky Linda during a check flight with a postal inspector. Peter Hobbs guest stars.
3	"Triple Indemnity"	Unknown	Unknown	February 13, 1970
Mrs. Crawford takes out a big life insurance policy on Spud and Herb, making them think she is plotting to get rid of them, and they begin to see every mishap as an attempt on their lives. Distracted by worry, Herb roars off in Lucky Linda without thinking about how he does not know how to land, and it is up to Spud to talk him down safely.
4	TBA	Unknown	Unknown	February 20, 1970
After Herb takes what he thinks will be an important executive position with a major airline, Spud accepts Mrs. Crawford′s offer to merge Triple A Airlines with Crawford Airlines – but then Herb changes his mind about taking the new job.
5	"All of Our Aircraft is Missing"	Harry Falk	Frank Gill, Jr.	February 27, 1970
After Ronnie threatens to foreclose on Lucky Linda, Herb secretly arranges for a friend to "steal" the plane in order to have more time to come up with the money to pay Ronnie — but complications ensue when Spud calls the police to report the plane stolen and Herb books a group of nuns for a charter flight to San Francisco before discovering that Lucky Linda really is missing. Edward Faulkner and Morgan Jones guest star.
6	"Gone Is My Co-Pilot"	Unknown	Unknown	April 24, 1970
Spud and Herb hire new staff for Triple A Airlines and sign a contract with a rock'n'roll star to fly her to her next concert, then become very nervous when they realize the contract stipulates that if they do not get her to the concert on time it will cost them $100,000 — and then everything goes wrong during the flight.
7	"The Boys in the Bandwagon"	Unknown	Unknown	May 1, 1970
Ronnie sabotages Triple-A Airlines by making a large but phony reservation with Triple A, leading Spud and Herb to hire away all of Crawford Airlines' employees – and Spud ends up posing as the bandleader Lawrence Welk.
8	"Up, Up and Away"	Unknown	Unknown	May 8, 1970
Spud and Herb mistake a television commercial director for a Federal Aviation Administration inspector, then get the chance to audition for him as stunt flyers.
9	"High and the Blighty"	Unknown	Unknown	May 15, 1970
Spud and Herb get a passenger they think can put in a good word for Triple-A Airlines with British royalty, so Spud poses as an Englishman with an upper-class accent to make a good impression on the passenger. During the flight, they learn that the cargo they are carrying includes a shipment of nitroglycerine, and before they can figure out what to do with it, Lucky Linda runs low on fuel and Spud develops a case of the hiccups.
10	"Five Card Spud"	Unknown	Unknown	May 22, 1970
Spud and Herb fly prospective buyers to what they believe is a new real estate development in the desert, but it turns out to be a ghost town and the front for a gambling operation. The criminals take Herb hostage, so Spud decides to try to free him by posing as an old prospector who has just struck it rich.
11	TBA	Unknown	Unknown	May 29, 1970
Triple-A Airlines is hired to fly a burro and a bale of hay to Mexico, and Spud and Herb worry that they are inadvertently becoming involved in a marijuana smuggling ring.
12	"Coffee, Tea or Pablum"	Unknown	Unknown	June 5, 1970
To win the business of a gourmet club, Spud and Herb set up a restaurant service aboard Lucky Linda with Spud posing as a famous French chef.
13	"A Star Is Airborne"	Unknown	Unknown	June 12, 1970
Despite Herb′s strong objections, Spud agrees to fly a pregnant woman to San Francisco and unknowingly picks up a stowaway cat that also is pregnant – and while Spud and a passenger help the cat deliver a litter of kittens aboard Lucky Linda during the flight, Herb is left alone in the cockpit to fly the plane by himself.
