= Emily Banks (actress) =

American actress and model (1938–2023)

- Born: Emily Ann Banks; January 23, 1938; Boston, Massachusetts, U.S.
- Died: September 17, 2023 (aged 85)
- Education: Cambridge High and Latin School; Simmons College
- Occupations: Actress; model
- Years active: 1960–1986
- Known for: Shore Leave; Gunfight in Abilene; Live a Little, Love a Little

Emily Ann Banks (January 23, 1938 – September 17, 2023) was an American actress and model. She is known for the films Gunfight in Abilene and Live a Little, Love a Little, and her appearance as Yeoman Tonia Barrows in the Star Trek episode "Shore Leave." She also appeared on The Tim Conway Show.

== Early life ==
Banks was born in Boston, Massachusetts. She attended Cambridge High and Latin School, and received her bachelor's degree from Simmons College in 1959.

== Career ==
Banks got her start in 1960, when she was elected Miss Rheingold, appearing in advertisements and promotions for Rheingold Beer. In 1963 she appeared as a model for the game show Say When!!.

== Death ==
Banks died on September 17, 2023, aged 85.

== Filmography ==
=== Film ===
Year	Film	Role	Notes
1966	The Plainsman	Louisa Cody	Western film
1967	Gunfight in Abilene	Amy Martin	Western film
1968	Live a Little, Love a Little	RKC&P Receptionist	
1970	Hell's Bloody Devils	Jill Harmon	
1986	The Check Is in the Mail	Travel agent	Comedy film

=== Television ===
Year	Title	Role	Notes
1961	Say When!!	Herself – Assistant	(as a model)
1966	Bob Hope Presents the Chrysler Theatre	Julie Thayer; Sister Monica	Episode: "Brilliant Benjamin Boggs"; Episode: "The Sister and the Savage"
1966	Star Trek: The Original Series	Yeoman Tonia Barrows	Episode: "Shore Leave"
1967	Mr. Terrific	Carol	Episode: "Harley and the Killer"
1967	Cowboy in Africa	Dr. Anne Marlow	Episode: "Stone Age Safari"
1968	The Wild Wild West	Arden Masterson	Episode: "The Night of the Avaricious Actuary"
1969	Dragnet	Ann Tipton	Episode: "Homicide: The Student"
1969	Death Valley Days	Margaret Hubble; Yolanda; Ellie Tugwell	Episode: "A Restless Man"; Episode: "The Understanding"; Episode: "Biscuits and Billy, the Kid"
1970	The Tim Conway Show	Becky	12 episodes
1970	Love, American Style	Jane (segment "Love and the Hypnotist")	Episode: "Love and the Hypnotist / Love and the Psychiatrist"
1968–1971	Mannix	Barbara West; Alyce Taggart	Episode: "To the Swiftest, Death"; Episode: "To Save a Dead Man"
1972	Bewitched	Betty	Episode: "The Truth, Nothing But the Truth, So Help Me, Sam"
1979	When Hell Was in Session	Betty Phillips	Television film
1980	Fantasy Island	Linda Smith	Episode: "PlayGirl / Smith's Valhalla"
1984	Knight Rider	Priscella Ragsdale	Episode: "Mouth of the Snake"
1985	Highway to Heaven	Betty	Episode: "A Song for Jason: Part"; Episode: "A Song for Jason: Part 2"
1985	Simon & Simon	Sally Crenshaw	Episode: "The Enchilada Express"
1986	Airwolf	Nurse Hilda	Episode: "The Girl Who Fell from the Sky"
