= Gunfight in Abilene =

1967 film by William Hale

- Film poster
- Directed by: William Hale
- Screenplay by: John D.F. Black; Bernie Giler
- Story by: Clarence Upson Young
- Produced by: Howard Christie
- Starring: Bobby Darin; Emily Banks; Leslie Nielsen; Don Galloway
- Cinematography: Maury Gertsman
- Edited by: Gene Palmer
- Music by: Bobby Darin
- Distributed by: Universal Pictures
- Release date: March 1967
- Running time: 86 minutes
- Country: United States
- Language: English

Gunfight in Abilene is a 1967 American Western film directed by William Hale and starring Bobby Darin in a non-singing role. It is the second film based on the short story "Gun Shy" by Clarence Upson Young, the first being Showdown at Abilene (1956), starring Jock Mahoney in the role played by Darin in the remake.

== Plot ==
During the Civil War, Cal Wayne accidentally kills a fellow Confederate soldier, who was also a long-time friend. After the war, Wayne returns to his hometown of Abilene, Kansas, where he discovers his sweetheart, Amy - who thought he was dead - about to marry cattle baron Grant Evers, the brother of the man Wayne killed. To try to assuage his guilt, Wayne refuses to try to win Amy back.

A feud is going on between local cattlemen and farmers. Evers takes it upon himself to exact harsh justice against anyone, with or without proof, who crosses him and his growing business.

Reluctantly, but at Evers' behest, Wayne replaces the corrupt sheriff, Joe Slade. Haunted by the fact that he killed Evers' brother, Wayne insists he will not wear a gun and wants everyone who comes into town to surrender their weapons.

However, as the situation between the farmers and the cattlemen intensifies and erupts, and Grant Evers is murdered, Wayne chooses to strap on a weapon and settle things for himself, and for Abilene.

== Cast ==
- Bobby Darin as Cal Wayne
- Emily Banks as Amy Martin
- Leslie Nielsen as Grant Evers
- Donnelly Rhodes as Joe Slade
- Don Galloway as Ward Kent
- Frank McGrath as Ned Martin
- Michael Sarrazin as Cord Decker
- Barbara Werle as Leann
- Johnny Seven as Loop
- Don Dubbins as Sprague

== See also ==
- List of American films of 1967
