= Nani Darnell =

American magician's assistant

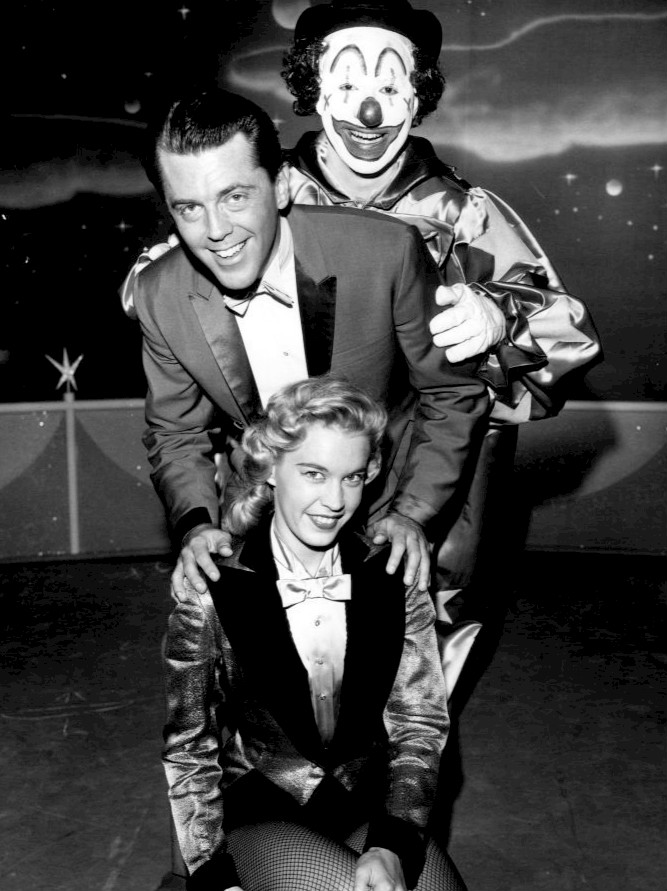
- Darnell (bottom) as part of The Magic Land of Allakazam cast in 1960
- Born: c. 1930; Toledo, Ohio, U.S.
- Other name: Nani Darnell Wilson
- Occupations: Magician's assistant, dancer, stewardess
- Spouse: Mark Wilson (m. 1952; died 2021)
- Children: 2, including Greg Wilson

Nani Darnell (born c. 1930) is an American former magician's assistant. As a co-star of her husband, magician Mark Wilson, throughout his television magic career, Darnell heavily influenced public perceptions of magicians' assistants.

== Biography ==
Darnell worked as a dancer and stewardess before marrying magician Mark Wilson in 1952.

The role that most defined Darnell's public image was as a magician's assistant in Wilson's television series The Magic Land of Allakazam, which premiered in October 1960 and ran for four years nationally in the United States. The series has been widely credited with establishing the credibility of magic as a form of television entertainment. In doing so, it also established Darnell as a nationally-known figure. She subsequently appeared with Wilson in a host of other television shows, including Magic Circus specials and the fictional mystery series The Magician starring Bill Bixby.

Darnell and Wilson had two children, both boys. Their younger son, Greg, followed in their footsteps by becoming a professional illusionist. As of 2011, Darnell and Wilson lived in Valencia, California. Wilson died in 2021.
