= Mark Wilson (magician) =

American magician and author (1929–2021)

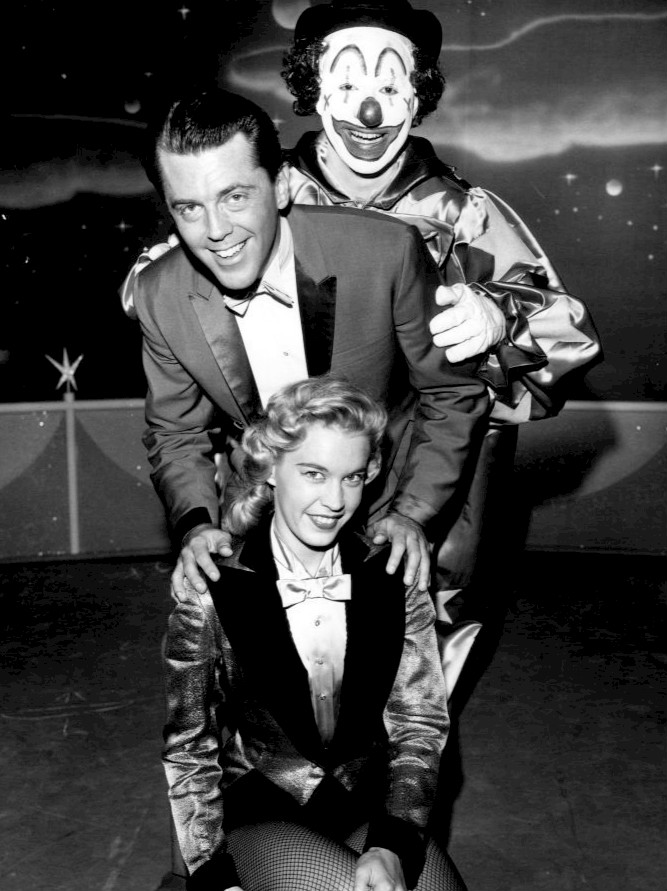
- Wilson (center) as part of The Magic Land of Allakazam cast in 1960
- Born: James Mark Wilson; April 11, 1929; Manhattan, New York, U.S.
- Died: January 19, 2021 (aged 91); Los Angeles, California, U.S.
- Education: Southern Methodist University
- Occupation: Magician
- Spouse: Nani Darnell (m. 1952)

James Mark Wilson (April 11, 1929 – January 19, 2021), known professionally as Mark Wilson, was an American magician and author. He was widely credited as the first major television magician, and in the process established the viability of illusion shows as a television format.

== Early years ==
Mark Wilson was the son of a salesman and he spent much of his youth traveling with his parents as his father moved about on business. He has said his interest in magic began when he was eight years old and saw a magician named Tommy Martin perform at a theater near a hotel in Indianapolis, where the Wilson family were staying at the time. The family later moved to Dallas, Texas, where, as a teenager, Wilson improved his magic knowledge by working for the Douglas Magicland shop as a clerk. As his skills improved he began performing magic shows at small functions.

He attended the School of Business Administration at Southern Methodist University, where he majored in marketing, learning skills that were to help him in his future career.

== Television ==
When television began to grow, Wilson launched a show titled Time for Magic on a local station in Dallas in 1955. Calling on his marketing training he made this show possible by attracting sponsorship from the Dr Pepper Bottling Company. He then expanded to other shows in Houston and San Antonio.

When videotape was developed, Wilson created the first show to be videotaped and nationally syndicated. That was the original black and white Magic Land of Allakazam. It debuted on 1 October 1960 on CBS-TV and aired every Saturday morning on that network for two years. His wife, Nani Darnell, assisted him and they were joined by Bev Bergeron, who helped write the shows and played the character Rebo the Clown. The show was sponsored by Kellogg's. Wilson, Darnell and Bergeron toured state fairs during the summer and made appearances on other network shows. The writing team grew at CBS to include Bobby "Torchy" Towner, Bobby Fenton, Leo Behnke, Lin Searles with Johnny Daniel and Carl Owen building the illusions for the first year of 39 shows. For the second year the existing creative team remained, but Frances Martineau was added along with a young John Gaughan. This group was the nucleus that brought a new look to magic illusions that are still being used today. Magic Land of Allakazam moved from CBS-TV to ABC-TV in 1962 without missing one week on air. That same year, Wilson appeared on the short-lived ABC western comedy and variety series The Roy Rogers and Dale Evans Show. In 1965, Magic Land of Allakazam left ABC and was internationally syndicated.

Wilson later created The Funny Face Magic Show and the Pillsbury Company sponsored Magic Circus in 1971. He also provided the Hall of Magic at the 1964/5 World's Fair in New York. He appeared on film at the Bell Telephone exhibit at the 1968 Hemisfair. He and his crew assisted in the technical production of the magic in many network shows, including The Magician, Circus of the Stars, Hollywood Palace, The Six Million Dollar Man, The Incredible Hulk, Columbo and more.

Wilson's last regular television stint was The Magic Of Mark Wilson. The series was seen in national syndication in 1981, and Wilson was aided on this final series by his wife and longtime assistant Nani and their second son, Greg. Mark and Nani made an appearance in 2015 in the second series of Penn & Teller: Fool Us, where they were part of the reveal of an act by their son Greg.

== Publication ==
In 1975, he published his Mark Wilson's Complete Course In Magic, which is still in production in various forms around the world.

== Bibliography ==
Mark Wilson is the author of the following titles published by Running Press:

- Magic In A Box (Paperback Jun 1, 2004) ISBN 978-0-7624-1612-7
- Mark Wilson's Complete Course In Magic (Paperback May 18, 2003) ISBN 978-0-7624-1455-0
- Mark Wilson's Little Book Of Card Tricks (Hardcover Nov 16, 2000) ISBN 978-0-7624-0834-4
- Mark Wilson's Cyclopedia Of Magic (Paperback Jan 25, 1996) ISBN 978-1-56138-613-0

== Awards ==
- The Academy of Magical Arts Magician of the Year (1972, 1974)
- The Academy of Magical Arts Masters Fellowship (1987)
