= Win with the Stars =

- Presented by: Allen Ludden
- Announcer: Jay Stewart
- Country of origin: United States
- No. of seasons: 1

Production
- Running time: 24 mins.
- Production company: Stuart Phelps-Jesse Martin Productions

Original release
- Network: Syndicated (weekly)
- Release: September 18, 1968 – September 1969

Win with the Stars is an American game show that ran in syndication from 1968–1969. The host was Allen Ludden, and the series was sponsored by local supermarkets.

== Gameplay ==
Two celebrity/contestant teams competed. Each team had 60 seconds to guess as many songs as they could, with an attempt to sing the first lines of those songs after each guess. Guessing the song title earned five points, with another point awarded per correct word in the first lines; if an incorrect word was sung, a horn (later used on The Hollywood Squares) was played and the team immediately stopped.

Three games were played in each episode in a tournament format, and the winner of the third game had his/her winnings doubled.

== Production ==
The show was a revival of a show originally produced for NBC in the daytime during the 1964-65 television season titled What's This Song?, hosted by Wink Martindale.
