= 1963–64 United States network television schedule (late night) =

These are the late-night schedules for all three networks for the 1963–64 season. All times are Eastern and Pacific.

Talk/Variety shows are highlighted in yellow, Local News & Programs are highlighted in white.

During the 1962–1963 season, Johnny Carson continued to host The Tonight Show on NBC, with Ed McMahon as his announcer.

Meanwhile, ABC debuted The Jerry Lewis Show on September 21, 1963, in the Saturday evening time slot from 9:30 PM to 11:30 PM. The show was canceled after just 13 weeks.

== Monday-Friday ==
| | 11:00 PM | 11:30 PM | 12:00 AM | 12:30 AM | 1:00 AM | 1:30 AM | 2:00 AM | 2:30 AM | 3:00 AM | 3:30 AM | 4:00 AM | 4:30 PM | 5:00 AM | 5:30 AM |
|---|---|---|---|---|---|---|---|---|---|---|---|---|---|---|
| ABC | local programming or sign-off |
| CBS | local programming or sign-off |
| NBC | 11:15 PM: The Tonight Show Starring Johnny Carson | | | | local programming or sign-off |

== Saturday ==
| | | 11:00 PM | 11:30 PM | 12:00 AM | 12:30 AM | 1:00 AM | 1:30 AM | 2:00 AM | 2:30 AM | 3:00 AM | 3:30 AM | 4:00 AM | 4:30 PM | 5:00 AM | 5:30 AM |
|---|---|---|---|---|---|---|---|---|---|---|---|---|---|---|---|
| ABC | Fall | The Jerry Lewis Show (started at 9:30) | local programming or sign-off |
| ABC | January | local programming or sign-off |

== By network ==
=== ABC ===
New Series

- The Jerry Lewis Show

Not returning from 1962-63

- ABC News Final

=== NBC ===
Returning Series

- The Tonight Show Starring Johnny Carson
