= 1965–66 United States network television schedule (late night) =

These are the late-night schedules for all three networks for the 1965–66 season. All times are Eastern and Pacific.

By the start of the 1965–66 season, there were three late-night shows competing for viewers: The Tonight Show starring Johnny Carson on NBC, ABC's Nightlife with Les Crane, and The Merv Griffin Show on Westinghouse stations and some independent channels.

NET is not included, as member television stations had local flexibility over most of their schedules, and broadcast times for network shows might have varied. ABC and CBS are not included on the weekend schedules because those networks did not offer late-night programs of any kind on the weekend.

Talk/Variety shows are highlighted in yellow, Local News & Programs are highlighted in white.

== Monday-Friday ==
-		11:00 PM	11:30 PM	12:00 AM	12:30 AM	1:00 AM	1:30 AM	2:00 AM	2:30 AM	3:00 AM	3:30 AM	4:00 AM	4:30 AM	5:00 AM	5:30 AM
ABC	Fall	Local	ABC's Nightlife with Les Crane			Local programming or sign-off
ABC	Winter	Local programming or sign-off
CBS		Local programming or sign-off
NBC		11:15 PM: The Tonight Show Starring Johnny Carson				local programming or sign-off

== Saturday/Sunday ==
-	11:15 PM	11:30 PM	12:00 AM	12:30 AM	1:00 AM	1:30 AM	2:00 AM	2:30 AM	3:00 AM	3:30 AM	4:00 AM	4:30 AM	5:00 AM	5:30 AM
NBC	11:15 PM: The Saturday Tonight Show/The Sunday Tonight Show				local programming or sign-off

== By network ==
=== ABC ===
Returning Series

- ABC's Nightlife with Les Crane

Not returning from 1964-65

- The Les Crane Show
- ABC's Nightlife

=== NBC ===
Returning Series

- The Saturday/Sunday Tonight Show
- The Tonight Show Starring Johnny Carson
