= Zoorama =

American television program

- Genre: Documentary
- Country of origin: United States
- Original language: English

Production
- Production locations: San Diego Zoo, San Diego, California
- Production company: San Diego Zoo Productions

Original release
- Network: CBS (later syndicated)
- Release: 1955 – 1970

Zoorama is an American television show that focused on wildlife and nature. The program was filmed at the San Diego Zoo and was produced between 1955 and 1970.

Zoorama was originally created for the local television market in San Diego, California, and it was picked up for national broadcast on CBS before being sold as a syndicated series. For most of its run, the series was hosted by San Diego television reporter Bob Dale.
