= What's This Song? =

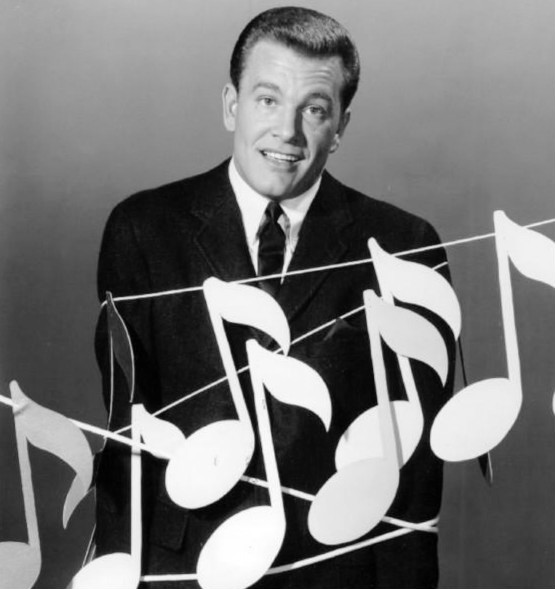
- Wink Martindale, 1964.
- Presented by: Wink Martindale
- Announcer: Steve Dunne
- Country of origin: United States
- No. of seasons: 1

Production
- Running time: 22–24 minutes
- Production company: Stuart Phelps-Jack Reeves-Jesse Martin Productions

Original release
- Network: NBC
- Release: October 26, 1964 – September 24, 1965

What's This Song? is an American game show that ran on NBC from October 26, 1964, to September 24, 1965. It was the first national game show hosted by Wink Martindale (although he was known as "Win" Martindale here). Monty Hall filled-in for one week.

== Gameplay ==
Two celebrity/contestant teams competed. A song was played, and if the team in control guessed its title correctly, they got 20 points and a chance to earn 20 more by singing the first two lines of the song they had identified.

After the team sang the first two lines, their opponents could challenge if they believed the lines sung were incorrect; a correct challenge earned that team the right to sing the first two lines for the 20 points, but an incorrect challenge penalized them 20 points.

The first team to reach 100 points won the game and $100.

=== Minute Medley ===
The winning team then had to name 10 songs in 60 seconds, with $20 awarded for each correct answer. Passing was allowed, to which the team could return if time permitted. Getting all ten awarded the $200 plus a trip to anywhere in North America.

Contestants remained until they lost two games.

== Revival ==
The show was revived from 1968-1969 as Win with the Stars, now with Allen Ludden as host.

== Episode status ==
The series is believed to have been destroyed as per network practices of the era. Two episodes are known to exist, and a clip of one episode was seen in a 2001 Today Show segment on game shows. Another episode features Carol Lawrence and Mel Tormé.
