= Gregory Wilson (magician) =

American magician

Gregory Wilson (born 1964/1965) is an American magician and two-time FISM award winner. Known as "The Honest Conman," Wilson specializes primarily in close-up magic, sleight-of-hand, and confidence trickery. He is the subject of a chapter in magician Paul Harris's book, Art of Astonishment, Vol. 1.

Wilson is a regular performer at the Magic Castle in Hollywood, but also performs at large corporate events, trade shows and private functions all over the world. He has been featured in numerous televised specials, including a featured role as a "resident wizard" on Syfy's magic series Wizard Wars with Penn & Teller.

Most recently Wilson has focused on golf magic, where he performs as The Golf Magician, at tournaments around the world. The tricks he performs are all golf-specific.

== Career ==
Billing himself as a "deception artist," Wilson began development in the mid-1980's on what would eventually become his signature "Criminal Act," with a focus on pick-pocketing, card-sharking, short-changing, street-swindling and mental manipulation. His work in these fields has been so extensive that he has given his Deception Detection lecture to U.S. federal law enforcement agencies (FBI, CIA, ATF, Secret Service, Homeland Security), as well as numerous state and local police departments who have all consulted him on matters related to his areas of expertise.

== Publications ==
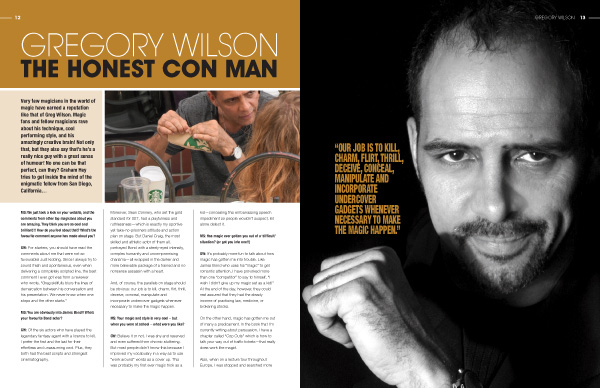
Wilson's feature in issue no. 48 of Magicseen

Having created nearly 500 original effects as of 2020, Wilson has published numerous books, notes, and videos teaching different types of sleight of hand, mind reading, and pickpocketing. He has also contributed to numerous journals, magazines, and books on the topic of performing magic, including a column for now-defunct The Magic Menu called "Gregory's Greetings."

== Career and publications ==
Wilson's extensive body of work is renowned worldwide, catering primarily to magicians of intermediate and advanced skill levels. Initially relying on major magic retailers for distribution, Wilson's published materials are now predominantly available through The Secret Source, a magic learning platform he founded in 1996.

== Legacy and publications ==
Wilson has contributed his works various publications, including:

- Magic
- Genii
- The Linking Ring
- M-U-M (published by The Society of American Magicians)
- Arcane (French periodical)
- The Penumbra
- The Magic Menu
- Channel One
- VANISH
- Labyrinth (A Journal of Close-Up Magic)
- Magicseen
- ELIXIR Magazine

== Awards and accolades ==
Wilson has received numerous accolades for his various magic innovations, as well as awards for competitive performances:

- Third Place, FISM 2000, Close-up Card magic
- Second Place, FISM 2003, Close-up Card magic
- Most Creative Magician of the Year, the International Brotherhood of Magicians, 1998
