= World War One (TV series) =

US television program

- Genre: War documentary
- Presented by: Robert Ryan
- Music by: Alfredo Antonini conducting the CBS Symphony Orchestra
- Composer: Morton Gould
- No. of episodes: 26

Production
- Producer: Isaac Kleinerman
- Editor: David Hanser
- Running time: 30 minutes

Original release
- Network: CBS

World War One is an American documentary television series that was shown on CBS during the 1964–1965 television season to commemorate the fiftieth anniversary of the start of the war.

== Background and Production ==
After putting together one of the largest collections of WWI footage, CBS News produced 26 half-hour episodes that cover the war beginning with the tensions leading up the war, the events of the conflict, and legacy of the war. The series used archival footage from various national and private archives, some of which were at that point being seen by the public for the first time. Instead of sound effects, an original music score was composed by Morton Gould, and performed by Alfredo Antonini conducting the CBS Symphony Orchestra.

World War One premiered on Tuesday nights at 8 pm Eastern Time. Mid-season it was moved to Sunday nights at 6:30 pm. Ratings competition from the second half-hour of ABC's Combat! and the second half-hour of NBC's Mr. Novak may have precipitated this time slot change.

== Overview ==
The series begins with a review of the rivalries and tensions between the major European powers from 1870 to 1914, which culminated with the assassination of Archduke Franz Ferdinand and his wife Sophie in the city of Sarajevo by members of the Serbian Black Hand.

The series then followed the course of the war, showing how more countries both in and out of Europe, such as Japan, the Ottoman Empire, Bulgaria, Romania and the United States, became involved in the war, as well as the war's various fighting fronts and campaigns.

Various episodes examined the German atrocities in Belgium, the war at sea, trench warfare, the Russian Revolution, the Italian Front, air warfare, America's entry into the war, the home fronts of the various participants, the music of that era, the war's final campaigns, and the war's legacy.

== Episode list ==
1. The Summer of Sarajevo (Original Air Date—22 September 1964)
2. The Clash of the Generals (Original Air Date—29 September 1964)
3. The Doomed Dynasties (Original Air Date—6 October 1964)
4. Atrocity 1914 (Original Air Date—13 October 1964)
5. They Sank the Lusitania (Original Air Date—27 October 1964)
6. Verdun the Inferno (Original Air Date—10 November 1964)
7. The Battle of Jutland (Original Air Date—17 November 1964)
8. The Trenches (Original Air Date—24 November 1964)
9. D-Day at Gallipoli (Original Air Date—1 December 1964)
10. America the Neutral (Original Air Date—8 December 1964)
11. Wilson and the War (Original Air Date—20 December 1964)
12. Revolution in Red (Original Air Date—27 December 1964)
13. Behind the German Lines (Original Air Date—3 January 1965)
14. Year of Lost Illusions (Original Air Date—10 January 1965)
15. Over There (Original Air Date—17 January 1965)
16. Over Here (Original Air Date—24 January 1965)
17. Daredevils and Dogfights (Original Air Date—31 January 1965)
18. The Agony of Caporetto (Original Air Date—14 February 1965)
19. Tipperary and All That Jazz (Original Air Date—21 February 1965)
20. The Promised Lands (Original Air Date—28 February 1965)
21. The Tide Turns (Original Air Date—7 March 1965)
22. The Battle of Argonne (Original Air Date—14 March 1965)
23. The Day the Guns Stopped Firing (Original Air Date—28 March 1965)
24. Wilson and Peace (Original Air Date—4 April 1965)
25. The Allies in Russia (Original Air Date—11 April 1965)
26. Heritage of War (Original Air Date—18 April 1965)

Source for episode list and air date
