= The Object Is... =

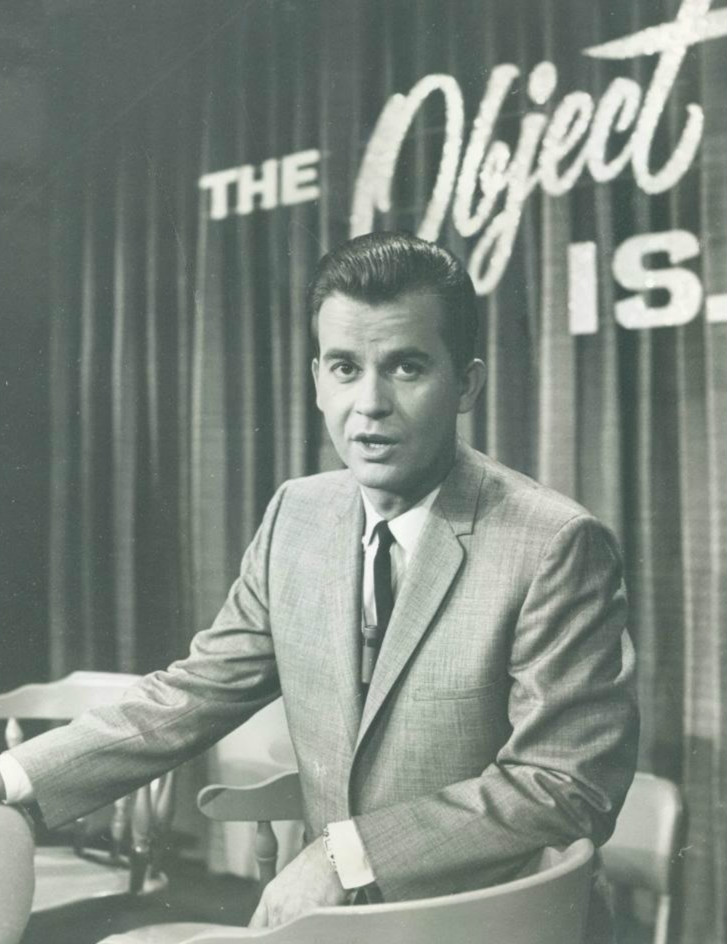
- Clark as host in 1963.
- Presented by: Dick Clark
- Country of origin: United States
- No. of episodes: 65 (+ Pilot)

Production
- Running time: approx. 26 Minutes
- Production companies: The Object Is, Inc.

Original release
- Network: ABC
- Release: December 30, 1963 – March 27, 1964

The Object Is... is a game show which aired on ABC from December 30, 1963 to March 27, 1964. The series was the first game for host Dick Clark. Mike Lawrence was the announcer.

== Gameplay ==
Three celebrities and three contestants competed in a game in which they tried to identify people (celebrities, historical figures, or fictional characters) from objects typically associated with that person. Each contestant played with two celebrities - one who gave a clue and one who received it.

For example, if the person were "Charles Lindbergh", a clue from the first celebrity might be "transatlantic airplane"; if the contestant guessed correctly, it would be worth ten points; if not, the contestant gave a clue to the second celebrity for seven points. Clues were worth ten points, then seven, then five, then three. If the subject was not guessed after the three-point clue, the subject was thrown out.

The first contestant to score fifteen points won US$75 (equivalent to $789 in 2025) and the right to team with a celebrity in the "Winner's Game", in which they attempted to identify as many celebrities associated with a particular object as possible in thirty seconds, earning US$5 (equivalent to $53 in 2025) for each correct answer.

Each of the other players earned US$5 (equivalent to $53 in 2025) per point, with all players competing for the entire episode, and the winner of the most cash returning to play again.

=== Changes ===
For the last two or three weeks of the run, the format changed to two celebrity-contestant teams (similar to Password) who tried to identify the person in a maximum of three clues for up to 10 points; they now played a two-out-of-three match, with each game worth US$100 (equivalent to $1,052 in 2025).

== Broadcast history ==
Object debuted on the second-to-last day of 1963 at 11:30 AM (10:30 Central), replacing the Jack Narz game Seven Keys in a scheduling shuffle. Object faced the same competition its predecessor did – the Ed McMahon-hosted Missing Links on NBC and local programming on CBS. While Links had a nearly four-month jump on Object, local programming managed to cause both games to bow in defeat on March 27, 1964.

The following Monday, however, showed there was a clear winner – Missing Links, which moved to ABC with Clark as host (McMahon was still under contract to NBC). Nine months later, Links fell to the Peacock's replacement series – Jeopardy!

== Episode status ==
Compared to most other game shows of the era, Object is completely intact – all 65 episodes, plus the pilot (taped November 26, 1963), are held by the UCLA Film & Television Archive.

Three episodes circulate among collectors – the premiere, the finale, and the second-to-last episode; notably, in the latter, Stubby Kaye promotes the debut of Shenanigans.
