= Moment of Truth (Canadian TV series) =

- Genre: Soap opera
- Written by: Clare Kennedy (initial episodes)
- Country of origin: Canada
- Original language: English
- No. of seasons: 1

Production
- Producer: John Trent
- Running time: 30 minutes

Original release
- Network: CBC Television
- Release: 28 December 1964 – 11 November 1965

Moment of Truth is a Canadian soap opera that aired on CBC Television from 1964 to 1965, and on NBC in the United States in 1965.

== Premise ==
The series was set in Ontario where clinical psychologist Dr. Robert Wallace (Douglass Watson) not only operated a private practice but taught his subject field at the local university. His wife Nancy (Louise King) and their children Johnny (Michael Dodds) and Sheila (Barbara Pierce) were also primary series characters. Other characters included Lila (Sandra Scott) who was Nancy's sister, Eric Brandt (John Horton), Dexter Elliot (Chris Wiggins), Linda Harris (Anna Hagan), Dean Hogarth (Cec Linder), Walter Leeds (Robert Goodier), Wilma Leeds (Lynne Gorman), Jack Williams (Stephen Levy) and Carol Williams (Toby Tarnow). Doctor characters included Vincent Conway (Peter Donat), Russell Wingate (Ivor Barry) and Gil Bennett (John Bethune). As many as 60 different characters could be seen during a week of the series.

== Production ==
Moment of Truth was recorded at Robert Lawrence Productions in Toronto and produced by John Trent. Clare Kennedy wrote the early episodes.

== Scheduling ==
This half-hour series was broadcast weekday afternoons at varying times from 28 December 1964 to 11 November 1965.

NBC also purchased the series for broadcast in the United States from 4 January to 5 November 1965. It was replaced by Days of Our Lives.

== See also ==
- High Hopes (1978)
