= Yours for a Song =

- Genre: Game show
- Created by: Bob Russell
- Presented by: Bert Parks
- Narrated by: Johnny Gilbert
- Country of origin: United States

Production
- Producer: Bob Russell
- Camera setup: Multi-camera
- Running time: 22–24 minutes

Original release
- Network: ABC
- Release: November 14, 1961 – March 29, 1963

Yours for a Song is an American game show created by Bob Russell that aired on ABC from 1961 to 1963, with Bert Parks as the host and Johnny Gilbert as the announcer. The series, which filmed in New York City, aired in primetime from November 14, 1961, to September 18, 1962, and in daytime from December 4, 1961, to March 29, 1963. The following Monday, it was succeeded by a new program called General Hospital, which was the remaining soap opera aired on the network as of today.

== Gameplay ==
Two contestants alternated picking songs, then singing their lyrics, each with six words missing. For each correct word the contestant filled in, he/she won a cash award ($10 in daytime, $20 in nighttime); if the contestant was wrong, no money was awarded for that word and Parks would gently prod them in the direction of the word until it was correctly guessed. After the contestants finished their songs, Parks led the audience in a singalong.

Each contestant played two songs and the contestant who earned the most money became champion and returned for the next game. If a champion won five games in a row, he/she retired undefeated. Each episode featured two games.

== Songs ==
The songs used on the show came from the late 19th and early 20th centuries. These included "Daisy Bell", "Toot, Toot, Tootsie", and "Meet Me in St. Louis, Louis".

== Episode status ==
The series is believed to have been destroyed as per network practices of the era. Two 1963 episodes (January 29 and March 25) are held by the UCLA Film & Television Archive.

== Later use of the concept ==
The concept of filling in lyrics to a song as part of a game show was later revived on the late-2000s shows The Singing Bee and Don't Forget the Lyrics!
