= Say When!! =

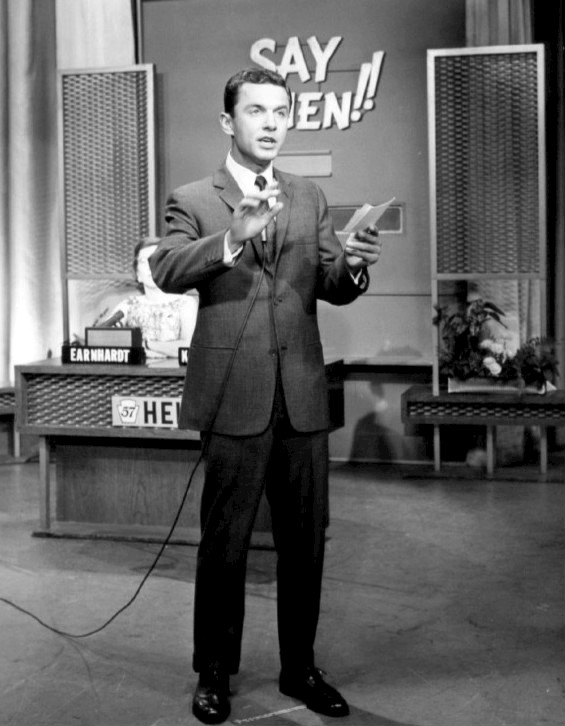
- The show with host Art James in 1963.
- Created by: Mark Goodson; Bill Todman
- Directed by: Dick Schneider, Don Bohl
- Presented by: Art James
- Starring: Ruth Halsey, Emily Banks, Gunilla Knutson, Carolyn Whit, Kristan Johnson, Elizabeth Ames
- Announcer: Wayne Howell
- Country of origin: United States

Production
- Producer: S. Robert Rowe
- Production locations: NBC Studios; New York, New York
- Running time: approx. 22-26 Minutes

Original release
- Network: NBC
- Release: 2 January 1961 – 26 March 1965

Say When!! is an American game show hosted by Art James that aired on NBC television from January 2, 1961, to March 26, 1965. The show was a Mark Goodson-Bill Todman production and James' only game show for them. Wayne Howell was the announcer, with occasional substitution by Roger Tuttle, Mel Brandt, and Fred Collins. The models alternatingly consisted of Ruth Halsey, Emily Banks, Gunilla Knutson, Carolyn White, Kristan Johnson, and Elizabeth Ames. Carmen Mastren was the show's music director.

The series aired live in black and white (switching to color in mid-1964) from NBC Studio 6A at 30 Rockefeller Plaza, New York.

== Game play ==
Two contestants, one a returning champion, competed. At the beginning of each game a dollar goal was revealed and four prizes were displayed. The contestants then took turns picking one prize at a time (when a prize was picked, another prize replaced it). Once picked, the dollar value of the prize was added to the contestant's total.

The object for the players was to get closer to the goal than their opponent without going over. Once either player came within $250 of the goal she/he could "say when" (freeze), forcing the other to continue playing until she/he either won the game by beating the frozen total, or losing the game by exceeding the goal.

One of the recurring prizes was the "Blank Check", which usually involved a grocery-related item. The contestant who chose it could select up to a certain amount of it times the product's individual cost. The individual price would then be revealed and multiplied, with its total then added to the contestant's score. (James' later game show Blank Check was not actually based on this "prize", but on adding digits to a four-digit cash prize.)

A best-of-three match was played to determine the champion, with players keeping all prizes won outright.

== "Peter Pan" incident ==
During one episode following the switch to color, James was doing a live commercial for Peter Pan peanut butter. The spot went normally until, as he had done several times during rehearsals for the spot, he dropped a table knife into the glass jar as he held it up; on this instance, however, the bottom of the jar broke and the knife fell out of the bottom. James continued the spot to laughter from the audience, which held as the bottom part of the jar (now a fully visible circle) came "unglued" from the peanut butter. "It's great peanut butter," James said. "The jar is something else". He later said, "My mother told me there'd be days like this".

== Episode status ==
Due to wiping, a run-through taped in December 1960 and an episode from 1961 are the only regular episodes in existence. The latter show was discovered in 2014 and uploaded to YouTube. In the 1960 run-through, the format was somewhat different: two games were played, and the winners of those games competed head-to-head; the goal in each game was $2,000. Both episodes were kept using the Kinescope format. A third episode, the January 6th, 1961 episode, was discovered and uploaded to YouTube in July 2023.

The Peter Pan incident also exists, as a clip running just under two minutes (the episode of origin is believed to have been destroyed). A portion of this footage was used on both NBC's Most Outrageous Game Show Moments and VH1's Game Show Moments Gone Bananas; the full version is available for viewing on YouTube.

Buzzr aired an early episode of the program during its 5th annual "Lostnfun" marathon on September 27, 2020.

== Australian version ==
The show ran in Australia from 1962 to 1964 on Nine Network, hosted by Jimmy Hannan and produced by Reg Grundy. It was later revived as Spending Spree from 1971 to 1976 on Nine, which was also hosted by Hannan and produced by Grundy. The archival status of the Australian versions is unknown.
