= Seven Keys (game show) =

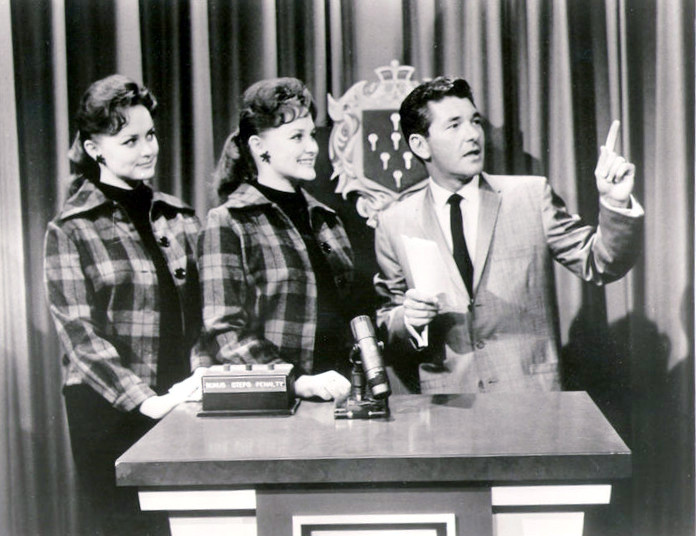
- Host Jack Narz with twin contestants.
- Genre: Game Show
- Created by: Carl Jampel
- Presented by: Jack Narz
- Announcer: Jack Powers
- Country of origin: United States

Production
- Running time: 30 minutes

Original release
- Network: KTLA (1960–1961, 1964–1965); ABC (1961–1964)
- Release: September 12, 1960 – January 15, 1965

Seven Keys is an American game show hosted by Jack Narz and based on Snakes and Ladders. Seven Keys aired from September 12, 1960, to January 15, 1965; initially on Los Angeles' KTLA and then on ABC before ending on KTLA.

The first KTLA series was one of the few non-syndicated television game shows to air daily in nighttime. The ABC version aired in daytime.

== Game play ==
The board consisted of a 70-space path and three spinning dials marked "Steps," "Bonus," and "Penalty," each of which could display a value from 1 to 10 and was controlled by a separate button. Each dial was only illuminated when the button to stop it was pressed, revealing the number on which it had stopped. A solo contestant attempted to travel the entire length of the path within 15 turns. On each turn, they stopped the "Steps" dial and advanced the number of spaces shown.

Spaces along the path could be one of the following types, and were illuminated only when the contestant landed on them.

- Bonus: The contestant stopped the "Bonus" dial and advanced the number of spaces shown.
- Penalty: The contestant stopped the "Penalty" dial and backed up the number of spaces shown.
- Safe: The contestant immediately took their next turn.
- Question: The contestant answered a question. A correct response allowed them to play from that space on their next turn, while a miss forced them to back up to the last Safe space they had passed. If the contestant landed on a previously answered question, it was counted as a free move.

Each turn ended when the contestant either answered a question correctly, landed on a Safe space while moving in either direction, or landed on a space for a question they had already answered.

All question spaces on the board were of the same type or category, which changed from one game to the next. Examples of categories included filling in the middle initial of a famous person's name; stating whether a given animal lived on land, in air, or in the sea; and naming the missing celebrity in a pair.

The final space on the path was marked "Keys." If the contestant spun a number on the "Steps" or "Bonus" dial that was greater than or equal to the number of steps needed to reach it, they won the game and earned the right to choose one key from a group of seven. Each key corresponded to a different prize, one of which was a large package personalized to match the contestant's interests, and the prizes (or pictures of them) were behind glass doors secured with padlocks. The contestant had to make a choice to play again in the hope of earning more keys; or to stop, choose the appropriate number of keys, and win whatever prizes they unlocked.

Contestants left the show after deciding to stop, earning all seven keys and winning every available prize, or failing to complete the path within 15 turns. In this last case, they forfeited all their keys and received only a consolation prize.

=== Home-viewer game ===
Once per episode, home viewers were given a chance to play for seven different prizes, six small ones and a "prize wonderland" that consisted of a prize package, a fur stole, and a cash bonus. Each prize corresponded to one of seven keys as in the main game. Viewers sent in postcards with their name, address, and the number of the key they wanted to use (1 through 7). Any postcard without all three of these elements was discarded, and another one was drawn to replace it. The host tried the viewer's chosen key on the prize wonderland first, and the viewer won it if he was able to open its lock. If not, he tried the key on the other prizes until he found the one it unlocked, and the viewer won that prize.

Two different formats were used during the broadcast run of the series. In one format, the cash bonus was $1,000, and the host kept drawing one card at a time and awarding prizes until a viewer won the prize wonderland. In the other, the bonus was $500 and the host only drew one card; if the viewer did not win the prize wonderland, he demonstrated the correct key by using it to open that lock.

== Broadcast History ==
=== KTLA (1960–1961) ===
Seven Keys originally aired locally in Los Angeles on KTLA Channel 5 (now an affiliate of The CW) from September 12, 1960, to April 28, 1961. The show proved to be popular, and caught the attention of ABC.

=== ABC (1961–1964) ===
On April 3, 1961, the series began airing on ABC at 2:30 PM Eastern (1:30 Central), replacing the short-lived Road to Reality. Despite facing Art Linkletter's mega-popular House Party on CBS and local programming on NBC (which had not programmed at 2:30 since August 1959, following the disastrous Court of Human Relations), the two shows divided the audience over the next eighteen months.

On October 1, 1962 Keys was struck a large blow when NBC began a new 55-minute series at 2:00 PM (followed by a five-minute newscast) – The Merv Griffin Show. CBS and Linkletter would have the last laugh – Griffin ended on March 29, 1963, and Keys was shifted away to a morning slot on April 1. ABC ceased programming at 2:30/1:30 for five months.

Keys went to 11:30 AM (10:30 Central/Pacific), replacing the Bert Parks game Yours for a Song. Now facing the five-year-old Concentration on NBC and daytime repeats of The Millionaire on CBS, Keys managed to cease the Millionaire repeats on August 30 and send Concentration packing to 11:00/10:00 on September 6. Narz would host the syndicated version of Concentration from 1973 to 1978.

While CBS stopped programming at 11:30/10:30 for nearly a year, NBC introduced its new Ed McMahon-hosted game Missing Links in the slot. Within the next three months, the new word-association game from Goodson-Todman wore down Keys in the ratings.

On December 30, 1963 Keys was moved one last time to 12:00 noon (11:00 AM Central). The show was now up against the long-running soap Love of Life on CBS and the popular game Your First Impression on NBC, and was beaten soundly in the ratings until it finally admitted defeat on March 27, 1964.

=== KTLA (1964–1965) ===
Having spent a turbulent three years on the national schedule, Keys returned to KTLA on April 6. After another nine months, the series took its last bow on January 15, 1965.

== Episode status ==
Despite running for five seasons, the series is believed to be destroyed. Although the status of the KTLA versions remain unknown, the ABC tapes are believed to have been either destroyed or reused as per network practices at the time.

Only three episodes are known to exist among collectors – Episode #9 of the original KTLA version (September 22, 1960), an ABC episode from July 12, 1962, and a second episode from KTLA. A complete ABC episode from May 24, 1963, was discovered on audio tape in March 2010.

The UCLA Film and Television Archive holds two episodes along with a clip from a KTLA blooper reel (described as "a box is stuck from the game show Seven Keys").
