= The Magic Land of Allakazam =

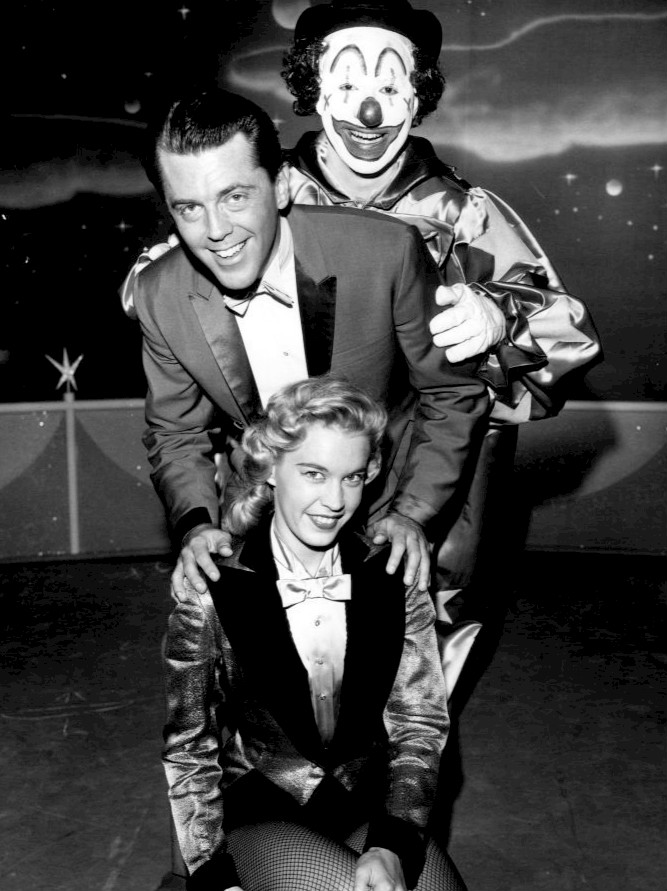
- Cast at the show premiere in October 1960
- Created by: Mark Wilson
- Starring: Mark Wilson; Nani Darnell; Bev Bergeron
- Country of origin: United States
- Original language: English
- No. of episodes: 98

Production
- Running time: 30 minutes

Original release
- Network: CBS (1960-1962), ABC (1962-1964)
- Release: 1 October 1960 – 26 December 1964

The Magic Land of Allakazam was a series of network television shows starring American magician Mark Wilson. It ran from 1960 to 1964 and is credited with establishing the credibility of magic as a television entertainment.

== History ==
The origins of the series were in a locally broadcast show that Wilson arranged in Dallas, Texas, in 1955. That grew into other shows in Houston and San Antonio. With the introduction of videotape and the help of Alan Wakeling, Wilson created The Magic World of Allakazam as the first magic show to be videotaped and nationally syndicated. It debuted on 1 October 1960 on CBS and aired every Saturday morning on that network for two years. The shows were in black and white and were sponsored by Kellogg's. They followed a formula that Wilson devised and which he believed was essential for the success of magic on television—there should be a live audience, there should not be a cut from one view to another during a trick, and viewers should know that they were seeing exactly what the studio audience saw.

Wilson was assisted by his wife, Nani Darnell, and their young son, Mike. They were joined by Bev Bergeron, who played the character Rebo the Clown. Other cameo appearances by Bob Towner, Robert Fenton, and Chuck Burns played occasional characters on the show. Puppet stories set in the Land of Allakazam involved the King (played by Towner) and his subject Perriwinkle (played by Barnes), opposed by the wicked magician Evilo (also played by Towner). In its first year of broadcast, cartoon shorts from The Huckleberry Hound Show would be interspersed throughout the show, often times with Mark interacting with the animated characters when introducing them—the cartoons were dropped for the second season.

In 1962, the show moved to ABC without missing a week on air. In 1965, the series left ABC and was internationally syndicated. The series was one of the top shows in the Nielsen ratings for Saturday mornings. It has been cited by a number of famous magicians as an early inspiration.

== Home media ==
Wilson has released the first 24 shows on DVD in six volumes, as well as the 1970s Magic Circus episodes.
