= Mighty Mouse Playhouse =

American Saturday morning TV series (1955–1967)

- Voices of: Tom Morrison; Ken Schoen; Betty Jaynes
- Country of origin: United States

Production
- Running time: 30 minutes
- Production company: Terrytoons

Original release
- Network: CBS
- Release: December 10, 1955 – September 2, 1967

Mighty Mouse Playhouse is an American Saturday morning television anthology series featuring animated short films starring Mighty Mouse. The series aired on CBS from 1955 to 1967. The series was credited with both popularizing the Mighty Mouse character in popular culture far beyond what the original film shorts had done and putting Saturday morning cartoons on the map.

== Background ==
Mighty Mouse was not extraordinarily popular in theatrical animation, but was still Terrytoons' most popular character. What made him a cultural icon was television. Most of the short film studios, both live-action and animated, were in decline by the 1950s, pressured both by the loss of film audiences to television as well as the increased popularity (and financial benefits) of low-budget, stylized, limited animation. Most of the studios cashed out of the short-film production business and began licensing or selling their back catalogs to television. Paul Terry went as far as to sell the entire Terrytoon company to CBS in 1955.

The network began running Mighty Mouse Playhouse in December 1955. It remained on the air for nearly twelve years (and featured The Mighty Heroes during the final season). Mighty Mouse cartoons became a staple of children's television programming for a period of over thirty years, from the 1950s through the 1980s.

== End of the Mighty Mouse film series ==
Terrytoons, under CBS ownership, produced only three further Mighty Mouse theatrical cartoons in the 1959–1961 time frame. This was in marked contrast to other animated cartoon lines such as Looney Tunes, Tom & Jerry and Woody Woodpecker, all of which continued to produce new film shorts for nearly a decade after licensing their library to television. The company evidently believed that the existing library of shorts was enough to keep youngsters tuning into CBS every Saturday morning; the library consisted of 80 shorts, enough for 26 half-hour episodes.

== Theme song ==
Some early vinyls credit the original 1955 Mighty Mouse Playhouse theme song to The Terrytooners, Mitch Miller and Orchestra, but recent publishing has generally credited The Sandpipers.

== Cast ==
- Tom Morrison as voice of Mighty Mouse (in TV program wraparounds and shorts filmed after 1955), Gandy Goose
- Ken Schoen as Oil Can Harry
- Betty Jaynes as Pearl Pureheart (1950s)
