= Missing Links (game show) =

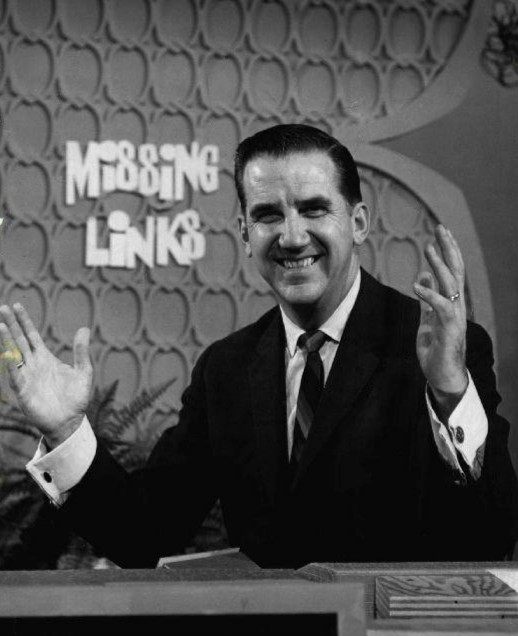
- Host Ed McMahon.
- Created by: Mark Goodson; Bill Todman
- Presented by: Ed McMahon (NBC); Dick Clark (ABC)
- Announcer: Johnny Olson
- Country of origin: United States
- No. of episodes: NBC: 135

Production
- Running time: 30 Minutes

Original release
- Network: NBC
- Release: September 9, 1963 – March 27, 1964
- Network: ABC
- Release: March 30 – December 25, 1964

Missing Links is a Goodson-Todman game show hosted by Ed McMahon which originally ran on NBC from September 9, 1963, to March 27, 1964, then moved to ABC for its final nine months, with Dick Clark (who later hosted TV's Bloopers & Practical Jokes with McMahon) becoming the new host.

This was Clark's only Goodson-Todman game show as well as the only game show he hosted where he did not do his salute sign off "For now Dick Clark, so long!"

== Game play ==
A panel of three celebrities faced a studio contestant who came in with an unusual story. He/she read the story to the panel. When he/she came to a sentence with a blank or blanks at the end or near the end, each panelist tried to guess the missing word or words. A correct answer from one celebrity won $50 for the contestant (unlike most panel shows using this type of format), but an incorrect answer passed the turn to the next celebrity. If all three missed, the host gave the starting letter or letters of the answer and the round continued as before, with a correct guess earning only $25.

Three guests played each day, with the final guest being a celebrity.

On the August 21, 1963, pilot, the guest predicted whether each word would be guessed or not. If the guest predicted that the word would be guessed, he or she earned $10 for each of six chances remaining. Predicting the word would not be guessed earned $10 for each wrong guess. On the sixth and final part of the story, each panelist took only one guess with the first letter revealed, and a correct prediction earned $25 per incorrect guess or chance remaining, depending on the guest's prediction.

== Broadcast history ==
Missing Links debuted on September 9, 1963 at 11:30 AM Eastern (10:30, Central), replacing The Price Is Right in a scheduling shuffle with Concentration (which took Price's slot at 11:00/10:00) against Seven Keys on ABC and reruns of Pete and Gladys on CBS. On December 30, ABC replaced Keys with Dick Clark's first foray into game-show hosting, The Object Is, which was cancelled after thirteen weeks.

On March 30, 1964, Missing Links moved to ABC to replace the cancelled The Object Is with Clark replacing McMahon as host. Its place on NBC's schedule was taken by Jeopardy! which quickly grew in popularity. Shortly after this, CBS began counterprogramming Missing Links with reruns of The Real McCoys and the ratings for the game show slid even further. ABC cancelled Missing Links almost nine months later, and the show came to an end on December 25, 1964.

== Episode status ==
All episodes except for three are believed to have been destroyed as per network policies of the era.

As part of Buzzr's Lost and Found week, the pilot was aired on September 13, 2017. The pilot was one of five episodes that were videotaped on August 21, 1963, approximately three weeks before the episodes were telecast on NBC's daytime schedule. The three panelists for that first week were Milt Kamen, Phyllis Newman and Chester Morris. Toward the end of the pilot, host Ed McMahon can be heard summarizing the unusual story of contestant Gloria Steinem, then a magazine writer and editor who was known for having gone undercover as a Playboy Bunny at a Playboy Club. McMahon says she will appear as a contestant on the next day's episode. Steinem's episode, which was another of the five that were videotaped on August 21, got wiped.

A 1964 episode exists with host Dick Clark and panelists Sam Levenson, Kaye Ballard and Joel Grey. An episode dated December 24, 1964 is held by the UCLA Film and Television Archive, and the Library Of Congress. Arlene Francis is one of the three panelists on this episode. Clark is the host. All other episodes were lost as a result of the wiping of reel-to-reel videotapes before the videocassette was invented.
