= Get the Message (game show) =

American television game show

- Created by: Mark Goodson; Bill Todman
- Developed by: Jack Farren
- Presented by: Frank Buxton; Robert Q. Lewis
- Announcer: Chet Gould; Johnny Olson
- Country of origin: United States

Production
- Executive producer: Robert Noah
- Production locations: Elysee Theater, New York
- Running time: 30 Minutes

Original release
- Network: ABC
- Release: March 30 – December 25, 1964

Get the Message is a television game show produced by Mark Goodson and Bill Todman which aired on ABC's daytime schedule for nine months in 1964.

Frank Buxton was the original host, but he was replaced by Robert Q. Lewis on September 28. The announcers were Chet Gould and Johnny Olson.

== Main game ==
Two teams of three people—men versus women—competed, each featuring one contestant and two celebrities. On each turn, the celebrities were shown a message (e.g., person, place, thing, common phrase, etc.) on the screens in front of them. All four celebrities wrote down a one-word clue on index cards without any discussion among them. Both celebrities on the team playing first showed and read their clues to their teammate, who then attempted to guess the message. If incorrect, play passed to the opposing team who followed the same process. If the opposing contestant failed to guess the message, one more round of clue-writing and reading took place. The message was discarded if neither team guessed correctly. Correct answers were worth one point, and the first team to reach three points won the game and a $100 prize.

Originally contestants from both teams played only one game and did not return. Later, all players competed for the entire half-hour.

== Bonus round ==
The winning team in each game played the "turnabout game" bonus round. The contestant was shown a message and orally gave one-word clues to each celebrity in turn. The celebrity responded by attempting to guess the message, and if correct, the contestant won $100. Each additional word the contestant provided decreased the bonus amount for that message, from $100 to $50, $25, and finally $10. The contestant attempted to convey three messages for a top prize of $300. If the player at any time gave the actual message or part of the message the value decreased to the lowest amount.

The bonus round was later changed and renamed the "open game". The celebrities were shown a message and gave their clues verbally. The contestant then had one guess to identify the phrase. Three messages were played, and each correctly guessed won the contestant another $50 for a maximum of payoff of $150.

== Board Game ==
Despite its short-lived run, Milton Bradley issued a board game adaptation of Get the Message in 1964.

== Unsold Pilot ==
In 1986, an unsold pilot for a remake of Get the Message called Oddball hosted by Jamie Farr was made for NBC. In this version it consisted of eight celebrities (i.e. four men and four women) and one contestant.

== Episode status ==
Get the Message is believed to be wiped as per network practices at the time. Three episodes are held by the UCLA Film and Television Archive. In 2020, game show rerun channel Buzzr posted a clip of an episode to YouTube, while promoting a full episode to air in an upcoming "Lost and Found" marathon.
