= Ralph Edwards Productions =

American television production company

- Type: Private
- Industry: Television production
- Founded: 1940; 86 years ago
- Founder: Ralph Edwards
- Headquarters: Hollywood, California
- Website: ralphedwards.com

Ralph Edwards Productions is an independent television and radio production company that was originally founded in 1940 by Ralph Edwards. It is notable for a joint venture with Stu Billett, called Ralph Edwards/Stu Billett Productions. Its most notable work included the radio and television game show Truth or Consequences, as well as This is Your Life, Name That Tune, The Cross-Wits and The People's Court. The company was most notable for technology firsts in television through the Truth or Consequences television series.

== History ==
Ralph Edwards begin in the industry as a radio announcer. By 1940, its radio announcing days was shifted, so he can make a vanity project on its own, called Truth or Consequences, which was a game show. It was first premiered on CBS radio in 1940, then it was moved to NBC radio later that year. In 1941, the company hit its turning point when its flagship Trurh or Consequences received a one-off television broadcast via WNBT on its first day of broadcasting.

In 1945, the program moved to Hollywood, hence Ralph Edwards became the first game show producer to move from New York City to Hollywood, becoming the earliest one to do so. The company expanded in 1948 to launch its own project This is Your Life, which became another smash hit and astonishing radio success.

In 1950, the company made its biggest turning point into television when Truth or Consequences, the popular NBC radio program made its move to CBS, and launched its television counterpart. Instead of making it live, the producers arranged it to have been on 35mm film under the sponsorship of Phillip Morris, which was a technology first for the company.

In 1956, Bob Barker made its television debut by being hired by Edwards to be the host of the television show Truth or Consequences. Also that year, the company expanded to daytime with another hit game show franchise, It Could Be You, for NBC, hosted by Bill Leyden. In 1957, the company hit another technology first when Truth or Consequences, starring Bob Barker, became the first program to be recorded on a prerecorded videotape.

In 1962, the company hit its only foray outside of unscripted programming with its television show, Wide Country, a joint venture between Ralph Edwards Productions and Revue Studios for NBC. But it did not last long and it was cancelled in 1963. In 1965, NBC decided to end its run of the televised version of Truth or Consequences, and in 1966, came another technology first, when Truth or Consequences became the first successful daily game show in first-run syndication (as opposed to reruns) to not air on a network. The company expanded in 1967 to launch a television variety show starring Woody Woodbury.

In 1974, the company expanded by obtaining the rights to the classic television series Name That Tune, and produced it as a successful first-run syndicated series for Sandy Frank, as well as two daytime versions of the franchise for NBC. The following year, the company saw another hit syndicated series, The Cross-Wits, for Metromedia Producers Corporation, hosted by Jack Clark and became another smash.

In 1980, Edwards met producer Stu Billett, a former executive of Stefan Hatos-Monty Hall Productions, and developed a television pilot Fantasies Fullfilled for Air Time International, but due to Air Time's troubles, the team moved on to develop another successful syndicated hit The People's Court, for Telepictures Corporation, and became another ratings success.

The team later formed a joint venture Ralph Edwards-Stu Billett Productions (EB, or Edwards-Billett Prooductions) to develop TV programming. In 1986, the duo wanted to expand it beyond game and court shows and hired Lorimar-Telepictures veteran Jay Feldman to serve as senior vice president, in order to go for specials and made-for-television features.

During the hiatus of The People's Court, the team created the game show Bzzz!, before reviving The People's Court in 1997 in an hour-long format. In 1997, the company, through the Ralph Edwards Films division, made its direct-to-video animated feature, Annabelle's Wish, made for Hallmark Home Entertainment, and on Fox.

== Productions ==
=== Radio ===
Title	Years	Networks
Truth or Consequences	1940-1957	CBS; NBC
This is Your Life	1948-1950	CBS; NBC
The Ralph Edwards Radio Show	1951-1952	NBC

=== Television ===
Title	Years	Networks	Notes
Truth or Consequences	1941; 1950-1951; 1954-1965; 1966-1975; 1977-1978; 1987-1988	WNBT; CBS; NBC; Syndication	One-off special in 1941; Co-production with Wolper Television Sales (1966–1968), Metromedia Producers Corporation (1968–1975, 1977–1978), Stu Billett Productions (1987–1988), Chris Bearde Productions (1987–1988) and Lorimar-Telepictures (1987–1988)
This is Your Life	1952-1961; 1971-1973; 1981; 1983-1984; 1987; 1993	NBC; Syndication	Co-production with Western Video Industries (1971–1973) and Andrews & Associates (1983–1984)
Place the Face	1953-1955	CBS	
Funny Boners	1954-1955	NBC	
It Could Be You	1956-1961	NBC	
About Faces	1960-1961	ABC	
Who in the World	1962	CBS	
Wide Country	1962-1963	NBC	co-production with Revue Studios
The Woody Woodbury Show	1967-1968	Syndication	co-production with Wolper Television Sales
Let's Face It	1967-1968	WBKB-TV	
Name That Tune	1974-1981	NBC; Syndication	co-production with Sandy Frank Film Syndication/Station Syndication
The Cross-Wits	1975-1980	Syndication	co-production with Metromedia Producers Corporation
Knockout	1977-1978	NBC	
The People's Court	1981-1993; 1997-2023	Syndication	co-production with Stu Billett Productions, Telepictures Corporation (1981–1986), Lorimar-Telepictures (1986–1989) and Warner Bros. Domestic Television Distribution (1989–1993, 1997–2023)
So You Think You've Got Troubles?!	1982-1983	Syndication	co-production with Stu Billett Productions and Telepictures Corporation
Superior Court	1986-1989	Syndication	co-production with Stu Billett Productions and Lorimar-Telepictures
Family Medical Center	1988-1989	Syndication	co-production with Stu Billett Productions and Lorimar-Telepictures
Love Stories	1991-1992	Syndication	co-production with Stu Billett Productions, Telepictures Productions and Warner Bros. Domestic Television Distribution
Bzzz!	1996-1997	Syndication	co-production with Stu Billett Productions and Tribune Entertainment

=== Film ===
Title	Years	Distributor	Notes
Annabelle's Wish	1997	Hallmark Home Entertainment	as Raph Edwards Films
