= This Is Your Life (radio program) =

American radio human-interest program (1948–1950)

This Is Your Life is an American human-interest radio program that was broadcast on NBC from November 9, 1948, to May 3, 1950, and on CBS from May 9, 1950, to May 30, 1950.

== Background ==
Events in two episodes of the radio program Truth or Consequences prompted that show's host, Ralph Edwards, to create This Is Your Life. The first episode centered around a wounded veteran in a military hospital in Hawaii. A telephone connection to the man's hometown enabled his family and friends to try to re-create a typical Saturday night on Main Street there. That episode's popularity led to another in which a paraplegic was reunited on stage with "his family, teachers, old friends, and even the doctor who had delivered him". Edwards felt that stories of real people's lives could provide more human interest, drama, and humor than any fictional scripts that writers might create. That feeling was the basis for his developing This Is Your Life.

== Overview ==
This Is Your Life introduced what NBC described as an "original and untried type of radio entertainment", presenting a living American's life story with the help of people from his or her past. Edwards was the host. Two key elements to each episode were finding people who would provide information about the guest and maintaining secrecy so that the guest would be surprised. "Elaborate deceptions" were created so that the guest would be present, ostensibly for some other purpose, when Edwards revealed the truth.

Subjects of the biographies ranged from celebrities to average citizens. In one episode, Edwards surprised a man who had been operating an apartment building's elevator for 17 years. Edwards entered the elevator on the third floor, telling the operator that each floor of the building would reveal an aspect of the man's life. As the elevator stopped at each floor, people who entered included the operator's siblings, his wife, his father, a group of close friends, and a nurse who cared for him after his tonsillectomy in 1921. One result of the variety of subjects featured on the program was that each listener could imagine his or her own life being depicted in such a way. Celebrities featured on the program included Walter A. Gordon, Grantland Rice, Mary McLeod Bethune, Jeanette MacDonald, Fifi D'Orsay, and Lowell Thomas.

Prizes (called the subject's "Philip Morris future") varied by subjects. They included a 6 1/2 pound bar of silver (for a subject who made jewelry), two frozen chickens every Sunday for a year (for a woman who liked chicken dinners), a refrigerator, a gas range, a new car, a television,a radio-phonograph, a vacation, and a set of silverware.

== Production ==
=== Personnel and schedule ===
Al Paschal was the producer, and Axel Gruenberg was the director. Jim Chadwick was the researcher. Art Ballinger was the announcer, and Alexander László led the orchestra. Priced at $10,000 per week, in 1948-49 the program was heard on Tuesdays at 8 p.m. Eastern Time, replacing Mel Tormé's show. In 1949-50, it was on Wednesdays at 8 p.m. E. T. on NBC. The change from Tuesdays to Wednesdays occurred so that the show would not have to compete with Milton Berle's television program. The trade publication Billboard reported that the desire to avoid competing with Texaco Star Theater acknowledged that the sponsor, Philip Morris, "is conceding that This Is Your Life is no match for Berle's tele [sic] popularity". At the end of that first season, the program was thought to be facing cancellation because of its rating.

The CBS episodes were on Tuesdays at 9:30 p.m. E. T.

=== Preparation ===
Selection of subjects began with Edwards deciding what type of person he wanted to honor. Over several weeks the staff reviewed letters, newspaper clippings, and other files. Then they conferred with Edwards, who usually had the final decision in selecting a specific individual. Following that choice, the staff began conducting research on the person's life. Typically a two-week span included more than 100 long-distance telephone calls to solicit background information and arrange for appearances of surprise guests, about 20 of whom typically appeared on the broadcast. The show's staff sometimes enlisted local people, such as journalists, to conduct interviews and gather documentation in preparation for an episode.

=== Difficulties ===
Edwards said that the most difficult aspect of the program was editing and condensing a person's life events to fit into approximately 25 minutes of air time. Beyond that, weather sometimes presented challenges in getting people from the subject's past to the studio. In one case a blizzard prevented two people who were important to the story from being present, causing Edwards to rewrite the entire script in the 30 minutes before the show began.

== Critical response ==
Jack Gould's review in The New York Times expressed concern over the invasion of subjects' privacy on This Is Your Life. Gould cited an episode featuring an elderly widower, describing the broadcast as "a carefully staged orgy of embarrassing sentimentality". He mentioned on-the-air appearances by the man's children and other relatives and Edwards's allusion to the death of the man's wife and summarized, "The whole incident was as inexcusable as it was needless. Personal human emotions should be exempt from such reckless abuse."

David Westheimer, writing in the Houston Post, acknowledged that "moments of false sentimentality or forced wit" sometimes occurred. Even so, he said, "The This Is Your Life treatment gives even the most ordinary life a touch of drama ... the show nearly always offers a full share of real pathos, excitement and humor." He added that Edwards sometimes tended to be overenthusiastic, but he was "exceedingly good at maintaining a smooth, fast pace".

John Crosby wrote in his syndicated column, "The highest compliment I can pay This Is Your Life is that it's an even greater invasion of privacy than Candid Microphone, something I didn't believe was possible." Crosby compared an episode about a paraplegic war veteran to the exposure of a raw nerve.

In a review in The Port Huron Times Herald, Al Haughner wrote that much could be said for and against This Is Your Life, but the program "packs a little too much hokum". Haughner's review complimented the research and documentation behind each episode. He added, however, that Edwards "can turn on and off his 'tenderness' voice with trigger-like rapidity", leading Haughner to "wonder if there isn't more hokum to the show than meets the eye and ear".

A review in Billboard said, "Listening to the new Philip Morris show, This Is Your Life, is an acutely embarrassing experience." The review noted the ill-at-ease feeling conveyed by the guest on the episode reviewed and added, "The listener begins to feel like an intruder." A subsequent review in Billboard almost a year later said that the program "bears more than a passing resemblance to a professional peep show." The reviewer commended the thoroughness of the research done in preparation for the episode.

A review of the premiere episode in the trade publication Variety called the show's concept "a highly original idea" but went on to note difficulties that needed to be overcome. The review said that the "necessarily amateurish talent involved" hampered the effectiveness of the broadcasts. It pointed out the ineffective communication of the reticent guest's reactions as relatives and friends appeared. Despite such shortcomings, the review said, "Edwards handled the show well, especially in the early parts when it sagged badly."

== Adaptation ==
After two successful seasons on radio, Edwards began a television version of This Is Your Life on NBC. That series ran from October 1, 1952, to September 3, 1961.
