= Annabelle's Wish =

1997 film

- DVD cover
- Directed by: Roy Wilson
- Written by: Jane Baer; John Bettis; Ken Blackwell; John Couch; Gary Edwards; Bruce Faulk; Kathy Grover; Riki Hobin; Jay Johnson; Jaime Barton Klein; George Larrimore; John Lewis; Barbara Dunn-Leonard; Sheryl Scarborough
- Based on: "Clarabell the Christmas Cow" by Dan Henderson
- Produced by: Barbara Dunn-Leonard
- Starring: Kath Soucie; Randy Travis; Cloris Leachman; Jerry Van Dyke; Jim Varney; Rue McClanahan
- Edited by: Tom Gleason; Clay Iverson; Terry Moore
- Music by: Steve Dorff
- Production company: Ralph Edwards Productions
- Distributed by: Ralph Edwards Productions
- Release date: October 21, 1997
- Running time: 54 minutes
- Country: United States
- Language: English

Annabelle's Wish is a 1997 American direct-to-video animated Christmas film that revolves around a young calf who aspires to fly like one of Santa Claus's reindeer, while forming a friendship with Billy, a young boy who cannot talk. Narrated by American country singer Randy Travis, it also stars voice actress Kath Soucie as the voice of Annabelle and also features the voices of Jerry Van Dyke, Jim Varney and Clancy Brown. Ralph Edwards Films released the film to video on October 21, 1997, followed by a television broadcast later that year on Fox.

== Plot ==
Annabelle, a calf, is born on Christmas Eve on the farm of Charlie Baker in the rural farming community of Twobridge, Tennessee. Each Christmas, Santa Claus gives the animals a speaking voice for just one day; upon meeting him, Annabelle becomes fascinated with his reindeer and their ability to fly, and wishes to fly herself. Annabelle is granted as a gift to Charlie's grandson, Billy.

Some time prior, a fire in the barn killed both of Billy's parents and left Billy in Charlie's custody, unable to talk and terrified of the barn. Annabelle befriends Billy and helps him overcome his fear. In a larger city, Agnes, Billy's mean aunt, is trying to celebrate the "perfect Christmas" but realizes that it would not be so without a child; she begins discussing with her attorney about how to gain custody of Billy, even though she had rejected custody of him after the barn fire. She visits the farm, which she loathes, to warn Charlie of her plans; Billy makes it clear he has no interest in living with Agnes.

Meanwhile, Annabelle accidentally reveals her ability to speak; since Billy himself cannot speak, their secret is safe. They go sledding with Billy's best friend Emily and they accidentally crash into the fence of Gus Holder, Charlie's grouchy neighbor. Knowing that Charlie cannot pay for the damages to the fence, Gus takes Annabelle until Charlie can raise the money, which he does by selling an old music box that belonged to Billy's mother and his late daughter, Sarah.

Billy, Emily and Annabelle spend the next year inseparable from each other. As winter approaches, the sheriff visits Gus and remarks that Charlie had to sell his daughter's music box to an antique dealer in town in order to pay for both the damages to his fence and to get Annabelle back, and that since the death of Gus's wife, he had descended into a miserly scrooge whose misanthropy was beginning to reflect in his sons' misbehavior (this references a fight between the sons and Annabelle that was cut from the television version).

As the next Christmas Eve arrives, Agnes' attorney secures a court order granting her custody of Billy as long as he remains mute, and Agnes arrives on the farm to claim him. The animals stall for time by dragging her car into a trough, and Charlie states that no tow truck will be available until the next morning, forcing her to stay the night. That night, as Santa Claus arrives on the farm, Annabelle asks to redeem a wish and whispers it into Santa's ear.

The next morning, Billy opens a present, but finds nothing but dust—upon covering him, he casually mentions the box was empty, to his and Charlie's delight. Because Billy can speak, the court order expires. He goes to the farm to talk to Annabelle, but learns that Annabelle had given up her voice in exchange for Santa granting her wish to allow Billy to speak. The Holders visit and apologize for their behavior. Gus reveals that he bought the music box from the antique shop and gives it to Charlie; Gus and Agnes are instantly smitten and decide to spend the holiday (and beyond) together—in the company of Gus's sons, this completes Agnes's perfect Christmas.

As adults, Billy (who is revealed to be the narrator) and Emily marry and inherit the farm; and Annabelle lives to old age. As Annabelle is dying, Santa Claus visits to grant a wish of Billy's. He transforms Annabelle into a reindeer, which restores her youth, gives her the ability to fly, and restores her capability of speech. Annabelle and Billy bid farewells as Annabelle flies off into the night with Santa.

== Cast ==
- Kath Soucie as Annabelle
- Hari Oziol as Young Billy
  - Randy Travis as the Narrator (US)/Adult Billy
    - David Holt as the Narrator (UK)
- Jerry Van Dyke as Grandpa Charles "Charlie" Baker
- Cloris Leachman as Aunt Agnes
- Jim Varney as Gus Holder
- Charlie Cronin as Bucky Holder
- James Lafferty as Buster Holder
- Aria Curzon as Young Emily
  - Beth Nielsen Chapman as Adult Emily
- Kay E. Kuter as Santa Claus
- Jennifer Darling as Star
- Rue McClanahan as Scarlett
- Jerry Houser as Slim
- Steve Mackall as Owliver
- Brian Cummings as Brewster
- Mary Kay Bergman and Tress MacNeille as the hens
- Jay Johnson as Ears
- Clancy Brown as the town sheriff and the lawyer
- Stu Rosen as Doc Taylor
- Alison Krauss and Frank Welker provided additional voices.

== Production ==
The film is based on the book "Clarabell the Christmas Cow" by Dan Henderson, first published in 1976.

Annabelle (Kath Soucie)’s decision not to ask her wish to fly, but instead giving up her talking voice for Billy (Hari Oziol) and not expecting anything in return gives the title of Annabelle’s Wish a double meaning.

== Music ==
The film's score was by Steve Dorff, who also wrote the film's songs with John Bettis and Randy Travis. The songs were performed by Randy Travis, Alison Krauss, Beth Nielsen Chapman, Dolly Parton, Kevin Sharp and Nanci Griffith.

== Release ==
Annabelle's Wish was released by Ralph Edwards Productions on October 21, 1997 and was the first film created by Ralph Edwards Films to be released. The film later aired on Fox on November 30, 1997.

== Reception and legacy ==
The special received mixed reviews from critics. Lynne Heffley of the Los Angeles Times praised David Holt's narration and Travis' score and songs, and the film's "gentle message of selfless love". Andrea Higbie of The New York Times referred to the character of Agnes (Cloris Leachman) as the film's version of Cruella de Vil, and wrote that the film would appeal to young viewers but that "its narcissistic dysfunction angle ("If Aunt Agnes doesn't love Billy, why does she want to take him away from Grandpa?") will leave them wishing for a villainess who simply has fur coats on her mind," in reference to de Vil. Reviewing the DVD release, myReviewer.com noted it is a "undemanding tale. There are gaping holes in the plot only unnoticed by the very young and the characters are bland, the animation is dull but the songs are pleasant enough. What I`m trying to say is it may keep young children pacified whilst waiting for Christmas Eve. It passes an hour and will leave you with a tear in your eye if you are not completely cynical. However it is no great advance on the cinematic art and will soon be discarded for more sophisticated offerings".

When the film premiered on Fox, it was the highest-rated television program among children between the ages of two and five. Annabelle's Wish was also among the top-five best-selling videos during November and December 1997 and was Hallmark Home Entertainment's best-selling video as of January 1998. A portion of the video sale revenues were donated to the Make-A-Wish Foundation.

== See also ==
- List of Christmas films
- Santa Claus in film
