= Metromedia =

American media company

Metromedia, Inc.
- Formerly: DuMont Broadcasting Corporation (1956–1957); Metropolitan Broadcasting Corporation (1957–1961)
- Type: Public
- Industry: Media
- Predecessor: Allen B. DuMont Laboratories
- Founded: 1956; 70 years ago (as DuMont Broadcasting Corporation)
- Defunct: 1997; 29 years ago (as a media company)
- Fate: Sold off, corporate name continues as owner of MetroMedia Technologies
- Successor: Amazon MGM Studios (content library); Fox Television Stations (broadcast stations)
- Headquarters: New York City, New York, U.S.
- Area served: Worldwide
- Key people: John W. Kluge (founder/chairman/CEO); Stuart Subotnick (current president/CEO); William Ishida (president/CEO, Metromedia Technologies, Inc.)
- Products: Television; Radio; Entertainment; Advertising
- Services: Advertising; Media display
- Subsidiaries: Orion Pictures; The Samuel Goldwyn Company; Motion Picture Corporation of America; Metropolitan Broadcasting Corporation

Metromedia, Inc. (also often MetroMedia) was an American media company that owned radio and television stations in the United States from 1956 to 1986 and controlled Orion Pictures from 1988 to 1997. Metromedia was established in 1956 after the DuMont Television Network ceased operations and its owned-and-operated stations were spun off into a separate company. Metromedia sold its television stations to News Corporation in 1985 (which News Corporation then used to form the nucleus of Fox Television Stations), and spun off its radio stations into a separate company in 1986. Metromedia then acquired ownership stakes in various film studios, including controlling ownership in Orion. In 1997, Metromedia closed down and sold its media assets to Metro-Goldwyn-Mayer.

== History ==
=== Origins ===
The company arose from the ashes of the DuMont Television Network, the world's first commercial television network. DuMont had been in economic trouble throughout its existence, and was seriously undermined when ABC accepted a buyout offer from United Paramount Theaters in 1953. The ABC-UPT deal gave ABC the resources to operate a national television service along the lines of CBS and NBC. DuMont officials quickly realized the ABC-UPT deal put their network on life support, and agreed in principle to merge with ABC. However, it was forced to back out of the deal when minority owner Paramount Pictures raised antitrust concerns. UPT had only spun off from Paramount four years earlier, and there were still doubts about whether the two companies were really separate.

By 1955, DuMont realized it could not compete against the other three networks and decided to wind down its operations. Soon after DuMont formally shut down network service in 1956, the parent firm DuMont Laboratories spun off the network's two remaining owned and operated stations, WABD in New York City and WTTG in Washington, D.C., to shareholders as the DuMont Broadcasting Corporation. The company's headquarters were co-located with WABD in the former DuMont Tele-Centre (which was later renamed the Metromedia Telecenter) in New York.

In 1957, DuMont Broadcasting purchased two New York area radio stations, WNEW (now WBBR) and WHFI (later WNEW-FM and WWFS), and later that year changed its name to the Metropolitan Broadcasting Corporation to distance itself from its former parent company. The following year, Paramount sold its shares in Metropolitan Broadcasting to Washington-based investor John Kluge, enough to give Kluge controlling interest. Kluge installed himself as chairman, and later increased his holdings to 75 percent. WABD's call letters were later changed to WNEW-TV to match its new radio sisters.

=== Expansion ===
1970s logo for WTCN-TV (now KARE) in Minneapolis, which included the corporate logo for Metromedia; this logo was also used by KTTV in Los Angeles, WXIX in Cincinnati, and WTTG in Washington D.C.

Metropolitan Broadcasting's first acquisitions included WHK-AM-FM in Cleveland (in 1958); the Foster & Kleiser outdoor advertising firm (in 1959); and KOVR in Stockton, California, Benedict Gimbel Jr.-owned WIP-AM-FM in Philadelphia, WTVH-TV (now WHOI) in Peoria, Illinois, and WTVP television (now WAND) in Decatur, Illinois (all in 1960). In 1961, Metropolitan purchased KMBC-AM-TV in Kansas City, Missouri. Later that year the company's name was changed to Metromedia; the Metropolitan Broadcasting name was retained for its broadcasting division until 1967.

In separate 1963 deals, the company expanded into Los Angeles, buying first KTTV and later KLAC and the original KLAC-FM (now KIIS-FM). The company would later engineer a swap of FM facilities; the second KLAC-FM (later KMET and now KTWV) was established in 1965. Metromedia also entered the realm of live entertainment by purchasing the Ice Capades (in 1963) and the Harlem Globetrotters (in 1967). Later in the decade, Metromedia opened a television production center in Los Angeles, known as Metromedia Square, which served as the studio facility for numerous network programs. Metromedia also owned a TV production and distribution company called Metromedia Producers Corporation (MPC), established in 1968 from Wolper Productions. The MPC unit was originally Wolper Productions, before Wolper split from Metromedia in 1968 as a result of an aborted merger attempt with Transamerica, and consequently Wolper Television Sales was renamed to Metromedia Program Sales, before being dropped in favor of the MPC name. MPC produced and syndicated various programs and TV movies, most notably the game show Truth or Consequences and the 1972-86 version of The Merv Griffin Show. In 1972, Metromedia acquired WCHF in Chicago, WOMC in Detroit, WTCN-TV in Minneapolis, and WXIX-TV in Cincinnati in separate deals. In 1976, it teamed up with MTM Enterprises to launch a first-run syndicated variety show.

Metromedia entered the record business in 1969 with the launch of the Metromedia Records label, whose biggest-selling artist was Bobby Sherman. The label was also notable as having issued the first two studio albums of Peter Allen, Peter Allen (1971) and Tenterfield Saddler (1972). The label was closed in 1974. Allen's Tenterfield Saddler, the title song of which has become an Australian standard, was acquired and reissued by A&M Records in 1978.

In 1976, similar to the more successful SFM Holiday Network of syndicated stations launched two years later, Metromedia teamed up with Ogilvy and Mather for a proposed linking of independent TV stations termed MetroNet. The proposed programming would consist of several Sunday night family dramas, on weeknights a half-hour serial and a gothic series similar to Dark Shadows, and on Saturdays a variety program hosted by Charo. The plans for MetroNet failed when advertisers balked at Metromedia's advertising rate, which was only slightly lower than the Big Three's and low national coverage, leaving for another similar operation, Operation Prime Time. Metromedia also invested into an affiliation deal with Paramount Television Service, but it never came to fruition. In 1978, Metromedia acquired stations KRLD in Dallas and KRIV-TV in Houston. In 1979, Metromedia Producers Corporation had also reached a deal with Bob Stewart Productions for an exclusive co-producing agreement.

In 1982, Metromedia made its biggest broadcasting purchase when it acquired WCVB-TV in Boston for $220 million, which at the time was the largest amount ever spent on a single television station property. Two years later, John Kluge bought out Metromedia's shareholders and took the company private.

Also around this time, Metromedia attempted to bring to the air a national newscast for independent stations (much as the rival Tribune Company had created Independent Network News in 1980), planned for launch in the fall of 1983. Unlike INN, the program was planned to be offered as a hybrid, hour-long local/national newscast, fed to affiliates by satellite as a headlines block and three other segments, which could be aired by local stations in whatever order the stations deemed alongside locally produced news content. Also as part of this plan, Metromedia established full news departments for KRIV in Houston and what was then KRLD-TV in Dallas (another news department was planned for WFLD in Chicago, but that department ultimately didn't launch until 1987, after the Murdoch buyout). Metromedia attempted to hire Charles Kuralt away from CBS News to serve as anchor. Kuralt chose to stay to with CBS; John Hart was also considered as an anchor, but ultimately the planned newscast never came to fruition.

In 1983, the company expanded its foray into original scripted programming by hiring Metromedia to finance two shows rescued from cancellation, Fame and Too Close for Comfort. The company followed this up with Rituals, a soap opera in collaboration with Telepictures Corporation, that lasted only one season.

In 1985, it made an attempt to revive the comedy Oh, Madeline as The Madeline Kahn Show for first-run syndication, but the deal never came to fruition. Also, the company was a consortium of the New Program Group, along with Gannett, Hearst Broadcasting, Storer Communications and Taft Broadcasting, who produced the show Small Wonder.

=== 1985-86 divestitures ===
On May 4, 1985, Kluge announced the sale of Metromedia's television stations, and Metromedia Producers Corp., to News Corporation (owned by Australian newspaper publisher Rupert Murdoch) and 20th Century Fox Film Corporation (owned jointly by Murdoch and Marvin Davis) for $3.5 billion. A separate bid for Metromedia Producers by Robert M. Bennett was considered, but he was outbid by Fox. With the exception of WCVB-TV (which was subsequently sold to the Hearst Corporation), all of the former Metromedia stations formed the nucleus of the Fox Broadcasting Company (which began operations on October 9, 1986), while MPC was folded into 20th Century Fox Television. The transactions became official on March 6, 1986. Because of these transactions, and the fact that Metromedia was originally spun off from the DuMont Television Network, radio personality Clarke Ingram has suggested that the Fox network is a revival or at least a linear descendant of DuMont.

Kluge also sold Metromedia's outdoor advertising firm, the Harlem Globetrotters, and the Ice Capades in 1985, its cellular phone and yellow pages divisions to the Southwestern Bell Corporation (now known as the second incarnation of AT&T, due to SBC's acquisition of AT&T Corporation in 2005) under the leadership of Zane Barnes, Robert G. Pope, and J.B. Ellis. They also spun off the radio stations into a separate company (which took on the Metropolitan Broadcasting name) before they were sold to various other owners by the early 1990s.

=== Legal battles ===
In retaliation for a lawsuit brought by Paul Winchell, who sought the rights to his children's television program Winchell-Mahoney Time, which was produced at KTTV in Los Angeles during the mid-1960s, it is believed that KTTV management destroyed the program's video tapes. In 1989 Winchell was awarded nearly $18 million as compensation for Metromedia's capricious behavior.

In 1983, Christine Craft, a former evening news co-anchor at KMBC-TV in Kansas City, sued Metromedia on claims of fraud and sexual discrimination. After spending eight months at KMBC-TV in 1981, she was demoted to reporting assignment after a focus group study claimed Craft was "too old, too unattractive and not deferential to men" in the eyes of viewers. Craft declined the reassignment and subsequently resigned from the station. Craft initially won her case, though she lost on appeal at the U.S. Supreme Court.

=== Ownership of film studios ===
On May 22, 1986, Metromedia acquired a 6.5% stake in Orion Pictures Corporation; a movie and television production studio. By December, the stake in Orion's ownership was increased from 9.3% to 12.6% and on April 12, 1988, to 44.1% On May 20, 1988, Metromedia acquired Sumner Redstone's share for $78 million, holding a majority stake in Orion Pictures worth nearly 67%. In 1995, Kluge merged Orion, MCEG Sterling Entertainment (producer of the Look Who's Talking series), the holding company Actava, and Metromedia into a new Metromedia International Group. In November 1995, Metromedia announced that it would acquire Motion Picture Corporation of America (MPCA) for $32 million, followed by The Samuel Goldwyn Company for $115 million in February 1996. On April 11, 1997, Metromedia sold Orion/Goldwyn and MPCA to Metro-Goldwyn-Mayer (MGM) for $573 million and was closed on July 10 of the same year. In 1998, MPCA broke apart from MGM becoming independent again.

=== Activities following film sale ===
Following the sale of the film business to MGM, Metromedia still owned Metromedia Restaurant Group (which it had renamed from S&A Restaurant Group, which was acquired from Grand Metropolitan) in 1990 as well as Metromedia Fiber Network. The latter went bankrupt a few years later and became AboveNet, while the former went bankrupt in 2008. Metromedia International operated subscription television operators (Kosmos-TV, Alma TV, Ala TV, Kamalak TV) and private radio stations in Eastern Europe and CIS countries; by 2006 following the sale of most assets, it bought Magticom in Georgia to ease financial burden from filing for Chapter 11 bankruptcy. Most assets were joint-ventures with government-linked companies. Its Kazakh operations were put in a state of limbo in 2002 due to regulatory issues.

== Typeface ==
Beginning in 1967, Metromedia's television stations began utilizing a sans-serif typeface for their on-air logo. The typeface was a proprietary one called Metromedia Television Alphabet, which was as distinctive as the typeface employed by Group W unit of Westinghouse Electric for its TV and radio stations beginning in 1963. Metromedia Television Alphabet was used for the channel numbers of its television stations until 1977, when another typeface modeled slightly after the Futura family was introduced.

== Former stations ==
- Stations are arranged in alphabetical order by state and city of license.
- Two boldface asterisks appearing following a station's call letters (**) indicate a station built and signed on by either Metromedia or predecessor Dumont.

Stations owned by Metromedia
Media market	State/Dist.	Station	Purchased	Sold	Notes
Los Angeles	California	KLAC	1963	1984	
Los Angeles	California	KLAC-FM	1963	1965	
Los Angeles	California	KMET	1965	1986	(Note: Known as KLAC-FM prior to 1968.)
Los Angeles	California	KTTV	1963	1986	
San Francisco–Oakland	California	KNEW	1966	1980	
San Francisco–Oakland	California	KNEW-TV	1968	1970	
San Francisco–Oakland	California	KSAN-FM	1966	1981	
Sacramento	California	KOVR	1959	1964	
Denver	Colorado	KHOW	1981	1985	
Washington, D.C.	District of Columbia	WASH-FM	1968	1986	
Washington, D.C.	District of Columbia	WTTG **	1956	1986	
Tampa–St. Petersburg	Florida	WWBA-FM	1981	1986	
Chicago	Illinois	WFLD-TV	1983	1986	
Chicago	Illinois	WMET-FM	1972	1983	(Note: Known as WDHF prior to 1976.)
Springfield	Illinois	WTVP	1960	1965	
Peoria–Bloomington	Illinois	WTVH-TV	1959	1965	
Baltimore	Maryland	WCBM	1963	1986	
Baltimore	Maryland	WCBM-FM	1963	1968	
Boston	Massachusetts	WCVB-TV	1982	1986	
Detroit	Michigan	WOMC	1972	1986	
Minneapolis–St. Paul	Minnesota	WTCN-TV	1972	1983	
Kansas City	Missouri	KMBC	1961	1967	
Kansas City	Missouri	KMBC-FM **	1962	1967	
Kansas City	Missouri	KMBC-TV	1961	1982	(Note: The acquisition of KMBC-AM-TV also included KMOS-TV in Sedalia, Missouri, and KFRM radio in Concordia, Kansas. Both stations were subsequently spun off by Metropolitan Broadcasting to other firms.)
New York City	New York	WNEW	1957	1986	
New York City	New York	WNEW-FM **	1958	1986	
New York City	New York	WNEW-TV **	1956	1986	(Note: Known as WABD prior to 1958.)
Cincinnati	Ohio	WXIX-TV	1972	1983	
Cleveland	Ohio	WHK	1958	1972	
Cleveland	Ohio	WMMS	1958	1972	(Note: Known as WHK-FM prior to 1968.)
Philadelphia	Pennsylvania	WIP	1959	1986	
Philadelphia	Pennsylvania	WMMR	1959	1986	(Note: Known as WIP-FM prior to 1966.)
Dallas–Fort Worth	Texas	KRLD	1978	1986	
Dallas–Fort Worth	Texas	KRLD-TV	1983	1986	
Houston	Texas	KRIV-TV	1978	1986	
Seattle–Tacoma	Washington	KJR	1980	1984	

== Television syndication ==
This is a list of television programs that were produced and/or syndicated by Metromedia Producers Corporation (MPC):

- Allen Ludden's Gallery (1969)
- The Ann Sothern Show (1958–1961)
- B.A.D. Cats (Note: Rights now owned by CBS Media Ventures.)
- Charlie's Angels (Note: Currently distributed by Sony Pictures Television.)
- Chopper One
- The Cross-Wits (1975–1980) (co-produced with Ralph Edwards Productions)
- Crusader Rabbit (1950–1952, 1956–1959) (Note: Currently distributed by Disney-ABC Domestic Television)
- Dusty's Trail (1973–1974) (co-produced with Redwood Productions and Writer First Productions)
- Dynasty (distributor, 1985–1986)
- Expedition Danger
- Family
- Firehouse (1974) (co-produced with Stonehenge Productions)
- Groovie Goolies and Friends (Note: Currently owned by NBCUniversal (via DreamWorks Animation).)
- The Great Space Coaster (co-produced with Sunbow Productions) (Note: Currently owned by Tanslin Media.)
- Hart to Hart
- Here We Go Again (1973)
- Hit Man (co-produced with Jay Wolpert Productions)
- Jane Goodall and the World of Animal Behavior
- Jeopardy! (original version - distributor, 1974)
- Kids Are People Too (1978–1982)
- Little Gloria... Happy at Last (1982; mini-series)
- Mayberry RFD (distributor) (Note: Currently distributed by Warner Bros. Television.)
- The Merv Griffin Show (distributor/co-producer, 1972–1983) (Note: Currently distributed by Reelin' In the Years Productions on behalf of The Griffin Group.)
- Movin' On (distributor) (Note: Currently distributed by the Peter Rodgers Organization.)
- My Favorite Martian (distributor)
- National Geographic Specials (1964–1971)
- The New Avengers (U.S. distributor) (Note: Rights now owned by StudioCanal.)
- The New Howdy Doody Show (1976–1977)
- Primus (1971–1972) (co-produced with Ivan Tors Films)
- Queen for a Day (1969–1970)
- S.W.A.T.
- Small Wonder (production company, 1985–1986)
- Soul Train (syndicated by Tribune Entertainment then Trifecta Entertainment & Media; rights now owned by Paramount Media Networks)
- Star Search (production company, 1983–1986)
- Starsky & Hutch
- Strange Paradise
- Strike Force
- The Super (1972)
- Super Pay Cards (1981–1982; distributor)
- Susie (1953–1957)
- T. J. Hooker
- That Girl (distributor) (Note: Later distributed by Worldvision Enterprises and Shout! Factory; currently distributed by Paul Brownstein Productions.)
- Thicke of the Night (distributor)
- Too Close for Comfort (1980–1987) (co-produced with D.L. Taffner Productions)
- Truth or Consequences (distributor, 1966–1978) (co-produced with Ralph Edwards Productions)
- The Undersea World of Jacques Cousteau
- Untamed World (co-produced with the CTV Television Network)
- Vauldeville
- Vega$ (1978–1981) (distributor)
- Wild Times (1980; mini-series)
- Winchell-Mahoney Time (1965–1968) (Note: Rights now owned by Paul Winchell's family.)
- Wonderama (1955–1977, 1980–1983)
