= Jerry Bishop =

American announcer (1935–2020)

- Born: Gerald Blume; October 19, 1935; Hartford, Connecticut, U.S.
- Died: April 21, 2020 (aged 84); Los Angeles, California, U.S.
- Occupations: Announcer and radio personality
- Known for: Announcer – Judge Judy
- Spouse: Velma Joan Leventhal (m. 1956; died 2007)
- Children: 3

Jerry Bishop (October 19, 1935 – April 21, 2020) was an American announcer, radio host and radio personality. Bishop is best known as the announcer for the American courtroom television show, Judge Judy, for 23 years from 1997 until his death in 2020. Prior to this, Bishop enjoyed a long career as a morning show host at some of the largest radio stations in Los Angeles, including KLAC, KFI and KIIS-FM from the 1960s to the 1980s.

== Biography ==
Bishop was born Gerald Blume in Hartford, Connecticut, on October 19, 1935. He received his bachelor's degree in broadcast journalism from Emerson College in Boston. He married Velma Joan Leventhal in 1956; they remained together until her death in 2007.

Following his arrogation from Emerson College, Bishop began working at WDRC (AM), a radio station in Hartford, Connecticut. In 1963, he moved to San Diego, California, to take a radio host position at KCBQ. He then joined KLAC, an AM radio station in Los Angeles, in 1963.

Bishop remained at KLAC until 1969, when he was hired by KFI, where he worked for the next five years. He co-hosted KFI's "Sports Phone," a sports radio call-in show that aired prior to the station's broadcasts of Los Angeles Dodgers baseball games. He switched to KIIS-FM during the 1970s, where he co-hosted a radio show called "Tom and Jerry Show" alongside Tom Murphy beginning in 1979. Over the course of his radio career, Bishop interviewed a number of celebrities and entertainers, including Steve McQueen, Frank Sinatra, and Natalie Wood.

Jerry Bishop simultaneously began working as a voice-over artist and announcer during the 1970s. He was the announcer for the television game show, The Cross-Wits, as well as the short-lived NBC variety series, Dick Clark's Live Wednesday, which aired briefly in 1978. He also narrated a string of national television and radio commercials for Budweiser, Burger King and Coors. He also recorded show promos for ABC and NBC.

He spent fifteen years as the announcer and official voice of Disney Channel from 1983 to 1997.

Bishop began working as the off-camera announcer for the syndicated television courtroom show, Judge Judy, beginning with the series' second season in 1997. He remained with Judge Judy for 24 years as the show became the highest rated series on daytime television. Bishop continued to work on Judge Judy until a few weeks before his death in 2020.

A resident of the Bel Air neighborhood of Los Angeles, Bishop attended his synagogue, Chabad of Bel Air, daily and actively studied the Talmud.

== Death ==
Bishop died of heart and kidney failure on April 21, 2020, at the age of 84. He had a brother, three daughters—Karen Rosenbloom, Michelle Carriker and Stephanie Blume—and three grandchildren at the time of his death.
