= Bzzz! =

American game show

- Written by: Neal Brennan; Cynthia Kitts; Anthony Marsh
- Directed by: Bob Loudin
- Presented by: Annie Wood
- Country of origin: United States
- No. of seasons: 2

Production
- Executive producers: Ralph Edwards; Stu Billett; John Rhinehart
- Producer: Lynn Speigel
- Running time: approx. 22-24 minutes
- Production companies: Ralph Edwards/Stu Billett Productions; 435 Production Company

Original release
- Network: Syndication
- Release: January 22, 1996 – September 5, 1997

Bzzz! is an American relationship game show that first aired in limited syndication, produced by Ralph Edwards/Stu Billett Productions in cooperation with Tribune Entertainment, which handled distribution.

The series premiered on January 22, 1996, for a limited trial run, primarily on Tribune's own group of stations; it later expanded to full national syndication for one season, airing from September 9, 1996, to September 5, 1997, with reruns continuing on some stations until 2001.

The show was hosted by Annie Wood, who also served as co-producer. Reruns of the series were first aired on Superstation WGN from 2000 to 2001 (including the original "trial run" season), while Buzzr aired the series Saturday nights from February 15, 2020, to July 25, 2020.

== Premise ==
The show itself was a fast-paced variant of The Dating Game in which a bachelor and bachelorette competed against each other to win a date with a member of the opposite sex, as well as money.

== Reception ==
Howard Rosenberg, writing in the Los Angeles Times, found the "show’s stupidity [was] relentless". Evette Porter, of The Village Voice, called the show "superficial" and "manic", with its pace described as "maddening".
