= Alma TV =

Alma TV is a Kazakh provider of subscription television and internet services, founded in 1994 and commencing regular service in 1995.

== History ==
Alma TV was created in 1994 by Metromedia International and Nurbank, a company controlled by Nursultan Nazarbayev's son-in-law, Rakhat Aliyev. Its launch caused an amendment to existing laws in Kazakhstan allowing foreign capital to own media outlets in the country, but with restrictions. The first subscriber to the MMDS network was connected on 16 May 1995. Alma TV also took part in the creation of Ala TV in Bishkek. In 2002, the company's license was under jeopardy due to new restrictions on foreign ownership of media companies, at a time where several independent media outlets were shutting down. As of March 2002, it had claimed 60,000 subscribers in Almaty and Almaty Oblast. In 2015, subscribers complained over the prices charged for connecting to five channels out of 80.
