= Odd One Out =

British game show

- Genre: Game show
- Based on: Knockout by Mark Maxwell-Smith
- Presented by: Paul Daniels
- Announcer: Alexis Korner; John Junkin; Colin Ward Lewis
- Country of origin: United Kingdom
- Original language: English
- No. of series: 4
- No. of episodes: 46

Production
- Running time: 30 minutes

Original release
- Network: BBC1
- Release: 16 April 1982 – 19 April 1985

Odd One Out is a British game show based on the original American version Knockout. It aired on BBC1 from 16 April 1982 to 19 April 1985 and was hosted by Paul Daniels.

== Gameplay ==
The object of Odd One Out is to guess which one of four items does not belong and why it doesn't belong. After the player has successfully identified the odd one out, they can either guess the explanation or challenge their opponents to guess. Choosing the correct item would score two points, and figuring out why it didn't belong by guessing the common bond of the other three or a successful challenge is worth three points more, for a total of five points.

Six contestants appeared each week with three contestants playing in the first half and the other three playing in the second half of the programme. The leader at the end of each game won a chance to play a bonus game for a nice prize.

=== Bonus game ===
In the bonus game, the winning player is given up to three clues within which to guess the common bond between them. A correct answer wins a prize according to how many clues are used; using all three clues wins a small prize, using two wins a medium prize, and using just the first clue wins a large prize.

After both winners play their bonus round, they face off in the final game.

=== The final game ===
In the final game, pictures, sounds, and words are played in each question. Scoring remains the same. When time runs out, the player with the most points goes on to play the end game for a grand prize.

=== The end game ===
The end game is played the same as the bonus games, except for the fact that the winning player only gets one clue. The player can choose to see clue from the top, middle, or bottom; then host Daniels tells the player that the clue is easy, medium, or hard. After that, the player has five seconds to think it over and then guess the common bond. If he/she is correct, the winning player wins the grand prize.

== Champion's rule ==
Originally, players could stay on the show as long as they won. During the final series, however, champions stayed for a maximum of three shows.

== Transmissions ==
| Series | Start date | End date | Episodes |
|---|---|---|---|
| 1 | 16 April 1982 | 18 June 1982 | 10 |
| 2 | 22 April 1983 | 8 July 1983 | 12 |
| 3 | 6 April 1984 | 29 June 1984 | 12 |
| 4 | 24 January 1985 | 19 April 1985 | 12 |
