= Moral Court =

American syndicated court show

- Genre: Nontraditional court show
- Created by: Stu Billett
- Starring: Larry Elder; Vivian Guzman; Russell Brown (II)
- Country of origin: United States
- No. of seasons: 1

Production
- Producers: Harvey Levin; John Downey III
- Running time: 30 minutes
- Production company: Stu Billett Productions

Original release
- Network: Syndication
- Release: October 2, 2000 – May 23, 2001

Moral Court is an American syndicated nontraditional court show hosted by Larry Elder, that aired in the 2000–01 television season.

The program had the same concept as a traditional court show, though without the common element of binding arbitration. The cases presented on the show were often not able to be contested in a courtroom and were based instead on opinion-based ethics and morality, with the winner of the case whose argument won Elder over leaving with a cash prize. If he found one party to be merely wrong, $500 was awarded. If he finds it to be a more serious moral problem, he terms it offensive and $1,000 was awarded. If the problem was termed 'outrageous', he awarded the show's maximum judgment of $2,000. Elder would dismiss the case if both were found to be in the wrong, with no cash awarded.

After every case, court reporter/interviewer Vivian Guzman would ask both parties a few questions and let them state their opinion on the outcome of the case. As there was no plaintiff or defendant, the parties were instead referred to as the 'accuser' and 'accused'.

Moral Court was low rated in its only season in production. The show was distributed by Warner Bros. Domestic Television Distribution and produced by Stu Billett Productions Inc. as a sister show to The People's Court.

The series continued to run in syndication in repeats up until 2006. It was also carried by ION Television from April to June 2007 when Warner Bros. leased time on the network to program.

== Cast ==
- Larry Elder - Host and Judge
- Vivian Guzman - Court Reporter and Interviewer
- Russell Brown II - Bailiff
