= About Faces =

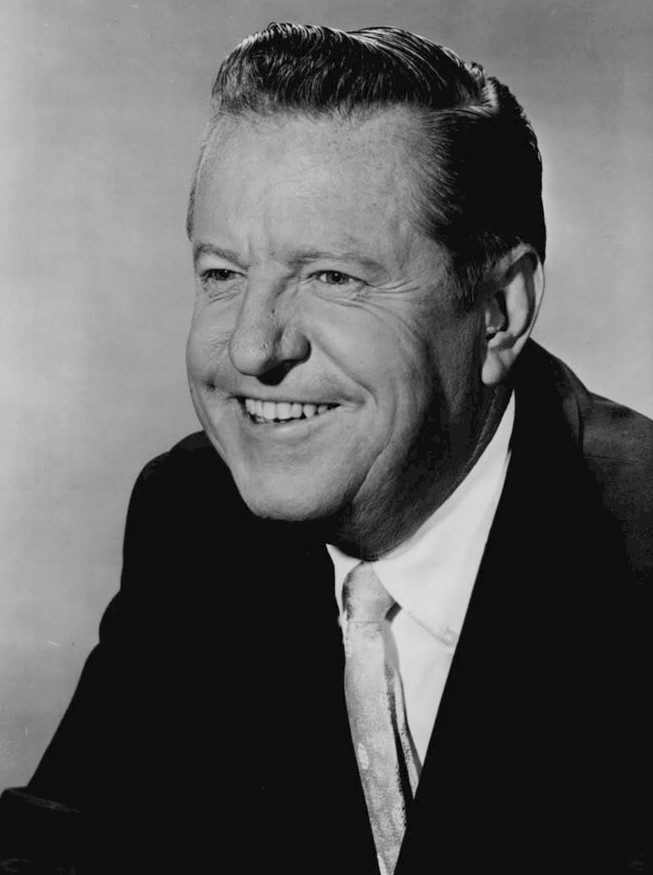
- Ben Alexander, the show's host.
- Genre: Game show
- Created by: Ralph Edwards
- Presented by: Ben Alexander
- Announcer: Tom Kennedy
- Country of origin: United States
- Original language: English

Production
- Camera setup: Multi-camera
- Running time: 25 minutes
- Production company: Ralph Edwards Productions

Original release
- Network: ABC
- Release: January 4, 1960 – June 30, 1961

About Faces is an American game show that aired from January 4, 1960, to June 30, 1961, created by Ralph Edwards. The host was Ben Alexander and the show's announcer was Tom Kennedy.

== Gameplay ==
Competitors were selected from the studio audience. Each pair of contestants was challenged to recall how the two of them had come into contact with each other previously. The first to do so won a prize. The program was similar to Place the Face.

For guest stars who appeared on the program, Alexander interviewed the star briefly before a "mystery person out of the star's past" was shown inside a picture frame. The star then heard a series of clues to help him or her identify the person in the frame.

== Schedule and production ==
About Faces was broadcast from 1 to 1:30 p. m. Eastern Time Monday through Friday. The show was recorded on videotape. After the show's run on ABC ended, its reruns were broadcast in some local markets. Joe Landis was the producer and director. A trio of researchers spent at least 75 hours each week on efforts including telegrams, telephone calls, and personal interviews to locate people for reunions.

== Guest stars ==
Guest stars who appeared on the show included Barbara Nichols, Joan Blondell, Rosemary Clooney, Jose Ferrer, and Olaf Odegaard.

== Episode status ==
The UCLA Film and Television Archive lists among its holdings the premiere episode with Zsa Zsa Gabor, Red Schoendienst (and family), Fred Haney, and Douglas "Wrong Way" Corrigan. The March 17 edition exists on YouTube with Tom Kennedy as substitute host.

The Paley Center for Media lists among its holdings the series pilot, taped May 6, 1959. Ferrer and Clooney are listed as the celebrity guests for that episode.
