= Superior Court (TV series) =

American court show

- Genre: Dramatized court show/Reality legal programming
- Judges: William D. Burns Jr. (1986–87); Jill Jakes and Louis Welsh (1987–88); Raymond St. Jacques as Judge Clayton C. Thomas (1988–89)
- No. of seasons: 4
- No. of episodes: c. 760

Production
- Executive producer: Stu Billett
- Running time: 22 minutes
- Production companies: Stu Billett Productions; Ralph Edwards Productions

Original release
- Network: Syndication
- Release: September 7, 1986 – 1989

Superior Court is an American dramatized court show that aired in syndication from 1986 to 1989, and featured fictionalized re-enactments of actual court cases.

William D. Burns, Jr., a former municipal court commissioner for the city of Beverly Hills, presided for the first season. He was replaced for the second season by Jill Jakes, a former judge of that court, and Louis M. Welsh, a retired San Diego Superior Court judge. In the final season, actor Raymond St. Jacques portrayed Judge Clayton C. Thomas.

Reruns were later aired on the USA Network during the early 1990s.

== Format ==
Superior Court was one of a series of dramatized court shows that were created in the mid- to late-1980s, on the heels of two successful programs in the genre: Divorce Court and The People's Court (which was its sister show, being produced by the same studio and production company). Of the two, Superior Court was more like Divorce Court, which involved recreations of actual proceedings.

On Superior Court, actors portrayed the attorneys, the plaintiff(s) (in civil proceedings where compensation was demanded), the defendant(s) (in both civil and criminal stories) and key witnesses. As the stories were set in a single urban area (the city was called Madison Heights), often attorneys, law enforcement officials and others became semi-regulars on the show.

Each episode followed a basic formula, as follows:

- Each attorney giving opening statements.
- Each side presenting their case. Often, one or two supporting witness would testify on behalf of the appropriate side, along with cross-examination.
- Closing arguments.
- The decision, either by the judge or (sometimes) the jury, followed by appropriate reactions by each side. A voice-over announcer then gave an on-screen postlogue, telling viewers what became of the principal figures in the case. If a social issue was addressed that played a major role in the trial, the postlogue also included what changed—or did not change—as a result of the trial's outcome.

Both criminal and civil proceedings were presented. Like Divorce Court, the writers of Superior Court tended to focus on "shock value" rather than routine cases (to maintain viewer interest). Some examples:

- A young murder defendant is accused of killing a romantic rival after being spurned by a young woman. The defendant, however, claims he saw the murder play out in a dream, with the actual perpetrator another man whom authorities are unable to locate.
- An elderly farmer who was swindled out of $1 million by an unethical banker, who had attempted eminent domain on his property to develop low-cost housing.
- A collegiate football star who, along with two teammates, are accused of raping a young woman during what was supposed to be a study date. In the end, the jury delivers a shocking verdict that will outrage the judge.
- Neighbors who, frustrated with constant speeding in their residential neighborhood and perceived inaction by the city council, take matters into their own hands by creating a "speed bump," one that after a major accident cripples a young woman and kills her boyfriend.
- A blue collar-worker, accused in the beating death of his wife, contends that his wife had been involved in a car accident, and the force from a bowling ball carried in the car, claimed to have been throw into the front seat of the car and into the back of the woman's head upon impact, was to blame.
- A seven-year-old girl accused of killing her five-year-old sister, and her father – a respected Southern Baptist minister and community leader – adamantly objects to his daughter becoming a ward of the state. When the girl is called to the witness stand to explain her actions, she is very timid until the judge has her father removed from the courtroom; he had noticed he had been intimidating her from the gallery ... and in the end, some very sinister, well-concealed secrets rise to the surface.
- A serial killer, charged in the rapes and murders of several young women, maintained an insanity plea, noting that "God" had told him to commit the murders because they were too beautiful to live.
- A police officer, when responding to a domestic disturbance, shoots and kills a man who was beating up his wife. The officer eventually is forced to reveal some very painful secrets from his childhood, telling how they influenced his stance on domestic violence and, ultimately, his actions toward the abuser.

Some episodes had one case, which lasted the entire show, while others had two. While most of the cases were serious, there was the occasional case—unusual or quirky by its circumstances, but could happen—that was played more for comedic value.
