= Annie Wood =

American actress

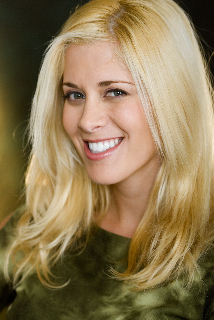
- Wood in 2007
- Other names: Annie W, the Big W, Anne The One
- Occupations: Actress, host, writer
- Years active: 1990–present
- Website: anniewood.com

Annie Wood is an American actress, host and writer, and is best known as the host of the nationally syndicated dating game show Bzzz!.

== Career ==
Wood was Cameron Diaz's sister-in-law in My Sister's Keeper and appeared in the role of sexy and quirky "Lara" in the Lionsgate Dane Cook/Jessica Alba movie Good Luck Chuck. Her television credits include ER, Joey, NYPD Blue, Becker, Costello, Strong Medicine and Disney's That's So Raven!.

Wood appeared as guest on The Tonight Show with Jay Leno and Politically Incorrect with Bill Maher. She performed stand-up comedy at The Improv in Los Angeles following Jerry Seinfeld, and has authored several books including, Dandy Day, A Quantum Love Adventure and her first young adult novel, Just a Girl in the Whirl, which will be out in 2021.

== Filmography ==
=== Film ===
Year	Title	Role	Notes
1991	Breathing Fire	April	
1992	Inside Out IV	Ms. Morley	Direct-to-video
1995	Cellblock Sisters: Banished Behind Bars	April	
1995	Caged Hearts	Marcy	
2006	Christopher Brennan Saves the World	Diora	Short film
2006	Heart of Fear	Samantha Hunt	Direct-to-video
2007	Good Luck Chuck	Lara	
2009	Numbers	Angie Rubin	Short film
2009	My Sister's Keeper	Uncle Tommy's wife	
2009	Fb	Becca	Short film
2010	Here & Now	(voice)	Short film
2010	Karma's a Bitch	Karma	Short film
2010	Monkey Mind	Sally	Short film
2011	Going Down in LA-LA Land	Sitcom Wife	
2012	Attack of the 50 Foot Cheerleader	Cheerleader (voice)	
2019	A Day in the Park	Alice	Short film
2019	Circus Sam	Nurse (voice)	Short film
2021	Nessie & Bessie: a tale of two monsters	Nessie (voice)	Short film

=== Television ===
Year	Title	Role	Notes
1990	Fall from Grace	Jessica Hahn	Television film
1995	Love Street	Laura/Tara	Episode: "Second Chance"
1996	Lush Life	Guest Star	Episode: "Lush Beginning"
1996–1997	Bzzz!	Host	
1997	The Tonight Show with Jay Leno	guest	
1998	Costello	Mae Mae	3 episodes
1998–2000	Becker	Theresa Campbell	3 episodes
2000	ER	Amber Skye	Episode: "Flight of Fancy"
2001, 2003	Strong Medicine	Molly	2 episodes
2001	NYPD Blue	Tiffany	Episode: "Nariz a Nariz"
2001	Dead Last	Waitress	Episode: "Teen Spirit"
2002	For Your Love	Miss Hall	Episode: "The Helpless Hand"
2005	Joey	The Trashy Woman	Episode: "Joey and the Wrong Man"
2006	The Chelsea Handler Show	Book Club Hostess	Episode: "Episode #1.6"
2006	That's So Raven!	Kendra Blair	Episode: "Checkin' Out"
2012	School and Board	Sasha	4 episodes
2013	Karma's a B*tch	Karma	Also creator and writer
2014	The Comeback Kids	Sharon Rock, Jennifer	2 episodes
2015	The Exes	Sarah	Episode: "Finding Mr. Wrong"
2015	Karma's a B*Tch - The Series	Karma	3 episodes
2015	The Listening Box	Confessor V / O	Television short
2016	Instant Karma	Karma	3 episodes
2020	The Quarantine Bunch	Mary Spielberg	Episode: "Stay The F**k Home!"
2021	The Corona Dialogues: a Dylan Brody project	Michelle Winter	Episode: "DreamPlay"

=== Video games ===
Year	Title	Role	Notes
2004	Tekken 5	Julia Chang	Uncredited
2012	Street Fighter X Tekken	Julia Chang	English version
2020	Mafia: Definitive Edition	Dorothy	

== Awards ==
Year	Award	Nominee / work	Category	Result
2013	LA Web Fest	School and Board	Best Ensemble Cast Mockumentary	Won
2024	Hollywood Gold Awards	Are You a Star Yet?	Best Supper Short Folm	Won
