= Stu Billett =

American television producer (1935–2021)

- Billett in 2000
- Born: Stewart C. Billett; November 19, 1935
- Died: October 22, 2021 (aged 85); Los Angeles, California, U.S.
- Occupation: Television producer
- Known for: Executive producer/creator – The People's Court
- Spouse: Lucy Billet

Stewart C. "Stu" Billett (November 19, 1935 – October 22, 2021) was an American television producer best known for being the creator and executive producer of The People's Court (alongside Ralph Edwards) from 1981 until his death in 2021, which won him four Daytime Emmy Awards.

== Early years ==
Billet served in the Marines and went to New York University, where he graduated with a degree in communication.

== Career ==
After attending college, Billett began his professional career in television, and started working on the East Coast before moving to the West Coast in 1970. He then pursued in the game show format during the 1960s and 70s.

=== Ralph Edwards; The People's Court and other projects ===
In 1981, Billett made a partnership with veteran producer Ralph Edwards to form Ralph Edwards-Stu Billett Productions.

The partnership lasted more than two decades, with Billett serving as Edwards' partner until Edwards' death in 2005.

Billett co-created The People's Court with Edwards, which originally aired from 1981 to 1993 and was widely regarded as the first arbitration-based reality court show, making way for numerous other arbitration court shows. The show was revived in 1997 with Billett reprising as executive producer for the revival (with ended in 2023).

He also produced other reality court and game shows including Superior Court, Moral Court and Bzzz!.

== Death ==
Billett died of natural causes on October 22, 2021, in Los Angeles, California, at the age of 85. He was survived by his wife, children and grandchildren.

The official Instagram account of The People's Court posted a tribute on October 26, expressing the loss of Billet.
