= The Cross-Wits =

American television game show

- Also known as: The All-New Crosswits
- Genre: Game show
- Created by: Jerry Payne
- Presented by: Jack Clark; David Sparks
- Announcer: John Harlan; Jay Stewart; Jerry Bishop; Michelle Roth
- Country of origin: United States
- Original language: English
- No. of episodes: 960 (1975–80); 195 (1986–87)

Production
- Running time: approx. 22–26 minutes
- Production companies: Ralph Edwards Productions (1975–80); Metromedia Producers Corporation (1975–80); Crossedwits Productions (1986–87); Outlet Communications, Inc. (1986–87)

Original release
- Network: Syndicated
- Release: December 15, 1975 – September 12, 1980

Related
- Crosswits (UK version)

The Cross-Wits is an American television game show. Two contestants, each paired with two celebrities, competed to fill in words in a crossword puzzle. It premiered on December 15, 1975, and lasted for five seasons until its cancellation on September 12, 1980. The show was hosted by Jack Clark, with Jerri Fiala as hostess. Announcing duties were handled by John Harlan, Jay Stewart, and Jerry Bishop. The show was produced by Ralph Edwards Productions and distributed by Metromedia Producers Corporation.

A second version began airing on September 8, 1986, titled The All-New Crosswits, and was hosted by David Sparks with Michelle Roth as announcer. This version was produced by Crossedwits Productions in association with Outlet Communications, Inc., and distributed by ABR Entertainment.

Both versions were produced as daily shows, although the original Cross-Wits aired in many markets as either a once- or twice-weekly series.

Game Show Network later produced People Puzzler, which aired from 2021–2023. The series is considered a loose remake of The Cross-Wits, with more emphasis on celebrities and pop culture.

== Main game ==
Two teams, each consisting of two celebrities and one contestant acting as team captain, competed to solve crossword puzzles by guessing the words in each puzzle. Each word in each puzzle was a clue to the puzzle's solution: a person, a place or a thing.

=== 1975–80 version ===
Logo for the 1975–80 version of The Cross-Wits.

Each puzzle's subject was announced at the beginning of each round. The contestant captain of one team chose a word in the puzzle and designated one of their celebrity partners to guess it. The clue for that word was read, and the celebrity had seven seconds to guess it; if he/she failed to do so, the contestant captain could guess the word, and if he/she could not do so, control of the puzzle passed over to the opposing team.

A correct answer awarded 10 points per letter in the word. The captain could then either choose a word for the other star on his/her team or solve the puzzle itself; in the latter case, he/she was allowed seven seconds to confer with their celebrity partners before solving the puzzle. A correct guess was worth 100 points, while an incorrect guess gave control to the opponents. The trailing team at the end of each round had initial control for the next round's puzzle.

Starting in 1976, contestants won a prize for solving each puzzle in addition to the 100-point bonus. From 1976 to 1979, the category of the master puzzle was not immediately revealed at the start of the first two rounds; any contestant who solved such a puzzle after the first word won a car. The host revealed the category if the puzzle was not solved at this point. In case a car was won in the first round, the category of the puzzle would be revealed for the second round. In 1979, the rules were changed to offer the car only during the second round, with no discussion between the celebrities and their contestant, who was given five seconds to decide on a response. The team that solved the puzzle in the first round began the second one, a change intended to deter teams from deliberately losing the first round in order to have a better chance at winning the car.

The game continued until time was called, and the captain of the leading team won the game. Starting in 1979, a captain whose team scored 1,000 points also won a $1,000 bonus.

This version was taped before the era of computerized graphics and featured a manually operated game board that used back-lit tiles which illuminated to show the letters in each word. Hostess Jerri Fiala would use a long teacher's pointer to indicate the position of each word on the board, as the numbers on the squares were too small to be seen by home viewers.

=== 1986–87 version ===
The game was played similarly to the 1975 version, but with different scoring. Each word in the first round puzzle was worth 5 points per letter and the puzzle solution itself was worth 50 points. These point values were doubled to 10/100 points in round two, and doubled again 20/200 points in round three. The game board for this version was a computer-generated board displayed on an offscreen television monitor, and each puzzle was a different color based on its subject: red for a person, blue for a place, and gold for a thing.

== Crossfire round (both versions) ==
The contestant with the most points at the end of the game played the Crossfire Round along with his/her choice of celebrity partner (a choice of all four in 1975-1976 & 1986-1987 and only the winning player's partners from 1976-1980). The team was shown a crossword puzzle with ten words, but unlike the main game puzzles, the Crossfire puzzle did not have a solution. The team called out one word at a time by their respective numbers/o and the host read the clue for that word. If the team guessed all ten words in 60 seconds or less, the contestant won the grand prize.

In the 1975 version, each correct answer won increasingly valuable prizes, and if the contestant guessed all ten words, he/she won the grand prize (usually a car or sometimes a fur coat or a vacation for two). In the 1986 version, contestants who won the Crossfire round won a vacation for two and the right to play for one of three new cars on stage. Contestants who failed to win the Crossfire round on the 1986 version won a consolation prize package.

=== Car round (1986–87 version) ===
The three remaining celebrities each had a box with a card listing the model name of one of the three cars on stage. The contestant chose a car, then a celebrity, and if the celebrity had the box with the selected car's name inside, the contestant won the car. For a time, all four celebrities participated in the car round, and a corresponding fourth box was added to the mix; it was worth $1,000 to the contestant if selected.

For the first two taped episodes, the three remaining celebrities each had a key to one of the three cars on stage. After the contestant chose a celebrity, the celebrity then attempted to unlock the chosen car's driver-side door with his/her key, and if it unlocked, the contestant won the car.

== Episode status ==
The original version is intact and held by Ralph Edwards Productions, but has not been rerun since its original airings. The revival was shown on The Family Channel from June 7 to August 27, 1993, and on the now defunct American Independent Network from 1997 to 1998. On October 26, 2014, cable network GSN aired two episodes of the revived version, both from December 1986 featuring Rosie O'Donnell and Arsenio Hall, respectively.

== International versions ==
The English channel ITV was the first international broadcaster to launch a local format of the game show, called Crosswits.

Country	Name	Presenter	Channel	Broadcast
United Kingdom	Crosswits	Barry Cryer (1985–1987); Tom O'Connor (1987–1998)	ITV	September 3, 1985 – December 23, 1998
