= Knockout (game show) =

American game show

- Genre: Game show
- Created by: Mark Maxwell-Smith
- Directed by: Arthur Forrest
- Presented by: Arte Johnson
- Announcer: Jay Stewart; John Harlan
- Theme music composer: Hal Hidey; Bruce Belland
- Composer: Hal Hidey
- Country of origin: United States
- Original language: English
- No. of seasons: 1
- No. of episodes: 143

Production
- Executive producer: Ralph Edwards
- Producers: Bruce Belland; Mark Maxwell-Smith
- Running time: 25 minutes
- Production company: Ralph Edwards Productions

Original release
- Network: NBC
- Release: October 3, 1977 – April 21, 1978

Related
- Odd One Out (UK version)

Knockout is an NBC game show that aired from October 3, 1977 to April 21, 1978. A Ralph Edwards production, it was hosted by Arte Johnson, with announcing duties handled first by Jay Stewart and later by John Harlan.

== Gameplay ==
Three players were shown a list of four items, revealed one at a time, and had to buzz-in and identify the one that was unrelated to the others. They were not required to wait until all four items had been revealed before buzzing-in. A correct answer earned one letter in the word KNOCKOUT, displayed on his/her podium, and gave him/her a chance to earn additional letters. The player could either try to name the category of the related items for one letter, or dare one opponent to name it for two letters. If the dared opponent failed, the answering player received the two letters and could then either name the category or dare the other opponent to do so; a second miss gave the player one more chance to name it.

A new list was played whenever any of the following occurred:

- No player correctly chose the unrelated item
- A player chose the unrelated item and guessed the category, right or wrong (either immediately or after a dare)
- A dared opponent guessed the category correctly

A player could earn up to six letters in one turn by choosing the unrelated item, successfully daring both opponents, and then guessing the category. Doing so (referred to by Johnson as a "six-letter play") awarded a $300 bonus to the player.

The first player to spell KNOCKOUT won a bonus prize, took/retained the championship, and advanced to the bonus round. Players stayed on the show until they lost two games or won five.

=== Bonus round ===
The bonus round was played in two halves. In the first half, the champion was shown a list of three items, one at a time, and tried to guess the category to which they belonged after each was revealed. The champion won $500 for a correct guess after the first item, $300 after the second, or $100 after the third. If the champion missed after the third item, the round ended immediately and he/she won nothing.

For the second part, the champion selected one of three clues and was given five seconds to think about the category to which all three belonged. A correct guess multiplied the first-half winnings by 10, for a maximum of $5,000.

Any champion who played five bonus rounds received a new car and retired undefeated.

== Broadcast history ==
Succeeding Monty Hall's short-lived It's Anybody's Guess, Knockout marked Ralph Edwards' third attempt at a daytime game on NBC in as many years. After failing with two different short-lived versions of Name That Tune on NBC daytime, which had become a major hit off network, he banked on the appeal of former Laugh-In star Johnson who had, in the intervening years since that show's cancellation, become a regular panelist on games like Hollywood Squares and Gong Show.

Johnson's popularity, however, was no match for ABC's Family Feud, which was on its way to becoming daytime's most popular game at 11:30 a.m./10:30 Central. Knockout got only a six-month run before NBC replaced it with a revamped High Rollers. As for Edwards, he would never again attempt a daytime network show, preferring to stick to syndication for Tune and later shows like The People's Court.

== Episode status ==
The show is believed to be wiped as per network practices of the era. One episode is held at the Paley Center for Media from March 15, 1978; a second is held at the UCLA Film and Television Archive, listed as Episode #75 (taped January 11, 1978), and a third episode exists and has been posted on online platforms like YouTube.
