= Truth or Consequences =

American radio and television game show

- Title card for the 1987–1988 version
- Created by: Ralph Edwards
- Presented by: Ralph Edwards; Jack Bailey; Bob Barker; Steve Dunne; Bob Hilton; Larry Anderson
- Country of origin: United States
- No. of episodes: 39 (CBS Primetime; 1950–1951); 124 (NBC Primetime; 1954–1956); 2,254 (NBC Daytime; 1956–1965); 26 (NBC Primetime; 1957–1958); 1,755 (Syndication; 1966–1975); 32 (Syndication; 1977–1978); 195 (Syndication; 1987–1988)

Production
- Running time: 30 minutes (per episode)

Original release
- Network: CBS (1950–1954); NBC (1954–1965); Syndicated (1966–1975, 1977–1978, 1987–1988)
- Release: March 23, 1940 – February 26, 1988

Truth or Consequences is an American game show originally hosted on NBC radio by Ralph Edwards (1940–57) and later on television by Edwards (1950–54), Jack Bailey (1954–56), Bob Barker (1956–75), Steve Dunne (1957–58), Bob Hilton (1977–78) and Larry Anderson (1987–88). The television show ran on CBS, NBC and also in syndication. The premise of the show was to mix the original quiz element of game shows with wacky stunts.

The daily syndicated show was produced by Ralph Edwards Productions (later Ralph Edwards/Stu Billett Productions), in association with and distributed by Metromedia Producers Corporation (1966–78) and Lorimar-Telepictures (1987–88). Current rights are owned by Ralph Edwards Productions.

== Game play ==
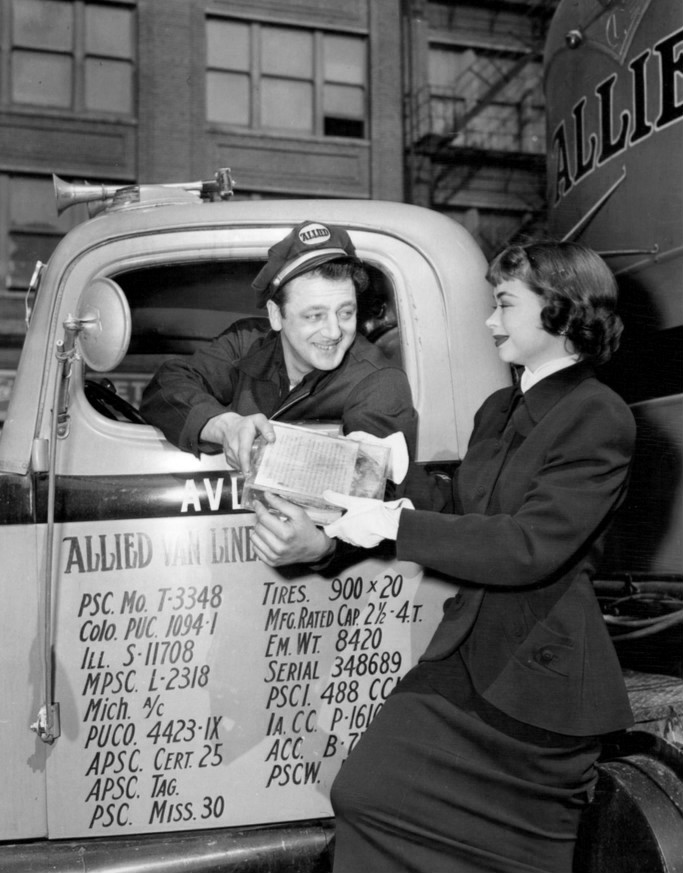
Ralph Edwards with actress Buff Cobb as a part of a 1949 stunt on the show.

On the show, contestants received roughly two seconds to answer a trivia question correctly (usually an off-the-wall question that no one would be able to answer correctly, or a bad joke) before "Beulah the Buzzer" sounded. On the rare occasions that a contestant did answer correctly, the host would reveal that the question had multiple parts. Failing to complete this "truth" portion meant that the contestant had to face "consequences", typically by performing a zany and embarrassing stunt. Contestants' involvement in these stunts and the audience's reaction led Edwards to state about himself and his producers, "Aren't we devils?" From the start, most contestants preferred to answer the question wrong to perform the stunt. Edwards said, "Most of the American people are darned good sports."

A popular segment on many episodes was an emotional surprise for a contestant, such as being reunited with a long-lost relative or with an enlisted son or daughter returning from military duty overseas, particularly Vietnam. Sometimes, if a military member was based in California, his spouse or parents were flown in for a reunion.

During Barker's run as host, a side game, "Barker's Box", was played at the end of the show. Barker's Box had four drawers; three contained money, while a pop-up "surprise" was in the fourth. The contestant chose one drawer at a time and won the money in each. The game ended if the contestant found the surprise, while avoiding it awarded a bonus prize.

Barker traditionally ended each episode with the phrase, "Hoping all your consequences are happy ones." In one 1994 episode of The Price Is Right, he started to deliver that closing, but caught his mistake and covered it by saying "hoping all your...prices are right!", instead of the familiar "Have your pets spayed or neutered" line he was best known for using at the time.

== Broadcast history ==
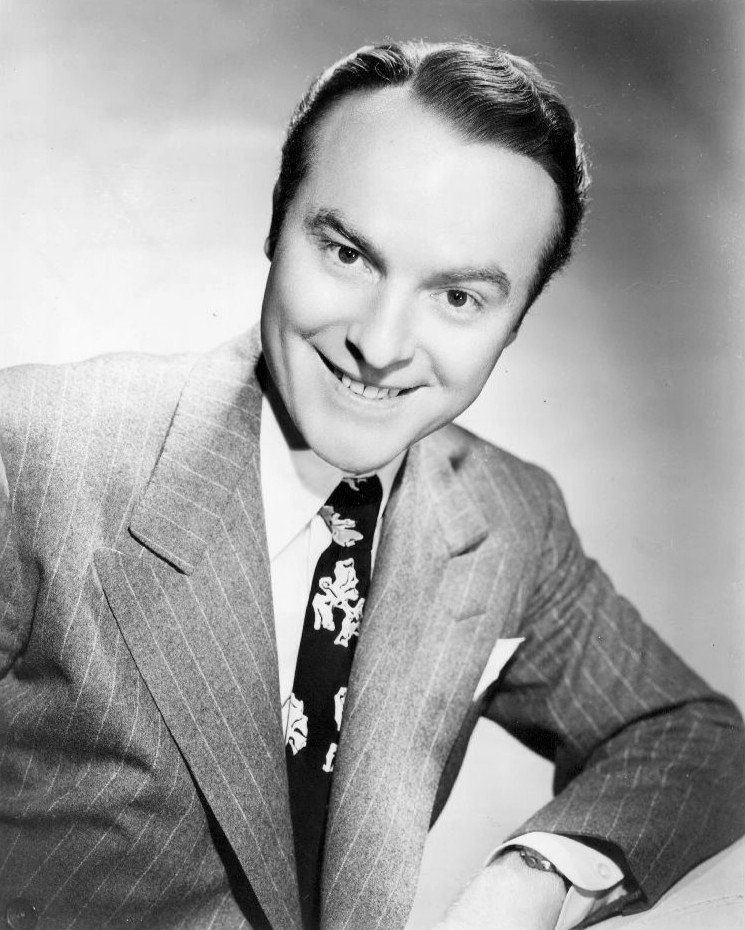
Ralph Edwards in a promotional image for Truth or Consequences, 1948.

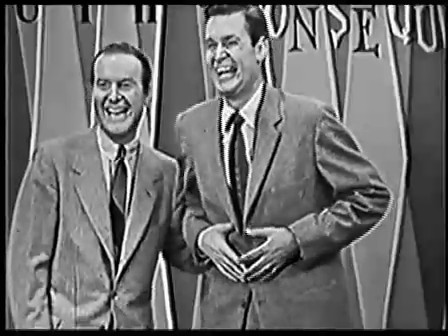
Bob Barker's TV hosting debut on Truth or Consequences, 1956.

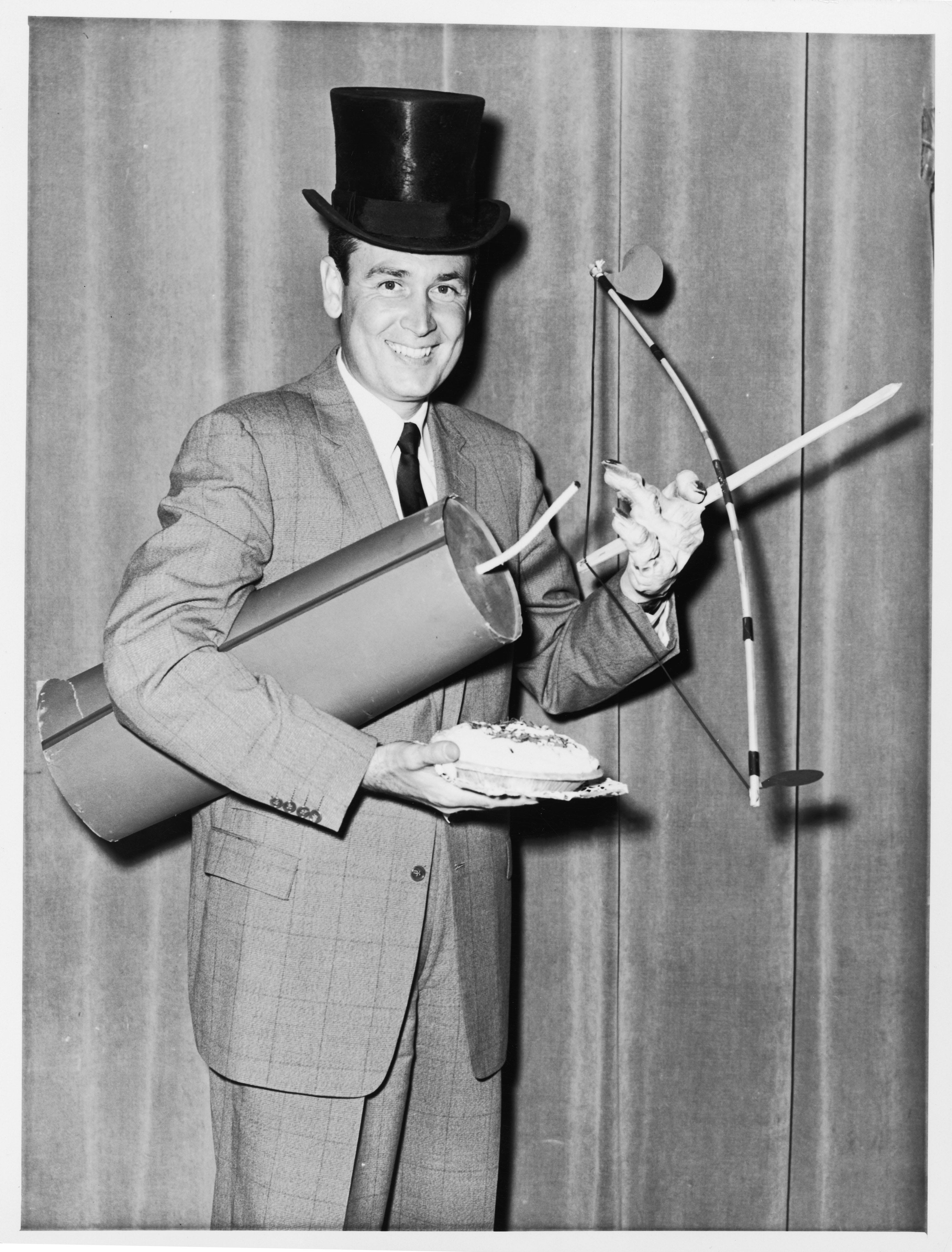
Barker on Truth or Consequences, circa 1958.

Ralph Edwards stated he got the idea for a new radio program from a favorite childhood parlor game, "Forfeits". The show premiered on NBC Radio on March 23, 1940. The show was first originated in New York, before moving 5 years later to Los Angeles on March 17, 1945, as Ralph Edwards became the first game show creator to move to Los Angeles.

Truth or Consequences was the first game show to air on broadcast television, airing as a one-time experiment on the first day of New York station WNBT's commercial program schedule on July 1, 1941. However, the series did not appear on TV again until 1950, when the medium had caught on commercially. On September 6, 1950, WCBS-TV in New York City began local broadcasts of kinescopes of episodes that had been broadcast on KTTV in Los Angeles. Phillip Morris sponsored the series in New York.

The program originated as a prime time series, airing on CBS from September 7, 1950, to May 31, 1951, hosted by Edwards. Three years later, it returned on NBC with Jack Bailey (of Queen for a Day) as host, this time running from May 18, 1954, to September 28, 1956. NBC launched a new daytime version on December 31 of that year, with radio personality Bob Barker at the helm. This run not only marked the start of a hugely successful television career for Barker, but also became the longest-running incarnation of Truth or Consequences yet, airing until September 24, 1965. During Barker's run, another prime time version was attempted, this one with actor Steve Dunne emceeing, which ran on NBC from December 13, 1957, to June 6, 1958.

Edwards pioneered several technologies for recording live television programs. When Truth or Consequences established a permanent presence on TV in 1950, Edwards arranged to have it be recorded on 35mm film, using multiple cameras simultaneously—the first TV program recorded before a live audience to do so. A similar process was then adapted by Desilu for I Love Lucy the following year. On January 22, 1957, the show, which was produced in Hollywood, became the first program to be broadcast in all time zones from a prerecorded videotape. This technology had previously been used only for time-delayed broadcasts to the West Coast.

The show went color on October 27, 1958, and it was initially cancelled in 1959, with its last broadcast being September 25, 1959 and was replaced by House on High Street, only to reverse course on October 24, 1959 after the game show scandals forced the cancellation of Tic Tac Dough, and returned it to being in black and white. The return debuted on October 26, 1959. The show permanently returned to color on September 30, 1963. The show made its last broadcast on NBC on September 24, 1965 along with three other shows What's This Song?, Call My Bluff and I'll Bet, being replaced on the timeslot by the short-lived Fractured Phrases.

In 1966, Truth or Consequences became the first successful daily game show in first-run syndication (as opposed to reruns) to not air on a network, having ended its NBC run one year earlier. This version continued through 1975.

In the fall of 1977, a syndicated revival titled The New Truth or Consequences premiered. Because Bob Barker had already agreed to take over The Nighttime Price Is Right from Dennis James, he was unavailable and Bob Hilton took over hosting. However, this version did not click in the ratings and was cancelled after a single season.

A decade later, Truth or Consequences returned in syndication for the 1987–1988 season, this time with actor Larry Anderson as host, assisted by Murray Langston (better known as "The Unknown Comic" on The Gong Show). This effort also failed to attract audiences and was gone after one season.

== Episode status ==
According to the Inter-Office Memorandum published by Pat Gleason on June 25, 1987, the status of believed existing episodes breaks down as follows:

- 37½ episodes of the 1950–1951 CBS primetime version
- 95 episodes of the 1954–1956 NBC primetime version
- 74 episodes of the 1956–1965 NBC daytime version
- no episodes of the 1957–1958 NBC primetime version
- at least 1,700 episodes of the 1966–1975 syndicated version
- all episodes of the 1977–1978 syndicated version

The show has been rarely broadcast outside of its initial presentations.

A previously unseen, unsold pilot pitched to Fox, produced around 2003 or 2004, was uploaded by the team that ran veteran game show host Wink Martindale's YouTube page. The pilot was hosted by sports journalist Chris Rose. In 2023, the Wink Martindale YouTube channel uploaded the pilot of the 1977–1978 version.

== "Jimmy" episode ==
On May 22, 1948, Truth or Consequences broadcast live from the newly founded Dana–Farber Cancer Institute, and surprised 12-year-old cancer patient Einar Gustafson by having members of the Boston Braves visit the boy in his room. Gustafson was referred to only as "Jimmy" to protect his identity. (Not only did Gustafson's cancer go into remission, but the Braves won the National League pennant, their last before moving to Milwaukee in 1953.) The broadcast launched The Jimmy Fund and its long-standing relationship with the Boston Red Sox as their official charity beginning in 1953. (After many years in seclusion—leading to speculation that "Jimmy" had died—Gustafson re-emerged in the 1990s and was made honorary chairman of the Jimmy Fund in 1998. He died in 2001, aged 65.)
