= Ralph Edwards =

American radio & TV host and producer (1913–2005)

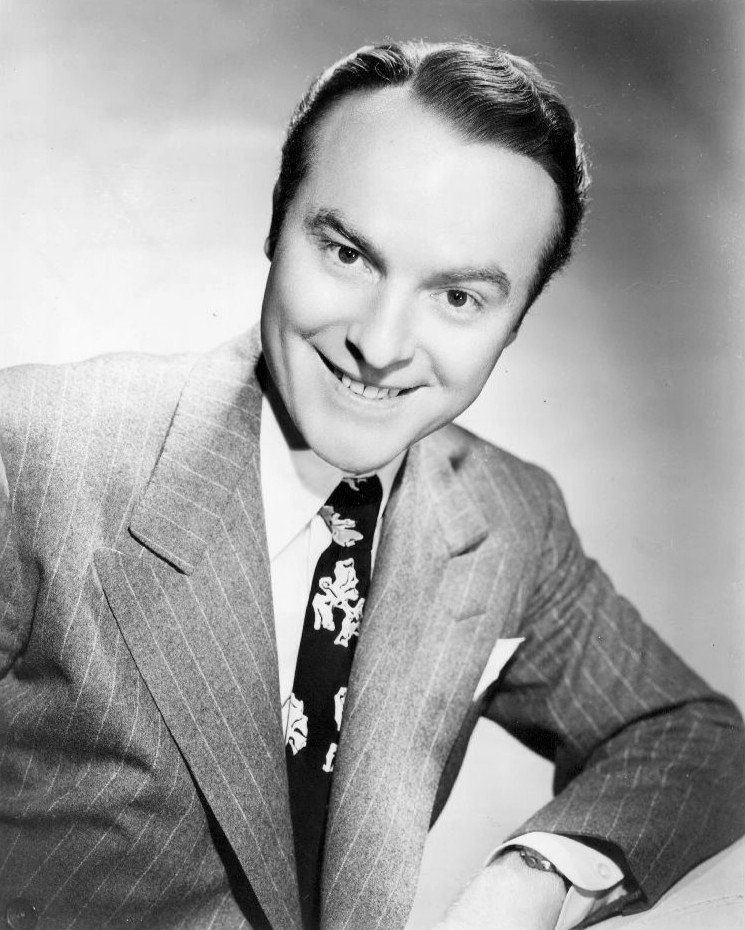
- Edwards in 1948
- Born: Ralph Livingstone Edwards; June 13, 1913; Merino, Colorado, U.S.
- Died: November 16, 2005 (aged 92); Los Angeles, California, U.S.
- Occupations: Radio host; television host; radio producer; television producer
- Spouse: Barbara Jean Sheldon (m. 1939; died 1993)
- Children: 3
- Website: www.ralphedwards.com

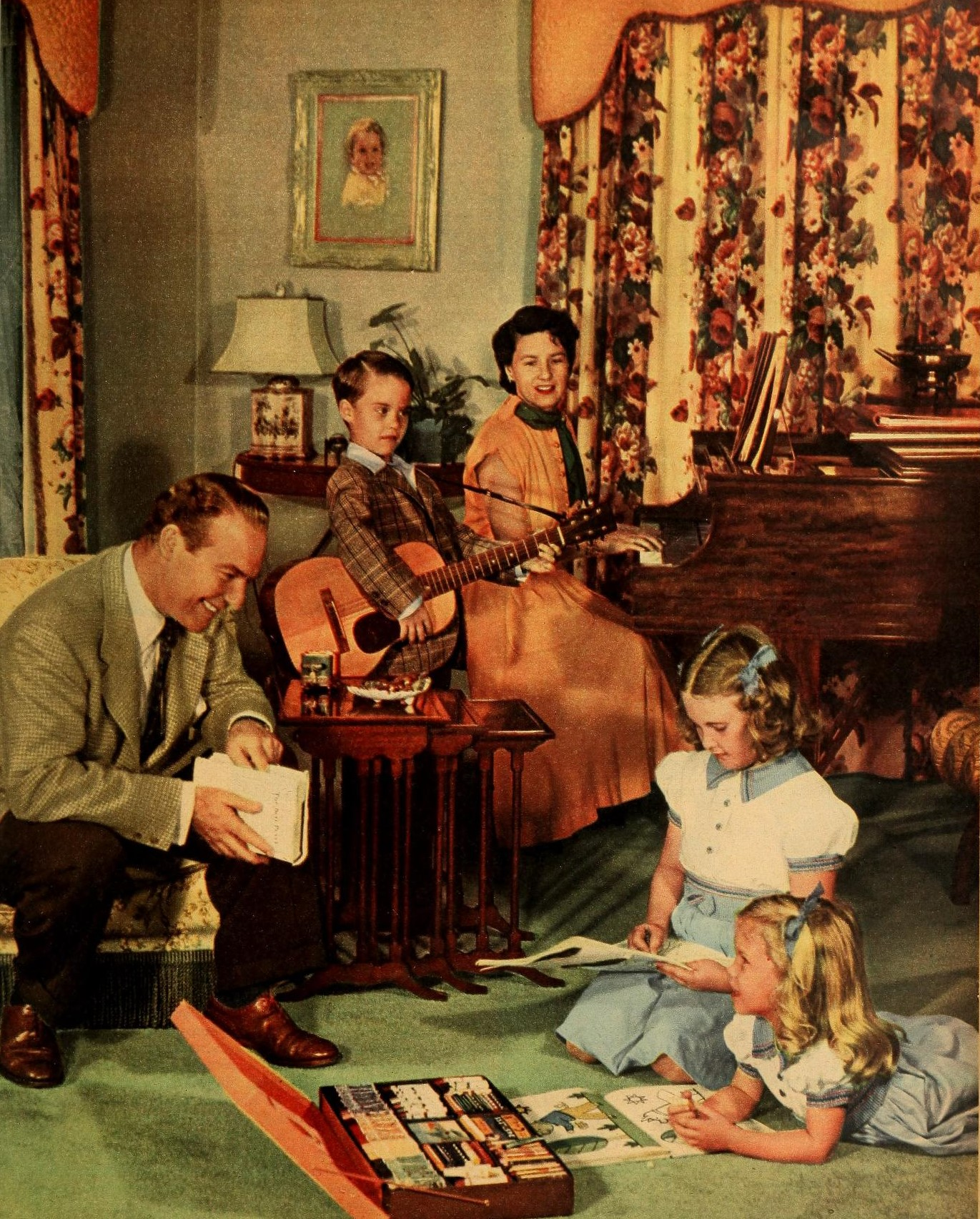
Edwards and family, 1952

Ralph Livingstone Edwards (June 13, 1913 – November 16, 2005) was an American radio and television host, radio producer, and television producer, best known for his radio-TV game shows Truth or Consequences and reality documentary series This Is Your Life.

== Early career ==
Edwards worked for KROW Radio in Oakland, California, while he was still in high school. After graduating from high school in 1931, he worked his way through college at the University of California, Berkeley, earning a bachelor of arts in English in 1935. While there, he worked at every job from janitor to producer at Oakland's KTAB, now KZAC. Failing to get a job as a high-school teacher, he worked at KFRC and then hitchhiked across the country to New York City, where, he said, "I ate ten-cent meals and slept on park benches".

After some part-time announcing jobs, he got his big break in 1938 with a full-time job for the Columbia Broadcasting System on the original WABC (now WHSQ), where he worked with two other young announcers who became broadcasting fixtures: Mel Allen and Andre Baruch.

Early in his career, Edwards worked as a radio announcer and became nationally recognized within a few years. He introduced Major Bowes every week on the Original Amateur Hour and Fred Allen on Town Hall Tonight. He later developed a distinctive conversational delivery style, leading him to be hired by 20th Century Fox to narrate the coming-attractions trailers for Laurel and Hardy movies.

Edwards was the second host of the NBC radio children's talent show The Horn and Hardart Children's Hour. He appeared in a few films, including Radio Stars On Parade, with the comedy team of Wally Brown and Alan Carney, and I'll Cry Tomorrow with Susan Hayward.

== Truth or Consequences ==
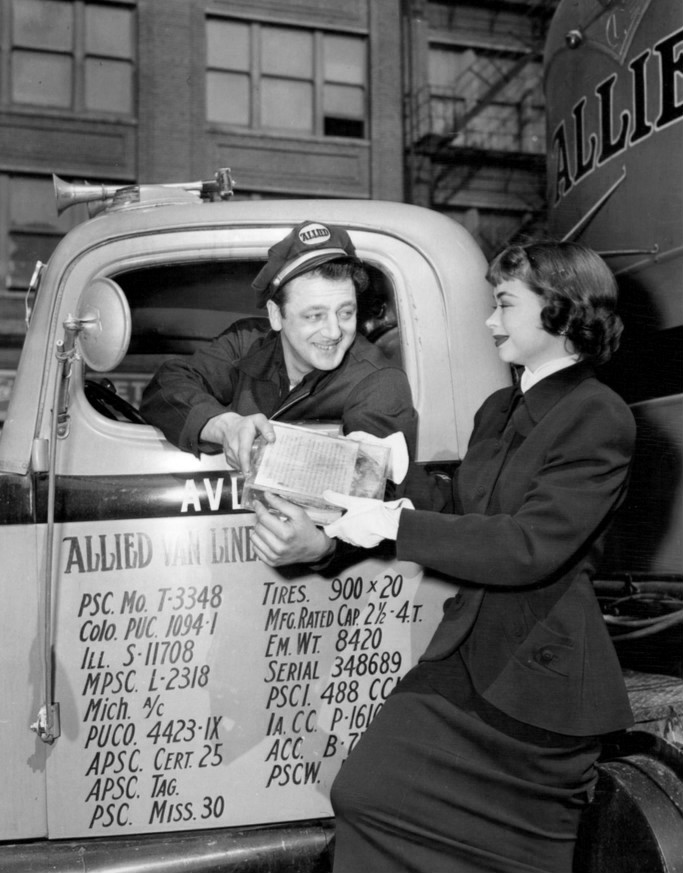
Edwards with Buff Cobb on a 1949 stunt of Truth or Consequences

After years of experimental broadcasts, the Federal Communications Commission approved commercial television broadcasts starting on July 1, 1941, and NBC's New York station WNBT (now WNBC) was the first to make the changeover, with Edwards hosting a one-time episode of Truth or Consequences over WNBT to commemorate the first day of commercial telecasting.

The show was originally based in New York City, with Mel Allen as announcer, but later moved to Los Angeles. After the U.S. entered World War II in late 1941, causing early television broadcasts to be cut back dramatically, its radio run started on CBS (home network to both Edwards and Allen), then moved to NBC.

Edwards and the Truth or Consequences radio show were featured in a Superman story in Action Comics #127 (December 1948).

== This Is Your Life ==
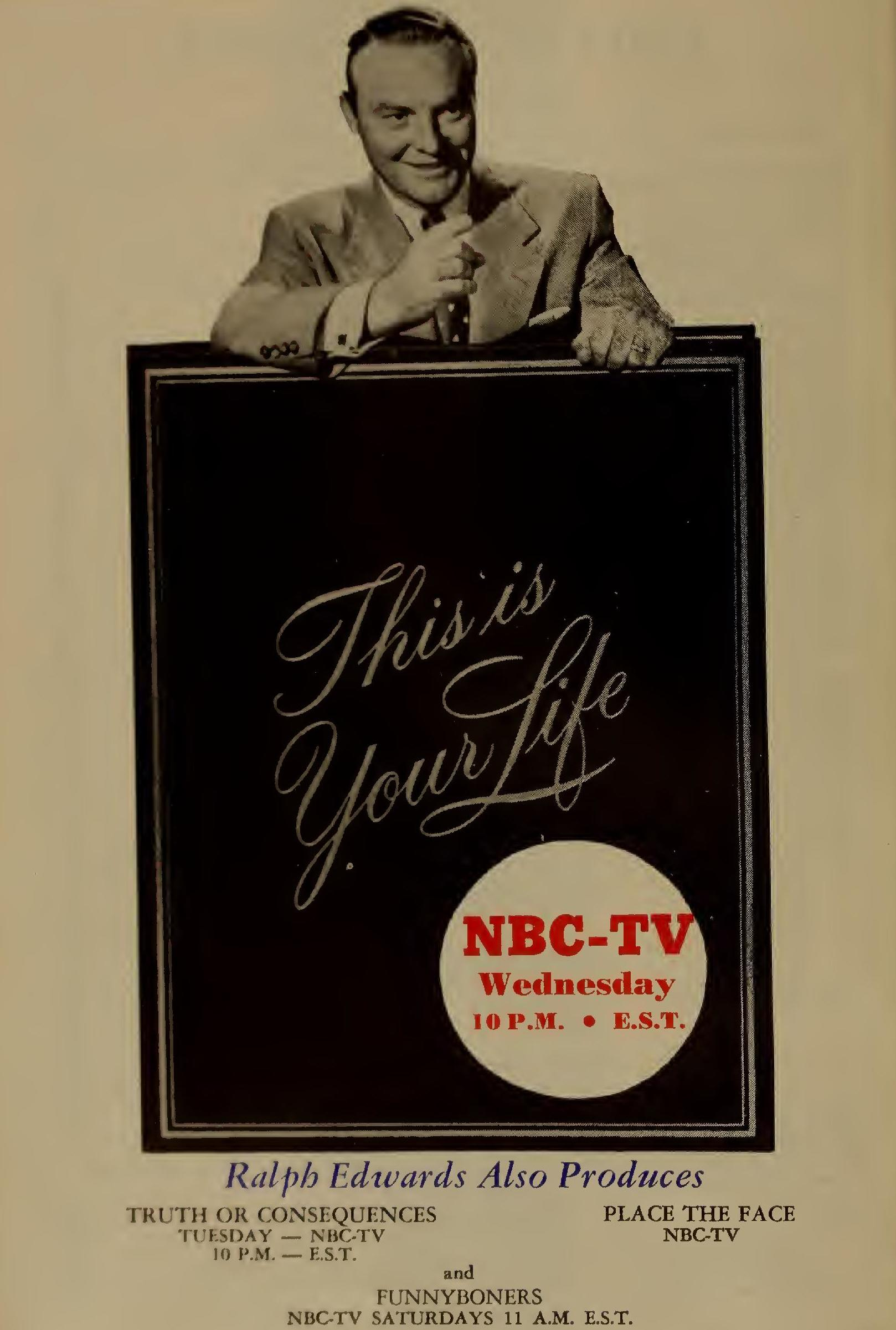
This is Your Life NBC-TV ad in the Radio Annual and Television Yearbook, 1955

In 1948 Edwards created, produced, and hosted This Is Your Life on NBC Radio, moving to NBC-TV in 1952–1961. Each week, Edwards would surprise some unsuspecting person (usually a celebrity, sometimes an ordinary citizen) and review the subject's personal and professional life in front of the TV audience, often introducing figures from their past as live guests. The show drew great interest from viewers, partly because the identity of the subject was not revealed until the show went live. Throughout the half-hour, Edwards would guide the narrative of the show, ushering visitors on and off stage, and eventually prompting the honoree to recall a personal turning point. Edwards was showman enough to draw upon his Truth or Consequences experience, emphasizing the sentimental elements that appealed to viewers and listeners at home. His on-air tributes would often recount some heroic sacrifice or tragic event, bringing the audience (and sometimes the subject) to the point of tears. Celebrity subjects included Marilyn Monroe, Stan Laurel and Oliver Hardy, Bob Hope, Andy Griffith, Buster Keaton, Barbara Eden, Bette Davis, Shirley Jones, Jayne Mansfield, Johnny Cash, and Carol Channing. In a comic-book story published in the DC Comics "Superman's Girl Friend, Lois Lane" (#9, May 1959), Ralph Edwards surprised Lois when she was the subject of This Is Your Life. He also appeared in a McGruff the Crime Dog public service announcement where McGruff himself was the subject, featuring clips from past ones.

== Other works ==
Edwards produced dozens of game shows, including About Faces, Knockout, Place the Face, It Could Be You, Name That Tune (1970s version), and The Cross-Wits. In 1981, with Stu Billett, he executive-produced The People's Court, the first program of its type. In 1996, along with Stu Billett, they also did Bzzz!. During the 1980s, he partnered with Stu Billett to run Ralph Edwards/Stu Billett Productions, of which in 1986, they wanted to expand it beyond game and court shows and hired Lorimar-Telepictures veteran Jay Feldman to serve as senior vice president, in order to go for specials and made-for-television features. He had a notable acting role, his character a jovial and decreasingly skeptical radio DJ, in the episode of the CBS Radio series Suspense "Ghost Hunt" (based on H. Russell Wakefield's story from the 25th anniversary issue of Weird Tales) in 1949.

== Bob Barker ==
Edwards furthered the career of another game show host, his protégé Bob Barker. The 1940s-1950s TV version of Truth or Consequences had featured Edwards, Jack Bailey, and Steve Dunne. When the show returned for another NBC run in late 1956, Edwards hired Barker, a popular West Coast radio personality, on December 21 after hearing his radio show on his car radio. During the 2001 Daytime Emmy Awards, Barker told backstage reporters that his lifelong friend Edwards told him to be no one else but himself.

Barker would host Truth or Consequences on NBC until 1965, and later in daily syndication until 1975, by which time he had also taken over a revival of The Price Is Right on CBS from 1972 to 2007 (Drew Carey has been the host since 2007). As a result, thanks to Edwards's "be yourself" admonition, Barker became as familiar with a generation of Truth or Consequences and Price Is Right viewers, as earlier fans had with Edwards and original Price Is Right host Bill Cullen during the original versions of the shows in the 1950s and 1960s.

== Death ==
Edwards died of heart failure on November 16, 2005, in Los Angeles, California at the age of 92. Shortly before his death he released a selection of his This Is Your Life programs on DVD.

== Recognition ==
The Game Show Congress annually presents the Ralph Edwards Service Award, for those within the game show community who have worked for charitable causes. In 2004, Edwards was the first recipient of the award.

For his contribution to the radio and television industries, Ralph Edwards has two stars on the Hollywood Walk of Fame located at 6116 Hollywood Boulevard (radio) and 6262 Hollywood Boulevard (television). Both were dedicated February 8, 1960.

Edwards was inducted into the National Radio Hall of Fame in 1995.

== Filmography ==
Year	Title	Role	Notes
1937	Manhattan Merry-Go-Round	Radio Man	Uncredited
1942	Seven Days' Leave	Himself	
1945	Radio Stars on Parade	Himself	
1946	The Bamboo Blonde	Eddie Clark	
1947	Beat the Band	Eddie Martin	
1955	I'll Cry Tomorrow	Himself	Uncredited

Preceded by Originator	Truth or Consequences Host (radio); 1940–1957	Succeeded by None
Preceded by Originator	Truth or Consequences Host (television); 1950–1954	Succeeded by Jack Bailey
